= 2018–19 Basketbol Süper Ligi =

Basketball league in Turkey

Basketbol Süper Ligi
- Season: 2018–19
- Dates: 6 October 2018 – 21 June 2019
- Teams: 15

Regular season
- Season MVP: (Egypt) Assem Marei
- Relegated: Adatıp Sakarya BB

Finals
- Champions: Anadolu Efes (14th title)
- Runners-up: Fenerbahçe
- Semi-finalists: Galatasaray Doğa Sigorta; Tofaş
- Finals MVP: (United States) Shane Larkin

Statistical leaders
Points	(United States) Kenny Hayes	21.7
Rebounds	(United States) Devin Williams	11.8
Assists	(Serbia) Vasilije Micić	6.7
Index Rating	(Egypt) Assem Marei	22.7

The 2018–19 Basketbol Süper Ligi was the 53rd season of the Basketbol Süper Ligi, the top-tier level professional club basketball league in Turkey. The season started on 6 October 2018 and ended 21 June 2019.

Anadolu Efes captured its fourteenth title and its first championship in 10 years, after it defeated Fenerbahçe in seven in the finals.

== Teams ==
=== Promotion and relegation ===
Yeşilgiresun Belediye and Uşak Sportif were relegated after finishing in the last two places during the previous season. Türk Telekom promoted as the champions of the Turkish Basketball First League (TBL). Afyon Belediye promoted as the winners of the play-offs.

On 12 July 2018, Eskişehir Basket announced its withdrawal from the BSL. On 13 July 2018, it was announced that Bahçeşehir Koleji received the vacant BSL spot.

On 2 October 2018, Trabzonspor announced its withdrawal from the BSL.

=== Locations and stadia ===
Locations of the 2018–19 Basketbol Süper Ligi clubs
Istanbul Basketbol Süper Ligi clubs

Team	Home city	Stadium	Capacity
Afyon Belediye	Afyonkarahisar	Afyon Atatürk Sports Hall	2,000
Anadolu Efes	Istanbul	Sinan Erdem Dome	16,000
Bahçeşehir Koleji	Istanbul	Caferağa Sports Hall	1,500
Banvit	Bandırma	Kara Ali Acar Sport Hall	3,000
Beşiktaş Sompo Japan	Istanbul	BJK Akatlar Arena	3,200
Darüşşafaka Tekfen	Istanbul	Volkswagen Arena Istanbul	5,000
Arel Üniversitesi Büyükçekmece	Istanbul	Gazanfer Bilge Spor Salonu	3,000
Fenerbahçe Beko	Istanbul	Ülker Sports Arena	13,800
Galatasaray Doğa Sigorta	Istanbul	Sinan Erdem Dome	16,000
Gaziantep Basketbol	Gaziantep	Karataş Şahinbey Sport Hall	6,400
İstanbul BB	Istanbul	Cebeci Sport Hall	1,250
Pınar Karşıyaka	İzmir	Karşıyaka Arena	5,000
Adatıp Sakarya BB	Sakarya	Sakarya Sports Hall	5,000
Tofaş	Bursa	Tofaş Nilüfer Sports Hall	7,500
Türk Telekom	Ankara	Ankara Arena	10,400

=== Personnel and sponsorship ===
Team	Head coach	Captain	Kit manufacturer	Main shirt sponsor
Afyon Belediye	(Turkey) Can Sevim	(Turkey) Altan Erol	Dafron	Afjet
Anadolu Efes	(Turkey) Ergin Ataman	(Turkey) Doğuş Balbay	S by Sportive	Efes
Bahçeşehir Koleji	(Greece) Stefanos Dedas	(Turkey) Yiğitcan Turna	Playoff	Bahçeşehir College
Banvit	(Turkey) Hakan Demir	(Turkey) Tolga Geçim & (Turkey) Rıdvan Öncel	Dafron	Banvit
Beşiktaş Sompo Japan	(Montenegro) Duško Ivanović	(Turkey) Muratcan Güler	Adidas	Sompo Japan Sigorta
Darüşşafaka Tekfen	(Turkey) Selçuk Ernak	(Turkey) Oğuz Savaş	Under Armour	Garanti Bank
Arel Üniversitesi Büyükçekmece	(Turkey) Serhat Şehit	(United States) Kenny Hayes	Dafron	Istanbul Arel University
Fenerbahçe Beko	(Serbia) Željko Obradović	(Turkey) Melih Mahmutoğlu	Nike	Beko
Galatasaray Doğa Sigorta	(Turkey) Ertuğrul Erdoğan	(Turkey) Göksenin Köksal	Givova	N/A
Gaziantep Basketbol	(Bosnia and Herzegovina) Nenad Marković	(Turkey) Can Uğur Öğüt	Dafron	N/A
İstanbul BB	(Turkey) Hakan Yavuz	(Turkey) Mehmet Yağmur	Adidas	Intercity
Pınar Karşıyaka	(Germany) Dirk Bauermann	(Turkey) Erdi Gülaslan	S by Sportive	Pınar
Adatıp Sakarya BB	(Turkey) Ozan Bulkaz	-	Tryon	Adatıp Hastanesi
Tofaş	(Turkey) Orhun Ene	(Dominican Republic) Sammy Mejía	Dafron	Fiat
Türk Telekom	(Turkey) Burak Gören	(Turkey) Kaya Peker	Fertino	Türk Telekom

== Regular season ==
=== League table ===
Pos	Team	Pld	W	L	PF	PA	PD	Pts	Qualification or relegation
1	Anadolu Efes	28	25	3	2509	2119	+390	53	Advance to playoffs
2	Fenerbahçe Beko	28	24	4	2437	1969	+468	52	Advance to playoffs
3	Tofaş	28	18	10	2286	2211	+75	46	Advance to playoffs
4	Galatasaray Doğa Sigorta	28	18	10	2271	2141	+130	46	Advance to playoffs
5	Gaziantep Basketbol	28	17	11	2069	1983	+86	45	Advance to playoffs
6	Beşiktaş Sompo Japan	28	16	12	2193	2134	+59	44	Advance to playoffs
7	Türk Telekom	28	16	12	2224	2204	+20	44	Advance to playoffs
8	Banvit	28	14	14	2241	2207	+34	42	Advance to playoffs
9	Bahçeşehir Koleji	28	13	15	2308	2279	+29	41	
10	Darüşşafaka Tekfen	28	13	15	2268	2140	+128	41	
11	Pınar Karşıyaka	28	11	17	2223	2285	−62	39	
12	Arel Üniversitesi Büyükçekmece	28	8	20	2195	2475	−280	36	
13	İstanbul BB	28	6	22	2168	2458	−290	34	
14	Afyon Belediye	28	6	22	2203	2371	−168	34	
15	Adatıp Sakarya BB (R)	28	5	23	1863	2482	−619	33	Relegation to TBL

Source: Basketbol Süper Ligi
(R) Relegated

=== Results ===
Home \ Away	AFY	EFS	BAH	BAN	BJK	DSK	DIB	FEN	GAL	GAZ	IBB	KSK	SAK	TOF	TTA
Afyon Belediye	—	74–105	70–80	90–96	79–82	93–96	76–80	72–96	69–77	71–73	74–76	89–86	91–70	96–85	77–79
Anadolu Efes	97–78	—	86–73	93–85	86–90	75–72	98–81	67–65	92–82	88–81	111–74	104–76	86–96	98–54	87–59
Bahçeşehir Koleji	88–79	81–87	—	86–78	83–57	92–85	92–78	77–84	83–78	86–92	103–86	74–62	87–83	79–77	78–84
Banvit	72–71	62–86	93–84	—	76–67	65–82	59–81	83–78	75–80	74–82	95–63	84–75	94–52	90–89	83–96
Beşiktaş Sompo Japan	80–75	92–95	80–78	95–75	—	81–72	90–84	58–79	72–74	63–69	87–83	61–57	77–65	78–73	85–67
Darüşşafaka Tekfen	85–67	86–95	77–72	82–89	73–74	—	100–51	72–87	79–84	62–63	93–65	93–78	82–57	78–82	94–87
Arel Üniversitesi Büyükçekmece	84–94	72–90	103–106	71–100	69–79	76–69	—	69–98	65–86	69–93	96–90	91–79	92–82	72–102	80–77
Fenerbahçe Beko	92–68	86–79	90–73	70–77	78–73	91–61	107–70	—	90–67	84–67	93–70	80–72	89–64	89–56	87–64
Galatasaray Doğa Sigorta	98–103	70–73	88–73	86–76	93–87	64–80	93–85	84–74	—	70–66	93–74	81–71	102–65	76–75	74–56
Gaziantep Basketbol	89–63	65–66	65–63	73–69	63–56	62–65	76–60	55–67	71–67	—	80–69	74–73	83–58	66–79	85–79
İstanbul BB	75–70	80–93	50–98	74–71	74–82	87–81	78–97	86–103	69–77	65–94	—	84–89	117–72	82–87	82–89
Pınar Karşıyaka	86–70	66–96	103–77	80–74	89–87	100–84	86–81	81–88	78–75	82–81	86–93	—	93–63	55–82	86–89
Sakarya BB	57–93	62–99	84–71	67–75	62–115	43–106	73–69	62–138	56–89	75–67	82–77	64–87	—	69–73	55–65
Tofaş	95–74	81–93	87–85	88–83	89–79	80–72	97–83	69–74	97–82	77–67	73–61	93–91	89–72	—	85–82
Türk Telekom	92–77	76–84	93–86	66–87	74–66	80–87	105–86	72–80	87–81	83–67	89–84	73–56	76–53	85–72	—

Legend: Blue = home team win; Red = away team win.

== Playoffs ==
Quarterfinals
1	Anadolu Efes	2
8	Banvit	0
4	Galatasaray Doğa Sigorta	2
5	Gaziantep Basketbol	1
2	Fenerbahçe Beko	2
7	Türk Telekom	1
3	Tofaş	2
6	Beşiktaş Sompo Japan	0

Semifinals
1	Anadolu Efes	3
4	Galatasaray Doğa Sigorta	0
2	Fenerbahçe Beko	3
3	Tofaş	0

Finals
1	Anadolu Efes	4
2	Fenerbahçe Beko	3

== Awards and statistics ==
=== Statistical leaders ===
Category	Player	Club	Average
Efficiency	(Egypt) Assem Marei	Pınar Karşıyaka	22.7
Points	(United States) Kenny Hayes	Arel Üniversitesi Büyükçekmece	21.7
Rebounds	(United States) Devin Williams	Arel Üniversitesi Büyükçekmece	11.8
Assists	(Serbia) Vasilije Micić	Anadolu Efes	6.7
Blocks	(United States) Jeremy Evans	Darüşşafaka Tekfen	1.3
Steal	(Dominican Republic) Sammy Mejia	Tofaş	1.7

== Turkish clubs in European competitions ==
Team	Competition	Progress
Anadolu Efes	EuroLeague	Runners-up
Fenerbahçe Beko	EuroLeague	Final-Four
Darüşşafaka Tekfen	EuroLeague	Regular season
Galatasaray Doğa Sigorta	EuroCup	Regular season
Tofaş	EuroCup	Regular season
Türk Telekom	EuroCup	Regular season
Banvit	Champions League	Round of 16
Beşiktaş Sompo Japan	Champions League	Round of 16
Adatıp Sakarya BB	Champions League	Third qualifying round
Adatıp Sakarya BB	FIBA Europe Cup	Regular season
Pınar Karşıyaka	FIBA Europe Cup	Quarter-finals
İstanbul BB	FIBA Europe Cup	Regular season
