= 2015–16 Basketbol Süper Ligi =

Basketball league in Turkey

Basketbol Süper Ligi
- Season: 2015–16
- Duration: October 10, 2015 – TBD
- Games played: 240 (Regular season)
- Teams: 16
- TV partners: Lig TV; NTV Spor; TBFTV.org

Regular season
- Relegated: Torku Konyaspor; Türk Telekom

Finals
- Champions: Fenerbahçe (7th title)
- Runners-up: Anadolu Efes
- Finals MVP: (Italy) Luigi Datome

Statistical leaders
| Points | (France) Adrien Moerman | 18.0 |
| Rebounds | (France) Adrien Moerman | 10.1 |
| Assists | (France) Thomas Heurtel | 5.7 |

The 2015–16 Basketbol Süper Ligi was the 50th season of the top-tier professional basketball league in Turkey. The season started on October 10, 2015 and ended on June 13, 2016. Fenerbahçe won its 7th national championship this season.

This was the first season the league's name was Basketbol Süper Ligi (BSL) instead of Turkish Basketball League (TBL).

== Teams ==
=== Promotion and relegation ===
- Relegated to TBL
  - Eskişehir Basket (15th)
  - Tofaş (16th)
- Promoted from TBL
  - Akın Çorap Yeşilgiresun Belediyespor (1st)
  - Demir İnşaat Büyükçekmece (2nd)

=== Locations and stadia ===
Istanbul teams
Locations of the 2015–16 Turkish Basketball Super League Clubs

| Club | Location | Founded | Arena | Capacity | Last season (Note: Standings of the 2014–15 Turkish Basketball League, adjusted to results in the Playoffs.) |
|---|---|---|---|---|---|
| Anadolu Efes | Istanbul | 1976 | Abdi İpekçi Arena | 12,270 | 2nd |
| Banvit | Bandırma | 1994 | Kara Ali Acar Sport Hall | 3,000 | 6th |
| Beşiktaş Sompo Japan | Istanbul | 1933 | Sinan Erdem Dome | 16,000 | 9th |
| Darüşşafaka Doğuş | Istanbul | 1951 | Darüşşafaka Ayhan Şahenk Sports Hall | 3,500 | 5th |
| Fenerbahçe | Istanbul | 1913 | Ülker Sports Arena | 13,800 | 3rd |
| Galatasaray Odeabank | Istanbul | 1911 | Abdi İpekçi Arena | 12,270 | 8th |
| İstanbul BB | Istanbul | 2000 | Cebeci Sport Hall | 1,250 | 12th |
| Pınar Karşıyaka | İzmir | 1966 | Karşıyaka Arena | 5,000 | 1st |
| Royal Halı Gaziantep | Gaziantep | 2007 | Karataş Şahinbey Sport Hall | 6,400 | 10th |
| Rönesans TED Ankara Kolejliler | Ankara | 1954 | Ankara Arena | 10,400 | 14th |
| Torku Konyaspor | Konya | 1987 | Selçuklu Belediyesi Sport Hall | 3,800 | 11th |
| Trabzonspor Medical Park | Trabzon | 2008 | Hayri Gür Arena | 7,500 | 4th |
| Türk Telekom | Ankara | 1980 | Ankara Arena | 10,400 | 7th |
| Demir İnşaat Büyükçekmece | Istanbul | 2011 | Gazanfer Bilge Spor Salonu | 3,000 | TB2L – 2nd |
| Muratbey Uşak Sportif | Uşak | 2006 | Uşak Üniversitesi Sport Hall | 2,000 | 13th |
| Akın Çorap Yeşilgiresun Belediyespor | Giresun | 2006 | 19 Eylül Sports Hall | 3,500 | TB2L – 1st |

=== Personnel and kits ===
| Team | Coach | Captain | Kit manufacturer | Shirt sponsor |
|---|---|---|---|---|
| Anadolu Efes | (Turkey) Ahmet Çakı | (Turkey) Doğuş Balbay | Adidas | Kia Motors |
| Banvit | (Turkey) Selçuk Ernak | (United States) Keith Simmons | Sportive | Banvit |
| Beşiktaş Sompo Japan | (Turkey) Yağızer Uluğ | (Turkey) Muratcan Güler | Adidas | Sompo Japan |
| Darüşşafaka Doğuş | (Turkey) Oktay Mahmuti | (Turkey) Ender Arslan | Sportive | Doğuş Holding |
| Fenerbahçe | (Serbia) Željko Obradović | (Turkey) Melih Mahmutoğlu | Nike | Metro |
| Galatasaray Odeabank | (Turkey) Ergin Ataman | (Turkey) Sinan Güler | GS Store | Odeabank |
| İstanbul BB | (Turkey) Ertuğrul Erdoğan | (Croatia) Damir Markota | Adidas | Kiptaş |
| Pınar Karşıyaka | (Turkey) Ufuk Sarıca | (Turkey) İnanç Koç | Sportive | Pınar |
| Royal Halı Gaziantep | (Greece) Stefanos Dedas | (Turkey) Erden Eryüz | Sportive | Royal Halı |
| Rönesans TED Ankara Kolejliler | (Turkey) Hasan Özmeriç | (Turkey) Önder Külçebaş | Upa | Rönesans Holding |
| Torku Konyaspor | (Bosnia and Herzegovina) Aziz Bekir | (Turkey) Valentin Pastal | AND1 | Torku |
| Trabzonspor Medical Park | (Turkey) Ahmet Kandemir | (Turkey) Alper Saruhan | Hummel | Medical Park |
| Türk Telekom | (Turkey) Burak Bıyıktay | (Albania) Ermal Kuqo | Erreà | Huawei |
| Demir İnşaat Büyükçekmece | (Turkey) Özhan Çıvgın | (Turkey) Nihat Emre Ekim | Sportive | Demir İnşaat |
| Muratbey Uşak Sportif | (Turkey) Ozan Bulkaz | (Turkey) Mesut Ademoğlu | Hummel | Muratbey |
| Akın Çorap Yeşilgiresun Belediyespor | (Serbia) Aleksandar Trifunović | (United States) Doron Perkins | Sportive | Akın Çorap |

== Regular season ==
=== League table ===
| Pos | Team | Pld | W | L | PF | PA | PD | Pts | Qualification or relegation |
|---|---|---|---|---|---|---|---|---|---|
| 1 | Anadolu Efes | 30 | 24 | 6 | 2543 | 2255 | +288 | 54 | Advance to Playoffs |
| 2 | Fenerbahçe | 30 | 24 | 6 | 2539 | 2275 | +264 | 54 | Advance to Playoffs |
| 3 | Galatasaray | 30 | 22 | 8 | 2508 | 2323 | +185 | 52 | Advance to Playoffs |
| 4 | Darüşşafaka Doğuş | 30 | 20 | 10 | 2319 | 2173 | +146 | 50 | Advance to Playoffs |
| 5 | Banvit | 30 | 18 | 12 | 2494 | 2413 | +81 | 48 | Advance to Playoffs |
| 6 | Pınar Karşıyaka | 30 | 17 | 13 | 2430 | 2345 | +85 | 47 | Advance to Playoffs |
| 7 | Uşak Sportif | 30 | 16 | 14 | 2351 | 2410 | −59 | 46 | Advance to Playoffs |
| 8 | Royal Halı Gaziantep | 30 | 15 | 15 | 2361 | 2385 | −24 | 45 | Advance to Playoffs |
| 9 | Beşiktaş Sompo Japan | 30 | 15 | 15 | 2425 | 2450 | −25 | 45 | |
| 10 | Demir İnşaat Büyükçekmece | 30 | 14 | 16 | 2401 | 2472 | −71 | 44 | |
| 11 | Trabzonspor Medical Park | 30 | 12 | 18 | 2284 | 2327 | −43 | 42 | |
| 12 | Yeşilgiresun Belediye | 30 | 11 | 19 | 2354 | 2469 | −115 | 41 | |
| 13 | İstanbul BB | 30 | 10 | 20 | 2406 | 2546 | −140 | 40 | |
| 14 | Rönesans TED Kolejliler | 30 | 9 | 21 | 2324 | 2437 | −113 | 39 | |
| 15 | Türk Telekom (R) | 30 | 7 | 23 | 2407 | 2568 | −161 | 37 | Relegation to TBL |
| 16 | Torku Konyaspor (R) | 30 | 6 | 24 | 2194 | 2492 | −298 | 36 | Relegation to TBL |

Updated to match(es) played on 10 May 2016. Source: TBL
(R) Relegated

=== Results ===
| Home \ Away | AEF | BAN | BJK | DAÇ | FEN | GAL | İBB | KSK | RHG | TED | KON | TSB | TTS | BÇK | UŞK | YGR |
|---|---|---|---|---|---|---|---|---|---|---|---|---|---|---|---|---|
| Anadolu Efes | | 86–87 | 79–72 | 90–71 | 93–84 | 78–85 | 87–77 | 91–87 | 96–99 | 75–72 | 98–71 | 81–73 | 87–77 | 94–69 | 71–65 | 89–74 |
| Banvit | 87–92 | | 83–68 | 76–65 | 76–75 | 82–75 | 84–77 | 83–78 | 83–76 | 92–70 | 92–90 | 88–69 | 91–82 | 74–85 | 67–73 | 87–77 |
| Beşiktaş Sompo Japan | 79–73 | 96–87 | | 80–74 | 76–91 | 71–76 | 103–91 | 79–96 | 84–95 | 74–69 | 73–58 | 85–74 | 83–80 | 98–94 | 95–91 | 87–68 |
| Darüşşafaka Doğuş | 76–80 | 75–66 | 99–86 | | 65–70 | 76–83 | 73–64 | 78–67 | 90–65 | 82–69 | 90–63 | 76–71 | 76–69 | 82–76 | 92–52 | 88–79 |
| Fenerbahçe | 73–69 | 84–75 | 100–80 | 94–74 | | 77–68 | 73–55 | 104–82 | 97–85 | 97–81 | 73–74 | 81–70 | 96–93 | 86–64 | 98–67 | 100–79 |
| Galatasaray | 60–71 | 96–86 | 90–76 | 70–72 | 80–63 | | 90–80 | 74–67 | 78–63 | 75–65 | 78–65 | 85–66 | 139–134 | 101–96 | 92–84 | 90–74 |
| İstanbul BB | 66–94 | 94–88 | 74–69 | 84–87 | 67–90 | 67–79 | | 80–105 | 81–77 | 74–72 | 79–81 | 89–74 | 80–84 | 85–88 | 88–95 | 91–70 |
| Pınar Karşıyaka | 77–89 | 64–71 | 77–59 | 73–74 | 86–81 | 97–92 | 90–81 | | 67–65 | 90–79 | 82–60 | 74–71 | 100–74 | 74–69 | 81–80 | 87–83 |
| Royal Halı Gaziantep | 97–96 | 83–81 | 80–78 | 53–59 | 75–83 | 67–70 | 71–65 | 97–81 | | 90–80 | 63–61 | 82–83 | 83–79 | 86–74 | 87–82 | 73–82 |
| TED Ankara Kolejliler | 66–89 | 101–99 | 83–94 | 71–84 | 70–71 | 78–88 | 80–82 | 65–62 | 86–75 | | 73–76 | 74–70 | 89–70 | 67–75 | 86–92 | 80–74 |
| Torku Konyaspor | 52–85 | 74–92 | 76–88 | 76–91 | 68–72 | 68–82 | 87–101 | 79–77 | 59–72 | 95–100 | | 70–73 | 79–61 | 101–105 | 75–64 | 76–81 |
| Trabzonspor MP | 65–73 | 88–91 | 96–99 | 62–56 | 77–95 | 58–80 | 87–65 | 67–63 | 73–68 | 63–79 | 103–70 | | 76–65 | 69–73 | 98–66 | 92–88 |
| Türk Telekom | 87–89 | 88–93 | 65–79 | 72–82 | 83–85 | 91–85 | 100–111 | 70–76 | 99–102 | 76–72 | 95–81 | 80–90 | | 71–79 | 81–68 | 81–69 |
| Demir İnşaat Büyükçekmece | 61–91 | 74–67 | 86–76 | 63–70 | 85–76 | 94–89 | 91–90 | 99–100 | 81–97 | 89–93 | 75–72 | 75–71 | 64–70 | | 80–83 | 75–67 |
| Uşak Sportif | 77–84 | 64–80 | 66–64 | 72–70 | 82–93 | 73–71 | 90–73 | 79–72 | 79–70 | 74–67 | 86–69 | 94–86 | 95–79 | 79–70 | | 79–86 |
| Yeşilgiresun Belediye | 69–73 | 94–86 | 79–74 | 77–72 | 76–77 | 84–87 | 87–95 | 72–98 | 78–65 | 90–87 | 88–68 | 62–69 | 69–51 | 93–92 | 85–100 | |

Updated to match(es) played on 11 May 2016. Source: TBL Fixtures
Legend: Blue = home team win; Yellow = draw; Red = away team win.

== Playoffs ==
Quarterfinals
1 | Anadolu Efes | 2
8 | Royal Halı Gaziantep | 0
4 | Darüşşafaka Doğuş | 2
5 | Banvit | 0
2 | Fenerbahçe | 2
7 | Uşak Sportif | 0
3 | Galatasaray Odeabank | 2
6 | Pınar Karşıyaka | 1

Semifinals
1 | Anadolu Efes | 3
4 | Darüşşafaka Doğuş | 0
2 | Fenerbahçe | 3
3 | Galatasaray Odeabank | 1

Finals
1 | Anadolu Efes | 2
2 | Fenerbahçe | 4

== Clubs in European competitions ==
| Team | Competition | Progress |
|---|---|---|
| Fenerbahçe | Euroleague | Runners-up |
| Anadolu Efes | Euroleague | Top 16 |
| Darüşşafaka S.K. | Euroleague | Top 16 |
| Galatasaray | Eurocup | Champion |
| Banvit | Eurocup | Last 16 |
| Pınar Karşıyaka | Eurocup | Last 16 |
| Trabzonspor Medical Park | Eurocup | Last 32 |
| Beşiktaş Sompo Japan | Eurocup | Regular Season |
| Royal Halı Gaziantep | FIBA Europe Cup | Last 16 |
| Türk Telekom | FIBA Europe Cup | Last 16 |

== All-Star Game ==
Team Europe
| Pos | Player | Team |
Starters
| G | (France) Thomas Heurtel | Anadolu Efes |
| G | (Turkey) Sinan Güler | Galatasaray Odeabank |
| F | (Turkey) Cedi Osman | Anadolu Efes |
| F | (Serbia) Vladimir Micov | Galatasaray Odeabank |
| C | (Turkey) Semih Erden | Darüşşafaka Doğuş |
Reserves
| G | (United States) Scottie Wilbekin | Darüşşafaka Doğuş |
| G | (United States) Randy Culpepper | Beşiktaş İntegral Forex |
| G | (United States) Michael Roll | Demir İnşaat Büyükçekmece |
| F | (Turkey) Furkan Korkmaz | Anadolu Efes |
| F | (Poland) Maciej Lampe | Beşiktaş İntegral Forex |
| F | (Turkey) Furkan Aldemir | Darüşşafaka Doğuş |
| C | (United States) Joey Dorsey | Galatasaray Odeabank |
Head coach: (Turkey) Ergin Ataman (Galatasaray Odeabank)

Team Asia
| Pos | Player | Team |
Starters
| G | (Turkey) Bobby Dixon | Fenerbahçe |
| G | (Turkey) Kenan Sipahi | Pınar Karşıyaka |
| F | (Serbia) Bogdan Bogdanović | Fenerbahçe |
| F | (United States) Kenny Gabriel | Pınar Karşıyaka |
| C | (Czech Republic) Jan Veselý | Fenerbahçe |
Reserves
| G | (United States) Courtney Fortson | Banvit |
| G | (United States) Dwight Hardy | Trabzonspor Medical Park |
| G | (United States) Clay Tucker | Torku Konyaspor |
| F | (United States) Tony Crocker | Yeşilgiresun Belediye |
| F | (Turkey) Tolga Geçim | Banvit |
| F | (France) Adrien Moerman | Banvit |
| C | (Canada) Khem Birch | Uşak Sportif |
Head coach: (Turkey) Selçuk Ernak (Banvit)

January 24, 2015
17:00 EEST

| Team Europe | 136–156 | Team Asia |
| Pts: Scottie Wilbekin 23; Rebs: Maciej Lampe 8 Asts: Sinan Güler, Scottie Wilbekin 6 | | Pts: Kenny Gabriel 34; Rebs: Kenny Gabriel 12; Asts: Courtney Fortson 12 |

Ülker Sports Arena, Istanbul
Attendance: 13,000
Referees: Recep Ankaralı, Engin Kennermann, Mehmet Keseratar
