= 2026–27 Galatasaray S.K. (men's basketball) season =

Galatasaray MCT Technic
2026–27 season
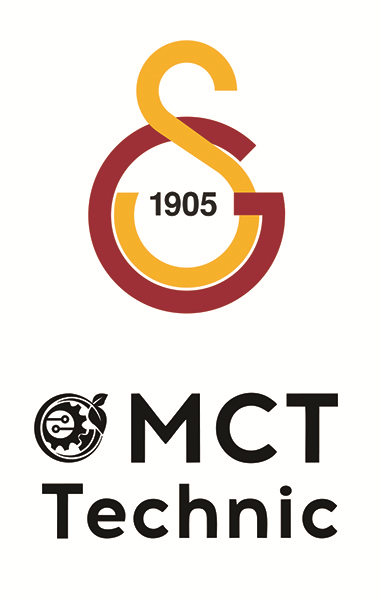
- President: Dursun Özbek
- Head coach: Gianmarco Pozzecco (until 16 October 2026); Manuchar Markoishvili (from 16 October 2026)
- Arena: Sinan Erdem Dome
- Basketbol Süper Ligi: Regular season
- Basketball Champions League: Regular season
- Turkish Basketball Cup: Preseason

The 2026–27 season is Galatasaray's 115th season in the existence of the club. The team plays in the Basketball Super League and in the Basketball Champions League.

== Season overview ==
=== Pre-season ===
On 8 June, Özgün Önver has been appointed as the General Manager of Galatasaray Men's Basketball Team.

On 22 June, It has been announced that Vladimir Micov, who served as Sporting Director, has parted ways with the club.

On 8 July, Galatasaray's opponents in the 2026–27 Basketball Champions League season have been determined. Galatasaray, participating in the draw from the first pot, was drawn into Group B alongside French representative Strasbourg, Polish team Legia Warsaw, and Croatian representative Cibona.

On 6 August, Basketbol Süper Ligi 2026–27 Season fixtures have been announced.

On 14 August, Galatasaray friendly match schedule has been announced.

On 27 August, It was announced that Buğrahan Tuncer will be the team captain for the 2026–27 season.

=== October ===
On 16 October, Galatasaray has parted ways with head coach Gianmarco Pozzecco.

== Players ==
=== Current roster ===
Note: Flags indicate national team eligibility at FIBA-sanctioned events. Players may hold other non-FIBA nationalities not displayed.

Galatasaray roster
Players
Coaches

Pos.	No.	Nat.	Name	Ht.	Wt.	Age
SG	1	(United States)	Robinson, Jerome	1.93 m (6 ft 4 in)	86 kg (190 lb)	29 – 22 February 1997
G	2	(Turkey)	Hazer, Şehmus	1.91 m (6 ft 3 in)	90 kg (198 lb)	27 – 15 February 1999
PF	3	(Turkey)	Durmaz, Berkan	2.06 m (6 ft 9 in)	91 kg (201 lb)	29 – 20 February 1997
PG	4	(Turkey)	Tekin, Zekeriya Yiğit	1.88 m (6 ft 2 in)	75 kg (165 lb)	22 – 13 May 2004
PG	5	(Slovenia)	Nikolić, Aleksej	1.91 m (6 ft 3 in)	92 kg (203 lb)	31 – 21 February 1995
PG	8	(Turkey)	Korkmaz, Can	1.88 m (6 ft 2 in)	83 kg (183 lb)	34 – 21 October 1992
F/C	9	(Serbia)	Smailagić, Alen	2.08 m (6 ft 10 in)	98 kg (216 lb)	26 – 18 August 2000
PF/C	10	(Nigeria) (United States)	Metu, Chimezie (DC)	2.08 m (6 ft 10 in)	102 kg (225 lb)	29 – 22 March 1997
C	11	(Mali)	Ballo, Oumar	2.13 m (7 ft 0 in)	118 kg (260 lb)	24 – 13 July 2002
SF	12	(Belgium)	Bleijenbergh, Vrenz	2.11 m (6 ft 11 in)	95 kg (209 lb)	26 – 14 October 2000
PF	15	(Turkey)	Şekeroğlu, Efe	2.08 m (6 ft 10 in)	97 kg (214 lb)	22 – 13 April 2004
PG	18	(Montenegro)	Ivanović, Nikola (injured)	1.90 m (6 ft 3 in)	85 kg (187 lb)	32 – 19 February 1994
G	19	(Turkey)	Tuncer, Buğrahan (C)	1.93 m (6 ft 4 in)	90 kg (198 lb)	33 – 23 March 1993
F	21	(Canada)	Pierre, Dyshawn	1.98 m (6 ft 6 in)	104 kg (229 lb)	33 – 17 November 1993
PG	25	(United States)	Simpson, KJ	1.88 m (6 ft 2 in)	86 kg (190 lb)	24 – 8 August 2002

Head coach

- (Georgia (country)) Manuchar Markoishvili

Assistant coach(es)

- (Turkey) Gökhan Turan
- (Ukraine) Sergiy Gladyr
- (Turkey) Evren Karademir
- (Turkey) Arca Yıldırım

Athletic trainer(s)

- (Turkey) Ertan Bedir
- (Turkey) Yahya Keçeci

Physiotherapist(s)

- (Turkey) Aşkın Dede
- (Turkey) Ali Can Kaşlı

Team manager

- (Turkey) İbrahim Tilki

Legend

- (C) Team captain
- (DC) Dual citizenship
- Injured

- Roster
Updated: 25 October 2026

=== Depth chart ===
Pos.	Starting 5	Bench 1	Bench 2	Bench 3	Inactive
C	Oumar Ballo	Alen Smailagić
PF	Chimezie Metu	Berkan Durmaz	Efe Şekeroğlu
SF	Dyshawn Pierre	Vrenz Bleijenbergh
SG	Şehmus Hazer	Jerome Robinson	Buğrahan Tuncer	Zekeriya Yiğit Tekin
PG	Aleksej Nikolić	KJ Simpson	Can Korkmaz		Nikola Ivanović (injured)

(colours: Turkish or homegrown players; foreign players)

=== Squad changes ===
==== In ====
No.	Pos.	Nat.	Name	Age	Moving from		Type	Contract	Ends	Transfer fee	Date	Source
21	F	(Canada)	Dyshawn Pierre	32	UNICS Kazan	(Russia)	1 year	June 2027	Free	3 July 2026		
3	PF	(Turkey)	Berkan Durmaz	29	Türk Telekom	(Turkey)	1 year	June 2027	Free	5 July 2026		
2	G	(Turkey)	Şehmus Hazer	27	Anadolu Efes	(Turkey)	1 year	June 2027	Free	7 July 2026		
5	PG	(Slovenia)	Aleksej Nikolić	31	Cedevita Olimpija	(Slovenia)	1 year	June 2027	Free	9 July 2026		
10	PF/C	(Nigeria) (United States)	Chimezie Metu	29	Dreamland Gran Canaria	(Spain)	1 year	June 2027	Free	10 July 2026		
12	SF	(Belgium)	Vrenz Bleijenbergh	25	Yukatel Merkezefendi Belediyesi	(Turkey)	1 year	June 2027	Free	13 July 2026		
18	PG	(Montenegro)	Nikola Ivanović	32	Pallacanestro Brescia	(Italy)	1 year	June 2027	Free	18 July 2026		
9	F/C	(Serbia)	Alen Smailagić	25	Virtus Bologna	(Italy)	1 year	June 2027	Free	6 August 2026		
11	C	(Mali)	Oumar Ballo	24	Pallacanestro Cantù	(Italy)	1 year	June 2027	Free	7 August 2026		
25	PG	(United States)	KJ Simpson	24	Grand Rapids Gold	(United States)	1 year	June 2027	Free	14 October 2026		

==== Out ====
No.	Pos.	Nat.	Name	Age	Moving to		Type	Transfer fee	Date	Source
77	C	(Turkey)	Muhsin Yaşar	30	Safiport Erokspor	(Turkey)	End of contract	Free	16 June 2026	
0	G	(United States)	Boogie Ellis	25	Joventut Badalona	(Spain)	End of contract	Free	23 June 2026	
22	G/F	(United States) (Italy)	John Petrucelli	33	Napoli Basket	(Italy)	End of contract	Free	23 June 2026	
10	PG	(Turkey)	Rıdvan Öncel	29	Trabzonspor	(Turkey)	End of contract	Free	24 June 2026	
9	F	(United States)	John Meeks	27	Yukatel Denizli Basket	(Turkey)	End of contract	Free	25 June 2026	
35	PF	(United States)	Fabian White Jr.	27	Çayırova Belediyespor	(Turkey)	End of contract	Free	25 June 2026	
33	C	(United States)	Freddie Gillespie	29	Ironi Ness Ziona	(Israel)	End of contract	Free	25 June 2026	
12	SG	(United States)	James Palmer Jr.	29	Osaka Evessa	(Japan)	End of contract	Free	29 June 2026	
3	G	(United States)	Errick McCollum	38	Safiport Erokspor	(Turkey)	End of contract	Free	30 June 2026	
17	G	(Turkey)	Kerem Erdem	20	Konya Gelişim SK	(Turkey)	End of contract	Free	8 July 2026	
24	SG	(Turkey)	Yaman Alişan	20	Yukatel Denizli Basket	(Turkey)	End of contract	Free	8 July 2026	
5	PF	(Turkey)	Tibet Görener	23	Petkim Spor	(Turkey)	End of contract	Free	8 July 2026	
16	C	(Turkey)	Cihat Dalgalı	25	iLab Basketbol	(Turkey)	End of contract	Free	8 July 2026	

==== Contract extension ====
No.	Pos.	Nat.	Name	Age	Cont.	Date	Source
8	PG	(Turkey)	Can Korkmaz	33	1-year	26 June 2026	
19	G	(Turkey)	Buğrahan Tuncer	33	2-year	29 June 2026	

== Club ==
=== Staff ===
As of 18 October 2026

Staff member	Position
Özgün Önver	General Manager
İbrahim Tilki	Team Manager
Manuchar Markoishvili	Head Coach
Sergiy Gladyr	Assistant Coach
Gökhan Turan	Assistant Coach
Evren Karademir	Assistant Coach
Arca Yıldırım	Assistant Coach
Ertan Bedir	Athletic Performance Coach
Yahya Keçeci	Athletic Performance Coach
Emir Akmanlı	Communication and Media Specialist
Sinan Üstündağ	Doctor
Aşkın Dede	Physiotherapist
Ali Can Kaşlı	Physiotherapist
Burak Kozan	Masseur
Adnan Güney	Material Manager
Lara Kratzer	Foreign Relations Officer
Yunus Ün	Foreign Relations Officer
Vahit Yılmaz	Transportation Officer

=== Staff changes ===
Change	Date	Staff member	Staff position	Ref.
Out	July 2026	(Turkey) Cem Güven	Assistant Coach	
Out	July 2026	(Turkey) Batuhan Aybars Aksu	Assistant Coach	
Out	July 2026	(Italy) Davide Bonora	Assistant Coach	
Out	16 October 2026	(Italy) Gianmarco Pozzecco	Head Coach	
In	16 October 2026	(Georgia (country)) Manuchar Markoishvili	Head Coach	
In	16 October 2026	(Ukraine) Sergiy Gladyr	Assistant Coach	
In	16 October 2026	(Turkey) Evren Karademir	Assistant Coach	
In	16 October 2026	(Turkey) Arca Yıldırım	Assistant Coach	
In	16 October 2026	(Turkey) Yahya Keçeci	Athletic Performance Coach	

=== Uniform ===
Home	Away	Third

=== Sponsorship and kit manufacturers ===
- Supplier: Puma
- Name sponsor: MCT Technic
- Main sponsor: MCT Technic
- Back sponsor: 1905 GSYİAD
- Sleeve sponsor: —
- Lateral sponsor: Oceanist, Zade Vital
- Short sponsor: AVS Global, Oceanist, Zade Vital
- Socks sponsor: —

== Pre-season and friendlies ==
1 September 2026 Friendly	Galatasaray MCT Technic (Turkish Basketball Federation)	87–69	(Romanian Basketball Federation) CSM Oradea	Zeytinburnu, Istanbul, Turkey
		Boxscore		Arena: Basketball Development Center

5 September 2026 Gloria Cup	Tofaş (Turkish Basketball Federation)	81–60	(Turkish Basketball Federation) Galatasaray MCT Technic	Belek, Antalya, Turkey
		Boxscore		Arena: Gloria Sports Arena

8 September 2026 Gloria Cup	Galatasaray MCT Technic (Turkish Basketball Federation)	89–93	(Turkish Basketball Federation) Yukatel Denizli Basket	Belek, Antalya, Turkey
		Boxscore		Arena: Gloria Sports Arena

10 September 2026 Gloria Cup	Galatasaray MCT Technic (Turkish Basketball Federation)	75–65	(Russian Basketball Federation) CSKA Moscow	Belek, Antalya, Turkey
		Boxscore		Arena: Gloria Sports Arena

13 September 2026 Friendly	Çayırova Belediyesi (Turkish Basketball Federation)	75–80	(Turkish Basketball Federation) Galatasaray MCT Technic	Çayırova, Kocaeli, Turkey
		Boxscore		Arena: Çayırova Spor Salonu

18 September 2026 Cevat Soydaş Tournament	Trabzonspor (Turkish Basketball Federation)	65–77	(Turkish Basketball Federation) Galatasaray MCT Technic	Nilüfer, Bursa, Turkey
		Boxscore		Arena: Tofaş Spor Salonu

19 September 2026 Cevat Soydaş Tournament	Tofaş (Turkish Basketball Federation)	81–76	(Turkish Basketball Federation) Galatasaray MCT Technic	Nilüfer, Bursa, Turkey
		Boxscore		Arena: Tofaş Spor Salonu

== Competitions ==
=== Overall ===
Competition	Started round	Final position / round	First match	Last match
Basketbol Süper Ligi	Round 1		26 September 2026	
Basketball Champions League	Round 1		6 October 2026	
Turkish Basketball Cup	—			

Updated to match played 6 October 2026
Source: Competitions

=== Overview ===
Competition	Record							
Competition	Pld	W	D	L	PF	PA	PD	Win %
Basketbol Süper Ligi	9	5	0	4	782	702	+80	55.56
Basketball Champions League	4	2	0	2	319	333	−14	50.00
Turkish Basketball Cup	0	0	0	0	0	0	+0	—
Total	13	7	0	6	1,101	1,035	+66	53.85

Last updated: 22 November 2026
Source: Competitions

=== Basketbol Süper Ligi ===
==== League table ====
Pos	Team	Pld	W	L	PF	PA	PD	Pts	Qualification or relegation
3	Anadolu Efes	9	6	3	754	703	+51	15	Advance to playoffs
4	Fenerbahçe Tarfin	9	6	3	773	724	+49	15	Advance to playoffs
5	Galatasaray MCT Technic	9	5	4	782	702	+80	14	Advance to playoffs
6	Beşiktaş Fuzul	9	5	4	757	763	−6	14	Advance to playoffs
7	Petkim Spor	9	5	4	738	750	−12	14	Advance to playoffs

Updated to match(es) played on 22 November 2026. Source: Basketbol Süper Ligi

==== Results summary ====
Overall						Home					Away				
Pld	W	L	PF	PA	PD	W	L	PF	PA	PD	W	L	PF	PA	PD
9	5	4	782	702	+80	4	1	463	385	+78	1	3	319	317	+2

Last updated: 22 November 2026.
Source: TBF.org.tr

==== Results by round ====
Round	1	2	3	4	5	6	7	8	9	10	11	12	13	14	15	16	17	18	19	20	21	22	23	24	25	26	27	28	29	30
Ground	H	A	H	A	H	A	H	A	H	A	H	A	H	A	A	A	H	A	H	A	H	A	H	A	H	A	H	A	H	H
Result	W	L	L	L	W	W	W	L	W																					
Position	1	4	8	12	8	7	5	6	5																					

Updated to match(es) played on 22 November 2026. Source: TBF.org.tr
A = Away; H = Home; W = Win; L = Loss

==== Matches ====
Win Loss

Note: All times are TRT (UTC+3) as listed by Turkish Basketball Federation.

26 September 2026 1	Galatasaray MCT Technic	102–79	Çayırova Belediyesi	Ataköy, Istanbul, Turkey
18:00 TRT (UTC+3)	Scoring by quarter: 26–18, 31–25, 21–30, 24–6
	Pts: Pierre, Smailagić 16; Rebs: Metu 9 Asts: Metu 6 PIR: Smailagić 23	Boxscore; Report	Pts: Crawford 21; Rebs: Simmons 6 Asts: Crawford 11; PIR: Crawford 27	Arena: Sinan Erdem Dome; Attendance: 2,452; Referees: Ziya Özorhon, Orhan Çağrı Hekimoğlu, Tolga Akkuşoğlu

2 October 2026 2	Karşıyaka	78–71(OT)	Galatasaray MCT Technic	İzmir
19:00 TRT (UTC+3)	Scoring by quarter: 18–13, 17–21, 15–14, 15–17, Overtime: 13–6
	Pts: El-Amin 18; Rebs: Gültekin 7 Asts: El-Amin, Weber 3 PIR: Enoch 20	Boxscore; Report	Pts: Ballo, Hazer 13; Rebs: Ballo 15; Asts: Pierre 3 PIR: Ballo 23	Arena: Karşıyaka Arena; Attendance: 0 Referees: Can Mavisu, Seher Ayşe Nur Yazıcıoğlu, Musa Kazım Çetin

12 October 2026 3	Galatasaray MCT Technic	88–93	Bursaspor	Ataköy, Istanbul, Turkey
19:00 TRT (UTC+3)	Scoring by quarter: 20–20, 21–25, 19–21, 28–27
	Pts: Ivanović 18; Rebs: Pierre 8 Asts: Tuncer 5 PIR: Ivanović 18	Boxscore; Report	Pts: Hammonds 25; Rebs: Washington 7 Asts: Taylor 10; PIR: Taylor 28	Arena: Sinan Erdem Dome; Attendance: 1,854; Referees: Kaan Büyükçil, Ahmet Tatlıcı, Uğur Akyıldız

18 October 2026 4	Beşiktaş	83–80	Galatasaray MCT Technic	Zeytinburnu, Istanbul
20:30 TRT (UTC+3)	Scoring by quarter: 19–22, 25–17, 20–21, 19–20
	Pts: Korkmaz 18; Rebs: Žižić 7 Asts: Uğurlu 6 PIR: Korkmaz 16	Boxscore; Report	Pts: three players 12; Rebs: Pierre 8 Asts: Hazer 4 PIR: Metu 15	Arena: Basketball Development Center; Attendance: 4,829; Referees: Yener Yılmaz, Alper Altuğ Köselerli, Kerem Yılmaz

25 October 2026 5	Galatasaray MCT Technic	102–68	Pizzabulls Bordo Bandırma	Ataköy, Istanbul, Turkey
20:30 TRT (UTC+3)	Scoring by quarter: 21–19, 17–15, 30–11, 34–23
	Pts: Durmaz, Smailagić 18; Rebs: Ballo 9 Asts: Tuncer 11; PIR: Durmaz, Smailagić 23	Boxscore; Report	Pts: Peterson 17; Rebs: Toure 9 Asts: Gordon, Peterson 3 PIR: Gordon 14	Arena: Sinan Erdem Dome; Attendance: 1,775; Referees: Hüseyin Çelik, Özge Şentürk Bayraktar, Murat Ciner

31 October 2026 6	Yukatel Denizli Basket	74–87	Galatasaray MCT Technic	Denizli
20:30 TRT (UTC+3)	Scoring by quarter: 17–17, 12–24, 21–23, 24–23
	Pts: Meeks 19; Rebs: Meeks 7 Asts: Bailey Jr. 7 PIR: Meeks 20	Boxscore; Report	Pts: Smailagić 20; Rebs: Simpson 6 Asts: three players 4 PIR: Smailagić 24	Arena: Pamukkale University Arena; Attendance: 3,000; Referees: Ziya Özorhon, Tolga Akkuşoğlu, Nazlı Çisil Güngör

8 November 2026 7	Galatasaray MCT Technic	90–81	Esenler Erokspor	Ataköy, Istanbul, Turkey
18:00 TRT (UTC+3)	Scoring by quarter: 24–13, 16–26, 19–20, 31–22
	Pts: Metu 20; Rebs: Metu 8 Asts: Tuncer 6 PIR: Metu 29	Boxscore; Report	Pts: Arna 19; Rebs: Arna 5 Asts: Arna 8 PIR: Arna 28	Arena: Sinan Erdem Dome; Attendance: 1,224; Referees: Emin Moğulkoç, Kaan Büyükçil, Musa Kazım Çetin

14 November 2026 8	Glint Körfez Basket	82–81	Galatasaray MCT Technic	Manisa
18:00 TRT (UTC+3)	Scoring by quarter: 20–14, 24–23, 26–23, 12–21
	Pts: Davis 22; Rebs: Davis, Reese 8 Asts: Buie, Davis 3 PIR: Davis 24	Boxscore; Report	Pts: Nikolić 21; Rebs: Metu 8 Asts: Metu, Tuncer 4 PIR: Nikolić 19	Arena: Muradiye Spor Salonu; Attendance: 3,920; Referees: Zafer Yılmaz, Ali Şakacı, Alper Gökçebel

22 November 2026 9	Galatasaray MCT Technic	81–64	Aliağa Petkim Spor	Ataköy, Istanbul, Turkey
18:00 TRT (UTC+3)	Scoring by quarter: 29–19, 13–22, 23–14, 16–9
	Pts: Hazer 14; Rebs: Durmaz 7 Asts: Hazer 5 PIR: Hazer 16	Boxscore; Report	Pts: Pasečņiks 15; Rebs: Onan 7 Asts: Onan 5 PIR: Pasečņiks 20	Arena: Sinan Erdem Dome; Attendance: 1,759; Referees: Alper Altuğ Köselerli, Ayşe Nur Yazıcıoğlu, Orhan Çağrı Hekimoğlu

5 December 2026 10	Tofaş	vs.	Galatasaray MCT Technic	Nilüfer, Bursa
20:30 TRT (UTC+3)
		Boxscore		Arena: Tofaş Spor Salonu

12 December 2026 11	Galatasaray MCT Technic	vs.	Anadolu Efes	Ataköy, Istanbul, Turkey
20:30 TRT (UTC+3)
		Boxscore		Arena: Sinan Erdem Dome

18 December 2026 12	Trabzonspor	vs.	Galatasaray MCT Technic	Trabzon
19:00 TRT (UTC+3)
		Boxscore		Arena: Hayri Gür Arena

13	Galatasaray MCT Technic	vs.	Türk Telekom	Ataköy, Istanbul, Turkey
		Boxscore		Arena: Sinan Erdem Dome

14	Fenerbahçe	vs.	Galatasaray MCT Technic	Istanbul
		Boxscore		Arena: Ülker Sports and Event Hall

15	Bahçeşehir Koleji	vs.	Galatasaray MCT Technic	Ataköy, Istanbul, Turkey
		Boxscore		Arena: Sinan Erdem Dome

16	Glint Çayırova Belediyesi	vs.	Galatasaray MCT Technic	Çayırova, Kocaeli, Turkey
		Boxscore		Arena: Çayırova Spor Salonu

17	Galatasaray MCT Technic	vs.	Karşıyaka	Ataköy, Istanbul, Turkey
		Boxscore		Arena: Sinan Erdem Dome

18	Bursaspor	vs.	Galatasaray MCT Technic	Nilüfer, Bursa
		Boxscore		Arena: Tofaş Spor Salonu

19	Galatasaray MCT Technic	vs.	Beşiktaş	Ataköy, Istanbul, Turkey
		Boxscore		Arena: Sinan Erdem Dome

20	Pizzabulls Bordo Bandırma	vs.	Galatasaray MCT Technic	Bandırma, Balıkesir, Turkey
		Boxscore		Arena: Bandırma 17 Eylül Üniversitesi Spor Salonu

21	Galatasaray MCT Technic	vs.	Yukatel Denizli Basket	Ataköy, Istanbul, Turkey
		Boxscore		Arena: Sinan Erdem Dome

22	Esenler Erokspor	vs.	Galatasaray MCT Technic	Ataköy, Istanbul, Turkey
		Boxscore		Arena: Sinan Erdem Dome

23	Galatasaray MCT Technic	vs.	Glint Körfez Basket	Ataköy, Istanbul, Turkey
		Boxscore		Arena: Sinan Erdem Dome

24	Aliağa Petkim Spor	vs.	Galatasaray MCT Technic	Aliağa, İzmir
		Boxscore		Arena: Enka Sport Hall

25	Galatasaray MCT Technic	vs.	Tofaş	Ataköy, Istanbul, Turkey
		Boxscore		Arena: Sinan Erdem Dome

26	Anadolu Efes	vs.	Galatasaray MCT Technic	Zeytinburnu, Istanbul
		Boxscore		Arena: Basketball Development Center

27	Galatasaray MCT Technic	vs.	Trabzonspor	Ataköy, Istanbul, Turkey
		Boxscore		Arena: Sinan Erdem Dome

28	Türk Telekom	vs.	Galatasaray MCT Technic	Ulus, Ankara
		Boxscore		Arena: Ankara Arena

29	Galatasaray MCT Technic	vs.	Fenerbahçe	Ataköy, Istanbul, Turkey
		Boxscore		Arena: Sinan Erdem Dome

30	Galatasaray MCT Technic	vs.	Bahçeşehir Koleji	Ataköy, Istanbul, Turkey
		Boxscore		Arena: Sinan Erdem Dome

=== Basketball Champions League ===
==== Regular season ====
===== Group B =====
Pos	Team	Pld	W	L	PF	PA	PD	Pts	Qualification	SIG	CIB	GSM	WAR
1	(French Federation of Basketball) SIG Strasbourg	4	2	2	351	316	+35	6	Advance to round of 16	—	95–70		100–62
2	(Croatian Basketball Federation) Cibona	4	2	2	344	345	−1	6	Advance to play-ins	101–79	—	96–76	77–95
3	(Turkish Basketball Federation) Galatasaray MCT Technic	4	2	2	319	333	−14	6	Advance to play-ins	83–77		—	88–81
4	(Polish Basketball Federation) Legia Warszawa	4	2	2	317	337	−20	6				79–72	—

Updated to match(es) played on November 18, 2026. Source: FIBA
Legend: Blue = home team win; Red = away team win.

==== Regular Season Matches ====
Win Loss

6 October 2026 RS1	Cibona (Croatia)	96–76	(Turkey) Galatasaray MCT Technic	Zagreb, Croatia
19:00 TRT (UTC+3)	Scoring by quarter: 24–24, 26–18, 21–19, 25–15
	Pts: Battle 32; Rebs: Lončar, Mazalin 5 Asts: McGill 6 PIR: Battle 33	Boxscore; Report	Pts: Nikolić, Smailagić 13; Rebs: Smailagić 9 Asts: Hazer 3 PIR: Smailagić 20	Arena: Dražen Petrović Basketball Hall; Attendance: 2,070; Referees: Julio Anaya (PAN), Gintaras Mačiulis (LTU), Ilias Karpanos (GRE)

20 October 2026 RS2	Galatasaray MCT Technic (Turkey)	83–77	(France) SIG Strasbourg	Ataköy, Istanbul, Turkey
20:00 TRT (UTC+3)	Scoring by quarter: 21–16, 21–17, 20–23, 21–21
	Pts: Simpson 17; Rebs: Metu, Simpson 8 Asts: Hazer, Nikolić 4 PIR: Simpson 22	Boxscore; Report	Pts: Lemoine 21; Rebs: N'Doye 7 Asts: N'Doye 6 PIR: Lemoine 21	Arena: Sinan Erdem Dome; Attendance: 1,223; Referees: Antonio Conde (ESP), Ritvars Helmsteins (LAT), Geert Jacobs (BEL)

4 November 2026 RS3	Legia Warszawa (Poland)	79–72	(Turkey) Galatasaray MCT Technic	Warsaw, Poland
20:00 TRT (UTC+3)	Scoring by quarter: 14–21, 20–11, 19–26, 26–14
	Pts: Freemantle 23; Rebs: Daniels 7 Asts: Daniels 8 PIR: Freemantle 21	Boxscore; Report	Pts: Metu 24; Rebs: Metu 9 Asts: Tuncer, Simpson 3 PIR: Metu 26	Arena: Arena COS Torwar; Attendance: 4,407; Referees: Boris Krejic (SLO), Mārtiņš Kozlovskis (LAT), Lorenzo Baldini (ITA)

18 November 2026 RS4	Galatasaray MCT Technic (Turkey)	88–81	(Poland) Legia Warszawa	Ataköy, Istanbul, Turkey
20:00 TRT (UTC+3)	Scoring by quarter: 25–20, 23–21, 21–20, 19–20
	Pts: Metu 20; Rebs: Metu 8 Asts: Hazer 5 PIR: Metu 29	Boxscore; Report	Pts: Daniels 26; Rebs: Freemantle 9 Asts: Daniels, Zoriks 6 PIR: Daniels 29	Arena: Sinan Erdem Dome; Referees: Julio Anaya (PAN), Ariadna Chueca Moreno (ESP), Ioannis Agrafiotis (GRE)

15 December 2026 RS5	SIG Strasbourg (France)	vs.	(Turkey) Galatasaray MCT Technic	Strasbourg, France
22:00 TRT (UTC+3)
		Boxscore		Arena: Rhénus Sport

23 December 2026 RS6	Galatasaray MCT Technic (Turkey)	vs.	(Croatia) Cibona	Ataköy, Istanbul, Turkey
20:00 TRT (UTC+3)
		Boxscore		Arena: Sinan Erdem Dome

== Statistics ==
Legend
GP	Games played	GS	Games started	MPG	Minutes per game
FG%	Field-goal percentage	3FG%	3-point field-goal percentage	FT%	Free-throw percentage
RPG	Rebounds per game	APG	Assists per game	SPG	Steals per game
BPG	Blocks per game	PPG	Points per game	PIR	PIR per game

Player	Left during season

=== Head coaches records ===
As of 22 November 2026

Head Coach	Competition	G	W	D	L	PF	PA	PD	Win %
Gianmarco Pozzecco	Basketbol Süper Ligi	3	1	0	2	261	250	+11	.333
Gianmarco Pozzecco	Basketball Champions League	1	0	0	1	76	96	-20	.000
Manuchar Markoishvili	Basketbol Süper Ligi	6	4	0	2	521	452	+69	.667
Manuchar Markoishvili	Basketball Champions League	3	2	0	1	243	237	+6	.667
Manuchar Markoishvili	Total	13	7	0	6	1101	1035	+66	.538

== See also ==
- Commons:Category:2026–27 Galatasaray Basketball season
