= 2016–17 Basketbol Süper Ligi =

Basketball league in Turkey

Basketbol Süper Ligi
- Season: 2016–17
- Duration: October 8, 2016 – TBD
- Games played: 240 (Regular season)
- Teams: 16
- TV partner(s): beIN Sports; NTV Spor; TBFTV.org

Regular season
- Top seed: Fenerbahçe
- Relegated: TED Ankara Kolejliler; Best Balıkesir

Finals
- Champions: Fenerbahçe (8th title)
- Runners-up: Beşiktaş Sompo Japan
- Finals MVP: (Serbia) Bogdan Bogdanović

Statistical leaders
Points	(United States) Ricky Ledo	21.1
Rebounds	(Serbia) Vladimir Štimac	10.0
Assists	(North Macedonia) Jordan Theodore	7.1
- All statistics correct as of 15 April 2017.

The 2016–17 Basketbol Süper Ligi (BSL) was the 51st season of the top-tier professional basketball league in Turkey. The season started on October 8, 2016. Fenerbahçe won their eighth national championship this season.

== Teams ==
=== Promotion and relegation ===
Türk Telekom and Torku Konyaspor were relegated after finishing in the 15th and 16th places last season. Best Balıkesir was promoted as the runner-up, and Tofaş was promoted as the champions of the 2015–16 TBL season.

=== Locations and stadia ===
Istanbul teams
Locations of the 2016–17 Turkish Basketball Super League Clubs

Club	Location	Arena	Capacity
Anadolu Efes	Istanbul	Sinan Erdem Dome	16,000
Banvit	Bandırma	Kara Ali Acar Sport Hall	3,000
Best Balıkesir ◆	Balıkesir	Kurtdereli Sports Hall	3,500
Beşiktaş Sompo Japan	Istanbul	BJK Akatlar Arena	3,200
Darüşşafaka Doğuş	Istanbul	Volkswagen Arena Istanbul	5,000
Demir İnşaat Büyükçekmece	Istanbul	Gazanfer Bilge Spor Salonu	3,000
Fenerbahçe ●	Istanbul	Ülker Sports Arena	13,800
Galatasaray Odeabank	Istanbul	Sinan Erdem Dome	16,000
Gaziantep Basketbol	Gaziantep	Karataş Şahinbey Sport Hall	6,400
İstanbul BB	Istanbul	Cebeci Sport Hall	1,250
Muratbey Uşak Sportif	Uşak	Uşak Üniversitesi Sport Hall	2,000
Pınar Karşıyaka	İzmir	Karşıyaka Arena	5,000
TED Ankara Kolejliler	Ankara	Ankara Arena	10,400
Tofaş	Bursa	Tofaş Nilüfer Sports Hall	7,500
Trabzonspor Medical Park	Trabzon	Hayri Gür Arena	7,500
Yeşilgiresun Belediye	Giresun	19 Eylül Sports Hall	3,000

Notes

◆ Team makes its debut in the BSL.
● The defending champions, winners of the 2015–16 BSL season.

== Regular season ==
=== League table ===
Pos	Team	Pld	W	L	PF	PA	PD	Pts	Qualification or relegation
1	Fenerbahçe	30	28	2	2546	2182	+364	58	Advance to Playoffs
2	Beşiktaş Sompo Japan	30	24	6	2487	2197	+290	54	Advance to Playoffs
3	Anadolu Efes	30	23	7	2560	2269	+291	53	Advance to Playoffs
4	Darüşşafaka Doğuş	30	23	7	2504	2249	+255	53	Advance to Playoffs
5	Banvit	30	21	9	2504	2319	+185	51	Advance to Playoffs
6	Galatasaray Odeabank	30	18	12	2373	2287	+86	48	Advance to Playoffs
7	Gaziantep Basketbol	30	16	14	2428	2338	+90	46	Advance to Playoffs
8	Tofaş	30	15	15	2465	2426	+39	45	Advance to Playoffs
9	Pınar Karşıyaka	30	15	15	2405	2426	−21	45	
10	İstanbul BB	30	11	19	2304	2481	−177	41	
11	Yeşilgiresun Belediye	30	10	20	2383	2476	−93	40	
12	Trabzonspor Medical Park	30	10	20	2396	2519	−123	40	
13	Demir İnşaat Büyükçekmece	30	9	21	2322	2503	−181	39	
14	Muratbey Uşak Sportif	30	8	22	2430	2605	−175	38	
15	Best Balıkesir (R)	30	7	23	2347	2540	−193	37	Relegation to TBL
16	TED Ankara Kolejliler (R)	30	2	28	2117	2754	−637	32	Relegation to TBL

Updated to match(es) played on 16 May 2017. Source: TBL
(R) Relegated

=== Results ===
Home \ Away	AEF	BAN	BAL	BJK	DAÇ	BÇK	FEN	GAL	GAZ	İBB	UŞK	KSK	TED	TOF	TSB	YGR
Anadolu Efes		83–74	95–67	90–91	78–72	98–74	57–96	80–77	84–96	106–67	86–73	96–70	109–60	81–58	100–77	82–75
Banvit	69–68		79–73	69–80	93–88	79–76	75–86	79–64	83–77	79–64	82–72	104–109	97–71	84–82	89–58	91–71
Best Balıkesir	77–94	98–102		75–91	85–86	77–80	68–79	72–78	78–71	77–84	75–78	101–99	86–73	81–86	69–76	81–76
Beşiktaş Sompo Japan	83–93	85–69	84–75		77–75	87–81	76–79	90–84	67–60	86–73	87–65	86–81	93–52	76–63	92–62	77–59
Darüşşafaka Doğuş	88–85	70–76	95–72	71–68		97–75	78–79	78–69	81–56	82–50	78–70	87–74	71–62	83–75	82–79	87–77
Demir İnşaat Büyükçekmece	52–79	65–89	92–100	67–84	93–107		60–80	71–90	73–68	99–79	103–87	72–68	85–67	70–93	97–69	83–77
Fenerbahçe	81–75	76–71	91–57	93–76	79–76	89–68		92–74	97–92	76–62	98–89	84–75	89–76	90–75	98–78	76–65
Galatasaray Odebank	69–70	74–83	81–72	84–78	72–87	86–79	75–79		66–79	74–67	83–73	67–55	104–57	82–73	90–84	80–74
Gaziantep Basketbol	70–75	69–60	88–80	59–67	85–89	78–67	98–102	72–79		62–61	111–91	73–75	93–69	95–82	96–75	78–71
İstanbul BB	67–95	100–95	80–75	73–84	93–94	86–79	69–76	71–61	76–92		87–85	79–72	100–81	79–80	96–78	89–83
Muratbey Uşak Sportif	78–80	86–103	88–80	66–90	65–90	76–71	71–70	88–95	82–87	80–68		86–71	103–64	74–98	92–101	79–86
Pınar Karşıyaka	100–96	67–85	80–69	82–77	90–95	84–78	73–85	78–72	79–92	92–65	85–75		84–80	82–88	74–59	80–58
TED Ankara Kolejliler	72–74	76–99	69–82	51–93	57–88	73–96	55–101	67–92	79–89	75–96	90–84	78–84		75–85	75–87	90–78
Tofaş	83–89	88–83	91–72	94–95	83–66	73–69	81–72	80–82	72–87	86–81	82–69	80–86	104–77		79–89	92–87
Trabzonspor MP	77–78	66–75	76–84	90–91	71–83	83–75	76–81	73–80	86–70	95–75	101–105	78–74	101–69	86–80		85–89
Yeşilgiresun Belediye	76–84	77–88	98–89	62–82	61–80	100–72	61–72	86–89	92–85	82–67	109–100	81–82	107–77	84–79	81–80	

Source: TBL Fixtures
Legend: Blue = home team win; Red = away team win.

== Playoffs ==
Quarterfinals
1	Fenerbahçe	2
8	Tofaş	0
4	Darüşşafaka Doğuş	2
5	Banvit	0
2	Beşiktaş Sompo Japan	2
7	Gaziantep Basketbol	0
3	Anadolu Efes	2
6	Galatasaray Odeabank	1

Semifinals
1	Fenerbahçe	3
4	Darüşşafaka Doğuş	0
2	Beşiktaş Sompo Japan	3
3	Anadolu Efes	1

Finals
1	Fenerbahçe	4
2	Beşiktaş Sompo Japan	0

== Awards and statistics ==
=== Statistical leaders ===
Category	Player	Club	Average
Points	(United States) Ricky Ledo	Yeşilgiresun Belediye	21.18
Rebounds	(Serbia) Vladimir Štimac	Beşiktaş Sompo Japan	9.58
Assists	(North Macedonia) Jordan Theodore	Banvit	7.23
Blocks	(United States) Bryant Dunston	Anadolu Efes	1.71

== Turkish clubs in European competitions ==
Team	Competition	Progress
Fenerbahçe	EuroLeague	Champions
Anadolu Efes	EuroLeague	Quarter-Finals
Darüşşafaka	EuroLeague	Quarter-Finals
Galatasaray	EuroLeague	12th
Banvit	Champions League	Runners-up
Pınar Karşıyaka	Champions League	Quarter-Finals
Beşiktaş Sompo Japan	Champions League	Last 16
Muratbey Uşak Sportif	FIBA Europe Cup	Quarter-Finals
Royal Halı Gaziantep	FIBA Europe Cup	Last 16
Demir İnşaat Büyükçekmece	FIBA Europe Cup	Last 16
