= 2017–18 Basketbol Süper Ligi =

Basketball league in Turkey

Basketbol Süper Ligi
- Season: 2017–18
- Teams: 16
- TV partners: beIN Sports; NTV Spor; TBFTV.org

Regular season
- Relegated: Yeşilgiresun Belediye; Muratbey Uşak Sportif

Finals
- Champions: Fenerbahçe (9th title)
- Runners-up: Tofaş
- Semifinalists: Anadolu Efes; Banvit
- Finals MVP: Brad Wanamaker (Fenerbahçe)

Statistical leaders
Points	(United States) Erving Walker	18.5
Rebounds	(Serbia) Vladimir Štimac	8.6
Assists	(Lithuania) Šarūnas Vasiliauskas	6.3

The 2017–18 Basketbol Süper Ligi (BSL), for sponsorship reasons named Tahincioğlu Basketbol Süper Ligi, was the 52nd season of the top-tier professional basketball league in Turkey. Fenerbahçe won their 9th Basketbol Süper Ligi title and their 12th Turkish title overall by defeating Tofaş 4–1 in the finals.

== Teams ==
=== Promotion and relegation ===
Best Balıkesir and TED Ankara Kolejliler were relegated after finishing in the 15th and 16th places last season. Eskişehir Basket was promoted as the runner-up, and Sakarya BB was promoted as the champions of the 2016–17 TBL season.

=== Locations and stadia ===
Locations of the 2016–17 Turkish Basketball Super League Clubs
Istanbul Basketbol Süper Ligi clubs

Team	Home city	Stadium	Capacity
Anadolu Efes	Istanbul	Sinan Erdem Dome	16,000
Banvit	Bandırma	Kara Ali Acar Sport Hall	3,000
Beşiktaş Sompo Japan	Istanbul	BJK Akatlar Arena	3,200
Darüşşafaka	Istanbul	Volkswagen Arena Istanbul	5,000
Demir İnşaat Büyükçekmece	Istanbul	Gazanfer Bilge Spor Salonu	3,000
Eskişehir Basket	Eskişehir	Anadolu Üniversitesi Sport Hall	5,000
Fenerbahçe Doğuş	Istanbul	Ülker Sports Arena	13,800
Galatasaray Odeabank	Istanbul	Sinan Erdem Dome	16,000
Gaziantep Basketbol	Gaziantep	Karataş Şahinbey Sport Hall	6,400
İstanbul BB	Istanbul	Cebeci Sport Hall	1,250
Muratbey Uşak Sportif	Uşak	Uşak Üniversitesi Sport Hall	2,000
Pınar Karşıyaka	İzmir	Karşıyaka Arena	5,000
Sakarya BB	Sakarya	Sakarya Sports Hall	5,000
Tofaş	Bursa	Tofaş Nilüfer Sports Hall	7,500
Trabzonspor Medical Park	Trabzon	Hayri Gür Arena	7,500
Yeşilgiresun Belediye	Giresun	19 Eylül Sports Hall	3,000

== Regular season ==
In the regular season, teams play against each other four times home-and-away in a round-robin format. The eight first qualified teams advance to the playoffs. The last two teams in the table are relegated to the second tier TBL. The regular season started on 7 October 2017.

=== League table ===
Pos	Team	Pld	W	L	PF	PA	PD	Pts	Qualification or relegation
1	Fenerbahçe Doğuş	30	27	3	2618	2179	+439	57	Advance to playoffs
2	Tofaş	30	24	6	2538	2328	+210	54	Advance to playoffs
3	Anadolu Efes (Note: Anadolu Efes was conducted one point after the team left the court unauthorized during the semi-finals of the playoffs in the 2016–17 season.)	30	22	8	2501	2397	+104	51	Advance to playoffs
4	Beşiktaş Sompo Japan	30	20	10	2288	2170	+118	50	Advance to playoffs
5	Banvit	30	18	12	2371	2278	+93	48	Advance to playoffs
6	Darüşşafaka	30	18	12	2399	2219	+180	48	Advance to playoffs
7	Eskişehir	30	16	14	2401	2414	−13	46	Advance to playoffs
8	Sakarya BB	30	14	16	2305	2348	−43	44	Advance to playoffs
9	Galatasaray Odeabank	30	13	17	2430	2407	+23	43	
10	Pınar Karşıyaka	30	12	18	2334	2494	−160	42	
11	İstanbul BB	30	11	19	2347	2472	−125	41	
12	Demir İnşaat Büyükçekmece	30	10	20	2374	2461	−87	40	
13	Trabzonspor Medical Park	30	10	20	2568	2755	−187	40	
14	Gaziantep	30	10	20	2354	2506	−152	40	
15	Yeşilgiresun Belediye (R)	30	9	21	2391	2607	−216	39	Relegation to TBL
16	Muratbey Uşak Sportif (R)	30	6	24	2280	2464	−184	36	Relegation to TBL

Source: Basketbol Süper Ligi
(R) Relegated

=== Results ===
Home \ Away	EFE	BAN	BES	DAR	BÜY	ESK	FEN	GAL	GAZ	IBB	USA	KAR	SAK	TOF	TRA	YES
Anadolu Efes	—	77–99	78–69	73–69	94–75	89–77	84–80	76–68	94–87	86–67	97–84	89–77	83–68	87–79	98–91	97–93
Banvit	82–90	—	83–87	68–64	84–89	55–58	63–61	80–90	86–76	69–72	71–58	84–65	75–66	64–70	75–72	104–80
Beşiktaş Sompo Japan	67–64	79–64	—	88–84	78–65	87–69	71–76	80–78	87–80	94–83	77–70	77–63	58–71	59–60	78–74	91–94
Darüşşafaka	79–67	85–88	74–67	—	75–57	90–83	84–78	69–67	77–83	79–77	89–76	78–63	76–61	54–58	88–73	80–73
Demir İnşaat Büyükçekmece	63–77	82–84	59–72	77–75	—	72–79	80–88	77–86	98–78	107–78	78–84	77–70	71–64	76–93	81–76	101–58
Eskişehir	84–86	80–81	78–87	89–82	76–72	—	66–85	70–64	84–85	80–76	85–84	66–72	102–96	76–75	90–72	86–75
Fenerbahçe Doğuş	100–74	80–63	83–60	76–69	82–59	79–69	—	80–60	96–71	96–73	89–72	97–71	89–75	98–78	112–83	85–72
Galatasaray Odeabank	85–91	72–91	77–73	77–89	98–71	84–78	62–83	—	82–58	99–77	87–81	98–82	75–77	83–90	84–78	106–84
Gaziantep Basketbol	66–74	82–63	62–69	65–98	87–67	118–119	90–95	66–77	—	85–72	68–65	74–73	79–67	69–87	84–95	79–78
İstanbul BB	84–58	65–72	56–69	75–72	82–70	85–71	70–83	74–67	92–86	—	77–73	77–81	58–69	73–80	92–100	99–87
Muratbey Uşak Sportif	78–81	71–89	65–75	84–80	71–104	68–81	81–90	85–78	67–75	79–83	—	86–92	69–81	73–86	100–71	85–82
Pınar Karşıyaka	92–85	69–89	79–71	71–93	103–98	70–74	69–74	75–91	74–67	84–76	78–74	—	88–80	80–84	79–78	77–71
Sakarya BB	74–100	81–76	69–75	55–66	77–67	100–89	79–83	75–73	79–57	86–95	83–73	90–78	—	74–86	87–82	77–66
Tofaş	80–69	93–104	83–79	97–81	92–88	73–69	71–88	97–90	109–107	89–85	97–72	94–75	84–79	—	103–63	92–52
Trabzonspor Medical Park	89–96	88–84	71–82	82–104	105–113	73–86	90–119	103–82	91–86	111–93	76–91	108–105	96–79	91–83	—	100–95
Yeşilgiresun Belediye	91–87	76–81	58–82	71–96	95–80	79–87	70–93	97–90	91–84	90–81	64–61	94–79	79–86	70–75	106–86	—

Updated to match(es) played on 2 May 2018. Source: Basketbol Süper Ligi
Legend: Blue = home team win; Red = away team win.

== Playoffs ==
Quarterfinals
1	Fenerbahçe Doğuş	2
8	Sakarya BB	0
4	Beşiktaş Sompo Japan	0
5	Banvit	2
2	Tofaş	2
7	Eskişehir	0
3	Anadolu Efes	2
6	Darüşşafaka	0

Semifinals
1	Fenerbahçe Doğuş	3
5	Banvit	0
2	Tofaş	3
3	Anadolu Efes	1

Finals
1	Fenerbahçe Doğuş	4
2	Tofaş	1

== Awards and statistics ==
=== Statistical leaders ===
Category	Player	Club	Average
Points	(United States) Erving Walker	Demir İnşaat Büyükçekmece	18.52
Rebounds	(Serbia) Vladimir Štimac	Anadolu Efes	8.55
Assists	(Lithuania) Šarūnas Vasiliauskas	Trabzonspor	6.27
Blocks	(Nigeria) Chris Obekpa	Trabzonspor	2.46
Three-point field goals	(United States) Erving Walker	Demir İnşaat Büyükçekmece	3.10

== Turkish clubs in European competitions ==
Team	Competition	Progress	Ref
Fenerbahçe	EuroLeague	Runners-up	
Anadolu Efes	EuroLeague	Regular season	
Darüşşafaka	EuroCup	Champions	
Galatasaray	EuroCup	Top 16	
Tofaş	EuroCup	Regular season	
Beşiktaş Sompo Japan	Champions League	Round of 16	
Banvit	Champions League	Quarter-finals	
Royal Halı Gaziantep	Champions League	Regular season	
Pınar Karşıyaka	Champions League	Quarter-finals	
İstanbul BB	FIBA Europe Cup	Second round	
Trabzonspor Medical Park	FIBA Europe Cup	First qualifying round	
Demir İnşaat Büyükçekmece	FIBA Europe Cup	Second round	
