= Beşiktaş–Fenerbahçe rivalry =

Beşiktaş–Fenerbahçe rivalry may refer to:

- Beşiktaş–Fenerbahçe rivalry (basketball)
- Beşiktaş–Fenerbahçe rivalry (football)
