= 2026–27 Basketbol Süper Ligi =

Basketball league in Turkey

Basketbol Süper Ligi
- Season: 2026–27
- Dates: 26 September 2026 – June 2027
- Games played: 240 + Playoffs
- Teams: 16
- TV partner: beIN Sports

Records
- Biggest home win: Bahçeşehir Koleji 114–78 Körfez Basket (21 November 2026)
- Biggest away win: Esenler Erokspor 57–93 Bahçeşehir Koleji (15 November 2026)
- Highest scoring: Denizli Basket 101–98 Çayırova (15 November 2026)
- Winning streak: 5 games Bahçeşehir Koleji
- Losing streak: 6 games Bursaspor Basketbol

The 2026–27 Basketbol Süper Ligi is the 61st season of the Basketball Super League (Turkish: Basketbol Süper Ligi), the top-level professional club men's basketball league in Turkey.

Fenerbahçe Tarfin are three-times defending champions.

== Teams ==
=== Venues ===
,
Locations of the 2026–27 Basketbol Süper Ligi clubs
Istanbul Basketbol Süper Ligi clubs

Team	Location	Stadium	Capacity
Anadolu Efes	Istanbul (Zeytinburnu)	Basketbol Gelişim Merkezi	10,000
Bahçeşehir Koleji	Istanbul (Bakırköy)	Sinan Erdem Spor Salonu	16,000
Beşiktaş Fuzul	Istanbul (Beşiktaş)	Akatlar Arena	3,200
Biotekno Körfez Basket	Kocaeli	Şehit Polis Recep Topaloğlu Sports Hall	5,000
Bursaspor Basketbol	Bursa	Tofaş Nilüfer Sports Hall	7,500
Esenler Erokspor	Istanbul (Esenler)	Sinan Erdem Spor Salonu	16,000
Fenerbahçe Tarfin	Istanbul (Ataşehir)	Ülker Sports Arena	13,800
Galatasaray MCT Technic	Istanbul (Bakırköy)	Sinan Erdem Spor Salonu	16,000
Glint Çayırova Belediyesi	Kocaeli (Çayırova)	Çayırova Spor Salonu	1,000
Karşıyaka Basket	İzmir (Karşıyaka)	Karşıyaka Arena	5,000
Petkim Spor	İzmir (Aliağa)	Aliağa Belediyesi ENKA Spor Salonu	3,000
Pizzabulls Bandırma Bordo	Balıkesir (Bandırma)	Bandırma 17 Eylül Üniversitesi Spor Salonu	2,000
Tofaş	Bursa	Tofaş Nilüfer Sports Hall	7,500
Trabzonspor	Trabzon	Hayri Gür Arena	7,500
Türk Telekom	Ankara	Ankara Arena	10,400
Yukatel Denizli Basket	Denizli	Pamukkale University Arena	3,490

=== Personnel and sponsorship ===
Team	Head coach	Captain	Kit manufacturer	Main shirt sponsor
Anadolu Efes	(Spain) Pablo Laso	(Turkey) Erkan Yılmaz	GSA	Corendon
Bahçeşehir Koleji	(Serbia) Aleksandar Đorđević	(United States) Tyler Cavanaugh	Adidas	N/A
Beşiktaş Fuzul	(Serbia) Dušan Alimpijević	(Canada) Conor Morgan	Umbro	N/A
Biotekno Körfez Basket	(Turkey) Serhan Kavut	(United States) Matt Mitchell	Puma	Biotekno
Bursaspor Basketbol	(Spain) Roger Grimau	(United States) Brandon Taylor	Upon	N/A
Esenler Erokspor	(Turkey) Ufuk Sarıca	(Turkey) Yunus Emre Sonsırma	Puma	N/A
Fenerbahçe Tarfin	(Lithuania) Šarūnas Jasikevičius	(Turkey) Melih Mahmutoğlu	Adidas	Tarfin
Galatasaray MCT Technic	(Georgia (country)) Manuchar Markoishvili	(Turkey) Buğrahan Tuncer	Puma	MCT Technic
Glint Çayırova Belediyesi	(Turkey) Ender Arslan	(Turkey) Berkay Candan	Kappa	Glint
Karşıyaka Basket	(Bosnia and Herzegovina) Nenad Marković	(Turkey) Yavuz Gültekin	Hummel	Folkart
Petkim Spor	(Turkey) Orhun Ene	(Belgium) Thomas Akyazılı	Playoff	Star Rafineri
Pizzabulls Bandırma Bordo	(Turkey) Tutku Açık	(Turkey) Okben Ulubay	Head	Pizzabulls
Tofaş	(Italy) Massimo Cancellieri	(Turkey) Yiğitcan Saybir	Head	Spoticar
Trabzonspor	(Turkey) Hakan Demir	(Turkey) Tolga Geçim	New Balance	N/A
Türk Telekom	(Turkey) Erdem Can	(Turkey) Doğuş Özdemiroğlu	Sportive	N/A
Yukatel Denizli Basket	(Turkey) Zafer Aktaş	(Germany) Mahir Agva	Geges	Yukatel

=== Head coaching changes ===
Team	Outgoing manager	Manner of departure	Date of vacancy	Position in table	Replaced with	Date of appointment
Tofaş	(Turkey) Murat Hüseyin Yılmaz	Mutual consent	15 May 2026	Pre-season	(Italy) Massimo Cancellieri	27 May 2026
Bahçeşehir Koleji	(Serbia) Marko Barać	Mutual consent	12 June 2026	Pre-season	(Serbia) Aleksandar Đorđević	12 June 2026
Karşıyaka Basket	(Turkey) Ahmet Kandemir	Mutual consent	1 July 2026	Pre-season	(Bosnia and Herzegovina) Nenad Marković	29 July 2026
Galatasaray MCT Technic	(Italy) Gianmarco Pozzecco	Mutual consent	16 October 2026	8th (1–2)	(Georgia (country)) Manuchar Markoishvili	16 October 2026
Trabzonspor	(Turkey) Selçuk Ernak	Mutual consent	10 November 2026	4th (4–3)	(Turkey) Hakan Demir	17 November 2026

== Regular season ==
=== League table ===
Pos	Team	Pld	W	L	PF	PA	PD	Pts	Qualification or relegation
1	Bahçeşehir Koleji	9	8	1	856	741	+115	17	Advance to playoffs
2	Türk Telekom	9	7	2	764	678	+86	16	Advance to playoffs
3	Anadolu Efes	9	6	3	754	703	+51	15	Advance to playoffs
4	Fenerbahçe Tarfin	9	6	3	773	724	+49	15	Advance to playoffs
5	Galatasaray MCT Technic	9	5	4	782	702	+80	14	Advance to playoffs
6	Beşiktaş Fuzul	9	5	4	757	763	−6	14	Advance to playoffs
7	Petkim Spor	9	5	4	738	750	−12	14	Advance to playoffs
8	Karşıyaka Basket	9	5	4	726	740	−14	14	Advance to playoffs
9	Pizzabulls Bandırma Bordo	9	4	5	748	769	−21	13	
10	Trabzonspor	9	4	5	712	735	−23	13	
11	Tofaş	9	4	5	722	751	−29	13	
12	Esenler Erokspor	9	4	5	715	771	−56	13	
13	Glint Çayırova Belediyesi	9	3	6	756	795	−39	12	
14	Biotekno Körfez Basket	9	3	6	734	796	−62	12	
15	Yukatel Denizli Basket	9	2	7	744	793	−49	11	Relegation to TBL
16	Bursaspor Basketbol	9	1	8	680	750	−70	10	Relegation to TBL

Updated to match(es) played on 22 November 2026. Source: Basketbol Süper Ligi

=== Positions by round ===
Team ╲ Round	1	2	3	4	5	6	7	8	9	10	11	12	13	14	15	16	17	18	19	20	21	22	23	24	25	26	27	28	29	30
Bahçeşehir Koleji	2	1	2	1	1	3	2	1	1																					
Türk Telekom	8	3	1	3	2	1	1	2	2																					
Anadolu Efes	3	2	3	2	3	2	4	4	3																					
Fenerbahçe Tarfin	15	13	6	9	5	4	3	3	4																					
Galatasaray MCT Technic	1	4	8	12	8	7	5	6	5																					
Beşiktaş Fuzul	14	11	14	11	12	10	10	7	6																					
Petkim Spor	6	10	11	8	7	8	6	5	7																					
Karşıyaka Basket	10	7	10	6	10	9	8	10	8																					
Pizzabulls Bandırma Bordo	9	14	15	13	14	12	13	12	9																					
Trabzonspor	5	9	7	5	6	5	7	9	10																					
Tofaş	7	12	13	10	11	13	11	8	11																					
Esenler Erokspor	13	8	5	4	4	6	9	11	12																					
Glint Çayırova Belediyesi	16	16	16	16	16	16	14	14	13																					
Biotekno Körfez Basket	4	6	4	7	9	11	12	13	14																					
Yukatel Denizli Basket	11	5	9	14	13	14	15	15	15																					
Bursaspor	12	15	12	15	15	15	16	16	16																					

Leader
Advance to the playoffs
Relegated

Updated to match(es) played on November 22, 2026. Source: Basketbol Süper Ligi

=== Results ===
Home \ Away	AEF	BAH	BJK	KOR	BUR	ERO	FEN	GAL	CAY	KSK	PET	BOR	TOF	TRA	TTA	MEB
Anadolu Efes	—		95–81	93–77									87–93			85–76
Bahçeşehir Koleji		—	100–96	114–78			98–83			92–82						97–86
Beşiktaş Fuzul			—		76–71		92–88	83–80	93–76					90–81		
Biotekno Körfez Basket				—		88–79		82–81					69–71	83–89		
Bursaspor		80–90			—		59–78			83–86		85–89			69–78	
Esenler Erokspor	73–70	57–93				—					96–87				71–89	
Fenerbahçe Tarfin	77–75			85–84			—						88–77			
Galatasaray MCT Technic					88–93	90–81		—	102–79			102–68				
Glint Çayırova Belediyesi		76–84			83–64		85–100		—			95–78				
Karşıyaka Basket			84–83				72–97	78–71	95–79	—						82–79
Petkim Spor	77–87			90–91							—				88–84	85–81
Pizzabulls Bandırma Bordo	79–85	103–88								83–75		—			79–66	
Tofaş						79–87					72–74	90–89	—	75–61		
Trabzonspor					82–76	90–93					81–91	83–80		—		
Türk Telekom			88–63	94–82						73–72			95–78		—	97–76
Yukatel Denizli Basket								74–87	101–98				101–87			—

Updated to match(es) played on November 22, 2026. Source: Basketbol Süper Ligi
Legend: Blue = home team win; Red = away team win.
Matches with lighter background shading were decided after overtime.

== Statistical leaders ==
=== Efficiency ===
Pos	Player	Club	PIR
1	(United States) Trevion Williams	Bahçeşehir Koleji	21.67
2	(United States) Jordon Crawford	Glint Çayırova Belediyesi	20.78
3	(Australia) Oscar Cluff	Biotekno Körfez Basket	20.71
4	(United States) Brandon Taylor	Bursaspor Basketbol	20.67
5	(United States) John Meeks	Yukatel Denizli Basket	19.33

=== Points ===
Pos	Player	Club	PPG
1	(United States) Q. J. Peterson	Pizzabulls Bandırma Bordo	23.22
2	(United States) Ishmael El-Amin	Karşıyaka Basket	20.33
3	(United States) Jordon Crawford	Glint Çayırova Belediyesi	20.00
4	(United States) John Meeks	Yukatel Denizli Basket	19.44
5	(United States) Javon Freeman-Liberty	Bursaspor Basketbol	18.83

=== Rebounds ===
Pos	Player	Club	RPG
1	(United States) Trevion Williams	Bahçeşehir Koleji	10.78
2	(Australia) Oscar Cluff	Biotekno Körfez Basket	9.00
3	(Germany) Mahir Agva	Yukatel Denizli Basket	7.89
4	(United States) Fabian White Jr.	Glint Çayırova Belediyesi	7.56
5	(United States) Zach Hankins	Pizzabulls Bandırma Bordo	6.89

=== Assists ===
Pos	Player	Club	APG
1	(United States) Brandon Taylor	Bursaspor Basketbol	8.33
2	(United States) Jordon Crawford	Glint Çayırova Belediyesi	7.78
3	(United States) Bryce Jones	Tofaş	5.56
4	(United States) Marcus Keene	Trabzonspor	5.56
5	(United States) Brae Ivey	Yukatel Denizli Basket	5.33

Updated to match(es) played on November 22, 2026
Source: Basketbol Süper Ligi

== Awards ==
All official awards of the 2026–27 Basketbol Süper Ligi.

=== MVP of the Month ===
Month	Player	Team	EFF	Ref.
2026
October	(Australia) Oscar Cluff	Biotekno Körfez Basket	21.6	

=== MVP of the Round ===
Gameday	Player	Team	EFF	Ref.
1	(United States) Johnny Davis	Biotekno Körfez Basket	39	
2	(United States) Trevion Williams	Bahçeşehir Koleji	35	
3	(Australia) Oscar Cluff	Biotekno Körfez Basket	31	
4	(United States) Bryce Jones	Tofaş	31	
5	(United States) Fabian White Jr.	Glint Çayırova Belediyesi	31	
6	(Serbia) Uroš Trifunović	Türk Telekom	34	
7	(United States) Trevion Williams (x2)	Bahçeşehir Koleji	31	
8	(Germany) Mahir Agva	Yukatel Denizli Basket	27	

=== Starting Five of the Round ===
Round	PG	SG	SF	PF	C	Ref.
1	(United States) Bryce Jones (Tofaş)	(United States) Khyri Thomas (Petkim Spor)	(United States) Johnny Davis (Biotekno Körfez Basket)	(Serbia) Alen Smailagić (Galatasaray MCT Technic)	(United States) Trevion Williams (Bahçeşehir Koleji)	
2	(United States) Johnny Juzang (Fenerbahçe Tarfin)	(United States) Brae Ivey (Yukatel Denizli Basket)	(United States) Mike Davis Jr. (Esenler Erokspor)	(United States) Trevion Williams (Bahçeşehir Koleji)	(The Bahamas) Kai Jones (Anadolu Efes)	
3	(Turkey) Malachi Flynn (Bahçeşehir Koleji)	(United States) Brandon Taylor (Bursaspor Basketbol)	(Turkey) Yiğit Arslan (Trabzonspor)	(Croatia) Dario Šarić (Anadolu Efes)	(Australia) Oscar Cluff (Biotekno Körfez Basket)	
4	(United States) Bryce Jones (Tofaş)	(United States) Max Abmas (Petkim Spor)	(United States) Quentin Peterson (Pizza Bulls Bordo Bandırma)	(United States) Trevion Williams (Bahçeşehir Koleji)	(United States) Steven Enoch (Karşıyaka Basket)	
5	(Poland) Mateusz Ponitka (Bahçeşehir Koleji)	(United States) Chris Horton (Petkim Spor)	(United States) Fabian White Jr. (Glint Çayırova Belediyesi)	(United States) James Webb III (Esenler Erokspor)	(Serbia) Alen Smailagić (Galatasaray MCT Technic)	
6	(United States) Ty Gordon (Pizza Bulls Bordo Bandırma)	(United States) Braxton Key (Fenerbahçe Tarfin)	(Serbia) Uroš Trifunović (Türk Telekom)	(Turkey) Metecan Birsen (Beşiktaş)	(United States) Steven Enoch (Karşıyaka Basket)	
7	(United States) Jordon Crawford (Glint Çayırova Belediyesi)	(Canada) Olivier Hanlan (Petkim Spor)	(Nigeria) Chimezie Metu (Galatasaray MCT Technic)	(Belgium) Ismaël Bako (Türk Telekom)	(United States) Trevion Williams (Bahçeşehir Koleji)	
8	(United States) Khyri Thomas (Petkim Spor)	(United States) Johnny Davis (Biotekno Körfez Basket)	(United States) Kris Bankston (Türk Telekom)	(Germany) Mahir Agva (Yukatel Denizli Basket)	(Croatia) Ante Žižić (Beşiktaş)	

== Turkish clubs in European competitions ==
Team	Competition	Progress
Anadolu Efes	EuroLeague	Regular Season
Beşiktaş Fuzul	EuroLeague	Regular Season
Fenerbahçe Tarfin	EuroLeague	Regular Season
Bahçeşehir Koleji	EuroCup	Regular Season
Tofaş	EuroCup	Regular Season
Türk Telekom	EuroCup	Regular Season
Galatasaray MCT Technic	Champions League	Regular Season
Trabzonspor	Champions League	Regular Season
Biotekno Körfez Basket	Champions League	Qualifying rounds
Yukatel Denizli Basket	Champions League	Qualifying rounds
Yukatel Denizli Basket	FIBA Europe Cup	Regular Season
Biotekno Körfez Basket	FIBA Europe Cup	Regular Season
Esenler Erokspor	FIBA Europe Cup	Regular Season
