= Yağızer Uluğ =

Turkish basketball coach

Yağızer Hamdi Uluğ
Beşiktaş
- Position: Head coach

Personal information
- Born: April 28, 1972 (age 54) İzmir, Turkey
- Coaching career: 2004–present

Career history

Coaching
- 2004–2008: Efes Pilsen (assistant)
- 2009–2012: Beşiktaş (assistant)
- 2012–2015: Galatasaray (assistant)
- 2015–2016: Beşiktaş Sompo Japan

Yağızer Hamdi Uluğ (born April 28, 1972 in İzmir, Turkey) is a Turkish professional basketball coach who served as the head coach of Beşiktaş Sompo Japan between 2015 and 2016.
