= Banvit =

Turkish poultry company

- Type: Anonim Şirket
- Traded as: BİST: BANVT
- ISIN: TRABANVT92A9
- Industry: Food and agriculture
- Founded: 1968; 58 years ago
- Headquarters: Bandırma
- Area served: Turkey
- Key people: Ömer Görener (Chairman)
- Products: Poultry
- Revenue: US$745.62 million (2023)
- Operating income: US$11.40 million (2023)
- Net income: US$33.28 million (2023)
- Total assets: US$382.21 million (2023)
- Total equity: US$154 million (2023)
- Parent: BRF S.A.
- Website: banvitas.com

Banvit is a feed and poultry producer based in Bandırma, Turkey.

== Business and activities ==
Starting as a feed producer in 1968, Banvit gradually moved into the production of broiler chickens. Today, Banvit has the country's largest single broiler facility, able to process 16,000 birds per hour and 75 million per year. The company also has a facility in Romania, a poultry product factory in Bandırma, and the Tadpi turkey product facility in İzmir Distribution is managed through sales offices throughout Turkey and a fleet of refrigerated trucks.

In 2017, a majority in Banvit was acquired by Brazilian food processor BRF S.A..

== Sponsorship ==
Banvit sponsored the basketball club Bandırma B.İ.K. for 25 years (1994–2019), as the club was known as Banvit B.K.

== See also ==
- List of companies of Turkey
