= Çayırova, Kocaeli =

Çayırova
- District and municipality
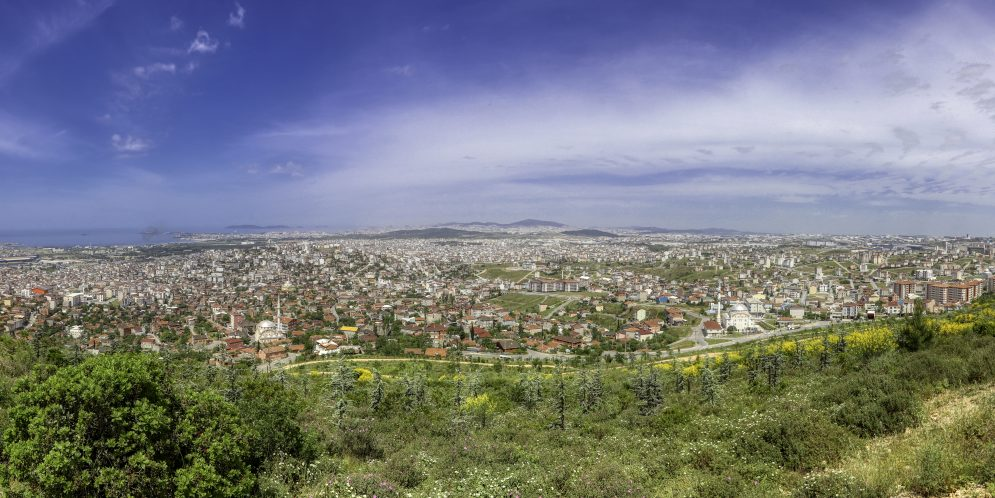
- General view of Çayırova

- Logo

- Map showing Çayırova District in Kocaeli Province

- Location within Turkey Location within Marmara
- Coordinates: 40°48′N 29°25′E
- Country: Turkey
- Province: Kocaeli

Government
  - Mayor: Bünyamin Çi̇ftçi̇ (AK Party)
- Area: 23 km^{2} (8.9 sq mi)
- Population (2022): 150,792
  - Density: 6,600/km^{2} (17,000/sq mi)
- Time zone: UTC+3 (TRT)
- Postal code: 41420
- Area code: 0262
- Website: www.cayirova.bel.tr

Çayırova is a municipality and district of Kocaeli Province, Turkey. Its area is 23 km^{2}, and its population is 150,792 (2022).

The district Çayırova was created in 2008 from part of the district of Gebze, along with the districts Darıca and Dilovası. The mayor is Bünyamin Çi̇ftçi̇ (AK Party).

== Composition ==
There are 9 neighbourhoods in Çayırova District:

- Akse
- Atatürk
- Çayırova
- Cumhuriyet
- Emek
- İnönü
- Özgürlük
- Şekerpınar
- Yenimahalle
