= Beşiktaş–Fenerbahçe rivalry (basketball) =

Basketball rivalry in Turkey

Beşiktaş JK vs Fenerbahçe SK
- Location: Istanbul, Turkey
- Teams: Beşiktaş JK; Fenerbahçe SK
- Latest meeting: Beşiktaş 68–64 Fenerbahçe (02.12.2023)

Statistics
- Total meetings: 163
- Most wins: Fenerbahçe (111)
- All-time series: Beşiktaş: 52; Fenerbahçe: 111
- Largest victory: Fenerbahçe 87–45 Beşiktaş (27.03.1957); Fenerbahçe 65–96 Beşiktaş (08.12.1979)

Beşiktaş–Fenerbahçe rivalry matches

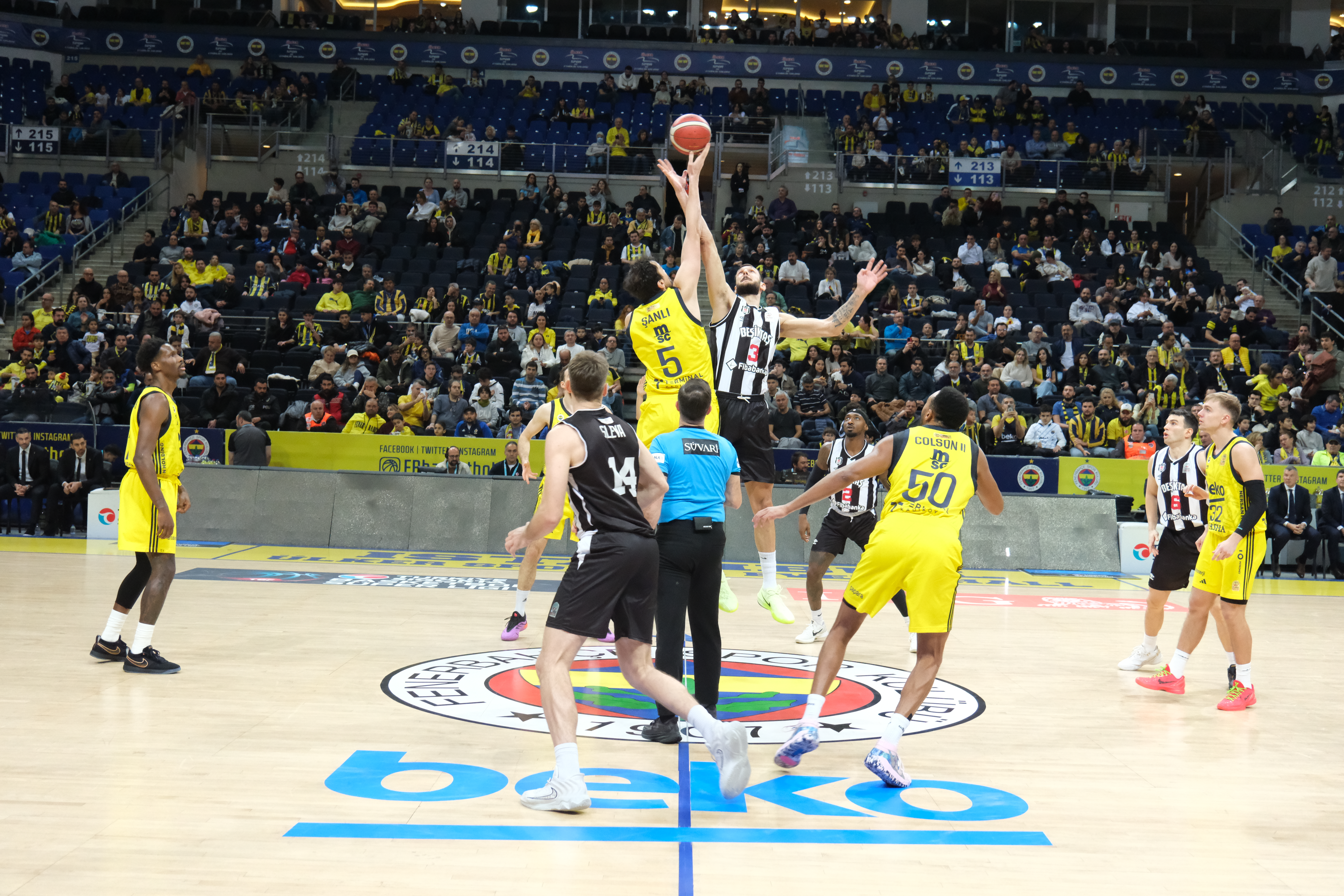
Fenerbahçe - Beşiktaş men's match in Ülker Sports and Event Hall opening tip 12 January 2025

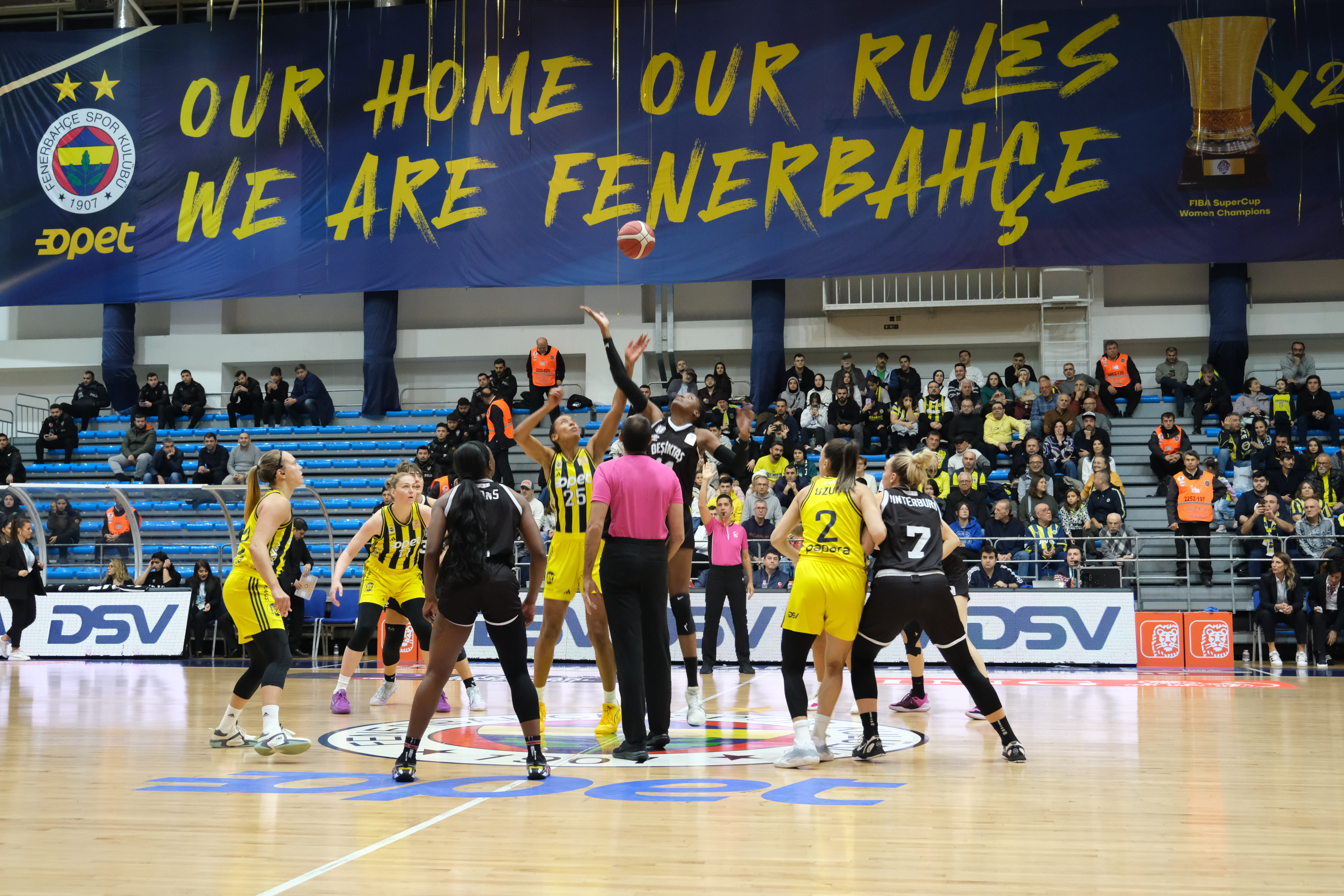
Fenerbahçe - Beşiktaş women's match in Metro Energy Sport Hall opening tip 15 December 2024

The Beşiktaş-Fenerbahçe rivalry are the basketball (men's and women's) matches between Beşiktaş and Fenerbahçe, two clubs representing the city of Istanbul.

Beşiktaş and Fenerbahçe Men's Basketball Teams have played against each other 161 times since 1945. Fenerbahçe won 109 of these matches and Beşiktaş won 52 of these matches. Beşiktaş and Fenerbahçe Women's Basketball Teams have played each other 129 times since 1956, of these matches Fenerbahçe won 97, and Beşiktaş and 32.

Beşiktaş's men's basketball department were founded in 1933, before being halted in 1936, and then resuming once again in 1940. Since then, Beşiktaş have played in the Turkish Basketball Super League, in every season, except in the 1988–89 season, due to their relegation to the Turkish Basketball First League after the 1987–88 season. The club won the Turkish Super League, under the management of Ateş Çubukçu and Tom Davis, in the 1974–75 season.

The men's basketball department of Fenerbahçe were founded in 1913 and achieved considerable success when the sport established itself in Turkey. Fenerbahçe won national championship titles in 1957, 1959 and 1965, just before the Turkish League was founded in 1966, and participated in the European Champions Cup in 1960 and 1966. Their fans had to wait until 1991 for another title, when Levent Topsakal, Larry Richard and head coach Çetin Yılmaz led Fenerbahçe to the Turkish League title over Tofaş.

== Honours ==
Competition	Beşiktaş	Fenerbahçe
Turkish Super League	2	11
Turkish Championship	0	3
Turkish Cup	1	9
Turkish Super Cup	1	7
Istanbul Basketball League	0	7
EuroLeague	0	1
FIBA EuroChallenge	1	0
Total	5	38

== Head to head ==
As of 28 January 2021

	Matches	Wins Beşiktaş	Wins Fenerbahçe
Turkish League	114	42	72
Turkish Cup	9	3	6
FIBA Europe League	3	1	2
EuroLeague	2	1	1
Total matches	128	47	81

== Sponsorship naming ==
Due to sponsorship deals, Fenerbahçe and Beşiktaş have been also known as:

- Fenerbahçe Ülker: 2006–2015
- Fenerbahçe Doğuş: 2017–18
- Fenerbahçe Beko: 2018–
- Beşiktaş Cola Turka: 2005–2011
- Beşiktaş Milangaz: 2011–2012
- Beşiktaş Integral Forex: 2013–2015
- Beşiktaş Sompo Japan: 2015–2020
- Beşiktaş Icrypex: 2021–present

== Turkish League matches ==
Season	Date	Home team	Score	Away team
1967/68	26-11-1967	Fenerbahçe	60–48	Beşiktaş
1967/68	11-05-1968	Beşiktaş	63–67	Fenerbahçe
1968/69	23-10-1968	Beşiktaş	80–63	Fenerbahçe
1968/69	15-03-1969	Fenerbahçe	74–70	Beşiktaş
1969/70	29-11-1969	Fenerbahçe	88–65	Beşiktaş
1969/70	14-02-1970	Beşiktaş	71–65	Fenerbahçe
1970/71	12-12-1970	Fenerbahçe	69–64	Beşiktaş
1970/71	14-02-1971	Beşiktaş	74–65	Fenerbahçe
1971/72	21-11-1971	Beşiktaş	80–78	Fenerbahçe
1971/72	20-02-1972	Fenerbahçe	91–77	Beşiktaş
1972/73	05-11-1972	Fenerbahçe	80–73	Beşiktaş
1972/73	20-01-1973	Beşiktaş	67–62	Fenerbahçe
1973/74	11-11-1973	Fenerbahçe	58–68	Beşiktaş
1973/74	09-02-1974	Beşiktaş	74–63	Fenerbahçe
1974/75	03-11-1974	Fenerbahçe	77–90	Beşiktaş
1974/75	02-03-1975	Beşiktaş	81–77	Fenerbahçe
1975/76	15-11-1975	Fenerbahçe	83–86	Beşiktaş
1975/76	25-01-1976	Beşiktaş	84–63	Fenerbahçe
1976/77	31-10-1976	Beşiktaş	96–79	Fenerbahçe
1976/77	16-01-1977	Fenerbahçe	82–98	Beşiktaş
1977/78	31-12-1977	Beşiktaş	89–80	Fenerbahçe
1977/78	21-01-1978	Fenerbahçe	70–79	Beşiktaş
1978/79	21-10-1978	Beşiktaş	77–54	Fenerbahçe
1978/79	18-02-1979	Fenerbahçe	72–92	Beşiktaş
1979/80	08-12-1979	Beşiktaş	96–65	Fenerbahçe
1979/80	16-02-1980	Fenerbahçe	66–71	Beşiktaş
1982/83	26-09-1982	Fenerbahçe	96–81	Beşiktaş
1982/83	11-12-1982	Beşiktaş	65–82	Fenerbahçe
1982/83	06-02-1983	Beşiktaş	85–86	Fenerbahçe
1982/83	02-03-1983	Beşiktaş	103–91	Fenerbahçe
1982/83	18-03-1983	Fenerbahçe	98–96	Beşiktaş
1983/84	03-12-1983	Beşiktaş	70–66	Fenerbahçe
1983/84	04-02-1984	Fenerbahçe	70–71	Beşiktaş
1984/85	22-12-1984	Beşiktaş	74–78	Fenerbahçe
1984/85	27-01-1985	Fenerbahçe	75–72	Beşiktaş
1985/86	12-10-1985	Fenerbahçe	114–95	Beşiktaş
1985/86	18-02-1986	Beşiktaş	86–89	Fenerbahçe
1986/87	23-12-1986	Beşiktaş	97–86	Fenerbahçe
1986/87	01-03-1987	Fenerbahçe	65–73	Beşiktaş
1987/88	27-11-1987	Beşiktaş	52–86	Fenerbahçe
1987/88	20-02-1988	Fenerbahçe	95–74	Beşiktaş
1989/90	08-10-1989	Fenerbahçe	75–72	Beşiktaş
1989/90	05-01-1990	Beşiktaş	79–88	Fenerbahçe
1990/91	02-11-1990	Fenerbahçe	82–73	Beşiktaş
1990/91	01-02-1991	Beşiktaş	70–82	Fenerbahçe
1991/92	13-12-1991	Beşiktaş	86–94	Fenerbahçe
1991/92	14-03-1992	Fenerbahçe	92–78	Beşiktaş
1992/93	15-10-1992	Beşiktaş	70–75	Fenerbahçe
1992/93	01-02-1993	Fenerbahçe	83–55	Beşiktaş
1992/93	16-04-1993	Fenerbahçe	74–69	Beşiktaş
1992/93	23-04-1993	Beşiktaş	73–79	Fenerbahçe
1993/94	18-12-1993	Beşiktaş	83–86	Fenerbahçe
1993/94	13-04-1994	Fenerbahçe	90–89	Beşiktaş
1994/95	12-10-1994	Beşiktaş	61–74	Fenerbahçe
1994/95	11-02-1995	Fenerbahçe	84–64	Beşiktaş
1995/96	30-12-1995	Fenerbahçe	75–76	Beşiktaş
1995/96	11-04-1996	Beşiktaş	79–100	Fenerbahçe
1996/97	30-11-1996	Beşiktaş	56–75	Fenerbahçe

Season	Date	Home team	Score	Away team
1996/97	29-03-1997	Fenerbahçe	65–82	Beşiktaş
1997/98	15-11-1997	Beşiktaş	82–99	Fenerbahçe
1997/98	04-04-1998	Fenerbahçe	83–70	Beşiktaş
1998/99	06-12-1998	Fenerbahçe	56–45	Beşiktaş
1998/99	21-03-1999	Beşiktaş	68–69	Fenerbahçe
1999/00	13-11-1999	Fenerbahçe	83–84	Beşiktaş
1999/00	19-02-2000	Beşiktaş	91–84	Fenerbahçe
2000/01	14-01-2001	Fenerbahçe	77–73	Beşiktaş
2000/01	14-04-2001	Beşiktaş	79–83	Fenerbahçe
2001/02	22-12-2001	Fenerbahçe	72–73	Beşiktaş
2001/02	01-04-2002	Beşiktaş	91–78	Fenerbahçe
2002/03	20-12-2002	Fenerbahçe	98–88	Beşiktaş
2002/03	02-04-2003	Beşiktaş	82–77	Fenerbahçe
2003/04	15-11-2003	Beşiktaş	101–106	Fenerbahçe
2003/04	22-02-2004	Fenerbahçe	77–84	Beşiktaş
2004/05	20-11-2004	Fenerbahçe	83–79	Beşiktaş
2004/05	09-03-2005	Beşiktaş	74–63	Fenerbahçe
2005/06	28-12-2005	Beşiktaş Cola Turka	73–68	Fenerbahçe
2005/06	16-04-2006	Fenerbahçe	88–73	Beşiktaş Cola Turka
2006/07	13-10-2006	Fenerbahçe Ülker	83–71	Beşiktaş Cola Turka
2006/07	04-02-2007	Beşiktaş Cola Turka	68–82	Fenerbahçe Ülker
2007/08	23-12-2007	Beşiktaş Cola Turka	84–61	Fenerbahçe Ülker
2007/08	06-04-2008	Fenerbahçe Ülker	75–68	Beşiktaş Cola Turka
2008/09	16-11-2008	Fenerbahçe Ülker	74–57	Beşiktaş Cola Turka
2008/09	01-03-2009	Beşiktaş Cola Turka	110–95	Fenerbahçe Ülker
2009/10	27-12-2009	Fenerbahçe Ülker	100–92	Beşiktaş Cola Turka
2009/10	11-04-2010	Beşiktaş Cola Turka	83–68	Fenerbahçe Ülker
2010/11	21-11-2010	Beşiktaş Cola Turka	67–74	Fenerbahçe Ülker
2010/11	12-03-2011	Fenerbahçe Ülker	84–92	Beşiktaş Cola Turka
2011/12	06-11-2011	Beşiktaş Milangaz	83–78	Fenerbahçe Ülker
2011/12	26-12-2012	Fenerbahçe Ülker	86–82	Beşiktaş Milangaz
2011/12	06-05-2012	Beşiktaş Milangaz	96–94	Fenerbahçe Ülker
2011/12	09-05-2012	Fenerbahçe Ülker	74–77	Beşiktaş Milangaz
2012/13	05-11-2012	Fenerbahçe Ülker	83–74	Beşiktaş
2012/13	25-02-2013	Beşiktaş	70–78	Fenerbahçe Ülker
2013/14	27-10-2013	Beşiktaş Integral Forex	69–77	Fenerbahçe Ülker
2013/14	16-02-2014	Fenerbahçe Ülker	90–76	Beşiktaş Integral Forex
2014/15	11-01-2015	Fenerbahçe Ülker	97–59	Beşiktaş Integral Forex
2014/15	09-05-2015	Beşiktaş Integral Forex	74–94	Fenerbahçe Ülker
2015/16	28-11-2015	Beşiktaş Sompo Japan	76–91	Fenerbahçe
2015/16	28-03-2016	Fenerbahçe	100–80	Beşiktaş Sompo Japan
2016/17	08-01-2017	Beşiktaş Sompo Japan	76–79	Fenerbahçe
2016/17	06-05-2017	Fenerbahçe	93–76	Beşiktaş Sompo Japan
2016/17	09-06-2017	Fenerbahçe	75–69	Beşiktaş Sompo Japan
2016/17	11-06-2017	Fenerbahçe	83–74	Beşiktaş Sompo Japan
2016/17	14-06-2017	Beşiktaş Sompo Japan	80–86	Fenerbahçe
2016/17	16-06-2017	Beşiktaş Sompo Japan	94–98	Fenerbahçe
2017/18	31-12-2017	Beşiktaş Sompo Japan	71–76	Fenerbahçe Doğuş
2017/18	05-05-2018	Fenerbahçe Doğuş	83–60	Beşiktaş Sompo Japan
2018/19	06-10-2018	Fenerbahçe Beko	78–73	Beşiktaş Sompo Japan
2018/19	26-01-2019	Beşiktaş Sompo Japan	58–79	Fenerbahçe Beko
2019/20	10-11-2019	Fenerbahçe Beko	84–80	Beşiktaş Sompo Japan
2019/20	08-03-2020	Beşiktaş Sompo Japan	73–74	Fenerbahçe Beko
2020/21	04-10-2020	Beşiktaş	74–83	Fenerbahçe Beko
2020/21	17-01-2021	Fenerbahçe Beko	83–92	Beşiktaş
2021/22	21-11-2021	Beşiktaş Icrypex	74–82	Fenerbahçe Beko
2021/22	19-03-2022	Fenerbahçe Beko	–	Beşiktaş

== Turkish Cup matches ==
Season	Date	Home team	Score	Away team
1966/67	04-04-1967	Beşiktaş	59–74	Fenerbahçe
1967/68	06-03-1968	Beşiktaş	62–60	Fenerbahçe
1971/72	18-03-1972	Beşiktaş	50–38	Fenerbahçe
1992/93	24-02-1993	Beşiktaş	83–78	Fenerbahçe
1993/94	23-03-1994	Beşiktaş	83–92	Fenerbahçe
1997/98	24-12-1997	Beşiktaş	78–87	Fenerbahçe
2006/07	30-09-2006	Beşiktaş Cola Turka	63–88	Fenerbahçe Ülker
2010/11	13-02-2011	Beşiktaş Cola Turka	72–81	Fenerbahçe Ülker
2012/13	08-02-2013	Beşiktaş	66–75	Fenerbahçe Ülker

== European competitions ==
Season	Date	Competition	Round	Home team	Score	Away team
2004/05	15.03.2005	FIBA Europe League	Quarter-finals	Fenerbahçe	70–67	Beşiktaş
2004/05	18.03.2005	FIBA Europe League	Quarter-finals	Beşiktaş	81–64	Fenerbahçe
2004/05	24.03.2005	FIBA Europe League	Quarter-finals	Fenerbahçe	93–73	Beşiktaş
2012/13	15.02.2013	Euroleague	TOP 16	Fenerbahçe Ülker	78–72	Beşiktaş
2012/13	05.04.2013	Euroleague	TOP 16	Beşiktaş	80–73	Fenerbahçe Ülker

== See also ==
- The Intercontinental Derby
- Beşiktaş–Galatasaray rivalry
