= Beşiktaş–Galatasaray rivalry (basketball) =

Basketball rivalry in Turkey

Beşiktaş JK vs Galatasaray SK
- Location: Istanbul, Turkey
- Teams: Beşiktaş JK; Galatasaray SK
- Latest meeting: Beşiktaş 76-77 Galatasaray (22-04-2024)

Statistics
- Total meetings: 142
- Most wins: Galatasaray (76)
- All-time series: Beşiktaş JK: 64; Draws: 3 Galatasaray SK: 76
- Largest victory: BJK 126-79 GS (08.01.1982); GS 84-61 BJK (02.12.1995)

Beşiktaş men's basketball section started out in the year 1933, before being halted in 1936, and then resuming once again in 1940. Since then, Beşiktaş has played in the first Turkish Basketball Super League, in every season, except in the 1988–89 season, due to their relegation to the Turkish Basketball First League after the 1987–88 season. The club won the Turkish Basketball Super League, under the management of Ateş Çubukçu and Tom Davis, in the 1974–75 season.

According to the official records, in Turkey, basketball was first played in 1904 at Robert College. An American physical education teacher laid the foundations of this sport in Turkey. 7 years later, Ahmet Robenson, a physical education teacher in Galatasaray High School decided to introduce a new game to students in 1911. Robenson, who also became a Galatasaray S.K. president later, popularized this sport in Turkey.

Galatasaray SK is the pioneer in Turkish basketball history, and basketball had always been very important for the club. The team has won 11 national championship titles and 15 İstanbul League titles. Former president of the club, Özhan Canaydın was a former player of basketball team.

== Honours ==
Competition	Beşiktaş	Galatasaray
Turkish Super League	2	5
Turkish Championship	–	11
Turkish Cup	1	3
Turkish Super Cup	1	2
EuroCup	-	1
FIBA EuroChallenge	1	-
Total	5	22

== Head to Head ==
As of 18 November 2024

	Matches	Wins Beşiktaş	Draws	Wins Galatasaray
Turkish League	133	57	3	73
Turkish Cup	9	7	0	2
EuroCup	1	0	0	1
Total matches	143	64	3	76

== Sponsorship naming ==
Due to sponsorship deals, Galatasaray and Beşiktaş have been also known as:

- Galatasaray Cafe Crown: 2005–2011
- Galatasaray Medical Park: 2011–2013
- Galatasaray Liv Hospital: 2013–2015
- Galatasaray Odeabank: 2015–2018
- Galatasaray Doğa Sigorta: 2018–2020
- Galatasaray Nef: 2021–2022
- Beşiktaş Cola Turka: 2005–2011
- Beşiktaş Milangaz: 2011–2012
- Beşiktaş Integral Forex: 2013–2015
- Beşiktaş Sompo Japan: 2015–2020
- Beşiktaş Icrypex: 2021-

== Turkish League Matches ==
Season	Date	Home team	Score	Away team
1967/68	02-12-1967	Beşiktaş	60–62	Galatasaray
1967/68	23-03-1968	Galatasaray	69–60	Beşiktaş
1968/69	26-10-1968	Galatasaray	75–62	Beşiktaş
1968/69	12-03-1969	Beşiktaş	65–80	Galatasaray
1969/70	15-11-1969	Beşiktaş	70–67	Galatasaray
1969/70	24-01-1970	Galatasaray	63–66	Beşiktaş
1970/71	29-11-1970	Galatasaray	84–64	Beşiktaş
1970/71	13-02-1971	Beşiktaş	60–70	Galatasaray
1971/72	14-11-1971	Beşiktaş	82–56	Galatasaray
1971/72	13-02-1972	Galatasaray	68–70	Beşiktaş
1972/73	04-11-1972	Beşiktaş	74–74	Galatasaray
1972/73	21-01-1973	Galatasaray	80–73	Beşiktaş
1973/74	30-12-1973	Galatasaray	65–65	Beşiktaş
1973/74	10-02-1974	Beşiktaş	77–74	Galatasaray
1974/75	07-12-1974	Galatasaray	74–74	Beşiktaş
1974/75	01-03-1975	Beşiktaş	87–74	Galatasaray
1975/76	16-11-1975	Beşiktaş	73–57	Galatasaray
1975/76	31-01-1976	Galatasaray	76–95	Beşiktaş
1976/77	17-10-1976	Galatasaray	88–80	Beşiktaş
1976/77	23-01-1977	Beşiktaş	82–66	Galatasaray
1977/78	02-10-1977	Galatasaray	67–61	Beşiktaş
1977/78	29-01-1978	Beşiktaş	83–68	Galatasaray
1978/79	15-10-1978	Beşiktaş	83–72	Galatasaray
1978/79	27-01-1979	Galatasaray	89–92	Beşiktaş
1979/80	06-01-1980	Beşiktaş	103–76	Galatasaray
1979/80	29-03-1980	Galatasaray	86–103	Beşiktaş
1980/81	09-11-1980	Galatasaray	87–93	Beşiktaş
1980/81	23-11-1980	Beşiktaş	101–82	Galatasaray
1981/82	08-01-1982	Beşiktaş	126–79	Galatasaray
1981/82	07-02-1982	Beşiktaş	94–89	Galatasaray
1981/82	17-03-1982	Beşiktaş	100–79	Galatasaray
1982/83	03-10-1982	Beşiktaş	87–86	Galatasaray
1982/83	12-12-1982	Galatasaray	113–118	Beşiktaş
1983/84	19-10-1983	Beşiktaş	80–95	Galatasaray
1983/84	08-01-1984	Galatasaray	91–86	Beşiktaş
1984/85	17-11-1984	Beşiktaş	90–104	Galatasaray
1984/85	02-02-1985	Galatasaray	110–103	Beşiktaş
1985/86	02-11-1985	Galatasaray	97–80	Beşiktaş
1985/86	21-12-1985	Beşiktaş	100–87	Galatasaray
1986/87	14-12-1986	Beşiktaş	80–64	Galatasaray
1986/87	14-02-1987	Galatasaray	73–80	Beşiktaş
1986/87	08-03-1987	Galatasaray	82–73	Beşiktaş
1986/87	10-03-1987	Beşiktaş	88–61	Galatasaray
1986/87	12-03-1987	Galatasaray	88–78	Beşiktaş
1987/88	06-12-1987	Galatasaray	78–66	Beşiktaş
1987/88	27-02-1988	Beşiktaş	68–90	Galatasaray
1989/90	21-10-1989	Galatasaray	90–77	Beşiktaş
1989/90	18-01-1990	Beşiktaş	88–90	Galatasaray
1990/91	30-09-1990	Galatasaray	97–100	Beşiktaş
1990/91	29-12-1990	Beşiktaş	87–102	Galatasaray
1991/92	28-12-1991	Beşiktaş	83–70	Galatasaray
1991/92	25-03-1992	Galatasaray	91–79	Beşiktaş
1992/93	06-12-1992	Beşiktaş	70–69	Galatasaray
1992/93	14-03-1993	Galatasaray	83–77	Beşiktaş
1993/94	12-12-1993	Galatasaray	72–77	Beşiktaş
1993/94	10-04-1994	Beşiktaş	91–101	Galatasaray
1994/95	22-12-1994	Galatasaray	80–58	Beşiktaş
1994/95	28-03-1995	Beşiktaş	67–76	Galatasaray
1995/96	02-12-1995	Galatasaray	84–61	Beşiktaş
1995/96	17-03-1996	Beşiktaş	76–66	Galatasaray
1996/97	10-11-1996	Beşiktaş	67–70	Galatasaray
1996/97	29-03-1997	Galatasaray	85–71	Beşiktaş
1997/98	14-09-1997	Galatasaray	87–78	Beşiktaş
1997/98	17-01-1998	Beşiktaş	82–87	Galatasaray
1998/99	12-09-1998	Beşiktaş	61–73	Galatasaray
1998/99	03-01-1999	Galatasaray	60–62	Beşiktaş
1999/00	18-12-1999	Galatasaray	63–85	Beşiktaş
1999/00	25-03-2000	Beşiktaş	80–71	Galatasaray
2000/01	19-11-2000	Beşiktaş	82–60	Galatasaray
2000/01	03-03-2001	Galatasaray	64–62	Beşiktaş

Season	Date	Home team	Score	Away team
2001/02	29-12-2001	Galatasaray	82–78	Beşiktaş
2001/02	06-04-2002	Beşiktaş	102–77	Galatasaray
2002/03	02-11-2002	Beşiktaş	74–88	Galatasaray
2002/03	22-02-2003	Galatasaray	82–65	Beşiktaş
2003/04	08-11-2003	Galatasaray	71–89	Beşiktaş
2003/04	15-02-2004	Beşiktaş	94–76	Galatasaray
2004/05	18-12-2004	Galatasaray	71–83	Beşiktaş
2004/05	27-03-2005	Beşiktaş	75–64	Galatasaray
2005/06	23-10-2005	Beşiktaş Cola Turka	80–62	Galatasaray Cafe Crown
2005/06	03-02-2006	Galatasaray Cafe Crown	62–77	Beşiktaş Cola Turka
2006/07	11-11-2006	Beşiktaş Cola Turka	60–67	Galatasaray Cafe Crown
2006/07	24-02-2007	Galatasaray Cafe Crown	70–81	Beşiktaş Cola Turka
2006/07	04-05-2007	Galatasaray Cafe Crown	83–65	Beşiktaş Cola Turka
2006/07	06-05-2007	Galatasaray Cafe Crown	80–73	Beşiktaş Cola Turka
2006/07	08-05-2007	Beşiktaş Cola Turka	81–89	Galatasaray Cafe Crown
2007/08	24-11-2007	Beşiktaş Cola Turka	75–80	Galatasaray Cafe Crown
2007/08	07-03-2008	Galatasaray Cafe Crown	66–83	Beşiktaş Cola Turka
2008/09	27-12-2008	Beşiktaş Cola Turka	66–58	Galatasaray Cafe Crown
2008/09	18-04-2009	Galatasaray Cafe Crown	111–94	Beşiktaş Cola Turka
2008/09	16-05-2009	Galatasaray Cafe Crown	84–74	Beşiktaş Cola Turka
2008/09	18-05-2009	Galatasaray Cafe Crown	80–66	Beşiktaş Cola Turka
2008/09	21-05-2009	Beşiktaş Cola Turka	113–71	Galatasaray Cafe Crown
2008/09	23-05-2009	Beşiktaş Cola Turka	102–115	Galatasaray Cafe Crown
2009/10	02-01-2010	Beşiktaş Cola Turka	87–96	Galatasaray Cafe Crown
2009/10	17-04-2010	Galatasaray Cafe Crown	95–84	Beşiktaş Cola Turka
2010/11	21-11-2010	Beşiktaş Cola Turka	71–73	Galatasaray Cafe Crown
2010/11	25-04-2011	Galatasaray Cafe Crown	81–73	Beşiktaş Cola Turka
2010/11	12-05-2011	Galatasaray Cafe Crown	94–90	Beşiktaş Cola Turka
2010/11	15-05-2011	Beşiktaş Cola Turka	70–80	Galatasaray Cafe Crown
2011/12	17-12-2011	Beşiktaş Milangaz	73–65	Galatasaray Medical Park
2011/12	02-04-2012	Galatasaray Medical Park	92–81	Beşiktaş Milangaz
2011/12	15-05-2012	Galatasaray Medical Park	75–74	Beşiktaş Milangaz
2011/12	17-05-2012	Galatasaray Medical Park	72–81	Beşiktaş Milangaz
2011/12	20-05-2012	Beşiktaş Milangaz	74–65	Galatasaray Medical Park
2011/12	22-05-2012	Beşiktaş Milangaz	84–73	Galatasaray Medical Park
2012/13	02-12-2012	Galatasaray Medical Park	64–60	Beşiktaş
2012/13	25-03-2013	Beşiktaş	72–76	Galatasaray Medical Park
2013/14	20-10-2013	Galatasaray Liv Hospital	87–82	Beşiktaş Integral Forex
2013/14	03-02-2014	Beşiktaş Integral Forex	82–78	Galatasaray Liv Hospital
2013/14	13-05-2014	Galatasaray Liv Hospital	70–72	Beşiktaş Integral Forex
2013/14	17-05-2014	Beşiktaş Integral Forex	64–66	Galatasaray Liv Hospital
2013/14	20-05-2014	Galatasaray Liv Hospital	78–65	Beşiktaş Integral Forex
2014/15	23-11-2014	Galatasaray Liv Hospital	100–94	Beşiktaş Integral Forex
2014/15	14-03-2015	Beşiktaş Integral Forex	64–65	Galatasaray Liv Hospital
2015/16	28-12-2015	Galatasaray Odeabank	90–76	Beşiktaş Sompo Japan
2015/16	01-05-2016	Beşiktaş Sompo Japan	71–76	Galatasaray Odeabank
2016/17	21-11-2016	Galatasaray Odeabank	84–78	Beşiktaş Sompo Japan
2016/17	20-03-2017	Beşiktaş Sompo Japan	90–84	Galatasaray Odeabank
2017/18	16-12-2017	Beşiktaş Sompo Japan	80–78	Galatasaray Odeabank
2017/18	22-04-2018	Galatasaray Odeabank	77–73	Beşiktaş Sompo Japan
2018/19	25-11-2018	Beşiktaş Sompo Japan	72–74	Galatasaray Odeabank
2018/19	23-03-2019	Galatasaray Odeabank	93–87	Beşiktaş Sompo Japan
2019/20	12-10-2019	Galatasaray Doğa Sigorta	74–65	Beşiktaş Sompo Sigorta
2019/20	01-02-2020	Beşiktaş Sompo Sigorta	74–68	Galatasaray Doğa Sigorta
2020/21	10-10-2020	Galatasaray	97–89	Beşiktaş Sompo Sigorta
2020/21	24-01-2021	Beşiktaş Sompo Sigorta	82–64	Galatasaray
2021/22	30-11-2021	Galatasaray Nef	90–73	Beşiktaş Icrypex
2021/22	27-03-2022	Beşiktaş Icrypex	62–74	Galatasaray Nef
2022/23	22-10-2022	Galatasaray Nef	67–74	Beşiktaş Emlakjet
2022/23	04-03-2023	Beşiktaş Emlakjet	85–76	Galatasaray Nef
2023/24	24-12-2023	Galatasaray Ekmas	89–83	Beşiktaş Emlakjet
2023/24	22-04-2024	Beşiktaş Emlakjet	76–77	Galatasaray Ekmas
2024/25	09-11-2024	Galatasaray	91–88	Beşiktaş Fibabanka

== Turkish Cup Matches ==
Season	Date	Home team	Score	Away team
1968/69	09-03-1968	Beşiktaş	58–54	Galatasaray
1970/71	24-03-1971	Beşiktaş	52–51	Galatasaray
1991/92	05-02-1992	Beşiktaş	81–82	Galatasaray
1998/99	25-03-1999	Beşiktaş	88–66	Galatasaray
2007/08	04-10-2007	Beşiktaş Cola Turka	73–58	Galatasaray Cafe Crown
2008/09	06-10-2008	Beşiktaş Cola Turka	88–73	Galatasaray Cafe Crown
2010/11	10-10-2010	Beşiktaş Cola Turka	89–80	Galatasaray Cafe Crown
2011/12	16-02-2012	Beşiktaş Milangaz	76–69	Galatasaray Medical Park
2013/14	04-10-2013	Beşiktaş Integral Forex	67–69	Galatasaray Liv Hospital

== European Competitions ==
Season	Date	Competition	Round	Home team	Score	Away team
2007/08	10.04.2008	ULEB Cup	Quarter-finals	Beşiktaş Cola Turka	60–61	Galatasaray Cafe Crown

== See also ==
- The Intercontinental Derby
- Beşiktaş - Fenerbahçe rivalry (basketball)
