= The Intercontinental Derby (basketball) =

Turkish basketball match

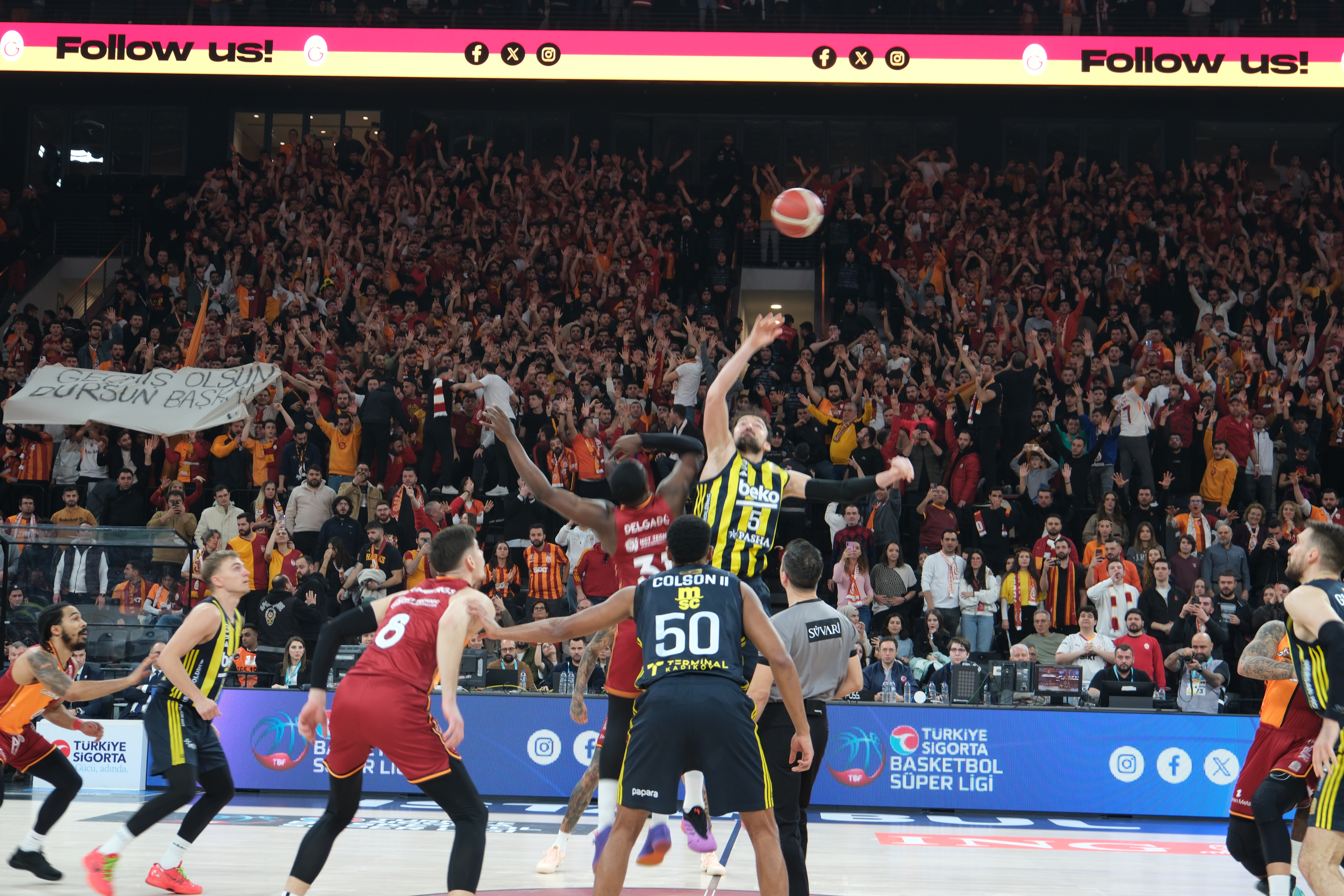
- Other names: Ezelî Rekabet (The Eternal Rivalry)
- Location: Istanbul, Turkey
- Teams: Fenerbahçe SK; Galatasaray SK
- First meeting: Galatasaray 20–0 Fenerbahçe 24 March 1933; 93 years ago
- Latest meeting: Fenerbahçe 79–77 Galatasaray (8 February 2026)

Statistics
- Total meetings: 261
- Most wins: Fenerbahçe (137)
- All-time series: Fenerbahçe: 137; Drawn: 3 Galatasaray: 120

Post-season history
- 1984–85: Galatasaray won, 2–1; 2011 TBL Playoffs: Fenerbahçe won, 4–2; 2014 TBL Playoffs: Fenerbahçe won, 4–3

The Intercontinental Derby (Turkish: Kıtalararası Derbi), also known as the Eternal Rivalry (Turkish: Ezelî Rekabet), is the name given to any basketball match between Fenerbahçe SK and Galatasaray SK, teams of the Asian and the European parts of Istanbul respectively. Fenerbahçe is the most successful of the two clubs, having won more head to head fixtures and having clinched more trophies in the past seasons, including the highest level tier of European basketball, the EuroLeague trophy, where the winners are considered the biggest team of Europe.

== History ==
According to the official records, in Turkey, basketball was first played in 1904 at Robert College. An American physical education teacher laid the foundations of this sport in Turkey. Seven years later, in 1911, Ahmet Robenson, a physical education teacher at a high school, decided to introduce a new game to the students. Robenson popularized this sport in Turkey.

Galatasaray are considered to be the pioneers in Turkish basketball, and the sport has always been very important for the club. The team have won 11 national championship titles and 15 Istanbul League titles. Former president of the club, Özhan Canaydın, was a former player of the basketball team.

The men's basketball department of Fenerbahçe was founded in 1913 and achieved considerable success when the sport established itself in Turkey. Fenerbahçe have won seven Istanbul League titles and three national championship titles in 1957, 1959 and 1965, just before the professional nationwide league was founded in 1966, and participated in the European Champions Cup in 1960 and 1966. Their fans had to wait until 1991 for another title, when Levent Topsakal, Larry Richard, and head coach Çetin Yılmaz led Fenerbahçe to the Turkish League title over Tofaş.

=== Basketball rivalry ===
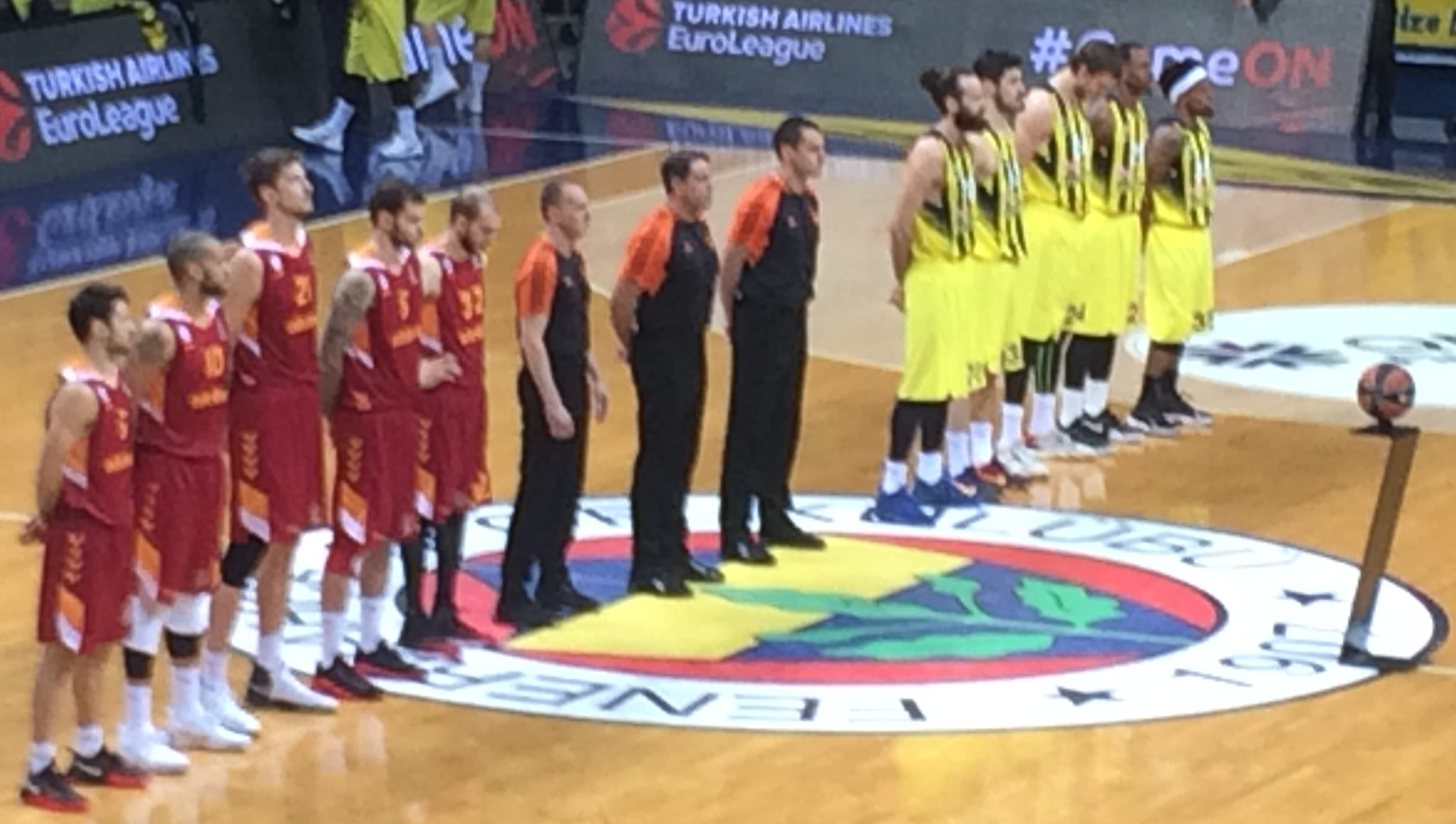
2016–17 EuroLeague match

Fenerbahçe consider themselves as the pioneers of basketball in Turkey, boasting their success in winning more trophies in the past seasons, including the 2016–17 EuroLeague title, which is marked as the first ever EuroLeague title won by a Turkish basketball club.

== Culture ==
The clubs originate from two different sides of the Bosphorus. Fenerbahçe SK were founded in Kadıköy that is located on the Asian side of Istanbul, while Galatasaray SK were founded in the Beyoğlu district, on the European side of Istanbul. Both clubs naturally draw the majority of their support from the side of the city that they are native to, but maintain a significant majority of support drawn from the rest of Turkey.

== Honours ==
Competition	Fenerbahçe	Galatasaray
Turkish League	16	18
Turkish Cup	10	3
Turkish Super Cup	9	2
Istanbul Basketball League	7	15
EuroLeague	2	–
EuroCup	–	1
Total	44	39

== List of all matches ==
#	Date	Competition	Home team	Score	Away team
1	24-03-1933	Basketbol Ligi	Galatasaray	20–0	Fenerbahçe
~	~	~	~	~	~
152	12-10-2002	Basketbol Ligi	Fenerbahçe	68–96	Galatasaray
153	09-02-2003	Basketbol Ligi	Galatasaray	76–74	Fenerbahçe
154	07-05-2003	Basketbol Ligi	Galatasaray	96–88	Fenerbahçe
155	11-05-2003	Basketbol Ligi	Fenerbahçe	83–66	Galatasaray
156	15-05-2003	Basketbol Ligi	Galatasaray	71–74	Fenerbahçe
157	18-05-2003	Basketbol Ligi	Fenerbahçe	78–91	Galatasaray
158	12-10-2003	Basketbol Ligi	Galatasaray	66–64	Fenerbahçe
159	17-01-2004	Basketbol Ligi	Fenerbahçe	98–79	Galatasaray
160	02-01-2005	Basketbol Ligi	Fenerbahçe	80–69	Galatasaray
161	09-04-2005	Basketbol Ligi	Galatasaray	63–90	Fenerbahçe
162	14-01-2006	Basketbol Ligi	Fenerbahçe	78–71	Galatasaray
163	05-05-2006	Basketbol Ligi	Galatasaray	75–59	Fenerbahçe
164	03-12-2006	Basketbol Ligi	Fenerbahçe	75–64	Galatasaray
165	18-03-2007	Basketbol Ligi	Galatasaray	57–91	Fenerbahçe
166	14-05-2007	Basketbol Ligi	Fenerbahçe	76–70	Galatasaray
167	18-05-2007	Basketbol Ligi	Galatasaray	64–69	Fenerbahçe
168	18-12-2007	Basketbol Ligi	Galatasaray	88–77	Fenerbahçe
169	26-03-2008	Basketbol Ligi	Fenerbahçe	76–72	Galatasaray
170	03-01-2009	Basketbol Ligi	Galatasaray	78–62	Fenerbahçe
171	24-04-2009	Basketbol Ligi	Fenerbahçe	89–62	Galatasaray
172	15-11-2009	Basketbol Ligi	Galatasaray	0–20	Fenerbahçe
173	27-02-2010	Basketbol Ligi	Fenerbahçe	81–77	Galatasaray
174	30-12-2010	Basketbol Ligi	Galatasaray	67–56	Fenerbahçe
175	11-02-2011	Turkish Cup	Fenerbahçe	77–70	Galatasaray
176	20-04-2011	Basketbol Ligi	Fenerbahçe	83–80	Galatasaray
177	04-06-2011	Basketbol Ligi	Fenerbahçe	81–59	Galatasaray
178	06-06-2011	Basketbol Ligi	Fenerbahçe	95–74	Galatasaray
179	09-06-2011	Basketbol Ligi	Galatasaray	97–93	Fenerbahçe
180	11-06-2011	Basketbol Ligi	Galatasaray	74–85	Fenerbahçe
181	14-06-2011	Basketbol Ligi	Fenerbahçe	71–72	Galatasaray
182	17-06-2011	Basketbol Ligi	Galatasaray	88–91	Fenerbahçe
183	12-10-2011	Presidential Cup	Fenerbahçe	97–103	Galatasaray
184	30-12-2011	Basketbol Ligi	Fenerbahçe	80–79	Galatasaray
185	11-04-2012	Basketbol Ligi	Galatasaray	84–72	Fenerbahçe
186	04-10-2012	Turkish Cup	Galatasaray	74–69	Fenerbahçe
187	19-12-2012	Basketbol Ligi	Fenerbahçe	74–67	Galatasaray
188	10-02-2013	Turkish Cup	Fenerbahçe	63–57	Galatasaray
189	14-04-2013	Basketbol Ligi	Galatasaray	66–53	Fenerbahçe
190	09-10-2013	Presidential Cup	Galatasaray	62–64	Fenerbahçe
191	10-12-2013	Basketbol Ligi	Galatasaray	72–62	Fenerbahçe
192	31-03-2014	Basketbol Ligi	Fenerbahçe	77–52	Galatasaray
193	03-06-2014	Basketbol Ligi	Fenerbahçe	89–70	Galatasaray
194	05-06-2014	Basketbol Ligi	Fenerbahçe	74–73	Galatasaray
195	08-06-2014	Basketbol Ligi	Galatasaray	73–64	Fenerbahçe
196	10-06-2014	Basketbol Ligi	Galatasaray	88–82	Fenerbahçe
197	13-06-2014	Basketbol Ligi	Fenerbahçe	76–63	Galatasaray
198	16-06-2014	Basketbol Ligi	Galatasaray	85–77	Fenerbahçe
199	19-06-2014	Basketbol Ligi	Fenerbahçe	20–00	Galatasaray
200	17-11-2014	Basketbol Ligi	Fenerbahçe	85–74	Galatasaray
201	10-03-2015	Basketbol Ligi	Galatasaray	92–88	Fenerbahçe
202	21-05-2015	Basketbol Ligi	Fenerbahçe	93–67	Galatasaray
203	24-05-2015	Basketbol Ligi	Galatasaray	70–69	Fenerbahçe
204	27-05-2015	Basketbol Ligi	Fenerbahçe	67–59	Galatasaray
205	02-11-2015	Basketbol Ligi	Galatasaray	80–63	Fenerbahçe
206	27-02-2016	Basketbol Ligi	Fenerbahçe	77–68	Galatasaray
207	25-05-2016	Basketbol Ligi	Fenerbahçe	93–79	Galatasaray
208	27-05-2016	Basketbol Ligi	Fenerbahçe	80–55	Galatasaray
209	29-05-2016	Basketbol Ligi	Galatasaray	65–63	Fenerbahçe
210	31-05-2016	Basketbol Ligi	Galatasaray	75–82	Fenerbahçe
211	28-10-2016	EuroLeague	Galatasaray	87–103	Fenerbahçe
212	13-11-2016	Basketbol Ligi	Fenerbahçe	92–74	Galatasaray
213	26-01-2017	EuroLeague	Fenerbahçe	85–80	Galatasaray
214	12-03-2017	Basketbol Ligi	Galatasaray	75–79	Fenerbahçe
215	29-10-2017	Basketbol Ligi	Galatasaray	62–83	Fenerbahçe
216	04-03-2018	EuroLeague	Fenerbahçe	80–60	Galatasaray
217	23-12-2018	Basketbol Ligi	Galatasaray	84–74	Fenerbahçe

== Statistics ==
=== Head to Head ===
Club	G	W	D	L
Fenerbahçe SK	261	137	3	120
Galatasaray SK	261	120	3	137

Last update: 19 October 2026

== See also ==
- The Intercontinental Derby
- Beşiktaş–Fenerbahçe rivalry (basketball)
- Beşiktaş–Galatasaray rivalry (basketball)
