= 2017–18 Fenerbahçe S.K. (basketball) season =

Fenerbahçe Doğuş
2017–18 season
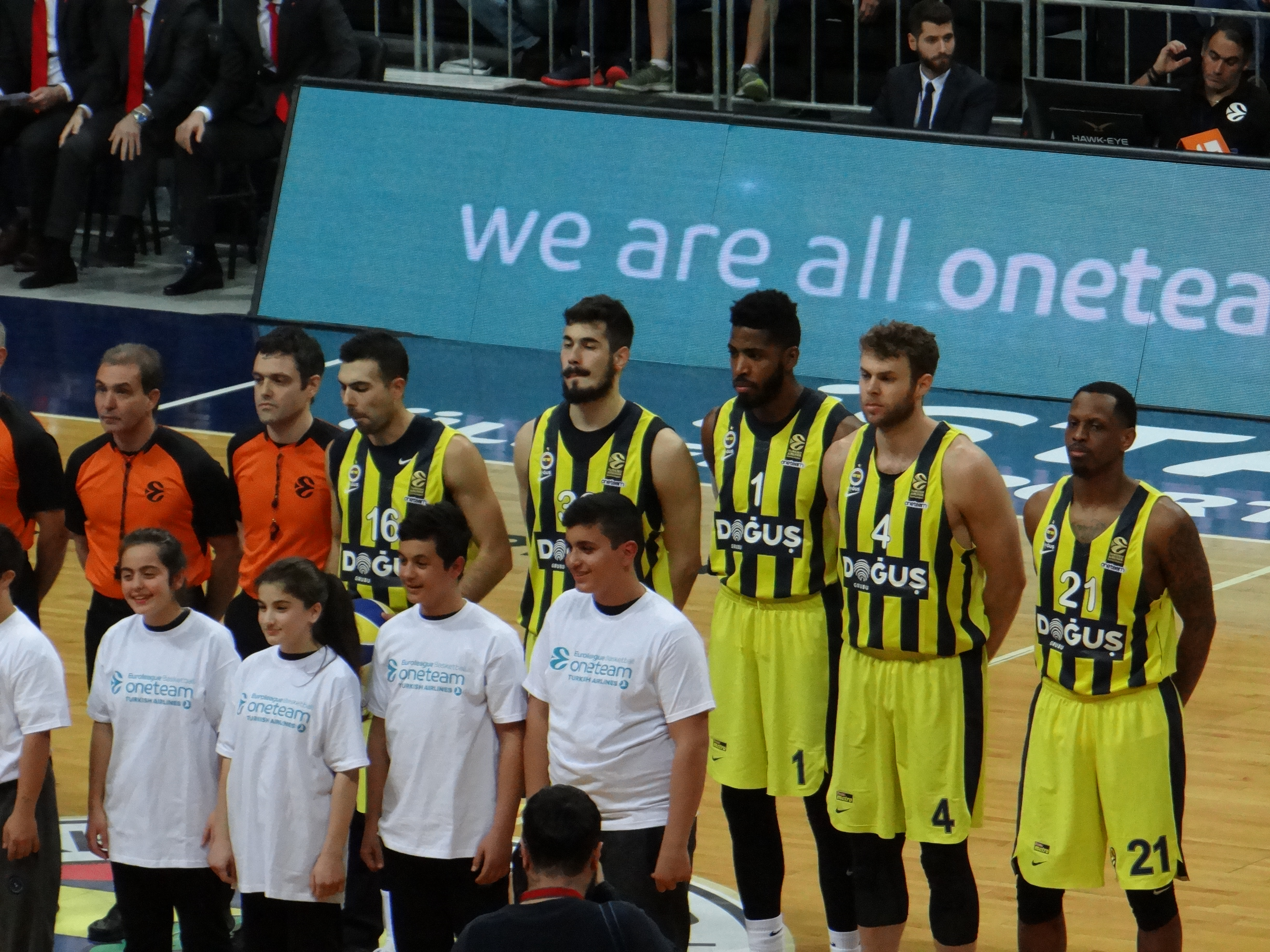
- Starting five of Fenerbahçe before a game against Crvena zvezda on 19 December 2017
- Owner: Fenerbahçe S.K.
- Chairman: Aziz Yıldırım (until 3 June 2018); Ali Koç
- Head coach: Željko Obradović
- Arena: Ülker Sports and Event Hall
- BSL: 1st seed
- Playoffs: Winners
- EuroLeague: 2nd seed
- Playoffs: Runners-up
- Turkish Cup: Quarter-finals (knocked out by Anadolu Efes)
- Presidential Cup: Winners
- PIR leader: (Czech Republic) Veselý 13.4
- Scoring leader: (United States) Wanamaker 11.7
- Rebounding leader: (United States) Thompson 5.8
- Assists leader: (Greece) Sloukas 5.0
Home	Away

The 2017–18 Fenerbahçe Basketball season was the 104th season in the existence of the club. The team played in the Basketbol Süper Ligi (BSL) and in the European first tier EuroLeague. This is the first season the team was known as Fenerbahçe Doğuş, due to sponsorship reasons.

== Players ==
=== Squad information ===
Note: Flags indicate national team eligibility at FIBA-sanctioned events. Players may hold other non-FIBA nationalities not displayed.

Fenerbahçe Doğuş roster
Players
Coaches

Pos.	No.	Nat.	Name	Ht.	Wt.	Age
F/C	1	(United States)	Thompson, Jason	2.11 m (6 ft 11 in)	113 kg (249 lb)	31 – 21 July 1986
F	4	(Italy)	Melli, Nicolò	2.05 m (6 ft 9 in)	107 kg (236 lb)	27 – 26 January 1991
PF	5	(Turkey)	Hersek, Barış	2.08 m (6 ft 10 in)	104 kg (229 lb)	30 – 26 March 1988
PF	9	(Turkey)	Duran, Ahmet (injured)	2.06 m (6 ft 9 in)	118 kg (260 lb)	19 – 28 January 1999
PG	10	(Turkey)	Mahmutoğlu, Melih (C)	1.91 m (6 ft 3 in)	85 kg (187 lb)	28 – 12 May 1990
G	11	(United States)	Wanamaker, Brad	1.93 m (6 ft 4 in)	95 kg (209 lb)	28 – 25 July 1989
G	16	(Greece)	Sloukas, Kostas	1.90 m (6 ft 3 in)	95 kg (209 lb)	28 – 15 January 1990
G/F	18	(Turkey)	Arna, Egehan	2.03 m (6 ft 8 in)	93 kg (205 lb)	21 – 5 January 1997
G/F	21	(United States)	Nunnally, James	2.01 m (6 ft 7 in)	90 kg (198 lb)	27 – 14 July 1990
G	23	(Serbia)	Gudurić, Marko	1.99 m (6 ft 6 in)	91 kg (201 lb)	23 – 8 March 1995
F/C	24	(Czech Republic)	Veselý, Jan	2.13 m (7 ft 0 in)	110 kg (243 lb)	28 – 24 April 1990
G	32	(Turkey)	Güler, Sinan	1.92 m (6 ft 4 in)	95 kg (209 lb)	34 – 8 November 1983
SF	33	(Serbia)	Kalinić, Nikola (injured)	2.03 m (6 ft 8 in)	101 kg (223 lb)	26 – 8 November 1991
PG	35	(Turkey)	Dixon, Bobby (injured) (DC)	1.78 m (5 ft 10 in)	73 kg (161 lb)	35 – 10 April 1983
F/C	44	(Jordan)	Düverioğlu, Ahmet (DC)	2.10 m (6 ft 11 in)	121 kg (267 lb)	25 – 4 March 1993
SF	70	(Italy)	Datome, Luigi	2.03 m (6 ft 8 in)	98 kg (216 lb)	30 – 27 November 1987

Head coach

- (Serbia) Željko Obradović

Assistant coach(es)

- (Serbia) Vladimir Androić
- (Turkey) Erdem Can
- (Spain) Josep Maria Izquierdo
- (Turkey) Berkay Oğuz

Athletic trainer(s)

- (Serbia) Predrag Zimonjić
- (Turkey) İlker Belgutay

Physiotherapist(s)

- (Turkey) Sefa Öztürk

Team manager

- (Italy) Maurizio Gherardini
- (Turkey) Cenk Renda

Legend

- (C) Team captain
- Injured

- Roster
Updated: June 14, 2018

=== Transfers ===
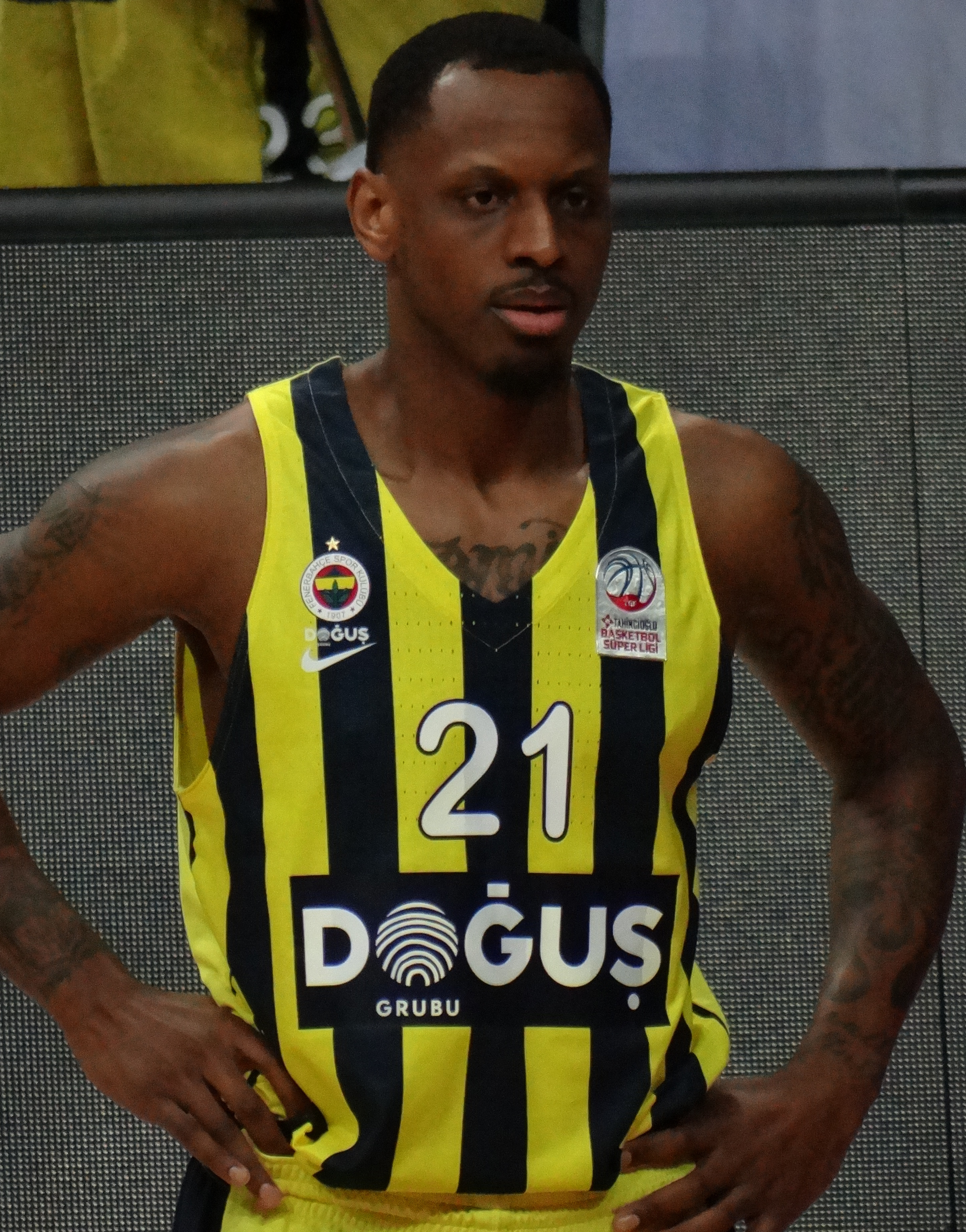
James Nunnally

Players In	Transfer fee	Moving from
(Turkey) Sinan Güler	Free agent	(Turkey) Galatasaray
(Italy) Nicolo Melli	Free agent	(Germany) Brose Baskets
(Serbia) Marko Gudurić	€1,000,000	(Serbia) Crvena zvezda
(United States) Jason Thompson	Free agent	(China) Shandong Golden Stars
(United States) Brad Wanamaker	Free agent	(Turkey) Darüşşafaka
Players Out	Transfer fee	Moving to
(Serbia) Bogdan Bogdanović	Free agent	(United States) Sacramento Kings
(United States) Ekpe Udoh	Free agent	(United States) Utah Jazz
(Turkey) Berk Uğurlu	Free agent	(Turkey) Pınar Karşıyaka
(North Macedonia) Pero Antić	Free agent	(Serbia) Crvena zvezda
(Bulgaria) Yordan Minchev	Loan	(North Macedonia) KK MZT Skopje

== Technical staff ==
- General Manager
  (Italy) Maurizio Gherardini
- Team Manager
  (Turkey) Cenk Renda
- Head coach
  (Serbia) Željko Obradović
- Assistant coach
  (Spain) Josep Maria Izquierdo
  (Serbia) Vladimir Androić
  (Turkey) Erdem Can
  (Turkey) Berkay Oğuz
- Conditioning coach
  (Serbia) Predrag Zimonjić
  (Turkey) İlker Belgutay
- Physiotherapist
  (Turkey) Sefa Öztürk

== Kit ==
- Supplier: Nike
- Main sponsor: Doğuş Group
- Back sponsor: QNB Finansbank
- Short sponsor: -

Home	Away

== Pre-season and friendlies ==
22 September 2017 Zadar Tourn. 2017	Fenerbahçe Doğuş (Turkey)	89–90(OT)	(Germany) Brose Bamberg	Zadar, Croatia
(FET)	Scoring by quarter: 22–17, 10–13, 21–19, 16–20, Overtime: 10–10, 10–11
		Report		Arena: Krešimir Ćosić Hall

23 September 2017 Zadar Tourn. 2017	Fenerbahçe Doğuş (Turkey)	76–65	(Russia) Khimki	Zadar, Croatia
(FET)	Scoring by quarter: 23–17, 19–17, 20–20, 14–11
		Report		Arena: Krešimir Ćosić Hall

24 September 2017 Zadar Tourn. 2017	Fenerbahçe Doğuş (Turkey)	76–72	(Russia) CSKA Moscow	Zadar, Croatia
(FET)	Scoring by quarter: 15–19, 22–13, 15–19, 24–21
		Report		Arena: Krešimir Ćosić Hall

Fenerbahçe finished the tournament as champions

25 September 2017	Fenerbahçe Doğuş (Turkey)	82–78	(Slovenia) Petrol Olimpija	Ljubljana, Slovenia
(FET)	Scoring by quarter: 15–20, 21–15, 18–21, 28–22
		Report

26 September 2017	Fenerbahçe Doğuş (Turkey)	82–68	(Serbia) Partizan	Belgrade, Serbia
(FET)	Scoring by quarter: 27–16, 10–16, 22–21, 23–15
		Report

27 September 2017	Fenerbahçe Doğuş (Turkey)	93–81	(Serbia) Borac Čačak	Čačak, Serbia
(FET)	Scoring by quarter: 26–16, 21–23, 18–30, 28–12
		Report

== Competitions ==
=== Overall ===
Competition	Started round	Final position / round	First match	Last match
Turkish Basketball Presidential Cup	Final	Champions	4 October 2017	
Turkish Basketball Super League	Matchday 1	Champions	7 October 2017	13 June 2018
Turkish Basketball Cup	Quarterfinals	Quarterfinalists	14 February 2018	
EuroLeague	Matchday 1	Runners-up	12 October 2017	20 May 2018

Source: Competitions

=== Overview ===
Competition	Record							
Competition	Pld	W	D	L	PF	PA	PD	Win %
Turkish Basketball Presidential Cup	1	1	0	0	75	64	+11	100.00
Turkish Basketball Super League	30	27	0	3	2,618	2,179	+439	90.00
TBSL Playoffs	10	9	0	1	893	740	+153	90.00
Turkish Cup	1	0	0	1	80	83	−3	0.00
EuroLeague	36	25	0	11	2,889	2,693	+196	69.44
Total	78	62	0	16	6,555	5,759	+796	79.49

Source: Competitions

=== Turkish Basketball Presidential Cup ===
4 October 2017 Presidential Cup	Fenerbahçe Doğuş	75–64	Banvit	Ankara
19:00	Scoring by quarter: 19 - 11, 20 - 17, 21 - 20, 15 - 16
	Pts: Veselý 18; Rebs: Thompson 13; Asts: Sloukas 4	Boxscore	Pts: Caloiaro 15; Rebs: Vidmar 7 Asts: four players 3	Arena: Ankara Arena; Referees: Ozan Çakar - Ziya Özorhan - Mehmet Şahin

2017 Presidential Cup champions
Fenerbahçe
(7th title)

=== Turkish Basketball Super League ===
==== League table ====
Pos	Team	Pld	W	L	PF	PA	PD	Pts	Qualification or relegation
1	Fenerbahçe Doğuş	30	27	3	2618	2179	+439	57	Advance to playoffs
2	Tofaş	30	24	6	2538	2328	+210	54	Advance to playoffs
3	Anadolu Efes (Note: Anadolu Efes was conducted one point after the team left the court unauthorized during the semi-finals of the playoffs in the 2016–17 season.)	30	22	8	2501	2397	+104	51	Advance to playoffs
4	Beşiktaş Sompo Japan	30	20	10	2288	2170	+118	50	Advance to playoffs
5	Banvit	30	18	12	2371	2278	+93	48	Advance to playoffs

Source: Basketbol Süper Ligi
Notes:

Win Loss

==== Regular season ====
7 October 2017 1	Fenerbahçe Doğuş	80–63	Banvit	Istanbul
13:00	Scoring by quarter: 18–12, 42–34, 64–41, 80–63
	Pts: Thompson 16; Rebs: Thompson 9 Asts: Wanamaker, Sloukas 4	Boxscore	Pts: Odum 24; Rebs: Thomas 7 Asts: Altıntığ, Geçim 2	Arena: Ülker Sports Arena; Referees: Aytuğ Ekti, Erşan Kartal, Duhan Köyiçi

15 October 2017 2	Anadolu Efes	84–80	Fenerbahçe Doğuş	Istanbul
17:00	Scoring by quarter: 18–19, 27–21, 22–16, 17–24
	Pts: McCollum 29; Rebs: Dunston, McCollum, Ledo 6 Asts: McCollum 5	Boxscore	Pts: Wanamaker 20; Rebs: Vesely 9 Asts: Sloukas 3	Arena: Sinan Erdem Dome; Attendance: Emin Moğulkoç, Özlem Yalman, Polat Parlak

22 October 2017 3	Fenerbahçe Doğuş	96–71	Gaziantep Basketbol	Istanbul
15:15	Scoring by quarter: 28–17, 16–30, 28–12, 24–12
	Pts: Vesely 20; Rebs: Melli 11; Asts: Nunnally, Wanamaker 6	Boxscore	Pts: Armand 19; Rebs: Rudd 9 Asts: Armand 6	Arena: Ülker Sports Arena; Referees: Ahmet Ersan Ergüler, Ozan Çakar, Ahmet Tatlıcı

29 October 2017 4	Galatasaray	62–83	Fenerbahçe Doğuş	Istanbul
17:00	Scoring by quarter: 12–21, 19–22, 9–20, 22–20
	Pts: Renfroe 13; Rebs: Summers 8 Asts: Renfroe 8	Boxscore	Pts: Gudurić 18; Rebs: Güler 8 Asts: Güler 6	Arena: Sinan Erdem Dome; Referees: Mehmet Keseratar, Osman Sinan İşgüder, Can Mavisu

5 November 2017 5	Fenerbahçe Doğuş	97–71	Pınar Karşıyaka	Istanbul
15:15	Scoring by quarter: 21–17, 24–21, 26–12, 26–21
	Pts: "two players" 15; Rebs: Thompson 5 Asts: Sloukas 10	Boxscore	Pts: Jones 17; Rebs: "two players" 6 Asts: Berk İbrahim 7	Arena: Ülker Sports Arena; Referees: Ali Serkan Emlek, Kaan Büyükçil, Ziya Özorhon

12 November 2017 6	Darüşşafaka	84–78	Fenerbahçe Doğuş	Istanbul
17:00	Scoring by quarter: 15–18, 30–15, 14–21, 25–24
	Pts: Wilbekin 30; Rebs: Johnson 6 Asts: Ulubay 5	Boxscore	Pts: Wanamaker 22; Rebs: Datome 10; Asts: Sloukas 5	Arena: Volkswagen Arena; Referees: Fatih Arslanoğlu, Mehmet Karabilecen, Halit Can Cihan

19 November 2017 7	Eskişehir Basket	66–85	Fenerbahçe Doğuş	Eskişehir
15:15	Scoring by quarter: 24–25, 14–23, 9–22, 19–15
	Pts: Rowland 17; Rebs: Rowland 8 Asts: two players 5	Boxscore	Pts: Melih 20; Rebs: two players 5 Asts: Dixon 5	Arena: Anadolu Üniversitesi Arena; Referees: Ali Şakacı, Mehmet Serdar Ünal, Mehmet Şahin

28 November 2017 8	Fenerbahçe Doğuş	82–59	Demir İnşaat Büyükçekmece	Istanbul
20:15	Scoring by quarter: 21–13, 24–16, 15–12, 22–18
	Pts: Nunnally 13; Rebs: Thompson 9 Asts: Sloukas 6	Boxscore	Pts: Baykan 14; Rebs: three players 4 Asts: Wright 6	Arena: Ülker Sports Arena; Referees: Zafer Yılmaz, Alper Özgök, Duhan Köyiçi

3 December 2017 9	Trabzonspor	90–119	Fenerbahçe Doğuş	Trabzon
15:15	Scoring by quarter: 25–25, 23–30, 26–32, 16–32
	Pts: Eldridge 21; Rebs: Green 6 Asts: Green 6	Boxscore	Pts: Nunnally 20; Rebs: three players 5 Asts: Nunnally 8	Arena: Hayri Gür Arena; Referees: Özlem Yalman, Ahmet Tatlıcı, Kerem Baki

10 December 2017 10	Fenerbahçe Doğuş	85–72	Yeşilgiresun Belediye	Istanbul
19:30	Scoring by quarter: 26–16, 25–18, 19–12, 15–26
	Pts: Melli 16; Rebs: Melli 8 Asts: three players 4	Boxscore	Pts: Williams 15; Rebs: Williams 8 Asts: Gagić, Boynton 4	Arena: Ülker Sports Arena; Referees: Ziya Özorhon, Mehmet Karabilecen, Özge Şentürk

17 December 2017 11	TOFAŞ	71–88	Fenerbahçe Doğuş	Bursa
15:15	Scoring by quarter: 10–13, 22–27, 20–19, 19–29
	Pts: Kadji 20; Rebs: Morgan 8 Asts: Ermiş 6	Boxscore	Pts: Datome 24; Rebs: Melli 10; Asts: Wanamaker 7	Arena: Tofaş Sports Hall; Referees: Mehmet Keseratar, Kaan Büyükçil, Polat Parlak

24 December 2017 12	Fenerbahçe Doğuş	89–72	Muratbey Uşak	Istanbul
13:00	Scoring by quarter: 26–23, 20–11, 18–19, 25–19
	Pts: Melih 18; Rebs: Melli 8 Asts: Sinan 6	Boxscore	Pts: Hamilton 20; Rebs: Hamilton 14; Asts: three players 3	Arena: Ülker Sports Arena; Referees: Alper Altuğ Köselerli, İsmail Aydın, Seher Ayşe Nur Yazıcıoğlu

31 January 2018 13	Beşiktaş Sompo Japan	71–76	Fenerbahçe Doğuş	Istanbul
13:00	Scoring by quarter: 10–21, 20–24, 21–20, 20–11
	Pts: Lima, Weems 12; Rebs: Lima 8 Asts: Boatright, Diebler 4	Boxscore	Pts: Vesely, Gudurić 15; Rebs: Melli 9 Asts: Melli 5	Arena: BJK Akatlar Arena; Referees: Aytuğ Ekti, Zafer Yılmaz, Ali Şakacı

7 January 2018 14	Fenerbahçe Doğuş	89–75	Sakarya Büyükşehir	Istanbul
19:30	Scoring by quarter: 28–15, 20–28, 17–21, 24–11
	Pts: Thompson 16; Rebs: Thompson, Gudurić 6 Asts: Wanamaker 7	Boxscore	Pts: Harris 17; Rebs: Fall 8 Asts: Harris 4	Arena: Ülker Sports Arena; Referees: Mehmet Serdar Ünal, Halil Baldemir, Can Mavisu

13 January 2018 15	İstanbul BBSK	70–83	Fenerbahçe Doğuş	Istanbul
20:15	Scoring by quarter: 13–23, 23–22, 15–16, 19–22
	Pts: Birčević 19; Rebs: Buva 11; Asts: Toolson 6	Boxscore	Pts: Melli 12; Rebs: Thompson 12; Asts: Sloukas 10	Arena: Cebeci Arena; Referees: Erşan Kartal, Ahmet Ersan Ergüler, Ahmet Tatlıcı

28 January 2018 16	Banvit	63–61	Fenerbahçe Doğuş	Balıkesir
17:00	Scoring by quarter: 14–15, 17–19, 18–11, 14–16
	Pts: Angelo 17; Rebs: Adonis 6 Asts: Andrew 7	Boxscore	Pts: Datome 20; Rebs: three players 5 Asts: Wanamaker 4	Arena: Kara Ali Acar Arena; Referees: Emin Moğulkoç, Özlem Yalman, Kaan Büyükçil

4 February 2018 17	Fenerbahçe Doğuş	100–74	Anadolu Efes	Istanbul
13:00	Scoring by quarter: 27–10, 30–24, 14–22, 29–18
	Pts: Wanamaker 15; Rebs: Thompson 11; Asts: Vesely 6	Boxscore	Pts: McCollum 22; Rebs: Štimac 9 Asts: Douglas	Arena: Ülker Sports Arena; Referees: Yener Yılmaz, Ziya Özorhon, Kerem Baki

11 February 2018 18	Gaziantep Basketbol	90–95	Fenerbahçe Doğuş	Gaziantep
15:15	Scoring by quarter: 14–21, 25–24, 23–21, 28–29
	Pts: Sean 20; Rebs: Robert 8 Asts: Can Uğur 7	Boxscore	Pts: Vesely 18; Rebs: Thompson 8 Asts: Sloukas 4	Arena: Karataş Şahinbey Arena; Referees: Mehmet Keseratar, Semih Vural, Duhan Köyiçi

4 March 2018 19	Fenerbahçe Doğuş	80–60	Galatasaray	Istanbul
13:00	Scoring by quarter: 18–13, 19–18, 19–20, 24–9
	Pts: Düverioğlu 21; Rebs: Düverioğlu 9 Asts: Güler 5	Boxscore	Pts: Hardy 23; Rebs: Hendrix 6 Asts: Renfroe 4	Arena: Ülker Sports Arena; Referees: Erşan Kartal, Ozan Çakar, Mehmet Şahin

11 March 2018 20	Pınar Karşıyaka	69–74	Fenerbahçe Doğuş	İzmir
19:30	Scoring by quarter: 12–15, 17–19, 20–21, 20–19
	Pts: Kennedy 22; Rebs: Kennedy 6 Asts: three players 5	Boxscore	Pts: Wanamaker 16; Rebs: Vesely 7 Asts: three players 3	Arena: M. Kemal Atatürk Karşıyaka Sport Hall; Referees: Alper Altuğ Köselerş, Halil Baldemir, Serhat Büker

18 March 2018 21	Fenerbahçe Doğuş	76–69	Darüşşafaka Basketbol	Istanbul
13:00	Scoring by quarter: 18–18, 27–18, 17–18, 14–15
	Pts: Datome 17; Rebs: Ahmet 8 Asts: Sloukas 4	Boxscore	Pts: Kidd 16; Rebs: Furkan 6 Asts: Scottie Wilbekin 7	Arena: Ülker Sports Arena; Referees: Aytuğ Ekti, Mehmet Serdar Ünal, Seher Ayşe Nur Yazıcıoğlu

22 March 2018 22	Fenerbahçe Doğuş	79–69	Eskişehir Basket	Istanbul
15:15	Scoring by quarter: 23–19, 27–15, 12–18, 17–17
	Pts: Melih 16; Rebs: Ahmet 7 Asts: Bobby 7	Boxscore	Pts: Viacheslav 27; Rebs: Jeffrey 8 Asts: Tuncer 10	Arena: Ülker Sports Arena; Referees: Ali Serkan Emlek, Özlem Yalman, Halit Can Cihan

31 March 2018 23	Demir İnşaat Büyükçekmece	80–88	Fenerbahçe Doğuş	Istanbul
17:00	Scoring by quarter: 20–27, 18–17, 21–22, 21–22
	Pts: Erving Walker 26; Rebs: two players 5 Asts: Bracey 7	Boxscore	Pts: Luigi 16; Rebs: Thompson 7 Asts: Sloukas 7	Arena: Gazanfer Bilge Arena; Referees: Ahmet Ersan Ergüler, Semih Vural, Ali Şakacı

7 April 2018 24	Fenerbahçe Doğuş	112–83	Trabzonspor	Istanbul
20:15	Scoring by quarter: 31–24, 26–20, 23–23, 32–16
	Pts: Wanamaker 19; Rebs: Düverioğlu 8 Asts: Sloukas 7	Boxscore	Pts: Eldridge 22; Rebs: Green 8 Asts: Eldridge 6	Arena: Ülker Sports Arena; Referees: Emin Moğulkoç, Osman Sinan İşgüder, Özge Şentürk

13 April 2018 25	Yeşilgiresun Belediye	70–93	Fenerbahçe Doğuş	Giresun
18:00	Scoring by quarter: 12–22, 19–26, 26–18, 13–27
	Pts: Kenneth 16; Rebs: Darrell 10; Asts: Kenneth 5	Boxscore	Pts: Wanamaker 16; Rebs: Nicolò 5 Asts: Sloukas 6	Arena: 19 Eylül Arena; Referees: Ersan Kartal, Alper Altuğ Köselerli, Can Mavisu

28 April 2018 26	Fenerbahçe Doğuş	81–90	TOFAŞ	Istanbul
17:00	Scoring by quarter: 25–14, 16–25, 16–24, 24–27
	Pts: Calloway 20; Rebs: Carmichael 12; Asts: Calloway 10	Boxscore	Pts: three players 13; Rebs: Thompson 11; Asts: Güler 7	Arena: Ülker Sports Arena; Referees: Ziya Özorhon, İsmail Aydın, Kerem Baki

2 May 2018 27	Muratbey Uşak	98–78	Fenerbahçe Doğuş	Uşak
20:30	Scoring by quarter: 25–20, 24–18, 21–15, 28–25
	Pts: Düverioğlu 19; Rebs: Düverioğlu 8 Asts: Sloukas 6	Boxscore	Pts: Morgan 18; Rebs: Morgan 7 Asts: three players	Arena: Uşak Üniversitesi Arena; Referees: Yener Yılmaz, Mehmet Serdar Ünal, Osman Sinan İşgüder

5 May 2018 28	Fenerbahçe Doğuş	83–60	Beşiktaş Sompo Japan	Istanbul
13:00	Scoring by quarter: 17–16, 17–13, 19–15, 30–16
	Pts: Dixon 18; Rebs: Thompson 9 Asts: Vesely 7	Boxscore	Pts: Adams 20; Rebs: Clark 6 Asts: Clark, Adams 3	Arena: Ülker Sports Arena; Referees: Mehmet Keseratar, Alper Özgök, Mehmet Karabilecen

8 May 2018 29	Sakarya Büyükşehir	79–83	Fenerbahçe Doğuş	Sakarya
18:30	Scoring by quarter: 17–24, 25–27, 8–16, 29–16
	Pts: Clavell 20; Rebs: Fall 9 Asts: Fall 6	Boxscore	Pts: Thompson 17; Rebs: Vesely 6 Asts: Mahmutoğlu 6	Arena: Sakarya Arena; Referees: Aytuğ Ekti, Ozan Çakar, Mehmet Şahin

22 May 2018 30	Fenerbahçe Doğuş	96–73	İstanbul BBSK	Istanbul
16:00	Scoring by quarter: 21–21, 28–19, 22–17, 25–16
	Pts: Düverioğlu 18; Rebs: Düverioğlu 10; Asts: Gudurić 5	Boxscore	Pts: Olmaz, Thompson 16; Rebs: Klobučar 7 Asts: Thompson 7	Arena: Ülker Sports Arena; Referees: Kaan Büyükçil, Halil Baldemir, Özge Şentürk

==== Playoffs ====
===== Quarterfinals =====
23 May 2018 1	Fenerbahçe Doğuş	81–66	Sakarya BB	Istanbul
20:45 EEST	Scoring by quarter: 23–20, 21–10, 15–24, 22–12
	Pts: Melli, Nunnally 15; Rebs: Melli 6 Asts: Sloukas 7	Report	Pts: Clavell 16; Rebs: Boothe 8 Asts: Jones 6	Arena: Ülker Sports Arena

25 May 2018 2	Sakarya BB	54–77	Fenerbahçe Doğuş	Sakarya
18:15 EEST	Scoring by quarter: 15–20, 13–18, 14–18, 12–21
	Pts: Jones 11; Rebs: Fall 7 Asts: Fall, Jones 3	Report	Pts: Datome 20; Rebs: Düverioğlu 8 Asts: Gudurić 4	Arena: Sakarya Arena

===== Semifinals =====
28 May 2018 1	Fenerbahçe Doğuş	86–81	Banvit	Istanbul
20:45 EEST	Scoring by quarter: 23–20, 21–10, 15–24, 22–12
	Pts: Nunnally 22; Rebs: Melli 8 Asts: Melli 8	Report	Pts: Caloiaro 29; Rebs: Caloiaro, Rautins 5 Asts: Taylor 7	Arena: Ülker Sports Arena

30 May 2018 2	Fenerbahçe Doğuş	98–93(OT)	Banvit	Istanbul
20:45 EEST	Scoring by quarter: 18–15, 20–21, 22–20, 20–24, Overtime: 18–13
	Pts: Wanamaker 24; Rebs: Veselý 7 Asts: Sloukas 7	Report	Pts: Rautins 22; Rebs: Rautins 8 Asts: Vidmar 7	Arena: Ülker Sports Arena

1 June 2018 3	Banvit	73–84	Fenerbahçe Doğuş	Balıkesir
20:45 EEST	Scoring by quarter: 16–27, 14–21, 20–16, 23–20
	Pts: Kulig 28; Rebs: Kulig, Caloiaro 4 Asts: Rautins 6	Report	Pts: Wanamaker 16; Rebs: Thompson 7 Asts: Sloukas 6	Arena: Kara Ali Acar Arena

===== Finals =====
5 June 2018 1	Fenerbahçe Doğuş	103–63	Tofaş	Istanbul
21:00 EEST	Scoring by quarter: 21–15, 26–15, 33–12, 23–21
	Pts: Wanamaker 17; Rebs: Melli, Düverioğlu 8 Asts: Sloukas 6	Report	Pts: Ermiş 13; Rebs: Durmaz 5 Asts: Arslan 4	Arena: Ülker Sports Arena

7 June 2018 2	Fenerbahçe Doğuş	86–78	Tofaş	Istanbul
21:00 EEST	Scoring by quarter: 19–17, 18–19, 26–15, 23–27
	Pts: Wanamaker 18; Rebs: Veselý 5 Asts: Güler 6	Report	Pts: Three players 16; Rebs: Mejía 5 Asts: Henry 9	Arena: Ülker Sports Arena

9 June 2018 3	Tofaş	91–88	Fenerbahçe Doğuş	Bursa
19:00 EEST	Scoring by quarter: 26–26, 26–23, 16–18, 23–21
	Pts: Mejía 23; Rebs: Henry 7 Asts: Henry, Crocker 8	Report	Pts: Wanamaker 20; Rebs: Thompson 7 Asts: Wanamaker 6	Arena: Tofaş Sports Hall

11 June 2018 4	Tofaş	77–95	Fenerbahçe Doğuş	Bursa
21:00 EEST	Scoring by quarter: 17–22, 22–28, 21–21, 17–24
	Pts: Henry 21; Rebs: Owens, Kadji 6 Asts: Henry 10	Report	Pts: Datome 25; Rebs: Melli 5 Asts: Veselý, Sloukas 5	Arena: Tofaş Sports Hall

13 June 2018 5	Fenerbahçe Doğuş	94–64	Tofaş	Istanbul
21:00 EEST	Scoring by quarter: 25–12, 20–14, 24–22, 25–16
	Pts: Düverioğlu 19; Rebs: Düverioğlu 9 Asts: Sloukas 8	Report	Pts: Henry 17; Rebs: Durmaz 8 Asts: Henry 9	Arena: Ülker Sports Arena

=== Turkish Basketball Cup ===
==== Quarterfinals ====
14 February 2018	Fenerbahçe Doğuş	80–83	Anadolu Efes	Istanbul
20:00	Scoring by quarter: 14–26, 22–19, 25–22, 19–16
	Pts: Veselý 18; Rebs: Datome 7 Asts: Gudurić 7	Report	Pts: Bryant 23; Rebs: Krunoslav 8 Asts: Krunoslav 7	Arena: Sinan Erdem Dome

=== EuroLeague ===
==== Regular season ====
Pos	Team	Pld	W	L	PF	PA	PD	Qualification
1	(Russia) CSKA Moscow	30	24	6	2675	2377	+298	Advance to Playoffs
2	(Turkey) Fenerbahçe Doğuş	30	21	9	2381	2208	+173	Advance to Playoffs
3	(Greece) Olympiacos	30	19	11	2268	2250	+18	Advance to Playoffs
4	(Greece) Panathinaikos Superfoods	30	19	11	2334	2291	+43	Advance to Playoffs
5	(Spain) Real Madrid	30	19	11	2576	2375	+201	Advance to Playoffs

Source: EuroLeague
Rules for classification: All points scored in extra period(s) will not be counted in the standings, nor for any tie-break situation.

Win Loss

12 October 2017 1.	Unicaja Málaga (Spain)	68–67	(Turkey) Fenerbahçe Doğuş	Málaga
	Scoring by quarter: 20–20, 16–21, 14–16, 18–10
	Pts: Shermadini 12; Rebs: Brooks 6 Asts: three players 3	Boxscore	Pts: Sloukas 15; Rebs: Veselý 7 Asts: Sloukas 7	Arena: Jose Maria Marchin Carpena Arena; Attendance: 8.267; Referees: (Greece) Christos Christodoulou (Serbia) Ilija Belosevic (Estonia) Rain Peerandi

19 October 2017 2.	EA7 Emporio Armani Milano (Italy)	86–92(OT)	(Turkey) Fenerbahçe Doğuş	Milan
	Scoring by quarter: 21–23, 17–14, 16–27, 26–16, Overtime: 6–12
	Pts: M'Baye, Bertāns 16; Rebs: Tarczewski 6 Asts: Theodore 7	Boxscore	Pts: Sloukas 17; Rebs: Melli 11; Asts: Sloukas 9	Arena: Mediolanum Forum; Attendance: 8.336; Referees: (Spain) Miguel Perez Perez (Greece) Ioannis Foufis (Poland) Jakub Zamojski

25 October 2017 3.	Fenerbahçe Doğuş (Turkey)	81–70	(Turkey) Anadolu Efes	Istanbul
20:45	Scoring by quarter: 15–20, 19–14, 28–18, 19–18
	Pts: Veselý 15; Rebs: Melli 8 Asts: Wanamaker 7	Boxscore	Pts: Simon 20; Rebs: three players 5 Asts: Simon 4	Arena: Ülker Sports Arena; Attendance: 10.977; Referees: (Spain) Daniel Hierrezuelo (Serbia) Milivoje Jovcic (Lithuania) Artūras Šukys

27 October 2017 4.	Panathinaikos Superfoods (Greece)	70–68	(Turkey) Fenerbahçe Doğuş	Athens
21:30	Scoring by quarter: 19–21, 17–23, 17–11, 17–13
	Pts: Pappas 24; Rebs: Singleton 8 Asts: Calathes 6	Boxscore	Pts: Veselý 15; Rebs: Melli 8 Asts: Sloukas 4	Arena: O.A.C.A. Attendance: 12.680; Referees: (Ukraine) Borys Ryzhyk (Germany) Robert Lottermoser (Spain) Benjamin Jimenez

2 November 2017 5.	Fenerbahçe Doğuş (Turkey)	79–66	(Spain) Valencia	Istanbul
20:45	Scoring by quarter: 20–18, 18–12, 19–19, 22–17
	Pts: Datome 16; Rebs: Melli 6 Asts: Sloukas 7	Boxscore	Pts: Fernando 11; Rebs: Will 8 Asts: two players 4	Arena: Ülker Sports Arena; Attendance: 10.215; Referees: (Serbia) Ilija Belosevic (Slovenia) Matej Boltauzer (Greece) Elias Koromilas

10 November 2017 6.	Brose Baskets (Spain)	57–80	(Turkey) Fenerbahçe Doğuş	Bamberg
22:00	Scoring by quarter: 16–21, 17–22, 13–11, 11–26
	Pts: Rubit 12; Rebs: Wright 8 Asts: Zisis, Lô 3	Boxscore	Pts: Veselý 15; Rebs: Sloukas, Wanamaker 6 Asts: Sloukas 7	Arena: Brose Arena; Attendance: 5.920; Referees: (Spain) Daniel Hierrezuelo (Croatia) Tomislav Hordov (France) Mehdi Difallah

15 November 2017 7.	Fenerbahçe Doğuş (Turkey)	83–90(OT)	(Greece) Olympiacos	Istanbul
	Scoring by quarter: 17–18, 23–12, 13–27, 22–18, Overtime: 8–15
	Pts: Nunnally 22; Rebs: Nunnally 4 Asts: Nunnally, Datome 4	Boxscore	Pts: Roberts 21; Rebs: Printezis 7 Asts: Papanikolaou 6	Arena: Ülker Sports Arena; Attendance: (Ukraine) Borys Ryzhyk (Spain) Benjamin Jimenez (Italy) Carmelo Paternico

17 November 2017 8.	CSKA Moscow (Russia)	93–95(OT)	(Turkey) Fenerbahçe Doğuş	Moscow
20:00	Scoring by quarter: 16–27, 25–19, 22–15, 20–22, Overtime: 10–12
	Pts: Rodríguez 20; Rebs: Clyburn 6 Asts: de Colo 6	Boxscore	Pts: Veselý 31; Rebs: Thompson 12; Asts: Sloukas, Wanamaker 9	Arena: Megasport Arena; Attendance: 11.213; Referees: (Slovenia) Sasa Pukl (Germany) Robert Lottermoser (Latvia) Oļegs Latiševs

24 November 2017 9.	Fenerbahçe Doğuş (Turkey)	71–67	(Russia) Khimki	Istanbul
20:45	Scoring by quarter: 24–15, 14–11, 20–22, 13–19
	Pts: Nunnally 20; Rebs: Datome 7 Asts: Wanamaker 6	Boxscore	Pts: Shved 21; Rebs: Robinson 5 Asts: Shved 5	Arena: Ülker Sports Arena; Attendance: 11.508; Referees: (Greece) Christos Christodoulou (Serbia) Ilija Belosevic (Spain) Juan Carlos Garcia Gonzalez

30 November 2017 10.	Kirolbet Baskonia (Spain)	69–83	(Turkey) Fenerbahçe Doğuş	Vitoria-Gasteiz
22:30	Scoring by quarter: 25–15, 12–26, 14–25, 18–17
	Pts: Shengelia 13; Rebs: Voigtmann 6 Asts: Granger 6	Boxscore	Pts: Nunnally 16; Rebs: Wanamaker 6 Asts: Sloukas - Veselý 6	Arena: Fernando Buesa Arena; Attendance: 11.213; Referees: (Italy) Luigi Lamonica - (Croatia) Sreten Radovic - (Slovenia) Matej Boltauzer

8 December 2017 11.	FC Barcelona Lassa (Spain)	68–83	(Turkey) Fenerbahçe Doğuş	Barcelona
21:00	Scoring by quarter: 28–22, 10–17, 13–25, 17–19
	Pts: Hanga 15; Rebs: Séraphin 9 Asts: Heurtel 10; PIR: Hanga 18	Boxscore	Pts: Sloukas 17; Rebs: Datome 9 Asts: Sloukas 5 PIR: Sloukas 17	Arena: Palau Blaugrana; Attendance: 6,437; Referees: Robert Lottermoser (GER), Elias Koromilas (GRE), Milan Nedović (SLO)

14 December 2017 12.	Fenerbahçe Doğuş (Turkey)	90–89	(Lithuania) Žalgiris	Istanbul
18:45	Scoring by quarter: 24–16, 18–25, 22–22, 25–27
	Pts: Veselý 20; Rebs: Veselý 5 Asts: Nunnally 6 PIR: Veselý 29	Boxscore	Pts: Pangos 22; Rebs: Toupane 7 Asts: Pangos 7 PIR: Pangos 23	Arena: Ülker Sports Arena; Attendance: 11,031; Referees: Miguel Pérez Pérez (ESP), Piotr Pastusiak (POL), Spiros Gkontas (GRE)

19 December 2017 13.	Fenerbahçe Doğuş (Turkey)	82–56	(Serbia) Crvena zvezda	Istanbul
18:45	Scoring by quarter: 17–11, 24–22, 21–9, 20–14
	Pts: Veselý 15; Rebs: Veselý 8 Asts: Sloukas 8 PIR: Veselý 24	Boxscore	Pts: Dobrić 15; Rebs: Lessort 9 Asts: Dangubić 4 PIR: Dobrić 17	Arena: Ülker Sports Arena; Attendance: 10,439; Referees: Christos Christodoulou (GRE), Fernando Rocha (POR), Michele Rossi (ITA)

21 December 2017 14.	Maccabi Tel Aviv (Israel)	82–73	(Turkey) Fenerbahçe Doğuş	Tel Aviv
20:05	Scoring by quarter: 24–15, 16–21, 20–18, 22–19
	Pts: Jackson 20; Rebs: Bolden 9 Asts: Bolden, Jackson 5 PIR: Jackson 22	Boxscore	Pts: Veselý 18; Rebs: Melli 8 Asts: Muhammed 5 PIR: Veselý 27	Arena: Nokia Arena; Attendance: 10,728; Referees: Damir Javor (SLO), Carlos Peruga (ESP), Joseph Bissang (FRA)

28 December 2017 15.	Fenerbahçe Doğuş (Turkey)	77–79	(Spain) Real Madrid	Istanbul
18:45	Scoring by quarter: 17–10, 19–27, 25–25, 16–17
	Pts: Wanamaker 20; Rebs: Melli 7 Asts: Sloukas, Nunnally 3 PIR: Wanamaker 23	Boxscore	Pts: Dončić 20; Rebs: Dončić 8 Asts: Dončić 10; PIR: Dončić 37	Arena: Ülker Sports Arena; Attendance: 12,918; Referees: Robert Lottermoser (GER), Elias Koromilas (GRE), Carmelo Paternico (ITA)

5 January 2018 16.	Fenerbahçe Doğuş (Turkey)	79–74	(Spain) Kirolbet Baskonia	Istanbul
18:45	Scoring by quarter: 18–22, 18–16, 27–21, 16–15
	Pts: Gudurić 18; Rebs: Thompson 10; Asts: three players 4 PIR: Wanamaker 24	Boxscore	Pts: Shengelia 15; Rebs: Poirier, Shengelia 6 Asts: Granger 5 PIR: Shengelia 22	Arena: Ülker Sports Arena; Attendance: 11,392; Referees: Saša Pukl (SLO), Sreten Radović (CRO), Jakub Zamojski (POL)

11 January 2018 17.	Valencia (Spain)	67–80	(Turkey) Fenerbahçe Doğuş	Valencia
20:45	Scoring by quarter: 7–18, 20–15, 23–18, 17–29
	Pts: Abalde 11; Rebs: Dubljević, Pleiß 5 Asts: Van Rossom 7 PIR: Abalde 17	Boxscore	Pts: Gudurić 15; Rebs: Melli 11; Asts: Sloukas 10; PIR: Melli 20	Arena: Pabellon Municipal Fuente San Luis; Attendance: 7,216; Referees: Christos Christodoulou (GRE), Milivoje Jovčić (SRB), Michele Rossi (ITA)

17 January 2018 18.	Fenerbahçe Doğuş (Turkey)	67–62	(Greece) Panathinaikos Superfoods	Istanbul
18:45	Scoring by quarter: 18–20, 17–10, 12–20, 20–12
	Pts: Thompson 17; Rebs: Veselý 8 Asts: seven players 2 PIR: Thompson 18	Boxscore	Pts: Singleton 14; Rebs: Singleton 12; Asts: Calathes 7 PIR: Singleton 20	Arena: Ülker Sports Arena; Attendance: 12,597; Referees: Luigi Lamonica (ITA), Fernando Rocha (POR), Oļegs Latiševs (LAT)

19 January 2018 19.	Anadolu Efes (Turkey)	84–89	(Turkey) Fenerbahçe Doğuş	Istanbul
18:30	Scoring by quarter: 24–24, 11–22, 22–22, 27–21
	Pts: Douglas 29; Rebs: Brown 6 Asts: Dragić 5 PIR: Douglas 36	Boxscore	Pts: Wanamaker 18; Rebs: Melli 7 Asts: Wanamaker 8 PIR: Wanamaker 31	Arena: Sinan Erdem Dome; Attendance: 5,009; Referees: Juan Carlos García González (ESP), Carmelo Paternicò (ITA), Anne Panther (GER)

26 January 2018 20.	Fenerbahçe Doğuş (Turkey)	86–82	(Spain) FC Barcelona Lassa	Istanbul
18:45	Scoring by quarter: 22–18, 20–26, 23–13, 21–25
	Pts: Wanamaker 24; Rebs: Veselý, Wanamaker 5 Asts: Wanamaker 7 PIR: Wanamaker 33	Boxscore	Pts: Heurtel 21; Rebs: Tomić 7 Asts: Ribas 7 PIR: Tomić 27	Arena: Ülker Sports Arena; Attendance: 12,930; Referees: Ilija Belošević (SRB), Saša Pukl (SLO), Sérgio Silva (POR)

1 February 2018 21.	Olympiacos (Greece)	95–70	(Turkey) Fenerbahçe Doğuş	Piraeus
20:00	Scoring by quarter: 34–18, 11–18, 26–18, 24–16
	Pts: Spanoulis, Strēlnieks 19; Rebs: Printezis 7 Asts: four players 3 PIR: Spanoulis, Strēlnieks 22	Boxscore	Pts: Dixon 24; Rebs: Düverioğlu, Veselý 5 Asts: Güler, Sloukas 3 PIR: Dixon 20	Arena: Peace and Friendship Stadium; Attendance: 10,892; Referees: Luigi Lamonica (ITA), Robert Lottermoser (GER), Carlos Peruga (ESP)

9 February 2018 22.	Fenerbahçe Doğuş (Turkey)	77–69	(Germany) Brose Baskets	Istanbul
18:45	Scoring by quarter: 16–13, 26–19, 19–16, 16–21
	Pts: Veselý 26; Rebs: Veselý 11; Asts: Wanamaker 5 PIR: Veselý 36	Boxscore	Pts: Musli 18; Rebs: Musli 8 Asts: Nikolić, Wright 3 PIR: Musli 22	Arena: Ülker Sports Arena; Attendance: 9,812; Referees: Christos Christodoulou (GRE), Borys Rhyzhyk (UKR), David Romano (ISR)

22 February 2018 23.	Fenerbahçe Doğuş (Turkey)	89–70	(Italy) EA7 Emporio Armani Milano	Istanbul
18:45	Scoring by quarter: 23–20, 25–13, 17–15, 24–22
	Pts: Thompson 15; Rebs: Melli 6 Asts: Sloukas, Wanamaker 6 PIR: Sloukas 19	Boxscore	Pts: Micov 19; Rebs: Tarczewski 8 Asts: Cinciarini 7 PIR: Micov 21	Arena: Ülker Sports Arena; Attendance: 10,164; Referees: Juan Carlos García González (ESP), Milivoje Jovčić (SRB), Ioannis Foufis (GRE)

2 March 2018 24.	Real Madrid (Spain)	83–86	(Turkey) Fenerbahçe Doğuş	Madrid
21:00	Scoring by quarter: 20–20, 25–20, 20–28, 18–18
	Pts: Carroll 15; Rebs: Ayón, Tavares 6 Asts: Campazzo 5 PIR: Dončić 17	Boxscore	Pts: Sloukas 20; Rebs: Thompson 6 Asts: Sloukas 4 PIR: Sloukas 24	Arena: Wizink Center; Attendance: 11,385; Referees: Luigi Lamonica (ITA), Matej Boltauzer (SLO), Tomislav Hordov (CRO)

9 March 2018 25.	Žalgiris (Lithuania)	78–85	(Turkey) Fenerbahçe Doğuş	Kaunas
19:00	Scoring by quarter: 24–17, 16–14, 18–21, 20–33
	Pts: Jankūnas 15; Rebs: Jankūnas, Milaknis 5 Asts: Micić 5 PIR: Jankūnas 23	Boxscore	Pts: Datome 16; Rebs: Melli 5 Asts: Kalinić 6 PIR: Sloukas 21	Arena: Žalgiris Arena; Attendance: 15,238; Referees: Robert Lottermoser (GER), Emilio Pérez Pizarro (ESP), Michele Rossi (ITA)

16 March 2018 26.	Fenerbahçe Doğuş (Turkey)	79–81	(Russia) CSKA Moscow	Istanbul
18:45	Scoring by quarter: 23–25, 17–19, 18–10, 21–27
	Pts: Melli 18; Rebs: Veselý 7 Asts: Sloukas 5 PIR: Veselý 23	Boxscore	Pts: Vorontsevich 17; Rebs: Clyburn, Vorontsevich 4 Asts: De Colo 8 PIR: Vorontsevich 22	Arena: Ülker Sports Arena; Attendance: 12,947; Referees: Daniel Hierrezuelo (ESP), Damir Javor (SLO), Carmelo Paternicò (ITA)

20 March 2018 27.	Fenerbahçe Doğuş (Turkey)	87–73	(Israel) Maccabi Tel Aviv	Istanbul
18:45	Scoring by quarter: 16–21, 29–15, 29–20, 13–17
	Pts: Gudurić 23; Rebs: Thompson 7 Asts: Sloukas 5 PIR: Gudurić 29	Boxscore	Pts: Jackson 13; Rebs: Bolden, Parakhouski 7 Asts: Jackson 3 PIR: Bolden 17	Arena: Ülker Sports Arena; Attendance: 10,909; Referees: Miguel Pérez Pérez (ESP), Oļegs Latiševs (LAT), Piotr Pastusiak (POL)

22 March 2018 28.	Crvena zvezda (Serbia)	63–80	(Turkey) Fenerbahçe Doğuş	Belgrade
19:00	Scoring by quarter: 17–22, 14–18, 10–25, 22–15
	Pts: Davidovac 18; Rebs: Lessort 6 Asts: Lessort 4 PIR: Davidovac 25	Boxscore	Pts: Muhammed 25; Rebs: Melli 7 Asts: Gudurić 5 PIR: Muhammed 28	Arena: Kombank Arena; Attendance: 4,849; Referees: Emilio Pérez Pizarro (ESP), Spiros Gkontas (GRE), Amit Balak (ISR)

29 March 2018 29.	Khimki (Russia)	64–73	(Turkey) Fenerbahçe Doğuş	Moscow
17:45	Scoring by quarter: 18–20, 20–17, 15–22, 11–14
	Pts: Shved 19; Rebs: Gill 8 Asts: Shved 8 PIR: Gill 20	Boxscore	Pts: Wanamaker 14; Rebs: Melli 10; Asts: Wanamaker 4 PIR: Melli 27	Arena: Khimki Basketball Center; Attendance: 5,113; Referees: Juan Carlos García González (ESP), Fernando Rocha (POR), Tomislav Hordov (CRO)

5 April 2018 30.	Fenerbahçe Doğuş (Turkey)	91–99(OT)	(Spain) Unicaja Málaga	Istanbul
19:15	Scoring by quarter: 14–22, 22–25, 15–12, 32–24, Overtime: 8–16
	Pts: Sloukas 26; Rebs: Datome 6 Asts: Sloukas 7 PIR: Sloukas 33	Boxscore	Pts: Nedović 31; Rebs: Brooks 6 Asts: Nedović 8 PIR: Nedović 36	Arena: Ülker Sports Arena; Attendance: 10,012; Referees: Sreten Radović (CRO), Piotr Pastusiak (POL), David Romano (ISR)

==== Playoffs ====
===== Quarterfinals =====
18 April 2018 1	Fenerbahçe Doğuş (Turkey)	82–73	(Spain) Kirolbet Baskonia	Istanbul
19:15	Scoring by quarter: 21–11, 22–15, 22–26, 17–21
	Pts: Wanamaker 16; Rebs: Veselý 8 Asts: Sloukas 11; PIR: Sloukas 22	Boxscore	Pts: Shengelia 16; Rebs: Beaubois, Shengelia 6 Asts: Beaubois, Huertas 3 PIR: Shengelia 19	Arena: Ülker Sports Arena; Attendance: 12,954; Referees: Saša Pukl (SLO), Borys Ryzhyk (UKR), Carmelo Paternicò (ITA)

20 April 2018 2	Fenerbahçe Doğuş (Turkey)	95–89	(Spain) Kirolbet Baskonia	Istanbul
19:45	Scoring by quarter: 25–23, 28–26, 18–19, 24–21
	Pts: Wanamaker 19; Rebs: Veselý 6 Asts: Sloukas 6 PIR: Wanamaker 31	Boxscore	Pts: Janning 17; Rebs: Poirier 7 Asts: Shengelia 5 PIR: Poirier 21	Arena: Ülker Sports Arena; Attendance: 12,987; Referees: Luigi Lamonica (ITA), Elias Koromilas (GRE), Fernando Rocha (POR)

24 April 2018 3	Kirolbet Baskonia (Spain)	88–83	(Turkey) Fenerbahçe Doğuş	Vitoria-Gasteiz
21:00	Scoring by quarter: 19–20, 28–18, 20–28, 21–17
	Pts: Beaubois 21; Rebs: Shengelia 10; Asts: Huertas 7 PIR: Beaubois 24	Boxscore	Pts: Veselý 17; Rebs: Veselý 10; Asts: Sloukas 11; PIR: Sloukas, Veselý 23	Arena: Fernando Buesa Arena; Attendance: 12,055; Referees: Sreten Radović (CRO), Saša Pukl (SLO), Oļegs Latiševs (LAT)

26 April 2018 4	Kirolbet Baskonia (Spain)	83–92	(Turkey) Fenerbahçe Doğuş	Vitoria-Gasteiz
21:00	Scoring by quarter: 19–25, 13–23, 30–24, 21–20
	Pts: Poirier 14; Rebs: Voigtmann 7 Asts: Huertas 6 PIR: Poirier, Voigtmann 17	Boxscore	Pts: Gudurić 22; Rebs: Veselý 6 Asts: Sloukas 8 PIR: Gudurić, Melli 26	Arena: Fernando Buesa Arena; Attendance: 11,548; Referees: Luigi Lamonica (ITA), Matej Boltauzer (SLO), Piotr Pastusiak (POL)

==== Final Four ====
===== Semifinal =====
18 May 2018	Fenerbahçe Doğuş (Turkey)	76–67	(Lithuania) Žalgiris Kaunas	Belgrade
18:00 UTC+02:00	Scoring by quarter: 19–13, 20–20, 15–17, 22–17
	Pts: Muhammed 19; Rebs: Düverioğlu 5 Asts: Melli 6 PIR: Muhammed 18	Boxscore	Pts: Pangos 16; Rebs: Davies 11; Asts: Micić, Pangos 4 PIR: Davies 21	Arena: Štark Arena; Attendance: 16,967; Referees: Daniel Hierrezuelo (ESP), Sreten Radović (CRO), Oļegs Latiševs (LAT)

===== Final =====
20 May 2018	Real Madrid (Spain)	85–80	(Turkey) Fenerbahçe Doğuş	Belgrade
20:00 UTC+02:00	Scoring by quarter: 21–17, 17–23, 25–15, 22–25
	Pts: Causeur 17; Rebs: three players 5 Asts: Dončić 4 PIR: Causeur 21	Boxscore	Pts: Melli 28; Rebs: Melli 6 Asts: Wanamaker 5 PIR: Melli 27	Arena: Štark Arena; Attendance: 16,967; Referees: Luigi Lamonica (ITA), Borys Ryzhyk (UKR), Oļegs Latiševs (LAT)

Starters:			Pts	Reb	Ast
PG	11	(Argentina) Facundo Campazzo	0	1	0
SG	7	(Slovenia) Luka Dončić	15	3	4
SF	1	(France) Fabien Causeur	17	2	2
PF	9	(Spain) Felipe Reyes	6	3	0
C	14	(Mexico) Gustavo Ayón	4	2	1
Reserves:					
PF	3	(Slovenia) Anthony Randolph	3	1	0
SF	5	(Spain) Rudy Fernández	5	5	3
SG	20	(Azerbaijan) Jaycee Carroll	9	0	0
C	22	(Cape Verde) Edy Tavares	8	5	2
PG	23	(Spain) Sergio Llull	5	0	2
PF	33	(United States) Trey Thompkins	10	5	1
SF	44	(Sweden) Jeffery Taylor	3	3	1
Head coach:
(Spanish Basketball Federation) Pablo Laso

Real Madrid	Fenerbahçe

Starters:			Pts	Reb	Ast
PG	11	(United States) Brad Wanamaker	14	5	5
SG	23	(Serbia) Marko Gudurić	0	1	2
SF	33	(Serbia) Nikola Kalinić	7	3	1
PF	24	(Czech Republic) Jan Veselý	3	5	2
C	44	(Jordan) Ahmet Düverioğlu	8	1	0
Reserves:					
PF	1	(United States) Jason Thompson	0	0	0
PF	4	(Italy) Nicolò Melli	28	6	1
SG	10	(Turkey) Melih Mahmutoğlu	DNP		
PG	16	(Greece) Kostas Sloukas	7	1	4
SF	21	(United States) James Nunnally	0	0	1
PG	35	(Turkey) Ali Muhammed	7	2	1
SF	70	(Italy) Luigi Datome	6	2	0
Head coach:
(Basketball Federation of Serbia) Željko Obradović

==== Individual awards ====
Euroleague MVP of the Round

- (United States) Brad Wanamaker – Regular Season, Round 19
- (United States) Brad Wanamaker – Regular Season, Round 20
- (Czech Republic) Jan Veselý – Regular Season, Round 22

Magic Moment

- (Czech Republic) Jan Veselý
