= Josep Maria Izquierdo =

Spanish basketball coach

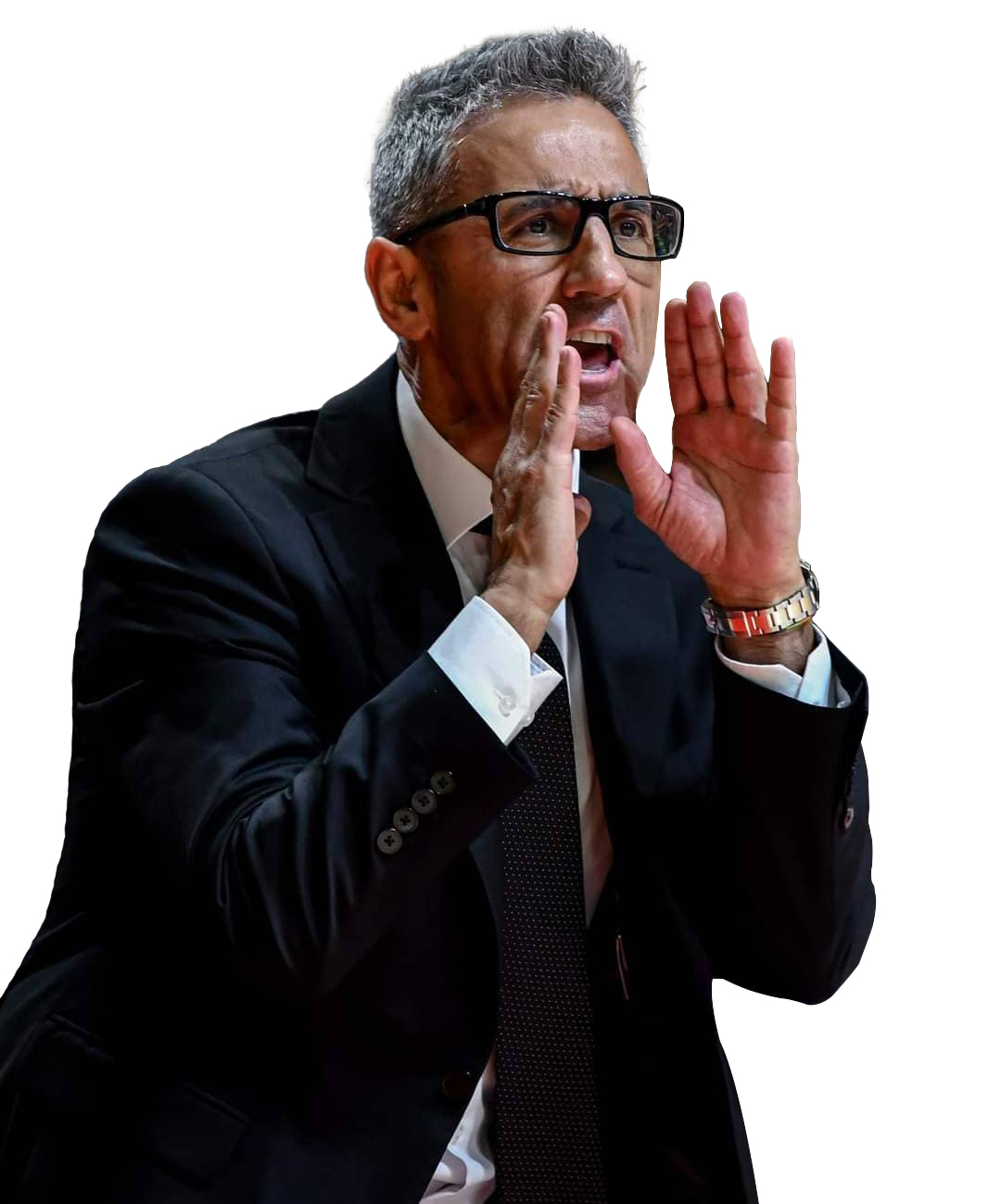

Panathinaikos
- Position: Assistant coach
- League: Greek Basketball League; EuroLeague

Personal information
- Born: May 15, 1967 (age 59) Badalona, Spain
- Coaching career: 1988–present

Career history

Coaching
- 1988–1999: Joventut Badalona (assistant)
- 1999–2001: Joventut Badalona
- 2001–2002: Melilla
- 2002–2003: Real Madrid (assistant)
- 2003–2006: Melilla
- 2006–2007: Breogán
- 2007–2008: L'Hospitalet
- 2009: Fundación Adepal Alcázar
- 2009–2010: Prat Joventut
- 2013–2020: Fenerbahçe (assistant)
- 2021–2025: Partizan (assistant)
- 2026–present: Panathinaikos (assistant)

Career highlights
- As assistant coach: 2× EuroLeague champion (1994, 2017); FIBA Korać Cup champion (1990); 2× Liga ACB champion (1991, 1992); 4× Turkish Super League champion (2014, 2016–2018); 2× ABA League champion (2023, 2025); Serbian League champion (2025); Copa del Rey winner (1997); 3× Turkish Cup winner (2016, 2019, 2020); 3× Turkish President's Cup winner (2013, 2016, 2017)

Josep Maria Izquierdo Ibáñez (born May 15, 1967) is a Spanish professional basketball coach who is currently an assistant coach for Panathinaikos of the Greek Basketball League (GBL) and the EuroLeague.

== Coaching career ==
In 2013, Fenerbahçe head coach Željko Obradović added Izquierdo to his coaching staff as an assistant. Izquierdo left Fenerbahçe following the departure of Obradović in 2020.

In August 2021, Izquierdo was named an assistant coach for Serbian team Partizan under Željko Obradović.
