= Jan Veselý =

Czech basketball player (born 1990)

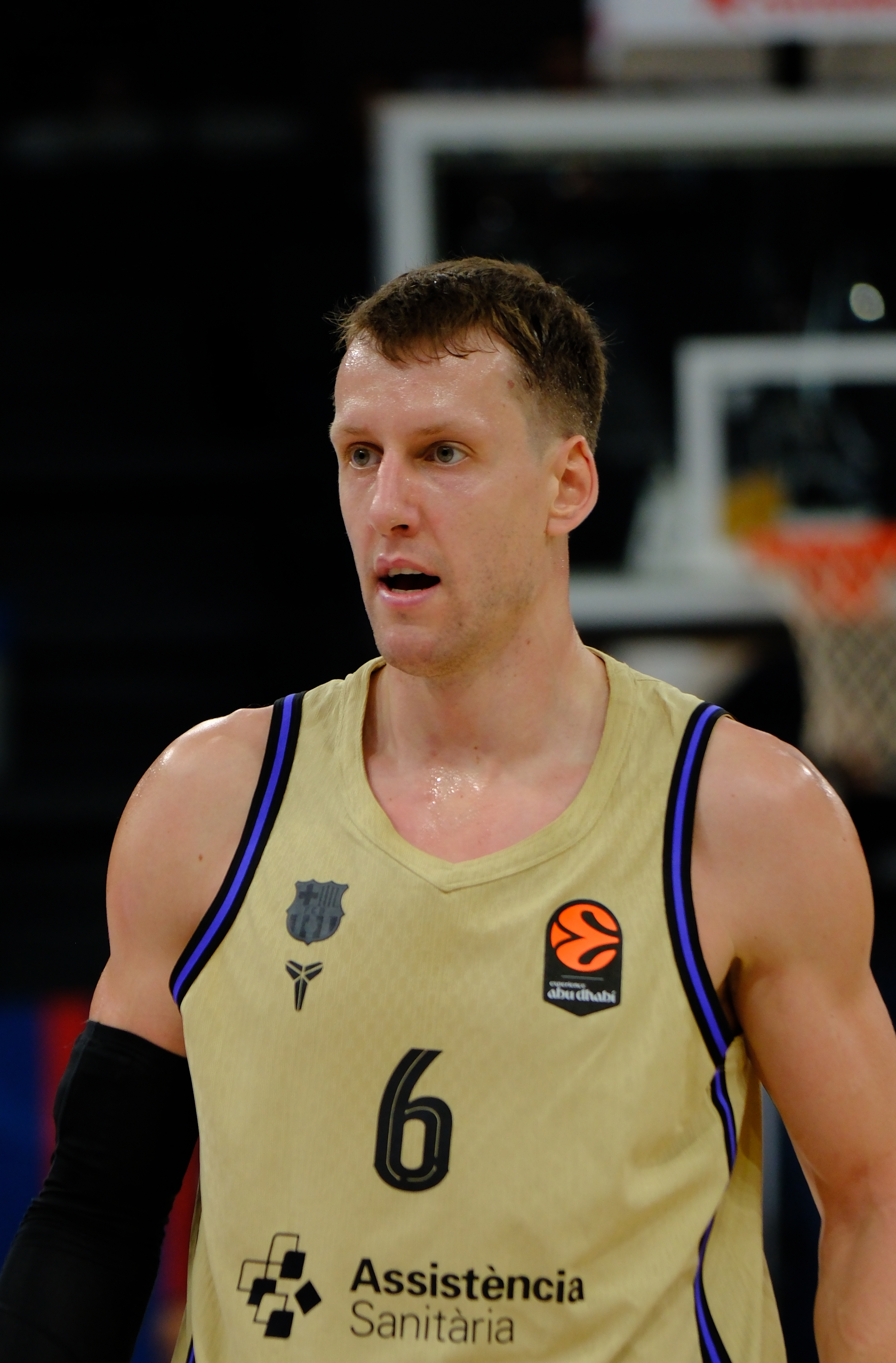
- Veselý with FC Barcelona in 2025

Personal information
- Born: 24 April 1990 (age 36) Ostrava, Czechoslovakia
- Listed height: 6 ft 11 in (2.11 m)
- Listed weight: 243 lb (110 kg)

Career information
- NBA draft: 2011: 1st round, 6th overall pick
- Drafted by: Washington Wizards
- Playing career: 2007–2026
- Position: Center / power forward
- Number: 24, 6

Career history
- 2007–2008: Geoplin Slovan
- 2008–2011: Partizan
- 2011–2014: Washington Wizards
- 2014: Denver Nuggets
- 2014–2022: Fenerbahçe
- 2022–2026: FC Barcelona

Career highlights
- EuroLeague champion (2017); EuroLeague MVP (2019); 3× All-EuroLeague First Team (2016, 2018, 2019); Liga ACB champion (2023); 4× Turkish Super League champion (2016–2018, 2022); 3× ABA League champion (2009–2011); 3× Serbian League champion (2009–2011); 3× Turkish Cup winner (2016, 2019, 2020); 3× Serbian Cup winner (2009–2011); 2× Turkish Super Cup winner (2016, 2017); Turkish Super League Finals MVP (2022); 3× Czech Player of the Year (2012, 2016, 2017); 2× Turkish All-Star (2015, 2016); FIBA European Young Player of the Year (2010)
- Stats at NBA.com
- Stats at Basketball Reference

Jan Veselý (born 24 April 1990) is a Czech former professional basketball player. Standing at 2.10 m (6 ft 10 1/2 in), he played both the power forward and center positions. He was selected sixth overall in the 2011 NBA draft by the Washington Wizards. Veselý is a Three-time All-EuroLeague First Team selection.

== Professional career ==
=== Early years ===
Veselý began playing basketball with the youth clubs of Příbor and BK Snakes Ostrava in the Czech Republic. In 2007, he moved to Slovenia and signed with Geoplin Slovan.

=== Partizan (2008–2011) ===
In April 2008, he signed a multi-year deal with Serbian club Partizan. He won nine club trophies with the club, and also reached the 2009–10 Euroleague Final Four. In 2010, Veselý was presented the FIBA Europe Young Men's Player of the Year Award.

=== Washington Wizards (2011–2014) ===
Veselý was drafted in the first round by the Washington Wizards with the sixth overall pick in the 2011 NBA draft. After Flip Saunders was fired, Veselý saw more minutes on the court under new coach Randy Wittman, who also implored him to be more aggressive offensively. On April 9th, 2012, he recorded his first double-double, finishing the game with 11 points and 11 rebounds in a win over the Charlotte Bobcats. Veselý continued his success over the Bobcats on April 23rd, when he posted a career-high 16 points on 8-8 shooting. He averaged 4.7 points and 4.4 rebounds in his first NBA season. However, in his second season with the Wizards, he averaged just 2.5 points and 2.4 rebounds per game, while shooting just 31% from the free-throw line. He continued to struggle in his third year with the Wizards. Playing in 33 games, he averaged 3.2 points and 3.4 rebounds per game, and shot only 27% from the free-throw line.

=== Denver Nuggets (2014) ===
On 20 February 2014, Veselý was traded to the Denver Nuggets in a three-team trade. Until the end of the season, he appeared in 21 games, averaging 4.4 points, 3.7 rebounds and a career-high 1.3 steals per game.

=== Fenerbahçe (2014–2022) ===
On 5 August 2014, Veselý signed a two-year deal with the Turkish club Fenerbahçe.

Fenerbahçe advanced to the 2015 Euroleague Final Four, the first time in the team's history that they played in a EuroLeague Final Four. On 15 May 2015, however, they lost in the EuroLeague semifinal game to Real Madrid, by a score of 87–96. Veselý contributed with 20 points and 6 rebounds in the semifinal game. Eventually, Fenerbahçe finished in 4th place in the EuroLeague, after losing in the third-place game to CSKA Moscow, by a score of 80–86. Over 29 EuroLeague games played in the 2014–15 season, he averaged a career-high 11.2 points and 5.4 rebounds per game, on 63.3% shooting from the field.

He was the EuroLeague's 2015–16 season selection as the MVP for the month of January. On 21 March 2016, it was announced that he would be sidelined for up to six weeks, due to an Achilles tendon injury, which caused him to miss the entire EuroLeague playoffs against Real Madrid. He'd make his return on 13 May 2016, in the 2016 Final Four match-up against Laboral Kutxa. In his return, he'd record 14 points, in an 88–77 overtime victory against them, while also being announced as a part of the All-EuroLeague First Team, for his performances in the 2015–16 Euroleague season, before his Achilles tendon injury.

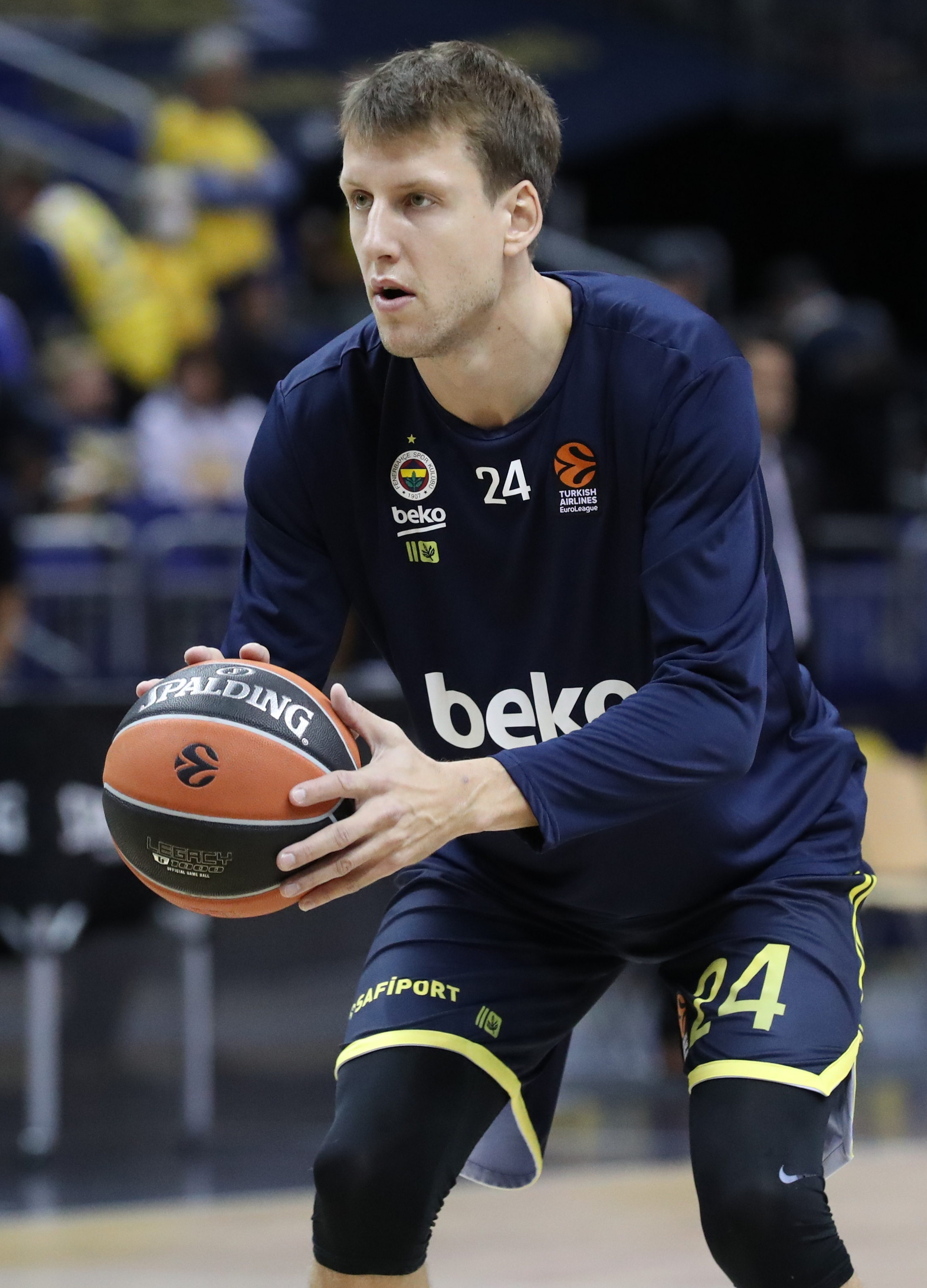
Veselý with Fenerbahçe in 2021

On 9 July 2016, Veselý signed a new three-year contract with Fenerbahçe, with NBA opt-out clauses every summer. In 2017, Fenerbahçe defeated Olympiakos 80–64 in the Euroleague final in Istanbul, becoming the champion for the first time in its history and Veselý became one of the most important parts of that Fenerbahçe basketball team. In May 2018, he was named the All-EuroLeague First Team for the 2017–18 season, his second career nomination. In 2017–18 EuroLeague, Fenerbahçe made it to the 2018 EuroLeague Final Four, its fourth consecutive Final Four appearance. Eventually, they lost to Real Madrid with 80–85 in the final game. Over 34 EuroLeague games, he averaged career-highs of 12.5 points and 1.6 assists, while also having 5.1 rebounds per game.

On 18 February 2019, Veselý signed a three-year contract extension with Fenerbahçe. On 9 May 2019, Veselý was once again named to the All-EuroLeague First Team. Later that month, Veselý was named the EuroLeague MVP for 2018–19 EuroLeague season.

On 21 June 2022, Veselý officially parted ways with the Turkish club after eight seasons.

=== FC Barcelona (2022–2026) ===
On 1 July 2022, Veselý signed a three-year deal with FC Barcelona of the Spanish Liga ACB and the EuroLeague. In April 2023, he became the EuroLeague's all-time leader in 2-pointers made, with 1,293 shots made in total. In his first season with the Catalans, Veselý won the 2022–23 Liga ACB and helped the team reach the 2023 EuroLeague Final Four.

On May 12, 2026, Veselý announced his retirement from professional basketball at the end of the 2025–26 season. At the time of the announcement, he was among the EuroLeague's statistical leaders in several categories.

== National team career ==
Veselý has been a member of the senior men's Czech Republic national basketball team, having previously played for the Czech Republic's junior national teams. He has played at the EuroBasket 2013 and the EuroBasket 2015.

On 31 July 2021, Veselý scored 13 points in a loss to the United States men's national basketball team at the 2020 Summer Olympics in Tokyo, Japan.

== Playing style ==
Prior to the 2011 NBA Draft, Veselý was compared to European NBA superstars Dirk Nowitzki and Andrei Kirilenko due to his speed and court movement. Veselý himself compared his game to Nowitzki's in interviews. He was also compared to Blake Griffin due to his athleticism.

While at the start of his career he was known for his size, athleticism, physicality and his ability to finish close to the rim, Veselý developed his mid-range shot into a trademark of his game over the years. By the latter years of his career, Veselý also added three-point shooting to his skillset.

=== Free Throw Struggles and Turnaround ===
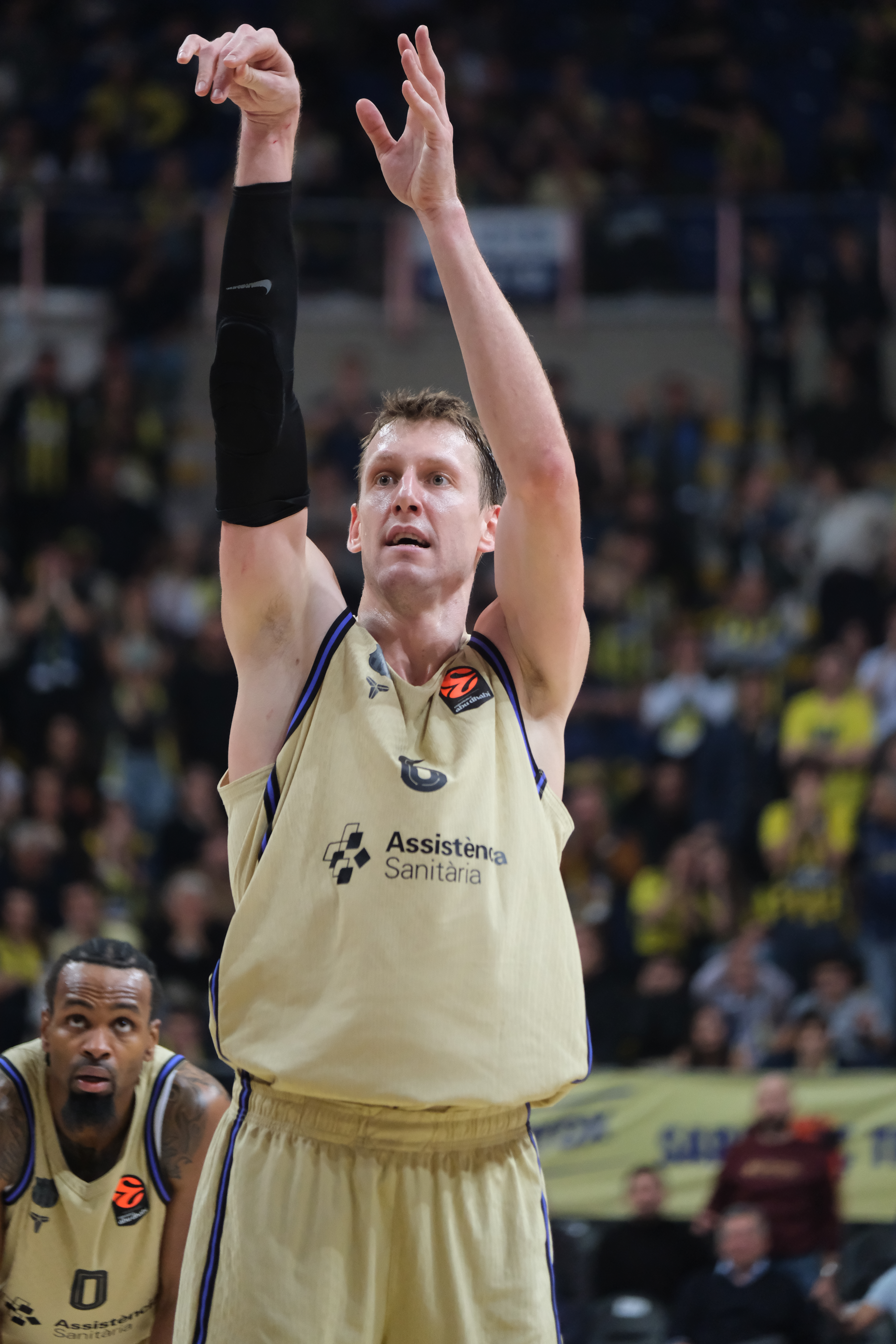
Veselý shooting a free throw in 2025

One of the notable story lines of Vesely's career was his turnaround in free throw shooting. In his first year in the NBA, he memorably airballed his first free throw attempt, then went on to shoot 53% for the season, in a league where the average was 75%. In his second year he shot 31%, and in his third year 27%. He admitted that the free throw problems were "a mental thing" and a lack of confidence. His fear of shooting free throws was known to his teammates, and in one instance teammate Jordan Crawford attempted to shoot Vesely's free throws for him when Vesely had been fouled. On discovering the switch, the referee took away the point that Crawford had made and gave the ball to Vesely, who then missed both free throws. His career 40.8% average in the NBA places him among some of the worst free throw shooters of all time.

On returning to Europe, Vesely continued to shoot less than 50% from the free throw line in EuroLeague play, and in the 2016 Final only made 1 from 10 free throws. His coach of the time, Fenerbahçe coach Željko Obradović, told him: "Even if you shoot 0 from 20 right now... I won’t care. The most important thing is for you to understand that it’s a completely psychological thing. That you need to go to the line and shoot as always you do because your form is very good." From that low point Vesely steadily gained confidence and improved.

Starting from the 2017–18 season, he almost consistently averaged over 70% shooting from the free throws. In three years playing for FC Barcelona between 2022 and 2025, he averaged 78.1%. His transformation of what was one of the weakest parts of his game into one of his strengths was cited as an inspiration to teammates.

== Career statistics ==
Legend
GP	Games played	GS	Games started	MPG	Minutes per game
FG%	Field-goal percentage	3P%	3-point field-goal percentage	FT%	Free-throw percentage
RPG	Rebounds per game	APG	Assists per game	SPG	Steals per game
BPG	Blocks per game	PPG	Points per game	PIR	Performance index rating
**Bold**	Career high

=== NBA ===
Year	Team	GP	GS	MPG	FG%	3P%	FT%	RPG	APG	SPG	BPG	PPG
2011–12	Washington	**57**	**20**	**18.9**	**.537**	.000	**.532**	**4.4**	**.8**	.7	.6	**4.7**
2012–13	Washington	51	4	11.8	.500	.000	.308	2.4	.5	.3	.3	2.5
2013–14	Washington	33	1	14.2	.522	—	.267	3.4	.3	.6	**.8**	3.2
2013–14	Denver	21	0	14.6	.506	—	.423	3.7	.5	**1.3**	**.8**	4.4
Career		162	25	15.2	.521	.000	.408	3.5	.6	.7	.5	3.6

=== EuroLeague ===
†	Denotes season in which Veselý won the EuroLeague
*	Led the league

Year	Team	GP	GS	MPG	FG%	3P%	FT%	RPG	APG	SPG	BPG	PPG	PIR
2008–09	Partizan	17	13	19.9	.517	.056	.538	3.4	.4	.5	.3	4.8	4.2
2009–10	Partizan	22*	22*	24.8	.550	.400	.625	4.9	1.4	.7	.5	8.4	9.5
2010–11	Partizan	15	14	27.0	.536	.357	.444	3.6	1.1	1.3	.9	10.1	10.3
2014–15	Fenerbahçe	29	9	21.9	.633	.000	.491	5.4	.8	.8	**1.0**	11.2	13.6
2015–16	Fenerbahçe	23	17	27.4	.623	**.667**	.453	**6.8**	1.6	.8	**1.0**	11.9	15.6
2016–17†	Fenerbahçe	34	26	24.5	.563	.000	.557	4.5	1.4	1.0	.6	9.6	11.7
2017–18	Fenerbahçe	34	26	26.6	.609	—	.707	5.1	1.6	.9	.7	12.5	16.0
2018–19	Fenerbahçe	31	11	25.1	.651	.200	.787	4.7	2.4	**1.4**	.5	12.3	17.6
2019–20	Fenerbahçe	18	10	25.4	.591	.000	.521	4.2	1.6	1.3	.7	8.6	12.1
2020–21	Fenerbahçe	31	**31**	28.1	**.668**	.000	.766	5.3	**2.7**	.9	.6	13.1	18.0
2021–22	Fenerbahçe	22	20	**28.5**	.617	.333	.733	6.0	2.5	1.1	.4	**13.6**	**18.2**
2022–23	Barcelona	**38**	18	20.0	.577	.000	.791	4.0	1.5	.8	.3	9.3	11.6
2023–24	Barcelona	**38**	**37**	21.9	.610	.286	**.798**	4.3	1.3	1.0	.5	12.3	14.9
2024–25	Barcelona	24	13	21.1	.559	.500	.761	3.6	1.9	1.1	.5	9.0	11.6
2025–26	Barcelona	**38**	24	21.2	.583	.294	.773	3.3	1.4	.9	.2	8.7	9.4
Career		414	291	24.0	.6.15	.302	.660	4.6	1.6	1.0	.5	10.6	13.2

=== Domestic leagues ===
Year	Team	League	GP	MPG	FG%	3P%	FT%	RPG	APG	SPG	BPG	PPG
2007–08	(Slovenia) Slovan	1. SKL	22	8.7	.592	.313	.594	2.2	.3	.4	.1	4.9
2007–08	(Slovenia) Slovan	ABA	21	10.8	.554	.375	.667	1.6	.4	.3	.3	5.3
2008–09	(Serbia) Partizan	KLS	6	17.5	.500	.000	.667	2.2	1.3	.8	1.0	3.0
2008–09	(Serbia) Partizan	ABA	24	16.0	.520	.158	.683	3.1	1.1	.7	.7	4.5
2009–10	(Serbia) Partizan	KLS	18	19.4	.582	.214	.733	2.6	1.4	2.1	.5	9.9
2009–10	(Serbia) Partizan	ABA	26	21.5	.570	.306	.643	3.5	1.0	1.0	.5	8.4
2010–11	(Serbia) Partizan	KLS	19	21.7	.579	.333	.400	5.3	1.5	.5	.7	11.8
2010–11	(Serbia) Partizan	ABA	24	23.7	.607	.289	.554	4.3	1.4	1.2	.7	10.4
2014–15	(Turkey) Fenerbahçe	TBSL	36	21.8	.590	.000	.621	5.2	1.0	1.1	1.3	10.6
2015–16	(Turkey) Fenerbahçe	TBSL	36	24.3	.591	.000	.677	6.1	1.5	.7	.9	12.0
2016–17	(Turkey) Fenerbahçe	TBSL	33	23.9	.704	.000	.743	5.4	1.5	1.0	.8	11.4
2017–18	(Turkey) Fenerbahçe	TBSL	29	20.7	.639	.000	.727	4.0	1.8	1.0	.5	10.5
2018–19	(Turkey) Fenerbahçe	TBSL	12	25.1	.692	.000	.792	6.2	2.2	1.1	.5	12.2
2019–20	(Turkey) Fenerbahçe	TBSL	6	25.1	.517	—	.900	4.3	1.8	1.7	.3	6.5
2020–21	(Turkey) Fenerbahçe	TBSL	25	24.1	.601	.000	.731	5.2	2.8	1.2	.7	9.8
2021–22	(Turkey) Fenerbahçe	TBSL	24	25.3	.667	.125	.686	6.2	2.9	1.5	.7	10.7
2022–23	(Spain) Barcelona	ACB	39	18.4	.628	.333	.662	3.8	1.4	.7	.1	9.3
2023–24	(Spain) Barcelona	ACB	31	19.1	.579	.429	.724	3.8	1.5	.4	.5	9.0

== Awards and accomplishments ==
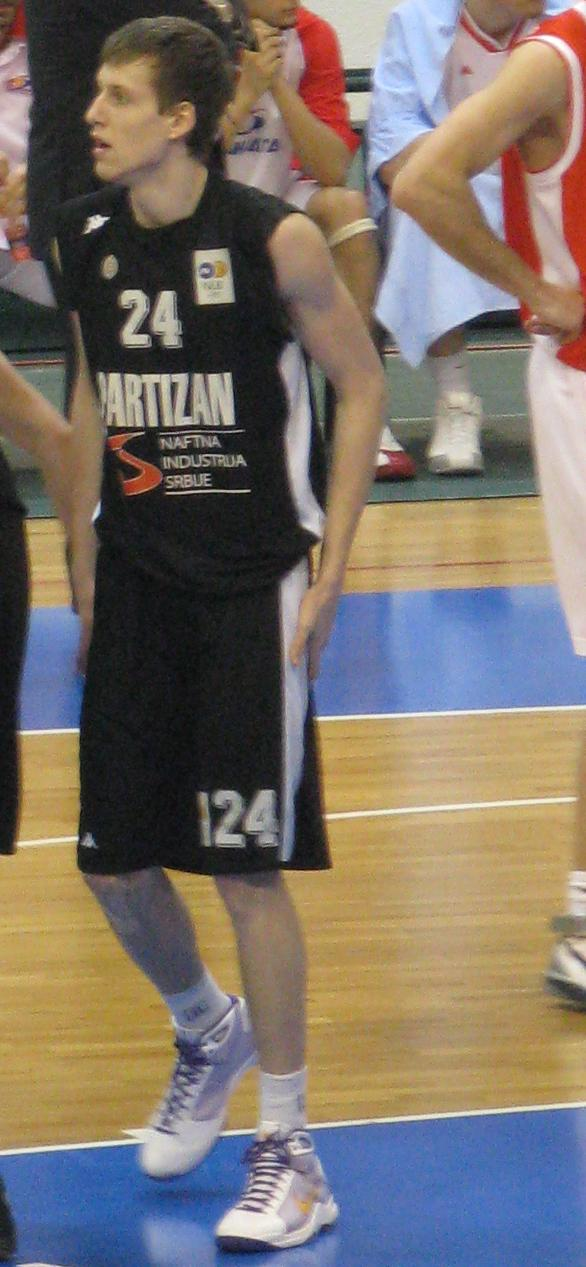
Veselý with Partizan in the Adriatic League in February 2009.

Club

- Adriatic League with Partizan for 2009, 2010, 2011
- (Serbia) Serbian Basketball League with Partizan for 2009, 2010, 2011
- (Serbia) Serbian Cup with Partizan for 2009, 2010, 2011
- (Europe) EuroLeague with Fenerbahçe for 2016–17
- (Europe) EuroLeague Final Four with Fenerbahçe for 2015, 2016, 2017, 2018, 2019
- (Turkey) Turkish Basketball League with Fenerbahçe for 2015–16, 2016–17, 2017–18, 2021–22
- (Turkey) Turkish Cup with Fenerbahçe for 2016, 2019, 2020
- (Turkey) Turkish Super Cup with Fenerbahçe for 2016, 2017
- (Spain) Spanish Basketball League with Barcelona for 2022–23

Individual

- Europe Young Men's Player of the Year with Partizan for 2010
- (Europe) EuroLeague Basketball 2010–20 All-Decade Team with Fenerbahçe
- (Europe) EuroLeague Season MVP with Fenerbahçe for 2018–19
- (Europe) All-EuroLeague First Team with Fenerbahçe for 2015–16, 2017–18, 2018–19
- (Europe) EuroLeague MVP of the Month with Fenerbahçe for 2015–16 January, 2018–19 December, 2020–21 January
- (Europe) EuroLeague Magic Moment of the Season with Fenerbahçe for 2017–18 with an alley-oop dunk over Brandon Davies, 2018–19 with an alley-oop dunk
- (Turkey) Turkish Basketball League Finals MVP with Fenerbahçe for 2021–22
- (Turkey) Turkish Basketball League All-star with Fenerbahçe for 2015, 2016

== Personal life ==
Veselý was born on 24 April 1990 in Ostrava (Czechoslovakia then, Czech Republic now). His father, Jan, is a former basketball player, and his mother a former volleyball player. Veselý's younger sister is a basketball player. Reportedly, he is fluent in Czech, Slovenian, Serbian and English.

Veselý was a favorite of the Partizan supporters. He stated he was "surprised by his popularity in Serbia, as no one in Czech Republic knew who he was". The Partizan supporters created two joke slogans, "When Jan plays, we are all joyful" (Serbian: "Kad Jan igra, svi smo veseli") and "We are all happy, only Jan is joyful" (Serbian: "Svi smo srećni, samo se Jan Veseli"), as his surname means "joyful" in both Czech and Serbian.

After the end of the 2010–11 season, which had been confirmed to be his last in Partizan, Veselý stated, "My first destination in Europe will always be Belgrade. Partizan, Belgrade and Serbia have given me a great opportunity, which now I can continue in another place. Serbia has become my second home". He also added he would like to wear number 24 once again and that his wish was to end his career in Partizan. Years of life in Serbia have left a permanent trace on his musical taste, as he said he likes Serbian music better than American or Czech music.

Veselý is a favorite of the Fenerbahçe supporters as well, with a slogan going "Jan Jan Vesely, let's fly Vesely, I can't help dunking!" (Turkish: "Jan Jan Vesely, uçalım Vesely, smacı basmadan duramıyorum!").

One of Vesely's notable moments as a Wizard was a kiss he shared with then-girlfriend Eva Kodouskova on live television when he was drafted on June 23, 2011. It became a minor Internet sensation, and three years later the Washington Post referred to "The Kiss" as "the most memorable moment of Vesely's time" in Washington.

== See also ==
- List of foreign basketball players in Serbia
- List of NBA drafted players from Serbia
