= Kostas Sloukas =

Greek basketball player (born 1990)

Kostas Sloukas Κωνσταντίνος Σλούκας
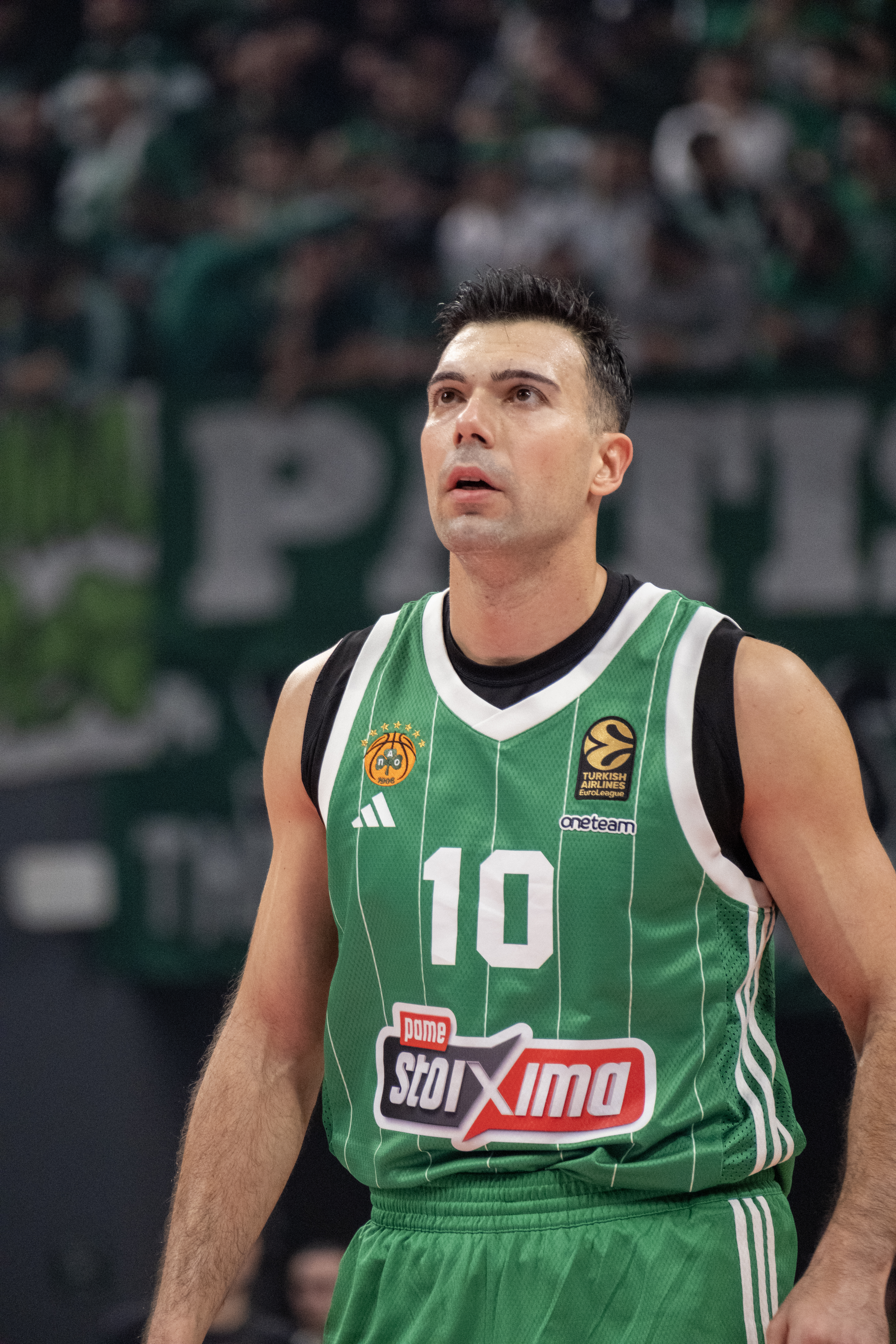
- Sloukas with Panathinaikos in 2025

No. 10 – Panathinaikos
- Position: Point guard / shooting guard
- League: Greek Basketball League; EuroLeague

Personal information
- Born: 15 January 1990 (age 36) Thessaloniki, Greece
- Listed height: 1.90 m (6 ft 3 in)
- Listed weight: 90 kg (198 lb)

Career information
- NBA draft: 2012: undrafted
- Playing career: 2008–present

Career history
- 2008–2015: Olympiacos
- 2010–2011: →Aris Thessaloniki
- 2015–2020: Fenerbahçe
- 2020–2023: Olympiacos
- 2023–present: Panathinaikos

Career highlights
- 4× EuroLeague champion (2012, 2013, 2017, 2024); EuroLeague Final Four MVP (2024); All-EuroLeague First Team (2019); 2× All-EuroLeague Second Team (2022, 2024); EuroLeague 25th Anniversary Team (2025); EuroLeague 50–40–90 club (2019); FIBA Intercontinental Cup champion (2013); 5× Greek League champion (2012, 2015, 2022–2024); 5× Greek Cup winner (2010, 2022, 2023, 2025, 2026); Greek Super Cup winner (2022); Greek League MVP (2024); 4× All-Greek League Team (2015, 2022–2024); Greek League Best Young Player (2011); Greek Cup Finals MVP (2025); 3× Greek League All-Star (2012, 2013, 2022); 3× Τurkish Super League champion (2016–2018); 3× Turkish Cup winner (2016, 2019, 2020); 2× Turkish Super Cup winner (2016, 2017); Turkish All-Star (2017)
Medals
Event	1st	2nd	3rd
FIBA EuroBasket	0	0	1
FIBA U20 EuroBasket	1	1	0
FIBA U19 World Cup	0	1	0
FIBA U18 EuroBasket	1	1	0
Total	2	3	1
Men's basketball
Representing Greece
FIBA EuroBasket
Bronze medal – third place	2025 Cyprus–Finland–Poland–Latvia	
FIBA U20 EuroBasket
Gold medal – first place	2009 Greece	Under-20
Silver medal – second place	2010 Croatia	Under-20
FIBA U19 World Cup
Silver medal – second place	2009 New Zealand	Under-19
FIBA U18 EuroBasket
Gold medal – first place	2008 Greece	Under-18
Silver medal – second place	2007 Spain	Under-18

Konstantinos "Kostas" Sloukas (Greek: Κωνσταντίνος Σλούκας; born 15 January 1990) is a Greek professional basketball player and the team captain for Panathinaikos of the Greek Basketball League (GBL) and the EuroLeague. He is also a regular member of the senior Greek basketball national team. A left-handed, 1.90 m (6 ft 3 in) tall combo guard, Kostas Sloukas is one of the most decorated EuroLeague players of his generation.

Sloukas has played in eight EuroLeague Finals (2012, 2013, 2015, 2016, 2017, 2018, 2023 and 2024) winning the title on four occasions (2012, 2013, 2017 and 2024). He was a member of the All-EuroLeague First Team in 2019 and a member of the All-EuroLeague Second Team in 2022 and 2024.

After lifting the EuroLeague trophy in 2024 and earning Final Four MVP honors in the process, Sloukas became just the second player in history to win the competition with three different teams, alongside Sarunas Jasikevicius.

Sloukas has been a regular member of the Hellenic national team since 2011, after winning five medals at the youth level. In 2025, he helped Greece capture a EuroBasket bronze medal.

== Early career ==
Sloukas began playing club basketball as a youth, with Megas Alexandros Thessaloniki. Then he moved to the Mandoulides School youth teams, in Thessaloniki, Greece.

== Professional career ==
=== Olympiacos Piraeus ===
Sloukas joined the Greek Basket League power Olympiacos Piraeus, in the year 2008. He then spent the 2008–09 and 2009–10 seasons with the club. He made his debut in Greece's top-tier level Basket League, during the 2008–09 season, and made his debut in Europe's top-tier level, the EuroLeague, during the 2009–10 season. He also won the Greek Cup title with Olympiacos, in 2010.

=== Loan to Aris Thessaloniki ===
Sloukas was loaned by Olympiacos, to the Greek club Aris Thessaloniki, in 2010. While a member of Aris, he was named the Greek Basket League's Best Young Player of the Greek Basket League 2010–11 season. With Aris, he also played in Europe's second-tier level competition, the EuroCup, during the same season.

=== Back to Olympiacos ===
After spending the 2010–11 season with Aris, on loan from Olympiacos, Sloukas returned to Olympiacos for the 2011–12 season. With Olympiacos, he went on to win both the 2012 Greek League championship, and the 2012 EuroLeague championship. He then signed a 3-year contract extension with Olympiacos, in June 2012.

With Olympiacos, Sloukas also won the 2013 EuroLeague championship, and the 2013 FIBA Intercontinental Cup championship. In his last season with Olympiacos, Sloukas was selected to the Greek League Best Five team, and he also played in the 2015 EuroLeague Finals.

=== Fenerbahçe İstanbul ===
On 29 June 2015, Sloukas signed a three-year contract (with the 3rd year being optional) with the Turkish Super League club Fenerbahçe İstanbul. With Fenerbahçe, he made it to the 2016 EuroLeague Finals, and then won the 2017 EuroLeague championship. In the summer of 2017, Sloukas signed a new 3-year contract with Fenerbahçe (with the 3rd year being optional), at a salary of €1.7 million euros net income per season.

Sloukas played in his third straight EuroLeague Finals with Fenerbahçe, as the club also made it to the 2018 EuroLeague Finals, where they eventually lost to Real Madrid, by a score of 85–80. During the 2017–18 EuroLeague season, Sloukas averaged career-highs of 10 points, 2.5 rebounds, and 5.4 assists per game, in 35 games played.

As a member of Fenerbahçe, Sloukas also won three Turkish Super League championships (2016, 2017, 2018), the Turkish Cup (2016), and two Turkish President's Super Cups (2016, 2017). On 25 April 2019, Sloukas, was the star yet again for the Turkish side as he finished the game with a double-double of 25 points, 10 assists, 5 rebounds, and 4 steals against BC Žalgiris helping his club to win the series with an aggregate 3–1 to secure a place in the Final-4 for a fifth consecutive season. Sloukas has qualified for seven Final-4's in his career, with all seven appearances coming in the last eight seasons. On 23 July 2020, Sloukas and the Turkish club officially parted ways after five successful seasons.

=== Return to Olympiacos ===
On 24 July 2020, Sloukas signed a three-year contract with Olympiacos.

On 12 August 2020, it was announced by the Euroleague that he was a member of the top10 (team) of Olympiacos in the decade 2010–2020, being fifth in the public vote with a percentage of 79.33%. On 16 August 2020, it was announced by the Euroleague that he was a member of the top ten (team) and Fenerbahce in the decade 2010–2020, being fourth in the public vote with 84.78%.

On 18 December 2020, he became the eighth player in Euroleague history to exceed 1,000 assists. In the 2020–2021 season, he finished with Olympiakos in twelfth place. In the 2021–2022, he became the youngest player (31 years and 342 days old) in Euroleague history with 200+ wins. On 27 January 2022, he completed 300 Euroleague appearances, becoming the tenth athlete to achieve this feat. On 29 January, against AEK for the Greek Championship, he set three individual career records. He had 23 points (4/6 two points, 4/7 three points, 3/4 shots) which constitute his top performance in A1. He also had 11 assists (individual record draw) and 37 points in the rating system which is also an individual record. On 20 February, he won the Greek Cup, defeating Panathinaikos 81–73 in the final. In addition Olympiacos achieved to qualify to the Play-Off Round of EuroLeague by finishing 2nd in the Regular Season. After facing Monaco in a best-of-five series, Olympiacos qualified to the Final Four with 3-2 wins, 5 years after team's last participate.

On 6 July 2023, after a week of heavy negotiating, Sloukas informed Olympiacos that he would not be renewing his contract with the club, becoming a free agent once more. Sloukas was mainly concerned about the tactical playing style of the team and had clashed with coach Georgios Bartzokas throughout their shared tenure.

=== Panathinaikos ===
On 8 July 2023, Sloukas signed a lucrative three‑year contract with Panathinaikos, joining the arch‑rival of Olympiacos B.C. and once again shifting the balance of power in Greek basketball and the EuroLeague. He was named team captain ahead of the season by coach Ergin Ataman.

In his very first season with Panathinaikos, Sloukas played a defining role as the club captured the 2023–24 EuroLeague title, earning Final Four MVP honours after a 24‑point (6/6 FG, 4/4 3P), 2‑rebounds, 3‑assists performance in the Final vs Real Madrid. That same year the club also reclaimed the Greek League championship, and Sloukas's leadership and clutch play were repeatedly highlighted throughout the campaign.

On 4 November 2025, Sloukas signed a one‑year "carte blanche" contract extension through 2027, continuing his commitment to the club.

On 11 November 2025, during a EuroLeague game against Paris Basketball, Sloukas became the first player in EuroLeague history to surpass 10,000 total minutes played, finishing the night with 10,004 minutes in his career after logging just under 22 minutes in the contest.

On 30 January 2026, Sloukas made his 450th EuroLeague appearance, marking another milestone in his 16th season in the competition, second only then to Real Madrid's Sergio Llull (then 468).

In April 2026, Sloukas underwent knee surgery after suffering a left knee injury during training. He had a tear in the outer meniscus of his left knee.

=== Greek junior national team ===
Sloukas won the silver medal at the 2007 FIBA Europe Under-18 Championship, and the gold medal at the 2008 FIBA Europe Under-18 Championship, where he was also voted to the All-Tournament Team. He also won the silver medal at the 2009 FIBA Under-19 World Cup, and the gold medal at the 2009 FIBA Europe Under-20 Championship. At the 2010 FIBA Europe Under-20 Championship Sloukas reached another final, eventually winning a silver medal.

=== Greek senior national team ===
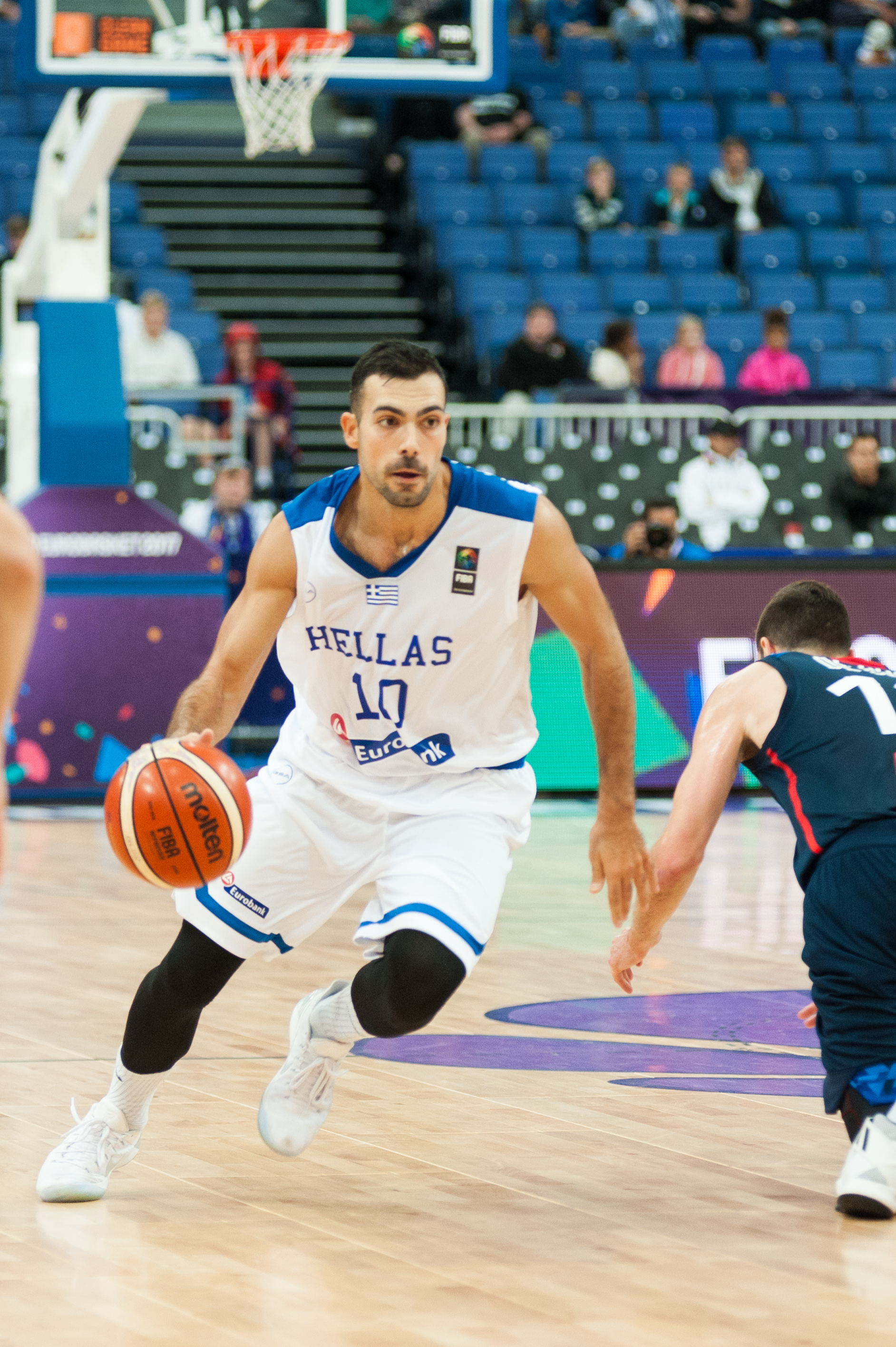
Sloukas at a national team game against France in 2017.

Sloukas joined the senior men's Greek national team in 2011. Since then, he has represented Greece at multiple major international tournaments, including EuroBasket 2011, EuroBasket 2013, the 2014 FIBA World Cup, EuroBasket 2015, EuroBasket 2017, the 2019 FIBA World Cup, and EuroBasket 2022.

In 2025, he helped Greece capture the bronze medal at EuroBasket 2025.

== Personal life ==
Sloukas is nicknamed "Slouky Luke" (pronounced Slucky Luke), or "the man who shoots and passes faster than his shadow," a wordplay on his name and the comic book character Lucky Luke.

Since June 2021, Sloukas has been married to Maria Darsinou. They have two children: a daughter, Valeria (born 2021), and a son, Giannis (born 2024).

== Career statistics ==
Legend
GP	Games played	GS	Games started	MPG	Minutes per game
FG%	Field-goal percentage	3P%	3-point field-goal percentage	FT%	Free-throw percentage
RPG	Rebounds per game	APG	Assists per game	SPG	Steals per game
BPG	Blocks per game	PPG	Points per game	PIR	Performance index rating
**Bold**	Career high

=== EuroLeague ===
†	Denotes seasons in which Sloukas won the EuroLeague

Year	Team	GP	GS	MPG	FG%	3P%	FT%	RPG	APG	SPG	BPG	PPG	PIR
2009–10	Olympiacos	1	0	5.4	.000	.000	.500	1.0	—	—	—	1.0	0.0
2011–12†	Olympiacos	15	0	14.7	.520	**.556**	.875	1.7	1.6	.7	.1	5.5	7.3
2012–13†	Olympiacos	30	0	14.5	.413	.431	.870	1.6	1.2	.4	—	5.2	5.1
2013–14	Olympiacos	28	2	19.4	.431	.377	.816	1.5	2.9	.5	**.2**	6.5	7.0
2014–15	Olympiacos	29	0	18.0	.362	.346	.868	1.9	3.1	.6	.1	6.7	8.8
2015–16	Fenerbahçe	21	7	20.0	.449	.345	.860	1.7	3.0	.3	—	6.7	8.1
2016–17†	Fenerbahçe	29	14	26.1	.445	.429	.870	2.1	4.5	.6	**.2**	9.2	9.8
2017–18	Fenerbahçe	35	10	24.8	.428	.381	.916	2.5	5.4	.6	.1	10.0	12.7
2018–19	Fenerbahçe	33	12	26.6	**.522**	.449	.934	2.2	4.8	.5	**.2**	11.6	15.2
2019–20	Fenerbahçe	25	19	**29.0**	.456	.422	.938	2.8	**6.1**	.5	.1	11.8	15.5
2020–21	Olympiacos	34	**33**	27.7	.409	.404	.922	2.4	6.0	**.8**	.0	11.0	13.4
2021–22	Olympiacos	37	1	24.9	.455	.418	.848	2.6	5.0	**.8**	.0	11.9	14.8
2022–23	Olympiacos	36	0	22.8	.440	.325	.906	2.1	5.6	.3	.1	11.0	14.7
2023–24†	Panathinaikos	34	15	26.2	.500	.415	.853	**3.2**	5.6	**.8**	.0	**12.7**	**16.1**
2024–25	Panathinaikos	**39**	2	21.7	.401	.366	**.941**	2.2	4.8	**.8**	.1	9.1	12.2
2025–26	Panathinaikos	38	6	21.2	.432	.375	.905	1.9	5.1	.7	.1	9.6	12.5
Career		464	121	22.5	.443	.395	.893	2.2	4.5	.6	.1	9.5	11.9

=== EuroCup ===
Year	Team	GP	GS	MPG	FG%	3P%	FT%	RPG	APG	SPG	BPG	PPG	PIR
2010–11	Aris Thessaloniki	11	4	18.5	.439	.450	.815	2.2	3.1	1.0	—	6.1	7.5
Career		11	4	18.5	.439	.450	.815	2.2	3.1	1.0	—	6.1	7.5

=== Domestic leagues ===
Year	Team	League	GP	MPG	FG%	3P%	FT%	RPG	APG	SPG	BPG	PPG
2008–09	(Greece) Olympiacos	HEBA A1	10	9.5	.389	.182	1.000	.2	.6	.8	—	2.2
2009–10	(Greece) Olympiacos	HEBA A1	13	12.0	.679	.692	.750	1.4	1.5	.5	—	5.2
2010–11	(Greece) Aris Thessaloniki	HEBA A1	32	24.8	.401	.306	.848	3.1	3.0	.8	.1	8.3
2011–12	(Greece) Olympiacos	HEBA A1	31	13.8	.500	.511	.868	1.3	2.0	.6	—	6.2
2012–13	(Greece) Olympiacos	GBL	34	18.4	.400	.295	.930	2.1	2.7	.8	—	5.7
2013–14	(Greece) Olympiacos	GBL	34	19.6	.471	.397	.892	1.8	2.6	.6	.1	7.3
2014–15	(Greece) Olympiacos	GBL	31	20.7	.468	.344	.744	2.0	4.5	.6	.1	8.3
2015–16	(Turkey) Fenerbahçe	TBSL	26	21.7	.513	.447	.934	1.6	3.5	.2	—	8.1
2016–17	(Turkey) Fenerbahçe	TBSL	31	21.9	.505	.383	.897	2.6	4.4	.6	.0	9.7
2017–18	(Turkey) Fenerbahçe	TBSL	27	20.3	.497	.369	.934	1.5	5.0	.6	.0	9.0
2018–19	(Turkey) Fenerbahçe	TBSL	30	27.1	.561	.455	.895	2.3	4.8	1.0	.0	11.7
2019–20	(Turkey) Fenerbahçe	TBSL	14	32.5	.416	.420	.926	2.9	6.9	1.4	.1	11.1
2021–22	(Greece) Olympiacos	GBL	29	22.8	.405	.422	.839	2.0	5.4	1.0	—	10.5
2022–23	(Greece) Olympiacos	GBL	25	20.2	.471	.436	.872	1.9	5.3	.8	—	8.3
2023–24	(Greece) Panathinaikos	GBL	25	18.4	.444	.421	.943	1.6	3.8	.6	—	8.0
2024–25	(Greece) Panathinaikos	GBL	25	19.5	.448	.395	.849	2.6	5.4	1.0	—	7.9

== Awards and accomplishments ==
=== Titles won ===
- FIBA Intercontinental Cup Champion: 2013 (with Olympiacos)
- 4× EuroLeague Champion: 2012, 2013 (with Olympiacos), 2017 (with Fenerbahçe), 2024 (with Panathinaikos)
- 3× Turkish League Champion: 2016, 2017, 2018 (with Fenerbahçe)
- 5× Greek League Champion: 2012, 2015, 2022, 2023 (with Olympiacos), 2024 (with Panathinaikos)
- 3x Turkish Cup Winner: 2016, 2019, 2020 (with Fenerbahçe)
- 5× Greek Cup Winner: 2010, 2022, 2023 (with Olympiacos), 2025, 2026 (with Panathinaikos)
- 2× Turkish Super Cup Winner: 2016, 2017 (with Fenerbahçe)
- Greek Super Cup Winner: 2022 (with Olympiacos)

=== Other honors ===
- 4× EuroLeague Finals Finalist: 2015, 2023 (with Olympiacos), 2016, 2018 (with Fenerbahçe)
- 11× EuroLeague Final Four Participation: 2010, 2012, 2013, 2015, 2022, 2023 (with Olympiacos), 2016, 2017, 2018, 2019 (with Fenerbahçe), 2024 (with Panathinaikos)
- Turkish League Finalist: 2019 (with Fenerbahçe)
- 3× Greek League Finalist: 2010, 2013, 2014, (with Olympiacos)
- 3× Greek Cup Finalist: 2012, 2013 (with Olympiacos), 2024 (with Panathinaikos)
- 2x Turkish Super Cup Finalist: 2018, 2019 (with Fenerbahçe)
- 2× Greek Super Cup Finalist: 2023, 2024 (with Panathinaikos)

=== Individual ===
- Olympiacos 2010–20 Team of Decade
- EuroLeague 25th Anniversary Team: (2025)
- EuroLeague Final Four MVP (2024)
- All-EuroLeague First Team: (2019)
- 2× All-EuroLeague Second Team: (2022, 2024)
- EuroLeague Magic Moment of the Season: (2022)
- 3× EuroLeague MVP of the Round
- 3× Eurobasket.com's All-Europe Second Team: (2022, 2023, 2024)
- Greek League MVP: (2024)
- 4× All-Greek League First Team: (2015, 2022, 2023, 2024)
- Greek Cup MVP: (2025)
- 2× Greek League All-Star: (2013, 2022)
- 2× Greek Youth All-Star Game: 3 Point Shootout winner: (2010, 2011)
- 3× Greek Youth All-Star Game: (2009–2011)
- Greek League Best Young Player: (2011)
- 2× Turkish Cup Final Eight assists leader: (2019, 2020)
- Turkish League All-Star: (2017)

=== Greek junior national team ===
- 2007 FIBA Europe Under-18 Championship: Silver
- 2008 Albert Schweitzer Under-18 World Tournament: Gold
- 2008 FIBA Europe Under-18 Championship: All-Tournament Team
- 2009 FIBA Under-19 World Cup: Silver
- 2009 FIBA Europe Under-20 Championship: Gold
- 2010 FIBA Europe Under-20 Championship: Silver
