= 2018 Turkish Basketball Cup =

Basketball Tournament

- Season: 2018
- Duration: 14–18 February
- Games played: 7
- Teams: 8

Finals
- Champions: Anadolu Efes (11th title)
- Runners-up: Tofaş

Awards
- Final MVP: (Croatia) Krunoslav Simon

The 2018 Turkish Basketball Cup (Turkish: Basketbol Erkekler Türkiye Kupası 2018) was the 33rd edition of the national cup competition for men's basketball teams in Turkey. The tournament was held from 14–18 February 2018 at the Sinan Erdem Dome in Istanbul, Turkey. Anadolu Efes won their 11th title.

== Qualified teams ==
After the first half of the 2017–18 Basketbol Süper Ligi the top eight teams qualified for the tournament. The four highest placed teams played the lowest seeded teams in the quarter-finals.

Pos	Team	Pld	W	L	PF	PA	PD	Pts	Seeding
1	Fenerbahçe Doğuş	15	13	2	1310	1081	+229	28	Seeded
2	Tofaş	15	12	3	1272	1159	+113	27	Seeded
3	Beşiktaş Sompo Japan	15	11	4	1196	1139	+57	26	Seeded
4	Eskişehir	15	10	5	1214	1197	+17	25	Seeded
5	Darüşşafaka	15	9	6	1178	1099	+79	24	Unseeded
6	Banvit	15	9	6	1167	1103	+64	24	Unseeded
7	Sakarya BB	15	9	6	1155	1133	+22	24	Unseeded
8	Anadolu Efes (Note: Anadolu Efes were conducted one point after the team left the court unauthorized during the semi-finals of the playoffs in the 2016–17 season.)	15	10	5	1213	1198	+15	24	Unseeded

Source: Basketbol Süper Ligi

== Bracket ==
Quarterfinals; February 14–15
1	Fenerbahçe	80
8	Anadolu Efes	83
4	Eskişehir	59
5	Darüşşafaka	75
2	Tofaş	80
7	Sakarya BB	78
3	Beşiktaş Sompo Japan	80
6	Banvit	63

Semifinals; February 17
8	Anadolu Efes	90
5	Darüşşafaka	76
2	Tofaş	86
3	Beşiktaş Sompo Japan	79

Final; February 18
8	Anadolu Efes	78
2	Tofaş	61

== Final ==
18 February 2018	Anadolu Efes	78–61	Tofaş	Istanbul
18:00	Scoring by quarter: 26–17, 14–15, 22–15, 16–14
Tivibuspor	Pts: McCollum 23; Rebs: Dunston, Balbay 10; Asts: Simon 7	Boxscore	Pts: Crocker 11; Rebs: Henry, Morgan 6 Asts: Crocker, Morgan 3	Arena: Sinan Erdem Dome

== See also ==
- 2017–18 Basketbol Süper Ligi
- 2017 Turkish Basketball Presidential Cup
