= EuroLeague Magic Moment of the Season =

The EuroLeague Magic Moment of the Season is the annual award for the European top-tier level EuroLeague's "most spectacular play of the season". The award is also known as the 7DAYS EuroLeague Magic Moment of the Season, for name sponsorship reasons. The award began in the 2016–17 season.

The winner of the award is selected by an online vote of the fans.

== Magic Moment winners ==
Season	Magic Moment	Winner	Club	Opponent	Ref.
2016–17	Blocked Shot	(United States) Anthony Randolph	(Spain) Real Madrid	(Spain) Barcelona	
2017–18	Alley-oop dunk	(Czech Republic) Jan Veselý	(Turkey) Fenerbahçe	(Lithuania) Žalgiris	
2018–19	Alley-oop dunk	(Czech Republic) Jan Veselý (2)	(Turkey) Fenerbahçe	(Spain) Gran Canaria	
2019–20	Poster dunk dunk	(Israel) Deni Avdija	(Israel) Maccabi Tel Aviv	(Turkey) Fenerbahçe	
2020–21	Poster dunk	(Czech Republic) Jan Veselý (3)	(Turkey) Fenerbahçe	(Russia) Zenit Saint Petersburg	
2021–22	Winning shot	(Greece) Kostas Sloukas	(Greece) Olympiacos	(Turkey) Anadolu Efes	
2022–23	Poster dunk	(Australia) Danté Exum	(Serbia) Partizan	(Greece) Olympiacos	
2023–24	Blocked Shot	(United States) Moses Wright	(Greece) Olympiacos	(Spain) Barcelona	
