= 2019 Turkish Basketball Cup =

- Season: 2019
- Duration: 13–17 February 2019
- Games played: 7
- Teams: 8

Finals
- Champions: Fenerbahçe Beko (6th title)
- Runners-up: Anadolu Efes

Awards
- Final MVP: (Italy) Luigi Datome

Statistical leaders
Points	Adrien Moerman	21.0
Rebounds	Krunoslav Simon	6.3
Assists	Kostas Sloukas	5.6

The 2019 Turkish Basketball Cup (Turkish: 2019 Basketbol Erkekler Türkiye Kupası) was the 34th edition of Turkey's top-tier level professional national domestic basketball cup competition. The tournament was held from 13 to 17 February 2019 in the Ankara Arena in Ankara, Turkey. Fenerbahçe Beko won the competition by defeating Anadolu Efes 80–70 in the final.

== Qualified teams ==
The top eight placed teams after the first half of the top-tier level Basketball Super League 2018–19 season qualified for the tournament. The four highest placed teams played the lowest seeded teams in the quarter-finals. The competition was played under a single elimination format.

Pos	Team	Pld	W	L	PF	PA	PD	Pts	Seeding
1	Fenerbahçe Beko	14	12	2	1174	1012	+162	26	Seeded
2	Anadolu Efes	14	11	3	1224	1084	+140	25	Seeded
3	Tofaş	14	9	5	1144	1083	+61	23	Seeded
4	Türk Telekom	14	9	5	1105	1102	+3	23	Seeded
5	Galatasaray Doğa Sigorta	14	8	6	1144	1096	+48	22	Unseeded
6	Beşiktaş Sompo Japan	14	8	6	1053	1043	+10	22	Unseeded
7	Gaziantep	14	8	6	981	991	−10	22	Unseeded
8	Bahçeşehir Koleji	14	7	7	1141	1126	+15	21	Unseeded

Source: Basketbol Süper Ligi

== Bracket ==
Quarterfinals; February 13–14
1	Fenerbahçe Beko	78
8	Bahçeşehir Koleji	70
4	Türk Telekom	85
5	Galatasaray Doğa Sigorta	79
2	Anadolu Efes	73
7	Gaziantep	59
3	Tofaş	83
6	Beşiktaş Sompo Japan	89

Semifinals; February 16
1	Fenerbahçe Beko	73
4	Türk Telekom	65
2	Anadolu Efes	78
6	Beşiktaş Sompo Japan	70

Final; February 17
1	Fenerbahçe Beko	80
2	Anadolu Efes	70

== Final ==
17 February 2019	Fenerbahçe	80–70	Anadolu Efes	Ankara
19:00 TRT (UTC +3)	Scoring by quarter: 16–20, 23–14, 22–23, 19–13
Tivibuspor	Pts: Datome 22; Rebs: Datome 7 Asts: Sloukas 9 PIR: Datome 28	Boxscore	Pts: Moerman 18; Rebs: Moerman 8 Asts: Simon 3 PIR: Moerman 21	Arena: Ankara Arena; Referees: Emin Moğulkoç, Yener Yılmaz, Alper Altuğ Köselerli

Starters:			Pts	Reb	Ast
PG	35	(Turkey) Ali Muhammed	5	3	2
SG	16	(Greece) Kostas Sloukas	19	0	9
SF	70	(Italy) Luigi Datome	22	7	4
PF	4	(Italy) Nicolò Melli	7	2	1
C	44	(Turkey) Ahmet Düverioğlu	6	5	0
Reserves:					
PG	1	(United States) Erick Green	3	3	1
SF	3	(Turkey) Ergi Tırpancı	DNP		
PF	5	(Turkey) Barış Hersek	DNP		
SG	10	(Turkey) Melih Mahmutoğlu	10	3	0
SF	12	(Serbia) Nikola Kalinić	8	3	3
SF	18	(Turkey) Egehan Arna	DNP		
PG	32	(Turkey) Sinan Güler	0	0	0
Head coach:
(Basketball Federation of Serbia) Željko Obradović

Fenerbahçe	Anadolu Efes

Fenerbahçe	Statistics	A. Efes
19/35 (54.3%)	2-pt field goals	19/32 (59.4%)
11/26 (42.3%)	3-pt field goals	8/25 (32%)
9/14 (64.3%)	Free throws	8/13 (61.5%)
5	Offensive rebounds	7
21	Defensive rebounds	20
26	Total rebounds	27
20	Assists	13
6	Turnovers	10
6	Steals	2
2	Blocks	3
19	Fouls	17

2019 Turkish Cup champions
Fenerbahçe
6th title

Starters:			Pts	Reb	Ast
PG	4	(Turkey) Doğuş Balbay	5	1	1
SG	44	(Croatia) Krunoslav Simon	11	6	3
PF	18	(France) Adrien Moerman	18	8	2
PG	22	(Serbia) Vasilije Micić	16	4	2
C	42	(Armenia) Bryant Dunston	15	4	2
Reserves:					
SG	1	(France) Rodrigue Beaubois	5	3	1
SG	2	(Turkey) Mustafa Kurtuldum	DNP		
PF	3	(Turkey) Yiğitcan Saybir	DNP		
SF	6	(Turkey) Metecan Birsen	0	0	1
SF	10	(Turkey) Onuralp Bitim	DNP		
C	15	(Turkey) Sertaç Şanlı	0	1	0
G	19	(Turkey) Buğrahan Tuncer	0	0	1
Head coach:
(Turkish Basketball Federation) Ergin Ataman

== Most Valuable Player ==
Player	Team	Ref.
(Italy) Luigi Datome	Fenerbahçe	

== See also ==
- 2018–19 Basketbol Süper Ligi
