= Sinan Güler =

Turkish basketball player (born 1983)

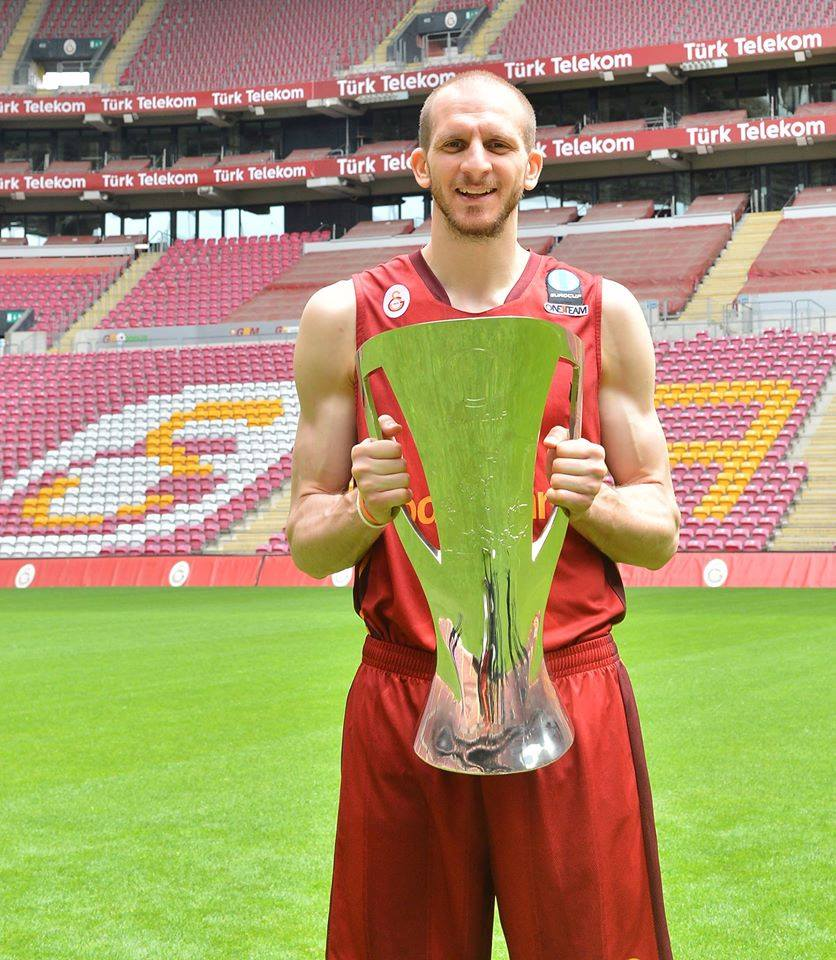
- Galatasaray S.K. (men's basketball) Captain Sinan Güler with Eurocup 2016

Personal information
- Born: 8 November 1983 (age 43) Istanbul, Turkey
- Listed height: 6 ft 3.75 in (1.92 m)
- Listed weight: 210 lb (95 kg)

Career information
- College: Salt Lake CC (2002–2004); Carroll (2004–2006)
- NBA draft: 2006: undrafted
- Playing career: 2001–2022
- Position: Shooting guard / point guard
- Number: 32, 5

Career history
- 2001–2002: Beşiktaş
- 2006–2007: Darüşşafaka
- 2007–2008: Beşiktaş
- 2008–2013: Anadolu Efes
- 2013–2017: Galatasaray
- 2017–2019: Fenerbahçe
- 2019–2022: Darüşşafaka Tekfen

Career highlights
- EuroCup champion (2016); 2× Turkish League champion (2009, 2018); Turkish Cup winner (2009); 3× Turkish President's Cup winner (2009, 2010, 2017); 10× BSL All-Star (2008–2017); BSL All-Star Slam Dunk Champion (2010)
Medals
Men's basketball
Representing Turkey
FIBA World Cup
Silver medal – second place	2010 Turkey
Mediterranean Games
Bronze medal – third place	2009 Italy

Sinan Güler (born 8 November 1983) is a Turkish former professional basketball player.

== College career ==
Güler played college basketball at Salt Lake Community College (JUCO), from 2002 to 2004, and at Carroll College (NAIA), from 2004 to 2006.

== Professional career ==
After playing with the youth teams of the Turkish club Beşiktaş, Güler began his pro career with the senior men's team of Beşiktaş, during the 2000–01 season. After then playing college basketball in the United States, he returned to Turkey, and joined Darüşşafaka, before returning to Beşiktaş. He joined the Turkish club Anadolu Efes in 2008. With Efes, he won the Turkish Cup and Turkish Super League in 2009, and the Turkish Supercup in 2009 and 2010.

He moved to the Turkish club Galatasaray in 2013. He eventually became the team captain of Galatasaray. He won the European-wide 2nd-tier level EuroCup championship with Galatasaray in 2016.

On 3 July 2017, Güler signed a 2+1 contract with Fenerbahçe. In 2017–18 EuroLeague, Fenerbahçe made it to the 2018 EuroLeague Final Four, its fourth consecutive Final Four appearance. Eventually, they lost to Real Madrid with 80–85 in the final game. On 6 August 2019, Fenerbahçe exercised their option and released Güler from his contract.

On 29 August 2019, he has signed with Darüşşafaka of the Basketball Super League.

On 20 December 2022, he announced his retirement from professional basketball.

== National team career ==
Güler has been a regular member of the senior Turkish national basketball team since 2009. He is also the team captain of Turkey's senior national team. With Turkey's senior national team, he has played at the following tournaments: the EuroBasket 2009, the 2010 FIBA World Championship, where he won a silver medal, the EuroBasket 2011, the EuroBasket 2013, the 2014 FIBA Basketball World Cup, the EuroBasket 2015, and the 2016 Manila FIBA World Olympic Qualifying Tournament.

== Personal life ==
Güler is the son of retired Turkish professional basketball player, Necat Güler, who played for Fenerbahçe in 1975 and coached them 1993, and the younger brother of Turkish professional basketball player Muratcan Güler.
