= 2016 Turkish Basketball Cup =

- Duration: February 17–21, 2016
- Games played: 7
- Teams: 8
- TV partner(s): NTV Spor

Finals
- Champions: Fenerbahçe (5th title)
- Runners-up: Darüşşafaka Doğuş

Awards
- Final MVP: (Serbia) Bogdan Bogdanović

The 2016 Turkish Basketball Cup / FIAT Turkish Cup (for sponsorship reasons) tournament, is the 31st edition of what the professional men's basketball teams of Turkey can vie for the Turkish Cup. The tournament was held at the Bursa Atatürk Sport Hall in Bursa. It was held from February 17 to February 21.

== Bracket ==
Quarterfinals; February 17–18
Pınar Karşıyaka	67
Anadolu Efes	66
Fenerbahçe	89
Demir İnşaat Büyükçekmece	69
Galatasaray Odeabank	73
Banvit	74
Darüşşafaka Doğuş	83
Trabzonspor Medical Park	52

Semifinals; February 19
Pınar Karşıyaka	71
Fenerbahçe	82
Banvit	74
Darüşşafaka Doğuş	76

Final; February 21
Fenerbahçe	67
Darüşşafaka Doğuş	65

== Final ==
21 February 2016	Fenerbahçe	67–65	Darüşşafaka Doğuş	Bursa
18:30	Scoring by quarter: 21–18, 17–15, 18–18, 11–14
	Pts: Bogdanović 21; Rebs: Veselý 9 Asts: Muhammed 4	Boxscore	Pts: Markoishvili 16; Rebs: Erden 6 Asts: Preldžić 3	Arena: Bursa Atatürk Sport Hall

Fenerbahçe	Darüşşafaka

== Awards ==
=== MVP by Match ===
For or each game a Most Valuable Player honour was handed out by the TBF this tournament.

Player	Team
Quarterfinals
(Poland) A.J. Slaughter	Banvit
(United States) Bracey Wright	Pınar Karşıyaka
(Turkey) Bobby Dixon	Fenerbahçe
(Turkey) Mehmet Yağmur	Darüşşafaka Doğuş
Semifinals
(Italy) Luigi Datome	Fenerbahçe
(Montenegro) Milko Bjelica	Darüşşafaka Doğuş

=== Final MVP ===
- (Serbia) Bogdan Bogdanović (Fenerbahçe)

== See also ==
- 2015–16 Turkish Basketball Super League
