= 2017 Turkish Basketball Presidential Cup =

Turkish basketball event

| Fenerbahçe Doğuş | Banvit |
|---|---|
| 75 | 64 |
- Date: 4 October 2017
- Venue: Ankara Arena, Ankara
- MVP: (Italy) Luigi Datome

The 2017 Turkish Basketball Presidential Cup (Turkish: 2017 Erkekler Basketbol Cumhurbaşkanlığı Kupası) was the 33rd edition of the Turkish Basketball Presidential Cup. The game was played between Fenerbahçe Doğuş, champions of the 2016–17 Basketbol Süper Ligi, and Banvit, the winners of the 2017 Turkish Cup.

Banvit made its second appearance, while Fenerbahçe played in its 14th President's Cup and won its 7th title.

== Venue ==
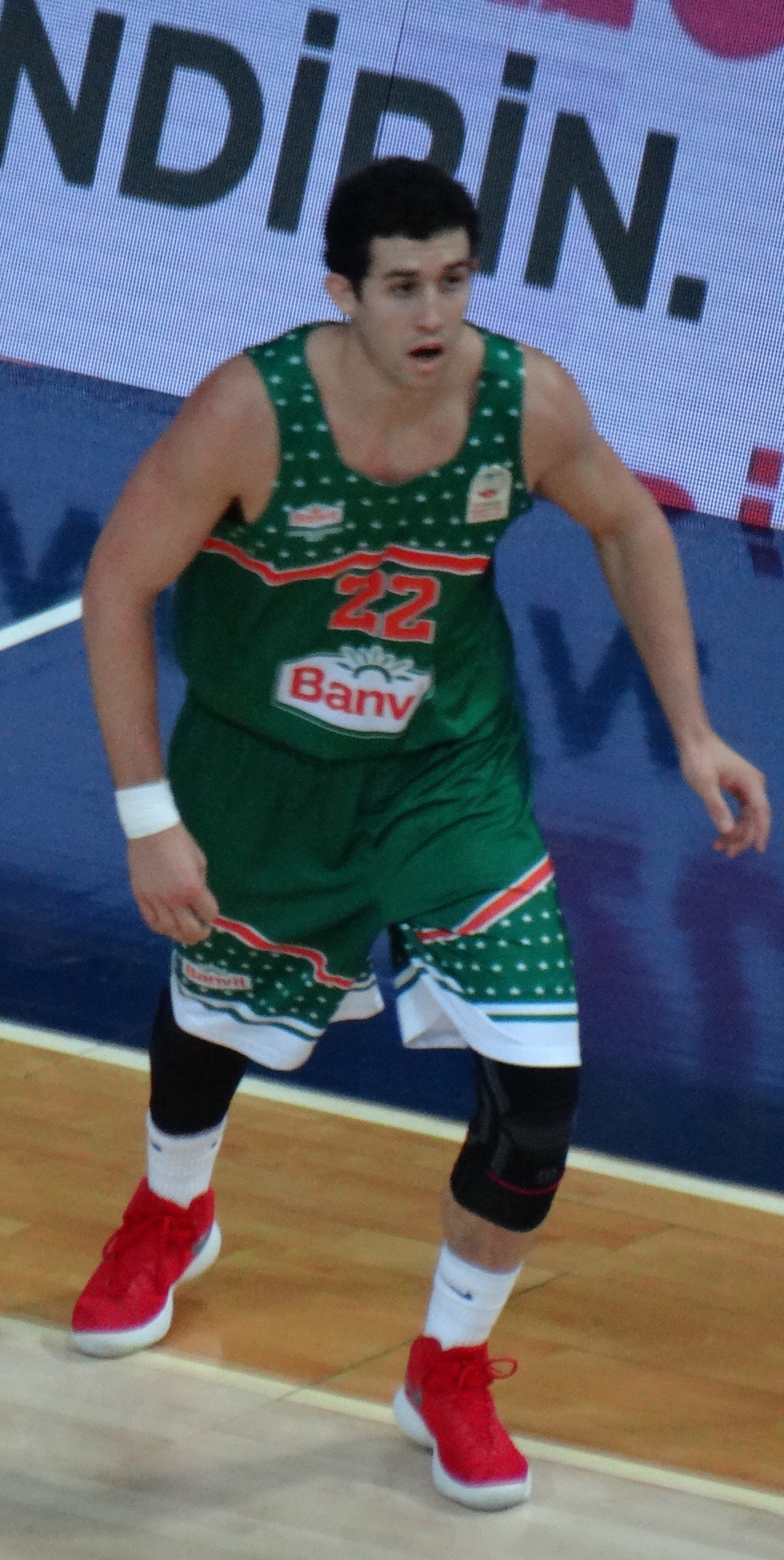
Angelo Caloiaro

| Ankara | 2017 Turkish Basketball Presidential Cup (Turkey) |
| Ankara Arena | 2017 Turkish Basketball Presidential Cup (Turkey) |
| Capacity: 10,400 | 2017 Turkish Basketball Presidential Cup (Turkey) |

== Match details ==
Luigi Datome, who had 14 points and 5 rebounds in the game, was named the Presidential Cup MVP.

| 4 October 2017 | Fenerbahçe Doğuş | 75–64 | Banvit | Ankara |
| 20:00 (TRT) | Scoring by quarter: 19–11, 20–17, 21–20, 15–16 |
| | Pts: Veselý 18; Rebs: Thompson 12; Asts: Sloukas 4 | Boxscore | Pts: Caloiaro 15; Rebs: Vidmar 7 Asts: 4 players 3 | Arena: Ankara Arena; Referees: Ozan Çakar, Ziya Özorhon, Mehmet Şahin |

| Starters: | | | Pts | Reb | Ast |
|---|---|---|---|---|---|
| PG | 16 | (Greece) Kostas Sloukas | 13 | 2 | 4 |
| SG | 11 | (United States) Brad Wanamaker | 11 | 2 | 3 |
| SF | 21 | (United States) James Nunnally | 6 | 3 | 3 |
| PF | 2 | (United States) Jason Thompson | 7 | 12 | 2 |
| C | 24 | (Czech Republic) Jan Veselý | 18 | 7 | 2 |
| Reserves: | | | | | |
| SF | 3 | (Turkey) Ergi Tırpancı | DNP | | |
| PF | 5 | (Turkey) Barış Hersek | 2 | 1 | 1 |
| SG | 10 | (Turkey) Melih Mahmutoğlu | 2 | 4 | 0 |
| SF | 18 | (Turkey) Egehan Arna | 0 | 0 | 0 |
| SG | 32 | (Turkey) Sinan Güler | 0 | 0 | 1 |
| C | 44 | (Jordan) Ahmet Düverioğlu | 2 | 1 | 1 |
| SF | 70 | (Italy) Luigi Datome | 14 | 5 | 0 |
Head coach:
(Serbia) Željko Obradović

| Fenerbahçe | Banvit |

| Fenerbahçe | Statistics | Banvit |
|---|---|---|
| 14/33 (42.4%) | 2-pt field goals | 19/45 (42.2%) |
| 10/25 (40%) | 3-pt field goals | 4/13 (30.8%) |
| 17/20 (85%) | Free throws | 14/23 (60.9%) |
| 10 | Offensive rebounds | 9 |
| 27 | Defensive rebounds | 20 |
| 37 | Total rebounds | 29 |
| 17 | Assists | 14 |
| 9 | Turnovers | 3 |
| 3 | Steals | 8 |
| 2 | Blocks | 1 |
| 24 | Fouls | 20 |

2017 Turkish Presidential Cup champions
Fenerbahçe
(7th title)

| Starters: | | | Pts | Reb | Ast |
|---|---|---|---|---|---|
| PG | 21 | (United States) Tony Taylor | 7 | 4 | 3 |
| SG | 13 | (United States) Jake Odum | 10 | 0 | 3 |
| SF | 2 | (United States) Adonis Thomas | 7 | 3 | 1 |
| PF | 8 | (Turkey) Tolga Geçim | 5 | 5 | 3 |
| C | 14 | (Slovenia) Gašper Vidmar | 10 | 7 | 1 |
| Reserves: | | | | | |
| PF | 7 | (Poland) Damian Kulig | 6 | 5 | 0 |
| SG | 10 | (Turkey) Can Altıntığ | 4 | 2 | 3 |
| SG | 11 | (Turkey) Erkin Şenel | DNP | | |
| C | 12 | (Turkey) Metehan Akyel | DNP | | |
| PG | 20 | (Turkey) Rıdvan Öncel | DNP | | |
| SF | 22 | (United States) Angelo Caloiaro | 15 | 3 | 0 |
| C | 35 | (Turkey) Ragip Atar | DNP | | |
Head coach:
(Slovenia) Sašo Filipovski
