= Željko Obradović =

Serbian basketball player and coach (born 1960)

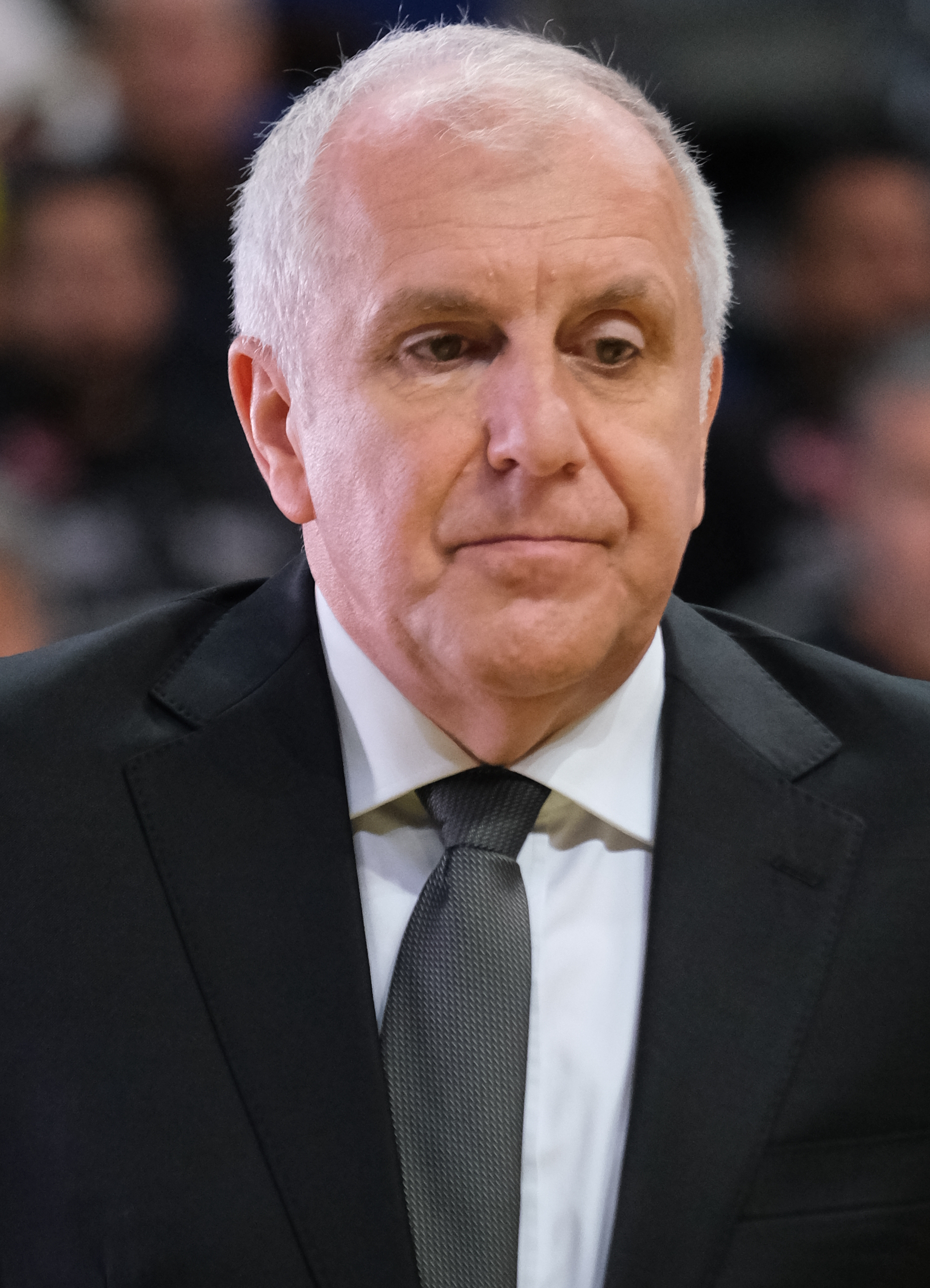
- Obradović as head coach of Partizan in 2024

Panathinaikos
- Title: Head coach
- League: Greek Basketball League; EuroLeague

Personal information
- Born: 9 March 1960 (age 66) Čačak, PR Serbia, Yugoslavia
- Listed height: 6 ft 1 in (1.85 m)
- Listed weight: 175 lb (79 kg)

Career information
- NBA draft: 1982: undrafted
- Playing career: 1978–1991
- Position: Point guard
- Coaching career: 1991–present

Career history

Playing
- 1978–1984: Borac Čačak
- 1984–1991: Partizan

Coaching
- 1991–1993: Partizan
- 1992–1995: FR Yugoslavia (assistant)
- 1993–1994: Joventut Badalona
- 1994–1997: Real Madrid
- 1996–2000: FR Yugoslavia
- 1997–1999: Benetton Treviso
- 1999–2012: Panathinaikos
- 2004–2005: Serbia and Montenegro
- 2013–2020: Fenerbahçe
- 2021–2025: Partizan
- 2026–present: Panathinaikos

Career highlights
- As player: FIBA Korać Cup champion (1989); Yugoslav League champion (1987); Yugoslav Cup winner (1989); As head coach: 9× EuroLeague champion (1992, 1994, 1995, 2000, 2002, 2007, 2009, 2011, 2017); 2× FIBA Saporta Cup champion (1997, 1999); 11× Greek League champion (2000, 2001, 2003–2011); 4× Turkish League champion (2014, 2016, 2017, 2018); Yugoslav League champion (1992); 2× ABA League champion (2023, 2025); Lliga Catalana de Bàsquet champion (1994); 7× Greek Cup winner (2003, 2005–2009, 2012); 3× Turkish Cup winner (2016, 2019, 2020); Yugoslav Cup winner (1992); 3× Turkish Supercup winner (2013, 2016, 2017); Italian Supercup winner (1997); 3× European Triple Crown winner (1992, 2007, 2009); FIBA EuroStar (2007); Greek League Hall of Fame (2022); 2× FIBA European Coach of the Year (1994, 1995); 3× EuroLeague Coach of the Year (2007, 2011, 2017); 5× Greek League Coach of the Year (2000, 2005, 2007, 2009, 2011); 2× ABA League Coach of the Year (2022, 2023); 2x Manager of the Year in Turkey (2017, 2018); Best Sports Coach in Greece (2009); 50 Greatest EuroLeague Contributors (2008); Ivković Award for Lifetime Achievement (1999)
Medals
Men's basketball
Representing Yugoslavia
Summer Olympics
Silver medal – second place	1988 Seoul
FIBA World Cup
Gold medal – first place	1990 Argentina
Goodwill Games
Gold medal – first place	1990 Seattle
Head coach for FR Yugoslavia
Summer Olympics
Silver medal – second place	1996 Atlanta
FIBA World Cup
Gold medal – first place	1998 Greece
EuroBasket
Gold medal – first place	1997 Spain
Bronze medal – third place	1999 France
Assistant coach for FR Yugoslavia
EuroBasket
Gold medal – first place	1995 Greece

Želimir "Željko" Obradović (Serbian Cyrillic: Желимир "Жељко" Обрадовић, pronounced [ʒɛ̌limiːr ʒêːʎko obrǎːdoʋitɕ]; born 9 March 1960) is a Serbian professional basketball coach and former player who serves as the head coach for Panathinaikos of the Greek Basketball League (GBL) and the EuroLeague.

Widely regarded as the greatest coach in European basketball history and outside the NBA, Obradović has won a total of 66 club titles and honours over the course of his 30-year-long coaching career, including a record nine EuroLeague titles with five different clubs, along with 18 EuroLeague Final Four appearances. In addition to his success at club level, he has also won major trophies as head coach of the Yugoslavia national team (modern Serbia), winning the gold medals at the 1997 EuroBasket and the 1998 FIBA World Championship.

Among his individual coaching awards, he has won two FIBA European Coach of the Year awards, three EuroLeague Coach of the Year awards, four Greek Basket League Best Coach awards, the ABA League Coach of the Season award, two Manager of the Year in Turkey awards, the Best Sports Coach in Greece award and the Ivković Award for Lifetime Achievement. In 2008, he was named one of the 50 Greatest EuroLeague Contributors, making the list as one of the ten head coaches that were chosen.

== Early life ==
Obradović was born on 9 March 1960, in Čačak, PR Serbia, FPR Yugoslavia.

== Playing career ==
=== Borac Čačak (1978–1984) ===
Obradović started his club career as a basketball player with Borac Čačak, in their youth system.

During the 1977–78 season, then eighteen-year-old Obradović, got his first taste of senior men's team basketball at Borac, as he appeared in six Yugoslav First Federal League games during the season, and contributed a total of 3 points. After eventually establishing himself as the team's starting point guard, he stayed with the club until 1984.

=== Partizan (1984–1991) ===
Obradović joined Partizan in 1984. He was brought in by Partizan's incoming head coach Moka Slavnić and vice president Dragan Kićanović, both recent retirees who had starred on the Yugoslav national team throughout the 1970s as a legendary guard duo.

In Obradović's third season with the team, Partizan won the 1986–87 season title of the Yugoslav League. In the following season, they reached the 1987–88 season edition of the European Champions Cup's Final Four. Finally, they won the 1989 Yugoslav Cup and the Korać Cup's championship of the 1988–89 season. During his time at Partizan, Obradović established himself as one of the best and most reliable point guards in Yugoslavia's top-level league.

=== National team ===
Obradović was a member of the junior national teams of Yugoslavia. With Yugoslav under-19 national team, he played at the 1979 FIBA Under-19 World Championship.

He was also a member of the senior Yugoslav national team. With Yugoslavia's senior national team, he won a silver medal at the 1988 Summer Olympics, and a gold medal at the 1990 FIBA World Championship.

== Coaching career ==
Obradović's relevancy as a professional club basketball coach is confirmed by the collection of titles he has acquired in his twenty-eight-year career as a head coach, including a record 9 European-wide premiere level EuroLeague championships (won with five different teams), a record 14 EuroLeague Finals appearances, a record 18 EuroLeague Final Four appearances, two European-wide secondary level Saporta Cup championships, and numerous national domestic league championships and national cups.

=== Partizan (1991–1993) ===
Obradović's coaching career began quite suddenly in the summer of 1991 while he was still an active thirty-one-year-old Partizan player getting ready for EuroBasket 1990 with the Yugoslav national team. Selected and coached by Dušan Ivković, the 1991 national squad was to be captained by Obradović—the oldest player among the assembled group. While Obradović was away at the national team's training camp in Poreč, Partizan vice-president Dragan Kićanović proposed appointing him as the club's head coach. The proposal was accepted by club president Radojica Nikčević and other members of the management. Obradović accepted the offer, ending his playing career and giving up the opportunity to captain Yugoslavia at the upcoming European Championship. He informed Ivković of his decision at the airport before the national team departed for the tournament.

The idea was to have Obradović, a debutante head coach, work under the guidance of experienced elder statesman of Yugoslav basketball, sixty-seven-year-old professor Aleksandar Nikolić, whose coaching advisory services were soon secured by Kićanović and the club management. Also joining the front office in the technical director capacity was another fresh retiree from playing, thirty-one-year-old Milenko Savović, Obradović's longtime teammate at Partizan, who had spent the previous 1990–91 season playing for Vojvodina.

In the 1991–92 season, Partizan had a 20–2 record in the 1991–92 YUBA League regular season. In the playoffs, they progressed to the final, winning the best-of-five series 3–0 against Crvena zvezda. It also won the Yugoslav Cup in 1992, beating Bosna 105–70 in the final game. In European competition, Obradović led the young squad to become the champions of 1991–92 FIBA European League, on the spur of breakup of Yugoslavia. Partizan played its international matches in Fuenlabrada, Spain, due to international sanctions imposed on FR Yugoslavia.

In 1992–93 season, Partizan was runner-up to Crvena zvezda with 3–2 record in the final series. In 1993 Yugoslav Cup, it lost with 104–91 in the final game to OKK Beograd.

=== Joventut Badalona (1993–1994) ===
In 1993, Obradović signed a contract with the Spanish team Joventut Badalona, based in Badalona. With Joventut, he won the 1993–94 FIBA European League. In Liga ACB, Joventut finished in 3rd place with 24–14 record. In 1994 Copa del Rey de Baloncesto, Joventut was eliminated in the quarterfinals. However, he won the 1993–94 Torneo Comunidad de Bàsquet.

=== Real Madrid (1994–1997) ===
After the end of season, Obradović signed a contract with Real Madrid. In his first season with the club, Real Madrid failed to defend the Liga ACB title, finishing in 3rd place with 27–19 record. In 1995 Copa del Rey de Baloncesto, Real Madrid finished in 4th place. However, he won the 1994–95 FIBA European League.

In the 1994–95 season, Real Madrid did not manage to take any title. In Liga ACB, Real Madrid finished in 5th place with 28–12 record. In 1995–96 Copa del Rey de Baloncesto, Real Madrid finished in 3rd place. On the European scene, Obradović made his third consecutive Final Four appearance and second with Real Madrid, but ended losing in 3rd place game. In the 1996–97 season, Real Madrid finished as the runner-up in the Liga ACB and was also eliminated in the quarterfinals of the 1997 Copa del Rey de Baloncesto. In European competitions, Real Madrid participated in second-tier FIBA Saporta Cup and eventually won it with a score of 78–64 in the final game over Verona. At the end of the season, Obradović parted ways with the team.

=== Benetton Treviso (1997–1999) ===
In the summer of 1996, in-demand Obradović, who had just won EuroBasket 1996 as FR Yugoslavia's head coach, made a high profile club move, signing with the Italian league champions Benetton Treviso thus succeeding Mike D'Antoni who had taken an offer from the NBA to join the Denver Nuggets' coaching staff as an assistant. Acquired on initiative by the club's general manager Maurizio Gherardini, reportedly despite some initial apprehension on the part of the Benetton Group CEO Luciano Benetton, the three-time-Euroleague-winning coach Obradović took over the squad led by the center Željko Rebrača (whom the coach already knew well having coached him in Partizan and Yugoslavia national team to great success) and shooting guard Henry Williams.

In the 1996–97 season, Treviso was eliminated in the quarterfinal series of the Serie A1 playoffs with 3–2 record by Reggio Emilia. In 1996–97 FIBA EuroLeague, Treviso finished in 3rd place after 96–89 win over Partizan in the Final Four.

In the 1997–98 season, Treviso finished as the runner-up in the Serie A1 playoffs, after 3–0 record in the final series against Varese. Also, Treviso won the FIBA Saporta Cup, following 64–60 win in the final game over Valencia.

=== Panathinaikos (1999–2012) ===
In the summer of 1999, Obradović became head coach of Panathinaikos. In his first season with the club, he won the 1999–2000 Greek Basket League with 3–0 record in the final series against PAOK Thessaloniki. Also, Panathinaikos won the 1999–2000 FIBA Euroleague, after a 73–67 win in the final game over Maccabi Tel Aviv. It was club's second Euroleague championship in history.

Obradović stayed with Panathinaikos until 2012, leading the team to become the top club in European club basketball during that time, while simultaneously maintaining the club at the top position in the Greek national championship. In total, Obradović won with Panathinaikos eleven Greek League championships, seven Greek Cups and five Euroleague titles (2000, 2002, 2007, 2009, and 2011).

In 2007, he achieved winning the highly coveted Triple Crown championship, for the second time as a head coach (the first was in 1992 with Partizan), and won the EuroLeague Coach of the Year award. Also in 2009, in Berlin, he completed this achievement as head coach for the third time. In 2011, he won his 8th Euroleague trophy overall, and 5th with Panathinaikos.

Despite winning the Greek Cup in the 2011–12 season, Panathinaikos finished 4th in the 2011–12 season of the Euroleague.

=== Fenerbahçe (2013–2020) ===
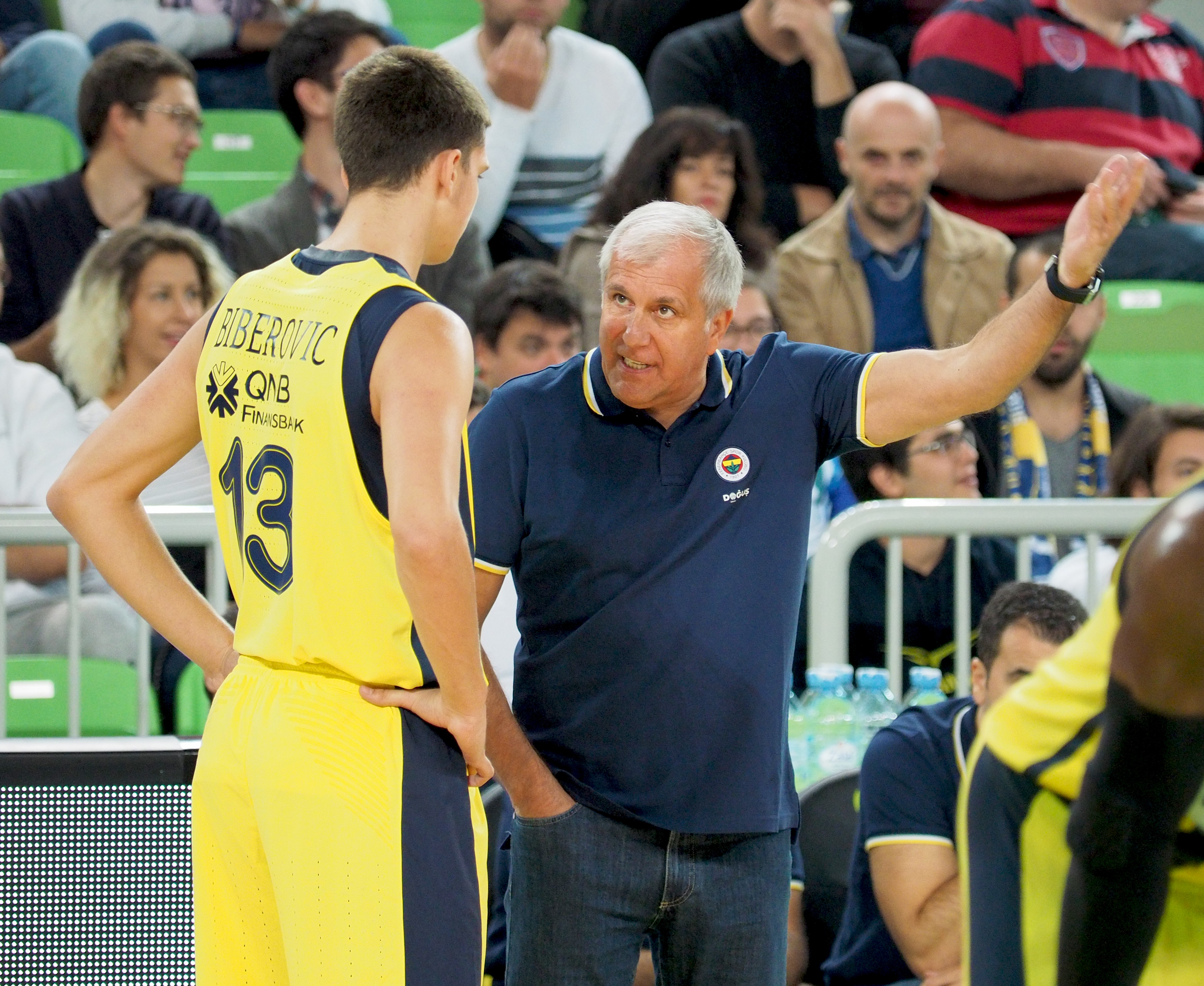
Obradović talking to Tarik Biberović, 2017 Fenerbahçe season

In early July 2013, Obradović signed a two-year contract with the Turkish club Fenerbahçe, that was reportedly worth €3 million in net income salary, over the contract period. After inheriting a roster with point guard Bo McCalebb and versatile shooting guards / small forwards Bojan Bogdanović and Emir Preldžić, the famous head coach added a pair of marquee forwards, in Linas Kleiza and Nemanja Bjelica. He additionally signed Luka Žorić and Melih Mahmutoğlu, as well as talented youngsters Ömer Yurtseven and Kenan Sipahi.

In his first season with the club, Obradović won the Turkish League championship, following a 4–3 record in the league's finals series against Galatasaray. In the 2014 Turkish Cup, Fenerbahçe were eliminated in the semifinals by Pınar Karşıyaka. In the 2013–14 EuroLeague season, they reached the Top 16 stage.

In the 2014–15 season, Fenerbahçe finished the regular season of the Turkish League in first place, with a 23–7 record. In the Turkish League Playoffs, they were eliminated in the semifinals series by Karşıyaka Basket, with a 3–1 record. They were also runners-up in the 2015 Turkish Cup. In the 2014–15 EuroLeague season, Fenerbahçe reached the 2015 Euroleague Final Four, where they were eliminated in the semifinals, and later lost in the 3rd place game. The appearance in the EuroLeague Final Four was the first in the club's long history. On 25 May 2015, after the end of season, he signed a two-year extension with Fenerbahçe.

In the 2015–16 season, Fenerbahçe finished in second place in the Turkish Super League regular season, with a 24–6 record. In the Turkish Super League Playoffs, Fenerbahçe went on to win the league championship, with a 4–2 record in the finals series against Anadolu Efes. The club also won the 2016 Turkish Cup. In the 2015–16 EuroLeague season, they finished as runners-up, after losing against CSKA Moscow in the final game of the 2016 Final Four.

On 18 November 2016, Ozan Balaban, a board member of Fenerbahçe SK, declared at the QNB Finansbank sponsorship ceremony of the club, that Obradović would sign a new three-year deal with the club. On 3 December 2016, Obradović officially extended his contract with the club, until the end of the 2019–20 season.

In the 2016–17 season, Fenerbahçe finished with a 28–2 record in the Turkish Super League regular season, and eventually won the league championship, after a 4–0 record in the finals series over rivals Beşiktaş. On 21 May 2017, Fenerbahçe won the EuroLeague championship finals game against Olympiacos, which was the first EuroLeague championship in the club's history, and also the first for any Turkish team. In the summer of 2017, two of the team's core players, Bogdan Bogdanović and Ekpe Udoh, left the team and moved to the NBA.

In the 2017–18 season, Fenerbahçe once again finished the Turkish Super League regular season in first place, with a dominant 27–3 record. In the 2018 Turkish Cup, Fenerbahçe were eliminated early in the quarterfinals, by the eventual cup winners, Anadolu Efes. In the 2017–18 EuroLeague season, Fenerbahçe made it to the 2018 EuroLeague Final Four, their fourth consecutive Final Four appearance. Eventually, they lost to Real Madrid, by a score of 80–85, in the final game. At the end of the season, Fenerbahçe won its third consecutive Turkish Super League title, after winning the league's finals series 4–1 against Tofaş.

In the 2018–19 season, Fenerbahçe lost to Efes in the Turkish Presidential Cup final, and later beat Efes in the 2019 Turkish Cup final. They also lost to Efes in the Turkish Super League playoff's finals series, 4–3. In the 2018–19 EuroLeague season, the club made its fifth straight EuroLeague Final Four appearance, as they qualified to the 2019 EuroLeague Final Four, where they finished in fourth place.

In the 2019–20 season, Fenerbahçe had underwhelming results as they were in the bottom and the middle of 2019–20 EuroLeague Regular Season standings from the beginning of the season until the season cancellation in May 2020 due to the COVID-19 pandemic. After 28 rounds, they had 13–15 record and were holding 8th place which would lead them to quarterfinals. In 2019–20 Basketbol Süper Ligi which was also cancelled in May for the same reason, Fenerbahçe was in fourth place with 17–5 record and one game behind the worse-record Galatasaray.

On 23 June 2020, Fenerbahçe announced that Obradović would no longer be the head coach since he wants to take a break from coaching for one year.

=== Return to Partizan (2021–2025) ===
On 25 June 2021, Obradović signed a three-year contract with Partizan, returning to his former club after 28 years. In the 2021–22 EuroCup, Partizan was eliminated in eighfinals by Bursaspor at home court, which was considered a failure as one of the season goals was to run deep into the competition. In the 2021–22 ABA League, Partizan improved their regular season record over last season by 9 wins, having 22–4 record. In April 2022, Obradović was named the ABA League Coach of the Season for 2021–22 regular season performances. Partizan ended the 2022–23 season by lifting the ABA League championship trophy, after 3–2 score against Crvena zvezda in the Finals series.

In April 2024, Obradović signed a contract extension with Partizan. The 2023–24 season was deemed to be unsuccessful for Partizan as they finished the season without lifting any trophy. On June 12, 2025, Partizan won its 8th ABA League title by defeating Budućnost in the final series with a score of 3–1. Partizan also managed to lift the Serbian League championship, the first one after 11 seasons. Bogdan Karaičić, Obradović' assistant coach, led the team during the Playoff, due to four-game suspension for Obradović and team decision to give Karaičić the head coaching position.

Following series of poor results, during 2025–26 campaign, winning only 3 of the last 11 games, he resigned as head coach of Partizan on 26 November 2025. Despite a large gathering of supporters at Belgrade Nikola Tesla Airport on 27 November 2025, estimated at more than 5,000 fans appealing for him to remain, Obradović ultimately confirmed his resignation on 2 December 2025. In a subsequent address to the supporters, he outlined the reasons for his departure, criticising the club president and pointing to a series of irregularities that, he stated, had occurred in recent seasons and diverted attention from his work on the court.

=== Return to Panathinaikos (2026–present) ===
On 21 June 2026, Obradovic returned to Panathinaikos after 14 years, signing a three-year contract.

== National team coaching career ==
Previously an assistant coach to Dušan Ivković, from 1992 to 1995, Obradović worked as head coach of the senior FR Yugoslavia national team, from 1996 to 2000. With FR Yugoslavia, he won a silver medal at the 1996 Summer Olympics, a gold medal at the 1997 EuroBasket, a gold medal at the 1998 FIBA World Championship, and a bronze medal at the 1999 EuroBasket. He was also the Serbia and Montenegro national team head coach, from 2004 to 2005. He stands as the most successful head coach for the Serbia national team since the break-up of SFR Yugoslavia.

== Coaching style ==
Well known for his temperamental approach, Obradović also has a reputation for being adaptable, with his ability to course correct on the fly underscored by a number of his coaching collaborators and rivals.

He often utilized a system heavy on pick-and-rolls, focusing on using the corners and back passes to open up the offense and make it more difficult for the defense to commit. With Panathinaikos, from 2004 onward, he made center Mike Batiste and point guard Dimitris Diamantidis the focal points of this pick-and-roll setup. In the process, Obradović moved both players from their traditional positions—Diamantidis from shooting guard to point guard and undersized combo forward Batiste to center—thereby implementing one of the first small ball setups in professional basketball to yield great results.

Revered San Antonio Spurs head coach Gregg Popovich has been a longtime admirer of Obradović's coaching style, frequently praising him and admitting to "stealing his plays". In turn, Obradović, ahead of his second season coaching Fenerbahce, talked about spending a significant portion of the summer 2014 off-season, dissecting the San Antonio game, particularly positioning and ball movement, with a view of implementing it into his team.

== Coaching record ==
Legend
G	Games coached	W	Games won	L	Games lost	W–L %	Win-loss %

Note: The EuroLeague is not the only competition in which the team played during the season. He also coached in domestic competition, and regional competition if applicable.

=== EuroLeague ===
Team	Year	G	W	L	W–L%	Result
Partizan
Partizan	1991–92	21	15	6	.714	Won EuroLeague Championship
Joventut
Joventut	1993–94	20	15	5	.750	Won EuroLeague Championship
Real Madrid
Real Madrid	1994–95	18	13	5	.722	Won EuroLeague Championship
Real Madrid	1995–96	19	11	8	.579	Lost in 3rd place game
Benetton	1997–98	23	17	6	.739	Won in 3rd place game
Panathinaikos
Panathinaikos	1999–00	23	19	4	.826	Won EuroLeague Championship
Panathinaikos	2000–01	24	18	6	.750	Lost in the final game
Panathinaikos	2001–02	22	19	3	.864	Won EuroLeague Championship
Panathinaikos	2002–03	20	14	6	.700	Eliminated in Top 16 stage
Panathinaikos	2003–04	20	9	11	.450	Eliminated in Top 16 stage
Panathinaikos	2004–05	25	15	10	.600	Won in 3rd place game
Panathinaikos	2005–06	23	16	7	.696	Lost in Quarterfinal Playoffs
Panathinaikos	2006–07	24	20	4	.833	Won EuroLeague Championship
Panathinaikos	2007–08	20	15	5	.750	Eliminated in Top 16 stage
Panathinaikos	2008–09	22	17	5	.773	Won EuroLeague Championship
Panathinaikos	2009–10	16	10	6	.625	Eliminated in Top 16 stage
Panathinaikos	2010–11	22	16	6	.727	Won EuroLeague Championship
Panathinaikos	2011–12	23	14	9	.609	Lost in 3rd place game
Fenerbahçe	2013–14	24	14	10	.583	Eliminated in Top 16 stage
Fenerbahçe	2014–15	29	22	7	.759	Lost in 3rd place game
Fenerbahçe	2015–16	29	23	6	.793	Lost in the final game
Fenerbahçe	2016–17	35	23	12	.657	Won EuroLeague Championship
Fenerbahçe	2017–18	36	25	11	.694	Lost in the final game
Fenerbahçe	2018–19	32	25	7	.781	Lost in 3rd place game
Fenerbahçe	2019–20	28	13	15	.464	Season cancelled
Partizan	2022–23	39	22	17	.564	Lost in Quarterfinal Playoffs
Partizan	2023–24	34	16	18	.471	Eliminated in regular season
Partizan	2024–25	34	16	18	.471	Eliminated in regular season
Partizan	2025–26	13	4	9	.308	(Resigned)
Career		718	476	242	.663	

=== Domestic leagues ===
Team	Year	G	W	L	W–L%	Result
Partizan
Partizan	1991–92	27	25	2	.926	Won 1992 Yugoslav League Finals
Partizan	1992–93	39	28	11	.718	Lost 1993 Yugoslav League Finals
Joventut
Joventut	1993–94	38	24	14	.632	Lost in Semifinals round
Real Madrid
Real Madrid	1994–95	46	27	19	.587	Lost in Semifinals round
Real Madrid	1995–96	40	28	12	.700	Lost in Quarterfinals round
Real Madrid	1996–97	45	37	8	.822	Lost 1997 Spanish League Finals
Benetton
Benetton	1997–98	31	19	12	.613	Lost in Quarterfinals round
Benetton	1998–99	37	25	12	.676	Lost 1999 Italian Basket Seria A Finals
Panathinaikos
Panathinaikos	1999–00	34	28	6	.824	Won 2000 Greek Basket League Finals
Panathinaikos	2000–01	33	27	6	.818	Won 2001 Greek Basket League Finals
Panathinaikos	2001–02	28	21	7	.750	Lost in Semifinals round
Panathinaikos	2002–03	35	28	7	.800	Won 2003 Greek Basket League Finals
Panathinaikos	2003–04	34	29	5	.853	Won 2004 Greek Basket League Finals
Panathinaikos	2004–05	37	30	7	.811	Won 2005 Greek Basket League Finals
Panathinaikos	2005–06	34	32	2	.941	Won 2006 Greek Basket League Finals
Panathinaikos	2006–07	36	32	4	.889	Won 2007 Greek Basket League Finals
Panathinaikos	2007–08	36	31	5	.861	Won 2008 Greek Basket League Finals
Panathinaikos	2008–09	35	30	5	.857	Won 2009 Greek Basket League Finals
Panathinaikos	2009–10	35	33	2	.943	Won 2010 Greek Basket League Finals
Panathinaikos	2010–11	35	32	3	.914	Won 2011 Greek Basket League Finals
Panathinaikos	2011–12	35	29	6	.829	Lost 2012 Greek Basket League Finals
Fenerbahçe
Fenerbahçe	2013–14	42	33	9	.786	Won 2014 Turkish League Finals
Fenerbahçe	2014–15	37	26	11	.703	Lost in Semifinals round
Fenerbahçe	2015–16	42	33	9	.786	Won 2016 Turkish League Finals
Fenerbahçe	2016–17	39	37	2	.949	Won 2017 Turkish League Finals
Fenerbahçe	2017–18	40	36	4	.900	Won 2018 Turkish League Finals
Fenerbahçe	2018–19	41	32	9	.780	Lost 2019 Turkish League Finals
Fenerbahçe	2019–20	22	17	5	.773	Season cancelled
Partizan
Partizan	2023–24	5	2	3	.400	Lost 2024 Serbian League Finals
Partizan	2024–25	5	4	1	.800	Won 2025 Serbian League Finals
Career		1023	815	208	.797	

=== Regional leagues ===
Team	Year	G	W	L	W–L%	Result
Partizan
Partizan	2021–22	34	26	8	.765	Lost 2022 ABA League Finals
Partizan	2022–23	37	31	6	.838	Won 2023 ABA League Finals
Partizan	2023–24	34	24	10	.706	Lost 2024 ABA League Finals
Partizan	2024–25	39	33	6	.846	Won 2025 ABA League Finals
Partizan	2025–26	6	5	1	.833	(Resigned)
Career		150	119	31	.793	

== Playing achievements ==
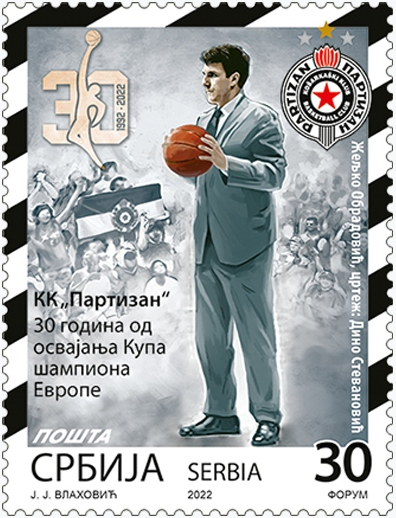
Obradović on a 2022 stamp of Serbia

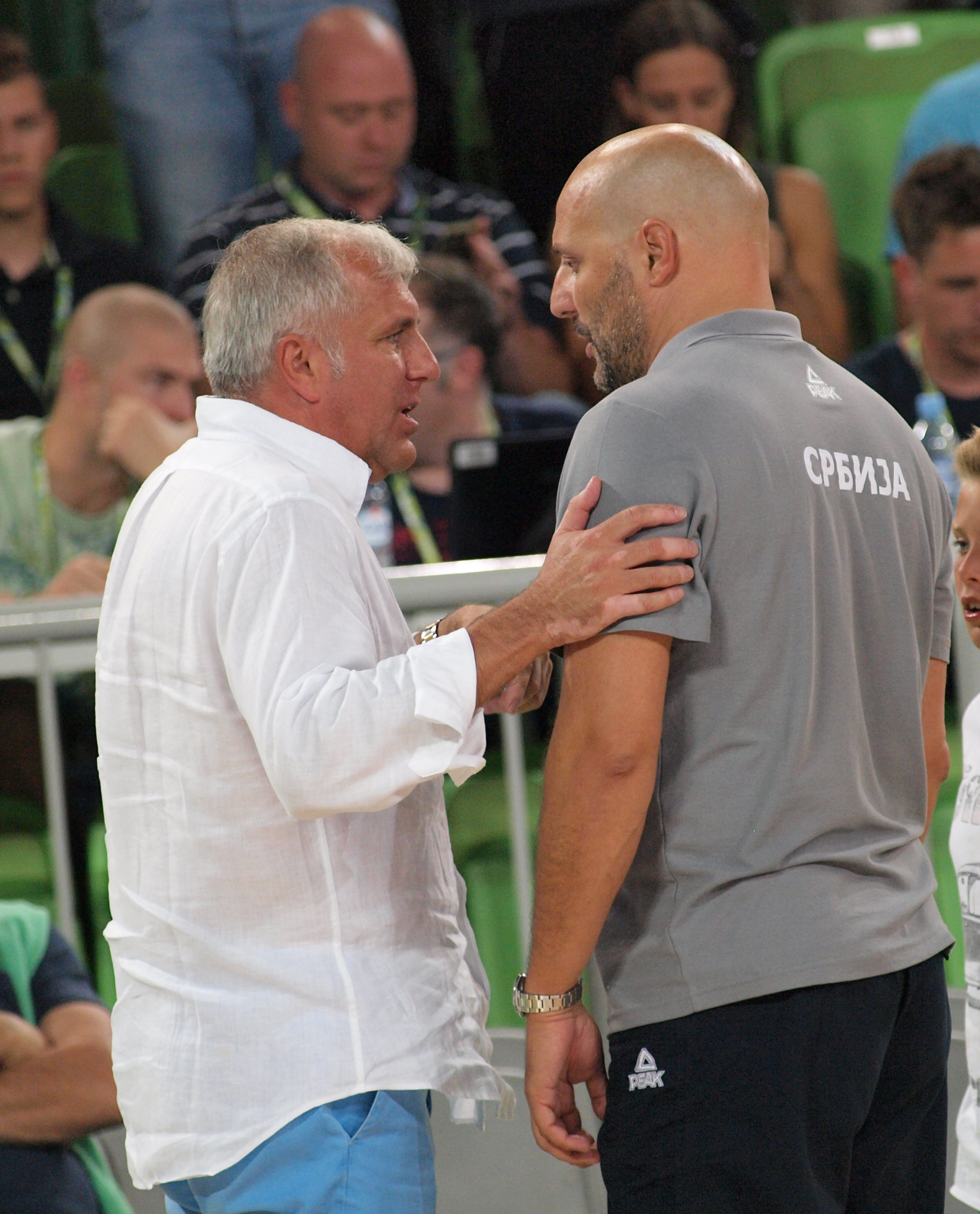
Obradović with Aleksandar Đorđević in August 2015

- FIBA Korać Cup champion: 1 (with Partizan: 1988–89)
- Yugoslav League champion: 1 (with Partizan: 1986–87)
- Yugoslav Cup winner: 1 (with Partizan: 1988–89)
- EuroLeague 3rd place: 1 (with Partizan: 1987–88)
- Yugoslavia national team:
  - 1988 Summer Olympic Games: Silver
  - 1990 FIBA World Championship: Gold

== Coaching achievements ==
=== Multiple titles ===
- European Cups (11×):
  - EuroLeague champion: 9 (with Partizan: 1991–92, Joventut Badalona: 1993–94, Real Madrid: 1994–95, Panathinaikos: 1999–00, 2001–02, 2006–07, 2008–09, 2010–11 and Fenerbahçe: 2016–17)
  - FIBA Saporta Cup winner: 2 (with Real Madrid: 1996–97 and Benetton Treviso: 1998–99)
- Regional Championships (3×):
  - ABA League champion: 2 (with Partizan: 2022–23, 2024–25)
  - Lliga Catalana de Bàsquet champion: 1 (with Joventut Badalona: 1994)
- National Championships (17×):
  - Greek League champion: 11 (with Panathinaikos: 1999–00, 2000–01, 2002–03, 2003–04, 2004–05, 2005–06, 2006–07, 2007–08, 2008–09, 2009–10, 2010–11)
  - Turkish League champion: 4 (with Fenerbahçe: 2013–14, 2015–16, 2016–17, 2017–18)
  - Yugoslav League champion: 1 (with Partizan: 1991–92)
- National Cups (11×):
  - Greek Cup winner: 7 (with Panathinaikos: 2002–03, 2004–05, 2005–06, 2006–07, 2007–08, 2008–09, 2011–12)
  - Turkish Cup winner: 3 (with Fenerbahçe: 2016, 2019, 2020)
  - Yugoslav Cup winner: 1 (with Partizan: 1991–92)
- National Super Cups (4×):
  - Turkish Super Cup winner: 3 (with Fenerbahçe: 2013, 2016, 2017)
  - Italian Super Cup winner: 1 (with Benetton Treviso: 1997)
- EuroLeague Final Four Participation without winning (9×):
  - 2nd place: 3 (with Panathinaikos: 2000–01 and Fenerbahçe: 2015–16, 2017–18)
  - 3rd place: 2 (with Benetton Treviso: 1997–98 and Panathinaikos: 2004–05)
  - 4th place: 4 (with Real Madrid: 1995–96, Panathinaikos: 2011–12 and Fenerbahçe: 2014–15, 2018–19)

=== Titles by club ===
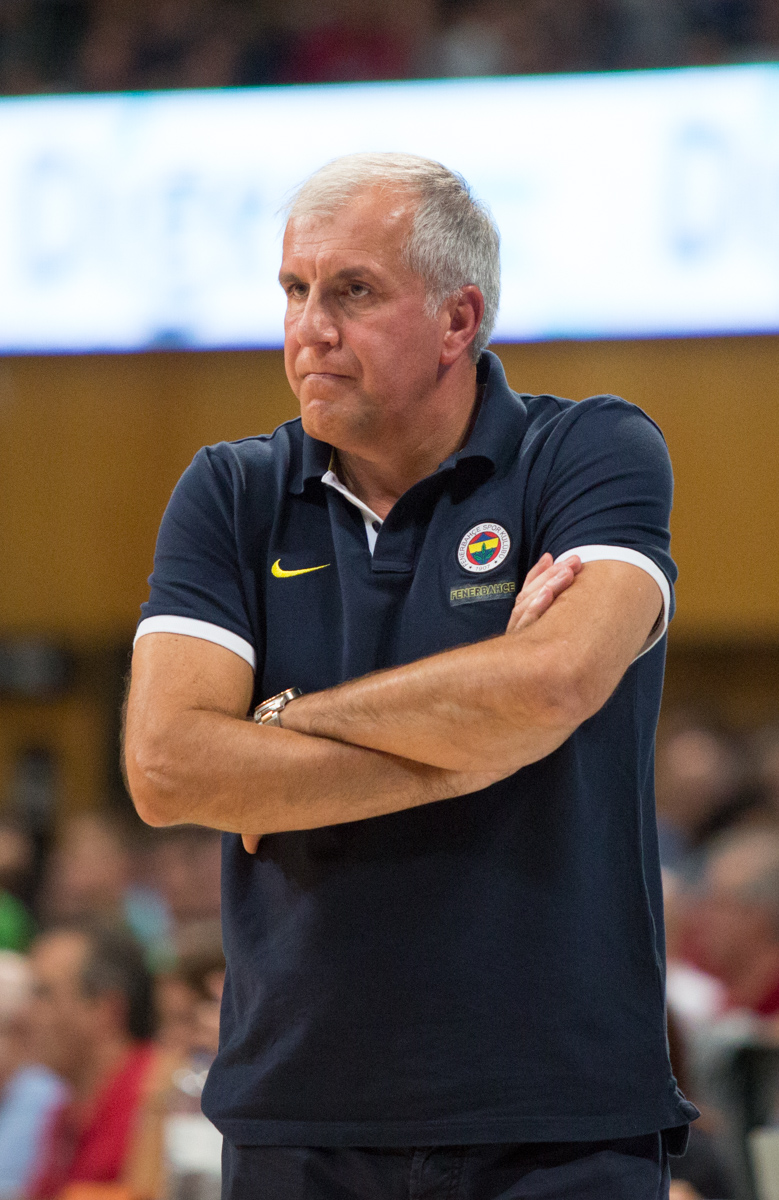
Obradović with Fenerbahçe against his former club Joventut Badalona in September 2016

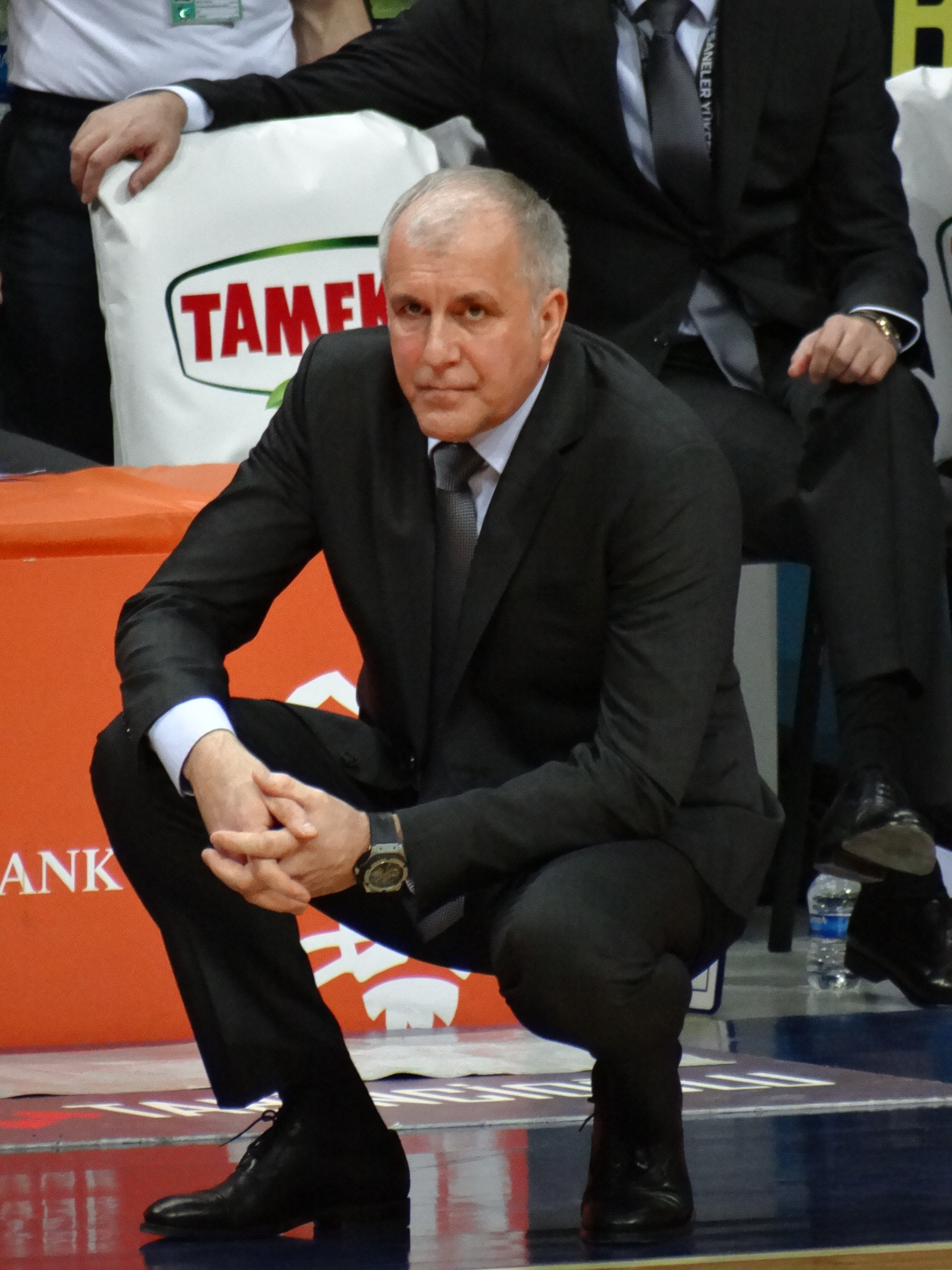
Obradović with Fenerbahçe in March 2018

- Partizan (1991–1993, 2021–2025)
  - EuroLeague champion: (1992)
  - Yugoslav League champion: (1992)
  - Yugoslav Cup winner: (1992)
  - 2× ABA League champion: (2022–23, 2024–25)
- Joventut Badalona (1993–1994)
  - EuroLeague champion: (1994)
  - Lliga Catalana de Bàsquet champion: (1994)
- Real Madrid (1994–1997)
  - EuroLeague champion: (1995)
  - FIBA Saporta Cup champion: (1997)
- Benetton Treviso (1997–1999)
  - FIBA Saporta Cup champion: (1999)
  - Italian Super Cup winner: (1997)
- Panathinaikos (1999–2012)
  - 5× EuroLeague champion: (2000, 2002, 2007, 2009, 2011)
  - 11× Greek League champion: (2000, 2001, 2003, 2004, 2005, 2005–06, 2006–07, 2007–08, 2008–09, 2009–10, 2010–11)
  - 7× Greek Cup winner: (2003, 2005, 2006, 2007, 2008, 2009, 2012)
- Fenerbahçe (2013–2020)
  - EuroLeague champion: (2017)
  - 4× Turkish League champion: (2013–14, 2015–16, 2016–17, 2017–18)
  - 3× Turkish Cup winner: (2016, 2019, 2020)
  - 3× Turkish Super Cup winner: (2013, 2016, 2017)
- FR Yugoslavia/Serbia and Montenegro National Team (1992–2000, 2004–2005)
  - Assistant coach
    - 1995 EuroBasket: Gold
  - Head coach
    - 1996 Summer Olympics: Silver
    - 1997 EuroBasket: Gold
    - 1998 FIBA World Championship: Gold
    - 1999 EuroBasket: Bronze

=== Individual ===
- 2× FIBA European Coach of the Year: (1994, 1995)
- 3× Eurobasket News All-Europe Coach of the Year: (2007, 2009, 2011)
- 3× EuroLeague Coach of the Year: (2007, 2011, 2017)
- 4× Greek League Coach of the Year: (2000, 2005, 2009, 2011)
- 2× ABA League Coach of the Year: (2022, 2023)
- 2× Manager of the Year in Turkey: (2017, 2018)
- Best Sports Coach in Greece: (2009)
- Ivković Award for Lifetime Achievement: (1999)
- FIBA EuroStar: (2007)
- 50 Greatest EuroLeague Contributors: (2008)

== See also ==
- List of Olympic medalists in basketball
- List of EuroLeague-winning head coaches
- List of FIBA EuroBasket winning head coaches
- FIBA Basketball World Cup winning head coaches
