= 2016 BSL Playoffs =

BSL Playoffs
- Season: 2015–16
- Dates: 17 May – 13 June 2016
- Games played: 22
- Teams: 8

Finals
- Champions: Fenerbahçe (7th title)
- Runners-up: Anadolu Efes
- Semifinalists: Darüşşafaka Doğuş; Galatasaray Odeabank
- Finals MVP: (Italy) Luigi Datome
- All statistics correct as of 16 May 2019.

2016 Basketbol Süper Ligi (BSL) Playoffs were the final phase of the 2015–16 Basketbol Süper Ligi season. The playoffs started on 17 May 2016, With Pınar Karşıyaka as the defending champions.

The eight highest placed teams of the regular season qualified for the playoffs. In the quarter-finals a best-of-three was played, in the semi-finals a best-of-five and in the finals a best-of-seven playoff format was used.

Fenerbahçe Ülker competed against Anadolu Efes in the finals, won the series 4-2 and got their 7th championship.

== Bracket ==
Quarterfinals
1	Anadolu Efes	2
8	Royal Halı Gaziantep	0
4	Darüşşafaka Doğuş	2
5	Banvit	0
2	Fenerbahçe	2
7	Uşak Sportif	0
3	Galatasaray Odeabank	2
6	Pınar Karşıyaka	1

Semifinals
1	Anadolu Efes	3
4	Darüşşafaka Doğuş	0
2	Fenerbahçe	3
3	Galatasaray Odeabank	1

Finals
1	Anadolu Efes	2
2	Fenerbahçe	4

== Quarter-finals ==
=== Anadolu Efes vs. Royal Halı Gaziantep ===
May 17, 2016
18:30 EEST

Report

Anadolu Efes	83–71	Royal Halı Gaziantep
Scoring by quarter: 16–19, 23–25, 23–18, 21–9
Pts: Šarić 21; Rebs: Dunston 7 Asts: Heurtel 6		Pts: Stone 15; Rebs: Stone 7 Asts: Calloway 4
1-0

Abdi İpekçi Arena, Istanbul
Referees: Aytuğ Ekti, Fatih Arslanoğlu, Ayşenur Yazıcıoğlu

May 19, 2016
18:30 EEST

Report

Royal Halı Gaziantep	64–73	Anadolu Efes
Scoring by quarter: 11–16, 19–20, 17–17, 17–20
Pts: Williams 18; Rebs: Calloway 8 Asts: Calloway 7		Pts: Granger 19; Rebs: Šarić 9 Asts: Heurtel 4
Anadolu Efes wins series 2-0

Karataş Şahinbey Sport Hall, Gaziantep
Referees: Murat Biricik, Kaan Büyükçil, Semih Vural

=== Fenerbahçe vs. Uşak Sportif ===
May 18, 2016
21:30 EEST

Report

Fenerbahçe	79–60	Uşak Sportif
Scoring by quarter: 20–12, 18–14, 22–14, 19–20
Pts: Udoh 13; Rebs: Veselý, Luigi Datome 7 Asts: Sloukas 6		Pts: Harris 20; Rebs: Birch 14; Asts: Watson 9
1-0

Ülker Sports Arena, Istanbul
Referees: Serkan Emlek, İsmail Aydın, Ahmet Tatlıcı

May 20, 2016
17:30 EEST

Report

Uşak Sportif	64–81	Fenerbahçe
Scoring by quarter: 11–21, 17–16, 21–22, 15–22
Pts: Harris, Harrison 14; Rebs: Harris, Khem Birch 9 Asts: Harrison 2		Pts: Antić 18; Rebs: Veselý 11; Asts: Bogdanović 5
Fenerbahçe wins series 2-0

Uşak Üniversitesi Sport Hall, Uşak
Referees: Erşan Kartal, Zafer Yılmaz, Altuğ Köselerli

=== Galatasaray Odeabank vs. Pınar Karşıyaka ===
May 18, 2016
19:30 EEST

Report

Galatasaray Odeabank	67–74	Pınar Karşıyaka
Scoring by quarter: 16–15, 18–14, 18–23, 15–22
Pts: Micov 18; Rebs: Micov 7 Asts: Davis 4		Pts: Wright 14; Rebs: Wright 10; Asts: Sipahi, Iverson 4
0-1

Abdi İpekçi Arena, Istanbul
Referees: Engin Kennerman, Ali Şakacı, Sinan İşgüder

May 20, 2016
19:30 EEST

Report

Pınar Karşıyaka	62–65	Galatasaray Odeabank
Scoring by quarter: 7–15, 17–17, 26–18, 12–15
Pts: Wright 12; Rebs: Iverson 7 Asts: Sipahi 5		Pts: Micov, Lasme 16; Rebs: Lasme 11; Asts: Micov 5
1-1

Karşıyaka Arena, İzmir
Referees: Mehmet Keseratar, Yener Yılmaz, Alper Özgök

May 22, 2016
17:00 EEST

Report

Galatasaray Odeabank	77–62	Pınar Karşıyaka
Scoring by quarter: 22–16, 13–11, 23–17, 19–18
Pts: Schilb 15; Rebs: Lasme 7 Asts: McCollum 6		Pts: Gabriel 16; Rebs: Gabriel 9 Asts: Iverson 4
Galatasaray Odeabank wins series 2-1

Abdi İpekçi Arena, Istanbul
Referees: Murat Biricik, Emin Moğulkoç, Serdar Ünal

=== Darüşşafaka Doğuş vs. Banvit ===
May 17, 2016
20:30 EEST

Report

Darüşşafaka Doğuş	77–76	Banvit
Scoring by quarter: 17–24, 18–14, 25–20, 17–18
Pts: Harangody 23; Rebs: Harangody 8 Asts: Redding, Gordon 4		Pts: Moerman 27; Rebs: Moerman 8 Asts: Slaughter, Johnson 4
1-0

Ayhan Şahenk Spor Salonu, Istanbul

May 19, 2016
20:30 EEST

Report

Banvit	73–86	Darüşşafaka Doğuş
Scoring by quarter: 17–15, 18–30, 22–20, 16–21
Pts: Moerman 21; Rebs: Moerman 11; Asts: Slaughter 5		Pts: Wilbekin 29; Rebs: Harangody 10; Asts: Gordon 6
Darüşşafaka Doğuş wins series 2-0

Kara Ali Acar Sport Hall, Bandırma

== Semi-finals ==
=== Anadolu Efes vs. Darüşşafaka Doğuş ===
May 24, 2016
20:00 EEST

Report

Anadolu Efes	80–71	Darüşşafaka
Scoring by quarter: 17–15, 16–19, 14–23, 33–14
Pts: Šarić 17; Rebs: Osman 7 Asts: Heurtel 6		Pts: Wilbekin 17; Rebs: Erden 7 Asts: Wilbekin 5
1–0

Abdi İpekçi Arena, Istanbul

May 26, 2016
18:00 EEST

Report

Anadolu Efes	88–73	Darüşşafaka
Scoring by quarter: 22–10, 21–20, 30–16, 15–27
Pts: Šarić 13; Rebs: Dunston 7 Asts: Balbay 7		Pts: Wilbekin 18; Rebs: Aldemir 8 Asts: Wilbekin 4
2–0

Abdi İpekçi Arena, Istanbul

May 28, 2016
18:00 EEST

Report

Darüşşafaka	83–88	Anadolu Efes
Scoring by quarter: 20–18, 28–20, 17–21, 18–29
Pts: Erden 23; Rebs: Erden, Redding 9 Asts: Wilbekin 5		Pts: Granger 17; Rebs: Derrick Brown 8 Asts: Granger 4
Anadolu Efes wins series 3-0

Ayhan Şahenk Arena, Istanbul

=== Fenerbahçe vs. Galatasaray Odeabank ===
May 25, 2016
20:00 EEST

Report

Fenerbahçe	93–79	Galatasaray Odeabank
Scoring by quarter: 27–22, 30–18, 17–20, 19–19
Pts: Veselý 24; Rebs: Udoh 8 Asts: Bogdanović 5		Pts: McCollum 22; Rebs: Lasme 6 Asts: Güler 4
1–0

Ülker Sports Arena, Istanbul

May 27, 2016
20:00 EEST

Report

Fenerbahçe	80–55	Galatasaray Odeabank
Scoring by quarter: 16–19, 25–18, 19–9, 20–9
Pts: Dixon 19; Rebs: Kalinić 8 Asts: Sloukas 4		Pts: Micov 13; Rebs: Güler, Davis 5 Asts: Güler 3
2–0

Ülker Sports Arena, Istanbul

May 29, 2016
17:00 EEST

Report

Galatasaray Odeabank	65–63	Fenerbahçe
Scoring by quarter: 20–18, 28–20, 17–21, 18–29
Pts: three players 15; Rebs: Lasme 9 Asts: three players 4		Pts: Udoh 18; Rebs: Udoh 10; Asts: Dixon 4
1–2

Abdi İpekçi Arena, Istanbul

May 31, 2016
20:00 EEST

Report

Galatasaray Odeabank	75–82	Fenerbahçe
Scoring by quarter: 23–15, 21–19, 17–24, 14–24
Pts: three players 15; Rebs: Davis 5 Asts: McCollum, Güler 4		Pts: Dixon 18; Rebs: Veselý 9 Asts: Sloukas 4
Fenerbahçe wins series 3-1

Abdi İpekçi Arena, Istanbul

== Finals ==
=== Anadolu Efes vs. Fenerbahçe ===
June 3, 2016
20:00 EEST

Report

Anadolu Efes	85–87	Fenerbahçe
Scoring by quarter: 23–18, 17–17, 17–23, 28–29
Pts: Heurtel 23; Rebs: Dunston 11; Asts: Granger 4		Pts: Udoh 18; Rebs: Datome 10; Asts: three players 3
0-1

Abdi İpekçi Arena, Istanbul

June 5, 2016
18:00 EEST

Report

Anadolu Efes	91–70	Fenerbahçe
Scoring by quarter: 23–29, 24–17, 26–13, 18–11
Pts: Granger, Heurtel 17; Rebs: Šarić 8 Asts: Heurtel 6		Pts: Udoh, Antić 14; Rebs: Udoh 12; Asts: Bogdanović 4
1–1

Abdi İpekçi Arena, Istanbul

June 7, 2016
20:00 EEST

Report

Fenerbahçe	84–72	Anadolu Efes
Scoring by quarter: 23–19, 20–14, 14–24, 27–15
Pts: Bogdanović 17; Rebs: Udoh 9 Asts: Sloukas 3		Pts: Šarić 18; Rebs: three players 5 Asts: Heurtel 6
2–1

Ülker Sports Arena, Istanbul

June 9, 2016
20:00 EEST

Report

Fenerbahçe	101–79	Anadolu Efes
Scoring by quarter: 26–18, 24–19, 26–16, 25–26
Pts: Dixon, Datome 21; Rebs: Udoh, Datome 6 Asts: Bogdanović 7		Pts: Šarić 19; Rebs: Šarić 7 Asts: Balbay 4
3–1

Ülker Sports Arena, Istanbul

June 11, 2016
18:00 EEST

Report

Anadolu Efes	80–72	Fenerbahçe
Scoring by quarter: 6–20, 24–17, 22–15, 28–20
Pts: Heurtel 24; Rebs: Heurtel, Granger 5 Asts: Heurtel, Granger 6		Pts: Datome 19; Rebs: Veselý 15; Asts: Sloukas 6
2–3

Abdi İpekçi Arena, Istanbul

June 13, 2016
20:00 EEST

Report

Fenerbahçe	91–70	Anadolu Efes
Scoring by quarter: 24–14, 28–18, 26–11, 13–27
Pts: Datome 20; Rebs: Udoh 10; Asts: Udoh 6		Pts: Diebler 18; Rebs: Dunston 7 Asts: Balbay 6
Fenerbahçe wins series 4-2

Ülker Sports Arena, Istanbul

2016 BSL Champions
Fenerbahçe
7th Title
