= 2017 BSL Playoffs =

BSL Playoffs
- Season: 2016–17
- Dates: 23 May – 16 June 2017
- Games played: 20
- Teams: 8

Finals
- Champions: Fenerbahçe(8th title)
- Runners-up: Beşiktaş Sompo Japan
- Semifinalists: Anadolu Efes; Darüşşafaka Doğuş
- Finals MVP: (Serbia) Bogdan Bogdanović
- All statistics correct as of 16 May 2019.

2017 Basketbol Süper Ligi (BSL) Playoffs was the final phase of the 2016–17 Basketbol Süper Ligi season. The playoffs started on 23 May 2017. Fenerbahçe were the defending champions.

The eight highest placed teams of the regular season qualified for the playoffs. In the quarter-finals a best-of-three was played, in the semi-finals a best-of-five and in the finals a best-of-seven playoff format was used.

Fenerbahçe competed against Beşiktaş Sompo Japan in the finals, won the series 4-0 and got their 8th championship.

== Bracket ==
Quarterfinals
1	Fenerbahçe	2
8	Tofaş	0
4	Darüşşafaka Doğuş	2
5	Banvit	0
2	Beşiktaş Sompo Japan	2
7	Gaziantep Basketbol	0
3	Anadolu Efes	2
6	Galatasaray Odeabank	1

Semifinals
1	Fenerbahçe	3
4	Darüşşafaka Doğuş	0
2	Beşiktaş Sompo Japan	3
3	Anadolu Efes	1

Finals
1	Fenerbahçe	4
2	Beşiktaş Sompo Japan	0

== Quarterfinals ==
=== Fenerbahçe vs. Tofaş ===
May 24, 2017
18:30 EEST

Report

Fenerbahçe	92–76	Tofaş
Scoring by quarter: 22–23, 22–14, 20–23, 28–16
Pts: Sloukas 13; Rebs: Düverioğlu 7 Asts: Nunnally, Bogdanović 5		Pts: Micić 13; Rebs: Palacios, Ivanov 6 Asts: Ermiş 6
1-0

Ülker Sports and Event Hall, Istanbul

May 26, 2017
20:30 EEST

Report

Tofaş	73–79	Fenerbahçe
Scoring by quarter: 19–22, 25–17, 15–18, 14–22
Pts: Ermiş 21; Rebs: Micić, Mejía 4 Asts: Ermiş 10		Pts: Mahmutoğlu 17; Rebs: Veselý 6 Asts: Three players 4
Fenerbahçe wins series 2-0

Tofaş Sports Hall, Bursa

=== Beşiktaş Sompo Japan vs. Gaziantep Basketbol ===
May 23, 2017
18:30 EEST

Report

Beşiktaş Sompo Japan	66–57	Gaziantep Basketbol
Scoring by quarter: 23–17, 16–17, 13–16, 14–7
Pts: Strawberry 15; Rebs: Štimac 11; Asts: Four players 2		Pts: Denmon 18; Rebs: Cherry 12; Asts: Rautins 5
1-0

Akatlar Arena, Istanbul

May 25, 2017
18:30 EEST

Report

Gaziantep Basketbol	70–77	Beşiktaş Sompo Japan
Scoring by quarter: 20–15, 13–19, 16–14, 21–29
Pts: Denmon, Haislip 20; Rebs: Rautins 9 Asts: Cherry 7		Pts: Clark 21; Rebs: Štimac, Clark 8 Asts: Strawberry, Roll 5
Beşiktaş Sompo Japan wins series 2-0

Karataş Şahinbey Sport Hall, Gaziantep

=== Anadolu Efes vs. Galatasaray Odeabank ===
May 23, 2017
20:30 EEST

Report

Anadolu Efes	95–85	Galatasaray Odeabank
Scoring by quarter: 21–26, 20–15, 27–22, 27–22
Pts: Granger 20; Rebs: Honeycutt 10; Asts: Heurtel 10		Pts: McCollum 20; Rebs: Pleiß 6 Asts: Schilb 8
1-0

Abdi İpekçi Arena, Istanbul

May 25, 2017
20:30 EEST

Report

Galatasaray Odeabank	73–63	Anadolu Efes
Scoring by quarter: 19–18, 19–15, 13–11, 22–19
Pts: Micov 18; Rebs: Pleiß 10; Asts: Güler 5		Pts: Dunston 15; Rebs: Honeycutt 9 Asts: Heurtel 9
1-1

Abdi İpekçi Arena, Istanbul

May 27, 2017
20:00 EEST

Report

Anadolu Efes	87–76	Galatasaray Odeabank
Scoring by quarter: 24–17, 24–23, 21–15, 18–21
Pts: Brown 22; Rebs: Brown, Honeycutt 7 Asts: Granger 9		Pts: McCollum 32; Rebs: Pleiß 6 Asts: Three players 3
Anadolu Efes wins series 2-1

Abdi İpekçi Arena, Istanbul

=== Darüşşafaka Doğuş vs. Banvit ===
May 24, 2017
18:30 EEST

Report

Darüşşafaka Doğuş	72–67	Banvit
Scoring by quarter: 20–15, 16–17, 22–11, 14–24
Pts: Wanamaker 22; Rebs: Clyburn 11; Asts: Wilbekin 4		Pts: Korkmaz 18; Rebs: Vidmar 14; Asts: Theodore 8
1-0

Volkswagen Arena, Istanbul

May 26, 2017
18:30 EEST

Report

Banvit	70–74	Darüşşafaka Doğuş
Scoring by quarter: 18–13, 21–16, 16–24, 15–21
Pts: Theodore 18; Rebs: Orelik 9 Asts: Theodore 10		Pts: Wanamaker 20; Rebs: Clyburn 8 Asts: Wanamaker 5
Darüşşafaka Doğuş wins series 2-0

Kara Ali Acar Sport Hall, Istanbul

== Semifinals ==
=== Fenerbahçe vs. Darüşşafaka Doğuş ===
May 29, 2017
20:00 EEST

Report

Fenerbahçe	94–72	Darüşşafaka Doğuş
Scoring by quarter: 24–26, 26–16, 22–15, 22–15
Pts: Mahmutoğlu 18; Rebs: Three players 4 Asts: Sloukas 7		Pts: Clyburn, Wilbekin 16; Rebs: Anderson 8 Asts: Anderson, Wanamaker 4
1-0

Ülker Sports and Event Hall, Istanbul

May 31, 2017
20:00 EEST

Report

Fenerbahçe	95–81	Darüşşafaka Doğuş
Scoring by quarter: 24–26, 34–17, 16–24, 21–14
Pts: Bogdanović 18; Rebs: Udoh 10; Asts: Dixon 6		Pts: Wanamaker 21; Rebs: Clyburn, Aldemir 7 Asts: Anderson 6
2-0

Ülker Sports and Event Hall, Istanbul

June 2, 2017
20:00 EEST

Report

Darüşşafaka Doğuş	74–90	Fenerbahçe
Scoring by quarter: 14–26, 21–20, 18–12, 21–32
Pts: Anderson 21; Rebs: Clyburn 8 Asts: Clyburn, Wanamaker 5		Pts: Bogdanović 19; Rebs: Udoh 8 Asts: Bogdanović 5
Fenerbahçe wins series 3-0

Volkswagen Arena, Istanbul

=== Beşiktaş Sompo Japan vs. Anadolu Efes ===
May 30, 2017
20:00 EEST

Report

Beşiktaş Sompo Japan	90–71	Anadolu Efes
Scoring by quarter: 22–25, 26–8, 15–18, 27–20
Pts: Strawberry 22; Rebs: Veyseloğlu 8 Asts: Roll 5		Pts: Balbay, Heurtel 15; Rebs: Brown 9 Asts: Granger 5
1-0

Akatlar Arena, Istanbul

June 1, 2017
20:00 EEST

Report

Beşiktaş Sompo Japan	74–72	Anadolu Efes
Scoring by quarter: 17–18, 20–13, 17–20, 20–21
Pts: Thompson 20; Rebs: Štimac 10; Asts: Roll 5		Pts: Granger 22; Rebs: Osman 8 Asts: Heurtel 4
2-0

Akatlar Arena, Istanbul

June 3, 2017
20:00 EEST

Report

Anadolu Efes	66–65	Beşiktaş Sompo Japan
Scoring by quarter: 23–19, 13–16, 15–17, 15–13
Pts: Brown 23; Rebs: Osman, Dunston 9 Asts: Heurtel 5		Pts: Štimac, Roll 12; Rebs: Štimac 8 Asts: Thompson 6
1-2

Abdi İpekçi Arena, Istanbul

June 6, 2017
20:00 EEST

Report

Anadolu Efes	65–91	Beşiktaş Sompo Japan
Scoring by quarter: 16–26, 17–26, 9–18, 23–21
Pts: Heurtel 15; Rebs: Paul, Dunston 7 Asts: Heurtel 5		Pts: Roll 22; Rebs: Štimac 12; Asts: Three players 4
Beşiktaş Sompo Japan wins series 3-1

Abdi İpekçi Arena, Istanbul

== Finals ==
=== Fenerbahçe vs. Beşiktaş Sompo Japan ===
June 9, 2017
20:00 EEST

Report

Fenerbahçe	75–69	Beşiktaş Sompo Japan
Scoring by quarter: 18–22, 24–11, 10–16, 23–20
Pts: Dixon 16; Rebs: Veselý 8 Asts: Veselý 5		Pts: Štimac 20; Rebs: Štimac 11; Asts: Strawberry 5
1-0

Ülker Sports and Event Hall, Istanbul

June 11, 2017
18:00 EEST

Report

Fenerbahçe	83–74	Beşiktaş Sompo Japan
Scoring by quarter: 17–19, 22–17, 19–13, 25–25
Pts: Bogdanović 19; Rebs: Udoh 10; Asts: Bogdanović 7		Pts: Roll 16; Rebs: Štimac 11; Asts: Strawberry 5
2-0

Ülker Sports and Event Hall, Istanbul

June 14, 2017
20:00 EEST

Report

Beşiktaş Sompo Japan	80–86 ()	Fenerbahçe
Scoring by quarter: 16–22, 20–14, 18–17, 20–21, Overtime: 6–12
Pts: Strawberry 22; Rebs: Štimac 9 Asts: Roll, Weems 3		Pts: Veselý 26; Rebs: Veselý 11; Asts: Bogdanović 9
0-3

Akatlar Arena, Istanbul

June 16, 2017
20:00 EEST

Report

Beşiktaş Sompo Japan	94–98 ()	Fenerbahçe
Scoring by quarter: 19–24, 28–18, 17–17, 20–25, Overtime: 10–14
Pts: Sipahi 22; Rebs: Štimac 9 Asts: Roll 6		Pts: Bogdanović 23; Rebs: Udoh 12; Asts: Kalinić 6
Fenerbahçe wins series 4-0

Akatlar Arena, Istanbul

2017 BSL Champions
Fenerbahçe Ülker
8th Title
