= 2018 BSL Playoffs =

BSL Playoffs
- Season: 2017–18
- Dates: 22 May – 13 June 2018
- Games played: 20
- Teams: 8

Finals
- Champions: Fenerbahçe Doğuş(9th title)
- Runners-up: Tofaş
- Semifinalists: Anadolu Efes; Banvit
- Finals MVP: (United States) Brad Wanamaker
- All statistics correct as of 16 May 2019.

2018 Basketbol Süper Ligi (BSL) Playoffs was the final phase of the 2017–18 Basketbol Süper Ligi season. The playoffs started on 22 May 2018. Fenerbahçe Doğuş were the defending champions.

The eight highest placed teams of the regular season qualified for the playoffs. In the quarter-finals a best-of-three was played, in the semi-finals a best-of-five and in the finals a best-of-seven playoff format was used.

Fenerbahçe Doğuş competed against Tofaş in the finals, won the series 4-1 and got their 9th championship.

== Bracket ==
Quarterfinals
1	Fenerbahçe Doğuş	2
8	Sakarya BB	0
4	Beşiktaş Sompo Japan	0
5	Banvit	2
2	Tofaş	2
7	Eskişehir	0
3	Anadolu Efes	2
6	Darüşşafaka	0

Semifinals
1	Fenerbahçe Doğuş	3
5	Banvit	0
2	Tofaş	3
3	Anadolu Efes	1

Finals
1	Fenerbahçe Doğuş	4
2	Tofaş	1

== Quarterfinals ==
=== Fenerbahçe Doğuş vs. Sakarya BB ===
May 23, 2018
20:45 EEST

Report

Fenerbahçe Doğuş	81–66	Sakarya BB
Scoring by quarter: 23–20, 21–10, 15–24, 22–12
Pts: Melli, Nunnally 15; Rebs: Melli 6 Asts: Sloukas 7		Pts: Clavell 16; Rebs: Boothe 8 Asts: Jones 6
1-0

Ülker Sports and Event Hall, Istanbul

May 25, 2018
18:15 EEST

Report

Sakarya BB	54–77	Fenerbahçe Doğuş
Scoring by quarter: 15–20, 13–18, 14–18, 12–21
Pts: Jones 11; Rebs: Fall 7 Asts: Fall, Jones 3		Pts: Datome 20; Rebs: Düverioğlu 8 Asts: Gudurić 4
Fenerbahçe Doğuş wins series 2-0

Sakarya Sports Hall, Sakarya

=== Tofaş vs. Eskişehir ===
May 22, 2018
20:45 EEST

Report

Tofaş	85–58	Eskişehir
Scoring by quarter: 30–17, 21–16, 21–13, 13–12
Pts: Morgan, Crocker 16; Rebs: Kadji 10; Asts: Mejía, Henry 7		Pts: Marshall 13; Rebs: Duncan 10; Asts: Baron 5
1-0

Tofaş Sports Hall, Bursa

May 24, 2018
18:15 EEST

Report

Eskişehir	98–99 (OT)	Tofaş
Scoring by quarter: 26–20, 21–24, 21–14, 17–27, Overtime: 13–14
Pts: Baron 26; Rebs: Ayres 12; Asts: Baron 6		Pts: Mejia 26; Rebs: Henry 9 Asts: Henry 8
Tofaş wins series 2-0

Anadolu Üniversitesi Sport Hall, Eskişehir

=== Anadolu Efes vs. Darüşşafaka ===
May 22, 2018
18:15 EEST

Report

Anadolu Efes	78–69	Darüşşafaka
Scoring by quarter: 19–15, 21–16, 17–22, 21–16
Pts: Weems 25; Rebs: Dunston 11; Asts: Balbay 7		Pts: Johnson 13; Rebs: Eric 8 Asts: Wilbekin 5
1-0

Sinan Erdem Dome, Istanbul

May 24, 2018
20:45 EEST

Report

Darüşşafaka	78–79	Anadolu Efes
Scoring by quarter: 12–23, 20–19, 23–20, 23–17
Pts: Wilbekin 29; Rebs: Eric 10; Asts: Sant-Roos 6		Pts: Weems 24; Rebs: Simon 12; Asts: Balbay 6
Anadolu Efes wins series 2-0

Volkswagen Arena, Istanbul

=== Beşiktaş Sompo Japan vs. Banvit ===
May 23, 2018
18:15 EEST

Report

Beşiktaş Sompo Japan	77–79	Banvit
Scoring by quarter: 25–23, 20–24, 15–17, 17–15
Pts: Strawberry 21; Rebs: Clark, Sipahi 5 Asts: Sipahi 4		Pts: Caloiaro 17; Rebs: Kulig 7 Asts: Caloiaro 6
1-0

Akatlar Arena, Istanbul

May 25, 2018
20:45 EEST

Report

Banvit	83–75	Beşiktaş Sompo Japan
Scoring by quarter: 19–13, 17–16, 22–24, 25–22
Pts: Kulig 23; Rebs: Caloiaro 11; Asts: Taylor 10		Pts: Strawberry 21; Rebs: Clark 8 Asts: Strawberry 5
Banvit wins series 2-0

Banvit Kara Ali Acar Sport Hall, Bandırma

== Semifinals ==
=== Fenerbahçe Doğuş vs. Banvit ===
May 28, 2018
20:45 EEST

Report

Fenerbahçe Doğuş	86–81	Banvit
Scoring by quarter: 23–20, 21–10, 15–24, 22–12
Pts: Nunnally 22; Rebs: Melli 8 Asts: Melli 8		Pts: Caloiaro 29; Rebs: Caloiaro, Rautins 5 Asts: Taylor 7
1-0

Ülker Sports and Event Hall, Istanbul

May 30, 2018
20:45 EEST

Report

Fenerbahçe Doğuş	98–93 ()	Banvit
Scoring by quarter: 18–15, 20–21, 22–20, 20–24, Overtime: 18–13
Pts: Wanamaker 24; Rebs: Veselý 7 Asts: Sloukas 7		Pts: Rautins 22; Rebs: Rautins 8 Asts: Vidmar 7
2-0

Ülker Sports and Event Hall, Istanbul

June 1, 2018
20:45 EEST

Report

Banvit	73–84	Fenerbahçe Doğuş
Scoring by quarter: 16–27, 14–21, 20–16, 23–20
Pts: Kulig 28; Rebs: Kulig, Caloiaro 4 Asts: Rautins 6		Pts: Wanamaker 16; Rebs: Thompson 7 Asts: Sloukas 6
Fenerbahçe Doğuş wins series 3-0

Banvit Kara Ali Acar Sport Hall, Bandırma

=== Tofaş vs. Anadolu Efes ===
May 27, 2018
18:15 EEST

Report

Tofaş	91–63	Anadolu Efes
Scoring by quarter: 27–17, 23–25, 28–11, 13–10
Pts: Crocker 16; Rebs: Kadji 6 Asts: Three players 5		Pts: Dunston 14; Rebs: Dunston 5 Asts: Motum 2
1-0

Tofaş Sports Hall, Bursa

May 29, 2018
20:45 EEST

Report

Tofaş	89–82	Anadolu Efes
Scoring by quarter: 23–25, 25–18, 18–15, 23–24
Pts: Henry 22; Rebs: Henry 8 Asts: Henry 9		Pts: Batuk 22; Rebs: Dunston 8 Asts: Simon 10
2-0

Tofaş Sports Hall, Bursa

May 31, 2018
20:45 EEST

Report

Anadolu Efes	94–88	Tofaş
Scoring by quarter: 24–19, 24–18, 17–19, 29–32
Pts: McCollum 34; Rebs: Simon 11; Asts: Balbay 7		Pts: Crocker 31; Rebs: Owens 6 Asts: Ermiş 10
1-2

Sinan Erdem Dome, Istanbul

June 2, 2018
18:15 EEST

Report

Anadolu Efes	70–76	Tofaş
Scoring by quarter: 16–19, 17–19, 22–22, 15–16
Pts: McCollum 15; Rebs: Dunston 11; Asts: Balbay 5		Pts: Morgan 22; Rebs: Morgan 9 Asts: Ermiş, Henry 4
Tofaş wins series 3-1

Sinan Erdem Dome, Istanbul

== Finals ==
=== Fenerbahçe Doğuş vs. Tofaş ===
June 5, 2018
21:00 EEST

Report

Fenerbahçe Doğuş	103–63	Tofaş
Scoring by quarter: 21–15, 26–15, 33–12, 23–21
Pts: Wanamaker 17; Rebs: Melli, Düverioğlu 8 Asts: Sloukas 6		Pts: Ermiş 13; Rebs: Durmaz 5 Asts: Arslan 4
1-0

Ülker Sports and Event Hall, Istanbul

June 7, 2018
21:00 EEST

Report

Fenerbahçe Doğuş	86–78	Tofaş
Scoring by quarter: 19–17, 18–19, 26–15, 23–27
Pts: Wanamaker 18; Rebs: Veselý 5 Asts: Güler 6		Pts: Three players 16; Rebs: Mejía 5 Asts: Henry 9
2-0

Ülker Sports and Event Hall, Istanbul

June 9, 2018
19:00 EEST

Report

Tofaş	91–88	Fenerbahçe Doğuş
Scoring by quarter: 26–26, 26–23, 16–18, 23–21
Pts: Mejía 23; Rebs: Henry 7 Asts: Henry, Crocker 8		Pts: Wanamaker 20; Rebs: Thompson 7 Asts: Wanamaker 6
1-2

Tofaş Sports Hall, Bursa

June 11, 2018
21:00 EEST

Report

Tofaş	77–95	Fenerbahçe Doğuş
Scoring by quarter: 17–22, 22–28, 21–21, 17–24
Pts: Henry 21; Rebs: Owens, Kadji 6 Asts: Henry 10		Pts: Datome 25; Rebs: Melli 5 Asts: Veselý, Sloukas 5
1-3

Tofaş Sports Hall, Bursa

June 13, 2018
21:00 EEST

Report

Fenerbahçe Doğuş	94–64	Tofaş
Scoring by quarter: 25–12, 20–14, 24–22, 25–16
Pts: Düverioğlu 19; Rebs: Düverioğlu 9 Asts: Sloukas 8		Pts: Henry 17; Rebs: Durmaz 8 Asts: Henry 9
Fenerbahçe Doğuş wins series 4-1

Ülker Sports and Event Hall, Istanbul

2018 BSL Champions
Fenerbahçe Doğuş
9th Title
