= 2014 TBL Playoffs =

TBL Playoffs
- Season: 2013–14
- Dates: 12 May – 19 June 2014
- Games played: 24
- Teams: 8

Finals
- Champions: Fenerbahçe ülker (6th title)
- Runners-up: Galatasaray Liv Hospital
- Semi-finalists: Banvit; Pınar Karşıyaka
- All statistics correct as of 16 May 2019.

2014 TBL Playoffs was the final phase of the 2013–14 Turkish Basketball League. It started on 12 May 2014. Galatasaray Liv Hospital were the defending champions. When the final series was tied 3-3, Galatasaray Liv Hospital announced they would not appear in game seven due to a referee assignment they weren't satisfied with. Therefore, Fenerbahçe Ülker won their 6th title.

== Bracket ==
Quarterfinals
1	Banvit	2
8	Tofaş	0
4	Galatasaray Liv Hospital	2
5	Beşiktaş İntegral Forex	1
2	Fenerbahçe Ülker	2
7	Uşak Sportif	0
3	Anadolu Efes	1
6	Pınar Karşıyaka	2

Semifinals
1	Banvit	1
4	Galatasaray Liv Hospital	3
2	Fenerbahçe Ülker	3
6	Pınar Karşıyaka	0

Finals
4	Galatasaray Liv Hospital	3
2	Fenerbahçe Ülker	4

== Quarterfinals ==
=== Banvit vs. Tofaş ===
May 13, 2014
18:30 EEST

Report

Banvit	82–78	Tofaş
Scoring by quarter: 15–17, 24–23, 19–19, 24–19
Pts: Mejia 27; Rebs: Mejia 9 Asts: Rowland 4		Pts: Şenli 15; Rebs: Elonu, Balažič 6 Asts: Büker 11
1-0

Banvit Kara Ali Acar Sport Hall, Bandırma
Attendance: 3,000
Referees: Rüştü Nuran, Ziya Özorhon, Mehmet Şahin

May 17, 2014
18:00 EEST

Report

Tofaş	77–78	Banvit
Scoring by quarter: 22–17, 19–19, 17–24, 19–18
Pts: Elonu 15; Rebs: Elonu 10; Asts: Büker 9		Pts: Mejia 19; Rebs: Simmons, Davis 9 Asts: Mejia 4
Banvit wins series 2-0

Bursa Atatürk Sport Hall, Bursa
Referees: Zafer Yılmaz, Yener Yılmaz, Mehmet Karabilecen

=== Fenerbahçe Ülker vs. Uşak Sportif ===
May 12, 2014
20:45 EEST

Report

Fenerbahçe Ülker	87–75	Uşak Sportif
Scoring by quarter: 23–24, 23–12, 19–25, 22–14
Pts: Žorić, Bogdanović 19; Rebs: Žorić, Bjelica 7 Asts: Preldžić 5		Pts: Carter 19; Rebs: Holman 12; Asts: Warren 4
1-0

Ülker Sports Arena, Istanbul
Referees: Murat Biricik, Halil Baldemir, Semih Vural

May 18, 2014
15:00 EEST

Report

Uşak Sportif	62–100	Fenerbahçe Ülker
Scoring by quarter: 18–25, 12–19, 12–29, 20–27
Pts: Holman 17; Rebs: Three players 3 Asts: Warren 3		Pts: Bogdanović 18; Rebs: Savaş 9 Asts: Three players 3
Fenerbahçe Ülker wins series 2-0

Uşak Atatürk Sport Hall, Uşak
Referees: Mehmet Keseratar, Aytuğ Ekti, Mehmet Serdar Ünal

=== Anadolu Efes vs. Pınar Karşıyaka ===
May 12, 2014
18:30 EEST

Report

Anadolu Efes	96–90	Pınar Karşıyaka
Scoring by quarter: 26–17, 23–21, 29–26, 18–26
Pts: Bjelica 24; Rebs: Three players 4 Asts: Planinić 7		Pts: Batista 25; Rebs: Batista 16; Asts: Dixon 5
1-0

Abdi İpekçi Arena, Istanbul
Referees: Recep Ankaralı, Kaan Büyükçil, İbrahim Altıntaş

May 16, 2014
20:00 EEST

Report

Pınar Karşıyaka	65–64	Anadolu Efes
Scoring by quarter: 15–10, 17–15, 13–18, 20–21
Pts: Hersek 17; Rebs: Batista, Diebler 8 Asts: Dixon 5		Pts: Savanović 15; Rebs: Gönlüm 10; Asts: Savanović, Planinić 3
1-1

Karşıyaka Arena, İzmir
Referees: Emin Moğulkoç, İsmail Aydın, Alper Altuğ Köselerli

May 19, 2014
19:00 EEST

Report

Anadolu Efes	67–73	Pınar Karşıyaka
Scoring by quarter: 14–18, 23–17, 15–23, 15–15
Pts: Planinić 14; Rebs: Gönlüm, Balbay 5 Asts: Planinić, Gordon 6		Pts: Dixon 14; Rebs: Batista 11; Asts: Dixon 8
Pınar Karşıyaka wins series 2-1

Abdi İpekçi Arena, Istanbul
Referees: Mehmet Keseratar, Murat Biricik, Fatih Arslanoğlu

=== Galatasaray Liv Hospital vs. Beşiktaş İntegral Forex ===
May 13, 2014
20:45 EEST

Report

Galatasaray Liv Hospital	70–72	Beşiktaş İntegral Forex
Scoring by quarter: 23–20, 22–13, 22–19, 13–20
Pts: Erceg 22; Rebs: Erceg 8 Asts: Arslan 4		Pts: Lofton 24; Rebs: Yağmur 6 Asts: Perkins 8
0-1

Abdi İpekçi Arena, Istanbul
Referees: Engin Kennerman, Fatih Arslanoğlu, Ali Şakacı

May 17, 2014
14:00 EEST

Report

Beşiktaş İntegral Forex	64–66	Galatasaray Liv Hospital
Scoring by quarter: 11–10, 20–20, 19–21, 14–15
Pts: Bajramović 15; Rebs: Yağmur 6 Asts: Lofton 4		Pts: Mensah-Bonsu 17; Rebs: Aldemir 7 Asts: Arroyo 11
1-1

BJK Akatlar Arena, Istanbul
Referees: Fatih Söylemezoğlu, Halil Baldemir, Osman Sinan İşgüder

May 20, 2014
20:00 EEST

Report

Galatasaray Liv Hospital	78–65	Beşiktaş İntegral Forex
Scoring by quarter: 22–11, 21–19, 17–18, 18–17
Pts: Güler 15; Rebs: Mensah-Bonsu 11; Asts: Arroyo 8		Pts: Lofton 24; Rebs: Bajramović, Perkins 5 Asts: Yağmur 4
Galatasaray Liv Hospital wins series 2-1

Abdi İpekçi Arena, Istanbul
Referees: Recep Ankaralı, Zafer Yılmaz, Ziya Özorhon

== Semifinals ==
=== Banvit vs. Galatasaray Liv Hospital ===
May 23, 2014
19:00 EEST

Report

Banvit	57–67	Galatasaray Liv Hospital
Scoring by quarter: 12–19, 17–20, 20–15, 8–13
Pts: Rowland 15; Rebs: Rowland 7 Asts: Rowland 5		Pts: Arroyo, Güler 13; Rebs: Erceg 8 Asts: Arroyo 5
0-1

Banvit Kara Ali Acar Sport Hall, Bandırma
Referees: Mehmet Keseratar, Murat Biricik, Alper Altuğ Köselerli

May 25, 2014
18:00 EEST

Report

Banvit	69–67	Galatasaray Liv Hospital
Scoring by quarter: 13–17, 21–14, 21–19, 14–17
Pts: Rowland 18; Rebs: Three players 5 Asts: Rowland 6		Pts: Arroyo 19; Rebs: Dudley 7 Asts: Three players 2
1-1

Banvit Kara Ali Acar Sport Hall, Bandırma
Referees: Emin Moğulkoç, Ahmet Ersan Ergüler, Ali Şakacı

May 28, 2014
20:00 EEST

Report

Galatasaray Liv Hospital	76–71	Banvit
Scoring by quarter: 21–23, 17–14, 9–15, 29–19
Pts: Arroyo 19; Rebs: Dudley 15; Asts: Arroyo 6		Pts: Rowland, Alade Aminu 14; Rebs: Mejia 7 Asts: Rowland 6
2-1

Abdi İpekçi Arena, Istanbul
Referees: Engin Kennerman, Fatih Arslanoğlu, Osman Sinan İşgüder

May 30, 2014
20:00 EEST

Report

Galatasaray Liv Hospital	73–66	Banvit
Scoring by quarter: 18–20, 10–22, 23–11, 22–13
Pts: Markoishvili 19; Rebs: Erceg, Dudley 8 Asts: Güler 6		Pts: Mejia 13; Rebs: Mejia, Veyseloğlu 6 Asts: Rowland 4
Galatasaray Liv Hospital wins series 3-1

Abdi İpekçi Arena, Istanbul
Referees: Recep Ankaralı, Rüştü Nuran, Ziya Özorhon

=== Fenerbahçe Ülker vs. Pınar Karşıyaka ===
May 22, 2014
21:00 EEST

Report

Fenerbahçe Ülker	88–69	Pınar Karşıyaka
Scoring by quarter: 20–18, 16–16, 23–19, 29–16
Pts: Kleiza 17; Rebs: Three player 5 Asts: McCalebb 9		Pts: Diebler 18; Rebs: Batista 8 Asts: Dixon 5
1-0

Ülker Sports Arena, Istanbul
Referees: Fatih Söylemezoğlu, Halil Baldemir, Mehmet Serdar Ünal

May 24, 2014
17:00 EEST

Report

Fenerbahçe Ülker	94–83	Pınar Karşıyaka
Scoring by quarter: 24–29, 20–16, 28–18, 22–20
Pts: Bogdanović 22; Rebs: Bogdanović 7 Asts: McCalebb 9		Pts: Altıntığ 32; Rebs: Dixon 7 Asts: Altıntığ, Diebler 4
2-0

Ülker Sports Arena, Istanbul
Referees: Rüştü Nuran, Aytuğ Ekti, Mehmet Karabilecen

May 27, 2014
20:00 EEST

Report

Pınar Karşıyaka	67–74	Fenerbahçe Ülker
Scoring by quarter: 21–21, 12–15, 17–19, 17–19
Pts: Batista 18; Rebs: Batista 12; Asts: Dixon 5		Pts: Bogdanović 19; Rebs: Preldžić, Bjelica 4 Asts: Preldžić 7
Fenerbahçe Ülker wins series 3-0

Karşıyaka Arena, İzmir
Referees: Recep Ankaralı, Zafer Yılmaz, Mehmet Şahin

== Finals ==
=== Fenerbahçe Ülker vs. Galatasaray Liv Hospital ===
June 3, 2014
21:00 EEST

Report

Fenerbahçe Ülker	89–70	Galatasaray Liv Hospital
Scoring by quarter: 26–15, 26–20, 14–16, 23–19
Pts: McCalebb 15; Rebs: Bjelica 10; Asts: McCalebb, Preldžić 6		Pts: Atsür 11; Rebs: Mensah-Bonsu 6 Asts: Arroyo 7
1-0

Ülker Sports Arena, Istanbul
Attendance: 13,800
Referees: Fatih Söylemezoğlu, Engin Kennerman, Murat Biricik

June 5, 2014
21:00 EEST

Report

Fenerbahçe Ülker	74–73	Galatasaray Liv Hospital
Scoring by quarter: 13–18, 21–16, 19–22, 21–17
Pts: McCalebb, Žorić 15; Rebs: Bjelica 6 Asts: McCalebb 5		Pts: Markoishvili 24; Rebs: Erceg 8 Asts: Arroyo 5
2-0

Ülker Sports Arena, Istanbul
Attendance: 13,800
Referees: Recep Ankaralı, Rüştü Nuran, Mehmet Karabilecen

June 8, 2014
19:00 EEST

Report

Galatasaray Liv Hospital	73–64	Fenerbahçe Ülker
Scoring by quarter: 15–13, 21–21, 19–21, 18–9
Pts: Erceg 17; Rebs: Erceg 8 Asts: Arslan 5		Pts: Bjelica 17; Rebs: Bjelica 10; Asts: Preldžić 4
1-2

Abdi İpekçi Arena, Istanbul
Attendance: 12,270
Referees: Mehmet Keseratar, Emin Moğulkoç, Zafer Yılmaz

June 10, 2014
20:00 EEST

Report

Galatasaray Liv Hospital	88–82	Fenerbahçe Ülker
Scoring by quarter: 28–16, 12–22, 21–11, 27–33
Pts: Arroyo 24; Rebs: Güler 6 Asts: Arroyo 5		Pts: Kleiza, McCalebb 22; Rebs: McCalebb 7 Asts: Preldžić 6
2-2

Abdi İpekçi Arena, Istanbul
Attendance: 12,270
Referees: Fatih Söylemezoğlu, Murat Biricik, Fatih Arslanoğlu

June 13, 2014
21:00 EEST

Report

Fenerbahçe Ülker	76–63	Galatasaray Liv Hospital
Scoring by quarter: 26–11, 19–10, 15–25, 16–17
Pts: Bogdanović 14; Rebs: Preldžić 11; Asts: McCalebb 5		Pts: Akyol 16; Rebs: Aldemir 9 Asts: Arroyo 6
3-2

Ülker Sports Arena, Istanbul
Attendance: 13,800
Referees: Engin Kennerman, Emin Moğulkoç, Zafer Yılmaz

June 16, 2014
20:00 EEST

Report

Galatasaray Liv Hospital	85–77	Fenerbahçe Ülker
Scoring by quarter: 24–13, 16–25, 18–22, 27–17
Pts: Erceg, Arroyo 19; Rebs: Mensah-Bonsu 8 Asts: Arroyo 9		Pts: Preldžić 19; Rebs: Žorić 6 Asts: McCalebb 5
3-3

Abdi İpekçi Arena, Istanbul
Attendance: 5,000
Referees: Mehmet Keseratar, Rüştü Nuran, Ahmet Ersan Ergüler

June 19, 2014
21:00 EEST

Report

Fenerbahçe Ülker	20–0	Galatasaray Liv Hospital
Galatasaray Liv Hospital fails to show up for the game. Fenerbahçe Ülker wins the series by forfeit of Galatasaray Liv Hospital.

Ülker Sports Arena, Istanbul
Referees: Recep Ankaralı, Emin Moğulkoç, Rüştü Nuran

2014 TBL Champions
Fenerbahçe Ülker
6th Title
