= Rahim Rızvanoğlu =

Turkish basketball player (born 1986)

No. 12 – Uşak Sportif
- Position: Point guard
- League: Turkish Basketball League; EuroChallenge

Personal information
- Born: April 1, 1986 (age 40) Istanbul, Turkey
- Listed height: 6 ft 0 in (1.83 m)
- Listed weight: 160 lb (73 kg)

Career information
- Playing career: 2004–present

Career history
- 2007–2008: Pertevniyal
- 2008–2009: Tofaş
- 2010–2011: Olin Edirne
- 2011–2013: Türk Telekom
- 2013: Antalya BB
- 2013–2014: İTÜ
- 2014–present: Uşak Sportif

Rahim Rızvanoğlu (born April 1, 1986) is a Turkish professional basketball player who plays as a point guard for Uşak Sportif of the Turkish Basketball League.
