= Erdinç Balto =

Turkish basketball player (born 1990)

No. 18 – Uşak Sportif
- Position: Power forward
- League: Turkish Basketball League; EuroChallenge

Personal information
- Born: 10 February 1990 (age 36) Kadıköy, Istanbul, Turkey
- Listed height: 6 ft 9 in (2.06 m)

Career information
- Playing career: 2006–present

Career history
- 2006–2007: Pınar Karşıyaka
- 2007–2010: Türk Telekom
- 2010–2011: Antalya BB
- 2011–2012: Darüşşafaka
- 2012–present: Uşak Sportif

Erdinç Balto (born 10 February 1990) is a Turkish professional basketball player who plays as a power forward for Uşak Sportif of the Turkish Basketball League.
