= Uşak Üniversitesi Sport Hall =

Indoor arena in Uşak, Turkey

Uşak Üniversitesi Sport Hall Uşak Üniversitesi Spor Salonu
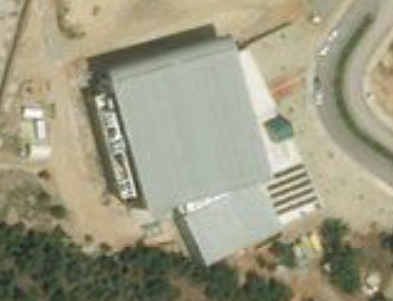
- Interactive map of Uşak Üniversitesi Sport Hall; Uşak Üniversitesi Spor Salonu
- Location: Uşak, Turkey
- Coordinates: 38.670893°N 29.327731°E
- Owner: Uşak University
- Capacity: 2,000

Construction
- Opened: 2014; 12 years ago

Tenant
- Uşak Sportif

Uşak Üniversitesi Sport Hall (Turkish: Uşak Üniversitesi Spor Salonu) is an indoor arena that is a multi-purpose sports venue. It is located in the Uşak University, in Uşak, Turkey. The main hall has a seating capacity of 2,000 spectators.

== History ==
The arena was opened in 2014. It is the home arena of Uşak Sportif, which currently plays in the Turkish Super League.
