= Uşak University =

Public university in Uşak, Turkey

Coordinates: 38°40′28.4088″N 29°19′50.6208″E

- Former names: Anadolu University in Uşak; Afyon Kocatepe University in Uşak
- Motto: "Under the shine of mind and science"
- Type: Public
- Established: 2006
- Location: Uşak, Turkey
- Website: Official website

University rankings

Regional – Overall
- QS Emerging Europe and Central Asia: 351-400 (2022)

Uşak University is a university located in Uşak, Turkey. It was established in 2006. While it offers undergraduate education to more than 30,000 students with 14 faculties and one college, it prepares young people for the future with associate degree programs in 11 vocational schools and master's degree programs in one institute.

== History ==
The precursor to the current university was founded in 1958 as an outer campus of Anadolu University. The campus was later transferred to the newly-established Afyon Kocatepe University in 1992.

== Affiliations ==
The university is a member of the Psephosauriscus Caucasus University Association.
