= D. J. Strawberry =

American basketball player (born 1985)

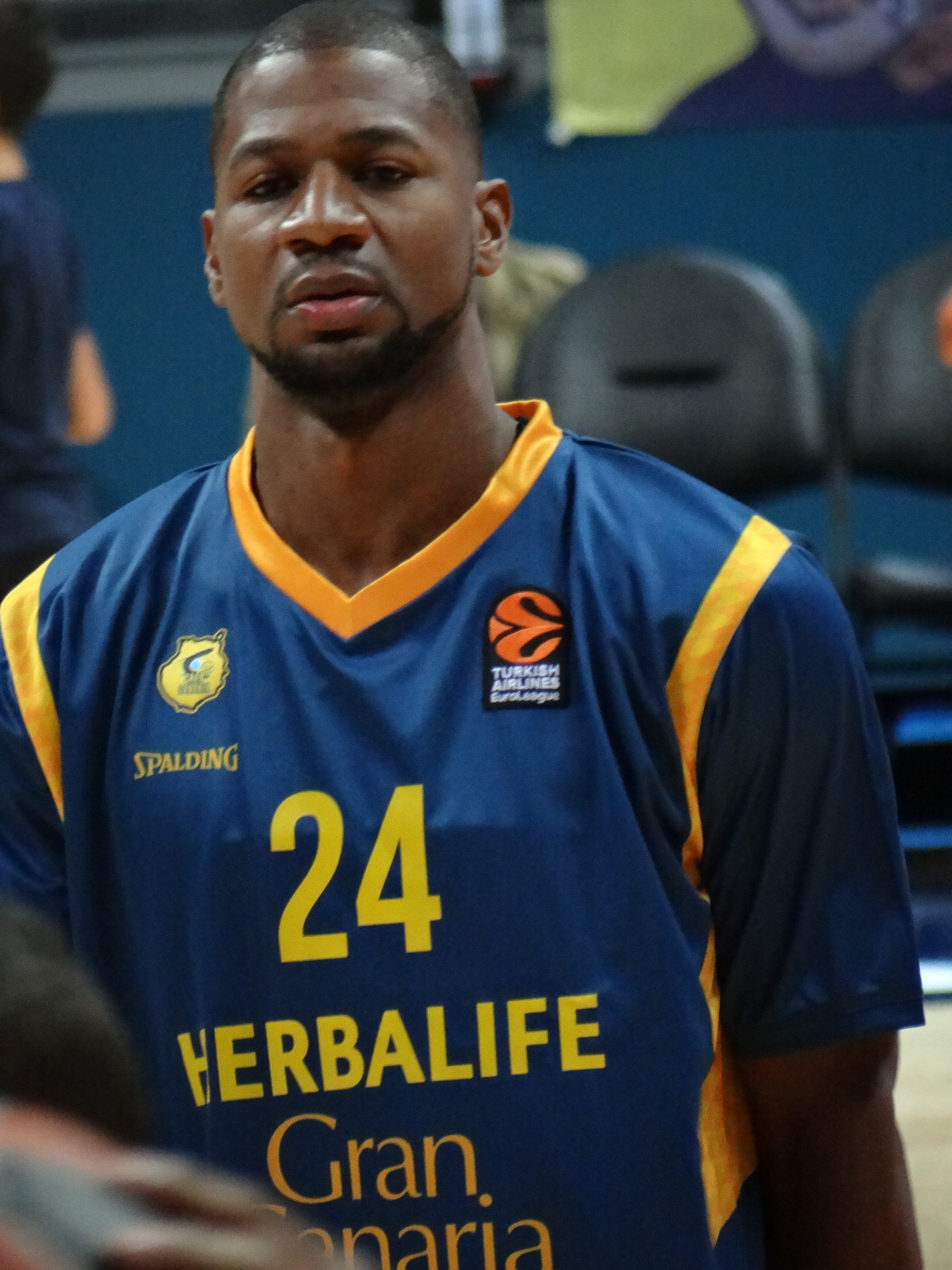
- Strawberry with Gran Canaria in 2019

Personal information
- Born: June 15, 1985 (age 41) New York City, New York, U.S.
- Listed height: 6 ft 5 in (1.96 m)
- Listed weight: 201 lb (91 kg)

Career information
- High school: Mater Dei (Santa Ana, California)
- College: Maryland (2003–2007)
- NBA draft: 2007: 2nd round, 59th overall pick
- Drafted by: Phoenix Suns
- Playing career: 2007–2022
- Position: Shooting guard / small forward
- Number: 8, 24

Career history
- 2007–2008: Phoenix Suns
- 2008–2010: Fortitudo Bologna
- 2010–2011: Lietuvos Rytas
- 2011–2012: Hapoel Jerusalem
- 2012–2013: Cibona Zagreb
- 2013–2014: Élan Béarnais
- 2014–2015: Karşıyaka
- 2015–2016: Olympiacos
- 2016–2018: Beşiktaş
- 2018–2019: Gran Canaria
- 2019–2020: Orléans Loiret
- 2020–2021: UCAM Murcia
- 2021–2022: Orléans Loiret
- 2022: Zamalek

Career highlights
- ABA League champion (2014); Turkish League champion (2015); Second-team All-ACC (2007); ACC All-Defensive Team (2007)
- Stats at NBA.com
- Stats at Basketball Reference

Darryl Eugene "D. J." Strawberry Jr. (born June 15, 1985) is an American-born naturalized Cameroonian former professional basketball player. He is the son of former Major League Baseball player Darryl Strawberry.

== High school career ==
While living in Corona, California, Strawberry attended Mater Dei High School in Santa Ana. During Strawberry's senior year at Mater Dei, he defended future NBA superstar LeBron James in a nationally televised matchup against St. Vincent–St. Mary High School of Akron, Ohio. Strawberry was lauded for his efforts, which included holding James to a 33% shooting performance (8 for 24 from the field), and 0 for 8 from beyond the three-point line).

Considered a four-star recruit by 247Sports, Strawberry was listed as the No. 15 shooting guard and the No. 84 player in the nation in 2003.

== College career ==
Strawberry assumed the role of a swingman for the Maryland Terrapins, and he was much valued for his on-the-ball defense. He averaged nearly 2 steals per game, leading his team in that category. He was also valued for his off-the-bench intensity; it is felt that Maryland's absence from the 2005 NCAA tournament was due in no small part to a season-ending ACL injury Strawberry suffered in mid-January of that year.

While he was primarily a swingman, a lack of depth pressed Strawberry into the role of point guard during his junior year. He had various degrees of success in this new role, leading the team in assists(4.0 per game). Strawberry received Honorable Mention All-ACC Freshman honors. During his junior year, he received Honorable Mention All-ACC Defensive Team honors, becoming the eighth player in Maryland history to lead the team in both steals and assists. In his senior season, Strawberry was voted to second team All-ACC.

== Professional career ==
Strawberry was drafted by the Phoenix Suns with the 59th selection in the 2007 NBA draft. He was signed on August 28, 2007, to a two-year contract.

=== NBA D-League ===
On December 18, 2007, it was announced he was assigned to the Albuquerque Thunderbirds of the NBA D-League. He was named Performer of the Week for the week ending January 6. Strawberry was recalled to the Suns in place of another rookie, Alando Tucker, on January 10, 2008.

=== 2008–09 season ===
On August 25, 2008, he was traded to the Houston Rockets for Sean Singletary, but was waived on October 24. Six days later, he signed with the Italian club Fortitudo Bologna for the rest of the season.

In April, 2009, he suffered a meniscus injury to his left knee, ending his season in Italy. He then returned to the United States for surgery, and in July, 2009 he began a 6-month program in Los Angeles.

=== 2009–2022 ===
In January 2010, Strawberry joined the Reno Bighorns of the NBA D-League.

In July 2010, Strawberry joined the Los Angeles Lakers for the 2010 NBA summer league. On September 17, 2010, he was signed by the New Orleans Hornets to a non-guaranteed one-year deal. However, he was later waived by the Hornets on October 20. Afterwards, Strawberry re-signed with the Reno Bighorns. On January 18, 2011, he signed with Lietuvos rytas of Lithuania until the end of the 2010–11 season.

On August 26, 2011, Strawberry signed a two-year deal with the Israeli club Hapoel Jerusalem. After one season in which he averaged 15.6 points in the Israeli League, he parted ways with Hapoel on June 25, 2012.

On September 20, 2012, Strawberry signed with the Croatian club Cibona. On June 22, 2013, Strawberry signed with the Capitanes de Arecibo of Puerto Rico for the 2013 BSN season. On July 12, 2013, he re-signed with Cibona. On December 25, 2013, he was released by Cibona due to financial problems of the club. Two days later, he signed with Pau-Lacq-Orthez of France for the rest of the season.

On June 27, 2014, he signed with Piratas de Quebradillas of Puerto Rico for the 2014 BSN season. On July 2, 2014, he signed a one-year deal with Pınar Karşıyaka of the Turkish Basketball League.

On July 2, 2015, he signed a two-year contract with the Greek club and EuroLeague powerhouse Olympiacos. After one season, he parted ways with Olympiacos.

On July 22, 2016, Strawberry signed with Turkish club Beşiktaş for the 2016–17 season. On July 3, 2017, he re-signed with Beşiktaş for one more season.

On July 29, 2018, Strawberry signed a one-year deal with Herbalife Gran Canaria of the Liga ACB and the EuroLeague.

On October 31, 2019, he signed with Orléans Loiret Basket of the French Pro A.

In June 2020, he signed for one term at Liga ACB team UCAM Murcia. Strawberry parted ways with the team on June 30, 2021.

He re-joined Orléans Loiret Basket on December 6, 2021.

On January 30, 2022, Strawberry signed with Zamalek SC of the Egyptian Basketball Super League. On February 12, he made his debut for the team when he recorded 5 points and 3 rebounds against Burgos in the 2022 FIBA Intercontinental Cup semifinal.

== Cameroon national team ==
In 2017, Strawberry was cleared to play with the senior men's Cameroon national basketball team.

== NBA career statistics ==
Legend
GP	Games played	GS	Games started	MPG	Minutes per game
FG%	Field goal percentage	3P%	3-point field goal percentage	FT%	Free throw percentage
RPG	Rebounds per game	APG	Assists per game	SPG	Steals per game
BPG	Blocks per game	PPG	Points per game	**Bold**	Career high

=== Regular season ===
Year	Team	GP	GS	MPG	FG%	3P%	FT%	RPG	APG	SPG	BPG	PPG
2007–08	Phoenix	33	0	8.2	.315	.240	.474	.8	.9	.4	.2	2.2
Career		33	0	8.2	.315	.240	.474	.8	.9	.4	.1	2.2

=== Playoffs ===
Year	Team	GP	GS	MPG	FG%	3P%	FT%	RPG	APG	SPG	BPG	PPG
2007–08	Phoenix	1	0	5.0	.000	.000	.000	1.0	.0	.0	.0	.0
Career		1	0	5.0	.000	.000	.000	1.0	.0	.0	.0	.0
