= Uşak Sportif =

- Founded: 2006
- Dissolved: 2018
- History: List: Uşak Üniversitesi Belediyespor (2006–2012) mackolik.com Uşak Üniv. (2012–2013) Uşak Sportif (2013–2015) Muratbey Uşak Sportif (2015–2018)
- Arena: Uşak Üniversitesi Sport Hall
- Capacity: 2,000
- Location: Uşak, Turkey
- Team colors: Red, black
- President: Ömer Özden
Home	Away

Uşak Sportif, also known as Uşak Üniversitesi Belediyespor, was a professional basketball team that is based in the city of Uşak, in Turkey. The team was founded in 2006. Their home arena was the Uşak Üniversitesi Sport Hall, which has a seating capacity of 2,000.

== History ==
The basketball brand of Uşak Sportif was founded in 2006, after the club's football section had already been active since 1984. From 2006 to 2013, the team played in the (Turkish 2nd-tier level TB2L. In the 2012–13 season, Uşak finished 1st in the regular season, and was promoted to the Turkish top-tier level TBL (now called BSL) as the league's playoffs runner-up. In the 2013–14 season, the team made its debut in the Turkish highest level league, and immediately sealed a playoffs spot. This achievement led to the European-wide league debut of Uşak in the 2014–15 season, when it participated in the European-wide 3rd-tier level EuroChallenge. In April 2015, the team became known as "Muratbey Uşak Sportif", for name sponsorship reasons.

In the 2017–18 season, Uşak relegated to the second tier Turkish Basketball First League (TBL). In August 2018, the club announced it was shutting down for the next season, as the club was unable to pay off its past debts.

== Season by season ==
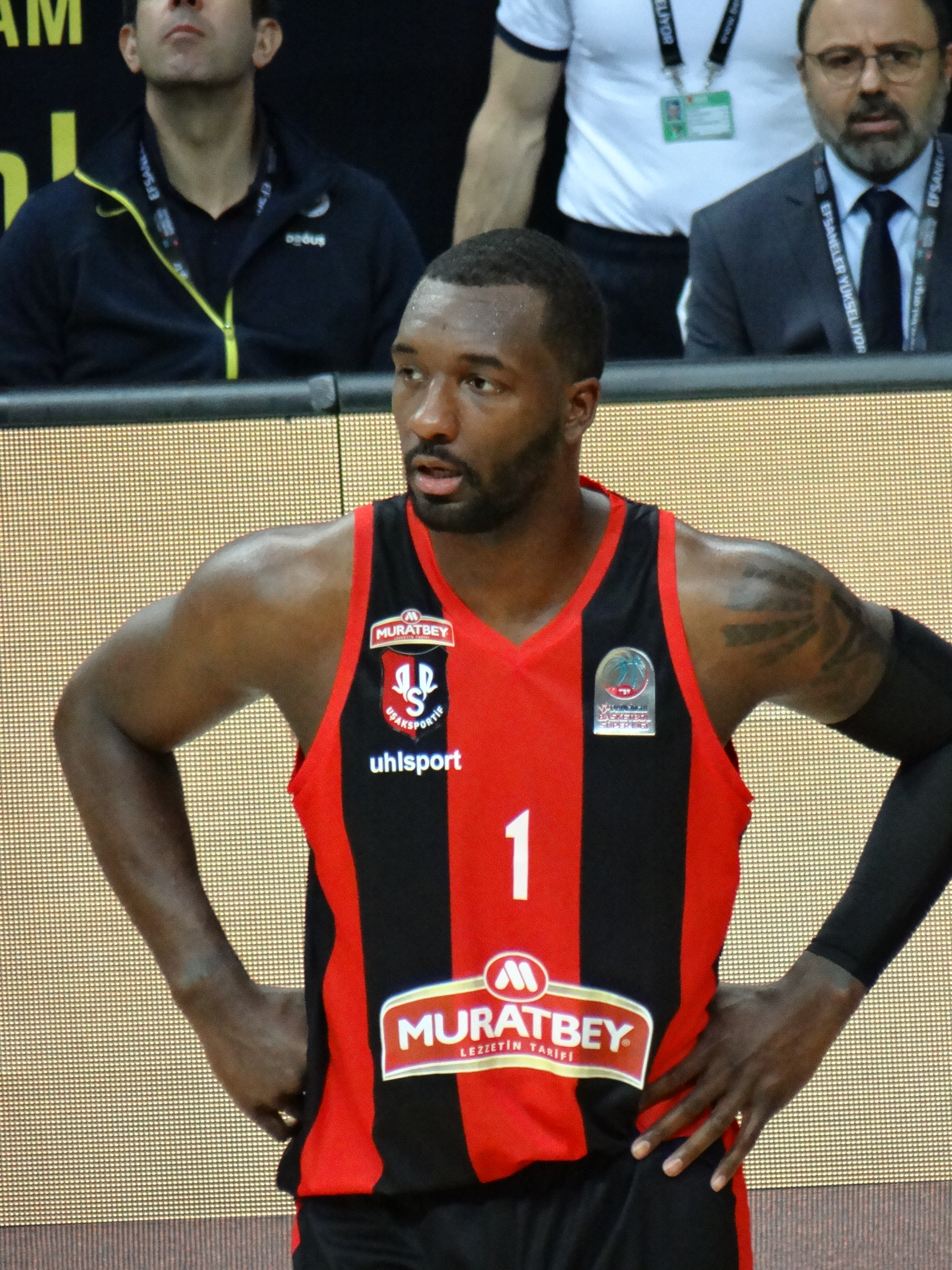
Jordan Hamilton

Season	Tier	League	Pos.	Turkish Cup	European competitions	
2005–06	3	TB3L				
2006–07	2	TB2L	6th			
2007–08	2	TB2L	4th			
2006–07	2	TB2L	6th			
2008–09	2	TB2L	10th			
2009–10	2	TB2L	5th			
2010–11	2	TB2L	4th			
2011–12	2	TB2L	13th			
2012–13	2	TB2L	2nd			
2013–14	1	TBL	7th	Group stage		
2014–15	1	TBL	13th	Group stage	3 EuroChallenge	T16
2015–16	1	BSL	7th			
2016–17	1	BSL	14th		3 Champions League	RS
2017–18	1	BSL	16th			

== Players ==
=== Notable players ===
- (Turkey) Alper Saruhan
- (Turkey) Erdinç Balto
- (Turkey) Gürol Karamahmut
- (Turkey) Rahim Rızvanoğlu
- (Turkey) Sertaç Şanlı
- (Turkey) Can Korkmaz
- (Azerbaijan) Orhan Hacıyeva
- (Czech Republic) David Jelínek
- (Kosovo) Yll Kaçaniku
- (Slovenia) Miha Zupan
- (Lithuania) Šarūnas Vasiliauskas
- (Lithuania) Evaldas Kairys
- (United States) Chris Warren
- (Canada) Khem Birch
- (United States) Paul Harris
- (United States) Courtney Fells
- (United States) Eli Holman
- (United States) Justin Carter
