= Sammy Mejía =

Dominican basketball player (born 1983)

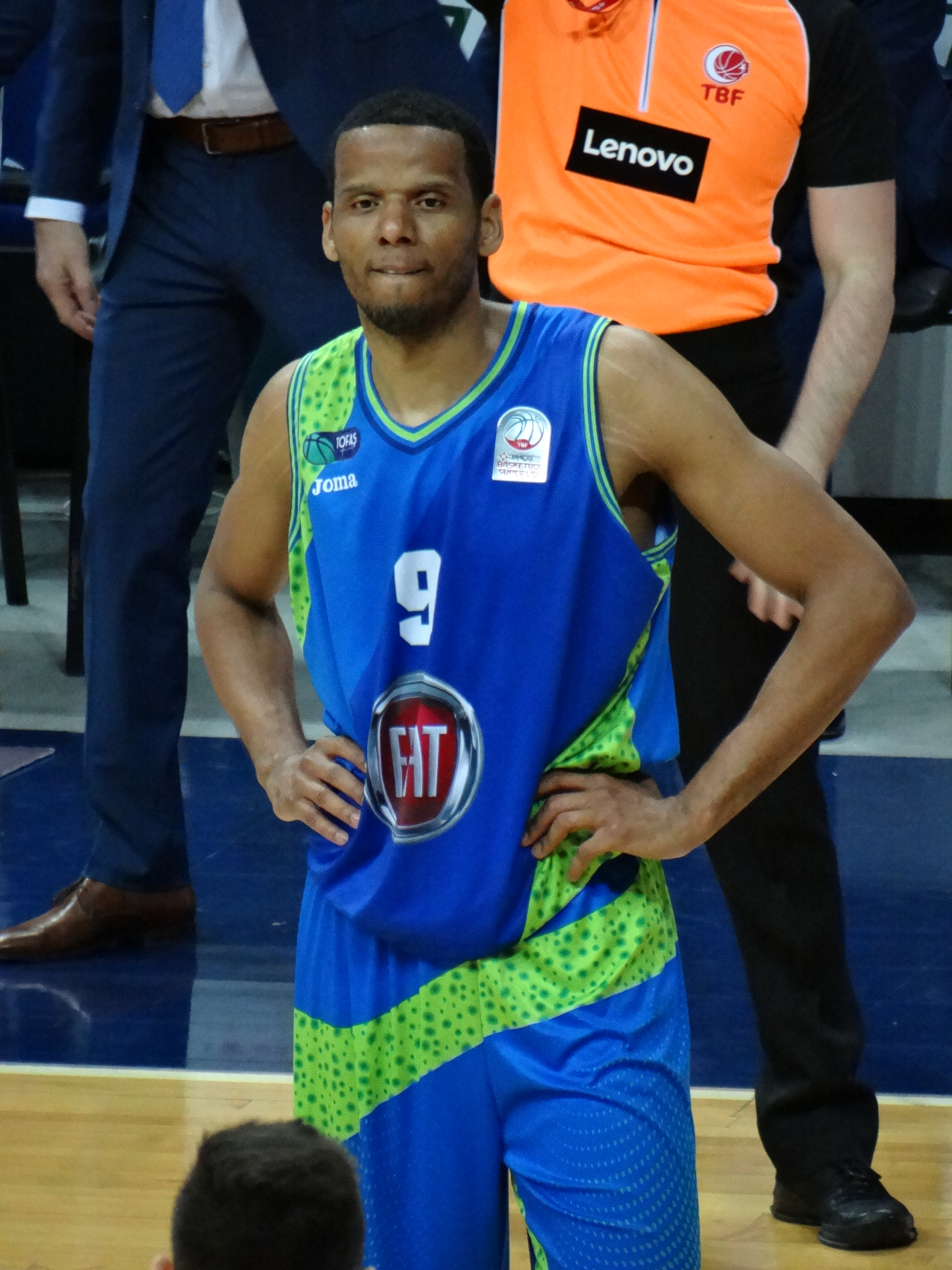
- Mejía with Tofaş in 2018

JL Bourg
- Title: Assistant coach
- League: LNB Élite

Personal information
- Born: February 7, 1983 (age 43) The Bronx, New York, U.S.
- Listed height: 6 ft 6 in (1.98 m)
- Listed weight: 195 lb (88 kg)

Career information
- High school: Theodore Roosevelt (New York, New York); Storm King School (Cornwall-on-Hudson, New York)
- College: DePaul (2003–2007)
- NBA draft: 2007: 2nd round, 57th overall pick
- Drafted by: Detroit Pistons
- Playing career: 2007–2020
- Position: Small forward / shooting guard
- Number: 9, 11, 17

Career history

Playing
- 2007–2008: Fort Wayne Mad Ants
- 2008: Pierrel Capo d'Orlando
- 2008–2009: AEL 1964 GS
- 2009–2011: Cholet
- 2011–2012: CSKA Moscow
- 2012–2015: Banvit
- 2015–2020: Tofaş

Coaching
- 2025–present: JL Bourg (assistant)

Career highlights
- As player: All-EuroCup First Team (2015); Russian PBL champion (2012); VTB United League champion (2012); French League Foreign Player's MVP (2011); French League champion (2010); French LNB Pro A All-Star (2010); As assistant coach: EuroCup champion (2026)
- Stats at Basketball Reference

Samuel José Mejía (born February 7, 1983) is a Dominican-American professional basketball coach and former player. He is the current assistant for JL Bourg of the French LNB Élite. retired professional basketball player. He played college basketball at DePaul University. Standing at 6 ft 6 in (1.98 m), he played at the shooting guard and small forward positions.

== Amateur career ==
Mejía attended Theodore Roosevelt High School in the Bronx. He was there from 1997 to 2000 and led the Rough Riders basketball team to the PSAL's "B" division championship in 2000.

Mejía left there to attend the Storm King School, Cornwall-on-Hudson, New York, from which he graduated. He was coached there by Kevin Houston who led the nation in scoring in 1986–87.

== Professional career ==
Mejía was drafted by the Detroit Pistons in the 2007 NBA draft, with the 57th overall pick. The Pistons waived Mejía on October 29, 2007. In 2007–08, he briefly played with the Fort Wayne Mad Ants of the NBA D-League. On January 30, 2008, he signed with the Italian club Pierrel Capo d'Orlando, for the rest of the season.

Mejía signed with the Greek League club AEL 1964 GS for the 2008–09 season, where he averaged 14.3 points and 3.4 rebounds in 20 Greek League games.

On September 29, 2009, Mejía moved to France and signed a one-year deal with Cholet Basket. On July 1, 2010, he re-signed with Cholet for one more season. During the 2010–11 EuroLeague, Meija was named the EuroLeague MVP of the 5th week games. He was named the 2011 French League Foreign MVP, and was selected to play at the 2010 LNB All-Star Game, as a forward in the starting line-up of the "Foreign" team, at Paris-Bercy, representing Cholet Basket.

On June 22, 2011, he signed a two-year contract with the Russian club CSKA Moscow. On June 22, 2012, he parted ways with CSKA. The next day, he signed a contract with the Turkish club Banvit.

On January 7, 2015, in a EuroCup away game against Budućnost Podgorica, he was involved in an incident. With two minutes of game remaining, a hooligan ran onto the court and hit him from the back, after which his teammate Rowland punched the hooligan. Mejía later joined Rowland in the brawl. Referees later ejected both players from the court. He was fined by the Euroleague Basketball organization for taking part in the incident, with three games of suspension, and a 30,000-euro fine. On April 16, 2015, he was named to the All-EuroCup First Team.

On August 13, 2015, Mejia signed with Tofaş.

On July 17, 2020, he announced his retirement from professional basketball.

== Coaching career ==
On July 22, 2025, he began his coaching career and signed with JL Bourg of the French LNB Élite as an assistant coach responsible for player development.

== National team career ==
Mejía has been a member of the senior Dominican Republic national basketball team. He played at the 2007 CBC Championship.
