= Kenan Sipahi =

Turkish basketball player (born 1995)

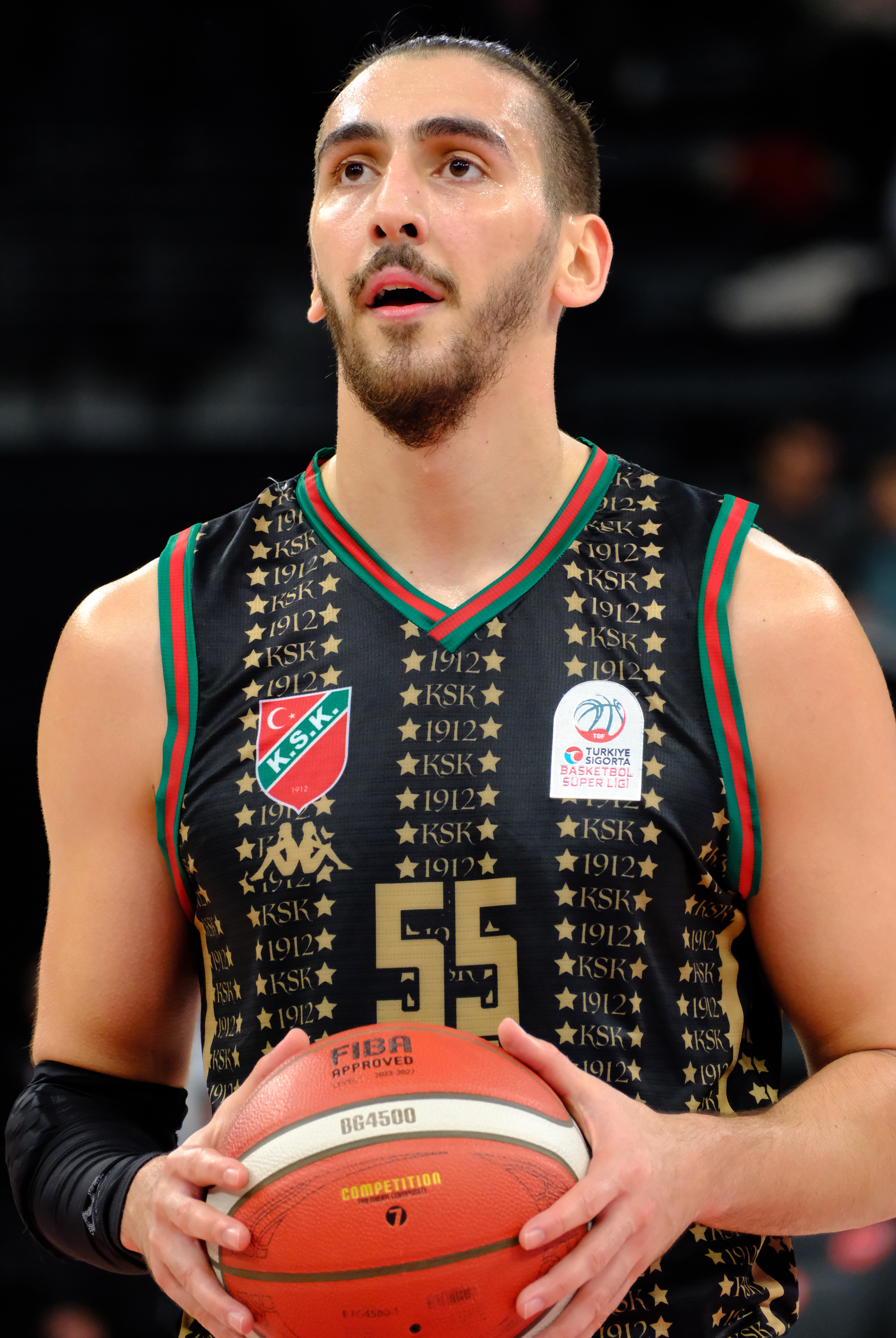
- Sipahi with Karşıyaka in 2024

No. 55 – Bahçeşehir Koleji
- Position: Point guard
- League: Basketbol Süper Ligi

Personal information
- Born: May 26, 1995 (age 31) Pristina, Serbia, FR Yugoslavia (modern Kosovo)
- Listed height: 6 ft 5.75 in (1.97 m)
- Listed weight: 195 lb (88 kg)

Career information
- NBA draft: 2017: undrafted
- Playing career: 2010–present

Career history
- 2010–2013: Tofaş
- 2013–2016: Fenerbahçe
- 2015–2016: →Karşıyaka
- 2016–2019: Beşiktaş
- 2019–2020: Real Betis
- 2020–2021: Fenerbahçe
- 2021: Zaragoza
- 2021–2022: Beşiktaş
- 2022–2025: Karşıyaka
- 2025–present: Bahçeşehir Koleji

Career highlights
- BSL All-Star (2016); FIBA Europe Under-18 Championship MVP (2013)
Medals
Men's basketball
Representing Turkey
EuroBasket
Silver medal – second place	2025 Cyprus–Finland–Poland–Latvia
European U-18 Championship
Gold medal – first place	2013 Latvia	U-18 Team
Bronze medal – third place	2011 Poland	U-18 Team
European U-16 Championship
Bronze medal – third place	2010 Montenegro	U-16 Team

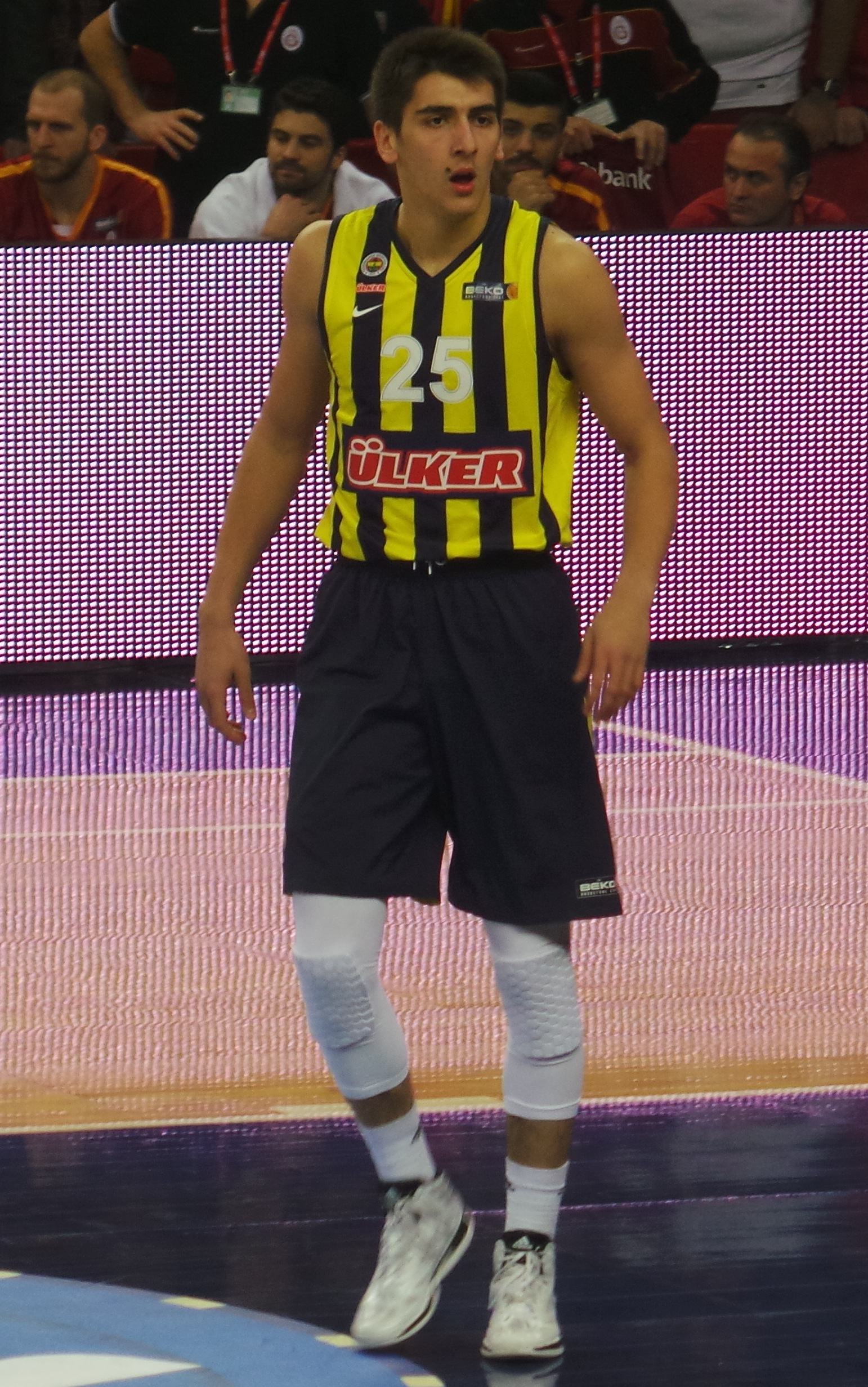
Sipahi with Fenerbahçe in December 2013

Kenan Sipahi (Albanian: Kenan Spahiu; born May 26, 1995) is a Kosovo-born Turkish professional basketball player for Bahçeşehir Koleji of the Turkish Basketbol Süper Ligi (BSL). Standing at 6 ft 5.75 in (1.97 m), he plays at the point guard position.

== Early years ==
Kenan Sipahi was born in 1995 in Pristina, FR Yugoslavia to Xhelal Spahiu or Celal Sipahi, and Bisera Spahiu or Bisera Sipahi. He has been described as having Albanian or Turkish background. Sipahi started playing basketball in Pristina at the age of nine and became a top-level prospect in Turkey at age 15.

== Professional career ==
He made his professional debut in the Turkish League with Tofaş Bursa during the 2010–11 season. He was already playing regularly at the age of 16.

Sipahi made his breakthrough in a 2012–13 season. He played plenty of minutes in the league and EuroChallenge. On January 15, 2013, he scored a game winning three-pointer against Khimik. He averaged 7 points and 2.7 assists in 32 league games.

On September 2, 2013, he signed a three-year contract with option to extend for one season with Fenerbahçe. At the age of 19, he made the roster of Fenerbahçe in the Euroleague. In February 2014, he had season-ending injury, after breaking his arm in Turkish Cup game against Trabzonspor. In his first Euroleague season with the team, he averaged 2.7 points, 1.1 assists and 1 rebound over 15 games.

On September 30, 2015, he was loaned to Karşıyaka for one season. Over the season, he averaged 7.6 points, 4.2 rebounds and 3.5 assists per game in the Turkish League, while also having career-high averages of 5.3 points and 3.7 assists in the Euroleague. On July 1, 2016, he was released from Fenerbahçe.

On July 13, 2016, Sipahi signed a one-year contract with Beşiktaş. On July 18, 2017, he re-signed with Beşiktaş for two more seasons. On August 6, 2019, Sipahi signed a two-year deal with Spanish club Coosur Real Betis.

On July 16, 2020, he signed with Fenerbahçe of the Turkish Basketball Super League. On June 17, 2021, Sipahi parted ways with the Turkish club once more.

On September 15, 2021, he signed with Casademont Zaragoza of the Liga ACB. Sipahi parted ways with the team on December 10.

On December 16, 2021, he signed with Beşiktaş Icrypex of the Basketbol Süper Ligi (BSL).

On June 21, 2022, he signed with Pınar Karşıyaka of the Basketbol Süper Ligi (BSL) for as second stint after six years.

On January 7, 2025, he signed with Bahçeşehir Koleji of the Turkish Basketbol Süper Ligi (BSL).

== Turkish national team ==
Sipahi is a regular Turkish youth national team player. He helped Turkey's U-18 national team win the gold medal at the 2013 FIBA Europe Under-18 Championship, where he was named to the MVP and All-Tournament Team, averaging 10.9 points, 3.8 rebounds, and 5.0 assists. Also he played at the EuroBasket 2017 with Turkey's men's basketball national team

== Personal life ==
Sipahi is fluent in Turkish, Albanian, Bosnian language and English. He married Albanian model Ilda Abazi in July 2021 in a lavish ceremony at the Ciragan Kempinski palace in Istanbul.

== Career statistics ==
Legend
GP	Games played	GS	Games started	MPG	Minutes per game
FG%	Field-goal percentage	3P%	3-point field-goal percentage	FT%	Free-throw percentage
RPG	Rebounds per game	APG	Assists per game	SPG	Steals per game
BPG	Blocks per game	PPG	Points per game	PIR	Performance index rating
**Bold**	Career high

=== Euroleague ===
Year	Team	GP	GS	MPG	FG%	3P%	FT%	RPG	APG	SPG	BPG	PPG	PIR
2013–14	Fenerbahçe	15	8	12.6	**.517**	**.364**	.700	1.0	1.1	.5	**.1**	2.7	2.1
2014–15	Fenerbahçe	**22**	**11**	9.8	.318	.192	**.750**	.8	.7	.4	.0	1.6	.2
2015–16	Karşıyaka	10	5	**18.9**	.358	.200	.688	**1.1**	**3.7**	**.9**	.0	**5.3**	**6.1**
Career		47	24	12.6	.381	.228	.700	.9	1.4	.5	.0	2.8	2.0

== Accomplishments and awards ==
=== Individual ===
- 2013 FIBA Europe Under-18 Championship: MVP
- 2013 FIBA Europe Under-18 Championship: All-Tournament Team
