= Doğuş Balbay =

Turkish basketball player (born 1989)

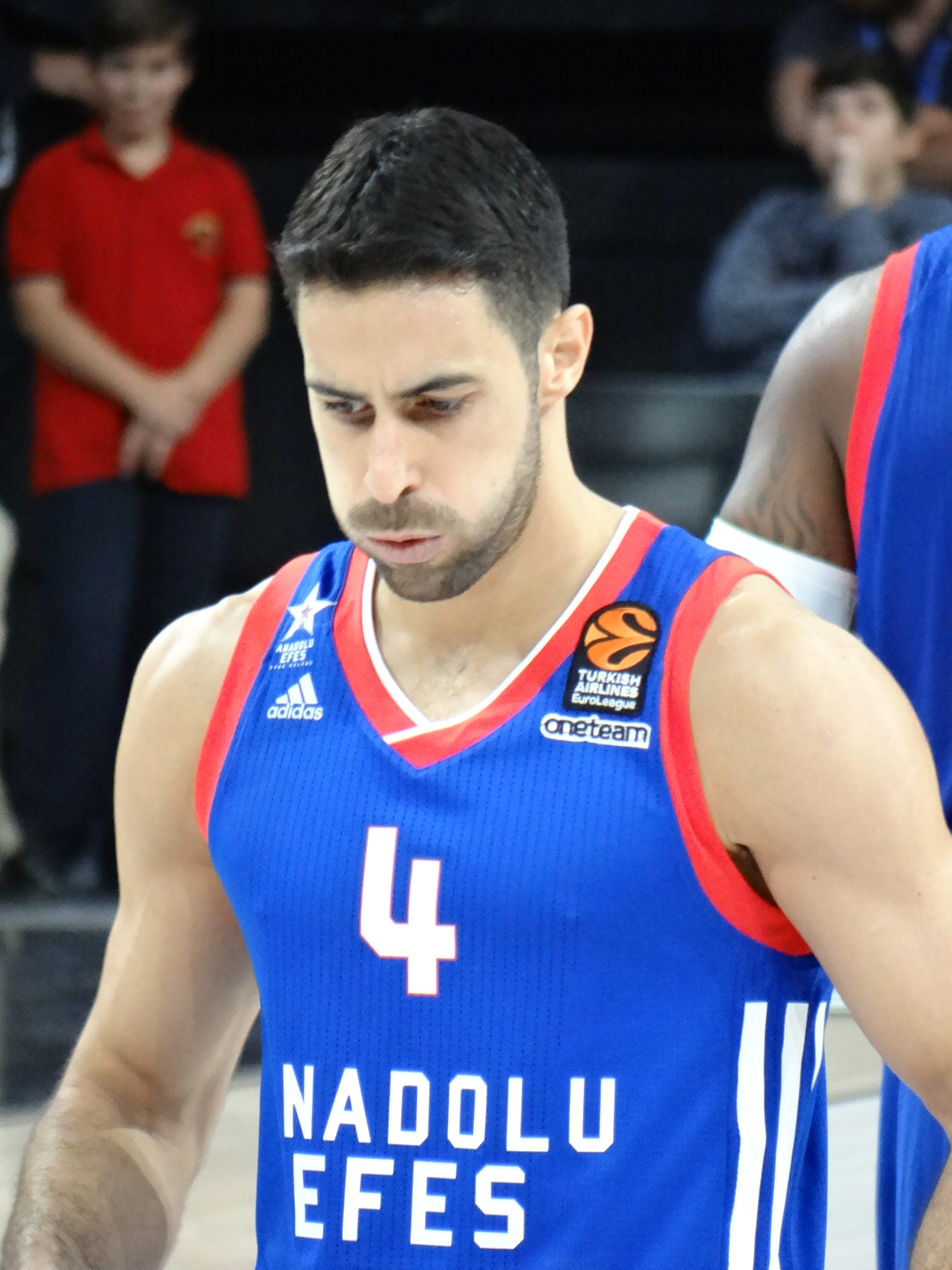
- Doğuş with Anadolu Efes in 2017

Personal information
- Born: 21 January 1989 (age 37) Istanbul, Turkey
- Listed height: 6 ft 1 in (1.85 m)
- Listed weight: 180 lb (82 kg)

Career information
- High school: Brewster Academy (Wolfeboro, New Hampshire)
- College: Texas (2008–2011)
- NBA draft: 2011: undrafted
- Playing career: 2004–2023
- Position: Point guard
- Number: 4

Career history
- 2004–2006: Fenerbahçe
- 2011–2023: Anadolu Efes

Career highlights
- 2× EuroLeague champion (2021, 2022); 3× Turkish League champion (2019, 2021, 2023); 3× Turkish Cup winner (2015, 2018, 2022); 4× Turkish Presidential Cup winner (2015, 2018, 2019, 2022); Turkish Presidential Cup MVP (2018); FIBA U16 European Championship 3rd place (2004); FIBA U16 European Championship champion (2005); Mediterranean Games champion with Turkey (2013); Big 12 Defensive Player of the Year and All-Defensive Team (2009–10)
Medals
Men's basketball
Representing Turkey
Mediterranean Games
Gold medal – first place	2013 Mersin

Doğuş Balbay (Turkish pronunciation: [doˈuʃ balˈbaj]; born 21 January 1989) is a Turkish former professional basketball player. He is 6 ft 1 in (1.85 m) tall and he plays at the point guard position.

== Amateur career ==
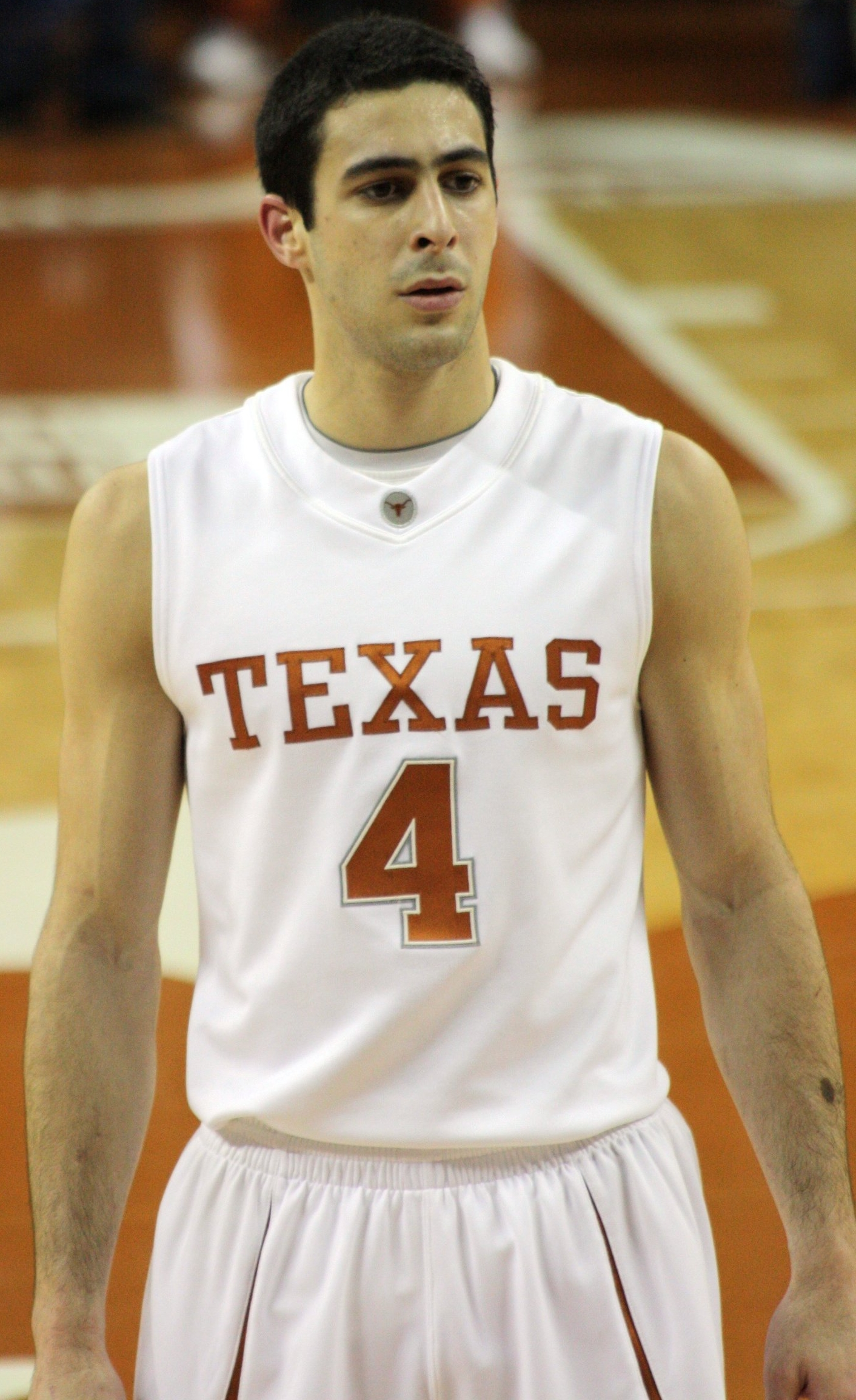
Balbay playing with Texas in February 2009

Doğuş Balbay started playing basketball in the Turkish club Fenerbahçe. After two years in the Turkish Basketball League, he moved to Brewster Academy, Wolfeboro, New Hampshire, U.S. to study.

Balbay spent the last two years playing on the Under-18 Turkish national team, and he helped the squad place fourth at the 2006 European Championships. He also played two years on the Under-16 Turkish national team and led that squad to the 2005 FIBA Europe Under-16 Championship.

He led Brewster to a 29–6 record and a runner-up finish at the NEPSAC Class A Championship while averaging 13.5 points and 7.5 assists per game during his senior season under coach Jason Smith.

After Balbay signed a letter of intent with Texas, Longhorns' head coach Rick Barnes declared that "Dogus is an important pickup for our program, as he will provide us quality depth at the point guard position." Barnes also said that Dogus "has a clever international game and good athleticism. Dogus is a strong perimeter defender and a good play maker who has the ability to score in the lane."

At the midway mark of the 2009–10 season, ESPN analyst Jay Bilas named Balbay one of the two top perimeter defenders in college basketball that season, along with Chris Kramer of Purdue. Bilas said about Balbay,

Balbay puts the best pressure on the ball of anyone I have seen all season long. With his ball pressure, teams have a difficult time running offense against Texas, and Balbay has taken more than one quality point guard out of the game this season.

Doğuş was not drafted in the 2011 NBA draft but was linked with various European teams, including his native Fenerbahçe. His strength, versality, defensive prowess and speed is said to resemble Fenerbahçe and national player Ömer Onan.

ESPN analyst Fran Fraschilla named Doğuş his favourite player in the 2011 Eurocamp.

== Professional career ==
In July 2011, he signed a three-year contract with Anadolu Efes. He won the 2012 BSL All-Star Slam Dunk Contest, securing the win by jumping over Anadolu Efes teammate and 2010 BSL All-Star Slam Dunk Contest champion Sinan Güler on his way to the basket. In May 2014, he re-signed his contract with Anadolu Efes.

On 23 June 2023, Balbay amicably parted ways with the Turkish powerhouse after 12 seasons together.

On 13 December 2023, he announced his retirement from professional basketball.

== Career statistics ==
Legend
GP	Games played	GS	Games started	MPG	Minutes per game
FG%	Field-goal percentage	3P%	3-point field-goal percentage	FT%	Free-throw percentage
RPG	Rebounds per game	APG	Assists per game	SPG	Steals per game
BPG	Blocks per game	PPG	Points per game	PIR	Performance index rating
**Bold**	Career high

=== EuroLeague ===
†	Denotes season in which Balbay won the EuroLeague
*	Led the league

Year	Team	GP	GS	MPG	FG%	3P%	FT%	RPG	APG	SPG	BPG	PPG	PIR
2011–12	Anadolu Efes	8	1	4.6	.250	—	.000	.1	.8	.3	—	0.3	-0.1
2012–13	Anadolu Efes	8	1	8.3	.500	.000	.857	.8	.8	.4	.1	2.3	2.3
2013–14	Anadolu Efes	18	**11**	14.3	.439	.000	.333	1.8	.8	1.2	.1	**2.9**	2.6
2014–15	Anadolu Efes	24	7	8.5	.368	.000	**1.000**	.9	.8	.2	.1	1.3	0.6
2015–16	Anadolu Efes	18	0	4.6	.333	.250	.000	.4	.5	.2	—	0.6	0.2
2016–17	Anadolu Efes	28	8	9.8	.404	.304	.333	1.5	1.0	.6	.1	1.9	2.1
2017–18	Anadolu Efes	16	5	**16.5**	.280	.100	.500	**2.3**	**1.8**	**1.3**	**.3**	2.1	**3.2**
2018–19	Anadolu Efes	**37***	6	10.5	.500	**.609**	**1.000**	1.4	1.3	.4	.2	2.0	2.6
2019–20	Anadolu Efes	25	2	7.9	.481	.385	.000	1.0	.9	.5	.0	1.2	2.1
2020–21†	Anadolu Efes	29	1	6.7	**.571**	.286	.625	.6	.6	.4	.1	1.4	1.6
2021–22†	Anadolu Efes	7	0	3.1	.000	.000	.500	.7	.3	—	—	0.1	0.6
2022–23	Anadolu Efes	4	0	5.8	.500	.500	**1.000**	2.0	.3	.3	**.3**	1.5	2.5
Career		222	42	9.1	.422	.300	.545	1.1	.9	.5	.1	1.6	1.8

== Personal life ==
He is the son of Mithat (father) and Şükran (mother) Balbay, and has one older sister, Derya. He was married 8 July 2017 to Erica Balbay.

== See also ==
- Texas Longhorns men's basketball
