= 2018–19 Fenerbahçe S.K. (basketball) season =

Fenerbahçe
2018–19 season
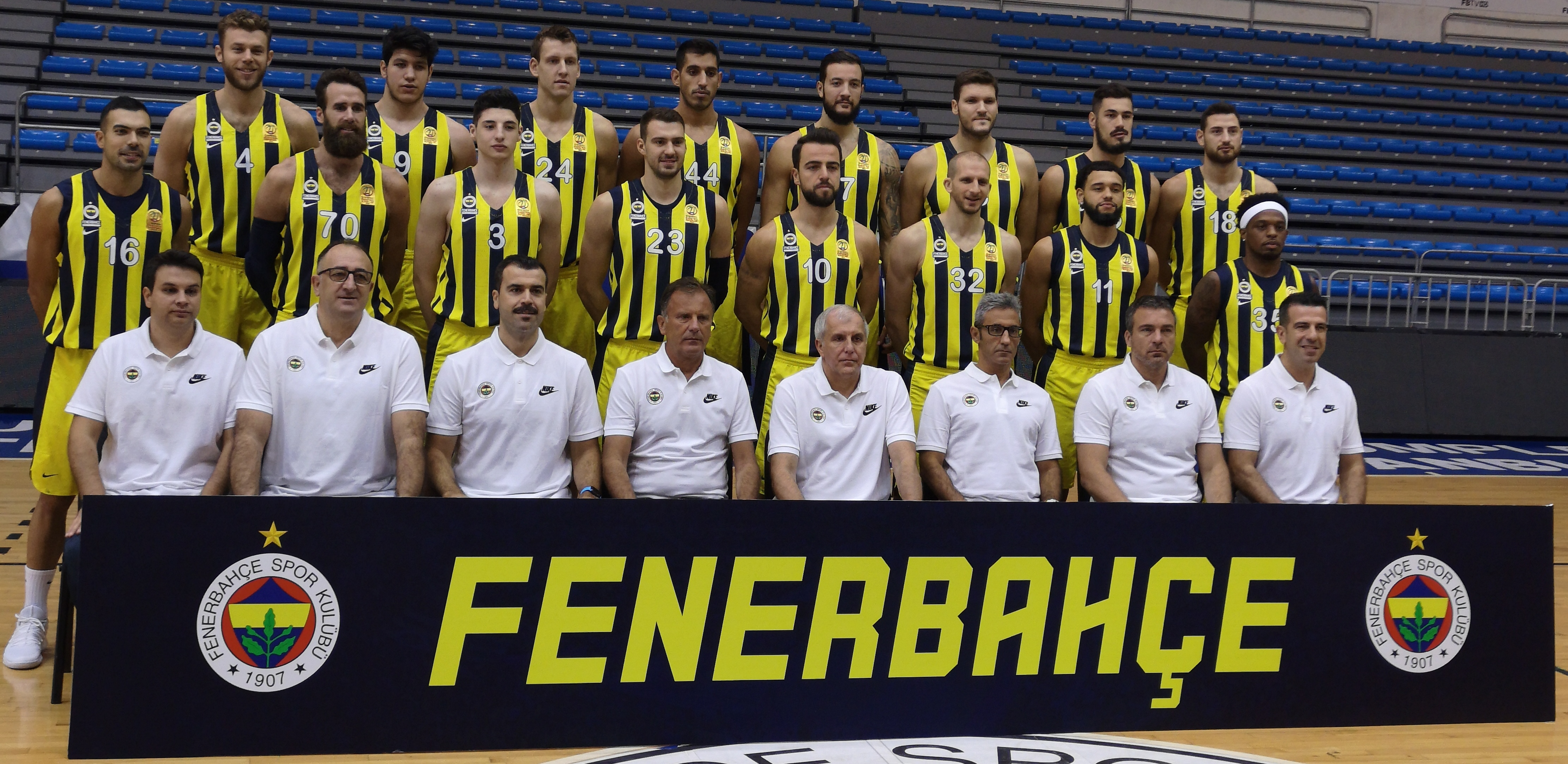
- Owner: Fenerbahçe S.K.
- Chairman: Ali Koç
- Head coach: Željko Obradović
- Arena: Ülker Sports and Event Hall
- Basketball Super League: 1st seed
- Playoffs: Runners-up
- EuroLeague: 1st seed
- Playoffs: 4th
- Turkish Cup: Winners
- Presidential Cup: Runners-up
- PIR leader: (Czech Republic) Veselý 17.9
- Scoring leader: (France) Lauvergne 12.6
- Rebounding leader: (Czech Republic) Veselý 6.3
- Assists leader: (Greece) Sloukas 4.8
| Home | Away |

The 2018–19 Fenerbahçe Basketball season was the 105th season in the existence of the club. The team played in the Basketbol Süper Ligi (BSL) and in the European first tier EuroLeague.

== Players ==
=== Squad information ===
Note: Flags indicate national team eligibility at FIBA-sanctioned events. Players may hold other non-FIBA nationalities not displayed.

Fenerbahçe roster
Players
Coaches

| Pos. | No. | Nat. | Name | Ht. | Wt. | Age |
|---|---|---|---|---|---|---|
| G | 1 | (United States) | Green, Erick | 1.91 m (6 ft 3 in) | 84 kg (185 lb) | 28 – 9 May 1991 |
| G/F | 3 | (Turkey) | Tırpancı, Ergi | 2.01 m (6 ft 7 in) | 93 kg (205 lb) | 19 – 1 January 2000 |
| F/C | 4 | (Italy) | Melli, Nicolò | 2.05 m (6 ft 9 in) | 107 kg (236 lb) | 28 – 26 January 1991 |
| F/C | 5 | (Turkey) | Hersek, Barış | 2.08 m (6 ft 10 in) | 104 kg (229 lb) | 31 – 26 March 1988 |
| F/C | 9 | (Turkey) | Duran, Ahmet Can | 2.07 m (6 ft 9 in) | 118 kg (260 lb) | 20 – 28 January 1999 |
| G | 10 | (Turkey) | Mahmutoğlu, Melih (C) | 1.91 m (6 ft 3 in) | 85 kg (187 lb) | 29 – 12 May 1990 |
| G | 11 | (Canada) | Ennis, Tyler | 1.91 m (6 ft 3 in) | 88 kg (194 lb) | 24 – 24 August 1994 |
| SF | 12 | (Serbia) | Kalinić, Nikola | 2.03 m (6 ft 8 in) | 101 kg (223 lb) | 27 – 8 November 1991 |
| G/F | 13 | (Turkey) | Biberovic, Tarik | 2.01 m (6 ft 7 in) | 100 kg (220 lb) | 18 – 28 January 2001 |
| G | 16 | (Greece) | Sloukas, Kostas | 1.90 m (6 ft 3 in) | 95 kg (209 lb) | 29 – 15 January 1990 |
| SF | 18 | (Turkey) | Arna, Egehan | 2.03 m (6 ft 8 in) | 93 kg (205 lb) | 22 – 5 January 1997 |
| G/F | 23 | (Serbia) | Gudurić, Marko | 1.99 m (6 ft 6 in) | 91 kg (201 lb) | 24 – 8 March 1995 |
| F/C | 24 | (Czech Republic) | Veselý, Jan | 2.13 m (7 ft 0 in) | 110 kg (243 lb) | 29 – 24 April 1990 |
| G | 32 | (Turkey) | Güler, Sinan | 1.92 m (6 ft 4 in) | 95 kg (209 lb) | 35 – 8 November 1983 |
| PG | 35 | (Turkey) | Dixon, Bobby (DC) | 1.78 m (5 ft 10 in) | 73 kg (161 lb) | 36 – 10 April 1983 |
| C | 44 | (Jordan) | Düverioğlu, Ahmet (DC) | 2.13 m (7 ft 0 in) | 121 kg (267 lb) | 26 – 4 March 1993 |
| F | 70 | (Italy) | Datome, Luigi | 2.03 m (6 ft 8 in) | 98 kg (216 lb) | 31 – 27 November 1987 |
| C | 77 | (France) | Lauvergne, Joffrey | 2.13 m (7 ft 0 in) | 118 kg (260 lb) | 27 – 30 September 1991 |

Head coach

- (Serbia) Željko Obradović

Assistant coach(es)

- (Serbia) Vladimir Androić
- (Turkey) Erdem Can
- (Spain) Josep Maria Izquierdo
- (Turkey) Berkay Oğuz

Athletic trainer(s)

- (Turkey) İlker Belgutay
- (Serbia) Predrag Zimonjić

Physiotherapist(s)

- (Turkey) Sefa Öztürk

Team manager

- (Italy) Maurizio Gherardini
- (Turkey) Cenk Renda

Legend

- (C) Team captain
- Injured

- Roster
Updated: October 26, 2018

=== Depth chart ===
| Pos. | Starting 5 | Bench 1 | Bench 2 | Bench 3 |
|---|---|---|---|---|
| C | Jan Veselý | Joffrey Lauvergne | Ahmet Düverioğlu | Ahmet Can Duran |
| PF | Nicolò Melli | Barış Hersek |
| SF | Nikola Kalinić | Luigi Datome | Egehan Arna | Tarik Biberović |
| SG | Kostas Sloukas | Erick Green | Melih Mahmutoğlu | Ergi Tırpancı |
| PG | Bobby Dixon | Marko Gudurić | Tyler Ennis | Sinan Güler |

=== Transactions ===
==== In ====
| No. | Pos. | Nat. | Name | Age | Moving from | | Ends | Date | Source |
|---|---|---|---|---|---|---|---|---|---|
| 77 | C | (France) | Joffrey Lauvergne | 26 | San Antonio Spurs | (United States) | June 2020 | 4 July 2018 | |
| 11 | PG | (Canada) | Tyler Ennis | 23 | Los Angeles Lakers | (United States) | June 2020 | 19 July 2018 | |
| 1 | SG | (United States) | Erick Green | 27 | Valencia | (Spain) | June 2019 | 26 October 2018 | |

==== Out ====
| No. | Pos. | Nat. | Name | Age | Moving to | | Date | Source |
|---|---|---|---|---|---|---|---|---|
| 11 | PG | (United States) | Brad Wanamaker | 28 | Boston Celtics | (United States) | 2 July 2018 | |
| 21 | SF | (United States) | James Nunnally | 28 | Minnesota Timberwolves | (United States) | 8 August 2018 | |
| 1 | C | (United States) | Jason Thompson | 32 | Sichuan Blue Whales | (China) | 11 August 2018 | |

== Pre-season and friendlies ==
=== Friendly match ===
| 15 September 2018 Cagliari Cup | Fenerbahçe (Turkey) | 75–84 | (France) Limoges CSP | Cagliari, Italy |
| 19:00 | Scoring by quarter: 17–16, 17–23, 18–23, 23–22 |
| | | Report |

| 16 September 2018 Cagliari Cup | Fenerbahçe (Turkey) | 74–79 | (Italy) Olimpia Milano | Cagliari, Italy |
| 17:00 | Scoring by quarter: 22–18, 17–26, 15–21, 20–14 |
| | | Report |

| 18 September 2018 Friendly | Fenerbahçe (Turkey) | 86–95 | (Italy) Dinamo Sassari | Carbonia, Italy |
| 21:30 | Scoring by quarter: 24–32, 21–20, 22–21, 19–22 |
| | | Report |

| 27 September 2018 Pavlos Giannakopoulos Cup | Fenerbahçe (Turkey) | 94–92(OT) | (Israel) Maccabi Tel Aviv | Athens, Greece |
| 18:30 | Scoring by quarter: 15–20, 24–15, 18, 18, 21–25, Overtime: 16–14 |
| | | Report |

| 28 September 2018 Pavlos Giannakopoulos Cup | Fenerbahçe (Turkey) | 85–80 | (Greece) Panathinaikos | Athens, Greece |
| 20:30 | Scoring by quarter: 22–15, 20–26, 26–21, 17–18 |
| | | Report |

=== Zadar Doğuş Cup ===
| 21 September 2018 Group A | Fenerbahçe (Turkey) | 65–60 | (Israel) Maccabi Tel Aviv | Zadar |
| 18:30 | Scoring by quarter: 13–14, 18–14, 9–15, 25–17 |
| | | Report |

| 22 September 2018 Group A | Fenerbahçe (Turkey) | 84–79 | (Italy) Olimpia Milano | Zadar |
| 21:30 | Scoring by quarter: 16–24, 25–18, 21–16, 22–21 |
| | | Report |

| 23 September 2018 Final | Fenerbahçe (Turkey) | 86–76 | (Russia) CSKA Moscow | Zadar |
| 21:30 | Scoring by quarter: 16–10, 16–24, 26–24, 28–18 |
| | | Report |

== Competitions ==
=== Overview ===
| Competition | First match | Last match | Starting round | Final position | Record | | | | | | | |
| Competition | First match | Last match | Starting round | Final position | Pld | W | D | L | PF | PA | PD | Win % |
|---|---|---|---|---|---|---|---|---|---|---|---|---|
| Basketball Super League | 6 October 2018 | 21 June 2019 | Round 1 | Runners-up | 41 | 32 | 0 | 9 | 3,482 | 2,939 | +543 | 78.05 |
| EuroLeague | 12 October 2018 | 19 May 2019 | Round 1 | 4th | 36 | 28 | 0 | 8 | 2,973 | 2,687 | +286 | 77.78 |
| Turkish Basketball Cup | 13 February 2019 | 17 February 2019 | Quarterfinals | Winner | 3 | 3 | 0 | 0 | 231 | 205 | +26 | 100.00 |
| Turkish Basketball Presidential Cup | 3 October 2018 | 3 October 2018 | Final | Runners-up | 1 | 0 | 0 | 1 | 62 | 65 | −3 | 0.00 |
| Total | | | | | 81 | 63 | 0 | 18 | 6,748 | 5,896 | +852 | 77.78 |

Source: Competitions

=== Basketball Super League ===
==== League table ====
| Pos | Team | Pld | W | L | PF | PA | PD | Pts | Qualification or relegation |
|---|---|---|---|---|---|---|---|---|---|
| 1 | Anadolu Efes | 28 | 25 | 3 | 2509 | 2119 | +390 | 53 | Advance to playoffs |
| 2 | Fenerbahçe Beko | 28 | 24 | 4 | 2437 | 1969 | +468 | 52 | Advance to playoffs |
| 3 | Tofaş | 28 | 18 | 10 | 2286 | 2211 | +75 | 46 | Advance to playoffs |
| 4 | Galatasaray Doğa Sigorta | 28 | 18 | 10 | 2271 | 2141 | +130 | 46 | Advance to playoffs |
| 5 | Gaziantep Basketbol | 28 | 17 | 11 | 2069 | 1983 | +86 | 45 | Advance to playoffs |

Source: Basketbol Süper Ligi

==== Results summary ====
| Overall | | | | | | Home | | | | | Away | | | | |
| Pld | W | L | PF | PA | PD | W | L | PF | PA | PD | W | L | PF | PA | PD |
|---|---|---|---|---|---|---|---|---|---|---|---|---|---|---|---|
| 28 | 24 | 4 | 2437 | 1969 | +468 | 13 | 1 | 1226 | 962 | +264 | 11 | 3 | 1211 | 1007 | +204 |

Source: bsl.org.tr

==== Matches ====
Win Loss

| 6 October 2018 1 | Fenerbahçe Beko | 78–73 | Beşiktaş Sompo Japan | Istanbul |
| 17:30 | Scoring by quarter: 18–16, 20–19, 23, 23, 17–15 |
| | Pts: Sloukas 16; Rebs: Melli 9 Asts: Gudurić 5 | Report | Pts: Gibson 14; Rebs: Alexander 4 Asts: Sipahi 4 | Arena: Ülker Sports and Event Hall; Referees: Yener Yılmaz, Mehmet Serdar Ünal, Ali Şakacı |

| 14 October 2018 2 | Türk Telekom | 72–80 | Fenerbahçe Beko | Ankara |
| 15:15 | Scoring by quarter: 19–22, 18–9, 18–26, 17–23 |
| | Pts: Landesberg 20; Rebs: Štimac 10; Asts: Campbell 6 | Report | Pts: Veselý 16; Rebs: Gudurić 7 Asts: Kalinić 6 | Arena: Ankara Arena; Referees: Erşan Kartal, Can Mavisu, Sinem Tetik |

| 21 October 2018 3 | Arel Üniversitesi Büyükçekmece | 69–98 | Fenerbahçe Beko | Istanbul |
| 20:00 | Scoring by quarter: 20–21, 14–31, 17–20, 18–26 |
| | Pts: Williams 18; Rebs: Williams 9 Asts: Armstead 4 | Report | Pts: Kalinić 17; Rebs: Veselý 9 Asts: Kalinić, Dixon 5 | Arena: Gazanfer Bilge Spor Salonu; Referees: Osman Sinan İşgüder, Alper Özgök, Duhan Köyiçi |

| 27 October 2018 4 | Gaziantep Basketbol | 55–67 | Fenerbahçe Beko | Gaziantep |
| 15:15 | Scoring by quarter: 8–16, 15–20, 18–12, 14–19 |
| | Pts: Tomas 14; Rebs: Jekiri 8 Asts: Bayram 4 | Report | Pts: Düverioğlu 16; Rebs: Lauvergne 10; Asts: Gudurić, Sloukas 5 | Arena: Karataş Şahinbey Sport Hall; Referees: Aytuğ Ekti -Ali Serkan Emlek, Musa Kazım Çetin |

| 5 November 2018 5 | Fenerbahçe Beko | 86–79(OT) | Anadolu Efes | Istanbul |
| 20:00 | Scoring by quarter: 26–23, 18, 18, 13–12, 15–19, Overtime: 14–7 |
| | Pts: Kalinić 17; Rebs: Veselý 12; Asts: Kalinić, Sloukas 4 | Report | Pts: Moerman 18; Rebs: Moerman 12; Asts: Micić 6 | Arena: Ülker Sports and Event Hall; Referees: Emin Moğulkoç, Ziya Özorhon, Kerem Baki |

| 11 November 2018 6 | Bahçeşehir Koleji | 77–84 | Fenerbahçe Beko | Istanbul |
| 20:00 | Scoring by quarter: 20–13, 23–26, 18–24, 16–21 |
| | Pts: Colom 21; Rebs: Slaughter 7 Asts: Colom 6 | Report | Pts: Veselý 22; Rebs: Datome 6 Asts: Güler 5 | Arena: Ayhan Şahenk Sports Hall; Referees: Zafer Yılmaz, Alper Özgök, Özge Şentürk |

| 7 | vs. |

| 25 November 2018 8 | Tofaş | 69–74 | Fenerbahçe Beko | Bursa |
| 17:30 | Scoring by quarter: 19–26, 14–15, 20–17, 16, 16 |
| | Pts: Mejia 24; Rebs: Durmaz 6 Asts: Weems 5 | Report | Pts: Lauvergne 20; Rebs: Lauvergne 13; Asts: Kalinić, Sloukas 4 | Arena: Tofaş Nilüfer Sports Hall; Referees: Yener Yılmaz, Alper Altuğ Köselerli, Ali Köseoğlu |

| 4 December 2018 9 | Fenerbahçe Beko | 80–72 | Pınar Karşıyaka | Istanbul |
| 20:15 | Scoring by quarter: 18–28, 19–14, 18–13, 25–17 |
| | Pts: Kalinić 21; Rebs: Melli 6 Asts: Melli 4 | Report | Pts: Marei 29; Rebs: Marei 13; Asts: Walker 9 | Arena: Ülker Sports and Event Hall; Referees: Mehmet Keseratar, Semih Vural, Serhat Büker |

| 9 December 2018 10 | İstanbul BB | 86–103 | Fenerbahçe Beko | Istanbul |
| 20:00 | Scoring by quarter: 15–27, 28–24, 11–26, 32–26 |
| | Pts: Kulig 22; Rebs: Babić 7 Asts: Babić 8 | Report | Pts: Lauvergne 20; Rebs: Lauvergne, Melli 7 Asts: Arna 6 | Arena: Cebeci Sport Hall; Referees: Özlem Yalman, Osman Sinan İşgüder, Halit Can Cihan |

| 15 December 2018 11 | Fenerbahçe Beko | 92–68 | Afyon Belediye | Istanbul |
| 13:00 | Scoring by quarter: 28–16, 15, 15, 23–22, 26–15 |
| | Pts: Düverioğlu 16; Rebs: Lauvergne 7 Asts: Kalinić 7 | Report | Pts: Knight 18; Rebs: Želionis 9 Asts: Özer 5 | Arena: Ülker Sports and Event Hall; Referees: Mehmet Şahin, Mehmet Serdar Ünal, Musa Kazım Çetin |

| 23 December 2018 12 | Galatasaray Doğa Sigorta | 84–74 | Fenerbahçe Beko | Istanbul |
| 15:15 | Scoring by quarter: 25–16, 18–22, 16–14, 25–22 |
| | Pts: Harrison 28; Rebs: Auguste 7 Asts: Köksal 5 | Report | Pts: Veselý 23; Rebs: Veselý 9 Asts: Sloukas 6 | Arena: Sinan Erdem Dome; Referees: Erşan Kartal, Mehmet Karabilecen, Ahmet Tatlıcı |

| 30 December 2018 13 | Fenerbahçe Beko | 91–61 | Darüşşafaka Tekfen | Istanbul |
| 15:15 | Scoring by quarter: 22–15, 25–15, 23–15, 21–16 |
| | Pts: Datome 18; Rebs: Kalinić 6 Asts: Veselý 6 | Report | Pts: Douglas 14; Rebs: Douglas, Evans 6 Asts: Evans 3 | Arena: Ülker Sports and Event Hall; Referees: Ali Şakacı, Kaan Büyükçil, Ozan Çakar |

| 6 January 2019 14 | Banvit | 83–78(OT) | Fenerbahçe Beko | Balıkesir |
| 17:30 | Scoring by quarter: 15–11, 12–9, 11–24, 28–22, Overtime: 17–12 |
| | Pts: Morgan 20; Rebs: Morgan 8 Asts: Pérez 6 | Report | Pts: Melli 22; Rebs: Melli, Düverioğlu 6 Asts: Datome, Dixon 5 | Arena: Kara Ali Acar Sport Hall; Referees: Yener Yılmaz, Can Mavisu, Ali Köseoğlu |

| 13 January 2019 15 | Fenerbahçe Beko | 89–64 | Adatıp Sakarya BB | Istanbul |
| 13:00 | Scoring by quarter: 19–15, 25–20, 25–11, 20–18 |
| | Pts: Düverioğlu 19; Rebs: Lauvergne 5 Asts: Sloukas, Melli 5 | Report | Pts: three players 12; Rebs: Paçun, Türkyılmaz 5 Asts: Etou | Arena: Ülker Sports and Event Hall; Attendance: Emin Moğulkoç, Ali Serkan Emlek, Polat Parlak |

| 26 January 2019 16 | Beşiktaş Sompo Japan | 58–79 | Fenerbahçe Beko | Istanbul |
| 20:00 | Scoring by quarter: 17–19, 15–17, 13–24, 13–19 |
| | Pts: Buva 19; Rebs: Sipahi 5 Asts: four players 3 | Report | Pts: Lauvergne 15; Rebs: Gudurić 6 Asts: four players 3 | Arena: BJK Akatlar Arena; Referees: Mehmet Keseratar, Osman Sinan İşgüder, Duhan Köyiçi |

| 3 February 2019 17 | Fenerbahçe Beko | 87–64 | Türk Telekom | Istanbul |
| 13:00 | Scoring by quarter: 24–11, 17–13, 21–26, 25–14 |
| | Pts: Melli 19; Rebs: Melli 9 Asts: Melli, Sloukas 5 | Report | Pts: Štimac, Landesberg 20; Rebs: Štimac 13; Asts: Redding 3 | Arena: Ülker Sports and Event Hall; Referees: Alper Altuğ Köselerli, Halil Baldemir, Halit Can Cihan |

| 10 February 2019 18 | Fenerbahçe Beko | 107–70 | Arel Üniversitesi Büyükçekmece | Istanbul |
| 13:00 | Scoring by quarter: 21–22, 29–14, 31–20, 26–14 |
| | Pts: Dixon 14; Rebs: Düverioğlu 7 Asts: Güler 6 | Report | Pts: Eldridge 13; Rebs: Williams 7 Asts: Gibson 5 | Arena: Ülker Sports and Event Hall; Referees: Mehmet Serdar Ünal, Ziya Özorhon, Özge Şentürk |

| 9 April 2019 19 | Fenerbahçe Beko | 84–67 | Gaziantep Basketbol | Istanbul |
| 19:00 | Scoring by quarter: 21–13, 20–24, 18–15, 25–15 |
| | Pts: Kalinić, Dixon 21; Rebs: Düverioğlu 8 Asts: Sloukas 5 | Report | Pts: Jelovac 16; Rebs: Jekiri 9 Asts: Öğüt 7 | Arena: Ülker Sports and Event Hall; Referees: Mehmet Şahin, Ziya Özorhon, Ahmet Tatlıcı |

| 3 March 2019 20 | Anadolu Efes | 67–65 | Fenerbahçe Beko | Istanbul |
| 15:15 | Scoring by quarter: 20–15, 11–16, 14–17, 22–17 |
| | Pts: Anderson 23; Rebs: Moerman 9 Asts: Micić, Larkin 4 | Report | Pts: Sloukas 14; Rebs: Veselý 9 Asts: Sloukas 5 | Arena: Sinan Erdem Dome; Referees: Aytuğ Ekti, Ali Serkan Emlek, Mehmet Karabilecen |

| 10 March 2019 21 | Fenerbahçe Beko | 90–73 | Bahçeşehir Koleji | Istanbul |
| 13:00 | Scoring by quarter: 17–15, 24–20, 20–26, 29–12 |
| | Pts: Sloukas 27; Rebs: Melli 7 Asts: Sloukas 5 | Report | Pts: Colom 17; Rebs: White 8 Asts: Colom 7 | Arena: Ülker Sports and Event Hall; Referees: Emin Moğulkoç, Özlem Yalman, Sinem Tetik |

| 22 | vs. |

| 2 March 2019 23 | Fenerbahçe Beko | 89–56 | Tofaş | Istanbul |
| 13:00 | Scoring by quarter: 22–17, 17–9, 28–18, 22–12 |
| | Pts: Mahmutoğlu 14; Rebs: Düverioğlu 15; Asts: Gudurić 8 | Report | Pts: Garrett 17; Rebs: Kadji 5 Asts: Ermiş 5 | Arena: Ülker Sports and Event Hall; Referees: Mehmet Keseratar, Kaan Büyükçil, Musa Kazım Çetin |

| 1 April 2019 24 | Pınar Karşıyaka | 81–88 | Fenerbahçe Beko | İzmir |
| 19:00 | Scoring by quarter: 15–17, 24–29, 17, 17, 25, 25 |
| | Pts: Walker 21; Rebs: Marei 8 Asts: Uğurlu 12 | Report | Pts: Gudurić 20; Rebs: Gudurić 6 Asts: three players 5 | Arena: Karşıyaka Arena; Referees: Aytuğ Ekti, Halil Baldemir, Alper Özgök |

| 7 April 2019 25 | Fenerbahçe Beko | 93–70 | İstanbul BB | Istanbul |
| 13:00 | Scoring by quarter: 18–20, 29–9, 22–23, 24–18 |
| | Pts: Green 17; Rebs: Düverioğlu 9 Asts: Güler, Gudurić 4 | Report | Pts: Ellis 18; Rebs: Babić 6 Asts: Yağmur 7 | Arena: Ülker Sports and Event Hall; Referees: Yener Yılmaz, Semih Vural, Seher Ayşe Nur Yazıcıoğlu |

| 12 April 2019 26 | Afyon Belediye | 72–96 | Fenerbahçe Beko | Afyonkarahisar |
| 19:00 | Scoring by quarter: 16–18, 11–28, 23–22, 22–28 |
| | Pts: Carter 16; Rebs: Želionis 7 Asts: Želionis 4 | Report | Pts: Güler 25; Rebs: Arna 7 Asts: Sloukas 8 | Arena: Prof. Dr. Veysel Eroğlu Spor Salonu; Referees: Mehmet Keseratar, Halit Can Cihan, Özge Şentürk |

| 8 May 2019 27 | Fenerbahçe Beko | 90–67 | Galatasaray Doğa Sigorta | Istanbul |
| 21:00 | Scoring by quarter: 21–22, 28–14, 21–15, 20–16 |
| | Pts: Gudurić 23; Rebs: Düverioğlu 11; Asts: Sloukas 4 | Report | Pts: Webster 16; Rebs: Korkmaz 7 Asts: Köksal 5 | Arena: Ülker Sports and Event Hall; Referees: Emin Moğulkoç, Özlem Yalman, Osman Sinan İşgüder |

| 28 April 2019 28 | Darüşşafaka Tekfen | 72–87 | Fenerbahçe Beko | Istanbul |
| 15:15 | Scoring by quarter: 14–25, 20–17, 16–24, 22–21 |
| | Pts: Evans 16; Rebs: three players 7 Asts: three players 3 | Report | Pts: Datome 14; Rebs: Düverioğlu 10; Asts: Sloukas 7 | Arena: Ayhan Şahenk Sports Hall; Referees: Yener Yılmaz, Mehmet Serdar Ünal, Polat Parlak |

| 4 May 2019 29 | Fenerbahçe Beko | 70–78 | Banvit | Istanbul |
| 13:00 | Scoring by quarter: 20–18, 24–19, 9–21, 17–20 |
| | Pts: Melli 18; Rebs: Melli 8 Asts: Sloukas 4 | Report | Pts: Morgan 23; Rebs: Morgan 14; Asts: Perez 5 | Arena: Ülker Sports and Event Hall; Referees: Aytuğ Ekti, Ali Şakacı, Semih Vural |

| 10 May 2019 30 | Adatıp Sakarya BB | 62–138 | Fenerbahçe Beko | Sakarya |
| 18:00 | Scoring by quarter: 6–26, 17–30, 22–39, 17–43 |
| | Pts: Akdamar 22; Rebs: Çevirgen 9 Asts: Tok 5 | Report | Pts: Arna 51; Rebs: Düverioğlu 15; Asts: Güler 10 | Arena: Sakarya Sports Hall; Referees: Kaan Büyükçil, Ozan Çakar, Musa Kazım Çetin |

7th and 22nd rounds were bye due to Trabzonspor's withdrawing.

==== Playoffs ====
===== Quarterfinals =====
| 23 May 2019 1 | Fenerbahçe Beko | 82–72 | Türk Telekom | Istanbul |
| 20:15 | Scoring by quarter: 13–19, 22–23, 21–16, 26–14 |
| | Pts: Sloukas 18; Rebs: Melli 11; Asts: Sloukas 4 | Report | Pts: Štimac 14; Rebs: Štimac 11; Asts: Redding 5 | Arena: Ülker Sports and Event Hall; Referees: Yener Yılmaz, Mehmet Serdar Ünal, Seher Ayşe Nur Yazıcıoğlu |

| 26 May 2019 2 | Türk Telekom | 88–85 | Fenerbahçe Beko | Ankara |
| 17:30 | Scoring by quarter: 21–24, 27–21, 22–23, 18–17 |
| | Pts: Campbell 26; Rebs: Gabriel 9 Asts: Redding 5 | Report | Pts: Mahmutoğlu 19; Rebs: Kalinić 6 Asts: Kalinić 6 | Arena: Ankara Arena; Referees: Erşan Kartal, Kerem Baki, Alper Özgök |

| 29 May 2019 3 | Fenerbahçe Beko | 92–59 | Türk Telekom | Istanbul |
| 20:45 | Scoring by quarter: 22–17, 24–14, 17–13, 29–15 |
| | Pts: Kalinić 22; Rebs: Düzerioğlu 8 Asts: Gudurić 6 | Report | Pts: Štimac 14; Rebs: Štimac 10; Asts: Štimac 3 | Arena: Ülker Sports and Event Hall; Referees: Emin Moğulkoç, Aytuğ Ekti, Osman Sinan İşgüder |

===== Semifinals =====
| 1 June 2019 1 | Fenerbahçe Beko | 102–68 | Tofaş | Istanbul |
| 18:00 | Scoring by quarter: 32–22, 27–17, 24–11, 19–18 |
| | Pts: Melli 27; Rebs: Düverioğlu 5 Asts: Sloukas 6 | Report | Pts: Durmaz 16; Rebs: Durmaz 7 Asts: Trice 5 | Arena: Ülker Sports and Event Hall; Referees: Mehmet Keseratar, Alper Altuğ Köselerli, Mehmet Şahin |

| 3 June 2019 2 | Fenerbahçe Beko | 68–64 | Tofaş | Istanbul |
| 21:00 | Scoring by quarter: 17–13, 17–10, 22–21, 12–20 |
| | Pts: Gudurić 12; Rebs: Kalinić 7 Asts: beş oyuncu | Report | Pts: Mejia 16; Rebs: Arslan 6 Asts: Trice 7 | Arena: Ülker Sports and Event Hall; Referees: Yener Yılmaz, Kaan Büyükçil, Can Mavisu |

| 6 June 2019 3 | Tofaş | 71–76 | Fenerbahçe Beko | Bursa |
| 19:00 | Scoring by quarter: 14–25, 14–17, 15–19, 28–15 |
| | Pts: three players 14; Rebs: Mejia 6 Asts: Trice 7 | Report | Pts: Dixon 12; Rebs: Kalinić 13; Asts: Kalinić 5 | Arena: Tofaş Nilüfer Sports Hall; Referees: Özlem Yalman, Ali Serkan Emlek, Mehmet Karabilecen |

===== Finals =====
| 9 June 2019 1 | Anadolu Efes | 56–73 | Fenerbahçe Beko | Istanbul |
| 17:00 | Scoring by quarter: 10–18, 22–24, 4–20, 20–11 |
| | Pts: Micić 16; Rebs: Moerman 7 Asts: Larkin 4 | Report | Pts: Dixon 22; Rebs: Melli 7 Asts: Dixon 4 | Arena: Sinan Erdem Dome; Referees: Aytuğ Ekti, Zafer Yılmaz, Alper Altuğ Köselerli |

| 11 June 2019 2 | Anadolu Efes | 101–93(OT) | Fenerbahçe Beko | Istanbul |
| 18:45 | Scoring by quarter: 14–20, 26–32, 25–17, 21–17, Overtime: 15–7 |
| | Pts: Micić 30; Rebs: Dunston 7 Asts: Micić, Larkin 6 | Report | Pts: Melli 22; Rebs: Melli, Güler 5 Asts: Sloukas 11 | Arena: Sinan Erdem Dome; Referees: Yener Yılmaz, Özlem Yalman, Osman Sinan İşgüder |

| 13 June 2019 3 | Fenerbahçe Beko | 57–74 | Anadolu Efes | Istanbul |
| 21:00 | Scoring by quarter: 17–22, 9–14, 19–20, 12–18 |
| | Pts: Kalinić 17; Rebs: Melli 11; Asts: Melli, Gudurić 2 | Report | Pts: Larkin, Beaubois 19; Rebs: Moerman 13; Asts: Larkin, Dunston 4 | Arena: Ülker Sports and Event Hall; Referees: Mehmet Keseratar, Emin Moğulkoç, Kaan Büyükçil |

| 15 June 2019 4 | Fenerbahçe Beko | 82–73 | Anadolu Efes | Istanbul |
| 17:00 | Scoring by quarter: 25–15, 17–22, 20-20, 20–16 |
| | Pts: Melli 19; Rebs: Düverioğlu 11; Asts: Sloukas 6 | Report | Pts: Micić 16; Rebs: Moerman, Beaubois 6 Asts: Micić 9 | Arena: Ülker Sports and Event Hall; Referees: Ali Serkan Emlek, Mehmet Şahin, Can Mavisu |

| 17 June 2019 5 | Anadolu Efes | 86–76 | Fenerbahçe Beko | Istanbul |
| 20:00 | Scoring by quarter: 27–20, 12–17, 27–10, 20–29 |
| | Pts: Moerman 26; Rebs: Moerman 8 Asts: Micić 9 | Report | Pts: Sloukas 22; Rebs: Melli 7 Asts: Melli 5 | Arena: Sinan Erdem Dome; Referees: Mehmet Keseratar, Emin Moğulkoç, Mehmet Serdar Ünal |

| 19 June 2019 6 | Fenerbahçe Beko | 85–69 | Anadolu Efes | Istanbul |
| 20:00 | Scoring by quarter: 17–14, 21–22, 15–16, 32–17 |
| | Pts: Gudurić 21; Rebs: Düverioğlu 8 Asts: Sloukas 8 | Report | Pts: Larkin 16; Rebs: Moerman 7 Asts: Micić, Tuncer 4 | Arena: Ülker Sports and Event Hall; Referees: Aytuğ Ekti, Ziya Özorhon, Osman Sinan İşgüder |

| 21 June 2019 7 | Anadolu Efes | 89–74 | Fenerbahçe Beko | Istanbul |
| 20:00 | Scoring by quarter: 21–23, 23–14, 25–21, 20–16 |
| | Pts: Larkin 38; Rebs: Simon 7 Asts: Larkin, Micić 4 | Report | Pts: Sloukas 21; Rebs: Melli 6 Asts: Sloukas 6 | Arena: Sinan Erdem Dome; Referees: Emin Moğulkoç, Zafer Yılmaz, Kaan Büyükçil |

=== EuroLeague ===
==== League table ====
| Pos | Team | Pld | W | L | PF | PA | PD | Qualification |
|---|---|---|---|---|---|---|---|---|
| 1 | (Turkey) Fenerbahçe Beko | 30 | 25 | 5 | 2504 | 2237 | +267 | Advance to playoffs |
| 2 | (Russia) CSKA Moscow | 30 | 24 | 6 | 2590 | 2397 | +193 | Advance to playoffs |
| 3 | (Spain) Real Madrid | 30 | 22 | 8 | 2578 | 2342 | +236 | Advance to playoffs |
| 4 | (Turkey) Anadolu Efes | 30 | 20 | 10 | 2562 | 2406 | +156 | Advance to playoffs |
| 5 | (Spain) Barcelona Lassa | 30 | 18 | 12 | 2358 | 2282 | +76 | Advance to playoffs |

Source: EuroLeague
Rules for classification: All points scored in extra period(s) will not be counted in the standings, nor for any tie-break situation.

==== Results summary ====
| Overall | | | | | | Home | | | | | Away | | | | |
| Pld | W | L | PF | PA | PD | W | L | PF | PA | PD | W | L | PF | PA | PD |
|---|---|---|---|---|---|---|---|---|---|---|---|---|---|---|---|
| 30 | 25 | 5 | 2504 | 2237 | +267 | 15 | 0 | 1289 | 1122 | +167 | 10 | 5 | 1215 | 1115 | +100 |

Source: EuroLeague

==== Matches ====
| 12 October 2018 1 | Fenerbahçe Beko (Turkey) | 97–72 | (Spain) Herbalife Gran Canaria | Istanbul |
| 19:45 | Scoring by quarter: 22–10, 27–25, 26–23, 22–14 |
| | Pts: Veselý 19; Rebs: Veselý 11; Asts: Sloukas 7 PIR: Veselý 34 | Boxscore | Pts: Evans 13; Rebs: Balvín 6 Asts: Hannah 6 PIR: Hannah 13 | Arena: Ülker Sports and Event Hall; Attendance: 8,081; Referees: Christos Christodoulou, Carmelo Paternicò, Fernando Rocha |

| 17 October 2018 2 | Fenerbahçe Beko (Turkey) | 93–85 | (Russia) Khimki | Istanbul |
| 19:45 | Scoring by quarter: 28–21, 26–22, 12–20, 27–22 |
| | Pts: Melli 16; Rebs: Datome 8 Asts: Mahmutoğlu 4 PIR: Datome, Veselý 18 | Boxscore | Pts: Shved 26; Rebs: Gill 5 Asts: Shved 8 PIR: Shved 25 | Arena: Ülker Sports and Event Hall; Attendance: 8,132; Referees: Juan Carlos García González, Piotr Pastusiak, Artūras Šukys |

| 19 October 2018 3 | Žalgiris (Lithuania) | 75–82 | (Turkey) Fenerbahçe Beko | Kaunas |
| 19:45 | Scoring by quarter: 25–18, 17–16, 15–19, 18–29 |
| | Pts: Wolters 23; Rebs: Davies 6 Asts: Wolters 6 PIR: Davies, Wolters 22 | Boxscore | Pts: Sloukas 20; Rebs: Veselý 4 Asts: Sloukas 5 PIR: Sloukas 25 | Arena: Žalgirio Arena; Attendance: 14,781; Referees: Daniel Hierrezuelo, Mehdi Difallah, Miloš Koljenšić |

| 25 October 2018 4 | Anadolu Efes (Turkey) | 89–83 | (Turkey) Fenerbahçe Beko | Istanbul |
| 19:30 | Scoring by quarter: 12–26, 26–26, 28–13, 23–18 |
| | Pts: Beaubois 17; Rebs: Moerman 10; Asts: Micić 6 PIR: Moerman 21 | Boxscore | Pts: Veselý 24; Rebs: Veselý 8 Asts: Sloukas 8 PIR: Veselý 36 | Arena: Sinan Erdem Dome; Attendance: 5,348; Referees: Luigi Lamonica, Robert Lottermoser, Sérgio Silva |

| 1 November 2018 5 | Fenerbahçe Beko (Turkey) | 88–84 | (Germany) Bayern Munich | Istanbul |
| 18:45 | Scoring by quarter: 28–26, 23–22, 14–17, 23–19 |
| | Pts: Datome 19; Rebs: Melli, Veselý 5 Asts: Sloukas 10; PIR: Datome 24 | Boxscore | Pts: Booker 15; Rebs: Booker, Williams 7 Asts: Jović 6 PIR: Booker 19 | Arena: Ülker Sports and Event Hall; Attendance: 8,868; Referees: Miguel Ángel Pérez Niz, Oļegs Latiševs, Rain Peerandi |

| 9 November 2018 6 | Kirolbet Baskonia (Spain) | 72–74 | (Turkey) Fenerbahçe Beko | Vitoria-Gasteiz |
| 20:30 | Scoring by quarter: 20–18, 13–15, 22–15, 17–26 |
| | Pts: Diop 17; Rebs: Diop 6 Asts: Vildoza 5 PIR: Diop 25 | Boxscore | Pts: Datome 16; Rebs: Datome 5 Asts: Sloukas 4 PIR: Lauvergne 20 | Arena: Fernando Buesa Arena; Attendance: 10,929; Referees: Sreten Radović, Matej Boltauzer, Uroš Obrknežević |

| 15 November 2018 7 | Olympiacos (Greece) | 72–73 | (Turkey) Fenerbahçe Beko | Piraeus |
| 20:00 | Scoring by quarter: 18–21, 21–18, 14–11, 19–23 |
| | Pts: Papanikolaou 18; Rebs: Printezis 10; Asts: Spanoulis, Williams-Goss 5 PIR: Papanikolaou 25 | Boxscore | Pts: Sloukas 20; Rebs: Melli 9 Asts: Sloukas 4 PIR: Sloukas 22 | Arena: Peace and Friendship Stadium; Attendance: 9,379; Referees: Borys Ryzhyk, Fernando Rocha, Carlos Peruga |

| 20 November 2018 8 | Fenerbahçe Beko (Turkey) | 100–79 | (Turkey) Darüşşafaka Tekfen | Istanbul |
| 19:00 | Scoring by quarter: 25–10, 21–27, 22–19, 32–23 |
| | Pts: Mahmutoğlu 16; Rebs: Datome 8 Asts: Gudurić, Sloukas 4 PIR: Lauvergne, Mahmutoğlu 19 | Boxscore | Pts: Eric 17; Rebs: three players 5 Asts: McCallum 7 PIR: McCallum 22 | Arena: Ülker Sports and Event Hall; Attendance: 7,380; Referees: Damir Javor, Ilija Belošević, Artūras Šukys |

| 22 November 2018 9 | Maccabi Tel Aviv (Israel) | 70–74 | (Turkey) Fenerbahçe Beko | Tel Aviv |
| 20:05 | Scoring by quarter: 16–13, 25–23, 12–19, 17–19 |
| | Pts: Caloiaro 17; Rebs: Caloiaro 8 Asts: three players 3 PIR: Caloiaro 24 | Boxscore | Pts: Sloukas 18; Rebs: Lauvergne 8 Asts: Dixon 3 PIR: Sloukas 15 | Arena: Menora Mivtachim Arena; Attendance: 9,817; Referees: Juan Carlos García González, Ioannis Foufis, Anne Panther |

| 30 November 2018 10 | Barcelona Lassa (Spain) | 65–84 | (Turkey) Fenerbahçe Beko | Barcelona |
| 21:00 | Scoring by quarter: 17–23, 19–22, 11–19, 18–20 |
| | Pts: Hanga 16; Rebs: Hanga 6 Asts: Heurtel 4 PIR: Hanga 25 | Boxscore | Pts: Dixon 16; Rebs: Veselý 8 Asts: Gudurić, Veselý 4 PIR: Gudurić 24 | Arena: Palau Blaugrana; Attendance: 6,013; Referees: Luigi Lamonica, Elias Koromilas, Milan Nedović |

| 7 December 2018 11 | Panathinaikos OPAP (Greece) | 69–81 | (Turkey) Fenerbahçe Beko | Athens |
| 20:30 | Scoring by quarter: 12–18, 21–17, 19–21, 17–25 |
| | Pts: Calathes 14; Rebs: Lojeski 7 Asts: Calathes 7 PIR: Lojeski 20 | Boxscore | Pts: Kalinić 18; Rebs: Veselý 7 Asts: Veselý 7 PIR: Veselý 23 | Arena: Olympic Sports Center; Attendance: 13,012; Referees: Matej Boltauzer, Benjamín Jiménez, Fernando Rocha |

| 13 December 2018 12 | Fenerbahçe Beko (Turkey) | 92–85 | (Italy) AX Armani Exchange Olimpia | Istanbul |
| 19:30 | Scoring by quarter: 15–21, 25–19, 27–18, 25–27 |
| | Pts: Gudurić 20; Rebs: Kalinić, Veselý 5 Asts: Sloukas 7 PIR: Gudurić 25 | Boxscore | Pts: James 31; Rebs: Tarczewski 10; Asts: James 6 PIR: James 30 | Arena: Ülker Sports and Event Hall; Attendance: 11,463; Referees: Miguel Ángel Pérez Niz, Sreten Radović, Oļegs Latiševs |

| 18 December 2018 13 | Fenerbahçe Beko (Turkey) | 79–75 | (Russia) CSKA Moscow | Istanbul |
| 18:45 | Scoring by quarter: 18–26, 18–22, 24–14, 19–13 |
| | Pts: Veselý 19; Rebs: Veselý 10; Asts: Sloukas 5 PIR: Veselý 33 | Boxscore | Pts: Clyburn 17; Rebs: Clyburn 5 Asts: Rodríguez 4 PIR: Clyburn 26 | Arena: Ülker Sports and Event Hall; Attendance: 12,119; Referees: Daniel Hierrezuelo, Robert Lottermoser, Mehdi Difallah |

| 20 December 2018 14 | Budućnost VOLI (Montenegro) | 65–89 | (Turkey) Fenerbahçe Beko | Podgorica |
| 20:00 | Scoring by quarter: 20–26, 20–14, 15–27, 10–22 |
| | Pts: Clark 15; Rebs: Omić 6 Asts: three players 4 PIR: Clarke 14 | Boxscore | Pts: Veselý 19; Rebs: Veselý 9 Asts: Dixon, Lauvergne 3 PIR: Veselý 29 | Arena: Morača; Attendance: 5,255; Referees: Elias Koromilas, Seffi Shemmesh, Jordi Aliaga |

| 28 December 2018 15 | Fenerbahçe Beko (Turkey) | 65–63 | (Spain) Real Madrid | Istanbul |
| 18:30 | Scoring by quarter: 22–12, 10–20, 16–12, 17–19 |
| | Pts: Datome 17; Rebs: Melli 8 Asts: Gudurić 4 PIR: Datome 20 | Boxscore | Pts: Fernández 12; Rebs: Ayón 6 Asts: Campazzo 6 PIR: Randolph 12 | Arena: Ülker Sports and Event Hall; Attendance: 12,722; Referees: Christos Christodoulou, Carmelo Paternicò, Milan Nedović |

| 4 January 2019 16 | Fenerbahçe Beko (Turkey) | 96–87 | (Spain) Kirolbet Baskonia | Istanbul |
| 18:45 | Scoring by quarter: 27–25, 21–16, 27–24, 21–22 |
| | Pts: Melli 19; Rebs: Gudurić, Melli 4 Asts: Sloukas 6 PIR: Sloukas, Veselý 22 | Boxscore | Pts: Shields 22; Rebs: Voigtmann 13; Asts: Huertas 6 PIR: Shields, Voigtmann 22 | Arena: Ülker Sports and Event Hall; Attendance: 11,030; Referees: Luigi Lamonica, Borys Ryzhyk, Gytis Vilius |

| 8 January 2019 17 | Khimki (Russia) | 84–78(OT) | (Turkey) Fenerbahçe Beko | Mytishchi |
| 18:00 | Scoring by quarter: 13–23, 25–18, 19–13, 15–18, Overtime: 12–6 |
| | Pts: Marković 13; Rebs: Gill, Marković 7 Asts: Bost 5 PIR: Gill 19 | Boxscore | Pts: Mahmutoğlu 18; Rebs: Melli 8 Asts: Gudurić, Melli 5 PIR: Melli 25 | Arena: Mytishchi Arena; Attendance: 6,759; Referees: Juan Carlos García González, Sreten Radović, Piotr Pastusiak |

| 10 January 2019 18 | Fenerbahçe Beko (Turkey) | 78–61 | (Lithuania) Žalgiris | Istanbul |
| 18:45 | Scoring by quarter: 19–11, 24–18, 14–15, 21–17 |
| | Pts: Mahmutoğlu, Sloukas 14; Rebs: Veselý 12; Asts: Sloukas 6 PIR: Veselý 26 | Boxscore | Pts: Davies 12; Rebs: Jankūnas 5 Asts: Ulanovas 3 PIR: Jankūnas 13 | Arena: Ülker Sports and Event Hall; Attendance: 10,462; Referees: Robert Lottermoser, Benjamín Jiménez, Mario Majkić |

| 17 January 2019 19 | Herbalife Gran Canaria (Spain) | 64–82 | (Turkey) Fenerbahçe Beko | Las Palmas |
| 21:00 | Scoring by quarter: 19–24, 13–20, 19–12, 13–26 |
| | Pts: Tillie 21; Rebs: Pasečņiks 6 Asts: Oliver 5 PIR: Tillie 24 | Boxscore | Pts: Kalinić 16; Rebs: Veselý 7 Asts: Sloukas 6 PIR: Veselý 24 | Arena: Gran Canaria Arena; Attendance: 4,669; Referees: Milivoje Jovčić, Oļegs Latiševs, Mario Majkić |

| 24 January 2019 20 | Fenerbahçe Beko (Turkey) | 90–75 | (Greece) Olympiacos | Istanbul |
| 18:30 | Scoring by quarter: 21–15, 19–13, 28–26, 22–21 |
| | Pts: Green 17; Rebs: four players 3 Asts: Dixon 10; PIR: Dixon 21 | Boxscore | Pts: Timma 14; Rebs: Milutinov, Strēlnieks 4 Asts: three players 4 PIR: Strēlnieks 18 | Arena: Ülker Sports and Event Hall; Attendance: 12,821; Referees: Luigi Lamonica, Matej Boltauzer, Carlos Peruga |

| 31 January 2019 21 | Bayern Munich (Germany) | 90–86(OT) | (Turkey) Fenerbahçe Beko | Munich |
| 20:30 | Scoring by quarter: 20–21, 9–13, 23–18, 14–14, Overtime: 14-14, 10–6 |
| | Pts: Jović, Williams 19; Rebs: Barthel 7 Asts: Đedović, Hobbs 5 PIR: Williams 26 | Boxscore | Pts: Dixon 23; Rebs: Datome 8 Asts: Sloukas 7 PIR: Dixon 23 | Arena: Audi Dome; Attendance: 5,346; Referees: Saša Pukl, Emilio Pérez Pizarro, Rain Peerandi |

| 8 February 2019 22 | Fenerbahçe Beko (Turkey) | 85–66 | (Greece) Panathinaikos OPAP | Istanbul |
| 18:45 | Scoring by quarter: 24–18, 24–11, 15–17, 22–20 |
| | Pts: Melli 14; Rebs: Melli 7 Asts: Dixon, Melli 4 PIR: Melli 27 | Boxscore | Pts: Kilpatrick 19; Rebs: Thomas 6 Asts: Calathes 5 PIR: Kilpatrick 18 | Arena: Ülker Sports and Event Hall; Attendance: 11.825 (tentative); Referees: Miguel Ángel Pérez Niz, Sreten Radović, Mehdi Difallah |

| 22 February 2019 23 | Darüşşafaka Tekfen (Turkey) | 75–97 | (Turkey) Fenerbahçe Beko | Istanbul |
| 18:15 | Scoring by quarter: 12–26, 23–20, 13–27, 27–24 |
| | Pts: Eric 14; Rebs: Eric, Demir 6 Asts: Douglas, Peiners 4 PIR: Peiners 15 | Boxscore | Pts: Dixon, Gudurić 16; Rebs: Veselý 6 Asts: Dixon, Sloukas 4 PIR: Gudurić 21 | Arena: Volkswagen Arena; Attendance: 4,204; Referees: Oļegs Latiševs, Benjamín Jiménez, Ioannis Foufis |

| 28 February 2019 24 | Fenerbahçe Beko (Turkey) | 84–66 | (Turkey) Anadolu Efes | Istanbul |
| 18:45 | Scoring by quarter: 20–17, 23–12, 14–18 |
| | Pts: Sloukas 17; Rebs: Veselý 8 Asts: Gudurić, Sloukas 4 PIR: Sloukas 20 | Boxscore | Pts: Moerman 18; Rebs: Moerman 5 Asts: Micić 5 PIR: Larkin 17 | Arena: Ülker Sports and Event Hall; Attendance: 11,690; Referees: Robert Lottermoser, Carlos Peruga, Piotr Pastusiak |

| 7 March 2019 25 | Real Madrid (Spain) | 101–86 | (Turkey) Fenerbahçe Beko | Madrid |
| 21:00 | Scoring by quarter: 27–25, 25–20, 25–16, 24–25 |
| | Pts: Randolph 21; Rebs: Tavares 5 Asts: Llull 10; PIR: Llull, Randolph 25 | Boxscore | Pts: Sloukas 15; Rebs: Melli 6 Asts: Sloukas 7 PIR: Sloukas 18 | Arena: WiZink Center; Attendance: 11,471; Referees: Christos Christodoulou, Carmelo Paternicò, Tomislav Hordov |

| 15 March 2019 26 | Fenerbahçe Beko (Turkey) | 88–82 | (Spain) Barcelona Lassa | Istanbul |
| 18:45 | Scoring by quarter: 16–23, 21–15, 15–23, 36–21 |
| | Pts: Sloukas 22; Rebs: Melli 5 Asts: Sloukas 11; PIR: Sloukas 30 | Boxscore | Pts: Blažič 15; Rebs: Tomić 5 Asts: Heurtel 6 PIR: Tomić 21 | Arena: Ülker Sports and Event Hall; Attendance: 12,628; Referees: Luigi Lamonica, Sreten Radović, Gytis Vilius |

| 19 March 2019 27 | Fenerbahçe Beko (Turkey) | 76–67 | (Montenegro) Budućnost VOLI | Istanbul |
| 18:45 | Scoring by quarter: 19–16, 17–23, 22–19, 18–9 |
| | Pts: Kalinić 14; Rebs: Veselý 9 Asts: Dixon, Veselý 4 PIR: Veselý 26 | Boxscore | Pts: Clark 20; Rebs: Bitadze 7 Asts: Gordić 10; PIR: Clark 19 | Arena: Ülker Sports and Event Hall; Attendance: 7,738; Referees: Miguel Ángel Pérez Niz, Fernando Rocha, Eduard Udyanskyy |

| 21 March 2019 28 | CSKA Moscow (Russia) | 70–68 | (Turkey) Fenerbahçe Beko | Moscow |
| 18:00 | Scoring by quarter: 14–18, 22–17, 16–13, 18–20 |
| | Pts: Clyburn 16; Rebs: Clyburn, Kurbanov 8 Asts: Rodríguez 4 PIR: Clyburn 21 | Boxscore | Pts: Kalinić 17; Rebs: Kalinić 7 Asts: Kalinić 4 PIR: Kalinić 23 | Arena: Megasport Arena; Attendance: 10,762; Referees: Robert Lottermoser, Oļegs Latiševs, Benjamín Jiménez |

| 28 March 2019 29 | AX Armani Exchange Olimpia (Italy) | 90–104 | (Turkey) Fenerbahçe Beko | Assago |
| 20:45 | Scoring by quarter: 17–22, 25–30, 26–21, 22–31 |
| | Pts: Nunnally 26; Rebs: Brooks, Nunnally 5 Asts: James 4 PIR: Nunnally 33 | Boxscore | Pts: Dixon 23; Rebs: Datome 6 Asts: Dixon 5 PIR: Kalinić 26 | Arena: Mediolanum Forum; Attendance: 11,851; Referees: Boris Ryzhyk, Matej Boltauzer, Carlos Cortés |

| 5 April 2019 30 | Fenerbahçe Beko (Turkey) | 78–75 | (Israel) Maccabi Tel Aviv | Istanbul |
| 19:45 | Scoring by quarter: 20–20, 21–21, 10–18, 27–16 |
| | Pts: Sloukas 22; Rebs: Kalinić 11; Asts: Sloukas 5 PIR: Sloukas 24 | Boxscore | Pts: Black 23; Rebs: Black, Caloiaro 7 Asts: Pargo 4 PIR: Black 28 | Arena: Ülker Sports and Event Hall; Attendance: 10,432; Referees: Saša Pukl, Juan Carlos García González, Mehdi Difallah |

==== Playoffs ====
===== Quarterfinals =====
| 16 April 2019 1 | Fenerbahçe Beko (Turkey) | 76–43 | (Lithuania) Žalgiris | Istanbul |
| 19:45 | Scoring by quarter: 15–13, 23–8, 21–14, 17–8 |
| | Pts: Kalinić 16; Rebs: Düverioğlu 7 Asts: Gudurić 4 PIR: Gudurić, Kalinić 14 | Boxscore | Pts: Grigonis 10; Rebs: Thompson 6 Asts: Westermann 3 PIR: Grigonis 10 | Arena: Ülker Sports and Event Hall; Attendance: 12,503; Referees: Christos Christodoulou, Ilija Belošević, Matej Boltauzer |

| 18 April 2019 2 | Fenerbahçe Beko (Turkey) | 80–82 | (Lithuania) Žalgiris | Istanbul |
| 19:45 | Scoring by quarter: 21–20, 18–26, 19–27, 22–9 |
| | Pts: Datome 17; Rebs: Datome 9 Asts: Sloukas 6 PIR: Datome 22 | Boxscore | Pts: Ulanovas 20; Rebs: Ulanovas 7 Asts: three players 3 PIR: Ulanovas 29 | Arena: Ülker Sports and Event Hall; Attendance: 12,635; Referees: Luigi Lamonica, Piotr Pastusiak, Milan Nedović |

| 23 April 2019 3 | Žalgiris (Lithuania) | 57–66 | (Turkey) Fenerbahçe Beko | Kaunas |
| 19:00 | Scoring by quarter: 19–15, 15–16, 12–18, 11–17 |
| | Pts: Wolters 15; Rebs: Thompson 7 Asts: Grigonis, Wolters 3 PIR: Ulanovas, Wolters 11 | Boxscore | Pts: Gudurić 17; Rebs: Datome 7 Asts: Sloukas 3 PIR: Gudurić 21 | Arena: Žalgirio Arena; Attendance: 15,517; Referees: Borys Ryzhyk, Sreten Radović, Mehdi Difallah |

| 25 April 2019 4 | Žalgiris (Lithuania) | 82–99 | (Turkey) Fenerbahçe Beko | Kaunas |
| 19:00 | Scoring by quarter: 16–30, 25–19, 20–23, 21–27 |
| | Pts: Davies 25; Rebs: Davies 7 Asts: Westermann 6 PIR: Davies 35 | Boxscore | Pts: Dixon 25; Rebs: Sloukas 5 Asts: Sloukas 10; PIR: Dixon 32 | Arena: Žalgirio Arena; Attendance: 15,177; Referees: Matej Boltauzer, Oļegs Latiševs, Elias Koromilas |

==== Final Four ====
===== Semifinal =====
| 17 May 2019 | Fenerbahçe Beko (Turkey) | 73–92 | (Turkey) Anadolu Efes | Vitoria-Gasteiz |
| 18:00 (CEST) | Scoring by quarter: 20–19, 20–26, 17–23, 16–24 |
| | Pts: Veselý 14; Rebs: Melli 4 Asts: Gudurić 6 PIR: Kalinić 15 | Boxscore | Pts: Larkin 30; Rebs: Dunston 10; Asts: Larkin 7 PIR: Larkin 43 | Arena: Fernando Buesa Arena; Attendance: 13,470; Referees: Luigi Lamonica, Oļegs Latiševs, Mehdi Difallah |

===== Third place game =====
| 19 May 2019 | Fenerbahçe Beko (Turkey) | 75–94 | (Spain) Real Madrid | Vitoria-Gasteiz |
| 17:30 (CEST) | Scoring by quarter: 16–24, 24–14, 23–31, 12–25 |
| | Pts: Sloukas 17; Rebs: Düverioğlu 9 Asts: Sloukas 6 PIR: Sloukas 18 | Boxscore | Pts: Ayón 23; Rebs: Ayón 11; Asts: Campazzo 15; PIR: Ayón 36 | Arena: Fernando Buesa Arena; Attendance: 12,866; Referees: Matej Boltauzer, Fernando Rocha, Mehdi Difallah |

==== Individual awards ====
EuroLeague MVP of the Round

- (Czech Republic) Jan Veselý – Regular Season, Round 1

EuroLeague MVP of the Month

- (Czech Republic) Jan Veselý, December

EuroLeague MVP of the Season

- (Czech Republic) Jan Veselý

=== Turkish Basketball Cup ===
==== Quarterfinal ====
| 13 February 2018 | Fenerbahçe | 78–70 | Bahçeşehir Koleji | Ankara |
| 20:30 | Scoring by quarter: 25–12, 23–21, 18–8, 12–29 |
| | Pts: Melli 20; Rebs: Lauvergne 10; Asts: Dixon 5 | Report | Pts: Rautins 20; Rebs: Slaughter 7 Asts: Colom 8 | Arena: Ankara Arena |

==== Semifinal ====
| 16 February 2018 | Fenerbahçe | 73–65 | Türk Telekom | Ankara |
| 19:00 | Scoring by quarter: 20–13, 16–20, 19–15, 18–17 |
| | Pts: Sloukas 18; Rebs: Melli 9 Asts: Sloukas 5 | Report | Pts: Landesberg 18; Rebs: Redding 7 Asts: Redding 7 | Arena: Ankara Arena |

==== Final ====
| 17 February 2018 | Anadolu Efes | 70–80 | Fenerbahçe | Ankara |
| 19:00 | Scoring by quarter: 20–16, 14–23, 23–22, 13–19 |
| | Pts: Moerman 18; Rebs: Moerman 8 Asts: Simon 3 | Report | Pts: Datome 22; Rebs: Datome 7 Asts: Sloukas 9 | Arena: Ankara Arena |

=== Turkish Basketball Presidential Cup ===
| 3 October 2018 | Fenerbahçe | 62–65 | Anadolu Efes | Ankara |
| 20:00 | Scoring by quarter: 15–17, 15–11, 6–16, 26–21 |
| | Pts: Sloukas 24; Rebs: Melli, Düverioğlu 6 Asts: Sloukas 5 | Boxscore | Pts: Moerman, Balbay 13; Rebs: Moerman 9 Asts: Micić, Simon 4 | Arena: Ankara Arena; Referees: Emin Moğulkoç, Özlem Yalman, Ahmet Tatlıcı |
