= 2019 BSL Playoffs =

BSL Playoffs
- Season: 2018–19
- Dates: 21 May – 21 June 2019
- Games played: 23
- Teams: 8

Finals
- Champions: Anadolu Efes(14th title)
- Runners-up: Fenerbahçe Beko
- Semi-finalists: Galatasaray Doğa Sigorta, Tofaş
- Finals MVP: (United States) Shane Larkin
- All statistics correct as of 21 June 2019.

2019 Basketbol Süper Ligi (BSL) Playoffs was the final phase of the 2018–19 Basketbol Süper Ligi season. The playoffs started on 21 May 2019. Fenerbahçe Beko were the defending champions.

The eight highest placed teams of the regular season qualified for the playoffs. In the quarter-finals a best-of-three was played, in the semi-finals a best-of-five and in the finals a best-of-seven playoff format was used.

Anadolu Efes competed against Fenerbahçe Beko in the finals, won the series 4-3 and got their 14th championship.

== Bracket ==
Quarterfinals
1	Anadolu Efes	2
8	Banvit	0
4	Galatasaray Doğa Sigorta	2
5	Gaziantep Basketbol	1
2	Fenerbahçe Beko	2
7	Türk Telekom	1
3	Tofaş	2
6	Beşiktaş Sompo Japan	0

Semifinals
1	Anadolu Efes	3
4	Galatasaray Doğa Sigorta	0
2	Fenerbahçe Beko	3
3	Tofaş	0

Finals
1	Anadolu Efes	4
2	Fenerbahçe Beko	3

== Quarterfinals ==
=== (1) Anadolu Efes vs. (8) Banvit ===
22 May 2019	Anadolu Efes	81–72 (Series: 1–0)	Banvit	Istanbul
20:15 EEST	Scoring by quarter: 18–24, 23–20, 23–18, 17–10
	Pts: Moerman 26; Rebs: Moerman 10; Asts: Balbay 5 PIR: Moerman 33	Boxscore	Pts: Morgan 20; Rebs: Morgan 6 Asts: Pérez 6 PIR: Morgan 22	Arena: Sinan Erdem Dome; Referees: Serkan Emlek, Fatih Arslanoğlu, Mehmet Karabilecen

25 May 2019	Banvit	77–87 (Series: 2–0)	Anadolu Efes	Bandırma
16:30 EEST	Scoring by quarter: 20–26, 21–12, 12–28, 24–21
	Pts: Pérez 19; Rebs: Geçim 7 Asts: Pérez 4 PIR: Geçim 19	Boxscore	Pts: Three players 18; Rebs: Simon, Larkin 8 Asts: Larkin 10; PIR: Larkin 27	Arena: Banvit Kara Ali Acar Sport Hall; Attendance: 2,120; Referees: Özlem Yalman, Kaan Büyükçil, Ali Şakacı

=== (2) Fenerbahçe Beko vs. (7) Türk Telekom ===
23 May 2019	Fenerbahçe Beko	82–72 (Series: 1–0)	Türk Telekom	Istanbul
20:15 EEST	Scoring by quarter: 13–19, 22–23, 21–16, 26–14
	Pts: Sloukas 18; Rebs: Melli 10; Asts: Sloukas 4 PIR: Sloukas 21	Boxscore	Pts: Štimac 14; Rebs: Štimac 11; Asts: Redding 5 PIR: Štimac 23	Arena: Ülker Sports and Event Hall; Attendance: 2,500; Referees: Yener Yılmaz, Serdar Ünal, Ayşenur Yazıcıoğlu

26 May 2019	Türk Telekom	88–85 (Series: 1–1)	Fenerbahçe Beko	Ankara
17:30 EEST	Scoring by quarter: 21–24, 27–21, 22–23, 18–17
	Pts: Campbell 26; Rebs: Gabriel 9 Asts: Redding 5 PIR: Campbell 30	Boxscore	Pts: Mahmutoğlu 19; Rebs: Kalinić 6 Asts: Kalinić 6 PIR: Muhammed, Mahmutoğlu 20	Arena: Ankara Arena; Referees: Erşan Kartal, Kerem Baki, Alper Özgök

29 May 2019	Fenerbahçe Beko	92–59 (Series: 2–1)	Türk Telekom	Istanbul
20:45 EEST	Scoring by quarter: 22–17, 24–14, 17–13, 29–15
	Pts: Kalinić 22; Rebs: Düverioğlu 8 Asts: Gudurić 6 PIR: Kalinić 27	Boxscore	Pts: Štimac 14; Rebs: Štimac 10; Asts: Štimac 3 PIR: Štimac 24	Arena: Ülker Sports and Event Hall; Referees: Emin Moğulkoç, Aytuğ Ekti, Sinan İşgüder

=== (3) Tofaş vs. (6) Beşiktaş Sompo Japan ===
23 May 2019	Tofaş	102–76 (Series: 1–0)	Beşiktaş Sompo Japan	Bursa
18:00 EEST	Scoring by quarter: 23–20, 25–25, 24–13, 30–18
	Pts: Mejía 28; Rebs: Mejía 7 Asts: Trice, Ermiş 10; PIR: Mejía 31	Boxscore	Pts: Alexander 20; Rebs: Geyik 8 Asts: Sipahi 7 PIR: Gibson 17	Arena: Tofaş Sports Hall; Attendance: 2,400; Referees: Zafer Yılmaz, Ziya Özorhon, Halit Cihan Can

26 May 2019	Beşiktaş Sompo Japan	73–82 (Series: 0–2)	Tofaş	Istanbul
15:15 EEST	Scoring by quarter: 23–18, 16–21, 13–24, 21–19
	Pts: Alexander 17; Rebs: Geyik 7 Asts: Three players 5 PIR: Geyik 7	Boxscore	Pts: Trice 17; Rebs: Kadji 5 Asts: Kadji, Ermiş 6 PIR: Mejía 18	Arena: Akatlar Arena; Attendance: 290; Referees: Emin Moğulkoç, Altuğ Köselerli, Ahmet Tatlıcı

=== (4) Galatasaray Doğa Sigorta vs. (5) Gaziantep Basketbol ===
21 May 2019	Galatasaray Doğa Sigorta	79–61 (Series: 1–0)	Gaziantep Basketbol	Istanbul
20:15 EEST	Scoring by quarter: 16–13, 27–15, 13–16, 23–17
	Pts: Webster 16; Rebs: Auguste 17; Asts: Three players 4 PIR: Auguste 20	Boxscore	Pts: Jelovac 18; Rebs: Jekiri 10; Asts: Öğüt, Vasiliauskas 4 PIR: Jelovac, Jekiri 19	Arena: Sinan Erdem Dome; Attendance: 1,000; Referees: Mehmet Keseratar, Mehmet Şahin, Osman Sinan İşgüder

25 May 2019	Gaziantep Basketbol	79–69 (Series: 1–1)	Galatasaray Doğa Sigorta	Gaziantep
15:15 EEST	Scoring by quarter: 21–22, 26–22, 18–17, 14–8
	Pts: McKissic 19; Rebs: Jekiri 5 Asts: Öğüt 6 PIR: McKissic 22	Boxscore	Pts: Harrison 20; Rebs: Hayes 8 Asts: Webster 5 PIR: Auguste 18	Arena: Karataş Şahinbey Sport Hall; Referees: Aytuğ Ekti, Semih Vural, Can Mavisu

28 May 2019	Galatasaray Doğa Sigorta	89–77 (Series: 2–1)	Gaziantep Basketbol	Istanbul
20:45 EEST	Scoring by quarter: 23–16, 25–18, 20–22, 21–21
	Pts: Webster 18; Rebs: Auguste 8 Asts: Webster 6 PIR: Webster 19	Boxscore	Pts: McKissic 22; Rebs: Jekiri 11; Asts: Vasiliauskas 8 PIR: Jekiri 21	Arena: Sinan Erdem Dome; Referees: Yener Yılmaz, Özlem Yalman, Kaan Büyükçil

== Semifinals ==
=== (1) Anadolu Efes vs. (4) Galatasaray Doğa Sigorta ===
31 May 2019	Anadolu Efes	82–77 (Series: 1–0)	Galatasaray Doğa Sigorta	Istanbul
19:00 EEST	Scoring by quarter: 22–19, 19–24, 23–20, 18–14
	Pts: Beaubois 18; Rebs: Dunston 10; Asts: Moerman, Tuncer 5 PIR: Beaubois 24	Boxscore	Pts: Harrison 17; Rebs: Auguste 13; Asts: Harrison 6 PIR: Auguste 20	Arena: Sinan Erdem Dome; Attendance: 1,190; Referees: Zafer Yılmaz, Serdar Ünal, Alper Özgök

2 June 2019	Anadolu Efes	80–68 (Series: 2–0)	Galatasaray Doğa Sigorta	Istanbul
16:30 EEST	Scoring by quarter: 24–14, 22–16, 21–12, 13–26
	Pts: Larkin, Dunston 12; Rebs: Dunston 7 Asts: Micić 8 PIR: Dunston 20	Boxscore	Pts: Çinko 12; Rebs: Auguste 8 Asts: Three players 3 PIR: Arapović 12	Arena: Sinan Erdem Dome; Referees: Aytuğ Ekti, Ziya Özorhon, Sinan İşgüder

5 June 2019	Galatasaray Doğa Sigorta	72–78 (Series: 0–3)	Anadolu Efes	Istanbul
19:00 EEST	Scoring by quarter: 15–17, 21–24, 15–21, 21–16
	Pts: Harrison 24; Rebs: Harrison 7 Asts: Four players 2 PIR: Harrison 22	Boxscore	Pts: Motum 24; Rebs: Anderson 10; Asts: Micić 11; PIR: Micić 31	Arena: Sinan Erdem Dome; Attendance: 2,816; Referees: Emin Moğulkoç, Fatih Arslanoğlu, Mehmet Zafer Milli

=== (2) Fenerbahçe Beko vs. (3) Tofaş ===
1 June 2019	Fenerbahçe Beko	102–68 (Series: 1–0)	Tofaş	Istanbul
18:00 EEST	Scoring by quarter: 32–22, 27–17, 24–11, 19–18
	Pts: Melli 27; Rebs: Kalinić, Düverioğlu 5 Asts: Sloukas 6 PIR: Melli, Düverioğlu 24	Boxscore	Pts: Durmaz 16; Rebs: Durmaz 7 Asts: Trice 5 PIR: Durmaz 15	Arena: Ülker Sports and Event Hall; Attendance: 3,600; Referees: Mehmet Keseratar, Altuğ Köselerli, Mehmet Şahin

3 June 2019	Fenerbahçe Beko	68–64 (Series: 2–0)	Tofaş	Istanbul
21:00 EEST	Scoring by quarter: 17–13, 17–10, 22–21, 12–20
	Pts: Gudurić 12; Rebs: Kalinić 7 Asts: 5 players 2 PIR: Kalinić 13	Boxscore	Pts: Mejía 16; Rebs: Arslan 6 Asts: Trice 7 PIR: Mejía 16	Arena: Ülker Sports and Event Hall; Attendance: 3,500; Referees: Yener Yılmaz, Kaan Büyükçil, Can Mavisu

6 June 2019	Tofaş	71–76 (Series: 0–3)	Fenerbahçe Beko	Bursa
19:00 EEST	Scoring by quarter: 14–25, 14–17, 15–19, 28–15
	Pts: Three players 14; Rebs: Mejía 6 Asts: Trice 7 PIR: Elegar, Mejía 17	Boxscore	Pts: Muhammed 12; Rebs: Kalinić 13; Asts: Kalinić 5 PIR: Kalinić 27	Arena: Tofaş Sports Hall; Attendance: 6,800; Referees: Özlem Yalman, Serkan Emlek, Mehmet Karabilecen

== Finals ==
=== (1) Anadolu Efes vs. (2) Fenerbahçe Beko ===
9 June 2019	Anadolu Efes	56–73 (Series: 0–1)	Fenerbahçe Beko	Istanbul
17:00 EEST	Scoring by quarter: 10–18, 22–24, 4–20, 20–11
	Pts: Micić 16; Rebs: Moerman 7 Asts: Larkin 4 PIR: Larkin 13	Boxscore	Pts: Muhammed 22; Rebs: Melli 7 Asts: Muhammed 4 PIR: Muhammed 22	Arena: Sinan Erdem Dome; Attendance: 8,500; Referees: Aytuğ Ekti, Zafer Yılmaz, Altuğ Köselerli

11 June 2019	Anadolu Efes	101–93(OT) (Series: 1–1)	Fenerbahçe Beko	Istanbul
18:45 EEST	Scoring by quarter: 14–20, 26–32, 25–17, 21–17, Overtime: 15–7
	Pts: Micić 30; Rebs: Dunston 7 Asts: Micić, Larkin 6 PIR: Micić 28	Boxscore	Pts: Melli 22; Rebs: Melli, Güler 5 Asts: Sloukas 11; PIR: Melli, Gudurić 19	Arena: Sinan Erdem Dome; Attendance: 7,000; Referees: Yener Yılmaz, Özlem Yalman, Sinan İşgüder

13 June 2019	Fenerbahçe Beko	57–74 (Series: 1–2)	Anadolu Efes	Istanbul
21:00 EEST	Scoring by quarter: 17–22, 9–14, 19–20, 12–18
	Pts: Kalinić 17; Rebs: Melli 11; Asts: Melli, Gudurić 2 PIR: Melli 17	Boxscore	Pts: Beaubois, Larkin 19; Rebs: Moerman 13; Asts: Larkin, Dunston 4 PIR: Beaubois 23	Arena: Ülker Sports and Event Hall; Attendance: 9,000; Referees: Mehmet Keseratar, Emin Moğulkoç, Kaan Büyükçil

15 June 2019	Fenerbahçe Beko	82–73 (Series: 2–2)	Anadolu Efes	Istanbul
17:00 EEST	Scoring by quarter: 25–15, 17–22, 20–20, 20–16
	Pts: Melli 19; Rebs: Düverioğlu 11; Asts: Kostas Sloukas 6 PIR: Düverioğlu 20	Boxscore	Pts: Micić 16; Rebs: Beaubois, Moerman 6 Asts: Micić 9 PIR: Micić 17	Arena: Ülker Sports and Event Hall; Attendance: 13,000; Referees: Serkan Emlek, Mehmet Şahin, Can Mavisu

17 June 2019	Anadolu Efes	86–76 (Series: 3–2)	Fenerbahçe Beko	Istanbul
20:00 EEST	Scoring by quarter: 27–20, 12–17, 27–10, 20–29
	Pts: Moerman 26; Rebs: Moerman 8 Asts: Micić 9 PIR: Moerman 31	Boxscore	Pts: Sloukas 22; Rebs: Melli 7 Asts: Melli 5 PIR: Sloukas 25	Arena: Sinan Erdem Dome; Referees: Mehmet Keseratar, Emin Moğulkoç, Serdar Ünal

19 June 2019	Fenerbahçe Beko	85–69 (Series: 3–3)	Anadolu Efes	Istanbul
20:00 EEST	Scoring by quarter: 17–14, 21–22, 15–16, 32–17
	Pts: Gudurić 21; Rebs: Düverioğlu 8 Asts: Sloukas 8 PIR: Gudurić 24	Boxscore	Pts: Larkin 16; Rebs: Moerman 7 Asts: Micić, Tuncer 4 PIR: Larkin, Dunston 13	Arena: Ülker Sports and Event Hall; Attendance: 9,000; Referees: Aytuğ Ekti, Ziya Özorhon, Sinan İşgüder

21 June 2019	Anadolu Efes	89–74 (Series: 4–3)	Fenerbahçe Beko	Istanbul
20:00 EEST	Scoring by quarter: 21–23, 23–14, 25–21, 20–16
	Pts: Larkin 38; Rebs: Simon 7 Asts: Micić, Larkin 4 PIR: Larkin 35	Boxscore	Pts: Sloukas 21; Rebs: Melli 6 Asts: Sloukas 6 PIR: Sloukas 26	Arena: Sinan Erdem Dome; Referees: Emin Moğulkoç, Zafer Yılmaz, Kaan Büyükçil

2019 BSL Champions
Anadolu Efes
14th Title
