= Alican Güney =

Turkish basketball player (born 1989)

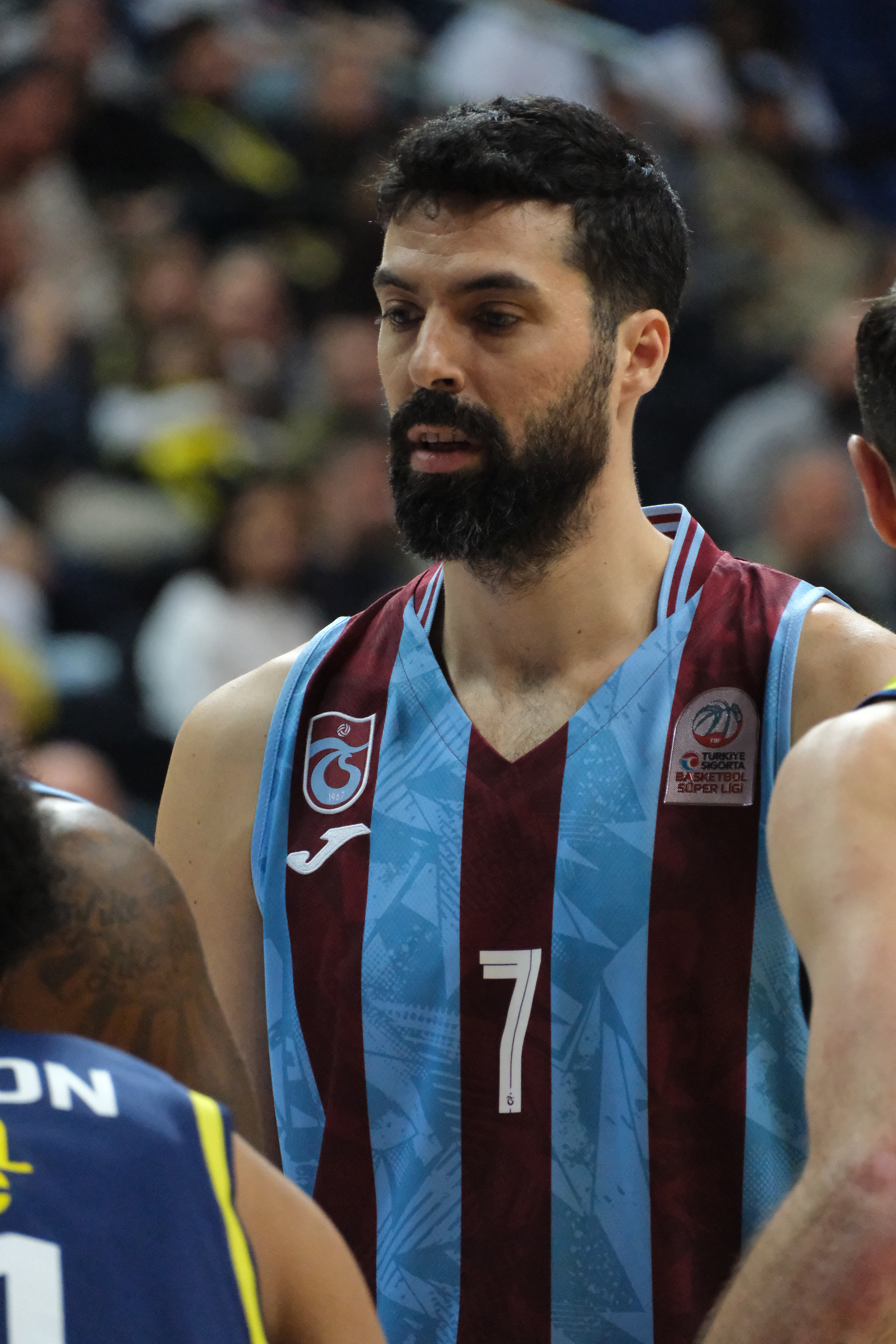
- Güney with Trabzonspor in 2026

No. 7 – Trabzonspor
- Position: Small forward
- League: Türkiye Basketbol Ligi

Personal information
- Born: February 25, 1989 (age 37) Istanbul, Turkey
- Listed height: 6 ft 6 in (1.98 m)

Career information
- Playing career: 2007–present

Career history
- 2007–2008: Fenerbahçe Ülker
- 2008–2010: Galatasaray Café Crown
- 2010–2011: Olin Edirne
- 2011–2012: Antalya BB
- 2012–2013: Trabzonspor
- 2013–2014: Tüyap Büyükçekmece
- 2014–2015: Yeşilgiresun Belediye
- 2015–2016: Afyon Belediye
- 2016–2017: İstanbulspor
- 2017–2018: Balıkesir Büyükşehir Belediysepor
- 2018–2019: Yeni Mamak
- 2019–2021: Manisa Büyükşehir Belediyespor
- 2021–2022: OGM Ormanspor
- 2022–2023: Antalya Güneşi
- 2023: Harem Spor
- 2023–2024: Ankaragücü Mamak
- 2024–present: Trabzonspor

Career highlights
- Türkiye Basketbol Ligi champion (2025)

Alican Güney (born 25 February 1989) is a Turkish professional basketball player for Trabzonspor of the Türkiye Basketbol Ligi (TBL).
