= Nusret Yıldırım =

Turkish basketball player

Free Agent
- Position: Power forward

Personal information
- Born: April 27, 1989 (age 37) Bakırköy, Istanbul, Turkey
- Listed height: 6 ft 8 in (2.03 m)
- Listed weight: 231 lb (105 kg)

Career information
- Playing career: 2007–present

Career history
- 2007–2008: Galatasaray
- 2008–2010: TTNet Beykoz
- 2010–2011: İstanbulspor
- 2011–2013: Erdemir
- 2013–2014: Mersin BB
- 2014–2015: Trabzonspor
- 2015–2016: Banvit B.K.
- 2016–2017: Acıbadem Üniversitesi
- 2017–2019: Türk Telekom
- 2019–2021: Pınar Karşıyaka
- 2021–2023: Petkim Spor
- 2023–2024: Ayos Spor
- 2024: Bursaspor Basketbol
- 2024–2025: Trabzonspor

Career highlights
- Türkiye Basketbol Ligi champion (2025)

Nusret Yıldırım (born April 27, 1989) is a Turkish professional basketball player who last played for Trabzonspor of the Türkiye Basketbol Ligi (TBL). He plays as a power forward.
