= Tolga Geçim =

Turkish basketball player (born 1996)

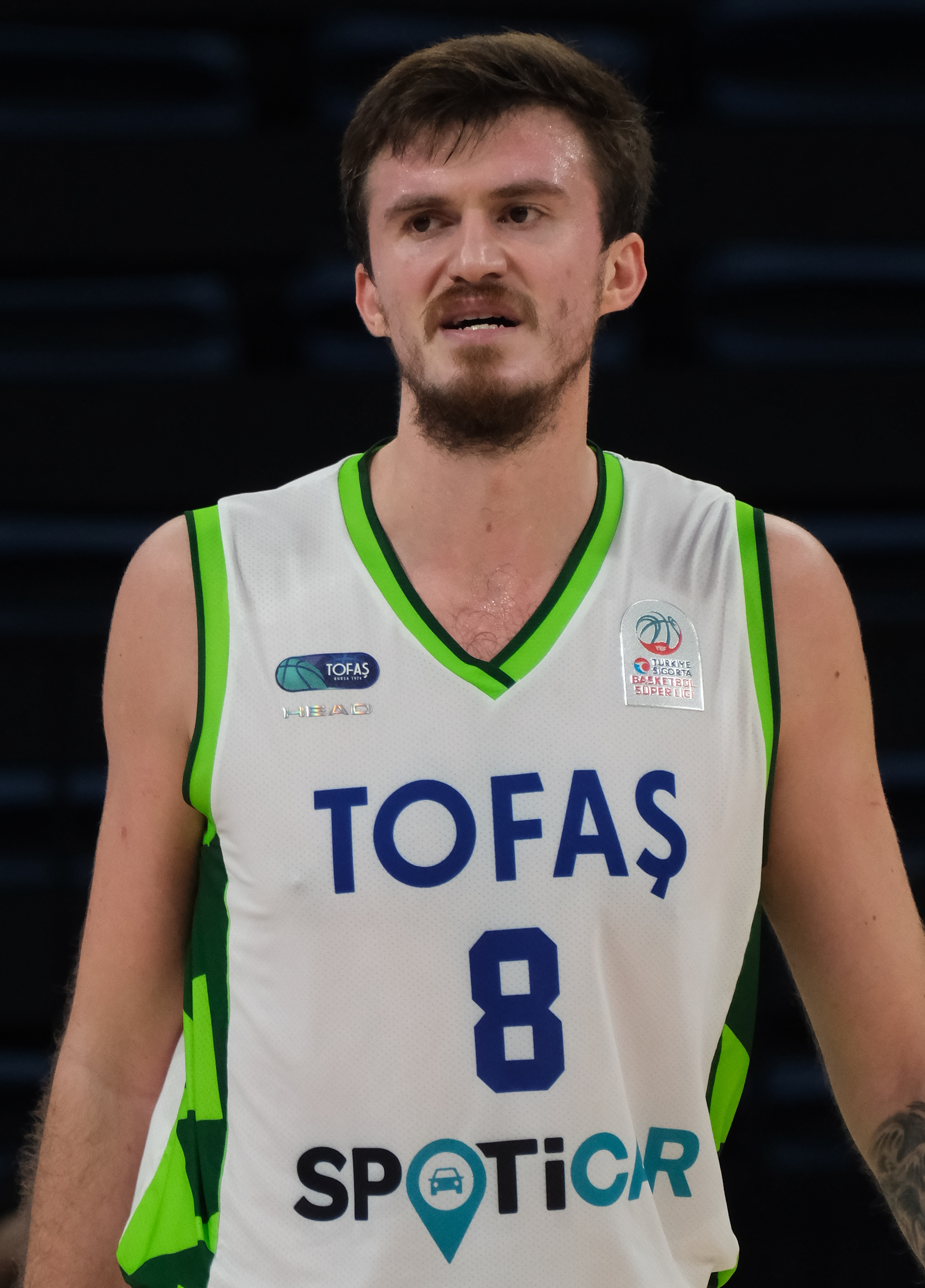
- Geçim with Tofaş in 2025

No. 8 – Trabzonspor
- Position: Small forward / power forward
- League: Basketbol Süper Ligi; FIBA Champions League

Personal information
- Born: March 27, 1996 (age 30) Adana, Turkey
- Listed height: 6 ft 9 in (2.06 m)
- Listed weight: 200 lb (91 kg)

Career information
- Playing career: 2012–present

Career history
- 2012–2014: Bandırma Kırmızı
- 2014–2019: Banvit
- 2019–2022: Anadolu Efes
- 2022: Frutti Extra Bursaspor
- 2022–2026: Tofaş
- 2026–present: Trabzonspor

Career highlights
- EuroLeague champion (2021); Turkish BSL league champion (2021); Turkish Cup champion (2017); BSL All-Star (2016)
Medals
Men's basketball
Representing Turkey
FIBA Europe Under-20 Championship
Bronze medal – third place	2016 Finland	U-20 team
FIBA Under-19 World Cup
Bronze medal – third place	2015 Turkey	U-19 team
FIBA Europe Under-18 Championship
Gold medal – first place	2014 Turkey	U-18 team

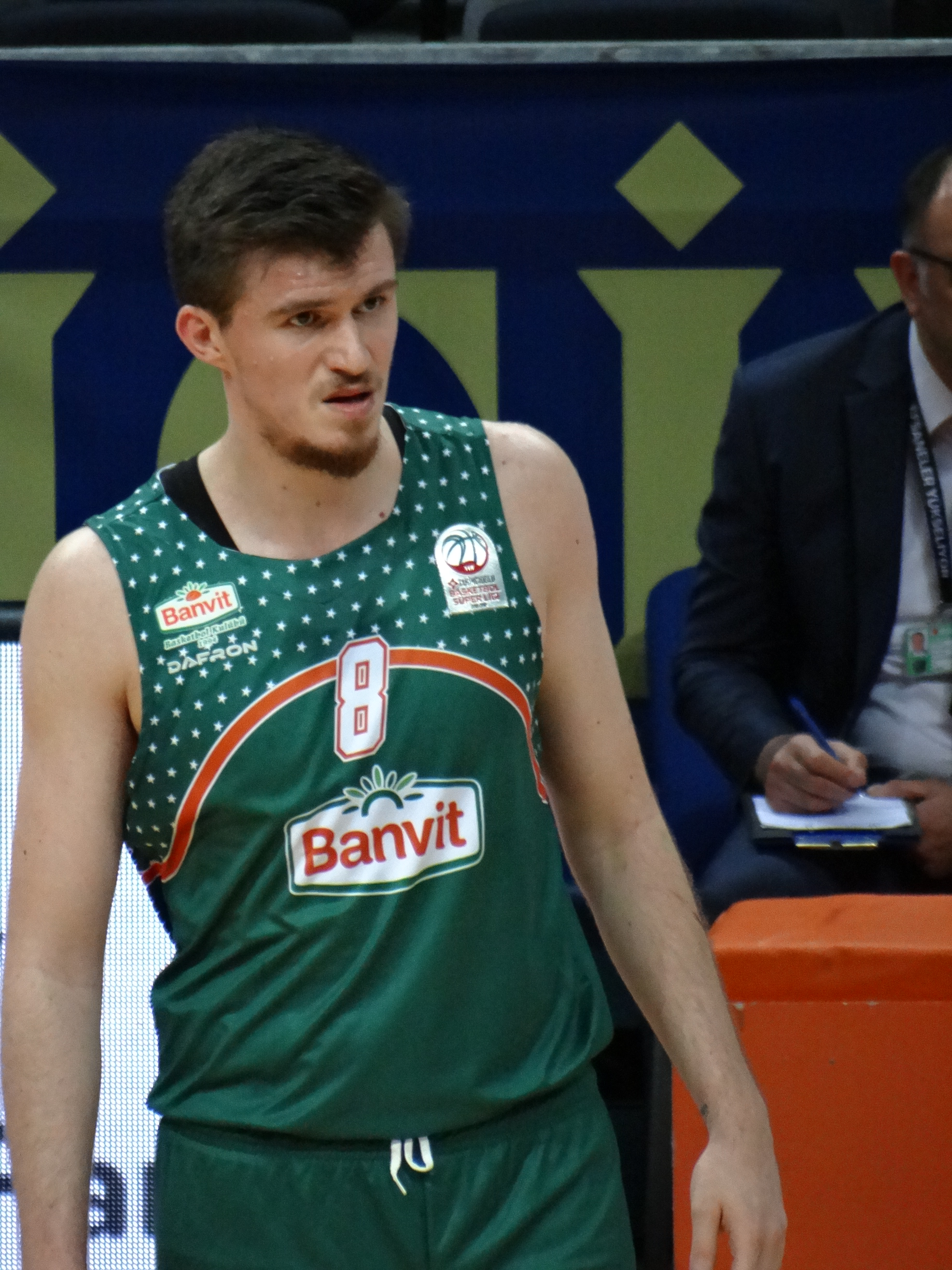
Geçim in 2019

Tolga Geçim (born March 27, 1996) is a Turkish professional basketball player for Trabzonspor of the Turkish Basketbol Süper Ligi (BSL) and the FIBA Champions League. He mainly plays the small forward position, but he also has the ability to play as a point guard and power forward if needed.

== Professional career ==
=== Early years ===
Geçim was born in Adana. He started playing basketball with Adana Çınarlıspor. He moved to the Banvit junior team in 2008.

=== Banvit ===
In early years, he played for the junior, star and youth teams of Banvit. He was loaned for the 2012–13 and 2013–14 season to TB2L team Bandırma Kırmızı which is the pilot club of Banvit. In the summer of 2014, Geçim moved to Banvit first team.

=== Anadolu Efes ===
On June 24, 2019, he has signed 2 years contract with Turkish giants Anadolu Efes.

=== Frutti Extra Bursaspor ===
On January 7, 2022, he has signed with Frutti Extra Bursaspor of the Turkish Basketbol Süper Ligi (BSL).

=== Tofaş ===
On November 21, 2022, he signed with Tofaş of Basketbol Süper Ligi (BSL).

=== Trabzonspor ===
On June 2, 2026, he signed with Trabzonspor of the Basketbol Süper Ligi (BSL).

== Career statistics ==
Legend
GP	Games played	GS	Games started	MPG	Minutes per game
FG%	Field-goal percentage	3P%	3-point field-goal percentage	FT%	Free-throw percentage
RPG	Rebounds per game	APG	Assists per game	SPG	Steals per game
BPG	Blocks per game	PPG	Points per game	PIR	Performance index rating
**Bold**	Career high

=== EuroLeague ===
†	Denotes seasons in which Geçim won the EuroLeague

Year	Team	GP	GS	MPG	FG%	3P%	FT%	RPG	APG	SPG	BPG	PPG	PIR
2019–20	Anadolu Efes	**9**	1	4.1	.063	.100	—	.6	**.7**	—	—	0.3	-0.4
2020–21†	Anadolu Efes	6	1	5.5	.222	.000	—	**.8**	.3	—	—	0.7	-0.2
2021–22	Anadolu Efes	6	**2**	**6.5**	**.429**	**.400**	—	.3	**.7**	**.2**	—	**1.3**	**1.0**
Career		21	4	5.2	.188	.176	—	.6	.6	.0	—	0.7	0.0
