= Trabzonspor B.K. =

Trabzonspor
- Leagues: Basketbol Süper Ligi; Champions League
- Founded: 2008; 18 years ago
- Arena: Hayri Gür Arena
- Capacity: 7,500
- Location: Trabzon, Turkey
- Team colors: Claret, blue
- Chairman: Ertuğrul Doğan
- President: Cömert Küce
- General manager: Fazıl Uluçelik
- Head coach: Hakan Demir
- Team captain: Tolga Geçim
- Championships: 3 Turkish Second Divisions
- Website: trabzonspor.org.tr
Home	Away

Trabzonspor Basketbol Kulübü (transl. Trabzonspor Basketball Club), also known as Trabzonspor Basket or Trabzonspor, is a professional basketball club based in the city of Trabzon, Turkey. It is a department of the multi-sport club of Trabzonspor. Trabzonspor competed in the Basketbol Süper Ligi, the top tier of Turkish basketball, for seven seasons before withdrawing in 2018 due to financial difficulties. The club resumed its basketball operations at the beginning of 2024 and went on to win the Türkiye Basketbol Ligi championship in the 2024–25 season, earning promotion back to the Basketbol Süper Ligi.

Their home arena is the Hayri Gür Arena, which has a capacity of 7,500 seats, and was opened in 2011.

== History ==
Trabzonspor's football club was founded in 1967, and it opened its basketball section in 2008. After Alpella's relegation in the 2007–08 season, Trabzonspor's board purchased all of the rights related to the team from the Ülker Group, and took their place in the Turkish Second Division for the 2008–09 season.

Trabzonspor promoted to the top-tier TBL (now called BSL), after they won the championship of the Turkish Division in the 2009–10 season.

In the 2014–15 season, Trabzonspor made its European debut in the EuroChallenge. The club managed to reach the Final Four which was played in its home arena Hayri Gür Arena. In the semi-final, Trabzonspor beat Romanian side Energia by a wide margin, 63–83. In the final, the team narrowly lost to JSF Nanterre from France with a score of 63–64. Nanterre scored a buzzer-beater which costed Trabzon its first European title.

In 2015, Trabzonspor played in the EuroCup Basketball competition, Europe's second tier. Here, it was eliminated in the Round of 32.

On 2 October 2018, Trabzonspor announced its withdrawal from the BSL due to financial problems. Eventually, the club ceased its basketball activities.

Trabzonspor has announced its decision to return to professional basketball in 2024. After a long hiatus, the club re-entered at the Men's Regional Basketball League level in February 2024.

After winning promotion to the Turkish Basketball Second League, the club received an invitation from the Turkish Basketball Federation to move up to the Türkiye Basketbol Ligi for the 2024–25 season.

On April 13, 2025, Trabzonspor was promoted to the Basketbol Süper Ligi as the champion of the Turkish Basketball First League. They were back to top tier, after seven years break.

== Sponsporship names ==
- Trabzonspor : 2008–2010
- Medical Park Trabzonspor : 2010–2011
- Trabzonspor : 2011–2013
- Trabzonspor Medical Park : 2013–2017
- Trabzonspor : 2017–2018
- Trabzonspor : 2024–present

== Achievements ==
- Turkish Basketball League

Fourth: (1) 2015

- Turkish Second League

Winners (3): 2010, 2013, 2025

- EuroChallenge

Runners-up: (1) 2015

== Season by season ==
Season	Tier	League	Pos.	Turkish Cup	European competitions		
2008–09	2	TB2L	3rd				
2009–10	2	TB2L	1st				
2010–11	1	TBL	11th	Semifinalist			
2011–12	1	TBL	15th	Group Stage			
2012–13	2	TB2L	1st				
2013–14	1	TBL	9th	Quarterfinalist			
2014–15	1	TBL	4th	Group Stage	3 EuroChallenge	RU	14–2
2015–16	1	BSL	11th	Quarterfinalist	2 Eurocup	L32	8–8
2016–17	1	BSL	12th				
2017–18	1	BSL	13th		4 FIBA Europe Cup	QR1	1–1
2018–2024	Stopped basketball operations						
2024–25	2	TBL	1st				
2025–26	1	BSL	6th	Quarterfinalist			

== Players ==
=== Current roster ===
Note: Flags indicate national team eligibility at FIBA-sanctioned events. Players may hold other non-FIBA nationalities not displayed.

Trabzonspor roster
Players
Coaches

Pos.	No.	Nat.	Name	Ht.	Age
PG	1	(United States)	Keene, Marcus	1.78 m (5 ft 10 in)	31 – 6 May 1995
G	3	(United States)	Harrison, Shaquille	1.93 m (6 ft 4 in)	33 – 6 October 1993
G/F	5	(United States)	Boston Jr., Brandon	1.98 m (6 ft 6 in)	24 – 28 November 2001
G/F	7	(Turkey)	Arslan, Yiğit	1.93 m (6 ft 4 in)	30 – 12 May 1996
F	8	(Turkey)	Geçim, Tolga (C)	2.06 m (6 ft 9 in)	30 – 27 March 1996
F	9	(Turkey)	Bircan, Batu	1.96 m (6 ft 5 in)	20 – 10 April 2006
SG	14	(Turkey)	Güney, Alican	1.96 m (6 ft 5 in)	37 – 25 February 1989
SF	15	(United Kingdom)	Yeboah, Akwasi	1.98 m (6 ft 6 in)	29 – 15 June 1997
PF	17	(United States)	Hamm Jr., Royce	2.06 m (6 ft 9 in)	27 – 17 March 1999
C	19	(Turkey)	Arar, Ege	2.08 m (6 ft 10 in)	30 – 2 September 1996
SF	22	(Turkey)	Mestoğlu, Yiğit Hamza	2.03 m (6 ft 8 in)	22 – 22 April 2004
F/C	23	(United States)	Tillman, Xavier	2.03 m (6 ft 8 in)	27 – 12 January 1999
F/C	33	(United States)	Terry, Emanuel	2.06 m (6 ft 9 in)	30 – 21 August 1996
PF	45	(United States)	Manek, Brady	2.06 m (6 ft 9 in)	28 – 4 September 1998
PG	99	(Turkey)	Öncel, Rıdvan	1.91 m (6 ft 3 in)	29 – 21 February 1997

Head coach

- (Turkey) Hakan Demir

Assistant coach(es)

- (Turkey) Erhan Yetim
- (Turkey) Olcay Özkundilli
- (Turkey) Batıkan Kumuk

Team manager

- (Turkey) Cömert Küce

Legend

- (C) Team captain
- Injured

- Roster
Updated: 12 November 2026

=== BCL Depth chart ===
Pos.	Starting 5	Bench 1	Bench 2	Bench 3
C	Emanuel Terry	Ege Arar		Xavier Tillman
PF	Brady Manek	Royce Hamm	Yiğit Hamza Mestoğlu
SF	Akwasi Yeboah	Tolga Geçim		Batu Bircan
SG	Yiğit Arslan	Brandon Boston Jr.	Alican Güney
PG	Marcus Keene	Rıdvan Öncel		Shaquille Harrison

=== BSL Depth chart ===
Pos.	Starting 5	Bench 1	Bench 2	Bench 3
C	Emanuel Terry*	Ege Arar		Xavier Tillman*
PF	Brady Manek*	Royce Hamm Jr*	Yiğit Hamza Mestoğlu
SF	Akwasi Yeboah*	Tolga Geçim		Batu Bircan
SG	Yiğit Arslan	Brandon Boston Jr.*	Alican Güney
PG	Marcus Keene*	Rıdvan Öncel		Shaquille Harrison*

- BSL requires a maximum of 7 registered foreign players per squad, with no more than 4 foreign players allowed on the court at any given time. Crucially, at least 1 Turkish player must remain on the floor during every second of game play. Foreign players are shown with an asterisk (*).

=== Notable players ===
Note: Flags indicate national team eligibility at FIBA-sanctioned events. Players may hold other non-FIBA nationalities not displayed.

Criteria

To appear in this section a player must have either:

- Set a club record or won an individual award while at the club
- Played at least one official international match for their national team at any time
- Played at least one official NBA match at any time.

- (Turkey) Alper Saruhan
- (Turkey) Berk Demir
- (Turkey) Berkay Candan
- (Turkey) Birkan Batuk
- (Turkey) Can Altıntığ
- (Turkey) Can Korkmaz
- (Turkey) Can Maxim Mutaf
- (Turkey) Deniz Kılıçlı
- (Turkey) Erolcan Çinko
- (Turkey) İsmail Cem Ulusoy
- (Turkey) Kaya Peker
- (Turkey) Kerem Özkan
- (Turkey) Nusret Yıldırım
- (Turkey) Okben Ulubay
- (Turkey) Polat Kaya
- (Turkey) Sertaç Şanlı
- (Turkey) Tutku Açık
- (Turkey) Can Uğur Öğüt
- (Australia) Mitch Creek
- (Bosnia and Herzegovina) Andrija Stipanović
- (Bulgaria) Kaloyan Ivanov
- (Croatia) Jurica Žuža
- (Dominican Republic) Angel Delgado
- (Lithuania) Šarūnas Vasiliauskas
- (Mexico) Jorge Gutierrez
- (New Zealand) Kirk Penney
- (Poland) Damian Kulig
- (Serbia) Aleksandar Rašić
- (Serbia) Novica Veličković
- (Serbia) - (Greece) Igor Milošević
- (United States) Darius Johnson-Odom
- (United States) Dee Bost
- (United States) Derwin Kitchen
- (United States) Dwight Hardy
- (United States) Elton Brown
- (United States) Harold Jamison
- (United States) J.P. Prince
- (United States) Jack Cooley
- (United States) Jerome Randle
- (United States) Jonathan Gibson
- (United States) Julian Wright
- (United States) Kevinn Pinkney
- (United States) Khalid El-Amin
- (United States) Marc Salyers
- (United States) Mike Scott
- (United States) Russell Robinson
- (United States) Sean Marshall
- (United States) Tarence Kinsey
- (United States) Tony Taylor
- (United States) Troy Caupain
- (United States) Ty Gordon
- (United States) - (Georgia (country)) Marcquise Reed
- (United States) - (Mexico) Paul Stoll
- (United States) - (Nigeria) Derrick Obasohan
- (United States) - (Nigeria) Gani Lawal
- (United States) - (Turkey) Michael Wright

== Head coaches ==
- (Turkey) Alaeddin Yakan (2008–09, 2009–10, 2010–11)
- (Serbia) Dragan Sakota (2010–11)
- (Turkey) Tolga Öngören (2011–12)
- (Turkey) Halil Üner (2011–12, 2012–13)
- (Turkey) Hasan Özmeriç (2012–13, 2013–14)
- (Turkey) Hakan Demir (2013–14, 2014–15, 2026–present)
- (Bosnia and Herzegovina) Nenad Markovic (2014–15, 2015–16)
- (Turkey) Ahmet Kandemir (2015–16)
- (Russia) Sergey Bazarevich (2016–17)
- (North Macedonia) Zare Markovski (2017–18)
- (Turkey) Hacı Osman Ekici (2023–24)
- (Turkey) Faruk Beşok (2024–25)
- (Turkey) Selçuk Ernak (2025–2026)

== See also ==
- Trabzonspor
