= Marko Gudurić =

Serbian basketball player (born 1995)

Marko Gudurić Марко Гудурић
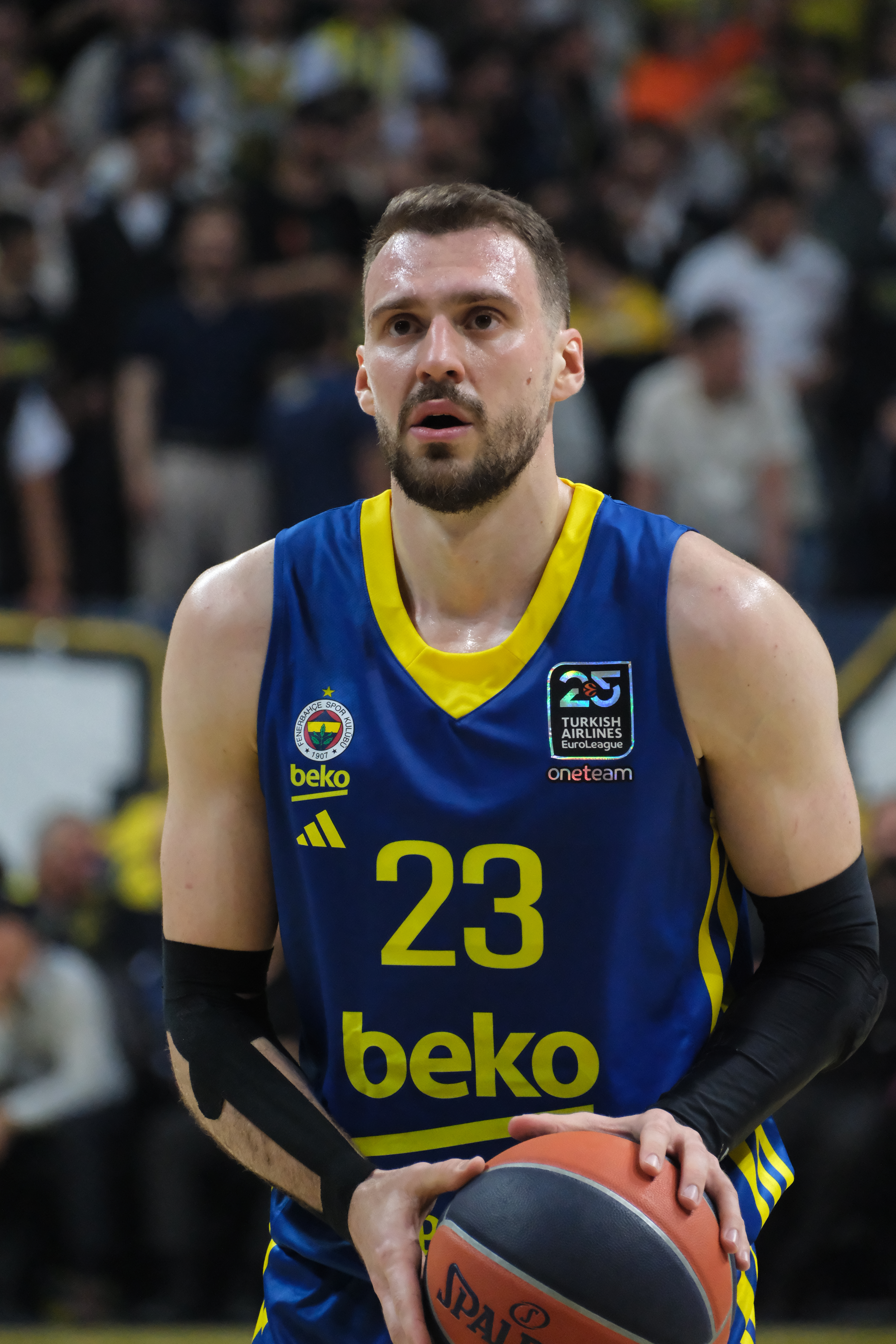
- Gudurić with Fenerbahçe in 2025

No. 23 – Olimpia Milano
- Position: Shooting guard / small forward
- League: LBA; EuroLeague

Personal information
- Born: March 8, 1995 (age 31) Priboj, Serbia, FR Yugoslavia
- Listed height: 6 ft 6 in (1.98 m)
- Listed weight: 201 lb (91 kg)

Career information
- NBA draft: 2017: undrafted
- Playing career: 2013–present

Career history
- 2013–2017: Crvena zvezda
- 2013–2015: →FMP
- 2017–2019: Fenerbahçe
- 2019–2020: Memphis Grizzlies
- 2019–2020: →Memphis Hustle
- 2020–2025: Fenerbahçe
- 2025–present: Olimpia Milano

Career highlights
- EuroLeague champion (2025); 4× Turkish League champion (2018, 2022, 2024, 2025); 2× ABA League champion (2016, 2017); 2× Serbian League champion (2016, 2017); 3× Turkish Cup winner (2019, 2024, 2025); Italian Cup winner (2026); Serbian Cup winner (2017); 2× Italian Supercup winner (2025, 2026); Turkish Presidential Cup winner (2017); Serbian Cup MVP (2017); FIBA Europe Under-20 Championship MVP (2015)
- Stats at NBA.com
- Stats at Basketball Reference
Medals
Men's basketball
Representing Serbia
Olympic Games
Bronze medal – third place	2024 Paris	Team
FIBA World Cup
Silver medal – second place	2023 Philippines–Japan–Indonesia
EuroBasket
Silver medal – second place	2017 Finland–Israel–Romania–Turkey
U20 European Championship
Gold medal – first place	2015 Italy	Team

Marko Gudurić (Serbian Cyrillic: Марко Гудурић, born March 8, 1995) is a Serbian professional basketball player for Olimpia Milano of the Italian Lega Basket Serie A (LBA) and the EuroLeague. He also represents the senior Serbian national basketball team internationally. Standing at 6 ft 6 in (1.98 m), he plays at the shooting guard and small forward positions.

== Professional career ==
=== Crvena zvezda (2013–2017) ===
Gudurić grew up with Crvena zvezda youth teams and signed his first professional contract in April 2013. He played two seasons for the Crvena zvezda development team FMP.

On September 30, 2015, Gudurić re-signed for Crvena zvezda to a four-year deal. On October 15, 2015, he made his EuroLeague debut against SIG Basket with 6 points, 4 assists, 3 rebounds and 4 steals. One of his best moments was against Real Madrid when he had a crucial dunk to get Crvena zvezda four-point lead one minute before the end of the game on November 27, 2015. On December 18, 2015, Zvezda played a game against Bayern Munich for qualifying in TOP 16 of EuroLeague, Gudurić made some unconventional three-pointers and had 16 points in an amazing comeback win in front of raucous atmosphere in Pionir Hall. On July 5, 2016, he made a three-point buzzer-beater against their biggest rival Partizan in Game 2 of KLS Finals to secure Zvezda 2–0 lead and final result 86–87.

Gudurić started his sophomore season in EuroLeague great with 21 points, 5 assists, and 4 rebounds to provide a win versus FC Barcelona Lassa in Round 3.

=== Fenerbahçe (2017–2019) ===
On July 14, 2017, Gudurić signed a four-year contract with Turkish club Fenerbahçe.

In the 2017–18 EuroLeague, Fenerbahçe made it to the 2018 EuroLeague Final Four, its fourth consecutive Final Four appearance. Eventually, they lost to Real Madrid with 80–85 in the final game. Over 36 EuroLeague games, he averaged 6.7 points, 1.6 rebounds and 1.9 assists per game, while also having very high shooting percentages.

In the 2018–19 EuroLeague season, Gudurić was among the most valuable roster pieces that brought Fenerbahçe to their fifth consecutive Final Four appearance. However, at the 2019 EuroLeague Final Four, Fenerbahçe lost in the semifinal game to their arch-rivals Anadolu Efes and later again in the third-place game to Real Madrid. Over the season, Gudurić averaged career-high 9.4 points and 2.2 assists per game while shooting 47.7% from three-point territory. In the end of the season, Fenerbahçe lost the Turkish League championship after being defeated with 4–3 in the finals of 2019 BSL Playoffs to Anadolu Efes.

=== Memphis Grizzlies (2019–2020) ===
On July 31, 2019, Gudurić signed a multi-year contract with the Memphis Grizzlies of the NBA. On October 23, 2019, Gudurić made his debut in NBA, coming off from the bench in a 101–120 loss to the Miami Heat with nine points, two rebounds and two assists. On January 30, 2020, Gudurić was suspended for one game without pay for leaving the bench during an altercation between the Grizzlies and the New York Knicks. During the 2019–20 season, he appeared in 44 regular season games, averaging 3.9 points, 1.7 rebounds and 1 assist on 39.5% shooting from the field.

He did not appear in a single game during the 2020–21 regular season. On December 15, 2020, the Grizzlies waived him.

=== Return to Fenerbahçe (2020–2025) ===
On December 18, 2020, Gudurić signed a contract with Fenerbahçe until the end of the 2022–23 season. On March 4, 2023, he officially renewed his contract through 2026.

On May 25, 2025, Gudurić helped Fenerbahçe to their second EuroLeague championship in Abu Dhabi. He helped the team defeat the defending champions Panathinaikos in the semi-final, and Monaco in the final with 19 points and 6 rebounds.

== National team career ==
Gudurić represented Serbia at the EuroBasket 2017 where they won the silver medal, after losing in the final game to Slovenia.

At the 2019 FIBA Basketball World Cup, the national team of Serbia was dubbed as favorite to win the trophy, but was eventually upset in the quarterfinals by Argentina. With wins over the United States and Czech Republic, it finished in fifth place. Gudurić averaged 5.6 points, 1.1 rebounds and 1.1 assists over 7 tournament games. He won the bronze medal at the 2024 Summer Olympics with Serbia.

== Career statistics ==
Legend
GP	Games played	GS	Games started	MPG	Minutes per game
FG%	Field-goal percentage	3P%	3-point field-goal percentage	FT%	Free-throw percentage
RPG	Rebounds per game	APG	Assists per game	SPG	Steals per game
BPG	Blocks per game	PPG	Points per game	PIR	Performance index rating
**Bold**	Career high

=== NBA ===
==== Regular season ====
Year	Team	GP	GS	MPG	FG%	3P%	FT%	RPG	APG	SPG	BPG	PPG
2019–20	Memphis	44	0	11.0	.395	.301	.923	1.7	1.0	.3	.2	3.9
Career		44	0	11.0	.395	.301	.923	1.7	1.0	.3	.2	3.9

=== EuroLeague ===
*	Led the league
†	Won the league

Year	Team	GP	GS	MPG	FG%	3P%	FT%	RPG	APG	SPG	BPG	PPG	PIR
2015–16	Crvena zvezda	24	1	15.6	.420	.371	.810	1.5	1.4	.6	.0	7.1	5.8
2016–17	Crvena zvezda	29	4	18.8	.391	.304	.859	2.1	2.1	.6	.1	7.8	6.4
2017–18	Fenerbahçe	36*	17	16.6	.547	.446	.875	1.6	1.9	.7	—	6.7	7.1
2018–19	Fenerbahçe	36	18	22.1	.549	**.477**	.843	1.9	2.2	**.9**	.2	9.4	10.2
2020–21	Fenerbahçe	21	21	**25.8**	.451	.417	.844	2.7	2.3	.8	**.3**	12.2	10.8
2021–22	Fenerbahçe	28	10	20.5	.442	.362	.817	2.2	2.8	.8	.1	10.3	9.8
2022–23	Fenerbahçe	**38**	5	23.8	.481	.402	.833	**3.0**	**3.2**	**.9**	.0	**12.3**	**12.8**
2023–24	Fenerbahçe	37	9	21.5	.453	.336	**.901**	2.5	2.5	.8	—	9.1	9.6
2024–25†	Fenerbahçe	36	**25**	22.0	**.582**	.384	.883	2.6	3.1	.7	**.3**	10.9	11.9
Career		285	110	20.5	.564	.389	.853	2.2	2.4	.8	.2	9.5	9.5

=== Domestic leagues ===
†	Denotes seasons in which Gudurić won the domestic league

Year	Team	League	GP	MPG	FG%	3P%	FT%	RPG	APG	SPG	BPG	PPG
2013–14	(Serbia) FMP	KLS-FL	24	22.7	.514	.382	.789	3.9	1.9	1.0	.3	10.9
2013–14	(Serbia) FMP	KLS	13	27.0	.436	.314	.688	4.2	1.6	1.1	.5	10.3
2014–15	(Serbia) FMP	KLS-FL	22	28.2	.546	.456	.793	5.3	3.3	1.6	.4	15.6
2014–15	(Serbia) FMP	KLS	14	23.7	.426	.226	.818	4.1	2.1	1.1	.1	12.6
2015–16†	(Serbia) Crvena zvezda	KLS	10	12.3	.500	.444	.769	1.4	1.4	.8	.1	5.2
2015–16†	(Serbia) Crvena zvezda	ABA	30	16.0	.416	.329	.869	1.3	1.9	.6	.1	6.9
2016–17†	(Serbia) Crvena zvezda	KLS	19	20.8	.500	.404	.862	2.5	2.8	.9	.0	8.1
2016–17†	(Serbia) Crvena zvezda	ABA	30	18.7	.508	.398	.845	2.6	2.4	1.0	.1	9.0
2017–18†	(Turkey) Fenerbahçe	TBSL	30	20.3	.565	.436	.844	2.1	2.2	.8	.2	8.1
2018–19	(Turkey) Fenerbahçe	TBSL	35	24.6	.485	.371	.913	2.7	2.7	1.1	.0	11.2
2019–20	(United States) Memphis Hustle	G League	1	27.8	.615	.500	.500	3.0	3.0	3.0	1.0	20.0
2020–21	(Turkey) Fenerbahçe	TBSL	18	25.4	.366	.313	.818	2.3	2.4	.7	.1	9.8
2021–22†	(Turkey) Fenerbahçe	TBSL	28	20.4	.435	.388	.883	2.5	3.0	.7	.1	10.5
2022–23	(Turkey) Fenerbahçe	TBSL	21	21.8	.508	.376	.897	2.0	3.7	1.1	.0	10.8
2023–24†	(Turkey) Fenerbahçe	TBSL	19	21.4	.482	.231	.952	2.7	3.6	.6	.0	8.5

== See also ==
- List of Serbian NBA players
