= Erolcan Çinko =

Turkish basketball player (born 1990)

No. 15 – Bandırma Bordo
- Position: Shooting guard
- League: Türkiye Basketbol Ligi

Personal information
- Born: 15 August 1990 (age 36) Bandırma, Balıkesir, Turkey
- Listed height: 6 ft 2 in (1.88 m)
- Listed weight: 179 lb (81 kg)

Career information
- Playing career: 2008–present

Career history
- 2008–2013: Banvit
- 2013–2014: Olin Edirne
- 2014–2015: Tofaş
- 2015–2016: TED Ankara Kolejliler
- 2016–2017: Trabzonspor
- 2017–2018: Gaziantep
- 2018–2019: Galatasaray
- 2019–2020: Gaziantep
- 2020–2021: OGM Ormanspor
- 2021–2022: Petkim Spor
- 2022–2023: Sigortam.net İTÜ BB
- 2024–present: Bandırma Bordo

Erolcan Çinko (born 15 August 1990) is a Turkish professional basketball player, who plays as a shooting guard and now is free agent.
