= Berkan Durmaz =

Turkish basketball player (born 1997)

- Image of Berkan Durmaz

No. 3 – Galatasaray
- Position: Power forward
- League: Basketbol Süper Ligi

Personal information
- Born: February 20, 1997 (age 29) Osmangazi, Turkey
- Listed height: 6 ft 9 in (2.06 m)
- Listed weight: 200 lb (91 kg)

Career information
- Playing career: 2015–present

Career history
- 2015–2021: Tofaş
- 2021–2023: Pınar Karşıyaka
- 2023–2024: Beşiktaş
- 2024–2026: Türk Telekom
- 2026–present: Galatasaray
Medals
Men's basketball
Representing Turkey
European U-18 Championship
| Silver medal – second place | 2015 Greece | Team |

Berkan Durmaz (born February 20, 1997) is a Turkish professional basketball player for Galatasaray of the Basketbol Süper Ligi (BSL). Standing at 6 ft 9 in (2.06 m), he plays as power forward.

== Professional career ==
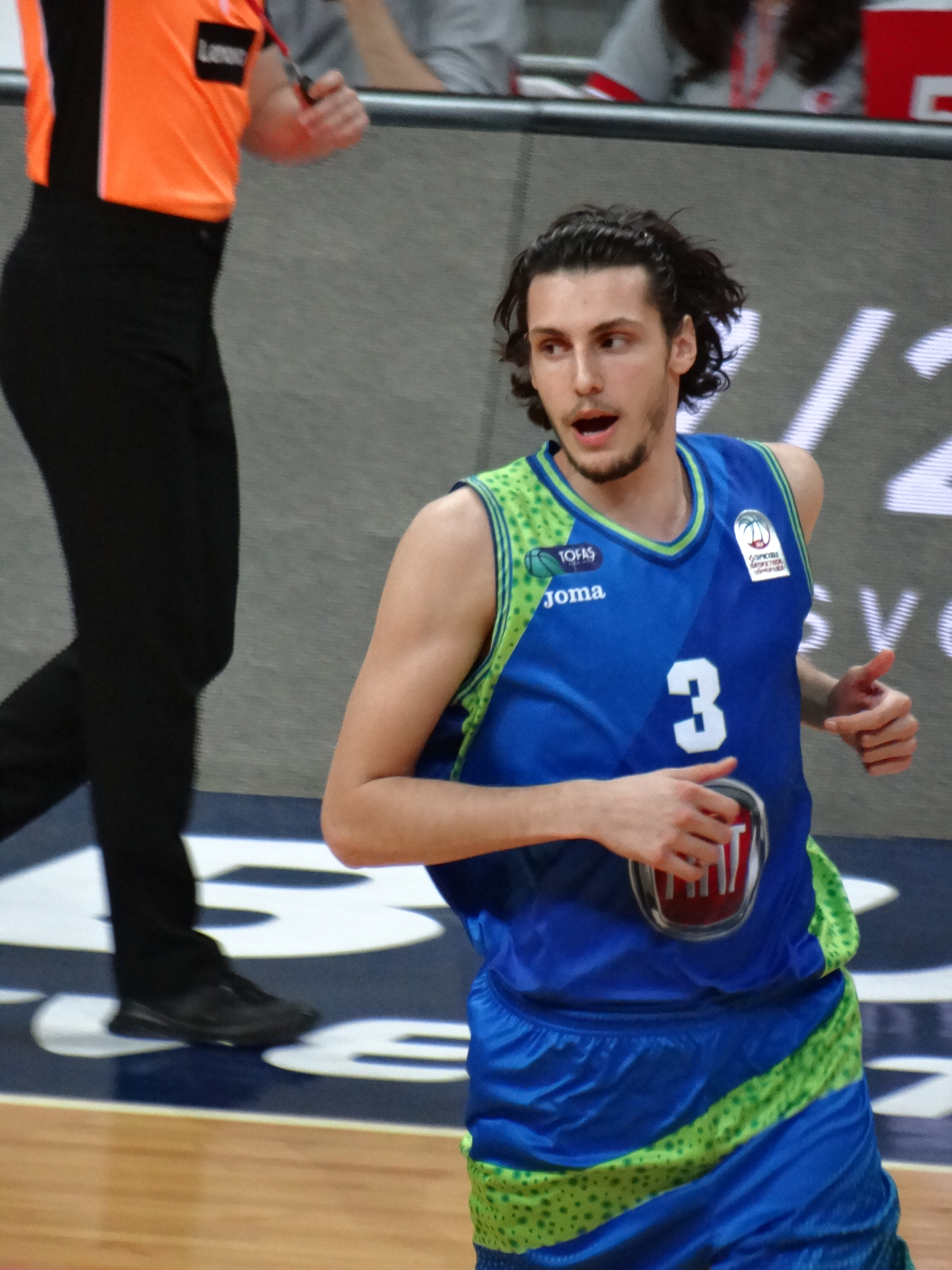
Durmaz in 2018

Born in Osmangazi in Bursa, Durmaz cut his teeth in the youth system of Tofaş S.K., before making his debut in professional basketball during the 2015–16 season. He saw action for Tofas in the TBL as well as for the club's reserve squad in the TBL2.

On July 2, 2021, he has signed with Pınar Karşıyaka of the Turkish Super League (BSL).

On July 4, 2023, he signed with Beşiktaş of the Turkish Basketbol Süper Ligi (BSL).

On June 27, 2024, he signed with Türk Telekom of the Turkish Basketbol Süper Ligi (BSL).

On July 5, 2026, he signed with Galatasaray of the Turkish Basketbol Süper Ligi (BSL).

== International career ==
Durmaz represented the Turkish national basketball team at the 2013 under-16 and the 2015 under-18 European Championships.
