= Jordan Morgan (basketball) =

American-born Slovenian basketball player

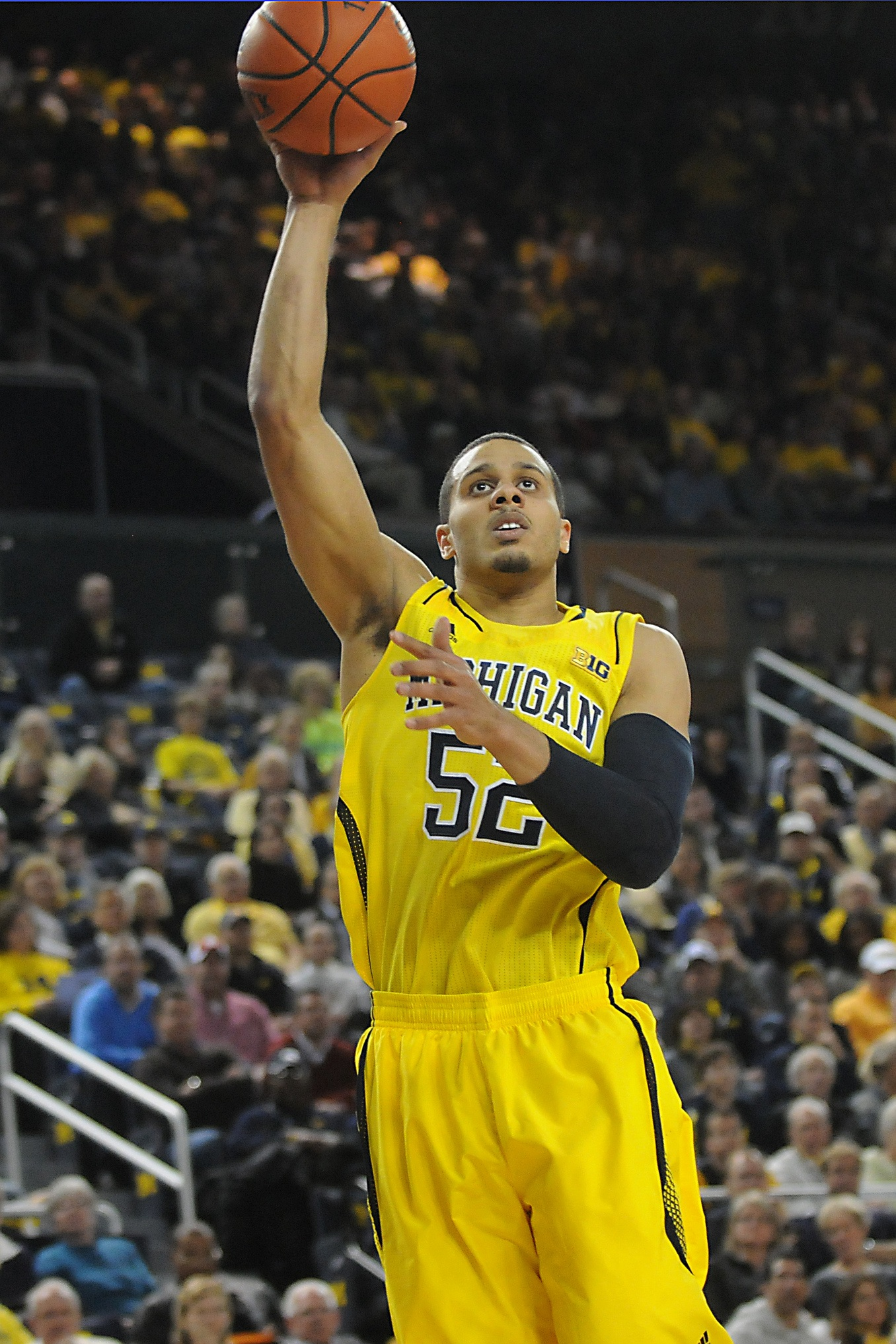
- Morgan in 2012 with Michigan

Free agent
- Position: Center / power forward

Personal information
- Born: September 15, 1991 (age 35) Scott Air Force Base, Illinois, U.S.
- Listed height: 6 ft 8 in (2.03 m)
- Listed weight: 246 lb (112 kg)

Career information
- High school: University of Detroit Jesuit (Detroit, Michigan)
- College: Michigan (2010–2014)
- NBA draft: 2014: undrafted
- Playing career: 2014–present

Career history
- 2014–2015: Virtus Roma
- 2015–2016: Nantes
- 2016: Paris-Levallois
- 2016: Canton Charge
- 2016–2017: Kymis
- 2017–2018: Petrol Olimpija
- 2018–2019: Banvit
- 2019–2020: Pınar Karşıyaka
- 2020–2021: UNICS Kazan
- 2022: Reyer Venezia
- 2022–2023: Konyaspor
- 2023: Lokomotiv Kuban
- 2023–2024: AEK Athens
- 2024–2025: Suwon KT Sonicboom

Career highlights
- Slovenian League champion (2018); Slovenian Supercup winner (2017); Big Ten All-Defensive team (2013)

Jordan Daniel Morgan (born September 15, 1991) is an American-born naturalized Slovenian professional basketball player who last played for Suwon KT Sonicboom of the Korean Basketball League (KBL). He played college basketball for the Michigan Wolverines. He represents the Slovenia basketball team internationally.

== Early life ==
Morgan was born Jordan Daniel Konkoly in Scott Air Force Base in Illinois to Meredith Morgan née Konkoly and Bobby Deloach on September 15, 1991. His biological father was largely absent in his life from birth. His mother raised him as a single mother until she married his adoptive father, Jim Morgan in 2001. He was adopted by his stepfather when he was 12 years old and he took his last name. Morgan graduated from the University of Detroit Jesuit High School and Academy. At Detroit Jesuit, Morgan played on the varsity basketball team all four years and was a starter for three. Over his high school career, he averaged 14.5 points, 10.1 rebounds, and 2.3 blocks per game. During his senior year Morgan averaged 20 points per game.

Morgan verbally committed to Michigan on December 18, 2007; his other scholarship offers were from Central Michigan, Oakland, and Xavier.

College recruiting
Name	Hometown	School	Height	Weight	Commit date
Jordan Morgan; C	Detroit, MI	University of Detroit Jesuit HS	6 ft 8 in (2.03 m)	240 lb (110 kg)	Dec 18, 2007
Jordan Morgan; C	Recruit ratings: Scout: Rivals: 247Sports: (75)				
Overall recruit ranking: Scout: 32 (national C), 5 (MI C) 247Sports: 9 (MI)
Note: In many cases, Scout, Rivals, 247Sports, On3, and ESPN may conflict in their listings of height and weight.; In these cases, the average was taken. ESPN grades are on a 100-point scale.; Sources: "2009 Michigan Basketball Commitment List". Rivals.; "2009 Michigan College Basketball Team Recruiting Prospects". Scout.; "Michigan Wolverines 2009 Player Commits". ESPN.; "Scout.com Team Recruiting Rankings". Scout.; "2009 Team Ranking". Rivals.; "Michigan 2009 Basketball Commits". 247Sports.

== College career ==
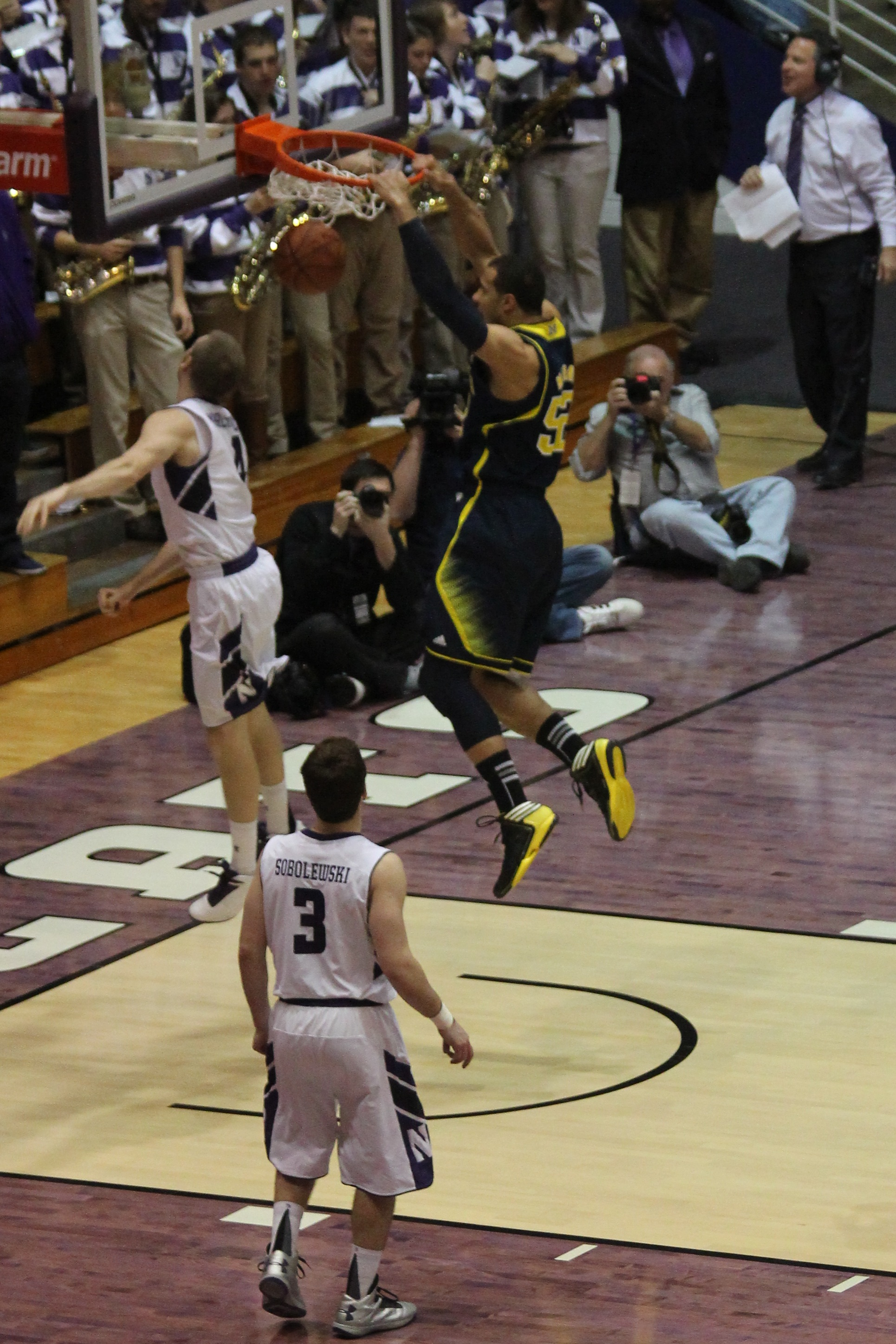
Morgan for the 2012–13 Wolverines

At the University of Michigan, Morgan redshirted his freshman season on the Michigan Wolverines men's basketball team due to a knee injury. Morgan then played 142 games for Michigan from the 2010–11 to 2013–14 seasons at the power forward position. 142 games was a school record that was tied by Zak Irvin, and later surpassed by Muhammad-Ali Abdur-Rahkman (144) during the 2017–18 season. He led the Big Ten Conference in field goal percentage 66.1% (Big Ten), 62.7% (all games). He made 63.1% of his field goal attempts and scored 973 points in his Michigan career. During his sophomore season, the team clinched a share of the 2011–12 Big Ten Conference season regular season championship. As a junior on the Michigan team that became runners-up in the 2013 NCAA Men's Division I Basketball Championship Game, Morgan earned Big Ten All-Defensive honors. During his senior season, Michigan clinched its first outright (unshared) Big Ten Conference championship since 1985–86.

Morgan completed his B.S.E. in industrial and operations engineering from the University of Michigan College of Engineering in April 2012, after his third year at Michigan. He was also selected to the Michigan honor society Order of Angell. In 2014, Morgan earned his M.S. in manufacturing engineering, also from Michigan. When President Barack Obama spoke at the University of Michigan in April 2014 to advocate raising the federal minimum wage, Obama praised Morgan for undertaking graduate studies in engineering and being a student-athlete at Michigan. The White House also sent Morgan a letter signed by Obama congratulating Morgan for his academic achievements and describing him as "part of an elite community of scholars and leaders."

== Professional career ==
After going undrafted in the 2014 NBA draft, Morgan played with the Minnesota Timberwolves for NBA Summer League. On July 27, 2014, Morgan signed with Pallacanestro Virtus Roma of the Italian Lega Basket Serie A. In 34 games, he averaged 8.1 points and 6.5 rebounds.

On July 23, 2015, Morgan signed with Hermine de Nantes Atlantique. He averaged 9.3 points and 5.8 rebounds per game. On January 26, 2016, Morgan signed with Paris-Levallois. On March 22, he parted ways with Paris-Levallois. Three days later, he was acquired by the Canton Charge of the NBA Development League. On March 26, he made his debut for the Charge in a 122–111 win over the Erie BayHawks, recording one point, six rebounds, two assists and one steal in 11 minutes off the bench.

On August 23, 2016, Morgan signed with Kymis of the Greek Basket League.

On July 4, 2017, he signed a one-year deal with Slovenian club Olimpija.

On July 26, 2019, he has signed a contract with Pınar Karşıyaka of the Turkish Basketbol Süper Ligi.

Morgan signed with Russian club UNICS Kazan on June 15, 2020.

On January 16, 2022, he signed with Reyer Venezia of the Lega Basket Serie A.

On June 27, 2022, he signed with Konyaspor of the Turkish Basketbol Süper Ligi (BSL).

On July 19, 2023, he signed with Lokomotiv Kuban of the VTB United League.

On December 27, 2023, he signed with Greek club AEK Athens, replacing Mfiondu Kabengele.

On November 18, 2024, Morgan joined Suwon KT Sonicboom of the Korean Basketball League, replacing Jeremiah Tilmon. On December 9, he was replaced by Ismael Romero. On March 1, 2025, he rejoined the team, replacing Ismael Romero. On March 10, he was replaced by Jarell Martin.

== Charitable endeavors ==
After graduating from the University of Michigan, Morgan registered a charitable organization under the name Jordan Morgan Foundation, whose stated mission is "To inform, empower, and inspire academically disadvantaged and socially underserved youth."
