= Yiğit Arslan =

Turkish basketball player (born 1996)

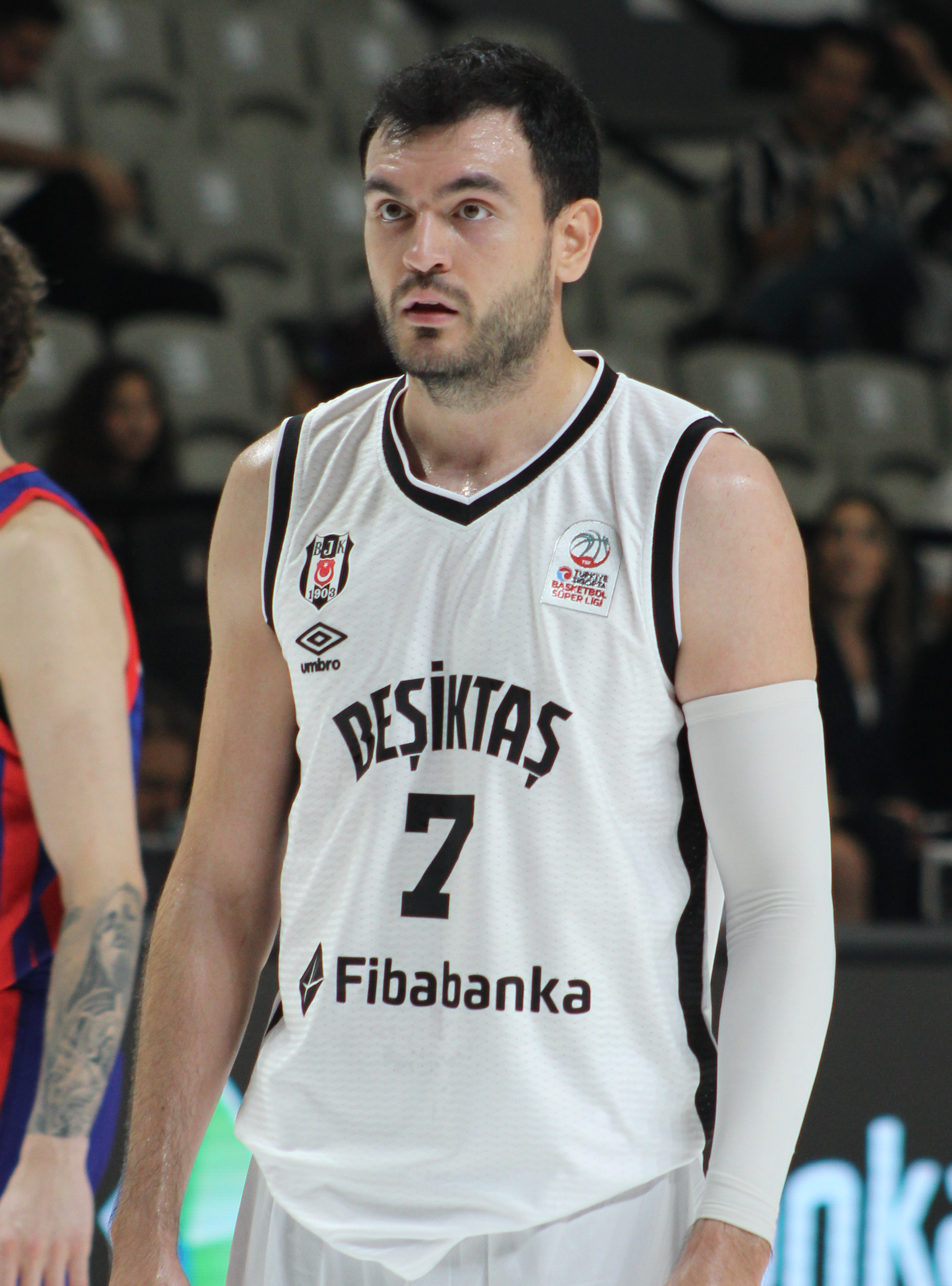

No. 7 – Trabzonspor
- Position: Shooting guard
- League: BSL; FIBA Champions League

Personal information
- Born: 12 May 1996 (age 30) Osmangazi, Turkey
- Listed height: 6 ft 4 in (1.93 m)
- Listed weight: 200 lb (91 kg)

Career information
- NBA draft: 2014: undrafted
- Playing career: 2014–present

Career history
- 2014–2019: Tofaş
- 2019–2021: Galatasaray S.K.
- 2021–2022: Tofaş
- 2022–2023: Bahçeşehir Koleji
- 2023–2026: Beşiktaş
- 2026–present: Trabzonspor

Yiğit Arslan (born 12 May 1996) is a Turkish professional basketball player for Trabzonspor of the Turkish Basketbol Süper Ligi (BSL) and the FIBA Champions League. He also represents the Turkish national team.

== Professional career ==
=== Tofaş (2014–2019) ===
Arslan started his professional career at Tofaş in 2014 at the age of 18, in the 2014–15 season, he averaged 2.6 point, 1.4 rebound and 0.5 assist. In the 2015–16 season, he averaged 6.1 point, 1.8 rebound and 1.1 assists. In the 2016–17 season, he averaged 3.5 point, 1.5 rebound and 0.8 assists. In the 2017–18 season, he averaged 4.8 point, 1.6 rebound and 1 assists In the 2017–18 season at Tofaş, he averaged 6.7 point, 2.7 rebound and 1.7 assists.

=== Galatasaray (2019–2021) ===
Before the 2019–20 season, he moved to the Galatasaray S.K. team.

=== Tofaş (2021–2022) ===
On July 1, 2021, he has signed with Tofaş and returned where his professional career has started.

=== Bahçeşehir Koleji (2022–2023) ===
On June 21, 2022, he has signed with Bahçeşehir Koleji of the Turkish Basketball Super League (BSL).

=== Beşiktaş (2023–2026) ===
On June 23, 2023, he signed with Beşiktaş of the Turkish Basketbol Süper Ligi (BSL).

=== Trabzonspor (2026–present) ===
On June 15, 2026, he signed with Trabzonspor of the Basketbol Süper Ligi (BSL).

== National team career ==
=== Junior teams ===
Arslan represented Turkey at the 2014 FIBA U18 European Championship in Konya, Turkey, where he averaged 4.4 points, 2.7 rebounds and 0.3 assists. A year later, he played at the 2015 FIBA Under-19 World Cup, where he averaged 5.6 points, 2.4 rebounds and 0.6 assists. He also represented the Turkish national under-20 team at the 2016 FIBA U20 European Championship in Finland, where he averaged 9.4 points, 4.3 rebounds and 2 assists.

=== Senior team ===
Arslan represented the Turkish national team at the 2019 FIBA World Cup in China, where he averaged 0.7 points, 1 rebound and 0.3 assists.
