= 2026–27 EuroLeague regular season =

International basketball club competition in Europe

The 2026–27 EuroLeague regular season will begin on 24 September 2026 and end on 16 April 2027. A total of 20 teams will compete in the regular season to decide the 10 places in the postseason of the 2026–27 EuroLeague.

A total of ten countries will be represented in the regular season. This will be the eleventh season with the round-robin format, which replaces the group format used until the 2015–16 season. Beşiktaş will make its return to the European top flight, after a 14-year absence since the 2012–13 season.

== Format ==
The regular season will begin on 24 September 2026 and conclude on 16 April 2027. The 20 teams will play against each other home-and-away in a round-robin format over 38 rounds where only 10 teams will advance to the postseason. Moreover, the top six teams from regular season will receive a bye to the playoffs, while the teams placed from 7th to 10th will participate in the play-in to get the last two playoff spots. At the tail end of the standings, teams placed from 11th to 20th will be eliminated after the regular season.

=== Tiebreakers ===
Teams will be ranked according to their win–loss record. If two or more teams are equal on win–loss record upon completion of the regular season, the following tiebreaking criteria are applied, in the order given, to determine their rankings:

1. Best record in head-to-head games between all tied teams.
2. Higher cumulative score difference in head-to-head games between all tied teams.
3. Higher cumulative score difference for the entire regular season.
4. Higher total of points scored for the entire regular season.
5. Higher sum of quotients of points in favor and points against of each match played in the regular season.

If a tiebreaker does not resolve a tie completely, a new tiebreak process is initiated with only those teams that remain tied. All points scored in extra periods will not be counted in the standings, nor for any tie-break situation.

== Schedule ==
Below is the schedule of the regular season for the 2026–27 EuroLeague.

Round	Dates
Round 1	24–25 September 2026
Round 2	29–30 September 2026
Round 3	1–2 October 2026
Round 4	7–9 October 2026
Round 5	13–14 October 2026
Round 6	15–16 October 2026
Round 7	22–23 October 2026
Round 8	27–28 October 2026
Round 9	29–30 October 2026
Round 10	5–6 November 2026
Round 11	11–13 November 2026
Round 12	17–18 November 2026
Round 13	19–20 November 2026
Round 14	24–25 November 2026
Round 15	3–4 December 2026
Round 16	10–11 December 2026
Round 17	15–16 December 2026
Round 18	17–18 December 2026
Round 19	22–23 December 2026

Round	Dates
Round 20	29–30 December 2026
Round 21	6–8 January 2027
Round 22	12–13 January 2027
Round 23	14–15 January 2027
Round 24	21–22 January 2027
Round 25	28–29 January 2027
Round 26	2–3 February 2027
Round 27	4–5 February 2027
Round 28	10–12 February 2027
Round 29	4–5 March 2027
Round 30	9–10 March 2027
Round 31	11–12 March 2027
Round 32	18–19 March 2027
Round 33	23–24 March 2027
Round 34	25–26 March 2027
Round 35	31 March–2 April 2027
Round 36	6–7 April 2027
Round 37	8–9 April 2027
Round 38	15–16 April 2027

== League table ==
Pos	Team	Pld	W	L	PF	PA	PD	Qualification
1	(Spanish Basketball Federation) Valencia Basket	13	10	3	1221	1117	+104	Qualification to playoffs
2	(Hellenic Basketball Federation) Olympiacos	13	10	3	1122	1031	+91	Qualification to playoffs
3	(Hellenic Basketball Federation) Panathinaikos AKTOR	13	9	4	1102	1008	+94	Qualification to playoffs
4	(United Arab Emirates Basketball Association) Dubai Basketball	13	9	4	1112	1091	+21	Qualification to playoffs
5	(Turkish Basketball Federation) Fenerbahçe Tarfin	13	8	5	1080	1005	+75	Qualification to playoffs
6	(Basketball Federation of Serbia) Crvena zvezda Meridianbet	13	8	5	1071	1021	+50	Qualification to playoffs
7	(Spanish Basketball Federation) Barcelona	13	8	5	1149	1122	+27	Qualification to play-in
8	(Lithuanian Basketball Federation) Žalgiris	13	8	5	1115	1094	+21	Qualification to play-in
9	(Spanish Basketball Federation) Real Madrid	13	7	6	1227	1152	+75	Qualification to play-in
10	(Israeli Basketball Association) Hapoel IBI Tel Aviv	13	7	6	1175	1138	+37	Qualification to play-in
11	(Basketball Federation of Serbia) Partizan Mozzart Bet	13	7	6	1005	1001	+4	
12	(French Federation of Basketball) Paris Basketball	13	7	6	1168	1200	−32	
13	(Turkish Basketball Federation) Anadolu Efes	13	6	7	1127	1123	+4	
14	(Turkish Basketball Federation) Beşiktaş	13	6	7	1132	1156	−24	
15	(Italian Basketball Federation) Virtus Bologna	13	5	8	1118	1169	−51	
16	(German Basketball Federation) Bayern Munich	13	4	9	1156	1229	−73	
17	(French Federation of Basketball) LDLC ASVEL	13	4	9	1136	1247	−111	
18	(Italian Basketball Federation) Armani Olimpia Milan	13	3	10	1063	1129	−66	
19	(Israeli Basketball Association) Maccabi Rapyd Tel Aviv	13	3	10	1083	1175	−92	
20	(Spanish Basketball Federation) Kosner Baskonia	13	1	12	1042	1196	−154	

Updated to match(es) played on 20 November 2026. Source: EuroLeague
Rules for classification: Regular season tiebreakers

== Round by round tables ==
=== Positions by round ===
The table lists the positions of teams after completion of each round. In order to preserve chronological evolvements, any postponed matches are not included in the round at which they were originally scheduled, but added to the full round they were played immediately afterwards.

Leader and qualification to playoffs	Qualification to playoffs	Qualification to play-in

Team ╲ Round	1	2	3	4	5	6	7	8	9	10	11	12	13	14	15	16	17	18	19	20	21	22	23	24	25	26	27	28	29	30	31	32	33	34	35	36	37	38
Anadolu Efes	15	9	11	15	17	13	13	14	14	12	12	14	13																									
Barcelona	6	10	6	9	7	10	9	8	8	7	4	6	7																									
Bayern Munich	9	14	14	17	14	15	16	17	18	17	18	18	16																									
Beşiktaş	12	7	9	7	12	11	14	13	11	13	13	12	14																									
Crvena zvezda Meridianbet	14	15	12	6	5	5	8	7	3	2	6	9	6																									
Dubai Basketball	10	6	8	12	10	8	6	9	9	6	9	7	4																									
Armani Olimpia Milan	18	13	15	20	19	19	19	19	19	19	19	19	18																									
Fenerbahçe Tarfin	5	2	2	4	3	2	2	4	7	4	7	3	5																									
Hapoel IBI Tel Aviv	13	11	7	11	6	6	5	3	6	9	10	10	10																									
Kosner Baskonia	19	20	18	19	20	20	20	20	20	20	20	20	20																									
LDLC ASVEL	4	12	16	13	15	17	17	15	15	16	15	16	17																									
Maccabi Rapyd Tel Aviv	16	18	20	18	17	16	15	18	17	18	17	17	19																									
Olympiacos	2	5	5	3	4	3	4	5	2	5	3	2	2																									
Panathinaikos AKTOR	1	1	1	1	1	1	1	1	1	1	2	4	3																									
Paris Basketball	20	19	17	16	16	18	18	16	16	14	14	13	12																									
Partizan Mozzart Bet	3	3	4	5	8	12	11	11	12	11	11	11	11																									
Real Madrid	11	16	19	13	11	9	7	6	4	8	5	8	9																									
Valencia Basket	8	4	3	2	2	4	3	2	5	3	1	1	1																									
Virtus Bologna	17	17	13	10	9	7	10	12	13	15	16	15	15																									
Žalgiris	7	8	10	8	13	14	12	10	10	10	8	5	8																									

Updated to match(es) played on 20 November 2026. Source: EuroLeague

=== Results by round ===
The table lists the results of teams in each round.

Win	Loss

Team ╲ Round	1	2	3	4	5	6	7	8	9	10	11	12	13	14	15	16	17	18	19	20	21	22	23	24	25	26	27	28	29	30	31	32	33	34	35	36	37	38
Anadolu Efes	L	W	L	L	L	W	W	L	W	L	W	L	W																									
Barcelona	W	L	W	L	W	L	W	W	W	W	W	L	L																									
Bayern Munich	W	L	L	L	W	L	L	L	L	W	L	L	W																									
Beşiktaş	L	W	L	W	L	W	L	L	W	L	W	W	L																									
Crvena zvezda Meridianbet	L	L	W	W	W	W	L	W	W	W	L	L	W																									
Dubai Basketball	W	W	L	L	W	W	W	L	W	W	L	W	W																									
Armani Olimpia Milan	L	W	L	L	L	L	L	L	L	L	L	W	W																									
Fenerbahçe Tarfin	W	W	W	L	W	W	W	L	L	W	L	W	L																									
Hapoel IBI Tel Aviv	L	W	W	L	W	W	W	W	L	L	L	W	L																									
Kosner Baskonia	L	L	W	L	L	L	L	L	L	L	L	L	L																									
LDLC ASVEL	W	L	L	W	L	L	L	W	W	L	L	L	L																									
Maccabi Rapyd Tel Aviv	L	L	L	W	L	W	L	L	L	L	W	L	L																									
Olympiacos	W	W	L	W	W	W	L	W	W	L	W	W	W																									
Panathinaikos AKTOR	W	W	W	W	W	L	W	W	L	W	L	L	W																									
Paris Basketball	L	L	W	L	L	L	L	W	W	W	W	W	W																									
Partizan Mozzart Bet	W	W	W	L	L	L	W	L	L	W	W	L	W																									
Real Madrid	L	L	L	W	W	W	W	W	W	L	W	L	L																									
Valencia Basket	W	W	W	W	L	L	W	W	L	W	W	W	W																									
Virtus Bologna	L	L	W	W	W	W	L	L	L	L	L	W	L																									
Žalgiris	W	L	L	W	L	L	W	W	W	W	W	W	L																									

Updated to match(es) played on 20 November 2026. Source: EuroLeague

== Matches ==
Times are CET or CEST, (Note: CEST (UTC+2) for dates up to 25 October 2026 (rounds 1–7) and from 28 March 2027 (rounds 35–38), and CET (UTC+1) for dates between 25 October 2026 and 28 March 2027 (rounds 8–34).) as listed by Euroleague Basketball.

=== Round 1 ===
24 September 2026	Dubai Basketball (United Arab Emirates Basketball Association)	78–77	(Spanish Basketball Federation) Real Madrid	Dubai
18:00	Scoring by quarter: 20–16, 18–28, 25–18, 15–15
	Pts: Bacon 24; Rebs: Shengelia 8 Asts: Bacon, Okobo 4 PIR: Bacon 31	Boxscore	Pts: Luwawu-Cabarrot, Maledon 11; Rebs: Feliz, Jones 5 Asts: Maledon 6 PIR: Maledon 16	Arena: Coca-Cola Arena; Attendance: 7,269; Referees: Borys Ryzhyk, Kristaps Konstantinovs, Rain Peerandi

24 September 2026	Hapoel IBI Tel Aviv (Israeli Basketball Association)	84–86	(German Basketball Federation) Bayern Munich	Sofia
19:00	Scoring by quarter: 21–16, 18–28, 18–24, 27–18
	Pts: Oturu 20; Rebs: Oturu 12; Asts: three players 3 PIR: Oturu 32	Boxscore	Pts: Obst 19; Rebs: Thiemann 7 Asts: Jokubaitis 6 PIR: Thiemann 20	Arena: Arena Sofia; Referees: Emin Moğulkoç, Sergio Silva, Huseyin Celik

24 September 2026	Crvena zvezda Meridianbet (Basketball Federation of Serbia)	77–83	(Lithuanian Basketball Federation) Žalgiris	Belgrade
20:00	Scoring by quarter: 21–28, 24–15, 12–16, 20–24
	Pts: Jones 15; Rebs: Ojeleye 7 Asts: Jones 8 PIR: Jones 25	Boxscore	Pts: Williams-Goss 14; Rebs: Tubelis 12; Asts: Williams-Goss 6 PIR: Valančiūnas 24	Arena: Belgrade Arena; Attendance: 16,420; Referees: Carlos Peruga, Alberto Baena, Guido Giovannetti

24 September 2026	Panathinaikos AKTOR (Hellenic Basketball Federation)	91–72	(French Federation of Basketball) Paris Basketball	Marousi
20:15	Scoring by quarter: 31–17, 11–14, 27–13, 22–28
	Pts: Francisco 18; Rebs: Lessort 9 Asts: Francisco 4 PIR: Lessort 28	Boxscore	Pts: Etienne 17; Rebs: Dokossi, Tarpey 5 Asts: Tarpey 6 PIR: Dokossi 12	Arena: Telekom Center Athens; Attendance: 17,013; Referees: Emilio Pérez, Manuel Attard, Eduard Udyanskyy

24 September 2026	Barcelona (Spanish Basketball Federation)	89–82	(Turkish Basketball Federation) Anadolu Efes	Barcelona
20:30	Scoring by quarter: 16–25, 29–19, 18–23, 26–15
	Pts: Brizuela 20; Rebs: Gibson 6 Asts: Parra 3 PIR: Punter 22	Boxscore	Pts: James 22; Rebs: Jones, Šarić 5 Asts: James 5 PIR: Šarić 26	Arena: Palau Blaugrana; Attendance: 5,621; Referees: Saša Pukl, Maxime Boubert, Ioannis Tiganis

24 September 2026	Kosner Baskonia (Spanish Basketball Federation)	89–106	(Hellenic Basketball Federation) Olympiacos	Vitoria-Gasteiz
20:30	Scoring by quarter: 29–36, 17–20, 14–25, 29–25
	Pts: Lawson 20; Rebs: Duarte 5 Asts: Simmons 6 PIR: Lawson 17	Boxscore	Pts: Dorsey 25; Rebs: Jones 8 Asts: Miller-McIntyre 6 PIR: Vezenkov 30	Arena: Buesa Arena; Attendance: 6,848; Referees: Tomislav Hordov, Artūras Šukys, Miloš Koljenšić

24 September 2026	LDLC ASVEL (French Federation of Basketball)	84–74	(Israeli Basketball Association) Maccabi Rapyd Tel Aviv	Villeurbanne
20:45	Scoring by quarter: 19–19, 23–13, 20–25, '22–17
	Pts: Crowder 19; Rebs: Bolomboy 6 Asts: Fodzo Dada 5 PIR: Crowder 25	Boxscore	Pts: Hoard 15; Rebs: Brissett 7 Asts: Madar 8 PIR: Hoard 20	Arena: Astroballe; Attendance: 7,105; Referees: Milan Nedović, Michele Rossi, Robert Vyklický

25 September 2026	Beşiktaş (Turkish Basketball Federation)	94–96	(Spanish Basketball Federation) Valencia Basket	Istanbul
19:00	Scoring by quarter: 27–28, 24–26, 20–27, '23–15
	Pts: Nowell 17; Rebs: Žižić 7 Asts: Wilbekin 5 PIR: Omoruyi 15	Boxscore	Pts: Shorts 26; Rebs: Taylor 7 Asts: three players 3 PIR: Shorts 20	Arena: Basketball Development Center; Attendance: 5,103; Referees: Mehdi Difallah, Ioannis Foufis, Luka Kardum

25 September 2026	Fenerbahçe Tarfin (Turkish Basketball Federation)	78–68	(Italian Basketball Federation) Virtus Bologna	Istanbul
19:45	Scoring by quarter: 23–17, 16–21, 20–17, 19–13
	Pts: Horton-Tucker 13; Rebs: Key 10; Asts: Baldwin IV 6 PIR: Key 22	Boxscore	Pts: Carr 12; Rebs: Edwards, Moore Jr. 7 Asts: Carr 4 PIR: Edwards 12	Arena: Ülker Sports and Event Hall; Attendance: 8,850; Referees: Juan Carlos García, Milivoje Jovčić, Stefan Ćalić

25 September 2026	Partizan Mozzart Bet (Basketball Federation of Serbia)	92–76	(Italian Basketball Federation) Armani Olimpia Milan	Belgrade
20:45	Scoring by quarter: 20–16, 22–20, 21–22, 29–18
	Pts: Jones 20; Rebs: Tanasković 6 Asts: Jones 10; PIR: Jones 33	Boxscore	Pts: Gudurić, Peters 17; Rebs: Wright 7 Asts: Gudurić 5 PIR: Peters 21	Arena: Belgrade Arena; Attendance: 13,783; Referees: Robert Lottermoser, Jordi Aliaga, Thomas Bissuel

=== Round 2 ===
29 September 2026	Dubai Basketball (United Arab Emirates Basketball Association)	94–87	(Spanish Basketball Federation) Barcelona	Dubai
18:00	Scoring by quarter: 23–25, 29–12, 24–25, 18–25
	Pts: Kabengele 21; Rebs: Bacon 7 Asts: Okobo 6 PIR: Kabengele 24	Boxscore	Pts: Punter 25; Rebs: Martin, Punter 5 Asts: Robinson 5 PIR: Punter 28	Arena: Coca-Cola Arena; Attendance: 7,313; Referees: Oļegs Latiševs, Piotr Pastusiak, Gentian Cici

29 September 2026	Žalgiris (Lithuanian Basketball Federation)	91–93	(Hellenic Basketball Federation) Olympiacos	Kaunas
19:00	Scoring by quarter: 24–21, 20–23, 19–20, 28–29
	Pts: Brown 20; Rebs: Tubelis 7 Asts: Valančiūnas 7 PIR: Tubelis 22	Boxscore	Pts: Fournier 19; Rebs: Vezenkov 8 Asts: Montero 7 PIR: Vezenkov 26	Arena: Žalgirio Arena; Attendance: 15,267; Referees: Saša Pukl, Emilio Pérez, Luka Kardum

29 September 2026	Anadolu Efes (Turkish Basketball Federation)	94–84	(Spanish Basketball Federation) Real Madrid	Istanbul
19:00	Scoring by quarter: 27–29, 26–12, 19–24, 22–19
	Pts: Dozier 18; Rebs: Fernando, Loyd 4 Asts: three players 4 PIR: Dozier 18	Boxscore	Pts: Campazzo 16; Rebs: Tavares 7 Asts: Feliz, Maledon 5 PIR: Campazzo 16	Arena: Basketball Development Center; Attendance: 8,087; Referees: Milan Nedović, Saulius Račys, Vasiliki Tsaroucha

29 September 2026	Fenerbahçe Tarfin (Turkish Basketball Federation)	100–76	(German Basketball Federation) Bayern Munich	Istanbul
19:45	Scoring by quarter: 31–15, 19–16, 25–20, 25–25
	Pts: Horton-Tucker 19; Rebs: Horton-Tucker, Key 5 Asts: Baldwin 8 PIR: Horton-Tucker 25	Boxscore	Pts: Washington 20; Rebs: three players 5 Asts: Beauchamp, Jokubaitis 3 PIR: Washington 16	Arena: Ülker Sports and Event Hall; Attendance: 8,133; Referees: Tomislav Hordov, Sašo Petek, Maxime Boubert

29 September 2026	Crvena zvezda Meridianbet (Basketball Federation of Serbia)	80–81	(Israeli Basketball Association) Hapoel IBI Tel Aviv	Belgrade
20:00	Scoring by quarter: 18–28, 17–17, 24–22, 21–14
	Pts: Butler 19; Rebs: Izundu 9 Asts: Weiler-Babb 6 PIR: Butler 17	Boxscore	Pts: Bryant 18; Rebs: Bryant 10; Asts: Bryant, Micić 4 PIR: Bryant 31	Arena: Belgrade Arena; Attendance: 14,247; Referees: Juan Carlos Garcia, Mehdi Difallah, Joseph Bissang

29 September 2026	Armani Olimpia Milan (Italian Basketball Federation)	87–85	(Italian Basketball Federation) Virtus Bologna	Assago
20:30	Scoring by quarter: 30–20, 17–21, 19–26, 21–18
	Pts: Gudurić 14; Rebs: Burnell 10; Asts: Cole 3 PIR: Wright 16	Boxscore	Pts: Diarra 15; Rebs: Diarra 7 Asts: Carr 9 PIR: Diarra 22	Arena: Unipol Forum; Attendance: 6,950; Referees: Borys Ryzhyk, Alberto Baena, Igor Dragojević

29 September 2026	Valencia Basket (Spanish Basketball Federation)	111–88	(Spanish Basketball Federation) Baskonia	Valencia
20:30	Scoring by quarter: 26–10, 26–23, 31–27, 28–28
	Pts: Brooks 17; Rebs: Osetkowski 7 Asts: Shorts 10; PIR: Osetkowski, Shorts 20	Boxscore	Pts: Sedekerskis 16; Rebs: Kurucs 8 Asts: Spagnolo 5 PIR: Faried 20	Arena: Roig Arena; Attendance: 12,156; Referees: Ilija Belošević, Robert Lottermoser, Seffi Shemmesh

29 September 2026	Paris Basketball (French Federation of Basketball)	79–92	(Basketball Federation of Serbia) Partizan Mozzart Bet	Paris
20:45	Scoring by quarter: 18–15, 22–29, 23–23, 16–25
	Pts: Hifi 19; Rebs: Rhoden 9 Asts: Dokossi, Hifi 4 PIR: Rhoden 16	Boxscore	Pts: Jones 20; Rebs: Jekiri 7 Asts: Jones, Pajola 5 PIR: Jones 26	Arena: Adidas Arena; Attendance: 5,680; Referees: Carlos Peruga, Ioannis Foufis, Sergio Manuel

30 September 2026	Maccabi Rapyd Tel Aviv (Israeli Basketball Association)	93–109	(Turkish Basketball Federation) Beşiktaş	Belgrade
20:05	Scoring by quarter: 19–27, 27–25, 17–26, 30–31
	Pts: Colson 17; Rebs: Lundberg 4 Asts: Madar 6 PIR: Clark 19	Boxscore	Pts: Brown, Wilbekin 20; Rebs: Brown 5 Asts: Dotson, Nowell 4 PIR: Brown, Dotson 24	Arena: Aleksandar Nikolić Hall; Attendance: 427; Referees: Carlos Cortés, Eduard Udyanskyy, Ioannis Tiganis

30 September 2026	Panathinaikos AKTOR (Hellenic Basketball Federation)	102–79	(French Federation of Basketball) LDLC ASVEL	Marousi
20:15	Scoring by quarter: 25–13, 31–21, 24–22, 22–23
	Pts: Francisco 19; Rebs: Lessort 8 Asts: Kalaitzakis 5 PIR: Francisco 25	Boxscore	Pts: Sestina 14; Rebs: three players 5 Asts: three players 3 PIR: Sestina 13	Arena: Telekom Center Athens; Attendance: 15,733; Referees: Damir Javor, Milivoje Jovčić, Jordi Aliaga

=== Round 3 ===
1 October 2026	Hapoel IBI Tel Aviv (Israeli Basketball Association)	102–98	(Spanish Basketball Federation) Real Madrid	Sofia
18:00	Scoring by quarter: 29–20, 34–23, 12–32, 27–23
	Pts: Bryant, Micić 22; Rebs: Bryant 13; Asts: Bryant 7 PIR: Bryant 40	Boxscore	Pts: Maledon 26; Rebs: Tavares 13; Asts: Campazzo, Maledon 7 PIR: Maledon 40	Arena: Arena Sofia; Referees: Saša Pukl, Sašo Petek, Guido Giovannetti

1 October 2026	Crvena zvezda Meridianbet (Basketball Federation of Serbia)	77–72	(Turkish Basketball Federation) Anadolu Efes	Belgrade
20:00	Scoring by quarter: 19–21, 18–15, 19–17, 21–19
	Pts: Moneke 18; Rebs: Dobrić, Moneke 7 Asts: Jones 4 PIR: Moneke 17	Boxscore	Pts: Šarić, Strazel 13; Rebs: Šarić 10; Asts: Malcolm 4 PIR: Loyd 28	Arena: Belgrade Arena; Attendance: 14,081; Referees: Gytis Vilius, Steve Bittner, Sergio Manuel

1 October 2026	Virtus Bologna (Italian Basketball Federation)	96–94	(Hellenic Basketball Federation) Olympiacos	Bologna
20:30	Scoring by quarter: 33–30, 16–20, 26–20, 21–24
	Pts: Carr 22; Rebs: Diarra 14; Asts: Carr 10; PIR: Carr, Diarra 30	Boxscore	Pts: Ndiaye 23; Rebs: Fournier, Ndiaye 7 Asts: Miller-McIntyre 8 PIR: Ndiaye 29	Arena: PalaDozza; Referees: Carlos Peruga, Ilija Belošević, Denis Hadžić

1 October 2026	Paris Basketball (French Federation of Basketball)	82–78	(Lithuanian Basketball Federation) Žalgiris	Paris
20:45	Scoring by quarter: 17–19, 24–19, 20–15, 21–25
	Pts: Hifi 21; Rebs: Dokossi 8 Asts: Herrera, Rhoden 4 PIR: Dokossi 17	Boxscore	Pts: Tubelis 18; Rebs: Tubelis 7 Asts: Brown, Lô 4 PIR: Tubelis 25	Arena: Adidas Arena; Attendance: 3,746; Referees: Tomislav Hordov, Tomasz Trawicki, Uroš Obrknežević

2 October 2026	Beşiktaş (Turkish Basketball Federation)	82–95	(Spanish Basketball Federation) Barcelona	Istanbul
19:00	Scoring by quarter: 17–25, 23–27, 22–25, 20–18
	Pts: Wilbekin 17; Rebs: Žižić 9 Asts: Morgan 5 PIR: Žižić 18	Boxscore	Pts: Punter 16; Rebs: Martin 5 Asts: Punter 4 PIR: Gibson 20	Arena: Basketball Development Center; Attendance: 8,500; Referees: Borys Ryzhyk, Michele Rossi, Anne Panther

2 October 2026	Fenerbahçe Tarfin (Turkish Basketball Federation)	76–66	(United Arab Emirates Basketball Association) Dubai Basketball	Istanbul
19:45	Scoring by quarter: 26–14, 16–25, 13–12, 21–15
	Pts: Bingham 20; Rebs: Bingham, Key 8 Asts: Baldwin IV 5 PIR: Bingham 25	Boxscore	Pts: Okobo 18; Rebs: Kabengele 12; Asts: Okobo 4 PIR: Kabengele 13	Arena: Ülker Sports and Event Hall; Attendance: 8,497; Referees: Emilio Pérez, Robert Lottermoser, Jordi Aliaga

2 October 2026	Bayern Munich (German Basketball Federation)	84–86	(Basketball Federation of Serbia) Partizan Mozzart Bet	Munich
20:00	Scoring by quarter: 27–22, 20–24, 18–11, 19–29
	Pts: Washington 20; Rebs: Wiley 10; Asts: Washington 4 PIR: Thiemann 25	Boxscore	Pts: Jekiri 17; Rebs: Jekiri 5 Asts: Pajola 7 PIR: Jekiri 21	Arena: SAP Garden; Attendance: 11,500; Referees: Mehdi Difallah, Joseph Bissang, Vassilis Pitsilkas

2 October 2026	LDLC ASVEL (French Federation of Basketball)	92–105	(Spanish Basketball Federation) Valencia Basket	Décines-Charpieu
20:00	Scoring by quarter: 33–21, 28–29, 16–26, 15–29
	Pts: Mills 26; Rebs: Crowder 7 Asts: Besson 6 PIR: Mills 25	Boxscore	Pts: Mirotić 22; Rebs: Sako 8 Asts: Shorts 6 PIR: Mirotić 24	Arena: LDLC Arena; Attendance: 8,125; Referees: Oļegs Latiševs, Josip Radojković, Franko Gracin

2 October 2026	Panathinaikos AKTOR (Hellenic Basketball Federation)	90–67	(Israeli Basketball Association) Maccabi Rapyd Tel Aviv	Marousi
20:15	Scoring by quarter: 25–10, 18–14, 25–19, 22–24
	Pts: Yabusele 17; Rebs: Mitoglou 8 Asts: three players 4 PIR: Hayes-Davis 18	Boxscore	Pts: Sorkin 13; Rebs: Colson, Leaf 8 Asts: Wallace 5 PIR: Sorkin 16	Arena: Telekom Center Athens; Attendance: 17,003; Referees: Juan Carlos García, Alberto Baena, Huseyin Çelik

2 October 2026	Baskonia (Spanish Basketball Federation)	86–76	(Italian Basketball Federation) Armani Olimpia Milan	Vitoria-Gasteiz
20:30	Scoring by quarter: 26–16, 18–20, 21–24, 21–16
	Pts: Lawson 16; Rebs: Faried, Santos 6 Asts: three players 4 PIR: Duarte 17	Boxscore	Pts: Wright 17; Rebs: Peters 7 Asts: Hall 12; PIR: Wright 19	Arena: Buesa Arena; Attendance: 7,283; Referees: Emin Moğulkoç, Milivoje Jovčić, Stefan Ćalić

=== Round 4 ===
7 October 2026	Paris Basketball (French Federation of Basketball)	96–98	(French Federation of Basketball) LDLC ASVEL	Paris
20:45	Scoring by quarter: 21–14, 22–32, 34–28, 19–24
	Pts: Hifi 30; Rebs: Dokossi 9 Asts: three players 3 PIR: Hifi 22	Boxscore	Pts: Mills 21; Rebs: Besson 6 Asts: Gach 6 PIR: Gach, Waters 25	Arena: Adidas Arena; Attendance: 6,628; Referees: Borys Ryzhyk, Saulius Račys, Vasiliki Tsaroucha

8 October 2026	Dubai Basketball (United Arab Emirates Basketball Association)	58–77	(Basketball Federation of Serbia) Crvena zvezda Meridianbet	Dubai
18:00	Scoring by quarter: 21–16, 10–21, 15–19, 12–21
	Pts: Bacon 13; Rebs: Diakite 8 Asts: Bacon 4 PIR: Shengelia 18	Boxscore	Pts: Nwora 20; Rebs: Ojeleye 7 Asts: Weiler-Babb 6 PIR: Nwora 20	Arena: Coca-Cola Arena; Attendance: 5,270; Referees: Saša Pukl, Manuel Attard, Arnau Padrós

8 October 2026	Maccabi Rapyd Tel Aviv (Israeli Basketball Association)	97–79	(Italian Basketball Federation) Armani Olimpia Milan	Belgrade
18:00	Scoring by quarter: 24–20, 27–25, 23–17, 23–17
	Pts: Madar 17; Rebs: Colson, Hoard 4 Asts: four players 4 PIR: Madar 22	Boxscore	Pts: Wright 23; Rebs: Wright 8 Asts: Hall 9 PIR: Wright 32	Arena: Aleksandar Nikolić Hall; Attendance: 254; Referees: Oļegs Latiševs, Ioannis Foufis, Anne Panther

8 October 2026	Bayern Munich (German Basketball Federation)	87–94	(Italian Basketball Federation) Virtus Bologna	Munich
20:00	Scoring by quarter: 21–35, 22–17, 25–23, 19–19
	Pts: Da Silva, Washington 18; Rebs: Beauchamp 9 Asts: Washington 5 PIR: Beauchamp 21	Boxscore	Pts: Moore 20; Rebs: Moore 9 Asts: Baldasso, Carr 3 PIR: Moore 28	Arena: SAP Garden; Attendance: 10,374; Referees: Gytis Vilius, Tomasz Trawicki, Rain Peerandi

8 October 2026	Panathinaikos AKTOR (Hellenic Basketball Federation)	92–74	(Turkish Basketball Federation) Fenerbahçe Tarfin	Marousi
20:15	Scoring by quarter: 27–24, 19–17, 21–14, 25–19
	Pts: Hayes-Davis, Lessort 19; Rebs: Lessort 8 Asts: Francisco 7 PIR: Lessort 30	Boxscore	Pts: Key 13; Rebs: Key 7 Asts: Baldwin IV 5 PIR: Key 15	Arena: Telekom Center Athens; Attendance: 18,768; Referees: Ilija Belošević, Carlos Peruga, Artūras Šukys

8 October 2026	Valencia Basket (Spanish Basketball Federation)	93–82	(Israeli Basketball Association) Hapoel IBI Tel Aviv	Valencia
20:30	Scoring by quarter: 29–17, 18–23, 27–17, 19–25
	Pts: Taylor 17; Rebs: Sako 6 Asts: Shorts 7 PIR: Taylor 19	Boxscore	Pts: Blakeney 30; Rebs: Bryant 9 Asts: Satoranský 9 PIR: Blakeney 29	Arena: Roig Arena; Referees: Tomislav Hordov, Jakub Zamojski, Maxime Boubert

8 October 2026	Real Madrid (Spanish Basketball Federation)	86–76	(Basketball Federation of Serbia) Partizan Mozzart Bet	Madrid
20:45	Scoring by quarter: 27–19, 26–18, 18–20, 15–19
	Pts: Maledon 13; Rebs: Tavares 8 Asts: Maledon 4 PIR: Tavares 14	Boxscore	Pts: Jones 19; Rebs: Thompson 8 Asts: Jones, Pajola 5 PIR: Jones 27	Arena: Movistar Arena; Attendance: 8,579; Referees: Emin Moğulkoç, Miloš Koljenšić, Marcin Kowalski

9 October 2026	Olympiacos (Hellenic Basketball Federation)	89–66	(Turkish Basketball Federation) Anadolu Efes	Ano Liosia
20:15	Scoring by quarter: 26–16, 9–15, 27–18, 27–17
	Pts: Montero 16; Rebs: Milutinov 9 Asts: Fournier 6 PIR: Montero 21	Boxscore	Pts: Payne 12; Rebs: Šarić, Yusta 4 Asts: Russell 4 PIR: Loyd 14	Arena: SUNEL Arena; Attendance: 5,935; Referees: Robert Lottermoser, Michele Rossi, Gentian Cici

9 October 2026	Barcelona (Spanish Basketball Federation)	81–88	(Lithuanian Basketball Federation) Žalgiris	Barcelona
20:30	Scoring by quarter: 18–23, 23–16, 24–16, 16–33
	Pts: Robinson 20; Rebs: Nebo 6 Asts: Gibson 3 PIR: Robinson 21	Boxscore	Pts: Edwards 19; Rebs: Valančiūnas 9 Asts: Edwards 7 PIR: Edwards 21	Arena: Palau Blaugrana; Attendance: 4,346; Referees: Milan Nedović, Sašo Petek, Hugues Thépénier

9 October 2026	Baskonia (Spanish Basketball Federation)	84–92	(Turkish Basketball Federation) Beşiktaş	Vitoria-Gasteiz
20:30	Scoring by quarter: 20–28, 31–21, 20–24, 13–19
	Pts: Duarte 23; Rebs: Faried 10; Asts: Kurucs, Simmons 5 PIR: Duarte 31	Boxscore	Pts: Wilbekin 24; Rebs: three players 5 Asts: Dotson 6 PIR: Dotson 20	Arena: Buesa Arena; Attendance: 7,351; Referees: Damir Javor, Thomas Bissuel, Sérgio Silva

=== Round 5 ===
13 October 2026	Fenerbahçe Tarfin (Turkish Basketball Federation)	99–80	(Lithuanian Basketball Federation) Žalgiris	Istanbul
19:45	Scoring by quarter: 27–14, 23–29, 28–13, 21–24
	Pts: Shields 17; Rebs: Melli, Şanlı 4 Asts: Baldwin IV 7 PIR: Shields 19	Boxscore	Pts: Edwards 20; Rebs: Valančiūnas 10; Asts: Lee 4 PIR: Edwards 18	Arena: Ülker Sports and Event Hall; Attendance: 7,214; Referees: Juan Carlos Garcia, Milos Koljensic, Anne Panther

13 October 2026	LDLC ASVEL (French Federation of Basketball)	82–84	(Basketball Federation of Serbia) Crvena zvezda Meridianbet	Villeurbanne
20:00	Scoring by quarter: 23–26, 23–16, 21–24, 15–18
	Pts: Gach 19; Rebs: Massa 6 Asts: Crowder 4 PIR: Gach 18	Boxscore	Pts: Moneke 18; Rebs: Ojeleye 6 Asts: Jones 9 PIR: Ojeleye 18	Arena: Astroballe; Attendance: 5,282; Referees: Carlos Cortés, Sergio Silva, Christian Theis

13 October 2026	Partizan Mozzart Bet (Basketball Federation of Serbia)	55–72	(Hellenic Basketball Federation) Panathianikos AKTOR	Belgrade
20:30	Scoring by quarter: 16–16, 12–19, 8–20, 19–17
	Pts: Hayes 10; Rebs: Jekiri 7 Asts: Thompson, Vildoza 4 PIR: Hayes 17	Boxscore	Pts: Hayes-Davis 14; Rebs: Lessort 9 Asts: Francisco 5 PIR: Fall, Lessort 15	Arena: Belgrade Arena; Attendance: 20,073; Referees: Emilio Pérez, Manuel Attard, Gentian Cici

13 October 2026	Barcelona (Spanish Basketball Federation)	90–87	(Israeli Basketball Association) Maccabi Rapyd Tel Aviv	Barcelona
20:30	Scoring by quarter: 23–24, 17–18, 27–22, 23–23
	Pts: Punter 19; Rebs: Martin 7 Asts: Brizuela 4 PIR: Punter 21	Boxscore	Pts: Madar 22; Rebs: Theis 5 Asts: Madar, Wallace 4 PIR: Madar 31	Arena: Palau Blaugrana; Attendance: 3,637; Referees: Gytis Vilius, Josip Radojković, Kerem Baki

13 October 2026	Armani Olimpia Milan (Italian Basketball Federation)	89–98	(Spanish Basketball Federation) Real Madrid	Assago
20:30	Scoring by quarter: 25–21, 15–32, 27–31, 22–14
	Pts: Bolmaro 21; Rebs: Booker 6 Asts: Bolmaro 5 PIR: Bolmaro, Hall 16	Boxscore	Pts: Maledon 16; Rebs: Tavares 6 Asts: Campazzo 6 PIR: Feliz 24	Arena: Unipol Forum; Attendance: 6,604; Referees: Ilija Belošević, Tomasz Trawicki, Hugues Thepenier

13 October 2026	Baskonia (Spanish Basketball Federation)	79–93	(United Arab Emirates Basketball Association) Dubai Basketball	Vitoria-Gasteiz
20:30	Scoring by quarter: 23–25, 20–19, 19–26, 17–23
	Pts: Sedekerskis 13; Rebs: Duarte 7 Asts: Duarte 4 PIR: Sedekerskis 18	Boxscore	Pts: Petrušev 17; Rebs: Kabengele 10; Asts: Bacon, Wright IV 5 PIR: Kabengele 23	Arena: Buesa Arena; Attendance: 6,290; Referees: Borys Ryzhyk, Kristaps Konstantinovs, Jakub Zamojski

13 October 2026	Valencia Basket (Spanish Basketball Federation)	97–102(OT)	(Hellenic Basketball Federation) Olympiacos	Valencia
21:00	Scoring by quarter: 31–17, 28–17, 12–25, 19–31, Overtime: 7–12
	Pts: Mirotić 19; Rebs: three players 4 Asts: Shorts 5 PIR: Mirotić 19	Boxscore	Pts: Montero 26; Rebs: three players 7 Asts: Fournier, Ward 4 PIR: Montero 35	Arena: Roig Arena; Attendance: 13,054; Referees: Mehdi Difallah, Marcin Kowalski, Saulius Račys

14 October 2026	Hapoel IBI Tel Aviv (Israeli Basketball Association)	100–82	(Turkish Basketball Federation) Beşiktaş	Sofia
18:00	Scoring by quarter: 22–18, 21–21, 32–16, 25–27
	Pts: Bryant, Micić 16; Rebs: Coffey 7 Asts: Micić, Satoranský 3 PIR: LeDay 22	Boxscore	Pts: Žižić 17; Rebs: Žižić 9 Asts: Dotson 6 PIR: Žižić 28	Arena: Arena Sofia; Attendance: 218; Referees: Milan Nedović, Jordi Aliaga, Piotr Pastusiak

14 October 2026	Anadolu Efes (Turkish Basketball Federation)	93–101	(German Basketball Federation) Bayern Munich	Istanbul
19:30	Scoring by quarter: 22–26, 24–28, 22–21, 25–26
	Pts: Šarić 21; Rebs: Fernando 12; Asts: Strazel 7 PIR: Šarić 28	Boxscore	Pts: Washington 21; Rebs: Norris 6 Asts: Obst 6 PIR: Obst 20	Arena: Basketball Development Center; Attendance: 3,603; Referees: Oļegs Latiševs, Artūras Šukys, Luka Kardum

14 October 2026	Paris Basketball (French Federation of Basketball)	94– 96	(Italian Basketball Federation) Virtus Bologna	Paris
20:45	Scoring by quarter: 26–26, 12–20, 27–18, 29–32
	Pts: Etienne 23; Rebs: Faye 7 Asts: Etienne 7 PIR: Etienne 27	Boxscore	Pts: Alston Jr. 23; Rebs: Diarra 11; Asts: Carr 6 PIR: Alston Jr. 22	Arena: Adidas Arena; Attendance: 5,343; Referees: Emin Moğulkoç, Damir Javor, Igor Dragojević

=== Round 6 ===
15 October 2026	Fenerbahçe Tarfin (Turkish Basketball Federation)	74–65	(Basketball Federation of Serbia) Partizan Mozzart Bet	Istanbul
19:45	Scoring by quarter: 12–19, 13–9, 34–16, 15–21
	Pts: Shields 17; Rebs: Bingham 9 Asts: Horton-Tucker 5 PIR: Shields 25	Boxscore	Pts: Thompson 13; Rebs: six players 4 Asts: Jones 8 PIR: Hayes 10	Arena: Ülker Sports and Event Hall; Attendance: 8,176; Referees: Mehdi Difallah, Alberto Baena, Arnau Padrós

15 October 2026	Valencia Basket (Spanish Basketball Federation)	88–91	(Israeli Basketball Association) Maccabi Rapyd Tel Aviv	Valencia
20:30	Scoring by quarter: 23–31, 25–19, 24–21, 16–20
	Pts: Brooks, Corbalán 14; Rebs: Osetkowski 5 Asts: Cárdenas, Shorts 4 PIR: Corbalán 21	Boxscore	Pts: Clark 17; Rebs: Brissett, Colson 5 Asts: Theis 5 PIR: Brissett 21	Arena: Roig Arena; Attendance: 10,361; Referees: Saša Pukl, Sašo Petek, Vasiliki Tsaroucha

15 October 2026	Armani Olimpia Milan (Italian Basketball Federation)	97–101	(United Arab Emirates Basketball Association) Dubai Basketball	Assago
20:30	Scoring by quarter: 23–29, 26–27, 19–27, 29–18
	Pts: Mathews 21; Rebs: Peters 8 Asts: Cole 6 PIR: Mathews 27	Boxscore	Pts: Bacon 29; Rebs: Blossomgame 6 Asts: Okobo 5 PIR: Bacon 27	Arena: Unipol Forum; Attendance: 5,891; Referees: Carlos Peruga, Gytis Vilius, Saulius Račys

15 October 2026	Real Madrid (Spanish Basketball Federation)	111–92	(French Federation of Basketball) LDLC ASVEL	Madrid
21:00	Scoring by quarter: 27–25, 34–23, 16–23, 34–21
	Pts: Feliz 26; Rebs: three players 5 Asts: Maledon 9 PIR: Feliz 30	Boxscore	Pts: Washington 17; Rebs: Bolomboy 7 Asts: Jackson, Washington 6 PIR: Washington 24	Arena: Movistar Arena; Attendance: 6,723; Referees: Milivoje Jovčić, Seffi Shemmesh, Eduard Udyanskyy

16 October 2026	Žalgiris (Lithuanian Basketball Federation)	70–85	(Turkish Basketball Federation) Anadolu Efes	Kaunas
19:00	Scoring by quarter: 12–21, 24–21, 20–25, 14–18
	Pts: Edwards 16; Rebs: Valančiūnas 7 Asts: Lee 5 PIR: Valančiūnas 15	Boxscore	Pts: Strazel 19; Rebs: Šarić 10; Asts: Loyd 6 PIR: Strazel 22	Arena: Žalgirio Arena; Attendance: 15,133; Referees: Damir Javor, Thomas Bissuel, Steve Bittner

16 October 2026	Beşiktaş (Turkish Basketball Federation)	95–87	(German Basketball Federation) Bayern Munich	Istanbul
19:00	Scoring by quarter: 26–17, 27–18, 16–23, 26–29
	Pts: Nowell 21; Rebs: Morgan 6 Asts: Wilbekin 5 PIR: Nowell 23	Boxscore	Pts: Lučić 17; Rebs: Lučić, Wiley 7 Asts: Obst 4 PIR: Lučić 28	Arena: Basketball Development Center; Attendance: 5,206; Referees: Carlos Cortés, Jakub Zamojski, Dragan Porobić

16 October 2026	Crvena zvezda Meridianbet (Basketball Federation of Serbia)	90–81	(French Federation of Basketball) Paris Basketball	Belgrade
20:00	Scoring by quarter: 28–18, 18–18, 31–22, 13–23
	Pts: Moneke 23; Rebs: Nwora 6 Asts: Jones 7 PIR: Moneke 31	Boxscore	Pts: Etienne 24; Rebs: Dokossi, Johnson 6 Asts: Etienne 7 PIR: Etienne 22	Arena: Belgrade Arena; Attendance: 16,124; Referees: Robert Lottermoser, Marcin Kowalski, Piotr Pastusiak

16 October 2026	Panathinaikos AKTOR (Hellenic Basketball Federation)	81–91	(Israeli Basketball Association) Hapoel IBI Tel Aviv	Marousi
20:15	Scoring by quarter: 25–29, 21–19, 15–20, 20–23
	Pts: Francisco 22; Rebs: Hernangómez 5 Asts: Francisco, Grant 4 PIR: Francisco 27	Boxscore	Pts: Leday 17; Rebs: Bryant 6 Asts: Micić 8 PIR: Bryant 22	Arena: Telekom Center Athens; Attendance: 17,015; Referees: Emin Moğulkoç, Kristaps Konstantinovs, Hugues Thépénier

16 October 2026	Virtus Bologna (Italian Basketball Federation)	86–78	(Spanish Basketball Federation) Baskonia	Bologna
20:30	Scoring by quarter: 24–12, 22–22, 22–19, 18–25
	Pts: Carr 20; Rebs: Diouf, Bobi Klintman 6 Asts: Frazier 4 PIR: Carr 18	Boxscore	Pts: Lawson 13; Rebs: Sedkerskis 10; Asts: Baugh 8 PIR: Sedekerskis 16	Arena: PalaDozza; Attendance: 5,471; Referees: Milan Nedović, Joseph Bissang, Uroš Obrknežević

16 October 2026	Barcelona (Spanish Basketball Federation)	100–105(OT)	(Hellenic Basketball Federation) Olympiacos	Barcelona
20:30	Scoring by quarter: 30–26, 17–31, 19–20, 26–15, Overtime: 8–13
	Pts: Martin, Robinson 17; Rebs: Nebo 10; Asts: Gibson 7 PIR: Nebo, Robinson 22	Boxscore	Pts: Vezenkov 25; Rebs: Jones, Ndiaye 7 Asts: Montero 7 PIR: Vezenkov 38	Arena: Palau Blaugrana; Attendance: 5,394; Referees: Tomislav Hordov, Artūras Šukys, Miloš Koljenšić

=== Round 7 ===
21 October 2026	Hapoel IBI Tel Aviv (Israeli Basketball Association)	90–81	(Italian Basketball Federation) Virtus Bologna	Sofia
18:00	Scoring by quarter: 23–25, 13–23, 28–14, 26–19
	Pts: LeDay 22; Rebs: LeDay 10; Asts: LeDay 4 PIR: LeDay 33	Boxscore	Pts: Alston Jr., Diarra 12; Rebs: Diarra, Kokila 7 Asts: Bello, Carr 3 PIR: Diarra 22	Arena: Arena Sofia; Attendance: 432; Referees: Carlos Cortés, Alberto Baena, Luka Kardum

22 October 2026	Anadolu Efes (Turkish Basketball Federation)	89–80	(Turkish Basketball Federation) Beşiktaş	Istanbul
19:30	Scoring by quarter: 29–17, 28–19, 11–24, 21–20
	Pts: Payne 22; Rebs: Loyd 8 Asts: Strazel 6 PIR: Payne 19	Boxscore	Pts: Omoruyi 16; Rebs: Omoruyi 6 Asts: Wilbekin 5 PIR: Omoruyi 17	Arena: Basketball Development Center; Attendance: 4,325; Referees: Mehdi Difallah, Tomislav Hordov, Milivoje Jovčić

22 October 2026	Bayern Munich (German Basketball Federation)	91–107	(United Arab Emirates Basketball Association) Dubai Basketball	Munich
20:00	Scoring by quarter: 14–29, 22–34, 31–19, 24–25
	Pts: Washington 17; Rebs: Voigtmann 6 Asts: Voigtmann 5 PIR: Da Silva 18	Boxscore	Pts: Kabengele 24; Rebs: Kabengele 7 Asts: Okobo 9 PIR: Kabengele 29	Arena: SAP Garden; Attendance: 9,154; Referees: Emin Moğulkoç, Jordi Aliaga, Guido Giovannetti

22 October 2026	Maccabi Rapyd Tel Aviv (Israeli Basketball Association)	99–113	(Spanish Basketball Federation) Real Madrid	Belgrade
20:05	Scoring by quarter: 30–23, 22–28, 21–30, 26–32
	Pts: Clark 20; Rebs: Theis 6 Asts: Madar 5 PIR: Colson 22	Boxscore	Pts: Campazzo 21; Rebs: Tavares 7 Asts: Campazzo 5 PIR: Campazzo 28	Arena: Aleksandar Nikolić Hall; Attendance: 102; Referees: Milan Nedović, Saulius Račys, Rain Peerandi

22 October 2026	Panathinaikos AKTOR (Hellenic Basketball Federation)	85–79	(Spanish Basketball Federation) Baskonia	Marousi
20:15	Scoring by quarter: 20–21, 23–19, 20–14, 22–25
	Pts: Lessort 20; Rebs: Badio, Hayes-Davis 7 Asts: Francisco 11; PIR: Lessort 28	Boxscore	Pts: Spagnolo 16; Rebs: Kurucs 6 Asts: Baugh 7 PIR: Spagnolo 18	Arena: Telekom Center Athens; Attendance: 14,633; Referees: Robert Lottermoser, Marcin Kowalski, Sašo Petek

22 October 2026	Armani Olimpia Milan (Italian Basketball Federation)	81–89	(Spanish Basketball Federation) Barcelona	Assago
20:30	Scoring by quarter: 21–23, 19–21, 24–27, 17–18
	Pts: Burnell 15; Rebs: Wright 8 Asts: Cole 5 PIR: Bolmaro, Thompson 15	Boxscore	Pts: Punter 17; Rebs: Martin 7 Asts: Robinson 8 PIR: Gibson 21	Arena: Unipol Forum; Attendance: 6,657; Referees: Saša Pukl, Damir Javor, Jakub Zamojski

22 October 2026	Partizan Mozzart Bet (Basketball Federation of Serbia)	85–82(OT)	(Basketball Federation of Serbia) Crvena zvezda Meridianbet	Belgrade
20:45	Scoring by quarter: 31–21, 21–17, 13–12, 10–25, Overtime: 10–7
	Pts: Ca. Jones 26; Rebs: Hayes 8 Asts: Jones 5 PIR: Jones 28	Boxscore	Pts: Ch. Jones 22; Rebs: Nwora 8 Asts: Ch. Jones 4 PIR: Ch. Jones 23	Arena: Belgrade Arena; Attendance: 19,102; Referees: Carlos Peruga, Borys Ryzhyk, Thomas Bissuel

23 October 2026	Žalgiris (Lithuanian Basketball Federation)	105–85	(French Federation of Basketball) LDLC ASVEL	Kaunas
19:00	Scoring by quarter: 29–20, 21–14, 31–25, 24–26
	Pts: Edwards 16; Rebs: Valančiūnas 8 Asts: Lee 7 PIR: Valančiūnas 18	Boxscore	Pts: Besson 13; Rebs: Crowder 6 Asts: Washington 4 PIR: Crowder 16	Arena: Žalgirio Arena; Attendance: 14,834; Referees: Oļegs Latiševs, Kristaps Konstantinovs, Manuel Attard

23 October 2026	Olympiacos (Hellenic Basketball Federation)	61–64	(Turkish Basketball Federation) Fenerbahçe Tarfin	Ano Liosia
20:15	Scoring by quarter: 20–8, 14–16, 15–21, 12–19
	Pts: Vezenkov 17; Rebs: Milutinov 13; Asts: Miller-McIntyre 6 PIR: Vezenkov 20	Boxscore	Pts: Shields 17; Rebs: Shields 7 Asts: Baldwin IV, Larkin 5 PIR: Shields 25	Arena: SUNEL Arena; Attendance: 7,214; Referees: Ilija Belošević, Emilio Pérez, Eduard Udyanskyy

23 October 2026	Paris Basketball (French Federation of Basketball)	93–104	(Spanish Basketball Federation) Valencia Basket	Paris
20:45	Scoring by quarter: 26–32, 28–25, 16–26, 23–21
	Pts: Rhoden 20; Rebs: Dokossi 7 Asts: Ayayi 5 PIR: Rhoden 18	Boxscore	Pts: Shorts 25; Rebs: Brooks, Sako 7 Asts: Shorts 9 PIR: Shorts 33	Arena: Adidas Arena; Attendance: 8,042; Referees: Gytis Vilius, Miloš Koljenšić, Artūras Šukys

=== Round 8 ===
27 October 2026	Dubai Basketball (United Arab Emirates Basketball Association)	93–99	(French Federation of Basketball) Paris Basketball	Dubai
17:00	Scoring by quarter: 25–23, 22–31, 25–19, 21–26
	Pts: Bacon 24; Rebs: Kabengele 13; Asts: Wright IV 6 PIR: Bacon 27	Boxscore	Pts: Hifi, Rhoden 20; Rebs: Faye 5 Asts: four players 3 PIR: Rhoden 22	Arena: Coca-Cola Arena; Attendance: 5,900; Referees: Emilio Pérez, Alberto Baena, Stefan Ćalić

27 October 2026	Bayern Munich (German Basketball Federation)	84–88	(Spanish Basketball Federation) Barcelona	Munich
20:00	Scoring by quarter: 17–21, 25–20, 19–23, 23–24
	Pts: Jokubaitis, Norris 17; Rebs: Wiley 8 Asts: Jokubaitis 7 PIR: Jokubaitis 20	Boxscore	Pts: Punter 23; Rebs: Nebo 9 Asts: Robinson 5 PIR: Punter 23	Arena: SAP Garden; Attendance: 11,124; Referees: Milan Nedović, Tomasz Trawicki, Thomas Bissuel

27 October 2026	Crvena zvezda Meridianbet (Basketball Federation of Serbia)	100–78	(Israeli Basketball Association) Maccabi Rapyd Tel Aviv	Belgrade
20:00	Scoring by quarter: 34–15, 21–15, 23–25, 22–23
	Pts: Carter 24; Rebs: three players 5 Asts: Jones 9 PIR: Carter 26	Boxscore	Pts: Clark III 19; Rebs: Brissett 7 Asts: five players 3 PIR: three players 12	Arena: Belgrade Arena; Attendance: 11,765; Referees: Emin Moğulkoç, Kristaps Konstantinovs, Gentian Cici

27 October 2026	Panathinaikos AKTOR (Hellenic Basketball Federation)	80–75	(Italian Basketball Federation) Armani Olimpia Milan	Marousi
20:15	Scoring by quarter: 18–19, 22–18, 20–24, 20–14
	Pts: Nunn 20; Rebs: Lessort 11; Asts: Nunn 6 PIR: Nunn 26	Boxscore	Pts: Hall 15; Rebs: Diop 6 Asts: Cole 4 PIR: Hall 13	Arena: Telekom Center Athens; Attendance: 17,088; Referees: Carlos Cortés, Artūras Šukys, Anne Panther

27 October 2026	Valencia Basket (Spanish Basketball Federation)	86–78	(Turkish Basketball Federation) Fenerbahçe Tarfin	Valencia
20:30	Scoring by quarter: 19–9, 17–16, 24–21, 26–32
	Pts: Shorts 23; Rebs: Sako 10; Asts: Shorts 3 PIR: Shorts 25	Boxscore	Pts: Baldwin IV 19; Rebs: Shields 8 Asts: Melli 4 PIR: Baldwin IV 23	Arena: Roig Arena; Attendance: 13,177; Referees: Damir Javor, Sergio Silva, Guido Giovannetti

27 October 2026	Baskonia (Spanish Basketball Federation)	86–104	(Spanish Basketball Federation) Real Madrid	Vitoria-Gasteiz
21:00	Scoring by quarter: 19–30, 27–26, 23–26, 17–22
	Pts: Lawson, Simmons 17; Rebs: Faried 9 Asts: Baugh 8 PIR: Lawson 21	Boxscore	Pts: Maledon 19; Rebs: Tavares 12; Asts: Maledon 6 PIR: Tavares 22	Arena: Buesa Arena; Attendance: 8,136; Referees: Mehdi Difallah, Luka Kardum, Michele Rossi

28 October 2026	Beşiktaş (Turkish Basketball Federation)	73–81	(Hellenic Basketball Federation) Olympiacos	Istanbul
18:30	Scoring by quarter: 23–25, 13–17, 22–19, 15–20
	Pts: Nowell 15; Rebs: Brown 7 Asts: Birsen, Omoruyi 4 PIR: DeJulius 16	Boxscore	Pts: Vezenkov 16; Rebs: three players 5 Asts: Miller-McIntyre 7 PIR: Hall 23	Arena: Basketball Development Center; Attendance: 6,431; Referees: Saša Pukl, Robert Lottermoser, Igor Dragojević

28 October 2026	Hapoel IBI Tel Aviv (Israeli Basketball Association)	118–88	(Turkish Basketball Federation) Anadolu Efes	Botevgrad
19:00	Scoring by quarter: 27–21, 36–20, 27–18, 28–29
	Pts: Blakeney 35; Rebs: Caboclo, Satoranský 7 Asts: Bryant 12; PIR: Blakeney, Bryant 35	Boxscore	Pts: Loyd 19; Rebs: Fernando, Malcolm 6 Asts: Strazel 5 PIR: Loyd 18	Arena: Arena Botevgrad; Attendance: 312; Referees: Ilija Belošević, Ioannis Foufis, Steve Bittner

28 October 2026	LDLC ASVEL (French Federation of Basketball)	82–75	(Basketball Federation of Serbia) Partizan Mozzart Bet	Décines-Charpieu
20:00	Scoring by quarter: 22–19, 14–13, 20–27, 26–16
	Pts: Mills, Waters 14; Rebs: Massa 5 Asts: Waters 7 PIR: Waters 19	Boxscore	Pts: Hayes 15; Rebs: Hayes 8 Asts: Pajola 7 PIR: Hayes 21	Arena: LDLC Arena; Attendance: 8,424; Referees: Juan Carlos García, Marcin Kowalski, Rain Peerandi

28 October 2026	Virtus Bologna (Italian Basketball Federation)	74–91	(Lithuanian Basketball Federation) Žalgiris	Bologna
20:30	Scoring by quarter: 22–14, 13–23, 18–28, 21–26
	Pts: Alston Jr. 18; Rebs: Diarra 6 Asts: three players 3 PIR: Alston Jr., Diarra 16	Boxscore	Pts: Valančiūnas 17; Rebs: Tubelis, Valančiūnas 11; Asts: Lee 5 PIR: Tubelis, Valančiūnas 21	Arena: PalaDozza; Attendance: 5,471; Referees: Carlos Peruga, Jakub Zamojski, Ioannis Tiganis

=== Round 9 ===
29 October 2026	Crvena zvezda Meridanbet (Basketball Federation of Serbia)	103–73	(German Basketball Federation) Bayern Munich	Belgrade
20:00	Scoring by quarter: 19–15, 29–16, 31–23, 24–19
	Pts: Moneke 15; Rebs: Moneke 5 Asts: Weiler-Babb 9 PIR: Moneke 29	Boxscore	Pts: Washington Jr. 16; Rebs: Norris 6 Asts: Jokubaitis 4 PIR: Washington Jr. 16	Arena: Belgrade Arena; Attendance: 15,236; Referees: Mehdi Difallah, Alberto Baena, Maxime Boubert

29 October 2026	Maccabi Rapyd Tel Aviv (Israeli Basketball Association)	94–99	(French Federation of Basketball) Paris Basketball	Belgrade
20:05	Scoring by quarter: 17–25, 19–10, 29–30, 29–34
	Pts: Clark III 21; Rebs: Bacot, Hoard 5 Asts: Madar 9 PIR: Sorkin 18	Boxscore	Pts: Hifi 26; Rebs: Johnson 8 Asts: Johnson 5 PIR: Hifi 30	Arena: Aleksandar Nikolić Hall; Attendance: 88; Referees: Carlos Cortes, Josip Radojković, Luka Kardum

29 October 2026	Real Madrid (Spanish Basketball Federation)	95–76	(Turkish Basketball Federation) Fenerbahçe Tarfin	Madrid
20:45	Scoring by quarter: 22–24, 25–18, 23–13, 25–21
	Pts: Maledon 26; Rebs: Maledon, Okeke 7 Asts: Campazzo 10; PIR: Maledon 35	Boxscore	Pts: Clyburn 21; Rebs: Shields 9 Asts: Baldwin IV, Key 3 PIR: Clyburn 16	Arena: Movistar Arena; Attendance: 9,826; Referees: Borys Ryzhyk, Gytis Vilius, Stefan Ćalić

30 October 2026	Dubai Basketball (United Arab Emirates Basketball Association)	97–83	(Israeli Basketball Association) Hapoel IBI Tel Aviv	Dubai
17:00	Scoring by quarter: 19–22, 26–18, 29–20, 23–23
	Pts: Petrušev 20; Rebs: Kabengele 7 Asts: Okobo 5 PIR: Petrušev 26	Boxscore	Pts: Micić 15; Rebs: three players 4 Asts: Micić 7 PIR: Micić 20	Arena: Coca-Cola Arena; Attendance: 2,700; Referees: Saša Pukl, Robert Lottermoser, Vassilis Pitsilkas

30 October 2026	Anadolu Efes (Turkish Basketball Federation)	83–68	(Hellenic Basketball Federation) Panathinaikos AKTOR	Istanbul
18:30	Scoring by quarter: 21–18, 24–19, 16–14, 22–17
	Pts: Fernando, Malcolm 15; Rebs: Šarić 12; Asts: Payne 8 PIR: Malcolm 21	Boxscore	Pts: Nunn 17; Rebs: Lessort 11; Asts: Grant 5 PIR: Hayes-Davis 14	Arena: Basketball Development Center; Attendance: 9,923; Referees: Milan Nedović, Saulius Račys, Eduard Udyanskyy

30 October 2026	Žalgiris (Lithuanian Basketball Federation)	87–80	(Basketball Federation of Serbia) Partizan Mozzart Bet	Kaunas
19:00	Scoring by quarter: 27–21, 17–19, 25–17, 18–23
	Pts: Edwards 17; Rebs: Valančiūnas 8 Asts: Evans 6 PIR: Valančiūnas 25	Boxscore	Pts: Tanasković 19; Rebs: Thompson 6 Asts: Jones 7 PIR: Tanasković, Thompson 19	Arena: Žalgirio Arena; Attendance: 14,799; Referees: Emin Moğulkoç, Jordi Aliaga, Hugues Thépénier

30 October 2026	LDLC ASVEL (French Federation of Basketball)	94–79	(Spanish Basketball Federation) Baskonia	Décines-Charpieu
20:00	Scoring by quarter: 26–16, 23–23, 26–20, 19–20
	Pts: Washington 21; Rebs: Crowder, Washington 5 Asts: Crowder 5 PIR: Washington 29	Boxscore	Pts: Faried 17; Rebs: Faried 8 Asts: Baugh, Lawson 3 PIR: Fatied 28	Arena: LDLC Arena; Attendance: 8,712; Referees: Tomislav Hordov, Kerem Baki, Ioannis Tiganis

30 October 2026	Olympiacos (Hellenic Basketball Federation)	84–78	(Italian Basketball Federation) Armani Olimpia Milan	Ano Liosia
20:15	Scoring by quarter: 25–19, 19–25, 25–17, 15–17
	Pts: Miller-McIntyre 24; Rebs: Vezenkov 4 Asts: Miller-McIntyre 4 PIR: Vezenkov 22	Boxscore	Pts: Cole 17; Rebs: Burnell 6 Asts: Bolmaro, Hall 4 PIR: Cole 21	Arena: SUNEL Arena; Attendance: 5,147; Referees: Juan Carlos García, Sašo Petek, Hüseyin Çelik

30 October 2026	Virtus Bologna (Italian Basketball Federation)	101–103	(Turkish Basketball Federation) Beşiktaş	Bologna
20:30	Scoring by quarter: 24–24, 30–23, 20–23, 27–33
	Pts: Alston Jr. 19; Rebs: Edwards 7 Asts: Carr 5 PIR: Alston Jr. 19	Boxscore	Pts: Walker IV 30; Rebs: Birsen 6 Asts: Walker IV 5 PIR: Walker IV 36	Arena: PalaDozza; Attendance: 5,471; Referees: Damir Javor, Steve Bittner, Arnau Padrós

30 October 2026	Barcelona (Spanish Basketball Federation)	98–94	(Spanish Basketball Federation) Valencia Basket	Barcelona
20:30	Scoring by quarter: 30–25, 14–17, 25–26, 29–26
	Pts: Robinson 22; Rebs: Nebo 10; Asts: Punter 4 PIR: Parra 24	Boxscore	Pts: Brooks 26; Rebs: Sako 10; Asts: Shorts 5 PIR: Brooks 20	Arena: Palau Blaugrana; Attendance: 6,004; Referees: Oļegs Latiševs, Uroš Obrknežević, Denis Hadžić

=== Round 10 ===
4 November 2026	Real Madrid (Spanish Basketball Federation)	112–115(OT)	(Hellenic Basketball Federation) Panathinaikos AKTOR	Madrid
20:45	Scoring by quarter: 18–24, 30–27, 25–23, 28–27, Overtime: 11–14
	Pts: Feliz 27; Rebs: Tavares 6 Asts: Feliz 6 PIR: Feliz 29	Boxscore	Pts: Nunn 33; Rebs: Lessort 9 Asts: Badio, Lessort 5 PIR: Nunn 32	Arena: Movistar Arena; Attendance: 10,164; Referees: Ilija Belošević, Emin Moğulkoç, Thomas Bissuel

5 November 2026	Anadolu Efes (Turkish Basketball Federation)	90–95	(French Federation of Basketball) Paris Basketball	Istanbul
18:15	Scoring by quarter: 26–23, 10–19, 34–24, 20–29
	Pts: Payne 33; Rebs: Fernando 10; Asts: Payne 7 PIR: Payne 29	Boxscore	Pts: Hifi 28; Rebs: Dokossi 9 Asts: Hifi 9 PIR: Hifi 39	Arena: Basketball Development Center; Attendance: 4,342; Referees: Robert Lottermoser, Oļegs Latiševs, Jordi Aliaga

5 November 2026	Fenerbahçe Tarfin (Turkish Basketball Federation)	84–65	(Spanish Basketball Federation) Baskonia	Istanbul
19:00	Scoring by quarter: 33–18, 19–14, 11–9, 21–24
	Pts: Horton-Tucker 19; Rebs: Bingham 9 Asts: Forrest, Horton-Tucker 4 PIR: Horton-Tucker 22	Boxscore	Pts: Simmons, Stewart 12; Rebs: Faried 15; Asts: Simmons 5 PIR: Faried 22	Arena: Ülker Sports and Event Hall; Attendance: 7,542; Referees: Saša Pukl, Miloš Koljenšić, Joseph Bissang

5 November 2026	Hapoel IBI Tel Aviv (Israeli Basketball Association)	90–93	(Spanish Basketball Federation) Barcelona	Sofia
19:45	Scoring by quarter: 21–19, 25–27, 18–27, 26–20
	Pts: Bryant 25; Rebs: Oturu 7 Asts: Micić 7 PIR: Bryant 35	Boxscore	Pts: Brizuela 22; Rebs: Nebo 10; Asts: Robinson 6 PIR: Brizuela 19	Arena: Arena Sofia; Attendance: 3,428; Referees: Tomislav Hordov, Gytis Vilius, Luka Kardum

5 November 2026	LDLC ASVEL (French Federation of Basketball)	95–99	(German Basketball Federation) Bayern Munich	Décines-Charpieu
20:00	Scoring by quarter: 21–20, 24–25, 21–28, 29–26
	Pts: Mills 22; Rebs: Sestina, Washington 4 Asts: Crowder 8 PIR: Gach 18	Boxscore	Pts: Wiley 22; Rebs: Wiley 9 Asts: Lučić 8 PIR: Wiley 32	Arena: LDLC Arena; Attendance: 7,042; Referees: Damir Javor, Michele Rossi, Stefan Ćalić

5 November 2026	Armani Olimpia Milan (Italian Basketball Federation)	73–84	(Spanish Basketball Federation) Valencia Basket	Assago
20:30	Scoring by quarter: 15–24, 22–16, 22–11, 14–33
	Pts: Bolmaro 16; Rebs: Bolmaro 5 Asts: Cole 5 PIR: Diop 18	Boxscore	Pts: Taylor 17; Rebs: Sako, Taylor 5 Asts: Shorts 5 PIR: Taylor 24	Arena: Unipol Forum; Attendance: 6,317; Referees: Milan Nedović, Marcin Kowalski, Rain Peerandi

6 November 2026	Beşiktaş (Turkish Basketball Federation)	67–83	(Lithuanian Basketball Federation) Žalgiris	Istanbul
18:00	Scoring by quarter: 17–20, 14–25, 13–17, 23–21
	Pts: Omoruyi 17; Rebs: Brown 9 Asts: Dotson 5 PIR: Omoruyi 20	Boxscore	Pts: Tubelis 14; Rebs: Valančiūnas 11; Asts: Butkevičius, Lee 3 PIR: Valančiūnas 23	Arena: Basketball Development Center; Attendance: 6,350; Referees: Juan Carlos García, Emilio Pérez, Mario Majkić

6 November 2026	Olympiacos (Hellenic Basketball Federation)	57–62	(Basketball Federation of Serbia) Crvena zvezda Meridianbet	Ano Liosia
20:15	Scoring by quarter: 11–19, 11–21, 19–11, 16–11
	Pts: Vezenkov 27; Rebs: Vezenkov 6 Asts: Fournier 3 PIR: Vezenkov 28	Boxscore	Pts: Nwora 18; Rebs: Nwora 13; Asts: Jones, Weiler-Babb 3 PIR: Nwora 23	Arena: SUNEL Arena; Attendance: 7,237; Referees: Carlos Peruga, Borys Ryzhyk, Hugues Thépénier

6 November 2026	Virtus Bologna (Italian Basketball Federation)	75–93	(United Arab Emirates Basketball Association) Dubai Basketball	Bologna
20:30	Scoring by quarter: 17–21, 17–27, 19–28, 22–17
	Pts: Diarra 19; Rebs: Diarra 7 Asts: Bello 4 PIR: Diarra 30	Boxscore	Pts: Kabengele, Wright 16; Rebs: Kabengele 9 Asts: Bacon, Musa 5 PIR: Musa 18	Arena: PalaDozza; Attendance: 5,458; Referees: Carlos Cortés, Kristaps Konstantinovs, Leandro Lezcano

6 November 2026	Partizan Mozzart Bet (Basketball Federation of Serbia)	88–67	(Israeli Basketball Association) Maccabi Rapyd Tel Aviv	Belgrade
20:45	Scoring by quarter: 28–23, 22–12, 22–17, 16–15
	Pts: Thompson 16; Rebs: Stevens 8 Asts: Jones 7 PIR: Stevens 22	Boxscore	Pts: Theis 11; Rebs: Brissett 7 Asts: Clark 6 PIR: Theis 15	Arena: Belgrade Arena; Attendance: 13,812; Referees: Mehdi Difallah, Manuel Attard, Christian Theis

=== Round 11 ===
11 November 2026	Partizan Mozzart Bet (Basketball Federation of Serbia)	80–66	(Spanish Basketball Federation) Baskonia	Belgrade
20:45	Scoring by quarter: 23–18, 19–20, 23–22, 15–6
	Pts: Jekiri 17; Rebs: Jekiri 6 Asts: Jones 6 PIR: Jekiri 25	Boxscore	Pts: Duarte 15; Rebs: Faried 8 Asts: Duarte, Simmons 3 PIR: Duarte 18	Arena: Belgrade Arena; Attendance: 13,706; Referees: Borys Ryzhyk, Oļegs Latiševs, Maxime Boubert

11 November 2026	Paris Basketball (French Federation of Basketball)	111–109(OT)	(Turkish Basketball Federation) Fenerbahçe Tarfin	Paris
20:45	Scoring by quarter: 23–14, 27–29, 22–29, 20–20, Overtime: 19–17
	Pts: Ntilikina 22; Rebs: three players 5 Asts: Herrera 6 PIR: Ntilikina 21	Boxscore	Pts: Horton-Tucker 32; Rebs: Horton-Tucker 10; Asts: Baldwin, Shields 4 PIR: Horton-Tucker 33	Arena: Adidas Arena; Attendance: 11,774; Referees: Juan Carlos García, Eduard Udyanskyy, Franko Gracin

12 November 2026	Maccabi Rapyd Tel Aviv (Israeli Basketball Association)	80–73	(Israeli Basketball Association) Hapoel IBI Tel Aviv	Limassol
20:05	Scoring by quarter: 25–21, 16–12, 15–19, 24–21
	Pts: Colson, Clark 14; Rebs: Brissett, Clark 5 Asts: Madar 6 PIR: Colson 15	Boxscore	Pts: Micić 14; Rebs: Oturu 8 Asts: Satoranský 6 PIR: Oturu 20	Arena: Spyros Kyprianou Arena; Attendance: 1,212; Referees: Carlos Peruga, Ilija Belošević, Jordi Aliaga

12 November 2026	Olympiacos (Hellenic Basketball Federation)	101–72	(United Arab Emirates Basketball Association) Dubai Basketball	Ano Liosia
20:15	Scoring by quarter: 25–18, 32–25, 31–13, 13–16
	Pts: Fournier 28; Rebs: Ndiaye 6 Asts: Miller-McIntyre 5 PIR: Fournier 28	Boxscore	Pts: Bacon 20; Rebs: Musa 7 Asts: Kabengele 4 PIR: Kabengele 20	Arena: SUNEL Arena; Attendance: 5,129; Referees: Emilio Pérez, Jakub Zamojski, Manuel Attard

12 November 2026	Valencia Basket (Spanish Basketball Federation)	102–87	(German Basketball Federation) Bayern Munich	Valencia
20:30	Scoring by quarter: 29–19, 23–22, 21–24, 29–22
	Pts: Brooks, Shorts 14; Rebs: Rivero, Sako 7 Asts: Shorts 10; PIR: Shorts 23	Boxscore	Pts: Obst 22; Rebs: Wiley 9 Asts: Obst 5 PIR: Wiley 18	Arena: Roig Arena; Attendance: 12,927; Referees: Emin Moğulkoç, Gytis Vilius, Joseph Bissang

12 November 2026	Armani Olimpia Milan (Italian Basketball Federation)	83–86	(Lithuanian Basketball Federation) Žalgiris	Assago
20:30	Scoring by quarter: 25–18, 16–27, 11–18, 31–23
	Pts: Gudurić 20; Rebs: Ricci 6 Asts: Thompson 4 PIR: Gudurić 15	Boxscore	Pts: Valančiūnas 17; Rebs: Valančiūnas 20; Asts: Evans 5 PIR: Valančiūnas 36	Arena: Unipol Forum; Attendance: 6,476; Referees: Carlos Cortés, Luka Kardum, Alberto Baena

12 November 2026	Real Madrid (Spanish Basketball Federation)	105–84	(Basketball Federation of Serbia) Crvena zvezda Meridianbet	Madrid
21:00	Scoring by quarter: 38–20, 18–21, 26–18, 23–25
	Pts: Luwawu-Cabarrot 22; Rebs: Pradilla 8 Asts: Feliz 7 PIR: Luwawu-Cabarrot 24	Boxscore	Pts: Carter 18; Rebs: Moneke 5 Asts: five players 3 PIR: Nwora 18	Arena: Movistar Arena; Attendance: 8,670; Referees: Robert Lottermoser, Kristaps Konstantinovs, Rain Peerandi

13 November 2026	Anadolu Efes (Turkish Basketball Federation)	103–91	(Italian Basketball Federation) Virtus Bologna	Istanbul
18:30	Scoring by quarter: 28–20, 32–23, 16–25, 27–23
	Pts: Loyd 22; Rebs: Fernando 10; Asts: Payne, Strazel 8 PIR: Loyd 28	Boxscore	Pts: Alston 15; Rebs: Diarra, Edwards 6 Asts: Frazier 10; PIR: Diouf 16	Arena: Basketball Development Center; Attendance: 3,855; Referees: Tomislav Hordov, Artūras Šukys, Hugues Thepenier

13 November 2026	Panathinaikos AKTOR (Hellenic Basketball Federation)	74–76	(Spanish Basketball Federation) Barcelona	Marousi
20:15	Scoring by quarter: 17–17, 16–15, 24–11, 17–33
	Pts: Nunn 19; Rebs: Nunn, Yabusele 6 Asts: Hayes-Davis 6 PIR: Nunn 19	Boxscore	Pts: Robinson 24; Rebs: Nkamhoua 7 Asts: Brizuela, Martin 3 PIR: Robinson 20	Arena: Telekom Center Athens; Attendance: 19,073; Referees: Mehdi Difallah, Damir Javor, Milivoje Jovčić

13 November 2026	LDLC ASVEL (French Federation of Basketball)	91–95	(Turkish Basketball Federation) Beşiktaş	Décines-Charpieu
20:30	Scoring by quarter: 28–25, 24–18, 16–22, 23–30
	Pts: Waters 26; Rebs: Massa 6 Asts: Washington 3 PIR: Waters 30	Boxscore	Pts: Wilbekin 16; Rebs: Omoruyi 7 Asts: DeJulius, Omoruyi 6 PIR: Omoruyi 23	Arena: LDLC Arena; Attendance: 8,267; Referees: Milan Nedović, Sašo Petek, Piotr Pastusiak

=== Round 12 ===
17 November 2026	Dubai Basketball (United Arab Emirates Basketball Association)	80–75	(Turkish Basketball Federation) Anadolu Efes	Dubai
17:00	Scoring by quarter: 15–23, 27–17, 17–15, 21–20
	Pts: Kabengele 18; Rebs: Kabengele 18; Asts: Musa 7 PIR: Musa 27	Boxscore	Pts: Strazel 20; Rebs: Dozier 7 Asts: Payne 6 PIR: Strazel 20	Arena: Coca-Cola Arena; Attendance: 5,470; Referees: Gytis Vilius, Michele Rossi, Sergio Manuel

17 November 2026	Maccabi Rapyd Tel Aviv (Israeli Basketball Association)	95–97(OT)	(Hellenic Basketball Federation) Olympiacos	Limassol
18:00	Scoring by quarter: 18–28, 18–21, 18–12, 28–21, Overtime: 13–15
	Pts: Wallace 18; Rebs: Hoard, Sorkin 7 Asts: Clark 7 PIR: Clark 18	Boxscore	Pts: Vezenkov 37; Rebs: Vezenkov 9 Asts: Miller-McIntyre, Ward 6 PIR: Vezenkov 41	Arena: Spyros Kyprianou Arena; Attendance: 2,313; Referees: Emin Moğulkoç, Sašo Petek, Eduard Udyanskyy

17 November 2026	Žalgiris (Lithuanian Basketball Federation)	117–114(OT)	(German Basketball Federation) Bayern Munich	Kaunas
19:00	Scoring by quarter: 19–25, 31–32, 28–22, 23–22, Overtime: 16–13
	Pts: Edwards 32; Rebs: Sleva 10; Asts: three players 4 PIR: Edwards 21	Boxscore	Pts: Thiemann 33; Rebs: Da Silva 12; Asts: Jokubaitis 5 PIR: Thiemann 34	Arena: Žalgirio Arena; Attendance: 14,618; Referees: Tomislav Hordov, Milivoje Jovčić, Thomas Bissuel

17 November 2026	Fenerbahçe Tarfin (Turkish Basketball Federation)	115–81	(French Federation of Basketball) LDLC ASVEL	Istanbul
19:00	Scoring by quarter: 32–12, 22–27, 35–22, 26–20
	Pts: Larkin 25; Rebs: Juzang 11; Asts: Forrest 7 PIR: Larkin 26	Boxscore	Pts: Dossou-Yovo 19; Rebs: Dossou-Yovo 7 Asts: Waters 6 PIR: Dossou-Yovo 23	Arena: Ülker Sports and Event Hall; Attendance: 8,316; Referees: Carlos Cortés, Alberto Baena, Saulius Račys

17 November 2026	Barcelona (Spanish Basketball Federation)	86–89	(French Federation of Basketball) Paris Basketball	Barcelona
20:30	Scoring by quarter: 20–24, 26–19, 23–25, 17–21
	Pts: Balcerowski 17; Rebs: Nebo 12; Asts: Brizuela 9 PIR: Balcerowski 28	Boxscore	Pts: Hifi 25; Rebs: Johnson 8 Asts: Hifi 8 PIR: Hifi 29	Arena: Palau Blaugrana; Attendance: 5,534; Referees: Saša Pukl, Milos Miloš Koljenšić, Rain Peerandi

17 November 2026	Armani Olimpia Milan (Italian Basketball Federation)	91–77	(Basketball Federation of Serbia) Crvena zvezda Meridianbet	Assago
20:30	Scoring by quarter: 26–20, 16–24, 24–17, 25–16
	Pts: Bolmaro 15; Rebs: Peters 7 Asts: Thompson 8 PIR: Thompson 20	Boxscore	Pts: Carter 21; Rebs: Koloko 9 Asts: Carter 5 PIR: Koloko 17	Arena: Unipol Forum; Attendance: 6,252; Referees: Juan Carlos García, Jordi Aliaga, Maxime Boubert

17 November 2026	Baskonia (Spanish Basketball Federation)	82–85	(Israeli Basketball Association) Hapoel IBI Tel Aviv	Vitoria-Gasteiz
20:30	Scoring by quarter: 33–26, 15–18, 23–20, 11–21
	Pts: Stewart 15; Rebs: Kamenjaš 12; Asts: Simmons 7 PIR: Kamenjaš 19	Boxscore	Pts: Odiase 16; Rebs: Bryant 6 Asts: Micić 8 PIR: Micić, Odiase 19	Arena: Buesa Arena; Attendance: 2,186; Referees: Mehdi Difallah, Piotr Pastusiak, Stefan Ćalić

17 November 2026	Partizan Mozzart Bet (Basketball Federation of Serbia)	64–76	(Spanish Basketball Federation) Valencia Basket	Belgrade
20:45	Scoring by quarter: 13–16, 21–20, 17–16, 13–24
	Pts: Jones 21; Rebs: Franks 6 Asts: Jones 5 PIR: Jones 27	Boxscore	Pts: Brooks, Taylor 15; Rebs: Sako 11; Asts: Cárdenas 3 PIR: Taylor 17	Arena: Belgrade Arena; Attendance: 13,956; Referees: Robert Lottermoser, Artūras Šukys, Hugues Thépénier

17 November 2026	Virtus Bologna (Italian Basketball Federation)	84–79	(Hellenic Basketball Federation) Panathinaikos AKTOR	Bologna
21:00	Scoring by quarter: 19–20, 21–23, 20–13, 24–23
	Pts: Diarra, Diouf 15; Rebs: Diarra 9 Asts: Carr 7 PIR: Diarra 24	Boxscore	Pts: Nunn 18; Rebs: Nunn 8 Asts: Francisco 7 PIR: three players 15	Arena: PalaDozza; Referees: Carlos Peruga, Emilio Pérez, Jakub Zamojski

18 November 2026	Beşiktaş (Turkish Basketball Federation)	83–79	(Spanish Basketball Federation) Real Madrid	Istanbul
18:00	Scoring by quarter: 18–15, 27–22, 19–17, 19–25
	Pts: Jeffries 20; Rebs: Gabriel 7 Asts: Omoruyi 6 PIR: Jeffries 24	Boxscore	Pts: Maledon 22; Rebs: Tavares 8 Asts: Pradilla 4 PIR: Maledon 26	Arena: Basketball Development Center; Attendance: 8,086; Referees: Borys Ryzhyk, Marcin Kowalski, Franko Gracin

=== Round 13 ===
19 November 2026	Maccabi Rapyd Tel Aviv (Israeli Basketball Association)	74–80	(United Arab Emirates Basketball Association) Dubai Basketball	Limassol
18:15	Scoring by quarter: 26–14, 21–26, 15–18, 12–22
	Pts: Madar 17; Rebs: Brissett 7 Asts: Madar 5 PIR: Madar 22	Boxscore	Pts: Bacon 18; Rebs: Kabengele 11; Asts: Okobo 6 PIR: Bacon 16	Arena: Spyros Kyprianou Arena; Attendance: 662; Referees: Juan Carlos García, Tomasz Trawicki, Anne Panther

19 November 2026	Žalgiris (Lithuanian Basketball Federation)	72–87	(Hellenic Basketball Federation) Panathinaikos AKTOR	Kaunas
19:00	Scoring by quarter: 17–28, 22–19, 16–12, 17–28
	Pts: Tubelis 17; Rebs: Tubelis, Valančiūnas 6 Asts: Evans 6 PIR: Tubelis 21	Boxscore	Pts: Nunn 21; Rebs: Hayes-Davis, Yabusele 6 Asts: three players 3 PIR: Nunn 24	Arena: Žalgirio Arena; Attendance: 15,110; Referees: Saša Pukl, Seffi Shemmesh, Piotr Pastusiak

19 November 2026	Bayern Munich (German Basketball Federation)	100–81	(Spanish Basketball Federation) Baskonia	Munich
20:00	Scoring by quarter: 29–24, 26–17, 21–24, 24–16
	Pts: Washington 23; Rebs: Beauchamp, Washington 7 Asts: Jokubaitis 6 PIR: Washington 33	Boxscore	Pts: Stewart 17; Rebs: Kamenjaš 13; Asts: Simmons 5 PIR: Kamenjas, Simmons 25	Arena: SAP Garden; Attendance: 8,012; Referees: Milan Nedović, Artūras Šukys, Dragan Porobić

19 November 2026	Armani Olimpia Milan (Italian Basketball Federation)	78–70	(Turkish Basketball Federation) Fenerbahçe Tarfin	Assago
20:30	Scoring by quarter: 23–19, 14–19, 18–23, 23–9
	Pts: Wright 22; Rebs: Wright 11; Asts: Bolmaro 5 PIR: Wright 36	Boxscore	Pts: Horton-Tucker 17; Rebs: Powell 7 Asts: Baldwin IV 4 PIR: Horton-Tucker 16	Arena: Unipol Forum; Attendance: 7,203; Referees: Carlos Peruga, Emilio Pérez, Steve Bittner

19 November 2026	Paris Basketball (French Federation of Basketball)	97–96	(Israeli Basketball Association) Hapoel IBI Tel Aviv	Paris
20:45	Scoring by quarter: 22–26, 26–19, 32–27, 17–24
	Pts: Hifi 18; Rebs: Faye 8 Asts: Dokossi, Hifi 5 PIR: Hifi 23	Boxscore	Pts: Blakeney 28; Rebs: LeDay 8 Asts: Micić 6 PIR: Blakeney 24	Arena: Adidas Arena; Attendance: 6,365; Referees: Carlos Cortés, Milivoje Jovčić, Tolga Akkuşoğlu

19 November 2026	Valencia Basket (Spanish Basketball Federation)	92–87	(Italian Basketball Federation) Virtus Bologna	Valencia
21:00	Scoring by quarter: 30–25, 20–15, 17–23, 25–24
	Pts: Sako, Shorts 20; Rebs: Sako 11; Asts: Shorts 8 PIR: Sako 26	Boxscore	Pts: Bello 15; Rebs: Klintman 9 Asts: Moore 5 PIR: Klintman 19	Arena: Roig Arena; Attendance: 12,362; Referees: Oļegs Latiševs, Robert Vyklický, Adar Peer

20 November 2026	Anadolu Efes (Turkish Basketball Federation)	107–81	(French Federation of Basketball) LDLC ASVEL	Istanbul
18:30	Scoring by quarter: 25–17, 29–24, 31–25, 22–15
	Pts: Loyd, Strazel 20; Rebs: Jones, Šarić 7 Asts: Payne 8 PIR: Strazel 25	Boxscore	Pts: Fodzo Dada, Sestina 25; Rebs: Gach 5 Asts: Fodzo Dada 5 PIR: Fodzo Dada 17	Arena: Basketball Development Center; Attendance: 5,423; Referees: Robert Lottermoser, Damir Javor, Mario Majkić

20 November 2026	Olympiacos (Hellenic Basketball Federation)	92–76	(Spanish Basketball Federation) Real Madrid	Ano Liosia
20:15	Scoring by quarter: 19–14, 31–19, 23–19, 19–24
	Pts: T. Jones 22; Rebs: T. Jones 8 Asts: Miller-McIntyre 6 PIR: Jones 30	Boxscore	Pts: Maledon 17; Rebs: D. Jones 11; Asts: Maledon 7 PIR: Maledon 24	Arena: SUNEL Arena; Attendance: 8,238; Referees: Ilija Belošević, Mehdi Difallah, Luka Kardum

20 November 2026	Barcelona (Spanish Basketball Federation)	100–103(OT)	(Basketball Federation of Serbia) Crvena zvezda Meridianbet	Barcelona
20:30	Scoring by quarter: 23–15, 17–29, 26–24, 19–17, Overtime: 15–18
	Pts: Brizuela 22; Rebs: Minaya, Parra 7 Asts: Robinson 9 PIR: Brizuela 31	Boxscore	Pts: Carter 31; Rebs: Koloko 7 Asts: Bulter 6 PIR: Carter 30	Arena: Palau Blaugrana; Attendance: 4,915; Referees: Emin Mogulkoc, Ioannis Foufis, Christian Theis

20 November 2026	Partian Mozzart Bet (Basketball Federation of Serbia)	91–87(OT)	(Turkish Basketball Federation) Beşiktaş	Belgrade
20:45	Scoring by quarter: 20–22, 21–19, 22–18, 14–18, Overtime: 14–10
	Pts: Jones 21; Rebs: Franks 6 Asts: Pajola 8 PIR: Allman 25	Boxscore	Pts: Walker IV 22; Rebs: Omoruyi 9 Asts: Wilbekin 10; PIR: Wilbekin 25	Arena: Belgrade Arena; Referees: Gytis Vilius, Kristaps Konstantinovs, Joseph Bissang
