= 2026 EuroLeague Playoffs =

European basketball postseason play

The 2026 EuroLeague Playoffs are the second postseason portion of the 2025–26 EuroLeague basketball competition. They began on 21 April 2026, with the Play-in games, and ended on 24 May 2026. The top six finishers in the regular season qualified for the playoffs directly, while the teams placed from seventh to tenth will battle for the remaining two seeds in a play-in tournament. The playoffs consist of four series of two teams each, to be played in a best-of-five format. The winners of each of the playoffs series advanced to the Final Four, which will determine the EuroLeague champion for the 2025–26 season.

== Qualified teams ==
| Pos | Team | Pld | W | L | PF | PA | PD | Qualification |
|---|---|---|---|---|---|---|---|---|
| 1 | (Hellenic Basketball Federation) Olympiacos | 38 | 26 | 12 | 3406 | 3144 | +262 | Qualification to playoffs |
| 2 | (Spanish Basketball Federation) Valencia Basket | 38 | 25 | 13 | 3418 | 3243 | +175 | Qualification to playoffs |
| 3 | (Spanish Basketball Federation) Real Madrid | 38 | 24 | 14 | 3342 | 3156 | +186 | Qualification to playoffs |
| 4 | (Turkish Basketball Federation) Fenerbahçe Beko | 38 | 24 | 14 | 3114 | 3061 | +53 | Qualification to playoffs |
| 5 | (Lithuanian Basketball Federation) Žalgiris | 38 | 23 | 15 | 3304 | 3125 | +179 | Qualification to playoffs |
| 6 | (Israeli Basketball Association) Hapoel IBI Tel Aviv | 38 | 23 | 15 | 3329 | 3211 | +118 | Qualification to playoffs |
| 7 | (Hellenic Basketball Federation) Panathinaikos AKTOR | 38 | 22 | 16 | 3314 | 3228 | +86 | Qualification to play-in |
| 8 | (French Federation of Basketball) Monaco | 38 | 22 | 16 | 3417 | 3282 | +135 | Qualification to play-in |
| 9 | (Spanish Basketball Federation) Barcelona | 38 | 21 | 17 | 3167 | 3147 | +20 | Qualification to play-in |
| 10 | (Basketball Federation of Serbia) Crvena zvezda Meridianbet | 38 | 21 | 17 | 3287 | 3245 | +42 | Qualification to play-in |

Source: EuroLeague
Rules for classification: Regular season tiebreakers

=== Tiebreakers ===
When more than two teams are tied, the ranking will be established taking into account the victories obtained in the games played only among them. Should the tie persist among some, but not all, of the teams, the ranking of the teams still tied will be determined by again taking into account the victories in the games played only among them, and repeating this same procedure until the tie is entirely resolved. If a tie persists, the ranking will be determined by the goal difference in favour and against in the games played only among the teams still tied.

== Play-in ==
Under the format introduced in 2024, the 7th to 10th-ranked teams faced each other in the play-in. Each game is hosted by the team with the higher regular season record. The format was similar to the first two rounds of the Page–McIntyre system for a four-team playoff that was identical to that of the NBA play-in tournament. First, the 7th seed will host the 8th seed, with the winner advancing to the playoffs as the 7th seed; likewise the 9th seed will host the 10th seed, with the loser eliminated. Then the loser of the 7-v-8 game will host the winner of the 9-v-10 game, with the winner of that game getting the final playoff spot, as the 8th seed.

Round 1
Play-In A
7 | (Hellenic Basketball Federation) Panathinaikos AKTOR | 87
8 | (French Federation of Basketball) Monaco | 79
Play-In B
9 | (Spanish Basketball Federation) Barcelona | 80
10 | (Basketball Federation of Serbia) Crvena zvezda Meridianbet | 72

Round 2
Play-In C
8 | (French Federation of Basketball) Monaco | 79
9 | (Spanish Basketball Federation) Barcelona | 70

=== Matches ===
| 21 April 2026 Play-in A | Panathinaikos AKTOR (Hellenic Basketball Federation) | 87–79 | (French Federation of Basketball) Monaco | Marousi |
| 20:00 CEST | Scoring by quarter: 23–14, 26–20, 17–23, 21–22 |
| | Pts: Shorts 21; Rebs: Faried 8 Asts: Sloukas 5 PIR: Shorts 24 | Boxscore | Pts: James 25; Rebs: Begarin, Hayes 6 Asts: James 7 PIR: James 27 | Arena: Telekom Center Athens; Attendance: 19,033; Referees: Carlos Peruga, Oļegs Latiševs, Milan Nedović |

| 21 April 2026 Play-in B | Barcelona (Spanish Basketball Federation) | 80–72 | (Basketball Federation of Serbia) Crvena zvezda Meridianbet | Barcelona |
| 20:45 CEST | Scoring by quarter: 29–21, 18–12, 16–18, 17–21 |
| | Pts: Punter, Clyburn 22; Rebs: Clyburn 7 Asts: Satoranský 7 PIR: Clyburn 26 | Boxscore | Pts: Miller-McIntyre 19; Rebs: Izundu, Moneke 7 Asts: Miller-McIntyre 3 PIR: Izundu 15 | Arena: Palau Blaugrana; Attendance: 5,252; Referees: Robert Lottermoser, Mehdi Difallah, Gytis Vilius |

| 24 April 2026 Play-in C | Monaco (French Federation of Basketball) | 79–70 | (Spanish Basketball Federation) Barcelona | Fontvieille |
| 19:30 CEST | Scoring by quarter: 26–14, 23–21, 9–18, 21–17 |
| | Pts: Theis 16; Rebs: Blossomgame 10; Asts: James 10; PIR: Blossomgame 23 | Boxscore | Pts: Clyburn 16; Rebs: Clyburn, Shengelia 7 Asts: Veselý, Shengelia 3 PIR: Shengelia 19 | Arena: Salle Gaston Médecin; Attendance: 4,055; Referees: Saša Pukl, Emin Moğulkoç, Luka Kardum |

== Playoff series ==
Playoff series are best-of-five. The first team to win three games wins the series. A 2–2–1 format is used – teams with home-court advantage played games 1, 2, and 5 at home, while their opponents will host games 3 and 4. Games 4 and 5 will only be played if necessary. The four winning teams advance to the Final Four.

| Team 1 | Series | Team 2 | Game 1 | Game 2 | Game 3 | Game 4 | Game 5 |
|---|---|---|---|---|---|---|---|
| Olympiacos (Hellenic Basketball Federation) | 3–0 | (French Federation of Basketball) Monaco | 91–70 | 94–64 | 105–82 | — | — |
| Valencia Basket (Spanish Basketball Federation) | 3–2 | (Hellenic Basketball Federation) Panathinaikos AKTOR | 67–68 | 105–107 (OT) | 91–87 | 89–86 | 81–64 |
| Real Madrid (Spanish Basketball Federation) | 3–1 | (Israeli Basketball Association) Hapoel IBI Tel Aviv | 86–82 | 102–75 | 69–76 | 87–81 | — |
| Fenerbahçe Beko (Turkish Basketball Federation) | 3–1 | (Lithuanian Basketball Federation) Žalgiris | 89–78 | 86–74 | 78–81 | 94–90 (OT) | — |

=== Olympiacos vs. Monaco ===
| 28 April 2026 Game 1 | Olympiacos (Hellenic Basketball Federation) | 91–70 (Series: 1–0) | (French Federation of Basketball) Monaco | Piraeus |
| 21:00 EEST | Scoring by quarter: 19–20, 26–16, 21–15, 25–19 |
| | Pts: Vezenkov 20; Rebs: Milutinov 10; Asts: Walkup 7 PIR: Milutinov 25 | Boxscore | Pts: James 19; Rebs: Diallo 7 Asts: James 7 PIR: James 30 | Arena: Peace and Friendship Stadium; Attendance: 12,750; Referees: Emilio Pérez, Jakub Zamojski, Sašo Petek |

| 30 April 2026 Game 2 | Olympiacos (Hellenic Basketball Federation) | 94–64 (Series: 2–0) | (French Federation of Basketball) Monaco | Piraeus |
| 21:00 EEST | Scoring by quarter: 28–23, 31–8, 13–22, 22–11 |
| | Pts: Vezenkov 21; Rebs: Peters, Vezenkov 7 Asts: Fournier 7 PIR: Vezenkov 28 | Boxscore | Pts: Hayes 11; Rebs: Hayes, Strazel 5 Asts: Okobo, Strazel 4 PIR: Hayes 14 | Arena: Peace and Friendship Stadium; Attendance: 12,750; Referees: Saša Pukl, Carlos Cortés, Luka Kardum |

| 5 May 2026 Game 3 | Monaco (French Federation of Basketball) | 82–105 (Series: 0–3) | (Hellenic Basketball Federation) Olympiacos | Fontvieille |
| 19:45 CEST | Scoring by quarter: 17–26, 23–35, 24–21, 18–23 |
| | Pts: Strazel 21; Rebs: Begarin, James 6 Asts: Okobo, James 6 PIR: Strazel 25 | Boxscore | Pts: Peters 18; Rebs: Peters, Vezenkov 6 Asts: three players 5 PIR: Fournier 23 | Arena: Salle Gaston Médecin; Attendance: 4,934; Referees: Carlos Peruga, Tomislav Hordov, Jordi Aliaga |

=== Valencia Basket vs. Panathinaikos AKTOR ===
| 28 April 2026 Game 1 | Valencia Basket (Spanish Basketball Federation) | 67–68 (Series: 0–1) | (Hellenic Basketball Federation) Panathinaikos AKTOR | Valencia |
| 20:45 CEST | Scoring by quarter: 15–23, 17–16, 17–15, 18–14 |
| | Pts: Montero 15; Rebs: Pradilla 7 Asts: Badio 5 PIR: Montero 19 | Boxscore | Pts: Nunn 21; Rebs: Lessort, Osman 7 Asts: three players 2 PIR: Lessort 19 | Arena: Roig Arena; Attendance: 14,254; Referees: Damir Javor, Oļegs Latiševs, Milan Nedović |

| 30 April 2026 Game 2 | Valencia Basket (Spanish Basketball Federation) | 105–107(OT) (Series: 0–2) | (Hellenic Basketball Federation) Panathinaikos AKTOR | Valencia |
| 20:45 CEST | Scoring by quarter: 23–24, 25–25, 23–25, 24–21, Overtime: 10–12 |
| | Pts: Montero 21; Rebs: Taylor 7 Asts: Badio, Montero 6 PIR: Montero 25 | Boxscore | Pts: Hayes-Davis 27; Rebs: Osman 8 Asts: Shorts 6 PIR: Hayes-Davis 29 | Arena: Roig Arena; Attendance: 14,656; Referees: Sreten Radović, Robert Lottermoser, Tomislav Hordov |

| 6 May 2026 Game 3 | Panathinaikos AKTOR (Hellenic Basketball Federation) | 87–91 (Series: 2–1) | (Spanish Basketball Federation) Valencia Basket | Marousi |
| 21:15 EEST | Scoring by quarter: 18–24, 21–28, 27–23, 21–16 |
| | Pts: Shorts 17; Rebs: Lessort 8 Asts: Grant 7 PIR: Rogkavopoulos 18 | Boxscore | Pts: Badio, Montero 16; Rebs: Badio, Costello 6 Asts: Montero 9 PIR: Montero 21 | Arena: Telekom Center Athens; Attendance: 19,012; Referees: Damir Javor, Milan Nedović, Artūras Šukys |

| 8 May 2026 Game 4 | Panathinaikos AKTOR (Hellenic Basketball Federation) | 86–89 (Series: 2–2) | (Spanish Basketball Federation) Valencia Basket | Marousi |
| 21:15 EEST | Scoring by quarter: 15–26, 22–18, 19–16, 30–29 |
| | Pts: Osman 26; Rebs: Lessort 11; Asts: Grant 7 PIR: Osman 25 | Boxscore | Pts: Montero 29; Rebs: Montero, Badio 7 Asts: Montero 7 PIR: Montero 45 | Arena: Telekom Center Athens; Attendance: 19,031; Referees: Sreten Radović, Mehdi Difallah, Sašo Petek |

| 13 May 2026 Game 5 | Valencia Basket (Spanish Basketball Federation) | 81–64 (Series: 3–2) | (Hellenic Basketball Federation) Panathinaikos AKTOR | Valencia |
| 21:00 CEST | Scoring by quarter: 14–10, 21–13, 21–27, 25–14 |
| | Pts: Badio 20; Rebs: Taylor 7 Asts: Taylor 5 PIR: Badio 25 | Boxscore | Pts: Hayes-Davis 15; Rebs: Hernangómez 6 Asts: Grant 10; PIR: Grant 20 | Arena: Roig Arena; Attendance: 15,600; Referees: Robert Lottermoser, Damir Javor, Milan Nedović |

=== Real Madrid vs. Hapoel IBI Tel Aviv ===
| 29 April 2026 Game 1 | Real Madrid (Spanish Basketball Federation) | 86–82 (Series: 1–0) | (Israeli Basketball Association) Hapoel IBI Tel Aviv | Madrid |
| 20:45 CEST | Scoring by quarter: 27–18, 21–15, 22–22, 16–27 |
| | Pts: Campazzo 21; Rebs: Okeke 7 Asts: Hezonja 5 PIR: Campazzo 18 | Boxscore | Pts: Blakeney 25; Rebs: Oturu 17; Asts: Jones 8 PIR: Oturu 38 | Arena: Movistar Arena; Attendance: 6,908 (Note: Real Madrid played their playoff series home games against Hapoel IBI Tel Aviv with attendance limited to season ticket holders for safety reasons.); Referees: Ilija Belošević, Gytis Vilius, Kristaps Konstantinovs |

| 1 May 2026 Game 2 | Real Madrid (Spanish Basketball Federation) | 102–75 (Series: 2–0) | (Israeli Basketball Association) Hapoel IBI Tel Aviv | Madrid |
| 20:45 CEST | Scoring by quarter: 24–21, 16–21, 33–20, 29–13 |
| | Pts: Campazzo 23; Rebs: Garuba 9 Asts: Campazzo 6 PIR: Campazzo 30 | Boxscore | Pts: Oturu 19; Rebs: Bryant, Blakeney 5 Asts: Bryant, Micić 4 PIR: Oturu 16 | Arena: Movistar Arena; Attendance: 6,588; Referees: Emin Moğulkoç, Mehdi Difallah, Marcin Kowalski |

| 5 May 2026 Game 3 | Hapoel IBI Tel Aviv (Israeli Basketball Association) | 76–69 (Series: 1–2) | (Spanish Basketball Federation) Real Madrid | Botevgrad (Note: On March 4, 2026, the EuroLeague announced Hapoel IBI Tel Aviv would play their home matches in Bulgaria due to the inability to host matches in Israel as a result of the 2026 Iran war.) |
| 19:00 EEST | Scoring by quarter: 18–21, 16–15, 21–10, 21–23 |
| | Pts: Jones, Bryant 19; Rebs: Edwards 10; Asts: Bryant 3 PIR: Bryant 28 | Boxscore | Pts: Lyles 14; Rebs: three players 5 Asts: Maledon 5 PIR: Lyles 17 | Arena: Arena Botevgrad; Attendance: 2,630; Referees: Sreten Radović, Robert Lottermoser, Saulius Račys |

| 7 May 2026 Game 4 | Hapoel IBI Tel Aviv (Israeli Basketball Association) | 81–87 (Series: 1–3) | (Spanish Basketball Federation) Real Madrid | Botevgrad |
| 21:00 EEST | Scoring by quarter: 21–23, 15–23, 17–17, 28–24 |
| | Pts: Oturu 29; Rebs: Micić, Oturu 7 Asts: Micić 11; PIR: Micić, Oturu 34 | Boxscore | Pts: Garuba 16; Rebs: Garuba, Deck 6 Asts: Campazzo 7 PIR: Garuba 20 | Arena: Arena Botevgrad; Attendance: 2,200; Referees: Saša Pukl, Emin Moğulkoç, Oļegs Latiševs |

=== Fenerbahçe Beko vs. Žalgiris ===
| 28 April 2026 Game 1 | Fenerbahçe Beko (Turkish Basketball Federation) | 89–78 (Series: 1–0) | (Lithuanian Basketball Federation) Žalgiris | Istanbul |
| 20:45 TRT | Scoring by quarter: 22–20, 25–9, 18–28, 24–21 |
| | Pts: Biberović 26; Rebs: Melli, Baldwin 5 Asts: de Colo, Baldwin 4 PIR: Biberović, Baldwin 22 | Boxscore | Pts: Williams-Goss 24; Rebs: Wright 5 Asts: Williams-Goss, Francisco 6 PIR: Williams-Goss 24 | Arena: Ülker Sports and Event Hall; Attendance: 12,571; Referees: Carlos Peruga, Borys Ryzhyk, Thomas Bissuel |

| 30 April 2026 Game 2 | Fenerbahçe Beko (Turkish Basketball Federation) | 86–74 (Series: 2–0) | (Lithuanian Basketball Federation) Žalgiris | Istanbul |
| 20:45 TRT | Scoring by quarter: 26–14, 25–19, 15–14, 20–27 |
| | Pts: Melli 17; Rebs: Birch 7 Asts: Baldwin 7 PIR: Jantunen 23 | Boxscore | Pts: Tubelis, Wright 16; Rebs: four players 3 Asts: Francisco, Williams-Goss 6 PIR: Tubelis 19 | Arena: Ülker Sports and Event Hall; Attendance: 12,873; Referees: Miguel Ángel Pérez, Juan Carlos García, Miloš Koljenšić |

| 6 May 2026 Game 3 | Žalgiris (Lithuanian Basketball Federation) | 81–78 (Series: 1–2) | (Turkish Basketball Federation) Fenerbahçe Beko | Kaunas |
| 20:00 EEST | Scoring by quarter: 12–25, 23–17, 22–20, 24–16 |
| | Pts: Tubelis 26; Rebs: Francisco 7 Asts: Francisco 8 PIR: Tubelis 31 | Boxscore | Pts: Baldwin 16; Rebs: Melli 5 Asts: Baldwin 5 PIR: Baldwin 16 | Arena: Žalgirio Arena; Attendance: 14,792; Referees: Emilio Pérez, Mehdi Difallah, Sérgio Silva |

| 8 May 2026 Game 4 | Žalgiris (Lithuanian Basketball Federation) | 90–94(OT) (Series: 1–3) | (Turkish Basketball Federation) Fenerbahçe Beko | Kaunas |
| 20:00 EEST | Scoring by quarter: 20–25, 22–22, 20–14, 18–19, Overtime: 10–14 |
| | Pts: Francisco 23; Rebs: Wright 7 Asts: Francisco 11; PIR: Francisco 27 | Boxscore | Pts: Birch, Horton-Tucker 21; Rebs: Birch 13; Asts: Baldwin 5 PIR: Birch 31 | Arena: Žalgirio Arena; Attendance: 15,063; Referees: Ilija Belošević, Juan Carlos García, Carlos Cortés |
