= 2026 EuroLeague Final Four =

Basketball tournament in Athens

- Season: 2025–26 EuroLeague

Tournament details
- Arena: Telekom Center Athens; Athens, Greece
- Dates: 22–24 May 2026

Final positions
- Champions: (Hellenic Basketball Federation) Olympiacos (4th title)
- Runners-up: (Spanish Basketball Federation) Real Madrid

Awards and statistics
- MVP: (French Federation of Basketball) Evan Fournier
- Top scorer(s): (Croatia) Mario Hezonja (44 points)

The 2026 EuroLeague Final Four, officially EuroLeague Final Four Athens 2026 presented by Etihad due to the sponsorship reasons, was the concluding EuroLeague Final Four tournament of the 2025–26 EuroLeague season, the 69th season of Europe's premier club basketball tournament, and the 26th season since it was first organised by Euroleague Basketball. It was the 39th Final Four of the modern EuroLeague Final Four era (1988–present), and the 41st time overall that the competition has concluded with a final four format. Euroleague Basketball announced that the Final Four would be played at the Telekom Center in Athens, Greece, on 22–24 May 2026. This was the second Final Four to exclude a third place play-off match.

Olympiacos defeated Real Madrid 92-85 in the championship game, to secure their first EuroLeague title since 2013 and 4th overall. They also become the first-ever regular season top seed to secure the championship.

== Venue ==
On 10 September 2025, it was announced that the Final Four would be played at the Telekom Center in Athens, Greece, on 22–24 May 2026.

Athens	2026 EuroLeague Final Four (Europe)
Telekom Center Athens	2026 EuroLeague Final Four (Europe)
Capacity: 19,000	2026 EuroLeague Final Four (Europe)

== Teams ==
Team	Qualified date	Previous participations (bold indicates winners)
(Hellenic Basketball Federation) Olympiacos	5 May 2026	14 (1994, 1995, **1997**, 1999, 2009, 2010, **2012**, **2013**, 2015, 2017, 2022, 2023, 2024, 2025)
(Spanish Basketball Federation) Real Madrid	7 May 2026	14 (**1967**, 1993, **1995**, 1996, 2011, 2013, 2014, **2015**, 2017, **2018**, 2019, 2022, **2023**, 2024)
(Turkish Basketball Federation) Fenerbahçe Beko	8 May 2026	7 (2015, 2016, **2017**, 2018, 2019, 2024, **2025**)
(Spanish Basketball Federation) Valencia Basket	14 May 2026	0 (debut)

== Bracket ==
Semifinals; 22 May
**(Hellenic Basketball Federation) Olympiacos**	**79**
(Turkish Basketball Federation) Fenerbahçe Beko	61
(Spanish Basketball Federation) Valencia Basket	90
**(Spanish Basketball Federation) Real Madrid**	**105**

Championship game 24 May
**(Hellenic Basketball Federation) Olympiacos**	**92**
(Spanish Basketball Federation) Real Madrid	85

== Semifinals ==
=== Semifinal A ===
22 May 2026	**Olympiacos** (Hellenic Basketball Federation)	**79**–61	(Turkish Basketball Federation) Fenerbahçe Beko	Marousi, Greece
17:00 (CEST)	Scoring by quarter: **18**−12, **15**−12, **23**−17, **23**−20
	Pts: Peters 17; Rebs: Milutinov 13; Asts: Walkup 5 PIR: Milutinov 18	Boxscore	Pts: Biberović 17; Rebs: Horton-Tucker 7 Asts: Baldwin 6 PIR: Horton-Tucker 23	Arena: Telekom Center Athens; Referees: Sreten Radović, Carlos Peruga, Milan Nedović

Starters:			Pts	Reb	Ast
PG	0	(Greece) Thomas Walkup	2	5	5
SG	22	(Greece) Tyler Dorsey	15	3	1
SF	16	(Greece) Kostas Papanikolaou	0	2	1
PF	14	(Bulgaria) Sasha Vezenkov	16	5	1
C	33	(Serbia) Nikola Milutinov	6	13	0
Reserves:					
SF	3	(United States) Tyson Ward	10	3	2
PF	25	(United States) Alec Peters	17	2	1
PG	34	(Canada) Cory Joseph	0	0	0
C	45	(Azerbaijan) Donta Hall	0	0	0
SF	77	(United States) Shaquielle McKissic	1	0	1
C	88	(United States) Tyrique Jones	2	2	0
SG	94	(France) Evan Fournier	10	4	4
Head coach:
(Hellenic Basketball Federation) Georgios Bartzokas

**Olympiacos**	**Fenerbahçe**

Olympiacos	Statistics	Fenerbahçe
17/32 (53.1%)	2-pt field goals	13/26 (50.0%)
11/27 (40.7%)	3-pt field goals	8/36 (22.2%)
12/20 (60.0%)	Free throws	11/15 (73.3%)
7	Offensive rebounds	8
36	Defensive rebounds	26
43	Total rebounds	34
16	Assists	14
9	Turnovers	9
3	Steals	5
0	Blocks	3
19	Fouls	21

Starters:			Pts	Reb	Ast
G	20	(United States) Devon Hall	0	2	0
SG	8	(United States) Talen Horton-Tucker	16	7	3
SF	13	(Turkey) Tarik Biberović	17	6	1
F/C	4	(Italy) Nicolò Melli	7	4	2
C	92	(Canada) Khem Birch	3	4	0
Reserves:					
PG	2	(United States) Wade Baldwin	10	5	6
SG	11	(United States) Brandon Boston	DNP		
G	12	(France) Nando de Colo	6	1	1
SF	17	(Turkey) Onuralp Bitim	0	0	0
PF	18	(Finland) Mikael Jantunen	0	0	1
C	30	(Gabon) Chris Silva	2	1	0
SF	50	(United States) Bonzie Colson	0	1	0
Head coach:
(Lithuanian Basketball Federation) Šarūnas Jasikevičius

=== Semifinal B ===
22 May 2026	Valencia Basket (Spanish Basketball Federation)	90–**105**	(Spanish Basketball Federation) **Real Madrid**	Marousi, Greece
20:00 (CEST)	Scoring by quarter: **28**−26, 28−**36**, 17−**24**, 17−**19**
	Pts: three players 15; Rebs: Pradilla 8 Asts: Montero 9 PIR: Pradilla 23	Boxscore	Pts: Hezonja 25; Rebs: Deck, Feliz 8 Asts: Campazzo 8 PIR: Hezonja 33	Arena: Telekom Center Athens; Referees: Robert Lottermoser, Mehdi Difallah, Oļegs Latiševs

Starters:			Pts	Reb	Ast
PG	8	(Dominican Republic) Jean Montero	15	2	9
SG	0	(Senegal) Brancou Badio	6	2	1
SF	1	(United States) Kameron Taylor	11	6	4
PF	4	(Spain) Jaime Pradilla	15	8	1
C	3	(Hungary) Nate Reuvers	15	0	0
Reserves:					
PG	5	(Spain) Sergio de Larrea	3	1	2
F	7	(United States) Braxton Key	13	5	3
SG	10	(North Macedonia) Omari Moore	0	1	2
C	12	(France) Neal Sako	6	4	0
G	13	(Italy) Darius Thompson	3	1	1
C	24	(Ivory Coast) Matt Costello	3	1	0
SF	32	(Spain) Isaac Nogués	DNP		
Head coach:
(Spanish Basketball Federation) Pedro Martínez

**Valencia**	**Real Madrid**

Valencia	Statistics	Real Madrid
27/44 (61.4%)	2-pt field goals	21/43 (48.8%)
10/29 (34.5%)	3-pt field goals	14/34 (41.2%)
6/9 (66.7%)	Free throws	21/25 (84.0%)
9	Offensive rebounds	19
22	Defensive rebounds	29
31	Total rebounds	48
23	Assists	23
9	Turnovers	9
5	Steals	3
5	Blocks	2
21	Fouls	18

Starters:			Pts	Reb	Ast
PG	7	(Argentina) Facundo Campazzo	8	0	8
SG	6	(Spain) Alberto Abalde	5	3	2
SF	11	(Croatia) Mario Hezonja	25	7	3
PF	8	(United States) Chuma Okeke	5	4	0
C	16	(Spain) Usman Garuba	2	5	1
Reserves:					
F/C	0	(Canada) Trey Lyles	17	7	1
SF	9	(Italy) Gabriele Procida	0	0	0
PG	12	(France) Théo Maledon	12	3	3
F/C	13	(Spain) Izan Almansa	0	0	0
PF	14	(Argentina) Gabriel Deck	16	8	2
SG	23	(Spain) Sergio Llull	0	0	0
G	24	(Dominican Republic) Andrés Feliz	15	8	3
Head coach:
(Italian Basketball Federation) Sergio Scariolo

== Championship game ==
24 May 2026	**Olympiacos** (Hellenic Basketball Federation)	**92**–85	(Spanish Basketball Federation) Real Madrid	Marousi, Greece
20:00 (CEST)	Scoring by quarter: 19–**26**, **27**–18, 15–**21**, **31**–20
	Pts: Fournier 20; Rebs: Milutinov 8 Asts: Joseph 5 PIR: Peters 26	Boxscore	Pts: Lyles 24; Rebs: Lyles 8 Asts: Campazzo 6 PIR: Lyles 30	Arena: Telekom Center Athens; Referees: Sreten Radović, Robert Lottermoser, Oļegs Latiševs

Starters:			Pts	Reb	Ast
PG	0	(Greece) Thomas Walkup	10	2	2
SG	22	(Greece) Tyler Dorsey	1	1	0
SF	16	(Greece) Kostas Papanikolaou	0	0	0
PF	14	(Bulgaria) Sasha Vezenkov	12	4	0
C	33	(Serbia) Nikola Milutinov	8	8	1
Reserves:					
SF	3	(United States) Tyson Ward	7	1	1
PF	25	(United States) Alec Peters	16	7	2
PG	34	(Canada) Cory Joseph	5	3	5
C	45	(Azerbaijan) Donta Hall	4	6	0
SF	77	(United States) Shaquielle McKissic	5	2	1
C	88	(United States) Tyrique Jones	4	1	0
SG	94	(France) Evan Fournier	20	5	4
Head coach:
(Hellenic Basketball Federation) Georgios Bartzokas

**Olympiacos**	**Real Madrid**

Olympiacos	Statistics	Real Madrid
20/38 (52.6%)	2-pt field goals	17/29 (58.6%)
10/20 (50.0%)	3-pt field goals	13/35 (37.1%)
22/27 (81.5%)	Free throws	12/18 (66.7%)
12	Offensive rebounds	7
30	Defensive rebounds	19
42	Total rebounds	26
16	Assists	18
17	Turnovers	9
3	Steals	11
1	Blocks	3
23	Fouls	27

2025–26 EuroLeague champions

**Olympiacos**
(4th title)

Starters:			Pts	Reb	Ast
PG	7	(Argentina) Facundo Campazzo	5	1	6
SG	6	(Spain) Alberto Abalde	9	2	1
SF	11	(Croatia) Mario Hezonja	19	4	5
PF	8	(United States) Chuma Okeke	0	4	2
F/C	0	(Canada) Trey Lyles	24	8	1
Reserves:					
SG	1	(Germany) David Krämer	DNP		
SF	9	(Italy) Gabriele Procida	DNP		
PG	12	(France) Théo Maledon	8	2	1
F/C	13	(Spain) Izan Almansa	DNP		
PF	14	(Argentina) Gabriel Deck	4	2	0
SG	23	(Spain) Sergio Llull	3	0	1
G	24	(Dominican Republic) Andrés Feliz	13	3	1
Head coach:
(Italian Basketball Federation) Sergio Scariolo
