= Damir Javor =

Slovenian basketball referee (born 1974)

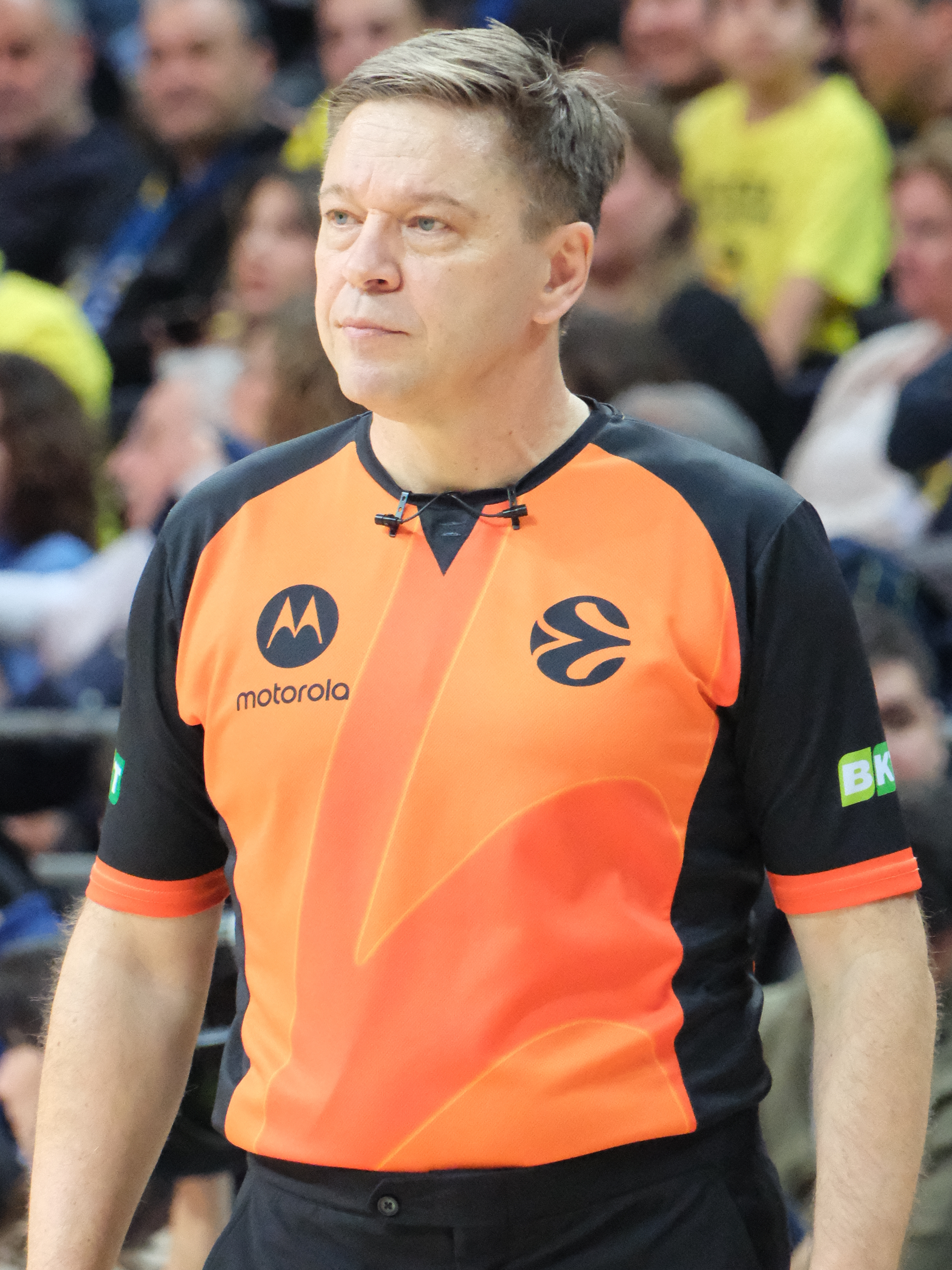
- Damir Javor in 2026

Personal information
- Born: March 3, 1974 (age 52) Ljubljana, Slovenia

Career information
- Position: Referee
- Officiating career: 1995–present

Career highlights
- Appointed FIBA referee (2006–present); EuroLeague referee (2009–present)

Damir Javor (Ljubljana, 3 March 1974) is a Slovenian professional basketball referee, who has been a FIBA international referee since 2006 and is regarded as one of the top European officials of his generation.

== Refereeing career ==
He began officiating professionally in Slovenia in 1995 and became a licensed international referee with FIBA in 2006. Since 2009, he has also been a regular referee in the EuroLeague.

Over the years, he has officiated in major FIBA events including the FIBA Basketball World Cup, EuroBasket, Olympic Games in Rio 2016 and various Olympic qualifying tournaments.

He joined the EuroLeague officiating crew in 2009, and has been selected for numerous high-stakes matches including the Euroleague playoffs. He has been selected to officiate in the Euroleague Final Four games in the years 2016, 2022 and 2024, while in 2016 he was the referee of the final game of the Final Four, along with Luigi Lamonica and Robert Lottermoser.
