= Milan Nedović =

Slovenian basketball referee (born 1988)

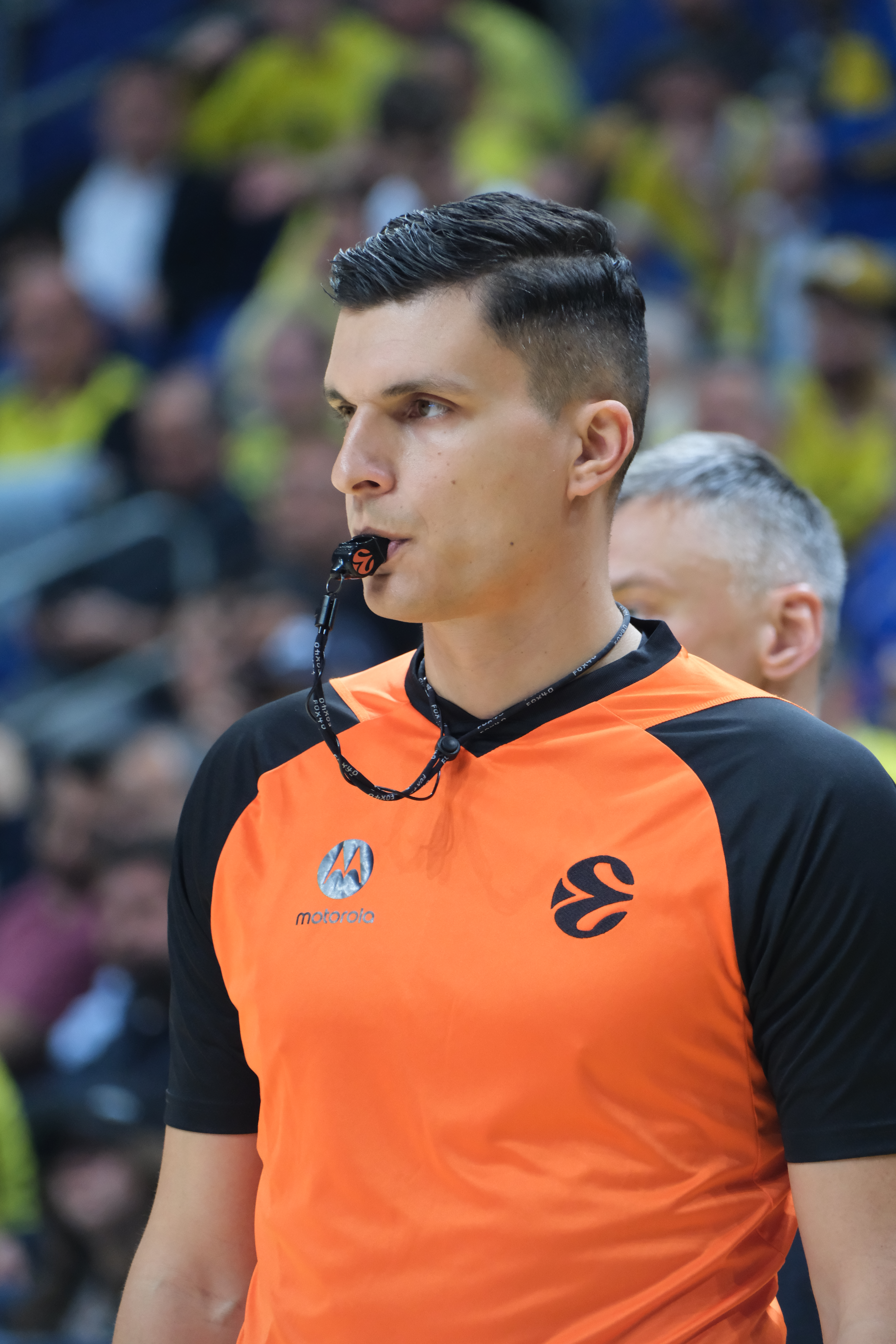
- Nedović officiating in EuroLeague competition

Personal information
- Born: August 5, 1988 (age 38) Slovenia
- Position: Referee

Career highlights
- EuroLeague referee since 2017; Officiated in EuroCup and ABA League competitions; Selected for the 2025 EuroLeague Final Four; Officiated the 2025 EuroLeague Championship Game; Multiple EuroLeague playoff assignments

Milan Nedović (born 5 August 1988) is a Slovenian professional basketball referee who officiates in the EuroLeague, EuroCup, and ABA League. He has emerged as one of the younger referees in European basketball, earning appointments to key EuroLeague playoff games and two of the EuroLeague Final Fours.

== Refereeing career ==
Nedović developed through the Slovenian basketball officiating system under the Basketball Federation of Slovenia. He later became an official in the ABA League before joining the EuroLeague Basketball officiating roster during the 2017–18 season.

His early EuroCup and EuroLeague appointments included games during the 2017–18 and 2018–19 seasons. Since 2020, he has been regularly officiating EuroLeague regular-season games, and also in Final Four tournaments.

In May 2025, Nedović was selected for the 2025 EuroLeague Final Four in Abu Dhabi, marking his first Final Four appointment, and he later officiated the championship game of the tournament between AS Monaco and Fenerbahce.

In May 2026, Nedović was also selected for the EuroLeague Final Four held in Athens -at his second consecutive appearance- and officiated in the first semifinal game of the 2026 Final Four, between Olympiacos Piraeus and Fenerbahce Beko Istanbul.

== Selected notable assignments ==
- 2025 EuroLeague Final Four
- 2026 EuroLeague Final Four
- EuroLeague Playoffs (2025–present)
- ABA League playoff games
