= Allan Dokossi =

Central African basketball player

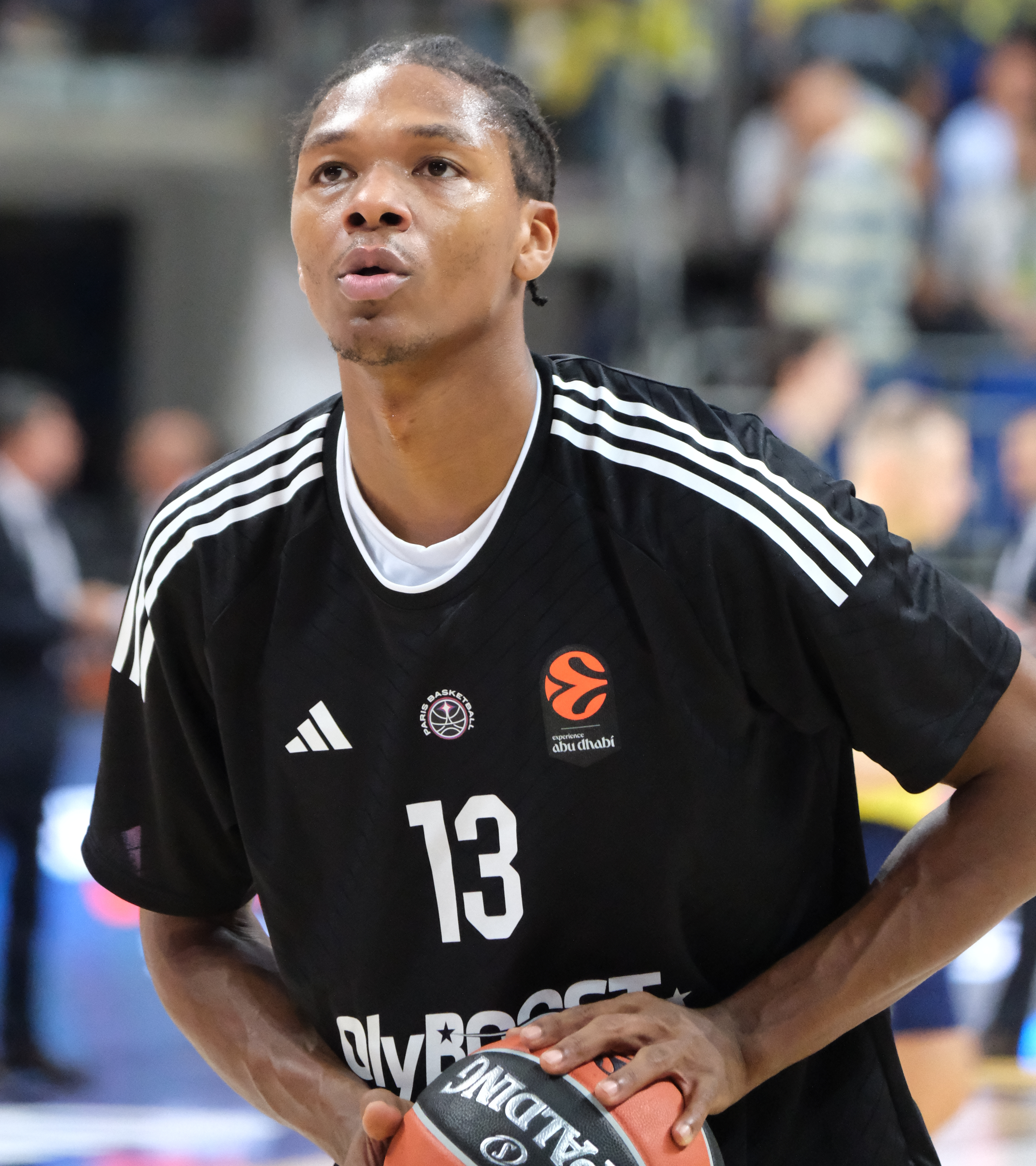
- Dokossi with Paris Basketball in 2025

No. 13 – Paris Basketball
- Position: Center
- League: LNB Pro A EuroLeague

Personal information
- Born: 14 December 1999 (age 26) Paris, France
- Listed height: 2.03 m (6 ft 8 in)
- Listed weight: 213 lb (97 kg)

Career information
- Playing career: 2017–present

Career history
- 2018–2023: Fos Provence Basket
- 2023–2025: JDA Dijon
- 2025–present: Paris Basketball

Allan Julien Dokossi (born 14 October 1999) is a French-Central African professional basketball player for Paris Basketball of the LNB Pro A and the EuroLeague, and also the Central African Republic national team. He plays at the center position.

== Professional career ==
During the 2018–19 season, Allan Dokossi played for Fos Provence Basket as part of its LNB Pro A under-21 team. There, he averaged around 14 points and 11 rebounds. These numbers guaranteed him his first games for the club's first team.

At the start of the 2020-21 LNB Pro B season, management at Fos Provence Basket was not certain whether Dokossi would make its prime squad. Hence, they equipped him with a double license with the Sorgues-Avignon club of the Nationale 1 where he played two games before returning to his main team. As of late December 2020, Dokossi averaged 8 points and 6.7 rebounds in three LNB Pro B league games, and 11 points and 7.9 rebounds in seven LNB Pro A Leaders Cup matches.

On 30 June 2023 he signed with JDA Dijon of the LNB Pro A.

On 1 July 2025 he signed with Paris Basketball of the LNB Pro A.

== National team ==
Dokossi has been a member of the Central African Republic national basketball team.

== Player profile ==
Dokossi is left handed and plays both Forward positions. (Small forward and power forward). His team's general manager and former player Julien Monclar stated that he values Dokossi's athleticism. In early 2021, his team's head coach Rémi Giuitta added that Dokossi impresses through his rebounding, defense and self-discipline.
