= Saša Pukl =

Slovenian basketball referee

- Sasa Pukl in 2026
- Born: October 25, 1970 (age 56); Maribor, Slovenia

Saša Pukl (25 October 1970, Maribor) is a Slovenian professional basketball referee and an international official licensed by the FIBA since the mid-1990s, widely regarded as one of the most experienced European referees in the Euroleague.

== Career ==
Pukl began refereeing at a young age and entered professional officiating in Slovenia in the 1990s.

He became a FIBA-licensed referee in 1995 and has since served in major international competitions over more than two decades.

Pukl's career spans domestic, regional and global competitions:

- He has been a recurring official at the EuroLeague, including six assignments at the Final Four stage.
- In the ABA League, Pukl has officiated for over twenty years.
- He has also been selected for high-profile assignments in continental championships and finals, including key matches in EuroCup competition.
- Pukl officiated at the 2012 Summer Olympics basketball tournament.

== Notable games ==
Pukl has been involved in high-pressure and widely reported situations:

- During a Liga ABA final game in Belgrade, Pukl made the decision to clear the arena due to fan disturbances — a rare measure reflecting strict enforcement of game control and safety standards.
- He has been at the center of intense on-court reactions, including technical fouls on notable players during EuroLeague contests.

== EuroLeague Final Four appearances ==
Pukl has officiated in the following EuroLeague Final Four tournaments:

- 2007 EuroLeague Final Four – Officiated at the 2007 Final Four in Athens, Greece.
- 2015 EuroLeague Final Four – Served as one of the referees during the 2015 Final Four in Madrid, Spain.
- 2019 EuroLeague Final Four – Assigned as a referee at the 2019 Final Four in Vitoria-Gasteiz, Spain.
- 2021 EuroLeague Final Four – Officiated at the 2021 Final Four in Cologne, Germany.
- 2022 EuroLeague Final Four – Selected among the officiating crew for the 2022 Final Four.
- 2023 EuroLeague Final Four – Took part in the 2023 Final Four in Kaunas, Lithuania.
