= Carlos Peruga =

Spanish basketball referee (born 1976)

- Peruga officiating a EuroLeague game in 2024

Personal information
- Born: August 15, 1976 (age 50) Zaragoza, Spain

Career information
- Position: Referee
- Officiating career: 1994–present

Career highlights
- Appointed FIBA referee (2004–present); Officiated at the 2016 Summer Olympics; Officiated the 2018 Copa del Rey final; EuroLeague referee since 2004; Selected for the 2025 EuroLeague Final Four

Carlos Peruga (full name: Carlos Francisco Peruga Embid; born 15 August 1976) is a Spanish professional basketball referee.

He has been a FIBA international referee since 2004 and has officiated in major international competitions, including the Olympic Games. Peruga is a veteran EuroLeague referee, having officiated numerous high-profile games and was selected for the 2025 EuroLeague Final Four.

== Refereeing career ==
Peruga began his refereeing career in Spain in 1994, progressing through various regional divisions—3ª División Aragonesa, 2ª División Aragonesa, 1ª División Aragonesa, Liga EBA, Liga LEB—before reaching the top-tier Liga ACB in 2001. He assumed roles such as President of the Aragonese Referees Committee and later became Director of Refereeing at the Aragonese Basketball Federation, holding a second-level coaching title.

In April 2012, Peruga earned his FIBA International status after completing the refereeing clinic in Mannheim, Germany, where he also officiated a match for the junior bronze medal game.

By 2019, he had officiated 500 Liga Endesa games, and in 2022, reached 600 ACB matches, reflecting his long-standing presence at the elite level. Most recently, in June 2025, he achieved refereeing over 700 ACB games, celebrated modestly during the playoff season.

His Olympic assignment includes the 2016 Rio de Janeiro Games, where he officiated the women's bronze-medal match between France and Serbia.

In the EuroLeague, Peruga has been a fixture since 2004. Notably, he was the only Spanish referee selected for the 2024 Final Four in Berlin, and subsequently nominated for 2025 in Abu Dhabi.
