= Oļegs Latiševs =

Latvian basketball referee (born 1980)

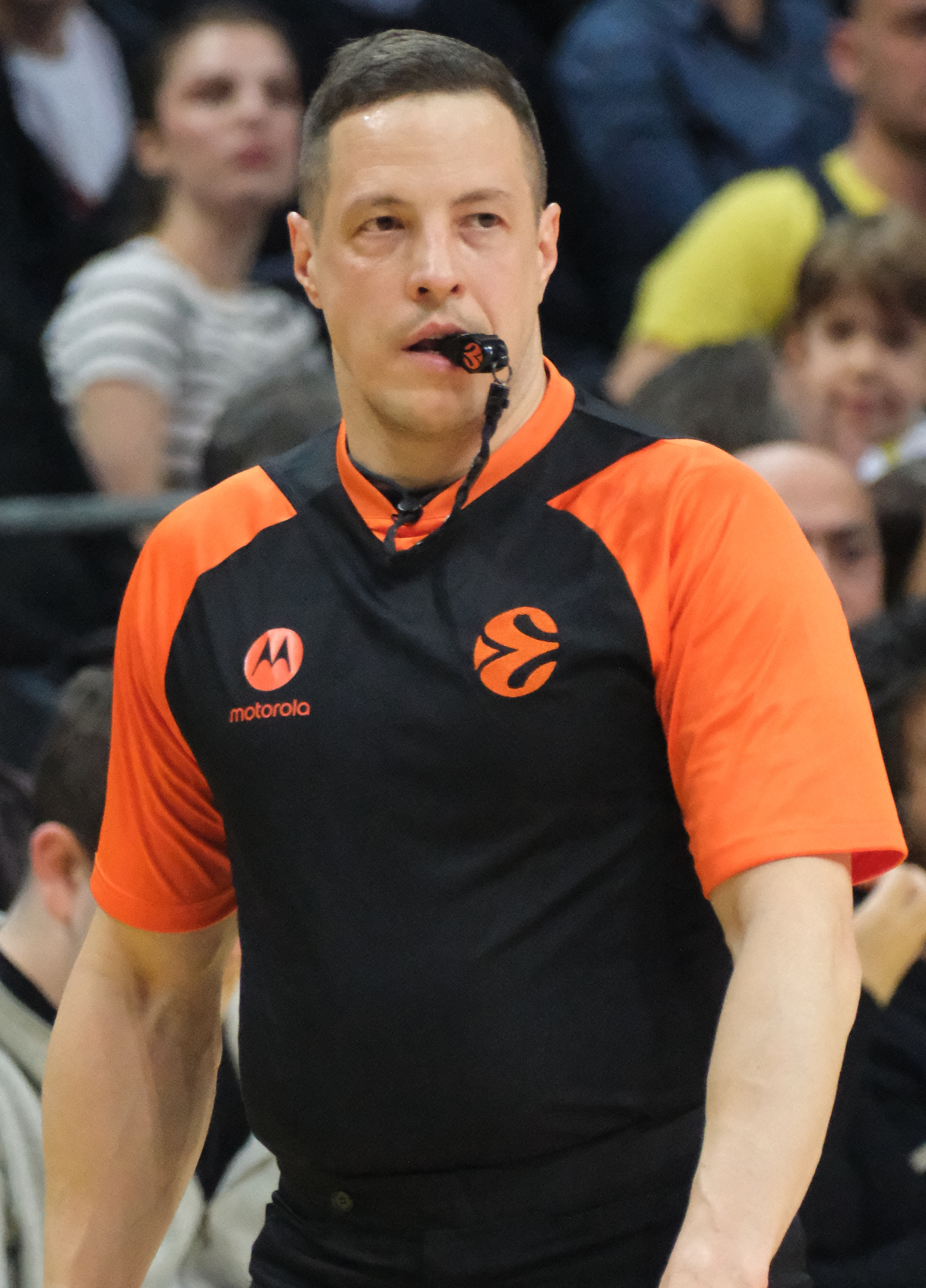

Personal information
- Born: 1 June 1980 (age 46) Riga, Latvia
- Education: MBA in Macroeconomics from Latvian University
- Height: 5 ft 6 in (168 cm)
- Weight: 157 lb (71 kg; 11 st 3 lb)
- Basketball career
- Position: Latvijas Basketbola Līga referee (2000–present); FIBA referee (2003–present); EuroLeague referee (2007–present)
- Officiating career: 2000–present

Oļegs Latiševs (born 1 June 1980), is a Latvian FIBA basketball referee. His cooperation with FIBA started in 2003 and with Euroleague in 2007.

Latisevs started to work as a referee already at the age of 15 (1995), when he was awarded the referee licence and was invited as a referee to the Championship of Latvian Youth Basketball League. After five seasons (2000), he was awarded National referee category, becoming the referee of the Latvian Major Basketball League. He was awarded FIBA Basketball referee licence at the age of 23 (2003). Starting from 2004 he was regularly invited as a referee to key European and International Championships. The presence of Latisevs was requested at all EuroBasket Competitions starting from 2005. He also participated in two FIBA Basketball World Cups and nine seasons of Euroleague, in five of which he took part as a referee for final four.

In 2012 and 2016 Latisevs refereed for the Olympic Games. In total, Latisevs led more than 450 Basketball matches organised by FIBA and Euroleague.

== Referee career ==
Latisevs has taken part as a referee in more than 1,300 matches, which he was refereeing during National, European and International Championships. His record of accomplishment includes servicing the most important Championships between the National Teams (the Olympic Games, FIBA Basketball World Cup, EuroBasket, European Basketball Championship (U16/ U18/ U20), World Cup U19) and Professional Club Championships (Euroleague, ULEB Eurocup, VTB United League, Baltic Basketball League, Latvian Basketball League).

Starting from 2000, Latisevs serviced all Latvian Basketball League Championships, in total, leading more than 500 matches. In the same year, Latisevs was invited as a referee to Baltic Basketball League, where in total he serviced more than 300 matches. He has also been the long-term referee for VTB United League, while participating mainly in the finals.

== Cooperation with FIBA Europe ==
The cooperative work with FIBA Europe started in 2003 with the fourth tier European Championship (in accordance to the European professional club basketball system classification), in particular FIBA EuroCup Challenge. The League in which National teams took part was established in 2002 and terminated in 2006.

He also serviced matches in other subordinated to FIBA Europe Championships, in total having worked at 267 matches organised by FIBA Europe.

In 2003/2004 Latisevs was invited to Europe Championship for young men in the age category under 16. As a result, he became the permanent Europe Championship referee for young men in the age categories under 16, under 18, under 20.

Already in 2005 Latisevs was regularly invited as a referee to Europe Basketball Championship (Eurobasket) that took place once in two years among european teams that have qualified for FIBA Basketball World Cup and the Olympic Games.

== Cooperation with Euroleague ==
After the end of four season work with FIBA Europe in 2007/2008 Latisevs was invited to the first tier Championships (Euroleague) and second tier European Transnational Championships (Basketball Eurocup, known also as ULEB Eurocup). The organiser and the operator of these Championships for state-members of FIBA Europe is Euroleague. Already during the third season of the work with Euroleague, Latisevs was delegated as referee to Euroleague final four.

During his refereeing career, Latisevs serviced six Euroleague final fours, including that of 2026 in Athens.

== Cooperation with NBA ==
Latisevs has an experience in the work in NBA Championships. In 2013 Latisevs serviced the matches of Summer NBA League in Las Vegas, USA. This event was organised in the framework of educational programme for FIBA referees, the aim of which was to share experience between the best FIBA referees from Europe, Asia, Oceania and the leading USA referees. In 2015 he participated as a referee in NBA Global Games.

== Career achievements ==
The highlight of Latisevs’ career is the participation in FIBA Basketball World Cup, the leading event in the International Basketball Federation. Latisevs serviced FIBA Basketball World Cup in 2010 and 2014.

Latisevs has also taken part in the Olympic Games. In the history of independent Latvia, it was the first time when the referee from this state was invited to the Olympic Games. During the 2012 Olympic Games Latisevs serviced seven games, including quarter-final match of women Championship Australia – China. In the 2016 Olympic Games in Rio de Janeiro, Latisevs has refereed nine games, including the men's semifinal game Australia – Serbia.

In May 2026, he officiated the Euroleague Final Four championship game between Olympiakos and Real Madrid, held in Athens.

== Social activity ==
In 2007 Latisevs chaired Referee Committee of Latvian Basketball Federation.

Apart from this Latisevs regularly organises seminars for young referees that are devoted to the art of verbal and non-verbal communication on the court, the self-presentation and the right physical and moral preparation for Championships
