= Robert Lottermoser =

German basketball referee (born 1976)

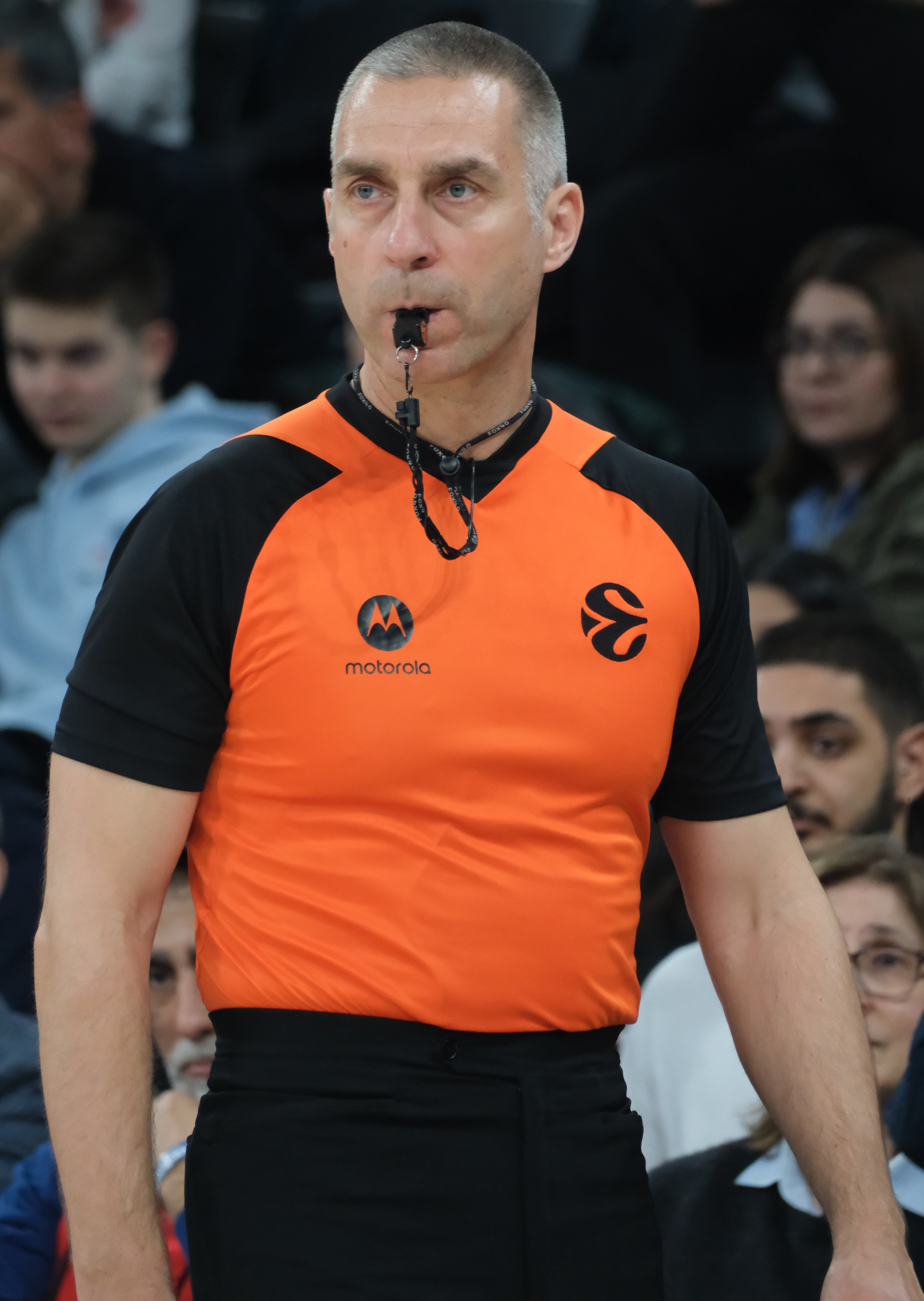
- Robert Lottermoser in 2025

Personal information
- Born: June 3, 1976 (age 50) Bernau bei Berlin, Germany

Career information
- Position: Referee
- Officiating career: 1994–present

Career highlights
- Appointed FIBA referee (2004–present); Officiated at the 2012 and 2016 Summer Olympics; Officiated at multiple FIBA EuroBaskets and World Cups; EuroLeague referee since 2004; 10× EuroLeague Final Four official (as of May 2025)

Robert Lottermoser (Bernau bei Berlin, Germany, 3 June 1976) is a German professional basketball referee, who has been selected ten times to officiate in EuroLeague Final Four tournaments.

He has been a FIBA international referee since 2004 and has officiated in major international competitions, including the Olympic Games, FIBA World Cups, and EuroBasket tournaments. Lottermoser is also a EuroLeague referee, having officiated over 400 games and ten Final Fours including that of 2025.

== Refereeing career ==
Lottermoser began his refereeing career in Germany in 1994, after obtaining his A-license from the German Basketball Federation at the age of 18. He became a FIBA-certified referee in 2004 and has since officiated in numerous international competitions.

His Olympic assignments include the 2012 London Games, where he officiated several men's and women's basketball games, and the 2016 Rio de Janeiro Games, including the men's semifinal between Serbia and Australia.

In the EuroLeague, Lottermoser has been selected for ten EuroLeague Final Fours. In May 2026, he officiated the Euroleague championship game between Olympiakos and Real Madrid, held in Athens.
