= 2025–26 Fenerbahçe S.K. (basketball) season =

112th season

Fenerbahçe Beko
2025–26 season
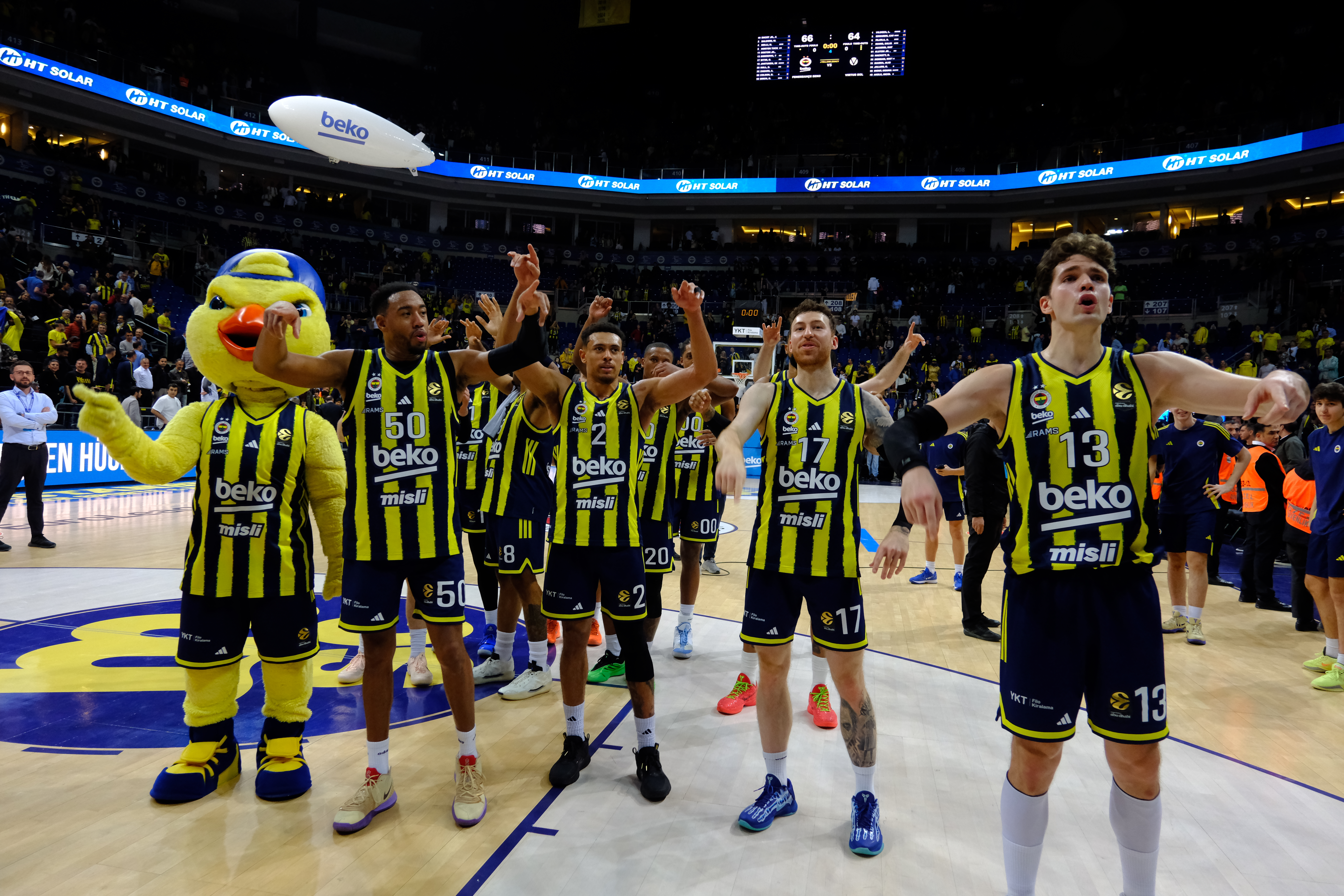
- President: Ali Koç (until 25 September); Sadettin Saran (from 25 September to 10 June); Aziz Yıldırım (from 10 June)
- Head coach: Šarūnas Jasikevičius
- Arena: Ülker Sports and Event Hall
- Basketbol Süper Ligi: 1st seed
- Playoffs: Champions
- EuroLeague: 4th seed
- Playoffs: Semifinals
- Presidential Cup: Champions
- Turkish Basketball Cup: Champions

The 2025–26 season was Fenerbahçe's 112th season in the existence of the club. The team played in the Basketbol Süper Ligi and in the EuroLeague.

== Club ==
=== Board of directors ===
| Position | Staff |
|---|---|
| Chairman | (Turkey) Sadettin Saran |
| Deputy Chairman | (Turkey) Murat Salar |
| General Secretary | (Turkey) Orhan Demirel |
| Board Member | (Turkey) Adem Köz |
| Board Member | (Turkey) Taner Sönmezer |
| Board Member | (Turkey) Ahmet Murat Emanetoğlu |
| Board Member | (Turkey) İlker Alkun |
| Board Member | (Turkey) Burçin Gözlüklü |
| Board Member | (Turkey) Ali Gürbüz |
| Board Member | (Turkey) Ertan Torunoğulları |
| Board Member | (Turkey) Ufuk Şansal |
| Board Member | (Turkey) Olcay Doğan |
| Board Member | (Turkey) Cem Ciritci |
| Board Member | (Turkey) Erdem Sezer |
| Board Member | (Turkey) Ozan Vural |
| Board Member | (Turkey) Ertuğrul Eren Ergen |
| Board Member | (Turkey) İlyas Yılmaz |
| Board Member | (Turkey) Orkan Orakçıoğlu |
| Board Member | (Turkey) Gürhan Taşkaya |
| Board Member | (Turkey) İlker Arslan |
| Board Member | (Turkey) Zeynep Yalım Uzun |
| Board Member | (Turkey) Serhan Yılmaz |

Last updated: 25 September 2025
Source: Fenerbahce.org

=== Staff ===
| Position | Staff |
|---|---|
| Head Coach | (Lithuania) Šarūnas Jasikevičius |
| General Manager | (Turkey) Derya Yannier |
| Team Manager | (Turkey) Cenk Renda |
| Sporting Director | (Turkey) Uğur Ozan Sulak |
| Director of Basketball Operations | (Turkey) Defne Patır |
| Director of Administration and Media | (Turkey) İlker Üçer |
| Director of Business Development | (Turkey) Mert Ahmet Gündüz |
| Ticketing Director | (Turkey) Evren Gençoğlu |
| Digital Media Manager | (Turkey) Gökhan Deniz |
| Finance Manager | (Turkey) Murat Gök |
| Ticketing Officer | (Turkey) Kaan Can Değerli |
| Marketing and Game Operations Officer | (Turkey) Abdullah Işık |
| Communications and Marketing Officer | (Turkey) Ece Yenibayrak |
| Administrative Officer | (Turkey) Hüseyin Kasarcı |
| Assistant Coach | (Lithuania) Kazys Maksvytis |
| Assistant Coach | (Spain) David Garcia |
| Assistant Coach | (Turkey) Ertuğrul Erdoğan |
| Assistant Coach | (Turkey) Alp Timuçin Yener |
| Doctor | (Turkey) Ogün Köyağasıoğlu |
| Dietitian | (Turkey) Şengül Sangu Talak |
| Conditioner | (Lithuania) Mantas Valčiukaitis |
| Conditioner | (Turkey) İlker Belgutay |
| Physiotherapist | (Turkey) Rıza Özdemir |
| Physiotherapist | (Spain) Jaime Capellá Bouza |
| Physiotherapist | (Turkey) Ebru Kaplan |
| Masseur | (Turkey) Yılmaz Mete |
| Masseur | (Turkey) Faik Özköksal |
| Equipment Manager | (Turkey) Erkan Karaca |

Last updated: 25 September 2025
Source: Fenerbahce.org

== Players ==
=== Squad information ===
Note: Flags indicate national team eligibility at FIBA-sanctioned events. Players may hold other non-FIBA nationalities not displayed.

Fenerbahçe Beko roster
Players
Coaches

| Pos. | No. | Nat. | Name | Ht. | Wt. | Age |
|---|---|---|---|---|---|---|
| F/C | 00 | (United States) | Bacot, Armando | 2.08 m (6 ft 10 in) | 109 kg (240 lb) | 26 – 6 March 2000 |
| F | 1 | (Turkey) (Republic of Ireland) | Birsen, Metecan | 2.08 m (6 ft 10 in) | 101 kg (223 lb) | 31 – 6 April 1995 |
| G | 2 | (United States) | Baldwin IV, Wade | 1.92 m (6 ft 4 in) | 91 kg (201 lb) | 30 – 29 March 1996 |
| F/C | 4 | (Italy) | Melli, Nicolò | 2.05 m (6 ft 9 in) | 110 kg (243 lb) | 35 – 26 January 1991 |
| PG | 5 | (Turkey) | Ekşioğlu, Mert Emre | 1.88 m (6 ft 2 in) | | 24 – 2 January 2002 |
| G/F | 8 | (United States) | Horton-Tucker, Talen | 1.92 m (6 ft 4 in) | 106 kg (234 lb) | 25 – 25 November 2000 |
| G | 10 | (Turkey) | Mahmutoğlu, Melih (C) | 1.91 m (6 ft 3 in) | 85 kg (187 lb) | 36 – 12 May 1990 |
| SG | 11 | (United States) | Boston Jr., Brandon | 2.01 m (6 ft 7 in) | 85 kg (187 lb) | 24 – 28 November 2001 |
| G | 12 | (France) | de Colo, Nando | 1.97 m (6 ft 6 in) | 91 kg (201 lb) | 38 – 23 June 1987 |
| F | 13 | (Bosnia and Herzegovina) (Turkey) | Biberović, Tarik | 2.01 m (6 ft 7 in) | 100 kg (220 lb) | 25 – 28 January 2001 |
| G/F | 17 | (Turkey) | Bitim, Onuralp | 1.96 m (6 ft 5 in) | 98 kg (216 lb) | 27 – 31 March 1999 |
| F | 18 | (Finland) | Jantunen, Mikael | 2.04 m (6 ft 8 in) | 100 kg (220 lb) | 26 – 20 April 2000 |
| G | 20 | (United States) | Hall, Devon | 1.97 m (6 ft 6 in) | 86 kg (190 lb) | 30 – 7 July 1995 |
| SF | 22 | (Turkey) | Mestoğlu, Yiğit Hamza | 2.02 m (6 ft 8 in) | 93 kg (205 lb) | 22 – 22 April 2004 |
| PF | 30 | (Gabon) | Silva, Chris | 2.06 m (6 ft 9 in) | 106 kg (234 lb) | 29 – 19 September 1996 |
| PG | 32 | (Latvia) | Žagars, Artūrs | 1.90 m (6 ft 3 in) | 78 kg (172 lb) | 26 – 21 April 2000 |
| F | 44 | (Angola) | Bango, Jilson (injured) | 2.08 m (6 ft 10 in) | 94 kg (207 lb) | 27 – 6 January 1999 |
| F | 50 | (United States) | Colson, Bonzie | 1.97 m (6 ft 6 in) | 102 kg (225 lb) | 30 – 12 January 1996 |
| PF | 92 | (Canada) | Birch, Khem | 2.05 m (6 ft 9 in) | 106 kg (234 lb) | 33 – 28 September 1992 |

Head coach

- (Lithuania) Šarūnas Jasikevičius

Assistant coach(es)

- (Turkey) Ertuğrul Erdoğan
- (Lithuania) Kazys Maksvytis
- (Spain) David Garcia
- (Turkey) Alp Timuçin Yener

Athletic trainer(s)

- (Lithuania) Mantas Valčiukaitis
- (Turkey) İlker Belgutay

Physiotherapist(s)

- (Turkey) Rıza Özdemir
- (Spain) Jaime Capellá Bouza
- (Turkey) Ebru Kaplan

Team manager

- (Turkey) Cenk Renda

Legend

- (C) Team captain
- (DC) Dual citizenship
- Injured

- Roster
Updated: 19 June 2026

=== Depth chart ===
| Pos. | Starting 5 | Bench 1 | Bench 2 | Bench 3 | Inactive |
|---|---|---|---|---|---|
| C | Khem Birch | Chris Silva | | Armando Bacot | Jilson Bango (injured) |
| PF | Nicolò Melli | Mikael Jantunen | | Metecan Birsen |
| SF | Tarik Biberović | Bonzie Colson | Onuralp Bitim | | Yiğit Hamza Mestoğlu |
| SG | Talen Horton-Tucker | Nando de Colo | Brandon Boston Jr. | Melih Mahmutoğlu | Mert Emre Ekşioğlu |
| PG | Devon Hall | Wade Baldwin IV | | Artūrs Žagars |

=== Transactions ===
==== In ====
| No. | Pos. | Nat. | Name | Age | Moving from | | Ends | Date | Source |
|---|---|---|---|---|---|---|---|---|---|
| 18 | PF | (Finland) | Mikael Jantunen | 25 | Paris Basketball | (France) | June 2027 | 3 July 2025 | |
| 11 | G/F | (United States) | Brandon Boston Jr. | 23 | New Orleans Pelicans | (United States) | June 2026 | 4 August 2025 | |
| 00 | F/C | (United States) | Armando Bacot | 25 | Memphis Hustle | (United States) | June 2026 | 3 September 2025 | |
| 8 | SG | (United States) | Talen Horton-Tucker | 24 | Chicago Bulls | (United States) | June 2027 | 20 September 2025 | |
| 30 | F/C | (Gabon) | Chris Silva | 29 | AEK Athens | (Greece) | June 2026 | 3 January 2026 | |
| 12 | PG | (France) | Nando de Colo | 38 | ASVEL | (France) | June 2026 | 4 January 2026 | |

==== Out ====
| No. | Pos. | Nat. | Name | Age | Moving to | | Date | Source |
|---|---|---|---|---|---|---|---|---|
| 23 | G/F | (Serbia) | Marko Gudurić | 30 | Olimpia Milano | (Italy) | 25 June 2025 | |
| 0 | G | (United States) | Errick McCollum | 37 | Galatasaray | (Turkey) | 28 June 2025 | |
| 21 | F | (Canada) | Dyshawn Pierre | 31 | UNICS | (Russia) | 7 July 2025 | |
| 11 | PF | (United States) | Nigel Hayes-Davis | 30 | Phoenix Suns | (United States) | 8 July 2025 | |
| 5 | C | (Turkey) | Sertaç Şanlı | 34 | Dubai Basketball | (United Arab Emirates) | 23 September 2025 | |
| 3 | G | (Turkey) | Scottie Wilbekin | 32 | | | 30 March 2026 | |

== Pre-season and friendlies ==
=== Friendly matches ===
| 4 September 2025 18th Mehmet Baturalp Tournament | Fenerbahçe Beko (Turkish Basketball Federation) | 82–91 | (Turkish Basketball Federation) Galatasaray MCT Technic | Istanbul |
| 18:00 TRT (UTC+3) | Scoring by quarter: 22–21, 26–22, 13–32, 21–16 |
| | Pts: Baldwin 14 | Boxscore | Pts: Palmer 25 | Arena: Ülker Sports and Event Hall; Attendance: 0 |

| 8 September 2025 18th Mehmet Baturalp Tournament | Fenerbahçe Beko (Turkish Basketball Federation) | 92–93 | (United Arab Emirates Basketball Association) Dubai Basketball | Istanbul |
| 18:00 TRT (UTC+3) | Scoring by quarter: 21–29, 19–21, 28–19, 24–24 |
| | Pts: Mahmutoğlu 17 | Boxscore | Pts: Anđušić 22 | Arena: Ülker Sports and Event Hall; Attendance: 0 |

| 13 September 2025 Friendly | Esenler Erokspor (Turkish Basketball Federation) | 74–69 | (Turkish Basketball Federation) Fenerbahçe Beko | Istanbul |
| 17:00 TRT (UTC+3) | Scoring by quarter: 20–25, 15–18, 20–11, 19–15 |
| | | Boxscore | Pts: Biberović 13 | Arena: Sinan Erdem Dome |

| 17 September 2025 Friendly | AEK Athens (Hellenic Basketball Federation) | 102–102(OT) | (Turkish Basketball Federation) Fenerbahçe Beko | Athens |
| 19:30 EEST (UTC+3) | Scoring by quarter: 21–26, 19–21, 30–21, 21–23, Overtime: 11–11 |
| | Pts: Arms 21 | Boxscore | Pts: Biberović 24 | Arena: SUNEL Arena |

| 19 September 2025 Basketball Tournament Crete | Fenerbahçe Beko (Turkish Basketball Federation) | 67–77 | (Basketball Federation of Serbia) Crvena zvezda Meridianbet | Heraklion, Crete |
| 18:00 EEST (UTC+3) | Scoring by quarter: 12–20, 22–18, 19–17, 14–22 |
| | Pts: Baldwin IV 15 | Boxscore | Pts: Moneke, Nwora 14 | Arena: Heraklion Arena |

| 21 September 2025 Basketball Tournament Crete | Fenerbahçe Beko (Turkish Basketball Federation) | 73–69 | (Italian Basketball Federation) EA7 Emporio Armani Milan | Heraklion, Crete |
| 18:00 EEST (UTC+3) | Scoring by quarter: 14–26, 25–12, 19–20, 15–11 |
| | Pts: Hall 13 | Boxscore | Pts: LeDay 14 | Arena: Heraklion Arena |

== Overview ==
| Competition | First match | Last match | Starting round | Final position | Record | | | | | | | |
| Competition | First match | Last match | Starting round | Final position | Pld | W | D | L | PF | PA | PD | Win % |
|---|---|---|---|---|---|---|---|---|---|---|---|---|
| Basketbol Süper Ligi | 27 September 2025 | 19 June 2026 | Round 1 | Winners | 40 | 33 | 0 | 7 | 3,494 | 3,166 | +328 | 82.50 |
| EuroLeague | 1 October 2025 | 22 May 2026 | Round 1 | Semifinals | 43 | 27 | 0 | 16 | 3,522 | 3,463 | +59 | 62.79 |
| Turkish Cup | 17 February 2026 | 22 February 2026 | Quarterfinals | Winners | 3 | 3 | 0 | 0 | 280 | 228 | +52 | 100.00 |
| Presidential Cup | 24 September 2025 | | Final | Winners | 1 | 1 | 0 | 0 | 85 | 83 | +2 | 100.00 |
| Total | | | | | 87 | 64 | 0 | 23 | 7,381 | 6,940 | +441 | 73.56 |

Source: Competitions

=== Presidential Cup ===
| 24 September 2025 | Fenerbahçe Beko | 85–83 | Beşiktaş Gain | Istanbul |
| 20:30 TRT (UTC+3) | Scoring by quarter: 25–13, 18–21, 24–16, 18–33 |
| | Pts: Hall 23; Rebs: Jantunen 7 Asts: Baldwin 5 PIR: Jantunen 21 | Boxscore | Pts: Dotson 25; Rebs: Žižić 8 Asts: Žižić, Dotson 4 PIR: Dotson 29 | Arena: Sinan Erdem Dome; Attendance: 11,450; Referees: Emin Moğulkoç, Mehmet Serdar Ünal, Nazlı Çisil Güngör |

=== Basketbol Süper Ligi ===
==== League table ====
| Pos | Team | Pld | W | L | PF | PA | PD | Pts | Qualification or relegation |
|---|---|---|---|---|---|---|---|---|---|
| 1 | Fenerbahçe Beko (C) | 30 | 25 | 5 | 2644 | 2393 | +251 | 55 | Advance to playoffs |
| 2 | Beşiktaş Gain | 30 | 25 | 5 | 2602 | 2304 | +298 | 55 | Advance to playoffs |
| 3 | Bahçeşehir Koleji | 30 | 21 | 9 | 2495 | 2349 | +146 | 51 | Advance to playoffs |
| 4 | Anadolu Efes | 30 | 20 | 10 | 2650 | 2446 | +204 | 50 | Advance to playoffs |
| 5 | Türk Telekom | 30 | 20 | 10 | 2609 | 2436 | +173 | 50 | Advance to playoffs |

Source: Basketbol Süper Ligi
(C) Champions

==== Results summary ====
| Overall | | | | | | Home | | | | | Away | | | | |
| Pld | W | L | PF | PA | PD | W | L | PF | PA | PD | W | L | PF | PA | PD |
|---|---|---|---|---|---|---|---|---|---|---|---|---|---|---|---|
| 30 | 25 | 5 | 2644 | 2393 | +251 | 13 | 2 | 1341 | 1217 | +124 | 12 | 3 | 1303 | 1176 | +127 |

Source: TBF.org.tr

==== Results by round ====
| Round | 1 | 2 | 3 | 4 | 5 | 6 | 7 | 8 | 9 | 10 | 11 | 12 | 13 | 14 | 15 | 16 | 17 | 18 | 19 | 20 | 21 | 22 | 23 | 24 | 25 | 26 | 27 | 28 | 29 | 30 |
|---|---|---|---|---|---|---|---|---|---|---|---|---|---|---|---|---|---|---|---|---|---|---|---|---|---|---|---|---|---|---|
| Ground | A | H | H | A | H | A | H | A | H | A | H | A | H | A | H | H | A | A | H | A | H | A | H | A | H | A | H | A | H | A |
| Result | L | W | W | W | W | W | W | W | W | W | W | L | W | W | W | W | W | W | W | W | W | W | L | L | W | W | W | W | L | W |
| Position | 9 | 5 | 4 | 4 | 3 | 3 | 3 | 2 | 3 | 2 | 2 | 2 | 2 | 2 | 1 | 1 | 1 | 1 | 1 | 1 | 1 | 1 | 1 | 1 | 1 | 1 | 1 | 1 | 2 | 1 |

Source: TBF.org.tr
A = Away; H = Home; W = Win; L = Loss

==== Matches ====
Note: All times are TRT (UTC+3) as listed by Turkish Basketball Federation.

| 27 September 2025 1 | Tofaş | 80–78 | Fenerbahçe Beko | Bursa |
| 20:30 | Scoring by quarter: 18–18, 25–21, 15–22, 22–17 |
| | Pts: Blaževič 21; Rebs: Thomasson 7 Asts: Geçim 10; PIR: Blaževič 27 | Boxscore | Pts: Horton-Tucker 24; Rebs: Melli 11; Asts: Horton-Tucker 7 PIR: Horton-Tucker 24 | Arena: Tofaş Nilüfer Spor Salonu; Attendance: 3,654; Referees: Can Mavisu, Kaan Büyükçil, Uğur Akyıldız |

| 6 October 2025 2 | Fenerbahçe Beko | 105–83 | Petkim Spor | Istanbul |
| 19:00 | Scoring by quarter: 31–27, 29–14, 22–25, 23–17 |
| | Pts: Horton-Tucker 25; Rebs: Horton-Tucker 6 Asts: Baldwin IV 6 PIR: Horton-Tucker 25 | Boxscore | Pts: Franke 21; Rebs: four players 3 Asts: Whittaker 6 PIR: Blumbergs 18 | Arena: Ülker Sports and Event Hall; Attendance: 1,824; Referees: Emin Moğulkoç, Özge Şentürk Bayraktar, Polat Parlak |

| 12 October 2025 3 | Fenerbahçe Beko | 87–73 | Karşıyaka Basket | Istanbul |
| 15:30 | Scoring by quarter: 27–15, 16–23, 22–12, 22–23 |
| | Pts: Mahmutoğlu 16; Rebs: three players 4 Asts: Ekşioğlu 4 PIR: Mahmutoğlu 14 | Boxscore | Pts: Manning 17; Rebs: Alston, Geyik 7 Asts: Chiozza 8 PIR: Geyik 21 | Arena: Ülker Sports and Event Hall; Attendance: 3,258; Referees: Yener Yılmaz, Hüseyin Çelik, Tolga Edis |

| 19 October 2025 4 | Galatasaray MCT Technic | 76–85 | Fenerbahçe Beko | Istanbul |
| 15:30 | Scoring by quarter: 16–23, 26–21, 14–14, 20–27 |
| | Pts: Palmer 20; Rebs: White 6 Asts: Palmer 7 PIR: White 19 | Boxscore | Pts: Biberović, Melli 18; Rebs: Melli 6 Asts: Baldwin IV 8 PIR: Biberović, Melli 21 | Arena: Basketball Development Center; Attendance: 7,558; Referees: Kerem Baki, Alper Özgök, Orhan Çağrı Hekimoğlu |

| 26 October 2025 5 | Fenerbahçe Beko | 92–84 | Türk Telekom | Istanbul |
| 13:00 | Scoring by quarter: 33–25, 27–18, 17–15, 15–26 |
| | Pts: Biberović 14; Rebs: 5 players 4 Asts: Hall, Horton-Tucker 4 PIR: Biberović, Birsen 15 | Boxscore | Pts: Allman 21; Rebs: Bankston 7 Asts: Özdemiroğlu 5 PIR: Allman 21 | Arena: Ülker Sports and Event Hall; Attendance: 3,418; Referees: Zafer Yılmaz, Ziya Özorhon, Mehmet Serdar Ünal |

| 2 November 2025 6 | Mersin MSK | 78–87 | Fenerbahçe Beko | Mersin |
| 18:00 | Scoring by quarter: 22–17, 20–28, 15–20, 21–22 |
| | Pts: Cowan 19; Rebs: Olaseni 7 Asts: Cobbs, Olaseni 6 PIR: Olaseni 19 | Boxscore | Pts: Biberović 18; Rebs: Biberović 7 Asts: Baldwin IV 11; PIR: Biberović 21 | Arena: Servet Tazegül Arena; Attendance: 4,759; Referees: Mehmet Karabilecen, Murat Ciner, Musa Kazım Çetin |

| 8 November 2025 7 | Fenerbahçe Beko | 91–87 | ONVO Büyükçekmece | Istanbul |
| 13:00 | Scoring by quarter: 21–26, 14–28, 28–12, 28–21 |
| | Pts: Baldwin IV 23; Rebs: Birch 7 Asts: Baldwin IV 9 PIR: Baldwin IV, Jantunen 24 | Boxscore | Pts: Pipes 23; Rebs: Bandaogo 10; Asts: van der Vuurst de Vries 10; PIR: Bandaogo 26 | Arena: Ülker Sports and Event Hall; Attendance: 1,750; Referees: Fatih Arslanoğlu, Nazlı Çisil Güngör, Batuhan Söylemezoğlu |

| 16 November 2025 8 | Esenler Erokspor | 80–94 | Fenerbahçe Beko | Istanbul |
| 20:30 | Scoring by quarter: 18–21, 21–26, 19–26, 22–21 |
| | Pts: Love 19; Rebs: Arna 8 Asts: Pangos 7 PIR: Love 19 | Boxscore | Pts: Bacot 15; Rebs: Melli 6 Asts: Baldwin IV, Hall 6 PIR: Melli 17 | Arena: Sinan Erdem Dome; Attendance: 1,050; Referees: Ali Şakacı, Alper Özgök, Alper Gökçebel |

| 23 November 2025 9 | Fenerbahçe Beko | 92–84 | Bursaspor Yörsan | Istanbul |
| 20:30 | Scoring by quarter: 23–21, 18–24, 26–19, 25–20 |
| | Pts: Baldwin IV, Bitim 18; Rebs: Birch, Birsen 6 Asts: Baldwin IV 5 PIR: Bitim 24 | Boxscore | Pts: Childress 22; Rebs: Nnoko 9 Asts: Childress 5 PIR: Childress 23 | Arena: Ülker Sports and Event Hall; Attendance: 2,038; Referees: Can Mavisu, Özge Şentürk Bayraktar, Halil Erkoç |

| 7 December 2025 10 | Yukatel Merkezefendi Basket | 64–87 | Fenerbahçe Beko | Denizli |
| 13:00 | Scoring by quarter: 20–14, 18–24, 17–25, 9–24 |
| | Pts: Griffin 17; Rebs: Agva 6 Asts: İlyasoğlu 4 PIR: Bleijenbergh, İlyasoğlu 11 | Boxscore | Pts: Boston 21; Rebs: Boston 7 Asts: Baldwin IV 7 PIR: Boston 22 | Arena: Pamukkale University Arena; Attendance: 3,600; Referees: Emin Moğulkoç, Orhan Çağrı Hekimoğlu, Kerem Yılmaz |

| 14 December 2025 11 | Fenerbahçe Beko | 97–94(OT) | Anadolu Efes | Istanbul |
| 20:30 | Scoring by quarter: 27–15, 20–24, 22–28, 14–16, Overtime: 14–11 |
| | Pts: Biberović 22; Rebs: three players 4 Asts: Horton-Tucker 5 PIR: three players 21 | Boxscore | Pts: Hazer 31; Rebs: Poirier 8 Asts: Weiler-Babb 6 PIR: Hazer 30 | Arena: Ülker Sports and Event Hall; Attendance: 9,202; Referees: Mehmet Karabilecen, Kerem Baki, Tolga Akkuşoğlu |

| 20 December 2025 12 | Trabzonspor | 99–73 | Fenerbahçe Beko | Trabzon |
| 18:00 | Scoring by quarter: 25–29, 28–16, 22–11, 24–17 |
| | Pts: Reed 36; Rebs: Demir, Delgado 6 Asts: Taylor 7 PIR: Reed 34 | Boxscore | Pts: Birsen, Mahmutoğlu 12; Rebs: Birsen 6 Asts: Hall 4 PIR: Birsen 13 | Arena: Hayri Gür Arena; Attendance: 6,061; Referees: Yener Yılmaz, Özlem Yalman, Musa Kazım Çetin |

| 27 December 2025 13 | Fenerbahçe Beko | 93–79 | Manisa Basket | Istanbul |
| 13:00 | Scoring by quarter: 26–20, 17–18, 23–14, 27–27 |
| | Pts: Boston 20; Rebs: Melli 7 Asts: three players 4 PIR: Boston 19 | Boxscore | Pts: Mintz 20; Rebs: Johnson 5 Asts: Žemaitis 6 PIR: Mintz 17 | Arena: Ülker Sports and Event Hall; Attendance: 2,000; Referees: Hüseyin Çelik, Ahmet Tatlıcı, Polat Parlak |

| 4 January 2026 14 | Beşiktaş Gain | 87–101 | Fenerbahçe Beko | Istanbul |
| 20:30 | Scoring by quarter: 24–23, 23–25, 15–34, 25–19 |
| | Pts: Morgan 17; Rebs: Morgan 9 Asts: Uğurlu 5 PIR: Morgan 21 | Boxscore | Pts: Horton-Tucker 27; Rebs: Birsen 5 Asts: Melli, Horton-Tucker 4 PIR: Horton-Tucker 29 | Arena: Basketball Development Center; Attendance: 10,500; Referees: Emin Moğulkoç, Tolga Edis, Nazlı Çisil Güngör |

| 11 January 2026 15 | Fenerbahçe Beko | 89–58 | Bahçeşehir Koleji | Istanbul |
| 18:00 | Scoring by quarter: 23–16, 31–8, 16–19, 19–15 |
| | Pts: Silva 17; Rebs: Melli 7 Asts: Hall, Melli 5 PIR: Silva 18 | Boxscore | Pts: Cavanaugh 11; Rebs: Cavanaugh 9 Asts: Homesley 5 PIR: Cavanaugh 20 | Arena: Ülker Sports and Event Hall; Attendance: 3,572; Referees: Zafer Yılmaz, Ayşe Nur Yazıcıoğlu, Alper Gökçebel |

| 18 January 2026 16 | Fenerbahçe Beko | 90–82 | Tofaş | Istanbul |
| 18:00 | Scoring by quarter: 19–23, 26–15, 23–21, 22–23 |
| | Pts: Horton-Tucker 15; Rebs: Bacot 7 Asts: Horton-Tucker 8 PIR: Horton-Tucker 19 | Boxscore | Pts: Floyd 14; Rebs: five players 4 Asts: Pérez 4 PIR: Saybir 13 | Arena: Ülker Sports and Event Hall; Attendance: 2,948; Referees: Ali Şakacı, Mehmet Serdar Ünal, Alper Özgök |

| 25 January 2026 17 | Petkim Spor | 70–78 | Fenerbahçe Beko | Aliağa, İzmir |
| 18:00 | Scoring by quarter: 12–11, 18–19, 19–21, 21–27 |
| | Pts: Brown 11; Rebs: Sajus 7 Asts: Efianayi 8 PIR: Floyd 14 | Boxscore | Pts: Baldwin IV 22; Rebs: Melli 8 Asts: Birsen, de Colo 3 PIR: Baldwin IV 20 | Arena: Enka Sport Hall; Attendance: 2,498; Referees: Yener Yılmaz, Ahmet Tatlıcı, Halil Erkoç |

| 31 January 2026 18 | Karşıyaka Basket | 55–91 | Fenerbahçe Beko | İzmir |
| 15:30 | Scoring by quarter: 16–19, 10–29, 14–25, 15–18 |
| | Pts: Bishop 11; Rebs: Bishop 6 Asts: Menteşe 4 PIR: Bishop 14 | Boxscore | Pts: Boston 24; Rebs: Bacot 9 Asts: de Colo 4 PIR: Horton-Tucker 22 | Arena: Karşıyaka Arena; Attendance: 5,500; Referees: Mehmet Şahin, Alper Altuğ Köselerli, Murat Ciner |

| 8 February 2026 19 | Fenerbahçe Beko | 79–77 | Galatasaray MCT Technic | Istanbul |
| 15:30 | Scoring by quarter: 13–20, 19–13, 20–24, 27–20 |
| | Pts: Biberović 21; Rebs: Melli 10; Asts: Baldwin IV 6 PIR: Biberović 18 | Boxscore | Pts: Palmer 16; Rebs: Gillespie 7 Asts: Palmer 7 PIR: Palmer 19 | Arena: Ülker Sports and Event Hall; Attendance: 9,430; Referees: Özlem Yalman, Fatih Arslanoğlu, Batuhan Söylemezoğlu |

| 15 February 2026 20 | Türk Telekom | 76–88 | Fenerbahçe Beko | Ankara |
| 18:00 | Scoring by quarter: 20–20, 16–28, 22–22, 18–18 |
| | Pts: Allman 20; Rebs: Alexander 7 Asts: Allman 5 PIR: Alexander 20 | Boxscore | Pts: Boston 19; Rebs: Bacot, Boston 7 Asts: Horton-Tucker 6 PIR: Boston 21 | Arena: Ankara Arena; Attendance: 10,059; Referees: Kaan Büyükçil, Ziya Özorhon, Kerem Yılmaz |

| 8 March 2026 21 | Fenerbahçe Beko | 91–78 | Mersin MSK | Istanbul |
| 18:00 | Scoring by quarter: 21–17, 25–15, 22–19, 23–27 |
| | Pts: Baldwin IV 14; Rebs: Birch, Birsen 9 Asts: Žagars 4 PIR: Birsen 21 | Boxscore | Pts: Özmızrak 17; Rebs: Olaseni 7 Asts: Cruz 7 PIR: Özmızrak 16 | Arena: Ülker Sports and Event Hall; Attendance: 2,307; Referees: Kerem Baki, Alper Altuğ Köselerli, Özge Şentürk Bayraktar |

| 15 March 2026 22 | ONVO Büyükçekmece | 85–91 | Fenerbahçe Beko | Istanbul |
| 13:00 | Scoring by quarter: 25–22, 22–20, 19–22, 19–27 |
| | Pts: Lecque 20; Rebs: Bandaogo 6 Asts: Lecque 6 PIR: Lecque 20 | Boxscore | Pts: de Colo 13; Rebs: Bacot 8 Asts: Biberović, Horton-Tucker 6 PIR: de Colo 22 | Arena: Gazanfer Bilge Sports Hall; Attendance: 2,080; Referees: Can Mavisu, Mehmet Serdar Ünal, Uğur Akyıldız |

| 22 March 2026 23 | Fenerbahçe Beko | 88–94 | Esenler Erokspor | Istanbul |
| 13:00 | Scoring by quarter: 22–17, 24–26, 15–27, 27–24 |
| | Pts: Mahmutoğlu 20; Rebs: Bacot, Birsen 6 Asts: Mahmutoğlu 5 PIR: Mahmutoğlu 25 | Boxscore | Pts: Galloway, Thurman 20; Rebs: Simmons, Arna 5 Asts: Pangos 5 PIR: Galloway, Thurman 21 | Arena: Ülker Sports and Event Hall; Attendance: 2,106; Referees: Özlem Yalman, Alper Özgök, Orhan Çağrı Hekimoğlu |

| 29 March 2026 24 | Bursaspor | 89–83(OT) | Fenerbahçe Beko | Bursa |
| 20:30 | Scoring by quarter: 16–19, 23–13, 26–24, 10–19, Overtime: 14–8 |
| | Pts: Smith 27; Rebs: DeLaurier 8 Asts: Smith 5 PIR: Smith 26 | Boxscore | Pts: Baldwin IV 23; Rebs: Birsen 9 Asts: Žagars 5 PIR: Žagars 20 | Arena: Tofaş Nilüfer Spor Salonu; Attendance: 5,700; Referees: Emin Moğulkoç, Duhan Köyiçi, Batuhan Söylemezoğlu |

| 4 April 2026 25 | Fenerbahçe Beko | 82–69 | Yukatel Merkezefendi Basket | Istanbul |
| 15:30 | Scoring by quarter: 27–14, 24–19, 12–25, 19–11 |
| | Pts: Horton-Tucker 17; Rebs: four players 5 Asts: Žagars 6 PIR: Horton-Tucker 22 | Boxscore | Pts: Zoriks 17; Rebs: Agva 8 Asts: three players 3 PIR: Omić 16 | Arena: Ülker Sports and Event Hall; Attendance: 2,140; Referees: Mehmet Şahin, Ziya Özorhon, Tolga Edis |

| 13 April 2026 26 | Anadolu Efes | 73–89 | Fenerbahçe Beko | Istanbul |
| 19:00 | Scoring by quarter: 20–25, 20–21, 16–23, 17–20 |
| | Pts: Poirier 17; Rebs: Poirier 12; Asts: Dozier 5 PIR: Poirier 26 | Boxscore | Pts: Horton-Tucker 17; Rebs: Jantunen 6 Asts: Žagars 6 PIR: Žagars 14 | Arena: Basketball Development Center; Attendance: 3,070; Referees: Zafer Yılmaz, Hüseyin Çelik, Polat Parlak |

| 19 April 2026 27 | Fenerbahçe Beko | 93–90 | Trabzonspor | Istanbul |
| 15:30 | Scoring by quarter: 18–23, 23–16, 31–31, 21–20 |
| | Pts: Biberović 21; Rebs: Melli 6 Asts: Baldwin IV 6 PIR: Biberović, Melli 16 | Boxscore | Pts: Reed 31; Rebs: Reed 8 Asts: Reed 4 PIR: Reed 37 | Arena: Ülker Sports and Event Hall; Attendance: 5,044; Referees: Mehmet Karabilecen, Ali Şakacı, Alper Gökçebel |

| 24 April 2026 28 | Manisa Basket | 78–82 | Fenerbahçe Beko | Manisa |
| 19:00 | Scoring by quarter: 21–26, 18–25, 21–16, 18–15 |
| | Pts: Stevenson 15; Rebs: Johnson 10; Asts: Starks 5 PIR: Johnson 22 | Boxscore | Pts: Hall 18; Rebs: Birch 8 Asts: Hall, Melli 5 PIR: Melli 25 | Arena: Muradiye Sports Hall; Attendance: 3,500; Referees: Kerem Baki, Kaan Büyükçil, Halil Erkoç |

| 13 May 2026 29 | Fenerbahçe Beko | 72–85 | Beşiktaş Gain | Istanbul |
| 19:00 | Scoring by quarter: 9–26, 19–23, 24–16, 20–20 |
| | Pts: Melli 12; Rebs: Jantunen 6 Asts: Baldwin IV 6 PIR: Melli 14 | Boxscore | Pts: Mathews 16; Rebs: Brown, Žižić 5 Asts: Dotson 5 PIR: Dotson 22 | Arena: Ülker Sports and Event Hall; Attendance: 6,518; Referees: Özlem Yalman, Ali Şakacı, Alper Özgök |

| 16 May 2026 30 | Bahçeşehir Koleji | 86–96 | Fenerbahçe Beko | Istanbul |
| 15:30 | Scoring by quarter: 22–23, 18–25, 16–17, 30–31 |
| | Pts: Williams 18; Rebs: Cavanaugh 7 Asts: three players 3 PIR: Williams 20 | Boxscore | Pts: Silva 17; Rebs: Baldwin IV 6 Asts: Baldwin IV 8 PIR: Baldwin IV 26 | Arena: Sinan Erdem Dome; Attendance: 2,098; Referees: Mehmet Serdar Ünal, Ziya Özorhon, Duhan Köyiçi |

==== Playoffs ====
===== Quarterfinals =====
Win Loss

| 27 May 2026 1 | Fenerbahçe Beko | 94–72 (Series: 1–0) | Esenler Erokspor | Istanbul |
| 20:30 TRT (UTC+3) | Scoring by quarter: 28–19, 17–13, 21–17, 28–23 |
| | Pts: Horton-Tucker 19; Rebs: Jantunen 8 Asts: Hall, Horton-Tucker 4 PIR: Horton-Tucker, Jantunen 19 | Boxscore | Pts: Thurman 14; Rebs: three players 5 Asts: Arna, Pangos 4 PIR: Thurman 14 | Arena: Ülker Sports Arena; Attendance: 2,192; Referees: Yener Yılmaz, Ahmet Tatlıcı, Tolga Akkuşoğlu |

| 29 May 2026 2 | Esenler Erokspor | 73–96 (Series: 0−2) | Fenerbahçe Beko | Istanbul |
| 20:30 TRT (UTC+3) | Scoring by quarter: 11−25, 26−39, 19−15, 17−17 |
| | Pts: Cornelie 20; Rebs: Arna, Cornelie 5 Asts: Love 6 PIR: Cornelie 22 | Boxscore | Pts: Mahmutoğlu 21; Rebs: Colson 7 Asts: Baldwin IV 8 PIR: Horton-Tucker 22 | Arena: Sinan Erdem Dome; Attendance: 668; Referees: Alper Altuğ Köselerli, Kaan Büyükçil, Özge Şentürk Bayraktar |

==== Semifinals ====
Win Loss

| 1 June 2026 1 | Fenerbahçe Beko | 60–59 (Series: 1–0) | Anadolu Efes | Istanbul |
| 20:00 TRT (UTC+3) | Scoring by quarter: 6−21, 15−13, 15−17, 24−8 |
| | Pts: Biberović, Melli 16; Rebs: Birch, Melli 4 Asts: Hall 8 PIR: Melli 15 | Boxscore | Pts: Dozier 17; Rebs: Dozier, Poirier 5 Asts: Larkin 7 PIR: Poirier 17 | Arena: Ülker Sports Arena; Attendance: 4,607; Referees: Emin Moğulkoç, Seher Ayşe Nur Yazıcıoğlu, Uğur Akyıldız |

| 3 June 2026 2 | Fenerbahçe Beko | 73–72 (Series: 2–0) | Anadolu Efes | Istanbul |
| 20:00 TRT (UTC+3) | Scoring by quarter: 16−18, 16−29, 24−11, 17−14 |
| | Pts: Biberović 20; Rebs: Hall 7 Asts: Baldwin IV 4 PIR: Biberović 19 | Boxscore | Pts: Lloyd 19; Rebs: Lloyd 6 Asts: Lloyd 4 PIR: Lloyd 20 | Arena: Ülker Sports Arena; Attendance: 11,466; Referees: Hüseyin Çelik, Fatih Arslanoğlu, Murat Ciner |

| 5 June 2026 3 | Anadolu Efes | 102–93 (Series: 1–2) | Fenerbahçe Beko | Istanbul |
| 20:00 TRT (UTC+3) | Scoring by quarter: 29−26, 20−24, 27−17, 26−26 |
| | Pts: Larkin 31; Rebs: Yılmaz 6 Asts: Larkin 5 PIR: Larkin 31 | Boxscore | Pts: Biberović 29; Rebs: Birch 5 Asts: Baldwin IV, Hall 6 PIR: Baldwin IV, Biberović 28 | Arena: Basketball Development Center; Attendance: 4,976; Referees: Yener Yılmaz, Ahmet Tatlıcı, Tolga Edis |

| 7 June 2026 4 | Anadolu Efes | 93–102(OT) (Series: 1–3) | Fenerbahçe Beko | Istanbul |
| 20:00 TRT (UTC+3) | Scoring by quarter: 24−25, 25−19, 18−19, 20−24, Overtime: 6−15 |
| | Pts: Loyd 16; Rebs: Osmani 6 Asts: Larkin 5 PIR: Lloyd 21 | Boxscore | Pts: Baldwin IV 32; Rebs: Birch 9 Asts: Biberović 5 PIR: Baldwin IV 32 | Arena: Basketball Development Center; Attendance: 4,400; Referees: Kerem Baki, Ziya Özorhon, Tolga Akkuşoğlu |

==== Finals ====
Win Loss

| 13 June 2026 1 | Fenerbahçe Beko | 80–88 (Series: 0–1) | Beşiktaş Gain | Istanbul |
| 20:00 TRT (UTC+3) | Scoring by quarter: 16–27, 26–16, 19–19, 19–26 |
| | Pts: Biberović 16; Rebs: Melli 8 Asts: Baldwin IV 6 PIR: Biberović 16 | Boxscore | Pts: Uğurlu 20; Rebs: Arslan 6 Asts: Dotson 8 PIR: Uğurlu 23 | Arena: Ülker Sports Arena; Attendance: 10,054; Referees: Özlem Yalman, Altuğ Köselerli, Can Mavisu |

| 15 June 2026 2 | Fenerbahçe Beko | 93–68 (Series: 1–1) | Beşiktaş Gain | Istanbul |
| 20:00 TRT (UTC+3) | Scoring by quarter: 23–18, 27–19, 22–14, 21–17 |
| | Pts: Baldwin IV 17; Rebs: Melli 10; Asts: Baldwin IV 5 PIR: Baldwin IV 25 | Boxscore | Pts: Brown 17; Rebs: Brown 7 Asts: Uğurlu 6 PIR: Brown 21 | Arena: Ülker Sports Arena; Attendance: 10,000; Referees: Emin Moğulkoç, Yener Yılmaz, Özge Şentürk Bayraktar |

| 17 June 2026 3 | Beşiktaş Gain | 71–82 (Series: 1–2) | Fenerbahçe Beko | Istanbul |
| 20:00 TRT (UTC+3) | Scoring by quarter: 23–19, 17–24, 18–21, 13–18 |
| | Pts: Brown, Dotson 22; Rebs: Şanlı, Thomas 5 Asts: Brown 3 PIR: Brown 23 | Boxscore | Pts: Melli 17; Rebs: Melli 13; Asts: Baldwin IV, Hall 4 PIR: Melli 24 | Arena: Sinan Erdem Dome; Attendance: 17,000; Referees: Serdar Ünal, Mehmet Şahin, Ali Şakacı |

| 19 June 2026 4 | Beşiktaş Gain | 75–77 (Series: 1–3) | Fenerbahçe Beko | Istanbul |
| 20:00 TRT (UTC+3) | Scoring by quarter: 20–16, 25–24, 15–16, 15–21 |
| | Pts: Arslan 19; Rebs: Brown 10; Asts: Dotson 4 PIR: Arslan, Şanlı 16 | Boxscore | Pts: Baldwin IV 21; Rebs: Melli 11; Asts: Hall 6 PIR: Baldwin IV 25 | Arena: Sinan Erdem Dome; Attendance: 12,017; Referees: Zafer Yılmaz, Ziya Özorhon, Hüseyin Çelik |

=== EuroLeague ===
==== League table ====
The regular season began on 30 September 2025 and concluded on 17 April 2026. The 20 teams played against each other home-and-away in a round-robin format over 38 rounds, where only 10 teams advanced to the postseason. Moreover, the top six teams from regular season have received a bye to the playoffs, while the teams placed from 7th to 10th will participate in the play-in to get the last two playoff spots. At the tail end of the standings, teams placed from 11th to 20th were eliminated after the regular season.

| Pos | Team | Pld | W | L | PF | PA | PD | Qualification |
|---|---|---|---|---|---|---|---|---|
| 2 | (Spanish Basketball Federation) Valencia Basket | 38 | 25 | 13 | 3418 | 3243 | +175 | Qualification to playoffs |
| 3 | (Spanish Basketball Federation) Real Madrid | 38 | 24 | 14 | 3342 | 3156 | +186 | Qualification to playoffs |
| 4 | (Turkish Basketball Federation) Fenerbahçe Beko | 38 | 24 | 14 | 3114 | 3061 | +53 | Qualification to playoffs |
| 5 | (Lithuanian Basketball Federation) Žalgiris | 38 | 23 | 15 | 3304 | 3125 | +179 | Qualification to playoffs |
| 6 | (Israeli Basketball Association) Hapoel IBI Tel Aviv | 38 | 23 | 15 | 3329 | 3211 | +118 | Qualification to playoffs |

Source: EuroLeague
Rules for classification: Regular season tiebreakers

==== Results summary ====
| Overall | | | | | | Home | | | | | Away | | | | |
| Pld | W | L | PF | PA | PD | W | L | PF | PA | PD | W | L | PF | PA | PD |
|---|---|---|---|---|---|---|---|---|---|---|---|---|---|---|---|
| 38 | 24 | 14 | 3114 | 3061 | +53 | 13 | 5 | 1441 | 1361 | +80 | 11 | 9 | 1673 | 1700 | −27 |

Source: EuroLeague

==== Results by round ====
| Round | 1 | 2 | 3 | 4 | 5 | 6 | 7 | 8 | 9 | 10 | 11 | 12 | 13 | 14 | 15 | 16 | 17 | 18 | 19 | 20 | 21 | 22 | 23 | 24 | 25 | 26 | 27 | 28 | 29 | 30 | 31 | 32 | 33 | 34 | 35 | 36 | 37 | 38 |
|---|---|---|---|---|---|---|---|---|---|---|---|---|---|---|---|---|---|---|---|---|---|---|---|---|---|---|---|---|---|---|---|---|---|---|---|---|---|---|
| Ground | H | A | H | H | H | A | A | A | H | H | H | A | H | A | A | H | A | H | A | H | A | H | A | H | H | A | A | A | H | H | A | H | A | H | A | A | H | A |
| Result | W | L | L | L | W | W | L | L | W | W | W | W | W | L | W | L | W | W | W | W | L | W | W | W | W | W | W | W | W | W | L | W | L | L | L | L | L | W |
| Position | 1 | 5 | 11 | 17 | 14 | 9 | 12 | 16 | 13 | 11 | 10 | 8 | 8 | 8 | 4 | 5 | 5 | 5 | 3 | 3 | 5 | 3 | 2 | 2 | 1 | 1 | 1 | 1 | 1 | 1 | 1 | 1 | 1 | 1 | 2 | 3 | 5 | 4 |

Source: EuroLeague.net
A = Away; H = Home; W = Win; L = Loss; P = Postponed

==== Matches ====
Note: All times, from 26 October 2025 to 29 March 2026, are CET (UTC+1); up to 26 October 2025 and from 29 March 2026, are CEST (UTC+2) as listed by EuroLeague.

| 1 October 2025 1 | Fenerbahçe Beko (Turkish Basketball Federation) | 96–77 | (French Federation of Basketball) Paris Basketball | Istanbul |
| 19:45 | Scoring by quarter: 25–19, 18–21, 27–19, 26–18 |
| | Pts: Hall 22; Rebs: Melli 6 Asts: Baldwin 10; PIR: Hall 23 | Boxscore | Pts: Hifi 23; Rebs: Dokossi 10; Asts: Dokossi 3 PIR: Hifi 18 | Arena: Ülker Sports and Event Hall; Attendance: 10,414; Referees: Juan Carlos García, Artūras Šukys, Sérgio Silva |

| 3 October 2025 2 | Žalgiris (Lithuanian Basketball Federation) | 84–81 | (Turkish Basketball Federation) Fenerbahçe Beko | Kaunas |
| 19:00 | Scoring by quarter: 29–20, 14–17, 22–16, 19–28 |
| | Pts: Williams-Goss 20; Rebs: four players 4 Asts: Francisco, Ulanovas 4 PIR: Williams-Goss 23 | Boxscore | Pts: Baldwin 36; Rebs: Horton-Tucker 6 Asts: Baldwin, Hall 4 PIR: Baldwin 34 | Arena: Žalgiris Arena; Attendance: 15,203; Referees: Ilija Belošević, Jakub Zamojski, Anne Panther |

| 10 October 2025 3 | Fenerbahçe Beko (Turkish Basketball Federation) | 81–86 | (Basketball Federation of Serbia) Crvena zvezda Meridianbet | Istanbul |
| 19:45 | Scoring by quarter: 17–25, 13–18, 18–13, 33–30 |
| | Pts: Colson, Horton-Tucker 19; Rebs: Melli 6 Asts: Baldwin IV 8 PIR: Horton-Tucker 22 | Boxscore | Pts: Moneke 20; Rebs: Moneke 12; Asts: Miller-McIntyre 7 PIR: Moneke 31 | Arena: Ülker Sports and Event Hall; Attendance: 12,213; Referees: Miguel Angel Pérez, Gytis Vilius, Hugues Thépénier |

| 14 October 2025 4 | Fenerbahçe Beko (Turkish Basketball Federation) | 69–93 | (United Arab Emirates Basketball Association) Dubai Basketball | Istanbul |
| 19:45 | Scoring by quarter: 20–25, 11–21, 17–25, 21–22 |
| | Pts: Baldwin IV, Colson 12; Rebs: Hall, Jantunen 6 Asts: Baldwin IV 5 PIR: Hall 17 | Boxscore | Pts: Kabengele 26; Rebs: Petrušev 8 Asts: Prepelič, Wright IV 6 PIR: Kabengele 31 | Arena: Ülker Sports and Event Hall; Attendance: 7,314; Referees: Mehdi Difallah, Rain Peerandi, Thomas Bissuel |

| 16 October 2025 5 | Fenerbahçe Beko (Turkish Basketball Federation) | 88–73 | (German Basketball Federation) Bayern Munich | Istanbul |
| 19:45 | Scoring by quarter: 14–20, 23–12, 25–14, 26–27 |
| | Pts: Jantunen 15; Rebs: Birch, Hall; Asts: Žagars 4 PIR: Baldwin IV 16 | Boxscore | Pts: three players 13; Rebs: Gabriel 4 Asts: Baldwin 7 PIR: Baldwin 19 | Arena: Ülker Sports and Event Hall; Attendance: 8,650; Referees: Milan Nedović, Carlos Cortés, Sergio Manuel |

| 24 October 2025 6 | Anadolu Efes (Turkish Basketball Federation) | 69–79 | (Turkish Basketball Federation) Fenerbahçe Beko | Istanbul |
| 19:30 | Scoring by quarter: 24–18, 19–26, 15–14, 11–21 |
| | Pts: Weiler-Babb 17; Rebs: Šmits 5 Asts: Larkin 9 PIR: Larkin 19 | Boxscore | Pts: Hall, Wilbekin 12; Rebs: Baldwin IV 7 Asts: Baldwin IV 8 PIR: Baldwin IV, Hall 15 | Arena: Basketball Development Center; Attendance: 8,672; Referees: Juan Carlos García, Miloš Koljenšić, Alberto Baena |

| 28 October 2025 7 | Valencia Basket (Spanish Basketball Federation) | 94–79 | (Turkish Basketball Federation) Fenerbahçe Beko | Valencia |
| 21:00 | Scoring by quarter: 27–13, 24–22, 25–21, 18–23 |
| | Pts: Taylor 17; Rebs: Taylor 6 Asts: Montero 5 PIR: Taylor 20 | Boxscore | Pts: Biberović 18; Rebs: Horton-Tucker, Jantunen 5 Asts: Baldwin IV 5 PIR: Baldwin IV, Horton-Tucker 22 | Arena: Roig Arena; Attendance: 11,267; Referees: Saša Pukl, Artūras Šukys, Eduard Udyanskyy |

| 30 October 2025 8 | Real Madrid (Spanish Basketball Federation) | 84–58 | (Turkish Basketball Federation) Fenerbahçe Beko | Madrid |
| 21:00 | Scoring by quarter: 25–16, 24–6, 15–13, 20–23 |
| | Pts: Maledon 15; Rebs: Tavares 9 Asts: Campazzo 6 PIR: Maledon, Tavares 23 | Boxscore | Pts: Baldwin IV 14; Rebs: Horton-Tucker 6 Asts: Baldwin IV 3 PIR: Colson 11 | Arena: Movistar Arena; Referees: Tomislav Hordov, Oļegs Latiševs, Sašo Petek |

| 6 November 2025 9 | Fenerbahçe Beko (Turkish Basketball Federation) | 81–67 | (French Federation of Basketball) LDLC ASVEL | Istanbul |
| 18:45 | Scoring by quarter: 18–10, 27–24, 14–14, 22–19 |
| | Pts: Baldwin IV 14; Rebs: Melli 9 Asts: Baldwin IV 7 PIR: Baldwin IV 19 | Boxscore | Pts: Traoré 18; Rebs: Traoré 5 Asts: Watson 5 PIR: Traoré 25 | Arena: Ülker Sports and Event Hall; Attendance: 7,216; Referees: Milan Nedović, Carlos Cortés, Tomasz Trawicki |

| 11 November 2025 10 | Fenerbahçe Beko (Turkish Basketball Federation) | 84–75 | (Israeli Basketball Association) Maccabi Rapyd Tel Aviv | Munich (Note: The EuroLeague Round 10 game between Fenerbahçe Beko and Maccabi Rapyd Tel Aviv, and the Round 11 game against Hapoel IBI Tel Aviv, will take place at SAP Garden in Munich, Germany. This decision follows the recommendations of local authorities.) |
| 18:45 | Scoring by quarter: 20–15, 20–15, 25–26, 19–19 |
| | Pts: Baldwin IV 17; Rebs: Jantunen, Hall 6 Asts: Baldwin IV 4 PIR: Baldwin IV 16 | Boxscore | Pts: Sorkin 22; Rebs: Hoard 10; Asts: Blatt 7 PIR: Sorkin 27 | Arena: SAP Garden; Attendance: 2,541; Referees: Damir Javor, Saulius Račys, Leandro Lezcano |

| 13 November 2025 11 | Fenerbahçe Beko (Turkish Basketball Federation) | 74–68 | (Israeli Basketball Association) Hapoel IBI Tel Aviv | Munich |
| 18:45 | Scoring by quarter: 13–13, 14–15, 27–16, 20–24 |
| | Pts: Horton-Tucker 15; Rebs: Melli 10; Asts: Baldwin 3 PIR: Hall, Horton-Tucker 15 | Boxscore | Pts: Bryant 19; Rebs: Oturu 9 Asts: Bryant, Micić 3 PIR: Bryant 28 | Arena: SAP Garden; Attendance: 3,040; Referees: Carlos Peruga, Milos Koljensic, Mario Majkic |

| 21 November 2025 12 | Partizan Mozzart Bet (Basketball Federation of Serbia) | 87–99 | (Turkish Basketball Federation) Fenerbahçe Beko | Belgrade |
| 20:30 | Scoring by quarter: 11–24, 28–32, 29–19, 19–24 |
| | Pts: Brown 27; Rebs: Bonga 8 Asts: Milton 4 PIR: Brown 26 | Boxscore | Pts: Jantunen 19; Rebs: Melli 6 Asts: Baldwin 8 PIR: Baldwin 21 | Arena: Belgrade Arena; Attendance: 19,561; Referees: Mehdi Difallah, Emilio Perez, Amit Balak |

| 25 November 2025 13 | Fenerbahçe Beko (Turkish Basketball Federation) | 66–64 | (Italian Basketball Federation) Virtus Olidata Bologna | Istanbul |
| 18:45 | Scoring by quarter: 15–17, 15–14, 20–16, 16–17 |
| | Pts: Baldwin 18; Rebs: Melli 6 Asts: Colson 4 PIR: Baldwin 20 | Boxscore | Pts: Morgan 13; Rebs: Diouf 12; Asts: Pajola, Vildoza 5 PIR: three players 13 | Arena: Ülker Sports and Event Hall; Attendance: 7,932; Referees: Ilija Belošević, Thomas Bissuel, Sašo Petek |

| 12 December 2025 15 | AS Monaco Basket (French Federation of Basketball) | 86–92 | (Turkish Basketball Federation) Fenerbahçe Beko | Fontvieille, Monaco |
| 19:30 | Scoring by quarter: 21–14, 25–24, 23–22, 17–32 |
| | Pts: James 20; Rebs: Mirotić 7 Asts: Mirotić 6 PIR: Diallo 22 | Boxscore | Pts: Horton-Tucker 24; Rebs: Melli 10; Asts: Baldwin IV 7 PIR: Horton-Tucker 22 | Arena: Salle Gaston Médecin; Attendance: 4,487; Referees: Juan Carlos García, Milivoje Jovčić, Rain Peerandi |

| 16 December 2025 16 | Fenerbahçe Beko (Turkish Basketball Federation) | 77–81 | (Hellenic Basketball Federation) Panathinaikos AKTOR | Istanbul |
| 18:45 | Scoring by quarter: 16–17, 21–24, 20–9, 20–31 |
| | Pts: Horton-Tucker 22; Rebs: Melli, Horton-Tucker 6 Asts: Baldwin 7 PIR: Horton-Tucker 22 | Boxscore | Pts: Nunn 25; Rebs: Faried 7 Asts: Sloukas 7 PIR: Nunn 22 | Arena: Ülker Sports and Event Hall; Attendance: 12,813; Referees: Sreten Radović, Piotr Pastusiak, Maxime Boubert |

| 18 December 2025 17 | EA7 Emporio Armani Milan (Italian Basketball Federation) | 72–87 | (Turkish Basketball Federation) Fenerbahçe Beko | Milan |
| 20:30 | Scoring by quarter: 11–19, 21–21, 23–16, 17–31 |
| | Pts: Brooks 18; Rebs: Shields 6 Asts: Ellis 5 PIR: Ellis 18 | Boxscore | Pts: Horton-Tucker 23; Rebs: Melli 7 Asts: Baldwin IV 6 PIR: Horton-Tucker 25 | Arena: Unipol Forum; Attendance: 3,853; Referees: Ilija Belošević, Miloš Koljenšić, Alberto Baena |

| 23 December 2025 18 | Fenerbahçe Beko (Turkish Basketball Federation) | 72–71 | (Spanish Basketball Federation) Barcelona | Istanbul |
| 18:45 | Scoring by quarter: 17–13, 18–20, 18–19, 19–19 |
| | Pts: Horton-Tucker, Biberović 16; Rebs: Melli 10; Asts: Hall 4 PIR: Melli 16 | Boxscore | Pts: Punter 20; Rebs: Hernangómez 9 Asts: Laprovíttola 6 PIR: Brizuela 18 | Arena: Ülker Sports and Event Hall; Attendance: 9,796; Referees: Tomislav Hordov, Ioannis Foufis, Luka Kardum |

| 2 January 2026 19 | Baskonia (Spanish Basketball Federation) | 93–108 | (Turkish Basketball Federation) Fenerbahçe Beko | Vitoria-Gasteiz |
| 20:30 | Scoring by quarter: 28–24, 25–29, 29–32, 11–23 |
| | Pts: Luwawu-Cabarrot 20; Rebs: Luwawu-Cabarrot 7 Asts: Forrest 4 PIR: Luwawu-Cabarrot 22 | Boxscore | Pts: Baldwin 24; Rebs: Melli 7 Asts: Baldwin 7 PIR: Baldwin 29 | Arena: Buesa Arena; Attendance: 14,114; Referees: Mehdi Difallah, Borys Ryzhyk, Rain Peerandi |

| 6 January 2026 20 | Fenerbahçe Beko (Turkish Basketball Federation) | 88–80 | (Hellenic Basketball Federation) Olympiacos | Istanbul |
| 18:45 | Scoring by quarter: 18–22, 18–18, 26–22, 26–18 |
| | Pts: Horton-Tucker, Baldwin 17; Rebs: Melli 7 Asts: Baldwin 11; PIR: Baldwin 26 | Boxscore | Pts: Vezenkov 24; Rebs: Hall 11; Asts: Walkup 5 PIR: Vezenkov 32 | Arena: Ülker Sports and Event Hall; Attendance: 10,452; Referees: Sreten Radović, Carlos Cortés, Sérgio Silva |

| 8 January 2026 21 | Dubai Basketball (United Arab Emirates Basketball Association) | 92–81 | (Turkish Basketball Federation) Fenerbahçe Beko | Dubai |
| 17:00 | Scoring by quarter: 24–22, 27–20, 22–20, 19–19 |
| | Pts: Wright 22; Rebs: Kamenjaš 15; Asts: Bacon, Wright 4 PIR: Kamenjaš 34 | Boxscore | Pts: Baldwin 21; Rebs: Horton-Tucker 5 Asts: Baldwin 5 PIR: Baldwin 26 | Arena: Coca-Cola Arena; Attendance: 7,029; Referees: Carlos Peruga, Miloš Koljenšić, Kristaps Konstantinovs |

| 16 January 2026 22 | Fenerbahçe Beko (Turkish Basketball Federation) | 82–79 | (Spanish Basketball Federation) Valencia Basket | Istanbul |
| 18:45 | Scoring by quarter: 28–20, 17–14, 21–24, 16–21 |
| | Pts: de Colo 16; Rebs: Jantunen 6 Asts: Biberović 5 PIR: Baldwin 20 | Boxscore | Pts: Reuvers 17; Rebs: Taylor 8 Asts: Montero 5 PIR: Reuvers 20 | Arena: Ülker Sports and Event Hall; Attendance: 11,731; Referees: Ilija Belošević, Oļegs Latiševs, Marcin Kowalski |

| 21 January 2026 23 | Virtus Olidata Bologna (Italian Basketball Federation) | 80–85 | (Turkish Basketball Federation) Fenerbahçe Beko | Bologna |
| 20:30 | Scoring by quarter: 25–22, 22–18, 13–25, 20–20 |
| | Pts: Edwards 35; Rebs: Niang 7 Asts: Pajola 5 PIR: Edwards 30 | Boxscore | Pts: Horton-Tucker 28; Rebs: Biberović, Hall 6 Asts: Melli, Horton-Tucker 3 PIR: Horton-Tucker 28 | Arena: Virtus Arena; Attendance: 8,012; Referees: Juan Carlos García, Saulius Račys, Sašo Petek |

| 23 January 2026 24 | Fenerbahçe Beko (Turkish Basketball Federation) | 84–71 | (Spanish Basketball Federation) Baskonia | Istanbul |
| 18:45 | Scoring by quarter: 21–20, 21–18, 27–12, 15–21 |
| | Pts: Horton-Tucker 21; Rebs: Horton-Tucker 8 Asts: Bacot 3 PIR: Horton-Tucker 22 | Boxscore | Pts: Omoruyi 14; Rebs: Omoruyi 6 Asts: Forrest 3 PIR: Omoruyi 21 | Arena: Ülker Sports and Event Hall; Attendance: 11,370; Referees: Tomislav Hordov, Gytis Vilius, Robert Vyklický |

| 29 January 2026 25 | Fenerbahçe Beko (Turkish Basketball Federation) | 79–62 | (Turkish Basketball Federation) Anadolu Efes | Istanbul |
| 18:45 | Scoring by quarter: 25–8, 14–17, 22–14, 18–23 |
| | Pts: Horton-Tucker 22; Rebs: Melli 7 Asts: Baldwin 9 PIR: Horton-Tucker 27 | Boxscore | Pts: Lee 19; Rebs: three players 4 Asts: Hazer 4 PIR: Lee 15 | Arena: Ülker Sports and Event Hall; Attendance: 11,965; Referees: Carlos Peruga, Borys Ryzhyk, Tomasz Trawicki |

| 3 February 2026 26 | Barcelona (Spanish Basketball Federation) | 78–82 | (Turkish Basketball Federation) Fenerbahçe Beko | Barcelona |
| 20:30 | Scoring by quarter: 14–29, 27–24, 15–20, 22–9 |
| | Pts: Punter 24; Rebs: Veselý 7 Asts: Satoranský 7 PIR: Punter 23 | Boxscore | Pts: Biberović 19; Rebs: Birch 8 Asts: Baldwin IV 7 PIR: Baldwin IV 26 | Arena: Palau Blaugrana; Attendance: 6,397; Referees: Robert Lottermoser, Luka Kardum, Uros Obrknezevic |

| 5 February 2026 27 | Paris Basketball (French Federation of Basketball) | 90–92 | (Turkish Basketball Federation) Fenerbahçe Beko | Paris |
| 20:45 | Scoring by quarter: 23–21, 22–19, 23–22, 22–30 |
| | Pts: Hifi 23; Rebs: Cavalière 5 Asts: Hifi 4 PIR: Hifi 20 | Boxscore | Pts: Biberović 19; Rebs: four players 4 Asts: Baldwin IV, Horton-Tucker 6 PIR: Biberović 21 | Arena: Adidas Arena; Attendance: 7,529; Referees: Miguel Ángel Pérez, Carlos Cortés, Leandro Lezcano |

| 13 February 2026 28 | Panathinaikos AKTOR (Hellenic Basketball Federation) | 83–85 | (Turkish Basketball Federation) Fenerbahçe Beko | Marousi, Athens |
| 20:15 | Scoring by quarter: 19–25, 23–16, 20–15, 21–29 |
| | Pts: Hernangómez 18; Rebs: Hernangómez 12; Asts: Grant 5 PIR: Hernangómez 31 | Boxscore | Pts: Biberović 26; Rebs: Melli 10; Asts: Baldwin 9 PIR: Biberović 28 | Arena: Telekom Center Athens; Attendance: 19,000; Referees: Carlos Peruga, Milan Nedović, Marcin Kowalski |

| 25 February 2026 29 | Fenerbahçe Beko (Turkish Basketball Federation) | 81–78 | (Basketball Federation of Serbia) Partizan Mozzart Bet | Istanbul |
| 18:45 | Scoring by quarter: 20–20, 15–19, 22–17, 24–22 |
| | Pts: Horton-Tucker 29; Rebs: Colson 8 Asts: Baldwin IV, Horton-Tucker 3 PIR: Horton-Tucker 33 | Boxscore | Pts: Fernando 18; Rebs: Fernando 9 Asts: Calathes 7 PIR: Jones 22 | Arena: Ülker Sports and Event Hall; Attendance: 11,883; Referees: Emilio Perez, Ioannis Foufis, Manuel Attard |

| 5 March 2026 30 | Fenerbahçe Beko (Turkish Basketball Federation) | 88–70 | (French Federation of Basketball) AS Monaco Basket | Istanbul |
| 18:45 | Scoring by quarter: 20–15, 24–21, 22–16, 22–18 |
| | Pts: Horton-Tucker 28; Rebs: Birch 9 Asts: Baldwin IV 6 PIR: Horton-Tucker 25 | Boxscore | Pts: James 14; Rebs: Diallo 8 Asts: James 8 PIR: James 23 | Arena: Ülker Sports and Event Hall; Attendance: 11,578; Referees: Sreten Radović, Carlos Cortés, Saulius Račys |

| 13 March 2026 31 | Crvena zvezda Meridianbet (Basketball Federation of Serbia) | 79–73 | (Turkish Basketball Federation) Fenerbahçe Beko | Belgrade |
| 20:00 | Scoring by quarter: 17–20, 16–22, 28–14, 18–17 |
| | Pts: Moneke 21; Rebs: Miller-McIntyre 8 Asts: Miller-McIntyre 12; PIR: Miller-McIntyre 21 | Boxscore | Pts: Baldwin IV 16; Rebs: Birch 10; Asts: Horton-Tucker 5 PIR: Colson 20 | Arena: Belgrade Arena; Attendance: 20,377; Referees: Juan Carlos García, Mehdi Difallah, Sérgio Silva |

| 17 March 2026 14 | Olympiacos (Hellenic Basketball Federation) | 104–87 | (Turkish Basketball Federation) Fenerbahçe Beko | Piraeus |
| 20:15 | Scoring by quarter: 23–29, 25–17, 26–21, 30–20 |
| | Pts: Fournier 36; Rebs: Milutinov 7 Asts: Walkup 11; PIR: Fournier 36 | Boxscore | Pts: Horton-Tucker 30; Rebs: Horton-Tucker 6 Asts: Baldwin 8 PIR: Horton-Tucker 31 | Arena: Peace and Friendship Stadium; Attendance: 12,747; Referees: Carlos Peruga, Oļegs Latiševs, Hugues Thépénier |
Note: The match, originally scheduled for 4 December 2025 at 20:15 (UTC+1), was suspended due to severe weather conditions.

| 20 March 2026 32 | Fenerbahçe Beko (Turkish Basketball Federation) | 79–75 | (Italian Basketball Federation) EA7 Emporio Armani Milan | Istanbul |
| 18:45 | Scoring by quarter: 17–23, 12–14, 28–15, 22–23 |
| | Pts: Horton-Tucker 23; Rebs: Birsen 8 Asts: Baldwin 4 PIR: de Colo, Horton-Tucker 19 | Boxscore | Pts: Brooks 22; Rebs: Leday, Nebo 6 Asts: Ellis 5 PIR: Brooks 19 | Arena: Ülker Sports and Event Hall; Attendance: 11,314; Referees: Emilio Pérez, Damir Javor, Carlos Cortés |

| 24 March 2026 33 | Maccabi Rapyd Tel Aviv (Israeli Basketball Association) | 94–89 | (Turkish Basketball Federation) Fenerbahçe Beko | Belgrade (Note: During the 2025–26 EuroLeague season, both Hapoel IBI Tel Aviv and Maccabi Playtika Tel Aviv are playing their home games outside of Israel due to the ongoing Gaza war. Maccabi Playtika Tel Aviv host their games at Aleksandar Nikolić Hall in Belgrade, Serbia, while Hapoel IBI Tel Aviv play at Arena 8888 in Sofia, Bulgaria, with selected games moved to Arena Botevgrad when Arena 8888 is unavailable, until further notice.) |
| 20:05 | Scoring by quarter: 25–20, 32–23, 15–23, 22–23 |
| | Pts: Sorkin 19; Rebs: Hoard 9 Asts: Clark, Blatt 8 PIR: Sorkin 19 | Boxscore | Pts: de Colo 26; Rebs: Birsen, Birch 5 Asts: Baldwin 7 PIR: de Colo 26 | Arena: Aleksandar Nikolić Hall; Attendance: 162; Referees: Ilija Belošević, Luka Kardum, Alberto Baena |

| 27 March 2026 34 | Fenerbahçe Beko (Turkish Basketball Federation) | 82–92 | (Lithuanian Basketball Federation) Žalgiris | Istanbul |
| 18:45 | Scoring by quarter: 25–22, 19–27, 18–17, 20–26 |
| | Pts: Baldwin 19; Rebs: Jantunen 7 Asts: Baldwin, Hall 4 PIR: Baldwin 19 | Boxscore | Pts: Sleva 18; Rebs: Butkevičius 8 Asts: Francisco 8 PIR: Butkevičius 23 | Arena: Ülker Sports and Event Hall; Attendance: 11,913; Referees: Tomislav Hordov, Joseph Bissang, Igor Dragojević |

| 1 April 2026 35 | Bayern Munich (German Basketball Federation) | 85–76 | (Turkish Basketball Federation) Fenerbahçe Beko | Munich |
| 19:00 | Scoring by quarter: 25–12, 18–18, 24–30, 18–16 |
| | Pts: Dimitrijević 22; Rebs: Gabriel 10; Asts: Obst 4 PIR: Dimitrijević 25 | Boxscore | Pts: Biberović 24; Rebs: Colson 6 Asts: Baldwin 5 PIR: Biberović 24 | Arena: SAP Garden; Attendance: 11,500; Referees: Miguel Ángel Pérez, Artūras Šukys, Miloš Koljenšić |

| 7 April 2026 36 | Hapoel IBI Tel Aviv (Israeli Basketball Association) | 95–80 | (Turkish Basketball Federation) Fenerbahçe Beko | Sofia |
| 20:00 | Scoring by quarter: 25–17, 26–21, 24–18, 20–24 |
| | Pts: Oturu 23; Rebs: Bryant 9 Asts: Jones 7 PIR: Bryant 32 | Boxscore | Pts: Baldwin 22; Rebs: Colson 7 Asts: Baldwin 6 PIR: Baldwin 26 | Arena: Arena Sofia; Attendance: 2,312; Referees: Emilio Pérez, Milan Nedović, Sašo Petek |

| 9 April 2026 37 | Fenerbahçe Beko (Turkish Basketball Federation) | 69–74 | (Spanish Basketball Federation) Real Madrid | Istanbul |
| 19:45 | Scoring by quarter: 21–19, 13–21, 24–14, 11–20 |
| | Pts: Boston Jr. 21; Rebs: Melli 6 Asts: Baldwin 5 PIR: Boston Jr. 21 | Boxscore | Pts: Campazzo 15; Rebs: Lyles, Tavares 5 Asts: Hezonja 5 PIR: Campazzo 18 | Arena: Ülker Sports and Event Hall; Attendance: 12,803; Referees: Robert Lottermoser, Oļegs Latiševs, Marcin Kowalski |

| 16 April 2026 38 | LDLC ASVEL (French Federation of Basketball) | 76–81 | (Turkish Basketball Federation) Fenerbahçe Beko | Villeurbanne, Lyon |
| 20:00 | Scoring by quarter: 16–24, 26–24, 8–22, 26–11 |
| | Pts: Harrison 25; Rebs: Eboua 8 Asts: Angola 7 PIR: Harrison 33 | Boxscore | Pts: Horton-Tucker 21; Rebs: Melli 12; Asts: Hall 6 PIR: Melli 21 | Arena: LDLC Arena; Attendance: 11,184; Referees: Miguel Ángel Pérez, Milivoje Jovčić, Luka Kardum |

==== Playoffs ====
===== Quarterfinals =====
Win Loss

| 28 April 2026 Game 1 | Fenerbahçe Beko (Turkish Basketball Federation) | 89–78 (Series: 1–0) | (Lithuanian Basketball Federation) Žalgiris | Istanbul |
| 20:45 TRT | Scoring by quarter: 22–20, 25–9, 18–28, 24–21 |
| | Pts: Biberović 26; Rebs: Baldwin IV, Melli 5 Asts: Baldwin IV, de Colo, 4 PIR: Baldwin IV, Biberović 22 | Boxscore | Pts: Williams-Goss 24; Rebs: Wright 5 Asts: Williams-Goss, Francisco 6 PIR: Williams-Goss 24 | Arena: Ülker Sports and Event Hall; Attendance: 12,571; Referees: Carlos Peruga, Borys Ryzhyk, Thomas Bissuel |

| 30 April 2026 Game 2 | Fenerbahçe Beko (Turkish Basketball Federation) | 86–74 (Series: 2–0) | (Lithuanian Basketball Federation) Žalgiris | Istanbul |
| 20:45 TRT | Scoring by quarter: 26–14, 25–19, 15–14, 20–27 |
| | Pts: Melli 17; Rebs: Birch 7 Asts: Baldwin 7 PIR: Jantunen 23 | Boxscore | Pts: Tubelis, Wright 16; Rebs: four players 3 Asts: Francisco, Williams-Goss 6 PIR: Tubelis 19 | Arena: Ülker Sports and Event Hall; Attendance: 12,873; Referees: Miguel Ángel Pérez, Juan Carlos García, Miloš Koljenšić |

| 6 May 2026 Game 3 | Žalgiris (Lithuanian Basketball Federation) | 81–78 (Series: 1–2) | (Turkish Basketball Federation) Fenerbahçe Beko | Kaunas |
| 20:00 EEST | Scoring by quarter: 12–25, 23–17, 22–20, 24–16 |
| | Pts: Tubelis 26; Rebs: Francisco 7 Asts: Francisco 8 PIR: Tubelis 31 | Boxscore | Pts: Baldwin 16; Rebs: Melli 5 Asts: Baldwin 5 PIR: Baldwin 16 | Arena: Žalgiris Arena; Attendance: 14,792; Referees: Emilio Pérez, Mehdi Difallah, Sérgio Silva |

| 8 May 2026 Game 4 | Žalgiris (Lithuanian Basketball Federation) | 90–94(OT) (Series: 1–3) | (Turkish Basketball Federation) Fenerbahçe Beko | Kaunas |
| 20:00 EEST | Scoring by quarter: 20–25, 22–22, 20–14, 18–19, Overtime: 10–14 |
| | Pts: Francisco 23; Rebs: Wright 7 Asts: Francisco 11; PIR: Francisco 27 | Boxscore | Pts: Birch, Horton-Tucker 21; Rebs: Birch 13; Asts: Baldwin 5 PIR: Birch 31 | Arena: Žalgiris Arena; Attendance: 15,063; Referees: Ilija Belošević, Juan Carlos García, Carlos Cortés |

==== Final Four ====
===== Semifinal =====
| 22 May 2026 SF | Olympiacos (Hellenic Basketball Federation) | 79–61 | (Turkish Basketball Federation) Fenerbahçe Beko | Marousi, Greece |
| 17:00 (CEST) | Scoring by quarter: 18−12, 15−12, 23−17, 23−20 |
| | Pts: Peters 17; Rebs: Milutinov 13; Asts: Walkup 5 PIR: Milutinov 18 | Boxscore | Pts: Biberović 17; Rebs: Horton-Tucker 7 Asts: Baldwin 6 PIR: Horton-Tucker 23 | Arena: Telekom Center Athens; Referees: Sreten Radović, Carlos Peruga, Milan Nedović |

=== Turkish Basketball Cup ===
Win Loss

==== Quarterfinals ====
| 17 February 2026 QF | Safiport Erokspor | 76–83 | Fenerbahçe Beko | Istanbul |
| 20:30 TRT (UTC+3) | Scoring by quarter: 18–18, 21–26, 16–19, 21–20 |
| | Pts: Crawford 22; Rebs: Thurman 6 Asts: Love 5 PIR: Crawford 18 | Boxscore | Pts: de Colo 20; Rebs: Baldwin IV 7 Asts: Baldwin IV 7 PIR: de Colo 20 | Arena: Sinan Erdem Dome; Attendance: 750; Referees: Mehmet Karabilecen, Serdar Ünal, Polat Parlak |

==== Semifinals ====
| 20 February 2026 SF | Fenerbahçe Beko | 86–78 | Türk Telekom | Istanbul |
| 20:45 (UTC+3) | Scoring by quarter: 11–20, 23–22, 26–14, 26–22 |
| | Pts: Horton-Tucker 29; Rebs: Baldwin IV, Horton-Tucker 7 Asts: Baldwin IV, de Colo 4 PIR: Horton-Tucker 34 | Boxscore | Pts: Smith 12; Rebs: Özdemiroğlu 7 Asts: Allman Jr. 8 PIR: Simonović 14 | Arena: Sinan Erdem Dome; Attendance: 1,550; Referees: Yener Yılmaz, Ali Şakacı, Tolga Akkuşoğlu |

==== Final ====
| 22 February 2026 F | Fenerbahçe Beko | 91–74 | Beşiktaş Gain | Istanbul |
| 20:00 (UTC+3) | Scoring by quarter: 22–24, 24–18, 24–14, 21–18 |
| | Pts: Biberović 28; Rebs: Biberović 10; Asts: Baldwin IV 9 PIR: Biberović 34 | Boxscore | Pts: Dotson 17; Rebs: Şanlı 8 Asts: Uğurlu 6 PIR: Şanlı 19 | Arena: Sinan Erdem Dome; Attendance: 10,673; Referees: Ali Şakacı, Tolga Edis, Tolga Akkuşoğlu |

== Statistics ==
Legend
| GP | Games played | GS | Games started | MPG | Minutes per game |
| FG% | Field-goal percentage | 3FG% | 3-point field-goal percentage | FT% | Free-throw percentage |
| RPG | Rebounds per game | APG | Assists per game | SPG | Steals per game |
| BPG | Blocks per game | PPG | Points per game | PIR | PIR per game |

| Player | Left during season |

=== Basketbol Süper Ligi ===
| Player | GP | GS | MPG | 2FG% | 3FG% | FT% | RPG | APG | SPG | BPG | PPG | PIR |
|---|---|---|---|---|---|---|---|---|---|---|---|---|
| Armando Bacot | 19 | 10 | 17:11 | .569 | .346 | .763 | 3.7 | 1.3 | 0.3 | 1.0 | 6.0 | 9.0 |
| Wade Baldwin IV | 30 | 2 | 21:48 | .553 | .367 | .789 | 3.0 | 4.8 | 0.8 | 0.2 | 12.6 | 13.9 |
| Faruk Biberović | 2 | 1 | 2:28 | — | 1.000 | — | 1.5 | 0.5 | 0 | 0 | 1.5 | 2.5 |
| Tarik Biberović | 34 | 32 | 23:58 | .500 | .497 | .897 | 3.5 | 2.0 | 0.3 | 0.1 | 12.7 | 12.4 |
| Khem Birch | 31 | 24 | 17:20 | .506 | .000 | .543 | 3.8 | 0.8 | 0.6 | 0.4 | 4.5 | 6.8 |
| Metecan Birsen | 38 | 4 | 16:39 | .629 | .250 | .727 | 3.5 | 1.0 | 0.3 | 0.1 | 5.3 | 6.8 |
| Onuralp Bitim | 33 | 3 | 15:24 | .510 | .368 | .784 | 1.9 | 0.3 | 0.6 | 0.1 | 5.4 | 5.0 |
| Brandon Boston Jr. | 19 | 4 | 17:18 | .481 | .340 | .800 | 2.7 | 0.7 | 0.4 | 0.1 | 8.4 | 7.3 |
| Bonzie Colson | 13 | 2 | 17:18 | .563 | .378 | .783 | 3.6 | 0.5 | 0.6 | 0 | 7.4 | 8.1 |
| Nando de Colo | 14 | 0 | 14:39 | .400 | .423 | .907 | 1.6 | 3.1 | 0.7 | 0 | 6.6 | 8.1 |
| Demircan Demir | 3 | 0 | 2:07 | — | — | .000 | 0.7 | 0.3 | 0 | 0 | 0 | 0.3 |
| Mert Emre Ekşioğlu | 27 | 2 | 6:00 | .308 | .364 | .600 | 0.7 | 0.6 | 0.2 | 0 | 1.1 | 1.4 |
| Devon Hall | 30 | 29 | 23:26 | .509 | .372 | .913 | 3.3 | 3.4 | 0.5 | 0.1 | 9.3 | 11.0 |
| Talen Horton-Tucker | 31 | 23 | 21:03 | .560 | .303 | .743 | 3.4 | 3.0 | 1.1 | 0.6 | 13.2 | 13.2 |
| Mikael Jantunen | 32 | 12 | 17:36 | .673 | .374 | .791 | 3.4 | 0.8 | 0.6 | 0.2 | 7.1 | 9.0 |
| Melih Mahmutoğlu | 35 | 12 | 16:55 | .585 | .416 | .897 | 1.2 | 0.8 | 0.4 | 0 | 7.4 | 6.3 |
| Nicolò Melli | 32 | 27 | 21:09 | .581 | .410 | .640 | 5.8 | 1.9 | 0.7 | 0.3 | 7.6 | 12.1 |
| Yiğit Hamza Mestoğlu | 3 | 0 | 1:13 | .000 | — | — | 0 | 0 | 0 | 0 | 0 | -0.3 |
| Chris Silva | 8 | 3 | 16:28 | .674 | .000 | .765 | 3.9 | 0.4 | 0.5 | 0.9 | 10.5 | 12.0 |
| Artūrs Žagars | 17 | 7 | 14:23 | .478 | .414 | .790 | 0.7 | 2.4 | 0.5 | 0 | 7.3 | 6.4 |
| Scottie Wilbekin | 7 | 3 | 14:07 | .556 | .379 | 1.000 | 0.7 | 2.1 | 0.7 | 0 | 6.7 | 6.4 |
| TOTAL | — | | | .550 | .387 | .768 | 33.2 | 19.1 | 6.1 | 2.2 | 87.4 | 98.2 |

Source: Basketbol Süper Ligi

=== EuroLeague ===
| Player | GP | GS | MPG | 2FG% | 3FG% | FT% | RPG | APG | SPG | BPG | PPG | PIR |
|---|---|---|---|---|---|---|---|---|---|---|---|---|
| Armando Bacot | 26 | 2 | 10:07 | .436 | .312 | .812 | 1.8 | 0.6 | 0.3 | 0.3 | 2.4 | 1.3 |
| Wade Baldwin IV | 42 | 7 | 25:50 | .521 | .293 | .785 | 3.2 | 5.5 | 0.7 | 0.4 | 14.0 | 16.4 |
| Tarik Biberović | 41 | 36 | 24:20 | .524 | .419 | .952 | 3.0 | 1.3 | 0.4 | 0.1 | 11.3 | 8.3 |
| Khem Birch | 43 | 40 | 16:32 | .629 | — | .677 | 4.0 | 0.4 | 0.3 | 0.4 | 3.9 | 4.9 |
| Metecan Birsen | 24 | 3 | 11:14 | .417 | .350 | .842 | 2.2 | 0.3 | 0.3 | 0.1 | 2.4 | 2.7 |
| Onuralp Bitim | 29 | 0 | 10:36 | .680 | .364 | .538 | 1.3 | 0.3 | 0.4 | 0.2 | 2.7 | 2.4 |
| Brandon Boston Jr. | 28 | 2 | 11:49 | .547 | .326 | .769 | 1.6 | 0.3 | 0.5 | 0.2 | 4.8 | 3.8 |
| Bonzie Colson | 40 | 14 | 16:52 | .495 | .485 | .898 | 3.0 | 0.8 | 0.6 | 0.4 | 7.1 | 8.7 |
| Nando de Colo | 17 | 0 | 17:24 | .635 | .468 | .972 | 1.4 | 2.4 | 0.2 | 0 | 9.8 | 9.9 |
| Devon Hall | 35 | 34 | 25:15 | .531 | .291 | .845 | 2.9 | 2.6 | 0.5 | 0.1 | 8.3 | 8.4 |
| Talen Horton-Tucker | 41 | 33 | 23:50 | .571 | .265 | .757 | 3.8 | 2.2 | 0.7 | 0.5 | 15.7 | 14.5 |
| Mikael Jantunen | 36 | 14 | 18:35 | .483 | .322 | .868 | 3.2 | 0.7 | 0.4 | 0.2 | 5.2 | 4.9 |
| Melih Mahmutoğlu | 7 | 1 | 5:58 | .250 | .308 | 1.000 | 0.4 | 0.1 | 0 | 0 | 2.1 | 0.1 |
| Nicolò Melli | 35 | 26 | 23:44 | .532 | .421 | .552 | 5.6 | 1.6 | 0.8 | 0.5 | 7.2 | 10.1 |
| Chris Silva | 16 | 0 | 8:42 | .614 | — | .889 | 1.7 | 0.4 | 0.3 | 0.1 | 4.4 | 4.2 |
| Artūrs Žagars | 5 | 0 | 11:16 | .429 | .250 | .800 | 0.2 | 1.6 | 0.6 | 0 | 3.4 | 4.2 |
| Scottie Wilbekin | 6 | 3 | 14:49 | .545 | .440 | .500 | 0.7 | 1.3 | 0.8 | 0 | 7.7 | 5.8 |
| TOTAL | — | | | .543 | .361 | .796 | 35.4 | 16.1 | 5.2 | 2.9 | 81.9 | 86.5 |

Source: EuroLeague
