= Mikael Jantunen =

Finnish basketball player (born 2000)

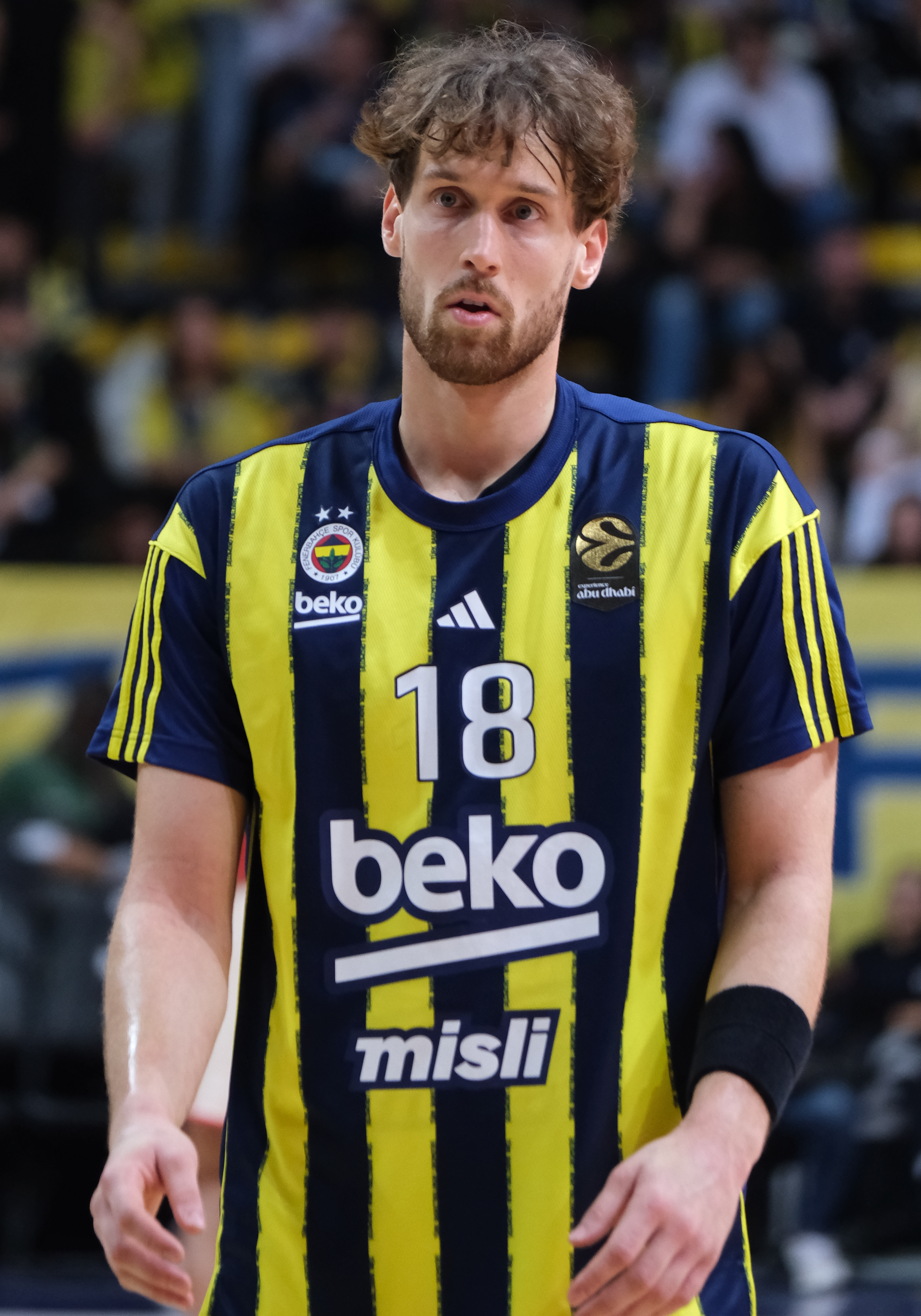
- Jantunen with Fenerbahçe in 2025

No. 20 – Real Madrid
- Position: Power forward
- League: Liga ACB; EuroLeague

Personal information
- Born: 20 April 2000 (age 26) Helsinki, Finland
- Listed height: 2.04 m (6 ft 8 in)
- Listed weight: 100 kg (220 lb)

Career information
- High school: Helsinki Basketball Academy (Helsinki, Finland)
- College: Utah (2019–2021)
- NBA draft: 2022: undrafted
- Playing career: 2016–present

Career history
- 2016–2019: HBA-Märsky
- 2021–2022: Oostende
- 2022–2023: Treviso
- 2023–2025: Paris Basketball
- 2025–2026: Fenerbahçe
- 2026–present: Real Madrid

Career highlights
- EuroCup champion (2024); EuroLeague SuperCup champion (2026); French League champion (2025); French Cup winner (2025); French League Cup winner (2024); Turkish League champion (2026); Turkish Cup winner (2026); Turkish Super Cup winner (2025); BNXT League Belgian champion (2022); BNXT Sixth Man of the Year (2022)

Mikael Olli Axel Jantunen (born 20 April 2000) is a Finnish professional basketball player for Real Madrid of the Liga ACB and the EuroLeague. He played college basketball for the Utah Utes. Jantunen also represents the Finland national team.

== Early life and career ==
Jantunen grew up in Vuosaari, Helsinki and initially played football before switching to basketball at the age of 11. He started basketball in a youth team of a local club Wartti Basket. Jantunen competed for HBA-Märsky in Finnish second-tier Koripallon I-divisioona from 2016 to 2019, while attending the Helsinki Basketball Academy.

== College career ==
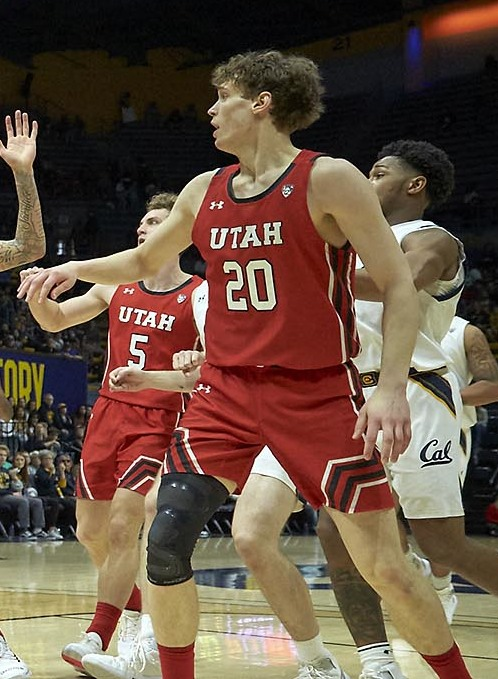
Jantunen playing for Utah in 2020

In October 2018, Jantunen committed to Utah over offers from Loyola Marymount, Oregon State, Georgia Tech, and Stanford. Jantunen started three games as a freshman and averaged 6.7 points and 4.9 rebounds per game. He suffered a fractured nose in December 2020, forcing him to wear a protective mask. On 9 January 2021, Jantunen scored a career-high 20 points in a 79–73 loss to Oregon. As a sophomore, Jantunen averaged 8.9 points, 4.5 rebounds, and 1.5 assists per game. Following the season, he opted to turn professional.

== Professional career ==
=== Oostende (2021–2022) ===
On 23 July 2021, Jantunen signed with Filou Oostende of the BNXT League and the Basketball Champions League. At the end of the season, he won the BNXT League Sixth Man of the Year award, as well as the Belgian championship with Oostende.

=== Treviso (2022–2023) ===
On 14 June 2022, Jantunen was announced by Italian club Treviso Basket of the Lega Basket Serie A (LBA) on a two-year deal. After one season with Treviso, Jantunen terminated his contract with the club. During the season, he had played 29 games in the Italian league, scoring 8.2 points and grabbing 4.9 rebounds in 23.6 minutes per game.

On 28 June 2023, Jantunen was named in the Golden State Warriors squad for the 2023 NBA Summer League. He averaged 7.8 points and 3.3 rebounds in 18.0 min playing time in four games.

=== Paris Basketball (2023–2025) ===
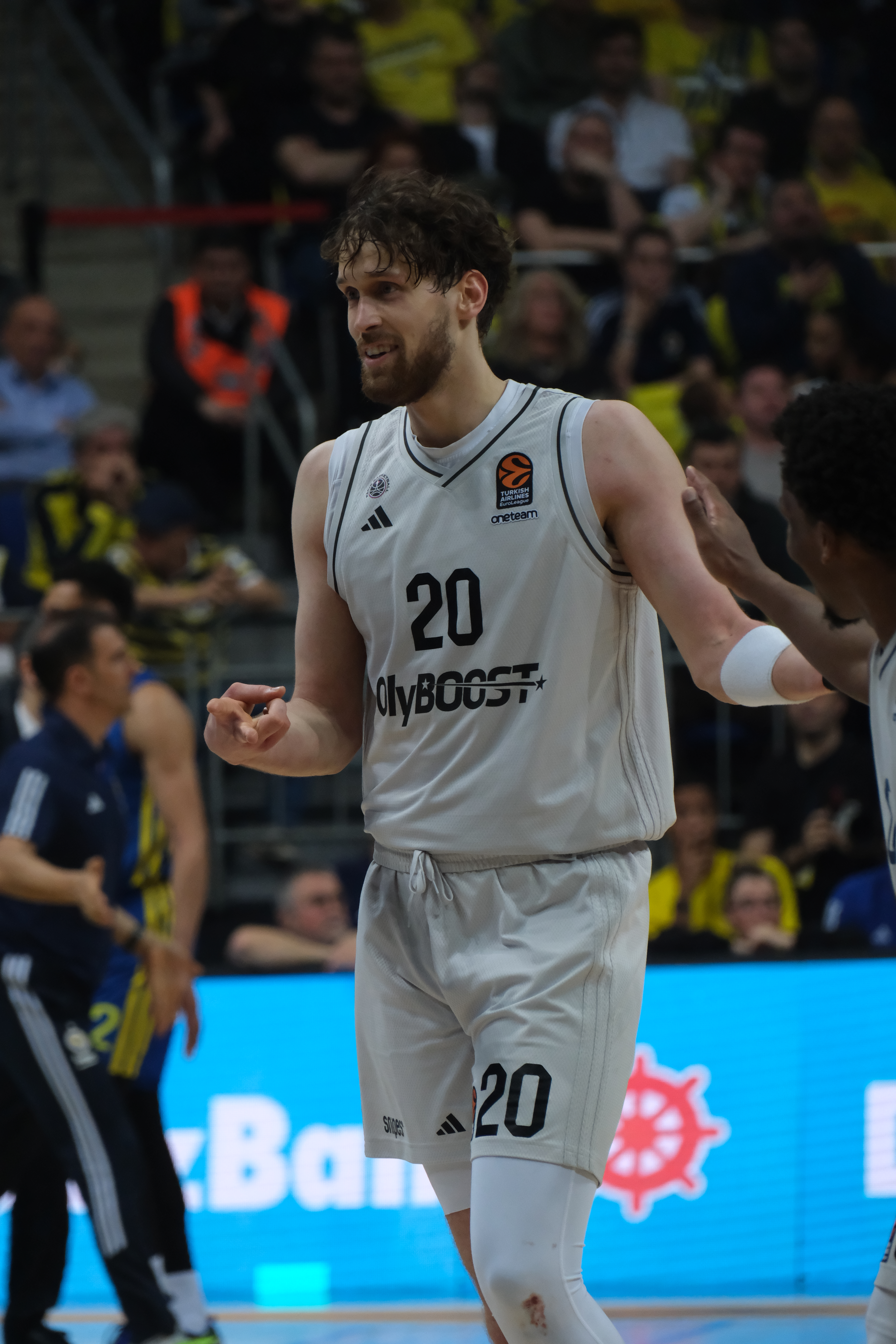
Jantunen with Paris in 2025

On 26 July 2023, he signed a two-year deal with Paris Basketball of the LNB Pro A and the EuroCup. Jantunen and Paris became the LNB Pro A Leaders Cup champions in February 2024, by defeating Nanterre 90–85 in the final.

In April 2024, Jantunen and Paris defeated French league rivals JL Bourge-en-Bresse in the 2024 EuroCup Finals by 2–0 and were crowned the EuroCup champions, thus earning a spot to the EuroLeague next season. After placing 2nd in the regular season of the French League, Jantunen and Paris advanced to the 2024 Playoff Finals, where they were eventually defeated by AS Monaco 3–1 and finished as the season's runners-up.

On 4 October 2024, Jantunen debuted in the EuroLeague with Paris, recording nine points, six rebounds and two steals, in an 80–77 defeat against Crvena zvezda in the season opening match. On 1 November, in a EuroLeague win over Baskonia, Jantunen received his second consecutive Player of the Game selection. In his first season in the EuroLeague, Jantunen started 38 games, as Paris reached the 2025 EuroLeague Playoffs.

Jantunen and Paris were crowned the French Cup champions at the end of April 2025. They also finished as the top seed team in the French league regular season and eventually won the championship in the 2024–25 LNB Élite season, by beating AS Monaco in the finals 3–2.

=== Fenerbahçe (2025–2026) ===
On July 3, 2025, he signed with Fenerbahçe of the Basketbol Süper Ligi (BSL) and the EuroLeague, on a two-year contract valued at €1.1 million.

On 24 September 2025, he made his debut with the team in the 2025 Turkish Super Cup Final against Beşiktaş. Jantunen helped Fenerbahçe to win the title (85–83), recording 19 points and 7 rebounds. On 1 October 2025, he made his EuroLeague debut with Fenerbahçe against his former club Paris Basketball, with 5 points, 3 rebounds and 1 assist in 15 mins in a 96–77 victory.

=== Real Madrid (2026–present) ===
On July 22, 2026, Jantunen signed a two–year deal with Real Madrid of the Liga ACB and the EuroLeague.

== National team career ==
Jantunen played with Finland U16 at the 2016 FIBA U16 European Championship tournament. He was named in the Finland U17 roster at the 2016 FIBA U17 World Cup in Zaragoza, Spain, where he averaged 5.6 points and 6.1 rebounds in seven games. Jantunen also represented Finland at the 2018 FIBA U18 European Championship. He averaged 17 points, 10 rebounds and 3.6 assists per game, shooting 72.3 percent from the field.

Jantunen played several games for the Finnish senior national team in the FIBA EuroBasket 2022 Qualifier round. He was forced to miss time with Utah in February 2021 to play in the matches.

Jantunen was part of the Finland squad in the EuroBasket 2022, where Finland finished 7th, and the 2023 FIBA World Cup final tournament. He also played in the 2024 FIBA Olympic qualifying tournament in Valencia, Spain, being named in the tournament's All-Star Five with 17.7 points, 7.3 rebounds and 3 assists per game over three matches against Bahamas, Poland and Spain.

He was a key player for Finland at the EuroBasket 2025, where they reached the semi-finals for the first time in the nation's history, and eventually finished 4th in the tournament. Jantunen averaged over 12 points in nine games as the second-best scorer for Finland, and was named the Player of the Game in the quarter-final win against Georgia.

== Career statistics ==
Legend
GP	Games played	GS	Games started	MPG	Minutes per game
FG%	Field goal percentage	3P%	3-point field goal percentage	FT%	Free throw percentage
RPG	Rebounds per game	APG	Assists per game	SPG	Steals per game
BPG	Blocks per game	PPG	Points per game	**Bold**	Career high

†	Denotes season in which Jantunen won the League/Cup

=== EuroLeague ===
Year	Team	GP	GS	MPG	FG%	3P%	FT%	RPG	APG	SPG	BPG	PPG	PIR
2024–25	Paris Basketball	**38**	**38**	**25.3**	**.632**	**.388**	.824	**4.8**	**1.0**	**.7**	**.2**	**7.5**	**9.5**
2025–26	Fenerbahçe	36	14	18.4	.385	.322	**.868**	3.2	.7	.4	**.2**	5.2	4.9
2026–27	Real Madrid	6	2	19.1	.500	.333	.769	2.5	.8	.2	.2	6.3	7.7
Career		80	54	22.0	.465	.361	.840	3.9	.8	.5	.2	6.4	7.3

=== EuroCup ===
Year	Team	GP	GS	MPG	FG%	3P%	FT%	RPG	APG	SPG	BPG	PPG	PIR
2023–24†	Paris Basketball	23	14	21.0	.545	.415	.844	4.0	1.2	1.1	.2	7.9	11.1

=== FIBA Champions League ===
Year	Team	GP	GS	MPG	FG%	3P%	FT%	RPG	APG	SPG	BPG	PPG
2021–22	Oostende	13	13	20.8	.508	.476	.600	4.1	.9	.4	.5	7.0

=== Domestic leagues ===
Year	Team	League	GP	MPG	FG%	3P%	FT%	RPG	APG	SPG	BPG	PPG
2016–17	(Finland) HBA-Märsky	I-divisioona	27	16.3	.571	.167	.500	4.0	1.1	.7	.2	4.6
2017–18	(Finland) HBA-Märsky	I-divisioona	22	23.1	.643	.259	.687	8.5	2.0	1.8	.6	13.5
2018–19	(Finland) HBA-Märsky	I-divisioona	17	22.4	.617	.304	.727	7.4	2.0	1.7	.8	13.9
2021–22	(Belgium) Oostende	BNXT	24	22.1	.595	.391	.838	5.1	.8	.9	.2	12.0
2022–23	(Italy) Treviso	LBA	29	23.6	.503	.380	.898	4.9	.7	.9	.3	8.2
2023–24	(France) Paris	LNB Élite	31	19.8	.484	.359	.811	3.6	1.1	.5	.2	7.2
2024–25†	(France) Paris	LNB Élite	22	19.5	.546	.500	.944	3.8	1.0	.5	.1	7.1
2025–26†	(Turkey) Fenerbahçe	TBSL	22	17.9	.453	.371	.892	3.3	.9	.7	.2	7.0

=== National team ===
Team	Tournament	Pos.	GP	PPG	RPG	APG
Finland	EuroBasket 2022	7th	7	6.1	4.0	1.7
Finland	2023 FIBA World Cup	21st	5	8.0	5.2	3.2
Finland	EuroBasket 2025	4th	9	12.1	4.8	2.3

=== College ===
Year	Team	GP	GS	MPG	FG%	3P%	FT%	RPG	APG	SPG	BPG	PPG
2019–20	Utah	**31**	3	23.2	**.661**	.313	.733	**4.9**	1.1	.4	**.3**	6.7
2020–21	Utah	20	**20**	**28.1**	.600	**.370**	**.857**	4.5	**1.5**	**.7**	.1	**8.9**
Career		51	23	25.1	.631	.349	.779	4.7	1.2	.5	.2	7.6

== Personal life ==
Jantunen is bilingual and speaks Finnish and Swedish as his native languages.

He is a close friend with Miami Heat guard Pelle Larsson, with whom he shared a flat when playing for Utah.
