= 2026 Turkish Basketball Cup =

- Season: 2025–26
- Duration: 17–22 February
- Games played: 7
- Teams: 8
- TV partner: a Spor

Finals
- Champions: Fenerbahçe Beko (10th title)
- Runners-up: Beşiktaş Gain

Awards
- Final MVP: (Turkey) Tarik Biberović

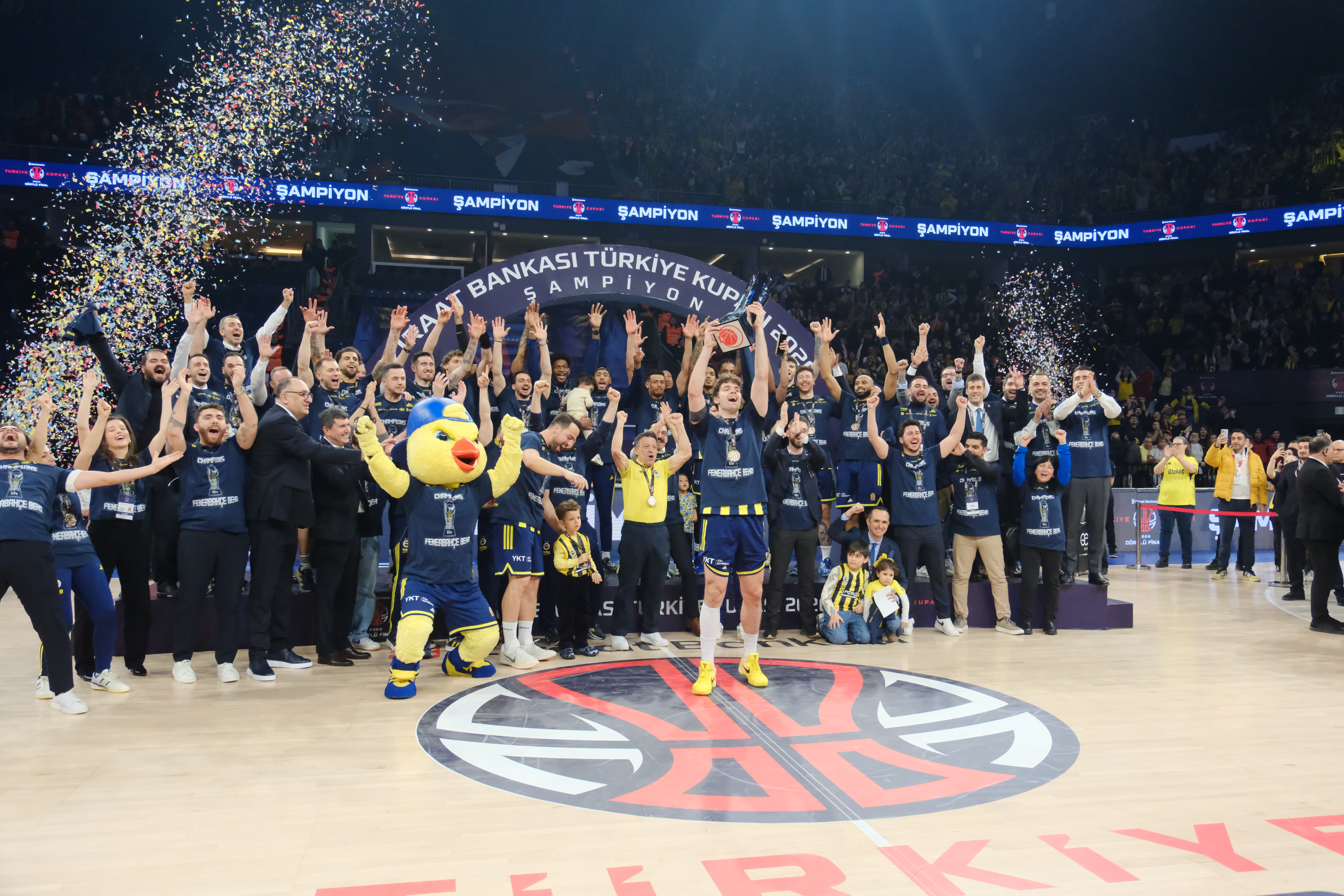
Fenerbahçe title ceremony

The 2026 Turkish Basketball Cup (Turkish: 2026 Basketbol Erkekler Türkiye Kupası), also known as Ziraat Bankası Türkiye Kupası for sponsorship reasons, was the 39th edition of Turkey's top-tier level professional national domestic basketball cup competition. The quarterfinals of tournament was held from 17 and 18 February 2026 in 4 different locations, followed by the semi-finals and the final held from 20 to 22 February 2026 at the Sinan Erdem Dome in Istanbul, Turkey.

Fenerbahçe won 10 championship in their 15 final appearance, while Beşiktaş played a total of 5 Turkish Cup finals and won 1 of them.

== Qualified teams ==
The top eight placed teams after the first half of the top-tier level Basketbol Süper Ligi 2025–26 season qualified for the tournament. The four highest-placed teams will play against the lowest-seeded teams in the quarter-finals. The competition will be played under a single elimination format.

Pos	Team	Pld	W	L	PF	PA	PD	Pts	Seeding
1	Fenerbahçe Beko	15	13	2	1351	1206	+145	28	Seeded
2	Beşiktaş Gain	15	13	2	1287	1174	+113	28	Seeded
3	Bahçeşehir Koleji	15	11	4	1238	1188	+50	26	Seeded
4	Türk Telekom	15	10	5	1297	1181	+116	25	Seeded
5	Trabzonspor	15	10	5	1304	1236	+68	25	Unseeded
6	Anadolu Efes	15	9	6	1310	1213	+97	24	Unseeded
7	Safiport Erokspor	15	9	6	1247	1170	+77	24	Unseeded
8	Tofaş	15	8	7	1253	1209	+44	23	Unseeded

Source: Basketbol Süper Ligi

== Draw ==
The 2026 Turkish Basketball Cup was drawn on 22 January 2026. The seeded teams were paired in the quarterfinals with the non-seeded teams.

== Bracket ==
Quarterfinals; 17–18 February
1	Fenerbahçe Beko	83
7	Safiport Erokspor	76
4	Türk Telekom	100
5	Trabzonspor	77
2	Beşiktaş Gain	100
8	Tofaş	91
3	Bahçeşehir Koleji	67
6	Anadolu Efes	88

Semifinals; 20 February
1	Fenerbahçe Beko	86
4	Türk Telekom	78
2	Beşiktaş Gain	91
6	Anadolu Efes	82

Final; 22 February
1	Fenerbahçe Beko	91
2	Beşiktaş Gain	74

== Quarterfinals ==
Note: All times are TRT (UTC+3) as listed by Turkish Basketball Federation.

17 February 2026 QF	Türk Telekom	100–77	Trabzonspor	Ankara
18:00	Scoring by quarter: 18–17, 33–20, 28–21, 21–19
a Spor	Pts: Simonović 19; Rebs: Simonović 12; Asts: Allman, Smith 9 PIR: Allman 28	Boxscore	Pts: Reed 18; Rebs: three players 4 Asts: Ulusoy 7 PIR: Taylor 17	Arena: Ankara Arena; Attendance: 6,113; Referees: Zafer Yılmaz, Özlem Yalman, Ahmet Tatlıcı

17 February 2026 QF	Safiport Erokspor	76–83	Fenerbahçe Beko	Istanbul
20:30	Scoring by quarter: 18–18, 21–26, 16–19, 21–20
a Spor	Pts: Crawford 22; Rebs: Thurman 6 Asts: Love 5 PIR: Crawford 18	Boxscore	Pts: de Colo 20; Rebs: Baldwin IV 7 Asts: Baldwin IV 7 PIR: de Colo 20	Arena: Sinan Erdem Dome; Attendance: 750; Referees: Mehmet Karabilecen, Serdar Ünal, Polat Parlak

18 February 2026 QF	Tofaş	91–100	Beşiktaş Gain	Bursa
18:00	Scoring by quarter: 30–23, 23–25, 17–29, 21–29
a Spor	Pts: Korkmaz, Saybir 20; Rebs: Cengiz 4 Asts: Pérez 9 PIR: Saybir 24	Boxscore	Pts: Brown 30; Rebs: Kamagate 7 Asts: Dotson 9 PIR: Brown 32	Arena: Tofaş Nilüfer Spor Salonu; Attendance: 2,724; Referees: Emin Moğulkoç, Altuğ Köselerli, Özge Şentürk Bayraktar

18 February 2026 QF	Bahçeşehir Koleji	67–88	Anadolu Efes	Istanbul
20:30	Scoring by quarter: 4–24, 20–17, 17–17, 26–30
a Spor	Pts: Williams 16; Rebs: Williams 9 Asts: Flynn 5 PIR: Williams 21	Boxscore	Pts: Hazer 18; Rebs: Poirier 8 Asts: Dozier, Yılmaz 5 PIR: Lee 18	Arena: Sinan Erdem Dome; Attendance: 3,469; Referees: Hüseyin Çelik, Kaan Büyükçil, Ayşe Nur Yazıcıoğlu

== Semifinals ==
20 February 2026 SF	Beşiktaş Gain	91–82	Anadolu Efes	Istanbul
17:15	Scoring by quarter: 23–20, 30–19, 18–30, 20–13
a Spor	Pts: Şanlı 18; Rebs: Brown, Kamagate 7 Asts: Dotson 7 PIR: Dotson 18	Boxscore	Pts: Dozier 15; Rebs: Weiler-Babb 7 Asts: Dozier 4 PIR: Dozier 25	Arena: Sinan Erdem Dome; Referees: Fatih Arslanoğlu, Ziya Özorhon, Tolga Edis

20 February 2026 SF	Fenerbahçe Beko	86–78	Türk Telekom	Istanbul
20:45	Scoring by quarter: 11–20, 23–22, 26–14, 26–22
a Spor	Pts: Horton-Tucker 29; Rebs: Baldwin IV, Horton-Tucker 7 Asts: Baldwin IV, de Colo 4 PIR: Horton-Tucker 34	Boxscore	Pts: Smith 12; Rebs: Özdemiroğlu 7 Asts: Allman Jr. 8 PIR: Simonović 14	Arena: Sinan Erdem Dome; Referees: Yener Yılmaz, Ali Şakacı, Tolga Akkuşoğlu

== Final ==
=== Summary ===
Fenerbahçe Beko and Beşiktaş Gain faced each other in the final of the 2026 Turkish Basketball Cup at Sinan Erdem Dome, which marked their fourth meeting in the finals of the last four major domestic competitions. The match was officiated by referees Ali Şakacı, Tolga Edis and Tolga Akkuşoğlu.

Fenerbahçe began the game with Scottie Wilbekin, Wade Baldwin IV, Tarik Biberović, Mikael Jantunen and Khem Birch in the starting lineup and opened with a 5–0 run. Beşiktaş, starting with Devon Dotson, Jonah Mathews, Anthony Brown, Conor Morgan and Sertaç Şanlı, responded effectively from long range and closed the first quarter ahead 24–22.

In the second quarter Fenerbahçe increased its offensive tempo, regaining the lead through the scoring of Biberović and entering halftime with a 46–42 advantage. The defending side created further separation in the third quarter, highlighted by a scoring surge that pushed the margin to double digits and established a 70–56 lead heading into the final quarter. Although Beşiktaş attempted to reduce the deficit, Fenerbahçe maintained control and secured a 91–74 victory.

Tarik Biberović recorded 28 points, 10 rebounds and 2 assists, earning the Most Valuable Player award of the final, while Wade Baldwin contributed 21 points, 6 rebounds and 9 assists. Additional scoring support came from Metecan Birsen with 14 points and Talen Horton-Tucker with 11. For Beşiktaş, Devon Dotson led the team with 17 points, while Sertaç Şanlı and Jonah Mathews added 14 points each.

The championship trophy was presented to Fenerbahçe captain Melih Mahmutoğlu by Minister of Youth and Sports Osman Aşkın Bak and Turkish Basketball Federation president Hidayet Türkoğlu. Mahmutoğlu then invited MVP Tarik Biberović to lift the trophy, while Beşiktaş received the runners-up award.

=== Details ===
22 February 2026 F	Fenerbahçe Beko	91–74	Beşiktaş Gain	Istanbul
20:00 TRT (UTC+3)	Scoring by quarter: 22–24, 24–18, 24–14, 21–18
a Spor	Pts: Biberović 28; Rebs: Biberović 10; Asts: Baldwin IV 9 PIR: Biberović 34	Boxscore	Pts: Dotson 17; Rebs: Şanlı 8 Asts: Uğurlu 6 PIR: Şanlı 19	Arena: Sinan Erdem Dome; Referees: Ali Şakacı, Tolga Edis, Tolga Akkuşoğlu

Starters:			Pts	Reb	Ast
PG	2	(United States) Wade Baldwin IV	21	6	9
SG	3	(Turkey) Scottie Wilbekin	3	0	1
SF	13	(Turkey) Tarik Biberović	28	10	2
PF	18	(Finland) Mikael Jantunen	0	6	1
C	92	(Canada) Khem Birch	7	8	2
Reserves:					
C	00	(United States) Armando Bacot	2	3	1
F	1	(Turkey) Metecan Birsen	14	2	0
G/F	8	(United States) Talen Horton-Tucker	11	3	1
SG	10	(Turkey) Melih Mahmutoğlu	3	0	0
G/F	11	(United States) Brandon Boston Jr.	0	0	0
G	12	(France) Nando de Colo	2	1	2
SF	17	(Turkey) Onuralp Bitim	0	3	0
Head coach:
(Lithuanian Basketball Federation) Šarūnas Jasikevičius

Fenerbahçe	Beşiktaş

Fenerbahçe	Statistics	Beşiktaş
21/36 (58.3%)	2-point field goals	13/38 (34.2%)
9/23 (39.1%)	3-point field goals	13/33 (39.3%)
22/31 (70.9%)	Free throws	9/14 (64.2%)
8	Offensive rebounds	10
35	Defensive rebounds	23
43	Total rebounds	33
19	Assists	16
6	Steals	3
11	Turnovers	9
3	Blocks	1

Starters:			Pts	Reb	Ast
PG	1	(United States) Devon Dotson	17	1	2
SG	0	(United States) Jonah Mathews	14	2	2
SF	21	(United States) Anthony Brown	0	1	2
PF	9	(Canada) Conor Morgan	1	2	2
C	5	(Turkey) Sertaç Şanlı	14	8	1
Reserves:					
C	4	(France) Ismaël Kamagate	2	4	0
PG	6	(Turkey) Berk Uğurlu	6	2	6
SG	7	(Turkey) Yiğit Arslan	11	4	0
PF	15	(Turkey) Yiğit Çoban	DNP		
PG	19	(Turkey) Emir Adıgüzel	DNP		
SG	22	(United States) Matt Thomas	7	2	0
PF	33	(United States) Vitto Brown	2	2	1
Head coach:
(Basketball Federation of Serbia) Dušan Alimpijević

2026 Turkish Cup Winners
Fenerbahçe Beko
(10th title)

== See also ==
- 2025–26 Basketbol Süper Ligi
