= Metecan Birsen =

Turkish basketball player (born 1995)

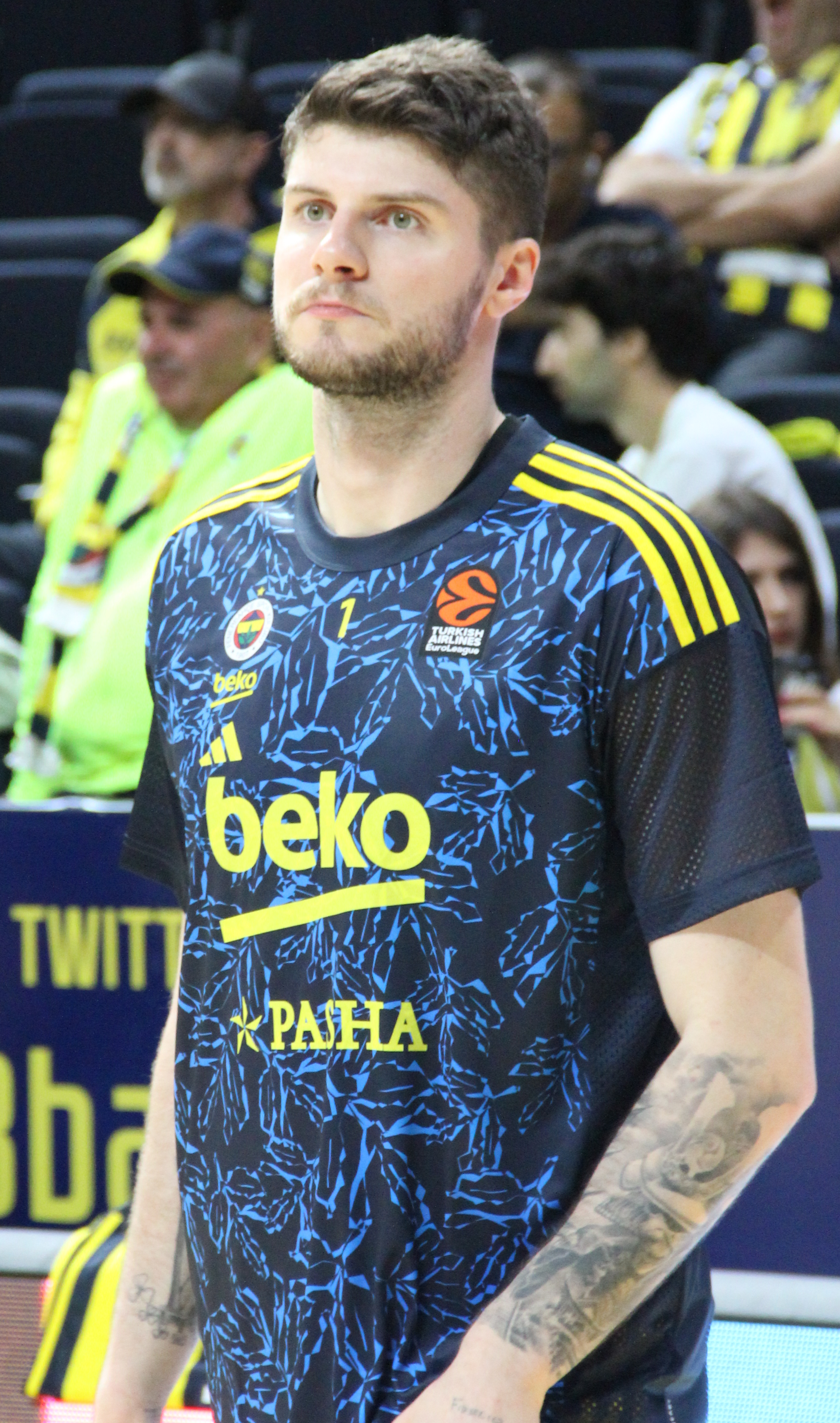
- Birsen with Fenerbahçe in 2024

No. 11 – Beşiktaş Fuzul
- Position: Power forward / center
- League: BSL; EuroLeague

Personal information
- Born: April 6, 1995 (age 31) Kadıköy, Istanbul, Turkey
- Listed height: 6 ft 10 in (2.08 m)
- Listed weight: 223 lb (101 kg)

Career information
- NBA draft: 2017: undrafted
- Playing career: 2011–present

Career history
- 2011–2015: Fenerbahçe
- 2014–2015: →Eskişehir
- 2015–2017: İstanbul BB
- 2017–2018: Sakarya BB
- 2018–2019: Anadolu Efes
- 2019–2021: Karşıyaka
- 2021–2026: Fenerbahçe
- 2026–present: Beşiktaş

Career highlights
- EuroLeague champion (2025); 6× Turkish BSL champion (2014, 2019, 2022, 2024–2026); 4× Turkish Cup winner (2013, 2024–2026); 3× Turkish Super Cup winner (2013, 2018, 2025); Nike International Junior Tournament MVP (2012)
Medals
Men's basketball
Representing Turkey
FIBA Europe Under-20 Championship
Gold medal – first place	2014 Greece	U-20 Team
Bronze medal – third place	2015 Italy	U-20 Team
FIBA Europe Under-18 Championship
Gold medal – first place	2013 Latvia	U-18 Team
FIBA Europe Under-16 Championship
Bronze medal – third place	2010 Montenegro	U-16 Team

James Metecan Birsen (born April 6, 1995) is a Turkish-Irish professional basketball player for Beşiktaş of the Turkish Basketbol Süper Ligi (BSL) and the EuroLeague. Standing at 6 ft 10 in (2.08 m), he primarily plays at the power forward position, but he can also play as small forward, or even as centre in small-ball lineups.

== Professional career ==
=== Fenerbahçe (2011–2015) ===
Birsen grew up with the Fenerbahçe Ülker juniors team and he made his debut with Fenerbahçe during the 2011–12 season. On 26 August 2014, he was loaned for a season to Olin Edirne, later renamed as Eskişehir Basket. Then Olin Edirne relocated to Eskişehir as Eskişehir Basket. Over 23 Turkish League games played in the 2014–15 season, he averaged 3.1 points and 1.9 rebounds per game.

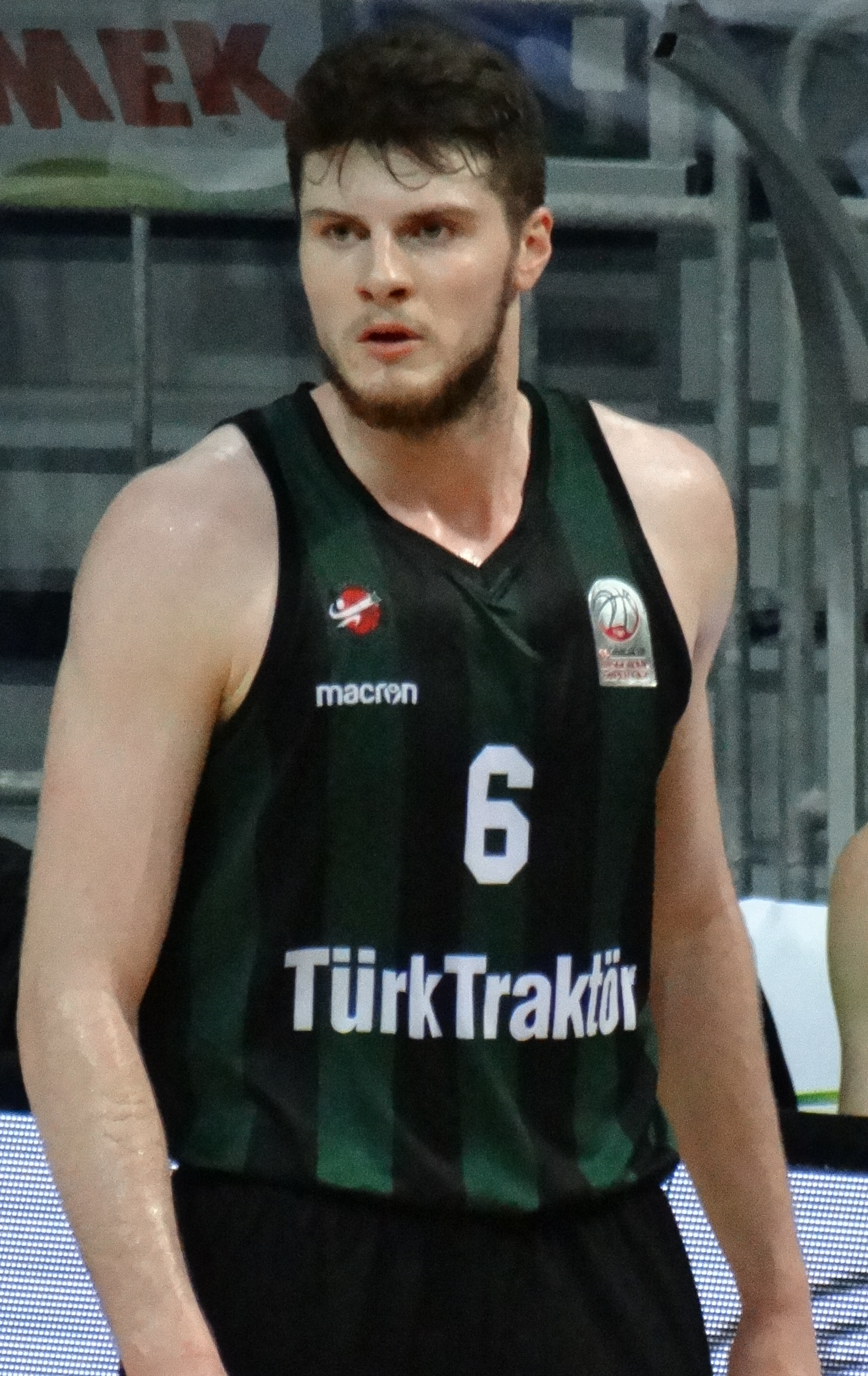
Birsen with Sakarya BB in 2018

=== Anadolu Efes (2018–2019) ===
On 12 June 2018, Birsen was announced by Anadolu Efes, where he signed a 2-year contract.

=== Karşıyaka (2019–2021) ===
On July 17, 2019, he has signed 1-year deal with Karşıyaka of the Turkish Super League.

=== Return to Fenerbahçe (2021–2026) ===
On June 29, 2021, Birsen signed a three-year (2+1) deal with Fenerbahçe of the Turkish Super League and the EuroLeague, returning to the club after six seasons. On May 30, 2023, he renewed his contract through 2026.

=== Beşiktaş (2026–present) ===
On July 3, 2026, he signed with Beşiktaş of the Basketbol Süper Ligi (BSL).

== Turkish national team ==
He has been member of the Turkish Under-16 and Under-18 national team. He won the bronze medal at the 2010 European U-16 Championship.

== Career statistics ==
Legend
GP	Games played	GS	Games started	MPG	Minutes per game
FG%	Field-goal percentage	3P%	3-point field-goal percentage	FT%	Free-throw percentage
RPG	Rebounds per game	APG	Assists per game	SPG	Steals per game
BPG	Blocks per game	PPG	Points per game	PIR	Performance index rating
**Bold**	Career high	†	Won a EuroLeague championship

=== EuroLeague ===
As of match played 1 October 2025

Year	Team	GP	GS	MPG	FG%	3P%	FT%	RPG	APG	SPG	BPG	PPG	PIR
2013–14	Fenerbahçe	8	1	5.5	.286	.000	.500	1.1	—	**.4**	**.1**	0.6	0.5
2018–19	Anadolu Efes	9	1	3.9	**.600**	**.333**	—	.4	**.3**	—	**.1**	1.4	1.4
2021–22	Fenerbahçe	14	0	**7.9**	.250	.222	.333	1.2	**.3**	.1	—	0.9	0.6
2022–23	Fenerbahçe	**28**	**3**	7.7	.345	.323	.667	**1.5**	**.3**	.1	.0	**2.0**	**1.5**
2024–25†	Fenerbahçe	2	0	3.2	.500	—	**1.0**	2.0	—	—	—	**2.0**	2.5
2025–26	Fenerbahçe	1	0	1.2	1.000	.000	1.000	.0	.0	.0	.0	3.0	5.0
Career		62	5	6.4	.429	.289	.600	1.2	.3	.1	.1	1.5	1.2

=== Basketball Champions League ===
Year	Team	GP	GS	MPG	FG%	3P%	FT%	RPG	APG	SPG	BPG	PPG
2020–21	Karşıyaka	14	7	21.8	.432	.300	.800	5.5	.9	.4	.1	6.4
Career		14	7	21.8	.432	.300	.800	5.5	.9	.4	.1	6.4

=== FIBA Europe Cup ===
Year	Team	GP	GS	MPG	FG%	3P%	FT%	RPG	APG	SPG	BPG	PPG
2019–20	Karşıyaka	14	10	22.4	.427	.300	.786	5.4	1.9	.7	.5	8.7
Career		14	10	22.4	.427	.300	.786	5.4	1.9	.7	.5	8.7

=== Domestic leagues ===
†	Denotes seasons in which Birsen won the domestic league

Year	Team	League	GP	MPG	FG%	3P%	FT%	RPG	APG	SPG	BPG	PPG
2011–12	(Turkey) Fenerbahçe	TBL	2	2.7	.000	.000	—	.5	—	—	—	0.0
2012–13	(Turkey) İstanbul BB	TB2L	17	12.6	.478	.250	.613	3.6	.6	.1	.1	5.2
2012–13	(Turkey) Fenerbahçe	TBL	6	4.4	.556	.333	.500	.7	.3	.2	—	2.3
2013–14†	(Turkey) Fenerbahçe	TBL	27	10.7	.488	.382	.613	1.8	.6	.3	.0	4.1
2014–15	(Turkey) Eskişehir	TBL	22	13.7	.419	.182	.667	1.9	.7	.3	.1	3.3
2015–16	(Turkey) İstanbul BB	TBSL	27	13.7	.455	.351	.581	3.0	.5	.4	.1	4.5
2016–17	(Turkey) İstanbul BB	TBSL	22	16.7	.427	.333	.690	2.6	.6	.4	.1	5.9
2017–18	(Turkey) Sakarya BB	TBSL	25	25.6	.432	.171	.706	6.1	2.0	.8	.1	8.3
2018–19†	(Turkey) Anadolu Efes	TBSL	35	13.0	.435	.352	.818	2.7	.7	.4	.1	4.3
2019–20	(Turkey) Karşıyaka	TBSL	23	22.2	.473	.329	.632	4.8	1.6	.7	.1	9.1
2020–21	(Turkey) Karşıyaka	TBSL	32	23.3	.430	.360	.692	5.4	1.3	.4	.1	8.9
2021–22†	(Turkey) Fenerbahçe	TBSL	41	16.3	.449	.300	.780	2.9	.9	.5	.0	5.3
2022–23	(Turkey) Fenerbahçe	TBSL	22	22.2	.446	.397	.548	4.9	1.1	1.0	.1	6.4
2023–24†	(Turkey) Fenerbahçe	TBSL	17	9.1	.276	.091	.286	2.1	.4	.1	.1	1.1

== Personal life ==
He was born to a Turkish father and an Irish mother.
