= Berk Uğurlu =

Turkish professional basketball player (born 1996)

Berk İbrahim Uğurlu
- Uğurlu with Beşiktaş in 2026

No. 6 – Beşiktaş Fuzul
- Position: Point guard
- League: BSL; EuroLeague

Personal information
- Born: 27 April 1996 (age 30) Şişli, Istanbul, Turkey
- Listed height: 6 ft 3.75 in (1.92 m)
- Listed weight: 192 lb (87 kg)

Career information
- Playing career: 2012–present

Career history
- 2012–2018: Fenerbahçe
- 2017–2018: →Pınar Karşıyaka
- 2018–2019: Pınar Karşıyaka
- 2019–2023: Tofaş
- 2023–present: Beşiktaş

Career highlights
- EuroLeague champion (2017); BSL Skills Challenge champion (2016); 3× Turkish League champion (2014, 2016, 2017); 2× Turkish Cup winner (2013, 2016); 2× Turkish President's Cup winner (2013, 2016)
Medals
Men's basketball
Representing Turkey
FIBA Europe Under-20 Championship
Bronze medal – third place	2015 Italy	U-20 Team
Bronze medal – third place	2016 Finland	U-20 Team
FIBA Under-19 World Championship
Bronze medal – third place	2015 Greece	U-19 Team
FIBA Europe Under-18 Championship
Gold medal – first place	2013 Latvia	U-18 Team
Gold medal – first place	2014 Turkey	U-18 Team
FIBA Europe Under-16 Championship
Gold medal – first place	2012 Latvia & Lithuania	U-16 Team

Berk İbrahim Uğurlu (born 27 April 1996) is a Turkish professional basketball player for Beşiktaş of the Basketbol Süper Ligi (BSL). Standing at 1.92 m (6 ft. 3 3/4 in.), and weighing 87 kg (192 lbs.), he plays at the point guard position.

== Professional career ==
Uğurlu signed first professional contract with the Turkish club Fenerbahçe in 2012. On 23 February 2014, in a Turkish Super League win over Aliağa Petkim, he helped his team to win the game, with a 4 points, 8 assists, 3 rebounds, and 3 steals performance.

On 3 July 2017 Uğurlu was loaned to Pınar Karşıyaka for the 2017–18 season.

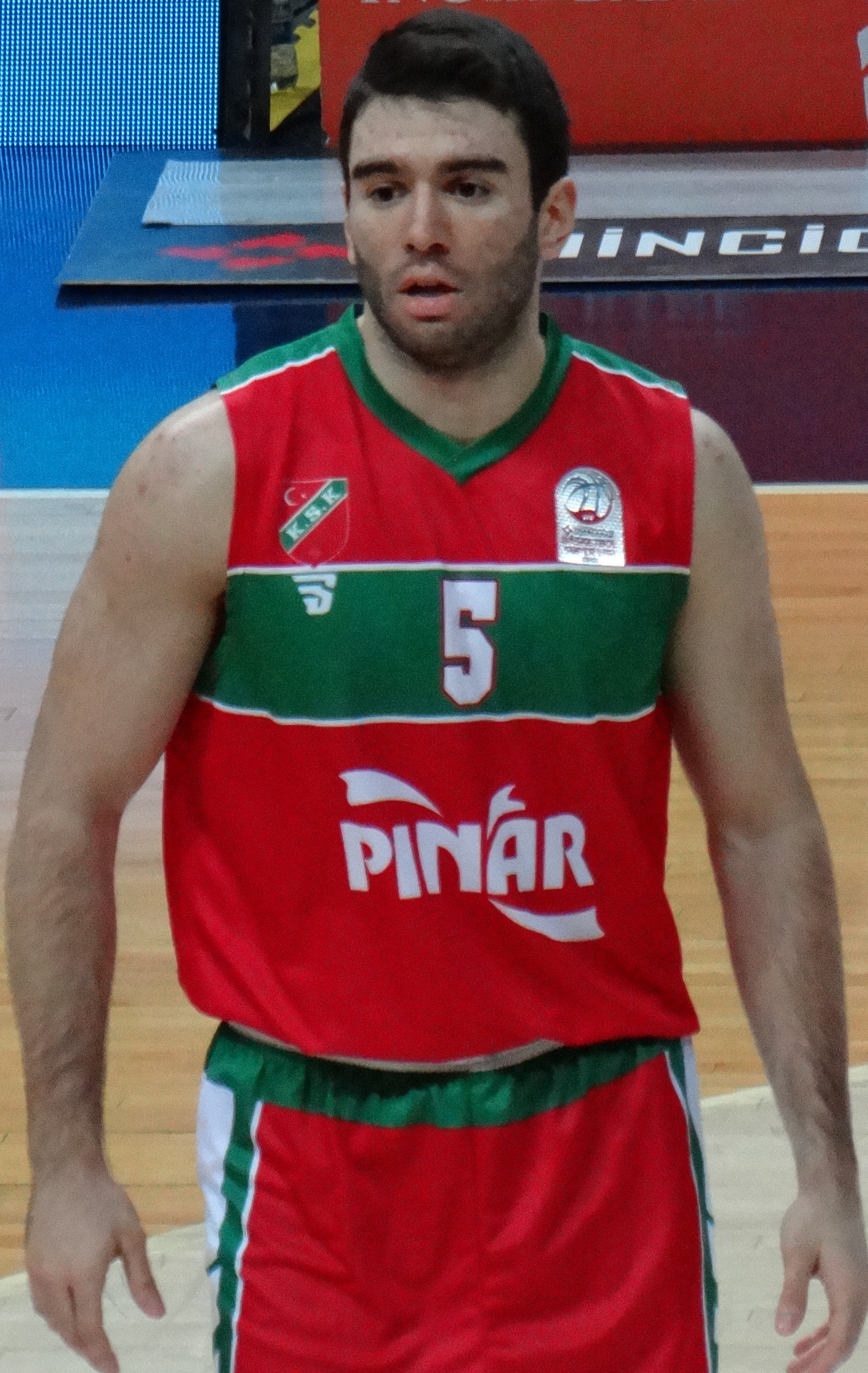
Berk with Karşıyaka jersey in 2018

On 25 June 2019 he signed a 3-year contract with Tofaş of the Turkish Basketball Super League (BSL).

On 27 June 2023 he signed with Beşiktaş of the Turkish Basketbol Süper Ligi (BSL) for a second stint.

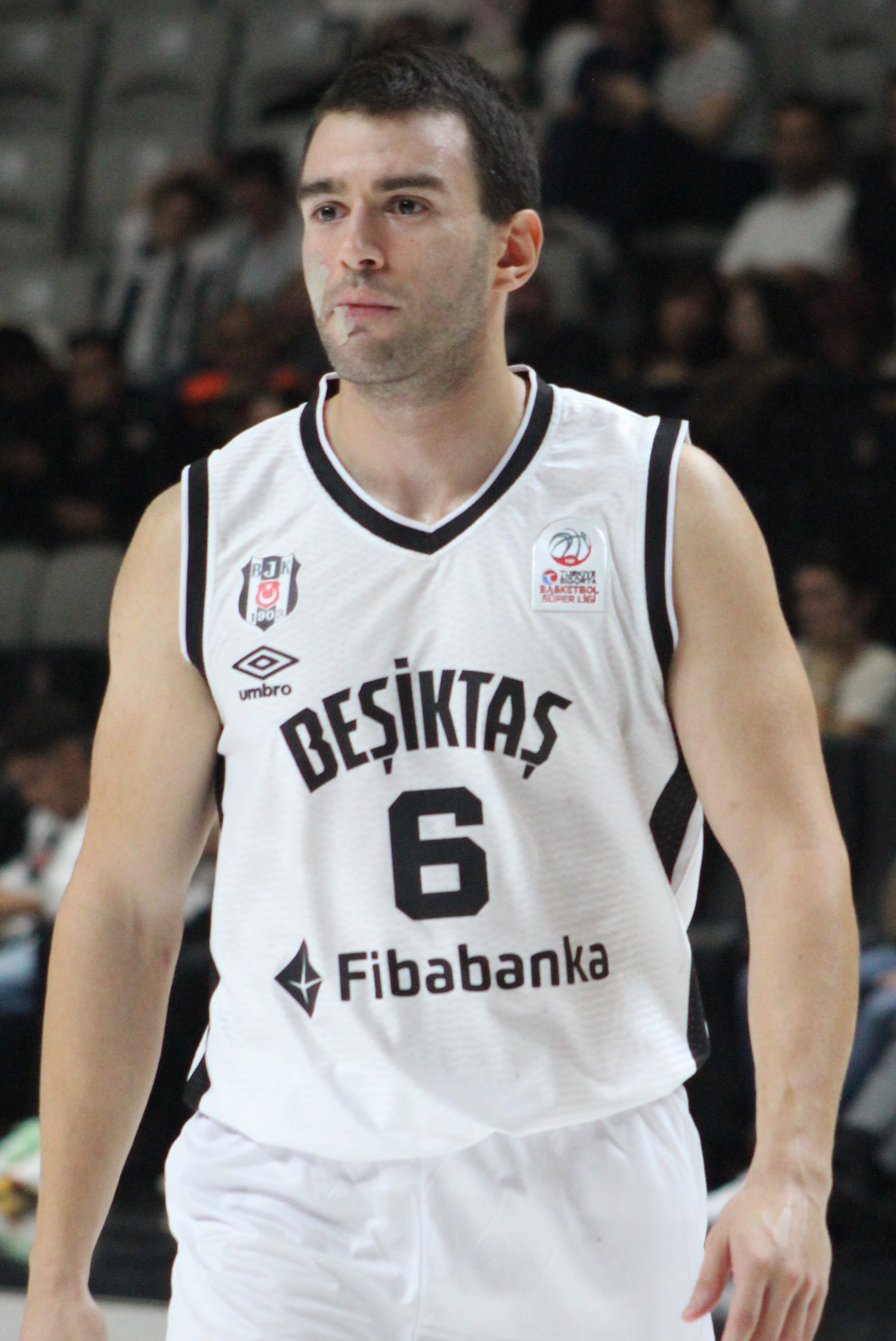

== Turkish national team ==
Uğurlu was a member of the Turkish junior national teams. While playing for Turkey's junior national teams, he won gold medals at the following tournaments: the 2012 FIBA Europe Under-16 Championship, the 2013 FIBA Europe Under-18 Championship, and the 2014 FIBA Europe Under-18 Championship. He also one Bronze medals at the 2015 FIBA Under-19 World Championship, the 2015 FIBA Europe Under-20 Championship, and the 2016 FIBA Europe Under-20 Championship.

== Career statistics ==
Legend
GP	Games played	GS	Games started	MPG	Minutes per game
FG%	Field-goal percentage	3P%	3-point field-goal percentage	FT%	Free-throw percentage
RPG	Rebounds per game	APG	Assists per game	SPG	Steals per game
BPG	Blocks per game	PPG	Points per game	PIR	Performance index rating
**Bold**	Career high

=== EuroLeague ===
†	Denotes seasons in which Uğurlu won the EuroLeague

Year	Team	GP	GS	MPG	FG%	3P%	FT%	RPG	APG	SPG	BPG	PPG	PIR
2013–14	Fenerbahçe	1	0	**30.0**	**.750**	.000	—	**4.0**	**7.0**	**1.0**	—	**12.0**	**20.0**
2014–15	Fenerbahçe	3	0	5.3	.200	.000	.000	—	—	.3	—	0.7	-1.7
2015–16	Fenerbahçe	**14**	**1**	7.6	.577	**.400**	.571	.4	.9	.3	.1	2.6	2.6
2016–17†	Fenerbahçe	7	0	4.3	.000	.000	**1.000**	.1	.3	.1	—	0.3	-0.9
Career		25	1	7.4	.478	.200	.600	.4	.8	.3	.1	2.1	1.8
