= 2026–27 Fenerbahçe S.K. (basketball) season =

113th season

Fenerbahçe Tarfin
2026–27 season
- President: Aziz Yıldırım
- Head coach: Šarūnas Jasikevičius
- Arena: Ülker Sports and Event Hall
- Basketbol Süper Ligi: Regular season
- EuroLeague: Regular season
- Presidential Cup: Champions
- EuroLeague SuperCup: 3rd place
Home	Away	Third

The 2026–27 season will be Fenerbahçe's 113th season in the existence of the club. The team will play in the Basketbol Süper Ligi and in the EuroLeague.

== Players ==
=== Squad information ===
Note: Flags indicate national team eligibility at FIBA-sanctioned events. Players may hold other non-FIBA nationalities not displayed.

Fenerbahçe Tarfin roster
Players
Coaches

Pos.	No.	Nat.	Name	Ht.	Wt.	Age
G	0	(Turkey)	Larkin, Shane	1.82 m (6 ft 0 in)	79 kg (174 lb)	34 – 2 October 1992
F/C	1	(United States)	Bingham Jr., Marcus	2.12 m (6 ft 11 in)	104 kg (229 lb)	26 – 14 July 2000
G	2	(United States)	Baldwin IV, Wade	1.93 m (6 ft 4 in)	91 kg (201 lb)	30 – 29 March 1996
F/C	4	(Italy)	Melli, Nicolò (injured)	2.05 m (6 ft 9 in)	110 kg (243 lb)	35 – 26 January 1991
C	5	(Turkey)	Şanlı, Sertaç	2.14 m (7 ft 0 in)	115 kg (254 lb)	35 – 5 August 1991
G/F	8	(United States)	Horton-Tucker, Talen	1.93 m (6 ft 4 in)	106 kg (234 lb)	25 – 25 November 2000
G/F	9	(United States)	Juzang, Johnny	2.01 m (6 ft 7 in)	103 kg (227 lb)	25 – 17 March 2001
SG	10	(Turkey)	Mahmutoğlu, Melih (C)	1.91 m (6 ft 3 in)	85 kg (187 lb)	36 – 12 May 1990
G	11	(United States)	Forrest, Trent	1.96 m (6 ft 5 in)	95 kg (209 lb)	28 – 12 June 1998
F	12	(United States)	Key, Braxton (injured)	2.03 m (6 ft 8 in)	102 kg (225 lb)	29 – 14 February 1997
F	14	(Turkey)	Yancı, Kadir Yiğit	2.00 m (6 ft 7 in)	87 kg (192 lb)	21 – 30 October 2005
F/C	16	(Canada)	Powell, Dwight	2.11 m (6 ft 11 in)	109 kg (240 lb)	35 – 20 July 1991
G/F	17	(Turkey)	Bitim, Onuralp	1.96 m (6 ft 5 in)	98 kg (216 lb)	27 – 31 March 1999
F	21	(United States)	Clyburn, Will	2.01 m (6 ft 7 in)	95 kg (209 lb)	36 – 17 May 1990
G/F	31	(Denmark)	Shields, Shavon	2.01 m (6 ft 7 in)	100 kg (220 lb)	32 – 5 June 1994
G	43	(Lithuania)	Sargiūnas, Ignas	1.93 m (6 ft 4 in)	86 kg (190 lb)	27 – 11 September 1999
G/F	73	(Turkey)	Yancı, Doruk Alp (Y)	1.91 m (6 ft 3 in)	84 kg (185 lb)	18 – 4 June 2008
G/F	77	(Turkey)	Demir, Demircan	1.90 m (6 ft 3 in)	79 kg (174 lb)	22 – 15 June 2004

Head coach

- (Lithuania) Šarūnas Jasikevičius

Assistant coach(es)

- (Turkey) Ertuğrul Erdoğan
- (Lithuania) Kazys Maksvytis
- (Spain) David Garcia
- (Turkey) Alp Timuçin Yener

Athletic trainer(s)

- (Lithuania) Mantas Valčiukaitis
- (Turkey) İlker Belgutay

Physiotherapist(s)

- (Turkey) Rıza Özdemir
- (Spain) Jaime Capellá Bouza
- (Turkey) Ebru Kaplan

Team manager

- (Turkey) Cenk Renda

Legend

- (C) Team captain
- (IN) Inactive
- (L) On loan
- (Y) Youth player
- Injured

- Roster
Updated: 13 November 2026

=== EuroLeague Depth chart ===
Pos.	Starting 5	Bench 1	Bench 2	Bench 3	Inactive
C	Dwight Powell	Marcus Bingham Jr.	Sertaç Şanlı		Nicolò Melli (injured)
PF	Shavon Shields	Will Clyburn		Kadir Yiğit Yancı	Braxton Key (injured)
SF	Johnny Juzang	Talen Horton-Tucker		Onuralp Bitim
SG	Trent Forrest	Ignas Sargiūnas	Melih Mahmutoğlu	Demircan Demir
PG	Shane Larkin	Wade Baldwin IV		Doruk Alp Yancı

=== BSL Depth chart ===
Pos.	Starting 5	Bench 1	Bench 2	Bench 3	Inactive
C	Dwight Powell*	Marcus Bingham Jr.*	Sertaç Şanlı		Nicolò Melli* (injured)
PF	Shavon Shields*	Will Clyburn*		Kadir Yiğit Yancı	Braxton Key* (injured)
SF	Onuralp Bitim	Talen Horton-Tucker*		Demircan Demir
SG	Trent Forrest*	Melih Mahmutoğlu		Johnny Juzang*
PG	Shane Larkin	Wade Baldwin IV*	Doruk Alp Yancı	Ignas Sargiūnas*

- BSL requires a maximum of 7 registered foreign players per squad, with no more than 4 foreign players allowed on the court at any given time. Crucially, at least 1 Turkish player must remain on the floor during every second of game play. Foreign players are shown with an asterisk (*).

=== Transactions ===
==== In ====
No.	Pos.	Nat.	Name	Age	Moving from		Contract	Ends	Date	Source
11	G	(United States)	Trent Forrest	28	Baskonia	(Spain)	June 2028	8 July 2026		
31	F	(Denmark) (United States)	Shavon Shields	32	Olimpia Milano	(Italy)	June 2028	9 July 2026		
12	PF	(United States)	Braxton Key	29	Valencia Basket	(Spain)	June 2028	11 July 2026		
0	PG	(Turkey) (United States)	Shane Larkin	33	Anadolu Efes	(Turkey)	June 2028	13 July 2026		
5	C	(Turkey)	Sertaç Şanlı	34	Beşiktaş	(Turkey)	June 2027	14 July 2026		
43	G	(Lithuania)	Ignas Sargiūnas	26	Rytas Vilnius	(Lithuania)	June 2028	14 July 2026		
1	C	(United States)	Marcus Bingham Jr.	26	UNICS Kazan	(Russia)	June 2028	16 July 2026		
21	F	(United States)	Will Clyburn	36	FC Barcelona	(Spain)	June 2027	17 July 2026		
9	G/F	(United States)	Johnny Juzang	25	Zenit Saint Petersburg	(Russia)	June 2027	27 July 2026		
16	F/C	(Canada)	Dwight Powell	35	Dallas Mavericks	(United States)	June 2027	27 July 2026		

==== Out ====
No.	Pos.	Nat.	Name	Age	Moving to		Date	Source
12	PG	(France)	Nando de Colo	38	Retired		20 June 2026	
92	C	(Canada)	Khem Birch	33	Aris Thessaloniki	(Greece)	23 June 2026	
20	G/F	(United States)	Devon Hall	30	Olimpia Milano	(Italy)	23 June 2026	
11	G/F	(United States)	Brandon Boston Jr.	24	Trabzonspor	(Turkey)	25 June 2026	
44	F/C	(Angola)	Jilson Bango	27	Zaragoza	(Spain)	25 June 2026	
00	C	(United States)	Armando Bacot	26	Maccabi Tel Aviv	(Israel)	6 August 2026	
32	G	(Latvia)	Artūrs Žagars	25	Zhejiang Golden Bulls	(China)	25 June 2026	
50	SF	(United States)	Bonzie Colson	30	Maccabi Tel Aviv	(Israel)	28 June 2026	
1	F/C	(Turkey) (Republic of Ireland)	Metecan Birsen	31	Beşiktaş	(Turkey)	1 July 2026	
13	SF	(Turkey) (Bosnia and Herzegovina)	Tarik Biberović	25	Dallas Mavericks	(United States)	9 July 2026	
18	PF	(Finland)	Mikael Jantunen	26	Real Madrid	(Spain)	11 July 2026	
5	PG	(Turkey)	Mert Emre Ekşioğlu	24	Körfez Basket	(Turkey)	8 August 2026	
30	C	(Gabon)	Chris Silva	30	Partizan	(Serbia)	13 November 2026	

==== Contract renewals ====
No.	Pos.	Nat.	Name	Age	Cont.	Date	Source
4	PF	(Italy) (United States)	Nicolò Melli	35	2-year	7 July 2026	
8	SG	(United States)	Talen Horton-Tucker	25	1-year	7 July 2026	
30	C	(Gabon)	Chris Silva	29	2-year	7 July 2026	
10	SG	(Turkey)	Melih Mahmutoğlu	36	1-year	21 July 2026	

== Pre-season and friendlies ==
=== Friendly matches ===
29 August 2026 Friendly	Glint Körfez Basket (Turkish Basketball Federation)	82–70	(Turkish Basketball Federation) Fenerbahçe Tarfin	Kocaeli
16:00 TRT (UTC+3)	Scoring by quarter: 24–16, 22–21, 18–14, 18–19
	Pts: Davis 23	Boxscore	Pts: Juzang 13	Arena: Şehit Polis Recep Topaloğlu Sports Hall; Referees: Fatih Arslanoğlu, Kerem Yılmaz, Fatih Güler

1 September 2026 Friendly	Fenerbahçe Tarfin (Turkish Basketball Federation)	83–78	(Turkish Basketball Federation) Tofaş	Istanbul
19:00 TRT (UTC+3)	Scoring by quarter: 16–16, 21–19, 22–17, 24–26
	Pts: Juzang 15	Boxscore	Pts: Thurman 19	Arena: Ülker Sports and Event Hall

4 September 2026 Basketball Tournament Crete	Olympiacos (Hellenic Basketball Federation)	82–77	(Turkish Basketball Federation) Fenerbahçe Tarfin	Heraklion, Crete
21:00 EEST (UTC+3)	Scoring by quarter: 17–21, 17–16, 23–21, 25–19
	Pts: Fournier 19; Rebs: Hall 8 Asts: Ward 5	Boxscore	Pts: Baldwin 16; Rebs: Bingham 9 Asts: Baldwin 5	Arena: Heraklion Arena

6 September 2026 Basketball Tournament Crete	Armani Olimpia Milan (Italian Basketball Federation)	79–81	(Turkish Basketball Federation) Fenerbahçe Tarfin	Heraklion, Crete
18:00 EEST (UTC+3)	Scoring by quarter: 19–28, 21–15, 20–17, 19–21
	Pts: Wright 20; Rebs: Peters 11; Asts: Cole 7	Boxscore	Pts: Clyburn 13	Arena: Heraklion Arena

9 September 2026 Friendly	Fenerbahçe Tarfin (Turkish Basketball Federation)	Canceled	(Turkish Basketball Federation) Esenler Erokspor	Istanbul
				Arena: Ülker Sports and Event Hall

13 September 2026 Friendly	Fenerbahçe Tarfin (Turkish Basketball Federation)	102–66	(Bulgarian Basketball Federation) Balkan Botevgrad	Istanbul
19:00 TRT (UTC+3)	Scoring by quarter: 31–18, 31–23, 23–15, 17–10
	Pts: Clyburn 16	Boxscore		Arena: Metro Enerji Sports Hall

== Overview ==
Competition	First match	Last match	Starting round	Final position	Record							
Competition	First match	Last match	Starting round	Final position	Pld	W	D	L	PF	PA	PD	Win %
Basketbol Süper Ligi	27 September 2026	TBD	Round 1		9	6	0	3	773	724	+49	66.67
EuroLeague	25 September 2026	TBD	Round 1		13	8	0	5	1,080	1,005	+75	61.54
EuroLeague SuperCup	18 September 2026	19 September 2026	Semifinals	3rd	1	0	0	1	175	169	+6	0.00
Presidential Cup	22 September 2026		Final	Winners	1	1	0	0	72	59	+13	100.00
Total					24	15	0	9	2,100	1,957	+143	62.50

Last updated: 22 November 2026
Source: Competitions

=== Presidential Cup ===
Presidential Cup championship ceremony

22 September 2026	Fenerbahçe Tarfin	72–59	Beşiktaş	Istanbul
20:00 TRT (UTC+3)	Scoring by quarter: 21–10, 25–17, 12–19, 14–13
	Pts: Baldwin 13; Rebs: Forrest, Key 7 Asts: Baldwin 6 PIR: Shields 14	Boxscore	Pts: Nowell 13; Rebs: Žižić 8 Asts: Wilbekin 4 PIR: Žižić 12	Arena: Sinan Erdem Dome; Referees: Özlem Yalman, Alper Altuğ Köselerli, Kaan Büyükçil

=== EuroLeague SuperCup ===
18 September 2026 Semifinal	Olympiacos (Greece)	92–90	(Turkey) Fenerbahçe Tarfin	Abu Dhabi
18:00 GST (UTC+4)	Scoring by quarter: 20–25, 23–20, 26–33, 23–12
	Pts: Fournier 19; Rebs: Hall 12; Asts: Miller-McIntyre 4 PIR: Hall 21	Boxscore	Pts: Shields 18; Rebs: Key 6 Asts: Baldwin IV, Clyburn 4 PIR: Key 31	Arena: Etihad Arena; Referees: Robert Lottermoser, Emilio Perez Pizarro, Luka Kardum

19 September 2026 Third place	Fenerbahçe Tarfin (Turkey)	85–77	(United Arab Emirates) Dubai Basketball	Abu Dhabi
18:00 GST (UTC+4)	Scoring by quarter: 22–21, 25–18, 17–26, 21–12
	Pts: Horton-Tucker 23; Rebs: Melli 4 Asts: Sargiūnas 4 PIR: Horton-Tucker 28	Boxscore	Pts: Okobo, Bertāns 14; Rebs: Okobo, Blossomgame 6 Asts: Wright, Walkup 6 PIR: Blossomgame 13	Arena: Etihad Arena; Referees: Emilio Pérez, Kristaps Konstantinovs, Thomas Bissuel

=== Basketbol Süper Ligi ===
==== League table ====
Pos	Team	Pld	W	L	PF	PA	PD	Pts	Qualification or relegation
2	Türk Telekom	9	7	2	764	678	+86	16	Advance to playoffs
3	Anadolu Efes	9	6	3	754	703	+51	15	Advance to playoffs
4	Fenerbahçe Tarfin	9	6	3	773	724	+49	15	Advance to playoffs
5	Galatasaray MCT Technic	9	5	4	782	702	+80	14	Advance to playoffs
6	Beşiktaş Fuzul	9	5	4	757	763	−6	14	Advance to playoffs

Updated to match(es) played on 22 November 2026. Source: Basketbol Süper Ligi

==== Results summary ====
Overall						Home					Away				
Pld	W	L	PF	PA	PD	W	L	PF	PA	PD	W	L	PF	PA	PD
9	6	3	773	724	+49	3	1	327	318	+9	3	2	446	406	+40

Last updated: 22 November 2026.
Source: TBF.org.tr

==== Results by round ====
Round	1	2	3	4	5	6	7	8	9	10	11	12	13	14	15	16	17	18	19	20	21	22	23	24	25	26	27	28	29	30
Ground	A	H	A	H	A	H	A	H	A	H	A	H	A	H	A	H	A	H	A	H	A	H	A	H	A	H	A	H	A	H
Result	L	W	W	L	W	W	W	W	L																					
Position	15	13	6	9	5	4	3	3	4																					

Updated to match(es) played on 22 November 2026. Source: TBF.org.tr
A = Away; H = Home; W = Win; L = Loss

==== Matches ====
Note: All times are TRT (UTC+3) as listed by Turkish Basketball Federation.

27 September 2026 1	Bahçeşehir Koleji	98–83	Fenerbahçe Tarfin	Istanbul
18:00	Scoring by quarter: 28–16, 23–27, 23–22, 24–18
	Pts: Flynn 17; Rebs: Williams 14; Asts: Flynn, Reed 5 PIR: Williams 29	Boxscore	Pts: Horton-Tucker 16; Rebs: Shields 7 Asts: Baldwin IV 6 PIR: Shields 19	Arena: Sinan Erdem Dome; Attendance: 6,785; Referees: Hüseyin Çelik, Fatih Arslanoğlu, Ayşe Nur Yazıcıoğlu

4 October 2026 2	Fenerbahçe Tarfin	85–84	Biotekno Körfez Basket	Istanbul
15:30	Scoring by quarter: 25–18, 20–26, 23–11, 17–29
	Pts: Horton-Tucker 22; Rebs: Juzang 7 Asts: Horton-Tucker 3 PIR: Juzang 30	Boxscore	Pts: Barna 18; Rebs: Cluff, Reese 5 Asts: Davis 4 PIR: Barna 19	Arena: Ülker Sports and Event Hall; Attendance: Yener Yılmaz, Nazlı Çişil Göngör, Berk Kurtulmuş; Referees: 2,504

10 October 2026 3	Glint Çayırova Belediyesi	85–100	Fenerbahçe Tarfin	Çayırova, Kocaeli
20:30	Scoring by quarter: 16–23, 23–32, 27–22, 19–23
	Pts: Gallinat 23; Rebs: White Jr. 8 Asts: Crawford 7 PIR: Gallinat 16	Boxscore	Pts: Clyburn 18; Rebs: Şanlı 7 Asts: Key 4 PIR: Şanlı 19	Arena: Çayırova Municipality Sports Complex; Attendance: 3,500; Referees: Can Mavisu, Duhan Köyiçi, Batuhan Söylemezoğlu

18 October 2026 4	Fenerbahçe Tarfin	77–82	Petkim Spor	Istanbul
15:30	Scoring by quarter: 12–24, 21–15, 18–19, 26–24
	Pts: Horton-Tucker 17; Rebs: Melli 10; Asts: 5 players 3 PIR: Melli 21	Boxscore	Pts: Abmas 18; Rebs: Uthoff 9 Asts: Horton 4 PIR: Abmas, Horton 17	Arena: Ülker Sports and Event Hall; Attendance: 2,659; Referees: Emin Moğulkoç, Alper Özgök, Samet Biner

25 October 2026 5	Karşıyaka Basket	72–97	Fenerbahçe Tarfin	İzmir
15:30	Scoring by quarter: 16–25, 20–24, 14–25, 22–23
	Pts: El-Amin 22; Rebs: Enoch, Gültekin 4 Asts: Weber 7 PIR: El-Amin 20	Boxscore	Pts: Sargiūnas 22; Rebs: Key 7 Asts: Forrest, Horton-Tucker 4 PIR: Sargiūnas 22	Arena: Karşıyaka Arena; Attendance: 5,500; Referees: Ahmet Tatlıcı, Alper Altuğ Köselerli, Ziya Özorhon

1 November 2026 6	Fenerbahçe Tarfin	88–77	Tofaş	Istanbul
15:30	Scoring by quarter: 25–21, 22–22, 23–16, 18–18
	Pts: Horton-Tucker 18; Rebs: Key 6 Asts: Forrest, Key 4 PIR: Key 28	Boxscore	Pts: Jones 20; Rebs: Kabaca, Thurman 4 Asts: Jones 8 PIR: Jones 21	Arena: Ülker Sports and Event Hall; Attendance: 2,438; Referees: Yener Yılmaz, Kerem Baki, Berk Kurtulmuş

7 November 2026 7	Bursaspor	59–78	Fenerbahçe Tarfin	Bursa
20:30	Scoring by quarter: 15–23, 21–20, 11–16, 12–19
	Pts: Moore 20; Rebs: Washington 8 Asts: Taylor 8 PIR: Moore 22	Boxscore	Pts: Bitim 19; Rebs: Melli 7 Asts: Forrest 5 PIR: Bitim 19	Arena: Tofaş Nilüfer Spor Salonu; Attendance: 4,680; Referees: Hüseyin Çelik, Özge Şentürk Bayraktar, Uğur Akyıldız

15 November 2026 8	Fenerbahçe Tarfin	77–75	Anadolu Efes	Istanbul
20:30	Scoring by quarter: 18–32, 17–11, 25–11, 17–21
	Pts: Clyburn 13; Rebs: Clyburn 7 Asts: Forrest 4 PIR: Powell 19	Boxscore	Pts: Osmani 18; Rebs: Loyd 5 Asts: Šarić 5 PIR: Osmani 22	Arena: Ülker Sports and Event Hall; Attendance: 8,583; Referees: Mehmet Karabilecen, Tolga Akkuşoğlu, Kerem Yılmaz

22 November 2026 9	Beşiktaş	92–88	Fenerbahçe Tarfin	Istanbul
20:30	Scoring by quarter: 29–18, 25–17, 19–19, 19–34
	Pts: Wilbekin 21; Rebs: Korkmaz 6 Asts: Uğurlu 6 PIR: Wilbekin 16	Boxscore	Pts: Horton-Tucker 34; Rebs: Horton-Tucker 8 Asts: Baldwin IV, Larkin 3 PIR: Horton-Tucker 32	Arena: Basketball Development Center; Attendance: 6,379; Referees: Zafer Yılmaz, Alper Özgök, Batuhan Söylemezoğlu

6 December 2026 10	Fenerbahçe Tarfin	vs.	Trabzonspor	Istanbul
13:00
		Boxscore		Arena: Ülker Sports and Event Hall

12 December 2026 11	Pizzabulls Bandırma Bordo	vs.	Fenerbahçe Tarfin	Bandırma, Balıkesir
13:00
		Boxscore		Arena: Bandırma 17 Eylül Üniversitesi Spor Salonu

20 December 2026 12	Fenerbahçe Tarfin	vs.	Türk Telekom	Istanbul
13:00
		Boxscore		Arena: Ülker Sports and Event Hall

December 2026 13	Yukatel Denizli Basket	vs.	Fenerbahçe Tarfin	Denizli
		Boxscore		Arena: Pamukkale University Arena

January 2027 14	Fenerbahçe Tarfin	vs.	Galatasaray MCT Technic	Istanbul
		Boxscore		Arena: Ülker Sports and Event Hall

January 2027 15	Esenler Erokspor	vs.	Fenerbahçe Tarfin	Istanbul
		Boxscore		Arena: Akatlar Arena

January 2027 16	Fenerbahçe Tarfin	vs.	Bahçeşehir Koleji	Istanbul
		Boxscore		Arena: Ülker Sports and Event Hall

January 2027 17	Biotekno Körfez Basket	vs.	Fenerbahçe Tarfin	Kocaeli
		Boxscore		Arena: Şehit Polis Recep Topaloğlu Sports Hall

January 2027 18	Fenerbahçe Tarfin	vs.	Glint Çayırova Belediyesi	Istanbul
		Boxscore		Arena: Ülker Sports and Event Hall

February 2027 19	Petkim Spor	vs.	Fenerbahçe Tarfin	Aliağa, İzmir
		Boxscore		Arena: Enka Sport Hall

February 2027 20	Fenerbahçe Tarfin	vs.	Karşıyaka Basket	Istanbul
		Boxscore		Arena: Ülker Sports and Event Hall

March 2027 21	Tofaş	vs.	Fenerbahçe Tarfin	Bursa
		Boxscore		Arena: Tofaş Nilüfer Spor Salonu

March 2027 22	Fenerbahçe Tarfin	vs.	Bursaspor Yörsan	Istanbul
		Boxscore		Arena: Ülker Sports and Event Hall

March 2027 23	Anadolu Efes	vs.	Fenerbahçe Tarfin	Istanbul
		Boxscore		Arena: Basketball Development Center

March 2027 24	Fenerbahçe Tarfin	vs.	Beşiktaş	Istanbul
		Boxscore		Arena: Ülker Sports and Event Hall

April 2027 25	Trabzonspor	vs.	Fenerbahçe Tarfin	Trabzon
		Boxscore		Arena: Hayri Gür Arena

April 2027 26	Fenerbahçe Tarfin	vs.	Pizzabulls Bandırma Bordo	Istanbul
		Boxscore		Arena: Ülker Sports and Event Hall

April 2027 27	Türk Telekom	vs.	Fenerbahçe Tarfin	Ankara
		Boxscore		Arena: Ankara Arena

April 2027 28	Fenerbahçe Tarfin	vs.	Yukatel Denizli Basket	Istanbul
		Boxscore		Arena: Ülker Sports and Event Hall

May 2027 29	Galatasaray MCT Technic	vs.	Fenerbahçe Tarfin	Istanbul
		Boxscore		Arena: Sinan Erdem Dome

May 2027 30	Fenerbahçe Tarfin	vs.	Esenler Erokspor	Istanbul
		Boxscore		Arena: Ülker Sports and Event Hall

=== EuroLeague ===
==== League table ====
The regular season will begin on 24 September 2026 and conclude on 16 April 2027. The 20 teams will play against each other home-and-away in a round-robin format over 38 rounds where only 10 teams will advance to the postseason. Moreover, the top six teams from regular season will receive a bye to the playoffs, while the teams placed from 7th to 10th will participate in the play-in to get the last two playoff spots. At the tail end of the standings, teams placed from 11th to 20th will be eliminated after the regular season.

Pos	Team	Pld	W	L	PF	PA	PD	Qualification
3	(Hellenic Basketball Federation) Panathinaikos AKTOR	13	9	4	1102	1008	+94	Qualification to playoffs
4	(United Arab Emirates Basketball Association) Dubai Basketball	13	9	4	1112	1091	+21	Qualification to playoffs
5	(Turkish Basketball Federation) Fenerbahçe Tarfin	13	8	5	1080	1005	+75	Qualification to playoffs
6	(Basketball Federation of Serbia) Crvena zvezda Meridianbet	13	8	5	1071	1021	+50	Qualification to playoffs
7	(Spanish Basketball Federation) Barcelona	13	8	5	1149	1122	+27	Qualification to play-in

Updated to match(es) played on 20 November 2026. Source: EuroLeague
Rules for classification: Regular season tiebreakers

==== Results summary ====
Overall						Home					Away				
Pld	W	L	PF	PA	PD	W	L	PF	PA	PD	W	L	PF	PA	PD
13	8	5	1080	1005	+75	7	0	626	501	+125	1	5	454	504	−50

Last updated: 19 November 2026.
Source: EuroLeague

==== Results by round ====
Round	1	2	3	4	5	6	7	8	9	10	11	12	13	14	15	16	17	18	19	20	21	22	23	24	25	26	27	28	29	30	31	32	33	34	35	36	37	38
Ground	H	H	H	A	H	H	A	A	A	H	A	H	A	A	H	H	H	H	A	H	A	A	A	H	H	A	A	H	A	A	H	H	A	H	A	H	A	A
Result	W	W	W	L	W	W	W	L	L	W	L	W	L																									
Position	5	2	2	4	3	2	2	4	7	4	7	3	5																									

Updated to match(es) played on 21 November 2026. Source: EuroLeague.net
A = Away; H = Home; W = Win; L = Loss; P = Postponed

==== Matches ====
Note: All times, from 25 October 2026 to 28 March 2027, are CET (UTC+1); up to 25 October 2026 and from 28 March 2027, are CEST (UTC+2) as listed by EuroLeague.

25 September 2026 1	Fenerbahçe Tarfin (Turkish Basketball Federation)	78–68	(Italian Basketball Federation) Virtus Bologna	Istanbul
19:45	Scoring by quarter: 23–17, 16–21, 20–17, 19–13
	Pts: Horton-Tucker 13; Rebs: Key 10; Asts: Baldwin IV 6 PIR: Key 22	Boxscore	Pts: Carr 12; Rebs: Edwards, Moore Jr. 7 Asts: Carr 4 PIR: Edwards 12	Arena: Ülker Sports and Event Hall; Attendance: 8,850; Referees: Juan Carlos García, Milivoje Jovčić, Stefan Ćalić

29 September 2026 2	Fenerbahçe Tarfin (Turkish Basketball Federation)	100–76	(German Basketball Federation) Bayern Munich	Istanbul
19:45	Scoring by quarter: 31–15, 19–16, 25–20, 25–25
	Pts: Horton-Tucker 19; Rebs: Key, Horton-Tucker 5 Asts: Baldwin IV 8 PIR: Horton-Tucker 25	Boxscore	Pts: Washington 20; Rebs: three players 5 Asts: Beauchamp, Jokubaitis 3 PIR: Washington 16	Arena: Ülker Sports and Event Hall; Attendance: 8,133; Referees: Tomislav Hordov, Sašo Petek, Maxime Boubert

2 October 2026 3	Fenerbahçe Tarfin (Turkish Basketball Federation)	76–66	(United Arab Emirates Basketball Association) Dubai Basketball	Istanbul
19:45	Scoring by quarter: 26–14, 16–25, 13–12, 21–15
	Pts: Bingham 20; Rebs: Bingham, Key 8 Asts: Baldwin IV 5 PIR: Bingham 25	Boxscore	Pts: Okobo 18; Rebs: Kabengele 12; Asts: Okobo 4 PIR: Kabengele 13	Arena: Ülker Sports and Event Hall; Attendance: 8,497; Referees: Emilio Pérez, Robert Lottermoser, Jordi Aliaga

8 October 2026 4	Panathinaikos AKTOR (Hellenic Basketball Federation)	92–74	(Turkish Basketball Federation) Fenerbahçe Tarfin	Marousi, Athens
20:15	Scoring by quarter: 27–24, 19–17, 21–14, 25–19
	Pts: Hayes-Davis, Lessort 19; Rebs: Lessort 8 Asts: Francisco 7 PIR: Lessort 30	Boxscore	Pts: Key 13; Rebs: Key 7 Asts: Baldwin IV 5 PIR: Key 15	Arena: Telekom Center Athens; Attendance: 18,768; Referees: Ilija Belošević, Carlos Peruga, Artūras Šukys

13 October 2026 5	Fenerbahçe Tarfin (Turkish Basketball Federation)	99–80	(Lithuanian Basketball Federation) Žalgiris	Istanbul
19:45	Scoring by quarter: 27–14, 23–29, 28–13, 21–24
	Pts: Shields 17; Rebs: Melli, Şanlı 4 Asts: Baldwin IV 7 PIR: Shields 19	Boxscore	Pts: Edwards 20; Rebs: Valančiūnas 10; Asts: Lee 4 PIR: Edwards 18	Arena: Ülker Sports and Event Hall; Attendance: 7,214; Referees: Juan Carlos García González, Miloš Koljenšić, Anne Panther

15 October 2026 6	Fenerbahçe Tarfin (Turkish Basketball Federation)	74–65	(Basketball Federation of Serbia) Partizan Mozzart Bet	Istanbul
19:45	Scoring by quarter: 12–19, 13–9, 34–16, 15–21
	Pts: Shields 17; Rebs: Bingham 9 Asts: Horton-Tucker 5 PIR: Shields 25	Boxscore	Pts: Thompson 13; Rebs: six players 4 Asts: Jones 8 PIR: Hayes 10	Arena: Ülker Sports and Event Hall; Attendance: 8176; Referees: Mehdi Difallah, Alberto Baena, Arnau Padros

23 October 2026 7	Olympiacos (Hellenic Basketball Federation)	61–64	(Turkish Basketball Federation) Fenerbahçe Tarfin	Piraeus
20:15	Scoring by quarter: 20–8, 14–16, 15–21, 12–19
	Pts: Vezenkov 17; Rebs: Milutinov 13; Asts: Miller-McIntyre 6 PIR: Vezenkov 20	Boxscore	Pts: Shields 17; Rebs: Shields 7 Asts: Baldwin IV, Larkin 5 PIR: Shields 25	Arena: Peace and Friendship Stadium; Attendance: 7,214; Referees: Ilija Belošević, Emilio Pérez, Eduard Udyanskyy

27 October 2026 8	Valencia Basket (Spanish Basketball Federation)	86–78	(Turkish Basketball Federation) Fenerbahçe Tarfin	Valencia
20:30	Scoring by quarter: 19–9, 17–16, 24–21, 26–32
	Pts: Shorts 23; Rebs: Sako 10; Asts: Shorts 3 PIR: Shorts 25	Boxscore	Pts: Baldwin IV 19; Rebs: Shields 8 Asts: Melli 4 PIR: Baldwin IV 23	Arena: Roig Arena; Attendance: 13,177; Referees: Damir Javor, Sergio Silva, Guido Giovannetti

29 October 2026 9	Real Madrid (Spanish Basketball Federation)	95–76	(Turkish Basketball Federation) Fenerbahçe Tarfin	Madrid
20:45	Scoring by quarter: 22–24, 25–18, 23–13, 25–21
	Pts: Maledon 26; Rebs: Maledon, Okeke 7 Asts: Campazzo 10; PIR: Maledon 35	Boxscore	Pts: Clyburn 21; Rebs: Shields 9 Asts: Baldwin IV, Key 3 PIR: Clyburn 16	Arena: Movistar Arena; Attendance: 9,826; Referees: Borys Ryzhyk, Gytis Vilius, Stefan Ćalić

4 November 2026 10	Fenerbahçe Tarfin (Turkish Basketball Federation)	84–65	(Spanish Basketball Federation) Kosner Baskonia	Istanbul
18:45	Scoring by quarter: 33–18, 19–14, 11–9, 21–24
	Pts: Horton-Tucker 19; Rebs: Bingham 9 Asts: Forrest, Horton-Tucker 4 PIR: Horton-Tucker 22	Boxscore	Pts: Simmons, Stewart 12; Rebs: Faried 15; Asts: Simmons 5 PIR: Faried 22	Arena: Ülker Sports and Event Hall; Attendance: 7,542; Referees: Saša Pukl, Miloš Koljenšić, Joseph Bissang

11 November 2026 11	Paris Basketball (French Federation of Basketball)	111–109(OT)	(Turkish Basketball Federation) Fenerbahçe Tarfin	Paris
20:45	Scoring by quarter: 23–14, 27–29, 22–29, 20–20, Overtime: 19–17
	Pts: Ntilikina 22; Rebs: three players 5 Asts: Herrera 6 PIR: Ntilikina 21	Boxscore	Pts: Horton-Tucker 32; Rebs: Horton-Tucker 10; Asts: Baldwin, Shields 4 PIR: Horton-Tucker 33	Arena: Adidas Arena; Attendance: 11,774; Referees: Juan Carlos García, Eduard Udyanskyy, Franko Gracin

17 November 2026 12	Fenerbahçe Tarfin (Turkish Basketball Federation)	115–81	(French Federation of Basketball) LDLC ASVEL	Istanbul
18:45	Scoring by quarter: 32–12, 22–27, 35–22, 26–20
	Pts: Larkin 25; Rebs: Juzang 11; Asts: Forrest 7 PIR: Larkin 26	Boxscore	Pts: Dossou-Yovo 19; Rebs: Dossou-Yovo 7 Asts: Waters 6 PIR: Dossou-Yovo 23	Arena: Ülker Sports and Event Hall; Attendance: 8,316; Referees: Carlos Cortés, Alberto Baena, Saulius Račys

19 November 2026 13	Armani Olimpia Milan (Italian Basketball Federation)	78–70	(Turkish Basketball Federation) Fenerbahçe Tarfin	Milan
20:30	Scoring by quarter: 23–19, 14–19, 18–23, 23–9
	Pts: Wright 22; Rebs: Wright 11; Asts: Bolmaro 5 PIR: Wright 36	Boxscore	Pts: Horton-Tucker 17; Rebs: Powell 7 Asts: Baldwin IV 4 PIR: Horton-Tucker 16	Arena: Unipol Forum; Attendance: 7,203; Referees: Carlos Peruga, Emilio Perez, Steve Bittner

24 November 2026 14	Barcelona (Spanish Basketball Federation)	vs.	(Turkish Basketball Federation) Fenerbahçe Tarfin	Barcelona
21:00
		Boxscore		Arena: Palau Blaugrana

3 December 2026 15	Fenerbahçe Tarfin (Turkish Basketball Federation)	vs.	(Basketball Federation of Serbia) Crvena zvezda Meridianbet	Istanbul
18:45
		Boxscore		Arena: Ülker Sports and Event Hall

10 December 2026 16	Fenerbahçe Tarfin (Turkish Basketball Federation)	vs.	(Turkish Basketball Federation) Anadolu Efes	Istanbul
18:45
		Boxscore		Arena: Ülker Sports and Event Hall

15 December 2026 17	Fenerbahçe Tarfin (Turkish Basketball Federation)	vs.	(Israeli Basketball Association) Hapoel IBI Tel Aviv	Istanbul
18:45
		Boxscore		Arena: Ülker Sports and Event Hall

17 December 2026 18	Fenerbahçe Tarfin (Turkish Basketball Federation)	vs.	(Israeli Basketball Association) Maccabi Rapyd Tel Aviv	Istanbul
18:45
		Boxscore		Arena: Ülker Sports and Event Hall

22 December 2026 19	Beşiktaş (Turkish Basketball Federation)	vs.	(Turkish Basketball Federation) Fenerbahçe Tarfin	Istanbul
18:00
		Boxscore		Arena: Basketball Development Center

29 December 2026 20	Fenerbahçe Tarfin (Turkish Basketball Federation)	vs.	(Hellenic Basketball Federation) Panathinaikos AKTOR	Istanbul
18:45
		Boxscore		Arena: Ülker Sports and Event Hall

7 January 2027 21	Anadolu Efes (Turkish Basketball Federation)	vs.	(Turkish Basketball Federation) Fenerbahçe Tarfin	Istanbul
18:30
		Boxscore		Arena: Basketball Development Center

12 January 2027 22	Dubai Basketball (United Arab Emirates Basketball Association)	vs.	(Turkish Basketball Federation) Fenerbahçe Tarfin	Dubai
17:00
		Boxscore		Arena: Coca-Cola Arena

15 January 2027 23	Partizan Mozzart Bet (Basketball Federation of Serbia)	vs.	(Turkish Basketball Federation) Fenerbahçe Tarfin	Belgrade
20:45
		Boxscore		Arena: Belgrade Arena

21 January 2027 24	Fenerbahçe Tarfin (Turkish Basketball Federation)	vs.	(Turkish Basketball Federation) Beşiktaş	Istanbul
18:45
		Boxscore		Arena: Ülker Sports and Event Hall

29 January 2027 25	Fenerbahçe Tarfin (Turkish Basketball Federation)	vs.	(Spanish Basketball Federation) Real Madrid	Istanbul
18:45
		Boxscore		Arena: Ülker Sports and Event Hall

2 February 2027 26	Kosner Baskonia (Spanish Basketball Federation)	vs.	(Turkish Basketball Federation) Fenerbahçe Tarfin	Vitoria-Gasteiz
20:30
		Boxscore		Arena: Buesa Arena

5 February 2027 27	LDLC ASVEL (French Federation of Basketball)	vs.	(Turkish Basketball Federation) Fenerbahçe Tarfin	Villeurbanne, Lyon
20:00
		Boxscore		Arena: LDLC Arena

12 February 2027 28	Fenerbahçe Tarfin (Turkish Basketball Federation)	vs.	(Italian Basketball Federation) Armani Olimpia Milan	Istanbul
18:45
		Boxscore		Arena: Ülker Sports and Event Hall

5 March 2027 29	Crvena zvezda Meridianbet (Basketball Federation of Serbia)	vs.	(Turkish Basketball Federation) Fenerbahçe Tarfin	Belgrade
20:00
		Boxscore		Arena: Belgrade Arena

9 March 2027 30	Virtus Olidata Bologna (Italian Basketball Federation)	vs.	(Turkish Basketball Federation) Fenerbahçe Tarfin	Bologna
20:30
		Boxscore		Arena: Virtus Arena

12 March 2027 31	Fenerbahçe Tarfin (Turkish Basketball Federation)	vs.	(Spanish Basketball Federation) Valencia Basket	Istanbul
18:45
		Boxscore		Arena: Ülker Sports and Event Hall

18 March 2027 32	Fenerbahçe Tarfin (Turkish Basketball Federation)	vs.	(French Federation of Basketball) Paris Basketball	Istanbul
18:45
		Boxscore		Arena: Ülker Sports and Event Hall

23 March 2027 33	Hapoel IBI Tel Aviv (Israeli Basketball Association)	vs.	(Turkish Basketball Federation) Fenerbahçe Tarfin	Sofia (Note: During the 2026–27 EuroLeague season, both Hapoel IBI Tel Aviv and Maccabi Playtika Tel Aviv are playing their home games outside of Israel due to the ongoing Gaza war. Maccabi Rapyd Tel Aviv host their games at Aleksandar Nikolić Hall in Belgrade, Serbia, while Hapoel IBI Tel Aviv play at Arena 8888 in Sofia, Bulgaria, with selected games moved to Arena Botevgrad when Arena 8888 is unavailable, until further notice.)
19:00
		Boxscore		Arena: Arena Sofia

26 March 2027 34	Fenerbahçe Tarfin (Turkish Basketball Federation)	vs.	(Spanish Basketball Federation) Barcelona	Istanbul
18:45
		Boxscore		Arena: Ülker Sports and Event Hall

1 April 2027 35	Maccabi Rapyd Tel Aviv (Israeli Basketball Association)	vs.	(Turkish Basketball Federation) Fenerbahçe Tarfin	Belgrade
20:05
		Boxscore		Arena: Aleksandar Nikolić Hall

6 April 2027 36	Fenerbahçe Tarfin (Turkish Basketball Federation)	vs.	(Hellenic Basketball Federation) Olympiacos	Istanbul
19:45
		Boxscore		Arena: Ülker Sports and Event Hall

8 April 2027 37	Bayern Munich (German Basketball Federation)	vs.	(Turkish Basketball Federation) Fenerbahçe Tarfin	Munich
20:30
		Boxscore		Arena: SAP Garden

15 April 2027 38	Žalgiris (Lithuanian Basketball Federation)	vs.	(Turkish Basketball Federation) Fenerbahçe Tarfin	Kaunas
19:00
		Boxscore		Arena: Žalgiris Arena

== Statistics ==
Legend
GP	Games played	GS	Games started	MPG	Minutes per game
FG%	Field-goal percentage	3FG%	3-point field-goal percentage	FT%	Free-throw percentage
RPG	Rebounds per game	APG	Assists per game	SPG	Steals per game
BPG	Blocks per game	PPG	Points per game	PIR	PIR per game

Player	Left during season

=== Basketbol Süper Ligi ===
Player	GP	GS	MPG	2FG%	3FG%	FT%	RPG	APG	SPG	BPG	PPG	PIR
Chris Silva	5	1	15:36	.700	—	.778	3.6	0.4	0.2	0.6	4.2	7.0

Source: Basketbol Süper Ligi

=== EuroLeague ===
Player	GP	GS	MPG	2FG%	3FG%	FT%	RPG	APG	SPG	BPG	PPG	PIR
Chris Silva	4	0	5:48	.333	—	.500	1.2	0	0.2	0.2	1.8	-1.2

Source: EuroLeague
