= Turkish Basketball Presidential Cup MVP =

The Turkish Basketball Presidential Cup Final MVP is an award that is given to the most outstanding player in the Final of the Turkish Basketball Presidential Cup. The award is handed out since 2016.

== Winners ==
Note: Flags indicate national team eligibility at FIBA-sanctioned events. Players may hold other non-FIBA nationalities not displayed.

Season	Nat.	Player	Club	Pos.	Pnt.	Reb.	Ass.	Ref.
2016	(Turkey)	Bobby Dixon	Fenerbahçe	PG	19	3	0	
2017	(Italy)	Luigi Datome	Fenerbahçe	F	14	5	0	
2018	(Turkey)	Doğuş Balbay	Anadolu Efes	PG	13	5	3	
2019	(Croatia)	Krunoslav Simon	Anadolu Efes	SG	22	3	2	
2020	Not awarded ^{1}							
2021	Not awarded ^{1}							
2022	(Croatia)	Ante Žižić	Anadolu Efes	C	22	5	1	
2023	Not awarded ^{2}							
2024	(United States)	Elijah Bryant	Anadolu Efes	G/F	21	8	5	
2025	(United States)	Devon Hall	Fenerbahçe	G	23	4	3	
2026	(Denmark)	Shavon Shields	Fenerbahçe	SF	10	6	3	

^1 There were no Presidential Cup games in the 2019–20 and 2020–21 seasons, because the season was cancelled due to the coronavirus pandemic in Turkey.
^2 There were no Presidential Cup games in the 2023–23 season, due to the 2023 Turkey–Syria earthquake.

== Awards won by nationality ==
Country	Total
Turkey	2
Croatia	2
United States	2
Italy	1
Denmark	1

== Awards won by club ==
Club	Total
Anadolu Efes	4
Fenerbahçe	4
