= Talen Horton-Tucker =

American basketball player (born 2000)

- Horton-Tucker in 2026

No. 8 – Fenerbahçe
- Position: Guard / small forward
- League: BSL; EuroLeague

Personal information
- Born: November 25, 2000 (age 25) Chicago, Illinois, U.S.
- Listed height: 6 ft 4 in (1.93 m)
- Listed weight: 234 lb (106 kg)

Career information
- High school: Simeon (Chicago, Illinois)
- College: Iowa State (2018–2019)
- NBA draft: 2019: 2nd round, 46th overall pick
- Drafted by: Orlando Magic
- Playing career: 2019–present

Career history
- 2019–2022: Los Angeles Lakers
- 2019–2020: →South Bay Lakers
- 2022–2024: Utah Jazz
- 2024–2025: Chicago Bulls
- 2025–present: Fenerbahçe

Career highlights
- NBA champion (2020); All-EuroLeague Second Team (2026); Turkish Super League champion (2026); Turkish Cup winner (2026); 2× Turkish Super Cup winner (2025, 2026); Big 12 All-Freshman Team (2019)
- Stats at NBA.com
- Stats at Basketball Reference

Talen Jalee Horton-Tucker (/ˈteɪlən/; born November 25, 2000) is an American professional basketball player for Fenerbahçe of the Basketbol Süper Ligi (BSL) and the EuroLeague. Horton-Tucker played college basketball for the Iowa State Cyclones.

== Early life ==
Born in Chicago, Horton–Tucker was raised in Uptown, a neighborhood of Chicago. Horton–Tucker is the son of Shirley Horton and Marlin Tucker. For elementary school, Horton–Tucker attended St. Matthias Elementary School in Chicago, where he had his No. 5 jersey retired.

Horton–Tucker played at Simeon Career Academy where he helped the Wolverines to three straight City Championships. A four-star recruit in ESPN's ranking, he committed to Iowa State in October 2017, choosing the Cyclones over schools such as Illinois and Xavier.

College recruiting
Name	Hometown	School	Height	Weight	Commit date
Talen Horton-Tucker; SF	Chicago, IL	Simeon (IL)	6 ft 5 in (1.96 m)	220 lb (100 kg)	Oct 26, 2017
Talen Horton-Tucker; SF	Recruit ratings: Rivals: 247Sports: ESPN: (85)				
Overall recruit ranking: Rivals: 33 247Sports: 65 ESPN: 66
Note: In many cases, Scout, Rivals, 247Sports, On3, and ESPN may conflict in their listings of height and weight.; In these cases, the average was taken. ESPN grades are on a 100-point scale.; Sources: "Iowa State 2018 Basketball Commitments". Rivals.; "2018 Iowa State Cyclones Recruiting Class". ESPN.; "2018 Team Ranking". Rivals.

== College career ==
On November 20, 2018, Horton–Tucker scored a career-high 26 points and grabbed a career-high 14 rebounds in a win against Illinois. As a freshman, Horton–Tucker averaged 11.8 points, 4.9 rebounds, 2.3 assists and 1.3 steals in 27 minutes per game. Horton–Tucker declared for the 2019 NBA draft after his freshman season.

== Professional career ==
=== Los Angeles Lakers (2019–2022) ===
On June 20, 2019, Horton-Tucker was selected as the 46th overall pick in the 2019 NBA draft by the Orlando Magic. He was traded on draft night to the Los Angeles Lakers in exchange for a 2020 second round draft pick and cash considerations. On July 13, Horton-Tucker signed with the Los Angeles Lakers. He was assigned to the Lakers’ NBA G League affiliate, the South Bay Lakers, for the opening of the G League season. He made his NBA debut on December 8, against the Minnesota Timberwolves. He received a larger role during the NBA Bubble as the Lakers had clinched the best record in the Western Conference and even started in the regular season finale. On September 12, 2020, Horton-Tucker scored 9 points in 10 minutes off the bench in Game 5 of Western Conference semifinals, helping the Lakers secure a 119–96 victory against the Houston Rockets and advance into the next round. Horton-Tucker won an NBA championship when the Lakers defeated the Miami Heat in the 2020 NBA Finals in 6 games. He became the second-youngest player in NBA history to win a championship, at 19 years and 322 days.

After a strong preseason, Horton-Tucker became a regular rotational player in the 2020–21 regular season. On January 10, 2021, he scored a career-high 17 points off the bench in the team's 120–102 win over the Houston Rockets. On February 4, he scored 17 points off the bench in the team's 114–93 win over the Denver Nuggets. On March 15, he scored a new career-high 18 points and recorded a career-high 10 assists in the team's 128–97 win over the Golden State Warriors. On April 8, Horton-Tucker was suspended for one game for leaving the bench during an altercation between the Lakers and the Toronto Raptors. On May 11, he scored the go-ahead three-pointer in the team's 101–99 overtime win against the New York Knicks.

On October 11, 2021, it was announced that Horton-Tucker would undergo surgery to repair torn ligaments in his right thumb, ruling him out for at least four weeks. At the 2022 trade deadline, Horton-Tucker was nearly dealt to the Toronto Raptors in a three team trade involving the New York Knicks. On April 7, 2022, he scored a career-high 40 points in a 112–128 loss to the Golden State Warriors. In a disappointing 2021–22 season for the Lakers, Horton-Tucker averaged 10 points and 2.7 assists.

=== Utah Jazz (2022–2024) ===
On August 25, 2022, Horton-Tucker was traded, alongside Stanley Johnson, to the Utah Jazz in exchange for Patrick Beverley. Horton-Tucker made his debut for the Jazz on October 19, recording three points and two steals in a 123–102 win over the Denver Nuggets. On March 29, 2023, he scored a career-high 41 points in a 128–117 win over the San Antonio Spurs.

=== Chicago Bulls (2024–2025) ===
On September 5, 2024, Horton-Tucker signed with the Chicago Bulls. Horton-Tucker made 58 appearances for the Bulls during the 2024–25 NBA season, averaging 6.5 points, 1.7 rebounds, and 1.4 assists.

=== Fenerbahçe (2025–present) ===
On September 20, 2025, Horton-Tucker signed with Fenerbahçe of the Basketbol Süper Ligi (BSL). On September 27, he recorded 24 points (9-16 FG), seven assists, four rebounds, and one steal in 24 minutes against Tofaş in his Basketbol Süper Ligi debut. On October 1, Horton-Tucker recorded 20 points (6-10 FG), two assists, two rebounds, one steal, and one block in 20 minutes against Paris Basketball in his first EuroLeague match. On October 10, he recorded 19 points (5-11 FG), two assists, two rebounds, two steals, and one block in 29 minutes against Crvena zvezda. On October 30, he recorded 10 points (6-10 FG), one assist, six rebounds, one steal, and two blocks in 22 minutes against Fenerbahçe's EuroLeague archrival Real Madrid.

On December 12, in a rematch of the EuroLeague final in Abu Dhabi, Horton-Tucker was masterful for the team, scored season high 24 points (9-13 FG), with four assists in 20 minutes, of Round 15 of the EuroLeague, defeating Monaco Basket on the road with a score of 92-86.

On February 25, 2026, Horton-Tucker led the team to victory with season high 29 points (10-12 FG), and three assists, four rebounds, two steals and two blocks with 33 pir in 29 minutes, of Round 29 of the EuroLeague, defeating Partizan with a score of 81-78, they remains at the top of the EuroLeague with a 21-7 record.

On July 8, 2026, Horton-Tucker agreed to a contract extension with Fenerbahçe.

== Style of play ==
Horton-Tucker has been described as having "a combination of outlier length and burgeoning skill." He has a height of 6’4 and a wingspan of 7’1, one of the largest height-to-wingspan differentials in NBA history.

== Career statistics ==
Legend
GP	Games played	GS	Games started	MPG	Minutes per game
FG%	Field goal percentage	3P%	3-point field goal percentage	FT%	Free throw percentage
RPG	Rebounds per game	APG	Assists per game	SPG	Steals per game
BPG	Blocks per game	PPG	Points per game	**Bold**	Career high
†	Won an NBA championship

=== NBA ===
==== Regular season ====
Year	Team	GP	GS	MPG	FG%	3P%	FT%	RPG	APG	SPG	BPG	PPG
2019–20†	L.A. Lakers	6	1	13.5	**.467**	.308	.500	1.2	1.0	**1.3**	.2	5.7
2020–21	L.A. Lakers	**65**	4	20.1	.458	.282	.775	2.6	2.8	1.0	.3	9.0
2021–22	L.A. Lakers	60	19	**25.2**	.416	.269	.800	**3.2**	2.7	1.0	**.5**	10.0
2022–23	Utah	**65**	**20**	20.2	.419	.286	.750	**3.2**	**3.8**	.6	.4	**10.7**
2023–24	Utah	51	11	19.8	.396	.330	**.807**	2.4	3.5	.9	.4	10.1
2024–25	Chicago	58	0	12.5	.457	**.336**	.735	1.7	1.4	.4	.2	6.5
Career		305	55	19.5	.427	.299	.771	2.6	2.8	.8	.4	9.2

==== Playoffs ====
Year	Team	GP	GS	MPG	FG%	3P%	FT%	RPG	APG	SPG	BPG	PPG
2020†	L.A. Lakers	2	0	8.5	**.500**	**.400**	—	2.5	.0	**1.0**	.0	**7.0**
2021	L.A. Lakers	**4**	0	**12.0**	.458	.200	**.600**	**3.5**	**.5**	.3	.0	6.5
Career		6	0	10.8	.472	.300	.600	3.2	.3	.5	.0	6.7

=== EuroLeague ===
Year	Team	GP	GS	MPG	FG%	3P%	FT%	RPG	APG	SPG	BPG	PPG	PIR
2025–26	Fenerbahçe	**41**	**33**	**23.8**	**.476**	**.265**	.757	3.8	2.2	**.7**	**.5**	**15.7**	**14.5**
2026–27	Fenerbahçe	11	8	20.7	.468	.189	**.897**	**4.2**	**2.3**	.5	.4	13.3	14.1
Career		52	41	23.2	.475	.250	.782	3.8	2.2	.7	.5	15.2	14.4

=== College ===
Year	Team	GP	GS	MPG	FG%	3P%	FT%	RPG	APG	SPG	BPG	PPG
2018–19	Iowa State	35	34	27.2	.406	.308	.625	4.9	2.3	1.3	.7	11.8
