= Onuralp Bitim =

Turkish basketball player (born 1999)

- Bitim with Fenerbahçe in 2025

No. 17 – Fenerbahçe
- Position: Shooting guard / small forward
- League: Basketbol Süper Ligi; EuroLeague

Personal information
- Born: 31 March 1999 (age 27) Kadıköy, Istanbul, Turkey
- Listed height: 1.96 m (6 ft 5 in)
- Listed weight: 98 kg (216 lb)

Career information
- High school: Huntington Prep (Huntington, West Virginia)
- NBA draft: 2021: undrafted
- Playing career: 2017–present

Career history
- 2017–2019: Anadolu Efes
- 2017–2018: →İTÜ BK
- 2019–2021: Karşıyaka
- 2021–2023: Bursaspor
- 2023–2024: Chicago Bulls
- 2023–2024: →Windy City Bulls
- 2024–present: Fenerbahçe
- 2024–2025: →Bayern Munich

Career highlights
- All-EuroCup Second Team (2023); Bundesliga champion (2025); 2× Turkish League champion (2019, 2026); 2× Turkish Cup winner (2018, 2026); 3× Turkish Super Cup champion (2018, 2025, 2026); 2× BSL Slam Dunk Contest champion (2018, 2020)
- Stats at NBA.com
- Stats at Basketball Reference
Medals
Men's basketball
Representing Turkey
EuroBasket
Silver medal – second place	2025 Cyprus–Finland–Poland–Latvia

Onuralp Bitim (born 31 March 1999 in Istanbul) is a Turkish professional basketball player for Fenerbahçe of the Turkish Basketbol Süper Ligi (BSL) and the EuroLeague. He plays as a small forward. He played one season in the National Basketball Association (NBA) with the Chicago Bulls. He is known for his athleticism and perimeter shot-creation.

He won the Turkish slam dunk contest twice, during 2018 and 2020 Basketbol Süper Ligi All-Star Weekend.

== Professional career ==
=== Anadolu Efes (2017–2019) ===
He started his career with Anadolu Efes and signed a dual license contract also with İTÜ BK for the 2017–2018 season. Thus, he played for both teams during the season. On 8 October 2017, he made his Basketball Super League debut against Karşıyaka and on 25 October 2017, he made his EuroLeague debut against Fenerbahçe.

=== Karşıyaka (2019–2021) ===
On 28 July 2019, Bitim signed a two-year contract with Pınar Karşıyaka.

On May 11, 2020, while Karşıyaka was in second place in the Turkish League with 20 wins, the league was postponed due to the COVID-19 pandemic and it was announced that the league would not continue and there would be no champion in the league.

=== Bursaspor (2021–2023) ===
On 7 June 2021, Bitim signed a two-year contract with Frutti Extra Bursaspor. After having a successful season with Bursaspor and reaching the EuroCup final, on 9 May 2022, Bitim extended his contract with the club for two more seasons.

=== Chicago Bulls / Windy City Bulls (2023–2024) ===
On 25 July 2023, Bitim signed a two-way contract with the Chicago Bulls and on 24 February 2024, he signed a standard contract. Bitim appeared in 23 games for Chicago in his rookie campaign, averaging 3.5 points, 1.4 rebounds, and 0.6 assists. On 16 April 2024, it was announced that Bitim had suffered a detached retina in his right eye, and would undergo season–ending surgery.

On 17 October 2024, Bitim was waived by the Bulls.

=== Fenerbahçe (2024–present) ===

On 8 November 2024, Bitim signed a contract with Istanbul powerhouse Fenerbahçe Beko until the end of the 2027–2028 season.

On 24 September 2025, he made his debut with the team in the 2025 Turkish Presidential Cup Final against Beşiktaş Gain, Bitim helped to Fenerbahçe to win the cup (85-83) with 8 points, 2 rebounds and 2 assists.

On 1 October 2025, he made his EuroLeague debut with the team against Paris Basketball in a 96-77 victory.

==== Loan to Bayern Munich (2024–2025) ====
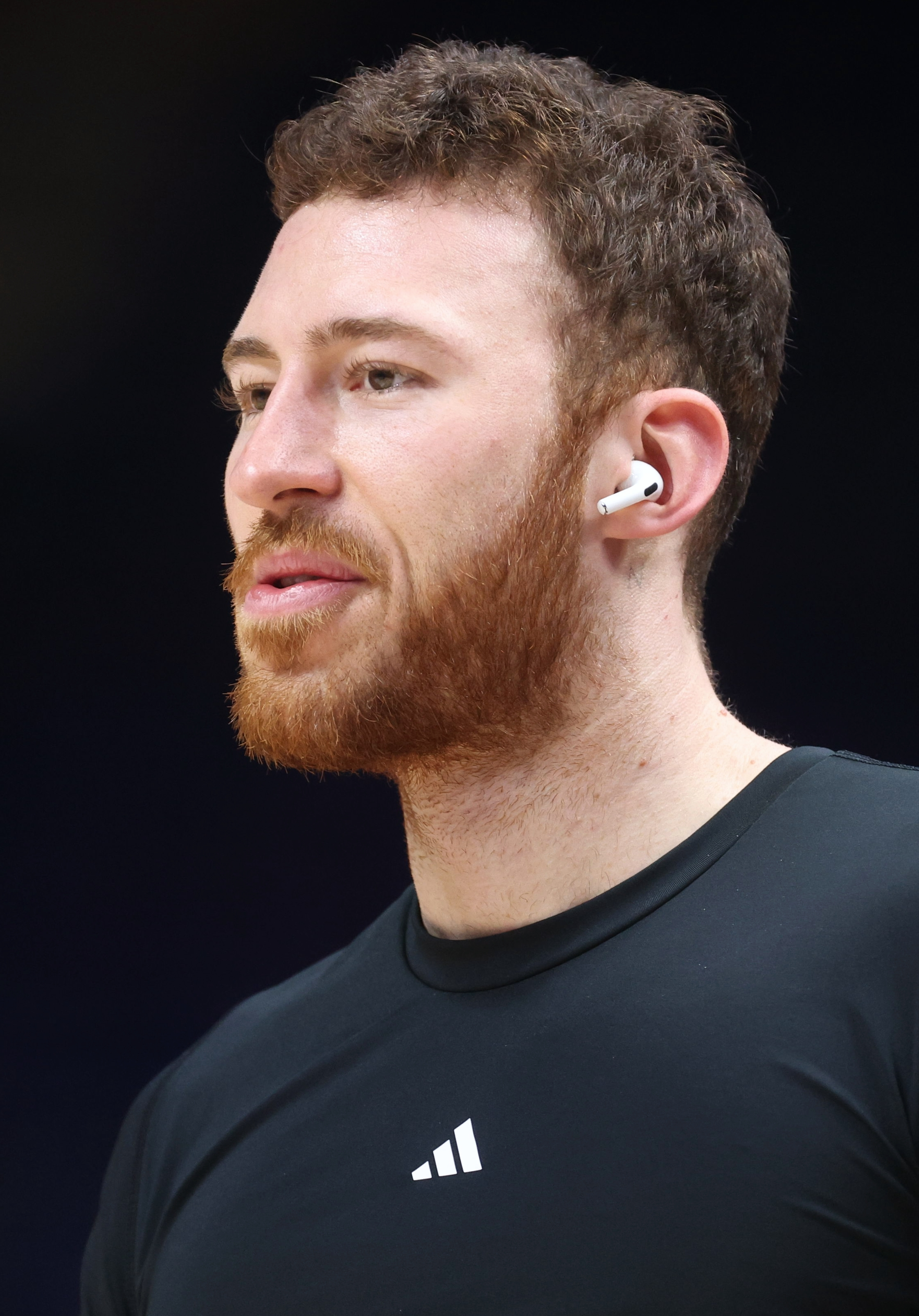

He was loaned by Fenerbahçe Beko to Bayern Munich until the end of 2024–2025 season.

== International ==
Bitim represented the Turkish national team at the 2023 FIBA World Cup qualification.

== Personal life ==
He is a longtime fan of Fenerbahçe since his childhood, because of his family; his father Mustafa Kemal Bitim played for Fenerbahçe Men's Basketball Team in 2001–2002 season and his mother Hilal Ertunalı played 8 seasons (between 1990–1998) for Fenerbahçe Women's Basketball Team.

On 8 November 2024, Bitim said in the 40+ program he attended on Fenerbahçe TV that he has been a Fenerbahçe fan since his childhood and that he owns many Fenerbahçe jerseys, and his favorite jersey is the 100th anniversary Roberto Carlos jersey.

== Career statistics ==
Legend
GP	Games played	GS	Games started	MPG	Minutes per game
FG%	Field goal percentage	3P%	3-point field goal percentage	FT%	Free throw percentage
RPG	Rebounds per game	APG	Assists per game	SPG	Steals per game
BPG	Blocks per game	PPG	Points per game	**Bold**	Career high

=== NBA ===
Year	Team	GP	GS	MPG	FG%	3P%	FT%	RPG	APG	SPG	BPG	PPG
2023–24	(United States) Chicago Bulls	23	1	11.7	.381	.273	.800	1.4	.6	.1	.1	3.5
**Career**		23	1	11.7	.381	.273	.800	1.4	.6	.1	.1	3.5

=== NBA G League ===
Year	Team	GP	GS	MPG	FG%	3P%	FT%	RPG	APG	SPG	BPG	PPG
2023–24	(United States) Windy City Bulls	22	?	30.0	.414	.363	.909	3.6	3.4	.7	.5	14.2
**Career**		22	?	30.0	.414	.363	.909	3.6	3.4	.7	.5	14.2

=== EuroLeague ===
As of match played 22 May 2026

Year	Team	GP	GS	MPG	FG%	3P%	FT%	RPG	APG	SPG	BPG	PPG	PIR
2017–18	(Turkey) Anadolu Efes	4	0	**8.4**	.333	**1.0**	1.0	1.0	**.5**	.0	.0	**2.5**	**2.5**
2024–25	(Germany) Bayern Munich	**12**	**1**	8.3	**.500**	.364	**1.0**	**.9**	.1	.1	**.2**	2.1	.9
2025–26	(Turkey) Fenerbahçe	29	0	10.3	.680	.364	.538	1.3	.3	.4	.0	2.7	2.4
2026–27	(Turkey) Fenerbahçe	0	0	0	.000	.000	.0	.0	.0	.0	.0	0.0	0.0
**Career**		45	1	9.5	.680	.391	.625	1.2	.2	.3	.1	2.5	2.0

Current season information is written in italics.

=== Basketball Champions League ===
Year	Team	GP	GS	MPG	FG%	3P%	FT%	RPG	APG	SPG	BPG	PPG	PIR
2020–21	(Turkey) Karşıyaka	12	0	9:05	.429	.493	.786	1.0	.7	.3	.2	2.8	1.7
**Career**		12	0	9:05	.429	.493	.786	1.0	.7	.3	.2	2.8	1.7

=== EuroCup ===
Year	Team	GP	GS	MPG	FG%	3P%	FT%	RPG	APG	SPG	BPG	PPG	PIR
2021–22	(Turkey) Bursaspor	**19**	**17**	29:54	**.535**	**.321**	.711	**4.3**	2.6	**.9**	.2	12.9	12.2
2022–23	(Turkey) Bursaspor	18	**17**	**32:06**	.493	**.321**	**.761**	3.8	**3.2**	.8	**.3**	**18.1**	**16.3**
**Career**		37	34	30:58	.513	.321	.743	4.1	2.9	.9	.3	15.4	14.2

=== Domestic leagues ===
As of match played 20 June 2026

Year	Team	League	GP	MPG	FG%	3P%	FT%	RPG	APG	SPG	BPG	PPG
2017–18	(Turkey) Anadolu Efes	TBSL	17	6:10	.429	.375	.600	.6	.5	.3	.0	1.8
2017–18	(Turkey) Sigortam.net İTÜ BB	TBL	9	17:55	.421	.222	.571	2.0	1.1	.2	.0	3.0
2018–19 †	(Turkey) Anadolu Efes	TBSL	14	12:21	.571	.256	.419	2.1	1.1	.6	**.3**	5.7
2019–20	(Turkey) Karşıyaka Basket	TBSL	20	12:58	.583	.389	.764	1.9	1.1	.4	.1	5.0
2020–21	(Turkey) Karşıyaka Basket	TBSL	23	15:17	**.656**	.333	.733	2.1	.8	.4	.1	5.7
2021–22	(Turkey) Frutti Extra Bursaspor	TBSL	27	27:41	.643	.371	**.847**	4.3	2.0	.7	.1	14.9
2022–23	(Turkey) Frutti Extra Bursaspor	TBSL	**30**	**30:58**	.545	**.409**	.687	**4.8**	**3.6**	**1.2**	.1	**16.8**
2024–25 †	(Germany) Bayern Munich	BBL	18	10.0	.526	.400	.429	1.2	.3	.2	.1	3.8
2025–26 †	(Turkey) Fenerbahçe	TBSL	33	15.4	.510	.368	.710	1.9	.3	.6	.0	5.4

Current season information is written in italics.
