= 2025 Turkish Basketball Presidential Cup =

Fenerbahçe Beko	Beşiktaş Gain
85	83
- Date: 24 September 2025
- Venue: Sinan Erdem Dome, Istanbul
- MVP: (United States) Devon Hall
- Attendance: 11,450

The 2025 Turkish Basketball Presidential Cup (Turkish: 2025 Erkekler Basketbol Cumhurbaşkanlığı Kupası) was the 38th edition of the Turkish Basketball Presidential Cup. The game was played on 24 September 2025 at Sinan Erdem Dome between Fenerbahçe Beko, champions of the 2024–25 Basketbol Süper Ligi, also winners of the 2025 Turkish Basketball Cup and Beşiktaş Gain, runners-up of the 2024–25 Basketbol Süper Ligi.

Fenerbahçe won 7 championship in their 18 final appearance, while Beşiktaş played a total of 2 President's Cup finals and won only 1 of them.

Fenerbahçe won the game 85-83 for their 8th title. They also won their 4th major trophy in 2025 (after winning Turkish Super League, Turkish Cup and EuroLeague), to become the first Turkish team to win 4 major trophies in one calendar year.

== Venue ==
Istanbul	2025 Turkish Basketball Presidential Cup (Istanbul)
Sinan Erdem Dome	2025 Turkish Basketball Presidential Cup (Istanbul)
Capacity: 16,000	2025 Turkish Basketball Presidential Cup (Istanbul)

== Match details ==
=== Summary ===
Fenerbahçe Beko defeated Beşiktaş Gain 85–83 to claim the 2025 Turkish Basketball Presidential Cup. Fenerbahçe built an early double-digit advantage, leading 25–13 after the first quarter and extending the gap to as much as 21 points in the second quarter. Beşiktaş reduced the margin to single digits before halftime, but trailed 43–34 at the break.

The third quarter saw Fenerbahçe re-establish control, with Devon Hall and Artūrs Žagars spearheading a 7–0 run to give their team a 50–34 lead. Entering the final quarter, Fenerbahçe held a 67–50 advantage. Beşiktaş responded in the fourth quarter through Devon Dotson and Jonah Mathews, narrowing the deficit to 77–71 in the closing minutes. A brief pause occurred when referees temporarily left the court, but play resumed after approximately 15 minutes. Despite Beşiktaş' late rally, Fenerbahçe maintained composure and secured the two-point victory.

Devon Hall led Fenerbahçe with 23 points, 4 rebounds, and 3 assists, earning the Most Valuable Player award. Mikael Jantunen added 19 points and 7 rebounds. For Beşiktaş, Devon Dotson scored a game-high 25 points alongside 4 assists, 3 rebounds, and 3 steals. The victory marked Fenerbahçe's eighth Presidential Cup title in club history.

=== Details ===
24 September 2025	Fenerbahçe Beko	85–83	Beşiktaş Gain	Istanbul
20:30 TRT (UTC+3)	Scoring by quarter: 25–13, 18–21, 24–16, 18–33
	Pts: Hall 23; Rebs: Jantunen 7 Asts: Baldwin 5 PIR: Jantunen 21	Boxscore	Pts: Dotson 25; Rebs: Žižić 8 Asts: Žižić, Dotson 4 PIR: Dotson 29	Arena: Sinan Erdem Dome; Attendance: 11,450; Referees: Emin Moğulkoç, Mehmet Serdar Ünal, Nazlı Çisil Güngör

Starters:			Pts	Reb	Ast
PG	32	(Latvia) Artūrs Žagars	5	2	4
SG	20	(United States) Devon Hall	23	4	3
SF	17	(Turkey) Onuralp Bitim	8	2	2
PF	18	(Finland) Mikael Jantunen	19	7	0
C	92	(Canada) Khem Birch	2	5	1
Reserves:					
F/C	00	(United States) Armando Bacot	4	4	0
PF	1	(Turkey) Metecan Birsen	DNP		
G	2	(United States) Wade Baldwin IV	20	1	5
F/C	4	(Italy) Nicolò Melli	4	4	1
SG	5	(Turkey) Mert Emre Ekşioğlu	0	0	0
SG	10	(Turkey) Melih Mahmutoğlu	0	2	2
SG	13	(Turkey) Tarik Biberović	0	1	0
Head coach:
(Lithuanian Basketball Federation) Šarūnas Jasikevičius

Fenerbahçe	Beşiktaş

Fenerbahçe	Statistics	Beşiktaş
17/35 (48,6%)	2-pt field goals	22/41 (53.6%)
12/27 (44,4%)	3-pt field goals	8/19 (42,1%)
15/19 (79%)	Free throws	15/25 (60%)
15	Offensive rebounds	12
23	Defensive rebounds	16
38	Total rebounds	28
18	Assists	11
15	Turnovers	10
3	Steals	7
2	Blocks	4
23	Fouls	21

2025 Turkish Presidential Cup champions
Fenerbahçe Beko
(8th title)

Starters:			Pts	Reb	Ast
PG	0	(United States) Jonah Mathews	11	1	0
SG	6	(Turkey) Berk Uğurlu	6	1	1
SF	21	(United States) Anthony Brown	0	2	0
PF	33	(United States) Vitto Brown	16	5	0
C	41	(Croatia) Ante Žižić	3	8	4
Reserves:					
PG	1	(United States) Devon Dotson	25	3	4
SG	7	(Turkey) Yiğit Arslan	5	0	0
PF	9	(Canada) Conor Morgan	9	4	0
SG	11	(United States) Brynton Lemar	8	1	2
SF	12	(Turkey) Canberk Kuş	DNP		
PF	15	(Turkey) Yiğit Çoban	DNP		
PG	19	(Turkey) Emir Adıgüzel	DNP		
Head coach:
(Basketball Federation of Serbia) Dušan Alimpijević
