= 2026 Turkish Basketball Presidential Cup =

- Fenerbahçe players and staff celebrating their Presidential Cup victory
Fenerbahçe Tarfin	Beşiktaş
72	59
- Date: 22 September 2026
- Venue: Sinan Erdem Dome, Istanbul
- MVP: (Denmark) Shavon Shields

The 2026 Turkish Basketball Presidential Cup (Turkish: 2026 Erkekler Basketbol Cumhurbaşkanlığı Kupası) was the 39th edition of the Turkish Basketball Presidential Cup. The game was played on 22 September 2026 at Sinan Erdem Dome between Fenerbahçe Tarfin, champions of the 2025–26 Basketbol Süper Ligi, also winners of the 2026 Turkish Basketball Cup and Beşiktaş, runners-up of the 2025–26 Basketbol Süper Ligi and 2025–26 Basketbol Süper Ligi.

This was the second consecutive Presidential Cup between Fenerbahçe and Beşiktaş, and the sixth consecutive domestic final matchup between the two teams across the Presidential Cup, Turkish Basketball Cup and Basketbol Süper Ligi. Fenerbahçe won all six of these finals. The victory was Fenerbahçe's 9th Presidential Cup title in 20 final appearances, while Beşiktaş had won 1 of their 4 final appearances.

== Venue ==
Istanbul	2026 Turkish Basketball Presidential Cup (Istanbul)
Sinan Erdem Dome	2026 Turkish Basketball Presidential Cup (Istanbul)
Capacity: 16,000	2026 Turkish Basketball Presidential Cup (Istanbul)

== Match details ==
Fenerbahçe Tarfin defeated Beşiktaş 72–59 to claim the 2026 Turkish Basketball Presidential Cup. Fenerbahçe took control in the opening quarter, with Nicolò Melli's outside shooting helping them build a 14–8 lead before extending the advantage to 21–10 by the end of the quarter. Fenerbahçe continued to dominate in the second quarter, with Melih Mahmutoğlu and Shavon Shields contributing early points. Beşiktaş struggled offensively as Fenerbahçe extended the lead to 15 points at 34–19. Further contributions from Talen Horton-Tucker, Wade Baldwin IV, Braxton Key and Trent Forrest helped Fenerbahçe take a 46–27 lead into halftime.

Beşiktaş opened the third quarter with a 5–0 run to cut the deficit to 46–32. Fenerbahçe responded through Braxton Key and Nicolò Melli, restoring a 19-point advantage at 51–32. Beşiktaş then recovered through Berk Uğurlu, Jaylen Nowell and Eugene Omoruyi, reducing the deficit to 58–46 heading into the final quarter. The fourth quarter began with baskets from both sides, with Will Clyburn scoring for Fenerbahçe before Metecan Birsen responded for Beşiktaş to reduce the deficit to 60–52. Fenerbahçe maintained their lead at 66–54 with three minutes remaining and held on to win 72–59, securing the 39th Turkish Basketball Presidential Cup.

Shavon Shields led Fenerbahçe with 10 points, 6 rebounds and 3 assists and was named the Most Valuable Player. Trent Forrest added 7 points, 7 rebounds and 2 assists. For Beşiktaş, Ante Žižić recorded 5 points, 8 rebounds, and 1 assist.

The victory marked Fenerbahçe's sixth consecutive victory over Beşiktaş in a domestic final, with the six finals comprising Basketbol Süper Ligi, Turkish Basketball Cup, and Presidential Cup competitions. Fenerbahçe had won all six of the final matchups.

=== Details ===
22 September 2026	Fenerbahçe Tarfin	72–59	Beşiktaş	Istanbul
20:00 TRT (UTC+3)	Scoring by quarter: 21–10, 25–17, 12–19, 14–13
	Pts: Baldwin 13; Rebs: Forrest, Key 7 Asts: Baldwin 6 PIR: Shields 14	Boxscore	Pts: Nowell 13; Rebs: Žižić 8 Asts: Wilbekin 4 PIR: Žižić 12	Arena: Sinan Erdem Dome; Referees: Özlem Yalman, Alper Altuğ Köselerli, Kaan Büyükçil

Starters:			Pts	Reb	Ast
PG	11	(United States) Trent Forrest	7	7	2
SG	8	(United States) Talen Horton-Tucker	3	3	0
SF	31	(Denmark) Shavon Shields	10	6	3
PF	12	(United States) Braxton Key	11	7	3
C	5	(Turkey) Sertaç Şanlı	5	4	1
Reserves:					
G	2	(United States) Wade Baldwin IV	13	2	6
F/C	4	(Italy) Nicolò Melli	7	5	1
SG	10	(Turkey) Melih Mahmutoğlu	5	1	0
F	14	(Turkey) Kadir Yiğit Yancı	0	0	0
SF	17	(Turkey) Onuralp Bitim	3	3	1
F	21	(United States) Will Clyburn	8	4	0
SG	77	(Turkey) Demircan Demir	0	0	0
Head coach:
(Lithuanian Basketball Federation) Šarūnas Jasikevičius

Fenerbahçe	Beşiktaş

Fenerbahçe	Statistics	Beşiktaş
16/32 (50%)	2-pt field goals	13/36 (36.1%)
5/23 (21.7%)	3-pt field goals	5/28 (17.9%)
25/38 (65.8%)	Free throws	18/28 (64.3%)
13	Offensive rebounds	15
33	Defensive rebounds	29
46	Total rebounds	44
17	Assists	11
8	Turnovers	8
5	Steals	4
3	Blocks	2
22	Fouls	27

2026 Turkish Presidential Cup champions
Fenerbahçe Tarfin
(9th title)

Starters:			Pts	Reb	Ast
PG	1	(United States) Devon Dotson	9	3	3
SG	12	(Turkey) Scottie Wilbekin	8	2	4
SF	2	(United States) DaQuan Jeffries	4	0	0
PF	20	(Nigeria) Eugene Omoruyi	7	4	1
C	41	(Croatia) Ante Žižić	5	8	1
Reserves:					
G	6	(Turkey) Berk Uğurlu	4	2	0
SG	10	(Turkey) Yağız Aksu	DNP		
PF	11	(Turkey) Metecan Birsen	6	2	0
SF	21	(United States) Anthony Brown	3	3	0
G	24	(United States) Jaylen Nowell	13	3	2
G/F	30	(Turkey) Furkan Korkmaz	0	7	0
C	32	(South Sudan) Wenyen Gabriel	0	6	0
Head coach:
(Basketball Federation of Serbia) Dušan Alimpijević
