= Wade Baldwin IV =

American basketball player (born 1996)

- Baldwin IV with Fenerbahçe in 2026

No. 2 – Fenerbahçe
- Position: Point guard / shooting guard
- League: BSL; EuroLeague

Personal information
- Born: March 29, 1996 (age 30) Belle Mead, New Jersey, U.S.
- Listed height: 6 ft 4 in (1.93 m)
- Listed weight: 200 lb (91 kg)

Career information
- High school: St. Joseph (Metuchen, New Jersey)
- College: Vanderbilt (2014–2016)
- NBA draft: 2016: 1st round, 17th overall pick
- Drafted by: Memphis Grizzlies
- Playing career: 2016–present

Career history
- 2016–2017: Memphis Grizzlies
- 2016–2017: →Iowa Energy
- 2017–2019: Portland Trail Blazers
- 2017–2019: →Texas Legends
- 2019: Raptors 905
- 2019–2020: Olympiacos
- 2020–2021: Bayern Munich
- 2021–2022: Baskonia
- 2022–2024: Maccabi Tel Aviv
- 2024–present: Fenerbahçe

Career highlights
- EuroLeague champion (2025); 3× All-EuroLeague Second Team (2023, 2024, 2026); 2× Turkish Super League champion (2025, 2026); 2× Turkish Cup winner (2025, 2026); 2× Turkish Super Cup winner (2025, 2026); Turkish Super League Finals MVP (2026); 2× Israeli Premier League champion (2023, 2024); Israeli League Cup winner (2022); Israeli Premier League League Finals MVP (2023); All-Israeli Premier League Second Team (2023); German Cup winner (2021); Second-team All-SEC (2016)
- Stats at NBA.com
- Stats at Basketball Reference

Wade Manson Baldwin IV (born March 29, 1996) is an American professional basketball player for Fenerbahçe of the Turkish Basketbol Süper Ligi (BSL) and the EuroLeague.

== High school and college career ==
Born in the Belle Mead section of Montgomery Township, New Jersey, Baldwin attended Immaculata High School in Somerville, New Jersey and transferred to St. Joseph High School in Metuchen, New Jersey prior to his junior year.

As a freshman at Vanderbilt, Baldwin started 24 of 35 games and averaged 9.3 points, 4.1 rebounds, 1.4 steals (8th in the SEC), and 4.4 assists per game (5th), while shooting 43.9% from three-point range. He set a Vanderbilt freshman record with 155 assists.

During his sophomore year, he averaged 14.1 points, 4 rebounds, and 5.2 assists (3rd in the SEC) per game, while shooting 40.6% from three-point range and .799 from the line (9th). Baldwin led Vanderbilt to an appearance in the First Four in 2016 where they lost to Wichita State, 70–50.

On March 28, 2016, Baldwin declared for the NBA draft, forgoing his final two years of college eligibility.

== Professional career ==
=== Memphis Grizzlies (2016–2017) ===
On June 23, 2016, Baldwin was selected by the Memphis Grizzlies with the 17th overall pick in the 2016 NBA draft. On July 16, he signed his rookie scale contract with the Grizzlies. Baldwin made his debut for the Grizzlies in their season opener on October 26, recording seven points, five rebounds, six assists, three steals, and three blocks in 24 minutes off the bench in a 102–98 win over the Minnesota Timberwolves. On December 6, he recorded his first double-digit-scoring game with 11 points in the Grizzlies' 96–91 win over the Philadelphia 76ers. During his rookie season, Baldwin had multiple assignments with the Iowa Energy, the Grizzlies' D-League affiliate. On October 16, 2017, Baldwin was waived by the Grizzlies.

=== Portland Trail Blazers (2017–2019) ===
On October 19, 2017, Baldwin was signed on a two-way contract by the Portland Trail Blazers. Under the terms of the deal, for the 2017–18 season, he had a one-year deal splitting time between the Trail Blazers and a G-League affiliate that would be best suited for him, since Portland is currently one of four teams to not hold a G-League affiliate of their own this season. In this instance, he would be spending time with the Texas Legends. On March 12, 2018, Baldwin signed a standard NBA contract with the Blazers.

On February 4, 2019, Baldwin was traded to the Cleveland Cavaliers along with Nik Stauskas and two second-round picks for Rodney Hood.

On February 7, the Cleveland Cavaliers then traded both him and Stauskas to the Houston Rockets. Hours later, he was traded again, this time to the Indiana Pacers alongside Stauskas, a 2021 second-round draft pick and the rights to Maarty Leunen, in exchange for cash considerations. On February 8, 2019, Baldwin was waived by the Pacers.

=== Raptors 905 (2019) ===
On February 25, 2019, Baldwin was claimed off waivers by the Raptors 905.

=== Olympiacos (2019–2020) ===
On July 17, 2019, Baldwin signed a two-year contract with the Greek EuroLeague club Olympiacos.

=== Bayern Munich (2020–2021) ===
On July 27, 2020, Baldwin signed with Bayern Munich of the Basketball Bundesliga (BBL) and the EuroLeague.

=== Baskonia (2021–2022) ===
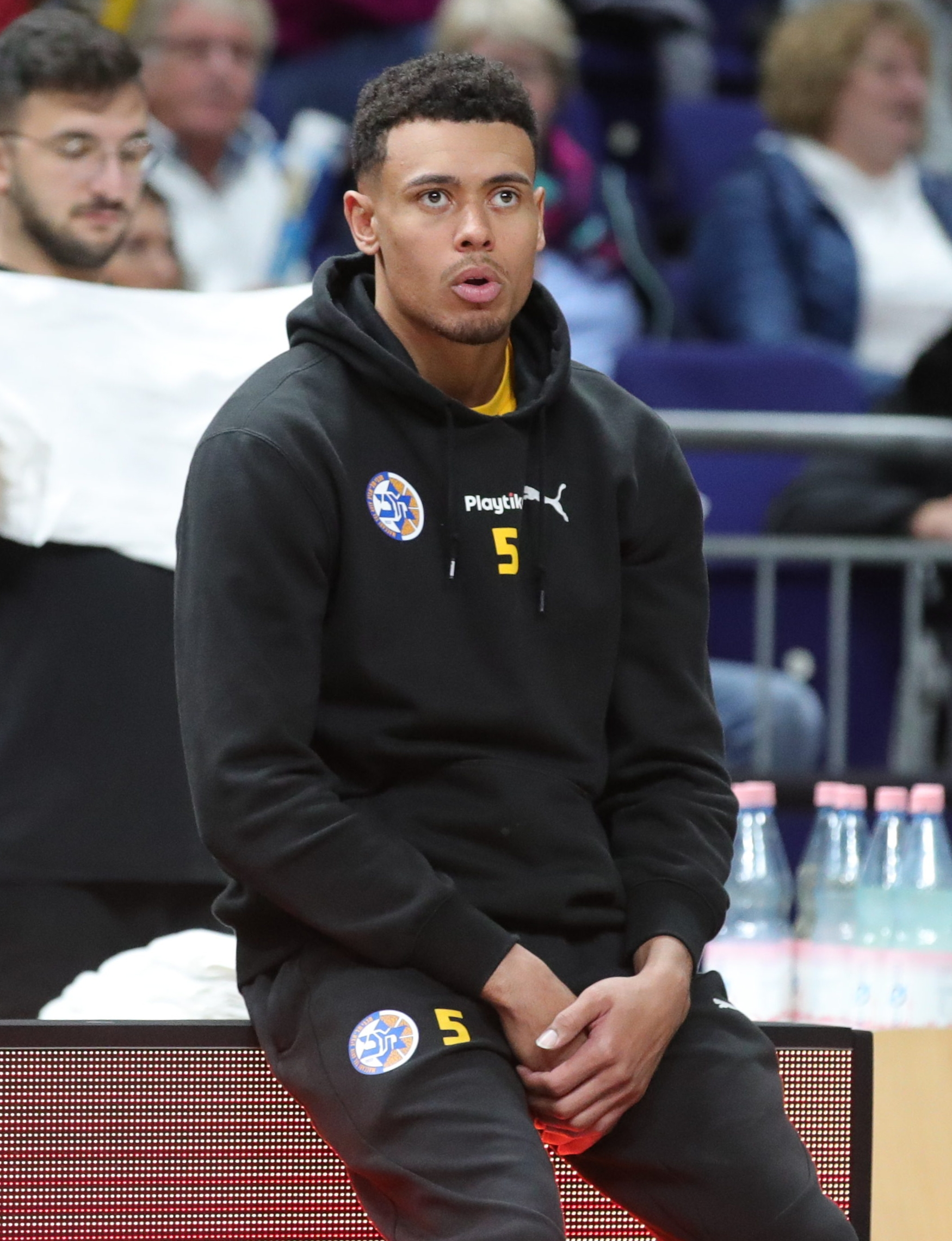
Baldwin IV in December 2022

On July 10, 2021, Baldwin signed with Saski Baskonia of the Liga ACB. He averaged 14.1 points, 3.6 rebounds, 4.4 assists, and 1.1 steals per game.

=== Maccabi Tel Aviv (2022–2024) ===
On June 30, 2022, Baldwin signed a two-year contract with Maccabi Tel Aviv of the Israeli Premier League and the EuroLeague. He was second in scoring in the 2022–23 EuroLeague regular season, with 16.7 points per game, only trailing Aleksandar Vezenkov. Baldwin was named the March 2023 MVP by the EuroLeague. The following month, in April, Baldwin agreed to an extension of his contract that commits him to Maccabi until 2025.

=== Fenerbahçe (2024–present) ===
On July 10, 2024, Baldwin signed with Fenerbahçe Beko of the Turkish Basketbol Süper Ligi.

On May 25, 2025, Baldwin IV helped Fenerbahçe to their second EuroLeague championship in Abu Dhabi. He helped the team defeat the defending champions Panathinaikos in the semi-final with 10 points, five rebounds, five assists, and two steal, and Monaco in the final with 13 points, two rebounds, three assists, and one steal. On October 1, Baldwin made double-double performance with 10 points, 10 assists, and two rebounds in 26 minutes in the 2025–26 EuroLeague opening match against Paris Basketball in a 96–77 victory. On January 2, 2026, Baldwin was named the Round 19 MVP of the EuroLeague for his performance in a 93-108 road win at his former club Baskonia, leading Fenerbahçe with 24 points, seven assists, and a 29 PIR rating. This performance marked Baldwin’s eighth MVP award with four different teams: FC Bayern Munich, Baskonia, Maccabi Tel Aviv, and now Fenerbahce.

On January 6, 2026, Baldwin made another double-double performance with 17 points, 11 assists (career–high tied), and six rebounds against Olympiacos in an 88–80 home victory. Over the first two Euroleague games in February, Baldwin recorded 16 assists with only one turnover as Fenerbahçe defeated Efes and Barcelona.

== Career statistics ==
Legend
GP	Games played	GS	Games started	MPG	Minutes per game
FG%	Field-goal percentage	3P%	3-point field-goal percentage	FT%	Free-throw percentage
RPG	Rebounds per game	APG	Assists per game	SPG	Steals per game
BPG	Blocks per game	PPG	Points per game	PIR	Performance index rating
**Bold**	Career high

=== Regular season ===
Year	Team	GP	GS	MPG	FG%	3P%	FT%	RPG	APG	SPG	BPG	PPG
2016–17	Memphis	**33**	**1**	**12.3**	.313	.136	**.838**	**1.4**	**1.8**	**.5**	**.2**	3.2
2017–18	Portland	7	0	11.4	**.667**	**.800**	.600	1.1	.7	.3	.1	**5.4**
2018–19	Portland	16	0	5.9	.303	.222	.727	.9	.8	.1	.1	1.9
Career		56	1	10.3	.355	.250	.776	1.2	1.4	.4	.2	3.1

=== Playoffs ===
Year	Team	GP	GS	MPG	FG%	3P%	FT%	RPG	APG	SPG	BPG	PPG
2017	Memphis	3	0	4.0	.000	—	**1.000**	**1.3**	.7	—	—	0.7
2018	Portland	4	0	**4.8**	**.250**	**1.000**	.500	.8	**.8**	**.3**	**.3**	**1.0**
Career		7	0	4.4	.200	1.000	.750	1.0	.7	.1	.1	0.9

=== EuroLeague ===
As of match played 25 November 2025

†	Denotes seasons in which Baldwin IV won the EuroLeague

Year	Team	GP	GS	MPG	FG%	3P%	FT%	RPG	APG	SPG	BPG	PPG	PIR
2019–20	Olympiacos	24	9	16.8	.422	.267	.633	1.8	1.8	.5	.0	5.5	4.3
2020–21	Bayern Munich	39	**38**	27.3	.437	.285	.761	3.0	4.0	**1.1**	.3	15.3	13.4
2021–22	Baskonia	30	25	28.0	.460	.340	.813	3.6	4.4	**1.1**	.2	14.1	15.5
2022–23	Maccabi Tel Aviv	34	33	**28.1**	.438	.327	.821	**3.8**	5.1	.9	.3	17.2	17.6
2023–24	Maccabi Tel Aviv	30	30	27.5	.456	**.391**	**.848**	2.5	4.9	1.0	.2	**17.4**	**19.1**
2024–25 †	Fenerbahçe	27	13	24.1	**.476**	.309	.797	2.7	3.7	.9	.3	11.1	11.0
2025–26	Fenerbahçe	**42**	7	25.5	.456	.293	.785	3.2	**5.5**	.7	**.4**	14.0	16.4
2026–27	Fenerbahçe	11	1	23.9	.505	.278	.742	2.9	4.5	1.1	.0	12.3	13.8
Career		237	156	25.7	.447	.319	.793	3.0	4.4	.9	.2	13.8	14.3

=== Domestic leagues ===
†	Denotes seasons in which Baldwin IV won the domestic league

Year	Team	League	GP	MPG	FG%	3P%	FT%	RPG	APG	SPG	BPG	PPG
2016–17	(United States) Iowa Energy	D-League	33	28.2	.435	.307	.748	4.2	5.3	1.3	.4	12.9
2017–18	(United States) Texas Legends	G League	17	33.8	.422	.236	.798	4.5	5.1	2.2	.4	18.2
2018–19	(United States) Texas Legends	G League	6	32.9	.455	.278	.784	5.0	4.0	2.5	.5	22.7
2018–19	(United States) Raptors 905	G League	8	31.6	.483	.395	.720	5.6	4.2	1.4	.2	21.6
2020–21	(Germany) Bayern Munich	BBL	33	23.0	.455	.366	.771	2.6	4.0	1.1	.2	12.4
2021–22	(Spain) Baskonia	ACB	39	25.9	.471	.385	.768	3.3	3.9	1.2	.4	12.8
2022–23 †	(Israel) Maccabi Tel Aviv	Ligat HaAl	21	23.2	.435	.426	.750	3.1	5.3	.9	.2	13.7
2023–24 †	(Israel) Maccabi Tel Aviv	Ligat HaAl	17	22.1	.380	.136	.866	2.0	5.1	.8	.3	11.7
2024–25 †	(Turkey) Fenerbahçe	TBSL	27	21.0	.500	.333	.721	2.6	3.8	.6	.1	11.2
2025–26 †	(Turkey) Fenerbahçe	TBSL	30	21.8	.486	.367	.789	3.0	4.8	.8	.2	12.6

=== College ===
Year	Team	GP	GS	MPG	FG%	3P%	FT%	RPG	APG	SPG	BPG	PPG
2014–15	Vanderbilt	**35**	24	28.8	**.436**	**.439**	**.802**	**4.1**	4.4	**1.4**	.1	9.3
2015–16	Vanderbilt	33	**30**	**30.4**	.427	.406	.799	4.0	**5.2**	1.2	**.3**	**14.1**
Career		68	54	29.6	.431	.422	.800	4.1	4.8	1.3	.2	11.6

== Personal life ==
Baldwin shares the same name as his father, grandfather and great-grandfather. He is named in honor of his grandfather who died when Baldwin's father was aged 10.

Baldwin's father worked as a senior special agent for the Drug Enforcement Administration and his mother worked for the Federal Bureau of Investigation.
