= 2019 Turkish Basketball Presidential Cup =

Anadolu Efes	Fenerbahçe Beko
79	74
- Date: 26 September 2019
- Venue: Karataş Şahinbey Sport Hall, Gaziantep
- MVP: (Croatia) Krunoslav Simon

The 2019 Turkish Basketball Presidential Cup (Turkish: 2019 Erkekler Basketbol Cumhurbaşkanlığı Kupası) was the 35th edition of the Turkish Basketball Presidential Cup. The game was played between Anadolu Efes, champions of the 2018–19 Basketbol Süper Ligi, and Fenerbahçe Beko, the winners of the 2019 Turkish Cup.

Anadolu Efes won their 12th championship in their 23rd final appearance, while Fenerbahçe played a total of 16 President's Cup finals and won only 7 of them.

== Venue ==
Gaziantep	2019 Turkish Basketball Presidential Cup (Turkey)
Karataş Şahinbey Sport Hall	2019 Turkish Basketball Presidential Cup (Turkey)
Capacity: 6,400	2019 Turkish Basketball Presidential Cup (Turkey)

== Match details ==
Krunoslav Simon, who had 22 points (he shot 6/6 behind 3 point line), 3 rebounds and 2 assists in the game, was named the Presidential Cup MVP.

26 September 2019	Anadolu Efes	79–74	Fenerbahçe Beko	Gaziantep
19:00 (TRT)	Scoring by quarter: 19–20, 20–17, 25–15, 15–22
TRT Spor	Pts: Simon 22; Rebs: Peters 8 Asts: Micić 9	Boxscore	Pts: Williams 16; Rebs: Düverioğlu 7 Asts: Sloukas 9	Arena: Karataş Şahinbey Sport Hall; Attendance: 5,800; Referees: Emin Moğulkoç, Mehmet Karabilecen, Kerem Baki

Starters:			Pts	Reb	Ast
PG	4	(Turkey) Doğuş Balbay	2	3	2
SG	1	(France) Rodrigue Beaubois	6	3	2
SG	44	(Croatia) Krunoslav Simon	22	3	2
PF	25	(United States) Alec Peters	12	8	4
C	42	(Armenia) Bryant Dunston	15	2	3
Reserves:					
PF	3	(Turkey) Yiğitcan Saybir	DNP		
SG	6	(Turkey) Mustafa Kurtuldum	DNP		
SF	8	(Turkey) Tolga Geçim	0	0	1
PG	10	(Turkey) Ömercan İlyasoğlu	DNP		
C	15	(Turkey) Sertaç Şanlı	6	1	0
PG	19	(Turkey) Buğrahan Tuncer	0	0	0
SG	22	(Serbia) Vasilije Micić	16	5	9
Head coach:
(Turkish Basketball Federation) Ergin Ataman

Anadolu Efes	Fenerbahçe

2019 Turkish Presidential Cup champions
Anadolu Efes
(12th title)

Starters:			Pts	Reb	Ast
PG	16	(Greece) Kostas Sloukas	8	3	9
SG	10	(Turkey) Melih Mahmutoğlu	11	1	1
SF	12	(Serbia) Nikola Kalinić	13	6	2
PF	21	(United States) Derrick Williams	16	4	3
C	44	(Turkey) Ahmet Düverioğlu	9	7	2
Reserves:					
SF	3	(Turkey) Ergi Tırpancı	DNP		
SG	8	(Turkey) Ekrem Sancaklı	DNP		
SF	18	(Turkey) Egehan Arna	DNP		
PG	19	(France) Nando de Colo	4	5	5
SF	32	(Turkey) Berkay Candan	0	1	0
PG	35	(Turkey) Ali Muhammed	5	2	0
C	91	(Serbia) Vladimir Štimac	8	4	0
Head coach:
(Basketball Federation of Serbia) Željko Obradović
