= Shavon Shields =

American-Danish basketball player

- Shields with Fenerbahçe in 2026

No. 31 – Fenerbahçe
- Position: Forward / shooting guard
- League: BSL; EuroLeague

Personal information
- Born: June 5, 1994 (age 32) Overland Park, Kansas, U.S.
- Listed height: 2.01 m (6 ft 7 in)
- Listed weight: 100 kg (220 lb)

Career information
- High school: Northwest (Olathe, Kansas)
- College: Nebraska (2012–2016)
- NBA draft: 2016: undrafted
- Playing career: 2016–present

Career history
- 2016–2017: Skyliners Frankfurt
- 2017–2018: Aquila Trento
- 2018–2020: Baskonia
- 2020–2026: Olimpia Milano
- 2026–present: Fenerbahçe

Career highlights
- 2× All-EuroLeague Second Team (2021, 2022); 4x Lega Serie A champion (2022–2024, 2026); 2× Italian Cup winner (2021, 2026); 3× Italian Super Cup winner (2020, 2024, 2025); Lega Serie A Finals MVP (2022); All-Lega Serie A Team (2021); Turkish Super Cup winner (2026); Turkish Super Cup MVP (2026); 2× First-team Academic All-American (2015, 2016); Second-team All-Big Ten (2016)

Shavon O'Day Shields (born June 5, 1994) is a Danish-American professional basketball player for Fenerbahçe of the Turkish Basketbol Süper Ligi (BSL) and the EuroLeague. He represents the Denmark national team. He played college basketball for the Nebraska Cornhuskers.

== High school career ==
As a junior, Shields was a second-team all-Class 6A honoree and a first-team All-Sunflower Conference selection, as he averaged 17 points and six rebounds a game. Shields transferred into Olathe Northwest for his sophomore year, earning Sunflower League Newcomer-of-the-Year accolades. He also starred playing AAU ball for the MoKan Elite and Coach Rodney Perry. An outstanding student with a 4.0 GPA, Shields was on the honor roll throughout high school and a National Honor Society member.

As a senior, Shields was a consensus first-team Class 6A selection in Kansas after averaging 21.2 points, 8.5 rebounds and 3.0 assists per game for Coach Michael Grove at Olathe Northwest High School. He helped the Ravens to a 20–2 record and an appearance in the sub-state finals. Shields helped Olathe Northwest to an unblemished record in league play, earning Sunflower Conference MVP honors. In addition, he earned second-team all-class honors from the Topeka Capital Journal and Wichita Eagle, a first-team all-metro selection by the Kansas City Star and was a finalist for the DiRenna Award, signifying the top player in the Kansas City area.

Shields came to Nebraska after being one of the top players in the Kansas City area throughout his prep career. Shields joined Willie Cauley-Stein as Olathe Northwest's first-ever Division I signees in November 2011. Shields totaled 1,068 points in his three-year career at the school and finished as the school's all-time leader in points, rebounds, free throws, field goals, steals and rebounds.

== Recruitment ==
Shavon selected Nebraska over Texas Tech, Oregon State, Weber State, Long Beach State and Wyoming.

College recruiting
Name	Hometown	School	Height	Weight	Commit date
Shavon Shields; SG/SF	Olathe, KS	Olathe Northwest High School	6 ft 4 in (1.93 m)	200 lb (91 kg)	Sep 5, 2011
Shavon Shields; SG/SF	Recruit ratings: Scout: Rivals: 247Sports: ESPN: (82)				
Overall recruit ranking:
Note: In many cases, Scout, Rivals, 247Sports, On3, and ESPN may conflict in their listings of height and weight.; In these cases, the average was taken. ESPN grades are on a 100-point scale.; Sources: "2012 Nebraska Signees". Rivals.; "2012 Nebraska Basketball Recruiting Commits". Scout.; "ESPN - Nebraska Cornhuskers Basketball Recruiting 2012". ESPN.; "Scout.com Team Recruiting Rankings". Scout.; "2012 Team Ranking". Rivals.

== College career ==
=== Freshman year ===
Shields was twice named Big Ten Conference Freshman of the week during the 2012–13 NCAA Division I men's basketball season.

=== Sophomore year ===
Shields was the November 11, 2013 and March 10, 2014, men's basketball player of the week during the 2013–14 Big Ten Conference season. On January 31, 2014, he was named an Academic All-District by CoSIDA, placing him among the 40 finalists for fifteen 2013–14 Academic All-American basketball selections.

=== Junior year ===
On February 26, 2016, Shields became the first Nebraska men's basketball player to be named a First Team Academic All-American by the College Sports Information Directors of America (CoSIDA).

=== Senior year ===
Shields finished his career at Nebraska tied for fifth on the school's all-time scoring list (1,630 points). He led the Huskers in scoring his senior season with 16.8 points per game. The conference coaches named him second-team All-Big Ten, and the conference media panel selected him to its third team.

=== Academic achievements ===
Shields also excelled as a student. During the 2015–16 year, Shields was selected as the Male Student-Athlete of the Year, narrowly being selected over friend and classmate Levi Gipson. Shields carried a 3.73 GPA in biological sciences and was a six-time member of Nebraska's scholar-athlete honor roll. Although participating in different sports, Shields and Gipson pushed each other in the classroom and both achieved First-team CoSIDA Academic All-American honors. Shields is the sixth Husker to be a CoSIDA Academic All-American in basketball, but the only one to be named to the first team.

== Professional career ==
=== Fraport Skyliners (2016–2017) ===
On August 24, 2016, Shields signed with the German team Fraport Skyliners.

=== Dolomiti Energia Trento (2017–2018) ===
Fraport Skyliners Frankfurt loaned Shavon Shields to Aquila Basket Trento during the tail end of 2016–17.

=== Kirolbet Baskonia (2018–2020) ===
On July 18, 2018, Shields signed a two-year deal with Kirolbet Baskonia of the Liga ACB and the EuroLeague. On June 30, 2020, Shields won the Liga ACB with Kirolbet Baskonia.

=== Olimpia Milano (2020–2026) ===
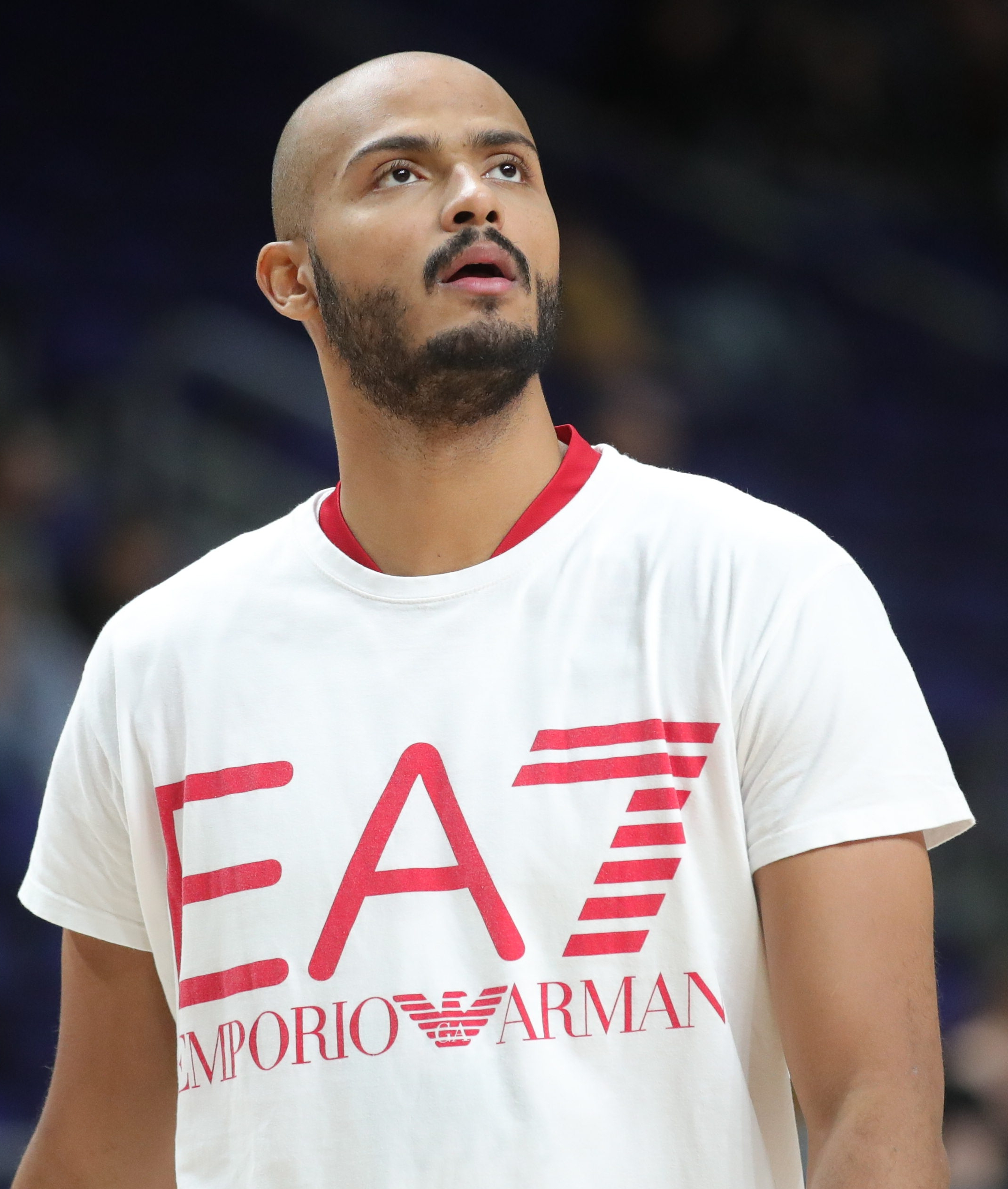
Shields with Olimpia Milano in 2023

On July 9, 2020, Shields signed with Olimpia Milano of the Lega Basket Serie A and the EuroLeague. He averaged 13.8 points and 4.0 rebounds per game, shooting 43.2 percent from three-point range. Shields was named to the All-EuroLeague second team. He extended his contract for two seasons on September 8, 2021. On December 6, he suffered a fracture of the right radius with capsuloligamentous involvement during the fourth quarter of a game against Real Madrid. He was most recently the LBA Most Valuable Player Finals (2022). On June 24, 2023, Shields renewed his contract with the Italian powerhouse through 2026.

=== Fenerbahçe (2026–present) ===
On July 9, 2026, Shields signed a two-year deal with Fenerbahçe of the Basketbol Süper Ligi (BSL) and the EuroLeague.

== Career statistics ==
Legend
GP	Games played	GS	Games started	MPG	Minutes per game
FG%	Field-goal percentage	3P%	3-point field-goal percentage	FT%	Free-throw percentage
RPG	Rebounds per game	APG	Assists per game	SPG	Steals per game
BPG	Blocks per game	PPG	Points per game	PIR	Performance index rating
**Bold**	Career high

=== EuroLeague ===
Year	Team	GP	GS	MPG	FG%	3P%	FT%	RPG	APG	SPG	BPG	PPG	PIR
2018–19	Baskonia	33	30	24.5	.502	.356	**.883**	2.8	1.1	.6	.1	9.8	9.2
2019–20	Baskonia	26	21	25.3	.448	.346	.857	3.4	1.0	.4	.2	9.5	8.5
2020–21	Olimpia Milano	**36**	17	26.8	**.511**	**.432**	.838	**4.0**	1.4	1.1	.2	13.8	15.0
2021–22	Olimpia Milano	24	23	29.8	.437	.347	.787	**4.0**	**2.8**	1.1	**.4**	13.0	14.2
2022–23	Olimpia Milano	10	8	21.9	.403	.345	.818	2.4	2.2	.7	.1	8.2	8.4
2023–24	Olimpia Milano	29	28	**30.4**	.476	.389	.821	3.7	**2.8**	**1.3**	.1	**15.7**	**16.8**
2024–25	Olimpia Milano	28	28	27.6	.486	.422	.727	3.6	2.6	.7	.0	12.0	12.1
2025–26	Olimpia Milano	35	**35**	26.5	.442	.374	.876	3.2	2.7	.7	.1	12.7	12.8
2026–27	Fenerbahçe	11	11	24.0	.472	.333	.848	4.7	1.7	.5	.1	11.5	13.2
Career		232	201	26.8	.471	.381	.827	3.5	2.0	.8	.1	12.2	12.7

=== EuroCup ===
Year	Team	GP	GS	MPG	FG%	3P%	FT%	RPG	APG	SPG	BPG	PPG	PIR
2017–18	Aquila Trento	14	11	26.1	.512	.357	.743	3.1	2.3	1.2	.1	11.7	11.1
Career		14	11	26.1	.512	.357	.743	3.1	2.3	1.2	.1	11.7	11.1

=== Basketball Champions League ===
Year	Team	GP	GS	MPG	FG%	3P%	FT%	RPG	APG	SPG	BPG	PPG
2016–17	Skyliners Frankfurt	16	15	31.2	.523	.408	.787	5.1	2.1	1.2	.2	13.6
Career		16	15	31.2	.523	.408	.787	5.1	2.1	1.2	.2	13.6

=== Domestic leagues ===
†	Denotes seasons in which Shields won the domestic league

Year	Team	League	GP	MPG	FG%	3P%	FT%	RPG	APG	SPG	BPG	PPG
2016–17	(Germany) Skyliners Frankfurt	BBL	26	32.1	.523	.375	.775	5.3	1.7	1.0	.2	14.0
2016–17	(Italy) Aquila Trento	LBA	18	28.7	.456	.286	.771	3.3	2.2	1.5	.2	10.1
2017–18	(Italy) Aquila Trento	LBA	41	28.4	.482	.343	.776	3.8	2.5	1.0	.1	14.3
2018–19	(Spain) Baskonia	ACB	35	24.3	.505	.314	.739	2.9	1.2	.8	.1	11.1
2019–20†	(Spain) Baskonia	ACB	28	27.1	.463	.360	.809	4.0	1.1	1.1	.2	11.5
2020–21	(Italy) Olimpia Milano	LBA	38	24.4	.420	.359	.778	2.8	3.1	.7	.2	9.0
2021–22†	(Italy) Olimpia Milano	LBA	29	24.9	.502	.400	.792	3.9	2.1	.9	.2	12.2
2022–23†	(Italy) Olimpia Milano	LBA	25	26.0	.422	.315	.862	3.8	2.0	.8	.0	11.0
2023–24†	(Italy) Olimpia Milano	LBA	34	26.3	.450	.421	.820	3.8	2.8	1.1	.1	14.1
2024–25	(Italy) Olimpia Milano	LBA	31	24.6	.547	.442	.781	3.4	2.5	.7	.0	13.0
2025–26†	(Italy) Olimpia Milano	LBA	33	24.7	.472	.356	.831	3.9	2.8	1.1	.2	12.8

=== College ===
Year	Team	GP	GS	MPG	FG%	3P%	FT%	RPG	APG	SPG	BPG	PPG
2012–13	Nebraska	28	19	28.7	**.471**	.359	.676	5.1	.9	.8	**.3**	8.6
2013–14	Nebraska	**32**	**32**	32.6	.443	.316	.721	5.8	1.6	.9	.3	12.8
2014–15	Nebraska	31	31	**35.3**	.440	.195	**.827**	**6.0**	2.2	1.1	.2	15.4
2015–16	Nebraska	30	30	30.7	.470	**.364**	.769	5.1	**2.7**	**1.3**	**.3**	**16.8**
Career		121	112	31.9	.455	.296	.759	5.5	1.8	1.0	.3	13.5

== Personal life ==
Shields is the son of National Football League (NFL) Hall of Famer Will Shields. His mother, Senia, is Danish. He was a high school teammate of Willie Cauley-Stein at Olathe Northwest High School. Shields represented the Denmark national basketball team in U20 competitions and joined the national team again in 2018 for the EuroBasket 2022 pre-qualifiers.
