= Devon Hall =

American basketball player (born 1995)

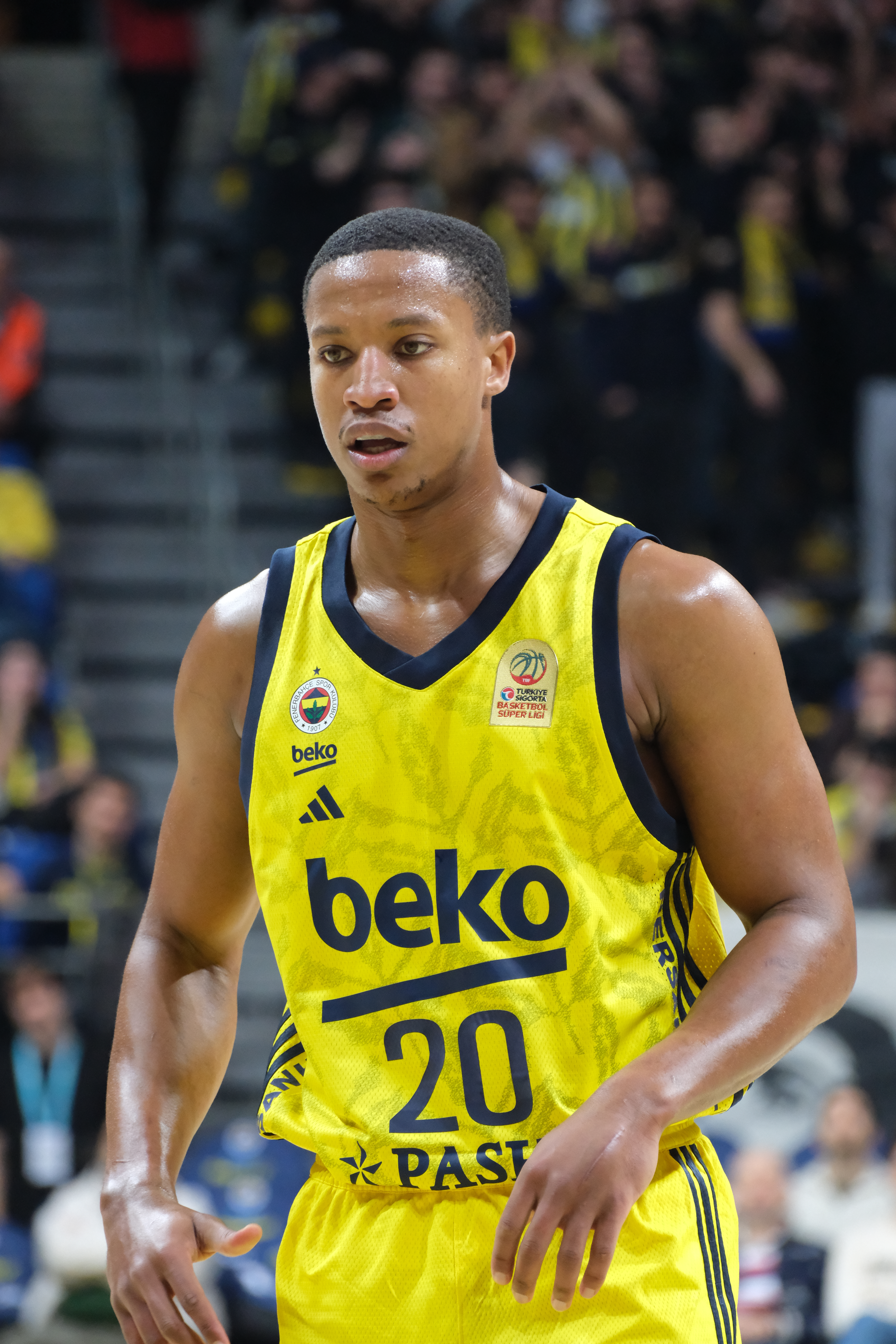
- Hall with Fenerbahçe in 2025

No. 22 – Olimpia Milano
- Position: Small forward / shooting guard
- League: LBA; EuroLeague

Personal information
- Born: July 7, 1995 (age 31) Virginia Beach, Virginia, U.S.
- Listed height: 6 ft 5 in (1.96 m)
- Listed weight: 190 lb (86 kg)

Career information
- High school: Cape Henry Collegiate (Virginia Beach, Virginia)
- College: Virginia (2014–2018)
- NBA draft: 2018: 2nd round, 53rd overall pick
- Drafted by: Oklahoma City Thunder
- Playing career: 2018–present

Career history
- 2018–2019: Cairns Taipans
- 2019–2020: Oklahoma City Blue
- 2019–2020: Oklahoma City Thunder
- 2019–2020: →Oklahoma City Blue
- 2020–2021: Brose Bamberg
- 2021–2024: Olimpia Milano
- 2024–2026: Fenerbahçe
- 2026–present: Olimpia Milano

Career highlights
- EuroLeague champion (2025); 3× Lega Serie A champion (2022–2024); Italian Cup winner (2022); Italian Supercup winner (2026); 2× Turkish Super League champion (2025, 2026); 2× Turkish Cup winner (2025, 2026); Turkish Super Cup winner (2025); Turkish Super Cup MVP (2025); Second-team All-ACC (2018)
- Stats at NBA.com
- Stats at Basketball Reference

Devon Howard Hall (born July 7, 1995) is an American professional basketball player for Olimpia Milano of the Italian Lega Basket Serie A (LBA) and the EuroLeague. He played college basketball for the Virginia Cavaliers.

== Early life ==
Hall is the son of Leslie Guidry and Mark Hall and has an older brother, Mark Jr. He attended Cape Henry Collegiate School in Virginia Beach. He chose Virginia for college because of its high graduation rate for African-Americans.

== College career ==
Hall redshirted his freshman year at Virginia, making him emotional because he wanted to be an impact player. As a redshirt freshman, Hall played 10.6 minutes per game and appeared in only 23 games. Through three seasons, Hall averaged 5.2 points per game. As a senior, he averaged 11.9 points and 4.3 rebounds per game, shooting 44.3 percent from behind the arc on a No. 1 ranked Cavaliers team. Hall scored a career-high 25 points in a 68–51 win against NC State on January 14, 2018. He was a second-team All-ACC selection in 2017–18. He participated in the 2018 Portsmouth Invitational Tournament, averaging 17.3 points, 5.7 rebounds and 3.3 assists in three games.

== Professional career ==
=== Cairns Taipans (2018–2019) ===
Hall was selected with the 53rd overall pick in the 2018 NBA draft by the Oklahoma City Thunder. After the draft, Hall played for the Thunder in the 2018 NBA Summer League. On August 12, 2018, Hall signed with the Cairns Taipans for the 2018–19 NBL season.

=== Oklahoma City Blue (2019) ===
On February 26, 2019, Hall signed with the Oklahoma City Blue of the NBA G League. On December 16, 2019, Hall resigned with the team.

=== Oklahoma City Thunder (2019) ===
On September 4, 2019, Hall signed a two-way contract with the Oklahoma City Thunder. On December 12, 2019, the Oklahoma City Thunder announced that they had waived Hall.

=== Second stint with Oklahoma City Blue (2019–2020) ===
On December 16, 2019, Hall was acquired by the Oklahoma City Blue. On January 13, 2020, Hall tallied 26 points, seven rebounds, four assists, one steal and one block in a 118–111 loss to the Capital City Go-Go. He started 30 games, averaging 15.6 points, 5.7 rebounds, and 4.4 assists per game.

=== Second stint with Oklahoma City Thunder (2020) ===
On June 27, 2020, Hall signed with the Oklahoma City Thunder.

=== Brose Bamberg (2020–2021) ===
On October 30, 2020, Hall signed with Brose Bamberg of the Basketball Bundesliga. He finished his Basketball Champions League campaign averaging 12.4 points per game, in the Basketball Bundesliga he averaged 14.1 points, 3.9 assists and 3.8 rebounds per game.

=== Olimpia Milano (2021–2024) ===
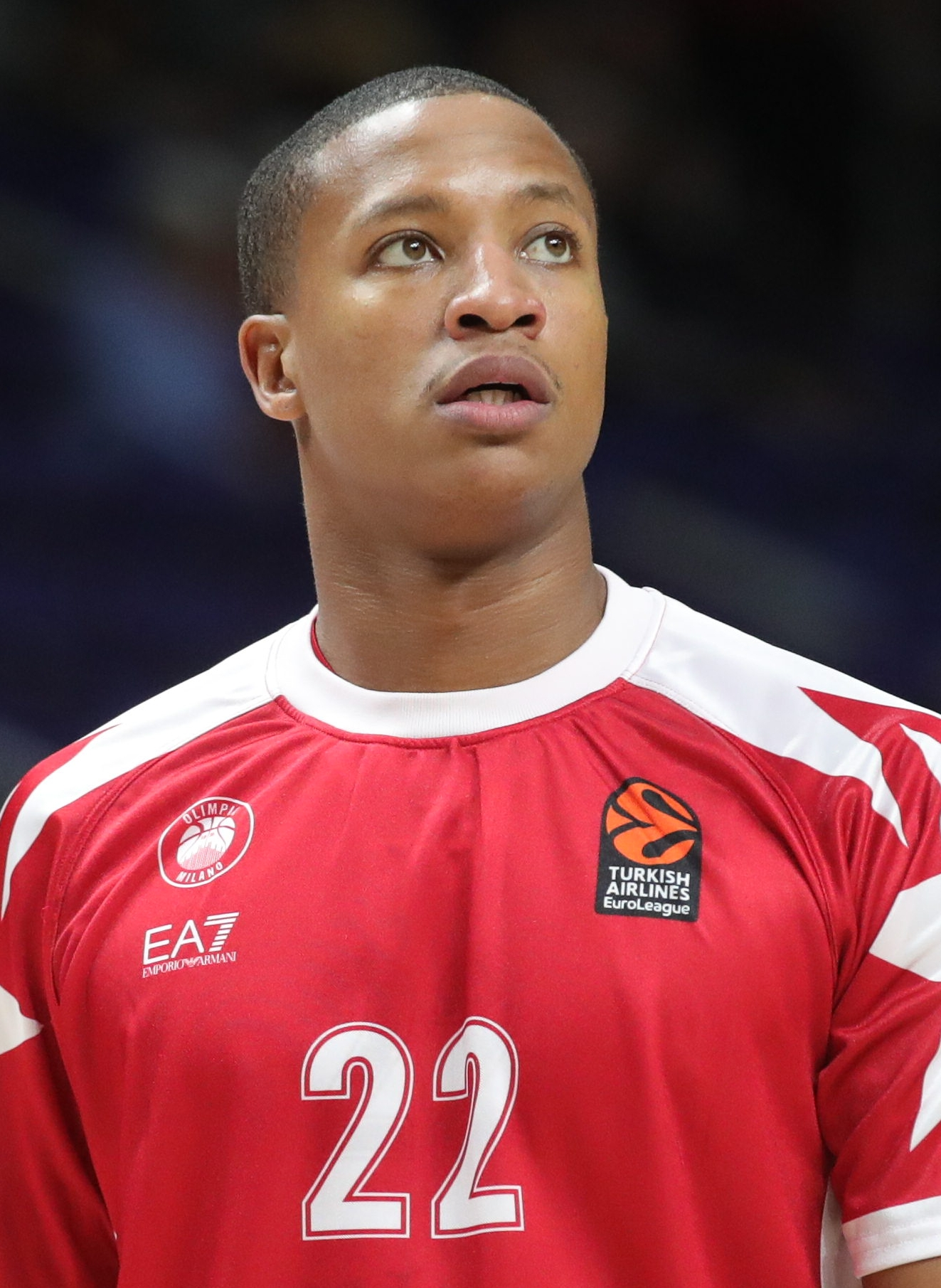
Hall with Olimpia Milano

On June 20, 2021, Hall officially signed a two-year deal with Italian club Olimpia Milano of the Lega Basket Serie A (LBA) and the EuroLeague.

On 21 July 2022, he reached an agreement to extend his contract with the team until the end of the 2023-24 season.

He won three Lega Basket Serie A championship with the club.

=== Fenerbahçe Beko (2024–2026) ===
On June 17, 2024, he signed until the end of 2025-26 season with Fenerbahçe Beko of the Turkish Basketbol Süper Ligi (BSL) and the EuroLeague.

On May 25, 2025, Hall helped Fenerbahçe to their second EuroLeague championship in Abu Dhabi. He helped the team defeat the defending champions Panathinaikos in the semi-final with career high 18 points, and Monaco in the final with 13 points, 3 rebounds, 2 assists and 1 steal.

On 24 September 2025, in the 2025 Turkish Presidential Cup Final against Beşiktaş Gain, Hall led Fenerbahçe to won the cup (85-83) with 23 points, 4 rebounds and 3 assists and became the MVP of the match.

On 1 October 2025, he made man of the match performance with 22 points, 4 rebounds and 2 assists in 26 mins in 2025–26 EuroLeague season opening match against Paris Basketball in a 96-77 victory.

In February 2026, Hall suffered a Meniscus tear in his left knee and underwent surgery.

=== Return to Olimpia Milano (2026–present) ===
On July 2, 2026, Hall returned to Olimpia Milano of the Lega Basket Serie A (LBA) and the EuroLeague.

== International career ==
Devon Hall played for the USA National Team in the world qualifiers during the winter of 2020.

== Career statistics ==
Legend
GP	Games played	GS	Games started	MPG	Minutes per game
FG%	Field-goal percentage	3P%	3-point field-goal percentage	FT%	Free-throw percentage
RPG	Rebounds per game	APG	Assists per game	SPG	Steals per game
BPG	Blocks per game	PPG	Points per game	PIR	Performance index rating
**Bold**	Career high

=== NBA ===
Year	Team	GP	GS	MPG	FG%	3P%	FT%	RPG	APG	SPG	BPG	PPG
2019–20	Oklahoma City	11	0	7.4	.200	.235	.500	.6	1.2	.4	.1	1.8
Career		11	0	7.4	.200	.235	.500	.6	1.2	.4	.1	1.8

=== EuroLeague ===
As of match played 25 November 2025

†	Denotes seasons in which Hall won the EuroLeague

Year	Team	GP	GS	MPG	FG%	3P%	FT%	RPG	APG	SPG	BPG	PPG	PIR
2021–22	Olimpia Milano	**36**	**23**	27.1	.433	.371	.787	2.1	2.2	.6	**.2**	9.9	9.0
2022–23	Olimpia Milano	25	21	**30.0**	.377	.321	.846	2.6	2.3	.9	.1	7.8	7.3
2023–24	Olimpia Milano	32	13	24.1	.453	.385	.838	2.9	1.9	**1.0**	.1	8.2	9.1
2024–25†	Fenerbahçe	32	15	23.3	.536	**.387**	.822	2.2	**3.3**	.5	.1	7.8	8.8
2025–26	Fenerbahçe	13	12	25.4	**.587**	.321	**.917**	**3.7**	3.0	.4	**.2**	**10.6**	**12.1**
Career		138	84	26.0	.501	.363	.835	2.5	2.5	.7	.2	8.7	8.9

=== Basketball Champions League ===
Year	Team	GP	GS	MPG	FG%	3P%	FT%	RPG	APG	SPG	BPG	PPG
2020–21	Brose Bamberg	9	3	23.22	.387	.310	.880	3.1	2.2	.6	.6	12.4
Career		9	3	23.22	.387	.310	.880	3.1	2.2	.6	.6	12.4

=== Domestic leagues ===
As of match played 23 November 2025

†	Denotes seasons in which Hall won the domestic league

Year	Team	League	GP	MPG	FG%	3P%	FT%	RPG	APG	SPG	BPG	PPG
2018–19	(Australia) Cairns Taipans	NBL	28	28.9	.363	.339	.750	4.4	2.5	.7	.3	9.2
2018–19	(United States) Oklahoma City Blue	G League	10	21.1	.373	**.422**	**1.000**	1.4	1.5	.4	.2	7.3
2019–20	(United States) Oklahoma City Blue	G League	30	**31.4**	.455	.360	.860	**5.7**	**4.1**	.7	**.4**	**15.6**
2020–21	(Germany) Brose Bamberg	BBL	33	27.2	.477	.399	.828	3.8	3.9	**.8**	.3	14.1
2021–22 †	(Italy) Olimpia Milano	LBA	**38**	24.4	.420	.359	.778	2.8	3.1	.7	.2	9.0
2022–23 †	(Italy) Olimpia Milano	LBA	36	23.0	.454	.330	.885	2.8	2.4	.5	.1	7.7
2023–24 †	(Italy) Olimpia Milano	LBA	37	24.7	.439	.320	.904	3.5	2.0	.6	.2	8.3
2024–25 †	(Turkey) Fenerbahçe	TBSL	35	22.1	.432	.351	.789	3.0	3.3	.5	.1	7.9
2025–26	(Turkey) Fenerbahçe	TBSL	8	22.1	**.586**	.174	.888	2.6	3.3	.6	.1	8.5

=== College ===
Year	Team	GP	GS	MPG	FG%	3P%	FT%	RPG	APG	SPG	BPG	PPG
2013–14	Virginia	Redshirt										
2014–15	Virginia	23	1	10.6	.400	.333	.455	.7	.8	.4	.0	1.8
2015–16	Virginia	**37**	20	21.9	.375	.333	.765	2.6	2.0	.5	**.3**	4.4
2016–17	Virginia	34	**34**	27.4	.408	.372	.776	**4.4**	1.9	.5	.1	8.4
2017–18	Virginia	34	**34**	**32.1**	**.454**	**.432**	**.894**	4.2	**3.1**	**.9**	.1	**11.7**
Career		128	89	24.0	.419	.389	.807	3.2	2.1	.6	.2	6.9
