= Devon Dotson =

American basketball player (born 1999)

- Dotson with Beşiktaş in 2026

No. 1 – Beşiktaş Fuzul
- Position: Point guard
- League: BSL; EuroLeague

Personal information
- Born: August 2, 1999 (age 27) Chicago, Illinois, U.S.
- Listed height: 6 ft 1 in (1.85 m)
- Listed weight: 185 lb (84 kg)

Career information
- High school: Providence Day (Charlotte, North Carolina)
- College: Kansas (2018–2020)
- NBA draft: 2020: undrafted
- Playing career: 2020–present

Career history
- 2020–2022: Chicago Bulls
- 2021: →Canton Charge
- 2021–2022: →Windy City Bulls
- 2022: Capital City Go-Go
- 2022–2023: Washington Wizards
- 2022–2023: →Capital City Go-Go
- 2023–2024: Capital City Go-Go
- 2024: Obradoiro
- 2024–2025: Joventut Badalona
- 2025–present: Beşiktaş

Career highlights
- Consensus second-team All-American (2020); First-team All-Big 12 (2020); Third-team All-Big 12 (2019); Big 12 All-Freshman Team (2019); McDonald's All-American (2018)
- Stats at NBA.com
- Stats at Basketball Reference

Devon Durrell Dotson (born August 2, 1999) is an American professional basketball player for Beşiktaş of the Basketbol Süper Ligi (BSL). He played college basketball for the Kansas Jayhawks.

== High school career ==
Dotson attended Providence Day School in Charlotte, North Carolina, along with Grant Williams and Joshua Howard, graduating in 2018. During his senior year of high school, Dotson averaged 28.5 points, 6.8 rebounds, and 5.1 assists, leading the school to its sixth conference title. Devon scored 2,607 points becoming the school's all-time leader in points. Devon was a 4 Time All-Conference and 3 Time All-State Selection. He was also a 2-time Charlotte Observer All-Mecklenburg boys' basketball player of the year. Devon ended his high school career by being selected and playing in the 2018 McDonald's All-American Game held in Atlanta, Georgia.

=== Recruiting ===
On October 13, 2017, Dotson committed to playing college basketball at the University of Kansas, choosing the Jayhawks over offers from UCLA, Maryland, Florida, UNC, and other schools.

College recruiting
Name	Hometown	School	Height	Weight	Commit date
Devon Dotson; PG	Charlotte, NC	Providence Day School (NC)	6 ft 2 in (1.88 m)	175 lb (79 kg)	Oct 13, 2017
Devon Dotson; PG	Recruit ratings: Rivals: 247Sports: ESPN: (90)				
Overall recruit ranking: Rivals: 20 247Sports: 21 ESPN: 24
Note: In many cases, Scout, Rivals, 247Sports, On3, and ESPN may conflict in their listings of height and weight.; In these cases, the average was taken. ESPN grades are on a 100-point scale.; Sources: "Kansas 2018 Basketball Commitments". Rivals.; "2018 Kansas Jayhawks Recruiting Class". ESPN.; "2018 Team Ranking". Rivals.

== College career ==
As a freshman, Dotson began the season as the Jayhawks starting point guard playing national ranked Michigan State Spartans in the 2018 Champions Classic on November 6, 2018. In his first collegiate game, Dotson pitched in 16 points and three steals, showcasing his quickness with a number of layups. Dotson was on the watch list for the 2019 Bob Cousy Point Guard of the Year Award, the Naismith Memorial Basketball Hall of Fame announced on October 15, 2018.

In his 2018–19 freshman season, Dotson averaged 12.3 points, 3.7 rebounds, 3.5 assists, and 1.4 steals a game while shooting 36.3% from three-point territory. On February 11, 2019, Dotson led the Jayhawks to a win in overtime against the TCU Horned Frogs in Fort Worth, Texas, by scoring 25 points, grabbing 10 rebounds, and passing for 5 assists with 6 turnovers in 45 minutes of playing time. On February 13, 2019, Dotson was named national freshman of the week by CBS Sports and the U.S. Basketball Writers Association for his play in the TCU game among others.

During his sophomore season, Dotson scored a career-high 31 points in a 90–84 overtime win over Dayton on November 27. He was named co-MVP of the Maui Jim Maui Invitational and was named Big 12 player of the week on December 2. Dotson missed a game against Oklahoma on January 14, 2020, with a hip injury. At the conclusion of the regular season, Dotson was named to the First Team All-Big 12. He averaged 18.1 points, 4.1 rebounds, and 4.0 assists per game as a sophomore. Following the season, he declared for the 2020 NBA draft and hired an agent. After going undrafted, Dotson signed with the Chicago Bulls.

== Professional career ==
=== Chicago Bulls (2020–2022) ===
After going undrafted in the 2020 NBA draft, Dotson signed with his hometown team the Chicago Bulls, on a two-way contract with their NBA G League affiliate, the Windy City Bulls. As the Windy City Bulls opted out of the 2020–21 G League season, Dotson was assigned to the Canton Charge, making his debut in their season opener on February 11, 2021.

On August 19, 2021, the Bulls announced that they had re-signed Dotson to a two-way contract. During the 2021–22 season, Dotson appeared in 11 games with the Bulls and averaged 2.6 points and 1.4 assists per game. On January 16, 2022, he was waived by the Bulls.

=== Windy City Bulls (2022) ===
On January 22, 2022, Dotson was re-acquired by the Windy City Bulls. However, he was waived on February 4. Three days later, Dotson was re-acquired by the Bulls.

=== Capital City Go-Go / Washington Wizards (2022–2024) ===
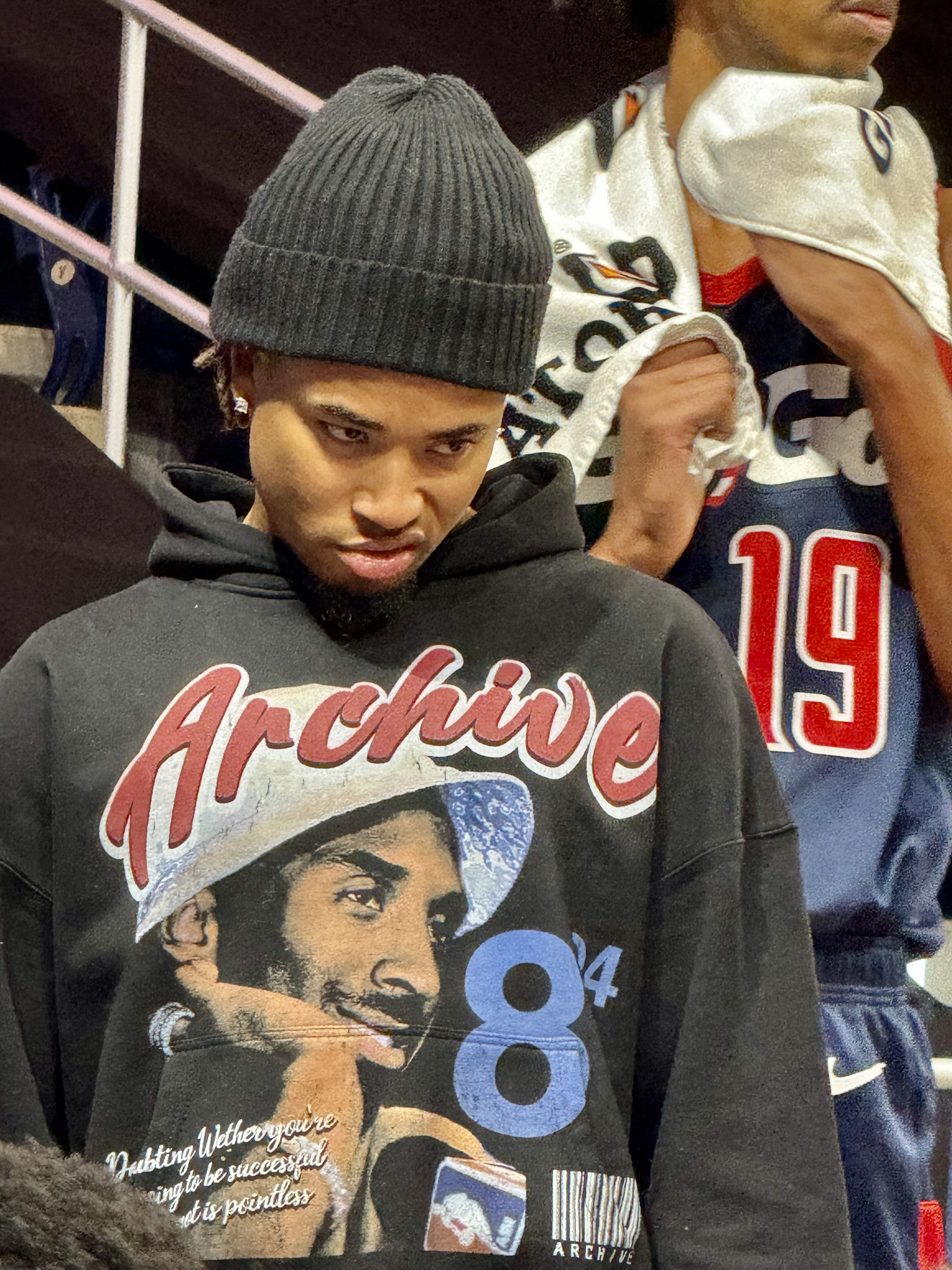
Devon Dotson intensely watching the huddle during a timeout at a Capital City Go Go game

On August 25, 2022, Dotson was traded to the Capital City Go-Go and on November 20, he signed a two-way contract with the Washington Wizards. However, on January 17, 2023, he was waived and two days later, he was reacquired by the Go-Go.

On October 19, 2023, Dotson re-signed with the Wizards, but was waived the next day. On October 30, he returned to Capital City and on March 15, 2024, he was bought out by the Go-Go.

=== Spain (2024–2025) ===
On March 18, 2024, Dotson signed with Monbus Obradoiro of the Spanish Liga ACB.

On July 16, 2024, he signed for another Liga ACB team, Joventut Badalona. Dotson signed a two season contract. On June 28, 2025, Joventut announced Dotson was leaving the team after activating his contract's release clause.

=== Beşiktaş (2025–present) ===
On July 13, 2025, Dotson signed with Beşiktaş Gain of the Turkish Basketbol Süper Ligi.

== Career statistics ==
Legend
GP	Games played	GS	Games started	MPG	Minutes per game
FG%	Field goal percentage	3P%	3-point field goal percentage	FT%	Free throw percentage
RPG	Rebounds per game	APG	Assists per game	SPG	Steals per game
BPG	Blocks per game	PPG	Points per game	**Bold**	Career high

=== NBA ===
Year	Team	GP	GS	MPG	FG%	3P%	FT%	RPG	APG	SPG	BPG	PPG
2020–21	Chicago	**11**	0	4.5	**.524**	.143	–	.5	.6	.4	.0	2.1
2021–22	Chicago	**11**	0	7.7	.478	.222	**.556**	.8	**1.4**	.1	.0	**2.6**
2022–23	Washington	6	0	**8.8**	.100	**.250**	–	**1.7**	1.3	**.8**	.0	.5
Career		28	0	6.7	.426	.200	.556	.9	1.1	.4	.0	2.0

=== College ===
Year	Team	GP	GS	MPG	FG%	3P%	FT%	RPG	APG	SPG	BPG	PPG
2018–19	Kansas	**36**	**36**	32.4	**.482**	**.363**	.782	3.7	3.5	1.4	**.1**	12.3
2019–20	Kansas	30	30	**34.9**	.468	.309	**.830**	**4.1**	**4.0**	**2.1**	**.1**	**18.1**
Career		66	66	33.6	.474	.332	.808	3.8	3.7	1.7	.1	14.9

== Personal life ==
Devon was born in Chicago, the son of Dana and Angela Dotson and has two siblings, a brother and a sister. He became interested in basketball as a youngster and later expressed admiration for the playing style of Derrick Rose. Dotson, on occasion, would pattern parts of his game based on that of Rose's by simulating his moves on the court. He also has worn the No. 1 like Rose during Rose's Chicago Bulls playing days.

Currently while developing his talents in the Euros, Established a relationship with Allie Perry who was a D-1 athlete at Marshall University.
