= 2018 Turkish Basketball Presidential Cup =

Fenerbahçe Doğuş	Anadolu Efes
62	65
- Date: 3 October 2018
- Venue: Ankara Arena, Ankara
- MVP: (Turkey) Doğuş Balbay

The 2018 Turkish Basketball Presidential Cup (Turkish: 2018 Erkekler Basketbol Cumhurbaşkanlığı Kupası) was the 34th edition of the Turkish Basketball Presidential Cup. The game was played between Fenerbahçe Doğuş, champions of the 2017–18 Basketbol Süper Ligi, and Anadolu Efes, the winners of the 2018 Turkish Cup.

Anadolu Efes made their 22nd appearance and won their 11th championship, while this was Fenerbahçe's 15th President's Cup final.

== Venue ==
Ankara	2018 Turkish Basketball Presidential Cup (Turkey)
Ankara Arena	2018 Turkish Basketball Presidential Cup (Turkey)
Capacity: 10,400	2018 Turkish Basketball Presidential Cup (Turkey)

== Match details ==
Doğuş Balbay, who had 13 points, 5 rebounds and 3 assists in the game, was named the Presidential Cup MVP.

3 October 2018	Fenerbahçe Doğuş	62–65	Anadolu Efes	Ankara
20:00 (TRT)	Scoring by quarter: 15–17, 15–11, 6–16, 26–21
	Pts: Sloukas 24; Rebs: Melli, Düverioğlu 6 Asts: Sloukas 5	Boxscore	Pts: Moerman, Balbay 13; Rebs: Moerman 9 Asts: Micić, Simon 4	Arena: Ankara Arena; Referees: Emin Moğulkoç, Özlem Yalman, Ahmet Tatlıcı

Fenerbahçe	Anadolu Efes

2018 Turkish Presidential Cup champions
Anadolu Efes
(11th title)
