= Turkish Basketball Presidential Cup =

Turkish men's basketball competition

Turkish Presidential Cup
- Current season, competition or edition: 2026 Turkish Basketball Presidential Cup
- Founded: 1985; 41 years ago
- No. of teams: 2
- Country: Turkey
- Confederation: FIBA Europe
- Most recent champions: Fenerbahçe (9th title)
- Most titles: Anadolu Efes (14 titles)
- Broadcaster: beIN Sports
- Related competitions: Basketball Super League; Turkish Cup
- Website: tbf.org.tr

The Turkish Basketball Presidential Cup (Turkish: Cumhurbaşkanlığı Kupası), sometimes referred to as Turkish Basketball Super Cup, is the professional men's basketball super cup competition that takes place each year in Turkey. The competition began in the year 1985. One game is held to determine the winner of the competition. It is played between the winners of the Basketbol Süper Ligi and the winners of the Turkish Cup season. If the same team wins both the Turkish Super League and the Turkish Cup in the same season, then the competition takes place between the two league finalists from the Super League.

== Performance by club ==
Teams shown in italics are defunct.

Club	Wins	Losses	Seasons won
Anadolu Efes	14	11	1986, 1992, 1993, 1996, 1998, 2000, 2006, 2009, 2010, 2015, 2018, 2019, 2022, 2024
Fenerbahçe	9	11	1990, 1991, 1994, 2007, 2013, 2016, 2017, 2025, 2026
Ülker	6	2	1995, 2001, 2002, 2003, 2004, 2005
Galatasaray	2	4	1985, 2011
Karşıyaka	2	1	1987, 2014
Türk Telekom	2	1	1997, 2008
Tofaş	1	2	1999
Beşiktaş	1	3	2012
Eczacıbaşı	1	1	1988
Çukurova Sanayi	1	–	1989
Paşabahçe	–	1	
Alpella	–	1	
Bandırma Basketbol	–	1	

== Finals ==
Year	Winners	Score	Runners-up	MVP
1985	Galatasaray	85–84	Fenerbahçe	—N/a
1986	Efes Pilsen	101–100	Galatasaray	—N/a
1987	Karşıyaka	81–65	Beşiktaş	—N/a
1988	Eczacıbaşı	89–87	Fenerbahçe	—N/a
1989	Çukurova Sanayi	82–74	Eczacıbaşı	—N/a
1990	Fenerbahçe	95–86	Galatasaray	—N/a
1991	Fenerbahçe	75–72	Tofaş SAS	—N/a
1992	Efes Pilsen	102–98	Paşabahçe	—N/a
1993	Efes Pilsen	88–63	Tofaş	—N/a
1994	Fenerbahçe	85–74	Efes Pilsen	—N/a
1995	Ülker	70–55	Galatasaray	—N/a
1996	Efes Pilsen	69–44	Türk Telekom	—N/a
1997	Türk Telekom	78–75	Efes Pilsen	—N/a
1998	Efes Pilsen	76–63	Ülker	—N/a
1999	Tofaş	77–66	Efes Pilsen	—N/a
2000	Efes Pilsen	66–65	Ülker	—N/a
2001	Ülker	94–87	Efes Pilsen	—N/a
2002	Ülker	83–78	Efes Pilsen	—N/a
2003	Ülker	68–66	Efes Pilsen	—N/a
2004	Ülker	68–66	Efes Pilsen	—N/a
2005	Ülker	83–72	Efes Pilsen	—N/a
2006	Efes Pilsen	77–61	Alpella	—N/a
2007	Fenerbahçe Ülker	79–77	Efes Pilsen	—N/a
2008	Türk Telekom	83–79	Fenerbahçe Ülker	—N/a
2009	Efes Pilsen	81–74	Fenerbahçe Ülker	—N/a
2010	Efes Pilsen	79–77	Fenerbahçe Ülker	—N/a
2011	Galatasaray Medical Park	103–97	Fenerbahçe Ülker	—N/a
2012	Beşiktaş	77–75	Anadolu Efes	—N/a
2013	Fenerbahçe Ülker	64–62	Galatasaray Liv Hospital	—N/a
2014	Pınar Karşıyaka	77–75	Fenerbahçe Ülker	
2015	Anadolu Efes	76–74	Pınar Karşıyaka	
2016	Fenerbahçe	77–69	Anadolu Efes	(Turkey) Bobby Dixon
2017	Fenerbahçe Doğuş	75–64	Banvit	(Italy) Luigi Datome
2018	Anadolu Efes	65–62	Fenerbahçe	(Turkey) Doğuş Balbay
2019	Anadolu Efes	79–74	Fenerbahçe Beko	(Croatia) Krunoslav Simon
2020	Cancelled due to the COVID-19 pandemic.			
2021	Cancelled due to the COVID-19 pandemic.			
2022	Anadolu Efes	71–62	Fenerbahçe Beko	(Croatia) Ante Žižić
2023	Cancelled after the 2023 Turkey–Syria earthquake.			
2024	Anadolu Efes	83–82	Fenerbahçe Beko	(United States) Elijah Bryant
2025	Fenerbahçe Beko	85–83	Beşiktaş Gain	(United States) Devon Hall
2026	Fenerbahçe Beko	72–59	Beşiktaş Gain	(United States) Shavon Shields

== See also ==
- Turkish Men's Basketball League
- Turkish Men's Basketball Cup
- Turkish Women's Basketball League
- Turkish Women's Basketball Cup
- Turkish Women's Basketball Presidential Cup
