= 2026–27 Anadolu Efes S.K. season =

44th season

Anadolu Efes
2026–27 season
- President: Tuncay Özilhan
- Head coach: Pablo Laso
- Arena: Basketball Development Center
- Basketbol Süper Ligi: Regular season
- EuroLeague: Regular season
- VTB League Supercup: Winners

The 2026–27 season is Anadolu Efes's 51th season in the existence of the club. The team plays in the Basketball Super League and in the EuroLeague.

== Players ==
=== Current roster ===
Note: Flags indicate national team eligibility at FIBA-sanctioned events. Players may hold other non-FIBA nationalities not displayed.

Anadolu Efes roster
Players
Coaches

Pos.	No.	Nat.	Name	Ht.	Wt.	Age
F	2	(Turkey)	Karutasu, Darius	2.13 m (7 ft 0 in)	96 kg (212 lb)	17 – 30 March 2009
G	3	(Poland)	Loyd, Jordan	1.93 m (6 ft 4 in)	95 kg (209 lb)	33 – 27 July 1993
F	4	(Spain)	Yusta, Santiago	2.00 m (6 ft 7 in)	83 kg (183 lb)	29 – 28 April 1997
PF	5	(Croatia)	Šarić, Dario	2.11 m (6 ft 11 in)	102 kg (225 lb)	32 – 8 April 1994
C	9	(Greece)	Papagiannis, Georgios	2.20 m (7 ft 3 in)	121 kg (267 lb)	29 – 3 July 1997
G/F	10	(France)	Cordinier, Isaïa (injured)	1.98 m (6 ft 6 in)	89 kg (196 lb)	29 – 28 November 1996
PG	11	(Romania)	Russell, Fatts	1.80 m (5 ft 11 in)	75 kg (165 lb)	28 – 6 May 1998
G/F	15	(United States)	Dozier, PJ	2.00 m (6 ft 7 in)	93 kg (205 lb)	30 – 25 October 1996
PG	16	(Turkey)	Fenemen, Rüzgar	1.86 m (6 ft 1 in)	75 kg (165 lb)	18 – 3 April 2008
G/F	17	(United States)	Malcolm, Collin	2.00 m (6 ft 7 in)	91 kg (201 lb)	29 – 2 July 1997
F/C	19	(Turkey)	Yıldızlı, Burak Can	2.02 m (6 ft 8 in)	82 kg (181 lb)	32 – 22 April 1994
C	20	(Angola)	Fernando, Bruno (injured)	2.09 m (6 ft 10 in)	109 kg (240 lb)	28 – 15 August 1998
PG	22	(United States)	Payne, Cameron	1.89 m (6 ft 2 in)	83 kg (183 lb)	32 – 8 August 1994
SG	23	(Turkey)	Mutaf, Sarper David	1.97 m (6 ft 6 in)	85 kg (187 lb)	24 – 14 June 2002
F/C	24	(Turkey)	Osmani, Ercan	2.13 m (7 ft 0 in)	102 kg (225 lb)	28 – 4 August 1998
PG	32	(France)	Strazel, Matthew	1.84 m (6 ft 0 in)	81 kg (179 lb)	24 – 5 August 2002
SF	33	(Turkey)	Yılmaz, Erkan (C)	1.95 m (6 ft 5 in)	87 kg (192 lb)	28 – 3 December 1997
PG	55	(United States)	James, Mike (injured)	1.83 m (6 ft 0 in)	89 kg (196 lb)	36 – 18 August 1990
F/C	88	(The Bahamas)	Jones, Kai	2.12 m (6 ft 11 in)	100 kg (220 lb)	25 – 19 January 2001

Head coach

- (Spain) Pablo Laso

Assistant coach(es)

- (Slovenia) Rado Trifunović
- (Croatia) Tomislav Mijatović
- (Turkey) Cenk Akyol

Legend

- (C) Team captain
- Injured

- Roster
Updated: November 16, 2026

=== EuroLeague Depth chart ===
Pos.	Starting 5	Bench 1	Bench 2	Bench 3	Inactive
C	Kai Jones	Georgios Papagiannis			Bruno Fernando (injured)
PF	Dario Šarić	Ercan Osmani			Burak Can Yıldızlı
SF	Collin Malcolm	Santiago Yusta	Erkan Yılmaz	Darius Karutasu	Isaïa Cordinier (injured)
SG	Jordan Loyd	PJ Dozier	Sarper David Mutaf
PG	Cameron Payne	Matthew Strazel	Fatts Russell	Rüzgar Fenemen	Mike James (injured)

=== BSL Depth chart ===
Pos.	Starting 5	Bench 1	Bench 2	Bench 3	Inactive
C	Bruno Fernando*	Kai Jones*	Georgios Papagiannis*
PF	Dario Šarić*	Burak Can Yıldızlı	Ercan Osmani	Santiago Yusta*
SF	Collin Malcolm*	Erkan Yılmaz	Darius Karutasu	PJ Dozier*	Isaïa Cordinier* (injured)
SG	Sarper David Mutaf	Jordan Loyd*		Cameron Payne*
PG	Matthew Strazel*	Fatts Russell*		Rüzgar Fenemen	Mike James* (injured)

- BSL requires a maximum of 7 registered foreign players per squad, with no more than 4 foreign players allowed on the court at any given time. Crucially, at least 1 Turkish player must remain on the floor during every second of game play. Foreign players are shown with an asterisk (*).

=== Transactions ===
==== In ====
No.	Pos.	Nat.	Name	Age	Moving from		Contract	Ends	Date	Source
5	PF	(Croatia)	Dario Šarić	32	Sacramento Kings	(United States)	June 2028	June 16, 2026		
32	PG	(France)	Matthew Strazel	23	AS Monaco	(France)	June 2029	June 25, 2026		
4	F	(Spain)	Santiago Yusta	29	Basket Zaragoza	(Spain)	June 2027	July 8, 2026		
20	C	(Angola)	Bruno Fernando	27	Partizan	(Serbia)	June 2028	July 10, 2026		
55	PG	(United States)	Mike James	35	AS Monaco	(France)	June 2027	July 11, 2026		
17	G/F	(United States)	Collin Malcolm	29	Hapoel Tel Aviv	(United States)	June 2027	July 27, 2026		
11	PG	(Romania)	Fatts Russell	28	U-BT Cluj-Napoca	(Romania)	June 2027	August 14, 2026		
22	PG	(United States)	Cameron Payne	32	Philadelphia 76ers	(United States)	June 2027	October 3, 2026		

==== Out ====
No.	Pos.	Nat.	Name	Age	Moving to		Date	Source
5	PG	(United States)	Saben Lee	26	Žalgiris	(Lithuania)	June 9, 2026	
21	PG	(United States)	Cole Swider	27			June 9, 2026	
11	F/C	(Latvia)	Rolands Šmits	30	Ningbo Rockets	(China)	June 15, 2026	
8	G	(Germany)	Nick Weiler-Babb	30	ASVEL	(France)	June 15, 2026	
17	G	(France)	Vincent Poirier	32			June 22, 2026	
0	G	(Turkey)	Shane Larkin	33	Fenerbahçe	(Turkey)	June 30, 2026	
2	G	(Turkey)	Şehmus Hazer	27	Galatasaray	(Turkey)	June 30, 2026	
1	G	(France)	Rodrigue Beaubois	38			July 14, 2026	

==== Contract renewals ====
No.	Pos.	Nat.	Name	Age	Cont.	Date	Source
3	G	(Poland) (United States)	Jordan Loyd	32	1+1-year	16 June 2026	

== Pre-season and friendlies ==
=== Friendly match ===
4 September 2026 TÜBAD Mehmet Baturalp Tournament	Anadolu Efes (Turkish Basketball Federation)	75–77	(Turkish Basketball Federation) Esenler Erokspor	Istanbul
		Boxscore		Arena: Basketbol Gelişim Merkezi

5 September 2026 TÜBAD Mehmet Baturalp Tournament	Anadolu Efes (Turkish Basketball Federation)	101–72	(Hellenic Basketball Federation) AEK	Istanbul
		Boxscore		Arena: Basketbol Gelişim Merkezi

7 September 2026 Friendly	Anadolu Efes (Turkish Basketball Federation)	76–71	(Turkish Basketball Federation) Trabzonspor	Istanbul
		Boxscore		Arena: Basketbol Gelişim Merkezi

9 September 2026 Gloria Cup	Anadolu Efes (Turkish Basketball Federation)	85–74	(Russian Basketball Federation) Lokomotiv Kuban	Belek, Antalya, Turkey
		Boxscore		Arena: Gloria Sports Arena

12 September 2026 Gloria Cup	Anadolu Efes (Turkish Basketball Federation)	75–79	(United Arab Emirates Basketball Association) Dubai Basketball	Belek, Antalya, Turkey
		Boxscore		Arena: Gloria Sports Arena

13 September 2026 Gloria Cup	Anadolu Efes (Turkish Basketball Federation)	87–69	(Romanian Basketball Federation) U-BT Cluj-Napoca	Belek, Antalya, Turkey
		Boxscore		Arena: Gloria Sports Arena

18 September 2026 VTB United League SuperCup	Zenit Saint Petersburg (Russian Basketball Federation)	76–100	(Turkish Basketball Federation) Anadolu Efes	Moscow, Russia
		Boxscore		Arena: VTB Arena

19 September 2026 VTB United League SuperCup	UNICS Kazan (Russian Basketball Federation)	79–91	(Turkish Basketball Federation) Anadolu Efes	Moscow, Russia
		Boxscore		Arena: VTB Arena

20 September 2026 VTB United League SuperCup	Lokomotiv Kuban (Russian Basketball Federation)	82–88	(Turkish Basketball Federation) Anadolu Efes	Moscow, Russia
		Boxscore		Arena: VTB Arena

== Competitions ==
=== Overview ===
Competition	First match	Last match	Starting round	Record							
Competition	First match	Last match	Starting round	Pld	W	D	L	PF	PA	PD	Win %
Basketball Super League	27 September 2026		Round 1	9	6	0	3	754	703	+51	66.67
EuroLeague	24 September 2026		Round 1	13	6	0	7	1,127	1,123	+4	46.15
Total				22	12	0	10	1,881	1,826	+55	54.55

Last updated: 22 November 2026
Source: Competitions

=== Basketball Super League ===
==== League table ====
Pos	Team	Pld	W	L	PF	PA	PD	Pts	Qualification or relegation
1	Bahçeşehir Koleji	9	8	1	856	741	+115	17	Advance to playoffs
2	Türk Telekom	9	7	2	764	678	+86	16	Advance to playoffs
3	Anadolu Efes	9	6	3	754	703	+51	15	Advance to playoffs
4	Fenerbahçe Tarfin	9	6	3	773	724	+49	15	Advance to playoffs
5	Galatasaray MCT Technic	9	5	4	782	702	+80	14	Advance to playoffs

Updated to match(es) played on 22 November 2026. Source: Basketbol Süper Ligi

==== Results summary ====
Overall						Home					Away				
Pld	W	L	PF	PA	PD	W	L	PF	PA	PD	W	L	PF	PA	PD
9	6	3	754	703	+51	3	1	360	327	+33	3	2	394	376	+18

Last updated: 22 November 2026.
Source: bsl.org.tr

==== Results by round ====
Round	1	2	3	4	5	6	7	8	9	10	11	12	13	14	15	16	17	18	19	20	21	22	23	24	25	26	27	28	29	30
Ground	H	A	H	A	H	A	H	A	A	H	A	H	A	H	A	A	H	A	H											
Result	W	W	W	L	W	W	L	L	W																					
Position	3	2	3	2	3	2	4	4	3																					

Updated to match(es) played on 22 November 2026. Source: TBF.org.tr
A = Away; H = Home; W = Win; L = Loss

==== Matches ====
Note: All times are TRT (UTC+3) as listed by Turkish Basketball Federation.

27 September 2026 1	Anadolu Efes	95–81	Beşiktaş	Istanbul
20:30	Scoring by quarter: 20–16, 26–21, 29–22, 20–22
	Pts: Šarić 16; Rebs: Osmani 6 Asts: James 6 PIR: Šarić 19	Boxscore	Pts: Brown 13; Rebs: Birsen 9 Asts: Birsen, Uğurlu 4 PIR: three players 13	Arena: Basketbol Gelişim Merkezi; Referees: Emin Moğulkoç, Zafer Yılmaz, Duhan Köyiçi

4 October 2026 2	Pizzabulls Bandırma Bordo	79–85	Anadolu Efes	Bandırma, Balıkesir
13:00	Scoring by quarter: 20–19, 18–26, 15–16, 26–24
	Pts: Peterson 25; Rebs: Aldridge 9 Asts: Gordon 4 PIR: Hankins, Peterson 15	Boxscore	Pts: Loyd 15; Rebs: Jones 10; Asts: Strazel 9 PIR: Jones 23	Arena: Bandırma 17 Eylül Üniversitesi Spor Salonu; Attendance: 2,863; Referees: Alper Özgök, Polat Parlak, Tolga Akkuşoğlu

11 October 2026 3	Anadolu Efes	85–76	Yukatel Denizli Basket	Istanbul
15:30	Scoring by quarter: 26–16, 24–18, 22–27, 13–15
	Pts: Šarić 18; Rebs: Jones 9 Asts: Russell, Strazel 5 PIR: Šarić 23	Boxscore	Pts: Bailey, Meeks 22; Rebs: Agva 10; Asts: Ivey 7 PIR: Meeks 27	Arena: Basketbol Gelişim Merkezi; Referees: Alper Altuğ Köselerli, Ali Şakacı, Murat Ciner

19 October 2026 4	Esenler Erokspor	73–70	Anadolu Efes	Istanbul
19:00	Scoring by quarter: 24–18, 19–25, 9–15, 21–12
	Pts: Davis Jr. 18; Rebs: Yebo 9 Asts: van der Vuurst 5 PIR: Yebo 17	Boxscore	Pts: Malcolm 15; Rebs: Šarić8; Asts: Šarić, Yılmaz 5 PIR: Malcolm 22	Arena: Akatlar Arena; Attendance: 535; Referees: Ahmet Tatlıcı, Ziya Özorhon, Fatih Arslanoğlu

25 October 2026 5	Anadolu Efes	93–77	Biotekno Körfez Basket	Istanbul
13:00	Scoring by quarter: 24–14, 25–18, 18–30, 26–15
	Pts: Payne 17; Rebs: Fernando 8 Asts: Russell 7 PIR: Malcolm 18	Boxscore	Pts: Davis 18; Rebs: Reese 7 Asts: Buie 6 PIR: Akay 16	Arena: Basketbol Gelişim Merkezi; Attendance: 650; Referees: Özlem Yalman, Tolga Edis, Samet Biner

2 November 2026 6	Petkim Spor	77–87	Anadolu Efes	Aliağa, İzmir
18:00	Scoring by quarter: 18–16, 26–25, 9–22, 24–24
	Pts: Horton 16; Rebs: Horton 10; Asts: Hanlan 5 PIR: Horton 22	Boxscore	Pts: Loyd, Payne 16; Rebs: Šarić 10; Asts: Payne 7 PIR: Payne 19	Arena: Enka Sport Hall; Attendance: 2,250; Referees: Hüseyin Çelik, Can Mavisu, Batuhan Söylemezoğlu

8 November 2026 7	Anadolu Efes	87–93	Tofaş	Istanbul
15:30	Scoring by quarter: 21–21, 17–25, 31–21, 18–26
	Pts: Russell 14; Rebs: Osmani 5 Asts: Russell 12; PIR: Russell 18	Boxscore	Pts: Jones 20; Rebs: Thurman 6 Asts: Reynolds Jr. 6 PIR: Carter II 21	Arena: Basketbol Gelişim Merkezi; Attendance: 1,037; Referees: Ali Şakacı, Alper Özgök, Ayşe Nur Yazıcıoğlu

15 November 2026 8	Fenerbahçe Tarfin	77–75	Anadolu Efes	Istanbul
20:30	Scoring by quarter: 18–32, 17–11, 25–11, 17–21
	Pts: Clyburn 13; Rebs: Clyburn 7 Asts: Forrest 4 PIR: Powell 19	Boxscore	Pts: Osmani 18; Rebs: Loyd 5 Asts: Šarić 5 PIR: Osmani 22	Arena: Ülker Sports and Event Hall; Attendance: 8,583; Referees: Mehmet Karabilecen, Tolga Akkuşoğlu, Kerem Yılmaz

22 November 2026 9	Trabzonspor	70–77	Anadolu Efes	Trabzon
15:30	Scoring by quarter: 20–23, 14–18, 18–22, 18–14
	Pts: Boston Jr. 26; Rebs: Arslan 7 Asts: Öncel 5 PIR: Boston Jr. 22	Boxscore	Pts: Loyd 21; Rebs: Šarić 9 Asts: Payne 8 PIR: Šarić 21	Arena: Hayri Gür Arena; Attendance: 3,689; Referees: Kerem Baki, Fatih Arslanoğlu, Duhan Köyiçi

6 December 2026 10	Anadolu Efes	vs.	Türk Telekom	Istanbul
15:30
		Boxscore		Arena: Basketbol Gelişim Merkezi

12 December 2026 11	Galatasaray MCT Technic	vs.	Anadolu Efes	Istanbul
20:30
		Boxscore		Arena: Sinan Erdem Dome

20 December 2026 12	Anadolu Efes	vs.	Bahçeşehir Koleji	Istanbul
18:00
		Boxscore		Arena: Basketbol Gelişim Merkezi

TBD 13	Glint Çayırova Belediyesi	vs.	Anadolu Efes	Kocaeli
TRT (UTC+3)
		Boxscore		Arena: Çayırova Spor Salonu

TBD 14	Anadolu Efes	vs.	Karşıyaka	Istanbul
		Boxscore		Arena: Basketbol Gelişim Merkezi

TBD 15	Bursaspor	vs.	Anadolu Efes	Bursa
TRT (UTC+3)
		Boxscore		Arena: Tofaş Nilüfer Spor Salonu

TBD 16	Beşiktaş	vs.	Anadolu Efes	Istanbul
TRT (UTC+3)
		Boxscore		Arena: Basketball Development Center

TBD 17	Anadolu Efes	vs.	Pizzabulls Bandırma Bordo	Istanbul
		Boxscore		Arena: Basketbol Gelişim Merkezi

TBD 18	Yukatel Denizli Basket	vs.	Anadolu Efes	Denizli
TRT (UTC+3)
		Boxscore		Arena: Pamukkale University Arena

TBD 19	Anadolu Efes	vs.	Esenler Erokspor	Istanbul
		Boxscore		Arena: Basketbol Gelişim Merkezi

TBD 20	Biotekno Körfez Basket	vs.	Anadolu Efes	Kocaeli
		Boxscore		Arena: Şehit Polis Recep Topaloğlu Sports Hall

TBD 21	Anadolu Efes	vs.	Petkim Spor	Istanbul
		Boxscore		Arena: Basketbol Gelişim Merkezi

TBD 22	Tofaş	vs.	Anadolu Efes	Bursa
		Boxscore		Arena: Tofaş Nilüfer Spor Salonu

TBD 23	Anadolu Efes	vs.	Fenerbahçe Tarfin	Istanbul
		Boxscore		Arena: Basketbol Gelişim Merkezi

TBD 24	Anadolu Efes	vs.	Trabzonspor	Istanbul
		Boxscore		Arena: Basketbol Gelişim Merkezi

=== EuroLeague ===
==== League table ====
Pos	Team	Pld	W	L	PF	PA	PD
11	(Basketball Federation of Serbia) Partizan Mozzart Bet	13	7	6	1005	1001	+4
12	(French Federation of Basketball) Paris Basketball	13	7	6	1168	1200	−32
13	(Turkish Basketball Federation) Anadolu Efes	13	6	7	1127	1123	+4
14	(Turkish Basketball Federation) Beşiktaş	13	6	7	1132	1156	−24
15	(Italian Basketball Federation) Virtus Bologna	13	5	8	1118	1169	−51

Updated to match(es) played on 20 November 2026. Source: EuroLeague
Rules for classification: Regular season tiebreakers

==== Results summary ====
Overall						Home					Away				
Pld	W	L	PF	PA	PD	W	L	PF	PA	PD	W	L	PF	PA	PD
13	6	7	1127	1123	+4	5	2	659	600	+59	1	5	468	523	−55

Last updated: 20 November 2026.
Source: EuroLeague

==== Results by round ====
Round	1	2	3	4	5	6	7	8	9	10	11	12	13	14	15	16	17	18	19	20	21	22	23	24	25	26	27	28	29	30	31	32	33	34	35	36	37	38
Ground	A	H	A	A	H	A	H	A	H	H	H	A	H	A	H	A	A	H	A	H	H	A	A	H	A	H	H	A	A	A	H	A	H	H	H	A	A	H
Result	L	W	L	L	L	W	W	L	W	L	W	L	W																									
Position	15	9	11	15	17	13	13	14	14	12	12	14	13																									

Updated to match(es) played on 20 November 2026. Source: EuroLeague.net
A = Away; H = Home; W = Win; L = Loss

==== Matches ====
Note: All times, from 25 October 2026 to 28 March 2027, are CET (UTC+1); up to 25 October 2026 and from 28 March 2027, are CEST (UTC+2) as listed by EuroLeague.

24 September 2026 1	FC Barcelona (Spanish Basketball Federation)	89–82	(Turkey) Anadolu Efes	Barcelona
20:30	Scoring by quarter: 16–25, 29–19, 18–23, 26–15
	Pts: Brizuela 20; Rebs: Gibson 6 Asts: Parra 3 PIR: Punter 22	Boxscore	Pts: James 22; Rebs: Jones, Šarić 5 Asts: James 5 PIR: Šarić 26	Arena: Palau Blaugrana; Attendance: 5,621; Referees: Saša Pukl, Maxime Boubert, Ioannis Tiganis

29 September 2026 2	Anadolu Efes (Turkey)	94–84	(Spain) Real Madrid	Istanbul
20:00	Scoring by quarter: 27–29, 26–12, 19–24, 22–19
	Pts: Dozier 18; Rebs: Fernando, Loyd 4 Asts: three players 4 PIR: Dozier 18	Boxscore	Pts: Campazzo 16; Rebs: Tavares 7 Asts: Feliz, Maledon 5 PIR: Campazzo 16	Arena: Basketball Development Center; Attendance: 8,087; Referees: Milan Nedović, Saulius Račys, Vasiliki Tsaroucha

1 October 2026 3	Crvena zvezda Meridianbet (Serbia)	77–72	(Turkey) Anadolu Efes	Belgrade
21:00	Scoring by quarter: 19–21, 18–15, 19–17, 21–19
	Pts: Moneke 18; Rebs: Dobrić, Moneke 7 Asts: Jones 4 PIR: Moneke 17	Boxscore	Pts: Šarić, Strazel 13; Rebs: Šarić 10; Asts: Malcolm 4 PIR: Loyd 28	Arena: Belgrade Arena; Attendance: 14,081; Referees: Gytis Vilius, Steve Bittner, Sergio Manuel

9 October 2026 4	Olympiacos Piraeus (Greece)	89–66	(Turkey) Anadolu Efes	Ano Liosia
21:15	Scoring by quarter: 26–16, 9–15, 27–18, 27–17
	Pts: Montero 16; Rebs: Milutinov 9 Asts: Fournier 6 PIR: Montero 21	Boxscore	Pts: Payne 12; Rebs: Šarić, Yusta 4 Asts: Russell 4 PIR: Loyd 14	Arena: SUNEL Arena; Attendance: 5,935; Referees: Robert Lottermoser, Michele Rossi, Gentian Cici

14 October 2026 5	Anadolu Efes (Turkey)	93–101	(Germany) Bayern Munich	Istanbul
20:30	Scoring by quarter: 22–26, 24–28, 22–21, 25–26
	Pts: Šarić 21; Rebs: Fernando 12; Asts: Strazel 7 PIR: Šarić 28	Boxscore	Pts: Washington 21; Rebs: Norris 6 Asts: Obst 6 PIR: Obst 20	Arena: Basketball Development Center; Attendance: 3,603; Referees: Oļegs Latiševs, Artūras Šukys, Luka Kardum

16 October 2026 6	Žalgiris (Lithuania)	70–85	(Turkey) Anadolu Efes	Kaunas
20:00	Scoring by quarter: 12–21, 24–21, 20–25, 14–18
	Pts: Edwards 16; Rebs: Valančiūnas 7 Asts: Lee 5 PIR: Valančiūnas 15	Boxscore	Pts: Strazel 19; Rebs: Šarić 10; Asts: Loyd 6 PIR: Strazel 22	Arena: Žalgirio Arena; Attendance: 15,133; Referees: Damir Javor, Thomas Bissuel, Steve Bittner

22 October 2026 7	Anadolu Efes (Turkey)	89–80	(Turkey) Beşiktaş	Istanbul
20:30	Scoring by quarter: 29–17, 28–19, 11–24, 21–20
	Pts: Payne 22; Rebs: Loyd 8 Asts: Strazel 6 PIR: Payne 19	Boxscore	Pts: Omoruyi 16; Rebs: Omoruyi 6 Asts: Wilbekin 5 PIR: Omoruyi 17	Arena: Basketball Development Center; Attendance: 4,325; Referees: Mehdi Difallah, Tomislav Hordov, Milivoje Jovčić

28 October 2026 8	Hapoel Tel Aviv (Israel)	118–88	(Turkey) Anadolu Efes	Botevgrad (Note: During the 2026–27 EuroLeague season, both Hapoel IBI Tel Aviv and Maccabi Playtika Tel Aviv are playing their home games outside of Israel due to the ongoing Gaza war. Maccabi Rapyd Tel Aviv host their games at Aleksandar Nikolić Hall in Belgrade, Serbia, while Hapoel IBI Tel Aviv play at Arena 8888 in Sofia, Bulgaria, with selected games moved to Arena Botevgrad when Arena 8888 is unavailable, until further notice.)
21:00	Scoring by quarter: 27–21, 36–20, 27–18, 28–29
	Pts: Blakeney 35; Rebs: Caboclo, Satoranský 7 Asts: Bryant 12; PIR: Blakeney, Bryant 35	Boxscore	Pts: Loyd 19; Rebs: Fernando, Malcolm 6 Asts: Strazel 5 PIR: Loyd 18	Arena: Arena Botevgrad; Attendance: 312; Referees: Ilija Belošević, Ioannis Foufis, Steve Bittner

30 October 2026 9	Anadolu Efes (Turkey)	83–68	(Greece) Panathinaikos Athens	Istanbul
20:30	Scoring by quarter: 21–18, 24–19, 16–14, 22–17
	Pts: Fernando, Malcolm 15; Rebs: Šarić 12; Asts: Payne 8 PIR: Malcolm 21	Boxscore	Pts: Nunn 17; Rebs: Lessort 11; Asts: Grant 5 PIR: Hayes-Davis 14	Arena: Basketball Development Center; Attendance: 9,923; Referees: Milan Nedovic, Saulius Racys, Eduard Udyanskyy

5 November 2026 10	Anadolu Efes (Turkey)	95–90	(France) Paris Basketball	Istanbul
20:30	Scoring by quarter: 26–23, 10–19, 34–24, 20–29
	Pts: Payne 33; Rebs: Fernando 10; Asts: Payne 7 PIR: Payne 29	Boxscore	Pts: Hifi 28; Rebs: Dokossi 9 Asts: Hifi 9 PIR: Hifi 39	Arena: Basketball Development Center; Attendance: 4,342; Referees: Robert Lottermoser, Oļegs Latiševs, Jordi Aliaga

13 November 2026 11	Anadolu Efes (Turkey)	103–91	(Italy) Virtus Bologna	Istanbul
20:30	Scoring by quarter: 28–20, 32–23, 16–25, 27–23
	Pts: Loyd 22; Rebs: Fernando 10; Asts: Payne, Strazel 8 PIR: Loyd 28	Boxscore	Pts: Alston 15; Rebs: Diarra, Edwards 6 Asts: Frazier 10; PIR: Diouf 16	Arena: Basketball Development Center; Attendance: 3,855; Referees: Tomislav Hordov, Artūras Šukys, Hugues Thepenier

17 November 2026 12	Dubai Basketball (United Arab Emirates)	80–75	(Turkey) Anadolu Efes	Dubai
19:00	Scoring by quarter: 15–23, 27–17, 17–15, 21–20
	Pts: Kabengele 18; Rebs: Kabengele 18; Asts: Musa 7 PIR: Musa 27	Boxscore	Pts: Strazel 20; Rebs: Dozier 7 Asts: Payne 6 PIR: Strazel 20	Arena: Coca-Cola Arena; Attendance: 5,470; Referees: Gytis Vilius, Michele Rossi, Sergio Manuel

20 November 2026 13	Anadolu Efes (Turkey)	107–81	(France) ASVEL Villeurbanne	Istanbul
20:30	Scoring by quarter: 25–17, 29–24, 31–25, 22–15
	Pts: Loyd, Strazel 20; Rebs: Jones, Šarić 7 Asts: Payne 8 PIR: Strazel 25	Boxscore	Pts: Fodzo Dada, Sestina 25; Rebs: Gach 5 Asts: Fodzo Dada 5 PIR: Fodzo Dada 17	Arena: Basketball Development Center; Attendance: 5,423; Referees: Robert Lottermoser, Damir Javor, Mario Majkić

25 November 2026 14	Baskonia (Spain)	vs.	(Turkey) Anadolu Efes	Vitoria-Gasteiz
22:30
		Boxscore		Arena: Fernando Buesa Arena

3 December 2026 15	Anadolu Efes (Turkey)	vs.	(Spain) Valencia Basket	Istanbul
20:30
		Boxscore		Arena: Basketball Development Center

10 December 2026 16	Fenerbahçe (Turkey)	vs.	(Turkey) Anadolu Efes	Istanbul
20:45
		Boxscore		Arena: Ülker Sports and Event Hall

16 December 2026 17	Partizan (Serbia)	vs.	(Turkey) Anadolu Efes	Belgrade
22:45
		Boxscore		Arena: Belgrade Arena

18 December 2026 18	Anadolu Efes (Turkey)	vs.	(Italy) Armani Olimpia Milan	Istanbul
20:30
		Boxscore		Arena: Basketball Development Center

23 December 2026 19	Maccabi Tel Aviv (Israel)	vs.	(Turkey) Anadolu Efes	Belgrade
22:05
		Boxscore		Arena: Aleksandar Nikolić Hall

30 December 2026 20	Anadolu Efes (Turkey)	vs.	(Spain) FC Barcelona	Istanbul
20:30
		Boxscore		Arena: Basketball Development Center

7 January 2027 21	Anadolu Efes (Turkey)	vs.	(Turkey) Fenerbahçe	Istanbul
20:30
		Boxscore		Arena: Basketball Development Center

January 12, 2027 22	Virtus Bologna (Italy)	vs.	(Turkey) Anadolu Efes	Bologna
22.30
		Boxscore		Arena: Unipol Hall

January 14, 2027 23	Real Madrid (Spain)	vs.	(Turkey) Anadolu Efes	Madrid
22.45
		Boxscore		Arena: WiZink Center

January 22, 2027 24	Anadolu Efes (Turkey)	vs.	(United Arab Emirates) Dubai Basketball	Istanbul
20.30
		Boxscore		Arena: Basketball Development Center

January 29, 2027 25	Panathinaikos Athens (Greece)	vs.	(Turkey) Anadolu Efes	Marousi
22.15
		Boxscore		Arena: Telekom Center Athens

February 2, 2027 26	Anadolu Efes (Turkey)	vs.	(Lithuania) Žalgiris	Istanbul
20.30
		Boxscore		Arena: Basketball Development Center

February 4, 2027 27	Anadolu Efes (Turkey)	vs.	(Israel) Maccabi Tel Aviv	TBC
20.30
		Boxscore		Arena: TBC

February 10, 2027 28	ASVEL Villeurbanne (France)	vs.	(Turkey) Anadolu Efes	Décines-Charpieu
22.00
		Boxscore		Arena: LDLC Arena

March 5, 2027 29	Armani Olimpia Milan (Italy)	vs.	(Turkey) Anadolu Efes	Assago
22.30
		Boxscore		Arena: Unipol Forum

March 9, 2027 30	Bayern Munich (Germany)	vs.	(Turkey) Anadolu Efes	Munich
22.30
		Boxscore		Arena: SAP Garden

March 11, 2027 31	Anadolu Efes (Turkey)	vs.	(Serbia) Partizan	Istanbul
20.30
		Boxscore		Arena: Basketball Development Center

March 19, 2027 32	Beşiktaş (Turkey)	vs.	(Turkey) Anadolu Efes	Istanbul
20.00
		Boxscore		Arena: Basketball Development Center

March 23, 2027 33	Anadolu Efes (Turkey)	vs.	(Serbia) Crvena zvezda Meridianbet	Istanbul
20.30
		Boxscore		Arena: Basketball Development Center

March 25, 2027 34	Anadolu Efes (Turkey)	vs.	(Spain) Baskonia	Istanbul
20.30
		Boxscore		Arena: Basketball Development Center

March 31, 2027 35	Anadolu Efes (Turkey)	vs.	(Greece) Olympiacos Piraeus	Istanbul
20.30
		Boxscore		Arena: Basketball Development Center

April 6, 2027 36	Paris Basketball (France)	vs.	(Turkey) Anadolu Efes	Paris
21.45
		Boxscore		Arena: Adidas Arena

April 8, 2027 37	Valencia Basket (Spain)	vs.	(Turkey) Anadolu Efes	Badalona
21.30
		Boxscore		Arena: Pavelló Olímpic

April 15, 2027 38	Anadolu Efes (Turkey)	vs.	(Israel) Hapoel Tel Aviv	TBC
20.30
		Boxscore		Arena: TBC
