= Matthew Strazel =

French basketball player

- Strazel with Anadolu Efes in 2026

No. 32 – Anadolu Efes
- Position: Point guard / shooting guard
- League: BSL; EuroLeague

Personal information
- Born: 5 August 2002 (age 24) Bourg-la-Reine, France
- Listed height: 1.82 m (6 ft 0 in)
- Listed weight: 81 kg (179 lb)

Career information
- Playing career: 2017–present

Career history
- 2019–2022: ASVEL
- 2022–2026: AS Monaco
- 2026–present: Anadolu Efes

Career highlights
- 5× French League champion (2021–2024, 2026); 3× French Cup winner (2021, 2023, 2026); French League Cup winner (2026); French Supercup winner (2025); French Cup Final MVP (2026); VTB United League Supercup winner (2026)
Medals
Men's basketball
Representing France
Olympic Games
Silver medal – second place	2024 Paris	Team
FIBA Under-19 World Cup
Silver medal – second place	2021 Latvia	Team

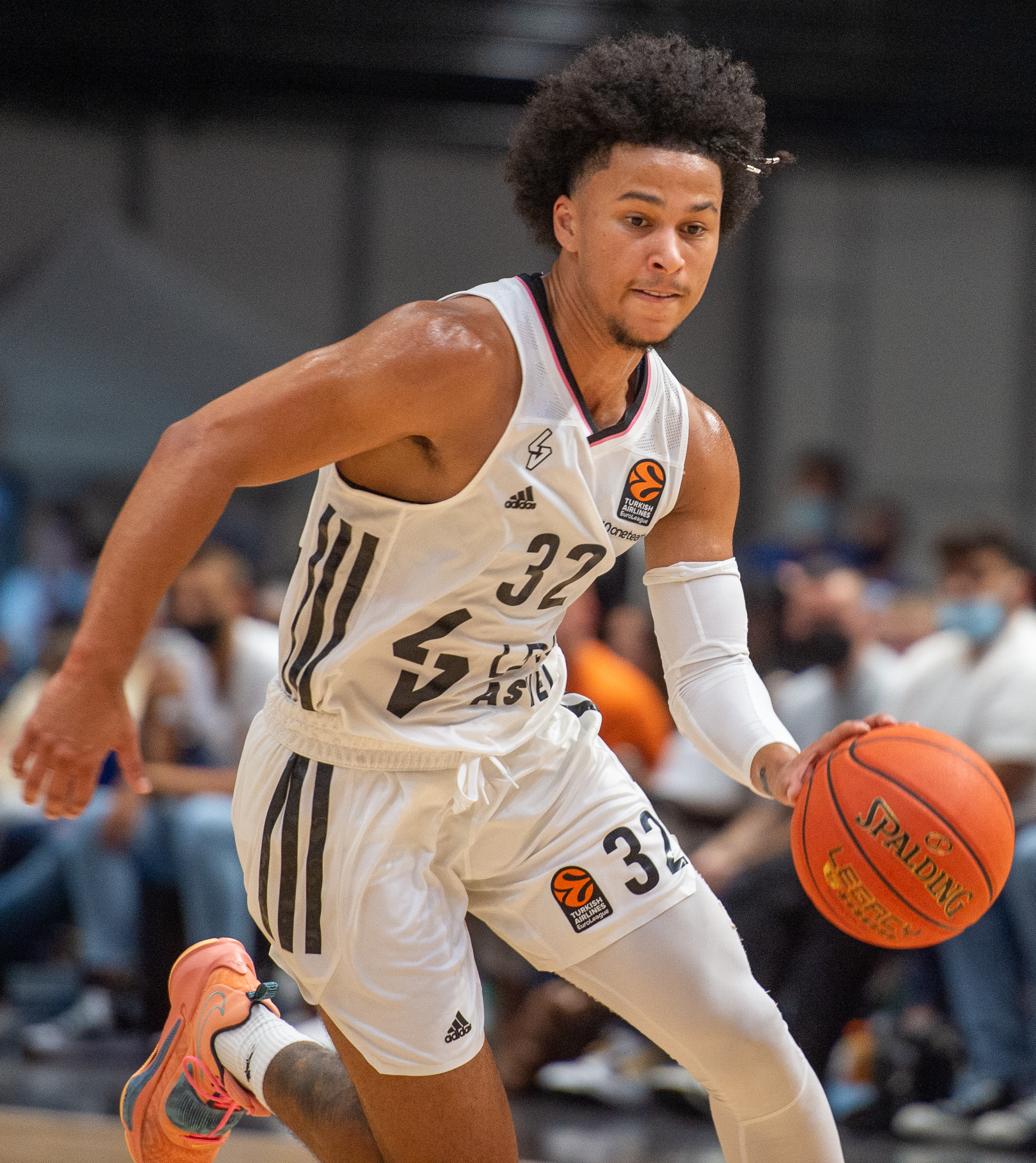
Strazel with ASVEL in 2021

Matthew Nelson Strazel (born 5 August 2002) is a French professional basketball player for Anadolu Efes of the Turkish Basketbol Süper Ligi (BSL) and the EuroLeague. He also represents the French national team in international competition, having appeared at the 2024 Olympics.

== Early life and youth career ==
Strazel was born in Bourg-la-Reine, in the southern suburbs of Paris, into a family with roots in the French overseas department of Guadeloupe. He signed a contract to join the youth sections of ASVEL after starting his career with its partner club, Marne-la-Vallée. In the 2017–18 season, he split time between the club's under-18 team and with Espoirs Lyon in LNB Espoirs, the French under-21 league, where he came off the bench. In 2018–19, he became a regular Espoirs player, averaging 14.5 points, 4.7 assists and 3.8 rebounds per game. On 6 May 2019, Strazel scored 44 points for the U18 ASVEL in a 110–100 loss to U18 JL Bourg during the semifinals of the French U18 Championship.

== Professional career ==
=== ASVEL (2019–2022) ===
On 31 July 2019, when he was 16 years old, Strazel signed his first professional contract with ASVEL. He made his senior debut on 6 October, playing five minutes in an 85–76 win over Cholet.

On 29 October, Strazel made his EuroLeague debut, scoring nine points with three three-pointers in 13 minutes to help defeat Baskonia, 66–63. On 10 March 2020, he scored a season-high 17 points in a 95–83 victory over Monaco. On 10 June 2020, Strazel signed a contract extension with the team until 2025,

=== AS Monaco (2022–2026) ===
On June 21, 2022, he signed a three-year deal with AS Monaco.

=== Anadolu Efes (2026–present) ===
On June 25, 2026, following financial challenges at Monaco, Strazel transferred to Anadolu Efes of the Turkish Basketbol Süper Ligi (BSL).

== National team career ==
Strazel was part of the France national team in the 2024 Olympics. He hit a crucial four-point play in the final minutes of the group stage game against Japan, which brought the game to overtime in which France managed to win.

== Career statistics ==
Legend
GP	Games played	GS	Games started	MPG	Minutes per game
FG%	Field-goal percentage	3P%	3-point field-goal percentage	FT%	Free-throw percentage
RPG	Rebounds per game	APG	Assists per game	SPG	Steals per game
BPG	Blocks per game	PPG	Points per game	PIR	Performance index rating
**Bold**	Career high

=== EuroLeague ===
Year	Team	GP	GS	MPG	FG%	3P%	FT%	RPG	APG	SPG	BPG	PPG	PIR
2019–20	ASVEL	16	2	13.9	.396	**.414**	.769	.7	1.6	.2	—	4.0	2.3
2020–21	ASVEL	20	3	13.1	.355	.324	**.850**	**1.1**	1.4	.2	—	3.6	2.6
2021–22	ASVEL	**30**	1	**15.3**	.305	.327	.826	.7	**1.9**	.3	—	3.4	2.3
2022–23	Monaco	25	3	8.1	**.440**	.320	.667	.2	.6	.2	—	2.5	1.0
2023–24	Monaco	17	**11**	13.1	.387	.308	.792	.6	1.8	**.5**	—	**4.4**	**4.9**
Career		108	20	12.7	.364	.337	.789	.7	1.4	.3	—	3.5	2.5

=== Domestic leagues ===
Year	Team	League	GP	MPG	FG%	3P%	FT%	RPG	APG	SPG	BPG	PPG
2019–20	(France) ASVEL	LNB Élite	14	11.4	.324	.350	.882	.6	2.0	.6	—	3.1
2020–21	(France) ASVEL	LNB Élite	34	17.1	.404	.337	.836	.9	2.2	.4	.0	5.5
2021–22	(France) ASVEL	LNB Élite	37	17.1	.403	.373	.773	1.1	2.1	.4	.0	5.3
2022–23	(France) Monaco	LNB Élite	42	21.3	.402	.326	.771	1.8	3.2	.5	.0	7.4
2023–24	(France) Monaco	LNB Élite	42	24.3	.450	.367	.781	1.8	3.4	.7	.0	9.9
