= Rado Trifunović =

Slovene basketball coach

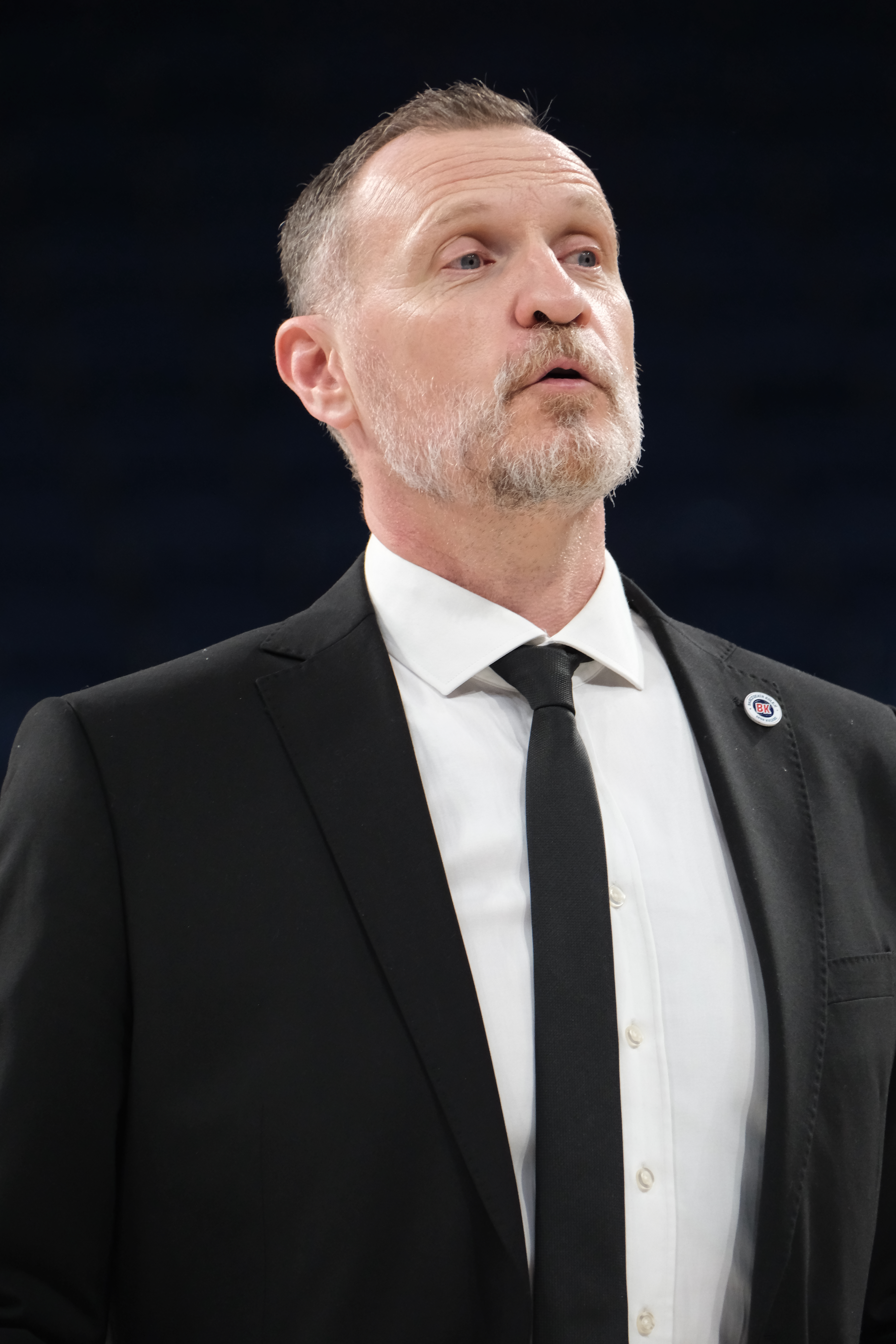
- Trifunović in 2025

Anadolu Efes
- Title: Assistant coach
- League: BSL; EuroLeague

Personal information
- Born: 25 January 1973 (age 53) Ljubljana, SR Slovenia, SFR Yugoslavia
- Listed height: 6 ft 8 in (2.03 m)

Career information
- College: Shaw (1996–1997)
- NBA draft: 1996: undrafted
- Playing career: 1993–2008
- Position: Forward
- Coaching career: 2008–present

Career history

Playing
- 1993–1996, 1997–1998: Helios Domžale
- 1998–1999: Hopsi Polzela
- 1999–2001: Helios Domžale
- 2001–2002: Leiria
- 2002–2003: Koper
- 2003–2004: Šentjur
- 2004–2007: Litija

Coaching
- 2008: Helios Domžale (assistant)
- 2008–2010, 2010–2011: Helios Domžale
- 2011: Zlatorog Laško
- 2015–2017: Slovenia (assistant)
- 2017–2020: Slovenia
- 2020–2024: Fenerbahçe (assistant)
- 2024–2025: Bahçeşehir Koleji (assistant)
- 2025–present: Anadolu Efes (assistant)
- 2025: Anadolu Efes (interim)

Career highlights
- As assistant coach: 2× Turkish League champion (2022, 2024); VTB United League Supercup winner (2026)
Medals
Men's basketball
Assistant coach for Slovenia
EuroBasket
Gold medal – first place	2017 Turkey

Radovan "Rado" Trifunović (Slovene pronunciation: [râdoʋaːn trifǔːnoʋitɕ]; born 25 January 1973) is a Slovenian professional basketball coach and former player. He is the current assistant coach for Anadolu Efes of the Turkish Basketbol Süper Ligi (BSL) and the EuroLeague.

== Coaching career ==
=== Slovenia (2017–2020) ===
On 10 October 2017, after Igor Kokoškov's contract expired, Trifunović was appointed the head coach of the Slovenian men's national team. Before he became Slovenia head coach, he has worked as an assistant coach under Kokoškov who led the team to the gold medal at the 2017 EuroBasket.

On 28 March 2020, Basketball Federation of Slovenia parted ways with Trifunović.
