= Tomislav Mijatović =

Croatian basketball coach

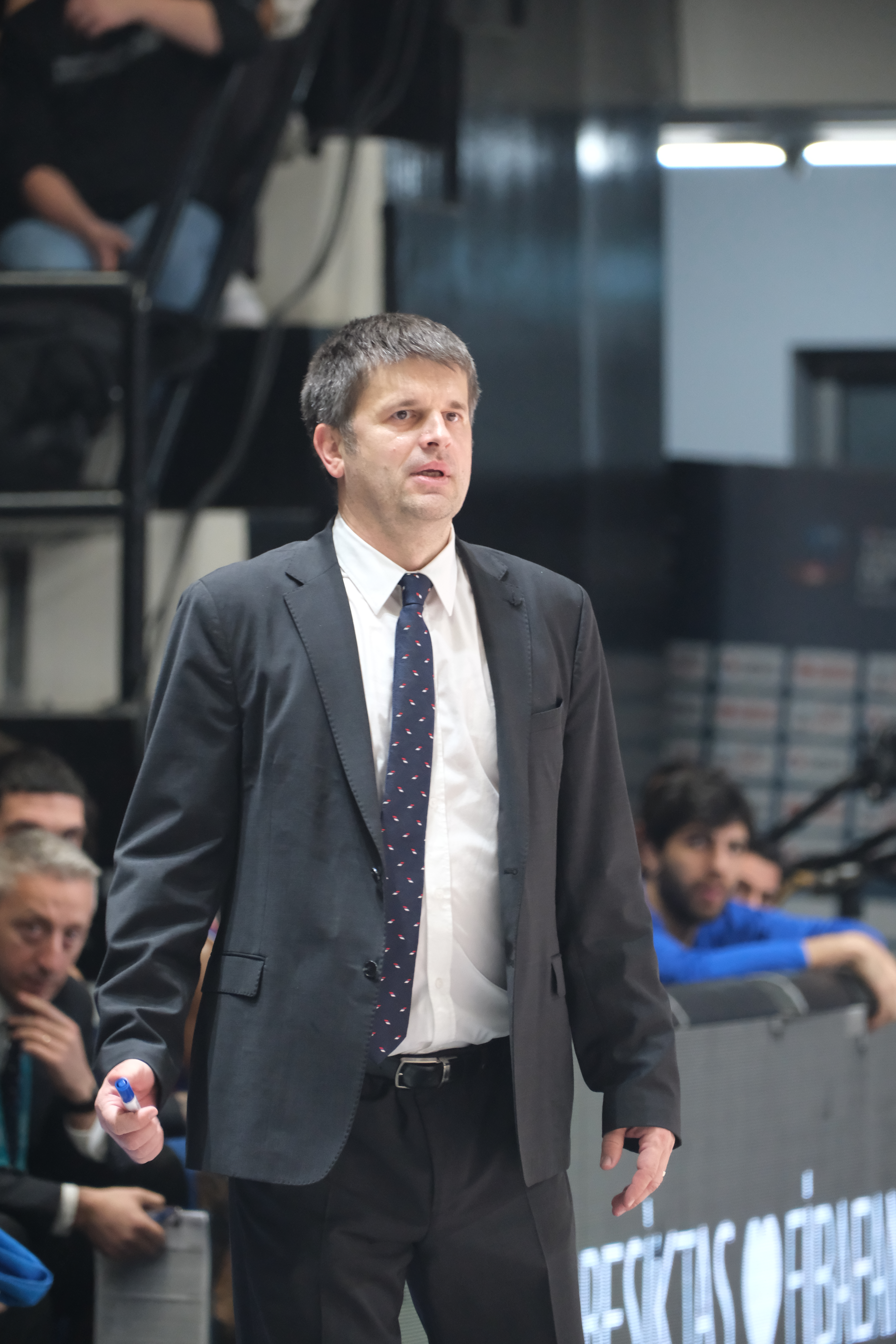
- Mijatović as head coach of Anadolu Efes in 2025

Anadolu Efes
- Position: Assistant coach
- League: Basketbol Süper Ligi; EuroLeague

Personal information
- Born: 29 February 1976 (age 50) Zagreb, SR Croatia, SFR Yugoslavia
- Coaching career: 2001–present

Career history
- 2001–2003: Cibona (assistant)
- 2003: Cibona (interim)
- 2007–2010: Cibona (assistant)
- 2010–2024: Anadolu Efes (assistant)
- 2024–2025: Anadolu Efes
- 2025–present: Anadolu Efes (assistant)
- 2025–present: Croatia

Career highlights
- As head coach: Turkish Supercup winner (2024); As assistant coach: 2× EuroLeague champion (2021, 2022); 3× Turkish League champion (2019, 2021, 2023); 3× Turkish Cup winner (2015, 2018, 2022); 5× Turkish Supercup winner (2010, 2015, 2018, 2019, 2022); VTB United League Supercup winner (2026); 3× Croatian League champion (2002, 2009, 2010); 2× Croatian Cup winner (2002, 2009)

Tomislav Mijatović (pronounced [tɔ̌mislaʋ mijǎːtɔʋitɕ]; born 29 February 1976) is a Croatian professional basketball coach. He is currently an assistant coach for Anadolu Efes of the Turkish Basketbol Süper Ligi and the EuroLeague, as well as the head coach of the Croatian national team.

== Coaching career ==
Mijatović was an assistant coach at Cibona Zagreb from 2001 to 2003. During the 2002–03 season, he temporarily replaced the suspended Aleksandar Petrović as head coach. In 2007, Mijatović again became assistant coach at Cibona. When Cibona's head coach Velimir Perasović moved to Anadolu Efes in Turkey in 2010, Mijatović was considered as his successor at Cibona. However, Mijatović followed Perasović to Anadolu Efes. As an assistant coach, Mijatović won the EuroLeague with the team in 2021 and 2022 and was also crowned Turkish champion and cup winner three times each. He worked in Istanbul under Ergin Ataman and Dušan Ivković, among others.

In February 2024, Mijatović was promoted to head coach of Anadolu Efes. In his first season as head coach, the club won the national league regular season, but fell short to Fenerbahçe in the finals. In January 2025, following the appointment of Luca Banchi as head coach, Mijatović returned to his previous role as an assistant coach.

On 20 May 2025, he was appointed head coach of the Croatia men’s national basketball team.

== Personal life ==
Mijatović’s mother, Darka, is from Novi Vinodolski, which he considers his second home and a source of “spiritual nourishment”. He spends his summers there with his wife, Marijana, and their son, Toma.

Mijatović and his family have lived in Istanbul for 14 years.
