= Anadolu Efes S.K. =

Basketball club in Istanbul

Anadolu Efes
- 2026–27 Anadolu Efes S.K. season
- Leagues: BSL; EuroLeague
- Founded: 1976; 50 years ago
- History: Efes Pilsen (1976–2011); Anadolu Efes (2011–present)
- Arena: Basketball Development Center
- Capacity: 10,000
- Location: Istanbul, Turkey
- Team colors: Navy, white, red, light blue
- Main sponsor: Efes Beverage Group
- President: Tuncay Özilhan
- Head coach: Pablo Laso
- Team captain: Erkan Yılmaz
- International titles: 2 EuroLeagues; 1 FIBA Korać Cup; 1 VTB United League Supercup
- Domestic titles: 16 Turkish Championships; 12 Turkish Cups; 14 Turkish Super Cups
- Retired numbers: 2 (7, 44)
- Website: anadoluefessk.org
Home	Away

Anadolu Efes Spor Kulübü, commonly referred to as Anadolu Efes or simply Efes, is a Turkish professional basketball team based in Istanbul. Founded in 1976, the club was formerly known as Efes Pilsen until 2011. Efes won the EuroLeague in 2021 and 2022, and was in first place of the European Club Ranking after the 2021 Final Four. Efes is also the most successful club in the history of the Turkish Super League (BSL), having won the league's championship 16 times. Efes has won a total of 42 domestic trophies, more than any other Turkish basketball club.

The home arena of Anadolu Efes S.K. is the Basketball Development Center in Istanbul, which has a seating capacity of 10,000 for basketball games. The club has its own practice facility in the district of Bahçelievler, which was built in 1982. The team competes in the Turkish Super League and in the EuroLeague. The team is owned by the Efes Beverage Group.

Anadolu Efes has developed a fierce rivalry with Fenerbahçe in recent years. The two clubs often meet in playoff series and cup finals.

== History ==
The club was established in 1976 as Efes Pilsen S.K., by taking over the Turkish second-division club Kadıköyspor, which had failed due to financial problems. Its initial sponsor was its former longtime namesake, Efes Pilsen, a subsidiary of the Anadolu Group. It won the 1978 Turkish second division national championship undefeated, earning promotion to the Turkish first division, where it has continuously competed ever since. In its first top-flight season (1978–79), Efes Pilsen S.K. won the Turkish national league title, immediately establishing itself as one of the country's top clubs.

After finishing 2nd in the 1992–93 FIBA European Cup, Efes Pilsen S.K. won the 1995–96 FIBA Korać Cup, which marked the first-ever European-wide title won by a Turkish club in any team sport. Efes Pilsen S.K. (later renamed Anadolu Efes S.K.) has also become a fixture in the European-wide top-tier level EuroLeague, making it to the competition's EuroLeague Final Four in 2000, and also to the FIBA SuproLeague's 2001 Final Four, and finishing 3rd on both occasions.

In 2011, the club changed its name to Anadolu Efes S.K., after the TAPDK (Tobacco and Alcohol Market Regulatory Authority) in Turkey prohibited the advertisement of tobacco and alcohol products in sports organizations.

In the 2017–18 season, Efes finished in the 16th and last place in the EuroLeague.

In the 2018–19 season, Efes had success in the EuroLeague as it managed to clinch the fourth-seed in the regular season. In the play-offs, the team beat FC Barcelona to advance to its first EuroLeague Final Four in 19 years. In the semi-final, Efes beat Fenerbahçe 92–73 to reach its first EuroLeague Final in history. In the championship game, Efes was defeated by CSKA Moscow, eventually finishing as the runner-up. In the same season, Efes won its first BSL championship since 2009. In Game 7 of the Finals against Fenerbahçe, Efes won 89–74 after Shane Larkin scored 38 points. Larkin was later named BSL Finals MVP.

In the 2020–21 and 2021–22 seasons Anadolu Efes won back-to-back EuroLeague Championships. But later in the following 2022–23 EuroLeague season they had ended 11th place in the season and out of the playoff bound.

== Home arenas ==
- Abdi İpekçi Arena: 1986–2010, 2012–2017
- Sinan Erdem Dome: 2010–2012, 2017–2024
- Basketball Development Centre: 2024–present
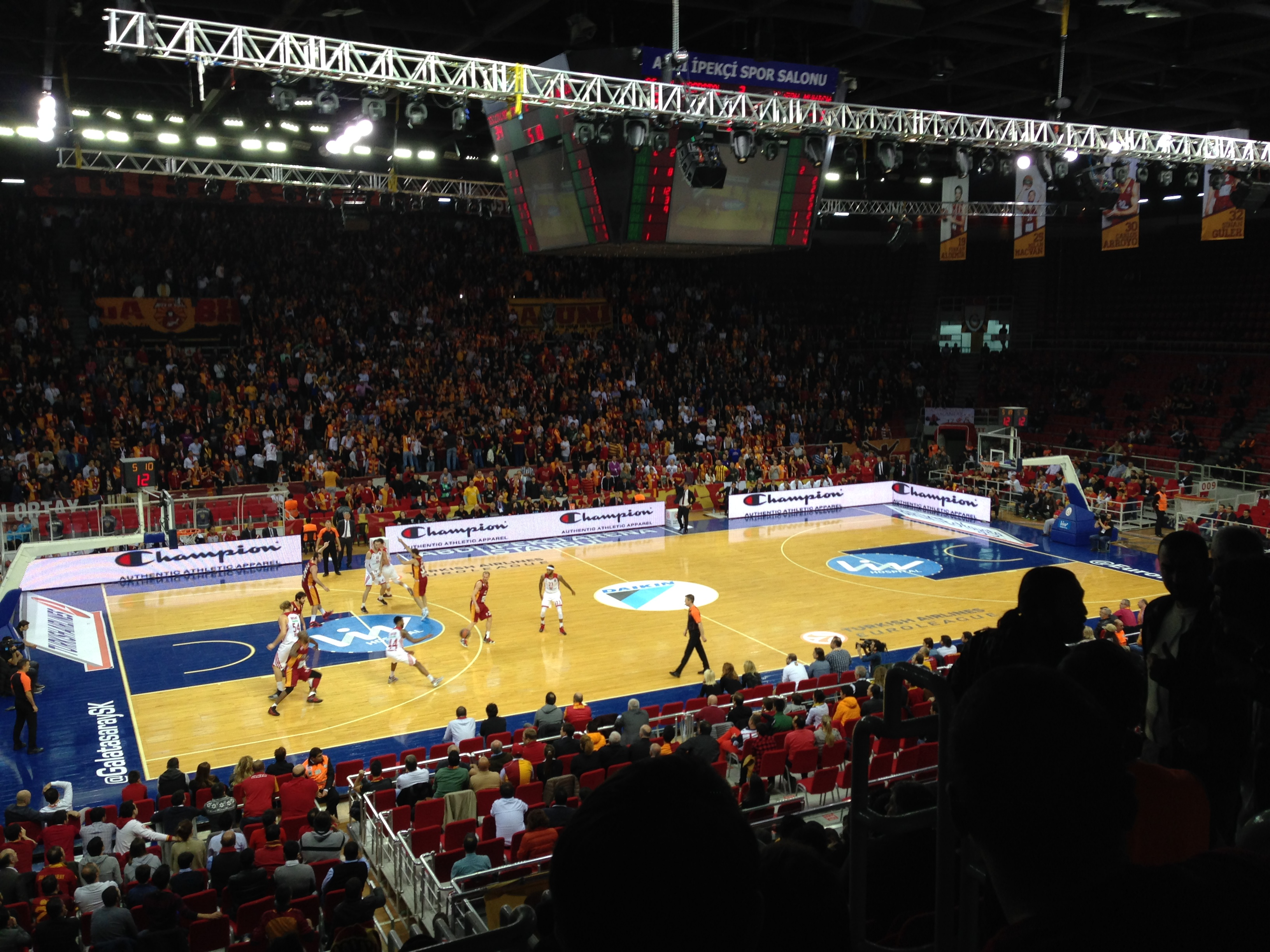
Abdi Ipekçi Arena interior during a match

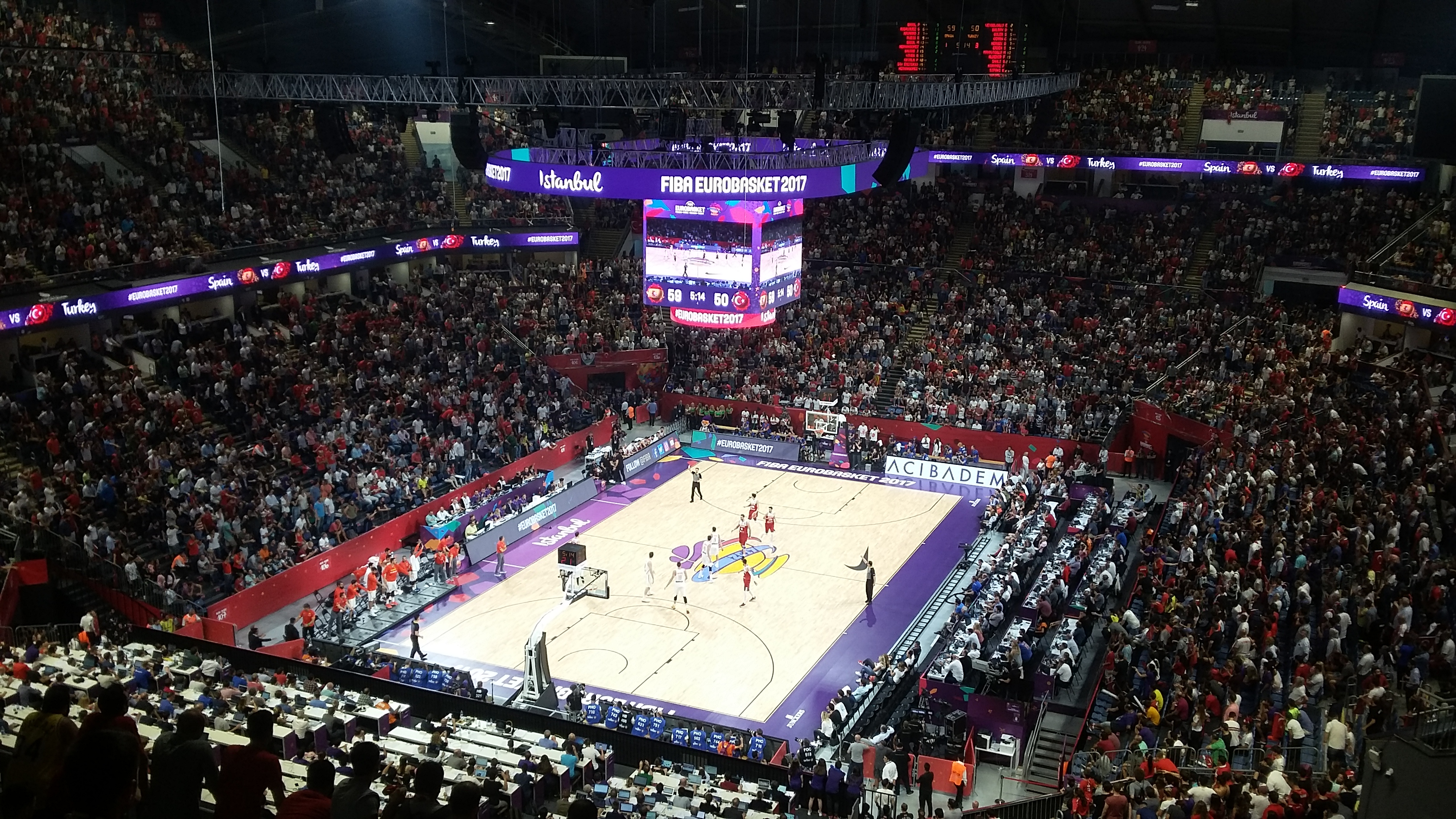
Sinan Erdem Dome

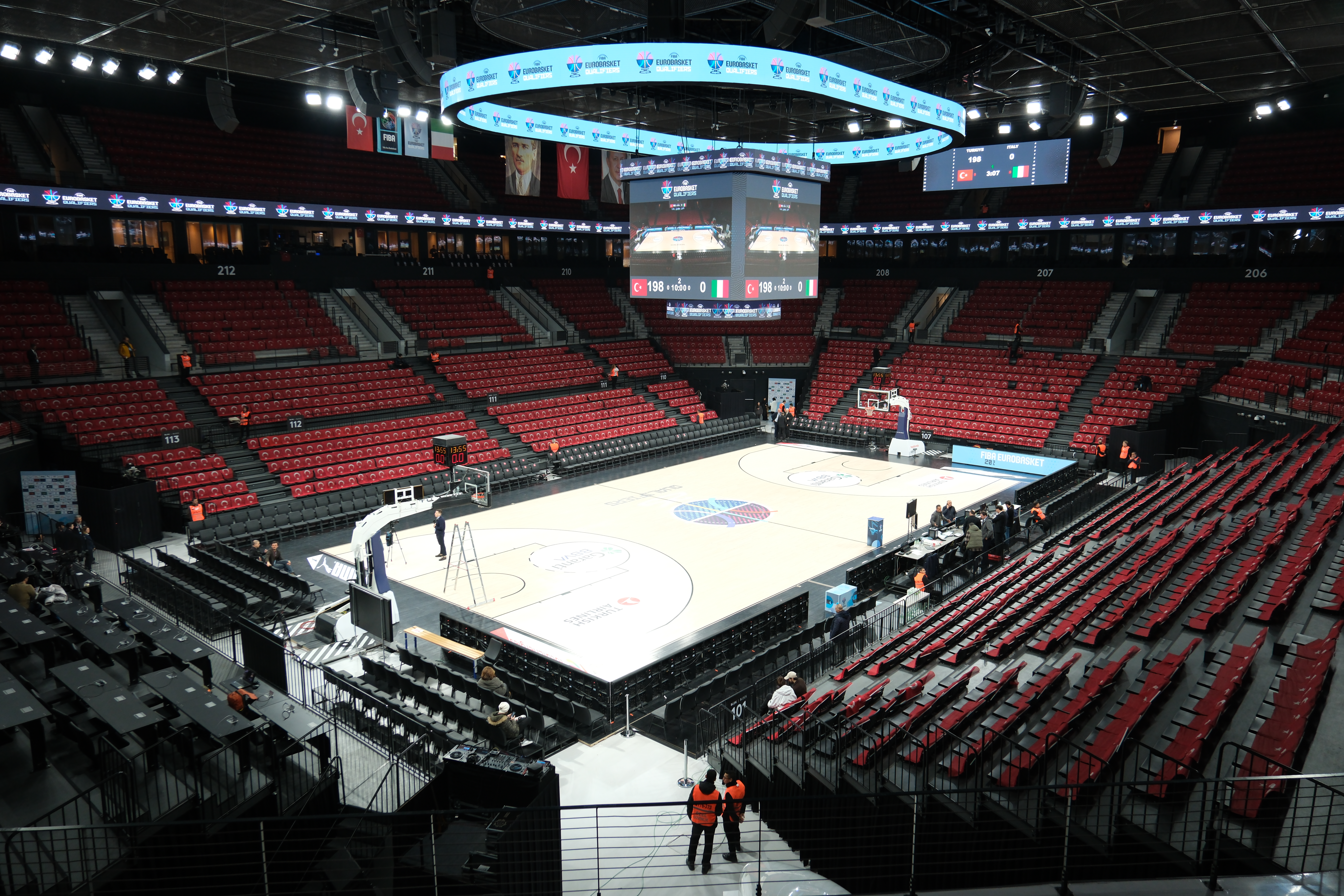
Basketball Development Centre

For many years, Efes has used the Abdi İpekçi Arena, with a seating capacity of 12,270, to host its home games. From 2017 to 2024, Efes used the 16,000 seat Sinan Erdem Dome for its home games.

Since 2024, Efes uses the newly opened arena Basketball Development Centre.

== Players ==
=== Current roster ===
Note: Flags indicate national team eligibility at FIBA-sanctioned events. Players may hold other non-FIBA nationalities not displayed.

Anadolu Efes roster
Players
Coaches

Pos.	No.	Nat.	Name	Ht.	Wt.	Age
F	2	(Turkey)	Karutasu, Darius	2.13 m (7 ft 0 in)	96 kg (212 lb)	17 – 30 March 2009
G	3	(Poland)	Loyd, Jordan	1.93 m (6 ft 4 in)	95 kg (209 lb)	33 – 27 July 1993
F	4	(Spain)	Yusta, Santiago	2.00 m (6 ft 7 in)	83 kg (183 lb)	29 – 28 April 1997
PF	5	(Croatia)	Šarić, Dario	2.11 m (6 ft 11 in)	102 kg (225 lb)	32 – 8 April 1994
C	9	(Greece)	Papagiannis, Georgios	2.20 m (7 ft 3 in)	121 kg (267 lb)	29 – 3 July 1997
G/F	10	(France)	Cordinier, Isaïa (injured)	1.98 m (6 ft 6 in)	89 kg (196 lb)	29 – 28 November 1996
PG	11	(Romania)	Russell, Fatts	1.80 m (5 ft 11 in)	75 kg (165 lb)	28 – 6 May 1998
G/F	15	(United States)	Dozier, PJ	2.00 m (6 ft 7 in)	93 kg (205 lb)	30 – 25 October 1996
PG	16	(Turkey)	Fenemen, Rüzgar	1.86 m (6 ft 1 in)	75 kg (165 lb)	18 – 3 April 2008
G/F	17	(United States)	Malcolm, Collin	2.00 m (6 ft 7 in)	91 kg (201 lb)	29 – 2 July 1997
F/C	19	(Turkey)	Yıldızlı, Burak Can	2.02 m (6 ft 8 in)	82 kg (181 lb)	32 – 22 April 1994
C	20	(Angola)	Fernando, Bruno	2.09 m (6 ft 10 in)	109 kg (240 lb)	28 – 15 August 1998
PG	22	(United States)	Payne, Cameron	1.89 m (6 ft 2 in)	83 kg (183 lb)	32 – 8 August 1994
SG	23	(Turkey)	Mutaf, Sarper David	1.97 m (6 ft 6 in)	85 kg (187 lb)	24 – 14 June 2002
F/C	24	(Turkey)	Osmani, Ercan	2.13 m (7 ft 0 in)	102 kg (225 lb)	28 – 4 August 1998
PG	32	(France)	Strazel, Matthew	1.84 m (6 ft 0 in)	81 kg (179 lb)	24 – 5 August 2002
SF	33	(Turkey)	Yılmaz, Erkan (C)	1.95 m (6 ft 5 in)	87 kg (192 lb)	28 – 3 December 1997
PG	55	(United States)	James, Mike (injured)	1.83 m (6 ft 0 in)	89 kg (196 lb)	36 – 18 August 1990
F/C	88	(The Bahamas)	Jones, Kai	2.12 m (6 ft 11 in)	100 kg (220 lb)	25 – 19 January 2001

Head coach

- (Spain) Pablo Laso

Assistant coach(es)

- (Slovenia) Rado Trifunović
- (Croatia) Tomislav Mijatović
- (Turkey) Cenk Akyol

Legend

- (C) Team captain
- Injured

- Roster
Updated: October 8, 2026

=== EuroLeague Depth chart ===
Pos.	Starting 5	Bench 1	Bench 2	Bench 3	Inactive
C	Bruno Fernando	Kai Jones	Georgios Papagiannis
PF	Dario Šarić	Ercan Osmani			Burak Can Yıldızlı
SF	Collin Malcolm	Santiago Yusta	Erkan Yılmaz	Darius Karutasu	Isaïa Cordinier (injured)
SG	Jordan Loyd	PJ Dozier	Sarper David Mutaf
PG	Cameron Payne	Matthew Strazel	Fatts Russell	Rüzgar Fenemen	Mike James (injured)

=== BSL Depth chart ===
Pos.	Starting 5	Bench 1	Bench 2	Bench 3	Inactive
C	Bruno Fernando*	Kai Jones*	Georgios Papagiannis*
PF	Dario Šarić*	Burak Can Yıldızlı	Ercan Osmani	Santiago Yusta*
SF	Collin Malcolm*	Erkan Yılmaz	Darius Karutasu	PJ Dozier*	Isaïa Cordinier* (injured)
SG	Sarper David Mutaf	Jordan Loyd*		Cameron Payne*
PG	Matthew Strazel*	Fatts Russell*		Rüzgar Fenemen	Mike James* (injured)

- BSL requires a maximum of 7 registered foreign players per squad, with no more than 4 foreign players allowed on the court at any given time. Crucially, at least 1 Turkish player must remain on the floor during every second of game play. Foreign players are shown with an asterisk (*).

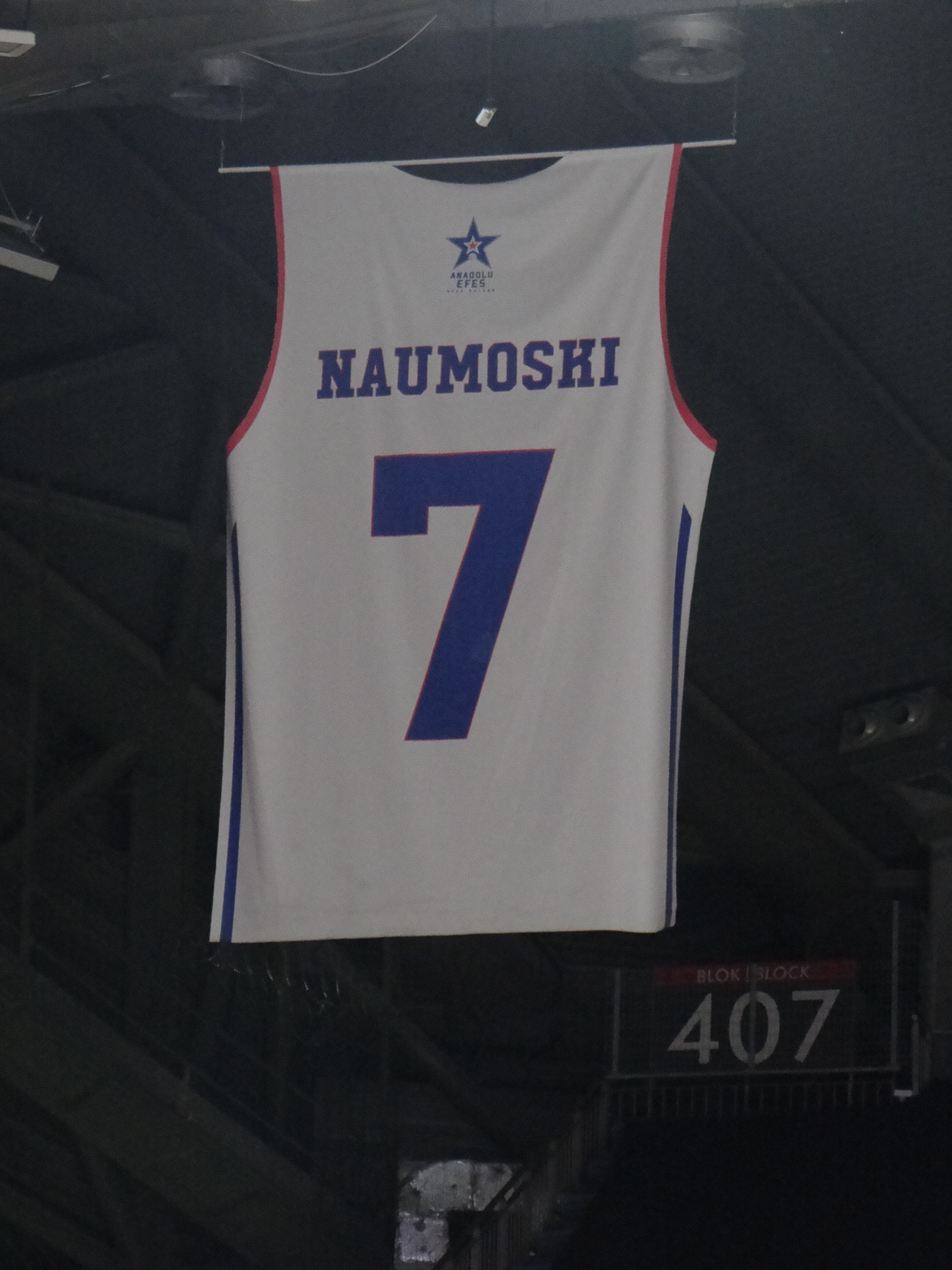
Naumoski's retired #7 Efes jersey.

=== Retired numbers ===
Anadolu Efes retired numbers
No	Nat.	Player	Position	Tenure	Ceremony date
7	(North Macedonia)	Petar Naumoski	PG	1992–1994, 1995–1999	9 February 2017
44	(Croatia)	Krunoslav Simon	SG / SF	2017–2022	1 December 2022

== Honours and other achievements ==
Honours
Type	Competition	Titles	Seasons
International	EuroLeague	2	2020–21, 2021–22
International	FIBA Korać Cup	1	1995–96
International	VTB League Supercup	1	2026
Domestic	Turkish Super League	16	1978–79, 1982–83, 1983–84, 1991–92, 1992–93, 1993–94, 1995–96, 1996–97, 2001–02, 2002–03, 2003–04, 2004–05, 2008–09, 2018–19, 2020–21, 2022–23
Domestic	Turkish Cup	12	1993–94, 1995–96, 1996–97, 1997–98, 2000–01, 2001–02, 2005–06, 2006–07, 2008–09, 2014–15, 2018, 2022
Domestic	Turkish Presidential Cup	14	1986, 1992, 1993, 1996, 1998, 2000, 2006, 2009, 2010, 2015, 2018, 2019, 2022, 2024

- Record title holders

=== Other Achievements ===
==== International competitions ====
- EuroLeague
  - Runners-up (1): 2018–19
  - 3rd place (2): 1999–00, 2000–01
  - Final Four (5): 2000, 2001, 2019, 2021, 2022
- FIBA Saporta Cup (defunct)
  - Runners-up (1): 1992–93

==== Domestic competitions ====
- Turkish Super League
  - Runners-up (13): 1985–86, 1997–98, 1998–99, 1999–00, 2000–01, 2005–06, 2006–07, 2009–10, 2011–12, 2014–15, 2015–16, 2021–22, 2023–24
- Turkish Cup
  - Runners-up (5): 2003–04, 2013–14, 2017, 2019, 2024
- Turkish Presidential Cup
  - Runners-up (11): 1994, 1997, 1999, 2001, 2002, 2003, 2004, 2005, 2007, 2012, 2016

==== Other competitions ====
- FIBA International Christmas Tournament (defunct)

3rd place (1): 1996

- Sondrio, Italy Invitational Game

Winners (1): 2008

- Bandirma Invitational Game

Winners (1): 2008

- Sarajevo Invitational Game

Winners (1): 2010

- Istanbul, Turkey Invitational Game

Winners (1): 2014

- Αachen, Germany Basketball Tournament

Winners (1): 1995

- Crete Heraklion Basketball Tournament

Winners (1): 2016

- TUBAD Basketball Tournament

Winners (1): 2018

- Zadar Basketball Tournament

Winners: 2019

- Instabul Basketball Tournament

Winners (1): 1995

- Gloria Cup

Winners (2): 2020, 2021

== Notable players ==
Note: Flags indicate national team eligibility at FIBA-sanctioned events. Players may hold other non-FIBA nationalities not displayed.

Criteria

To appear in this section a player must have either:

- Set a club record or won an individual award while at the club
- Played at least one official international match for their national team at any time
- Played at least one official NBA match at any time.

- (Turkey) Mustafa Abi
- (Turkey) Cenk Akyol
- (Turkey) Ender Arslan
- (Turkey) Volkan Aydın
- (Turkey) Birkan Batuk
- (Turkey) Hüseyin Beşok
- (Turkey) Erdal Bibo
- (Turkey) Onuralp Bitim
- (Turkey) Semih Erden
- (Turkey) Serkan Erdoğan
- (Turkey) Murat Evliyaoğlu
- (Turkey) Kerem Gönlüm
- (Turkey) Sinan Güler
- (Turkey) Ersan İlyasova
- (Turkey) Furkan Korkmaz
- (Turkey) İbrahim Kutluay
- (Turkey) Mehmet Okur
- (Turkey) Ömer Onan
- (Turkey) Cedi Osman
- (Turkey) Tamer Oyguç
- (Turkey) Kaya Peker
- (Turkey) Ufuk Sarıca
- (Turkey) Kerem Tunçeri
- (Turkey) Mirsad Türkcan
- (Turkey) Hedo Türkoğlu
- (Turkey) Alper Yılmaz
- (Albania) (Turkey) Ermal Kuqo
- (Armenia) (United States) Bryant Dunston
- (Australia) Brock Motum
- (Croatia) Stanko Barać
- (Croatia) Mario Kasun
- (Croatia) Damir Mulaomerović
- (Croatia) Zoran Planinić
- (Croatia) Marko Popović
- (Croatia) Nikola Prkačin
- (Croatia) Dario Šarić
- (Croatia) Krunoslav Simon
- (Croatia) Nikola Vujčić
- (Croatia) Ante Žižić
- (France) Thomas Heurtel
- (France) Adrien Moerman
- (Gabon) Stéphane Lasme
- (Greece) Michalis Kakiouzis
- (Greece) Stratos Perperoglou
- (Latvia) Kaspars Kambala
- (Lithuania) Saulius Štombergas
- (Montenegro) Predrag Drobnjak
- (North Macedonia) Petar Naumoski
- (Montenegro) Vlado Šćepanović
- (Montenegro) Milko Bjelica
- (Montenegro) Goran Nikolić
- (Montenegro) Slavko Vraneš
- (Puerto Rico) (United States) Daniel Santiago
- (Russia) Vasili Karasev
- (Serbia) Dušan Kecman
- (Serbia) Vasilije Micić
- (Serbia) Igor Rakočević
- (Serbia) Duško Savanović
- (Serbia) Zoran Savić
- (Serbia) Vladimir Štimac
- (Slovenia) Zoran Dragić
- (Slovenia) Jurica Golemac
- (Slovenia) Edo Murić
- (Slovenia) Boštjan Nachbar
- (Slovenia) Alen Omić
- (Slovenia) (Serbia) Sasha Vujačić
- (Uruguay) Esteban Batista
- (United States) Josh Adams
- (United States) Derrick Alston
- (United States) Derrick Brown
- (United States) Marcus Brown
- (United States) Elijah Bryant
- (United States) Will Clyburn
- (United States) Chris Corchiani
- (United States) Bryce Cotton
- (United States) Jon Diebler
- (United States) (Bosnia and Herzegovina) Henry Domercant
- (United States) (Kosovo) Justin Doellman
- (United States) Toney Douglas
- (United States) (Turkey) Erwin Dudley
- (United States) (Israel) Jordan Farmar
- (United States) Jamon Gordon
- (United States) Antonio Granger
- (Uruguay) Jayson Granger
- (United States) Kenny Green
- (United States) Kenny Gregory
- (United States) Marcus Haislip
- (United States) Tyler Honeycutt
- (United States) (Georgia (country)) Matt Janning
- (United States) Brian Howard
- (United States) Trajan Langdon
- (United States) Ricky Ledo
- (United States) Anthony Mason
- (United States) Errick McCollum
- (United States) Conrad McRae
- (United States) Drew Nicholas
- (United States) Daniel Oturu
- (United States) Scoonie Penn
- (United States) Mark Pope
- (United States) Larry Richard
- (United States) Scott Roth
- (United States) Willie Solomon
- (United States) Charles Smith
- (United States) (Turkey) Preston Shumpert
- (United States) Deshaun Thomas
- (United States) Bootsy Thornton
- (United States) (Israel) Alex Tyus
- (United States) Rickie Winslow
- (United States) Andrew Wisniewski
- (United States) Sonny Weems

=== Players at the NBA draft ===
^{+}	Denotes player who has been selected for at least one All-Star Game
^{#}	Denotes player who has never appeared in an NBA regular-season or playoff game

Position	Player	Year	Round	Pick	Drafted by
PF	(Turkey) Mirsad Türkcan	1998	1st round	18th	Houston Rockets
SF	(Turkey) Hedo Türkoğlu	2000	1st round	16th	Sacramento Kings
C/PF	(Turkey) Mehmet Okur^{+}	2001	2nd round	38th	Detroit Pistons
SG/SF	(Turkey) Cenk Akyol^{#}	2005	2nd round	59th	Atlanta Hawks
SF	(Turkey) Cedi Osman	2015	2nd round	31st	Minnesota Timberwolves
SG/SF	(Turkey) Furkan Korkmaz	2016	1st round	26th	Philadelphia 76ers

== Season by season ==
Season	Tier	Division	Pos.	Cup competitions	European Competitions	
1976–77	2	TB2L				
1977–78	2	TB2L	1st			
1978–79	1	TBL	1st			
1979–80	1	TBL	2nd		EuroLeague	
1980–81	1	TBL	3rd		Cup Winners' Cup	
1981–82	1	TBL	3rd		Korać Cup	
1982–83	1	TBL	1st		Korać Cup	
1983–84	1	TBL	1st		EuroLeague	
1984–85	1	TBL	5th		EuroLeague	
1985–86	1	TBL	2nd			
1986–87	1	TBL	3rd		Cup Winners' Cup	
1987–88	1	TBL	5th		Korać Cup	
1988–89	1	TBL	3rd		Korać Cup	
1989–90	1	TBL	4th		Korać Cup	QF
1990–91	1	TBL	5th		Korać Cup	
1991–92	1	TBL	1st		Played Korać Cup	
1992–93	1	TBL	1st		Saporta Cup	RU
1993–94	1	TBL	1st	Champion	EuroLeague	QF
1994–95	1	TBL	3rd		EuroLeague	
1995–96	1	TBL	1st	Champion	Korać Cup	C
1996–97	1	TBL	1st	Champion	EuroLeague	QF
1997–98	1	TBL	2nd	Champion	EuroLeague	QF
1998–99	1	TBL	2nd		EuroLeague	QF
1999–00	1	TBL	2nd	Semifinalist	EuroLeague	SF^{3rd}
2000–01	1	TBL	2nd	Champion	SuproLeague	SF^{3rd}
2001–02	1	TBL	1st	Champion	EuroLeague	T16
2002–03	1	TBL	1st	Semifinalist	EuroLeague	T16
2003–04	1	TBL	1st	Runner-up	EuroLeague	T16
2004–05	1	TBL	1st	Quarterfinalist	EuroLeague	QF
2005–06	1	TBL	2nd	Champion	EuroLeague	QF
2006–07	1	TBL	2nd	Champion	EuroLeague	T16
2007–08	1	TBL	4th	Semifinalist	EuroLeague	T16
2008–09	1	TBL	1st	Champion	EuroLeague	RS
2009–10	1	TBL	2nd	Semifinalist	EuroLeague	T16
2010–11	1	TBL	4th	Quarterfinalist	EuroLeague	T16
2011–12	1	TBL	2nd	Semifinalist	EuroLeague	T16
2012–13	1	TBL	3rd	Quarterfinalist	EuroLeague	QF
2013–14	1	TBL	5th	Runner-up	EuroLeague	T16
2014–15	1	TBL	2nd	Champion	EuroLeague	QF
2015–16	1	BSL	2nd	Quarterfinalist	EuroLeague	T16
2016–17	1	BSL	3rd	Runner-up	EuroLeague	QF
2017–18	1	BSL	3rd	Champion	EuroLeague	RS
2018–19	1	BSL	1st	Runner-up	EuroLeague	RU
2019–20	1	BSL	–^{1}	Quarterfinalist	EuroLeague	RS^{1}
2020–21	1	BSL	1st	– ^{1}	EuroLeague	C
2021–22	1	BSL	2nd	Champion	EuroLeague	C
2022–23	1	BSL	1st	–	EuroLeague	RS
2023–24	1	BSL	2nd	Runner-up	EuroLeague	PI
2024–25	1	BSL	3rd	Quarterfinalist	EuroLeague	PO
2025–26	1	BSL	4th	Semifinalist	EuroLeague	RS

^1 Cancelled due to the COVID-19 pandemic in Europe.

== International record ==
Season	Achievement	Notes
EuroLeague
1993–94	Quarter-finals	eliminated 2–1 by FC Barcelona, 50–54 (L) in Barcelona, 73–64 (W) and 62–76 (L) in Istanbul
1996–97	Quarter-finals	eliminated 2–1 by ASVEL, 81–71 (W) in Istanbul, 70–80 (L) in Villeurbanne and 57–62 (L) in Istanbul
1997–98	Quarter-finals	eliminated 2–1 by Benetton Treviso, 57–67 (L) in Treviso, 59–58 (W) in Istanbul and 68–76 (L) in Treviso
1998–99	Quarter-finals	eliminated 2–0 by Žalgiris, 68–69 (L) in Kaunas and 70–84 (L) in Istanbul
1999–00	Final four	3rd place in Thessaloniki, lost to Panathinaikos 71–81 in the semi-final, defeated FC Barcelona 75–69 in the 3rd place game
2000–01	Final four	3rd place in Paris, lost to Panathinaikos 66–74 in the semi-final, defeated CSKA Moscow 91–85 in the 3rd place game
2004–05	Quarter-finals	eliminated 2–1 by Panathinaikos, 96–102 (L) in Athens, 75–63 (W) in Istanbul and 76–84 (L) in Athens
2005–06	Quarter-finals	eliminated 2–0 by CSKA Moscow, 57–66 (L) in Moscow and 71–75 (L) in Istanbul
2012–13	Quarter-finals	eliminated 3–2 by Olympiacos, 62–67 (L) and 53-71 (L) in Piraeus, 83–72 (W) and 74–73 (W) in Istanbul, 72–82 (L) in Piraeus
2014–15	Quarter-finals	eliminated 3–1 by Real Madrid, 71–80 (L) and 85–90 (L) in Madrid, 75–72 (W) and 63–76 (L) in Istanbul
2016–17	Quarter-finals	eliminated 3–2 by Olympiacos, 87–72 (L) and 73–71 (W) in Piraeus, 64–60 (W) and 62–74 (L) in Istanbul, 78–87 (L) in Piraeus
2018–19	Final	lost to CSKA Moscow 83–91 in the Final (Vitoria-Gasteiz)
2020–21	Champions	defeated FC Barcelona 86–81 in the Final (Cologne)
2021–22	Champions	defeated Real Madrid 58–57 in the Final (Belgrade)
FIBA Saporta Cup
1980–81	Quarter-finals	4th place in a group with FC Barcelona, Turisanda Varese and Parker Leiden
1986–87	Quarter-finals	3rd place in a group with Cibona, Scavolini Pesaro and Maes Pils
1992–93	Final	lost to Sato Aris 48–50 in the Final (Turin)
FIBA Korać Cup
1989–90	Quarter-finals	eliminated by Bosna, 91–107 (L) in Istanbul and 78–117 (L) in Sarajevo
1995–96	Champions	defeated Stefanel Milano, 76–68 (W) in Istanbul and 70–77 (L) in Milan in the double finals of Korać Cup

=== Matches against NBA teams ===
In 2006, Efes Pilsen became the first Turkish basketball club to be invited to play with NBA teams. They competed against the Denver Nuggets in Denver, Colorado on October 11, and against the Golden State Warriors in Oakland, California on October 12. In 2007, Efes Pilsen hosted the Minnesota Timberwolves at the Abdi İpekçi Arena.

10 October 2006

Boxscore

Denver Nuggets (United States)	118–102	(Turkey) Efes Pilsen

(United States) Pepsi Center, Denver, CO

12 October 2006

Boxscore

Golden State Warriors (United States)	120–66	(Turkey) Efes Pilsen

(United States) Oracle Arena, Oakland, CA

6 October 2007

Boxscore

Minnesota Timberwolves (United States)	84–81	(Turkey) Efes Pilsen

(Turkey) Abdi İpekçi Arena, Istanbul

== Head coaches ==
- (Turkey) Rıza Erverdi (1983–1984)
- (Turkey) Aydan Siyavuş (1984–1986)
- (Serbia) Rusmir Halilovic (1986–1987)
- (Turkey) Aydan Siyavuş (1987–1990)
- (Turkey) Halil Üner (1990–1992)
- (Turkey) Aydın Örs (1992–1999)
- (Turkey) Ergin Ataman (1999–2001)
- (Turkey) Oktay Mahmuti (2001–2007)
- (United States) (Israel) David Blatt (2007–2008)
- (Turkey) Ekrem Memnun (2008)
- (Turkey) Ergin Ataman (2008–2010)
- (Croatia) Velimir Perasović (2010–2011)
- (Turkey) Ufuk Sarıca (2011–2012)
- (Greece) Ilias Zouros (2012)
- (Turkey) Oktay Mahmuti (2012–2013)
- (Greece) Vangelis Angelou (2013–2014)
- (Serbia) Dušan Ivković (2014–2016)
- (Turkey) Ahmet Çakı (2016)
- (Croatia) Velimir Perasović (2016–2017)
- (Turkey) Ergin Ataman (2017–2023)
- (Turkey) Erdem Can (2023–2024)
- (Croatia) Tomislav Mijatović (2024–2025)
- (Italy) Luca Banchi (2025)
- (Serbia) Igor Kokoškov (2025)
- (Spain) Pablo Laso (2025–present)
