= Collin Malcolm =

American basketball player, born 1997

- Malcolm with Anadolu Efes in 2026

No. 17 – Anadolu Efes
- Position: Shooting guard / small forward
- League: Basketbol Süper Ligi; EuroLeague

Personal information
- Born: July 2, 1997 (age 29) Ashland, Oregon, U.S.
- Listed height: 2.01 m (6 ft 7 in)
- Listed weight: 91 kg (201 lb)

Career information
- High school: Ashland (Ashland, Oregon)
- College: Warner Pacific (2015–2019)
- NBA draft: 2019: undrafted
- Playing career: 2019–present

Career history
- 2019–2020: Batumi
- 2020–2021: Kauhajoki Karhu
- 2021–2022: Keravnos
- 2022–2023: Telekom Baskets Bonn
- 2023–2025: Paris Basketball
- 2025–2026: Hapoel Tel Aviv
- 2026–present: Anadolu Efes

Career highlights
- EuroCup champion (2024); FIBA Champions League champion (2023); VTB United League Supercup winner (2026); LNB Élite champion (2025); French Cup winner (2025); French League Cup winner (2024); Cypriot League champion (2022); Cypriot Cup winner (2022); Cypriot League MVP (2022); Cypriot Cup top scorer (2022); Third-team NAIA All-American (2019); 3× First-team All-CCC (2017–2019)

Collin Malcolm (born 2 July 1997) is an American professional basketball player for Anadolu Efes of the Basketbol Süper Ligi (BSL) and the EuroLeague.

== Professional career ==
After graduating from college, Malcolm started his professional career with Batumi in Georgian Superliga in 2019.

=== Kauhajoki Karhu ===
On 24 June 2020, he moved to Finland and signed with Kauhajoki Karhu Basket in Korisliiga for the 2020–21 season. On 6 May 2021, the club exercised their option to extend Malcolm's contract for the next season. At the end of the 2020–21 season, the team finished second in the domestic league.

=== Keravnos ===
On 22 July 2021, it was announced that Malcolm would move to Keravnos in Cyprus. Keravnos paid Karhu a fee for his contract. With Keravnos, Malcolm won the Cypriot League and the Cypriot Basketball Cup in 2022.

=== Telekom Baskets Bonn ===
For the 2022–23 season, Malcolm joined Telekom Baskets Bonn in the German Basketball Bundesliga and the Basketball Champions League, coached by Tuomas Iisalo. The team went on to win the Champions League title, after beating Hapoel Jerusalem in the final of the Final Four. They also advanced to the Bundesliga finals, where they eventually fell short to Ulm.

=== Paris Basketball ===
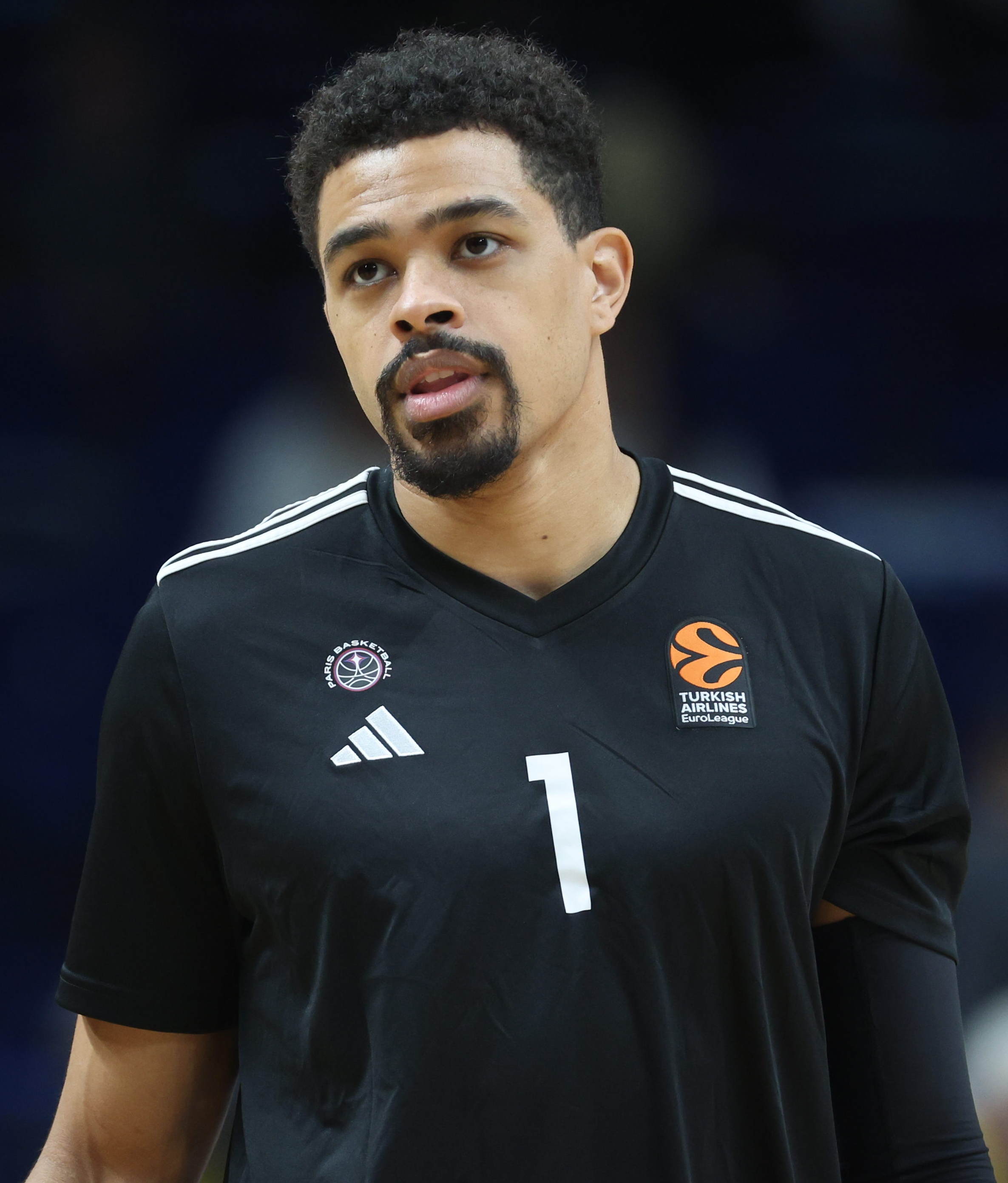
Malcolm with Paris in 2024

In July 2023, Malcolm followed coach Iisalo to France and signed with Paris Basketball of the LNB Élite and the EuroCup. In February 2024, Paris won the French League Cup title. They were also crowned the EuroCup champions, after beating fellow French team Bourg 2–0 in the finals, and thus earning a spot in the next season's EuroLeague. Paris also reached the LNB Elite Finals, but finished 2nd by 3–1 loss to AS Monaco.

On 4 October 2024, Malcolm debuted in the EuroLeague with Paris, in an 80–77 defeat against KK Crvena zvezda, recording six points.

=== Hapoel Tel Aviv ===
On 13 July, 2025, he signed with Hapoel Tel Aviv of the Israeli Basketball Premier League and the EuroLeague. In July 2026, the team parted ways with Malcolm. He had signed a two-year deal originally but only played for one year.

=== Anadolu Efes ===
On July 27, 2026, Malcolm signed with Anadolu Efes of the Turkish Basketball Super League (BSL) and the EuroLeague.

== Career statistics ==
Legend
GP	Games played	GS	Games started	MPG	Minutes per game
FG%	Field goal percentage	3P%	3-point field goal percentage	FT%	Free throw percentage
RPG	Rebounds per game	APG	Assists per game	SPG	Steals per game
BPG	Blocks per game	PPG	Points per game	**Bold**	Career high

†	Denotes season in which Malcolm won the Cup/League

=== EuroLeague ===
Year	Team	GP	GS	MPG	FG%	3P%	FT%	RPG	APG	SPG	BPG	PPG	PIR
2024–25	Paris Basketball	33	9	18.6	.440	.327	**.771**	2.5	**1.2**	.4	**.2**	**7.7**	7.2
2025–26	Hapoel Tel Aviv	**40**	**32**	**24.5**	**.504**	**.417**	.756	**3.6**	1.0	**.8**	**.2**	6.8	**8.5**
Career		73	41	22.1	.472	.367	.764	3.1	1.1	.6	.2	7.2	7.9

=== EuroCup ===
Year	Team	GP	GS	MPG	FG%	3P%	FT%	RPG	APG	SPG	BPG	PPG	PIR
2023–24†	Paris Basketball	22	11	22.6	.565	.362	.692	3.7	1.5	.6	.3	12.5	14.1

=== FIBA Champions League ===
Year	Team	GP	GS	MPG	FG%	3P%	FT%	RPG	APG	SPG	BPG	PPG
2022–23†	Bonn	15	15	23.5	.505	.326	.619	4.1	1.3	.5	.7	8.8

=== Domestic leagues ===
Year	Team	League	GP	MPG	FG%	3P%	FT%	RPG	APG	SPG	BPG	PPG
2019–20	(Georgia (country)) Batumi	Superliga	15	32.9	.598	.389	.750	8.3	2.3	1.2	1.6	19.0
2020–21	(Finland) Kauhajoki Karhu	Korisliiga	28	31.3	.549	.347	.798	6.0	3.2	1.1	.8	18.1
2021–22	(Cyprus) Keravnos	Division A	19	37.3	.557	.364	.732	9.7	2.4	1.4	.7	19.4
2022–23	(Germany) Bonn	BBL	30	21.0	.512	.301	.633	3.9	1.6	.8	.2	9.2
2023–24	(France) Paris	LNB Élite	31	22.6	.455	.297	.733	3.7	1.2	.8	.1	9.3
2024–25	(France) Paris	LNB Élite	26	19.7	.492	.378	.714	3.5	1.3	.4	.1	10.4
