= Ercan Osmani =

Turkish basketball player (born 1998)

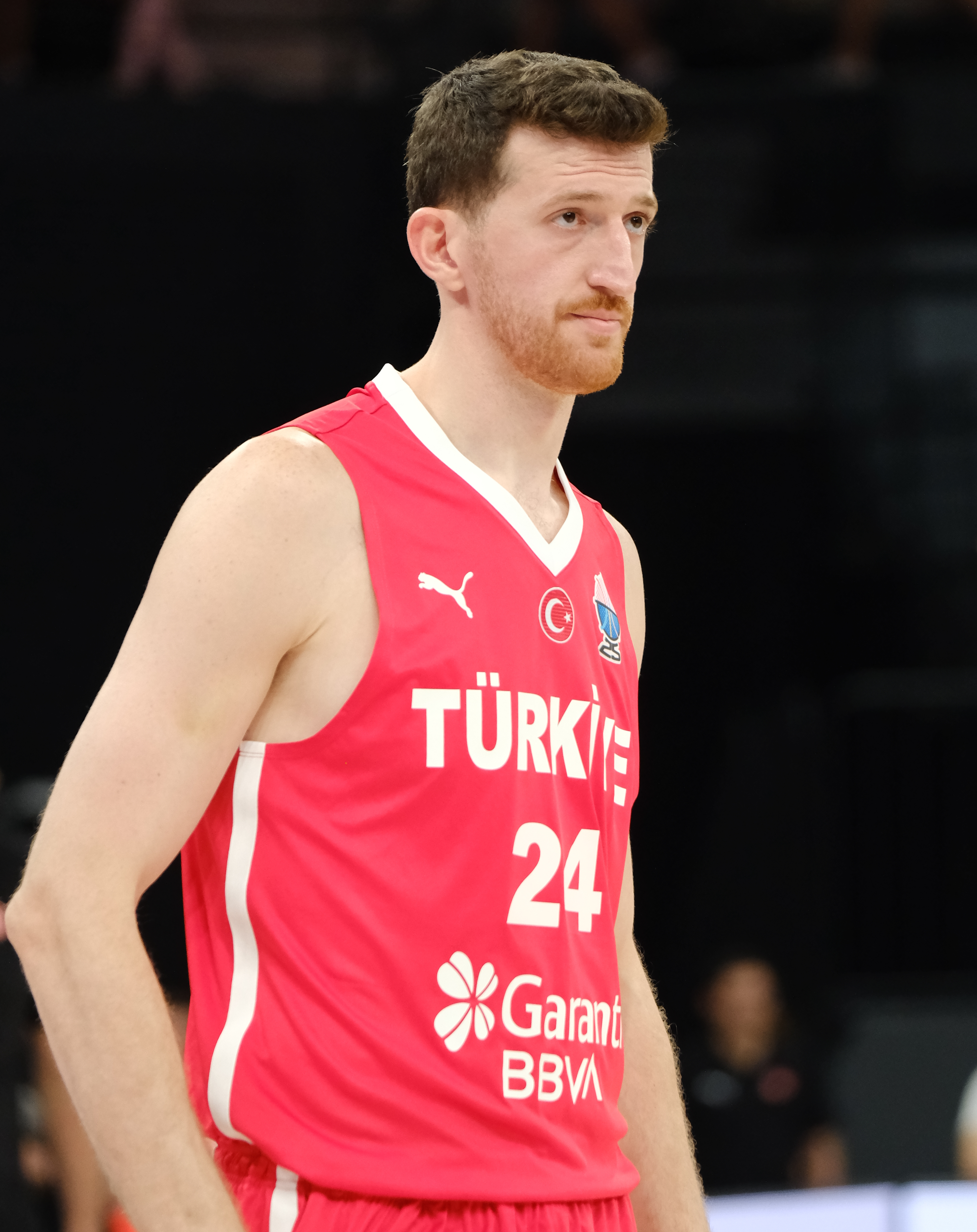
- Osmani in 2025

No. 24 – Anadolu Efes
- Position: Power forward / center
- League: BSL; EuroLeague

Personal information
- Born: August 4, 1998 (age 28) Bajram Curri, Tropojë, Albania
- Listed height: 7 ft 0 in (2.13 m)
- Listed weight: 225 lb (102 kg)

Career information
- Playing career: 2014–present

Career history
- 2014–2018: Bandırma Kırmızı
- 2018–2020: Bandırma
- 2020–2022: Beşiktaş
- 2022–2023: Darüşşafaka
- 2023–present: Anadolu Efes

Career highlights
- Turkish Supercup winner (2024); VTB United League Supercup winner (2026)
Medals
Men's basketball
Representing Turkey
EuroBasket
Silver medal – second place	2025 Cyprus–Finland–Poland–Latvia

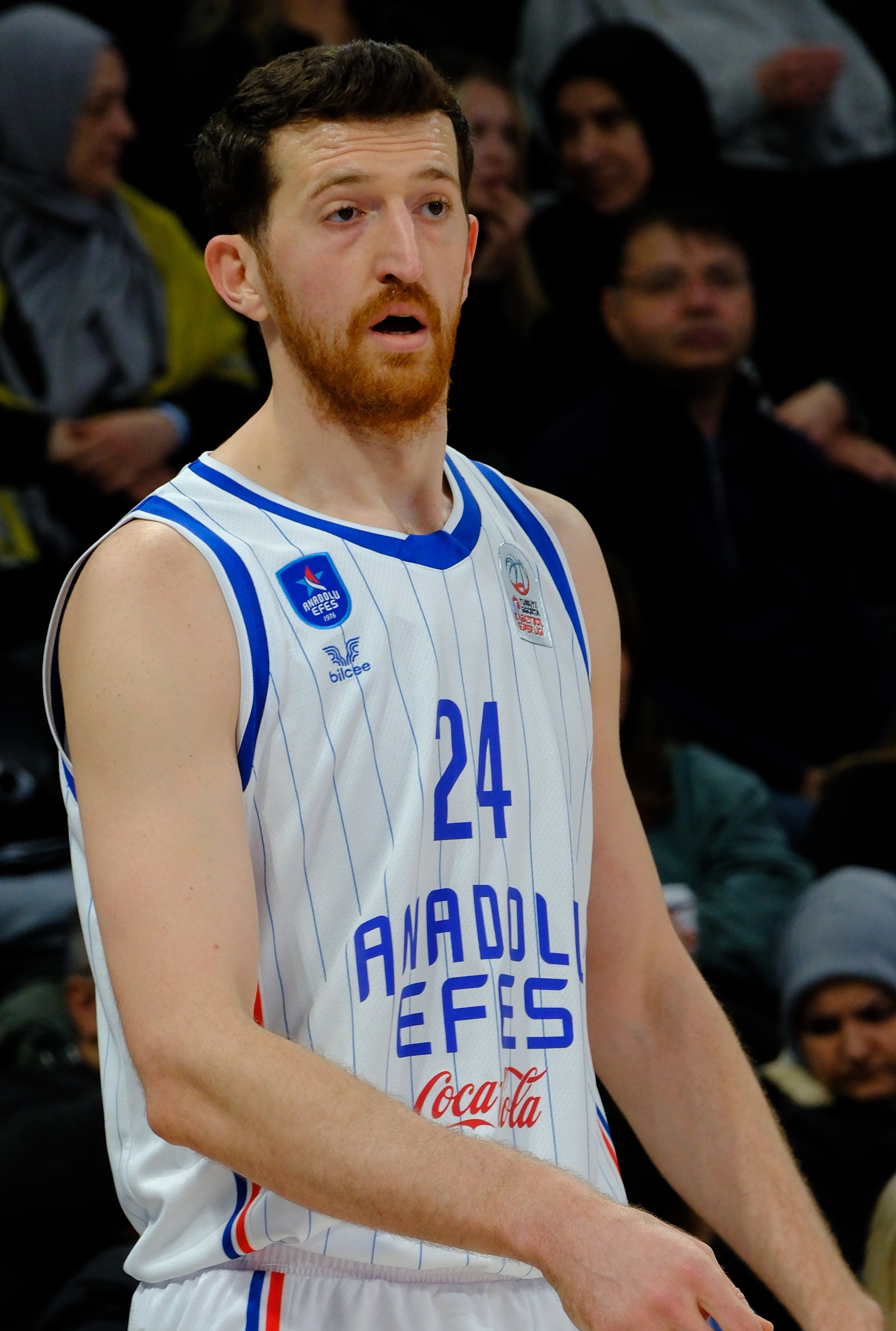

Ercan Osmani (Albanian: Erxhan Osmani, [ɛɾdʒan ɔsmani]; born August 4, 1998) is an Albanian and Turkish basketball player for Anadolu Efes of the Turkish Basketbol Süper Ligi (BSL) and the EuroLeague.

== Career ==
Before starting his professional career, Osmani played for the Kosovan youth teams Junior 06 led by Ramush Rushiti, and Bashkimi from Prizren.

After playing for Teksüt Bandırma, on August 8, 2020, Osmani signed a two-year contract with Beşiktaş.

On June 6, 2022, he signed a two-year contract with Darüşşafaka.

On August 14, 2023, Osmani signed with the league champions Anadolu Efes. jahah

== National team career ==
Osmani represents senior Turkish national basketball team. He was part of the roster that competed in EuroBasket 2022.

== Career statistics ==
Legend
GP	Games played	GS	Games started	MPG	Minutes per game
FG%	Field-goal percentage	3P%	3-point field-goal percentage	FT%	Free-throw percentage
RPG	Rebounds per game	APG	Assists per game	SPG	Steals per game
BPG	Blocks per game	PPG	Points per game	PIR	Performance index rating
**Bold**	Career high

=== EuroLeague ===
Year	Team	GP	GS	MPG	FG%	3P%	FT%	RPG	APG	SPG	BPG	PPG	PIR
2023–24	Anadolu Efes	23	16	13.4	.438	.342	1.000	2.6	.6	.6	.1	4.4	4.4
Career		23	16	13.4	.438	.342	1.000	2.6	.6	.6	.1	4.4	4.4

=== Basketball Champions League ===
Year	Team	GP	GS	MPG	FG%	3P%	FT%	RPG	APG	SPG	BPG	PPG
2018–19	Banvit B.K.	8	2	8.6	**.522**	**.500**	.500	2.0	.4	.2	.1	3.6
2021–22	Beşiktaş	8	1	17.5	.452	.300	.722	3.7	**1.4**	.4	.2	6.7
2022–23	Darüşşafaka	**11**	**9**	**24.1**	.506	.263	**.759**	**6.4**	1.0	**1.4**	**.8**	**10.1**
Career		27	12	17.4	.493	.303	.717	4.3	.9	.8	.4	7.2

=== Domestic leagues ===
Year	Team	League	GP	MPG	FG%	3P%	FT%	RPG	APG	SPG	BPG	PPG
2016–17	(Turkey) Bandırma Kırmızı	TBL	26	18.0	.600	.300	.635	5.2	.6	.8	.6	8.1
2017–18	(Turkey) Bandırma Kırmızı	TBL	27	29.3	.522	.277	.722	8.4	1.4	1.1	1.3	12.9
2018–19	(Turkey) Banvit B.K.	TBSL	7	6.8	.400	.167	1.000	1.3	.7	.4	.1	2.9
2019–20	(Turkey) Bandırma Kırmızı	TBL	24	32.8	.578	.192	.789	11.4	.9	.7	1.0	20.7
2020–21	(Turkey) Beşiktaş	TBSL	20	20.1	.617	.444	.611	4.0	.8	.8	.0	9.1
2021–22	(Turkey) Beşiktaş	TBSL	21	19.0	.574	.440	.746	3.9	.9	.7	.7	9.4
2022–23	(Turkey) Darüşşafaka	TBSL	32	22.0	.505	.356	.740	4.8	1.7	.6	.5	9.0
2023–24	(Turkey) Anadolu Efes	TBSL	38	18.8	.535	.373	.833	3.8	.6	.7	.2	8.0
