= Sarper David Mutaf =

Turkish-Russian basketball player (born 2002)

- Mutaf in 2026

No. 23 – Anadolu Efes
- Position: Shooting guard / small forward
- League: BSL; EuroLeague

Personal information
- Born: June 14, 2002 (age 24) Istanbul, Turkey
- Listed height: 6 ft 5 in (1.96 m)
- Listed weight: 188 lb (85 kg)

Career information
- College: Minnesota (2020–2021)
- Playing career: 2019–present

Career history
- 2019–2020: Fenerbahçe
- 2021–2025: Gran Canaria
- 2021–2022: →Gran Canaria II
- 2023–2025: →Bursaspor
- 2025–present: Anadolu Efes

Career highlights
- EuroCup champion (2023); VTB United League Supercup winner (2026)
Medals
Men's basketball
Representing Turkey
FIBA U16 EuroBasket
Bronze medal – third place	2018 Serbia	U16 Team

Sarper David Mutaf (Russian: Сарпер Давид Мутаф; born June 14, 2002, in Istanbul, Turkey) is a Turkish professional basketball player for Anadolu Efes of the Turkish Basketbol Süper Ligi (BSL) and the EuroLeague.

== Professional career ==
Mutaf began his career with Fenerbahçe in the 2019–20 season and left the team for Minnesota University and played in the NCAA, but one year later he back to Europe for Gran Canaria II.

On 28 January 2021, he debuted with the Gran Canaria in the Liga ACB against Valencia Basket.

He loaned from Grand Canaria to Bursaspor Basketbol for the 2023-24 Basketbol Süper Ligi and he also renewed his loan contract for the 2024–25 season.

On June 2, 2025, he signed with Anadolu Efes of the Turkish Basketbol Süper Ligi (BSL).

== National team career ==
Mutaf was a regular member of the U16, U18 and U20 national basketball teams of Turkey.

== Personal life ==
Mutaf has a Turkish father and a Russian mother. Mutaf and his brother Can Maxim Mutaf both have Russian citizenship.
