= Burak Can Yıldızlı =

Turkish basketball player

No. 19 – Anadolu Efes
- Position: Power forward
- League: BSL; EuroLeague

Personal information
- Born: April 22, 1994 (age 32) Tokat, Turkey
- Listed height: 6 ft 8 in (2.03 m)
- Listed weight: 190 lb (86 kg)

Career information
- Playing career: 2010–present

Career history
- 2010–2015: Anadolu Efes
- 2010–2013: →Pertevniyal
- 2014–2015: →Pertevniyal
- 2015–2018: Büyükçekmece
- 2018–2020: Beşiktaş
- 2020–2021: Bahçeşehir
- 2021–2022: Karşıyaka
- 2022–2023: Beşiktaş
- 2023–present: Anadolu Efes

Career highlights
- Turkish Supercup winner (2024); VTB United League Supercup winner (2026)

Burak Can Yıldızlı (born April 22, 1994) is a Turkish professional basketball player for Anadolu Efes of the Turkish Basketbol Süper Ligi (BSL) and the EuroLeague. Standing 6 ft 8 in (2.03 m), he plays at the power forward position.

== Career statistics ==
Legend
GP	Games played	GS	Games started	MPG	Minutes per game
FG%	Field-goal percentage	3P%	3-point field-goal percentage	FT%	Free-throw percentage
RPG	Rebounds per game	APG	Assists per game	SPG	Steals per game
BPG	Blocks per game	PPG	Points per game	PIR	Performance index rating
**Bold**	Career high

=== EuroLeague ===
Year	Team	GP	GS	MPG	FG%	3P%	FT%	RPG	APG	SPG	BPG	PPG	PIR
2023–24	Anadolu Efes	1	—	1.0	—	—	—	—	—	—	—	—	0.0
Career		1	—	1.0	—	—	—	—	—	—	—	—	0.0

=== EuroCup ===
Year	Team	GP	GS	MPG	FG%	3P%	FT%	RPG	APG	SPG	BPG	PPG	PIR
2020–21	Bahçeşehir Koleji	8	7	26.5	.309	.182	.720	3.8	1.5	.4	.3	7.0	4.6
Career		8	7	26.5	.309	.182	.720	3.8	1.5	.4	.3	7.0	4.6

=== Basketball Champions League ===
Year	Team	GP	GS	MPG	FG%	3P%	FT%	RPG	APG	SPG	BPG	PPG
2018–19	Beşiktaş	12	**6**	14.6	.370	.214	**.769**	3.1	.4	.4	**.4**	3.9
2019–20	Beşiktaş	**15**	5	**24.1**	**.422**	.368	.591	**4.3**	**1.7**	**.7**	.1	**8.4**
2021–22	Karşıyaka	8	1	9.3	.357	**.500**	.500	1.9	.1	—	—	1.9
Career		35	12	17.4	.401	.339	.619	3.3	1.1	.4	.2	5.4

=== FIBA Europe Cup ===
Year	Team	GP	GS	MPG	FG%	3P%	FT%	RPG	APG	SPG	BPG	PPG
2016–17	Büyükçekmece	**13**	0	16.7	**.507**	.200	.606	**3.5**	**.7**	**.2**	**.1**	**7.1**
2017–18	Büyükçekmece	10	**4**	**17.9**	.404	**.214**	**.667**	3.3	.5	.1	**.1**	4.9
Career		23	4	17.2	.466	.207	.622	3.4	.6	.2	.1	6.2

=== Domestic leagues ===
Year	Team	League	GP	MPG	FG%	3P%	FT%	RPG	APG	SPG	BPG	PPG
2011–12	(Turkey) Pertevniyal	TB2L	36	31.3	.417	.277	.621	8.7	1.0	.8	.1	14.4
2012–13	(Turkey) Pertevniyal	TB2L	34	24.5	.420	.278	.657	5.6	1.2	.4	.3	9.7
2013–14	(Turkey) Pertevniyal	TB2L	24	28.1	.445	.220	.623	7.9	1.5	.7	.2	12.4
2013–14	(Turkey) Anadolu Efes	TBSL	2	5.0	—	—	—	1.5	—	—	—	0.0
2014–15	(Turkey) Pertevniyal	TB2L	27	22.9	.451	.250	.691	5.7	1.6	.7	.2	11.3
2015–16	(Turkey) Büyükçekmece	TBSL	30	10.8	.477	.150	.703	2.0	.3	.2	.2	3.0
2016–17	(Turkey) Büyükçekmece	TBSL	23	11.7	.554	.364	.552	2.5	.6	.3	.1	4.4
2017–18	(Turkey) Büyükçekmece	TBSL	28	16.4	.442	.313	.750	2.7	.8	.4	.1	4.7
2018–19	(Turkey) Beşiktaş	TBSL	27	13.5	.404	.148	.467	3.0	.6	.4	—	3.4
2019–20	(Turkey) Beşiktaş	TBSL	20	26.5	.487	.282	.571	5.1	1.9	.8	—	9.5
2020–21	(Turkey) Bahçeşehir Koleji	TBSL	27	21.6	.373	.262	.604	5.3	1.7	.4	.1	6.6
2021–22	(Turkey) Karşıyaka	TBSL	26	14.4	.468	.154	.727	3.1	.9	.3	.0	3.8
2022–23	(Turkey) Beşiktaş	TBSL	30	17.5	.443	.289	.696	4.1	1.1	.2	—	5.3
2023–24	(Turkey) Anadolu Efes	TBSL	27	6.7	.450	.429	.857	1.4	.2	.1	.0	2.0
