= 2024 Turkish Basketball Presidential Cup =

Anadolu Efes	Fenerbahçe Beko
83	82
- Date: 29 September 2024
- Venue: Basketbol Gelişim Merkezi, Istanbul
- MVP: (United States) Elijah Bryant

The 2024 Turkish Basketball Presidential Cup (Turkish: 2024 Erkekler Basketbol Cumhurbaşkanlığı Kupası) was the 37th edition of the Turkish Basketball Presidential Cup. The game was played between Fenerbahçe Beko, champions of the 2023–24 Basketbol Süper Ligi, also winners of the 2024 Turkish Basketball Cup and Anadolu Efes, runners-up of the 2023–24 Basketbol Süper Ligi.

Anadolu Efes won 13 championship in their 24 final appearance, while Fenerbahçe played a total of 17 President's Cup finals and won only 7 of them.

== Venue ==
Istanbul	2024 Turkish Basketball Presidential Cup (Turkey)
Basketbol Gelişim Merkezi	2024 Turkish Basketball Presidential Cup (Turkey)
Capacity: 10,000	2024 Turkish Basketball Presidential Cup (Turkey)

== Match details ==
Elijah Bryant, who had 21 points, 8 rebounds and 5 assist in the game, was named the Presidential Cup MVP.

29 September 2024	Anadolu Efes	83–82	Fenerbahçe Beko	Istanbul
18:00 TRT (UTC +3)	Scoring by quarter: 24–20, 15–23, 25–14, 19–25
TRT Spor	Pts: Bryant 21; Rebs: Bryant 8 Asts: Bryant, Thompson 5 PIR: Bryant 25	Boxscore	Pts: Hayes-Davis 20; Rebs: Colson 6 Asts: Baldwin 4 PIR: Colson 24	Arena: Basketbol Gelişim Merkezi; Referees: Yener Yılmaz, Kerem Baki, Ayşe Nur Yazıcıoğlu

Starters:			Pts	Reb	Ast
PG	13	(United States) Darius Thompson	6	3	5
SG	6	(United States) Elijah Bryant	21	8	5
SF	33	(Turkey) Erkan Yılmaz	2	3	1
PF	24	(Turkey) Ercan Osmani	13	4	2
C	25	(United States) Daniel Oturu	16	6	1
Reserves:					
SG	1	(France) Rodrigue Beaubois	9	0	2
SF	3	(Nigeria) Jordan Nwora	7	2	0
PG	10	(Turkey) Rıdvan Öncel	0	0	0
C	17	(France) Vincent Poirier	2	2	1
PG	18	(Turkey) Doğuş Özdemiroğlu	4	0	0
PF	19	(Turkey) Burak Can Yıldızlı	DNP		
PF	35	(United States) Derek Willis	3	4	1
Head coach:
(Croatia) Tomislav Mijatović

Anadolu Efes	Fenerbahçe

A. Efes	Statistics	Fenerbahçe
22/45 (48,9%)	2-pt field goals	16/31 (51,6%)
8/18 (44,4%)	3-pt field goals	9/23 (39,1%)
15/19 (79%)	Free throws	23/31 (74,2%)
12	Offensive rebounds	9
23	Defensive rebounds	21
35	Total rebounds	30
18	Assists	14
9	Turnovers	11
7	Steals	4
0	Blocks	5
24	Fouls	20

2024 Turkish Presidential Cup champions
Anadolu Efes
(14th title)

Starters:			Pts	Reb	Ast
PG	20	(United States) Devon Hall	7	3	2
SG	10	(Turkey) Melih Mahmutoğlu	0	0	0
SF	50	(United States) Bonzie Colson	19	6	2
PF	11	(United States) Nigel Hayes	20	4	3
C	51	(Serbia) Boban Marjanović	4	2	0
Reserves:					
PF	1	(Turkey) Metecan Birsen	3	1	0
G	2	(Turkey) Wade Baldwin IV	7	5	4
SG	3	(Turkey) Scottie Wilbekin	14	1	3
F/C	4	(Italy) Nicolò Melli	8	5	0
PG	5	(Turkey) Sertaç Şanlı	0	1	0
SG	15	(Turkey) Mert Emre Ekşioğlu	0	0	0
SG	77	(Turkey) Erten Gazi	DNP		
Head coach:
(Lithuania) Šarūnas Jasikevičius
