= Santiago Yusta =

Spanish basketball player (born 1997)

- Yusta with Anadolu Efes in 2026

No. 4 – Anadolu Efes
- Position: Small forward
- League: BSL; EuroLeague

Personal information
- Born: April 28, 1997 (age 29) Madrid, Spain
- Listed height: 6 ft 7 in (2.01 m)
- Listed weight: 183 lb (83 kg)

Career information
- Playing career: 2015–present

Career history
- 2015: Real Madrid
- 2015–2017: Obradoiro
- 2017–2019: Real Madrid
- 2019–2021: Canarias
- 2021–2026: Zaragoza
- 2026–present: Anadolu Efes

Career highlights
- EuroLeague champion (2018); FIBA Intercontinental Cup champion (2020); Liga ACB champion (2018, 2019); VTB United League Supercup winner (2026); ACB All-Young Players Team (2016); Next Generation Tournament winner (2015)

Santiago Yusta García (born April 28, 1997) is a Spanish professional basketball player for Anadolu Efes of the Turkish Basketbol Süper Ligi (BSL) and the EuroLeague.

== Professional career ==
After coming through the youth ranks of Club Baloncesto Torrejón and Real Madrid, Yusta made his debut for Real’s second men’s team in the fourth-tier of Spanish basketball, EBA, during the 2013-14 season. In the course of the 2014-15 season, he logged his first minutes in the ACB, Spain’s top league, and helped Real’s youth squad win the 2015 Euroleague Next Generation Tournament title.

In July 2015, he moved from Madrid to fellow ACB outfit Obradoiro, signing a three-year deal with the club. In his first season with Obradoiro, he was named to the All-ACB Best Young Players Team.

In July 2017, Yusta signed a two-year deal with Real Madrid.

On July 13, 2019, Yusta signed a two-year deal with Spanish club Iberostar Tenerife.

On July 6, 2021, he has signed with Casademont Zaragoza of the Liga ACB.

On July 8, 2026, he signed with Anadolu Efes of the Turkish Basketbol Süper Ligi (BSL).

== National team career ==
Yusta made nine appearances for the Spanish under-16 national team, averaging 13.3 points, 5.2 rebounds, 2.0 assists and 2.1 steals a contest, as they captured the European championship in 2013. In 2014, he led the Spanish under-17 national team to the semifinals at the World Championships, putting up averages of 14.1 points and 3.9 boards per outing. Yusta also played for Spain at the U18 European Championships in 2015 and was a key-part of the team that won gold at the 2016 U20 European Championships. He scored 10.7 points per contest during the tournament, while pulling down 5.4 rebounds a game, dishing out 2.4 assists and snagging 2.1 steals per outing. On July 1, 2018, Yusta made his debut with the Spanish national team with an 80-60 victory over Belarus scoring 4 points and dishing out 2 assists in 10 minutes.

== Career statistics ==
Legend
GP	Games played	GS	Games started	MPG	Minutes per game
FG%	Field-goal percentage	3P%	3-point field-goal percentage	FT%	Free-throw percentage
RPG	Rebounds per game	APG	Assists per game	SPG	Steals per game
BPG	Blocks per game	PPG	Points per game	PIR	Performance index rating
**Bold**	Career high

=== EuroLeague ===
†	Denotes seasons in which Yusta won the EuroLeague

Year	Team	GP	GS	MPG	FG%	3P%	FT%	RPG	APG	SPG	BPG	PPG	PIR
2017–18	Real Madrid	**16**	**10**	6.8	**.484**	.273	**.714**	**.9**	**.8**	.1	**.1**	2.4	**2.3**
2018–19	Real Madrid	6	2	**7.7**	.467	**.429**	.625	.8	.5	**.2**	—	**3.7**	2.2
Career		22	12	7.0	.478	.333	.667	.9	.7	.1	.0	2.7	2.3
