= Erkan Yılmaz =

Turkish basketball player (born 1997)

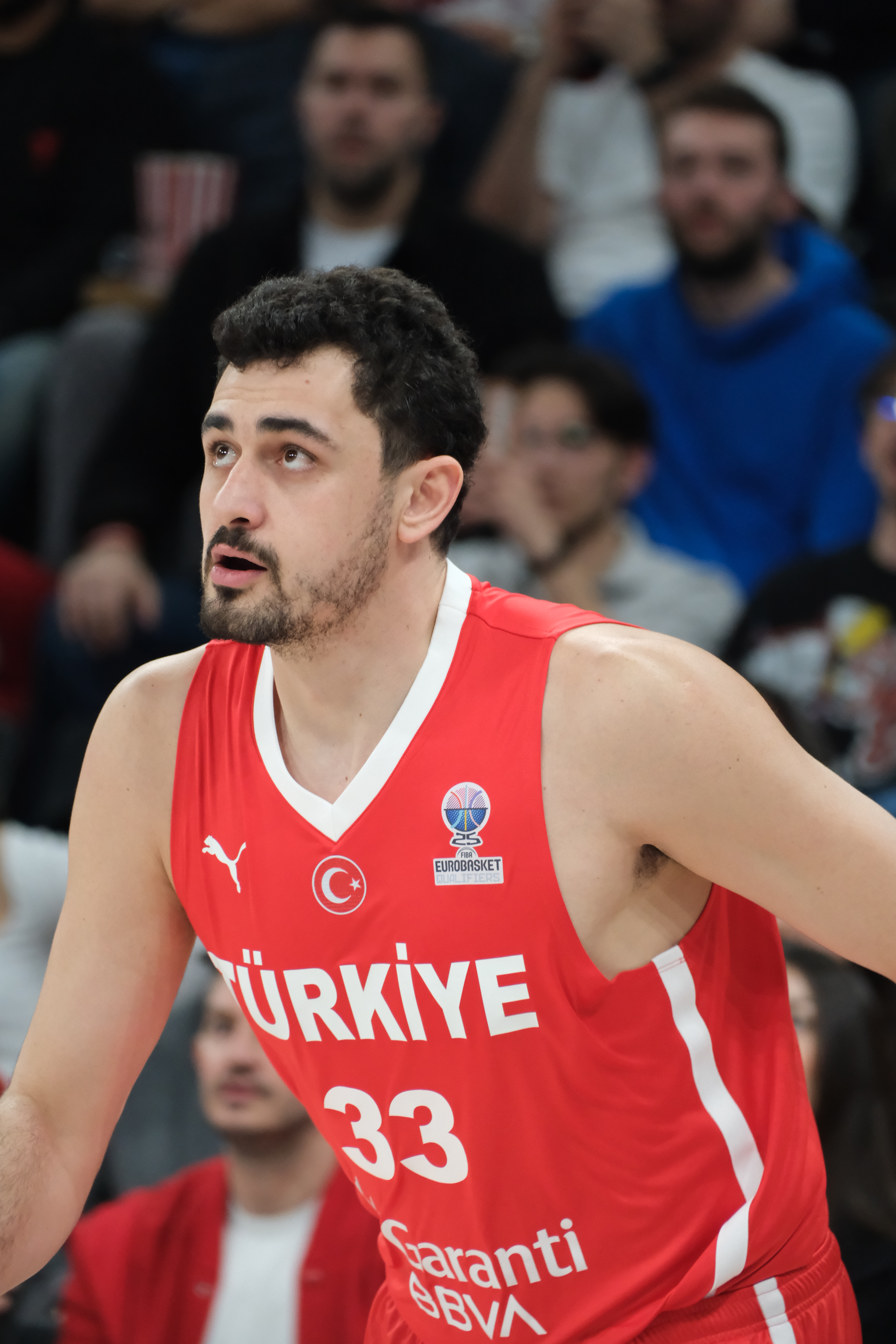
- Yılmaz with the Turkey national team in 2025

No. 33 – Anadolu Efes
- Position: Small forward
- League: BSL; EuroLeague

Personal information
- Born: December 3, 1997 (age 28) Istanbul, Turkey
- Listed height: 6 ft 5 in (1.96 m)
- Listed weight: 192 lb (87 kg)

Career information
- Playing career: 2013–present

Career history
- 2013–2015: Antalyaspor
- 2015–2016: Banvit
- 2016–2017: Bandırma Kırmızı
- 2017–2018: Yeşilgiresun
- 2018–2019: Yeni Mamak
- 2019–2020: Bandırma
- 2020–2022: Bahçeşehir
- 2022–2023: Türk Telekom
- 2023–present: Anadolu Efes

Career highlights
- FIBA Europe Cup champion (2022); Turkish Supercup winner (2024); VTB United League Supercup winner (2026)
Medals
Men's basketball
Representing Turkey
EuroBasket
Silver medal – second place	2025 Cyprus–Finland–Poland–Latvia

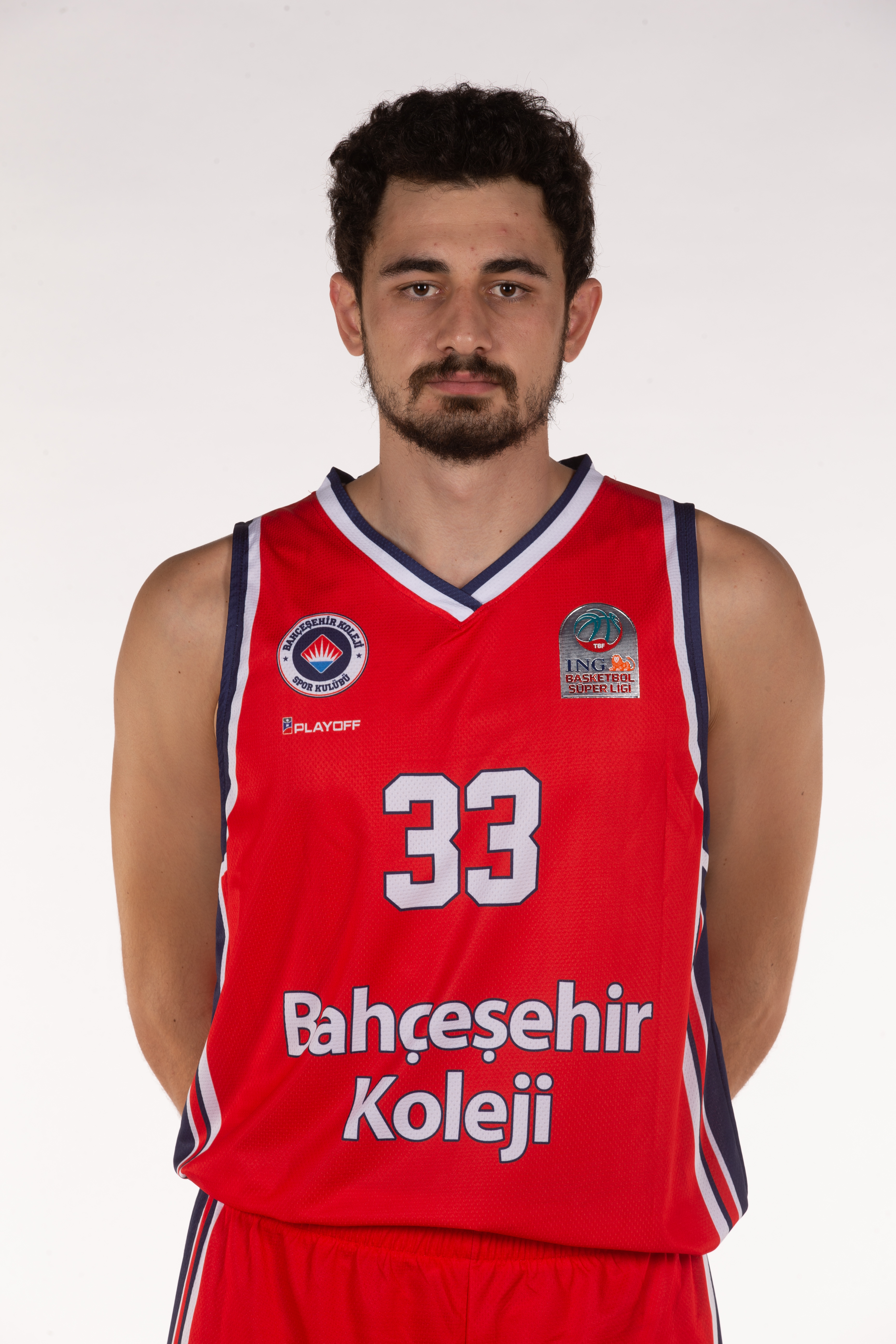

Erkan Yılmaz (born December 3, 1997) is a Turkish professional basketball player and the team captain for Anadolu Efes of the Turkish Basketbol Süper Ligi (BSL) and the EuroLeague. He plays at the small forward position.

== Career statistics ==
Legend
GP	Games played	GS	Games started	MPG	Minutes per game
FG%	Field-goal percentage	3P%	3-point field-goal percentage	FT%	Free-throw percentage
RPG	Rebounds per game	APG	Assists per game	SPG	Steals per game
BPG	Blocks per game	PPG	Points per game	PIR	Performance index rating
**Bold**	Career high

=== EuroLeague ===
Year	Team	GP	GS	MPG	FG%	3P%	FT%	RPG	APG	SPG	BPG	PPG	PIR
2023–24	Anadolu Efes	14	3	8.9	.348	.286	.000	1.8	1.1	.6	.3	1.4	2.1
Career		14	3	8.9	.348	.286	.000	1.8	1.1	.6	.3	1.4	2.1

=== EuroCup ===
Year	Team	GP	GS	MPG	FG%	3P%	FT%	RPG	APG	SPG	BPG	PPG	PIR
2015–16	Bandırma B.İ.K.	8	1	6.9	.111	.000	—	1.1	.4	.3	.1	.3	-0.4
2020–21	Bahçeşehir Koleji	10	0	12.1	**.565**	**.333**	.600	2.5	1.3	.5	.2	3.5	4.8
2022–23	Türk Telekom	**22**	**8**	**21.0**	.471	.309	**.615**	**4.4**	**2.6**	**1.6**	**.6**	**6.7**	**9.6**
Career		40	9	16.0	.464	.294	.611	3.3	1.9	1.1	.4	4.6	6.4

=== Basketball Champions League ===
Year	Team	GP	GS	MPG	FG%	3P%	FT%	RPG	APG	SPG	BPG	PPG
2019–20	Banvit B.K.	11	2	12.5	.417	.250	.636	3.0	.8	.8	.5	3.7
Career		11	2	12.5	.417	.250	.636	3.0	.8	.8	.5	3.7

=== FIBA Europe Cup ===
Year	Team	GP	GS	MPG	FG%	3P%	FT%	RPG	APG	SPG	BPG	PPG
2021–22	Bahçeşehir Koleji	18	4	19.3	.506	.281	.667	4.1	1.2	1.2	.8	6.9
Career		18	4	19.3	.506	.281	.667	4.1	1.2	1.2	.8	6.9

=== Domestic leagues ===
Year	Team	League	GP	MPG	FG%	3P%	FT%	RPG	APG	SPG	BPG	PPG
2015–16	(Turkey) Banvit B.K.	TBSL	27	5.4	.429	.000	.429	.7	.1	.2	.5	1.1
2016–17	(Turkey) Bandırma Kırmızı	TBL	33	19.5	.448	.212	.559	3.3	2.6	1.5	.6	6.8
2017–18	(Turkey) Yeşilgiresun	TBSL	14	7.1	.500	.333	.625	1.7	.4	.3	.1	2.5
2018–19	(Turkey) Yeni Mamak	TBL	33	29.8	.556	.298	.658	6.8	3.1	1.6	.8	13.2
2019–20	(Turkey) Bandırma B.İ.K.	TBSL	18	12.3	.375	.095	.647	3.1	1.7	.7	.2	2.7
2020–21	(Turkey) Bahçeşehir Koleji	TBSL	27	14.6	.536	.326	.600	3.5	1.3	.7	.4	5.1
2021–22	(Turkey) Bahçeşehir Koleji	TBSL	31	17.7	.476	.250	.615	4.1	2.2	.7	.3	5.7
2022–23	(Turkey) Türk Telekom	TBSL	37	22.9	.446	.328	.750	5.3	2.7	1.0	.7	7.3
2023–24	(Turkey) Anadolu Efes	TBSL	28	19.6	.403	.260	.854	3.8	2.5	1.0	.5	5.8
