= VTB United League Supercup =

Basketball competition

- Current season, competition or edition: 2026 VTB United League Supercup
- Sport: Basketball
- Founded: 2021; 5 years ago
- First season: 2021
- CEO: Sergei Kuschenko
- No. of teams: 6
- Continent: Europe
- Most recent champions: (Turkey) Anadolu Efes (2026)
- Most titles: (Russia) CSKA Moscow (3 titles)
- Broadcaster: Kinopoisk
- Related competitions: VTB United League
- Website: vtb-league.com

The VTB United League Supercup, also credited as VTB League Super Cup, is a men's professional basketball supercup competition between teams from the VTB United League. Its main sponsor is VTB Bank. It is a regional competition, that is contested between teams from five countries: Russia, Belarus, Estonia, Kazakhstan and Poland. In the first edition of the Supercup in 2021 all participants were from Russia.

== History ==
The VTB United League Council, held online on June 12, 2021, in the press center of the Russian news agency TASS, approved the creation of an annual Supercup with the participation of the best 4 teams of the previous regular season. The winner will be awarded the Alexander Gomelsky Cup, named after the legendary CSKA and Soviet national team coach.

The first tournament was organized by VTB United League in cooperation with the Moscow city Department of Sports and took place in Moscow, Russia.

== Finals ==
Season	Hosts	Finals			Third-place games		
Season	Hosts	Gold	Score	Silver	Bronze	Score	Fourth Place
2021	Russia (VTB Arena, Moscow)	CSKA Moscow	81–73	Zenit Saint Petersburg	UNICS Kazan	84–70	Lokomotiv Kuban
2022	Russia (VTB Arena, Moscow)	Zenit Saint Petersburg	71–70	CSKA Moscow	UNICS Kazan	83–77	Partizan
2023	Russia (VTB Arena, Moscow)	Zenit Saint Petersburg	85–83	Lokomotiv Kuban	Fenerbahçe	82–80	Nizhny Novgorod
2024	Russia (VTB Arena, Moscow)	CSKA Moscow	87–72	UNICS Kazan	Zenit Saint Petersburg	83–70	Crvena zvezda
2025	Serbia (Belgrade Arena, Belgrade)	CSKA Moscow	96–79	Zenit Saint Petersburg	Crvena zvezda	82–80	Dubai Basketball
2026	Russia (VTB Arena, Moscow)	Anadolu Efes	88–82	Lokomotiv Kuban	CSKA Moscow	79–59	UNICS Kazan

== All-time participants ==
The following is a list of clubs that have played in the VTB League Supercup at least once since its formation in 2021.

=== Key ===
1st	Champions
2nd	Runners-up
–	Did not participate

=== List of participants ===
Team	21	22	23	24	25	26	Total seasons	Highest finish			
Team	(Turkey) Anadolu Efes	—					Total seasons	Highest finish	1st	1	1st
(Turkey) Beşiktaş	—		5th	6th	—		2	5th			
(Serbia) Crvena zvezda	—			4th	3rd	—	2	3rd			
(Russia) CSKA Moscow	1st	2nd	6th	1st	1st	3rd	6	1st			
(United Arab Emirates) Dubai Basketball	—				4th	—	1	4th			
(Turkey) Fenerbahçe	—		3rd	—			1	3rd			
(Bosnia and Herzegovina) Igokea	—					5th	1	5th			
(Russia) Lokomotiv Kuban	4th	5th	2nd	5th	—	2nd	5	2nd			
(Russia) MBA Moscow	—		8th	—			1	8th			
(Serbia) Mega	—	6th	—				1	6th			
(Russia) Nizhny Novgorod	—		4th	—			1	4th			
(Serbia) Partizan	—	4th	—				1	4th			
(Russia) UNICS Kazan	3rd	3rd	7th	2nd	—	4th	5	2nd			
(Russia) Zenit Saint Petersburg	2nd	1st	1st	3rd	2nd	6th	6	1st			

== Awards ==
=== MVPs ===
Season	Player	Team	Ref.
2021	(United States) Will Clyburn	(Russia) CSKA Moscow	
2022	(United States) Thomas Wimbush	(Russia) Zenit Saint Petersburg	
2023	(Slovakia) Kyle Kuric	(Russia) Zenit Saint Petersburg	
2024	(Serbia) Aleksa Avramović	(Russia) CSKA Moscow	
2025	(United States) Melo Trimble	(Russia) CSKA Moscow	
2026	(United States) Mike James	(Turkey) Anadolu Efes	

== See also ==
- Soviet Basketball Cup
