= Demirel =

Demirel is a Turkish surname meaning "iron hand." Notable people with the surname include:

- Bektaş Demirel (born 1976), Turkish judoka
- Çağlar Demirel (born 1969) Kurdish politician from Turkey
- Hakan Demirel (born 1986), Turkish basketball player
- Mithat Demirel (born 1978), Turkish-German basketball player
- Muhammed Demirel (born 2002), Turkish judoka
- Nazmiye Demirel (1927–2013), First Lady of Turkey
- Serdar Demirel (born 1983), Turkish sport shooter
- Süleyman Demirel (1924–2015), Turkish politician, former prime minister and state president
- Volkan Demirel (born 1981), Turkish football goalkeeper
- Yeşim Demirel (born 1990), Turkish-German women's footballer
