= Fenerbahçe S.K. (basketball) =

Professional basketball team in Istanbul, Turkey

Fenerbahçe Tarfin
- 2026–27 Fenerbahçe S.K. (basketball) season
- Nickname: Sarı Kanaryalar (The Yellow Canaries); Sarı Lacivertliler (The Yellow-Navy Blues); Yellow Legacy
- Leagues: BSL; EuroLeague
- Founded: 1913; 113 years ago
- Arena: Ülker Sports Arena
- Capacity: 13,800
- Location: Istanbul, Turkey
- Team colors: Yellow, navy blue
- Main sponsor: Tarfin
- President: Aziz Yıldırım
- General manager: Derya Yannier
- Team manager: Cenk Renda
- Head coach: Šarūnas Jasikevičius
- Team captain: Melih Mahmutoğlu
- Championships: 2 EuroLeague; 1 Triple Crown; 16 Turkish Championships (3 pre–1967); 10 Turkish Cups; 9 Turkish Presidential Cups
- Retired numbers: 3 (6, 7, X)
- Website: fenerbahce.org
Home	Away	Third

Fenerbahçe Basketball (commonly referred as Fenerbahçe (Turkish pronunciation: [feˈnæɾbahtʃe]) or Fenerbahçe Istanbul in European matches), also known as Fenerbahçe Tarfin for sponsorship reasons, is a professional basketball team and the men's basketball department of Fenerbahçe S.K., a major Turkish multi-sport club based in Kadıköy, Istanbul, Turkey. They are one of the most successful clubs in Turkish basketball history, being the first Turkish team to have won the (2 times) EuroLeague, as well as 16 Turkish championships (13 titles in the Turkish Basketball Super League and 3 in the former Turkish Basketball Championship), 10 Turkish Cups, and 9 Turkish Presidential Cups, among others. They play their home matches at the club's own Ülker Sports and Event Hall.

The team was founded in 1913 under the roof of Fenerbahçe S.K. This was the first basketball team established within a sports club in the Ottoman Empire. Besides the two European championship titles in 2017 and 2025, Fenerbahçe have also been EuroLeague runners-up in 2016 and 2018. Fener has played in 8 EuroLeague Final Fours (2015, 2016, 2017, 2018, 2019, 2024, 2025, 2026), a record in Turkish basketball. As of 2025, Fenerbahçe is the only Turkish Basketball Super League team to score a Triple Crown and holds the 1st place in European rankings. In 2012, Fenerbahçe became the only Turkish basketball club to win against an NBA team. In 2015, Fenerbahçe made history by defeating the Brooklyn Nets on their home court at the Barclays Center, becoming the first and only Turkish team to beat an NBA franchise in the United States. With this achievement, Fenerbahçe became one of only three teams in global basketball history to accomplish such a feat.

Many European players have played for Fenerbahçe over the years, including: Šarūnas Jasikevičius, Žan Tabak, Conrad McRae, Nemanja Bjelica, Ömer Aşık, Thabo Sefolosha, Linas Kleiza, Ömer Onan, Mirsad Türkcan, David Andersen, Harun Erdenay, Damir Mršić, Bojan Bogdanović, Semih Erden, Mahmoud Abdul-Rauf, Tanoka Beard, Nikos Zisis, James Gist, Gordan Giriček, Mike Batiste, Marko Milič, Derrick Williams, Anthony Bennett, Will Solomon, Bo McCalebb, Ekpe Udoh, Pero Antić, Luigi Datome, Nikola Kalinić, Kostas Sloukas, Jan Veselý, Ali Muhammed, Nicolò Melli, Bogdan Bogdanović, Nando De Colo, Boban Marjanović, Khem Birch, and Talen Horton-Tucker. The team employed the most accomplished coach in the history of European basketball, Željko Obradović.

== History ==
=== Previous names ===
- Fenerbahçe (1913–2006, 2015–2017)
- Fenerbahçe Ülker (2006–2015)
- Fenerbahçe Doğuş (2017–2018)
- Fenerbahçe Beko (2018–2026)
- Fenerbahçe Tarfin (2026–present)

=== Early history and first titles ===
In 1913, Fenerbahçe S.K. established its first basketball team under the roof of an association sports club, but since there was no knowledge of basketball in the Ottoman Empire at that time and there was no team in the country, this attempt remained at the training level only. The branch, which was also interrupted by the Balkan Wars and World War I, was re-established in 1919 under the roof of Fenerbahçe S.K., this time under the supervision of an American instructor. However, this first serious basketball attempt also died out, as no competitor could be found.

Also in the second attempt in 1919, an announcement was made to the public by placing an advertisement in local newspapers in Istanbul.

"Our club has recently taken on a new identity and started playing basketball for the first time in our country under the supervision of an American instructor, and is proud of showing great success among its members in this regard"

— İdman (Sports) Magazine, 10 July 1919

Eventually, under the initiative of Muhtar Sencer and Cem Atabeyoğlu, it was founded in its permanent form in 1944 and achieved considerable success when the sport established itself in Turkey.

Fenerbahçe dominated the sport with players of the period such as Altan Dinçer, Sacit Seldüz, Hikmet Vardar, Erdoğan Karabelen, Yılmaz Gündüz and Mehmet Baturalp under the leadership of memorable coach Samim Göreç. It became champion of the Istanbul Basketball League in 1954–55, 1955–56, and 1956–57. By defeating its rival Galatasaray 55–47 on February 5, 1955 (the first basketball game broadcast live on radio in Turkey), Fener celebrated its first championship. The club made a new breakthrough in amateur sports, after İsmet Uluğ, one of the former football players and boxers of the club became president in 1962, and won Istanbul League titles again in 1962–63, 1963–64, 1964–65 and 1965–66.

Fenerbahçe won Turkish Basketball Championship titles in 1957, 1959, and 1965 undefeated, just before the professional Turkish Super League was founded in 1966, and made it to the European Champions Cup in 1960 and 1966.

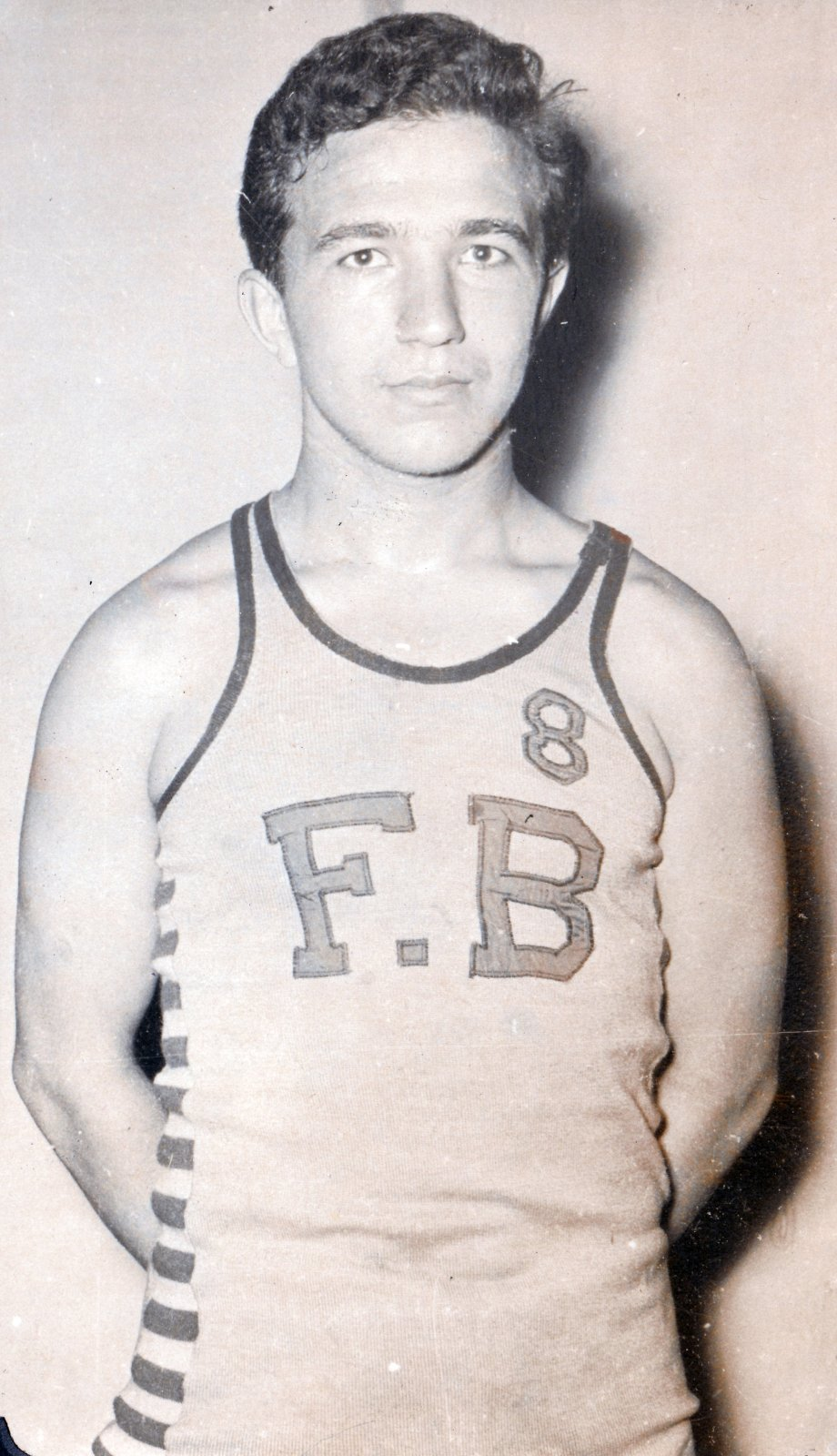
_{Mehmet Baturalp (1954-1967) won the Turkish Basketball Championship 3 times (1957, 1959, 1965) and the Istanbul Basketball League 7 times (1954, 1955, 1957, 1962, 1963, 1964, 1965) with Fenerbahçe}

It remained a solid team in the rest of the 1960s, but had mixed success in the following decades, especially the 70s and 80s. Those decades were dominated by the likes of Efes Pilsen and Eczacıbaşı, and later also Ülkerspor, which won most of the titles. As these teams belonged to corporations with solid financial background and support, traditional sports clubs such as Fenerbahçe had difficulties keeping up with them.

Fenerbahçe finished as the league leader three times with stars such as Erman Kunter, Aytek Gürkan, Can Sonat, Ferhat Oktay, Pete Williams and Larry Richard in the seasons 1984–85, 1987–88 and 1989–90, but was eliminated in the playoffs. Erman Kunter broke the record by scoring 153 points in a game of the 1987–1988 season, in which the yellow-navy blues team beat Hilalspor 175–101. Fenerbahçe would reach championship in 1991 that the fans were waiting for. Levent Topsakal, Larry Richard, Hüsnü Çakırgil and head coach Çetin Yılmaz led Fenerbahçe to the Turkish League title over Tofaş.

=== 1990s and 2000s ===
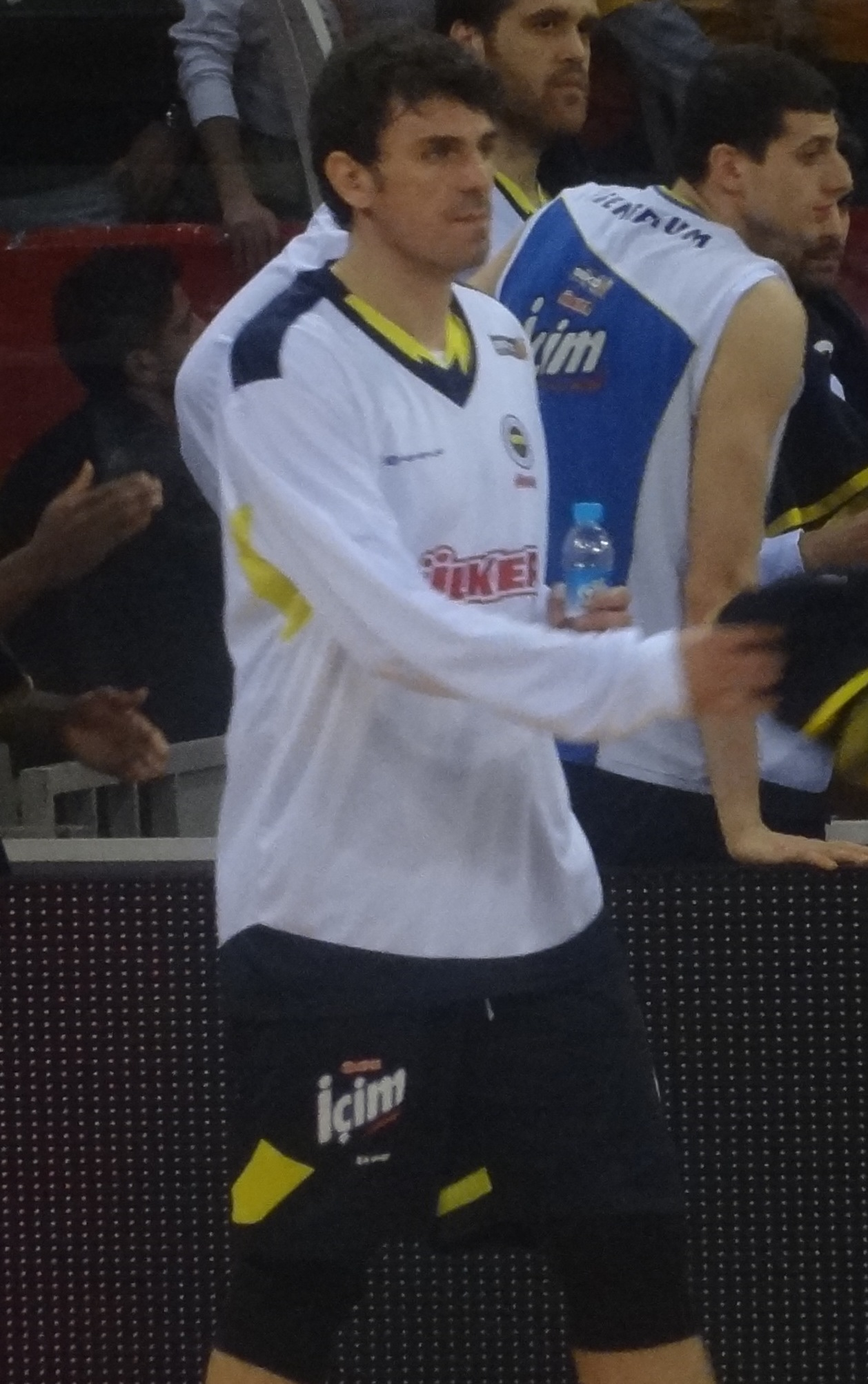
Mirsad Türkcan (2006-2012) He won the Turkish Basketball League 4 times (2007, 2008, 2010, 2011) and the Turkish Cup 2 times (2010, 2011) with Fenerbahçe and retired with his jersey in 2012

Fenerbahçe returned to the EuroLeague in 1992, but lost in the preliminary round. The club was back in the Turkish League finals in 1992, 1993, and 1995, but could not find a way to win the championship for some time. Fenerbahçe continued to have success in the late 90s. A third-place finish in the 1997–98 season allowed the club to return to the EuroLeague in 1998–99 season, and with players like Mahmoud Abdul-Rauf, Marko Milič, Žan Tabak, İbrahim Kutluay, and the late Conrad McRae, Fenerbahçe advanced to the eighth-final playoffs, losing there to Real Madrid. İbrahim Kutluay won the EuroLeague top scorer trophy with an average of 21.4 points.

The club made it to the Saporta Cup quarter-finals in 1994–95. The following season Fenerbahçe reached the quarter-finals of the Korać Cup in 1995–96 and repeated this achievement in 2000–01. The early 2000s, however, had very limited success. After Aydın Örs started as a coach in 2004, Fenerbahçe returned to the Turkish League semifinals and had a great return to European competitions, finishing in fourth place in the 2004–05 FIBA Europe League.

In the summer of 2006, the basketball club acquired a main sponsorship deal with Ülker, to form Fenerbahçe Ülker. After the sponsorship agreement, Fenerbahçe dominated the Turkish League and became the league champion two times in a row after 16 years and the team returned to the EuroLeague. After losing the Turkish League championship to Efes Pilsen in the 2008–09 season, in a closely contested playoff finals, Fenerbahçe became Turkish League champion again in the 2009–10 season, this time by defeating Efes Pilsen in the finals 4–2.

=== 2010s ===
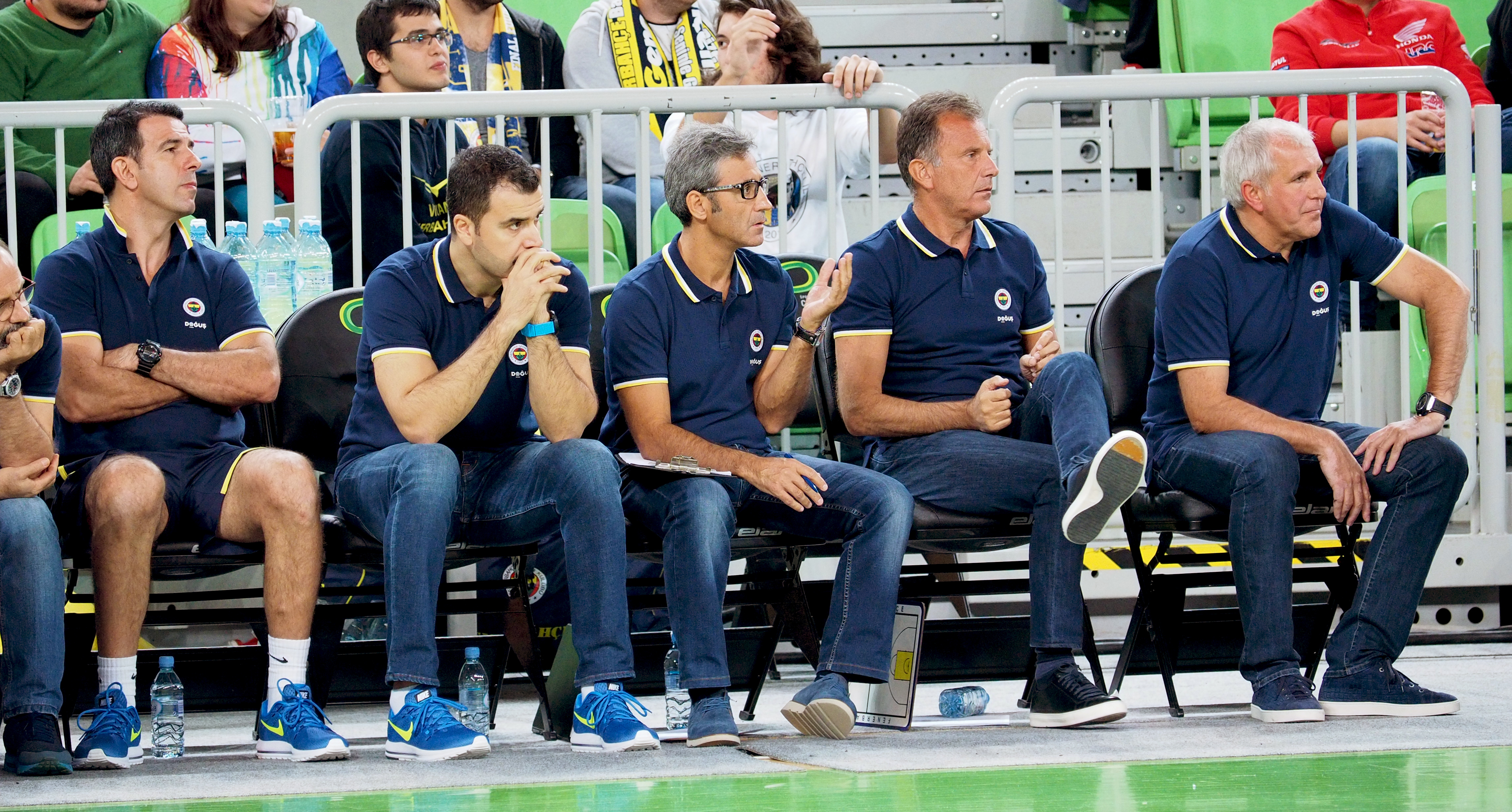
Fenerbahçe coaches, from left: İlker Belgutay (Athletic trainer), Erdem Can (Assistant coach), Josep Maria Izquierdo (Assistant coach), Vladimir Androić (Assistant coach) and Željko Obradović (Head coach), 2017

Fenerbahçe Ülker headed into the 2010–11 season with five new transfers: Engin Atsür, Šarūnas Jasikevičius, Marko Tomas, Kaya Peker, and Darjuš Lavrinovič. With new head coach Neven Spahija, Fenerbahçe Ülker continued its domination in the Turkish League, winning both the Turkish Cup and the Turkish League, over long time rivals Beşiktaş and Galatasaray, respectively.

After two disappointing seasons, in 2011–12 and 2012–13 where Fenerbahçe Ülker finished in fifth place in the Turkish league, legendary coach Željko Obradović was signed as the team's head coach, and the roster was strengthened with the likes of former Toronto Raptor Linas Kleiza, promising power forward Nemanja Bjelica, consistent center Luka Žorić, and hot Turkish prospects Kenan Sipahi and Melih Mahmutoğlu. Fenerbahçe became the Turkish League champion once again, after beating eternal rivals Galatasaray in the playoff's finals of the 2013–14 season. Success in the EuroLeague, however, continued to elude the team.

==== Golden age with Obradović ====
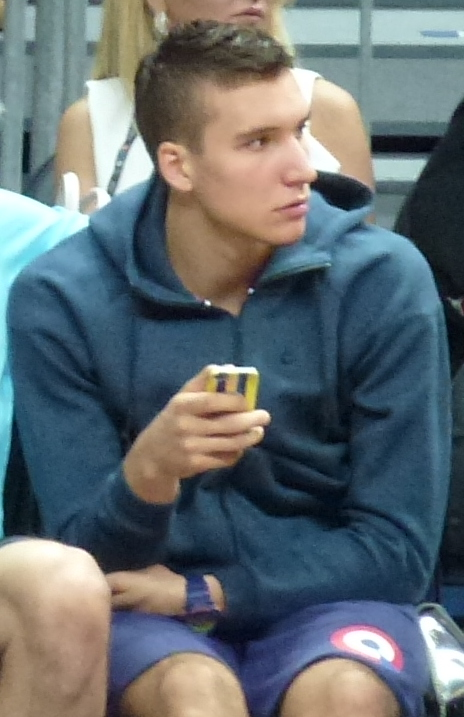
Bogdan Bogdanović (2014–17); won the EuroLeague (2017), the Turkish Basketball League 2 times (2016, 2017) the Turkish Cup (2016) and the Turkish Super Cup (2016) with Fenerbahçe

In the 2014–15 season, Fenerbahçe reached the EuroLeague Final Four for the first time in its history. In the quarterfinals, Fenerbahçe knocked out Maccabi Tel Aviv with three straight wins. In the semifinals, the team lost to Real Madrid, and eventually finished fourth. At the end of the season, the club's sponsorship agreement with Ülker ended. In the 2015–16 season, Fenerbahçe impressed in the EuroLeague Regular Season and Top 16, and qualified once again for the Final Four tournament, by eliminating the defending champion, Real Madrid, in the playoffs, again with a score of 3–0. During their first Final Four match against Laboral Kutxa, Fenerbahçe faced risking elimination once again before Kostas Sloukas made a game-tying lay-up to force the game into overtime, where Bogdan Bogdanović would help lead the team in overtime to win 88–77. The club became the first Turkish team to make it to the EuroLeague Final game. Its final opponent in the EuroLeague competition was CSKA Moscow. Fenerbahçe lost 101–96 after overtime.

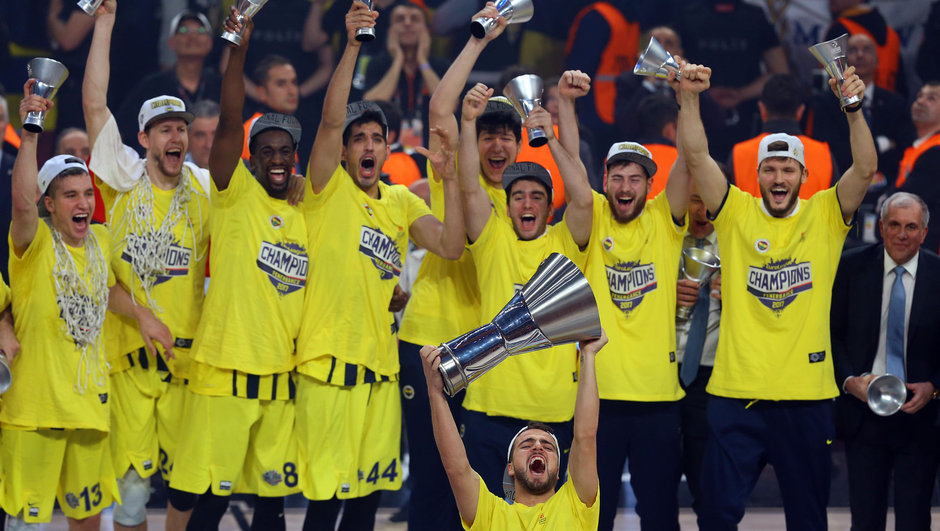
The team that won the 2016–17 EuroLeague title at the cup ceremony

In the following 2016–17 season, Fenerbahçe won its first European championship. The club beat Greek powerhouse Olympiacos 80–64 in the championship game of the Final Four, that was held in Istanbul. Fenerbahçe became the first and only Turkish team to win the EuroLeague title. Center Ekpe Udoh was named EuroLeague Final Four MVP. Following their European title, Fenerbahçe acquired a new main sponsor in the 2017 off-season. Doğuş Group signed a three-year contract with the club worth €45 million, which guaranteed the club the largest name sponsorship deal in European basketball history.

In the 2017–18 season, Fenerbahçe finished second in the regular season of the EuroLeague. In the Playoffs, they faced off against Kirolbet Baskonia, which it eliminated with 3–1 in the best-of-five series. Thus the club managed to reach the EuroLeague Final Four for the fourth time in a row, improving its record. The team eventually lost against Real Madrid in the championship final. Fenerbahçe also continued its domination of the Turkish Super League – after a setback in 2015, Fenerbahçe won the 2016, 2017, and 2018 championships in dominating fashion.

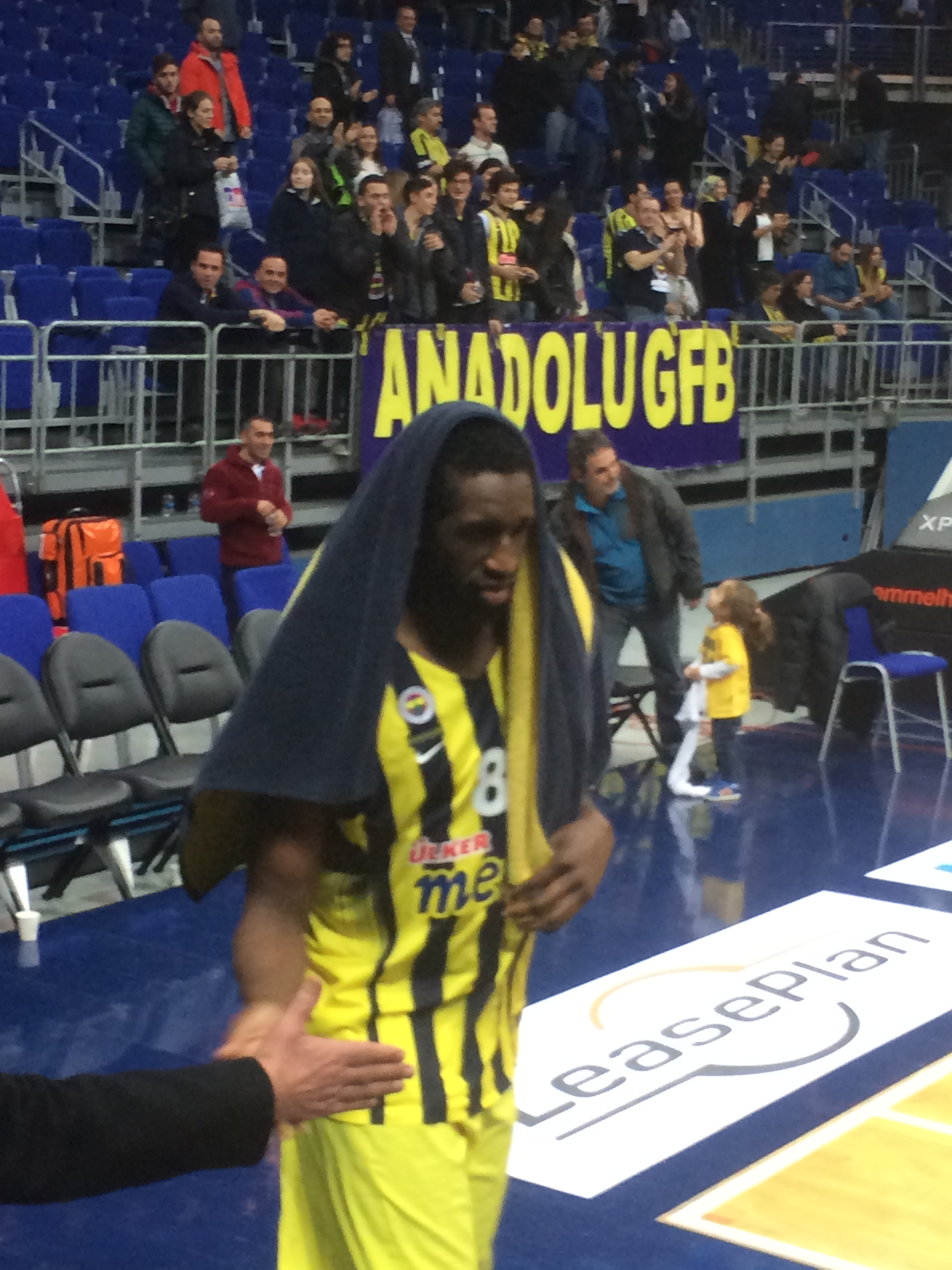
Ekpe Udoh (2015–17) MVP of 2017 Final-Four; won the EuroLeague (2017) the Turkish Basketball League 2 times (2016 and 2017) the Turkish Cup (2016) with Fenerbahçe

Before the beginning of the 2018–19 season, Doğuş withdrew from the sponsorship deal which had been projected for three years. Following the unexpected retraction, a new main sponsorship agreement with Beko was initiated. During the 2018–19 season, Fenerbahçe became the only team to stay undefeated at home after a 30-game regular season and secured the best record after a regular season (25–5) under the new EuroLeague format (2016–17 season to present). Fener also became the earliest EuroLeague Playoffs qualifier in the modern EuroLeague era. Domestically, the Yellow-Navy Blues defeated rival Anadolu Efes in the 2019 Turkish Cup final to claim its sixth title. Fenerbahçe defeated BC Žalgiris, 3–1, in the EuroLeague quarterfinals, qualifying for its fifth consecutive Final Four. In the EuroLeague Final Four, however, Fenerbahçe was beaten by Anadolu Efes in the semifinals, and Real Madrid in the third place game, finishing in a disappointing fourth place. In the Turkish Super League, Fenerbahçe once again made the finals – however, in an upset, it was again defeated by Anadolu Efes in a seven-game series.

The 2019–2020 season was the last under Obradović. Fenerbahçe managed to win the 2020 Turkish Cup by beating Teksüt Bandırma in the quarterfinals, Türk Telekom in the semifinals, and Darüşşafaka in the finals. Despite improving its roster with signings like Derrick Williams and Nando De Colo, Fenerbahçe struggled in the EuroLeague – at the time the season was stopped due to the coronavirus pandemic, Fenerbahçe was fighting for the final playoff spot, and in the Turkish Super League, Fenerbahçe was just 4th – behind Anadolu Efes, Pınar Karşıyaka and Galatasaray. Both tournaments were cancelled with no champions. In the summer, coach Obradović resigned.

=== 2020s ===
Fenerbahçe signed former Phoenix Suns head coach Igor Kokoškov to replace Obradović. Fenerbahçe underwent many changes during the post season, though managed to keep top players like Vesely and De Colo on the roster. The team struggled greatly in the EuroLeague, suffering many embarrassing blowout loses in the beginning, and fell quickly behind Anadolu Efes in the Turkish Super League standings, but with the late season signing of Marko Gudurić, the team greatly improved. A winning streak in the EuroLeague helped Fenerbahçe make the EuroLeague playoffs with a 20–14 record and 7th place in the regular season. In the playoffs, Fenerbahçe was swept by CSKA Moscow. In the Turkish Super League, Fenerbahçe returned to the finals and faced the 2021 EuroLeague champions Anadolu Efes, who easily swept Fenerbahçe in the finals. Despite signing a long-term contract, Kokoškov left Fenerbahçe during the summer.

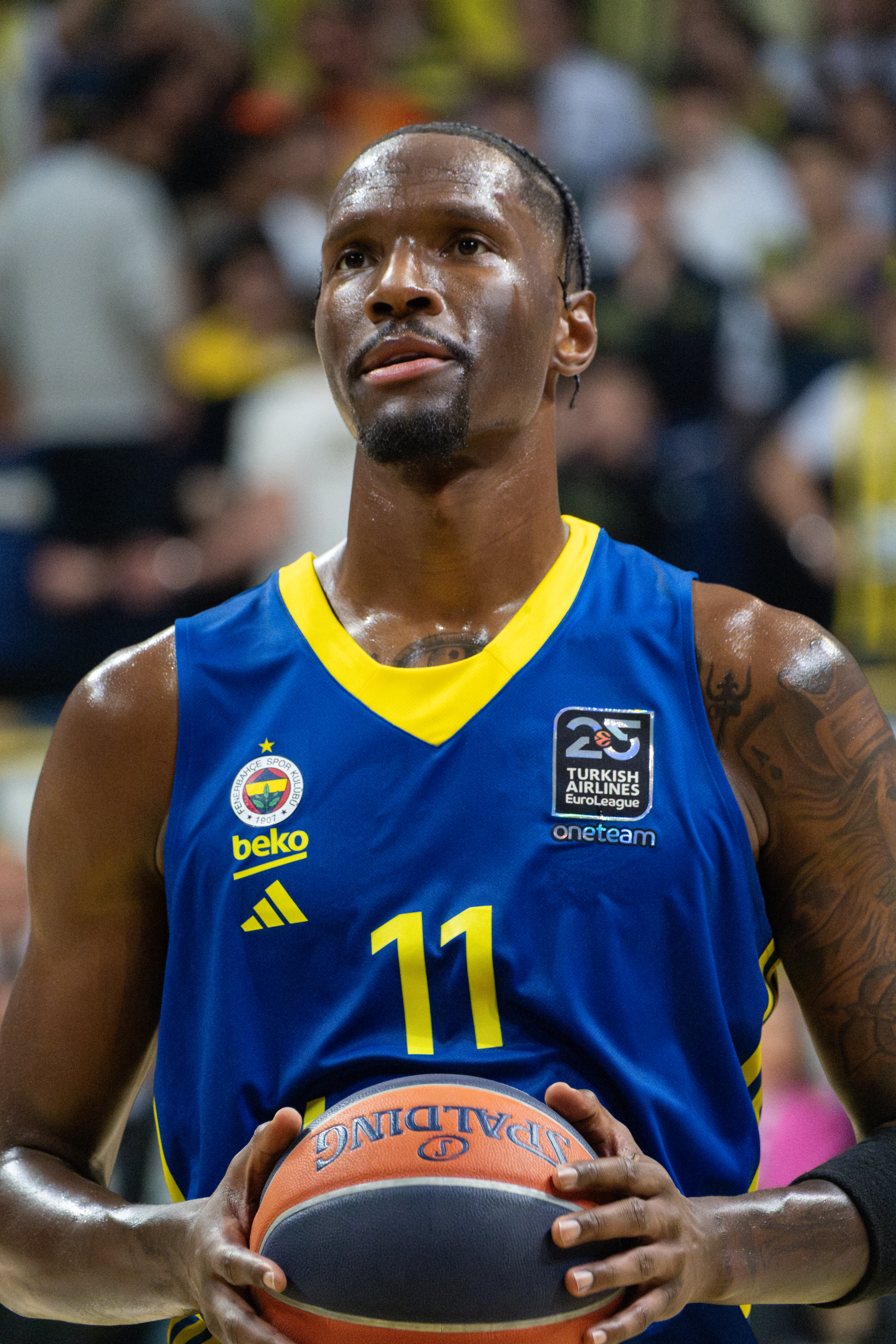
Nigel Hayes-Davis (2022–25) He is MVP of 2025 Final-Four and won the EuroLeague 1 times (2025) the Turkish Basketball League 2 times (2024 and 2025) and the Turkish Cup 2 times (2024 and 2025) with Fenerbahçe

During the off-season, Fenerbahçe signed Saša Đorđević as its new head coach. Fenerbahçe had higher expectations for the season than the previous year. In the EuroLeague, Fenerbahçe struggled, and for the first time since the 2013–2014 season, failed to make the playoffs – finishing in a disappointing 12th place, and coach Đorđević suffered much criticism. Anadolu Efes repeated as the 2022 EuroLeague champions. In the re-established Turkish Cup, Fenerbahçe was beaten by Anadolu Efes. In the Turkish Super League, Fenerbahçe got their revenge – they finished over Efes in the regular season standings, earning home-court advantage for the playoffs, and made the finals – in the finals, Fenerbahçe beat Anadolu Efes 3–1 to win the championship, their record breaking 10th Turkish League championship. Dimitris Itoudis replaced Đorđević during the summer, with a long-term contract with Fenerbahçe.

Under Itoudis, Fenerbahçe returned to the playoffs in the EuroLeague, with a 18-16 record, and took the first place Olympiakos to a full distance, going all five games before Olympiakos defeated Fenerbahçe. In the first match of the semi-finals of the 2022-23 Turkish Basketball Super League Play-Offs, Fenerbahçe defeated Anadolu Efes by 108–66, with a difference of 42 points. With this result, Fenerbahçe broke new record in its fierce rivalry against Efes. The yellow-navy blue team achieved its biggest victory in all the matches it played against its opponent in history, with a difference of 42 points. In addition, this result was the most different defeat suffered by Anadolu Efes in a Basketball Super League match. However, Efes rebounded and shocked Fenerbahçe with a 3–1 win in the semifinals – a disaster for Fenerbahçe.

Šarūnas Jasikevičius, who became a champion both during his time as a coach and during his time playing basketball at Fenerbahçe

The disappointing results under Itoudis continued into the next year for Fenerbahçe - Fenerbahçe struggled in both the EuroLeague and the Turkish League. On December 14, 2023, Fenerbahçe fired Itoudis, and brought in Šarūnas Jasikevičius as the new head coach. Fenerbahçe won the Turkish Basketball Cup for the 8th time in the 2023–24 season by defeating Anadolu Efes 67–80 in the Turkish Basketball Cup final. Under Jasikevičius, Fenerbahçe once again participated in the Final Four after a 3-year hiatus - while finishing only fourth, the seeds were planted for a better run in the next few years. During the season, Nigel Hayes-Davis broke the record for most points scored in a EuroLeague game by scoring 50 points against Alba Berlin. Fenerbahçe, which successfully completed the Play-Offs in the 2023–24 Turkish Basketball League, faced Anadolu Efes in the finals and won the final games 3–1, winning its 11th Championship.

In the 2024–25 season, Fenerbahçe defeated Beşiktaş 104–81 in the Turkish Basketball Cup final and took the Turkish Basketball Cup to its museum for the 9th time. It qualified for the 2024 EuroLeague Final Four for the sixth time in the 2023–24 season, but bowed out in the semi-finals.

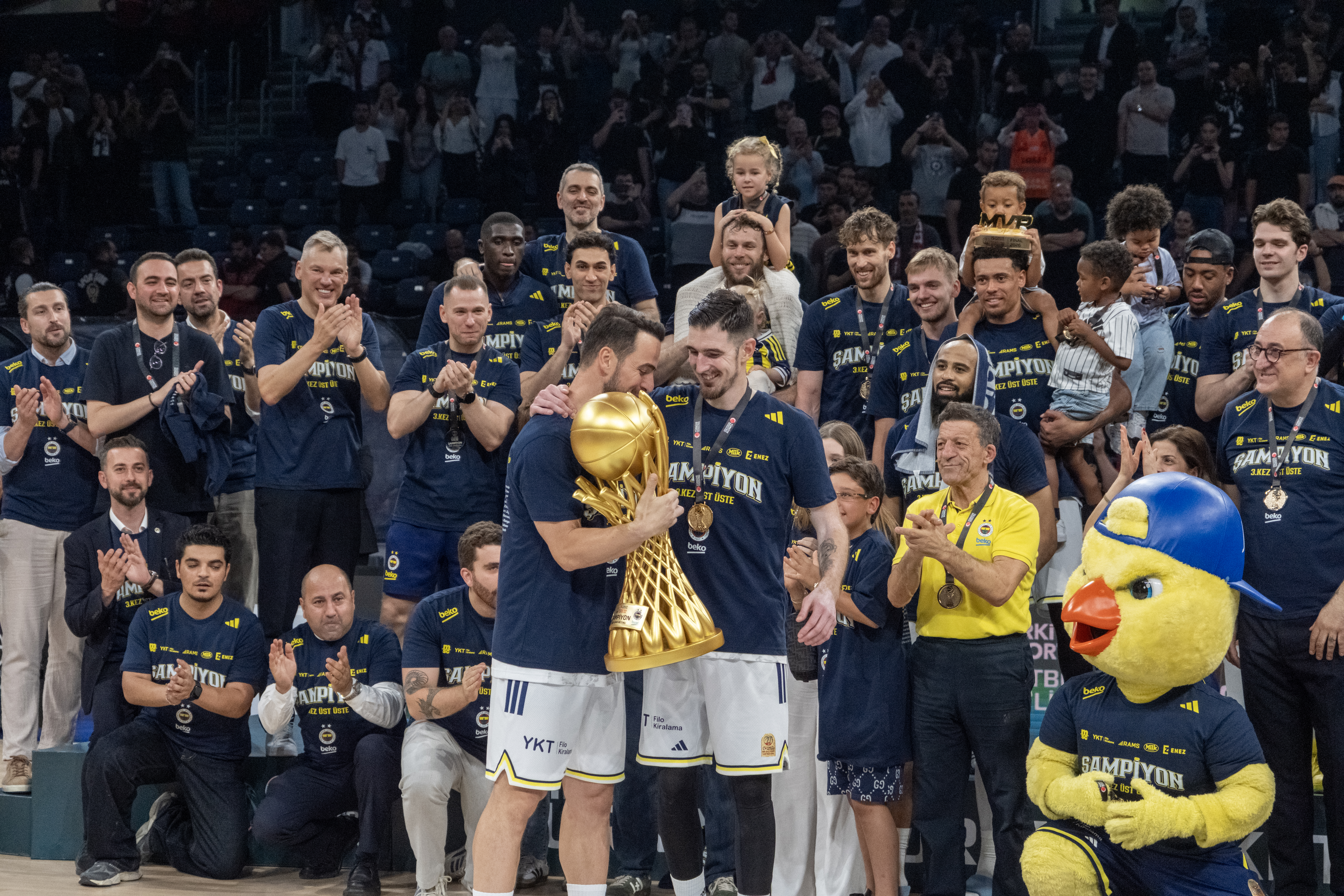
Nando de Colo lifts the trophy during Fenerbahçe's 16th Turkish Championship title (2025-26)

The club finished the 2024–25 EuroLeague regular season in second place, beat Paris 3–0 in the Play-Off qualifiers, qualified for the Final Four held in Abu Dhabi, and beat Panathinaikos 82–76 in the semi-finals, making it to the EuroLeague finals for the fourth time, winning it against Monaco 81–70 and winning the EuroLeague for the second time. Fenerbahçe, which completed the 2024–25 season as the EuroLeague champion, defeated rivals Beşiktaş 4–1 in the Turkish Super League final series and declared its 15th championship. Fener thus completed the 2024–25 season with a historic Triple Crown (Turkish Cup, Turkish Super League and EuroLeague championship), becoming the first Turkish team to achieve this feat. Fenerbahçe, which did not renew the contracts of Errick McCollum, Marko Gudurić, Dyshawn Pierre and Sertaç Şanlı, whose contracts expired at the end of the 2024–25 season, has begun restructuring its new squad. Before the start of the 2025–26 season, Fener signed Mikael Jantunen, who had a strong performance for the Finnish national team at the EuroBasket 2025, as well as Brandon Boston Jr., Armando Bacot, and Talen Horton-Tucker from the NBA. Fener also re-signed Onuralp Bitim, who was loaned to Bayern Munich at the beginning of the 2024–25 season. Fenerbahçe beat Beşiktaş 85–83 to lift the 38th edition of the President's Cup, which serves as the Turkish Supercup, on 24 September. The reigning EuroLeague champions, who captured the triple crown last season and also won the Turkish League and Turkish Cup titles, lifted their fourth trophy of the calendar year. Thus, it achieved a significant success by winning trophies in 4 tournaments in one season.

== International record ==
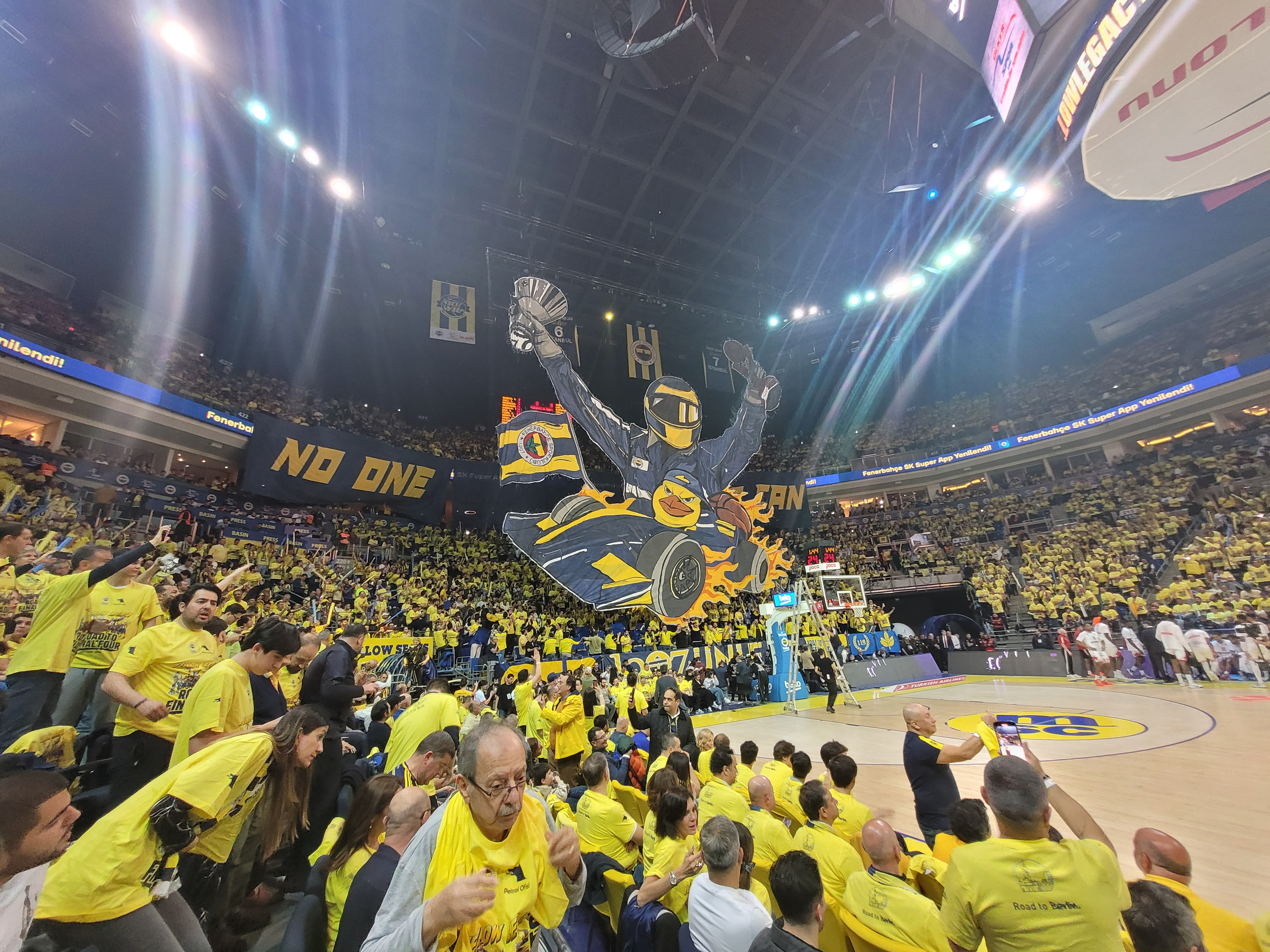
^{Choreography event prepared by fans at Ülker Arena before the AS Monaco match (2024 EuroLeague 8 Play-Offs)}

Fenerbahçe participated in European competitions numerous times throughout their history and became one of the most successful Turkish clubs ever. By winning the former Turkish Basketball Championship, the club represented Turkey for their first time in the FIBA European Champions Cup in 1959–60 and again in 1965–66. Some years later, they made it to the FIBA European Cup quarter-finals in the 1994–95 season. The following season Fenerbahçe reached the quarter-finals of the FIBA Korać Cup in 1996 and repeated this achievement in 2001. In the 1998–99 season of the FIBA EuroLeague, they reached the Top 16 stage, but lost there to Real Madrid. The club became fourth in the 2004–05 season of the FIBA EuroChallenge. The first major success in the modern era EuroLeague was achieved in the 2007–08 season, where Fenerbahçe reached the quarter-finals. The first Final Four participation in the history of the club followed some years later, in the 2014–15 season, when the team eliminated reigning European champions Maccabi Tel Aviv in the play-offs with three straight victories under the guidance of legendary coach Željko Obradović. In the semi-final game they lost against Real Madrid and eventually finished fourth. In the next season, the club reached the final of the competition with a convincing overall performance, again by eliminating the reigning champions (Real Madrid) with three straight wins, and lost dramatically against CSKA Moscow in overtime. Then eventually, in 2017, Fenerbahçe managed to win the EuroLeague trophy as the first and only Turkish club ever, in their own city, by defeating Greek team Olympiacos in the final game with a score of 80–64. From the quarter-finals onwards, the club eliminated their opponents in dominating fashion, first sweeping Greek team Panathinaikos with 3–0 wins despite the home-court disadvantage, and then defeating European powerhouses Real Madrid and Olympiacos with being behind only for a few seconds in total in the Final Four in Istanbul. Fenerbahçe, which finished the 2024–25 EuroLeague regular season in second place, beat Paris 3–0 in the Play-Off qualifiers, qualified for the Final Four held in Abu Dhabi, and beat Panathinaikos 82–76 in the semi-finals, making it to the EuroLeague finals for the fourth time, winning it against Monaco 81–70 and winning the EuroLeague for the "second" time.

=== Statistics in European competitions ===
Competition	Participation	Years
FIBA European Champions Cup / EuroLeague	24	1959–60, 1965–66, 1991–92, 1998–99, 2006–07, 2007–08, 2008–09, 2009–10, 2010–11, 2011–12, 2012–13, 2013–14, 2014–15, 2015–16, 2016–17, 2017–18, 2018–19, 2019–20, 2020–21, 2021–22, 2022–23, 2023–24, 2024–25, 2025–26
FIBA European Cup Winners' Cup / FIBA European Cup / FIBA EuroCup / FIBA Saporta Cup	8	1967–68, 1983–84, 1985–86, 1991–92, 1994–95, 1996–97, 1997–98, 1999–00
FIBA Korać Cup	9	1984–85, 1988–89, 1989–90, 1990–91, 1992–93, 1993–94, 1995–96, 2000–01, 2001–02
FIBA Europe League / FIBA EuroCup / FIBA EuroChallenge	2	2004–05, 2005–06
FIBA Europe Cup / FIBA EuroCup Challenge	1	2003–04
North European Basketball League	1	2001–02

Competition (as of 25 May 2025)	Pld	W	L	PF	PA	PD	PCT	Best achievements
EuroLeague (1st tier)	545	311	234	42906	42179	+727	0.57	Champion 2016–17, 2024–25
FIBA Saporta Cup (2nd tier)	58	29	29	4636	4572	+64	0.5	Quarter-Finalist 1994–95
FIBA Korać Cup (3rd tier)	64	35	29	5225	5091	+134	0.55	Quarter-Finalist 1995–96, 2000–01
FIBA EuroChallenge (3rd tier)	31	22	9	2550	2346	+204	0.71	Fourth Place 2004–05
FIBA EuroCup Challenge (4th tier)	9	6	3	797	706	+91	0.67	Conference South Third Place (top-16) 2003–04
North European Basketball League (regional)	14	7	7	1142	1153	–11	0.5	Second Round (top-16) 2001–02
Total	721	410	311	57256	56047	+1209	0.57	

Pld = Matches played; W = Matches won; L = Matches lost; PF = Points for; PA = Points against; PD = Point Difference; PCT = Winning percentage.

=== By team and by country ===
As of 25 May 2025

Country	Club	Pld	W	L	PF	PA	PD
Austria	SKN St. Pölten	2	1	1	210	148	+62
Subtotal		2	1	1	210	148	+62
Belgium	Antwerp Giants	2	2	0	159	126	+33
Belgium	Leuven Bears	2	2	0	189	173	+16
Belgium	RBC Pepinster	2	1	1	142	155	−13
Belgium	Spirou Charleroi	2	1	1	150	150	0
Subtotal		8	6	2	640	604	+36
Bosnia and Herzegovina	Bosna (Socialist Federal Republic of Yugoslavia)	2	0	2	154	178	−24
Bosnia and Herzegovina	Igokea	2	1	1	148	143	+5
Subtotal		4	1	3	302	321	−19
Bulgaria	CSKA Sofia	2	2	0	176	142	+34
Bulgaria	Levski Sofia	3	2	1	254	225	+29
Bulgaria	Yambol	1	0	1	71	91	−20
Bulgaria	Academic	3	1	2	189	205	−16
Subtotal		9	5	4	690	663	+27
Croatia	Cedevita Junior	2	1	1	145	162	−17
Croatia	Cibona	8	5	3	596	567	+29
Croatia	Zagreb	2	1	1	143	147	−4
Subtotal		12	7	5	884	876	+8
Cyprus	AEL Limassol	2	1	1	167	163	+4
Cyprus	Keravnos	1	1	0	99	94	+5
Subtotal		3	2	1	266	257	+9
Czech Republic	Basketball Nymburk	4	2	2	319	331	−12
Czech Republic	Sparta Praha	2	1	1	182	152	+30
Czech Republic	BK Opava	2	1	1	150	138	+12
Subtotal		8	4	4	651	621	+30
Estonia	Kalev	2	2	0	172	140	+32
Subtotal		2	2	0	172	140	+32
France	Monaco	14	8	6	1169	1181	−12
France	ASVEL	16	12	4	1281	1178	+103
France	Cholet	2	1	1	171	143	+28
France	Chorale Roanne	2	2	0	178	158	+20
France	Élan Béarnais Pau-Lacq-Orthez	4	1	3	259	301	−42
France	JDA Dijon	2	2	0	163	137	+26
France	Le Mans	2	1	1	175	173	+2
France	Nanterre 92	2	2	0	178	142	+36
France	Paris Basketball	5	5	0	458	421	+37
France	SIG Strasbourg	2	1	1	151	155	−4
France	SLUC Nancy Basket	2	2	0	163	139	+24
France	Stade Français	2	0	2	177	215	−38
Subtotal		55	37	18	4523	4343	+180
Georgia	Merani Tbilisi	2	2	0	211	146	+65
Subtotal		2	2	0	211	146	+65
Germany	Alba Berlin	16	10	6	1333	1276	+57
Germany	Brose Bamberg	6	5	1	459	428	+31
Germany	Bayern Munich	17	14	3	1397	1291	+106
Subtotal		39	29	10	3189	2995	+194
Greece	Aris	4	1	3	293	300	−7
Greece	Olympiacos	34	17	17	2613	2651	−38
Greece	Panathinaikos	34	16	18	2561	2529	+32
Greece	Panionios	2	1	1	173	173	0
Greece	PAOK	2	2	0	189	175	+14
Greece	Sporting	2	1	1	188	184	+4
Subtotal		78	38	40	6017	6012	+5
Hungary	PVSK Panthers	2	2	0	134	111	+23
Hungary	ZTE KK	2	1	1	152	139	+13
Subtotal		4	3	1	286	250	+36
Israel	Hapoel Galil Elyon	5	4	1	429	373	+56
Israel	Hapoel Jerusalem	2	1	1	147	148	−1
Israel	Hapoel Tel Aviv	5	4	1	394	364	+30
Israel	Maccabi Rishon LeZion	2	2	0	165	154	+11
Israel	Maccabi Tel Aviv	25	14	11	1860	1792	+68
Subtotal		39	25	14	2995	2831	+164
Italy	Mens Sana 1871 Basket	10	1	9	726	854	−128
Italy	Napoli Basket	2	1	1	171	171	0
Italy	Olimpia Milano	30	17	13	2422	2397	+25
Italy	Cantù	6	4	2	456	469	−13
Italy	Treviso	4	2	2	319	320	−1
Italy	Trieste	2	0	2	159	168	−9
Italy	Varese	2	1	1	172	167	+5
Italy	Victoria Libertas	2	1	1	151	145	+6
Italy	Virtus Bologna	8	4	4	640	652	−12
Italy	Virtus Roma	4	3	1	326	291	+35
Subtotal		70	34	36	5542	5634	−92
Latvia	BK Brocēni	4	3	1	328	312	+16
Latvia	BK Ventspils	4	0	4	313	335	−22
Latvia	Rīgas ASK	2	2	0	203	172	+31
Subtotal		10	5	5	844	819	+25
Lithuania	Rytas	4	3	1	346	320	+26
Lithuania	Žalgiris	30	20	10	2378	2258	+120
Subtotal		34	23	11	2724	2578	+146
Montenegro	Budućnost	2	2	0	165	132	+33
Subtotal		2	2	0	165	132	+33
Netherlands	Amsterdam Basketball	2	1	1	152	162	−10
Subtotal		2	1	1	152	162	−10
North Macedonia	Kumanovo	1	1	0	77	71	+6
North Macedonia	Rabotnički	7	5	2	609	507	+102
Subtotal		8	6	2	686	578	+108
Poland	Włocławek	4	3	1	376	354	+22
Poland	Śląsk Wrocław	4	0	4	292	319	−27
Poland	Turów Zgorzelec	2	2	0	180	150	+30
Subtotal		10	5	5	848	823	+25
Romania	Progresul Pecica	1	1	0	85	60	+25
Romania	BC Timișoara	2	2	0	222	123	+99
Romania	Steaua București	2	1	1	146	150	−4
Romania	Dinamo București	2	1	1	143	146	−3
Romania	CSU Ploiești	2	2	0	193	139	+54
Subtotal		9	7	2	789	618	+171
Russia	Avtodor	2	2	0	168	159	+9
Russia	Dynamo Saint Petersburg	2	1	1	154	154	0
Russia	Euras	2	1	1	140	148	−8
Russia	Khimki	15	10	5	1222	1174	+48
Russia	Nizhny Novgorod	2	2	0	170	139	+31
Russia	UNICS	6	3	3	474	463	+11
Russia	Zenit Saint Petersburg	4	3	1	319	301	+18
Russia	CSKA Moscow	24	9	15	1870	1957	−87
Russia	Lokomotiv Kuban	2	2	0	140	131	+9
Subtotal		59	33	26	4657	4626	+31
Serbia	Borac Čačak (Socialist Federal Republic of Yugoslavia)	2	1	1	178	171	+7
Serbia	Crvena zvezda (Serbia) (Federal Republic of Yugoslavia) (Socialist Federal Republic of Yugoslavia)	24	14	10	1791	1759	+32
Serbia	Partizan	10	5	5	841	810	+31
Serbia	Vojvodina Srbijagas (Federal Republic of Yugoslavia)	3	2	1	270	253	+17
Serbia	Vršac (Federal Republic of Yugoslavia)	2	1	1	140	131	+9
Subtotal		41	23	18	3220	3124	+96
Slovakia	Iskra Svit (Czechoslovakia)	2	1	1	170	175	−5
Subtotal		2	1	1	170	175	−5
Slovenia	Hopsi Polzela	2	1	1	170	170	0
Slovenia	Olimpija	4	4	0	345	300	+45
Slovenia	Zlatorog Laško	2	1	1	152	153	−1
Slovenia	ZM Maribor Lumar	2	2	0	155	143	+12
Subtotal		10	8	2	822	766	+56
Spain	Málaga	8	4	4	595	576	+19
Spain	Manresa	2	1	1	138	137	+1
Spain	Bilbao	2	1	1	143	150	−7
Spain	Estudiantes	2	2	0	183	165	+18
Spain	Gran Canaria	2	2	0	179	136	+43
Spain	Zaragoza	2	2	0	147	143	+4
Spain	Joventut Badalona	4	3	1	309	292	+17
Spain	Barcelona	36	12	24	2637	2938	−301
Spain	Real Madrid	33	13	20	2527	2644	−117
Spain	Saski Baskonia	39	18	21	3106	3156	−50
Spain	Valencia	12	6	6	982	954	+28
Subtotal		142	64	78	10946	11291	−345
Sweden	Gothia Basket	2	1	1	160	157	+3
Sweden	Norrköping Dolphins	2	1	1	189	178	+11
Subtotal		4	2	2	349	335	+14
Turkey	Anadolu Efes	26	17	9	2116	2058	+58
Turkey	Beşiktaş	5	3	2	378	373	+5
Turkey	Darüşşafaka	6	4	2	509	466	+43
Turkey	Galatasaray	2	2	0	188	167	+21
Turkey	Tuborg Pilsener	1	0	1	67	84	−17
Turkey	Türk Telekom	2	2	0	151	137	+14
Subtotal		42	28	14	3409	3285	+124
Ukraine	Budivelnyk (Ukraine) (Soviet Union)	4	2	2	332	325	+7
Ukraine	Kyiv	5	3	2	400	384	+16
Ukraine	Odesa	2	1	1	165	185	−20
Subtotal		11	6	5	897	894	+3
Total		721	410	311	57256	56047	+1209

=== EuroLeague Finals ===
On 15 May 2016, Fenerbahçe became the first Turkish basketball club to play EuroLeague final and on 21 May 2017, became the first Turkish basketball club to won EuroLeague.

15 May 2016
20:00 (CEST)

Report

Fenerbahçe (Turkey)	96–101 (OT)	(Russia) CSKA Moscow
Scoring by quarter: 20–22, 10–28, 23–19, 30–14, Overtime: 13–18
Pts: Dixon 17; Rebs: Udoh 11; Asts: Dixon 4		Pts: De Colo 22; Rebs: Khryapa, Teodosić 5 Asts: De Colo, Teodosić 7

Mercedes-Benz Arena
Attendance: 12,250
Referees: Luigi Lamonica (ITA), Robert Lottermoser (GER), Damir Javor (SLO)

21 May 2017
20:00 (CEST)

Report

Fenerbahçe (Turkey)	80–64	(Greece) Olympiacos
Scoring by quarter: 26–18, 13–16, 21–14, 20–16
Pts: Bogdanović, Kalinić 17; Rebs: Udoh 9 Asts: Kalinić, Sloukas 5		Pts: Birch 14; Rebs: Papanikolaou 5 Asts: Spanoulis 8

Sinan Erdem Dome
Attendance: 15,671
Referees: Daniel Hierrezuelo (ESP), Borys Rhyzhyk (UKR), Oļegs Latiševs (LAT)

20 May 2018
20:00 UTC+02:00

Report

Real Madrid (Spain)	85–80	(Turkey) Fenerbahçe Doğuş
Scoring by quarter: 21–17, 17–23, 25–15, 22–25
Pts: Causeur 17; Rebs: three players 5 Asts: Dončić 4		Pts: Melli 28; Rebs: Melli 6 Asts: Wanamaker 5

Štark Arena
Attendance: 16,967
Referees: Luigi Lamonica (ITA), Borys Ryzhyk (UKR), Oļegs Latiševs (LAT)

25 May 2025
19:00 (CEST)

Report

Monaco (French Federation of Basketball)	70–81	(Turkish Basketball Federation) Fenerbahçe Beko
Scoring by quarter: 20–18, 13–17, 18–19, 19–27
Pts: Diallo 19; Rebs: Theis 8 Asts: Okobo 5		Pts: Hayes-Davis 23; Rebs: Hayes-Davis 9 Asts: Baldwin 3

Etihad Arena
Referees: Carlos Peruga (ESP), Robert Lottermoser (GER), Milan Nedović (SLO)

== Matches against NBA teams ==
On 5 October 2012, Fenerbahçe became the first and only Turkish basketball club to win against an NBA team, having beaten the Boston Celtics by a score of 97–91 at the Ülker Sports Arena. By defeating the Brooklyn Nets 101–96 in Barclays Center on 5 October 2015, Fenerbahçe became the first and only Turkish basketball club and only third club in basketball history to win against an NBA team in the United States.

NBA TV

5 October 2012
19:00 CET

Report

Boston Celtics (United States)	91–97	(Turkey) Fenerbahçe Ülker
Scoring by quarter: 27–26, 18–29, 27–24, 19–18
Pts: Green, Sullinger 22; Rebs: Sullinger 8 Asts: Rondo 9		Pts: Sato 24; Rebs: Sato, Ilkan 7 Asts: McCalebb 5

Ülker Sports Arena
Attendance: 12,191
Referees: David Guthrie (USA), John Goble (USA), Sasa Pukl (SLO)

5 October 2013
14:00 CET

Report

Oklahoma City Thunder (United States)	95–82	(Turkey) Fenerbahçe Ülker
Scoring by quarter: 20–28, 28–14, 27–23, 20–17
Pts: Durant 24; Rebs: Durant 8 Asts: Jackson 5		Pts: Bogdanović 19; Rebs: Bogdanović, Vidmar, Kleiza 4 Asts: Preldžić 4

Ülker Sports Arena
Attendance: 12,191
Referees: Dan Crawford (USA), Courtney Kirkland (USA), Rüştü Nuran (TUR)

11 October 2014
17:00 CET

Report

San Antonio Spurs (United States)	96–90	(Turkey) Fenerbahçe Ülker
Scoring by quarter: 29–21, 18–19, 28–30, 21–20
Pts: Duncan 23; Rebs: Ginóbili 8 Asts: Parker 7		Pts: Goudelock 30; Rebs: Žorić 7 Asts: Preldžić 11

Ülker Sports Arena
Attendance: 12,191
Referees: Tony Brothers (USA), Matej Boltauzer (SLO), Haywoode Workman (USA)

5 October 2015
02:30 CET

Report

Fenerbahçe (Turkey)	101–96	(United States) Brooklyn Nets
Scoring by quarter: 25–26, 31–26, 26–20, 19–24
Pts: Veselý 18; Rebs: Udoh 8 Asts: Sloukas 11		Pts: Lopez 18; Rebs: Robinson 16; Asts: Larkin 5

Barclays Center
Attendance: 6,857
Referees: Ken Mauer (USA), Nick Buchert (USA), Violet Palmer (USA)

9 October 2015
03:00 CET

Report

Fenerbahçe (Turkey)	81–111	(United States) Oklahoma City Thunder
Scoring by quarter: 21–32, 20–26, 17–29, 23–24
Pts: Veselý 17; Rebs: Udoh 9 Asts: Sloukas 6		Pts: Waiters 19; Rebs: Adams 8 Asts: Durant, Westbrook 5

Chesapeake Energy Arena
Referees: Kevin Cutler (USA), Dan Crawford (USA), Scott Wall (USA)

== Players ==
=== Current roster ===
Note: Flags indicate national team eligibility at FIBA-sanctioned events. Players may hold other non-FIBA nationalities not displayed.

Fenerbahçe Tarfin roster
Players
Coaches

Pos.	No.	Nat.	Name	Ht.	Wt.	Age
G	0	(Turkey)	Larkin, Shane	1.82 m (6 ft 0 in)	79 kg (174 lb)	34 – 2 October 1992
C	1	(United States)	Bingham Jr., Marcus	2.12 m (6 ft 11 in)	104 kg (229 lb)	26 – 14 July 2000
PG	2	(United States)	Baldwin IV, Wade	1.93 m (6 ft 4 in)	91 kg (201 lb)	30 – 29 March 1996
PF	4	(Italy)	Melli, Nicolò	2.05 m (6 ft 9 in)	110 kg (243 lb)	35 – 26 January 1991
C	5	(Turkey)	Şanlı, Sertaç	2.14 m (7 ft 0 in)	115 kg (254 lb)	35 – 5 August 1991
SG	8	(United States)	Horton-Tucker, Talen	1.93 m (6 ft 4 in)	106 kg (234 lb)	25 – 25 November 2000
G/F	9	(United States)	Juzang, Johnny	2.01 m (6 ft 7 in)	103 kg (227 lb)	25 – 17 March 2001
SG	10	(Turkey)	Mahmutoğlu, Melih (C)	1.91 m (6 ft 3 in)	85 kg (187 lb)	36 – 12 May 1990
PG	11	(United States)	Forrest, Trent	1.96 m (6 ft 5 in)	95 kg (209 lb)	28 – 12 June 1998
F	12	(United States)	Key, Braxton	2.04 m (6 ft 8 in)	102 kg (225 lb)	29 – 14 February 1997
F/C	14	(Turkey)	Yancı, Kadir Yiğit	2.00 m (6 ft 7 in)		21 – 30 October 2005
F/C	16	(Canada)	Powell, Dwight	2.11 m (6 ft 11 in)	109 kg (240 lb)	35 – 20 July 1991
SF	17	(Turkey)	Bitim, Onuralp	1.98 m (6 ft 6 in)	98 kg (216 lb)	27 – 31 March 1999
SF	21	(United States)	Clyburn, Will	2.01 m (6 ft 7 in)	95 kg (209 lb)	36 – 17 May 1990
SF	31	(Denmark)	Shields, Shavon	2.01 m (6 ft 7 in)	100 kg (220 lb)	32 – 5 June 1994
G	43	(Lithuania)	Sargiūnas, Ignas	1.96 m (6 ft 5 in)	86 kg (190 lb)	27 – 11 September 1999
G/F	77	(Turkey)	Demir, Demircan	1.98 m (6 ft 6 in)		22 – 15 June 2004

Head coach

- (Lithuania) Šarūnas Jasikevičius

Assistant coach(es)

- (Turkey) Ertuğrul Erdoğan
- (Lithuania) Kazys Maksvytis
- (Spain) David Garcia
- (Turkey) Alp Timuçin Yener

Athletic trainer(s)

- (Lithuania) Mantas Valčiukaitis
- (Turkey) İlker Belgutay

Physiotherapist(s)

- (Turkey) Rıza Özdemir
- (Spain) Jaime Capellá Bouza
- (Turkey) Ebru Kaplan

Team manager

- (Turkey) Cenk Renda

Legend

- (C) Team captain
- Injured

- Roster
Updated: 13 November 2026

=== EuroLeague Depth chart ===
Pos.	Starting 5	Bench 1	Bench 2	Bench 3
C	Marcus Bingham Jr.	Dwight Powell	Sertaç Şanlı
PF	Braxton Key	Nicolò Melli
SF	Shavon Shields	Will Clyburn	Johnny Juzang	Onuralp Bitim
SG	Shane Larkin	Talen Horton-Tucker	Ignas Sargiūnas	Melih Mahmutoğlu
PG	Wade Baldwin IV	Trent Forrest

=== BSL Depth chart ===
Pos.	Starting 5	Bench 1	Bench 2	Bench 3
C	Sertaç Şanlı	Marcus Bingham Jr.*	Dwight Powell*
PF	Braxton Key*	Will Clyburn*	Demircan Demir	Nicolò Melli*
SF	Johnny Juzang*	Onuralp Bitim		Kadir Yiğit Yancı
SG	Ignas Sargiūnas*	Talen Horton-Tucker*	Melih Mahmutoğlu	Shavon Shields*
PG	Trent Forrest*	Shane Larkin		Wade Baldwin IV*

- BSL requires a maximum of 7 registered foreign players per squad, with no more than 4 foreign players allowed on the court at any given time. Crucially, at least 1 Turkish player must remain on the floor during every second of game play. Foreign players are shown with an asterisk (*).

=== Team captains ===
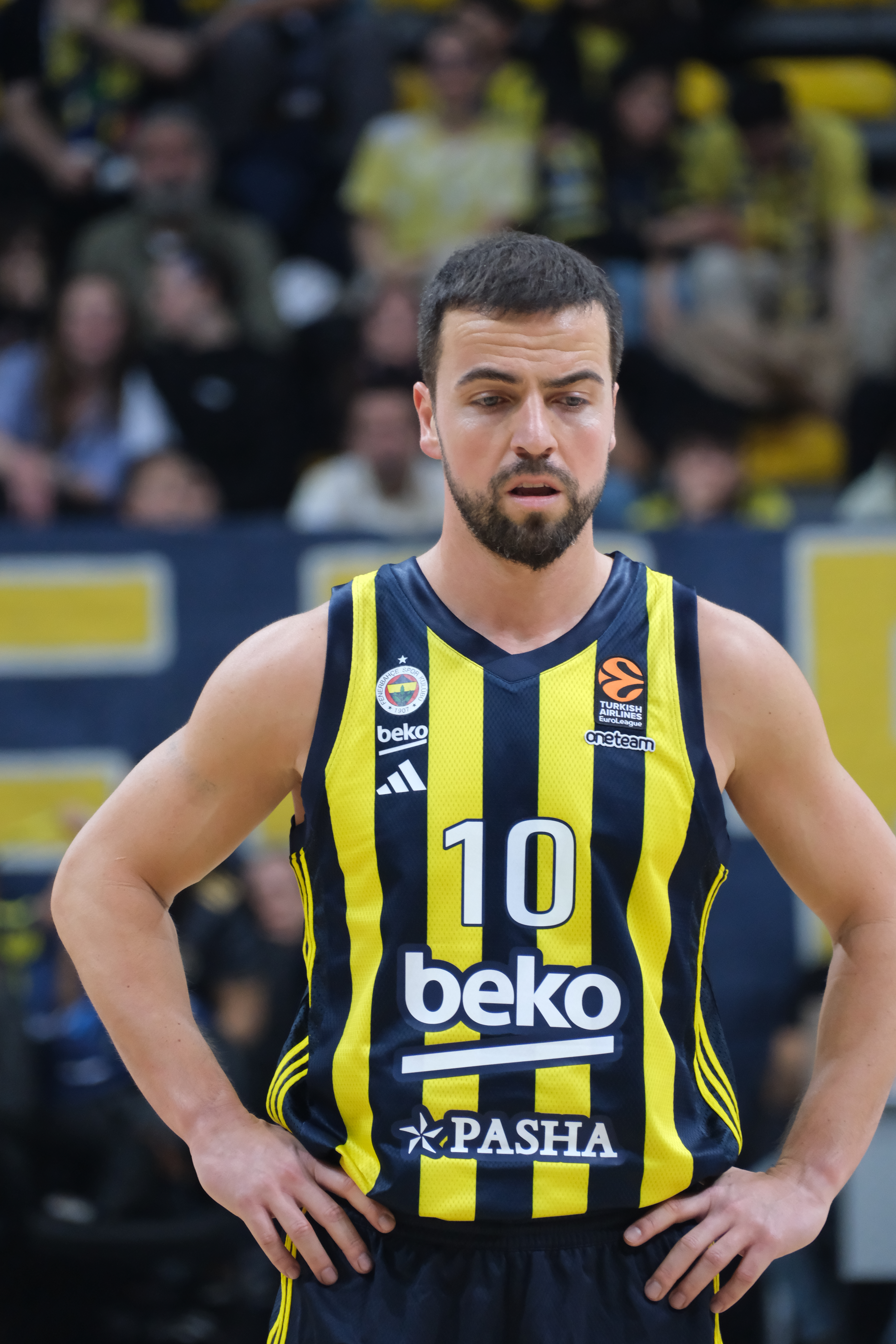
Melih Mahmutoğlu, team captain from 2015 to present

Period	Captain
1986–1990	(Turkey) Necdet Ronabar
1990–1993	(Turkey) Ali Limoncuoğlu
1993–1995	(Turkey) Hüsnü Çakırgil
1995–1998	(Turkey) Güray Kanan
1998–2003	(Turkey) (Georgia (country)) Zaza Enden
2003–2006	(Turkey) Zeki Gülay
2006–2010	(Bosnia and Herzegovina) (Turkey) Damir Mršić
2010–2014	(Turkey) Ömer Onan
2014–2015	(Turkey) (Slovenia) (Bosnia and Herzegovina) Emir Preldžić
2015–present	(Turkey) Melih Mahmutoğlu

=== Retired numbers ===
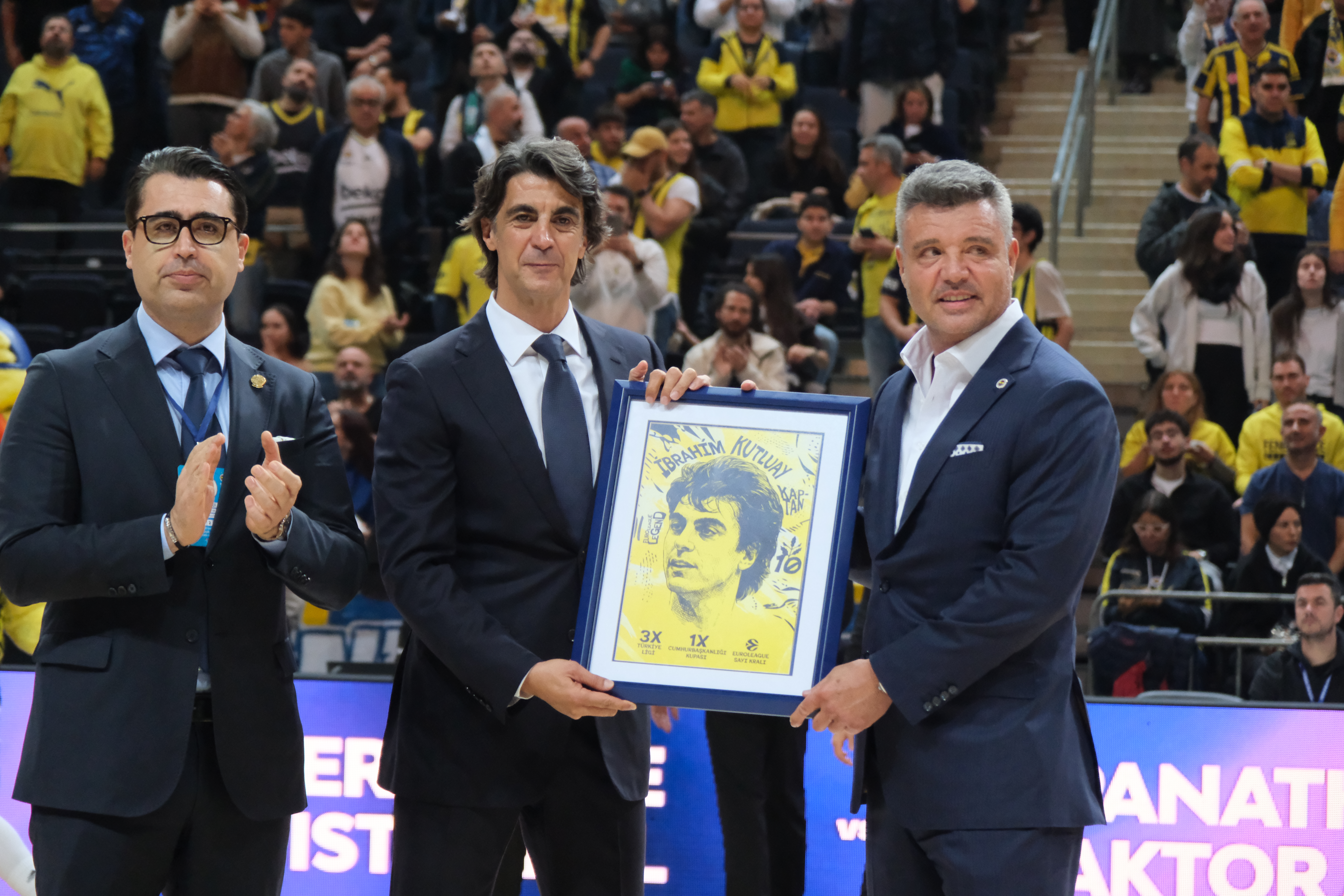
The ceremony to retire number of İbrahim Kutluay was conducted by President of Fenerbahçe Sadettin Saran before the EuroLeague match (2025)

Fenerbahçe retired numbers
No	Nat.	Player	Position	Tenure	Ceremony date
6	(Turkey)	Mirsad Türkcan	PF	2006–2012	16/09/2012
7	(Turkey)	Ömer Onan	SG	2004–2005; 2006–2014	17/10/2014
X	(Turkey)	İbrahim Kutluay	SG	1991–1999; 2006–2007	16/12/2025

=== Notable players ===
- (Turkey) Mustafa Abi, (6 seasons: '95-'01)
- (Turkey) Can Altıntığ, (1 season: '14-'15)
- (Turkey) Serdar Apaydın, (4 seasons: '97-'01)
- (Turkey) Ömer Aşık, (4 seasons: '05-'06, '07-'10)
- (Turkey) (Germany) Engin Atsür, (2 seasons: '10-'12)
- (Turkey) Efe Aydan, (4 seasons: '82-'86)
- (Turkey) Doğuş Balbay, (2 seasons: '04-'06)
- (Turkey) Can Bartu, (2 seasons: '55-'57)
- (Turkey) Mehmet Baturalp († 2017), (13 seasons: '54-'67)
- (Turkey) Erdal Bibo, (5 seasons: '01-'06)
- (Turkey) (Bosnia and Herzegovina) Tarik Biberović, (8 seasons: '18-'26)
- (Turkey) (Republic of Ireland) Metecan Birsen, (9 seasons: '11-'15, '21-'26)
- (Turkey) Onuralp Bitim, (2 seasons: '25-...)
- (Turkey) Ömer Büyükaycan, (1 season: '93-'94)
- (Turkey) Hüsnü Çakırgil, (5 seasons: '90-'95)
- (Turkey) Serhat Çetin, (3 seasons: '08-'10, '14-'15)
- (Turkey) (Bosnia and Herzegovina) Nedim Dal, (1 season: '01-'02)
- (Turkey) Hakan Demirel, (4 seasons: '05-'08, '11-'12)
- (Turkey) Kemal Dinçer, (9 seasons: '84-'93)
- (Turkey) (Georgia (country)) Zaza Enden, (8 seasons: '95-'03)
- (Turkey) Orhun Ene, (1 season: '92-'93)
- (Turkey) Semih Erden, (6 seasons: '05-'10, '14-'15)
- (Turkey) Harun Erdenay, (1 season: '93-'94)
- (Turkey) Barış Ermiş, (2 seasons: '12-'14)
- (Turkey) Murat Evliyaoğlu, (1 season: '00-'01)
- (Turkey) Samet Geyik, (1 season: '22-'23)
- (Turkey) Zeki Gülay, (11 seasons: '91-'96, '01-'07)
- (Turkey) Şehmus Hazer, (2 seasons: '21-'23)
- (Turkey) Güray Kanan, (8 seasons: '90-'98)
- (Turkey) İlkan Karaman († 2024), (2 seasons: '12-'14)
- (Turkey) Erman Kunter, (2 seasons: '87-'89)
- (Turkey) İbrahim Kutluay, (7 seasons: '93-'99, '06-'07)
- (Turkey) (United States) Shane Larkin, (1 season: '26-...)
- (Turkey) Ali Limoncuoğlu, (11 seasons: '82-'93)
- (Turkey) Melih Mahmutoğlu, (14 seasons: '13-...)
- (Turkey) (United States) Ali Muhammet, (6 seasons: '15-'21)
- (Turkey) (Russia) Can Maxim Mutaf, (5 seasons: '06-'11)
- (Turkey) Ömer Onan, (9 seasons: '04-'05, '06-'14)
- (Turkey) Tamer Oyguç, (1 season: '98-'99)
- (Turkey) (Bosnia and Herzegovina) Asım Pars († 2024), (1 season: '00-'01)
- (Turkey) Kaya Peker, (3 seasons: '10-'13)
- (Turkey) (Slovenia) (Bosnia and Herzegovina) Emir Preldžić, (8 seasons: '07-'15)
- (Turkey) Cenk Renda, (4 seasons: '91-'95)
- (Turkey) Necdet Ronabar, (7 seasons: '83-'90)
- (Turkey) Oğuz Savaş, (9 seasons: '06-'15)
- (Turkey) (Kosovo) (Albania) Kenan Sipahi, (4 seasons: '13-'16, '20-'21)
- (Turkey) Sertaç Şanlı, (3 seasons: '23-'25, '26-...)
- (Turkey) Tolga Tekinalp, (2 seasons: '99-'01)
- (Turkey) Levent Topsakal, (2 seasons: '93-'94, '97-'98)
- (Turkey) (Bosnia and Herzegovina) (Serbia) Mirsad Türkcan, (6 seasons: '06-'12)
- (Turkey) (United States) Scottie Wilbekin, (4 seasons: '22-'26)
- (Albania) (Turkey) Ermal Kuqo, (4 seasons: '95-'99)
- (Azerbaijan) (Turkey) (Russia) Rasim Başak, (7 seasons: '03-'10)
- (Bosnia and Herzegovina) (Turkey) Damir Mršić, (7 seasons: '01-'02, '04-'10)
- (Bosnia and Herzegovina) (United States) J.R. Bremer, (1 season: '12-'13)
- (Croatia) Bojan Bogdanović, (3 seasons: '11-'14)
- (Croatia) Gordan Giriček, (2 seasons: '08-'10)
- (Croatia) Žan Tabak, (1 season: '98-'99)
- (Croatia) Marko Tomas, (2 seasons: '10-'12)
- (Croatia) Roko Ukić, (2 seasons: '10-'12)
- (Croatia) Luka Žorić, (2 seasons: '13-'15)
- (Czech Republic) Jan Veselý, (8 seasons: '14-'22)
- (Denmark) (United States) Shavon Shields, (1 season: '26-...)
- (Finland) Mikael Jantunen, (1 season: '25-'26)
- (France) Nando de Colo, (4 seasons: '19-'22, '26)
- (France) Joffrey Lauvergne, (2 seasons: '18-'20)
- (France) (Morocco) (Algeria) Amine Noua, (1 season: '23-'24)
- (France) Léo Westermann, (1 season: '19-'20)
- (Georgia (country)) (United States) Ricky Hickman, (2 season: '14-'16)
- (Germany) (Turkey) İsmet Akpınar, (2 seasons: '21-'23)
- (Germany) Danilo Barthel, (2 seasons: '20-'22)
- (Greece) (Nigeria) Kostas Antetokounmpo, (1 season: '22-'23)
- (Greece) (United States) Nick Calathes, (2 seasons: '22-'24)
- (Greece) (United States) Tyler Dorsey, (2 seasons: '22-'24)
- (Greece) Georgios Papagiannis, (1 season: '23-'24)
- (Greece) Kostas Sloukas, (5 seasons: '15-'20)
- (Greece) Nikos Zisis, (1 season: '14-'15)
- (Israel) Yam Madar, (1 season: '23-'24)
- (Italy) Luigi Datome, (5 seasons: '15-'20)
- (Italy) (United States) Nicolò Melli, (5 seasons: '17-'19, '24-...)
- (Italy) Achille Polonara, (2 seasons: '20-'22)
- (Latvia) Kaspars Kambala, (2 seasons: '05-'07)
- (Latvia) Artūrs Žagars, (2 seasons: '24-'26)
- (Lithuania) Darjuš Lavrinovič, (1 season: '10-'11)
- (Lithuania) Šarūnas Jasikevičius, (1 season: '10-'11)
- (Lithuania) Linas Kleiza, (1 season: '13-'14)
- (Lithuania) Edgaras Ulanovas, (1 season: '20-'21)
- (Lithuania) Ignas Sargiūnas, (1 season: '26-...)
- (North Macedonia) Pero Antić, (2 seasons: '15-'17)
- (North Macedonia) (United States) Marques Green, (1 season: '08-'09)
- (North Macedonia) (United States) Bo McCalebb, (2 seasons: '12-'14)
- (Serbia) Bogdan Bogdanović, (3 seasons: '14-'17)
- (Serbia) (Israel) Radisav Ćurčić, (1 season: '99-'00)
- (Serbia) Marko Gudurić, (7 seasons: '17-'19, '20-'25)
- (Serbia) Nikola Kalinić, (5 seasons: '15-'20)
- (Serbia) Dragan Lukovski, (1 season: '00-'01)
- (Serbia) Boban Marjanović, (1 season: '24-'25)
- (Serbia) Nemanja Bjelica, (3 seasons: '13-'15, '22-'23)
- (Slovenia) Marko Milič, (1 season: '98-'99)
- (Slovenia) Gašper Vidmar, (7 seasons: '07-'14)
- (Spain) (United States) Lorenzo Brown, (1 season: '20-'21)
- (Switzerland) (South Africa) Thabo Sefolosha, (1 season: '11-'12)
- (Ukraine) Alexander Lokhmanchuk, (1 season: '98-'99)
- (Angola) Jilson Bango, (2 seasons: '25-'26)
- (Central African Republic) (United States) Romain Sato, (1 season: '12-'13)
- (Gabon) Chris Silva, (2 seasons: '26-...)
- (Nigeria) (United States) Ekpe Udoh, (2 seasons: '15-'17)
- (Nigeria) Tonye Jekiri, (1 season: '22-'23)
- (Senegal) (United States) Pierriá Henry, (1 season: '21-'22)
- (South Sudan) (Canada) Marial Shayok, (1 season: '21-'22)
- (Jordan) (Turkey) Ahmet Düverioğlu, (6 seasons: '16-'22)
- (Lebanon) (Tonga) Paul Afeaki Khoury, (1 season: '94-'95)
- (Australia) (Denmark) David Andersen, (1 season: '12-'13)
- (New Zealand) (Australia) Mark Dickel, (1 season: '02-'03)
- (South Korea) (United States) Moon Tae-jong, (1 season: '05-'06)
- (The Bahamas) (United States) Trevor Harvey, (2 seasons: '03-'05)
- (Canada) (Jamaica) Anthony Bennett, (1 season: '16-'17)
- (Canada) Khem Birch, (2 seasons: '24-'26)
- (Canada) Tyler Ennis, (1 season: '18-'19)
- (Canada) Dyshawn Pierre, (5 seasons: '20-'25)
- (Canada) Dwight Powell, (1 season: '26-...)
- (Canada) (Italy) Jay Triano, (1 season: '85-'86)
- (Mexico) Alex Pérez, (1 season: '20-'21)
- (United States) Mahmoud Abdul-Rauf, (1 season: '98-'99)
- (United States) Armando Bacot, (1 season: '25-'26)
- (United States) Wade Baldwin IV, (3 seasons: '24-...)
- (United States) Eddie Basden, (1 season: '06-'07)
- (United States) Mike Batiste, (1 season: '12-'13)
- (United States) Tanoka Beard, (1 season: '00-'01)
- (United States) Marcus Bingham Jr., (1 season: '26-...)
- (United States) Cory Blackwell, (1 season: '86-'87)
- (United States) Devin Booker, (2 seasons: '21-'23)
- (United States) Brandon Boston Jr., (1 season: '25-'26)
- (United States) Winford Boynes, (1 season: '83-'84)
- (United States) Joe Ira Clark, (1 season: '06-'07)
- (United States) Will Clyburn, (1 season: '26-...)
- (United States) Bonzie Colson, (2 seasons: '24-'26)
- (United States) Dallas Comegys, (3 seasons: '95-'98)
- (United States) Carsen Edwards, (1 season: '22-'23)
- (United States) Corsley Edwards, (1 season: '05-'06)
- (United States) Morris Finley, (1 season: '12-'13)
- (United States) Trent Forrest, (1 season: '26-...)
- (United States) (Turkey) James Gist, (1 season: '11-'12)
- (United States) Drew Goudelock, (1 season: '14-'15)
- (United States) Erick Green, (1 season: '18-'19)
- (United States) Lynn Greer, (2 seasons: '09-'11)
- (United States) Devon Hall, (2 seasons: '24-'26)
- (United States) Nigel Hayes-Davis, (3 seasons: '22-'25)
- (United States) Talen Horton-Tucker, (2 seasons: '25-...)
- (United States) Curtis Jerrells, (1 season: '11-'12)
- (United States) Keith Jennings, (1 season: '99-'00)
- (United States) Braxton Key, (1 season: '26-...)
- (United States) Bernard King, (1 season: '03-'04)
- (United States) Tarence Kinsey, (3 seasons: '07-'08, '09-'11)
- (United States) Sean May, (1 season: '10-'11)
- (United States) Skylar Mays, (1 season: '24-'25)
- (United States) Errick McCollum, (1 season: '24-'25)
- (United States) Conrad McRae († 2000), (2 seasons: '93-'94, '98-'99)
- (United States) Johnathan Motley, (2 seasons: '22-'24)
- (United States) James Nunnally, (3 seasons: '16-'18, '19-'20)
- (United States) Kyle O'Quinn, (1 season: '20-'21)
- (United States) (Turkey) Kevin Rankin, (1 season: '94-'95)
- (United States) Larry Richard, (3 seasons: '89-'92)
- (United States) Marc Salyers, (1 season: '04-'05)
- (United States) Jeff Sanders, (1 season: '99-'00)
- (United States) Nate Sestina, (1 season: '23-'24)
- (United States) Devin Smith, (1 season: '08-'09)
- (United States) Mitch Smith, (1 season: '94-'95)
- (United States) Willie Solomon, (3 seasons: '06-'08, '09-'10)
- (United States) Billy Thompson, (1 season: '93-'94)
- (United States) (Turkey) Henry Turner, (3 seasons: '95-'98)
- (United States) Brad Wanamaker, (1 season: '17-'18)
- (United States) Tyson Wheeler, (1 season: '98-'99)
- (United States) James White, (1 season: '07-'08)
- (United States) Derrick Williams, (1 season: '19-'20)
- (United States) Pete Williams, (2 seasons: '87-'89)
- (United States) (Turkey) Rickie Winslow, (1 season: '95-'96)

Italic written players still play for the club.

=== Coaches ===
Period	Coach
1944–49	(Turkey) none
1949–50	(Turkey) Feridun Koray
1951–65	(Turkey) Samim Göreç
1965–66	(Turkey) Samim Göreç / Sacit Seldüz / Mehmet Baturalp / Altan Dinçer
1966–67	(Turkey) Erol Demiroma / Altan Dinçer
1967–68	(Turkey) Altan Dinçer
1968–69	(Turkey) Önder Dai
1969–71	(Turkey) Mehmet Baturalp
1971–72	(Turkey) Mehmet Baturalp / Altan Dinçer / Deniz Sine / Bülent Yüksel
1972–73	(Turkey) Altan Dinçer
1973–75	(Turkey) Önder Seden
1975–76	(Turkey) Önder Seden / Hüseyin Kozluca
1976–78	(Turkey) Tuluğ Siyavuş
1978–79	(Turkey) Tuluğ Siyavuş / Hüseyin Kozluca
1979–82	(Turkey) Mehmet Baturalp
1982–83	(Turkey) Önder Seden
1983–84	(Turkey) Aydan Siyavuş / Önder Okan
1984–85	(Turkey) Önder Okan
1985–86	(United States) Dennis Perryman / (Turkey) Erdal Poyrazoğlu / Mahmut Uslu
1986–87	(Turkey) Faruk Akagün / Rıza Erverdi
1987–88	(Turkey) Rıza Erverdi / Doğan Hakyemez

Period	Coach
1988–89	(Turkey) Fehmi Sadıkoğlu / Rıza Erverdi
1989–93	(Turkey) Çetin Yılmaz
1993–94	(Turkey) Necati Güler / (Bosnia and Herzegovina) Faruk Kulenović
1994–95	(Turkey) Murat Didin
1995–96	(Turkey) Murat Didin / Murat Özgül
1996–98	(Turkey) Murat Özgül
1998–99	(Turkey) Murat Özgül / Halil Üner
1999–00	(Turkey) Halil Üner
2000–01	(Bosnia and Herzegovina) Nihat İziç
2001–04	(Turkey) Murat Özgül
2004–07	(Turkey) Aydın Örs
2007–09	(Montenegro) Bogdan Tanjević
2009–10	(Montenegro) Bogdan Tanjević / (Turkey) Ertuğrul Erdoğan
2010–12	(Croatia) Neven Spahija
2012–13	(Italy) Simone Pianigiani / (Turkey) Ertuğrul Erdoğan
2013–20	(Serbia) Željko Obradović
2020–21	(Serbia) Igor Kokoškov
2021–22	(Serbia) Aleksandar Đorđević
2022–23	(Greece) Dimitrios Itoudis
2023–present	(Lithuania) Šarūnas Jasikevičius

== Honours ==
=== European competitions ===
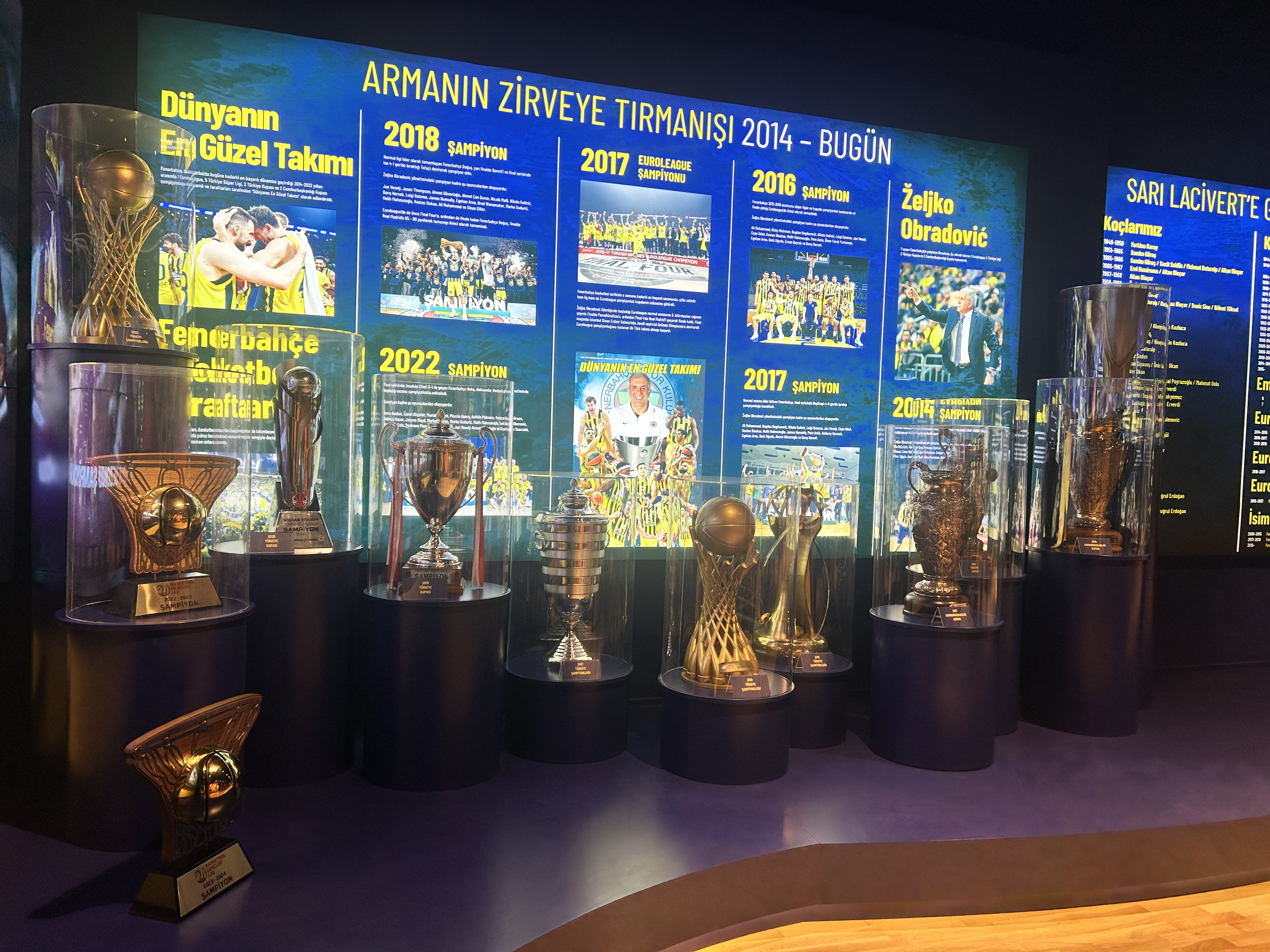
A section of the club's basketball museum where some of the trophies are exhibited

- EuroLeague

Winners (2): 2016–17, 2024–25
Runners-up (2): 2015–16, 2017–18
Fourth-place (3): 2014–15, 2018–19, 2023–24
Final Four (8): 2015, 2016, 2017, 2018, 2019, 2024, 2025, 2026

- EuroLeague SuperCup

Third place (1): 2026

- FIBA Europe League

Fourth-place (1): 2004–05

=== Team honours ===
- Triple Crown

Winners (1): 2024–25

=== National competitions ===
- Turkish Basketball Championship / Turkish Super League

Winners (16): 1957, 1959, 1965, 1990–91, 2006–07, 2007–08, 2009–10, 2010–11, 2013–14, 2015–16, 2016–17, 2017–18, 2021–22, 2023–24, 2024–25, 2025–26
Runners-up (16): 1954, 1956, 1958, 1963, 1964, 1967, 1967–68, 1969–70, 1970–71, 1982–83, 1984–85, 1992–93, 1994–95, 2008–09, 2018–19, 2020–21

- Turkish Cup

Winners (10): 1966–67, 2009–10, 2010–11, 2012–13, 2016, 2019, 2020, 2024, 2025, 2026
Runners-up (5): 1993–94, 1996–97, 1998–99, 2014–15, 2022

- Turkish Presidential Cup

Winners (9): 1990, 1991, 1994, 2007, 2013, 2016, 2017, 2025, 2026
Runners-up (11): 1985, 1988, 2008, 2009, 2010, 2011, 2014, 2018, 2019, 2022, 2024

- Turkish Federation Cup (defunct)

Winners (5): 1954, 1958, 1959, 1960, 1961
Runners-up (2): 1948, 1951

=== Regional competitions ===
- Istanbul Basketball League (defunct)

Winners (7): 1954–55, 1955–56, 1956–57, 1962–63, 1963–64, 1964–65, 1965–66
Runners-up (3): 1950–51, 1953–54, 1957–58

== Season by season ==
Season	Tier	League	Pos.	Turkish Cup	Presidential Cup	European competitions			Roster
1998–99	1	TBL	3rd	Runners-up	—	1 EuroLeague	R16	Murat Özgül	Alexander Lokhmanchuk, Barış Süer, Conrad McRae, Ermal Kurtoğlu, George Gilmore, Goran Kalamiza, İbrahim Kutluay, Levent Topsakal, Mahmoud Abdul-Rauf, Marko Milič, Mustafa Abi, Reha Öz, Serdar Apaydın, Tamer Oyguç, Tyson Wheeler, Zaza Enden (C), Žan Tabak
1999–00	1	TBL	10th	Group stage	—	2 Saporta Cup	GS	Halil Üner	Barış Süer, Cömert Küce, Jerome Robinson, Jeff Sanders, Keith Jennings, Kemal Tunçeri, Mark Miller, Mert Uyguç, Mustafa Abi, Reha Öz, Serdar Çağlan, Radisav Ćurčić, Tolga Tekinalp, Zaza Enden (C)
2000–01	1	TBL	5th	Group stage	—	3 Korać Cup	QF	Nihat Izić	Alper Ruhcan, Altan Çetinkaya, Asım Pars, Barış Süer, Cömert Küce, Dragan Lukovski, Murat Evliyaoğlu, Mustafa Abi, Serdar Apaydın, Silas Mills, Tanoka Beard, Tolga Tekinalp, Zaza Enden (C)
2001–02	1	TBL	8th	Group stage	—	3 Korać Cup	R1	Murat Özgül	Altan Çetinkaya, Barış Güney, Barış Süer, Cömert Küce, Damir Mršić, Erdal Bibo, Glen Whisby, Kenyan Weaks, Mustafa Kemal Bitim, Nedim Dal, Samir Baş, Zaza Enden (C), Zeki Gülay, Živko Badžim
2002–03	1	TBL	6th	Group stage	—			Murat Özgül	Ahmet Arkın, Alpay Öztaş, Altan Çetinkaya, Barış Güney, Çağdaş Çiftçi, Derrick Davenport, Emre Ekim, Eren İbre, Erkan Veyseloğlu, Erdal Bibo, Lionel Halton, Lou Kelly, Mark Dickel, Samir Baş, Samir Gouda, Sherron Wilkerson, Zaza Enden (C), Zeki Gülay
2003–04	1	TBL	8th	Group stage	—	4 Europe Cup	SFC	Murat Özgül	Ahmet Arkın, Altan Çetinkaya, Barış Güney, Bernard King, Emre Ekim, Erdal Bibo, Erkan Veyseloğlu, İsmail Çevik, Mark Dickel, Mike Jones, Rasim Başak, Trevor Harvey, Umut Tınay, Umut Yenice, Willie Earl Walls, Zeki Gülay (C)
2004–05	1	TBL	4th	Quarterfinalists	—	3 Europe League	4th	Aydın Örs	Altan Çetinkaya, Barış Güney, Chris Booker, Corsley Edwards, Damir Mršić, Doğuş Balbay, Emre Ekim, Erdal Bibo, Levent Bilgin, Marc Salyers, Ömer Onan, Rasim Başak, Trevor Harvey, Zeki Gülay (C)
2005–06	1	TBL	7th	Semifinalists	—	3 EuroCup	R2	Aydın Örs	Altan Çetinkaya, Barış Güney, Chester Mason, Cory Violette, Damir Mršić, Doğuş Balbay, Erdal Bibo, Hakan Demirel, Moon Tae-Jong, Kaspars Kambala, Levent Bilgin, Ömer Aşık, Rasim Başak, Semih Erden, Serkan İnan, Zeki Gülay (C)
2006–07	1	TBL	1st	Semifinalists	Champions	1 EuroLeague	RS	Aydın Örs	Can Maxim Mutaf, Damir Mršić, Eddie Basden, Hakan Demirel, İbrahim Kutluay, Joe Ira Clark, Kaspars Kambala, Mirsad Türkcan, Oğuz Savaş, Ömer Onan, Rasim Başak, Semih Erden, Willie Solomon, Zeki Gülay (C)
2007–08	1	TBL	1st	Semifinalists	Runners-up	1 EuroLeague	QF	Bogdan Tanjević	Can Maxim Mutaf, Damir Mršić (C), Emir Preldžič, Gašper Vidmar, Hakan Demirel, İbrahim Kutluay, James White, Mirsad Türkcan, Oğuz Savaş, Ömer Aşık, Ömer Onan, Rasim Başak, Semih Erden, Tarence Kinsey, Willie Solomon
2008–09	1	TBL	2nd	Semifinalists	Runners-up	1 EuroLeague	T16	Bogdan Tanjević	Can Maxim Mutaf, Damir Mršić (C), Devin Smith, Emir Preldžič, Enes Kanter, Gašper Vidmar, Gordan Giriček, Hakan Demirel, Marques Green, Mirsad Türkcan, Oğuz Savaş, Ömer Aşık, Ömer Onan, Rasim Başak, Semih Erden, Willie Solomon
2009–10	1	TBL	1st	Champions	Runners-up	1 EuroLeague	RS	Bogdan Tanjević	Berkay Candan, Can Maxim Mutaf, Damir Mršić (C), Emir Preldžič, Erbil Eroğlu, Gašper Vidmar, Gordan Giriček, Kerem Hotiç, Lynn Greer, Mirsad Türkcan, Oğuz Savaş, Ömer Aşık, Ömer Onan, Rasim Başak, Roko Ukić, Semih Erden, Serhat Cetin, Tarence Kinsey
2010–11	1	TBL	1st	Champions	Runners-up	1 EuroLeague	T16	Neven Spahija	Berkay Candan, Can Maxim Mutaf Darjuš Lavrinovič, Emir Preldžič, Engin Atsür, Erbil Eroğlu, Gašper Vidmar, Kaya Peker, Kerem Hotiç, Lynn Greer, Marko Tomas, Mirsad Türkcan, Oğuz Savaş, Ömer Onan (C), Rasid Mahalbasić, Roko Ukić, Šarūnas Jasikevičius, Sean May, Tarence Kinsey
2011–12	1	TBL	5th	Quarterfinalists	—	1 Euroleague	T16	Neven Spahija	Berkay Candan, Bojan Bogdanović, Curtis Jerrells, Emir Preldžič, Engin Atsür, Erbil Eroğlu, Gašper Vidmar, James Gist, Hakan Demirel, Kaya Peker, Kerem Hotiç, Marko Tomas, Mirsad Türkcan, Morris Finley, Oğuz Savaş, Ömer Onan (C), Rasid Mahalbasić, Roko Ukić, Thabo Sefolosha
2012–13	1	TBL	5th	Champions	Champions	1 EuroLeague	T16	Simone Pianigiani / Ertuğrul Erdoğan	Barış Ermiş, Bo McCalebb, Bojan Bogdanović, Can Maxim Mutaf, David Andersen, Emir Preldžič, Erbil Eroğlu, İlkan Karaman, J. R. Bremer, Kaya Peker, Mike Batiste, Metecan Birsen, Oğuz Savaş, Ömer Onan (C), Romain Sato, Uroš Tripković
2013–14	1	TBL	1st	Semifinalists	Runners-up	1 EuroLeague	T16	Željko Obradović	~~Barış Ermiş~~, Berk Uğurlu, Blagota Sekulić, Bo McCalebb, Bojan Bogdanović, Emir Preldžič, Gašper Vidmar, İlkan Karaman, İzzet Türkyılmaz, Kenan Sipahi, Linas Kleiza, Luka Žorić, Melih Mahmutoğlu, Metecan Birsen, Nemanja Bjelica, Oğuz Savaş, Ömer Onan (C), ~~Pierre Jackson~~
2014–15	1	TBL	3rd	Runners-up	—	1 EuroLeague	4th	Željko Obradović	Andrew Goudelock, ~~Ayberk Olmaz~~, Berk Uğurlu, Bogdan Bogdanović, ~~Can Altıntığ~~, Emir Preldžič (C), ~~İzzet Türkyılmaz~~, Jan Veselý, Kenan Sipahi, Luka Žorić, Melih Mahmutoğlu, ~~Metecan Birsen~~, Nemanja Bjelica, Nikolaos Zisis, Oğuz Savaş, Ömer Faruk Yurtseven, Ricky Hickman, Semih Erden, Serhat Çetin
2015–16	1	BSL	1st	Champions	Champions	1 EuroLeague	RU	Željko Obradović	~~Ayberk Olmaz~~, Barış Hersek, Berk Uğurlu, Bobby Dixon, Bogdan Bogdanović, Egehan Arna, Ekpe Udoh, Ercan Bayrak, Jan Veselý, ~~Kenan Sipahi~~, Kostas Sloukas, Luigi Datome, Melih Mahmutoğlu (C), Nikola Kalinić, ~~Ömer Faruk Yurtseven~~, Pero Antić, Ricky Hickman
2016–17	1	BSL	1st	Quarterfinalists	Champions	1 EuroLeague	C	Željko Obradović	Ahmet Düverioğlu, Ahmet Can Duran, Anthony Bennett, Barış Hersek, Berk Uğurlu, Bobby Dixon, Bogdan Bogdanović, Egehan Arna, Ekpe Udoh, ~~Ercan Bayrak~~, James Nunnally, Jan Veselý, Kostas Sloukas, Luigi Datome, Melih Mahmutoğlu (C), Nikola Kalinić, Pero Antić, ~~Yordan Minchev~~
2017–18	1	BSL	1st	Quarterfinalists	Runners-up	1 EuroLeague	RU	Željko Obradović	Ahmet Düverioğlu, Ahmet Can Duran, Barış Hersek, Bobby Dixon, Brad Wanamaker, Egehan Arna, James Nunnally, Jan Veselý, Jason Thompson, Kostas Sloukas, Luigi Datome, Melih Mahmutoğlu (C), Marko Gudurić, Nikola Kalinić, Nicolò Melli, Sinan Güler, ~~Yordan Minchev~~
2018–19	1	BSL	2nd	Champions	Runners-up	1 EuroLeague	4th	Željko Obradović	Ahmet Düverioğlu, Barış Hersek, Bobby Dixon, Egehan Arna, Ergi Tırpancı, Erick Green, Jan Veselý, Joffrey Lauvergne, Kostas Sloukas, Luigi Datome, Melih Mahmutoğlu (C), Marko Gudurić, Nikola Kalinić, Nicolò Melli, Sinan Güler, Tarık Biberović, Tyler Ennis, ~~Yordan Minchev~~
2019–20	1	BSL	CX	Champions	Cancelled	1 EuroLeague	CX	Željko Obradović	Ahmet Düverioğlu, Berkay Candan, Bobby Dixon, Derrick Williams, Egehan Arna, Ekrem Sancaklı, Ergi Tırpancı, James Nunnally, Jan Veselý, Joffrey Lauvergne, Kostas Sloukas, Léo Westermann, Luigi Datome, Malcolm Thomas, Melih Mahmutoğlu (C), Nando de Colo, Nikola Kalinić, Tarık Biberović, ~~Vladimir Štimac~~
2020–21	1	BSL	2nd	Cancelled	Cancelled	1 EuroLeague	QF	Igor Kokoškov	Ahmet Düverioğlu, Alex Pérez, Berkay Candan, Bobby Dixon, Danilo Barthel Dyshawn Pierre, Edgaras Ulanovas, ~~Ekrem Sancaklı~~, Jan Veselý, Jarell Eddie, ~~Johnny Hamilton~~, ~~Kenan Sipahi~~, Kyle O'Quinn, ~~Léo Westermann~~, Lorenzo Brown, Marko Gudurić, Melih Mahmutoğlu (C), Nando de Colo, Tarık Biberović, Yiğit Onan
2021–22	1	BSL	1st	Runners-up	Runners-up	1 EuroLeague	12th	Aleksandar Đorđević	Achille Polonara, Ahmet Düverioğlu, Danilo Barthel, Devin Booker, Dyshawn Pierre, Ekrem Sancaklı, İsmet Akpınar, Jan Veselý, Jehyve Floyd, ~~Marial Shayok~~, Markel Starks, Marko Gudurić, Melih Mahmutoğlu (C), Metecan Birsen, Nando de Colo, Pierriá Henry, Şehmus Hazer, Tarık Biberović
2022–23	1	BSL	3rd	Cancelled	Cancelled	1 EuroLeague	QF	Dimitris Itoudis	Carsen Edwards, Devin Booker, Dyshawn Pierre, Ekrem Sancaklı, İsmet Akpınar, Johnathan Motley, Kostas Antetokounmpo, Marko Gudurić, Melih Mahmutoğlu (C), Metecan Birsen, Nemanja Bjelica, Nick Calathes, Nigel Hayes-Davis, Samet Geyik, Scottie Wilbekin, Şehmus Hazer, Tarık Biberović, Tonye Jekiri, Tyler Dorsey
2023–24	1	BSL	1st	Champions	Runners-up	1 EuroLeague	4th	Dimitris Itoudis/ Šarūnas Jasikevičius	~~Artūrs Žagars~~, Amine Noua, Dyshawn Pierre, Georgios Papagiannis, Johnathan Motley, Marko Gudurić, Melih Mahmutoğlu (C), Mert Emre Ekşioğlu, Metecan Birsen, Nate Sestina, ~~Nemanja Bjelica~~, Nick Calathes, Nigel Hayes-Davis, Ömer Ege Ziyaettin, ~~Raul Neto~~, Scottie Wilbekin, Sertaç Şanlı, Şehmus Hazer, Tarık Biberović, Tyler Dorsey, Yam Madar, Yiğit Hamza Mestoğlu
2024–25	1	BSL	1st	Champions	Champions	1 EuroLeague	C	Šarūnas Jasikevičius	Artūrs Žagars, ~~Boban Marjanović~~, Bonzie Colson, Devon Hall, Dyshawn Pierre, Errick McCollum, ~~Erten Gazi~~, Jilson Bango, Khem Birch, ~~Luka Šamanić~~, Marko Gudurić, Melih Mahmutoğlu (C), Mert Emre Ekşioğlu, Metecan Birsen, Nicolò Melli, Nigel Hayes-Davis, ~~Onuralp Bitim~~, Ömer Ege Ziyaettin, Scottie Wilbekin, ~~Skylar Mays~~, Sertaç Şanlı, Tarık Biberović, Wade Baldwin IV, Yiğit Hamza Mestoğlu
2025–26	1	BSL	1st	Champions	Champions	1 EuroLeague	SF	Šarūnas Jasikevičius	Armando Bacot, Artūrs Žagars, Bonzie Colson, Brandon Boston Jr., Chris Silva, Devon Hall, Jilson Bango, Khem Birch, Melih Mahmutoğlu (C), Mert Emre Ekşioğlu, Metecan Birsen, Mikael Jantunen, Nando De Colo, Nicolò Melli, Onuralp Bitim, ~~Scottie Wilbekin~~, Talen Horton-Tucker, Tarık Biberović, Wade Baldwin IV, Yiğit Hamza Mestoğlu
2026–27	1	BSL				1 EuroLeague		Šarūnas Jasikevičius	Bonzie Colson, Chris Silva, Melih Mahmutoğlu (C), Mert Emre Ekşioğlu, Metecan Birsen, Mikael Jantunen, Nicolò Melli, Onuralp Bitim, Talen Horton-Tucker, Tarık Biberović, Wade Baldwin IV, Yiğit Hamza Mestoğlu

~~crossed out~~ written players are leave the club by cancelled contract or loaned out in regular season.

== Individual awards and achievements ==
Retired Numbers

- 6 Mirsad Türkcan
- 7 Ömer Onan
- - İbrahim Kutluay

NBA Draft

- Bogdan Bogdanović
- Bojan Bogdanović
- Emir Preldžić
- İbrahim Kutluay (undrafted)
- Ömer Aşık
- Ömer Yurtseven (NCAA)
- Semih Erden
- Tarik Biberović

50 Greatest EuroLeague Contributors
Chosen:

- Šarūnas Jasikevičius
- Željko Obradović

Nominated:

- İbrahim Kutluay
- Mirsad Türkcan

EuroLeague Legends

- Šarūnas Jasikevičius
- Mirsad Türkcan

EuroLeague Basketball 2000–10 All-Decade Team
Chosen:

- Šarūnas Jasikevičius

Nominated:

- İbrahim Kutluay
- Mirsad Türkcan

EuroLeague Basketball 2010–20 All-Decade Team
Chosen:

- Bogdan Bogdanović
- Nando de Colo

Nominated:

- Kostas Sloukas
- Michael Batiste
- Devin Smith
- Luigi Datome
- Ekpe Udoh
- Nicolò Melli
- Nemanja Bjelica
- James Gist
- Pero Antić
- Jan Veselý

EuroLeague MVP

- Nemanja Bjelica (2014–15)
- Jan Veselý (2018–19)

EuroLeague Final Four MVP

- Ekpe Udoh (2016–17)
- Nigel Hayes-Davis (2024–25)

All-EuroLeague First Team

- Nemanja Bjelica (2014–15)
- Jan Veselý (2015–16, 2017–18, 2018–19)
- Bogdan Bogdanović (2016–17)
- Ekpe Udoh (2016–17)
- Kostas Sloukas (2018–19)
- Nigel Hayes-Davis (2023–24)

All-EuroLeague Second Team

- Andrew Goudelock (2014–15)
- Ekpe Udoh (2015–16)
- Luigi Datome (2015–16)
- Nando de Colo (2020–21)

EuroLeague MVP of the Month

- Nemanja Bjelica (2014–15, March)
- Jan Veselý (2015–16, January), (2018–19, December), (2020–21, January)
- Ekpe Udoh (2015–16, April)
- Bogdan Bogdanović (2016–17, April)

EuroLeague Rising Star

- Bogdan Bogdanović (2014–15)

EuroLeague Coach of the Year

- Željko Obradović (2016–17)
- Šarūnas Jasikevičius (2024–25)

EuroLeague Executive of the Year

- Maurizio Gherardini (2016–17)

EuroLeague Magic Moment of the Season

- Jan Veselý (2017–18 with an Alley-oop dunk over Brandon Davies)
- Jan Veselý (2018–19 with an Alley-oop dunk)
- Jan Veselý (2020–21 with a Poster dunk)

EuroLeague records since 2000–01

- Andrew Goudelock: Most 3-point field goals made in a game (10) (2014–15, Week 5)
- Ekpe Udoh: Most blocked shots (68) (2016–17)

EuroLeague Top Scorer

- İbrahim Kutluay (1998–99)

EuroLeague Rebounding Leaders

- 1998–99 Žan Tabak: 10.00 (in 18 games)
- 2008–09 Mirsad Türkcan: 8.64 (in 14 games)
- 2010–11 Mirsad Türkcan: 7.33 (in 12 games)

EuroLeague Blocked Shoots Leaders

- 2007–08 Ömer Aşık: 2.06 (in 15 games)
- 2015–16 Ekpe Udoh: 2.12 (in 25 games)

Turkish Super League Finals MVP

- Tarence Kinsey (2009–10)
- Oğuz Savaş (2010–11)
- Luigi Datome (2015–16)
- Bogdan Bogdanović (2016–17)
- Brad Wanamaker (2017–18)
- Jan Veselý (2021–22)
- Nigel Hayes-Davis (2023–24)
- Khem Birch (2024–25)
- Wade Baldwin IV (2025–26)

Turkish League Top Scorer

- Hüseyin Kozluca (1968–69)
- Erman Kunter (1987–88)
- İbrahim Kutluay (1998–99)

Turkish Cup Final MVP

- Emir Preldžić (2010–11)
- David Andersen (2012–13)
- Bogdan Bogdanović (2016)
- Luigi Datome (2019, 2020)
- Nick Calathes (2024)
- Nigel Hayes-Davis (2025)
- Tarik Biberović (2026)

Turkish Super Cup MVP

- Bobby Dixon (2016)
- Luigi Datome (2017)
- Devon Hall (2025)

== Sponsorship and kits ==
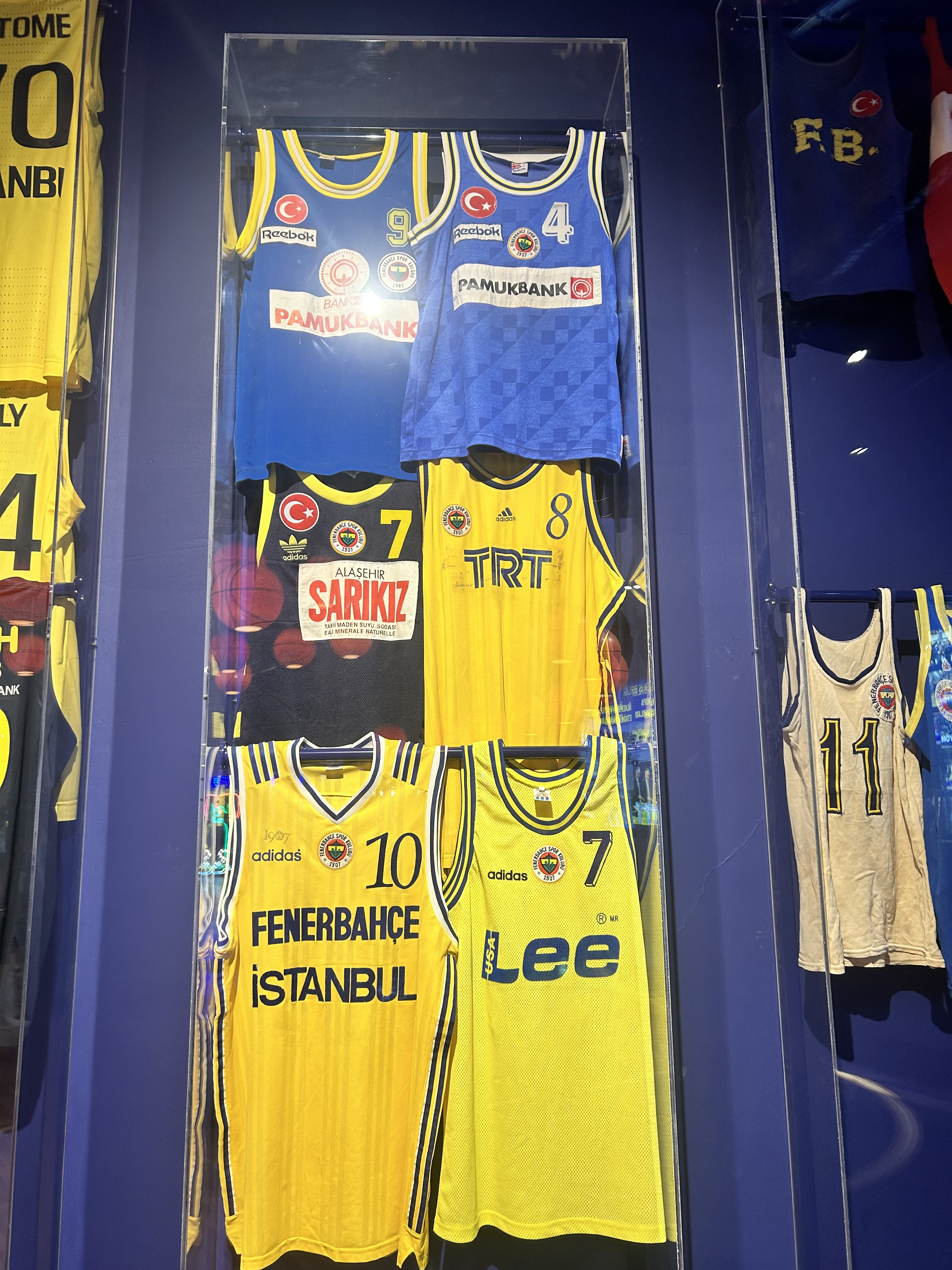
The block containing the kits worn by the team in the 80s and 90s, located in the Fenerbahçe Basketball Museum

Period	Kit manufacturers
1990–1994	Reebok
1994–2000	Adidas
2000–2013	Fenerium
2013–2021	Nike
2021–2023	Fenerium
2023–present	Adidas

Period	Kit sponsors
2003–2005	Aras Kargo
2005–2006	Alpella^{1} / Aras Kargo^{2}
2006–2012	Ülker^{x/1} / içim^{2/3}
2012–2013	Ülker^{x/1} / metro^{2}
2013–2015	Ülker^{x/1} / metro^{2} ^{3}
2015–2016	Ülker^{x/1} / Odeabank^{2} / metro^{3}
2016–2017	metro^{x/1} / QNB Finansbank^{2} / Borajet Airlines^{4 (*)}
2017–2018	Doğuş^{x/1} / QNB Finansbank^{2}
2018–2021	Beko^{x/1} / QNB Finansbank^{2}
2021–2022	Beko^{x/1} / MSC^{2} / Safiport^{3}
2022–2023	Beko^{x/1} / MSC^{2} / Mahkeme Lokantası^{3}
2023–2025	Beko^{x/1} / MSC^{2} / Mahkeme Lokantası^{5}
2025-2026	Beko ^{x/1} / MSC^{2} / RAMS^{2} / Milk Academy^{5} / EN-EZ^{5} / YKT Filo^{5}
2026-present	^{Tarfin x/1}/ MSC^{2} / RAMS^{2} / Milk Academy^{5} / EN-EZ^{5} / YKT Filo^{5}

^{x} Name sponsorship ^{1} Main sponsorship ^{2} Back sponsorship ^{3} Short sponsorship ^{4} Transportation sponsorship ^{5} Arm side sponsorship
^{(*)} One Embraer 195 jet (TC-YAT) is painted with the club's livery

== Home courts and museum ==
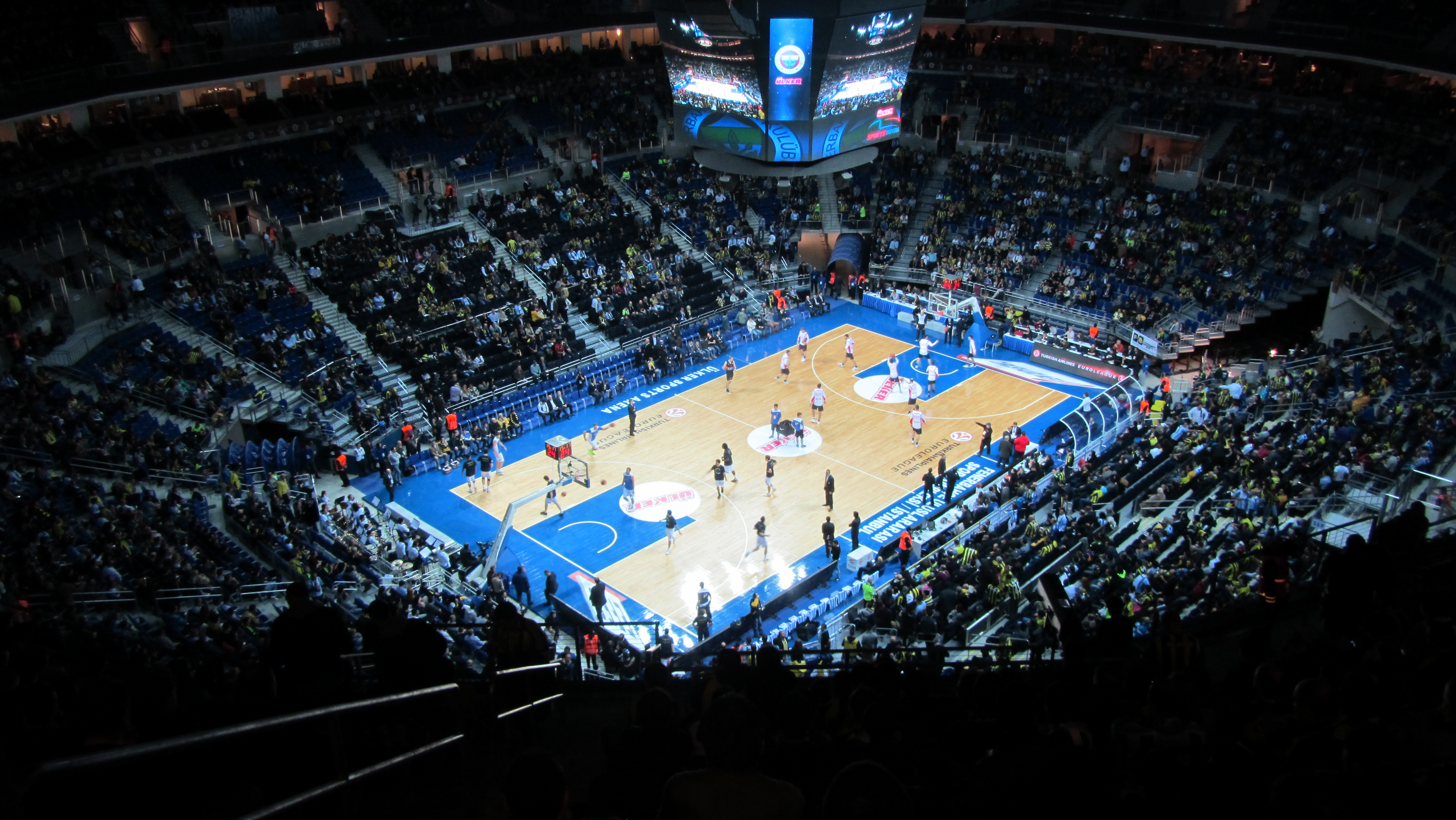
The first match at Ülker Sports Arena against Olimpia Milano

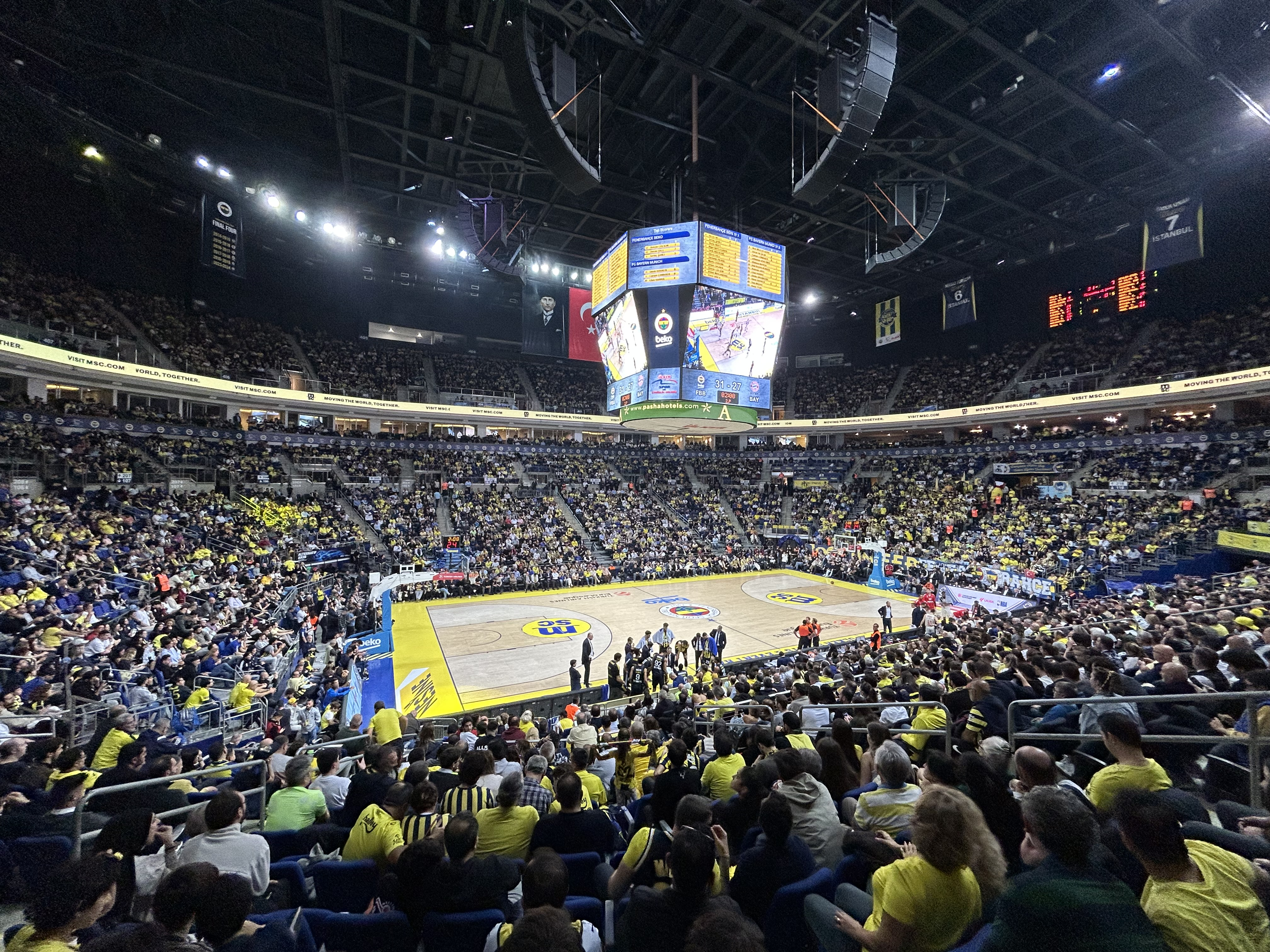
Fenerbahçe Ülker Sports Arena during a EuroLeague game, 2024

#	Court	Capacity	Period
1	Istanbul Sports and Exhibition Palace	7,000	1949–1988
2	Lütfi Kırdar Convention and Exhibition Center	7,000	1988–1989
3	Abdi İpekçi Arena	12,270	1989
4	Lütfi Kırdar Convention and Exhibition Center	7,000	1989–1992
5	Abdi İpekçi Arena	12,270	1992–2010
6	Sinan Erdem Dome	16,000	2010–2012
7	Ülker Sports and Event Hall	13,800	2012–present

=== Museum ===
The Fenerbahçe Basketball Museum, which is the first and only basketball museum in Turkey, contains the entire history of the basketball team from 1913 to the present. The museum is located in the Ülker Sports Arena, the team's basketball hall. Previously located in the Şükrü Saracoğlu Stadium in Kadıköy, the club's headquarters, the trophies and all awards belonging to the basketball branch were transferred to this new museum, which was opened on November 18, 2022. The museum displays the trophies and awards of the men's basketball team, as well as the women's basketball team.

== Trivia ==
- First team to achieve the greatest success in European cups by clubs in Turkey (2016–17 season EuroLeague Champion)
- First and only Turkish team to achieve the Triple Crown (2024–25)
- First team to win the Turkish Cup (1966–67)
- First team to win the Presidential Cup for 2 consecutive years (1989–90, 1990–91)
- Only Turkish team to win against NBA teams (October 5, 2012 Fenerbahçe 97–91 Boston Celtics)
- Turkish team with the most wins against NBA teams. It is the 4th team in Europe (2 Wins)
- Only Turkish team to beat an NBA team in the Americas. In Europe, it is the 2nd team after CSKA Moscow (October 5, 2015 Brooklyn Nets 96–101 Fenerbahçe)
- The Turkish team that finished the EuroLeague 1st round groups as the leader the most (3 times: 2011–12, 2013–14, 2015–16)
- The Turkish team that won the most in a single EuroLeague season (28 wins in the 2018–19 season, 25 wins in the regular season, 3 wins in the play-offs)
- The Turkish team that won the most at home in a single EuroLeague season (14 wins – 0 losses in the 2015–16 season)
- The Turkish team that won the most in the same season in EuroLeague history, Maccabi Tel Aviv, CSKA Moscow, Olympiacos and Barcelona on the road
- First Turkish team to advance to the EuroLeague finals (2015–16 season)
- Turkish team with the highest winning average in the EuroLeague (Fenerbahçe 54%, Anadolu Efes 51%)
- Only Turkish team to advance to the EuroLeague Final Four for five consecutive seasons (2014–15, 2015–16, 2016–17, 2017–18, 2018–19 seasons)
- First Turkish team to become champions in the EuroLeague (2016–17 season)
- First Turkish team to finish the regular season as the leader in the EuroLeague (2018–19 season)
- First Turkish team to play in three consecutive EuroLeague finals (2016, 2017, 2018)

== See also ==
- Fenerbahçe Koleji Novotel
- Fenerbahçe Opet
