= Nedim Dal =

Turkish basketball player (born 1975)

Personal information
- Born: 3 May 1975 (age 51) Tuzla, SR Bosnia and Herzegovina, SFR Yugoslavia
- Listed height: 7 ft 0.3 in (2.14 m)
- Listed weight: 255 lb (116 kg)

Career information
- NBA draft: 1997: undrafted
- Playing career: 1993–2012
- Position: Center
- Number: 15, 11, 10

Career history
- 1991–1993: Sloboda Dita
- 1993–1994: İTÜ
- 1995–1998: Tuborg
- 1998–2000: Efes Pilsen
- 2000–2001: Troy Pilsner
- 2001–2002: Fenerbahçe
- 2002: KK Olimpija
- 2002–2003: Oyak Renault
- 2003-2004: Türk Telekom
- 2004-2005: Tofaş
- 2005-2006: Tekelspor
- 2006-2007: Mersin BB
- 2007-2011: Oyak Renault
- 2011-2012: Antalya BB

Nedim Dal (born Edin Delić; on 3 May 1975) is a retired Turkish basketball player. He stands 2.14 m tall and played as a center. He holds Turkish and Bosnian citizenships and played for Turkey in late 1990s and early 2000s.
