= Trevor Harvey (basketball) =

Bahamian basketball player (born 1980)

Personal information
- Born: September 25, 1980 (age 46) Inagua, The Bahamas
- Listed height: 6 ft 9.5 in (2.07 m)
- Listed weight: 240 lb (109 kg)

Career information
- High school: Freeport Catholic (Freetown, Bahamas)
- College: Marshalltown CC (1999–2001); Florida State (2001–2003)
- NBA draft: 2003: undrafted
- Playing career: 2003–2013
- Position: Power forward

Career history
- 2003–2005: Fenerbahçe
- 2005–2006: Chalon Basket
- 2006–2007: PBC CSKA Sofia
- 2007–2008: Solna Vikings
- 2008–2009: Falco KC Szombathely
- 2009: Uşak Sportif
- 2009–2010: SCM CSU Craiova
- 2010–2011: Algodoneros de la Comarca
- 2012: CSS Giurgiu
- 2013: Wydad Casablanca

Trevor Livingston Harvey (born 25 September 1980) is a basketball player from Inagua, Bahamas.

Known for his shot-blocking ability and solid rebounding at the center position, Harvey had a notable college career at Marshalltown Community College in Iowa and at Florida State University for the Seminoles.

== College career ==
=== Junior college (1999-2001) ===
In his freshman year at Marshalltown CC, Harvey averaged 2.5 blocked shots with a 60.3% field goal percentage. During his sophomore year, he averaged 13.0 points, 6.5 rebounds, and 3.0 blocked shots, showcasing a 57.1% field goal accuracy.

=== Florida State (2001-2003) ===
In fall 2002, Harvey transferred to Florida State for his final two years. In the ACC, Harvey tied for 10th in blocked shots, recording at least one blocked shot in 20 games. Notable performances in his junior year included a season-high 10 points against Western Carolina and seven points, seven rebounds, and three blocked shots at Georgia Tech.

As a senior, Harvey averaged 8.4 points, 5.1 rebounds, and 1.2 blocked shots in 18.4 minutes per game during his senior year. He led the team in field goal percentage and blocked shots and recorded a career-high double-double with 19 points and 10 rebounds against Maryland.

=== Highlights ===
Harvey concluded his collegiate career at Florida State, ranking sixth in career field goal percentage (57.6%) and 12th in blocked shots (60). He earned all-tourney honors at the 2003 Portsmouth Invitational Tournament, averaging 14.7 points, 6.7 rebounds, and 3.67 blocked shots.

== Professional career ==
Although undrafted in the 2003 NBA draft, Harvey played at least two seasons of professional basketball.

He joined the French team Chalon-Sur-Saone for the 2005-2006 season and later played for CSȘ Giurgiu in southern Romania during the 2012-2013 season.
