= Erdal Bibo =

Turkish basketball player (born 1977)

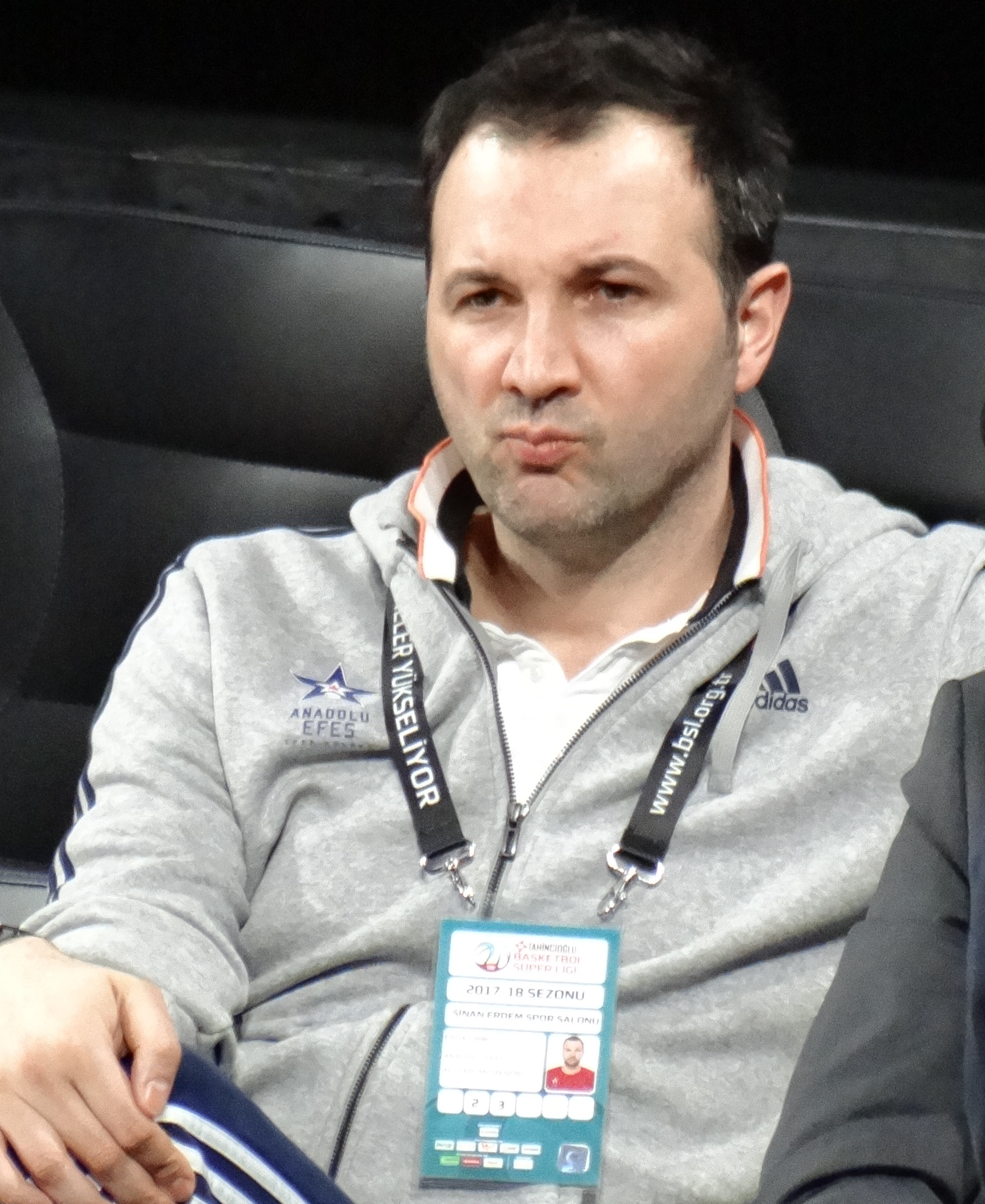
- Bibo in 2018

Personal information
- Born: 8 January 1977 (age 49) Istanbul, Turkey
- Listed height: 6 ft 5 in (1.96 m)
- Listed weight: 215 lb (98 kg)

Career information
- NBA draft: 1999: undrafted
- Playing career: 1995–2014
- Position: Small forward / shooting guard
- Number: 7, 4

Career history
- 1995-1998: Efes Pilsen
- 1998–2000: Türk Telekom
- 2000-2001: Efes Pilsen
- 2001-2006: Fenerbahçe
- 2006-2007: Beşiktaş
- 2007-2008: Beykoz
- 2008-2010: Erdemirspor
- 2010-2011: Olin Edirne
- 2011-2012: Mersin BB
- 2012-2014: TED Ankara Kolejliler

Erdal Bibo (born 8 January 1977 in Turkey) is a Turkish professional basketball player. He finally played for TED Ankara Kolejliler and wore the number 7 jersey. The small forward is 1.96 m tall and 99 kg weights.
