= Tolga Tekinalp =

Turkish basketball player

Personal information
- Born: 28 December 1974 (age 51) Sinop, Turkey
- Listed height: 204 cm (6 ft 8 in)

Career information
- Playing career: 1990–2013
- Position: Forward

Career history
- 1990–1991: Anadolu Efes (Turkey)
- 1991–1994: Kolejliler (Turkey)
- 1994–1999: Ülkerspor (Turkey)
- 1999–2001: Fenerbahçe (Turkey)
- 2001–2002: 08 Stockholm (Sweden)
- 2003–2006: Beşiktaş (Turkey)
- 2006–2007: Galatasaray (Turkey)
- 2008–2011: İstanbul Teknik Üniversitesi (Turkey 2nd)
- 2011–2012: Maliye Milli Piyango (Turkey 2nd)
- 2012–2013: İstanbul Teknik Üniversitesi (Turkey 3rd)

Career highlights
- 2x Turkish League champion (1995, 1998)

Tolga Tekinalp (born 28 December 1974) is a Turkish former professional basketball player who played the majority of his career in the Turkish Basketball League (TBL). He also competed multiple times for the Turkish national team during the 1990s.

== Career ==
After joining the Anadolu Efes junior ranks in 1988, Tekinalp went on to join the Anadolu Efes senior team in 1990–91. He move to TED Ankara Kolejliler in 1991 and was with the club for three seasons before going on to play seven seasons for Fenerbahçe, winning championships in 1995 and 1998. A change of scenery came in 2001–02 when he joined 08 Stockholm of the Swedish Basketligan and went on to average 18 points and eight rebounds per game.

In September 2002, Tekinalp received a try-out period with JDA Dijon Basket of the LNB Pro A but he did not end up signing with them.

In 2003, Tekinalp returned to Turkey and signed with Beşiktaş where he went on to play three seasons with the club. Then, after playing one season for Galatasaray in 2006–07, he joined İstanbul Teknik Üniversitesi of the Turkish second division. He played three and a half seasons for ITU before joining Maliye Milli Piyango in December 2011.

Tekinalp's final season came in 2012–13 as he re-joined İstanbul Teknik Üniversitesi. He retired following the 2012–13 season.
