= Hakan Demirel =

Turkish basketball player (born 1986)

Personal information
- Born: 7 May 1986 (age 40) Erzurum, Turkey
- Listed height: 1.91 m (6 ft 3 in)
- Listed weight: 187 lb (85 kg)

Career information
- NBA draft: 2008: undrafted
- Playing career: 2003–2017
- Position: Point guard

Career history
- 2003–2005: Tofaş
- 2005–2008: Fenerbahçe
- 2008–2009: Erdemir
- 2009–2010: Darüşşafaka
- 2010–2011: Erdemir
- 2011–2012: Fenerbahçe
- 2012: Antalya BB
- 2012–2013: Royal Halı Gaziantep
- 2013–2014: Tofaş
- 2015: Uşak Sportif
- 2015–2016: Trabzonspor
- 2016–2017: Uşak Sportif
- 2017: İstanbul BB

Career highlights
- 2× Turkish League champion (2007, 2008); Turkish President's Cup winner (2007)
Medals
Men's basketball
Representing Turkey
FIBA Europe Under-18 Championship
Silver medal – second place	2004 Zaragoza	U-18 Team
Mediterranean Games
Bronze medal – third place	2009 Pescara	Team competition

İsmail Hakan Demirel (born 7 May 1986) is a Turkish former professional basketball player. He is 1.91 m tall and played the point guard position.

== Career ==
He studied at Istanbul Bilgi University. He started his professional career with Tofaş in Turkish Basketball 2nd League. He was recruited to play for the Western Carolina University Catamounts, but the NCAA declared him permanently ineligible as a collegiate athlete because he played professional basketball in Turkey.

Demirel played his whole professional career in Turkey with the following clubs : Tofaş, Fenerbahçe, Erdemir, Darüşşafaka, Antalya BB, Royal Halı Gaziantep, Tofaş, Uşak Sportif, Trabzonspor B.K. and İstanbul BB.

== National team career ==
With the junior national teams of Turkey, Demirel won the silver medal's at the 2004 FIBA Europe Under-18 Championship and at the 2006 FIBA Europe Under-20 Championship. He also won the bronze medal at the 2009 Mediterranean Games.

He was also member of the senior Turkish national basketball team at the 2006 FIBA World Championship and the EuroBasket 2007.

== Career highlights ==
- 2004 - Turkish 2nd Basketball League Championship
- 2002 - MVP of Turkish 2nd Basketball League
- 2004 - MVP of European Young Guards
- 2004 - 2nd Place of European Championship
- 2006 - 2nd Place of European Championship
- 2006 - 6th Place of World Championship
- 2007 - Turkish Basketball League Championship
- 2007 - Turkish President's Cup Championship
- 2007 - 10th best European young player
- 2008 - Turkish Basketball League Championship

=== Turkish national team ===
- 2004 FIBA Europe Under-18 Championship: Silver
