= Yeşim Demirel =

Turkish-German footballer (born 1990)

Personal information
- Date of birth: April 19, 1990 (age 36)
- Place of birth: Sinsheim, Baden-Württemberg, Germany
- Height: 1.64 m (5 ft 5 in)
- Position: Forward

Senior career*
Years	Team	Apps	(Gls)
2009–2011	TSG Hoffenheim Women	12	(4)
2011–2013	1. FFC 08 Niederkirchen	31	(1)
2013–?	Karlsruher SC		

International career
2011–2017	Turkey	12	(0)
- * Club domestic league appearances and goals

Yeşim Demirel (born April 19, 1990) is a former footballer who played as a forward. Born in Germany, she made 12 appearances for the Turkey national team since 2011.

== Club career ==
Demirel started playing football for TSG Hoffenheim Women in the 2009–10 season. After two seasons, she transferred to 1. FFC 08 Niederkirchen. In the 2013–14 season, Demirel joined the women's team of Karlsruher SC.

== International career ==
Demirel was called up for the Turkey national team debuting in the friendly match against the Greek women on April 27, 2011. She played in the UEFA Women's Euro 2013 qualifying – Group 2 matches for Turkey.
