= Fenerbahçe (men's basketball) past rosters =

This article contains past rosters of the Fenerbahçe Men's Basketball team.

== 1990 Era ==
=== 1990/91 ===
Titles

- (Turkey) Turkish League
- (Turkey) Turkish President's Cup

Roster

- (Turkey) Ali Limoncuoğlu (C)
- (Turkey) Bülent Tacettin
- (Turkey) Can Sonat
- (Turkey) Cenk Gürsoy
- (Turkey) Ferhat Oktay
- (Turkey) Güray Kanan
- (Turkey) Hakan Artış
- (Turkey) Hüsnü Çakırgil
- (Turkey) Kemal Dinçer
- (United States) Larry Richard
- (Turkey) Levent Topsakal
- (Turkey) Ömer Lakay
- Head coach: (Turkey) Çetin Yılmaz

=== 1991/92 ===
Roster

- (Turkey) Ali Limoncuoğlu (C)
- (Turkey) Can Sonat
- (Turkey) Cenk Gürsoy
- (Turkey) Cenk Renda
- (Turkey) Güray Kanan
- (Turkey) Kemal Dinçer
- (Turkey) Hüsnü Çakırgil
- (Turkey) İbrahim Kutluay
- (United States) Larry Richard
- (Turkey) Levent Topsakal
- (Turkey) Mehmet Ali Tlabar
- (Turkey) Ömer Lakay
- (Turkey) Zeki Gülay
- Head coach: (Turkey) Çetin Yılmaz

=== 1992/93 ===
Titles

- (Turkey) Turkish League Runner-up

Roster

- (Turkey) Ali Limoncuoğlu (C)
- (Turkey) Altar Tunçkol
- (Turkey) Cem Üner
- (Turkey) Cenk Gürsoy
- (Turkey) Cenk Renda
- (United States) Charles Sanders
- (Turkey) Engin Ayengin
- (Turkey) Ferhat Oktay
- (Turkey) Güray Kanan
- (Turkey) Kemal Dinçer
- (Turkey) Hüsnü Çakırgil
- (Turkey) İbrahim Kutluay
- (United States) Keith Williams
- (United States) Kevin Holland
- (Turkey) Orhun Ene
- (Turkey) Ömer Lakay
- (Turkey) Zeki Gülay
- Head coach: (Turkey) Çetin Yılmaz

=== 1993/94 ===
Titles

- (Turkey) Turkish Cup Runner-up
- (Turkey) Turkish President's Cup

Roster

- (Turkey) Altar Tunçkol
- (Turkey) Barış Akyurt
- (United States) Conrad McRae
- (Turkey) Cenk Gürsoy
- (Turkey) Cenk Renda
- (Turkey) Güray Kanan
- (Turkey) Harun Erdenay
- (Turkey) Hüsnü Çakırgil (C)
- (Turkey) İbrahim Kutluay
- (United States) Kenny Miller
- (Turkey) Levent Topsakal
- (Turkey) Ömer Büyükaycan
- (United States) William Thompson
- (Turkey) Zeki Gülay
- Head coach: (Turkey) Necati Güler

=== 1994/95 ===
Titles

Roster

- (United States) Adrian Caldwell
- (Turkey) Altar Tunçkol
- (Turkey) Cenk Gürsoy
- (Turkey) Cenk Renda
- (Turkey) Cihangir Badem
- (Turkey) Faruk Beşok
- (Turkey) Gökbörü Aygar
- (Turkey) Güray Kanan
- (Turkey) Hakan Yörükoğlu
- (Turkey) Hüsnü Çakırgil (C)
- (Turkey) İbrahim Kutluay
- (United States) (Turkey) Kevin Rankin
- (United States) Mitch Smith
- (Lebanon) (Tonga) (United States) Paul Khoury
- (Turkey) Yalçın Küçüközcan
- Head coach: (Turkey) Murat Didin

=== 1995/96 ===
Honors

- (European Union) Korać Cup Quarter Finalist

Roster

- (Turkey) Altar Tunçkol
- (Turkey) Burak Bıyıktay
- (Turkey) Cenk Gürsoy
- (United States) Dallas Comegys
- (Turkey) Erdal Koşan
- (Turkey) Ermal Kurtoğlu
- (Turkey) Gökbörü Aygar
- (Turkey) Güray Kanan (C)
- (United States) (Turkey) Henry Turner
- (Turkey) Hicri Güneri
- (Turkey) İbrahim Kutluay
- (Turkey) Mustafa Abi
- (Turkey) Osman Yaycıoğlu
- (United States) Rickie Winslow
- (Turkey) (Georgia (country)) Zaza Enden
- Head coach: (Turkey) Murat Didin

=== 1996/97 ===
Roster

- (Turkey) Burak Bıyıktay
- (Turkey) Cenk Gürsoy
- (United States) Dallas Comegys
- (Turkey) Ermal Kurtoğlu
- (Turkey) Erdal Koşan
- (Turkey) Güray Kanan (C)
- (United States) (Turkey) Henry Turner
- (Turkey) Hicri Güneri
- (Turkey) İbrahim Kutluay
- (Turkey) Melih Sevda
- (Turkey) Mustafa Abi
- (Turkey) Reha Öz
- (Turkey) (Georgia (country)) Zaza Enden
- Head coach: (Turkey) Murat Özgül

=== 1997/98 ===
Roster

- (Armenia) (Turkey) Aksel Barutciyan
- (United States) Dallas Comegys
- (Turkey) Erdal Koşan
- (Turkey) Ermal Kurtoğlu
- (Turkey) Güray Kanan (C)
- (United States) (Turkey) Henry Turner
- (Turkey) Hicri Güneri
- (Turkey) İbrahim Kutluay
- (Turkey) Levent Topsakal
- (Turkey) Mustafa Abi
- (United States) Odell Hodge
- (Turkey) Reha Öz
- (Turkey) Serdar Apaydın
- (Turkey) (Georgia (country)) Zaza Enden
- Head coach: (Turkey) Murat Özgül

=== 1998/99 ===
Roster

- (Ukraine) Alexander Lokhmanchuk
- (Turkey) Barış Süer
- (United States) Conrad McRae
- (Turkey) Ermal Kurtoğlu
- (United States) George Gilmore
- (Croatia) Goran Kalamiza
- (Turkey) İbrahim Kutluay
- (Turkey) Levent Topsakal
- (United States) Mahmoud Abdul-Rauf
- (Slovenia) Marko Milič
- (Turkey) Mustafa Abi
- (Turkey) Reha Öz
- (Turkey) Serdar Apaydın
- (Turkey) Tamer Oyguç
- (United States) Tyson Wheeler
- (Turkey) (Georgia (country)) Zaza Enden (C)
- (Croatia) Žan Tabak
- Head coach: (Turkey) Murat Özgül

=== 1999/00 ===
Roster

- (Turkey) Barış Süer
- (Turkey) Cömert Küce
- (United States) Jerome Robinson
- (United States) Jeff Sanders
- (United States) Keith Jennings
- (Turkey) Kemal Tunçeri
- (United States) Mark Miller
- (Turkey) Mert Uyguç
- (Turkey) Mustafa Abi
- (Turkey) Reha Öz
- (Turkey) Serdar Çağlan
- (Serbia) (Israel) Radisav Ćurčić
- (Turkey) Tolga Tekinalp
- (Turkey) (Georgia (country)) Zaza Enden (C)
- Head coach: (Turkey) Halil Üner

== 2000 Era ==
=== 2000/01 ===
Honors

- (European Union) Korać Cup Quarter Finalist

Roster

- (Turkey) Alper Ruhcan
- (Turkey) Altan Çetinkaya
- (Turkey) (Bosnia and Herzegovina) Asım Pars
- (Turkey) Barış Süer
- (Turkey) Cömert Küce
- (Serbia) Dragan Lukovski
- (Turkey) Murat Evliyaoğlu
- (Turkey) Mustafa Abi
- (Turkey) Serdar Apaydın
- (United States) Silas Mills
- (United States) Tanoka Beard
- (Turkey) Tolga Tekinalp
- (Turkey) (Georgia (country)) Zaza Enden (C)
- Head coach: (Bosnia and Herzegovina) (Turkey) Nihat Izić

=== 2001/02 ===
Honors

- (European Union) Korać Cup Quarter Finalist

Roster

- (Turkey) Altan Çetinkaya
- (Turkey) Barış Güney
- (Turkey) Barış Süer
- (Turkey) Cömert Küce
- (Bosnia and Herzegovina) (Turkey) Damir Mršić
- (Turkey) Erdal Bibo
- (United States) Glen Whisby
- (United States) Kenyan Weaks
- (Turkey) Mustafa Kemal Bitim
- (Turkey) (Bosnia and Herzegovina) Nedim Dal
- (Turkey) Samir Baş
- (Turkey) (Georgia (country)) Zaza Enden
- (Turkey) Zeki Gülay (C)
- (Croatia) Živko Badžim
- Head coach: (Turkey) Murat Özgül

=== 2002/03 ===
Roster

- (Turkey) Ahmet Arkın
- (Turkey) Alpay Öztaş
- (Turkey) Altan Çetinkaya
- (Turkey) Barış Güney
- (Turkey) Çağdaş Çiftçi
- (United States) Derrick Davenport
- (Turkey) Emre Ekim
- (Turkey) Eren İbre
- (Turkey) Erkan Veyseloğlu
- (Turkey) Erdal Bibo
- (United States) Lionel Halton
- (United States) Lou Kelly
- (New Zealand) (Australia) Mark Dickel
- (Turkey) Samir Baş
- (Egypt) Samir Gouda
- (United States) Sherron Wilkerson
- (Turkey) (Georgia (country)) Zaza Enden (C)
- (Turkey) Zeki Gülay
- Head coach: (Turkey) Murat Özgül

=== 2003/04 ===
Honors

- (European Union) EuroCup Third

Roster

- (Turkey) Ahmet Arkın
- (Turkey) Altan Çetinkaya
- (Turkey) Barış Güney
- (United States) Bernard King
- (Turkey) Emre Ekim
- (Turkey) Erdal Bibo
- (Turkey) Erkan Veyseloğlu
- (Turkey) İsmail Çevik
- (New Zealand) (Australia) Mark Dickel
- (United States) Mike Jones
- (Turkey) (Azerbaijan) (Russia) Rasim Başak
- (The Bahamas) (United States) Trevor Harvey
- (Turkey) Umut Tınay
- (Turkey) Umut Yenice
- (United States) Willie Earl Walls
- (Turkey) Zeki Gülay (C)
- Head coach: (Turkey) Murat Özgül

=== 2004/05 ===
Honors

- (European Union) EuroCup Forth

Roster

- (Turkey) Altan Çetinkaya
- (Turkey) Barış Güney
- (United States) Chris Booker
- (United States) Corsley Edwards
- (Bosnia and Herzegovina) (Turkey) Damir Mršić
- (Turkey) Doğuş Balbay
- (Turkey) Emre Ekim
- (Turkey) Erdal Bibo
- (Turkey) Levent Bilgin
- (United States) Marc Salyers
- (Turkey) Ömer Onan
- (Turkey) (Azerbaijan) (Russia) Rasim Başak
- (The Bahamas) (United States) Trevor Harvey
- (Turkey) Zeki Gülay (C)
- Head coach: (Turkey) Aydın Örs

=== 2005/06 ===
Roster

- (Turkey) Altan Çetinkaya
- (Turkey) Barış Güney
- (United States) Chester Mason
- (United States) (Italy) Cory Violette
- (Bosnia and Herzegovina) (Turkey) Damir Mršić
- (Turkey) Doğuş Balbay
- (Turkey) Erdal Bibo
- (Turkey) Hakan Demirel
- (South Korea) (United States) Moon Tae-Jong
- (Latvia) Kaspars Kambala
- (Turkey) Levent Bilgin
- (Turkey) Ömer Aşık
- (Turkey) (Azerbaijan) (Russia) Rasim Başak
- (Turkey) (Bosnia and Herzegovina) Semih Erden
- (Sweden) (Turkey) Serkan İnan
- (Turkey) Zeki Gülay (C)
- Head coach: (Turkey) Aydın Örs

=== 2006/07 ===
Titles

- (Turkey) Turkish League
- (Turkey) Turkish President's Cup

Roster

- (Turkey) (Russia) Can Maxim Mutaf
- (Bosnia and Herzegovina) (Turkey) Damir Mršić
- (United States) Eddie Basden
- (Turkey) Hakan Demirel
- (Turkey) İbrahim Kutluay
- (United States) Joe Ira Clark
- (Latvia) Kaspars Kambala
- (Turkey) (Bosnia and Herzegovina) (Serbia) Mirsad Türkcan
- (Turkey) Oğuz Savaş
- (Turkey) Ömer Onan
- (Turkey) (Azerbaijan) (Russia) Rasim Başak
- (Turkey) (Bosnia and Herzegovina) Semih Erden
- (United States) Willie Solomon
- (Turkey) Zeki Gülay (C)
- Head coach: (Turkey) Aydın Örs

=== 2007/08 ===
Titles

- (Turkey) Turkish League
- (Turkey) Turkish President's Cup Runner-up

Honors

- (European Union) Euroleague Quarter Finalist

Roster

- (Turkey) (Russia) Can Maxim Mutaf
- (Bosnia and Herzegovina) (Turkey) Damir Mršić (C)
- (Turkey) (Slovenia) (Bosnia and Herzegovina) Emir Preldžič
- (Slovenia) Gašper Vidmar
- (Turkey) Hakan Demirel
- (Turkey) İbrahim Kutluay
- (United States) James White
- (Turkey) (Bosnia and Herzegovina) (Serbia) Mirsad Türkcan
- (Turkey) Oğuz Savaş
- (Turkey) Ömer Aşık
- (Turkey) Ömer Onan
- (Turkey) (Azerbaijan) (Russia) Rasim Başak
- (Turkey) (Bosnia and Herzegovina) Semih Erden
- (United States) Tarence Kinsey
- (United States) Willie Solomon
- Head coach: (Montenegro) (Italy) Bogdan Tanjević

=== 2008/09 ===
Titles

- (Turkey) Turkish League Runner-up
- (Turkey) Turkish Cup

Roster

- (Turkey) (Russia) Can Maxim Mutaf
- (Bosnia and Herzegovina) (Turkey) Damir Mršić (C)
- (United States) Devin Smith
- (Turkey) (Slovenia) (Bosnia and Herzegovina) Emir Preldžič
- (Turkey) (Switzerland) Enes Kanter
- (Slovenia) Gašper Vidmar
- (Croatia) Gordan Giriček
- (Turkey) Hakan Demirel
- (North Macedonia) (United States) Marques Green
- (Turkey) (Bosnia and Herzegovina) (Serbia) Mirsad Türkcan
- (Turkey) Oğuz Savaş
- (Turkey) Ömer Aşık
- (Turkey) Ömer Onan
- (Turkey) (Azerbaijan) (Russia) Rasim Başak
- (Turkey) (Bosnia and Herzegovina) Semih Erden
- (United States) Willie Solomon
- Head coach: (Montenegro) (Italy) Bogdan Tanjević

=== 2009/10 ===
Titles

- (Turkey) Turkish League
- (Turkey) Turkish Cup

Roster

- (Turkey) Berkay Candan
- (Turkey) (Russia) Can Maxim Mutaf
- (Bosnia and Herzegovina) (Turkey) Damir Mršić (C)
- (Turkey) (Slovenia) (Bosnia and Herzegovina) Emir Preldžič
- (Turkey) Erbil Eroğlu
- (Slovenia) Gašper Vidmar (*)
- (Croatia) Gordan Giriček
- (Turkey) Kerem Hotiç
- (United States) Lynn Greer
- (Turkey) (Bosnia and Herzegovina) (Serbia) Mirsad Türkcan
- (Turkey) Oğuz Savaş
- (Turkey) Ömer Aşık
- (Turkey) Ömer Onan
- (Turkey) (Azerbaijan) (Russia) Rasim Başak
- (Croatia) Roko Ukić
- (Turkey) (Bosnia and Herzegovina) Semih Erden
- (Turkey) Serhat Cetin
- (United States) Tarence Kinsey
- Head coach: (Montenegro) (Italy) Bogdan Tanjević
- Ass. coach: (Turkey) Ertuğrul Erdoğan

(*) Played Turkish Basketball League play-off matches after loan-back.

== 2010 Era ==
=== 2010/11 ===
Titles

- (Turkey) Turkish League
- (Turkey) Turkish Cup
- (Turkey) Turkish President's Cup

Roster

- (Turkey) Berkay Candan
- (Turkey) (Russia) Can Maxim Mutaf
- (Lithuania) (Poland) Darjuš Lavrinovič
- (Turkey) (Slovenia) (Bosnia and Herzegovina) Emir Preldžič
- (Turkey) (Germany) Engin Atsür
- (Turkey) Erbil Eroğlu
- (Slovenia) Gašper Vidmar
- (Turkey) Kaya Peker
- (Turkey) Kerem Hotiç
- (United States) Lynn Greer
- (Croatia) Marko Tomas
- (Turkey) (Bosnia and Herzegovina) (Serbia) Mirsad Türkcan
- (Turkey) Oğuz Savaş
- (Turkey) Ömer Onan (C)
- (Austria) (Slovenia) (Bosnia and Herzegovina) Rasid Mahalbasić
- (Croatia) Roko Ukić
- (Lithuania) Šarūnas Jasikevičius
- (United States) Sean May
- (United States) Tarence Kinsey
- General Manager: (Turkey) Aydın Örs
- Head coach: (Croatia) Neven Spahija
- Manager: (Bosnia and Herzegovina) (Turkey) Damir Mršić

=== 2011/12 ===
Roster

- (Turkey) Berkay Candan
- (Croatia) Bojan Bogdanović
- (United States) Curtis Jerrells
- (Turkey) (Slovenia) (Bosnia and Herzegovina) Emir Preldžič
- (Turkey) (Germany) Engin Atsür
- (Turkey) Erbil Eroğlu
- (Slovenia) Gašper Vidmar
- (United States) (Turkey) James Gist
- (Turkey) Hakan Demirel
- (Turkey) Kaya Peker
- (Turkey) Kerem Hotiç
- (Croatia) Marko Tomas
- (Turkey) (Bosnia and Herzegovina) (Serbia) Mirsad Türkcan
- (United States) Morris Finley
- (Turkey) Oğuz Savaş
- (Turkey) Ömer Onan (C)
- (Austria) (Slovenia) (Bosnia and Herzegovina) Rasid Mahalbasić
- (Croatia) Roko Ukić
- (Switzerland) (South Africa) Thabo Sefolosha
- General Manager: (Turkey) Aydın Örs
- Head coach: (Croatia) Neven Spahija
- Manager: (Bosnia and Herzegovina) (Turkey) Damir Mršić

=== 2012/13 ===
- (Turkey) Turkish Cup

Roster

- (Turkey) Barış Ermiş
- (North Macedonia) (United States) Bo McCalebb
- (Croatia) Bojan Bogdanović
- (Turkey) (Russia) Can Maxim Mutaf
- (Australia) (Denmark) David Andersen
- (Turkey) (Slovenia) (Bosnia and Herzegovina) Emir Preldžič
- (Turkey) Erbil Eroğlu
- (Turkey) İlkan Karaman
- (Bosnia and Herzegovina) (United States) J. R. Bremer
- (Turkey) Kaya Peker
- (United States) Mike Batiste
- (Turkey) (Republic of Ireland) Metecan Birsen
- (Turkey) Oğuz Savaş
- (Turkey) Ömer Onan (C)
- (Central African Republic) Romain Sato
- (Serbia) Uroš Tripković
- General Manager: (Turkey) Kemal Dinçer
- Head coach: (Italy) Simone Pianigiani / (Turkey) Ertuğrul Erdoğan
- Manager: (Turkey) Serdar Apaydın

=== 2013/14 ===
Titles

- (Turkey) Turkish League
- (Turkey) Turkish President's Cup

Roster

- (Turkey) Barış Ermiş (*)
- (Turkey) Berk Uğurlu
- (Montenegro) Blagota Sekulić
- (North Macedonia) (United States) Bo McCalebb
- (Croatia) Bojan Bogdanović
- (Turkey) (Slovenia) (Bosnia and Herzegovina) Emir Preldžič
- (Slovenia) Gašper Vidmar
- (Turkey) İlkan Karaman
- (Turkey) İzzet Türkyılmaz
- (Turkey) (Kosovo) Kenan Sipahi
- (Lithuania) Linas Kleiza
- (Croatia) Luka Žorić
- (Turkey) Melih Mahmutoğlu
- (Turkey) (Republic of Ireland) Metecan Birsen
- (Serbia) Nemanja Bjelica
- (Turkey) Oğuz Savaş
- (Turkey) Ömer Onan (C)
- (United States) Pierre Jackson (**)
- General Manager: (Italy) Maurizio Gherardini
- Head coach: (Serbia) Željko Obradović
- Manager: (Turkey) (Bosnia and Herzegovina) (Serbia) Mirsad Türkcan

(*) Loaned out to Royal Halı Gaziantep for second half of the season.
(**) Played only one Turkish Basketball League and two EuroLeague games.

=== 2014/15 ===
Titles

- Euroleague Final Four
- (Turkey) Turkish Cup Runner-up
- (Turkey) Turkish President's Cup Runner-up

Roster

- (United States) Andrew Goudelock
- (Turkey) Ayberk Olmaz (*)
- (Turkey) Berk Uğurlu
- (Serbia) Bogdan Bogdanović
- (Turkey) Can Altıntığ (*)
- (Turkey) (Slovenia) (Bosnia and Herzegovina) Emir Preldžič (C)
- (Turkey) İzzet Türkyılmaz (*)
- (Czech Republic) Jan Veselý
- (Turkey) (Kosovo) Kenan Sipahi
- (Croatia) Luka Žorić
- (Turkey) Melih Mahmutoğlu
- (Turkey) (Republic of Ireland) Metecan Birsen (*)
- (Serbia) Nemanja Bjelica
- (Greece) Nikolaos Zisis
- (Turkey) Oğuz Savaş
- (Turkey) Ömer Faruk Yurtseven
- (Georgia (country)) (United States) Ricky Hickman
- (Turkey) (Bosnia and Herzegovina) Semih Erden
- (Turkey) Serhat Çetin
- General Manager: (Italy) Maurizio Gherardini
- Head coach: (Serbia) Željko Obradović
- Manager: (Turkey) Ömer Onan

(*) Players loaned out in season.

=== 2015/16 ===
Titles

- Euroleague Runner-up
- (Turkey) Turkish League
- (Turkey) Turkish Cup

Roster

- (Turkey) Ayberk Olmaz (*)
- (Turkey) Barış Hersek
- (Turkey) Berk Uğurlu
- (Turkey) (United States) Bobby Dixon
- (Serbia) Bogdan Bogdanović
- (Turkey) Egehan Arna
- (Nigeria) (United States) Ekpe Udoh
- (Turkey) Ercan Bayrak
- (Czech Republic) Jan Veselý
- (Turkey) (Kosovo) Kenan Sipahi (*)
- (Greece) Kostas Sloukas
- (Italy) Luigi Datome
- (Turkey) Melih Mahmutoğlu (C)
- (Serbia) Nikola Kalinić
- (Turkey) Ömer Faruk Yurtseven (**)
- (North Macedonia) (Serbia) (Bulgaria) Pero Antić
- (Georgia (country)) (United States) Ricky Hickman
- General Manager: (Italy) Maurizio Gherardini
- Head coach: (Serbia) Željko Obradović
- Manager: (Turkey) Ömer Onan

(*) Players loaned out in season.
(**) Out of squad by coach decision about discipline problem.

=== 2016/17 ===
Titles

- Euroleague
- (Turkey) Turkish League
- (Turkey) Turkish President's Cup

Roster

- (Jordan) (Turkey) Ahmet Düverioğlu
- (Turkey) Ahmet Can Duran
- (Canada) (Jamaica) Anthony Bennett
- (Turkey) Barış Hersek
- (Turkey) Berk Uğurlu
- (Turkey) (United States) Bobby Dixon
- (Serbia) Bogdan Bogdanović
- (Turkey) Egehan Arna
- (Nigeria) (United States) Ekpe Udoh
- (Turkey) Ercan Bayrak
- (United States) James Nunnally
- (Czech Republic) Jan Veselý
- (Greece) Kostas Sloukas
- (Italy) Luigi Datome
- (Turkey) Melih Mahmutoğlu (C)
- (Serbia) Nikola Kalinić
- (North Macedonia) (Serbia) (Bulgaria) Pero Antić
- (Bulgaria) Yordan Minchev (*)
- General Manager: (Italy) Maurizio Gherardini
- Head coach: (Serbia) Željko Obradović

(*) Players loaned out in season.

=== 2017/18 ===
Titles

- Euroleague Runner-up
- (Turkey) Turkish League
- (Turkey) Turkish President's Cup

Roster

- (Jordan) (Turkey) Ahmet Düverioğlu
- (Turkey) Ahmet Can Duran
- (Turkey) Barış Hersek
- (Turkey) (United States) Bobby Dixon
- (United States) Brad Wanamaker
- (Turkey) Egehan Arna
- (United States) James Nunnally
- (Czech Republic) Jan Veselý
- (United States) Jason Thompson
- (Greece) Kostas Sloukas
- (Italy) Luigi Datome
- (Turkey) Melih Mahmutoğlu (C)
- (Serbia) Marko Gudurić
- (Serbia) Nikola Kalinić
- (Italy) Nicolò Melli
- (Turkey) Sinan Güler
- (Bulgaria) Yordan Minchev (*)
- General Manager: (Italy) Maurizio Gherardini
- Head coach: (Serbia) Željko Obradović
- Assistant coach: (Spain) Josep Maria Izquierdo
- Assistant coach: (Serbia) Vladimir Androić
- Assistant coach: (Turkey) Erdem Can
- Assistant coach: (Turkey) Berkay Oğuz

(*) Players loaned out in season.

=== 2018/19 ===
Titles

- Euroleague Final Four
- (Turkey) Turkish President's Cup

Roster

- (Jordan) (Turkey) Ahmet Düverioğlu
- (Turkey) Barış Hersek
- (Turkey) (United States) Bobby Dixon
- (Turkey) Egehan Arna
- (Turkey) Ergi Tırpancı
- (United States) Erick Green
- (Czech Republic) Jan Veselý
- (France) Joffrey Lauvergne
- (Greece) Kostas Sloukas
- (Italy) Luigi Datome
- (Turkey) Melih Mahmutoğlu (C)
- (Serbia) Marko Gudurić
- (Serbia) Nikola Kalinić
- (Italy) Nicolò Melli
- (Turkey) Sinan Güler
- (Turkey) (Bosnia and Herzegovina) Tarık Biberović
- (Canada) Tyler Ennis
- (Bulgaria) Yordan Minchev (*)
- General Manager: (Italy) Maurizio Gherardini
- Head coach: (Serbia) Željko Obradović
- Assistant coach: (Spain) Josep Maria Izquierdo
- Assistant coach: (Serbia) Vladimir Androić
- Assistant coach: (Turkey) Erdem Can
- Assistant coach: (Turkey) Berkay Oğuz

(*) Players loaned out in season.

=== 2019/20 ===
Titles

- (Turkey) Turkish Cup

Roster

- (Jordan) (Turkey) Ahmet Düverioğlu
- (Turkey) Berkay Candan
- (Turkey) (United States) Bobby Dixon
- (United States) Derrick Williams
- (Turkey) Egehan Arna
- (Turkey) Ekrem Sancaklı
- (Turkey) Ergi Tırpancı
- (United States) James Nunnally
- (Czech Republic) Jan Veselý
- (France) Joffrey Lauvergne
- (Greece) Kostas Sloukas
- (France) Léo Westermann
- (Italy) Luigi Datome
- (United States) Malcolm Thomas
- (Turkey) Melih Mahmutoğlu (C)
- (France) Nando de Colo
- (Serbia) Nikola Kalinić
- (Turkey) (Bosnia and Herzegovina) Tarık Biberović
- (Serbia) ~~Vladimir Štimac~~
- General Manager: (Italy) Maurizio Gherardini
- Head coach: (Serbia) Željko Obradović
- Assistant coach: (Spain) Josep Maria Izquierdo
- Assistant coach: (Serbia) Vladimir Androić
- Assistant coach: (Turkey) Erdem Can
- Assistant coach: (Turkey) Berkay Oğuz

~~crossed out~~ written players are leave the club in regular season.

== 2020 Era ==
=== 2020/21 ===
Roster

- (Jordan) (Turkey) Ahmet Düverioğlu
- (Mexico) Alex Pérez
- (Turkey) Berkay Candan
- (Turkey) (United States) Bobby Dixon
- (Germany) Danilo Barthel
- (Canada) Dyshawn Pierre
- (Lithuania) Edgaras Ulanovas
- (Turkey) Ekrem Sancaklı (*)
- (Czech Republic) Jan Veselý
- (United States) Jarell Eddie
- (Trinidad and Tobago) Johnny Hamilton (*)
- (Turkey) (Kosovo) Kenan Sipahi (*)
- (United States) Kyle O'Quinn
- (France) ~~Léo Westermann~~
- (United States) Lorenzo Brown
- (Serbia) Marko Gudurić
- (Turkey) Melih Mahmutoğlu (C)
- (France) Nando de Colo
- (Turkey) (Bosnia and Herzegovina) Tarık Biberović
- (Turkey) Yiğit Onan
- General Manager: (Italy) Maurizio Gherardini
- Head coach: (Serbia) Igor Kokoškov
- Assistant coach: (Slovenia) Rado Trifunović
- Assistant coach: (Turkey) Erdem Can
- Assistant coach: (Turkey) Serhan Aydanarığ
- Assistant coach: (Turkey) Berkay Oğuz

(*) Players loaned out in season.
~~crossed out~~ written players are leave the club in regular season.

=== 2021/22 ===
Titles

- (Turkey) Turkish League

Roster

- (Italy) Achille Polonara
- (Jordan) (Turkey) Ahmet Düverioğlu
- (Germany) Danilo Barthel
- (United States) Devin Booker
- (Canada) Dyshawn Pierre
- (Turkey) Ekrem Sancaklı
- (Turkey) (Germany) İsmet Akpınar
- (Czech Republic) Jan Veselý
- (United States) Jehyve Floyd
- (Canada) ~~Marial Shayok~~
- (United States) Markel Starks
- (Serbia) Marko Gudurić
- (Turkey) Melih Mahmutoğlu (C)
- (Turkey) (Republic of Ireland) Metecan Birsen
- (France) Nando de Colo
- (Senegal) (United States) Pierriá Henry
- (Turkey) Şehmus Hazer
- (Turkey) (Bosnia and Herzegovina) Tarık Biberović
- General Director: (Italy) Maurizio Gherardini
- Head coach: (Serbia) Aleksandar Đorđević
- Assistant coach: (Croatia) Goran Bjedov
- Assistant coach: (Slovenia) Rado Trifunović
- Assistant coach: (Turkey) Serhan Aydanarığ
- Assistant coach: (Turkey) Berkay Oğuz
- Assistant coach: (Turkey) Alp Timuçin Yeter

~~crossed out~~ written players are leave the club in regular season.

=== 2022/23 ===
Roster

- (United States) Carsen Edwards
- (United States) Devin Booker
- (Canada) Dyshawn Pierre
- (Turkey) Ekrem Sancaklı
- (Turkey) (Germany) İsmet Akpınar
- (United States) Johnathan Motley
- (Greece) (Nigeria) Kostas Antetokounmpo
- (Serbia) Marko Gudurić
- (Turkey) Melih Mahmutoğlu (C)
- (Turkey) (Republic of Ireland) Metecan Birsen
- (Serbia) Nemanja Bjelica
- (Greece) (United States) Nick Calathes
- (United States) Nigel Hayes-Davis
- (Turkey) Samet Geyik
- (Turkey) (United States) Scottie Wilbekin
- (Turkey) Şehmus Hazer
- (Turkey) (Bosnia and Herzegovina) Tarık Biberović
- (Nigeria) Tonye Jekiri
- (Greece) (United States) Tyler Dorsey
- General Director: (Italy) Maurizio Gherardini
- Head coach: (Greece) Dimitris Itoudis
- Assistant coach: (Greece) Stefanos Dedas
- Assistant coach: (Turkey) Erdem Bilmen
- Assistant coach: (Slovenia) Rado Trifunović
- Assistant coach: (Turkey) Serhan Aydanarığ
- Assistant coach: (Turkey) Berkay Oğuz
- Assistant coach: (Turkey) Alp Timuçin Yeter

=== 2023/24 ===
Titles

- Euroleague Final Four
- (Turkey) Turkish League
- (Turkey) Turkish Cup

Roster

- (Latvia) Artūrs Žagars (*)
- (France) Amine Noua
- (Canada) Dyshawn Pierre
- (Greece) Georgios Papagiannis
- (United States) Johnathan Motley
- (Serbia) Marko Gudurić
- (Turkey) Melih Mahmutoğlu (C)
- (Turkey) Mert Emre Ekşioğlu (**)
- (Turkey) (Republic of Ireland) Metecan Birsen
- (United States) Nate Sestina
- (Serbia) ~~Nemanja Bjelica~~
- (Greece) (United States) Nick Calathes
- (United States) Nigel Hayes-Davis
- (Turkey) Ömer Ege Ziyaettin
- (Brazil) ~~Raul Neto~~
- (Turkey) (United States) Scottie Wilbekin
- (Turkey) Sertaç Şanlı
- (Turkey) Şehmus Hazer
- (Turkey) (Bosnia and Herzegovina) Tarık Biberović
- (Greece) (United States) Tyler Dorsey
- (Israel) Yam Madar
- (Turkey) Yiğit Hamza Mestoğlu (**)
- General Director: (Italy) Maurizio Gherardini
- Head coach: (Lithuania) Šarūnas Jasikevičius
- Assistant coach: (Turkey) Ertuğrul Erdoğan
- Assistant coach: (Lithuania) Tomas Masiulis
- Assistant coach: (Turkey) Erdem Bilmen
- Assistant coach: (Spain) David Garcia
- Assistant coach: (Turkey) Alp Timuçin Yeter

(*) Players loaned out in season.
(**) Players play for Fenerbahçe Koleji by dual license.
~~crossed out~~ written players are leave the club in regular season.

=== 2024/25 ===
Titles

- Euroleague
- (Turkey) Turkish League
- (Turkey) Turkish Cup

Roster

- (Latvia) Artūrs Žagars
- (Serbia) ~~Boban Marjanović~~
- (United States) Bonzie Colson
- (United States) Devon Hall
- (Canada) Dyshawn Pierre
- (United States) Errick McCollum
- (Turkey) ~~Erten Gazi~~
- (Angola) Jilson Bango
- (Canada) Khem Birch
- (Croatia) ~~Luka Šamanić~~
- (Serbia) Marko Gudurić
- (Turkey) Melih Mahmutoğlu (C)
- (Turkey) Mert Emre Ekşioğlu (*)
- (Turkey) (Republic of Ireland) Metecan Birsen
- (Italy) (United States) Nicolò Melli
- (United States) Nigel Hayes-Davis
- (Turkey) Ömer Ege Ziyaettin (*)
- (Turkey) (United States) Scottie Wilbekin
- (United States) ~~Skylar Mays~~
- (Turkey) Sertaç Şanlı
- (Turkey) (Bosnia and Herzegovina) Tarık Biberović
- (United States) Wade Baldwin IV
- (Turkey) Yiğit Hamza Mestoğlu (*)
- General Director: (Italy) Maurizio Gherardini
- Head coach: (Lithuania) Šarūnas Jasikevičius
- Assistant coach: (Turkey) Ertuğrul Erdoğan
- Assistant coach: (Lithuania) Tomas Masiulis
- Assistant coach: (Turkey) Erdem Bilmen
- Assistant coach: (Spain) David Garcia
- Assistant coach: (Turkey) Alp Timuçin Yeter

(*) Players play for Fenerbahçe Koleji by dual license.
~~crossed out~~ written players are leave the club in regular season.

=== 2025/26 ===
Titles

- (Turkey) Turkish President's Cup
- (Turkey) Turkish Cup

Roster

- (United States) Armando Bacot
- (Latvia) Artūrs Žagars
- (United States) Bonzie Colson
- (United States) Brandon Boston Jr.
- (Gabon) Chris Silva
- (United States) Devon Hall
- (Angola) Jilson Bango
- (Canada) Khem Birch
- (Turkey) Melih Mahmutoğlu (C)
- (Turkey) Mert Emre Ekşioğlu (*)
- (Turkey) (Republic of Ireland) Metecan Birsen
- (Finland) Mikael Jantunen
- (France) Nando De Colo
- (Italy) (United States) Nicolò Melli
- (Turkey) Onuralp Bitim
- (Turkey) (United States) ~~Scottie Wilbekin~~
- (United States) Talen Horton-Tucker
- (Turkey) (Bosnia and Herzegovina) Tarık Biberović
- (United States) Wade Baldwin IV
- (Turkey) Yiğit Hamza Mestoğlu (*)
- General Director: (Turkey) Derya Yannier
- Head coach: (Lithuania) Šarūnas Jasikevičius
- Assistant coach: (Turkey) Ertuğrul Erdoğan
- Assistant coach: (Lithuania) Kazys Maksvytis
- Assistant coach: (Turkey) Erdem Bilmen
- Assistant coach: (Spain) David Garcia
- Assistant coach: (Turkey) Alp Timuçin Yeter

(*) Players play for Fenerbahçe Koleji by dual license.
~~crossed out~~ written players are leave the club in regular season.

=== 2026/27 ===
Titles

- (Turkey) Turkish President's Cup

Roster

- (United States) Braxton Key
- (Gabon) ~~Chris Silva~~
- (Canada) Dwight Powell
- (Lithuania) Ignas Sargiūnas
- (United States) Johnny Juzang
- (United States) Marcus Bingham Jr.
- (Turkey) Melih Mahmutoğlu (C)
- (Italy) (United States) Nicolò Melli
- (Turkey) Onuralp Bitim
- (Turkey) Sertaç Şanlı
- (Turkey) (United States) Shane Larkin
- (Denmark) (United States) Shavon Shields
- (United States) Talen Horton-Tucker
- (United States) Trent Forrest
- (United States) Will Clyburn
- (United States) Wade Baldwin IV
- General Director: (Turkey) Derya Yannier
- Head coach: (Lithuania) Šarūnas Jasikevičius
- Assistant coach: (Turkey) Ertuğrul Erdoğan
- Assistant coach: (Lithuania) Kazys Maksvytis
- Assistant coach: (Turkey) Erdem Bilmen
- Assistant coach: (Spain) David Garcia
- Assistant coach: (Turkey) Alp Timuçin Yeter

(*) Players play for Fenerbahçe Koleji by dual license.
~~crossed out~~ written players are leave the club in regular season.

== See also ==
See also Fenerbahçe (women's basketball) past rosters
