= 1989–90 Galatasaray S.K. (men's basketball) season =

Galatasaray SK
1989–90 season
- Chairman: (Turkey) Ali Tanrıyar, Alp Yalman
- Manager: (Turkey) Faruk Akagün
- Turkish Basketball League: 1st

Galatasaray SK Men's 1989–1990 season is the 1989–1990 basketball season for Turkish professional basketball club Galatasaray SK.

The club competes in:

- Turkish Basketball League

== Depth chart ==
Pos.	Starting 5	Bench 1	Bench 2
C	Emir Turam	Yusuf Erboy	Hüseyin Buğdaycı
PF	Pete Williams	Cem Usta	Yalçın Küçüközkan
SF	Lütfü Arıboğan	Burçin Badem
SG	Hakan Yörükoğlu	Cem Usta	Cem Caniklioğlu
PG	Ömer Kart	Recep Şen

== Squad changes for the 1989–1990 season ==
In: Note: Flags indicate national team as defined under FIFA eligibility rules; some limited exceptions apply. Players may hold more than one non-FIFA nationality.

No.	Pos.	Nation	Player
-	PF	USA	Pete Williams (from Fenerbahçe)
-	PF	TUR	Emir Turam (from Anadolu Efes)
-	PF	TUR	Hakan Yörükoğlu (from Anadolu Efes)
-	PF	TUR	Yalçın Küçüközkan (from Anadolu Efes)

Out: Note: Flags indicate national team as defined under FIFA eligibility rules; some limited exceptions apply. Players may hold more than one non-FIFA nationality.

No.	Pos.	Nation	Player
-		TUR	Mehmet Ali Tlabar (to)
-		USA	Arthur Housey (to)
-		USA	Paul Dawkins (to)
-		TUR	Fatih Özal (to)
-		TUR	Ferhat Oktay (to)
-		TUR	Çağatay Çırpıcıoğlu (to)
-		TUR	Ömer Büyükaycan (to)
-		TUR	Ekrem Memnun (to)
-		USA	Weiss (to)

== Results, schedules and standings ==
=== Turkish Basketball League 1989–90 ===
==== Regular season ====
Pos	Team	Total					
		Pts	Pld	W	L	F	A
1	Fenerbahçe	41	22	19	3	1928	1622
2	Galatasaray SK	40	22	18	4	1994	1722
3	Çukurova Sanayi	36	22	14	8	1919	1718
4	Anadolu Efes	35	22	13	9	1852	1670
5	Beslen SK	35	22	13	9	2027	1896
6	Paşabahçe SK	35	22	13	9	1911	1681
7	İTÜ B.K.	33	22	11	11	1980	1848
8	Karşıyaka	31	22	9	13	1787	1625
9	Beşiktaş	31	22	9	13	1950	1814
10	Nasaş	30	22	8	14	1910	1807
11	Eczacıbaşı SK	27	22	5	17	1728	1719
12	SB Beykoz	22	22	0	22	939	2803

Pts=Points, Pld=Matches played, W=Matches won, L=Matches lost, F=Points for, A=Points against

===== 1st Half =====
October 7, 1989
16:30 TSI

(Report)

Nasaş	81–86	Galatasaray SK
Scoring by half: 40–47, 41–39
Pts: Noyan Özler 27, Remzi Dilli 14		Pts: Pete Williams 26, Yalçın Küçüközkan 16

Atatürk Spor Salonu, Kocaeli
Attendance: unknown

October 13, 1989
17:30

(Report)

Galatasaray SK	68–80	Fenerbahçe
Scoring by half: 32–39, 36–41
Pts: Pete Williams 17, Lütfü Arıboğan 16		Pts: Larry Richard 27, Fatih Özal 21

Abdi İpekçi Arena, Istanbul
Attendance: unknown

October 21, 1989
16:30 TSI

(Report)

Galatasaray SK	90–77	Beşiktaş
Scoring by half: 40–31, 50–46
Pts: Lütfü Arıboğan 19, Emir Turam 17		Pts: Andre Braden 23, Erman Şahbazoğlu 15

Abdi İpekçi Arena, Istanbul
Attendance: unknown

October 28, 1989
16:30 TSI

(Report)

Anadolu Efes	72–73	Galatasaray SK
Scoring by half: 34–37, 38–36
Pts: Taner Korucu 17, Levent Topsakal 15		Pts: Pete Williams 26, Cem Caniklioglu 16

Lütfü Kırdar, Istanbul
Attendance: unknown

November 5, 1989
16:30 TSI

(Report)

Galatasaray SK	136–39	Sümerbank Beykoz
Scoring by half: 71–15, 65–24
Pts: Burçin Badem 33, Cem Usta 25, Yalçın Küçüközkan 17		Pts: Özgenç Genç 12, Hakan Aşkın 11

Lütfü Kırdar, Istanbul
Attendance: unknown

November 11, 1989

(Report)

Karşıyaka	82–84	Galatasaray SK
Scoring by half: 41–42, 41–42
Pts: Kemal Ziya Uyanik 30, Franklin Giles 15		Pts: Emir Turam 23, Hakan Yörükoğlu 21

Atatürk Spor Salonu, İzmir
Attendance: unknown

November 17, 1989
17:30

(Report)

Galatasaray SK	84–71	Çukurova Sanayi
Scoring by half: 50–32, 34–39
Pts: Emir Turam 24, Pete Williams 21		Pts: Serdar Apaydın 15, Murat Aşkın 13

Lütfü Kırdar, Istanbul
Attendance: unknown

November 25, 1989
16:30

(Report)

Galatasaray SK	101–89	Eczacıbaşı SK
Scoring by half: 56–45, 45–44
Pts: Hakan Yörükoğlu 28, Pete Williams 21		Pts: Thomas Jordan 22, Rüçhan Tamsöz 24

Lütfü Kırdar, Istanbul
Attendance: unknown

December 3, 1989
18:30

(Report)

Galatasaray SK	92–88 (OT)	İTÜ B.K.
Scoring by half: 39–45, 46–40 Overtime: 7-3
Pts: Pete Williams 28, Lütfü Arıboğan 21		Pts: Okan Gedik 22, Harun Erdenay 30

Caferağa Spor Salonu, Istanbul
Attendance: unknown

December 9, 1989
15:00

(Report)

Galatasaray SK	97–96	Beslen SK
Scoring by half: 47–59, 50–37
Pts: Pete Williams 24, Hakan Yörükoğlu 23		Pts: Freeman Green 28, Tunç Girgin 22

Lütfü Kırdar, Istanbul
Attendance: unknown

December 17, 1989
15:00 TSI

(Report)

Galatasaray SK	83–71	Paşabahçe SK
Scoring by half: 50–32, 33–39
Pts: Pete Williams 24, Hakan Yörükoğlu 13		Pts: Martin Embry 18, Turhan Koray 16

Abdi İpekçi Arena, Istanbul
Attendance: unknown

===== 2nd Half =====
January 6, 1990
16:30

(Report)

Galatasaray SK	82–70	Nasaş
Scoring by half: 36–31, 46–39
Pts: Hakan Yörükoğlu 26, Emir Turam 14		Pts: Troy Bowers 16, Noyan Özler 13

Lütfü Kırdar, Istanbul
Attendance: unknown

January 13, 1990
17:00

(Report)

Fenerbahçe	79–71	Galatasaray SK
Scoring by half: 40–37, 39–34
Pts: Can Sonat 18, Fatih Özal 17		Pts: Cem Caniklioğlu 19, Pete Williams 28

Abdi İpekçi Arena, Istanbul
Attendance: unknown

January 18, 1990
17:30

(Report)

Beşiktaş	88–90	Galatasaray SK
Scoring by half: 45–51, 43–39
Pts: Erman Kunter 36, Erman Şahbazoğlu 17		Pts: Pete Williams 21, Hakan Yörükoğlu 20

Abdi İpekçi Arena, Istanbul
Attendance: unknown

February 3, 1990
16:30

(Report)

Sümerbank Beykoz	30–135	Galatasaray SK
Scoring by half: 17–67, 13–68
Pts: Bulent Mutu 11		Pts: Yalçın Kücüközkan 52, Yusuf Erboy 17

Lütfü Kırdar, Istanbul
Attendance: unknown

February 9, 1990
18:00

(Report)

Galatasaray SK	89–82	Karşıyaka
Scoring by half: 50–45, 39–37
Pts: Lütfü Arıboğan 28, Hakan Yörükoğlu 19		Pts: Kemal Ziya Uyanik 25, Franklin Giles 23

Lütfü Kırdar, Istanbul
Attendance: unknown

February 17, 1990
16:30

(Report)

Çukurova Sanayi	71–77	Galatasaray SK
Scoring by half: 37–38, 34–39
Pts: Anthony Lee 28, Behcet Uner 13		Pts: Cem Caniklioglu 18, Pete Williams 17

Edip Buran, Mersin
Attendance: unknown

February 24, 1990
18:00

(Report)

Eczacıbaşı SK	74–82	Galatasaray SK
Scoring by half: 44–51, 30–31
Pts: Murat Şener 18, Herbert Johnson 17		Pts: Cem Caniklioglu 16, Pete Williams 19

Lütfü Kırdar, Istanbul
Attendance: unknown

March 3, 1990
16:30

(Report)

İTÜ B.K.	99–91	Galatasaray SK
Scoring by half: 44–49, 55–42
Pts: Anthony Spencer 35, Harun Erdenay 23		Pts: Pete Williams 21, Lütfü Arıboğan 18

Istanbul, Turkey
Attendance: unknown

March 7, 1990
18:00

(Report)

Efes Pilsen S.K.	87–91	Galatasaray SK
Scoring by half: 50–41, 37–50
Pts: Glynn Blackwell 26, Taner Korucu 15		Pts: Pete Williams 22, Hakan Yörükoğlu 25

Lütfü Kırdar, Istanbul
Attendance: unknown

March 11, 1990

(Report)

Galatasaray SK	106–114	Beslen SK
Scoring by half: 51–64, 55–50
Pts: Pete Williams 24, Lütfü Arıboğan 27		Pts: Murat Evliyaoğlu 39, Lester Pace 20

Kamil Ocak, Gaziantep
Attendance: unknown

March 17, 1990
16:30

(Report)

Galatasaray SK	86–82	Paşabahçe SK
Scoring by half: 53–44, 33–38
Pts: Hakan Yörükoğlu 21, Recep Şen 17		Pts: İhsan Bayülken 21, Ufuk Pek 13

Lütfü Kırdar, Istanbul
Attendance: unknown

==== Playoffs ====
===== Quarter-finals Group =====
Pos	Team	Total					
		Pts	Pld	W	L	F	A
1	Anadolu Efes	9	5	4	1	398	381
2	Paşabahçe SK	8	5	3	2	432	385
3	Çukurova Sanayi	7	5	2	3	400	427
4	Tofaş SAS	7	5	2	3	407	423
5	İTÜ B.K.	7	5	2	3	395	412
6	Beslen SK	7	5	2	3	435	439

Fenerbahçe and Galatasaray joined semi-finals automatically. Tofaş SAS, the second league winner, joined play off quarter finals. Efes Pilsen and Paşabahçe SK qualified for the semi-finals after the matches in Ankara.

===== Semi-finals =====
April 24, 1990
15:30 TSI

(Report)

Galatasaray SK	76–71	Anadolu Efes
Scoring by half: 36–36, 40–35
Pts: Hakan Yörükoğlu 21, Lütfü Arıboğan 19, Cem Caniklioğlu 15, Pete Williams 12		Pts: Tamer Oyguç 24, Levent Topsakal 14, Lowell Hamilton 14

Lütfü Kırdar, Istanbul
Attendance: unknown

April 26, 1990
15:30 TSI

(Report)

Galatasaray SK	83–79	Anadolu Efes
Pts: Cem Caniklioğlu 29, Lütfü Arıboğan 17		Pts: Levent Topsakal 21, Taner Korucu 19

Lütfü Kırdar, Istanbul
Attendance: unknown

===== Finals =====
May 2, 1990
15:00 TSI

(Report)

Galatasaray SK	88–81	Paşabahçe SK
Scoring by half: 46–39, 42–42
Pts: Hakan Yörükoğlu 25, Cem Caniklioğlu 19, Pete Williams 17, Arıboğan 13		Pts: Ömer Saybir 23, Martin Embry 19

Lütfü Kırdar, Istanbul
Attendance: unknown

May 4, 1990
15:00 TSI

(Report)

Paşabahçe SK	96–79	Galatasaray SK
Scoring by half: 47–46, 49–33
Pts: Martin Embry 29, Orhun Ene 27, Ömer Saybir 20		Pts: Pete Williams 22, Cem Caniklioğlu 18

Abdi İpekçi Arena, Istanbul
Attendance: unknown

May 6, 1990
13:00 TSI

(Report)

Galatasaray SK	83–77	Paşabahçe SK
Scoring by half: 43–39, 40–38
Pts: Hakan Yörükoğlu 28, Cem Caniklioğlu 18, Pete Williams 15, Arıboğan 11		Pts: Ufuk Pek 16, Martin Embry 19

Malatya Sports Hall, Malatya
Attendance: unknown

May 9, 1990
15:00 TSI

(Report)

Galatasaray SK	73–70	Paşabahçe SK
Scoring by half: 35–41, 38–29
Pts: Hakan Yörükoğlu 10, Cem Caniklioğlu 18, Pete Williams 16, Arıboğan 14		Pts: Ömer Saybir 16, Martin Embry 22

Atatürk Sports Hall, Adana
Attendance: unknown

=== President Cup ===
May 26, 1990
15:30 TSI

(Report)

Galatasaray SK	86–95	Fenerbahçe
Scoring by half: 57–53, 29–42
Pts: Hakan Yörükoğlu 28, Cem Caniklioğlu 22		Pts: Fatih Özal 24, Larry Richard 23

Lütfü Kırdar, Istanbul
Attendance: unknown
Referees: Gökhan Günalp, Necip Kapanlı
