= 2009–10 Fenerbahçe Ülker Euroleague =

Fenerbahçe Ülker is the professional men's basketball department of Fenerbahçe S.K., a major multisport club based in Istanbul, Turkey.

For the season roster: 2009-10 Roster

== Group A regular season ==
The Regular Season began on October 15, 2009, and concluded on January 14, 2010.

	Team	Pld	W	L	PF	PA	Diff	Tie-break
1.	(Spain) Regal FC Barcelona	10	10	0	833	625	+208	
2.	(Italy) Montepaschi Siena	10	8	2	830	689	+141	
3.	(Lithuania) Žalgiris Kaunas	10	3	7	673	739	−66	3–3, +6
4.	(Croatia) Cibona Zagreb	10	3	7	637	742	−105	3–3, +2
5.	(France) ASVEL Villeurbanne	10	3	7	680	749	−69	3–3, −3
6.	(Turkey) Fenerbahçe Ülker	10	3	7	690	799	−109	3–3, −5

== Fixtures/results ==
All times given below are in Central European Time.

Unless otherwise indicated, all attendance totals are from the corresponding match report posted on the official Euroleague site and included with each game summary.

21 October 2009
18:45

Report

Fenerbahçe Ülker (Turkey)	59–82	(Spain) Regal FC Barcelona
Scoring by quarter: 11-19, 10-19, 17-24, 21-20
Pts: Solomon 16; Rebs: Erden, Aşık, Preldžič 3 Asts: Giriček, Greer, Savaş 2		Pts: Mickeal 26; Rebs: Vázquez, Morris, Mickeal 7 Asts: Rubio, 9

Abdi İpekçi Arena
Attendance: 1,000
Referees: Luigi Lamonica(ITA), Milivoje Jovčić (SRB), Sergiy Zashchuck (UKR)

28 October 2009
20:30

Report

ASVEL Villeurbanne (France)	76–78 (OT) (OT)	(Turkey) Fenerbahçe Ülker
Scoring by quarter: 12-12, 12-17, 22-26, 18-9, Overtime: 12-14
Pts: Traore 29; Rebs: Traore 13; Asts: Lukauskis, Dixon 5		Pts: Kinsey 21; Rebs: Aşık 10; Asts: Greer 4

Astroballe
Attendance: 5,601
Referees: Fabio Facchini (ITA), Tomas Jasevicius (LTU), Seffi Shemmesh (ISR)

4 November 2009
19:15

Report

Fenerbahçe Ülker (Turkey)	67–62	(Croatia) Cibona Zagreb
Scoring by quarter: 11-18, 21-14, 17-11, 18-19
Pts: Savaş 14; Rebs: Savaş 10; Asts: Preldžič 5		Pts: Gordon 15; Rebs: Radošević 6 Asts: Gordon 6

Abdi İpekçi Arena
Attendance: 1,000
Referees: Emilio Pérez Pizarro (ESP), Vicente Bulto (ESP), Damir Javor (SLO)

11 November 2009
19:15

Report

Fenerbahçe Ülker (Turkey)	83–87	(Italy) Montepaschi Siena
Scoring by quarter: 30-21, 20-28, 11-16, 22-22
Pts: Kinsey 20; Rebs: Savaş 7 Asts: Savaş 5		Pts: McIntyre 25; Rebs: Eze 7 Asts: Hawkins 6

Abdi İpekçi Arena
Attendance: 1,000
Referees: Saša Pukl (SLO), Fernando Rocha (POR), Antonio Conde (ESP)

25 November 2009
18:45

Report

Žalgiris Kaunas (Lithuania)	78–84	(Turkey) Fenerbahçe Ülker
Scoring by quarter: 24-23, 19-14, 14-22, 21-25
Pts: Pocius 19; Rebs: Watson 9 Asts: Kalnietis 6		Pts: Mršić 16; Rebs: Erden 6 Asts: Mršić, Greer 5

S. Darius and S. Girėnas Hall
Attendance: 4,315
Referees: Christos Christodoulou (GRE), Juan Carlos Garcia Gonzalez (ESP), Oscar Perea (ESP)

3 December 2009
20:45

Report

Regal FC Barcelona (Spain)	89–55	(Turkey) Fenerbahçe Ülker
Scoring by quarter: 15-6, 27-15, 25-15, 22-19
Pts: Lakovič, Vázquez 14; Rebs: Morris 7 Asts: Navarro 5		Pts: Greer 13; Rebs: Aşık 7 Asts: Başak, Aşık 2

Palau Blaugrana
Attendance: 4,227
Referees: Zoran Šutulović (MNE), Borys Ryzhyk (UKR), Olegs Latisevs (LAT)

9 December 2009
19:15

Report

Fenerbahçe Ülker (Turkey)	61–68	(France) ASVEL Villeurbanne
Scoring by quarter: 16-14, 18-16, 13-19, 14-19
Pts: Greer, Aşık 11; Rebs: Erden, Aşık, Preldžič 7 Asts: Preldžič 4		Pts: Kangur 16; Rebs: Marshall 6 Asts: Lukauskis, Kangur, Dixon 3

Ayhan Şahenk Arena
Attendance: 800
Referees: Guerrino Cerebuch (ITA), Matej Boltauzer (SLO), Sergiy Chebyshev (UKR)

16 December 2009
18:30

Report

Cibona Zagreb (Croatia)	80–77	(Turkey) Fenerbahçe Ülker
Scoring by quarter: 12-20, 20-16, 26-22, 22-19
Pts: Tomas 28; Rebs: Andrić 6 Asts: Princ, Rozić 3		Pts: Kinsey 21; Rebs: Erden 8 Asts: Kinsey 3

Dražen Petrović Basketball Hall
Attendance: 3,500
Referees: Juan Carlos Arteaga (ESP), Antonio Conde (ESP), Panagiotis Anastopoulos (GRE)

6 January 2010
18:30

Report

Montepaschi Siena (Italy)	101–58	(Turkey) Fenerbahçe Ülker
Scoring by quarter: 19-14, 31-11, 28-14, 23-19
Pts: Lavrinovič 20; Rebs: Lavrinovič 6 Asts: Hawkins 5		Pts: Greer 18; Rebs: Savaş 5 Asts: Preldžič 3

Palasport Mens Sana
Attendance: 4,077
Referees: Grzegorz Ziemblicki(POL), Ilija Belošević (SRB), Eddie Viator (FRA)

14 January 2010
20:00

Report

Fenerbahçe Ülker (Turkey)	68–76	(Lithuania) Žalgiris Kaunas
Scoring by quarter: 19-23, 18-20, 14-25, 17-8
Pts: Ukić 20; Rebs: Erden 10; Asts: Ukić 4		Pts: Pocius 18; Rebs: Brown 5 Asts: Pocius, Brown 4

Abdi İpekçi Arena
Attendance: 3,400
Referees: Fabio Facchini (ITA), Sreten Radovic (CRO), Luis Lopes (POR)
