= 2007–08 Fenerbahçe Ülker Euroleague =

Fenerbahçe Ülker is the professional men's basketball department of Fenerbahçe S.K., a major multisport club based in Istanbul, Turkey.

For the season roster: 2007-08 Roster

== Euroleague 2007-08 ==
=== Regular season Group C ===
	Team	Pld	W	L	PF	PA	Diff
1.	(Greece) Panathinaikos	14	12	2	1156	1037	+119
2.	(Spain) Real Madrid	14	11	3	1137	1015	+122
3.	(Spain) AXA FC Barcelona	14	9	5	1082	991	+91
4.	(Turkey) Fenerbahçe Ülker	14	6	8	1087	1103	−26
5.	(Serbia) Partizan Belgrade	14	6	8	1100	1103	−3
6.	(Italy) Lottomatica Roma	14	6	8	1071	1093	−22
7.	(France) Roanne	14	4	10	1104	1224	−120
8.	(Germany) Brose Baskets	14	2	12	879	1040	−161

All times given below are in Central European Time.

Unless otherwise indicated, all attendance totals are from the corresponding match report posted on the official Euroleague site and included with each game summary.

October 25
19:15

(Report)

Fenerbahçe Ülker (Turkey)	72–80	(Spain) Real Madrid
Scoring by quarter: 10-30, 21-18, 26-20, 15-12

Abdi İpekçi Arena, Istanbul
Attendance: 5,000

November 1
20:45

(Report)

AXA FC Barcelona (Spain)	82–67	(Turkey) Fenerbahçe Ülker
Scoring by quarter: 26-13, 18-23, 15-16, 23-15

Palau Blaugrana, Barcelona
Attendance: 4,302

November 6
19:15

(Report)

Fenerbahçe Ülker (Turkey)	85–66	(Italy) Lottomatica Roma
Scoring by quarter: 20-10, 22-24, 23-13, 20-19

Abdi İpekçi Arena, Istanbul
Attendance: 1,200

November 14
20:30

(Report)

Roanne (France)	90–97	(Turkey) Fenerbahçe Ülker
Scoring by quarter: 33-24, 21-25, 12-20, 24-28

Maison des Sports, Clermont-Ferrand
Attendance: 2,000

November 22
19:15

(Report)

Fenerbahçe Ülker (Turkey)	79–77	(Germany) Brose Baskets
Scoring by quarter: 23-20, 9-16, 18-18, 29-23

Abdi İpekçi Arena, Istanbul
Attendance: 3,000

November 29
19:15

(Report)

Fenerbahçe Ülker (Turkey)	64–83	(Greece) Panathinaikos
Scoring by quarter: 20-19, 19-24, 5-22, 20-18

Abdi İpekçi Arena, Istanbul
Attendance: 4,500

December 5
20:45

(Report)

Partizan Belgrade (Serbia)	72–76	(Turkey) Fenerbahçe Ülker
Scoring by quarter: 16-20, 18-15, 18-20, 20-21

Pionir Hall, Belgrade
Attendance: 6,528

December 13
20:45

(Report)

Real Madrid (Spain)	87–77	(Turkey) Fenerbahçe Ülker
Scoring by quarter: 26-18, 21-15, 15-17, 25-27

Palacio Vistalegre, Madrid
Attendance: 6,000

December 20
19:15

(Report)

Fenerbahçe Ülker (Turkey)	78–85	(Spain) AXA FC Barcelona
Scoring by quarter: 15-21, 26-22, 15-20, 22-22

Abdi İpekçi Arena, Istanbul
Attendance: 5,000

January 3
20:30

(Report)

Lottomatica Roma (Italy)	63–84	(Turkey) Fenerbahçe Ülker
Scoring by quarter: 18-19, 14-23, 12-17, 19-25

PalaLottomatica, Rome
Attendance: 4,834

January 9
19:45

(Report)

Fenerbahçe Ülker (Turkey)	81–68	(France) Roanne
Scoring by quarter: 28-13, 16-23, 21-19, 16-13

Abdi İpekçi Arena, Istanbul
Attendance: 2,800

January 17
20:45

(Report)

Brose Baskets (Germany)	81–73	(Turkey) Fenerbahçe Ülker
Scoring by quarter: 23-12, 15-17, 14-16, 29-28

Jako Arena, Bamberg
Attendance: 6,800

January 24
19:45

(Report)

Panathinaikos (Greece)	88–68	(Turkey) Fenerbahçe Ülker
Scoring by quarter: 16-15, 26-14, 28-18, 18-21

Olympic Indoor Hall, Athens
Attendance: 10,000

January 31
20:00

(Report)

Fenerbahçe Ülker (Turkey)	86–91	(Serbia) Partizan Belgrade
Scoring by quarter: 27-18, 12-27, 26-22, 21-24

Abdi İpekçi Arena, Istanbul
Attendance: 5,000

=== Top 16 Group E ===
	Team	Pld	W	L	PF	PA	Diff
1.	(Spain) TAU Cerámica	6	5	1	510	467	+43
2.	(Turkey) Fenerbahçe Ülker	6	3	3	493	488	+5
3.	(Lithuania) Lietuvos Rytas Vilnius	6	2	4	506	507	−1
4.	(Greece) Aris Thessaloniki	6	2	4	448	495	−47

All times given below are in Central European Time.

Unless otherwise indicated, all attendance totals are from the corresponding match report posted on the official Euroleague site and included with each game summary.

February 14
19:45

(Report)

Aris Thessaloniki (Greece)	88–96	(Turkey) Fenerbahçe Ülker
Scoring by quarter: 21-29, 22-21, 17-20, 28-26
Pts: Wright, Massey 17; Rebs: Massey 13; Asts: Washington 5		Pts: Solomon 23; Rebs: Oğuz Savaş 6 Asts: Mršić 3

Alexandrio Melathron, Thessaloniki
Attendance: 5,000

February 20
20:30

(Report)

TAU Cerámica (Spain)	103–84	(Turkey) Fenerbahçe Ülker
Scoring by quarter: 25-17, 25-21, 24-18, 29-28
Pts: Rakočević, Vidal 14; Rebs: McDonald, Mickeal 7 Asts: Prigioni 7		Pts: Oğuz Savaş 20; Rebs: Ömer Aşık 7 Asts: Preldžič 3

Fernando Buesa Arena, Vitoria-Gasteiz
Attendance: 7,200

February 28
19:00

(Report)

Fenerbahçe Ülker (Turkey)	95–91 (OT) (OT)	(Lithuania) Lietuvos Rytas
Scoring by quarter: 25-27, 20-7, 10-29, 24-16, Overtime: 16-12
Pts: Solomon 27; Rebs: Kinsey, Ömer Aşık 7 Asts: Solomon 7		Pts: Bajramović 22; Rebs: Bajramović 9 Asts: Eidson 5

Abdi İpekçi Arena, Istanbul
Attendance: 1,500

March 5
19:15

(Report)

Fenerbahçe Ülker (Turkey)	59–60	(Greece) Aris Thessaloniki
Scoring by quarter: 15-22, 17-12, 13-16, 14-10
Pts: Solomon, Ömer Aşık 13; Rebs: Ömer Aşık 11; Asts: White 2		Pts: Massey 18; Rebs: Massey 8 Asts: Kalaitzis, Washington 3

Abdi İpekçi Arena, Istanbul
Attendance: 11,000

March 12
19:15

(Report)

Lietuvos Rytas (Lithuania)	87–84	(Turkey) Fenerbahçe Ülker
Scoring by quarter: 18-26, 20-20, 25-24, 24-14
Pts: Price 22; Rebs: Bajramović 7 Asts: Eidson, Bajramović 3		Pts: Kinsey 20; Rebs: Semih Erden, Ömer Aşık 5 Asts: Solomon 6

Siemens Arena, Vilnius
Attendance: 11,000

March 19
20:15

(Report)

Fenerbahçe Ülker (Turkey)	75–59	(Spain) TAU Cerámica
Scoring by quarter: 30-17, 13-13, 16-20, 16-9
Pts: Solomon 28; Rebs: Kinsey 6 Asts: Solomon 4		Pts: Splitter 21; Rebs: Splitter 7 Asts: Planinić 4

Abdi İpekçi Arena, Istanbul
Attendance: 10,000

=== Quarter final ===
Each quarterfinal is a best-of-three (if third serie necessary) series between a first-place team in the Top 16 and a second-place team from a different group, with the first-place team receiving home advantage. Quarterfinals will be played on April 1 and April 3, 2008, with third games to be played April 10 if necessary.

April 1
20:30

(Report)

Montepaschi Siena (Italy)	73–66	(Turkey) Fenerbahçe Ülker
Scoring by quarter: 23-16, 16-20, 16-15, 18-15
Pts: Lavrinovič 16; Rebs: Stonerook 8 Asts: McIntyre, Thornton 4		Pts: Semih Erden, Kinsey 12; Rebs: Preldžič 8 Asts: Preldžič 4

Palasport Mens Sana, Siena
Attendance: 6,500

April 3
19:15

(Report)

Fenerbahçe (Turkey)	65–86	(Italy) Montepaschi Siena
Scoring by quarter: 15-25, 19-12, 11-25, 20-24
Pts: Ömer Aşık 12; Rebs: Mirsad Türkcan 8 Asts: Will Solomon 3		Pts: Thornton, Lavrinovič 18; Rebs: Romain Sato 8 Asts: Terrell McIntyre 6
Montepaschi Siena won series, 2–0

Abdi İpekçi Arena, Istanbul
Attendance: 7,000
