= 2006–07 Fenerbahçe Ülker Euroleague =

Fenerbahçe Ülker is the professional men's basketball department of Fenerbahçe S.K., a major multisport club based in Istanbul, Turkey.

For the season roster: 2006-07 Roster

== Euroleague 2007-08 ==
=== Regular season Group C ===
	Team	Pld	W	L	PF	PA	Diff
1.	(Russia) CSKA Moscow	14	13	1	1079	912	167
2.	(Spain) Winterthur FC Barcelona	14	9	5	1093	1032	61
3.	(Italy) Benetton Treviso	14	8	6	1021	989	32
4.	(France) Pau-Orthez	14	7	7	1059	1070	-11
5.	(Greece) Aris TT Bank	14	6	8	971	1013	-42
6.	(Italy) Eldo Napoli	14	6	8	1032	1093	-61
7.	(Turkey) Fenerbahçe Ülker	14	5	9	1044	1088	-44
8.	(Lithuania) Žalgiris Kaunas	14	2	12	1062	1164	-102

Aris TT Bank (Greece)	66 – 58	(Turkey) Fenerbahçe Ülker	October 25, 2006

Fenerbahçe Ülker (Turkey)	66 – 68	(France) Pau-Orthez	November 1, 2006

Benetton Treviso (Italy)	93 – 83	(Turkey) Fenerbahçe Ülker	November 8, 2006

Fenerbahçe Ülker (Turkey)	84 – 75	(Lithuania) Žalgiris Kaunas	November 16, 2006

Winterthur FCB (Spain)	84 – 70	(Turkey) Fenerbahçe Ülker	November 23, 2006

Eldo Napoli (Italy)	78 – 83*	(Turkey) Fenerbahçe Ülker	November 30, 2006

Fenerbahçe Ülker (Turkey)	74 – 84	(Russia) CSKA Moscow	December 6, 2006

Fenerbahçe Ülker (Turkey)	80 – 86	(Greece) Aris TT Bank	December 13, 2006

Pau-Orthez (France)	89 – 67	(Turkey) Fenerbahçe Ülker	December 21, 2006

Fenerbahçe Ülker (Turkey)	70 – 58	(Italy) Benetton Treviso	January 3, 2007

Žalgiris Kaunas (Lithuania)	70 – 83	(Turkey) Fenerbahçe Ülker	January 11, 2007

Fenerbahçe Ülker (Turkey)	82 – 69	(Spain) Winterthur FCB	January 18, 2007

Fenerbahçe Ülker (Turkey)	88 – 93*	(Italy) Eldo Napoli	January 25, 2007

CSKA Moscow (Russia)	85 – 66	(Turkey) Fenerbahçe Ülker	January 31, 2007
