= Gulay =

Gulay Fərzəliyeva

- Gulay language
- Zeki Gülay

== See also ==
- Gulay-gorod
