= 2008–09 Fenerbahçe Ülker Euroleague =

Fenerbahçe Ülker is the professional men's basketball department of Fenerbahçe S.K., a major multisport club based in Istanbul, Turkey.

For the season roster: 2008-09 Roster

== Regular season ==
The Regular Season began on October 20, 2008 and concluded on January 15, 2009.

=== Group C ===
	Team	Pld	W	L	PF	PA	Diff
1.	(Spain) TAU Cerámica	10	8	2	916	808	+108
2.	(Italy) Lottomatica Roma	10	6	4	814	786	+28
3.	(Turkey) Fenerbahçe Ülker	10	6	4	779	755	+24
4.	(Germany) ALBA Berlin	10	4	6	691	748	−57
5.	(Spain) DKV Joventut	10	4	6	800	810	−10
6.	(Slovenia) Union Olimpija Ljubljana	10	2	8	725	818	−93

== Top 16 ==
The Top 16 stage was played from January 28 to March 12, 2009.

The draw was conducted on January 19 at Euroleague Basketball (company) headquarters in Barcelona. The group winners in the Regular Season were drawn from one pot, the runners-up from one pot, the teams in 3rd place from one pot and those in 4th place from one pot. Teams that played in the same group in the Regular Season could not meet again in the Top 16. Also, teams from the same country could not be drawn into the same pool unless it was necessary to prevent teams from the same Regular Season group from being drawn together.

=== Group H ===
	Team	Pld	W	L	PF	PA	Diff
1.	(Russia) CSKA Moscow	6	5	1	454	377	+77
2.	(Italy) Montepaschi Siena	6	4	2	472	456	+16
3.	(Croatia) Cibona Zagreb	6	2	4	423	456	−33
4.	(Turkey) Fenerbahçe Ülker	6	1	5	384	444	−60
