= Paşabahçe S.K. =

Paşabahçe
- Leagues: TBL
- Founded: 1950
- Folded: 1992
- History: Paşabahçe S.K. 1950–1992
- Location: Istanbul, Turkey
- Team colors: Red, Green and White
- Championships: 1 Turkish Cup
- Website: pasabahcebasket.com/
Home	Away

Paşabahçe Spor Kulübü (English: Paşabahçe Sports Club) (more commonly known as Paşabahçe) was a professional basketball club that was based in Istanbul, Turkey.

== History ==
Paşabahçe was founded in 1950 as a basketball section of the Şişecam A.Ş., an industrial group with the main activity fields of glass and chemicals production. At the end of the 1991-92 season Paşabahçe has withdrawn from the league due to financial reasons.

== Honours ==
- Turkish League
  - Runners-up (2): 1989–1990, 1991–1992
- Turkish Cup
  - Winners (1): 1992

== Notable players ==
- (Turkey) Efe Aydan (1987–1988)
- (Turkey) Kemal Dinçer
- (Turkey) Orhun Ene (1989–1992)
- (Turkey) Harun Erdenay (1990–1992)
