= Kerem Hotiç =

Turkish basketball player (born 1993)

Olin Edirne
- Position: Shooting guard

Personal information
- Born: April 25, 1993 (age 33) Istanbul, Turkey
- Listed height: 6 ft 5 in (1.96 m)
- Listed weight: 203 lb (92 kg)

Career information
- Playing career: 2009–present

Career history
- 2009–2013: Fenerbahçe
- 2011–2012: → Darüşşafaka
- 2013–present: Olin Edirne

Kerem Hotiç (born April 25, 1993) is a Turkish professional basketball player who currently plays for Olin Edirne of the Turkish Basketball League. He is 6 ft 5 in (1.96 m) tall and he weighs 187 lb (92 kg).
