= Fenerbahçe Gelişim =

Professional basketball team in Istanbul, Turkey

- Leagues: Türkiye Basketbol Ligi
- Founded: 2021; 5 years ago
- Arena: Fenerbahçe Metro Enerji Spor Salonu
- Capacity: 2,500
- Location: Istanbul, Turkey
- Team colors: Yellow, navy blue
- President: Aziz Yıldırım
- Team manager: Sercan Ergin; Sabri Gurur Erol
- Head coach: Ömer Uğurata
- Championships: (1) TB2L (2021–22)
- Website: fenerbahce.org
Home	Away

Fenerbahçe Gelişim, previously known as Fenerbahçe Koleji, is the men's youth basketball team of Fenerbahçe Tarfin of the Türkiye Basketbol Ligi. The team plays its matches at the Fenerbahçe Metro Enerji Spor Salonu with a capacity of 2,500 people.

== History ==
The team was first established in the 2021–22 season and started its activities in the Turkish Basketball Second League, the lowest tier of professional leagues. The sole purpose of the team is to provide infrastructure services to Fenerbahçe Beko.

In addition, in accordance with the sponsorship agreement with Safi Holding in the 2021–2022 season, the team started to be known as Fenerbahçe Koleji Safiport in the league. The team finished 2nd in Group B of the Turkish Basketball Second League in the 2021–2022 season and qualified directly for the Round of 16. At the end of the Round of 16 matches, the team beat its rival Saray Spor 1953 with a score of 2–1 in the series and made its name in the Final Group. Completing the Final Group undefeated, the yellow-dark blue team advanced to the semi-finals and beat its rival Kastamonu Yurdum GSK 74–60 in the semi-finals, thus enlisting its name in the Türkiye Basketbol Ligi for the next season. The team ended the season with the title of champion by beating its rival Çağdaş Bodrum Spor with a score of 75–65 in the match that will determine the champion of the 2021–2022 Turkish Basketball 2nd League on 30 April 2022.

Before the 2022–2023 season, the agreement with Safiport, the name sponsor of the team, was terminated and as a result of the name sponsorship agreement made with DS Energy before the new season, the name of the team became Fenerbahçe Koleji DS Energy. The team continues to compete in the Türkiye Basketbol Ligi since 2022–2023 season. Fenerbahçe Beko basketballers Mert Emre Ekşioğlu, Ömer Ege Ziyaettin and Yiğit Hamza Mestoğlu play for the team by duel license.

In the 2023–2024 season, name sponsorship agreement made with Novotel before the new season, the name of the team became Fenerbahçe Koleji Novotel.

In the 2025–2026 season, name sponsorship agreement made with RAMS Global before the new season, the name of the team became Fenerbahçe Koleji RAMS.

On 6 August 2026, it was announced by the club that the name of the team has been changed to Fenerbahçe Gelişim and that the roster would include players younger than 24, with a structure that would allow two-way contracts, that would make the entire roster eligible to play for the Fenerbahçe A team.

== Previous names ==
- Fenerbahçe Koleji SK (original name)
- Fenerbahçe Koleji Safiport (2021–2022)
- Fenerbahçe Koleji DS Energy (2022–2023)
- Fenerbahçe Koleji Novotel (2023–2025)
- Fenerbahçe Koleji RAMS (2025–2026)
- Fenerbahçe Gelişim (2025–2026)

== Honours ==
- Turkish Basketball Second League

Winners (1): (2021–22)

== Players ==
=== Team roster ===
Note: Flags indicate national team eligibility at FIBA-sanctioned events. Players may hold other non-FIBA nationalities not displayed.

Fenerbahçe Koleji RAMS roster
Players
Coaches

Pos.	No.	Nat.	Name	Ht.	Wt.	Age
G	0	(Turkey)	Erfa, Mehmet Ersin	1.85 m (6 ft 1 in)		20 – 2 January 2006
G	1	(Turkey)	Odabaşı, Kutay	1.90 m (6 ft 3 in)		22 – 31 January 2004
G	2	(Turkey)	Özkan, Yiğit	1.94 m (6 ft 4 in)		25 – 1 January 2001
G	3	(Turkey) (Canada)	Camgöz, Okay	1.95 m (6 ft 5 in)		24 – 5 December 2001
G	7	(Turkey)	Urunlu, Deniz Ulaş	1.97 m (6 ft 6 in)		19 – 14 July 2007
F	10	(Turkey)	Acar, Batuhan	1.97 m (6 ft 6 in)		23 – 30 October 2002
G	19	(Turkey)	İlyem, Eren	1.93 m (6 ft 4 in)		20 – 20 February 2006
C	23	(United States)	Kelly, Amari	2.06 m (6 ft 9 in)	93 kg (205 lb)	27 – 24 August 1999
G	24	(Turkey)	Gökçek, Hakan Turan	1.93 m (6 ft 4 in)		21 – 22 March 2005
C	35	(Turkey)	Hacıoğlu, Gökay	2.08 m (6 ft 10 in)		24 – 4 September 2002
C	44	(Turkey)	Tunç, Berat Berke	2.11 m (6 ft 11 in)		22 – 9 April 2004
G	77	(Turkey)	Yancı, Kadir Yiğit	1.95 m (6 ft 5 in)		20 – 30 October 2005

Head coach

- (Turkey) Ömer Uğurata

Assistant coach(es)

- (Turkey) Oğuzhan Öner

Athletic trainer(s)

- (Turkey) Erşan Keskin
- (Turkey) Emirhan Kılıç
- (Turkey) Ahmet Onur Selimbeyoğlu

Physiotherapist(s)

- (Turkey) Emirhan Kılıç
- (Turkey) Berkay Taş

Team manager

- (Turkey) Sabri Gurur Erol

Legend

- (C) Team captain
- (DC) Dual citizenship
- Injured

- Roster
Updated: 4 December 2024

=== Depth chart ===
Pos.	Starting 5	Bench 1	Bench 2	Bench 3
C	Amari Kelly	Gökay Hacıoğlu	Berat Berke Tunç
PF
SF	Batuhan Acar	Kadir Yiğit Yancı
SG	Yiğit Özkan	Kutay Odabaşı	Hakan Turan Gökçek	Deniz Ulaş Urunlu
PG		Okay Camgöz	Mehmet Ersin Erfa	Eren İlyem

=== Notable players ===
- (Turkey) Ahmet Can Duran, (2 seasons: '21-'23)
- (Turkey) Mert Emre Ekşioğlu, (4 seasons: '21-...)
- (Turkey) Yiğit Hamza Mestoğlu, (2 seasons: '23-...)
- (Turkey) Ekrem Sancaklı, (3 seasons: '21-'24)
- (Turkey) Ömer Ege Ziyaettin, (2 seasons: '23-...)
- (United States) Marreon Jackson, (1 season: '22-'23)

Italic written players still play for the club.

== Coaches ==
Period	Coach
2021–2024	(Turkey) Ertuğ Tuzcukaya
2024–...	(Turkey) Ömer Uğurata

== See also ==
- Basketbol Süper Ligi
- Fenerbahçe
- Fenerbahçe Opet
