= Ekrem Sancaklı =

Turkish basketball player (born 2001)

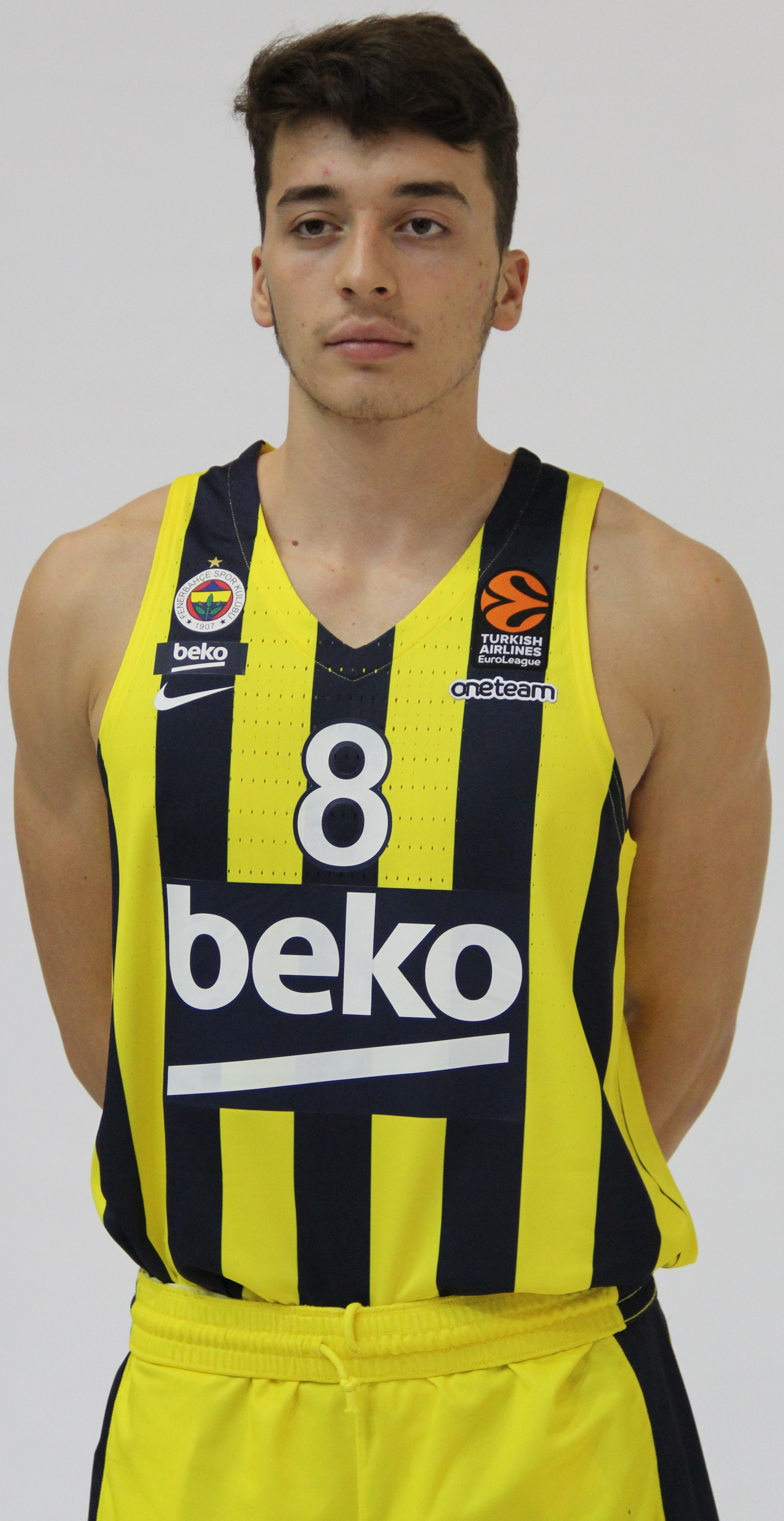

MKE Ankaragücü
- Position: Shooting guard
- League: Türkiye Basketbol Ligi

Personal information
- Born: April 26, 2001 (age 25) Turkey
- Listed height: 6 ft 7 in (2.01 m)
- Listed weight: 191 lb (87 kg)

Career information
- Playing career: 2018–present

Career history
- 2018–present: Fenerbahçe Beko
- 2020–2021: → Afyon Belediye
- 2021–2023: → Fenerbahçe Koleji
- 2024–: MKE Ankaragücü

Ekrem Sancaklı (born April 26, 2001) is a Turkish professional basketball player who plays as a shooting guard for MKE Ankaragücü of the Turkish Türkiye Basketbol Ligi (TBL).
