= Barış Güney =

Turkish basketball player (born 1983)

No. 53 – Tofaş
- Position: Point guard / shooting guard
- League: Turkish Basketball League

Personal information
- Born: December 3, 1983 (age 42) Istanbul, Turkey
- Listed height: 6 ft 5 in (1.96 m)
- Listed weight: 209 lb (95 kg)

Career information
- Playing career: 2001–present

Career history
- 2001–2006: Fenerbahçe
- 2006–2007: Beşiktaş Cola Turka
- 2007–2008: Darüşşafaka
- 2008–2009: Aliağa Petkim
- 2009–2010: Kepez Belediye
- 2010–2011: Aliağa Petkim
- 2011–2012: Mersin BB
- 2012: Antalya BB
- 2013: Türk Telekom
- 2013–2014: Olin Edirne
- 2014: Yeşilgiresun Belediye
- 2014–present: Tofaş

Career highlights
- Turkish League Assist Leader (2014)

Rebii Barış Güney (born December 3, 1983) is a Turkish professional basketball player who plays as a point guard for Tofaş of the Turkish Basketball League.
