= Murat Didin =

Turkish basketball player and Coach

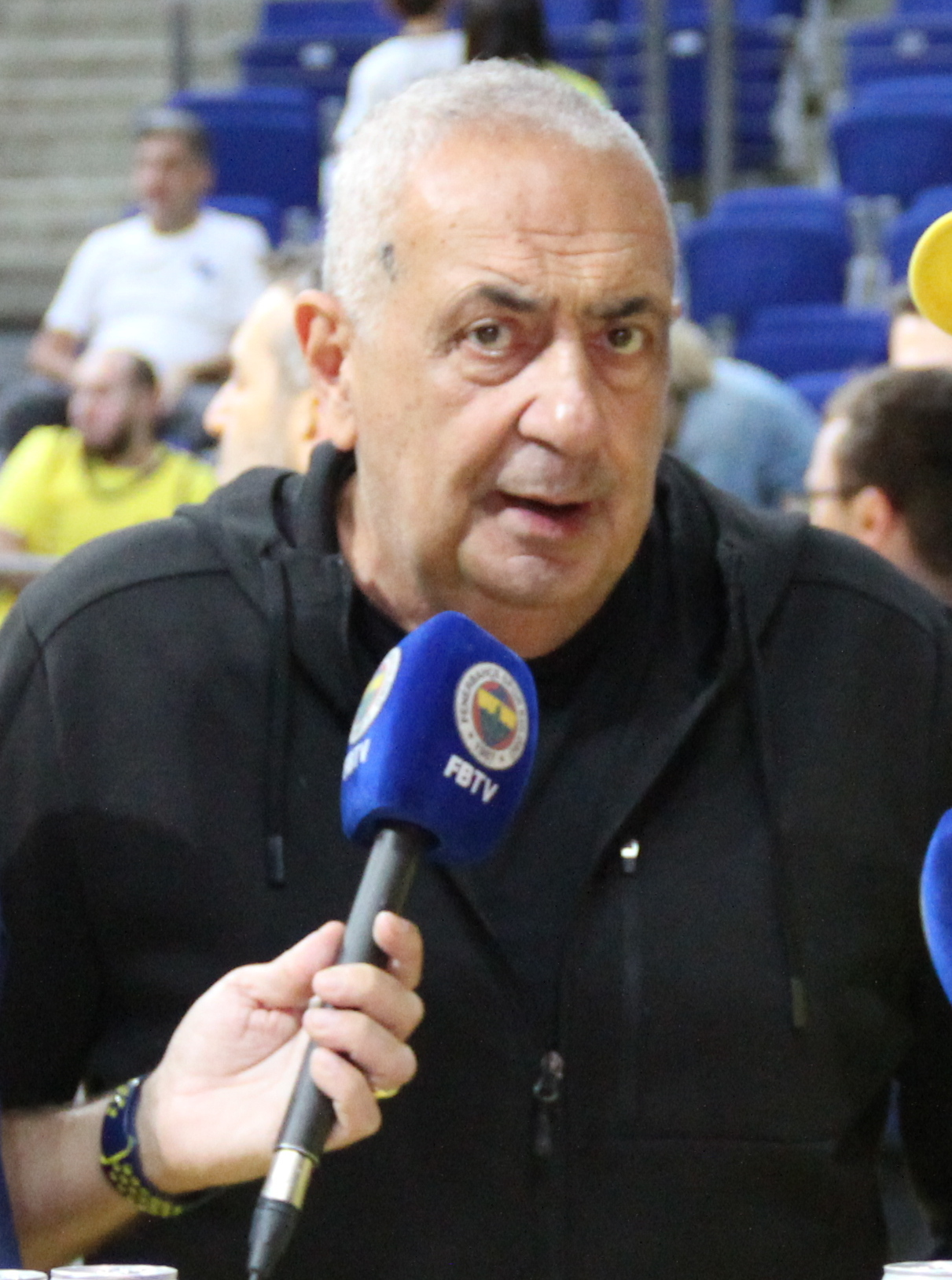

Kamil Murat Didin (born 19 March 1955) is a Turkish former basketball player and coach.

== Coaching career ==
Didin had begun his managerial career in 1982 at Ankara DSİ Sports Club. Then he coached various teams in Turkey. He achieved his very first major success at Fenerbahçe with President's Cup victory. He once coached İzmir based outfit Pınar Karşıyaka, a former champion team in 1987. During his Ülkerspor period, he reached TBL title once and President's Cup twice.

He moved to Italy in December 2002 to train Basket Rimini until 2004. Then he joined the Frankfurt team Deutsche Bank Skyliners for the 2004–05 season. Subsequently, he returned to Turkey and coached Beşiktaş Cola Turka. However, he quit the team with a mutual contract termination in January 2007 after several problems occurred, both personal and in squad.

Opel Skyliners had performed well under Didin's management in 2007–08 season, and reached the play-off semi-finals after the regular season with a 3–2 series versus Bayer Giants Leverkusen. However, the team were eliminated by Telekom Baskets Bonn at the semis.

== Teams managed ==
Didin worked both domestic and abroad. He managed Turkish teams until 2002, before joining Italian side Basket Rimini. Didin managed those teams successively:

- Ankara DSİ Spor (1982–83)
- Güney Sanayii (1983–84)
- Hortaş Yenişehir (1984–86)
- Beslen (1986–90)
- TED Kolejliler Ankara (1990–94)
- Fenerbahçe (1994–96)
- Kombassan Konya (1996–98)
- Pınar Karşıyaka (1998–99)
- Ülkerspor (1999–2002)
- Basket Rimini (2002–2004)
- Opel Skyliners (2004–05)
- Beşiktaş Cola Turka (2005–07)
- Frankfurt Skyliners (2007–10)
- Gloria Giants Düsseldorf (2010–13)
- Sintek Jonava (2018)

== Achievements ==
- (Turkey) Fenerbahçe
  - Turkish President's Cup: 1 (1994)
- (Turkey) Ülkerspor
  - Turkish Basketball League: 1 (2000–01)
  - Turkish President's Cup: 2 (2001, 2002)

== Personal ==
He studied civil engineering in Middle East Technical University at undergraduate level. He is married to Sibel Didin, former national volleyball player and have three children.
