= Mustafa Abi =

Turkish basketball player (born 1979)

Personal information
- Born: January 2, 1979 (age 47) Afyon, Turkey
- Listed height: 6 ft 6 in (1.98 m)
- Listed weight: 200 lb (91 kg)

Career information
- NBA draft: 2001: undrafted
- Playing career: 1995–2012
- Position: Shooting guard / point guard
- Number: 10, 4

Career history
- 1995-2001: Fenerbahçe
- 2001-2003: Ülkerspor
- 2003-2004: Beşiktaş
- 2004-2009: Efes Pilsen
- 2009-2010: İTÜ
- 2010-2011: Beşiktaş Cola Turka
- 2011-2012: Olin Edirne
- 2015-2019: Bocconi Team Milano

Mustafa Abi (born 2 January 1979) is a Turkish professional basketball player.
