= Yiğit Hamza Mestoğlu =

Turkish basketball player (born 2004)

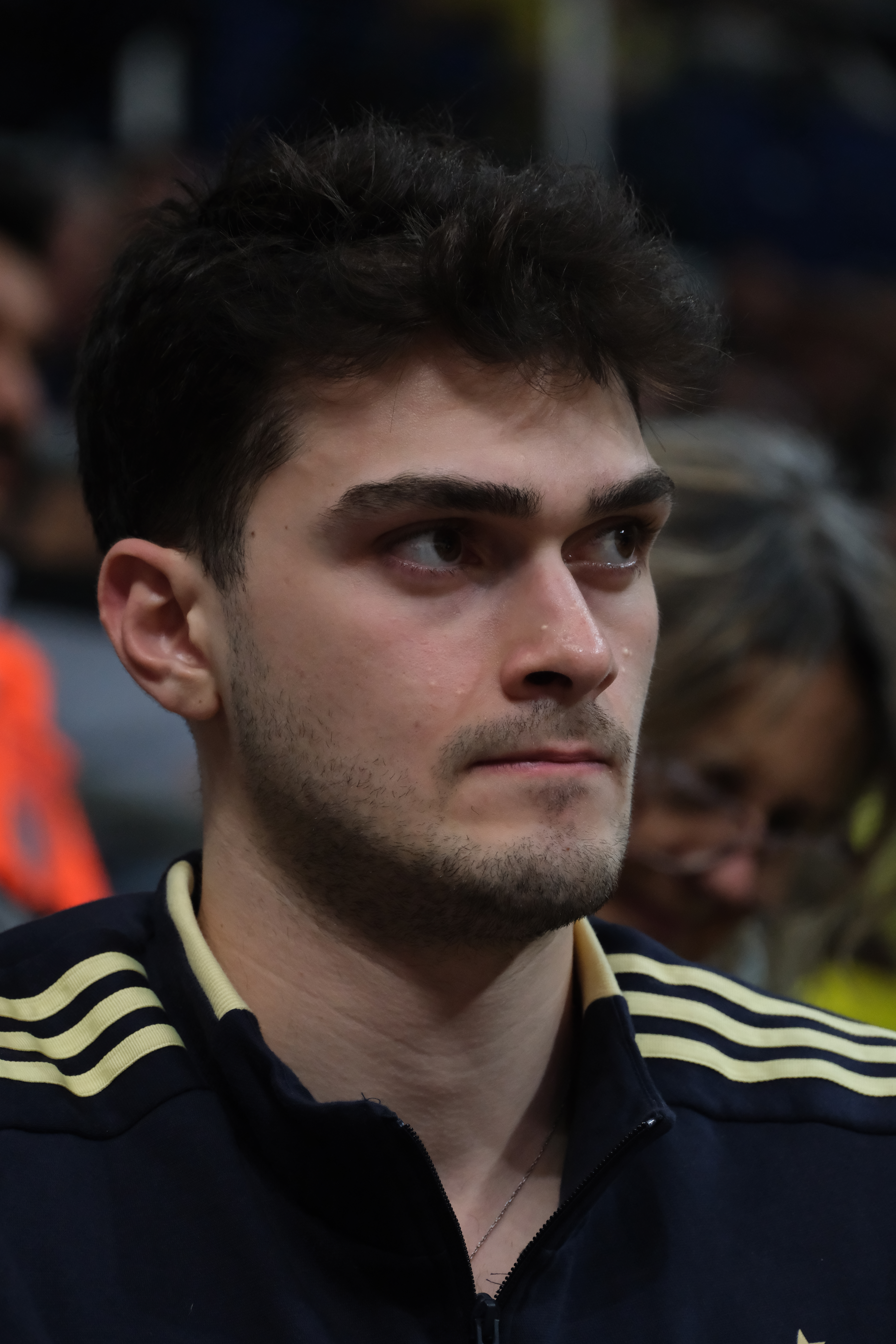

No. 22 – Trabzonspor
- Position: Small forward / power forward
- League: Basketbol Süper Ligi; FIBA Champions League

Personal information
- Born: April 22, 2004 (age 22) Istanbul, Turkey
- Listed height: 6 ft 8 in (2.03 m)
- Listed weight: 205 lb (93 kg)

Career information
- Playing career: 2019–present

Career history
- 2017–2019: Teksüt Bandırma
- 2017–2019: →Bandırma Kırmızı
- 2019–2023: UCAM Murcia
- 2022–2023: →CP La Roda
- 2023–2026: Fenerbahçe
- 2023–2024: →Fenerbahçe Koleji
- 2026–present: Trabzonspor

Career highlights
- 3× Turkish Super League champion (2024, 2025, 2026); 3× Turkish Cup winner (2024, 2025, 2026); Turkish Super Cup winner (2025)
Medals
Men's basketball
Representing Turkey
FIBA Under-19 Basketball World Cup
Bronze medal – third place	2023 Debrecen	U-19 Team
FIBA U18 European Championship
Silver medal – second place	2022 Izmir	Team

Yiğit Hamza Mestoğlu (born April 22, 2004) is a Turkish professional basketball player for Trabzonspor of the Turkish Basketbol Süper Ligi (BSL) and the FIBA Champions League. Standing at 6 ft 8 in (2.03 m), he plays at the small forward and power forward positions.

== Professional career ==
=== Early years with Bandırma ===
Mestoğlu started playing basketball with Teksüt Bandırma's youth team Bandırma Kırmızı.

=== UCAM Murcia (2019–2022) ===
He transferred to UCAM Murcia with youth level for 2019–20 season. He played with the club's youth and senior level for three years.

In the 2020–21 season he would alternate his participation in the junior team with the EBA League affiliate, averaging 8 points and 7.2 rebounds per game in his team's permanence phase. With the junior team, he played in the Spanish Club Championship in which he averaged 15.8 points, 7.2 rebounds and a PIR of 19.2.

On 10 August 2021, Mestoğlu was renewed by UCAM Murcia until 2026. During the 2021–22 season, he was part of UCAM Murcia B of the EBA League. On December 27, 2021, he made his debut in the Liga ACB in a match that would end with a 83–100 victory against CB Gran Canaria, in which Mestoğlu would play 42 seconds in which he would provide an assist. He played two match to play for the team in professional level.

==== CP La Roda (2022–2023, loan) ====
He was loaned to CP La Roda of LEB Plata for 2022–23 season. He played with 8.4 pts, 3.6 rebs and 1.0 assist average with the team of 25 season game.

=== Fenerbahçe (2023–2026) ===
He transferred to EuroLeague powerhouse Fenerbahçe Beko for the 2023–24 season. He also played for Fenerbahçe Beko youth team Fenerbahçe Koleji Novotel.

On 19 January 2024, he made his EuroLeague debut against Žalgiris in an away match (lost 98–75).

On 26 January 2024, he suffered an injury during Fenerbahçe Beko's team training for the Virtus Bologna match in EuroLeague. After the checks, a right knee anterior cruciate ligament tear was detected and surgery was performed on 1 February 2024.

After an eight months rehabilitation period, he was back to court with Fenerbahçe Koleji Novotel and scored nine points against Harem Spor (lost 88–66) on 1 December 2024 and scored 17 points against Çağdaş Bodrumspor (won 119–112) on 4 December 2024.

=== Trabzonspor (2026–present) ===
On July 1, 2026, Mestoğlu signed with Trabzonspor of the Basketbol Süper Ligi (BSL).

== Career statistics ==
Legend
GP	Games played	GS	Games started	MPG	Minutes per game
FG%	Field-goal percentage	3P%	3-point field-goal percentage	FT%	Free-throw percentage
RPG	Rebounds per game	APG	Assists per game	SPG	Steals per game
BPG	Blocks per game	PPG	Points per game	PIR	Performance index rating
**Bold**	Career high

=== EuroLeague ===
Year	Team	GP	GS	MPG	FG%	3P%	FT%	RPG	APG	SPG	BPG	PPG	PIR
2023–24	Fenerbahçe	1	0	2.0	—	—	—	—	—	—	—	0.0	0.0
Career		1	0	2.0	—	—	—	—	—	—	—	0.0	0.0

=== Domestic leagues ===
†	Denotes seasons in which Mestoğlu won the domestic league

Year	Team	League	GP	MPG	FG%	3P%	FT%	RPG	APG	SPG	BPG	PPG
2021–22	(Spain) UCAM Murcia	ACB	2	2.0	.000	.000	—	—	.5	—	—	0.0
2022–23	(Spain) La Roda	LEB Plata	26	20.1	.536	.452	.698	3.8	1.1	.6	.1	8.7
2023–24	(Turkey) Fenerbahçe Koleji Novotel	TBL	13	27.1	.412	.237	.804	4.5	2.4	.8	.1	10.6
2023–24†	(Turkey) Fenerbahçe	TBSL	7	8.7	.385	.429	.500	1.7	.6	—	—	2.3
