= Zaza Enden =

Turkish basketball player and wrestler (born 1976)

Personal information
- Born: 28 May 1976 (age 50) Tbilisi, Georgia
- Listed height: 6 ft 9 in (2.06 m)
- Listed weight: 255 lb (116 kg)

Career information
- NBA draft: 1998: undrafted
- Playing career: 1993–2009
- Position: Power forward
- Number: 8

Career history
- 1993-1995: Darüşşafaka
- 1995-2003: Fenerbahçe
- 2003: ESPE Basket Châlons-en-Champagne
- 2003–2004: Tekelspor
- 2004-2005: Mersin BB
- 2006–2008: Akçakoca Poyraz Gençlik
- 2008–2009: Eyüpspor

Zaza Enden (born Zaza Eladze on 28 May 1976 in Tbilisi, Georgian Soviet Socialist Republic, Soviet Union (present Georgia) is a professional wrestler and a Turkish professional basketball player of Georgian descent. He is 2.06 m tall and weighs 116 kg. His well-known nickname is "Tatu". Zaza Enden plays at the power forward position. He came to Turkey in 1992, firstly to Trabzon, afterwards he had his Turkish citizenship.

Zaza Enden spent his best years with Fenerbahçe, playing at Euroleague level and he was the team captain between 1998 and 2003.

As the player-coach for Akçakoca Poyraz Gençlik in Düzce Enden helped his team win promotion to the Second Basketball League at the end of the season 2006–07.

In 2010, Enden joined the professional wrestling promotion Turkish Power Wrestling.
