= Güray Kanan =

Turkish basketball player (born 1971)

Personal information
- Born: 1 April 1971 (age 55) Adana, Turkey
- Listed height: 1.98 m (6 ft 6 in)

Career information
- Playing career: 1989–2007
- Position: Power forward / small forward
- Number: 11

Career history
- 1989–1998: Fenerbahçe
- 1998–1999: Emlakbank Ortaköy
- 1999–2000: Darüşşafaka
- 2000–2001: Troy Pilsner
- 2001–2002: Oyak Renault
- 2002–2003: Tofaş
- 2003–2004: TED Ankara Kolejliler
- 2004–2005: İTÜ
- 2005–2006: Sümerbank Beykozspor
- 2006–2007: Antalya BB

Güray Kanan (born 1 April 1971) is a former Turkish professional basketball player. He played for Turkey national basketball team and member of Fenerbahçe's first Turkish Basketball League championship squad.

He was married with Pinar Yapicilar in Instabul, Turkey. They have one daughter, Deniz Kanan, who currently studies art in the United Kingdom. She was born in Ankara and was a competitive equestrian show jumper. The family currently lives in Antalya and has many business ventures. They own two restaurants, The Big Man, in Antalya.
