= Hüsnü Çakırgil =

Turkish basketball player (born 1965)

Personal information
- Born: October 3, 1965 (age 60) Adana, Turkey
- Listed height: 6 ft 6 in (1.98 m)
- Listed weight: 210 lb (95 kg)

Career information
- NBA draft: 1987: undrafted
- Playing career: 1985–1997
- Position: Small forward
- Number: 15

Career history
- 1985–1986: Hortaş Yenişehir
- 1986–1989: Beslenspor
- 1989–1990: Nasaş
- 1990–1995: Fenerbahçe
- 1995–1997: Beşiktaş

Career highlights
- FIBA Balkans Selection (1991 I); Turkish Super League champion (1991); 3× Turkish Supercup winner (1990, 1991, 1994); Turkish Super League Top Scorer (1989)
- Stats at Basketball Reference

Hüsnü Çakırgil (born 3 October 1965 in Turkey) is a former Turkish professional basketball player. He was well known for his great 3 point shooting ability. At a height of 1.98 m (6 ft 6 in) tall, he played at the small forward position.

== Professional career ==
Çakırgil was the Top Scorer of the Turkish Super League, in 1989.

== National team career ==
Çakırgil was a member of the senior Turkish national basketball team. With Turkey, he played at the 1993 EuroBasket.
