= Cenk Renda =

Turkish basketball player and coach

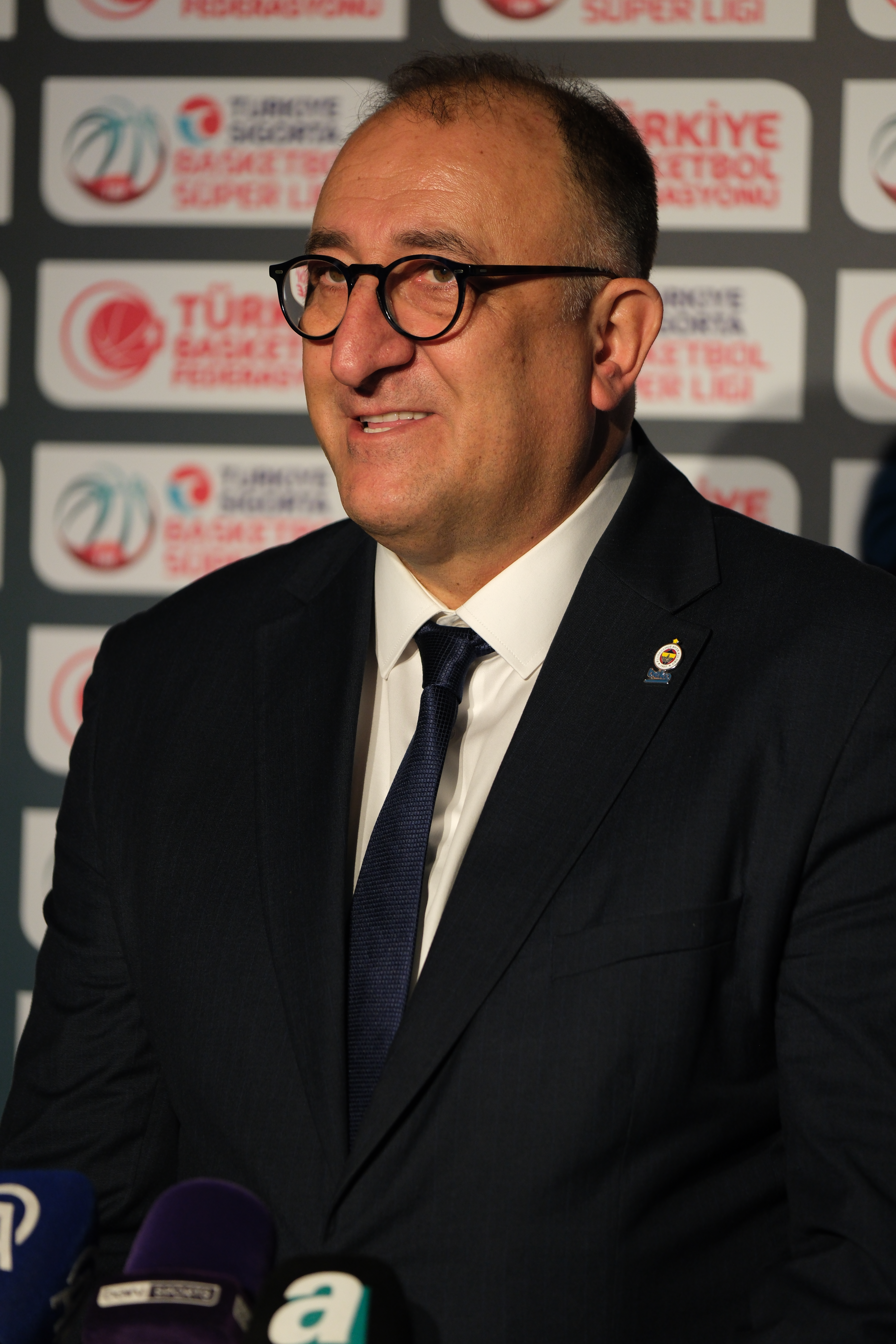

Cenk Renda (born 10 October 1969, in Turkey) is a former Turkish professional basketball player. He played for Turkey national basketball team while also playing for Anadolu Efes, Fenerbahçe and Oyak Renault during his career.

The former power forward is 2.05 m tall. Currently, he is team manager of Fenerbahçe.

== Career ==
- Efes Pilsen
- Fenerbahçe
- Oyak Renault (basketball)
