= Gökbörü Aygar =

Turkish basketball player (born 1977)

Gökbörü Aygar (also known as George 'Smooth Sammie' Aygar in USA, born January 11, 1977) is a Turkish basketball player. He is 2,10 m (6 ft 11 in), 91 kg (200 lbs) and playing center position. His brother Mehmet played professional basketball in Turkey, as well as his other brother Alisin. He also recruited by DePaul University. He majoring in Computer Science Class of 2003 in Northeastern University.

He played three years of basketball at Büyük Kolej in Turkey. He was a member of the Turkish Junior National Team. He played professional basketball for Fenerbahçe Istanbul between 1994–96 and loaned for Oyak Renault in 1996-97.

He is now a world class web programmer at a software development firm. His programming alias is "Smooth Sammie".

== Bunker Hill College ==
He spent 1997-98 and 1998-99 seasons at Bunker Hill Community College under head coach Christopher Jones. In two seasons, the team went 49-11 and captured a pair of National Small College New England Championships. He named Team MVP and first team National Small College All-American in 1997-98 after averaging 23.3 points, 11.0 rebounds and 8.2 blocks per game. He selected NSCAA All-American honorable mention in 1998-99 season with averaged 18.9 points, 13.6 rebounds and 6.9 blocks. He scored over 1,000 points and grabbed more than 700 rebounds in career at Bunker Hill.

== Northeastern University ==
=== 1999-00 season ===
He played in 27 games and starting nine became the first Northeastern newcomer since Rah-Shun Roberts to reach double-figures in scoring in first ever four games. He had 10 points and five boards in collegiate debut against St. Bonaventure on November 10. He averaged 9,4 points (50.9% 1pts, 50.9% 2pts), 3 rebounds, 1 assists, 1,1 blocks, 0,6 steals and 1,9 turnovers in 20,7 mins.

- He scored 14 points at Duquesne, November 23.
- He had three blocks at UNC Greensboro, November 27.
- He had 13 points, 7 rebounds and 3 blocks against Navy, December 2.
- He had 10 points and two steals against St. Peter, December 8.
- He had 11 of his 15 points in the second half on 4/5 shooting and with 4 rebounds, 4 assists and 2 blocks at Drexel, January 2.
- He had 8 points and 5 boards at Hartford, January 23.
- He had 11 points, 4 rebounds, 3 assists and 2 blocks against Brown, January 25.
- He had 12 points on 5/8 shooting to go with 4 rebounds, 2 assists and 2 blocks against Drexel, January 3.
- He had 13 points on 5/8 from the field to go with a pair of assists at Maine, February 13.
- He had 8 points at Towson, February 10.
- He pulled down season-high 9 rebounds at Delaware, February 12.
- He had 7 points and 5 rebounds against Brown, February 15.
- He grabbed 8 rebounds, 3 blocks and 4 steals against Hartford, February 17.
- He tied season-high 15 points, on 7/11 shooting, to go with 6 rebounds against Maine, February 24.
- He hit a jumper in final minute of regulation to tie the game at 57 and send it into overtime.
