= Ali Limoncuoğlu =

Turkish basketball player (born 1959)

Ali Rıza Limoncuoğlu (born 3 March 1959) is a former Turkish basketball player. He is known by the nickname Aliço.

Standing at 1.78 metres tall, Limoncuoğlu played as a point guard and began his basketball career in Ankara. Ali Rıza Limoncuoğlu started playing basketball at DSİ in Ankara and began his professional career at the newly established Ziraat Fakültesi He played for four seasons at Ankara University Ziraat Fakültesi and one season at Ankara's İstanbul Bankası Yenişehir team. In 1982, he transferred to Fenerbahçe, which had assembled a formidable squad by signing Efe Aydan and Calvin Roberts and competed in the yellow and navy blue jersey until he retired from basketball in 1993. He rose to the national team. He stood out for his success in three-point shots and his superior ball-handling skills.

During his time at Fenerbahçe, he contributed as team captain to the club's first-ever Turkish Basketball League championship in the 1990–91 season. Wearing this jersey, he won the regular season championship in 1982-83, 1984-85, 1987-88, 1989-90, 1990-91 and 1991-92, the 1990 and 1991 Presidential Cup championships, the 1985 and 1988 Presidential Cup finalist titles, the 1988 and 1992 Youth and Sports Directorate Cup championships, and numerous special tournament titles. He concluded his active basketball career as captain in 1992.

Following point guard Orhun Ene's injury during the 1992–93 season, Limoncuoğlu wore the yellow-and-navy jersey for one more season before retiring from basketball in 1993 to pursue an active career in business.

== See also ==
- Fenerbahçe S.K. (basketball)
