= Çukurova Sanayi =

- Leagues: Basketball Super League
- Founded: 1978
- Folded: 1992
- Arena: Mersin Edip Buran Kapalı Spor Salonu
- Location: Tarsus, Mersin, Turkey
- Team colors: Green and White
- Championships: 1 Turkish Basketball Presidential Cup

Çukurova Sanayi (English: Çukurova Industry) was a professional basketball club that was based in Tarsus, Mersin, Turkey.

== History ==
Çukurova Sanayi was founded in 1978 as Tarsus Schweppes Gençlik ve Spor Kulübü. At the end of the 1991–92 season Çukurova Sanayi has withdrawn from the league due to financial reasons.

During playing in Basketball Super League, Çukurova Sanayi lost the final matches they played with Eczacıbaşı for two seasons. Çukurova Sanayi won Turkish Basketball Presidential Cup by defeating Eczacıbaşı, whom they had been defeated twice in the Basketball Super League finals, in 1989 Turkish Basketball Presidential Cup final.

== Honours ==
- Basketball Super League
  - Runners-up (2): 1987–1988, 1988–1989
- Turkish Basketball Presidential Cup
  - Winners (1): 1989

== Notable players ==
- (Turkey) Serdar Apaydın (1986–1990)
- (Turkey) Kemal Dinçer (1988–1990)
- (Turkey) Murat Evliyaoğlu (1990–1992)
- (Turkey) Ömer Büyükaycan (1990–1992)
- (Turkey) Erman Kunter (1991–1992)
- (United States) Ricky Frazier (1984–1985)
- (United States) Larry Spriggs (1987–1988)
- (United States) Darryl Middleton (1988–1989)
- (United States) Eugene McDowell (1989–1990)
- (United States) Richard Coffey (1991–1992)
