= Ertuğrul Erdoğan =

Turkish basketball coach (born 1968)

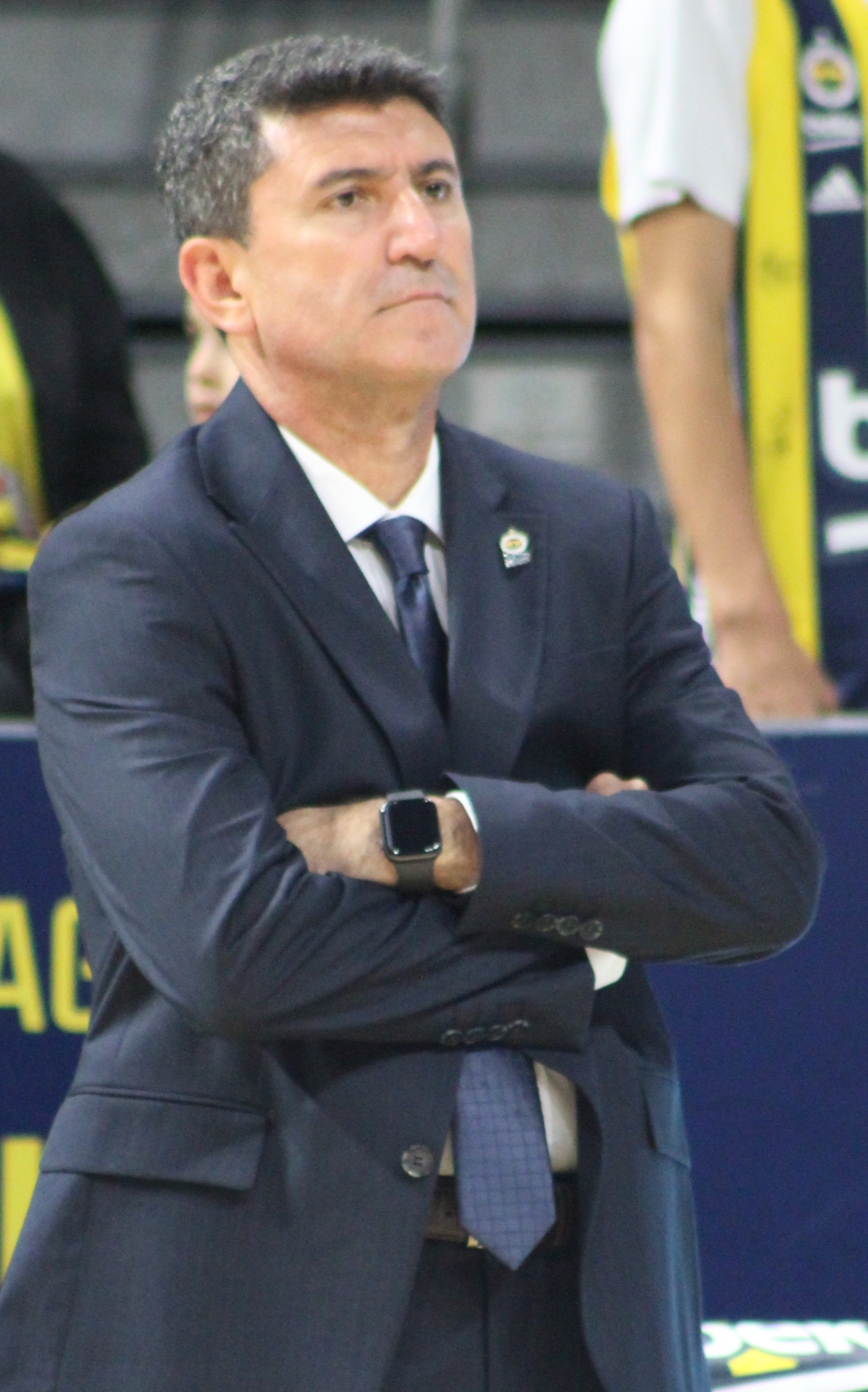

Fenerbahçe Tarfin
- Position: Assistant coach
- League: BSL; EuroLeague

Personal information
- Born: October 18, 1968 (age 58) Ankara, Turkey
- Coaching career: 1988–present

Career history

Coaching
- 1990–1996: PTT (assistant)
- 1996–1998: Galatasaray (assistant)
- 1998–1999: Iowa State (consultant)
- 1999–2000: Oyak Renault (assistant)
- 2000–2013: Fenerbahçe (assistant)
- 2009–2010: Fenerbahçe (interim HC)
- 2010–2013: Turkey (assistant)
- 2012: Turkey U20
- 2013: Fenerbahçe
- 2013–2014: Türk Telekom
- 2015–2018: İstanbul BB
- 2017: Turkey (assistant)
- 2018–2021: Galatasaray
- 2022–2023: Śląsk Wrocław
- 2023–2024: Runa Basket Moscow
- 2024–present: Fenerbahçe (assistant)

Career highlights
- As interim head coach: Turkish Super League champion (2010); As assistant coach: EuroLeague champion (2025); 4× Turkish Super League champion (2007, 2008, 2025, 2026); 3× Turkish Cup winner (2010, 2013, 2025); 2× Turkish President Cup winner (2008, 2025)
Medals
Men's basketball
Assistant Coach for Turkey
FIBA World Cup
Silver medal – second place	2010 Turkey

Ertuğrul Erdoğan (born October 18, 1968) is a Turkish professional basketball coach who is the coach of Fenerbahçe of Turkish Super League.

== Coaching career ==
=== First years ===
In 1996, Erdogan began his professional level coaching career with Galatasaray.

Erdoğan later served as an assistant coach for the Fenerbahçe from 2000 to 2013. With Fenerbahçe, Erdoğan worked under legendary coaches Aydın Örs and Bogdan Tanjevic.

During the 2009–2010 season, coach Tanjevic was diagnosed with colorectal cancer and left the team at late March, Erdogan took over and led Fenerbahçe to the 2009–10 Turkish Basketball League championship. Despite his success against the title favourites Efes Pilsen, he was not appointed as Fenerbahçe's head coach in the following season. Erdogan continued to serve in an assistant coach capacity with head coaches Neven Spahija and Simone Pianigiani in the following seasons. He left Fenerbahce in 2013, after 13 years.

=== Žalgiris Kaunas' interest ===
Shortly after Sarunas Jasikevicius' decision to joining Barcelona in the summer of 2020, Ertugrul Erdogan has emerged the frontrunner for Zalgiris head coach position. Erdogan spoke with Zalgiris president and GM Paulius Motiejunas but there was never traction on reaching a contract agreement as the days wore on. Zalgiris opted to sign with the Salt Lake City Stars head coach, Martin Schiller.

A couple of days after Zalgiris' interest, on July 14, 2020, Galatasaray officially signed head coach Ertugrul Erdogan to a 1+1 contract extension, the team announced.

=== Galatasaray (2018–2020) ===
On July 26, 2018, Erdogan signed a two-year contract, and agreed to become the new head coach of the Turkish club Galatasaray.

During his tenure at Galatasaray, Erdogan scouted and helped to promote many players into the EuroLeague level. Rookies like Nigel Hayes, Aaron Harrison and Alex Poythress played under his leadership in their first seasons in Europe and then they signed with the EuroLeague clubs Zalgiris, Olympiacos B.C and Zenit St. Petersburg respectively.

Zach Auguste, who was the starting center of Erdogan's Galatasaray for both seasons, agreed with EuroLeague club Panathinaikos on July 20, 2020. Greg Whittington, another Galatasaray alum, "will sign with an NBA team, unless a major Euroleague team makes a strong offer" according to Whittington's agent Jerry Dianis.

Galatasaray announced that the club has entered negotiations with head coach Ertugrul Erdogan for the mutual termination of his contract. On November 10, 2020, coach Erdogan bid his farewell to Galatasaray and their fans. "Without honesty, there is neither trust nor sustainable success. Thank you to everyone, mainly our fans, who supported me and my staff during my two and a half years at Galatasaray. My conscience is clear" he later tweeted.

=== Śląsk Wrocław (2023) ===
On February 27, 2023, he signed a one-and-a-half-year contract with Polish champions Śląsk Wrocław, who also competes in EuroCup.

On June 21, 2023, Turkish coach decided to use the clause in his contract to leave Śląsk Wrocław after five months. Under his leadership, Wroclaw team finished the regular season in the first place, and then reached the finals in the Polish League Playoffs. Slask finished the season as the runners-up, they lost final series against Wilki Morskie Szczecin with the score of 4–2.

=== Runa Basket Moscow (2023–2024) ===
On June 28, 2023, he signed a 2-year contract with the VTB United League newcomers Runa Basket Moscow.

== Personal life ==
Erdogan graduated from Middle East Technical University Department of Physical Education and Sports.
