= Mert Emre Ekşioğlu =

Turkish basketball player (born 2002)

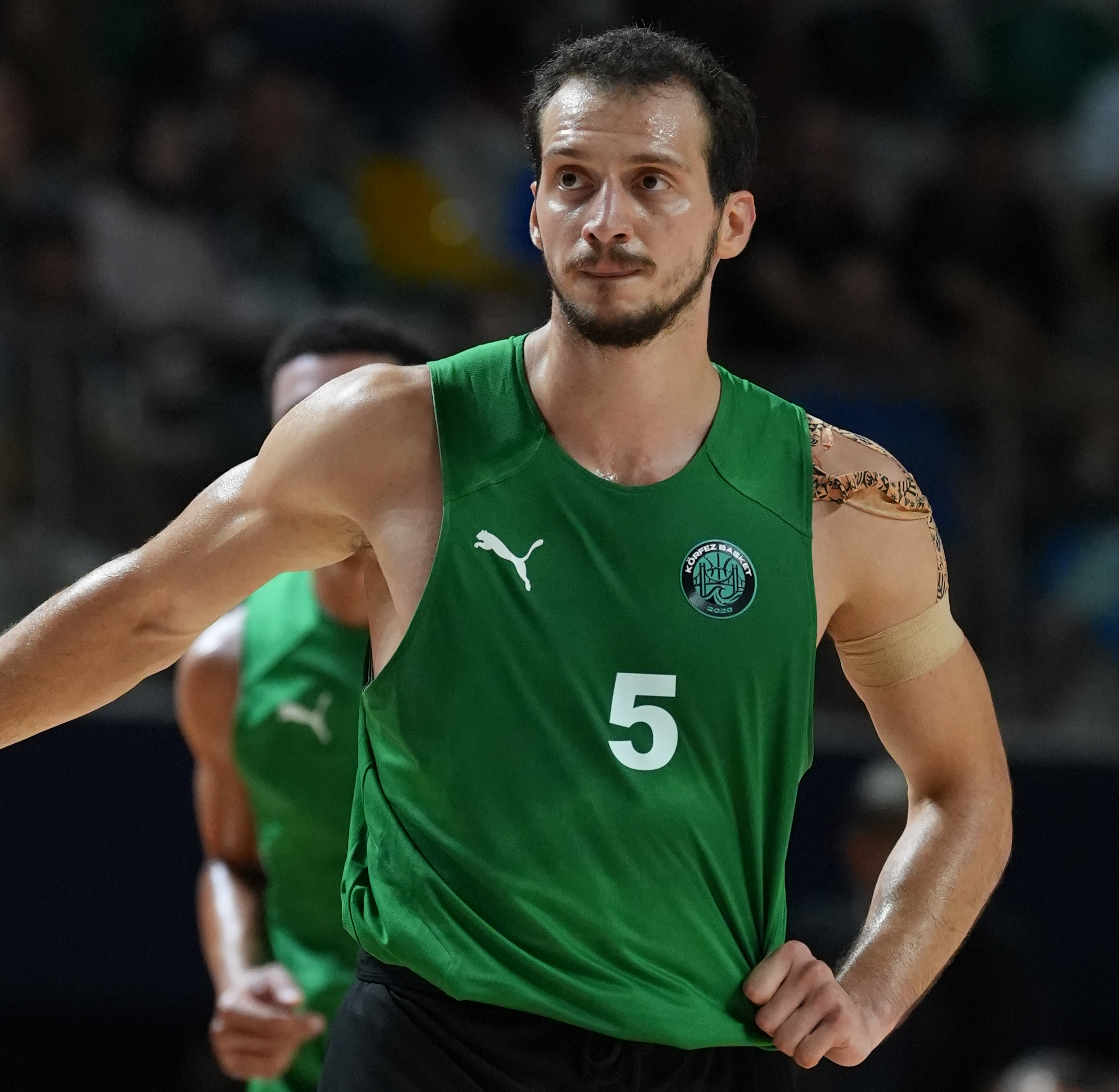

No. 5 – Biotekno Körfez Basket
- Position: Point guard
- League: BSL

Personal information
- Born: January 2, 2002 (age 24) Istanbul, Turkey
- Listed height: 6 ft 2 in (1.88 m)
- Listed weight: 187 lb (85 kg)

Career information
- Playing career: 2021–present

Career history
- 2021–2026: Fenerbahçe
- 2021–2026: →Fenerbahçe Koleji
- 2026–present: Körfez Basket

Career highlights
- EuroLeague champion (2025); 3x Turkish Super League champion (2024, 2025, 2026); 3x Turkish Cup winner (2024, 2025, 2026); Turkish Super Cup winner (2025)

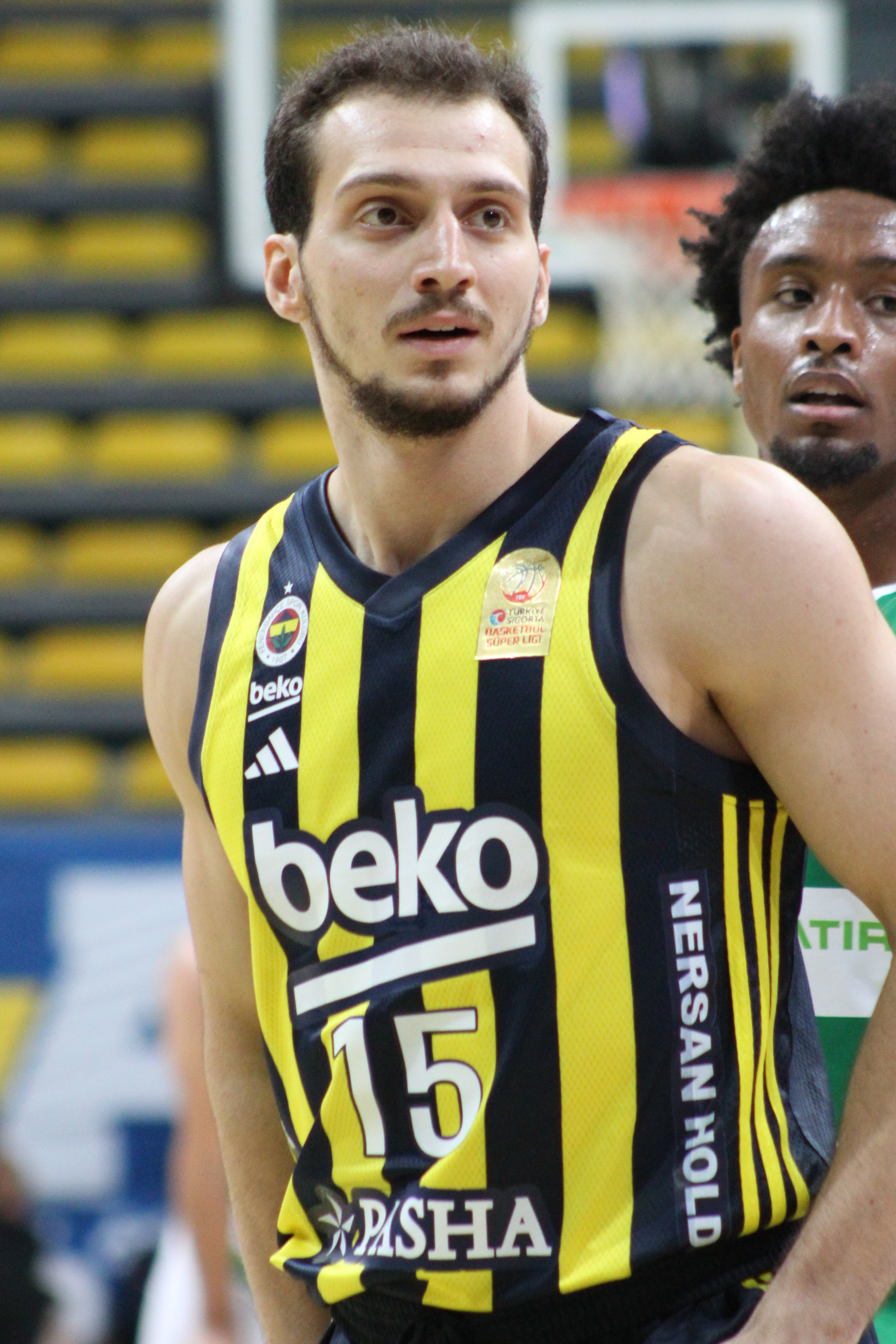

Mert Emre Ekşioğlu (born January 2, 2002) is a Turkish professional basketball player for Körfez Basket of the Basketbol Süper Ligi (BSL). Standing at 6 ft 2 in (1.88 m), he plays at the point guard position.

== Professional career ==
On October 1, 2023, he made his Turkish Super League debut with the team against Çağdaş Bodrumspor and started his basketball history. Same day, he also played against Pizza Lazza Harem with Fenerbahçe Koleji Novotel.

On 3 December 2024, he made his EuroLeague debut against Baskonia in a 88–76 away lost. He also played against Monaco Basket and Barcelona in 2024–25 EuroLeague season.

On August 7, 2026, he signed with Körfez Basket of the Basketbol Süper Ligi (BSL).

== Personal life ==
He is a student of civil engineering at Maltepe University.

== Honors ==
(Turkey) Fenerbahçe

- Triple Crown: (2024–25)
- EuroLeague: (2025)
- Turkish Super League: (2024, 2025)
- Turkish Cup: (2024, 2025)
- Turkish Super Cup: (2025)

== Career statistics ==
Legend
GP	Games played	GS	Games started	MPG	Minutes per game
FG%	Field-goal percentage	3P%	3-point field-goal percentage	FT%	Free-throw percentage
RPG	Rebounds per game	APG	Assists per game	SPG	Steals per game
BPG	Blocks per game	PPG	Points per game	PIR	Performance index rating
**Bold**	Career high

=== EuroLeague ===
†	Denotes seasons in which Hall won the EuroLeague

Year	Team	GP	GS	MPG	FG%	3P%	FT%	RPG	APG	SPG	BPG	PPG	PIR
2024–25 †	Fenerbahçe Beko	3	0	9.4	—	—	—	—	—	—	.—	—	.0
Career		3	0	3.1	—	—	—	—	—	—	.—	—	.0

=== Domestic leagues ===
†	Denotes seasons in which Ziyaettin won the domestic league

Year	Team	League	GP	MPG	FG%	3P%	FT%	RPG	APG	SPG	BPG	PPG
2023–24 †	(Turkey) Fenerbahçe	BSL	29	8.5	.588	.448	.500	.8	.2	.2	—	2.2
2024–25 †	(Turkey) Fenerbahçe	TBSL	31	8.1	.357	.300	.727	.8	.1	.1	—	1.5
