= Larry Richard =

American basketball player

Personal information
- Born: April 23, 1965 (age 60) California, U.S.
- Listed height: 6 ft 7 in (2.01 m)
- Listed weight: 200 lb (91 kg)

Career information
- College: Texas Christian (1985–1987)
- NBA draft: 1987: undrafted
- Playing career: 1987–1995
- Position: Center / power forward
- Number: 15, 12

Career history
- 1987-1989: Eczacıbaşı
- 1989-1992: Fenerbahçe
- 1992-1995: Efes Pilsen

Larry Richard (born 23 April 1965) is a former professional basketball player from United States who played for Eczacıbaşı B.K., 2 years with Fenerbahçe and 3 years with Efes Pilsen SK. He played as center and 2.02 m.

== Honors ==
- Turkish League
  - 1988, 1989 with Eczacıbaşı
  - 1991 with Fenerbahçe
  - 1993, 1994 with Efes Pilsen S.K.
- Turkish Cup
  - 1994 with Efes Pilsen S.K.
- President's Cup
  - 1988 with Eczacıbaşı
  - 1990, 1991 with Fenerbahçe
  - 1992, 1993 with Efes Pilsen S.K.
- European Cup runner-up
  - 1993 with Efes Pilsen S.K.
