= Kemal Dinçer =

Turkish basketball player (born 1963)

Personal information
- Born: 2 September 1963 (age 63)

Career history

Playing
- 1982-1986: Fenerbahçe
- 1988-1990: Çukurova Sanayi
- 1990-1993: Fenerbahçe

Coaching
- 2002-2003: Fenerbahçe SK's football team

Kemal Dinçer (born 2 September 1963) is a former Turkish professional basketball player. He played for the Turkey national basketball team. He was also a member of Fenerbahçe's first Turkish Basketball League championship squad.

Dinçer was Fenerbahçe SK's football team manager in the 2002–03 season.

== Career ==
- 1982-86 Fenerbahçe
- 1988-90 Çukurova Sanayi
- 1990-93 Fenerbahçe
