= Murat Evliyaoğlu =

Turkish basketball player (born 1969)

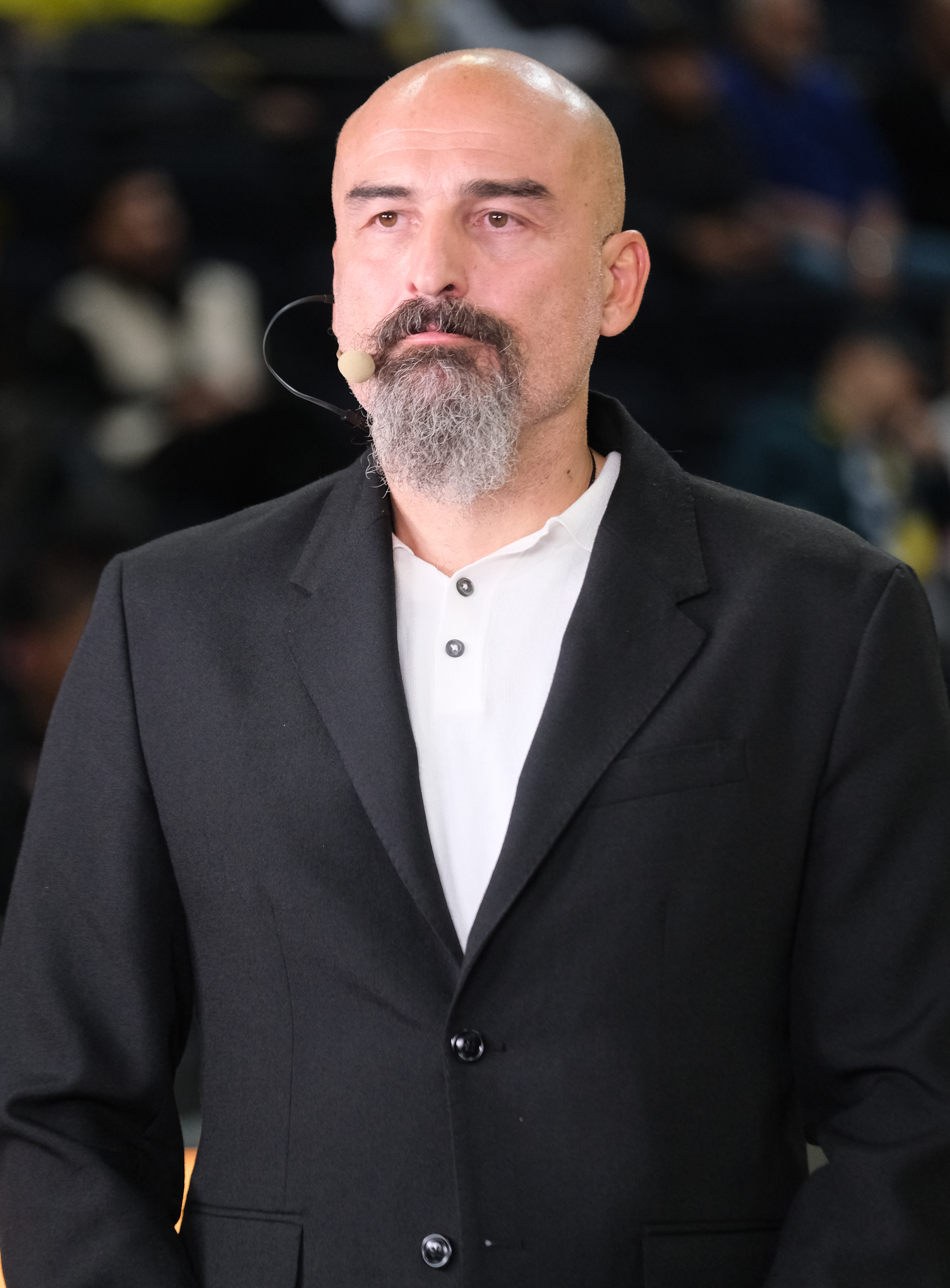

Murat Evliyaoğlu (born 2 June 1969 in Turkey) is a retired Turkish professional basketball player. He played as guard position and helped lot of times to Turkey national basketball team.

The former guard is 1.94 m.

== Career ==
- 1990-92 Çukurova Sanayi
- 1992–94 Kolej Ankara
- 1994–95 PTT Ankara
- 1995–99 Efes Pilsen SK
- 1999–00 Turk Telekom
- 2000–01 Fenerbahçe
- 2001–02 Turk Telekom
- 2002–03 Göztepe İzmir
