= Levent Topsakal =

Turkish basketball player and manager

Personal information
- Born: June 9, 1966 (age 60) Istanbul, Turkey
- Listed height: 6 ft 2.75 in (1.90 m)
- Listed weight: 180 lb (82 kg)

Career information
- NBA draft: 1988: undrafted
- Playing career: 1983–2002
- Position: Point guard / shooting guard
- Number: 11, 15

Career history
- 1983–1988: İTÜ
- 1988–1990: Efes Pilsen
- 1990–1992: Fenerbahçe
- 1992–1993: Nasaş
- 1993–1994: Fenerbahçe
- 1994–1996: Galatasaray
- 1996–1997: Tofaş
- 1997–1998: Fenerbahçe
- 1998–1999: Beşiktaş
- 1999–2000: Ülker
- 2000–2003: İTÜ
- 2004–2005: Marmaris Belediye

Mete Levent Topsakal (born 9 June 1966) is a former professional basketball player from Turkey and currently assistant manager of Turkey national basketball team. He played as a point and shooting guard at height 1,90 m.
