= Rasim Başak =

Azerbaijani-Turkish basketball player

Personal information
- Born: February 17, 1980 (age 46) Baku, Azerbaijan SSR, Soviet Union
- Listed height: 6 ft 7.5 in (2.02 m)
- Listed weight: 220 lb (100 kg)

Career information
- NBA draft: 2002: undrafted
- Playing career: 1999–2019
- Position: Power forward / small forward
- Number: 8

Career history
- 1999-2003: Oyak Renault
- 2003-2010: Fenerbahçe
- 2010-2011: Türk Telekom B.K.
- 2011-2012: Antalya B.B.
- 2012-2013: Trabzonspor
- 2015-2019: Aztop Baku

Rasim Başak (born on 17 February 1980) is a retired professional basketball player of Azerbaijani-Turkish descent. As a power forward, he stands at 2.02 m tall and weighs 100 kg. Throughout his career, he wore the jersey number 8. Born to a Russian mother and an Azeri father, Başak holds Turkish citizenship and has represented the Turkish national team on multiple occasions. Following TBF's permit, he is set to play for the Azerbaijan national basketball team.

== Career highlights ==
- 1998 Turkish Youth Championship with Oyak Renault
- Second place of Turkish 2nd Basketball League with Oyak Renault
- 2004–05 FIBA Europe League Final Four with Fenerbahçe
- 2007, 2008, 2010 Turkish Basketball League Champions with Fenerbahçe
- 2007 Turkish President's Cup Champion with Fenerbahçe
- 2013 Turkish 2nd Basketball League Champion with Trabzonspor
- 2016 Azerbaijan Basketball League Champion with Aztop Baku

== International career ==
He played for Turkish national team in EuroBasket 2003 and started to play for Azerbaijan national team since July 2010.
