= Zeki Gülay =

Turkish basketball player (born 1972)

Personal information
- Born: 15 August 1972 (age 53) Istanbul, Turkey
- Listed height: 6 ft 9 in (2.06 m)
- Listed weight: 285 lb (129 kg)

Career information
- NBA draft: 1994: undrafted
- Playing career: 1991–2009
- Position: Center
- Number: 14

Career history
- 1991-1995: Fenerbahçe
- 1995-1997: TED Ankara Kolejliler
- 1997-1999: Muratpaşa Belediyesi
- 1999–2000: Türk Telekom B.K.
- 2000-2001: Mydonose Kolejliler
- 2001–2007: Fenerbahçe
- 2007–2008: Alpella
- 2008–2009: Bodrumspor

Zeki Gülay (born 15 August 1972 in Istanbul, Turkey) is a former Turkish basketball player. He mostly played for Fenerbahçe in his career. The center was 2.06 m tall, weighed 129 kg, and wore #14.

Zeki Gülay was the team captain of Fenerbahçe between 2003 and 2006.

== Career highlights ==
- 1994 Turkish President's Cup with Fenerbahçe
- 1999 Turkish Basketball Second League Champion with Vestel
- 2007 Turkish Basketball League Champion with Fenerbahçe
