= Serdar Apaydın =

Turkish basketball player (born 1966)

Serdar Apaydın

Serdar Apaydın (born 21 October 1966 in Turkey) is a retired Turkish professional basketball player and former assistant coach of Fenerbahçe. He is the current Head Coach of Antalya B.B.

He was famous with his spectacular 3 point shoots and helped lot of times to Turkey national basketball team. The former shooting guard and small forward is 1.98 m. He finish his career for make his army duty in 2001.

== Career ==
- 1986-90 Çukurova Sanayi
- 1992-93 Galatasaray
- 1993-97 Ülkerspor
- 1997-01 Fenerbahçe
