= Will Solomon =

American basketball player (born 1978)

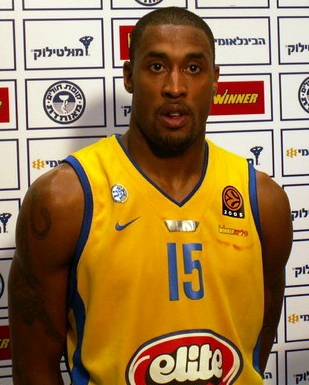
- Solomon with Maccabi Tel Aviv in 2005

Personal information
- Born: July 20, 1978 (age 48) Hartford, Connecticut, U.S.
- Listed height: 6 ft 1 in (1.85 m)
- Listed weight: 185 lb (84 kg)

Career information
- High school: East Hartford (Hartford, Connecticut)
- College: Clemson (1998–2001)
- NBA draft: 2001: 2nd round, 33rd overall pick
- Drafted by: Vancouver Grizzlies
- Playing career: 2001–2019
- Position: Point guard / shooting guard
- Number: 5, 15, 1

Career history
- 2001–2002: Memphis Grizzlies
- 2002–2003: Aris Thessaloniki
- 2003–2004: Hapoel Jerusalem
- 2004–2005: Efes Pilsen
- 2005–2006: Maccabi Tel Aviv
- 2006–2008: Fenerbahçe
- 2008–2009: Toronto Raptors
- 2009: Sacramento Kings
- 2009: Fenerbahçe
- 2010–2011: Hapoel Jerusalem
- 2011–2012: Cherkaski Mavpy
- 2012–2013: Mersin BB
- 2013–2017: Shark Antibes
- 2018–2019: AS Salé

Career highlights
- ULEB Cup champion (2004); FIBA EuroCup champion (2003); 3× Turkish League champion (2005, 2007, 2008); Turkish League All-Star (2007); Turkish President's Cup winner (2008); Israeli League champion (2006); Israeli Cup winner (2006); French League All-Star (2016); First-team All-ACC (2000); Second-team All-ACC (2001)
- Stats at NBA.com
- Stats at Basketball Reference

William James Solomon (born July 20, 1978) is an American former professional basketball player. Standing at 6 ft 1 in (1.85 m), he plays at the point guard and shooting guard positions. He played parts of two seasons in the National Basketball Association (NBA), and three seasons in the Israeli Basketball Premier League.

== Amateur career ==
Solomon was first noticed at East Hartford High School in East Hartford, Connecticut. He held several records and is in several clubs in their schools basketball program, such as "1000 Career Points", "All State", "All Conference", and the only member of the "NBA Draft" club. He went to Clemson where he continued his basketball career. He was named first-team All-Atlantic Coast Conference (ACC) as a junior, and made the second team as a senior.

== Professional career ==
Solomon declared himself eligible for the 2001 NBA draft after his junior year at Clemson University. He was selected by the Vancouver Grizzlies in the second round, with the 32nd overall pick. Solomon played for the Grizzlies in the 2001–02 season and averaged 5.2 points, 1.5 assists and 1.1 rebounds over 62 games.

After only one year in the NBA, Solomon decided to move to Europe and signed a contract with the Greek team Aris Thessaloniki in 2003. That year he won the FIBA EuroCup Challenge, 4th-tier European competition.

After a year in Greece, Solomon moved to Israel and played for Hapoel Jerusalem, with whom he won another European title, the ULEB Cup, 2nd-tier European competition. In Israel, he was often nicknamed "The Fish" (Ha-dag, הדג), as in Hebrew his last name resembles "Salmon" much more than King Solomon, which is pronounced "Shlomo."

For 2004–05, he moved to Turkey and was signed by Efes Pilsen. He then played for the first time in his career in the EuroLeague. With the help of Solomon, Efes Pilsen won the Turkish championship that year.

Solomon moved back to Israel the following season and was signed by Maccabi Tel Aviv, who were the European champions the previous two seasons and were close to winning a third consecutive EuroLeague title before losing in the final. After this, he returned to Istanbul and joined Fenerbahçe, that enjoyed a high budget and a EuroLeague spot after the Ülker Food Group decided to close their own team and move their entire support of funds and players to Fenerbahçe Ülker's basketball team. Nicknamed 'King Solomon' by the Fenerbahçe fans, he helped the team win two championships.

Solomon also played point guard for the Washington Wizards summer league team in Las Vegas during the NBA's off-season in 2006.

On July 28, 2008, Solomon was signed by the Toronto Raptors.

On February 19, 2009, Solomon was traded to the Sacramento Kings in a three-team deal that sent Patrick O'Bryant to the Raptors from the Boston Celtics and a conditional second round pick in 2014 to the Celtics. Shortly after being traded to the Sacramento Kings, Will Solomon was waived.

Solomon's final NBA game was played on April 3, 2009, in a 111 - 139 loss to the Phoenix Suns where Solomon recorded no stats in 3 minutes of playing time.

On April 9, 2009, the Turkish champions Fenerbahçe reached an agreement with him in order to bring him back to his former team, but he was released from his contract on November 7, 2009.

In August 2010, he returned to Israel and signed a one-year contract with pro club Hapoel Jerusalem.

In the summer of 2011, he signed a contract with the Ukrainian team Cherkaski Mavpy.

In October 2012, he signed a contract with Mersin BB of the Turkish Basketball League for the 2012–13 season.

In November 2013, he signed with the French team Shark Antibes.

== Career statistics ==
Legend
GP	Games played	GS	Games started	MPG	Minutes per game
FG%	Field-goal percentage	3P%	3-point field-goal percentage	FT%	Free-throw percentage
RPG	Rebounds per game	APG	Assists per game	SPG	Steals per game
BPG	Blocks per game	PPG	Points per game	PIR	Performance index rating
**Bold**	Career high

=== NBA ===
==== Regular season ====
Year	Team	GP	GS	MPG	FG%	3P%	FT%	RPG	APG	SPG	BPG	PPG
2001–02	Memphis	**62**	4	**14.1**	.341	.284	.671	1.1	1.5	**.6**	**.1**	**5.2**
2008–09	Toronto	39	**9**	13.9	**.436**	.263	**.833**	1.1	**3.2**	.5	**.1**	4.9
2008–09	Sacramento	14	0	12.0	.406	**.448**	.500	**1.5**	.7	.5	.0	5.0
Career		115	13	13.8	.378	.298	.692	1.1	2.0	.5	.1	5.1

=== EuroLeague ===
Year	Team	GP	GS	MPG	FG%	3P%	FT%	RPG	APG	SPG	BPG	PPG	PIR
2004–05	Efes Pilsen	23	**23**	30.3	.433	.348	.785	2.4	2.6	**2.0**	**.3**	14.5	14.0
2005–06	Maccabi	**25**	**23**	**32.2**	.464	.386	.798	2.4	3.0	**2.0**	.2	15.0	13.6
2006–07	Fenerbahçe	11	10	32.1	.422	**.388**	**.889**	2.9	3.8	1.9	**.3**	13.6	11.6
2007–08	Fenerbahçe	21	21	31.1	**.466**	.378	.818	**3.1**	**3.9**	1.7	.1	**17.9**	**18.0**
2009–10	Fenerbahçe	2	2	26.3	.333	.250	.800	1.0	1.5	.5	.0	9.0	3.5
Career		82	79	31.2	.448	.370	.806	2.6	3.2	1.9	.2	15.3	14.4
