= 2023–24 Fenerbahçe S.K. (basketball) season =

110th season

Fenerbahçe Beko
2023–24 season
- President: Ali Koç
- Head coach: Dimitris Itoudis (until 13 December 2023); Šarūnas Jasikevičius (from 14 December 2023)
- Arena: Ülker Sports and Event Hall
- Basketbol Süper Ligi: 2nd
- Playoffs: Champions
- EuroLeague: 4th Place
- Turkish Basketball Cup: Champions

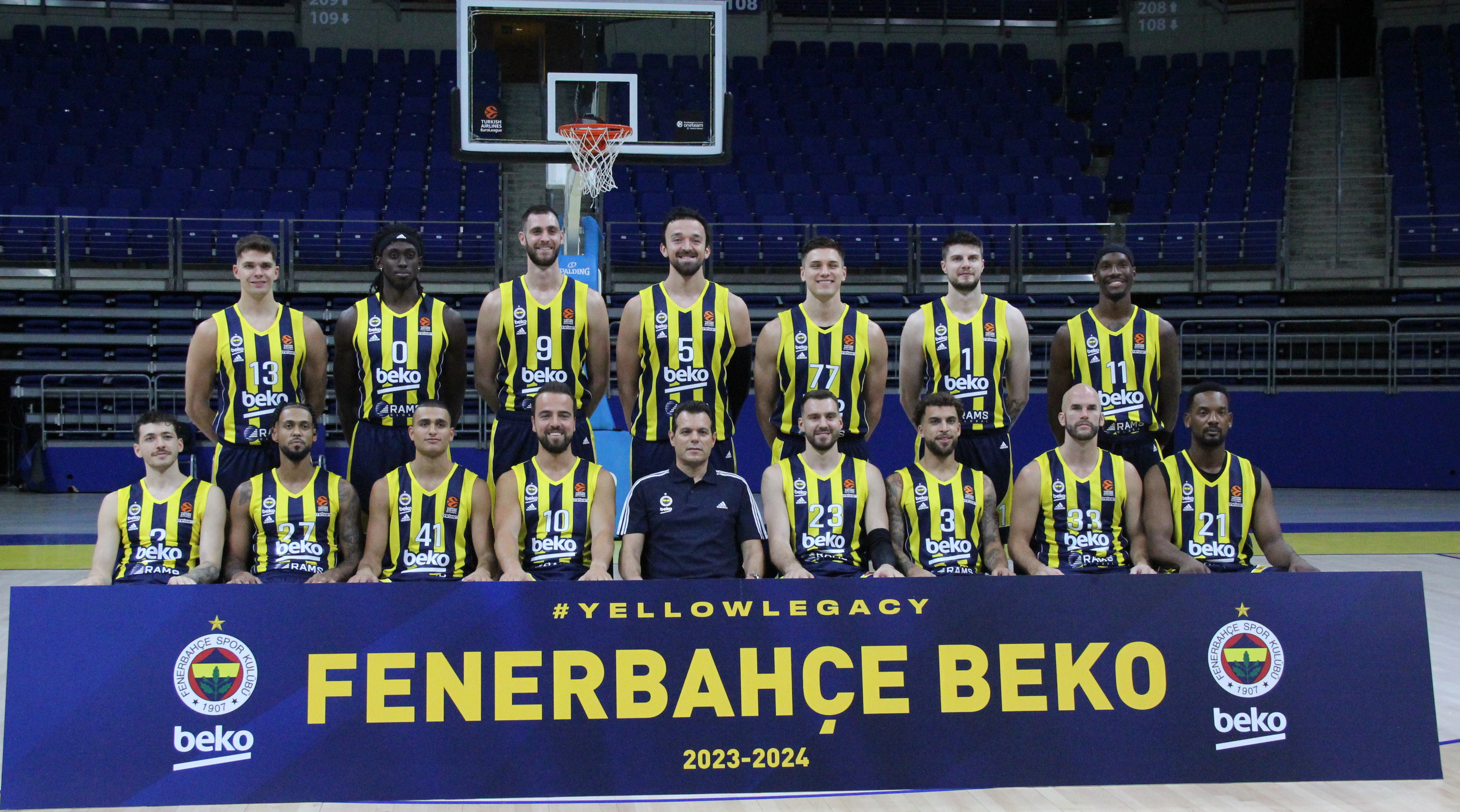
2023-24 roster

The 2023–24 season was Fenerbahçe's 110th season in the existence of the club. The team played in the Basketbol Süper Ligi and in the EuroLeague.

== Club ==
=== Board of directors ===
Position	Staff
Chairman	(Turkey) Ali Koç
Deputy Chairman	(Turkey) Erol Bilecik
General Secretary	(Turkey) Burak Çağlan Kızılhan
Board Member	(Turkey) Mehmet Dereli
Board Member	(Turkey) Fethi Pekin
Board Member	(Turkey) Acar Sertaç Komsuoğlu
Board Member	(Turkey) Simla Türker Bayazıt
Board Member	(Turkey) Hüseyin Arslan
Board Member	(Turkey) Esin Güral Argat
Board Member	(Turkey) Ahmet Ketenci
Board Member	(Turkey) Mustafa Kemal Danabaş
Board Member	(Turkey) Agah Ruşen Çetin
Board Member	(Turkey) Selma Altay Rodopman
Board Member	(Turkey) Ömer Okan
Board Member	(Turkey) Selahattin Baki

Last updated: 6 March 2023
Source: Fenerbahce.org

=== Staff ===
Position	Staff
General Director	(Italy) Maurizio Gherardini
Head Coach	(Lithuania) Šarūnas Jasikevičius
General Manager	(Turkey) Derya Yannier
Team Manager	(Turkey) Cenk Renda
Director of Basketball Operations	(Turkey) Defne Patır
Finance Officer	(Turkey) Murat Gök
Communication and Media Specialist	(Turkey) İlker Üçer
Social Media Manager	(Turkey) Gökhan Deniz
Marketing Manager	(Turkey) Ahmet Mert Gündüz
Ticketing Officer	(Turkey) Evren Gençoğlu
Assistant Coach	(Lithuania) Tomas Masiulis
Assistant Coach	(Slovenia) Radovan Trifunović
Assistant Coach	(Turkey) Erdem Bilmen
Assistant Coach	(Turkey) Alp Timuçin Yener
Conditioner	(Greece) Kostas Chatzichristos
Conditioner	(Turkey) İlker Belgutay
Doctor	(Turkey) Dr. Ahmet Kulduk
Physiotherapist	(Turkey) Rıza Özdemir
Physiotherapist	(Turkey) Şahir Uğur Sezer
Physiotherapist	(Greece) Kosmas Kontogiannis
Masseur	(Turkey) Yılmaz Mete
Masseur	(Turkey) Faik Özköksal
Equipment Manager	(Turkey) Erkan Karaca

Last updated: 14 December 2023
Source: Fenerbahce.org

== Players ==
=== Squad information ===
Note: Flags indicate national team eligibility at FIBA-sanctioned events. Players may hold other non-FIBA nationalities not displayed.

Fenerbahçe roster
Players
Coaches

Pos.	No.	Nat.	Name	Ht.	Wt.	Age
F	0	(United States)	Motley, Johnathan	2.06 m (6 ft 9 in)	104 kg (229 lb)	29 – 4 May 1995
F	1	(Turkey) (Republic of Ireland)	Birsen, Metecan	2.08 m (6 ft 10 in)	101 kg (223 lb)	29 – 6 April 1995
G	2	(Turkey)	Hazer, Şehmus	1.91 m (6 ft 3 in)	90 kg (198 lb)	25 – 15 February 1999
PG	3	(United States)	Wilbekin, Scottie	1.88 m (6 ft 2 in)	80 kg (176 lb)	31 – 5 April 1993
F/C	5	(Turkey)	Şanlı, Sertaç	2.13 m (7 ft 0 in)	115 kg (254 lb)	32 – 5 August 1991
C	9	(Greece)	Papagiannis, Georgios	2.20 m (7 ft 3 in)	121 kg (267 lb)	26 – 3 July 1997
G	10	(Turkey)	Mahmutoğlu, Melih (C)	1.91 m (6 ft 3 in)	85 kg (187 lb)	34 – 12 May 1990
F	11	(United States)	Hayes-Davis, Nigel	2.03 m (6 ft 8 in)	103 kg (227 lb)	29 – 16 December 1994
F	13	(Bosnia and Herzegovina) (Turkey)	Biberović, Tarik (DC)	2.01 m (6 ft 7 in)	100 kg (220 lb)	23 – 28 January 2001
PG	15	(Turkey)	Ekşioğlu, Mert Emre	1.88 m (6 ft 2 in)		22 – 2 January 2002
SF	17	(France)	Noua, Amine	2.02 m (6 ft 8 in)	91 kg (201 lb)	27 – 7 February 1997
F	21	(Canada)	Pierre, Dyshawn	1.98 m (6 ft 6 in)	104 kg (229 lb)	30 – 17 November 1993
SF	22	(Turkey)	Mestoğlu, Yiğit Hamza	2.03 m (6 ft 8 in)	93 kg (205 lb)	20 – 22 April 2004
SG	23	(Serbia)	Gudurić, Marko	1.98 m (6 ft 6 in)	91 kg (201 lb)	29 – 8 March 1995
G	27	(United States) (Greece)	Dorsey, Tyler	1.93 m (6 ft 4 in)	82 kg (181 lb)	27 – 18 December 1996
G/F	33	(Greece) (United States)	Calathes, Nick	1.98 m (6 ft 6 in)	97 kg (214 lb)	35 – 7 February 1989
PG	41	(Israel)	Madar, Yam	1.90 m (6 ft 3 in)	82 kg (181 lb)	23 – 21 December 2000
PF	77	(United States)	Sestina, Nate	2.06 m (6 ft 9 in)	106 kg (234 lb)	27 – 12 May 1997
PG		(Brazil)	Neto, Raul	1.88 m (6 ft 2 in)	82 kg (181 lb)	32 – 19 May 1992

Head coach

- (Lithuania) Šarūnas Jasikevičius

Assistant coach(es)

- (Lithuania) Tomas Masiulis
- (Slovenia) Radovan Trifunović
- (Turkey) Erdem Bilmen
- (Turkey) Alp Timuçin Yener

Athletic trainer(s)

- (Greece) Kostas Chatzichristos
- (Turkey) İlker Belgutay

Physiotherapist(s)

- (Turkey) Rıza Özdemir
- (Turkey) Şahir Uğur Sezer
- (Greece) Kosmas Kontogiannis

Team manager

- (Turkey) Cenk Renda

Legend

- (C) Team captain
- (DC) Dual citizenship
- Injured

- Roster
Updated: 25 May 2024

=== Depth chart ===
Pos.	Starting 5	Bench 1	Bench 2	Bench 3	Inactive
C	Johnathan Motley	Sertaç Şanlı	Georgios Papagiannis
PF	Nigel Hayes-Davis	Nate Sestina		Amine Noua
SF	Tarik Biberović	Dyshawn Pierre		Metecan Birsen	Yiğit Hamza Mestoğlu (injured)
SG	Marko Gudurić	Tyler Dorsey		Melih Mahmutoğlu	Mert Emre Ekşioğlu
PG	Nick Calathes	Scottie Wilbekin	Yam Madar	Şehmus Hazer	Raul Neto (injured)

=== Transactions ===
==== In ====
No.	Pos.	Nat.	Name	Age	Moving from		Ends	Date	Source
41	PG	(Israel)	Yam Madar	22	Partizan	(Serbia)	June 2025	12 July 2023	
5	C	(Turkey)	Sertaç Şanlı	31	Barcelona	(Spain)	June 2025	13 July 2023	
77	F/C	(United States)	Nate Sestina	26	Türk Telekom	(Turkey)	June 2024	14 July 2023	
9	C	(Greece)	Georgios Papagiannis	26	Panathinaikos	(Greece)	June 2025	15 July 2023	
19	PG	(Brazil)	Raul Neto	31	Cleveland Cavaliers	(United States)	June 2024	5 August 2023	
22	F	(Turkey)	Yiğit Hamza Mestoğlu	19	UCAM Murcia	(Spain)	June 2024	7 August 2023	
32	G	(Latvia)	Arturs Zagars	23	BC Nevėžis	(Lithuania)	June 2026	18 September 2023	
17	PF	(France)	Amine Noua	26	Derthona Basket	(Italy)	June 2024	22 January 2024	

==== Out ====
No.	Pos.	Nat.	Name	Age	Moving to		Date	Source
37	C	(Greece)	Kostas Antetokounmpo	25	Panathinaikos	(Greece)	20 June 2023	
5	PG	(Turkey)	İsmet Akpınar	28	Galatasaray Nef	(Turkey)	22 June 2023	
9	PF	(Turkey)	Samet Geyik	30	Galatasaray Nef	(Turkey)	4 July 2023	
31	F/C	(United States)	Devin Booker	32	Bayern Munich	(Germany)	12 July 2023	
4	PG	(United States)	Carsen Edwards	25	Bayern Munich	(Germany)	12 July 2023	
22	C	(Nigeria)	Tonye Jekiri	28	CSKA Moscow	(Russia)	14 July 2023	
8	PF	(Serbia)	Nemanja Bjelica	35	Crvena Zvezda	(Serbia)	12 September 2023	

==== Out on loan ====
No.	Pos.	Nat.	Name	Age	Moving to		Date	Source
	G	(Latvia)	Artūrs Žagars	23	BC Wolves	(Lithuania)	18 September 2023	

== Pre-season and friendlies ==
=== Friendly matches ===
6 September 2023 Friendly	Fenerbahçe Beko (Turkish Basketball Federation)	100–93(OT)	(Turkish Basketball Federation) Bahçeşehir Koleji	Istanbul
18:00 TRT (UTC+3)	Scoring by quarter: 28–15, 19–28, 12–26, 28–18, Overtime: 13–6
	Pts: Motley 26; Rebs: Şanlı 7 Asts: Hazer 12	Boxscore		Arena: Ülker Sports Arena

11 September 2023 Friendly	Fenerbahçe Beko (Turkish Basketball Federation)	75–60	(Russian Basketball Federation) Zenit Saint Petersburg	Istanbul
18:00 TRT (UTC+3)	Scoring by quarter: 22–19, 16–18, 16–9, 21–14
	Pts: Motley 19	Boxscore		Arena: Ülker Sports Arena

15 September 2023 Nikos Galis Tournament	Fenerbahçe Beko (Turkish Basketball Federation)	78–82	(Israeli Basketball Association) Maccabi Playtika Tel Aviv	Rhodes
16:00 EEST (UTC+3)	Scoring by quarter: 20–26, 15–15, 26–29, 17–12
	Pts: Şanlı 15	Boxscore		Arena: Kallithea Palais des Sports

16 September 2023 Nikos Galis Tournament	Fenerbahçe Beko (Turkish Basketball Federation)	79–66	(Hellenic Basketball Federation) Panathinaikos	Rhodes
17:00 EEST (UTC+3)	Scoring by quarter: 15–12, 14–15, 17–14, 33–25
	Pts: Şanlı 21	Boxscore		Arena: Kallithea Palais des Sports

21 September 2023 VTB United League Supercup; Quarterfinals	MBA Moscow (Russian Basketball Federation)	79–94	(Turkish Basketball Federation) Fenerbahçe Beko	Moscow
17:00 MSK (UTC+3)	Scoring by quarter: 21–16, 22–27, 14–27, 22–24
	Pts: Kasatkin 15; Rebs: Kasatkin 5 Asts: Kasatkin 9	Boxscore	Pts: Motley 21; Rebs: Sestina 7 Asts: Wilbekin, Madar 4	Arena: VTB Arena; Attendance: 733; Referees: Aleksey Davydov, Artem Lavrukhin, Yaroslav Oreshin

23 September 2023 VTB United League Supercup; Semifinals	Fenerbahçe Beko (Turkish Basketball Federation)	89–105	(Russian Basketball Federation) Lokomotiv Kuban	Moscow
17:00 MSK (UTC+3)	Scoring by quarter: 36–24, 22–27, 17–29, 14–25
	Pts: Motley, Şanlı 13; Rebs: Gudurić, Papagiannis 4 Asts: Motley, Gudurić 4	Boxscore	Pts: Akoon-Purcell 25; Rebs: Martiuk 6 Asts: Emchenko 6	Arena: VTB Arena; Attendance: 1,543; Referees: Ilia Putenko, Sergey Beliakov, Andrey Sharapa

24 September 2023 VTB United League Supercup; Third place game	Fenerbahçe Beko (Turkish Basketball Federation)	82–80	(Russian Basketball Federation) Pari Nizhny Novgorod	Moscow
17:00 MSK (UTC+3)	Scoring by quarter: 24–17, 17–21, 20–23, 21–19
	Pts: Motley 22; Rebs: Motley 5 Asts: Calathes 7	Boxscore	Pts: Allen 19; Rebs: Belenitskii 6 Asts: Khvostov 6	Arena: VTB Arena; Attendance: 852; Referees: Ilia Putenko, Stanislav Valeev, Anton Kruglov

== Competitions ==
=== Overview ===
Competition	First match	Last match	Starting round	Final position	Record							
Competition	First match	Last match	Starting round	Final position	Pld	W	D	L	PF	PA	PD	Win %
Basketball Super League	1 October 2023	12 June 2024	Round 1	Winners	39	33	0	6	3,602	2,986	+616	84.62
EuroLeague	6 October 2023	26 May 2024	Round 1	4th	41	23	0	18	3,449	3,312	+137	56.10
Turkish Basketball Cup	14 February 2024	18 February 2024	Quarterfinals	Winners	3	3	0	0	260	203	+57	100.00
Total					83	59	0	24	7,311	6,501	+810	71.08

Source: Competitions

=== Basketball Super League ===
==== League table ====
Pos	Team	Pld	W	L	PF	PA	PD	Pts	Qualification or relegation
1	Anadolu Efes	30	25	5	2613	2417	+196	55	Advance to playoffs
2	Fenerbahçe Beko (C)	30	25	5	2773	2308	+465	55	Advance to playoffs
3	Beşiktaş Emlakjet	30	21	9	2462	2236	+226	51	Advance to playoffs
4	Pınar Karşıyaka	30	21	9	2691	2531	+160	51	Advance to playoffs
5	Galatasaray Ekmas	30	16	14	2544	2479	+65	46	Advance to playoffs

Source: Basketbol Süper Ligi
(C) Champions

==== Results summary ====
Overall						Home					Away				
Pld	W	L	PF	PA	PD	W	L	PF	PA	PD	W	L	PF	PA	PD
30	25	5	2773	2308	+465	14	1	1432	1138	+294	11	4	1341	1170	+171

Source: TBF.org.tr

==== Results by round ====
Round	1	2	3	4	5	6	7	8	9	10	11	12	13	14	15	16	17	18	19	20	21	22	23	24	25	26	27	28	29	30
Ground	H	A	H	A	H	A	H	A	H	A	A	H	A	H	A	A	H	A	H	A	H	A	H	A	H	H	A	H	A	H
Result	W	L	W	W	W	W	W	W	W	L	L	W	W	W	W	W	W	W	W	W	W	W	W	W	W	L	L	W	W	W
Position	1	3	2	2	1	1	1	1	1	2	2	2	2	2	2	2	2	2	2	2	2	2	2	2	2	2	2	2	2	2

Source: TBF.org.tr
A = Away; H = Home; W = Win; L = Loss

==== Matches ====
Note: All times are TRT (UTC+3) as listed by Turkish Basketball Federation.

1 October 2023 1	Fenerbahçe Beko	95–58	Çağdaş Bodrumspor	Istanbul
18:00	Scoring by quarter: 30–17, 21–13, 33–16, 11–12
	Pts: Dorsey 17; Rebs: Sestina 6 Asts: Madar 12; PIR: Madar 21	Boxscore	Pts: Artis 17; Rebs: Moore 7 Asts: Johnson 3 PIR: Alibegović 17	Arena: Ülker Sports Arena; Referees: Ali Serkan Emlek, Tolga Edis, Batuhan Söylemezoğlu

9 October 2023 2	Pınar Karşıyaka	84–79	Fenerbahçe Beko	İzmir
20:30	Scoring by quarter: 20–22, 25–16, 22–15, 17–26
	Pts: McCollum 15; Rebs: Martin 8 Asts: McCollum 9 PIR: McCollum 18	Boxscore	Pts: Motley 25; Rebs: Sestina 8 Asts: Madar 7 PIR: Motley 28	Arena: Karşıyaka Arena; Referees: Can Mavisu, Hüseyin Çelik, Erhan Gürsel

15 October 2023 3	Fenerbahçe Beko	113–98	Bahçeşehir Koleji	Istanbul
18:00	Scoring by quarter: 34–28, 24–16, 27–33, 28–21
	Pts: Motley 25; Rebs: Hazer 6 Asts: Calathes 10; PIR: Motley 27	Boxscore	Pts: Scrubb 26; Rebs: Cavanaugh 9 Asts: Bouteille 6 PIR: Scrubb 28	Arena: Ülker Sports Arena; Referees: Özlem Yalman, Alper Özgök, İsmail Binbir

22 October 2023 4	Galatasaray Nef	62–74	Fenerbahçe Beko	Istanbul
20:30	Scoring by quarter: 18–22, 17–16, 15–18, 12–18
	Pts: Kabaca 16; Rebs: Radebaugh 6 Asts: Walden 5 PIR: Kabaca 16	Boxscore	Pts: Madar 15; Rebs: Hayes, Calathes 6 Asts: Calathes 6 PIR: Calathes 21	Arena: Sinan Erdem Dome; Referees: Emin Moğulkoç, Mehmet Karabilecen, Çağlar Özkan

29 October 2023 5	Fenerbahçe Beko	83–53	Reeder Samsunspor	Istanbul
18:00	Scoring by quarter: 22–12, 11–17, 22–12, 28–12
	Pts: Şanlı 19; Rebs: Papagiannis 12; Asts: Hazer 7 PIR: Şanlı 29	Boxscore	Pts: Crawford 12; Rebs: Levi 8 Asts: Crawford 8 PIR: Crawford 16	Arena: Ülker Sports Arena; Referees: Yener Yılmaz, Ahmet Tatlıcı, Burak Yılmaz

5 November 2023 6	Tofaş	86–95	Fenerbahçe Beko	Bursa
20:30	Scoring by quarter: 19–30, 23–23, 28–21, 16–21
	Pts: Wiley 18; Rebs: Wiley 14; Asts: Geçim 8 PIR: Geçim, Wiley	Boxscore	Pts: Hayes 25; Rebs: Hayes, Motley 8 Asts: Calathes 8 PIR: Hayes, Motley 27	Arena: Tofaş Spor Salonu; Referees: Kaan Büyükçil, Ali Şakacı, Kerem Yılmaz

11 November 2023 7	Fenerbahçe Beko	90–64	Yukatel Merkezefendi Basket	Istanbul
20:30	Scoring by quarter: 18–17, 15–16, 24–16, 33–15
	Pts: Motley 16; Rebs: Sestina 9 Asts: Wilbekin 6 PIR: Wilbekin 23	Boxscore	Pts: Mason 19; Rebs: Bleijenbergh 8 Asts: Mason 5 PIR: Mason 23	Arena: Ülker Sports Arena; Referees: Mehmet Şahin, Fatih Güler, Yiğit Gönültaş

19 November 2023 8	Manisa BB	69–82	Fenerbahçe Beko	Manisa
18:00	Scoring by quarter: 16–16, 14–19, 20–24, 19–23
	Pts: Cruz 18; Rebs: Arar 9 Asts: Cruz 5 PIR: Terry 19	Boxscore	Pts: Motley 22; Rebs: Sestina 8 Asts: Wilbekin 7 PIR: Wilbekin 27	Arena: Muradiye Sports Hall; Referees: Fatih Arslanoğlu, Musa Kazım Çetin, Nazlı Çisil Güngör

26 November 2023 9	Fenerbahçe Beko	96–85	Petkim Spor	Istanbul
18:00	Scoring by quarter: 26–16, 32–24, 20–17, 18–28
	Pts: Şanlı 19; Rebs: Hayes 6 Asts: Calathes 7 PIR: Hayes 22	Boxscore	Pts: Agva 21; Rebs: Aldridge, Thomas 4 Asts: Efianayi 7 PIR: Thomas 21	Arena: Ülker Sports Arena; Referees: Kaan Büyükçil, Ayşe Nur Yazıcıoğlu, Göksun Öz

2 December 2023 10	Beşiktaş Emlakjet	68–64	Fenerbahçe Beko	Istanbul
20:30	Scoring by quarter: 19–15, 12–9, 16–21, 21–19
	Pts: Needham 15; Rebs: Mitchell 10; Asts: four players 2 PIR: Mitchell 13	Boxscore	Pts: Hayes 18; Rebs: Şanlı 10; Asts: Gudurić 5 PIR: Şanlı 21	Arena: Akatlar Arena; Referees: Emin Moğulkoç, Özlem Yalman, Umut Özgün Ergün

11 December 2023 11	Anadolu Efes	81–80	Fenerbahçe Beko	Istanbul
19:00	Scoring by quarter: 24–21, 25–23, 20–15, 12–21
	Pts: Thompson 21; Rebs: Jones, Osmani 8 Asts: Larkin 10; PIR: Thompson 23	Boxscore	Pts: Wilbekin 18; Rebs: three players 6 Asts: Calathes 6 PIR: Wilbekin 19	Arena: Sinan Erdem Dome; Referees: Ali Serkan Emlek, Ali Şakacı, Alper Özgök

17 December 2023 12	Fenerbahçe Beko	99–71	Türk Telekom	Istanbul
18:00	Scoring by quarter: 26–18, 20–10, 25–20, 28–23
	Pts: Dorsey 19; Rebs: Dorsey 8 Asts: Madar 5 PIR: Dorsey 21	Boxscore	Pts: Enoch 16; Rebs: Enoch 7 Asts: Wallace 6 PIR: Enoch 21	Arena: Ülker Sports Arena; Referees: Mehmet Şahin, Can Mavisu, Tolga Edis

25 December 2023 13	Darüşşafaka Lassa	56–98	Fenerbahçe Beko	Istanbul
19:00	Scoring by quarter: 14–29, 15–22, 12–25, 15–22
	Pts: Korkmaz, Timma 14; Rebs: Carlton 8 Asts: Abdur-Rahkman 6 PIR: Abdur-Rahkman, Carlton 14	Boxscore	Pts: Biberović 29; Rebs: Papagiannis 12; Asts: Hazer 8 PIR: Biberović 34	Arena: Ayhan Şahenk Sports Hall; Referees: Mehmet Karabilecen, Musa Kazım Çetin, Murat Ciner

30 December 2023 14	Fenerbahçe Beko	97–90	Bursaspor İnfo Yatırım	Istanbul
18:00	Scoring by quarter: 25–19, 19–29, 29–23, 24–19
	Pts: Madar 25; Rebs: Madar 13; Asts: Madar 4 PIR: Madar 39	Boxscore	Pts: Floyd 31; Rebs: Brown, Hamilton 7 Asts: Young 6 PIR: Floyd 24	Arena: Ülker Sports Arena; Referees: Kerem Baki, Ziya Özorhon, Fatih Güler

6 January 2024 15	ONVO Büyükçekmece	58–89	Fenerbahçe Beko	Istanbul
20:30	Scoring by quarter: 15–20, 11–28, 19–24, 13–17
	Pts: Onar, Reed 11; Rebs: Koşut 8 Asts: Ray 4 PIR: Koşut, Onar 11	Boxscore	Pts: Dorsey 24; Rebs: Şanlı 7 Asts: Hazer 5 PIR: Dorsey 28	Arena: Gazanfer Bilge Sports Hall; Referees: Altuğ Köselerli, Hüseyin Çelik, Batuhan Söylemezoğlu

14 January 2024 16	Çağdaş Bodrumspor	92–93	Fenerbahçe Beko	Bodrum, Muğla
13:00	Scoring by quarter: 18–24, 20–16, 26–29, 28–24
	Pts: Johnson 29; Rebs: Alibegović 8 Asts: Warren 5 PIR: Johnson 31	Boxscore	Pts: Mahmutoğlu 27; Rebs: Papagiannis 5 Asts: Wilbekin 8 PIR: Wilbekin 26	Arena: Bodrum Sports Hall; Referees: Yener Yılmaz, Polat Parlak, Duhan Köyiçi

21 January 2023 17	Fenerbahçe Beko	93–63	Pınar Karşıyaka	Istanbul
20:30	Scoring by quarter: 16–18, 29–12, 26–18, 22–15
	Pts: Şanlı 17; Rebs: Motley 7 Asts: Gudurić 7 PIR: Şanlı 18	Boxscore	Pts: Carey 18; Rebs: Carey 7 Asts: Sipahi 5 PIR: Carey 24	Arena: Ülker Sports Arena; Referees: Emin Moğulkoç, Ali Şakacı, Orhan Çağrı Hekimoğlu

27 January 2024 18	Bahçeşehir Koleji	105–110(OT)	Fenerbahçe Beko	Istanbul
20:30	Scoring by quarter: 19–21, 14–28, 31–23, 32–24, Overtime: 9–14
	Pts: Bouteille, Cavanaugh 23; Rebs: Arna 8 Asts: Scrubb 5 PIR: Bouteille, Cavanaugh 22	Boxscore	Pts: Mahmutoğlu 21; Rebs: Hazer 10; Asts: Madar 9 PIR: Hazer, Mahmutoğlu 23	Arena: Ülker Sports Arena; Referees: Mehmet Şahin, Can Mavisu, Kerem Yılmaz

4 February 2024 19	Fenerbahçe Beko	90–74	Galatasaray Nef	Istanbul
20:30	Scoring by quarter: 16–19, 26–16, 19–15, 29–24
	Pts: Motley 15; Rebs: Calathes 10; Asts: Calathes 12; PIR: Calathes 22	Boxscore	Pts: Yeboah 16; Rebs: McCormack 8 Asts: Tuncer 7 PIR: Tuncer 18	Arena: Ülker Sports Arena; Referees: Mehmet Karabilecen, Ahmet Tatlıcı, Murat Ciner

11 February 2024 20	Reeder Samsunspor	75–96	Fenerbahçe Beko	Samsun
15:30	Scoring by quarter: 24–20, 16–21, 19–35, 16–20
	Pts: Henry, Washington 17; Rebs: Baş 5 Asts: Washington 10; PIR: Henry 23	Boxscore	Pts: Motley 36; Rebs: Motley 10; Asts: Madar 10; PIR: Motley 38	Arena: Mustafa Dağıstanlı Sports Hall; Referees: Ali Serkan Emlek, Duhan Köyiçi, Göksun Öz

3 March 2024 21	Fenerbahçe Beko	109–77	Tofaş	Istanbul
20:30	Scoring by quarter: 30–13, 32–15, 25–23, 22–26
	Pts: Şanlı 24; Rebs: Sestina 7 Asts: Madar 10; PIR: Madar 33	Boxscore	Pts: Homesley 24; Rebs: Wiley 15; Asts: Homesley 7 PIR: Homesley 26	Arena: Ülker Sports Arena; Referees: Kerem Baki, Mehmet Serdar Ünal, Sinem Tetik Akbayrak

9 March 2024 22	Yukatel Merkezefendi Basket	68–93	Fenerbahçe Beko	Denizli
18:00	Scoring by quarter: 16–19, 14–29, 23–24, 15–21
	Pts: Mason 24; Rebs: Mustafa 7 Asts: Mason 3 PIR: Mason 20	Boxscore	Pts: Dorsey 18; Rebs: Motley 8 Asts: Madar 9 PIR: Şanlı 19	Arena: Pamukkale University Arena; Referees: Ali Şakacı, Tolga Edis, Umut Özgün Ergün

16 March 2024 23	Fenerbahçe Beko	98–82	Manisa BB	Istanbul
20:30	Scoring by quarter: 21–29, 26–15, 23–19, 28–19
	Pts: Dorsey 17; Rebs: Papagiannis 9 Asts: Madar 9 PIR: Papagiannis 20	Boxscore	Pts: Cruz 23; Rebs: Luther 8 Asts: Russell 5 PIR: Terry 22	Arena: Ülker Sports Arena; Referees: Hüseyin Çelik, Alper Özgök, Berk Kurtulmuş

25 March 2024 24	Petkim Spor	59–81	Fenerbahçe Beko	Aliağa, İzmir
20:30	Scoring by quarter: 8–21, 19–10, 15–23, 17–27
	Pts: Zoriks 14; Rebs: Agva, Aldridge 7 Asts: Zoriks 5 PIR: Aldridge 16	Boxscore	Pts: Hazer 13; Rebs: Papagiannis 8 Asts: Calathes 6 PIR: Madar 21	Arena: Enka Sport Hall; Referees: Yener Yılmaz, Ahmet Tatlıcı, Tolga Akkuşoğlu

18 April 2024 (Note: Fenerbahçe Beko - Beşiktaş Emlakjet match scheduled to be played on Tuesday, April 2nd, has been postponed to April 18th due to Beşiktaş Emlakjet's EuroCup Semi-Final 3rd match.) 25	Fenerbahçe Beko	87–66	Beşiktaş Emlakjet	Istanbul
19:30	Scoring by quarter: 25–21, 23–9, 22–20, 17–16
	Pts: Wilbekin 18; Rebs: Calathes 7 Asts: Calathes 7 PIR: Wilbekin 22	Boxscore	Pts: Mathews 17; Rebs: Delgado 10; Asts: Needham 6 PIR: Mitchell 18	Arena: Ülker Sports Arena; Referees: Emin Moğulkoç, Alper Özgök, Erhan Gürsel

8 April 2024 26	Fenerbahçe Beko	80–90	Anadolu Efes	Istanbul
20:30	Scoring by quarter: 19–22, 21–20, 23–20, 17–28
	Pts: Biberović 19; Rebs: Biberović 6 Asts: Calathes, Gudurić 5 PIR: Gudurić 18	Boxscore	Pts: Larkin, Osmani 22; Rebs: three players 7 Asts: Clyburn, Larkin 5 PIR: Osmani 28	Arena: Ülker Sports Arena; Referees: Yener Yılmaz, Sinem Tetik Akbayrak, Duhan Köyiçi

15 April 2024 27	Türk Telekom	95–91	Fenerbahçe Beko	Ankara
20:30	Scoring by quarter: 20–20, 24–22, 26–19, 25–30
	Pts: Wallace 22; Rebs: Jones, Şav 6 Asts: Wallace 6 PIR: Wallace 23	Boxscore	Pts: Biberović 23; Rebs: four players 4 Asts: Biberović, Madar 4 PIR: Biberović 25	Arena: Ankara Arena; Referees: Zafer Yılmaz, Seher Ayşenur Yazıcıoğlu, Burak Yılmaz

20 April 2024 28	Fenerbahçe Beko	110–77	Darüşşafaka Lassa	Istanbul
15:30	Scoring by quarter: 35–20, 22–25, 27–13, 26–19
	Pts: Hayes-Davis 19; Rebs: Dorsey, Şanlı 6 Asts: Hazer 5 PIR: Hayes-Davis 21	Boxscore	Pts: Yaşar 23; Rebs: Pandi 7 Asts: Adams 9 PIR: Pandi 23	Arena: Ülker Sports Arena; Referees: Mehmet Karabilecen, Hüseyin Çelik, Göksun Öz

11 May 2024 29	Bursaspor İnfo Yatırım	112–116(OT)	Fenerbahçe Beko	Bursa
19:00	Scoring by quarter: 25–25, 15–26, 28–17, 28–28, Overtime: 16–20
	Pts: Brown 34; Rebs: Young 10; Asts: Neal, Young 6 PIR: Brown 36	Boxscore	Pts: Madar, Noua 20; Rebs: Noua 10; Asts: Hazer 8 PIR: Noua 27	Arena: Tofaş Spor Salonu; Referees: Emin Moğulkoç, Musa Kazım Çetin, Yiğit Gönültaş

13 May 2024 30	Fenerbahçe Beko	92–90	ONVO Büyükçekmece	Istanbul
18:00	Scoring by quarter: 22–19, 15–19, 25–21, 30–31
	Pts: Sestina 23; Rebs: Papagiannis, Şanlı 4 Asts: Calathes 16; PIR: Sestina 20	Boxscore	Pts: Reed 24; Rebs: Thomas 6 Asts: Pérez 6 PIR: Reed 29	Arena: Ülker Sports Arena; Referees: Mehmet Şahin, Ziya Özorhon, Batuhan Söylemezoğlu

===== Quarterfinals =====
Win Loss

16 May 2024 1	Fenerbahçe Beko	102–72 (Series: 1–0)	Petkim Spor	Istanbul
18:00 TRT (UTC+3)	Scoring by quarter: 28–14, 26–23, 25–15, 23–20
	Pts: Hayes-Davis 16; Rebs: three players 7 Asts: Calathes 7 PIR: Hayes-Davis 26	Boxscore	Pts: Zoriks 14; Rebs: Gültekin, Zoriks 6 Asts: Sonsırma 5 PIR: Zoriks 16	Arena: Ülker Sports Arena; Referees: Yener Yılmaz, Semih Vural, Kaan Büyükçil

18 May 2024 2	Petkim Spor	71–100 (Series: 0–2)	Fenerbahçe Beko	Aliağa, İzmir
18:00 TRT (UTC+3)	Scoring by quarter: 21–16, 15–32, 16–25, 19–27
	Pts: Gültekin 18; Rebs: Gültekin 7 Asts: Zoriks 6 PIR: Gültekin 23	Boxscore	Pts: Hayes-Davis 20; Rebs: Sestina 7 Asts: Wilbekin 7 PIR: Hayes-Davis 23	Arena: Enka Sport Hall; Referees: Özlem Yalman, Ali Şakacı, Tolga Edis

===== Semifinals =====
Win Loss

30 May 2024 1	Fenerbahçe Beko	96–88 (Series: 1–0)	Beşiktaş Emlakjet	Istanbul
20:30 TRT (UTC+3)	Scoring by quarter: 23–23, 33–25, 22–17, 18–23
	Pts: Hayes-Davis 29; Rebs: Biberović 7 Asts: Calathes 11; PIR: Hayes-Davis 27	Boxscore	Pts: Needham 24; Rebs: Arslan 7 Asts: Allman 5 PIR: Needham 23	Arena: Ülker Sports Arena; Referees: Can Mavisu, Ali Şakacı, Murat Ciner

1 June 2024 2	Fenerbahçe Beko	98–72 (Series: 2–0)	Beşiktaş Emlakjet	Istanbul
20:30 TRT (UTC+3)	Scoring by quarter: 22–24, 25–19, 25–9, 26–20
	Pts: Hayes-Davis 20; Rebs: Hayes-Davis 7 Asts: Hayes-Davis 3 PIR: Hayes-Davis 28	Boxscore	Pts: Simonović 16; Rebs: Simonović 7 Asts: Needham 5 PIR: Simonović 16	Arena: Ülker Sports Arena; Referees: Yener Yılmaz, Alper Altuğ Köselerli, Nazlı Çisil Güngör

3 June 2024 3	Beşiktaş Emlakjet	77–86 (Series: 0–3)	Fenerbahçe Beko	Istanbul
20:30 TRT (UTC+3)	Scoring by quarter: 20–23, 21–24, 24–15, 12–24
	Pts: Simonović 21; Rebs: Mathews 8 Asts: Mathews 7 PIR: Simonović 23	Boxscore	Pts: Hayes-Davis 21; Rebs: Calathes, Şanlı 7 Asts: Calathes 9 PIR: Calathes 29	Arena: Akatlar Arena; Referees: Emin Moğulkoç, Mehmet Serdar Ünal, Tolga Akkuşoğlu

===== Finals =====
Win Loss

6 June 2024 1	Anadolu Efes	74–85 (Series: 0–1)	Fenerbahçe Beko	Ataköy, Istanbul
20:30 TRT (UTC+3)	Scoring by quarter: 16–22, 20–29, 15–20, 23–14
	Pts: Osmani 18; Rebs: Osmani 6 Asts: Larkin 8 PIR: Osmani 21	Boxscore	Pts: Hayes-Davis 28; Rebs: four players 5 Asts: Calathes 11; PIR: Hayes-Davis 26	Arena: Sinan Erdem Dome; Referees: Kerem Baki, Mehmet Şahin, Ziya Özorhon

8 June 2024 2	Anadolu Efes	70–101 (Series: 0–2)	Fenerbahçe Beko	Ataköy, Istanbul
20:30 TRT (UTC+3)	Scoring by quarter: 16–31, 22–22, 13–25, 19–23
	Pts: Oturu 21; Rebs: Bryant, Oturu 9 Asts: Bryant 4 PIR: Oturu 25	Boxscore	Pts: Wilbekin 24; Rebs: Papagiannis 8 Asts: Calathes 8 PIR: Wilbekin 25	Arena: Sinan Erdem Dome; Referees: Emin Moğulkoç, Altuğ Köselerli, Semih Vural

10 June 2024 3	Fenerbahçe Beko	81–82 (Series: 2–1)	Anadolu Efes	Istanbul
20:30 TRT (UTC+3)	Scoring by quarter: 16–13, 23–21, 17–22, 25–26
	Pts: Wilbekin 17; Rebs: Hayes-Davis 5 Asts: Calathes 12; PIR: Calathes 20	Boxscore	Pts: Willis 20; Rebs: Larkin 5 Asts: Larkin 7 PIR: Willis 26	Arena: Ülker Sports Arena; Referees: Yener Yılmaz, Özlem Yalman, Hüseyin Çelik

12 June 2024 4	Fenerbahçe Beko	80–72(OT) (Series: 3–1)	Anadolu Efes	Istanbul
20:30 TRT (UTC+3)	Scoring by quarter: 22–8, 14–25, 15–19, 13–12, Overtime: 16–8
	Pts: Biberović 19; Rebs: Papagiannis 9 Asts: Calathes 10; PIR: Biberović 19	Boxscore	Pts: Bryant 20; Rebs: Oturu 7 Asts: Bryant, Larkin 4 PIR: Bryant 19	Arena: Ülker Sports Arena; Referees: Emin Moğulkoç, Kerem Baki, Can Mavisu

=== EuroLeague ===
==== League table ====
Pos	Team	Pld	W	L	PF	PA	PD	Qualification
4	(Spanish Basketball Federation) Barcelona	34	22	12	2812	2692	+120	Qualification to playoffs
5	(Hellenic Basketball Federation) Olympiacos	34	22	12	2658	2538	+120	Qualification to playoffs
6	(Turkish Basketball Federation) Fenerbahçe Beko	34	20	14	2855	2723	+132	Qualification to playoffs
7	(Israeli Basketball Association) Maccabi Playtika Tel Aviv	34	20	14	2969	2939	+30	Qualification to play-in
8	(Spanish Basketball Federation) Baskonia	34	18	16	2849	2867	−18	Qualification to play-in

Source: EuroLeague
Rules for classification: All points scored in extra period(s) were not counted in the standings, nor for any tie-break situation.

==== Results summary ====
Overall						Home					Away				
Pld	W	L	PF	PA	PD	W	L	PF	PA	PD	W	L	PF	PA	PD
34	20	14	2894	2751	+143	15	2	1576	1374	+202	5	12	1318	1377	−59

Source: EuroLeague

==== Results by round ====
Round	1	2	3	4	5	6	7	8	9	10	11	12	13	14	15	16	17	18	19	20	21	22	23	24	25	26	27	28	29	30	31	32	33	34
Ground	H	A	H	H	A	H	A	A	A	A	H	A	A	H	H	A	H	H	H	H	H	A	H	A	A	A	H	A	H	H	A	H	H	A
Result	W	L	W	W	W	W	L	L	L	L	W	L	L	W	W	W	W	L	W	W	W	L	W	W	L	L	W	W	W	W	L	W	L	L
Position	8	12	6	4	4	4	3	5	8	9	8	10	12	11	8	7	6	10	6	5	5	5	5	4	6	7	7	6	6	4	6	5	6	6

Source: EuroLeague.net
A = Away; H = Home; W = Win; L = Loss

==== Matches ====
Note: All times, from 29 October 2023 to 31 March 2024, are CET (UTC+1); up to 29 October 2023 and from 31 March 2024, are CEST (UTC+2) as listed by EuroLeague.

6 October 2023 1	Fenerbahçe Beko (Turkish Basketball Federation)	85–82(OT)	(Italian Basketball Federation) EA7 Emporio Armani Milan	Istanbul
19:45	Scoring by quarter: 19–23, 19–12, 24–19, 14–22, Overtime: 9–6
	Pts: Wilbekin 19; Rebs: Pierre 6 Asts: Wilbekin 4 PIR: Wilbekin 16	Boxscore	Pts: Mirotić 27; Rebs: Mirotić 11; Asts: Pangos 5 PIR: Mirotić 38	Arena: Ülker Sports and Event Hall; Attendance: 10,211; Referees: Saša Pukl, Carlos Peruga, Uroš Nikolić

13 October 2023 2	Valencia Basket (Spanish Basketball Federation)	77–74	(Turkish Basketball Federation) Fenerbahçe Beko	Valencia
20:30	Scoring by quarter: 22–9, 17–24, 19–20, 19–21
	Pts: Davies 18; Rebs: Ojeleye 7 Asts: Jones 7 PIR: Davies 21	Boxscore	Pts: Dorsey 17; Rebs: Hayes 6 Asts: Dorsey, Madar 3 PIR: Dorsey 17	Arena: Font de Sant Lluís; Attendance: 7,037; Referees: Milivoje Jovčić, Jakub Zamojski, Anne Panther

17 October 2023 3	Fenerbahçe Beko (Turkish Basketball Federation)	83–69	(Hellenic Basketball Federation) Panathinaikos	Istanbul
19:15	Scoring by quarter: 27–9, 16–19, 24–17, 16–24
	Pts: Papagiannis 15; Rebs: Pierre 10; Asts: Calathes, Gudurić 5 PIR: Gudurić 22	Boxscore	Pts: Lessort 19; Rebs: Hernangómez 6 Asts: Grant 3 PIR: Lessort 25	Arena: Ülker Sports and Event Hall; Attendance: 11,115; Referees: Sreten Radović, Carmelo Paternicò, Gentian Cici

19 October 2023 4	Fenerbahçe Beko (Turkish Basketball Federation)	101–86	(French Federation of Basketball) LDLC ASVEL	Istanbul
19:45	Scoring by quarter: 16–28, 26–27, 30–15, 29–16
	Pts: Wilbekin 18; Rebs: Calathes 8 Asts: Calathes 9 PIR: Calathes 20	Boxscore	Pts: Jackson 25; Rebs: Kahudi 8 Asts: Lee, Lauvergne 5 PIR: Jackson 23	Arena: Ülker Sports and Event Hall; Attendance: 7,251; Referees: Matej Boltauzer, Tomasz Trawicki, Alberto Baena

27 October 2023 5	Bayern Munich (German Basketball Federation)	67–76	(Turkish Basketball Federation) Fenerbahçe Beko	Munich
20:30	Scoring by quarter: 20–19, 18–22, 9–14, 20–21
	Pts: Francisco 11; Rebs: Bonga, Ibaka 7 Asts: Francisco 5 PIR: Booker 16	Boxscore	Pts: Wilbekin 17; Rebs: four players 6 Asts: Wilbekin 5 PIR: Wilbekin 23	Arena: BMW Park; Attendance: 6,500; Referees: Oļegs Latiševs, Jordi Aliaga, Nick van den Broeck

2 November 2023 6	Fenerbahçe Beko (Turkish Basketball Federation)	79–77	(Hellenic Basketball Federation) Olympiacos	Istanbul
18:45	Scoring by quarter: 29–14, 17–19, 12–24, 21–20
	Pts: Papagiannis 15; Rebs: Hayes 7 Asts: Calathes 5 PIR: Papagiannis 19	Boxscore	Pts: Peters 19; Rebs: Peters 6 Asts: Papanikolaou, Walkup 5 PIR: Peters 23	Arena: Ülker Sports and Event Hall; Attendance: 10,951; Referees: Fernando Rocha, Uroš Nikolić, Sašo Petek

9 November 2023 7	Partizan Mozzart Bet (Basketball Federation of Serbia)	85–84	(Turkish Basketball Federation) Fenerbahçe Beko	Belgrade
20:30	Scoring by quarter: 23–27, 24–29, 16–13, 22–15
	Pts: Kaminsky 15; Rebs: LeDay 7 Asts: Dozier, LeDay 5 PIR: Smailagić 15	Boxscore	Pts: Hayes 23; Rebs: Hayes, Papagiannis 6 Asts: Dorsey 5 PIR: Hayes 35	Arena: Štark Arena; Attendance: 20,058; Referees: Carlos Peruga, Marcin Kowalski, Thomas Bissuel

14 November 2023 8	Crvena zvezda Meridianbet (Basketball Federation of Serbia)	87–56	(Turkish Basketball Federation) Fenerbahçe Beko	Belgrade
20:45	Scoring by quarter: 25–16, 20–10, 15–14, 27–16
	Pts: Teodosić 18; Rebs: Mitrović 8 Asts: Nedović 5 PIR: Teodosić 21	Boxscore	Pts: Hayes 12; Rebs: Sestina 5 Asts: Madar 3 PIR: Sestina 11	Arena: Aleksandar Nikolić Hall; Attendance: 19,637; Referees: Mehdi Difallah, Milan Nedović, Guido Giovannetti

16 November 2023 9	Maccabi Playtika Tel Aviv (Israeli Basketball Association)	78–73	(Turkish Basketball Federation) Fenerbahçe Beko	Belgrade (Note: From 24 October onwards, Maccabi Playtika Tel Aviv will play their home matches at the Aleksandar Nikolić Hall in Belgrade due to the inability to host matches in Israel as a result of the Gaza war.)
20:05	Scoring by quarter: 21–28, 17–18, 18–11, 22–16
	Pts: Brown 18; Rebs: Colson 14; Asts: Baldwin 5 PIR: Webb 18	Boxscore	Pts: Wilbekin, Biberović 18; Rebs: Hayes, Sestina 6 Asts: Wilbekin 7 PIR: Wilbekin 20	Arena: Aleksandar Nikolić Hall; Attendance: 0 Referees: Ilija Belošević, Joseph Bissang, Uroš Obrknežević

23 November 2023 10	Virtus Segafredo Bologna (Italian Basketball Federation)	87–79	(Turkish Basketball Federation) Fenerbahçe Beko	Bologna
20:30	Scoring by quarter: 25–27, 21–17, 24–14, 17–21
	Pts: Shengelia 15; Rebs: Shengelia 8 Asts: Hackett 6 PIR: Shengelia 21	Boxscore	Pts: Motley 25; Rebs: Motley 8 Asts: Calathes, Gudurić 4 PIR: Motley 31	Arena: Segafredo Arena; Attendance: 6,946; Referees: Juan Carlos García, Milivoje Jovčić, Amit Balak

30 November 2023 11	Fenerbahçe Beko (Turkish Basketball Federation)	100–99(OT)	(Spanish Basketball Federation) Real Madrid	Istanbul
18:45	Scoring by quarter: 16–29, 21–15, 22–23, 28–20, Overtime: 13–12
	Pts: Gudurić 21; Rebs: Hayes, Gudurić 7 Asts: Gudurić 5 PIR: Gudurić 29	Boxscore	Pts: Campazzo 33; Rebs: Deck, Poirier 8 Asts: Campazzo 7 PIR: Campazzo 32	Arena: Ülker Sports and Event Hall; Attendance: 11,787; Referees: Robert Lottermoser, Miloš Koljenšić, Luka Kardum

6 December 2023 12	Baskonia (Spanish Basketball Federation)	80–79	(Turkish Basketball Federation) Fenerbahçe Beko	Vitoria-Gasteiz
20:30	Scoring by quarter: 10–18, 28–19, 19–18, 23–24
	Pts: Howard 28; Rebs: Kotsar 10; Asts: Miller-McIntyre, Moneke 4 PIR: Kotsar 24	Boxscore	Pts: Hayes 19; Rebs: Pierre 5 Asts: Hayes 6 PIR: Hayes 23	Arena: Buesa Arena; Attendance: 10,452; Referees: Fernando Rocha, Joseph Bissang, Igor Dragojević

8 December 2023 13	Barcelona (Spanish Basketball Federation)	89–81	(Turkish Basketball Federation) Fenerbahçe Beko	Barcelona
20:30	Scoring by quarter: 16–19, 22–31, 25–14, 26–17
	Pts: Hernangómez 21; Rebs: Hernangómez 9 Asts: Satoranský 6 PIR: Hernangómez 26	Boxscore	Pts: Hayes 18; Rebs: Pierre 6 Asts: Dorsey 7 PIR: Dorsey 18	Arena: Palau Blaugrana; Attendance: 6,787; Referees: Damir Javor, Milivoje Jovčić, Artūras Šukys

15 December 2023 14	Fenerbahçe Beko (Turkish Basketball Federation)	86–74	(French Federation of Basketball) AS Monaco Basket	Istanbul
18:45	Scoring by quarter: 24–21, 22–24, 22–12, 18–17
	Pts: Hayes 18; Rebs: Calathes 10; Asts: Wilbekin 5 PIR: Hayes 25	Boxscore	Pts: James 24; Rebs: Blossomgame 7 Asts: Okobo 4 PIR: James 25	Arena: Ülker Sports and Event Hall; Attendance: 9,563; Referees: Tomislav Hordov, Gytis Vilius, Michele Rossi

20 December 2023 15	Fenerbahçe Beko (Turkish Basketball Federation)	80–78	(Lithuanian Basketball Federation) Žalgiris	Istanbul
18:30	Scoring by quarter: 22–26, 15–22, 19–14, 24–16
	Pts: Dorsey 19; Rebs: Pierre 8 Asts: Calathes 6 PIR: Dorsey 24	Boxscore	Pts: Evans 19; Rebs: Smits 9 Asts: Ulanovas, Evans 5 PIR: Evans 30	Arena: Ülker Sports and Event Hall; Attendance: 8,114; Referees: Juan Carlos Garcia, Rain Peerandi, Thomas Bissuel

22 December 2023 16	ALBA Berlin (German Basketball Federation)	82–91	(Turkish Basketball Federation) Fenerbahçe Beko	Berlin
20:15	Scoring by quarter: 26–24, 21–27, 12–21, 23–19
	Pts: Brown 15; Rebs: Koumadje, Brown 5 Asts: Delow 4 PIR: Thiemann 14	Boxscore	Pts: Wilbekin 20; Rebs: Motley 6 Asts: Calathes 13; PIR: Wilbekin 22	Arena: Mercedes-Benz Arena; Attendance: 13,112; Referees: Mehdi Difallah, Ioannis Foufis, Amit Balak

28 December 2023 17	Anadolu Efes (Turkish Basketball Federation)	84–89	(Turkish Basketball Federation) Fenerbahçe Beko	Istanbul
18:30	Scoring by quarter: 29–29, 23–18, 16–22, 16–20
	Pts: Larkin 28; Rebs: Oturu 7 Asts: Larkin 5 PIR: Larkin 37	Boxscore	Pts: Hayes 24; Rebs: Hayes 6 Asts: Calathes 8 PIR: Hayes 27	Arena: Sinan Erdem Dome; Attendance: 15,041; Referees: Sreten Radovic, Uros Nikolic, Saso Petek

2 January 2024 18	Fenerbahçe Beko (Turkish Basketball Federation)	76–85	(Basketball Federation of Serbia) Crvena zvezda Meridianbet	Istanbul
18:45	Scoring by quarter: 26–18, 9–16, 22–23, 19–28
	Pts: Hayes 21; Rebs: Hayes 9 Asts: Wilbekin 4 PIR: Hayes 28	Boxscore	Pts: Bolomboy 24; Rebs: Giedraitis 7 Asts: Teodosić 8 PIR: Bolomboy 31	Arena: Ülker Sports and Event Hall; Attendance: 8,153; Referees: Jakub Zamojski, Maxime Boubert, Igor Dragojević

4 January 2024 19	Fenerbahçe Beko (Turkish Basketball Federation)	109–74	(Israeli Basketball Association) Maccabi Playtika Tel Aviv	Panevėžys (Note: The Turkish Airlines EuroLeague Regular Season Round 19 game between Fenerbahce Beko Istanbul and Maccabi Playtika Tel Aviv, scheduled for January 4, will be played at Kalnapilio Arena in Panevezys, Lithuania, instead of Istanbul as originally scheduled. This decision has been taken considering Turkish and Israel government recommendations.)
18:45	Scoring by quarter: 22–22, 35–9, 23–17, 29–26
	Pts: Dorsey 21; Rebs: Papagiannis 6 Asts: Calathes 7 PIR: Dorsey 21	Boxscore	Pts: Baldwin, Colson 13; Rebs: Colson 6 Asts: Brown 6 PIR: Colson 16	Arena: Kalnapilio Arena; Attendance: 2,938; Referees: Robert Lottermoser, Gytis Vilius, Marcin Kowalski

9 January 2024 20	Fenerbahçe Beko (Turkish Basketball Federation)	91–76	(Basketball Federation of Serbia) Partizan Mozzart Bet	Istanbul
18:30	Scoring by quarter: 19–31, 24–17, 25–16, 23–12
	Pts: Dorsey 24; Rebs: Hayes 7 Asts: Calathes 7 PIR: Dorsey 23	Boxscore	Pts: Punter 18; Rebs: Leday 6 Asts: Dozier 6 PIR: Caboclo, Punter 14	Arena: Ülker Sports and Event Hall; Attendance: 9,374; Referees: Mehdi Difallah, Milan Nedovic, Jordi Aliaga

11 January 2024 21	Fenerbahçe Beko (Turkish Basketball Federation)	98–91(OT)	(German Basketball Federation) Bayern Munich	Istanbul
18:45	Scoring by quarter: 22–22, 16–17, 19–20, 24–22, Overtime: 17–10
	Pts: Wilbekin 30; Rebs: Pierre 10; Asts: Calathes 6 PIR: Pierre 29	Boxscore	Pts: Francisco 21; Rebs: Lučić, Weiler-Babb 6 Asts: Bolmaro 6 PIR: Francisco 27	Arena: Ülker Sports and Event Hall; Attendance: 9,622; Referees: Juan Carlos García, Carlos Peruga, Eduard Udyanskyy

19 January 2024 22	Žalgiris (Lithuanian Basketball Federation)	98–75	(Turkish Basketball Federation) Fenerbahçe Beko	Kaunas
19:00	Scoring by quarter: 20–14, 23–21, 23–20, 32–20
	Pts: Evans 21; Rebs: Birutis 10; Asts: Evans 7 PIR: Birutis 28	Boxscore	Pts: Wilbekin 22; Rebs: Şanlı, Pierre 6 Asts: Wilbekin 6 PIR: Wilbekin 23	Arena: Žalgiris Arena; Attendance: 15,105; Referees: Ilija Belošević, Joseph Bissang, Thomas Bissuel

25 January 2024 23	Fenerbahçe Beko (Turkish Basketball Federation)	88–75	(Italian Basketball Federation) Virtus Segafredo Bologna	Istanbul
18:45	Scoring by quarter: 21–25, 31–22, 19–9, 17–19
	Pts: Motley 23; Rebs: Motley 11; Asts: Wilbekin 6 PIR: Motley 29	Boxscore	Pts: Lundberg 17; Rebs: Zizic 6 Asts: Cordinier 4 PIR: Cordinier 21	Arena: Ülker Sports and Event Hall; Attendance: 11,814; Referees: Matej Boltauzer, Olegs Latisevs, Steve Bittner

30 January 2024 24	LDLC ASVEL (French Federation of Basketball)	73–83	(Turkish Basketball Federation) Fenerbahçe Beko	Villeurbanne, Lyon
20:00	Scoring by quarter: 18–16, 24–23, 14–28, 17–16
	Pts: Scott 26; Rebs: Fall 11; Asts: Lee, Jackson 4 PIR: Scott 23	Boxscore	Pts: Motley 24; Rebs: Noua 7 Asts: Calathes 8 PIR: Motley 24	Arena: LDLC Arena; Attendance: 8,722; Referees: Juan Carlos Garcia, Milan Nedovic, Marcin Kowalski

2 February 2024 25	AS Monaco Basket (French Federation of Basketball)	76–69	(Turkish Basketball Federation) Fenerbahçe Beko	Fontvieille, Monaco
20:30	Scoring by quarter: 21–15, 15–19, 19–17, 21–8
	Pts: James 23; Rebs: Hall 5 Asts: James 6 PIR: James 29	Boxscore	Pts: Şanlı 12; Rebs: Motley 7 Asts: Wilbekin 5 PIR: Motley 14	Arena: Salle Gaston Médecin; Attendance: 4,654; Referees: Damir Javor, Ioannis Foufis, Amit Balak

9 February 2024 26	Panathinaikos (Hellenic Basketball Federation)	74–63	(Turkish Basketball Federation) Fenerbahçe Beko	Marousi, Athens
20:15	Scoring by quarter: 13–21, 25–9, 19–17, 17–16
	Pts: Nunn 23; Rebs: Lessort, Hernangómez 8 Asts: Kalaitzakis, Grant 2 PIR: Lessort 23	Boxscore	Pts: Motley 16; Rebs: Motley, Wilbekin 5 Asts: Calathes 5 PIR: Motley 29	Arena: O.A.K.A. Attendance: 17,729; Referees: Miguel Angel Perez, Milos Koljensic, Luka Kardum

1 March 2024 27	Fenerbahçe Beko (Turkish Basketball Federation)	111–96	(Spanish Basketball Federation) Baskonia	Istanbul
18:45	Scoring by quarter: 32–34, 23–20, 23–24, 33–18
	Pts: Hayes 19; Rebs: Motley 5 Asts: Calathes 12; PIR: Calathes 25	Boxscore	Pts: Marinković 18; Rebs: Díez 6 Asts: Miller-McIntyre 10; PIR: Díez 23	Arena: Ülker Sports and Event Hall; Attendance: 10,730; Referees: Robert Lottermoser, Tomislav Hordov, Arturas Sukys

7 March 2024 28	Real Madrid (Spanish Basketball Federation)	79–89	(Turkish Basketball Federation) Fenerbahçe Beko	Madrid
20:45	Scoring by quarter: 15–20, 18–23, 25–24, 21–22
	Pts: Llull 17; Rebs: Tavares, Yabusele 6 Asts: Campazzo 5 PIR: Musa 20	Boxscore	Pts: Hayes 17; Rebs: Hayes 12; Asts: Calathes 6 PIR: Hayes 26	Arena: WiZink Center; Attendance: 10,127; Referees: Damir Javor, Mehdi Difallah, Milivoje Jovcic

14 March 2024 29	Fenerbahçe Beko (Turkish Basketball Federation)	118–88	(Spanish Basketball Federation) Valencia Basket	Istanbul
18:45	Scoring by quarter: 22–19, 35–18, 28–24, 33–27
	Pts: Dorsey 28; Rebs: Biberovic 6 Asts: Calathes 9 PIR: Dorsey 23	Boxscore	Pts: Davies 18; Rebs: Davies 5 Asts: Harper, Jovic 4 PIR: Davies 29	Arena: Ülker Sports and Event Hall; Attendance: 8,107; Referees: Ilija Belošević, Ioannis Foufis, Aare Halliko

20 March 2024 30	Fenerbahçe Beko (Turkish Basketball Federation)	88–74	(Spanish Basketball Federation) Barcelona	Istanbul
18:45	Scoring by quarter: 23–11, 23–14, 16–32, 26–17
	Pts: Wilbekin 18; Rebs: Motley 6 Asts: Guduric 4 PIR: Nigel Hayes 26	Boxscore	Pts: Brizuela 18; Rebs: da Silva 7 Asts: Laprovittola 4 PIR: Hernangomez 14	Arena: Ülker Sports and Event Hall; Attendance: 12,960; Referees: Matej Boltauzer, Joseph Bissang, Luka Kardum

22 March 2024 31	EA7 Emporio Armani Milan (Italian Basketball Federation)	77–76	(Turkish Basketball Federation) Fenerbahçe Beko	Milan
20:30	Scoring by quarter: 28–18, 15–18, 16–15, 18–25
	Pts: Melli 17; Rebs: Mirotić 7 Asts: Shields 5 PIR: Shields 23	Boxscore	Pts: Wilbekin 15; Rebs: Gudurić 5 Asts: Gudurić, Calathes 6 PIR: Gudurić 19	Arena: Mediolanum Forum; Attendance: 11,214; Referees: Carlos Peruga, Milan Nedović, Maxime Boubert

29 March 2024 32	Fenerbahçe Beko (Turkish Basketball Federation)	103–68	(German Basketball Federation) ALBA Berlin	Istanbul
18:45	Scoring by quarter: 34–18, 18–22, 31–13, 20–15
	Pts: Hayes 50; Rebs: Motley 5 Asts: Calathes 7 PIR: Hayes 46	Boxscore	Pts: Brown 17; Rebs: Bean 7 Asts: Samar 3 PIR: Brown 17	Arena: Ülker Sports and Event Hall; Attendance: 10,781; Referees: Milivoje Jovcic, Gytis Vilius, Eduard Udyanskyy

5 April 2024 33	Fenerbahçe Beko (Turkish Basketball Federation)	80–82	(Turkish Basketball Federation) Anadolu Efes	Istanbul
19:45	Scoring by quarter: 13–16, 23–16, 16–19, 28–31
	Pts: Wilbekin 17; Rebs: Hayes-Davis, Papagiannis 8 Asts: Calathes, Wilbekin 3 PIR: Gudurić, Papagiannis 15	Boxscore	Pts: Clyburn 21; Rebs: Clyburn 5 Asts: Larkin 5 PIR: Clyburn 28	Arena: Ülker Sports and Event Hall; Attendance: 12,417; Referees: Ilija Belosevic Jordi Aliaga Arturas Sukys

12 April 2024 34	Olympiacos (Hellenic Basketball Federation)	84–81(OT)	(Turkish Basketball Federation) Fenerbahçe Beko	Piraeus
20:15	Scoring by quarter: 19–19, 19–15, 15–18, 16–17, Overtime: 15–12
	Pts: Canaan 27; Rebs: Fall, Papanikolaou 6 Asts: Walkup 6 PIR: Canaan 26	Boxscore	Pts: Hayes-Davis 21; Rebs: Calathes 8 Asts: Calathes 7 PIR: Hayes-Davis 17	Arena: Peace and Friendship Stadium; Attendance: 12,239; Referees: Matej Boltauzer, Tomislav Hordov, Oļegs Latiševs

=== EuroLeague Playoffs ===
==== Quarterfinals ====
Win Loss

24 April 2024 1	AS Monaco Basket (French Federation of Basketball)	91–95(OT) (Series: 0–1)	(Turkish Basketball Federation) Fenerbahçe Beko	Fontvieille, Monaco
19:00	Scoring by quarter: 26–15, 20–22, 15–23, 20–21, Overtime: 10–14
	Pts: Okobo 19; Rebs: Blossomgame 9 Asts: James, Okobo 4 PIR: three players 17	Boxscore	Pts: Hayes-Davis 19; Rebs: Dorsey, Hayes-Davis 7 Asts: Dorsey, Gudurić 5 PIR: Hayes-Davis 23	Arena: Salle Gaston Médecin; Attendance: 4,777; Referees: Miguel Angel Perez, Piotr Pastusiak, Arturas Sukys

26 April 2024 2	AS Monaco Basket (French Federation of Basketball)	93–88 (Series: 1–1)	(Turkish Basketball Federation) Fenerbahçe Beko	Fontvieille, Monaco
19:00	Scoring by quarter: 31–21, 23–29, 11–24, 28–14
	Pts: Motiejūnas 18; Rebs: James 7 Asts: James 7 PIR: Motiejūnas 21	Boxscore	Pts: Dorsey 25; Rebs: Hayes-Davis, Papagiannis 6 Asts: Calathes 7 PIR: Dorsey 20	Arena: Salle Gaston Médecin; Attendance: 4,891; Referees: Robert Lottermoser, Gytis Vilius, Jordi Aliaga

1 May 2024 3	Fenerbahçe Beko (Turkish Basketball Federation)	89–78 (Series: 2–1)	(French Federation of Basketball) AS Monaco Basket	Istanbul
19:45	Scoring by quarter: 19–21, 28–19, 22–18, 20–20
	Pts: Biberović 14; Rebs: Papagiannis 6 Asts: Gudurić 6 PIR: Calathes 18	Boxscore	Pts: Diallo 23; Rebs: Diallo 7 Asts: James 7 PIR: Diallo 28	Arena: Ülker Sports and Event Hall; Attendance: 12,780; Referees: Fernando Rocha, Damir Javor, Emilio Pérez

3 May 2024 4	Fenerbahçe Beko (Turkish Basketball Federation)	62–65 (Series: 2–2)	(French Federation of Basketball) AS Monaco Basket	Istanbul
19:45	Scoring by quarter: 15–11, 18–19, 14–18, 15–17
	Pts: Gudurić 14; Rebs: Papagiannis 11; Asts: Calathes 5 PIR: Papagiannis 20	Boxscore	Pts: Okobo 13; Rebs: Hall 7 Asts: James, Loyd 3 PIR: Hall 13	Arena: Ülker Sports and Event Hall; Attendance: 12,817; Referees: Miguel Angel Perez, Carlos Peruga, Uros Nikolic

8 May 2024 5	AS Monaco (French Federation of Basketball)	79–80(OT) (Series: 2–3)	(Turkish Basketball Federation) Fenerbahçe Beko	Fontvieille
19:00	Scoring by quarter: 15–13, 25–22, 15–21, 15–14, Overtime: 9–10
	Pts: James 20; Rebs: Motiejūnas 7 Asts: Okobo 5 PIR: James 20	Boxscore	Pts: Calathes, Wilbekin 14; Rebs: Calathes 6 Asts: Calathes, Hayes-Davis 4 PIR: Biberović 17	Arena: Salle Gaston Médecin; Attendance: 5,000; Referees: Fernando Rocha, Carlos Peruga, Emilio Pérez

=== Final Four ===
==== Semifinal ====
24 May 2024	Panathinaikos AKTOR (Hellenic Basketball Federation)	73–57	(Turkish Basketball Federation) Fenerbahçe Beko	Berlin, Germany
18:00 (CEST)	Scoring by quarter: 22–13, 16–23, 18–14, 17–7
	Pts: Lessort 17; Rebs: Lessort 10; Asts: three players 3 PIR: Lessort 20	Boxscore	Pts: Hayes-Davis 14; Rebs: Calathes 9 Asts: Calathes 4 PIR: Hayes-Davis 18	Arena: Uber Arena; Referees: Ilija Belošević, Carlos Peruga, Mehdi Difallah

==== Third place game ====
26 May 2024	Olympiacos (Hellenic Basketball Federation)	87–84	(Turkish Basketball Federation) Fenerbahçe Beko	Berlin, Germany
17:00 (CEST)	Scoring by quarter: 24–16, 24–21, 18–25, 21–22
	Pts: Peters 20; Rebs: Milutinov 8 Asts: Williams-Goss 6 PIR: Peters 21	Boxscore	Pts: Pierre 19; Rebs: Pierre 5 Asts: Wilbekin 5 PIR: Wilbekin 24	Arena: Uber Arena; Referees: Sreten Radović, Carlos Peruga, Uroš Nikolić

=== Turkish Basketball Cup ===
==== Quarterfinals ====
Win Loss

14 February 2024 QF	Petkim Spor	68–81	Fenerbahçe Beko	Aliağa, İzmir
20:30	Scoring by quarter: 22–21, 10–18, 19–23, 17–19
TRT Spor	Pts: Efianayi 24; Rebs: Agva 6 Asts: Efianayi 7 PIR: Efianayi 22	Boxscore	Pts: Biberović 22; Rebs: Biberović 7 Asts: Calathes 6 PIR: Biberović 27	Arena: Enka Sport Hall; Referees: Kerem Baki, Alper Altuğ Köselerli, Nazlı Çisil Güngör

==== Semifinals ====
Win Loss

16 February 2024 SF	Fenerbahçe Beko	99–68	Beşiktaş Emlakjet	Konya
21:00	Scoring by quarter: 32–8, 29–20, 18–18, 20–22
TRT Spor	Pts: Motley 23; Rebs: Şanlı 7 Asts: Calathes 7 PIR: Motley 25	Boxscore	Pts: Simonović 19; Rebs: Delgado 8 Asts: Mathews, Needham 4 PIR: Simonović 24	Arena: Karatay Spor ve Kongre Merkezi; Referees: Kaan Büyükçil, Ali Şakacı, Hüseyin Çelik

==== Final ====
Win Loss

18 February 2024 F	Anadolu Efes	67–80	Fenerbahçe Beko	Konya
15:30	Scoring by quarter: 20–26, 15–16, 14–21, 18–17
TRT Spor	Pts: Larkin 17; Rebs: Clyburn 7 Asts: Larkin 6 PIR: Larkin 21	Boxscore	Pts: Wilbekin 18; Rebs: Calathes 11; Asts: Calathes 7 PIR: Calathes 21	Arena: Karatay Spor ve Kongre Merkezi; Referees: Emin Moğulkoç, Yener Yılmaz, Mehmet Karabilecen

== Statistics ==
Legend
GP	Games played	GS	Games started	MPG	Minutes per game
FG%	Field-goal percentage	3FG%	3-point field-goal percentage	FT%	Free-throw percentage
RPG	Rebounds per game	APG	Assists per game	SPG	Steals per game
BPG	Blocks per game	PPG	Points per game	PIR	PIR per game

Player	Left during season

=== EuroLeague ===
Player	GP	GS	MPG	2FG%	3FG%	FT%	RPG	APG	SPG	BPG	PPG	PIR
Tarik Biberovic	31	6	16:13	.508	.531	.920	2.2	0.7	0.3	0	7.0	5.6
Nick Calathes	38	35	23:42	.523	.357	.513	4.2	4.8	1.1	0.2	7.1	10.5
Tyler Dorsey	38	16	17:36	.427	.454	.831	1.8	1.2	0.2	0.1	8.7	7.5
Marko Gudurić	37	9	21:28	.583	.336	.901	2.5	2.5	0.8	0	9.1	9.6
Nigel Hayes	37	36	31:30	.562	.372	.832	4.6	1.7	1.0	0.2	13.8	15.6
Şehmus Hazer	6	0	5:40	.000	.000	.500	0.7	0.2	0	0	0.3	0
Yam Madar	30	4	13:31	.556	.325	.829	1.2	2.0	0.6	0.1	4.3	4.8
Melih Mahmutoğlu	9	0	4:32	.333	.333	.000	0.1	0.1	0.1	0	1.6	0.7
Yiğit Hamza Mestoğlu	1	0	2:25	.000	.000	.000	0	0	0	0	0	0
Johnathan Motley	36	19	18:43	.655	.250	.709	4.2	1.1	0.2	0.2	11.2	12.2
Amine Noua	12	7	14:42	.667	.375	.800	2.8	0.5	0.2	0.8	4.2	5.3
Georgios Papagiannis	38	11	15:58	.667	.488	.667	3.1	0.8	0.3	0.8	5.7	7.2
Dyshawn Pierre	27	24	19:47	.541	.302	.917	3.9	1.0	0.6	0.1	5.6	8.0
Sertaç Şanlı	35	16	12:13	.531	.351	.783	2.0	0.5	0.1	0.3	4.7	3.3
Nate Sestina	35	4	11:29	.618	.385	.588	1.5	0.4	0.3	0.2	3.6	2.9
Scottie Wilbekin	41	18	24:40	.426	.401	.875	2.2	3.3	1.1	0	13.0	12.5
TOTAL	—			.556	.392	.793	33.3	18.1	5.9	2.2	84.1	92.2

Source: EuroLeague
