= 2024 Turkish Basketball Cup =

- Season: 2023–24
- Duration: 13–18 February 2024
- Games played: 7
- Teams: 8
- TV partner: TRT Spor

Finals
- Champions: Fenerbahçe Beko (8th title)
- Runners-up: Anadolu Efes

Awards
- Final MVP: (Greece) Nick Calathes

The 2024 Turkish Basketball Cup (Turkish: 2024 Basketbol Erkekler Türkiye Kupası), also known as ING Erkekler Türkiye Kupası for sponsorship reasons, was the 37th edition of Turkey's top-tier level professional national domestic basketball cup competition. The quarterfinals of tournament were hold from 13 to 14 February 2024 in 4 different locations, followed by the semi-finals and the final held from 16 to 18 February 2024 at the Karatay Spor ve Kongre Merkezi in Konya, Turkey.

== Qualified teams ==
The top eight placed teams after the first half of the top-tier level Basketball Super League 2023–24 season qualified for the tournament. The four highest-placed teams played against the lowest-seeded teams in the quarter-finals. The competition was played under a single elimination format.

Pos	Team	Pld	W	L	PF	PA	PD	Pts	Seeding
1	Anadolu Efes	15	13	2	1294	1181	+113	28	Seeded
2	Fenerbahçe Beko	15	12	3	1334	1083	+251	27	Seeded
3	Beşiktaş Emlakjet	15	11	4	1172	1099	+73	26	Seeded
4	Pınar Karşıyaka	15	10	5	1340	1251	+89	25	Seeded
5	Petkim Spor	15	8	7	1273	1211	+62	23	Unseeded
6	Manisa BB	15	8	7	1238	1255	−17	23	Unseeded
7	Galatasaray Ekmas	15	7	8	1201	1184	+17	22	Unseeded
8	Bahçeşehir Koleji	15	7	8	1348	1333	+15	22	Unseeded

Source: Basketbol Süper Ligi

== Draw ==
The 2024 Turkish Basketball Cup was drawn on 15 January 2024. The seeded teams were paired in the quarterfinals with the non-seeded teams.

== Bracket ==
Quarterfinals; February 13–14
1	Anadolu Efes	94
6	Manisa BB	85
4	Pınar Karşıyaka	88
7	Galatasaray Ekmas	72
2	Fenerbahçe Beko	81
5	Petkim Spor	68
3	Beşiktaş Emlakjet	96
8	Bahçeşehir Koleji	81

Semifinals; February 16
1	Anadolu Efes	81
4	Pınar Karşıyaka	77
2	Fenerbahçe Beko	99
3	Beşiktaş Emlakjet	68

Final; February 18
1	Anadolu Efes	67
2	Fenerbahçe Beko	80

== Quarterfinals ==
13 February 2024	Anadolu Efes	94–85	Manisa BB	Ataköy, Istanbul
18:00 TRT (UTC +3)	Scoring by quarter: 18–27, 33–20, 21–21, 22–17
TRT Spor	Pts: Larkin 23; Rebs: Clyburn 7 Asts: Larkin 10; PIR: Larkin 30	Boxscore	Pts: Terry 23; Rebs: Terry 13; Asts: Cruz 7 PIR: Terry 34	Arena: Sinan Erdem Dome; Referees: Mehmet Şahin, Mehmet Serdar Ünal, Burak Yılmaz

13 February 2024	Pınar Karşıyaka	88–72	Galatasaray Ekmas	Karşıyaka, İzmir
20:30 TRT (UTC +3)	Scoring by quarter: 23–14, 22–23, 29–19, 14–16
TRT Spor	Pts: V.Brown 25; Rebs: Carey 12; Asts: McCollum 8 PIR: Carey 28	Boxscore	Pts: Prepelič 19; Rebs: Geyik 8 Asts: Prepelič 7 PIR: Prepelič 17	Arena: Karşıyaka Arena; Referees: Can Mavisu, Ziya Özorhon, Batuhan Söylemezoğlu

14 February 2024	Beşiktaş Emlakjet	96–81	Bahçeşehir Koleji	Istanbul
18:00 TRT (UTC +3)	Scoring by quarter: 28–20, 14–20, 25–21, 29–20
TRT Spor	Pts: Needham, Simonović 15; Rebs: Delgado 8 Asts: Mathews 6 PIR: Simonović 21	Boxscore	Pts: Cavanaugh 19; Rebs: Boutsiele 6 Asts: Scrubb 8 PIR: Cavanaugh 20	Arena: Akatlar Arena; Referees: Ali Serkan Emlek, Özlem Yalman, Ayşe Nur Yazıcıoğlu

14 February 2024	Petkim Spor	68–81	Fenerbahçe Beko	Aliağa, İzmir
20:30 TRT (UTC +3)	Scoring by quarter: 22–21, 10–18, 19–23, 17–19
TRT Spor	Pts: Efianayi 24; Rebs: Agva 6 Asts: Efianayi 7 PIR: Efianayi 22	Boxscore	Pts: Biberović 22; Rebs: Biberović 7 Asts: Calathes 6 PIR: Biberović 27	Arena: Enka Sport Hall; Referees: Kerem Baki, Alper Altuğ Köselerli, Nazlı Çisil Güngör

== Semifinals ==
16 February 2024	Anadolu Efes	81–77	Pınar Karşıyaka	Konya
18:00 TRT (UTC +3)	Scoring by quarter: 23–16, 13–14, 21–26, 24–21
TRT Spor	Pts: Larkin 23; Rebs: Pleiß 10; Asts: Clyburn, Larkin 5 PIR: Larkin 27	Boxscore	Pts: McCollum 20; Rebs: Carey 11; Asts: McCollum 8 PIR: Carey 26	Arena: Karatay Spor ve Kongre Merkezi; Referees: Fatih Arslanoğlu, Alper Özgök, Musa Kazım Çetin

16 February 2024	Fenerbahçe Beko	99–68	Beşiktaş Emlakjet	Konya
21:00 TRT (UTC +3)	Scoring by quarter: 32–8, 29–20, 18–18, 20–22
TRT Spor	Pts: Motley 23; Rebs: Şanlı 7 Asts: Calathes 7 PIR: Motley 25	Boxscore	Pts: Simonović 19; Rebs: Delgado 8 Asts: Mathews, Needham 4 PIR: Simonović 24	Arena: Karatay Spor ve Kongre Merkezi; Referees: Kaan Büyükçil, Ali Şakacı, Hüseyin Çelik

== Final ==
18 February 2024	Anadolu Efes	67–80	Fenerbahçe Beko	Konya
15:30 TRT (UTC +3)	Scoring by quarter: 20–26, 15–16, 14–21, 18–17
TRT Spor	Pts: Larkin 17; Rebs: Clyburn 7 Asts: Larkin 6 PIR: Larkin 21	Boxscore	Pts: Wilbekin 18; Rebs: Calathes 11; Asts: Calathes 7 PIR: Calathes 21	Arena: Karatay Spor ve Kongre Merkezi; Referees: Emin Moğulkoç, Yener Yılmaz, Mehmet Karabilecen

Starters:			Pts	Reb	Ast
PG	0	(United States) Shane Larkin	17	5	6
SG	6	(United States) Elijah Bryant	15	6	1
SF	11	(Turkey) Erten Gazi	2	2	0
PF	24	(Albania) Ercan Osmani	7	1	0
C	21	(Germany) Tibor Pleiß	2	3	1
Reserves:					
C	8	(Turkey) Salih Altuntaş	DNP		
PG	9	(Turkey) Melih Tunca	DNP		
PG	10	(Turkey) Rıdvan Öncel	0	0	0
SF	12	(United States) Will Clyburn	16	7	1
PG	13	(United States) Darius Thompson	10	2	2
F	19	(Turkey) Burak Can Yıldızlı	DNP		
SF	33	(Turkey) Erkan Yılmaz	3	4	1
Head coach:
(Croatia) Tomislav Mijatović

Anadolu Efes	Fenerbahçe

A. Efes	Statistics	Fenerbahçe
18/38 (47.4%)	2-point field goals	15/30 (50.0%)
9/22 (40.9%)	3-point field goals	14/39 (35.9%)
16/26 (61.5%)	Free throws	8/9 (88.9%)
8	Offensive rebounds	16
25	Defensive rebounds	24
33	Total rebounds	40
12	Assists	21
4	Steals	6
15	Turnovers	9
1	Blocks	1

Starters:			Pts	Reb	Ast
PG	33	(Greece) Nick Calathes	10	11	7
SG	15	(Turkey) Mert Emre Ekşioğlu	4	0	1
SF	10	(Turkey) Melih Mahmutoğlu	3	1	0
PF	11	(United States) Nigel Hayes	12	4	2
C	5	(Turkey) Sertaç Şanlı	0	1	0
Reserves:					
F/C	0	(United States) Johnathan Motley	15	3	0
G	2	(Turkey) Şehmus Hazer	3	3	2
G	3	(United States) Scottie Wilbekin	18	6	4
SF	13	(Turkey) Tarik Biberovic	8	2	0
G/F	23	(Serbia) Marko Gudurić	7	4	5
Head coach:
(Lithuania) Šarūnas Jasikevičius

2024 Turkish Cup Winners
Fenerbahçe Beko
(8th title)

== See also ==
- 2023–24 Basketbol Süper Ligi
