= Şehmus Hazer =

Turkish professional basketball player of Kurdish descent

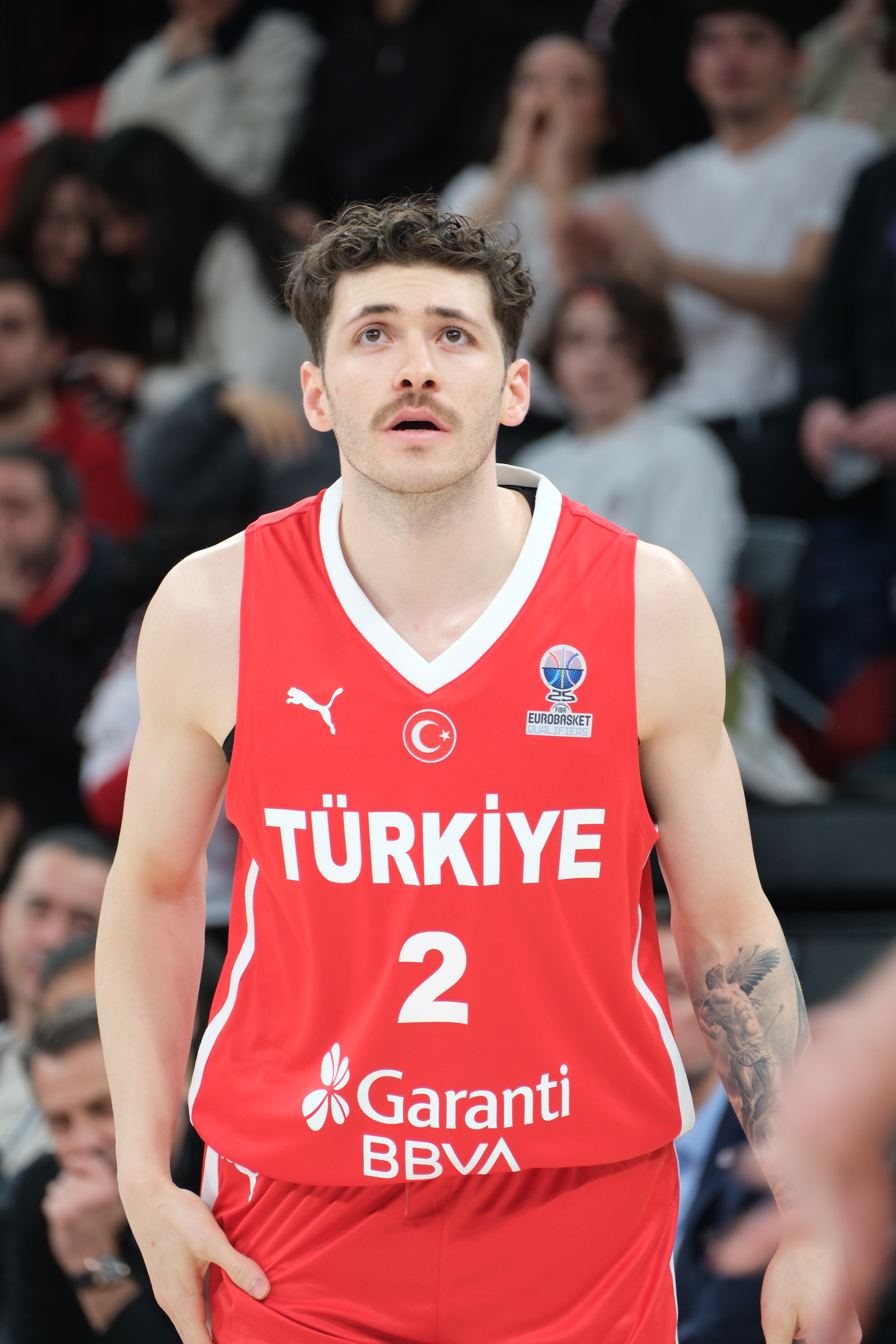
- Hazer with the Turkey national team in 2025

No. 2 – Galatasaray
- Position: Point guard / shooting guard
- League: Basketbol Süper Ligi

Personal information
- Born: February 15, 1999 (age 27) Batman, Turkey
- Listed height: 6 ft 3 in (1.91 m)
- Listed weight: 198 lb (90 kg)

Career information
- NBA draft: 2021: undrafted
- Playing career: 2017–present

Career history
- 2015–2017: Bandırma Kırmızı
- 2017–2020: Bandırma B.İ.K.
- 2020–2021: Beşiktaş
- 2021–2024: Fenerbahçe
- 2024–2025: Bahçeşehir Koleji
- 2025–2026: Anadolu Efes
- 2026–present: Galatasaray

Career highlights
- 2x Turkish League champion (2022, 2024); Turkish Cup winner (2024)
Medals
Men's basketball
Representing Turkey
EuroBasket
Silver medal – second place	2025 Cyprus–Finland–Poland–Latvia

Şehmus Hazer (born February 15, 1999) is a Turkish professional basketball player for Galatasaray of the Turkish Basketbol Süper Ligi (BSL) and the Basketball Champions League.

== Professional career ==
On August 6, 2020, Hazer joined Beşiktaş on a three-year contract. He had a productive season with Beşiktaş, as he averaged 14.9 points per game in Turkish Basketball Super League.

In August 2021, Hazer joined the Cleveland Cavaliers for the NBA Summer League.

On 12 September 2021, Hazer signed a three-year contract with EuroLeague powerhouse Fenerbahçe Beko beginning from the 2021–2022 season. On July 1, 2024, he parted ways with the club and then joined the Sacramento Kings for NBA Summer League.

On July 12, 2024, he signed with Bahçeşehir Koleji of the Basketbol Süper Ligi (BSL).

On July 19, 2025, Hazer signed a two-year (1+1) deal with Anadolu Efes of the Basketbol Süper Ligi (BSL).

On July 7, 2026, he signed with Galatasaray of the Basketbol Süper Ligi (BSL).

== Career statistics ==
Legend
GP	Games played	GS	Games started	MPG	Minutes per game
FG%	Field-goal percentage	3P%	3-point field-goal percentage	FT%	Free-throw percentage
RPG	Rebounds per game	APG	Assists per game	SPG	Steals per game
BPG	Blocks per game	PPG	Points per game	PIR	Performance index rating
**Bold**	Career high

=== EuroLeague ===
Year	Team	GP	GS	MPG	FG%	3P%	FT%	RPG	APG	SPG	BPG	PPG	PIR
2021–22	Fenerbahçe	**25**	**5**	**12.4**	.478	.317	**.643**	**1.1**	**1.1**	**.8**	—	**4.8**	**3.4**
2022–23	Fenerbahçe	17	0	5.8	**.667**	**.600**	.571	.8	.5	.4	—	2.5	2.5
2023–24	Fenerbahçe	6	0	5.7	.000	.000	.500	.7	.2	—	—	0.3	0.0
Career		48	5	9.2	.504	.340	.615	.9	.8	.6	—	3.4	2.7

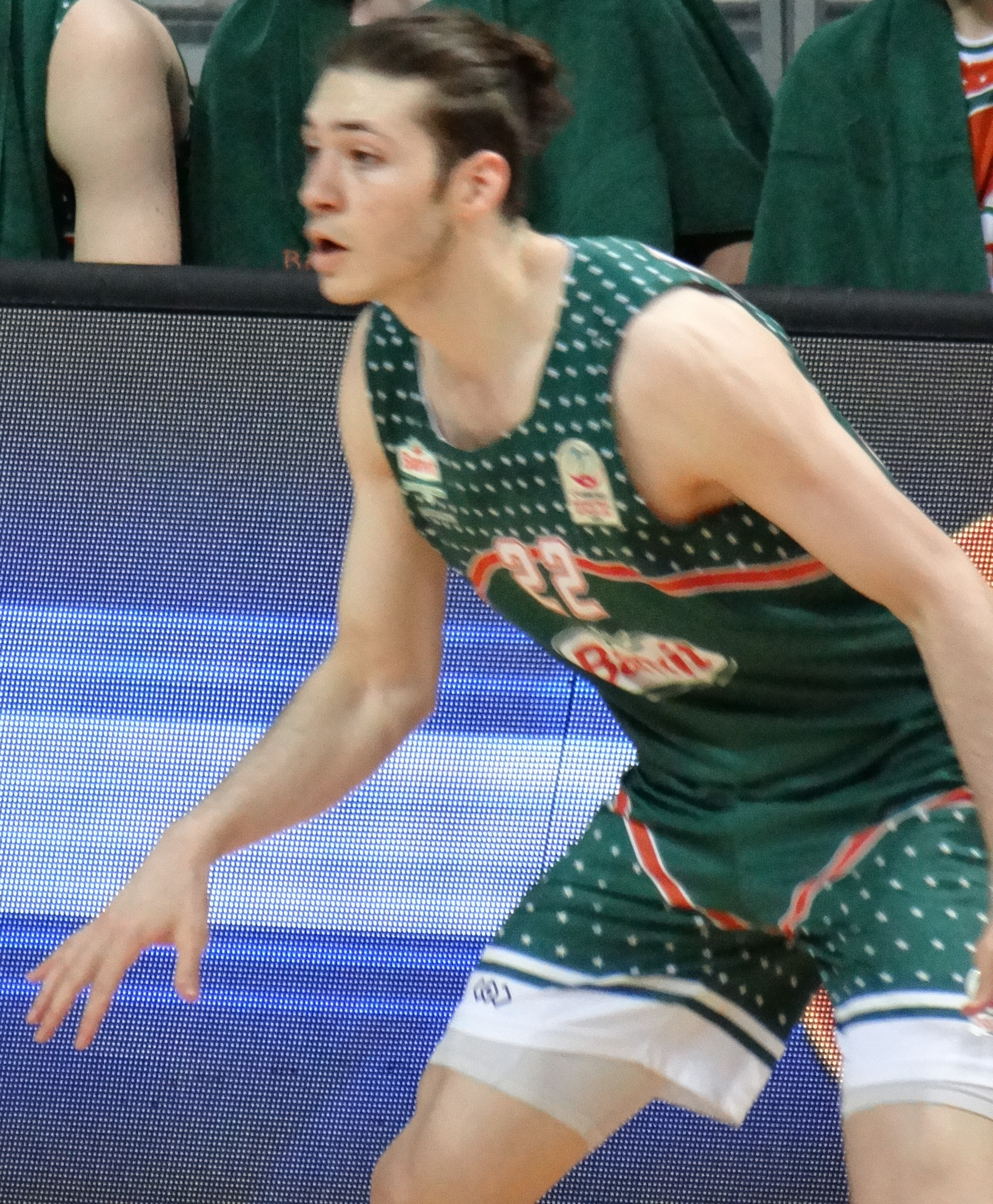
Hazer with Banvit in 2019

=== Basketball Champions League ===
Year	Team	GP	GS	MPG	FG%	3P%	FT%	RPG	APG	SPG	BPG	PPG
2017–18	Banvit B.K.	6	0	11.0	.500	**.400**	**.750**	1.3	.3	.5	—	4.2
2018–19	Banvit B.K.	10	1	18.8	.459	.250	.517	**2.3**	1.4	.9	.1	7.5
2019–20	Bandırma B.İ.K.	**16**	**15**	**22.6**	**.466**	.386	.625	2.2	**2.2**	**1.5**	**.2**	**9.9**
Career		32	16	19.2	.467	.359	.579	2.1	1.6	1.1	.1	8.1

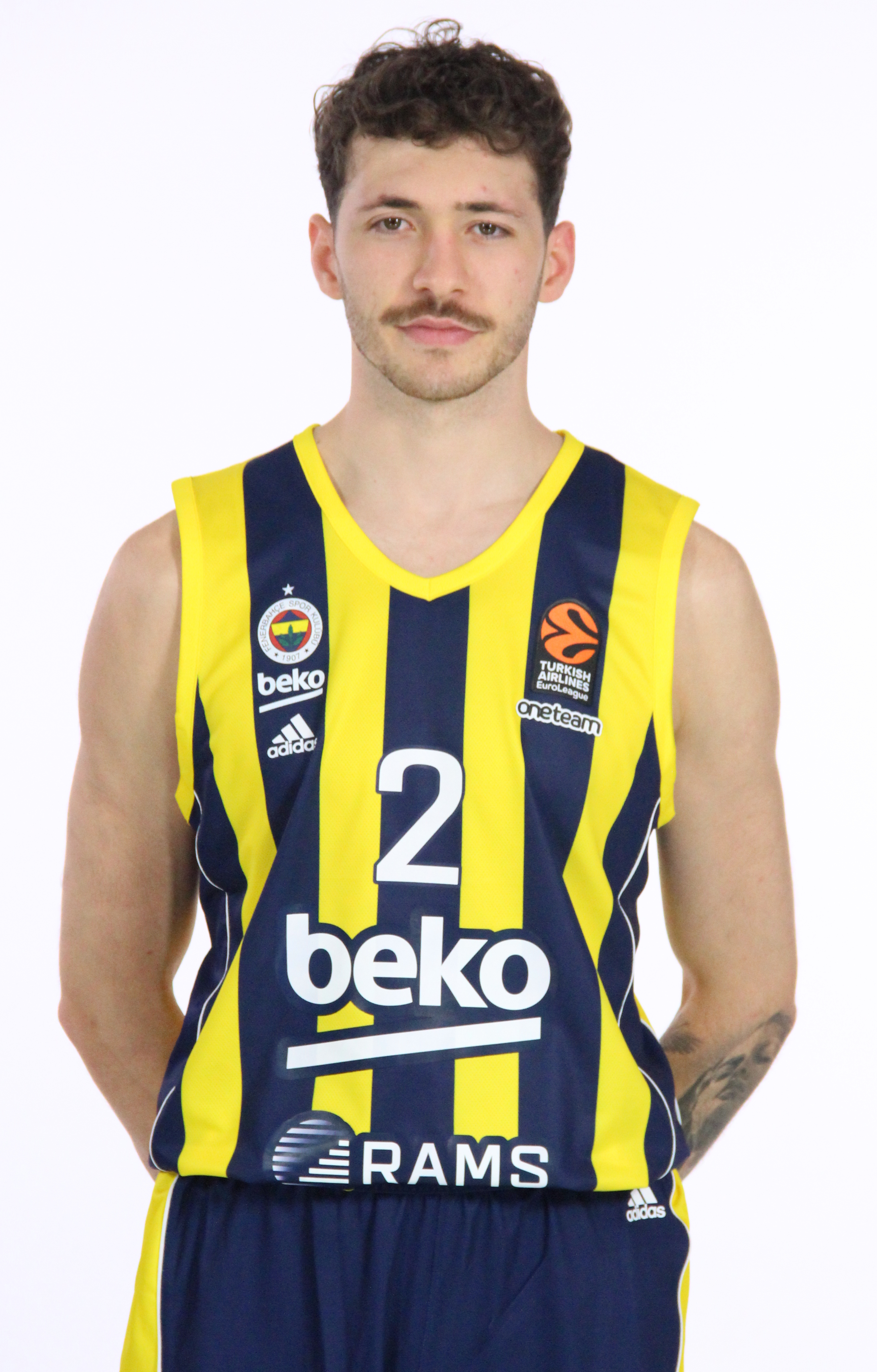

=== FIBA Europe Cup ===
Year	Team	GP	GS	MPG	FG%	3P%	FT%	RPG	APG	SPG	BPG	PPG
2020–21	Beşiktaş	3	3	34.8	.471	.429	.500	2.3	4.3	.7	—	14.0
Career		3	3	34.8	.471	.429	.500	2.3	4.3	.7	—	14.0

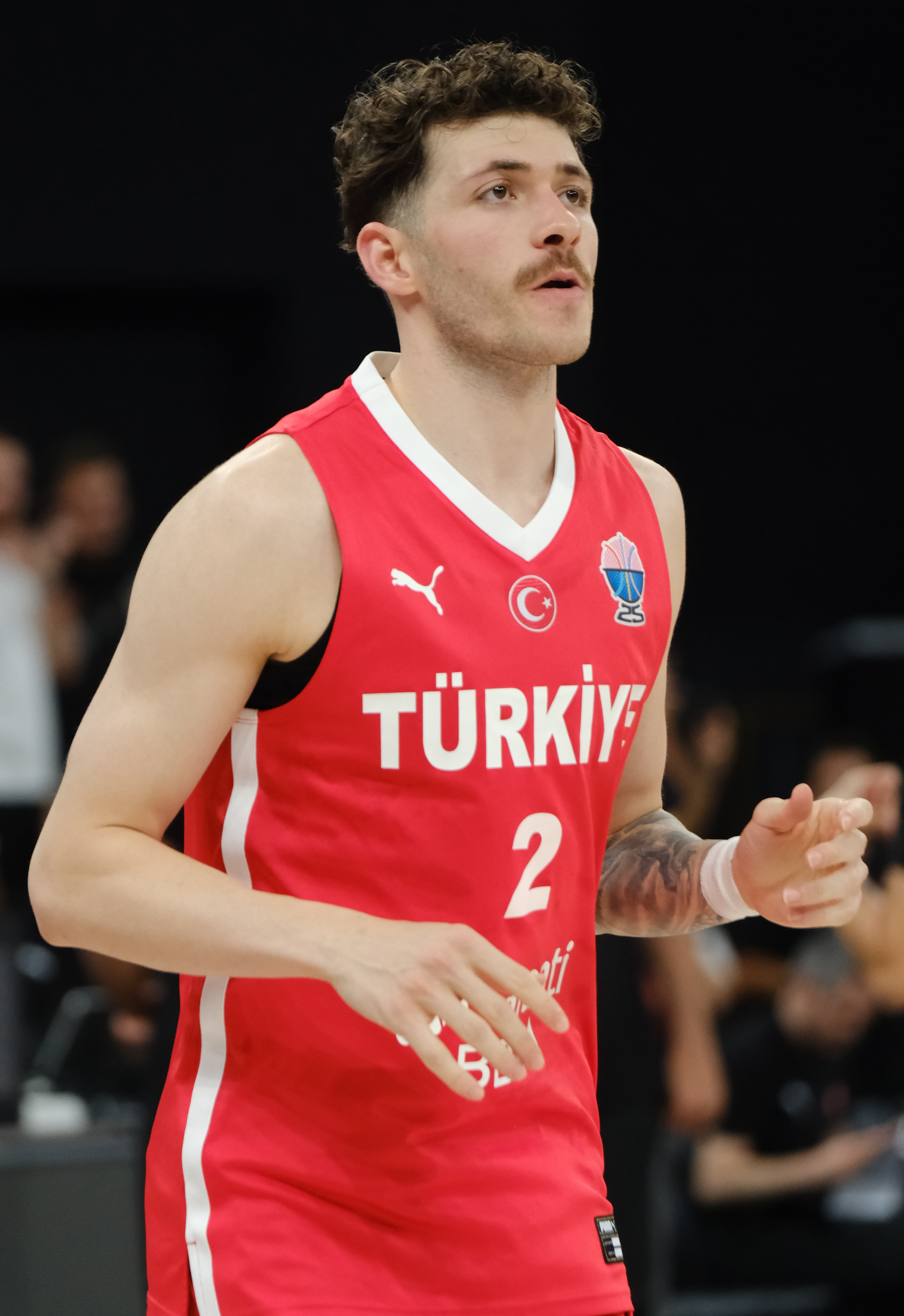
Hazer with Turkey national team in 2025

=== Domestic leagues ===
Year	Team	League	GP	MPG	FG%	3P%	FT%	RPG	APG	SPG	BPG	PPG
2015–16	(Turkey) Bandırma Kırmızı	TBL	2	8.0	.200	.000	—	.5	—	—	—	1.0
2016–17	(Turkey) Bandırma Kırmızı	TBL	31	15.7	.420	.265	.550	1.8	1.4	1.2	.0	5.0
2017–18	(Turkey) Bandırma Kırmızı	TBL	21	29.2	.445	.274	.753	3.6	2.3	1.8	.1	14.1
2017–18	(Turkey) Banvit B.K.	TBSL	22	9.7	.479	.316	.632	.7	.5	.4	.1	4.0
2018–19	(Turkey) Banvit B.K.	TBSL	27	15.9	.395	.179	.583	1.8	.9	.5	.0	5.3
2019–20	(Turkey) Bandırma B.İ.K.	TBSL	23	19.4	.366	.263	.675	2.4	1.8	.9	.0	7.4
2020–21	(Turkey) Beşiktaş	TBSL	33	32.3	.469	.298	.731	3.8	4.1	1.4	.1	14.9
2021–22	(Turkey) Fenerbahçe	TBSL	36	15.3	.472	.387	.632	1.6	2.2	.7	.1	6.0
2022–23	(Turkey) Fenerbahçe	TBSL	29	15.3	.414	.300	.653	2.2	1.9	.7	.0	7.0
2023–24	(Turkey) Fenerbahçe	TBSL	39	18.9	.461	.356	.765	3.2	2.8	1.0	.0	8.1
