= Tarik Biberović =

Bosnian basketball player (born 2001)

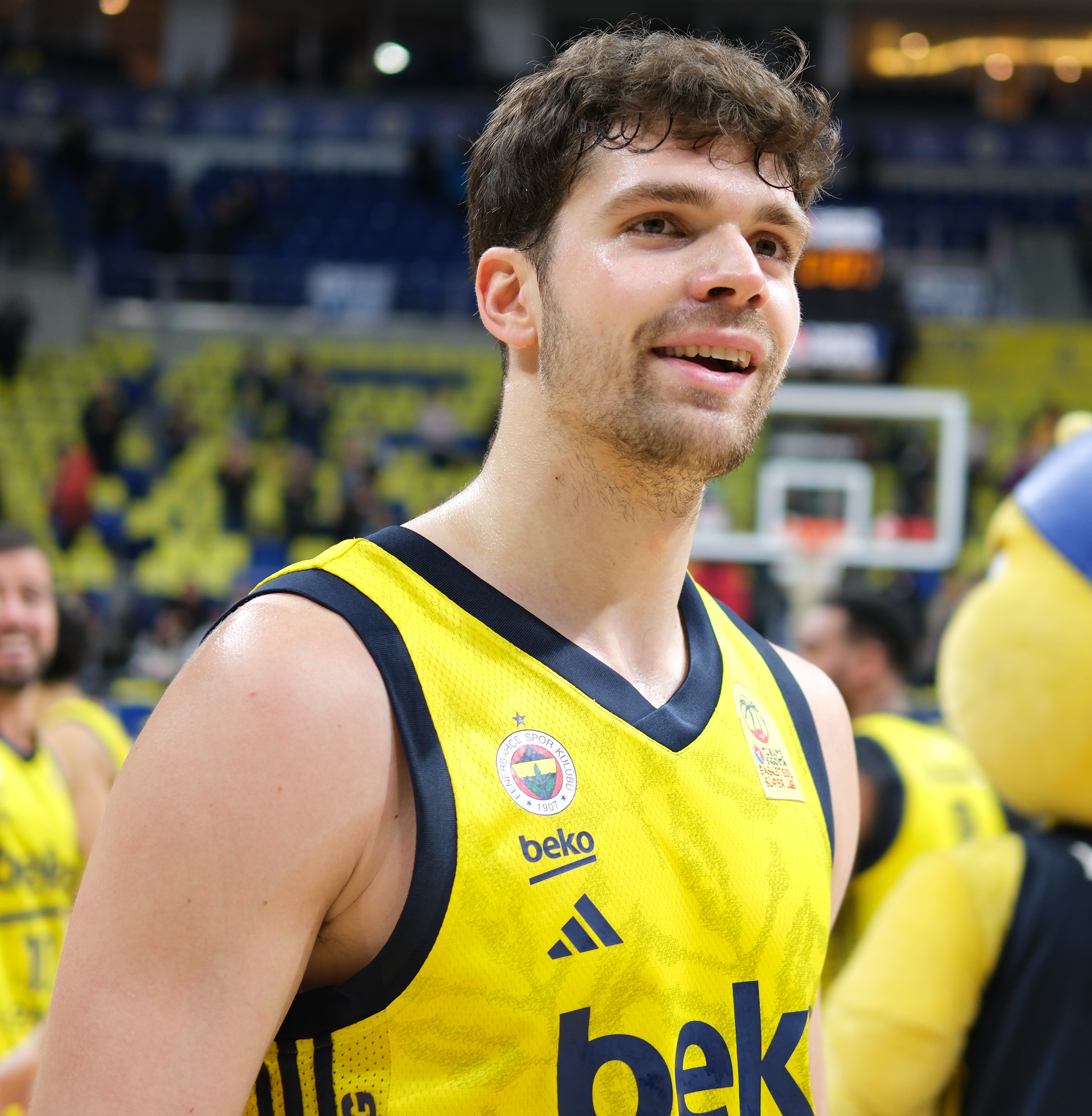
- Biberović with Fenerbahçe in 2025

No. 13 – Dallas Mavericks
- Position: Small forward
- League: NBA

Personal information
- Born: 28 January 2001 (age 25) Zenica, Bosnia and Herzegovina
- Listed height: 1.98 m (6 ft 6 in)
- Listed weight: 99 kg (218 lb)

Career information
- NBA draft: 2023: 2nd round, 56th overall pick
- Drafted by: Memphis Grizzlies
- Playing career: 2016–present

Career history
- 2016–2018: OKK Spars
- 2018–2026: Fenerbahçe
- 2026–present: Dallas Mavericks

Career highlights
- EuroLeague champion (2025); 4× Turkish Super League champion (2022, 2024–2026); 5× Turkish Cup winner (2019, 2020, 2024–2026); Turkish Super Cup winner (2025); Turkish Cup Final MVP (2026)
- Stats at NBA.com
- Stats at Basketball Reference

Tarik Biberović (born 28 January 2001) is a Bosnian professional basketball player for the Dallas Mavericks of the National Basketball Association (NBA). He represents Turkey internationally.

== Early life ==
Biberović was born in 2001 in Zenica, where he started his career in KK Ten Zenica.

== Professional career ==
=== OKK Spars (2016–2018) ===
At the age of 15, Biberović moved to Sarajevo to the OKK Spars. He drew attention especially with his performance in the Adidas Next Generation Tournament with the Spars team in the 2016–2017 season. Playing four games with Spars in this tournament, Biberović stayed on the court for 32.9 minutes and averaged 17.8 points, 6.3 rebounds, 2.3 assists and 1.3 blocks.

=== Fenerbahçe (2018–2026) ===
His potential earned him attention and he wound up linking up with Fenerbahçe, a club that plays in both the Basketball Super League in Turkey and the EuroLeague. He did not appear in any domestic games for the club during the 2018–19 campaign due to license rules, but he did make his EuroLeague debut in the match against Panathinaikos on 8 February 2019, at the age of 18. Not much changed the following year, as he made a few EuroLeague appearances but did not play in any Turkish League games. Also, he played at the Turkish Youth League, a level of competition that can hardly be considered challenging for a prospect of his caliber.

During the 2020–21 season, though, Biberović played a regular role in the Basketball Super League, appearing in 35 games and starting 11. He continued playing sparingly in EuroLeague games, but he did score 13 points — then his most in a EuroLeague game — against ALBA Berlin in December 2020 and, with Fenerbahçe missing several players due to COVID-19, played at least 14 minutes in the club's three EuroLeague playoff games and averaged 7.3 points and 3.7 rebounds.

On 19 October 2023, he scored his career high in EuroLeague with 17 points (1–2 2FG, 5–8 3FG) and 4 rebounds performance win over 101–86, against Asvel.

On 25 December 2023, he scored his career high in Basketball Super League with 29 points (with 7 rebounds, 2 assists, 1 steal, 34 pir) and 4 rebounds performance win over 98–58, against Darüşşafaka Lassa.

On 15 October 2024, he was fined €5,000 and suspended for Round 3 of the 2024–2025 Turkish Airlines EuroLeague Regular Season. He got into a scuffle under the basket with Elijah Bryant with referees having to intervene and break them apart, ultimately resulting in both of them being ejected and both were suspended for one match.

On 29 April 2025, he helped Fenerbahçe to sweep Paris Basketball as 3–0 in playoffs with 21 points (7 in overtime, 8–14 FG), 1 rebound and 3 assists performance in 88–98 away wictory.

On 25 May 2025, Biberović helped Fenerbahçe to their second EuroLeague championship in Abu Dhabi. He helped the team defeat the defending champions Panathinaikos in the semi-final with 15 points (5–9 FG) and 3 rebounds, and Monaco in the final with 3 points (1–4 FG) and 1 rebound.

On 10 July 2025, Biberović signed a new three-year deal with the reigning EuroLeague champions, despite significant interest from the Memphis Grizzlies who hold his NBA rights.

After a successful performance in the 2025–26 EuroLeague season, he equaled his career record with 26 points (4–5 2FG, 6–8 3FG) in the first playoff game against Žalgiris on 28 April 2026.

=== Dallas Mavericks (2026–present) ===
In June 2023, Biberović was selected in the second round of the 2023 NBA draft by the Memphis Grizzlies. On 8 July 2026, Biberović's draft rights were traded to the Dallas Mavericks as part of a six-team trade that sent D'Angelo Russell, AJ Johnson, Isaiah Stewart, and draft considerations to the Grizzlies. On 10 July, Biberović signed a two-year, $6 million contract with Dallas. Biberović wears number 13, though his favorite number is 33; he chose 13 after Fenerbahçe's equipment manager told him it would suit him and bring him luck when he signed his first professional contract at age 15.

== Career statistics ==
Legend
GP	Games played	GS	Games started	MPG	Minutes per game
FG%	Field-goal percentage	3P%	3-point field-goal percentage	FT%	Free-throw percentage
RPG	Rebounds per game	APG	Assists per game	SPG	Steals per game
BPG	Blocks per game	PPG	Points per game	PIR	Performance index rating
**Bold**	Career high	†	Won a EuroLeague championship	*	Led the league

=== EuroLeague ===
As of match played 22 May 2026

Year	Team	GP	GS	MPG	FG%	3P%	FT%	RPG	APG	SPG	BPG	PPG	PIR
2018–19	Fenerbahçe	8	0	5.9	.350	.125	.500	1.5	.1	.1	—	2.3	1.5
2019–20	Fenerbahçe	6	1	10.7	.280	.000	—	1.7	1.0	—	**.2**	2.3	0.7
2020–21	Fenerbahçe	16	2	9.4	.475	.389	.667	1.5	.3	.2	—	2.9	2.3
2021–22	Fenerbahçe	7	2	10.3	.280	.125	**1.000**	.7	.6	.4	.1	2.4	0.6
2022–23	Fenerbahçe	12	2	10.2	.361	.350	.500	.9	.3	**.5**	—	2.9	1.3
2023–24	Fenerbahçe	31	6	16.2	**.521**	**.531**	.920	2.2	.7	.3	—	7.0	5.6
2024–25 †	Fenerbahçe	37	7	22.3	.514	.432	.833	**3.1**	**1.4**	**.5**	**.2**	10.4	**8.4**
2025–26	Fenerbahçe	**41**	**36**	**24.3**	.461	.419	.952	3.0	1.3	.4	.1	**11.3**	8.3
Career		158	56	17.6	.497	.423	.864	2.3	.9	.4	.1	7.6	5.7

=== Domestic leagues ===
As of matches played 24 April 2026

†	Denotes seasons in which Tarik Biberović won the league

Year	Team	League	GP	MPG	FG%	3P%	FT%	RPG	APG	SPG	BPG	PPG
2016–17	Spars Sarajevo	Liga BiH	9	3.2	.357	**.625**	—	—	—	.1	—	1.7
2017–18	Spars Sarajevo	Liga BiH	22	9.2	.483	.382	.286	.9	.4	.3	—	3.3
2020–21	Fenerbahçe	TBSL	35	16.7	**.541**	.456	.826	2.4	1.2	**.5**	**.2**	6.8
2021–22 †	Fenerbahçe	TBSL	**36**	11.6	.462	.430	.839	1.5	.9	**.5**	.1	5.4
2022–23	Fenerbahçe	TBSL	24	14.6	.393	.348	.882	2.5	.5	.4	.1	5.3
2023–24 †	Fenerbahçe	TBSL	35	21.5	.514	.415	**.956**	3.3	1.5	.1	.1	10.4
2024–25 †	Fenerbahçe	TBSL	29	21.4	.462	.407	.951	3.4	1.7	**.5**	.1	9.7
2025–26 †	Fenerbahçe	TBSL	34	**24.0**	.498	.497	.897	**3.5**	**2.0**	.3	.1	**12.6**

Italic written statistics are current season's statistics.

== International ==
Biberović competed with Bosnia and Herzegovina at 2016 FIBA U16 European Championship, averaging 7.1 points, 4.1 rebounds and 0.9 assists. Tarik played his best match against Latvia in this tournament and scored 16 points.

In June 2018, he changed his international allegiance so that he could play for Turkey. On 23 February 2024, he played his international debut with Turkey against Italy in the EuroBasket 2025 qualification game. He recorded 27 points, 8 rebounds and 4 assists in a 87–80 defeat. On 25 February 2024, he scored 11 points (also 4 rebounds and 1 assist) including a game-winning buzzer-beater shot to give Turkey a 76–75 win.

== Personal life ==
He was born in Zenica to Bosniak parents. His younger brother Faruk Biberović played for Fenerbahçe Beko youth team Fenerbahçe Koleji Novotel.
