= Johnathan Motley =

American basketball player (born 1995)

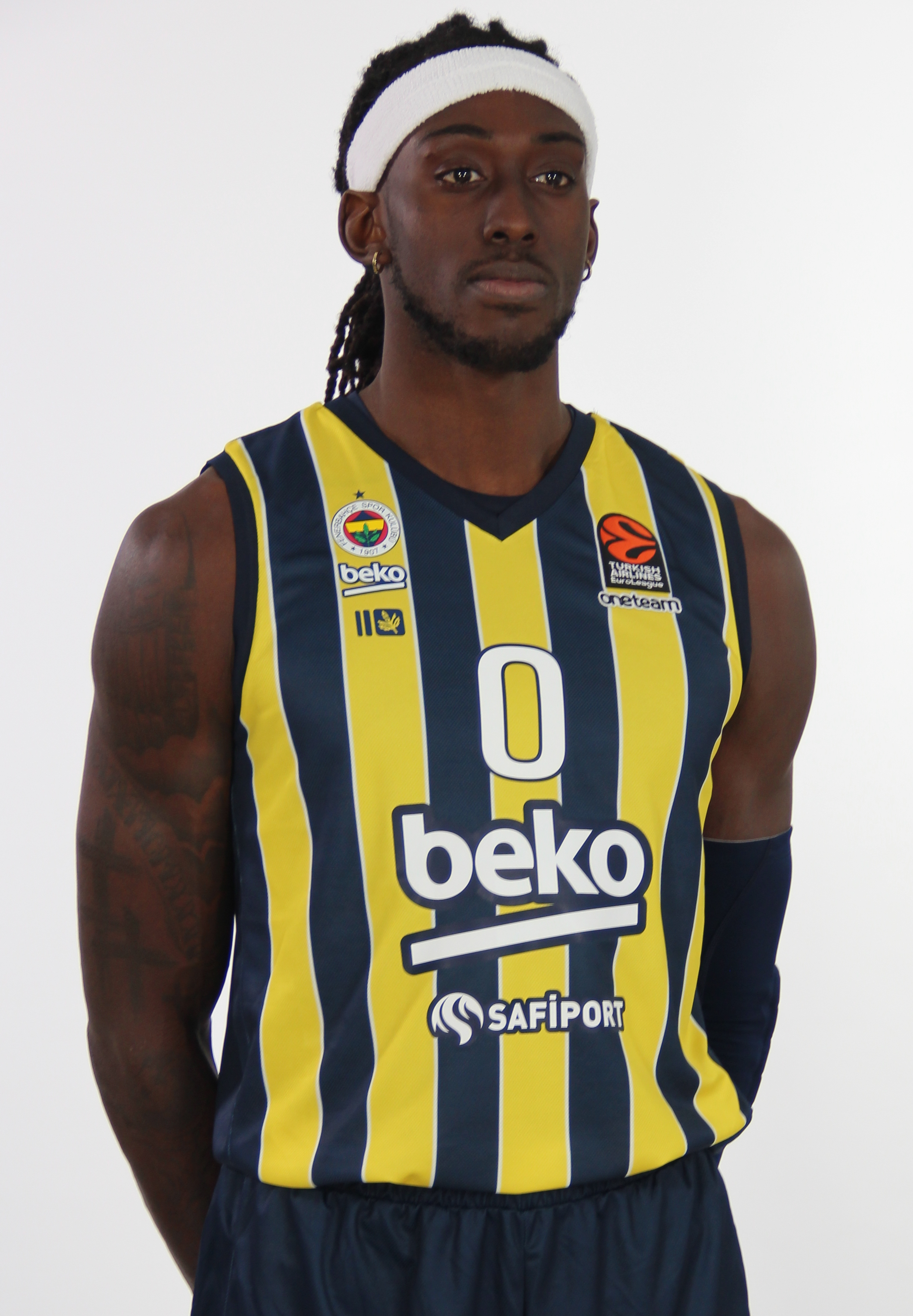
- Motley with Fenerbahçe Beko in 2022

No. 0 – Crvena zvezda
- Position: Center
- League: KLS; ABA League; EuroLeague

Personal information
- Born: May 4, 1995 (age 31) Houston, Texas, U.S.
- Listed height: 6 ft 9 in (2.06 m)
- Listed weight: 229 lb (104 kg)

Career information
- High school: North Shore (Houston, Texas)
- College: Baylor (2014–2017)
- NBA draft: 2017: undrafted
- Playing career: 2017–present

Career history
- 2017–2018: Dallas Mavericks
- 2017–2018: →Texas Legends
- 2018–2020: Los Angeles Clippers
- 2018–2020: →Agua Caliente Clippers
- 2021: Incheon ET Land Elephants
- 2021–2022: Lokomotiv Kuban
- 2022–2024: Fenerbahçe
- 2024–2026: Hapoel Tel Aviv
- 2026–present: Crvena zvezda

Career highlights
- EuroCup champion (2025); EuroCup Finals MVP (2025); All-EuroCup First Team (2025); Turkish League champion (2024); Turkish Cup winner (2024); All-Turkish League First Team (2023); All-Israeli League First Team (2025); All-VTB United League Second Team (2022); 3× All-NBA G League Second Team (2018–2020); Consensus second-team All-Americans (2017); Karl Malone Award (2017); First-team All-Big 12 (2017); Third-team All-Big 12 (2016)
- Stats at NBA.com
- Stats at Basketball Reference

Johnathan Landus Motley Harvey (born May 4, 1995) is an American professional basketball player for Crvena zvezda of the Basketball League of Serbia (KLS), the ABA League, and the EuroLeague. He played college basketball for the Baylor Bears, where he was a consensus second-team All-American as a junior.

== High school career ==
Motley played high school basketball at North Shore High School in Houston, Texas under head coach David Green. He led his team to a 32–4 mark as a junior and a 30–5 mark in as a senior, winning back to back district championships. A top 100 recruit nationally, Motley committed to play at Baylor on September 12, 2012.

Before his junior year of high school, Motley faced a life-threatening setback when his appendix burst. He spent 18 days at Texas Children's Hospital. During his recovery, he lost a significant amount of weight.

== College career ==
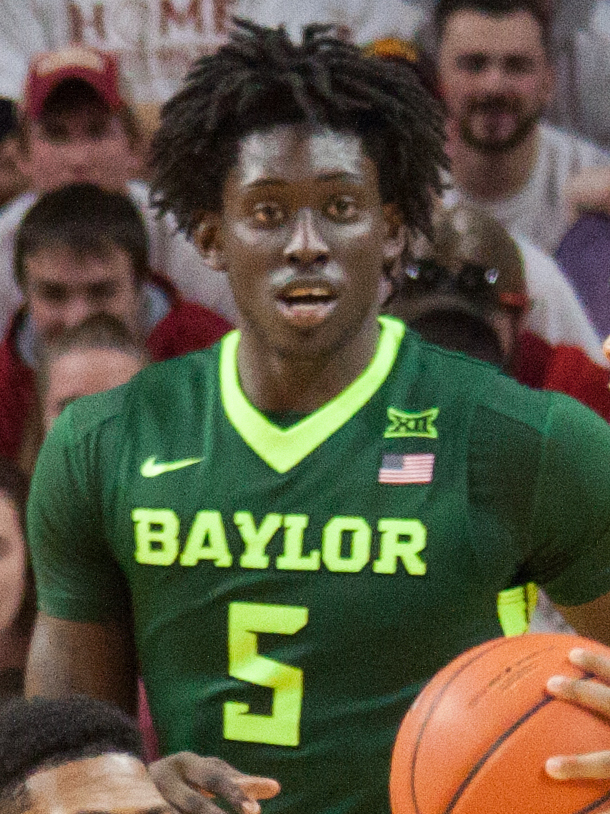
Motley with the Baylor Bears in 2017

Motley blossomed into an All-American player as a junior for Baylor, leading the Bears to their first number one ranking as a program during the 2016–17 season. At the close of the season, Motley was named the winner of the Karl Malone Award as the country's best college power forward.

At the close of his junior season, Motley declared his eligibility for the 2017 NBA draft but did not hire an agent, leaving open the option to return to college. He would later hire an agent before signing up for the 2017 NBA Draft Combine, thus ending any chances of returning for his senior year at Baylor.

== Professional career ==
=== Dallas Mavericks (2017–2018) ===
After going undrafted in 2017 NBA draft, Motley signed a two-way contract with the Dallas Mavericks. He became the first player in franchise history to sign such a deal. As a result, he got to split his time playing between the Mavericks and their G League affiliate, the Texas Legends. After recovering from a previous injury he had, Motley would make his official NBA debut on December 14, 2017, recording 4 points in two minutes under a 112–97 loss to the defending champion Golden State Warriors. On April 4, 2018, he scored a career high 26 points in a 106–113 loss to the Detroit Pistons.

=== Los Angeles Clippers (2018–2020) ===
On July 23, 2018, Motley, along with the draft rights to Renaldas Seibutis, was traded to the Los Angeles Clippers in exchange for the draft rights to Maarty Leunen and cash considerations. He would be the league's first ever two-way contract to be traded to another team. Motley would become an unrestricted free agent on June 28, 2019 but the Clippers eventually re-signed him on July 25, 2019.

On November 30, 2020, Motley signed a training camp deal with the Phoenix Suns, but was waived on December 19.

=== Incheon ET Land Elephants (2021) ===
On February 10, 2021, Motley signed with the Incheon ET Land Elephants of the Korean Basketball League (KBL), where he averaged 20.7 points, 8.9 rebounds, 3.3 assists and 1.4 blocks.

=== Lokomotiv Kuban (2021–2022) ===
On August 3, 2021, Motley signed with Lokomotiv Kuban of the VTB United League and the 7DAYS EuroCup. He left the team after the 2022 Russian invasion of Ukraine.

=== Fenerbahçe Beko (2022–2024) ===
On June 20, 2022, Motley signed with Fenerbahçe Beko of the Turkish Basketball Super League (BSL), his first EuroLeague club. He awarded EuroLeague MVP of the Round 19 with 22 points and 17 rebounds of 38 PIR.

=== Hapoel Tel Aviv (2024–2026) ===
On June 25, 2024, he signed with Hapoel Tel Aviv of the Israeli Basketball Premier League. He enjoyed a highly successful stint with the Israeli club, leading them to the EuroCup title in 2025 while being named the EuroCup Finals MVP and earning a spot on the All-EuroCup First Team.

In October 2024, Motley was named MVP of Round 3 of the 2024 BKT EuroCup. He scored 24 points, 6 rebounds and had 4 assists.

In March 2026, Motley suffered an ankle injury during practice.

=== Crvena Zvezda (2026–present) ===
On July 17, 2026, Motley signed with Crvena zvezda for the 2026-2027 season.

== Career statistics ==
Legend
GP	Games played	GS	Games started	MPG	Minutes per game
FG%	Field-goal percentage	3P%	3-point field-goal percentage	FT%	Free-throw percentage
RPG	Rebounds per game	APG	Assists per game	SPG	Steals per game
BPG	Blocks per game	PPG	Points per game	PIR	Performance index rating
**Bold**	Career high

=== NBA ===
==== Regular season ====
Year	Team	GP	GS	MPG	FG%	3P%	FT%	RPG	APG	SPG	BPG	PPG
2017–18	Dallas	11	**4**	**16.0**	.533	.167	.536	**4.5**	**.6**	**.3**	**.2**	**8.7**
2018–19	L.A. Clippers	**22**	0	7.1	.534	.000	.600	2.3	.5	.2	.1	4.6
2019–20	L.A. Clippers	13	0	3.2	**.733**	**1.000**	**.714**	.8	**.6**	.2	.0	2.2
Career		46	4	8.1	.552	.200	.587	2.4	.6	.2	.1	4.9

=== EuroLeague ===
Year	Team	GP	GS	MPG	FG%	3P%	FT%	RPG	APG	SPG	BPG	PPG	PIR
2022–23	Fenerbahçe	**36**	**25**	**23.3**	.609	.231	.684	**5.4**	**1.6**	**.6**	**.4**	**14.5**	**16.0**
2023–24	Fenerbahçe	**36**	19	18.7	**.648**	**.250**	**.709**	4.2	1.1	.2	.2	11.2	12.2
Career		72	44	21.0	.625	.235	.696	4.8	1.3	.4	.3	12.8	14.1

=== EuroCup ===
†	Denotes seasons in which Motley won the EuroCup

Year	Team	GP	GS	MPG	FG%	3P%	FT%	RPG	APG	SPG	BPG	PPG	PIR
2021–22	Lokomotiv Kuban	9	9	**26.8**	**.628**	.333	**.734**	**7.0**	1.3	**.9**	**.8**	**21.2**	**23.9**
2024–25†	Hapoel Tel Aviv	**20**	**20**	25.8	.600	**.429**	.691	4.8	**2.5**	.4	.5	16.7	19.5
Career		29	29	26.1	.616	.385	.706	5.5	2.1	.6	.6	18.1	20.8

=== Domestic leagues ===
†	Denotes seasons in which Motley won the league

Year	Team	League	GP	MPG	FG%	3P%	FT%	RPG	APG	SPG	BPG	PPG
2017–18	(United States) Texas Legends	G League	34	32.5	.565	.280	.698	9.8	2.0	.9	1.1	22.2
2018–19	(United States) A. C. Clippers	G League	27	34.2	.553	.296	.701	10.0	3.2	.6	.9	24.5
2019–20	(United States) A. C. Clippers	G League	26	33.0	.518	.356	.753	7.9	2.8	.7	1.0	24.0
2020–21	(South Korea) Incheon Elephants	KBL	24	25.6	.534	.347	.722	8.9	3.2	.7	1.4	20.7
2021–22	(Russia) Lokomotiv Kuban	VTBUL	14	30.2	.589	.333	.798	7.6	2.4	1.3	1.1	19.4
2022–23	(Turkey) Fenerbahçe	TBSL	33	23.4	.621	.200	.703	5.8	1.6	.4	.6	15.4
2023–24†	(Turkey) Fenerbahçe	TBSL	19	20.1	.638	.250	.727	4.9	1.7	.4	.6	14.5
2024–25	(Israel) Hapoel Tel Aviv	Ligat HaAl	26	23.4	.573	.400	.690	5.0	2.6	.3	.6	14.4

=== College ===
Year	Team	GP	GS	MPG	FG%	3P%	FT%	RPG	APG	SPG	BPG	PPG
2014–15	Baylor	**34**	**34**	21.5	.431	.200	.625	4.2	.7	.4	**1.4**	7.7
2015–16	Baylor	**34**	9	20.9	**.619**	.0	.607	5.1	.9	**.5**	1.1	11.1
2016–17	Baylor	**34**	**34**	**30.5**	.541	**.273**	**.699**	**9.9**	**2.3**	.4	1.1	**17.3**
Career		102	77	24.3	.535	.240	.654	6.4	1.3	.4	1.2	12.0
