= Elijah Bryant =

American basketball player (born 1995)

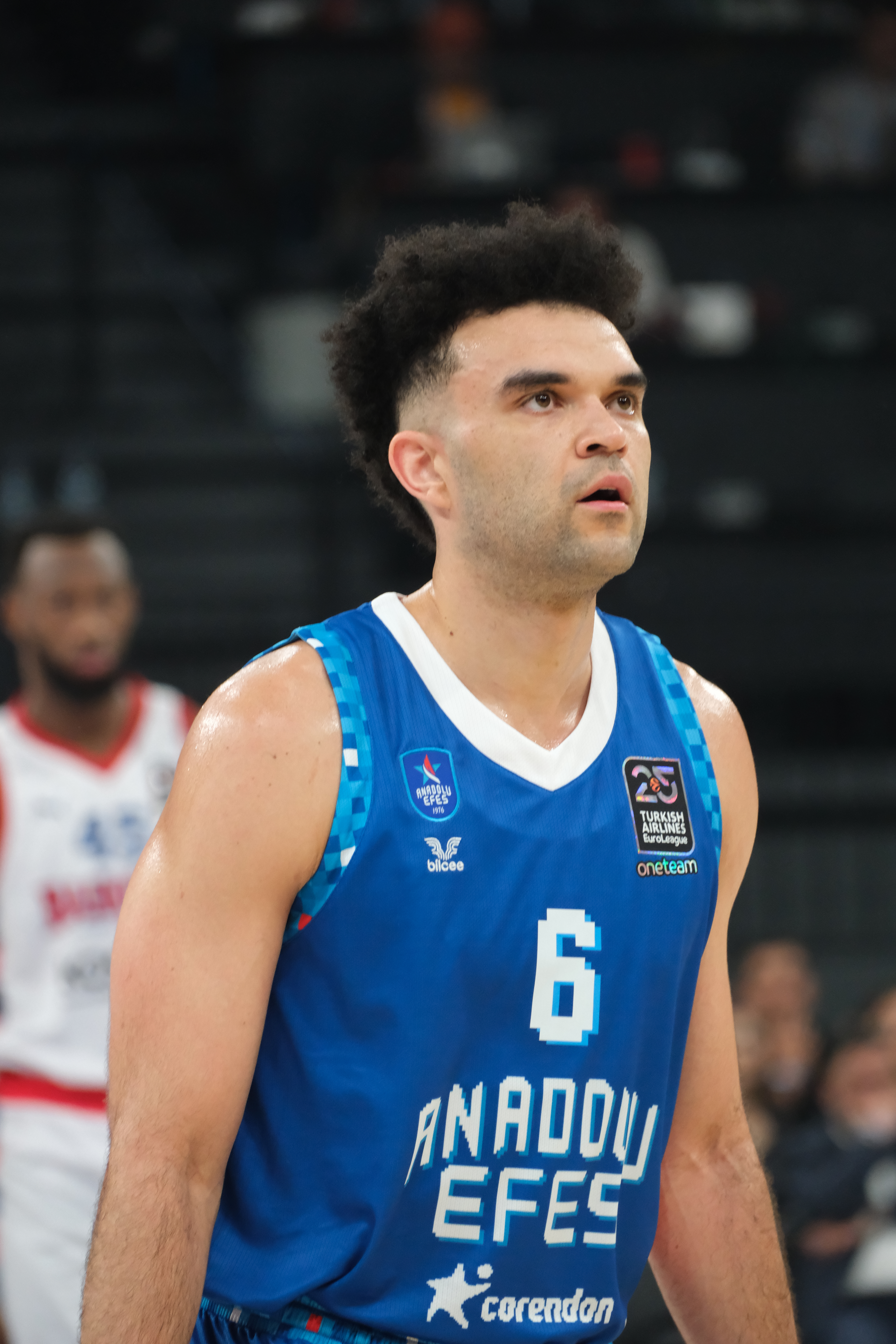
- Bryant with Anadolu Efes in 2025

No. 3 – Hapoel Tel Aviv
- Position: Shooting guard / small forward
- League: Israeli Basketball Premier League; EuroLeague

Personal information
- Born: April 19, 1995 (age 31) Gwinnett County, Georgia, U.S.
- Listed height: 6 ft 5 in (1.96 m)
- Listed weight: 210 lb (95 kg)

Career information
- High school: Mill Creek (Hoschton, Georgia); New Hampton School (New Hampton, New Hampshire)
- College: Elon (2014–2015); BYU (2016–2018)
- NBA draft: 2018: undrafted
- Playing career: 2018–present

Career history
- 2018–2019: Hapoel Eilat
- 2019–2021: Maccabi Tel Aviv
- 2021: Milwaukee Bucks
- 2021–2025: Anadolu Efes
- 2025–present: Hapoel Tel Aviv

Career highlights
- NBA champion (2021); EuroLeague champion (2022); All-EuroLeague First Team (2026); Turkish Super League champion (2023); Turkish Cup winner (2022); 2× Turkish Supercup winner (2022, 2024); Turkish Supercup MVP (2024); Israeli Basketball Premier League champion (2020); All-Israeli League First Team (2019); First-team All-WCC (2018); CAA Rookie of the Year (2015); Third-team All-CAA (2015)
- Stats at NBA.com
- Stats at Basketball Reference

Elijah Brigham Bryant (born April 19, 1995) is an American professional basketball player for Hapoel Tel Aviv of the Israeli Basketball Premier League and the EuroLeague.

He played college basketball for the Elon Phoenix and Brigham Young Cougars. He has played on teams that have been Israeli Basketball Premier League champion (2020), NBA champion (2021), EuroLeague champion (2022), and Turkish Super League champion (2023).

== Early life ==
Born in Gwinnett County, Georgia,, and raised in Hoschton, Georgia, Bryant began playing basketball at a young age, always playing against older children. As a junior in high school, he had a growth spurt and grew one foot in a year. He attended New Hampton School in New Hampton, New Hampshire, where he averaged 13 points, four rebounds, and four assists per game and led the Huskies to the NEPSAC AAA final.

== College career ==
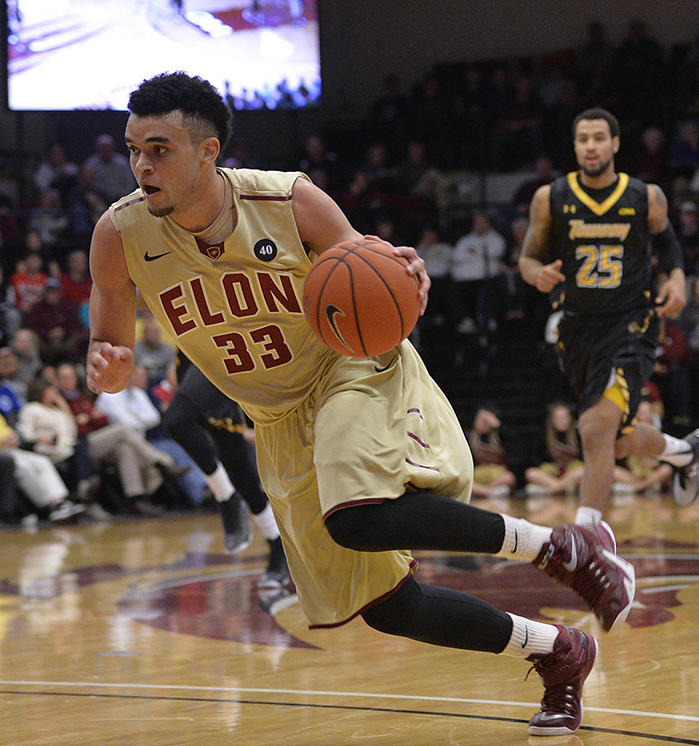
Bryant as a college freshman in 2015

Bryant started his college career with Elon University, with whom he averaged 14.2 points (8th in the league), 4.2 rebounds, 2.7 assists, and 1.3 steals (10th) per game in his freshman year, while shooting 75.1% from the free throw line (10th). Bryant was named Colonial Athletic Association (CAA) Rookie of the Year and earned spots on the Third-team All-CAA and the CAA All-Rookie Team.

On July 28, 2015, Bryant transferred from Elon to Brigham Young University (BYU), but he sat out first season at BYU per NCAA transfer rules. He posted 11.7 points, 3.6 rebounds, and 2.2 assists per game as a sophomore in 2016-17. He only played in 23 games, due to a knee injury. Despite his injury, Bryant scored a career-high 39 points, including seven 3-pointers, in a win against Portland.

In his junior year at BYU in 2017-18, Bryant finished the season as the West Coast Conference (WCC) second-leading scorer with 18.1 points per game, third in free-throw percentage (.850), third in 3-point field goal percentage (.415), fourth in steals (1.3), fifth in field goal percentage (.494), eighth in rebounds (6.3), and tied for seventh in double-doubles. On February 27, 2018, Bryant earned a spot in the First-team All-WCC. On April 18, 2018, after completing his junior year at BYU, Bryant announced his plans to graduate and forgo his remaining eligibility for a professional career.

== Professional career ==
=== Hapoel Eilat (2018–2019) ===
After going undrafted in the 2018 NBA draft, Bryant joined the Philadelphia 76ers for the 2018 NBA Summer League.

On August 30, 2018, Bryant started his professional career with Hapoel Eilat of the Israeli Basketball Premier League, signing a one-year deal. On October 29, 2018, he recorded a season-high 31 points, shooting 11-of-20 from the field, along with seven rebounds in an 81–75 win over Bnei Herzliya. On December 4, 2018, Bryant was named Israeli Basketball Premier League Player of the Month after averaging 20.5 points, 8.3 rebounds, and 2 steals in four games played in November. He helped Eilat reach the 2019 Israeli Basketball Premier League Final Four, where they eventually lost to Maccabi Tel Aviv. In 36 games played for Eilat, he finished as the league 's fourth-leading scorer (17.5 points per game) and fourth in efficiency rating (19.4 per game), along with 5.7 rebounds, 2.5 assists, and 1.4 steals per game, as he shot .558 from the field. On June 6, 2019, Bryant earned a spot on the All-Israeli Basketball Premier League First Team.

=== Maccabi Tel Aviv (2019–2021) ===
On July 1, 2019, Bryant joined the Milwaukee Bucks for the 2019 NBA Summer League, where he averaged 14.2 points, 4.0 rebounds, and 3.2 assists per game. In 49 games for Maccabi Tel Aviv in 2019-20, he averaged 8.9 points, 3.6 rebounds, 2.1 assists, and 1.1 steals per game.

On July 23, 2019, Bryant signed a two-year deal with Maccabi Tel Aviv. On February 5, 2020, Bryant recorded a EuroLeague career-high 21 points, while shooting 9-of-19 from the field, along with six rebounds and four assists, leading Maccabi to an 80–77 win over Khimki. In 52 games for Maccabi Tel Aviv in 2020-21, he averaged 11.1 points, 3.3 rebounds, 2.2 assists, and 0.8 steals per game, shooting .840 from the free throw line.

On May 10, 2021, he left Maccabi Tel Aviv.

=== Milwaukee Bucks (2021) ===
On May 13, 2021, Bryant signed with the Milwaukee Bucks. In his first and only regular-season NBA game, Bryant scored 16 points against the Chicago Bulls on May 16, 2021, in the Bucks' season finale. He won an NBA championship when the Bucks defeated the Phoenix Suns in 6 games in the 2021 NBA Finals. By playing 11 playoff games and only one regular season game in his NBA career, Bryant has played in 10 more playoffs games in his career than he has regular season games. In those 11 playoff games he averaged 1.3 points and 1.1 rebounds in 4.5 minutes per game.

On September 26, he was waived by the Bucks, but he was re-signed three days later. On October 14, the Bucks again waived Bryant.

=== Anadolu Efes (2021–2025) ===
On October 18, 2021, Bryant signed with Anadolu Efes of the Basketbol Süper Ligi in Turkey. On May 21, 2022, Bryant won the Euroleague with Anadolu Efes, grabbing 8 rebounds and contributing one assist in the championship game win against Real Madrid. On June 22, 2023, it was announced that he had renewed his contract for another two years.

On October 15, 2024, Bryant was fined €10,000 and suspended from the third round of the 2024-2025 Turkish Airlines EuroLeague regular season. Bryant had gotten into a scuffle under the basket with Tarik Biberovic. Referees had to intervene and break them apart, ultimately resulting in both of them being ejected and both were suspended for one match, and both were fined. On July 1, 2025, Bryant parted ways with the Turkish team.

=== Hapoel Tel Aviv (2025–present) ===
On July 6, 2025, Bryant signed with Hapoel Tel Aviv of the Israeli Basketball Premier League. In 52 games for Hapoel Tel Aviv in 2025-26, he averaged 15.0 points, 5.0 rebounds, 3.7 assists, and 0.7 steals per game, while shooting .512 from the field and .854 from the free throw line. He was named All-Euroleague 2026 First Team.

On July 11, 2026, the team extended Bryant's contract until 2029.

== Career statistics ==
Legend
GP	Games played	GS	Games started	MPG	Minutes per game
FG%	Field-goal percentage	3P%	3-point field-goal percentage	FT%	Free-throw percentage
RPG	Rebounds per game	APG	Assists per game	SPG	Steals per game
BPG	Blocks per game	PPG	Points per game	PIR	Performance index rating
**Bold**	Career high

=== NBA ===
==== Regular season ====
†	Denotes seasons in which Bryant won the NBA

Year	Team	GP	GS	MPG	FG%	3P%	FT%	RPG	APG	SPG	BPG	PPG
2020–21†	Milwaukee	1	0	31.6	.462	.200	1.000	6.0	3.0	—	1.0	16.0
Career		1	0	31.6	.462	.200	1.000	6.0	3.0	—	1.0	16.0

==== Playoffs ====
Year	Team	GP	GS	MPG	FG%	3P%	FT%	RPG	APG	SPG	BPG	PPG
2021†	Milwaukee	11	0	4.5	.350	.000	—	1.1	.4	.2	.1	1.3
Career		11	0	4.5	.350	.000	—	1.1	.4	.2	.1	1.3

=== EuroLeague ===
†	Denotes seasons in which Bryant won the EuroLeague

Year	Team	GP	GS	MPG	FG%	3P%	FT%	RPG	APG	SPG	BPG	PPG	PIR
2019–20	Maccabi Tel Aviv	27	15	19.7	.492	**.417**	.692	2.9	2.0	.9	.1	8.4	7.6
2020–21	Maccabi Tel Aviv	34	26	23.3	.440	.369	.847	3.0	2.0	.9	.1	9.8	8.8
2021–22†	Anadolu Efes	36	13	18.8	.451	.368	.810	2.9	1.2	.6	.1	5.3	5.2
2022–23	Anadolu Efes	34	24	22.7	.524	.390	.860	4.1	1.5	.7	**.4**	8.5	9.9
2023–24	Anadolu Efes	24	8	21.7	.461	.382	.872	3.9	2.7	.7	.3	9.7	11.5
2024–25	Anadolu Efes	**38**	31	27.0	.444	.365	**.900**	'4.2	3.1	1.2	.2	13.8	14.4
2025–26	Hapoel Tel Aviv	**38**	**38**	**29.2**	**.527**	.372	.893	**5.2**	**3.3**	.7	.1	**15.4**	**19.6**
2026-27	Hapoel Tel Aviv	12	12	29.4	.442	.333	.906	5.4	3.8	1.2	.1	14.6	21.2
Career		243	167	23.9	.475	.376	.877	3.9	2.4	.8	.2	10.5	11.7

=== Domestic leagues ===
Year	Team	League	GP	MPG	FG%	3P%	FT%	RPG	APG	SPG	BPG	PPG
2018–19	(Israel) Hapoel Eilat	Ligat HaAl	36	32.0	.558	.359	.767	5.7	2.5	1.4	.3	17.5
2018–19	(Israel) Maccabi Tel Aviv	Ligat HaAl	22	23.5	.417	.262	.804	4.4	2.1	1.4	.1	9.5
2020–21	(Israel) Maccabi Tel Aviv	Ligat HaAl	18	23.2	.554	.420	.829	3.8	2.8	.9	.2	13.6
2021–22	(Turkey) Anadolu Efes	TBSL	30	24.8	.545	.412	.881	4.2	2.2	1.0	.1	11.0
2022–23	(Turkey) Anadolu Efes	TBSL	26	27.9	.530	.471	.797	4.8	3.3	.1	.3	14.0
2023–24	(Turkey) Anadolu Efes	TBSL	18	26.6	.478	.311	.806	5.2	4.4	1.3	.3	13.4
2024–25	(Turkey) Anadolu Efes	TBSL	28	21.8	.489	.383	.813	2.2	3.0	1.1	.1	10.5

=== College ===
Year	Team	GP	GS	MPG	FG%	3P%	FT%	RPG	APG	SPG	BPG	PPG
2014–15	Elon	33	13	25.5	.382	.349	.751	4.2	**2.7**	**1.3**	.4	14.2
2016–17	BYU	23	9	24.7	.426	.278	.796	3.6	2.2	.9	.3	11.7
2017–18	BYU	**35**	**34**	**34.7**	**.494**	**.415**	**.850**	**6.3**	2.3	**1.3**	**.5**	**18.2**
Career		91	56	28.8	.437	.366	.800	4.9	2.4	1.2	.4	15.1

== Personal life ==
Bryant is the son of Israel Bryant and Reginald Strother, a physician. He is a member of the Church of Jesus Christ of Latter-day Saints. Bryant remarked in 2020, after playing in Israel, "I’ve come to respect the Jews a lot because they’re very similar to Mormons. They value family." He married Jenelle Fraga in August 2017. They have one son.
