= 2024–25 Fenerbahçe S.K. (basketball) season =

111th season

Fenerbahçe Beko
2024–25 season
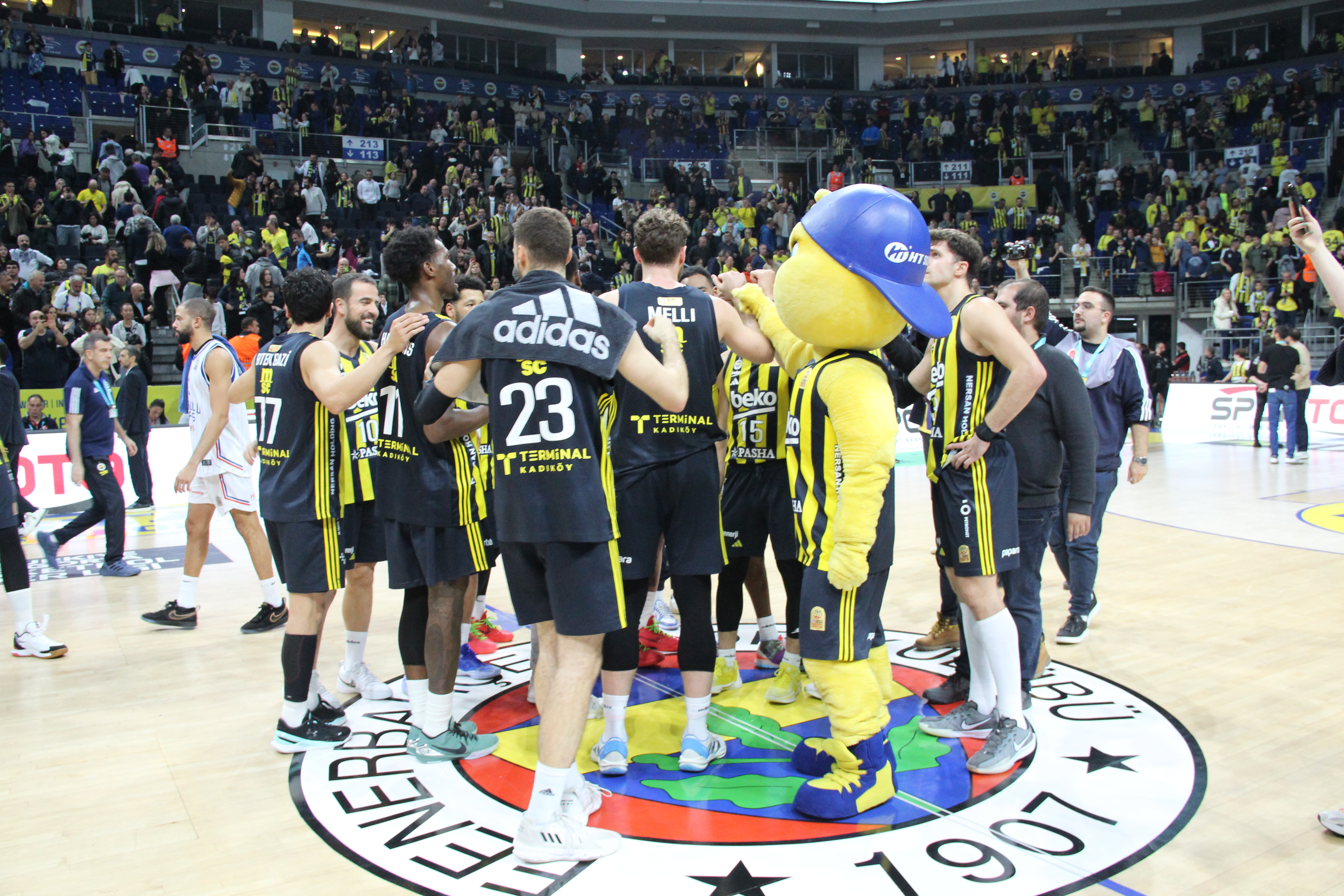
- Fenerbahçe Beko roster in November 2024
- President: Ali Koç
- Head coach: Šarūnas Jasikevičius
- Arena: Ülker Sports and Event Hall
- Basketbol Süper Ligi: 1st seed
- Playoffs: Champions
- EuroLeague: Champions
- Presidential Cup: Runners-up
- Turkish Basketball Cup: Champions
- PIR leader: (United States) Hayes-Davis 16.3
- Scoring leader: (United States) Hayes-Davis 15.5
- Rebounding leader: (United States) Hayes-Davis 4.7
- Assists leader: (United States) Baldwin 3.7
- Average home attendance: EuroLeague: 10,785

The 2024–25 season was Fenerbahçe's 111th season in the existence of the club. The team played in the Basketbol Süper Ligi and in the EuroLeague.

== Players ==
=== Squad information ===
Note: Flags indicate national team eligibility at FIBA-sanctioned events. Players may hold other non-FIBA nationalities not displayed.

Fenerbahçe Beko roster
Players
Coaches

Pos.	No.	Nat.	Name	Ht.	Wt.	Age
G	0	(United States)	McCollum, Errick	1.88 m (6 ft 2 in)	87 kg (192 lb)	37 – 22 January 1988
F	1	(Turkey) (Republic of Ireland)	Birsen, Metecan	2.08 m (6 ft 10 in)	101 kg (223 lb)	30 – 6 April 1995
G	2	(United States)	Baldwin IV, Wade	1.92 m (6 ft 4 in)	91 kg (201 lb)	29 – 29 March 1996
PG	3	(United States)	Wilbekin, Scottie	1.88 m (6 ft 2 in)	80 kg (176 lb)	32 – 5 April 1993
F/C	4	(Italy)	Melli, Nicolò	2.05 m (6 ft 9 in)	110 kg (243 lb)	34 – 26 January 1991
F/C	5	(Turkey)	Şanlı, Sertaç	2.13 m (7 ft 0 in)	115 kg (254 lb)	33 – 5 August 1991
PG	8	(Turkey) (Northern Cyprus)	Ziyaettin, Ömer Ege	1.88 m (6 ft 2 in)		17 – 20 May 2008
G	10	(Turkey)	Mahmutoğlu, Melih (C)	1.91 m (6 ft 3 in)	85 kg (187 lb)	35 – 12 May 1990
F	11	(United States)	Hayes-Davis, Nigel	2.02 m (6 ft 8 in)	103 kg (227 lb)	30 – 16 December 1994
F	13	(Bosnia and Herzegovina) (Turkey)	Biberović, Tarik	2.01 m (6 ft 7 in)	100 kg (220 lb)	24 – 28 January 2001
PG	15	(Turkey)	Ekşioğlu, Mert Emre	1.88 m (6 ft 2 in)		23 – 2 January 2002
G	20	(United States)	Hall, Devon	1.97 m (6 ft 6 in)	86 kg (190 lb)	29 – 7 July 1995
F	21	(Canada)	Pierre, Dyshawn	1.98 m (6 ft 6 in)	104 kg (229 lb)	31 – 17 November 1993
SF	22	(Turkey)	Mestoğlu, Yiğit Hamza	2.02 m (6 ft 8 in)	93 kg (205 lb)	21 – 22 April 2004
SG	23	(Serbia)	Gudurić, Marko	1.98 m (6 ft 6 in)	91 kg (201 lb)	30 – 8 March 1995
PG	32	(Latvia)	Žagars, Artūrs	1.90 m (6 ft 3 in)	78 kg (172 lb)	25 – 21 April 2000
F	44	(Angola)	Bango, Jilson	2.08 m (6 ft 10 in)	94 kg (207 lb)	26 – 6 January 1999
F	50	(United States)	Colson, Bonzie	1.97 m (6 ft 6 in)	102 kg (225 lb)	29 – 12 January 1996
PF	92	(Canada)	Birch, Khem	2.05 m (6 ft 9 in)	106 kg (234 lb)	32 – 28 September 1992

Head coach

- (Lithuania) Šarūnas Jasikevičius

Assistant coach(es)

- (Lithuania) Tomas Masiulis
- (Turkey) Ertuğrul Erdoğan
- (Spain) David Garcia
- (Turkey) Alp Timuçin Yener

Athletic trainer(s)

- (Greece) Kostas Chatzichristos
- (Turkey) İlker Belgutay

Physiotherapist(s)

- (Turkey) Rıza Özdemir
- (Turkey) Şahir Uğur Sezer
- (Greece) Kosmas Kontogiannis

Team manager

- (Turkey) Cenk Renda

Legend

- (C) Team captain
- (DC) Dual citizenship
- Injured

- Roster
Updated: 30 June 2025

=== Depth chart ===
Pos.	Starting 5	Bench 1	Bench 2	Bench 3	Inactive
C	Khem Birch	Nicolò Melli	Sertaç Şanlı	Jilson Bango
PF	Nigel Hayes-Davis	Dyshawn Pierre		Metecan Birsen
SF	Tarik Biberović	Bonzie Colson			Yiğit Hamza Mestoğlu
SG	Marko Gudurić	Errick McCollum		Melih Mahmutoğlu	Mert Emre Ekşioğlu
PG	Devon Hall	Wade Baldwin IV	Artūrs Žagars	Scottie Wilbekin (injured)	Ömer Ege Ziyaettin

=== Transactions ===
==== In ====
No.	Pos.	Nat.	Name	Age	Moving from		Ends	Date	Source
20	SG	(United States)	Devon Hall	28	Olimpia Milano	(Italy)	June 2026	17 June 2024	
4	F/C	(Italy)	Nicolò Melli	33	Olimpia Milano	(Italy)	June 2026	25 June 2024	
50	F	(United States)	Bonzie Colson	28	Maccabi Tel Aviv	(Israel)	June 2026	28 June 2024	
77	SG	(Turkey)	Erten Gazi	27	Anadolu Efes	(Turkey)	June 2025	1 July 2024	
2	G	(United States)	Wade Baldwin IV	28	Maccabi Tel Aviv	(Israel)	June 2026	10 July 2024	
–	F/C	(Croatia)	Luka Šamanić	24	Utah Jazz	(United States)	June 2025	5 August 2024	
92	C	(Canada)	Khem Birch	31	Bàsquet Girona	(Spain)	June 2025	11 September 2024	
51	C	(Serbia)	Boban Marjanović	36	Houston Rockets	(United States)	June 2025	18 September 2024	
9	PG	(United States)	Skylar Mays	27	Los Angeles Lakers	(United States)	June 2025	18 October 2024	
0	G	(United States)	Errick McCollum	36	Karşıyaka Basket	(Turkey)	June 2025	10 January 2025	
44	C	(Angola)	Jilson Bango	26	Zaragoza	(Spain)	June 2027	3 February 2025	

==== Out ====
No.	Pos.	Nat.	Name	Age	Moving to		Date	Source
77	F/C	(United States)	Nate Sestina	27	Valencia	(Spain)	17 June 2024	
33	PG	(Greece)	Nick Calathes	35	AS Monaco	(France)	17 June 2024	
41	PG	(Israel)	Yam Madar	23	Bayern Munich	(Germany)	18 June 2024	
0	F/C	(United States)	Johnathan Motley	29	Hapoel Tel Aviv	(Israel)	25 June 2024	
27	SG	(Greece)	Tyler Dorsey	27	Olympiacos	(Greece)	30 June 2024	
2	PG	(Turkey)	Şehmus Hazer	25	Bahçeşehir Koleji	(Turkey)	1 July 2024	
9	C	(Greece)	Georgios Papagiannis	27	AS Monaco	(France)	9 July 2024	
17	PF	(France)	Amine Noua	27	Coviran Granada	(Spain)	9 July 2024	
–	F/C	(Croatia)	Luka Šamanić	24	Cibona	(Croatia)	13 September 2024	
51	C	(Serbia)	Boban Marjanović	36	Zhejiang Lions	(China)	23 December 2024	
77	SG	(Turkey)	Erten Gazi	27	Dinamo Sassari	(Italy)	25 December 2024	
9	PG	(United States)	Skylar Mays	27	Iowa Wolves	(United States)	31 January 2025	

== Pre-season and friendlies ==
=== Friendly matches ===
4 September 2024 Friendly	Fenerbahçe Beko (Turkish Basketball Federation)	75–77	(Turkish Basketball Federation) Karşıyaka Basket	Istanbul
19:00 TRT (UTC+3)	Scoring by quarter: 13–21, 20–18, 27–18, 15–20
	Pts: Melli 13	Boxscore	Pts: Webb 16	Arena: Metro Enerji Spor Salonu

11 September 2024 Friendly	Fenerbahçe Beko (Turkish Basketball Federation)	97–80	(Turkish Basketball Federation) Bahçeşehir Koleji	Istanbul
19:00 TRT (UTC+3)	Scoring by quarter: 23–21, 22–20, 33–24, 19–15
	Pts: Hayes-Davis 27; Rebs: Melli 10; Asts: Wilbekin 4	Boxscore	Pts: Cavanaugh 16; Rebs: Massinburg 6	Arena: Ülker Sports Arena

14 September 2024 Basketball Tournament Crete	Fenerbahçe Beko (Turkish Basketball Federation)	81–76	(Italian Basketball Federation) Olimpia Milano	Heraklion, Crete
18:00 TRT (UTC+3)	Scoring by quarter: 20–18, 23–24, 17–20, 21–14
		Boxscore		Arena: Heraklion Arena

15 September 2024 Basketball Tournament Crete	Fenerbahçe Beko (Turkish Basketball Federation)	70–73	(Hellenic Basketball Federation) Olympiacos	Heraklion, Crete
20:30 TRT (UTC+3)	Scoring by quarter: 15–14, 14–20, 21–23, 23–13
		Boxscore		Arena: Heraklion Arena

17 September 2024 Friendly	AEK (Hellenic Basketball Federation)	75–85	(Turkish Basketball Federation) Fenerbahçe Beko	Athens
19:30 TRT (UTC+3)	Scoring by quarter: 21–23, 18–22, 22–21, 14–20
		Boxscore		Arena: Ano Liosia Olympic Hall

20 September 2024 Friendly	Fenerbahçe Beko (Turkish Basketball Federation)	122–90	(Turkish Basketball Federation) Manisa Basket	Istanbul
19:00 TRT (UTC+3)	Scoring by quarter: 32–21, 26–28, 35–15, 29–26
	Pts: Wilbekin 17; Rebs: three players 5 Asts: Gudurić 5	Boxscore	Pts: Lee 26; Rebs: Pickett 4 Asts: Sonsırma 7	Arena: Metro Enerji Spor Salonu

24 September 2024 Friendly	Fenerbahçe Beko (Turkish Basketball Federation)	107–66	(Turkish Basketball Federation) Bursaspor Basketbol	Istanbul
18:00 TRT (UTC+3)	Scoring by quarter: 24–20, 27–14, 32–11, 24–21
	Pts: Baldwin 16	Boxscore		Arena: Ülker Sports and Event Hall

== Overview ==
Competition	First match	Last match	Starting round	Final position	Record							
Competition	First match	Last match	Starting round	Final position	Pld	W	D	L	PF	PA	PD	Win %
Basketball Super League	6 October 2024	25 June 2025	Round 1	Winners	41	36	0	5	3,624	3,294	+330	87.80
EuroLeague	4 October 2024	25 May 2025	Round 1	Winners	39	28	0	11	3,261	3,138	+123	71.79
Turkish Cup	11 February 2025	16 February 2025	Quarterfinals	Winners	3	3	0	0	280	211	+69	100.00
Presidential Cup	29 September 2024		Final	Runnersup	1	0	0	1	82	83	−1	0.00
Total					84	67	0	17	7,247	6,726	+521	79.76

Last updated: June 25, 2025
Source: Competitions

=== Presidential Cup ===
==== Matches ====
29 September 2024	Fenerbahçe Beko	82–83	Anadolu Efes	Istanbul
18:00 TRT (UTC +3)	Scoring by quarter: 20–24, 23–15, 14–25, 25–19
TRT Spor	Pts: Hayes-Davis 20; Rebs: Colson 6 Asts: Baldwin 4 PIR: Bonzie Colson 24	Boxscore	Pts: Bryant 21; Rebs: Bryant 8 Asts: Bryant, Thompson 5 PIR: Bryant 25	Arena: Basketbol Gelişim Merkezi; Referees: Yener Yılmaz, Kerem Baki, Ayşe Nur Yazıcıoğlu

=== Basketball Super League ===
==== League table ====
Pos	Team	Pld	W	L	PF	PA	PD	Pts	Qualification or relegation
1	Fenerbahçe Beko (C)	30	27	3	2650	2393	+257	57	Advance to playoffs
2	Beşiktaş Fibabanka	30	23	7	2697	2453	+244	53	Advance to playoffs
3	Anadolu Efes	30	23	7	2702	2369	+333	53	Advance to playoffs
4	Tofaş	30	19	11	2645	2575	+70	49	Advance to playoffs
5	Bahçeşehir Koleji	30	18	12	2501	2383	+118	48	Advance to playoffs

Source: Basketbol Süper Ligi
(C) Champions

==== Results summary ====
Overall						Home					Away				
Pld	W	L	PF	PA	PD	W	L	PF	PA	PD	W	L	PF	PA	PD
30	27	3	2650	2393	+257	14	1	1345	1186	+159	13	2	1305	1207	+98

Source: TBF.org.tr

==== Results by round ====
Round	1	2	3	4	5	6	7	8	9	10	11	12	13	14	15	16	17	18	19	20	21	22	23	24	25	26	27	28	29	30
Ground	H	A	H	A	H	A	H	A	A	H	A	H	A	H	A	A	H	A	H	A	H	A	H	H	A	H	A	H	A	H
Result	W	W	W	W	L	W	W	W	W	W	W	W	W	W	W	W	W	W	W	W	W	W	W	W	W	W	L	W	L	W
Position	4	3	2	2	3	3	3	3	2	1	1	1	1	1	1	1	1	1	1	1	1	1	1	1	1	1	1	1	1	1

Source: TBF.org.tr
A = Away; H = Home; W = Win; L = Loss

==== Matches ====
Note: All times are TRT (UTC+3) as listed by Turkish Basketball Federation.

6 October 2024 1	Fenerbahçe Beko	97–85	ONVO Büyükçekmece	Istanbul
20:30	Scoring by quarter: 16–18, 33–26, 16–18, 32–23
	Pts: Şanlı 21; Rebs: Hayes-Davis 8 Asts: Hall 6 PIR: Şanlı 29	Boxscore	Pts: Love 24; Rebs: Bruinsma, Franke 6 Asts: Love, Starks 5 PIR: Love 30	Arena: Ülker Sports Arena; Referees: Mehmet Şahin, Ziya Özorhon, Halil Erkoç

12 October 2024 2	Yalovaspor Basketbol	90–97(OT)	Fenerbahçe Beko	Yalova
18:00	Scoring by quarter: 26–25, 18–9, 21–23, 18–26, Overtime: 7–14
	Pts: Clark 23; Rebs: three players 5 Asts: Bayram 7 PIR: Krampelj 19	Boxscore	Pts: Hayes-Davis 22; Rebs: Colson 9 Asts: Žagars 7 PIR: Hayes-Davis 22	Arena: Yalova 90. Yıl Spor Salonu; Referees: Hüseyin Çelik, Polat Parlak, Mesut Öztürk

20 October 2024 3	Fenerbahçe Beko	95–78	Bursaspor Basketbol	Istanbul
20:30	Scoring by quarter: 25–19, 18–15, 27–16, 25–28
	Pts: Biberović 18; Rebs: Birch 12; Asts: Baldwin, Birch 8 PIR: Birch 28	Boxscore	Pts: Brown 19; Rebs: Grantham 7 Asts: Al 6 PIR: Brown 21	Arena: Ülker Sports Arena; Referees: Özlem Yalman, Ali Şakacı, Özge Şentürk Bayraktar

27 October 2024 4	Darüşşafaka Lassa	87–97	Fenerbahçe Beko	Istanbul
15:30	Scoring by quarter: 29–21, 21–27, 23–28, 14–21
	Pts: Moore 34; Rebs: Tinkle 7 Asts: Gach 5 PIR: Moore 37	Boxscore	Pts: Mahmutoğlu, Marjanović 16; Rebs: Birch 7 Asts: Marjanović, Žagars 4 PIR: Birch, Marjanović 21	Arena: Ayhan Şahenk Sports Hall; Referees: Yener Yılmaz, Ayşe Nur Yazıcıoğlu, Uğur Akyıldız

3 November 2024 5	Fenerbahçe Beko	66–75	Petkim Spor	Istanbul
18:00	Scoring by quarter: 9–22, 24–15, 18–20, 15–18
	Pts: Biberović 16; Rebs: Birch 9 Asts: Hall 5 PIR: Marjanović 17	Boxscore	Pts: Russell 20; Rebs: Şav 7 Asts: Russell 7 PIR: Russell 22	Arena: Ülker Sports Arena; Referees: Can Mavisu, Ziya Özorhon, Duhan Köyiçi

10 November 2024 6	Manisa Basket	82–90	Fenerbahçe Beko	Manisa
18:00	Scoring by quarter: 21–24, 20–24, 21–26, 20–16
	Pts: Echodas 35; Rebs: Echodas 10; Asts: Chiozza, Sonsırma 5 PIR: Echodas 41	Boxscore	Pts: Hayes-Davis 15; Rebs: Melli 8 Asts: Hall 8 PIR: Hayes-Davis 16	Arena: Muradiye Sports Hall

17 November 2024 7	Fenerbahçe Beko	86–72	Anadolu Efes	Istanbul
20:30	Scoring by quarter: 21–21, 28–14, 18–15, 19–22
	Pts: Žagars 19; Rebs: Melli 7 Asts: Mays, Žagars 4 PIR: Žagars 21	Boxscore	Pts: Bryant 23; Rebs: Oturu 8 Asts: Bryant 4 PIR: Bryant 23	Arena: Ülker Sports Arena; Referees: Emin Moğulkoç, Hüseyin Çelik, Uğur Akyıldız

1 December 2024 8	Mersin MSK	69–98	Fenerbahçe Beko	Mersin
18:00	Scoring by quarter: 16–27, 19–25, 16–20, 18–26
	Pts: Cruz 16; Rebs: Olaseni 7 Asts: three players 3 PIR: Cruz 18	Boxscore	Pts: Hayes-Davis 20; Rebs: Melli 12; Asts: Mays 5 PIR: Hayes-Davis 21	Arena: Servet Tazegül Spor Salonu; Referees: Kerem Baki, Kaan Büyükçil, Alper Özgök

8 December 2024 9	Türk Telekom	73–85	Fenerbahçe Beko	Ankara
18:00	Scoring by quarter: 20–19, 10–24, 23–24, 20–18
	Pts: four players 15; Rebs: Alexander 10; Asts: Angola 5 PIR: Angola 20	Boxscore	Pts: Biberović 21; Rebs: Melli 5 Asts: Gudurić 6 PIR: Biberović 19	Arena: Ankara Arena; Referees: Özlem Yalman, Orhan Çağrı Hekimoğlu, Berk Kurtulmuş

14 December 2024 10	Fenerbahçe Beko	90–88	Tofaş	Istanbul
20:30	Scoring by quarter: 24–21, 26–19, 24–26, 16–22
	Pts: Gudurić 18; Rebs: Melli 7 Asts: Baldwin, Gudurić 4 PIR: Gudurić 22	Boxscore	Pts: Pérez 31; Rebs: Bankston 10; Asts: Pérez 6 PIR: Pérez 30	Arena: Ülker Sports Arena; Referees: Zafer Yılmaz, Polat Parlak, Alper Gökçebel

22 December 2024 11	Bahçeşehir Koleji	70–82	Fenerbahçe Beko	Istanbul
20:30	Scoring by quarter: 16–23, 18–21, 15–19, 21–19
	Pts: Bouteille 23; Rebs: Simonović 7 Asts: Smith 9 PIR: Bouteille 23	Boxscore	Pts: Şanlı 16; Rebs: Melli 7 Asts: Mays 7 PIR: Şanlı 19	Arena: Sinan Erdem Spor Salonu; Referees: Kerem Baki, Mehmet Şahin, Mesut Öztürk

29 December 2024 12	Fenerbahçe Beko	91–72	Yukatel Merkezefendi	Istanbul
20:30	Scoring by quarter: 23–19, 25–18, 17–21, 26–14
	Pts: Biberović 20; Rebs: Biberović 9 Asts: Birsen 5 PIR: Biberović 27	Boxscore	Pts: Cook 25; Rebs: Cook 8 Asts: Tülüoğlu 7 PIR: Cook 29	Arena: Ülker Sports Arena; Referees: Fatih Arslanoğlu, Mehmet Serdar Ünal, Halil Erkoç

5 January 2025 13	Karşıyaka Basket	90–101	Fenerbahçe Beko	İzmir
20:30	Scoring by quarter: 21–18, 18–29, 21–33, 30–21
	Pts: Russell 40; Rebs: Russell 5 Asts: Russell 8 PIR: Russell 40	Boxscore	Pts: Mahmutoğlu 17; Rebs: Birch, Şanlı 6 Asts: Hall 5 PIR: Colson, Mahmutoğlu 17	Arena: Karşıyaka Arena; Attendance: 5,000; Referees: Yener Yılmaz, Can Mavisu, Musa Kazım Çetin

12 January 2025 14	Fenerbahçe Beko	90–79	Beşiktaş Fibabanka	Istanbul
20:30	Scoring by quarter: 21–23, 32–18, 13–24, 24–14
	Pts: Hayes-Davis 29; Rebs: Hall, Şanlı 5 Asts: Hall, Hayes-Davis 3 PIR: Hayes-Davis 22	Boxscore	Pts: Mathews 15; Rebs: Sleva 6 Asts: Allman, Needham 3 PIR: Sleva 15	Arena: Ülker Sports Arena; Referees: Ali Serkan Emlek, Mehmet Karabilecen, Nazlı Çisil Güngör

19 January 2025 15	Galatasaray	81–95	Fenerbahçe Beko	Zeytinburnu, Istanbul
20:30	Scoring by quarter: 25–24, 16–25, 17–21, 23–25
	Pts: Livingston II 20; Rebs: Delgado 9 Asts: Livingston II 5 PIR: Izundu 21	Boxscore	Pts: Şanlı 22; Rebs: Colson, Hayes-Davis 6 Asts: Hall 8 PIR: Gudurić 20	Arena: Basketbol Gelişim Merkezi; Referees: Kerem Baki, Alper Altuğ Köselerli, Batuhan Söylemezoğlu

26 January 2025 16	ONVO Büyükçekmece	73–78	Fenerbahçe Beko	Istanbul
20:30	Scoring by quarter: 19–11, 21–20, 12–21, 17–16
	Pts: Starks 21; Rebs: Sajus 12; Asts: Starks 5 PIR: Sajus 19	Boxscore	Pts: Hayes-Davis 21; Rebs: Melli 9 Asts: Gudurić, Hall 5 PIR: Hayes-Davis 17	Arena: Gazanfer Bilge Sports Hall; Referees: Kaan Büyükçil, Mehmet Serdar Ünal, Özge Şentürk Bayraktar

2 February 2025 17	Fenerbahçe Beko	100–94	Yalovaspor	Istanbul
13:00	Scoring by quarter: 27–25, 21–19, 27–23, 25–27
	Pts: Mahmutoğlu 27; Rebs: Hayes-Davis 5 Asts: three players 3 PIR: Mahmutoğlu 29	Boxscore	Pts: McConico 24; Rebs: Johnson 6 Asts: McConico 7 PIR: McConico 32	Arena: Ülker Sports Arena; Referees: Ziya Özorhon, Ahmet Tatlıcı, Tolga Akkuşoğlu

8 February 2025 18	Bursaspor Yörsan	97–98(OT)	Fenerbahçe Beko	Bursa
20:30	Scoring by quarter: 22–25, 22–18, 18–16, 26–29, Overtime: 9–10
	Pts: Mutaf 32; Rebs: Grantham, Sharma 10; Asts: Al 4 PIR: Mutaf 24	Boxscore	Pts: Hayes-Davis 20; Rebs: Melli 9 Asts: three players 4 PIR: Biberović, Hayes-Davis 21	Arena: Tofaş Spor Salonu; Referees: Mehmet Karabilecen, Ayşe Nur Yazıcıoğlu, Murat Ciner

1 March 2025 19	Fenerbahçe Beko	91–75	Darüşşafaka Lassa	Istanbul
20:30	Scoring by quarter: 25–17, 16–16, 21–21, 29–21
	Pts: Biberović 17; Rebs: Hayes-Davis 5 Asts: Gudurić 4 PIR: Biberović 19	Boxscore	Pts: Tinkle 16; Rebs: Moore 9 Asts: Tinkle 4 PIR: Tinkle 23	Arena: Ülker Sports Arena; Referees: Can Mavisu, Mehmet Serdar Ünal, Nazlı Çisil Güngör

9 March 2025 20	Petkim Spor	75–88	Fenerbahçe Beko	Aliağa, İzmir
15:30	Scoring by quarter: 15–24, 18–25, 20–11, 22–28
	Pts: Tyree 26; Rebs: Gültekin 7 Asts: Russell, Tyree 5 PIR: Tyree 26	Boxscore	Pts: Gudurić 16; Rebs: Şanlı 7 Asts: Gudurić 5 PIR: Gudurić 18	Arena: Enka Sport Hall; Referees: Zafer Yılmaz, Tolga Edis, Burak Yılmaz

15 March 2025 21	Fenerbahçe Beko	77–73	Manisa Basket	Istanbul
20:30	Scoring by quarter: 17–19, 16–18, 12–14, 32–22
	Pts: Žagars 21; Rebs: Gudurić 11; Asts: Žagars 5 PIR: Žagars 21	Boxscore	Pts: Lual-Acuil 22; Rebs: Sonsırma 7 Asts: Chiozza 10; PIR: Chiozza, Sonsırma 18	Arena: Ülker Sports Arena; Referees: Ali Serkan Emlek, Ayşe Nur Yazıcıoğlu, Berk Kurtulmuş

23 March 2025 22	Anadolu Efes	81–82	Fenerbahçe Beko	Istanbul
20:30	Scoring by quarter: 20–14, 23–25, 22–25, 16–16
	Pts: Bryant 20; Rebs: Oturu 9 Asts: Bryant, Larkin 6 PIR: Bryant 21	Boxscore	Pts: Colson 15; Rebs: four players 4 Asts: Gudurić, Žagars 5 PIR: Colson 16	Arena: Basketbol Gelişim Merkezi; Referees: Mehmet Şahin, Altuğ Köselerli, Kerem Yılmaz

30 March 2025 23	Fenerbahçe Beko	101–93	Mersin MSK	Istanbul
13:00	Scoring by quarter: 27–29, 22–20, 25–21, 27–23
	Pts: Şanlı 19; Rebs: Şanlı 10; Asts: Gudurić 7 PIR: Şanlı 27	Boxscore	Pts: Cruz 21; Rebs: Olaseni 7 Asts: Cobbs 11; PIR: Cruz 25	Arena: Ülker Sports Arena; Referees: Can Mavisu, Musa Kazım Çetin, Özge Şentürk Bayraktar

5 April 2025 24	Fenerbahçe Beko	94–85	Türk Telekom	Istanbul
13:00	Scoring by quarter: 19–20, 17–26, 32–16, 26–23
	Pts: Hayes-Davis 27; Rebs: Melli 8 Asts: Hayes-Davis 6 PIR: Hayes-Davis 32	Boxscore	Pts: Alexander 20; Rebs: Alexander 7 Asts: Brown 7 PIR: Alexander 21	Arena: Ülker Sports Arena; Referees: Mehmet Karabilecen, Fatih Arslanoğlu, Duhan Köyiçi

13 April 2025 25	Tofaş	88–89	Fenerbahçe Beko	Bursa
20:30	Scoring by quarter: 29–23, 24–15, 16–19, 19–32
	Pts: Reed 18; Rebs: Saybir 8 Asts: Pérez 9 PIR: Saybir 23	Boxscore	Pts: Baldwin IV 19; Rebs: Şanlı 7 Asts: Baldwin IV 7 PIR: Baldwin IV 22	Arena: Tofaş Nilüfer Spor Salonu; Referees: Ali Serkan Emlek, Alper Özgök, Ayşe Nur Yazıcıoğlu

18 April 2025 26	Fenerbahçe Beko	95–80	Bahçeşehir Koleji	Istanbul
20:30	Scoring by quarter: 20–20, 27–12, 23–29, 25–19
	Pts: McCollum 17; Rebs: Hayes-Davis 9 Asts: Baldwin IV 5 PIR: Hayes-Davis 19	Boxscore	Pts: Korkmaz 21; Rebs: Odiase 8 Asts: Cavanaugh 3 PIR: Odiase 21	Arena: Ülker Sports Arena; Referees: Kaan Büyükçil, Ziya Özorhan, Murat Ciner

2 May 2025 27	Yukatel Merkezefendi	79–63	Fenerbahçe Beko	Denizli
20:30	Scoring by quarter: 26–18, 21–19, 16–13, 16–13
	Pts: Arna 20; Rebs: Arna 10; Asts: Bleijenbergh 9 PIR: Arna 29	Boxscore	Pts: Mahmutoğlu 15; Rebs: Hall 6 Asts: Baldwin, Žagars 4 PIR: Hayes-Davis 10	Arena: Pamukkale University Arena; Referees: Kerem Baki, Ziya Özorhon, Musa Kazım Çetin

6 May 2025 28	Fenerbahçe Beko	78–67	Karşıyaka Basket	Istanbul
19:00	Scoring by quarter: 27–13, 19–20, 16–20, 16–14
	Pts: Gudurić, Žagars 12; Rebs: Şanlı 6 Asts: Gudurić 6 PIR: Gudurić 14	Boxscore	Pts: Yaşar 19; Rebs: Braimoh 5 Asts: Smith, Yaşar 3 PIR: Yaşar 16	Arena: Ülker Sports Arena; Referees: Özlem Yalman, Tolga Edis, Batuhan Söylemezoğlu

10 May 2025 29	Beşiktaş Fibabanka	72–62	Fenerbahçe Beko	Istanbul
18:00	Scoring by quarter: 17–7, 15–26, 23–20, 17–9
	Pts: Allman 21; Rebs: Terry 11; Asts: Allman 4 PIR: Allman 22	Boxscore	Pts: Hayes-Davis 20; Rebs: McCollum 8 Asts: Hall 4 PIR: Hayes-Davis 22	Arena: Akatlar Arena; Referees: Emin Moğulkoç, Polat Parlak, Ahmet Tatlıcı

17 May 2025 30	Fenerbahçe Beko	94–70	Galatasaray	Istanbul
18:00	Scoring by quarter: 23–16, 30–16, 22–20, 19–18
	Pts: Biberović 16; Rebs: Biberović 6 Asts: Gudurić 4 PIR: Biberović 20	Boxscore	Pts: Tuncer 15; Rebs: Wallace 9 Asts: Tuncer 4 PIR: Tuncer 15	Arena: Ülker Sports Arena; Referees: Ali Serkan Emlek, Zafer Yılmaz, Nazlı Çisil Güngör

===== Quarterfinals =====
Win Loss

29 May 2025 1	Fenerbahçe Beko	89–68 (Series: 1–0)	Türk Telekom	Istanbul
20:30 TRT (UTC+3)	Scoring by quarter: 19–13, 31–25, 23–9, 10–14
	Pts: Baldwin IV 14; Rebs: Şanlı 9 Asts: Gudurić, Melli 5 PIR: Melli 19	Boxscore	Pts: Angola 20; Rebs: Makoundou 7 Asts: Hanlan 9 PIR: Angola 21	Arena: Ülker Sports Arena; Referees: Yener Yılmaz, Hüseyin Çelik, Kaan Büyükçil

31 May 2025 2	Türk Telekom	85–77(OT) (Series: 1–1)	Fenerbahçe Beko	Ankara
20:30 TRT (UTC+3)	Scoring by quarter: 12–22, 22–17, 22–17, 16–16, Overtime: 13–5
	Pts: Angola 26; Rebs: Alexander 9 Asts: Hanlan 6 PIR: Angola 27	Boxscore	Pts: McCollum, Şanlı 12; Rebs: Hayes-Davis, Melli 6 Asts: Hayes-Davis 5 PIR: Şanlı 19	Arena: Ankara Arena; Referees: Ali Serkan Emlek, Mehmet Serdar Ünal, Polat Parlak

2 June 2025 3	Fenerbahçe Beko	101–94 (Series: 2–1)	Türk Telekom	Istanbul
20:30 TRT (UTC+3)	Scoring by quarter: 23–20, 28–31, 21–21, 29–22
	Pts: Gudurić 26; Rebs: Colson 6 Asts: Baldwin IV 5 PIR: Gudurić 26	Boxscore	Pts: Brown 24; Rebs: Alexander 7 Asts: Angola, Hanlan 6 PIR: Brown 25	Arena: Ülker Sports Arena; Referees: Mehmet Şahin, Alper Altuğ Köselerli, Uğur Akyıldız

===== Semifinals =====
Win Loss

5 June 2025 1	Fenerbahçe Beko	93–76 (Series: 1–0)	Bahçeşehir Koleji	Istanbul
20:30 TRT (UTC+3)	Scoring by quarter: 20–14, 22–22, 28–18, 23–22
	Pts: Hayes-Davis 21; Rebs: Melli 7 Asts: three players 4 PIR: Hayes-Davis 19	Boxscore	Pts: Odiase 16; Rebs: Smith 6 Asts: Sipahi 6 PIR: Odiase 15	Arena: Ülker Sports Arena; Referees: Emin Moğulkoç, Ziya Özorhon, Ayşe Nur Yazıcıoğlu

7 June 2025 2	Fenerbahçe Beko	91–89 (Series: 2–0)	Bahçeşehir Koleji	Istanbul
20:30 TRT (UTC+3)	Scoring by quarter: 25–22, 21–24, 22–21, 23–22
	Pts: Baldwin IV 18; Rebs: Melli 10; Asts: Baldwin IV 4 PIR: Hayes-Davis 18	Boxscore	Pts: Korkmaz, Sipahi 14; Rebs: Simonović 6 Asts: Sipahi 5 PIR: Simonović 18	Arena: Ülker Sports Arena; Referees: Özlem Yalman, Ali Şakacı, Alper Özgök

9 June 2025 3	Bahçeşehir Koleji	84–93 (Series: 0–3)	Fenerbahçe Beko	Istanbul
20:30 TRT (UTC+3)	Scoring by quarter: 14–25, 22–22, 23–22, 25–24
	Pts: Hazer 19; Rebs: Cavanaugh 7 Asts: Hazer 7 PIR: Hazer 24	Boxscore	Pts: Baldwin IV, Birsen 16; Rebs: Birch 10; Asts: Baldwin IV 5 PIR: Birsen 22	Arena: Sinan Erdem Spor Salonu; Referees: Ali Serkan Emlek, Kaan Büyükçil, Hüseyin Çelik

===== Finals =====
Win Loss

17 June 2025 1	Fenerbahçe Beko	94–76 (Series: 1–0)	Beşiktaş Fibabanka	Istanbul
20:30 TRT (UTC+3)	Scoring by quarter: 22–16, 28–18, 23–18, 21–24
	Pts: Birch 15; Rebs: Hayes-Davis 7 Asts: Gudurić 6 PIR: Birch 19	Boxscore	Pts: Needham 14; Rebs: Plavšić, Sleva 5 Asts: Allman, Needham 5 PIR: Needham 19	Arena: Ülker Sports Arena; Referees: Yener Yılmaz, Kaan Büyükçil, Polat Parlak

19 June 2025 2	Fenerbahçe Beko	84–76 (Series: 2–0)	Beşiktaş Fibabanka	Istanbul
20:30 TRT (UTC+3)	Scoring by quarter: 28–18, 20–16, 20–21, 16–21
	Pts: Birch 18; Rebs: Hayes-Davis 8 Asts: Hall 4 PIR: Birch 22	Boxscore	Pts: Mathews 20; Rebs: Sleva 6 Asts: Needham 7 PIR: Mathews 16	Arena: Ülker Sports Arena; Referees: Emin Moğulkoç, Ziya Özorhon, Tolga Akkuşoğlu

21 June 2025 3	Beşiktaş Fibabanka	98–77 (Series: 1–2)	Fenerbahçe Beko	Istanbul
20:30 TRT (UTC+3)	Scoring by quarter: 22–9, 28–22, 22–25, 26–21
	Pts: Mathews 25; Rebs: Arslan 7 Asts: Arslan 6 PIR: Arslan 32	Boxscore	Pts: Baldwin IV, Hall 14; Rebs: four players 4 Asts: Baldwin IV, Hall 3 PIR: Hall 16	Arena: Basketball Development Center; Referees: Serkan Emlek, Mehmet Karabilecen, Ayşe Nur Yazıcıoğlu

23 June 2025 4	Beşiktaş Fibabanka	87–91 (Series: 1–3)	Fenerbahçe Beko	Istanbul
20:30 TRT (UTC+3)	Scoring by quarter: 22–26, 23–23, 20–19, 22–23
	Pts: Mathews 26; Rebs: Terry 6 Asts: Allman 5 PIR: Mathews 21	Boxscore	Pts: Baldwin IV 24; Rebs: Birch 8 Asts: Hayes-Davis 5 PIR: Hayes-Davis 21	Arena: Basketball Development Center; Referees: Kerem Baki, Hüseyin Çelik, Serdar Ünal

25 June 2025 5	Fenerbahçe Beko	84–68 (Series: 4–1)	Beşiktaş Fibabanka	Istanbul
20:30 TRT (UTC+3)	Scoring by quarter: 21–18, 27–22, 21–14, 15–14
	Pts: Hayes-Davis 16; Rebs: Birsen, Melli 7 Asts: Baldwin IV 7 PIR: Baldwin IV 18	Boxscore	Pts: Mathews 19; Rebs: three players 4 Asts: Uğurlu 3 PIR: three players 12	Arena: Ülker Sports Arena; Referees: Zafer Yılmaz, Fatih Arslanoğlu, Ali Şakacı

=== EuroLeague ===
==== League table ====
The regular season began on 3 October 2024 and concluded on 11 April 2025. The 18 teams will play against each other home-and-away in a round-robin format over 34 rounds where only 10 teams will advance to the postseason. Moreover, the top six teams from regular season will receive a bye to the playoffs, while the teams placed from seventh to 10th will participate in the play-in to get the last two playoff spots. At the tail end of the standings, teams placed from 11th to 18th will be eliminated after the regular season.

Pos	Team	Pld	W	L	PF	PA	PD	Qualification
1	(Hellenic Basketball Federation) Olympiacos	34	24	10	2941	2770	+171	Qualification to playoffs
2	(Turkish Basketball Federation) Fenerbahçe Beko	34	23	11	2829	2760	+69	Qualification to playoffs
3	(Hellenic Basketball Federation) Panathinaikos AKTOR	34	22	12	2990	2843	+147	Qualification to playoffs
4	(French Federation of Basketball) Monaco	34	21	13	2913	2801	+112	Qualification to playoffs
5	(Spanish Basketball Federation) Barcelona	34	20	14	2966	2837	+129	Qualification to playoffs

Source: EuroLeague
Rules for classification: Regular season tiebreakers

==== Results summary ====
Overall						Home					Away				
Pld	W	L	PF	PA	PD	W	L	PF	PA	PD	W	L	PF	PA	PD
34	23	11	2829	2760	+69	12	5	1424	1373	+51	11	6	1405	1387	+18

Source: EuroLeague

==== Results by round ====
Round	1	2	3	4	5	6	7	8	9	10	11	12	13	14	15	16	17	18	19	20	21	22	23	24	25	26	27	28	29	30	31	32	33	34
Ground	H	A	H	A	H	H	H	A	H	A	A	H	A	A	H	A	A	A	H	H	A	H	A	H	A	H	A	A	H	A	H	H	H	A
Result	W	W	L	W	L	W	W	W	W	W	W	L	L	W	L	L	W	L	W	W	W	W	W	W	L	W	L	W	W	L	W	W	L	W
Position	2	3	9	5	9	6	4	2	2	1	1	2	3	2	4	5	5	6	5	4	2	2	2	2	2	2	2	2	2	2	2	1	2	2

Source: EuroLeague.net
A = Away; H = Home; W = Win; L = Loss

==== Matches ====
Note: All times, from 27 October 2024 to 31 March 2025, are CET (UTC+1); up to 27 October 2024 and from 31 March 2025, are CEST (UTC+2) as listed by EuroLeague.

4 October 2024 1	Fenerbahçe Beko (Turkish Basketball Federation)	82–71	(Hellenic Basketball Federation) Olympiacos	Istanbul
19:30	Scoring by quarter: 17–13, 15–23, 25–20, 25–15
	Pts: Baldwin IV 19; Rebs: Colson 9 Asts: Baldwin IV 7 PIR: Baldwin IV 26	Boxscore	Pts: Wright 15; Rebs: Wright 7 Asts: Walkup 5 PIR: Wright 17	Arena: Ülker Sports and Event Hall; Attendance: 10,113; Referees: Ilija Belošević, Uroš Nikolić, Jordi Aliaga

10 October 2024 2	Anadolu Efes (Turkish Basketball Federation)	78–83	(Turkish Basketball Federation) Fenerbahçe Beko	Istanbul
19:30	Scoring by quarter: 21–27, 16–19, 14–14, 27–23
	Pts: Oturu 21; Rebs: Willis 7 Asts: Larkin 6 PIR: Oturu 28	Boxscore	Pts: Colson 16; Rebs: Birch 8 Asts: Hayes-Davis 5 PIR: Birch 15	Arena: Sinan Erdem Dome; Attendance: 8,926; Referees: Miguel Ángel Pérez, Damir Javor, Ioannis Foufis

15 October 2024 3	Fenerbahçe Beko (Turkish Basketball Federation)	57–76	(Basketball Federation of Serbia) Crvena zvezda Meridianbet	Istanbul
19:45	Scoring by quarter: 12–26, 19–12, 11–16, 15–22
	Pts: Hayes-Davis 20; Rebs: Hayes-Davis 8 Asts: Baldwin IV 5 PIR: Hayes-Davis 25	Boxscore	Pts: Bolomboy 18; Rebs: Bolomboy 11; Asts: Miller-McIntyre 8 PIR: Bolomboy 25	Arena: Ülker Sports and Event Hall; Attendance: 9,653; Referees: Piotr Pastusiak, Carlos Cortes, Thomas Bissuel

17 October 2024 4	ALBA Berlin (German Basketball Federation)	71–78	(Turkish Basketball Federation) Fenerbahçe Beko	Berlin
19:30	Scoring by quarter: 16–15, 15–23, 16–20, 24–20
	Pts: Spagnolo, Hermannsson 13; Rebs: Williams 8 Asts: Hermannsson 5 PIR: Spagnolo 17	Boxscore	Pts: Hayes-Davis 14; Rebs: Marjanović 6 Asts: Baldwin IV 4 PIR: Melli 19	Arena: Uber Arena; Attendance: 11,847; Referees: Sasa Pukl, Alberto Baena, Denis Hadzic

25 October 2024 5	Fenerbahçe Beko (Turkish Basketball Federation)	76–81	(Hellenic Basketball Federation) Panathinaikos	Istanbul
19:45	Scoring by quarter: 15–21, 20–25, 19–16, 22–19
	Pts: Biberović 16; Rebs: Biberović, Colson 6 Asts: Baldwin IV 4 PIR: Biberović 18	Boxscore	Pts: Nunn 15; Rebs: Yurtseven 6 Asts: Brown 5 PIR: Lessort 22	Arena: Ülker Sports and Event Hall; Attendance: 12,672; Referees: Carlos Peruga, Milan Nedović, Artūras Šukys

29 October 2024 6	Fenerbahçe Beko (Turkish Basketball Federation)	84–82	(Israeli Basketball Association) Maccabi Playtika Tel Aviv	Kaunas (Note: The Turkish Airlines EuroLeague Round 6 game between Fenerbahce BEKO Istanbul and Maccabi Playtika Tel Aviv will be played at Zalgirio Arena in Kaunas, Lithuania. The game was played on Tuesday, October 29 at 20:30 local time, 18:30 GMT. This decision has been taken considering Turkish and Israel government recommendations.)
19:30	Scoring by quarter: 16–21, 22–19, 20–27, 26–15
	Pts: Hayes-Davis 20; Rebs: Biberović 6 Asts: Hall 9 PIR: Hall 21	Boxscore	Pts: Hoard 20; Rebs: Sorkin 9 Asts: Jokubaitis 7 PIR: Hoard 21	Arena: Žalgiris Arena; Attendance: 1,570; Referees: Miguel Angel Perez, Michele Rossi, Luka Kardum

1 November 2024 7	Fenerbahçe Beko (Turkish Basketball Federation)	89–72	(Basketball Federation of Serbia) Partizan Mozzart Bet	Istanbul
18:45	Scoring by quarter: 22–15, 22–16, 23–22, 22–19
	Pts: Hayes-Davis 24; Rebs: three players 5 Asts: Baldwin IV 8 PIR: Hayes-Davis 23	Boxscore	Pts: Ntilikina 14; Rebs: Pokuševski 5 Asts: three players 3 PIR: Pokuševski 14	Arena: Ülker Sports and Event Hall; Attendance: 12,712; Referees: Gytis Vilius, Jordi Aliaga, Alberto Baena

8 November 2024 8	LDLC ASVEL (French Federation of Basketball)	73–77	(Turkish Basketball Federation) Fenerbahçe Beko	Villeurbanne, Lyon
20:00	Scoring by quarter: 19–15, 17–18, 16–18, 21–26
	Pts: De Colo 18; Rebs: Black, Sako 6 Asts: De Colo 11; PIR: De Colo 29	Boxscore	Pts: Hayes-Davis 25; Rebs: Şanlı 8 Asts: Gudurić, Hall 5 PIR: Hayes-Davis 24	Arena: LDLC Arena; Attendance: 8,752; Referees: Tomislav Hordov, Milivoje Jovčić, Manuel Attard

12 November 2024 9	Fenerbahçe Beko (Turkish Basketball Federation)	87–76	(German Basketball Federation) Bayern Munich	Istanbul
18:45	Scoring by quarter: 13–21, 22–9, 32–28, 20–18
	Pts: Hayes-Davis 25; Rebs: Hayes-Davis, Melli 8 Asts: Hall 7 PIR: Hayes-Davis 28	Boxscore	Pts: Edwards 24; Rebs: Voigtmann, Weiler-Babb 6 Asts: Edwards, Weiler-Babb 5 PIR: Booker 27	Arena: Ülker Sports and Event Hall; Attendance: 12,416; Referees: Emilio Pérez, Joseph Bissang, Guido Giovannetti

15 November 2024 10	Žalgiris (Lithuanian Basketball Federation)	65–72	(Turkish Basketball Federation) Fenerbahçe Beko	Kaunas
19:00	Scoring by quarter: 21–17, 5–26, 21–9, 18–20
	Pts: Walker 19; Rebs: Butkevičius 8 Asts: Francisco 3 PIR: Walker 21	Boxscore	Pts: Hayes-Davis 18; Rebs: Hayes-Davis 11; Asts: Žagars, Gudurić 3 PIR: Hayes-Davis 23	Arena: Žalgiris Arena; Attendance: 15,325; Referees: Juan Carlo Garcia, Josip Radovkovic, Noam Gordon

20 November 2024 11	Virtus Segafredo Bologna (Italian Basketball Federation)	82–86	(Turkish Basketball Federation) Fenerbahçe Beko	Bologna
20:30	Scoring by quarter: 22–23, 16–14, 23–19, 21–30
	Pts: Shengelia 23; Rebs: Clyburn, Shengelia 6 Asts: Cordinier 5 PIR: Shengelia 25	Boxscore	Pts: Gudurić 21; Rebs: Hayes-Davis 8 Asts: Mays, Biberović, Gudurić 3 PIR: Hayes-Davis 25	Arena: Segafredo Arena; Attendance: 7,462; Referees: Miguel Angel Perez, Uroš Nikolić, Marcin Kowalski

29 November 2024 12	Fenerbahçe Beko (Turkish Basketball Federation)	85–91	(Italian Basketball Federation) EA7 Emporio Armani Milan	Istanbul
18:45	Scoring by quarter: 19–24, 18–17, 26–25, 22–25
	Pts: Baldwin 19; Rebs: Şanlı 6 Asts: Baldwin 4 PIR: Žagars 21	Boxscore	Pts: Mirotić 29; Rebs: Mirotić 9 Asts: Mannion 6 PIR: Mirotić 38	Arena: Ülker Sports and Event Hall; Attendance: 12,041; Referees: Sreten Radović, Emilio Pérez, Luka Kardum

3 December 2024 13	Baskonia (Spanish Basketball Federation)	88–76	(Turkish Basketball Federation) Fenerbahçe Beko	Vitoria-Gasteiz
20:30	Scoring by quarter: 26–12, 19–13, 18–22, 25–29
	Pts: Howard 17; Rebs: Hall 9 Asts: Forrest 8 PIR: Sedekerskis, Hall 23	Boxscore	Pts: Biberović, Žagars 13; Rebs: Hayes-Davis 7 Asts: Şanlı, Gudurić Colson 1 PIR: Žagars 15	Arena: Buesa Arena; Attendance: 8,412; Referees: Ilija Belošević, Milivoje Jovcic, Michele Rossi

5 December 2024 14	Real Madrid (Spanish Basketball Federation)	70–82	(Turkish Basketball Federation) Fenerbahçe Beko	Madrid
20:45	Scoring by quarter: 20–12, 11–25, 16–23, 23–22
	Pts: Campazzo 14; Rebs: Tavares 7 Asts: Campazzo 6 PIR: Campazzo 19	Boxscore	Pts: Hayes-Davis 33; Rebs: Birch 7 Asts: Baldwin IV 5 PIR: Hayes-Davis 30	Arena: WiZink Center; Attendance: 9,633; Referees: Robert Lottermoser, Igor Dragojevic, Maxime Boubert

12 December 2024 15	Fenerbahçe Beko (Turkish Basketball Federation)	69–99	(French Federation of Basketball) AS Monaco Basket	Istanbul
18:45	Scoring by quarter: 19–17, 19–26, 16–29, 15–27
	Pts: Hayes-Davis 28; Rebs: Birch 9 Asts: Baldwin 3 PIR: Hayes-Davis 30	Boxscore	Pts: James 21; Rebs: Motiejunas 11; Asts: James, Okobo 5 PIR: Okobo 23	Arena: Ülker Sports and Event Hall; Attendance: 11,155; Referees: Juan Carlos Garcia, Olegs Latisevs, Josip Radojković

17 December 2024 16	Barcelona (Spanish Basketball Federation)	90–63	(Turkish Basketball Federation) Fenerbahçe Beko	Barcelona
20:30	Scoring by quarter: 20–12, 24–25, 21–16, 25–10
	Pts: Punter 25; Rebs: Parker 7 Asts: Punter, Satoranský 5 PIR: Punter 32	Boxscore	Pts: Colson 15; Rebs: Birch 6 Asts: three players 2 PIR: Birch, Colson 22	Arena: Palau Blaugrana; Attendance: 5,974; Referees: Tomislav Hordov, Rain Peerandi, Steve Bittner

27 December 2024 18	Partizan Mozzart Bet (Basketball Federation of Serbia)	90–81	(Turkish Basketball Federation) Fenerbahçe Beko	Belgrade
20:30	Scoring by quarter: 25–21, 22–17, 18–19, 25–24
	Pts: Washington 27; Rebs: Mike 7 Asts: Jones 5 PIR: Washington 27	Boxscore	Pts: Hayes-Davis 19; Rebs: Colson 4 Asts: Hall 8 PIR: Hayes-Davis 26	Arena: Belgrade Arena; Attendance: 20,073; Referees: Mehdi Difallah, Piotr Pastusiak, Robert Vyklicky

3 January 2025 19	Fenerbahçe Beko (Turkish Basketball Federation)	84–76	(Turkish Basketball Federation) Anadolu Efes	Istanbul
18:45	Scoring by quarter: 24–24, 19–16, 21–16, 20–20
	Pts: Biberović, Gudurić 17; Rebs: Gudurić 7 Asts: Gudurić 7 PIR: Gudurić 30	Boxscore	Pts: Bryant 19; Rebs: Poirier 6 Asts: Thompson 3 PIR: Bryant 20	Arena: Ülker Sports and Event Hall; Attendance: 11,417; Referees: Tomislav Hordov, Arturas Sukys, Milos Koljensic

9 January 2025 20	Fenerbahçe Beko (Turkish Basketball Federation)	90–73	(German Basketball Federation) ALBA Berlin	Istanbul
18:45	Scoring by quarter: 16–11, 21–23, 24–26, 29–13
	Pts: Şanlı 18; Rebs: Hayes-Davis 6 Asts: Hall 5 PIR: Şanlı 23	Boxscore	Pts: Procida 14; Rebs: McCormack 8 Asts: Hermannsson 3 PIR: Wetzell 14	Arena: Ülker Sports and Event Hall; Attendance: 7,648; Referees: Carmelo Paternico, Joseph Bissang, Saso Petek

15 January 2025 21	Crvena zvezda Meridianbet (Basketball Federation of Serbia)	91–96	(Turkish Basketball Federation) Fenerbahçe Beko	Belgrade
20:00	Scoring by quarter: 24–21, 19–28, 18–21, 30–26
	Pts: Miller-McIntyre 23; Rebs: Kalinić 5 Asts: Miller-McIntyre, dos Santos 3 PIR: Miller-McIntyre 22	Boxscore	Pts: Hayes-Davis 27; Rebs: Melli 7 Asts: Gudurić 8 PIR: Hayes-Davis 27	Arena: Belgrade Arena; Attendance: 20,989; Referees: Juan Carlos Garcia, Rain Peerandi, Thomas Bissuel

17 January 2025 22	Fenerbahçe Beko (Turkish Basketball Federation)	98–86	(Lithuanian Basketball Federation) Žalgiris	Istanbul
18:45	Scoring by quarter: 17–20, 17–27, 28–21, 36–18
	Pts: Hayes-Davis 21; Rebs: Hayes-Davis 6 Asts: Hall 4 PIR: Hayes-Davis, Gudurić 24	Boxscore	Pts: Smailagić 24; Rebs: Smailagić 6 Asts: Walker IV 6 PIR: Smailagić 25	Arena: Ülker Sports and Event Hall; Attendance: 9,531; Referees: Ilija Belošević, Carlos Cortes, Igor Dragojevic

24 January 2025 23	Olympiacos (Hellenic Basketball Federation)	77–87	(Turkish Basketball Federation) Fenerbahçe Beko	Piraeus
20:15	Scoring by quarter: 21–17, 19–26, 19–26, 18–18
	Pts: Fournier 21; Rebs: Williams-Goss 4 Asts: Williams-Goss 6 PIR: Vezenkov 24	Boxscore	Pts: Gudurić 21; Rebs: Melli, Şanlı, Biberović 5 Asts: Biberović 6 PIR: Gudurić 25	Arena: Peace and Friendship Stadium; Attendance: 12,232; Referees: Sretan Radovic, Emilio Perez, Robert Vyklicky

31 January 2025 24	Fenerbahçe Beko (Turkish Basketball Federation)	95–81	(Italian Basketball Federation) Virtus Segafredo Bologna	Istanbul
18:30	Scoring by quarter: 22–13, 24–24, 23–17, 26–27
	Pts: Gudurić 17; Rebs: Colson 5 Asts: McCollum, Devon Hall 3 PIR: Gudurić 20	Boxscore	Pts: Shengelia 35; Rebs: Shengelia 5 Asts: Cordinier 5 PIR: Shengelia 39	Arena: Ülker Sports and Event Hall; Attendance: 11,065; Referees: Miguel Angel Perez, Jakub Zamojski, Alberto Baena

4 February 2025 25	Panathinaikos (Hellenic Basketball Federation)	91–90	(Turkish Basketball Federation) Fenerbahçe Beko	Marousi, Athens
20:15	Scoring by quarter: 24–24, 17–16, 20–24, 30–26
	Pts: Sloukas 23; Rebs: Hernangómez 8 Asts: Nunn 7 PIR: Sloukas 28	Boxscore	Pts: Hayes-Davis 21; Rebs: Hayes-Davis 9 Asts: Hall 8 PIR: Hayes-Davis 26	Arena: O.A.K.A. Attendance: 18,940; Referees: Juan Carlos Garcia, Rain Peerandi, Kristaps Konstantinovs

6 February 2025 26	Fenerbahçe Beko (Turkish Basketball Federation)	78–67	(Spanish Basketball Federation) Real Madrid	Istanbul
18:30	Scoring by quarter: 16–16, 24–12, 18–19, 20–20
	Pts: Hayes-Davis 20; Rebs: Hayes-Davis 7 Asts: Hall 6 PIR: Hayes-Davis 23	Boxscore	Pts: Campazzo 11; Rebs: Abalde 6 Asts: Campazzo 3 PIR: Campazzo, Tavares, Feliz 12	Arena: Ülker Sports and Event Hall; Attendance: 12,578; Referees: Mehdi Difallah, Oļegs Latiševs, Guido Giovannetti

27 February 2025 27	Maccabi Playtika Tel Aviv (Israeli Basketball Association)	94–76	(Turkish Basketball Federation) Fenerbahçe Beko	Belgrade (Note: Euroleague Basketball has approved alternative venues for Israeli teams to play their 2024-25 home games should the impossibility of hosting games in Israel due to the current situation persist. Maccabi Playtika Tel Aviv has proposed hosting all its home games at Aleksandar Nikolic Hall in Serbia's capital, Belgrade.)
21:00	Scoring by quarter: 25–21, 16–25, 31–17, 22–13
	Pts: Sorkin 21; Rebs: DiBartolomeo 8 Asts: Clark III 10; PIR: Sorkin 23	Boxscore	Pts: Baldwin IV, Hayes-Davis 12; Rebs: Colson 7 Asts: Hall 5 PIR: Colson 18	Arena: Aleksandar Nikolic Hall; Attendance: 150; Referees: Emilio Perez, Uroš Nikolić, Steve Bittner

3 March 2025 17	Paris Basketball (French Federation of Basketball)	83–87	(Turkish Basketball Federation) Fenerbahçe Beko	Paris
20:30	Scoring by quarter: 26–16, 19–21, 15–26, 23–24
	Pts: Shorts II 22; Rebs: Hayes 7 Asts: Shorts II 8 PIR: Shorts II 28	Boxscore	Pts: Gudurić 19; Rebs: Birch 7 Asts: Baldwin IV 8 PIR: Gudurić 16	Arena: Adidas Arena; Attendance: 8,037; Referees: Ilija Belošević, Jordi Aliaga, Sašo Petek
Note: Originally scheduled to be played on 19 December 2024, the game was postponed due to the home team having insufficient number of eligible players at that time.

6 March 2025 28	EA7 Emporio Armani Milan (Italian Basketball Federation)	76–100	(Turkish Basketball Federation) Fenerbahçe Beko	Milan
20:30	Scoring by quarter: 19–24, 18–29, 19–23, 20–24
	Pts: Shields 17; Rebs: Mirotić 6 Asts: Mannion 3 PIR: Shields, Mirotić 15	Boxscore	Pts: McCollum 18; Rebs: Bango 5 Asts: Gudurić 4 PIR: McCollum 20	Arena: Unipol Forum; Attendance: 10,699; Referees: Miguel Angel Perez, Milivoje Jovcic, Luka Kardum

13 March 2025 29	Fenerbahçe Beko (Turkish Basketball Federation)	92–82	(French Federation of Basketball) LDLC ASVEL	Istanbul
18:45	Scoring by quarter: 30–23, 19–21, 21–16, 22–22
	Pts: Baldwin IV 15; Rebs: Hayes-Davis 6 Asts: Baldwin IV 6 PIR: Baldwin IV 20	Boxscore	Pts: Lauvergne 20; Rebs: Lauvergne 9 Asts: de Colo 11; PIR: de Colo 27	Arena: Ülker Sports and Event Hall; Attendance: 8,315; Referees: Robert Lottermoser, Milan Nedovic, Uros Obrknezevic

20 March 2025 30	AS Monaco Basket (French Federation of Basketball)	91–82	(Turkish Basketball Federation) Fenerbahçe Beko	Fontvieille, Monaco
19:00	Scoring by quarter: 26–28, 21–15, 16–15, 28–24
	Pts: James 29; Rebs: Theis 7 Asts: James, Okobo; PIR: James 26	Boxscore	Pts: McCollum 24; Rebs: Hayes-Davis 7 Asts: Gudurić 6 PIR: Gudurić 24	Arena: Salle Gaston Médecin; Attendance: 4,156; Referees: Carlos Peruga, Piotr Pastusiak, Milos Koljensic

25 March 2025 31	Fenerbahçe Beko (Turkish Basketball Federation)	101–100	(French Federation of Basketball) Paris Basketball	Istanbul
18:45	Scoring by quarter: 17–24, 27–27, 27–33, 30–16
	Pts: Gudurić 25; Rebs: McCollum 5 Asts: Baldwin IV 5 PIR: McCollum 24	Boxscore	Pts: Shorts II, Hifi 19; Rebs: Ward, Jantunen 8 Asts: Shorts II 10; PIR: three players 19	Arena: Ülker Sports and Event Hall; Attendance: 9,217; Referees: Miguel Angel Perez, Ioannis Foufis, Alberto Baena

28 March 2025 32	Fenerbahçe Beko (Turkish Basketball Federation)	82–77	(Spanish Basketball Federation) Baskonia	Istanbul
18:45	Scoring by quarter: 19–13, 27–19, 26–27, 10–18
	Pts: Hayes-Davis 17; Rebs: Melli 9 Asts: Baldwin IV 5 PIR: Hayes-Davis 22	Boxscore	Pts: Rogkavopoulos 14; Rebs: Sedekerskis 6 Asts: Forrest 12; PIR: Forrest 23	Arena: Ülker Sports and Event Hall; Attendance: 8,315; Referees: Mehdi Difallah, Uros Nikolic, Vasiliki Tsaroucha

2 April 2025 33	Fenerbahçe Beko (Turkish Basketball Federation)	75–83	(Spanish Basketball Federation) Barcelona	Istanbul
19:45	Scoring by quarter: 23–21, 27–18, 16–23, 9–21
	Pts: Hayes-Davis 20; Rebs: Hayes-Davis 8 Asts: Gudurić 4 PIR: Hayes-Davis 23	Boxscore	Pts: Parker 24; Rebs: Parra 12; Asts: Satoranský 7 PIR: Parker 27	Arena: Ülker Sports and Event Hall; Attendance: 10,431; Referees: Sreten Radović, Milan Nedović, Saulius Račys

10 April 2025 34	Bayern Munich (German Basketball Federation)	77–89	(Turkish Basketball Federation) Fenerbahçe Beko	Munich
20:00	Scoring by quarter: 13–28, 18–18, 21–22, 25–21
	Pts: Edwards 26; Rebs: Napier 6 Asts: Napier 4 PIR: Edwards 23	Boxscore	Pts: Hayes-Davis 24; Rebs: Melli 8 Asts: Hayes-Davis 5 PIR: Hayes-Davis 32	Arena: SAP Garden; Attendance: 11,200; Referees: Damir Javor, Carlos Cortes, Luka Kardum

=== EuroLeague Playoffs ===
==== Quarterfinals ====
Win Loss

22 April 2025 Game 1	Fenerbahçe Beko (Turkish Basketball Federation)	83–78 (Series: 1–0)	(French Federation of Basketball) Paris Basketball	Istanbul
20:45 TRT	Scoring by quarter: 18–22, 31–20, 14–20, 20–16
	Pts: Baldwin IV 15; Rebs: Hayes-Davis 6 Asts: Hall 4 PIR: Hall 17	Boxscore	Pts: Hifi 21; Rebs: Ward, Jantunen 5 Asts: Shorts II 7 PIR: Ward 23	Arena: Ülker Sports and Event Hall; Attendance: 12,780; Referees: Juan Carlos Garcia, Carlos Cortes, Kristaps Konstantinovs

24 April 2025 Game 2	Fenerbahçe Beko (Turkish Basketball Federation)	89–72 (Series: 2–0)	(French Federation of Basketball) Paris Basketball	Istanbul
20:45 TRT	Scoring by quarter: 29–20, 32–18, 15–19, 13–15
	Pts: Biberović 20; Rebs: Hayes-Davis 7 Asts: Gudurić 5 PIR: Hayes-Davis 26	Boxscore	Pts: Shorts II 18; Rebs: Jantunen, Cavalière 6 Asts: Shorts II 4 PIR: Shorts II 17	Arena: Ülker Sports and Event Hall; Attendance: 12,813; Referees: Miguel Angel Perez, Emilio Perez, Ioannis Foufis

29 April 2025 Game 3	Paris Basketball (French Federation of Basketball)	88–98(OT) (Series: 0–3)	(Turkish Basketball Federation) Fenerbahçe Beko	Paris
20:30 CEST	Scoring by quarter: 18–20, 22–26, 21–17, 19–17, Overtime: 8–18
	Pts: Shorts II 29; Rebs: Hayes 8 Asts: Shorts II 4 PIR: Hayes 17	Boxscore	Pts: Biberović 21; Rebs: Birch 9 Asts: Baldwin IV 6 PIR: Hayes-Davis 24	Arena: Adidas Arena; Attendance: 7,424; Referees: Carlos Peruga, Milan Nedovic, Jordi Aliaga

=== Final Four ===
==== Semifinal ====
23 May 2025	Fenerbahçe Beko (Turkish Basketball Federation)	82–76	(Hellenic Basketball Federation) Panathinaikos	Abu Dhabi, United Arab Emirates
17:00 CEST	Scoring by quarter: 22–14, 16–19, 17–15, 27–28
	Pts: Hall 18; Rebs: Melli 6 Asts: Baldwin IV, Hayes-Davis 5 PIR: Hall 18	Boxscore	Pts: Osman 22; Rebs: Osman 6 Asts: Grant 4 PIR: Grant 17	Arena: Etihad Arena; Attendance: 10,218; Referees: Carlos Peruga, Robert Lottermoser, Mehdi Difallah

==== Final ====
25 May 2025	Monaco (French Federation of Basketball)	70–81	(Turkish Basketball Federation) Fenerbahçe Beko	Abu Dhabi, United Arab Emirates
19:00 CEST	Scoring by quarter: 20–18, 13–17, 18–19, 19–27
	Pts: Diallo 19; Rebs: Theis 8 Asts: Okobo 5 PIR: Diallo 13	Boxscore	Pts: Hayes-Davis 23; Rebs: Hayes-Davis 9 Asts: Baldwin 3 PIR: Hayes-Davis 30	Arena: Etihad Arena; Referees: Carlos Peruga, Robert Lottermoser, Milan Nedović

=== Turkish Basketball Cup ===
==== Quarterfinals ====
Win Loss

11 February 2025 QF	Fenerbahçe Beko	87–56	Bahçeşehir Koleji	Istanbul
20:30 TRT (UTC+3)	Scoring by quarter: 22–7, 27–18, 21–13, 17–18
TRT Spor Yıldız	Pts: Hayes-Davis 14; Rebs: Biberović, Melli 5 Asts: Baldwin IV 7 PIR: Hayes-Davis 17	Boxscore	Pts: Odiase 15; Rebs: Bouteille, Simonović 7 Asts: Sipahi 5 PIR: Simonović 15	Arena: Ülker Sports Arena; Referees: Can Mavisu, Kaan Büyükçil, Alper Özgök

==== Semifinals ====
Win Loss

14 February 2025 SF	Fenerbahçe Beko	89–74	Galatasaray	Şanlıurfa
20:30 TRT (UTC+3)	Scoring by quarter: 22–16, 20–19, 22–11, 25–28
TRT Spor Yıldız	Pts: Hayes-Davis 18; Rebs: Hall 5 Asts: Baldwin IV 5 PIR: Hayes-Davis 20	Boxscore	Pts: Cummings 22; Rebs: Delgado 9 Asts: Tuncer 5 PIR: Cummings, Tuncer 18	Arena: 11 Nisan Spor Salonu; Referees: Mehmet Şahin, Hüseyin Çelik, Uğur Akyıldız

==== Final ====
Win Loss

16 February 2025 F	Fenerbahçe Beko	104–81	Beşiktaş Fibabanka	Şanlıurfa
16:00 TRT (UTC +3)	Scoring by quarter: 27–19, 31–21, 24–20, 22–21
TRT Spor Yıldız	Pts: Hayes-Davis 22; Rebs: Hayes-Davis 9 Asts: Biberović 5 PIR: Hayes-Davis 27	Boxscore	Pts: Needham 20; Rebs: Terry 6 Asts: Needham 5 PIR: Needham 25	Arena: 11 Nisan Spor Salonu; Referees: Mehmet Şahin, Kerem Baki, Hüseyin Çelik

== Statistics ==
Legend
GP	Games played	GS	Games started	MPG	Minutes per game
FG%	Field-goal percentage	3FG%	3-point field-goal percentage	FT%	Free-throw percentage
RPG	Rebounds per game	APG	Assists per game	SPG	Steals per game
BPG	Blocks per game	PPG	Points per game	PIR	PIR per game

Player	Left during season

=== Basketbol Süper Ligi ===
Player	GP	GS	MPG	2FG%	3FG%	FT%	RPG	APG	SPG	BPG	PPG	PIR
Wade Baldwin IV	27	2	21:00	.500	.333	.721	2.6	3.8	0.6	0.1	11.2	10.6
Faruk Biberović	5	0	1:29	.000	—	—	0.4	0.2	0	0	0	0.2
Tarik Biberović	29	11	20:49	.462	.407	.951	3.5	1.7	0.5	0.1	9.7	9.7
Khem Birch	28	17	16:13	.612	—	.865	4.1	0.8	0.5	0.6	5.9	9.4
Metecan Birsen	34	6	15:27	.642	.375	.714	2.8	1.0	0.3	0	5.8	7.0
Bonzie Colson	25	16	18:40	.585	.424	.710	3.9	1.0	0.8	0.2	8.3	10.4
Mert Emre Ekşioğlu	31	13	7:33	.357	.300	.727	0.8	0.1	0.1	0	1.5	1.2
Marko Gudurić	36	29	20:00	.628	.389	.839	2.4	3.6	0.7	0	9.5	11.0
Devon Hall	35	13	22:03	.432	.351	.789	3.0	2.9	0.5	0.1	7.9	8.8
Nigel Hayes-Davis	36	29	25:09	.559	.326	.846	4.4	2.0	0.9	0.3	13.1	14.1
Melih Mahmutoğlu	39	10	19:37	.584	.466	.800	1.3	0.7	0.2	0	9.6	7.9
Errick McCollum	22	12	17:40	.500	.259	.811	1.9	1.1	0.7	0.1	7.7	6.3
Nicolò Melli	35	6	18:34	.552	.319	.627	5.5	0.4	0.9	0.4	6.0	10.0
Yiğit Hamza Mestoğlu	6	0	3:38	.250	1.000	1.000	0.7	0.2	0	0	1.7	1.8
Sertaç Şanlı	29	18	17:36	.667	.377	.867	4.2	1.0	0.2	0.4	8.3	11.0
Scottie Wilbekin	0	0	0:00	.000	.000	.000	0	0	0	0	0	0
Artūrs Žagars	22	16	17:37	.563	.368	.833	1.3	2.9	0.9	0.1	8.4	8.5
Ömer Ege Ziyaettin	1	0	2:21	.000	—	1.000	0	0	0	0	2.0	0
Erten Gazi	5	1	4:55	.333	.000	—	1.0	0	0.2	0	0.4	0.8
Boban Marjanović	7	4	12:20	.677	.333	.846	4.9	1.6	0.4	0.4	10.1	14.1
Skylar Mays	10	2	17:57	.537	.250	.857	3.1	2.9	0.7	0.1	7.4	9.4
TOTAL	—			.553	.374	.803	33.2	18.8	6.1	2.0	88.4	99.6

Source: Basketbol Süper Ligi

=== EuroLeague ===
Player	GP	GS	MPG	2FG%	3FG%	FT%	RPG	APG	SPG	BPG	PPG	PIR
Wade Baldwin IV	27	13	24:13	.476	.309	.797	2.7	3.7	0.9	0.1	11.1	11.0
Jilson Bango	10	0	6:59	.588	—	.875	1.8	0.1	0.2	0.1	2.7	3.0
Tarik Biberović	37	7	22:29	.514	.432	.833	3.1	1.4	0.5	0.2	10.4	8.4
Khem Birch	36	19	13:39	.585	—	.725	3.7	0.6	0.4	0.4	3.5	5.2
Metecan Birsen	2	0	3:27	.500	—	1.000	2.0	0	0	0	2.0	2.5
Bonzie Colson	39	35	18:27	.478	.357	.658	3.5	0.5	0.6	0.3	6.7	6.8
Mert Emre Ekşioğlu	3	0	3:14	—	—	—	0	0	0	0	0	0
Marko Gudurić	36	25	22:02	.582	.384	.883	2.6	3.1	0.7	0.1	10.9	11.9
Devon Hall	32	15	23:28	.536	.387	.822	2.2	3.4	0.5	0.1	7.8	8.8
Nigel Hayes-Davis	39	39	31:20	.498	.410	.908	5.3	1.7	1.1	0.3	16.7	18.3
Melih Mahmutoğlu	6	1	5:30	.500	.400	—	0.3	0.2	0	0	2.3	1.0
Errick McCollum	18	5	18:26	.583	.394	.842	2.1	1.8	0.6	0.4	11.1	11.3
Nicolò Melli	38	1	17:16	.619	.373	.607	4.1	1.1	0.6	0.4	4.9	6.8
Dyshawn Pierre	25	1	11:33	.500	.367	.941	2.0	0.8	0.3	0.2	3.3	4.8
Sertaç Şanlı	33	17	13:04	.618	.361	.780	2.4	0.7	0.4	0.5	5.5	5.3
Scottie Wilbekin	1	0	2:05	—	—	—	0	0	0	0	0	0
Artūrs Žagars	22	13	14:54	.429	.324	.750	1.1	2.3	0.4	0	5.9	5.8
Boban Marjanović	6	2	10:04	.455	.000	1.000	3.5	0.7	0.2	0	4.0	5.2
Skylar Mays	14	2	10:07	.471	.294	.625	1.1	0.9	0.4	0.1	3.7	3.1
TOTAL	—			.526	.383	.819	35.6	17.1	6.1	2.5	83.6	92.6

Source: EuroLeague
