= Danielle Donehew =

American basketball executive

Danielle Marie Donehew (born January 15, 1978) is an American women's basketball executive. She is the former president of the Women's Basketball Hall of Fame Board of Directors and Executive Vice President of the Atlanta Dream.

== Early life ==
Donehew was born on January 15, 1978, to parents Robert Donehew and Marie Mouchet in Atlanta, Georgia. She attended Sequoyah High School in Hickory Flat, Georgia where she played on their basketball, soccer, and volleyball teams. Upon graduating in 1996, Donehew set a school record of earning 11 letters throughout her high school career. Donehew also played on the boys' golf team and was offered the opportunity to be a kicker for their football team. Prior to joining the Georgia Tech Yellow Jackets women's basketball team, Donehew was named an All-State honorable mention and Georgia High School Scholar-Athlete of the Year. She also earned awards in other sports and was an all-region and all-state selection in volleyball and an all-region player in soccer. While playing as a guard in her senior year, Donehew was praised by her basketball coach for being "a big-time player who...gives the other kids a lot of confidence."

As a senior at Sequoyah High School, Donehew was recruited by both Georgia Tech and Georgia Lady Bulldogs basketball but was only offered a scholarship by Georgia Tech. She was told by the Lady Bulldogs' coach Andy Landers that she could be a walk-on in her freshman year due to her family's financial situation and her grades. Although she was originally upset, her mother convinced her to attend Georgia Tech.

=== Collegiate career ===
Donehew played for the Georgia Tech Yellow Jackets women's basketball team from 1996 until 2000. In her freshman year, she played in 26 of 27 games, starting three and averaging 15 minutes a game, and ranked fourth on the team in scoring. Donehew led the conference in three-point field goal percentages and tied the school record for most three-pointers in a single game after recording six against the Maryland Terrapins and Mercer Bears.

As a sophomore, Donehew continued her collegiate success and set a school record of seven three-pointers in one game in an 87-64 win over Charleston Southern. She finished the 1997–1998 season with a career-high 25 points as the Yellow Jackets fell in the second round of the ACC Tournament. The following year, Donehew played in every game for the team and started 12 of them, resulting in her leading the conference in three-point field goals per game. Although not originally the team's starter, she was selected to start their last games of the season after teammate Butlet was moved to point guard. In this role, she finished with a career-high 27 points in a game against North Carolina and averaged 20.5 points per basket.

In her senior year at Georgia Tech, Donehew broke several team records as the Yellow Jackets qualified for the ACC Championship Tournaments. On January 6, she broke Karen Lounsbury's old record of 206 as well as set new career, season, and game 3-pointer records. At the conclusion of the season, she was the team's career leader in three-point field goals and third in conference history. This earned her an honorable mention All-ACC in back-to-back seasons and the 2000 Robert Cup as Georgia Tech's top senior scholar-athlete.

== Career statistics ==
Legend
GP	Games played	GS	Games started	MPG	Minutes per game	RPG	Rebounds per game
APG	Assists per game	SPG	Steals per game	BPG	Blocks per game	PPG	Points per game
TO	Turnovers per game	FG%	Field-goal percentage	3P%	3-point field-goal percentage	FT%	Free-throw percentage
**Bold**	Career best	°	League leader

=== College ===
Year	Team	GP	GS	MPG	FG%	3P%	FT%	RPG	APG	SPG	BPG	TO	PPG
1996–97	Georgia Tech	26	-	-	**42.9**	**43.2**	68.4	1.2	0.9	0.3	0.0	-	6.7
1997–98	Georgia Tech	28	-	-	29.5	29.3	72.7	1.4	0.9	0.3	0.0	-	5.1
1998–99	Georgia Tech	27	-	-	42.5	41.0	**88.5**	**1.7**	**1.3**	**0.6**	0.0	-	**11.6**
1999–00	Georgia Tech	**31**	-	-	34.3	33.6	73.7	1.2	0.9	0.5	0.0	-	9.7
**Career**		112	-	-	37.2	36.9	76.3	1.3	1.0	0.4	0.0	-	8.3
Statistics retrieved from Sports-Reference.

== Career ==
=== Coaching ===
After graduating, Donehew was offered a graduate assistant position by Pat Summitt for one year with the University of Tennessee Lady Volunteer before being promoted to assistant director. She also served in this role for one year before being promoted again to director of basketball operations for five years.

=== Executive ===
After spending seven years with the University of Tennessee Lady Volunteer, Donehew was named Executive Vice President of the Women's National Basketball Association (WNBA) team, the Atlanta Dream, by team president Bill Bolen in April 2008. When Atlanta Dream owner Ron Terwilliger sold the franchise, Donehew moved to the Big East Conference to become associate commissioner for women’s basketball. In recognition of her collegiate accomplishments, Donehew was named to the Atlantic Coast Conference's Women's Basketball Legends in 2013.

In 2014, Donehew was named Executive Director of the Women's Basketball Coaches Association (WBCA), becoming the third person to lead the association since it was founded. While serving in this role, she oversaw all operational affairs for the WBCA including marketing endeavours, budget, and all WBCA programs, services, and staff. She also led their external affairs in other organizations including the NCAA, USA Basketball, the WNBA, the Women’s Basketball Hall of Fame, the Naismith Memorial Basketball Hall of Fame, and the Women’s Sports Foundation.

Donehew served as president of the Women's Basketball Hall of Fame Board of Directors for a three-year term before being replaced by Carol Stiff in 2020. In recognition of her accomplishments, Donehew received the 2018 United States Basketball Writers Association Mary Jo Haverbeck Award, "presented annually to recognize those who have rendered a special service to the USBWA." Prior to stepping down as president, Donehew was inducted into the Hall of Fame.
