= Hickory Flat =

Hickory Flat may refer to several places in the United States:

- Hickory Flat, Alabama
- Hickory Flat, Georgia
- Hickory Flat, Kentucky
- Hickory Flat, Mississippi
- Hickory Flat, Tennessee
- Hickory Flat, Virginia
