= Jordan Usher =

American basketball player

- Usher with Esenler Erokspor in 2026

No. 8 – Safiport Erokspor
- Position: Small forward
- League: Basketbol Süper Ligi

Personal information
- Born: February 21, 1998 (age 28) (Note: Sources for his birth date say either February 21, 1998; May 21, 1998; or February 21, 1999.) Atlanta, Georgia, U.S.
- Listed height: 6 ft 7 in (2.01 m)
- Listed weight: 220 lb (100 kg)

Career information
- High school: Sequoyah (Hickory Flat, Georgia); Wheeler (Marietta, Georgia)
- College: USC (2017–2018); Georgia Tech (2019–2022)
- NBA draft: 2022: undrafted
- Playing career: 2022–present

Career history
- 2022–2023: Beşiktaş J.K.
- 2023–2024: Perth Wildcats
- 2024–2025: JL Bourg
- 2025–2026: Türk Telekom
- 2026–present: Esenler Erokspor

Jordan Emanuel Usher (born February 21, 1998) is an American professional basketball player for Esenler Erokspor of the Basketbol Süper Ligi (BSL). He played college basketball for the USC Trojans and Georgia Tech Yellow Jackets before beginning his professional career in Turkey with Beşiktaş J.K. in the 2022–23 season.

== High school career ==
Usher was born in Atlanta, Georgia. He played his first three seasons of high school basketball at Sequoyah High School in Hickory Flat, Georgia. As a sophomore in 2014–15, he averaged 22.3 points per game and had a career-best 37 points during the season. As a junior in 2015–16, he averaged 18.3 points, 8.2 rebounds, 3.2 assists, 2.5 steals and 1.3 blocks per game, leading his team to a 20–9 record. At the 2016 Region 7AAAAA tournament, he helped the Chiefs win their semifinal matchup against Sprayberry High School with 29 points, 10 rebounds, five steals, three blocks and three assists. He led a late Chiefs' rally, which resulted in a 77–70 win. He went on to win the Region 7AAAAA Player of the Year award.

On November 11, 2016, Usher signed a National Letter of Intent to play college basketball for the University of Southern California.

As a senior in 2016–17, Usher attended Wheeler High School in Marietta, Georgia, where he helped lead his team to a 21–9 record and to the state GHSA 7-A quarterfinals.

== College career ==
As a freshman at USC in 2017–18, Usher played in all 36 games for the Trojans and averaged 4.8 points and 2.0 rebounds per game. His 40.9 percent shooting from three-point range tied for third all-time among USC freshmen. He scored a season-best 14 points three times.

In the 2018–19 season, Usher played in 12 games for the Trojans before leaving the program in late December. He averaged 8.6 points and 3.7 rebounds in 24.5 minutes per game. He scored a season-high 22 points twice.

On December 31, 2018, Usher announced he was transferring from USC. On January 8, 2019, it was announced he was enrolling at Georgia Tech and that he would become eligible to play for the Yellow Jackets midway through the 2019–20 season.

Upon becoming eligible to play on December 18, 2019, Usher started all 23 games to finish the season for the Yellow Jackets and averaged 8.2 points and 4.4 rebounds per game. He scored a season-high 18 points against Boise State in his second game.

In the 2020–21 season, Usher averaged 11.6 points, 4.2 rebounds, 2.8 assists and 1.6 steals per game. He scored a season-high 21 points against Clemson on January 20, 2021. The Yellow Jackets won the 2021 ACC tournament and Usher was named to the ACC All-Tournament team.

In the 2021–22 season, Usher scored in double digits in 26 of 32 games and posted seven games of 10 or more rebounds. He averaged career bests of 14.78 points, 6.5 rebounds, 2.9 assists and 1.46 steals per game. He twice scored 30 points in a game, both in overtime wins against Georgia State and Boston College.

During his college career, Usher was listed as a guard/forward and earned a reputation for being able to defend at all five positions while also playing in the post.

== Professional career ==
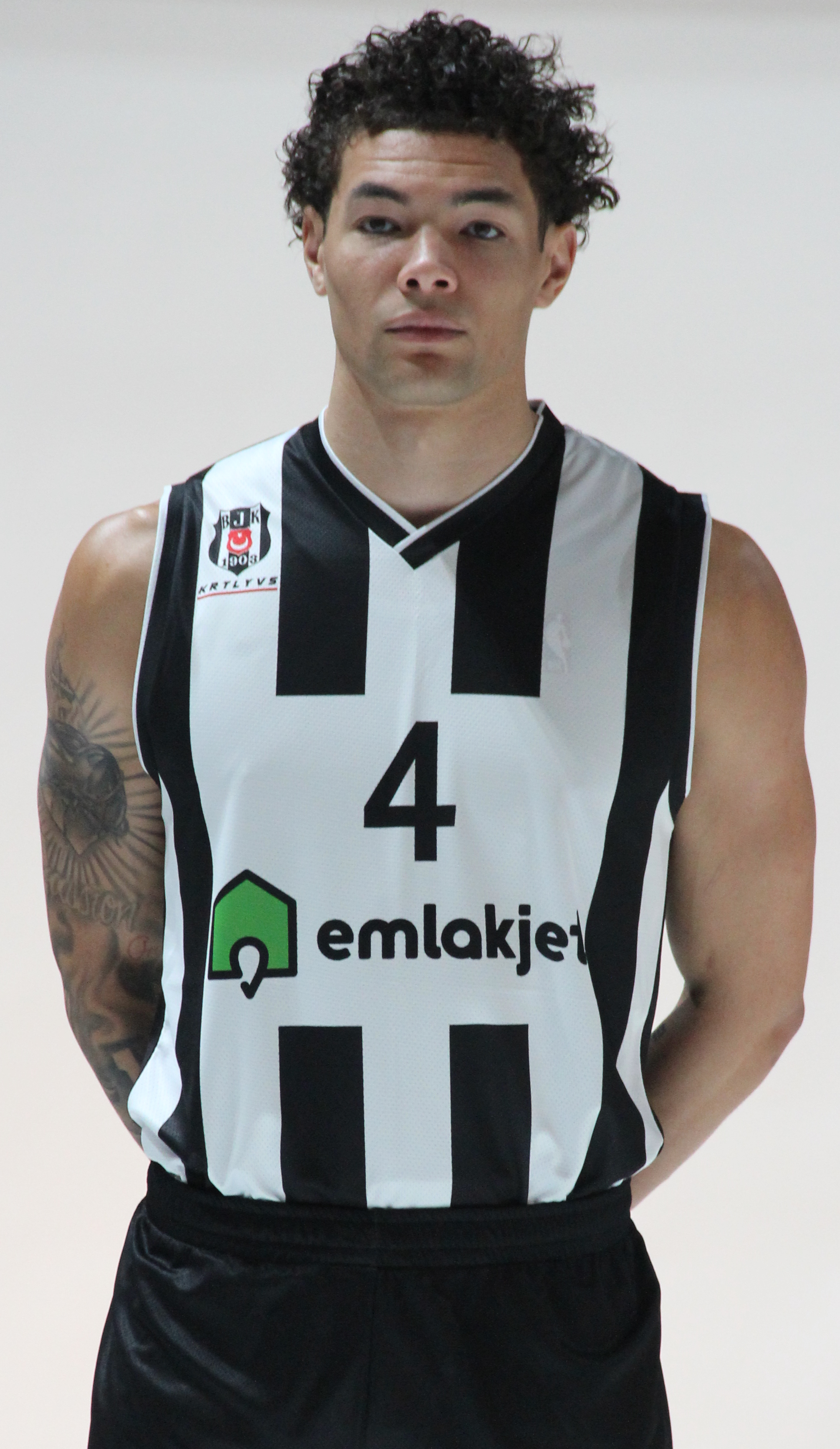
Usher with Beşiktaş J.K. in 2022

Usher participated in a pre-draft workout with the Utah Jazz. After going undrafted in the 2022 NBA draft, he joined the Jazz for the 2022 NBA Summer League.

On July 28, 2022, Usher signed with Beşiktaş J.K. of the Turkish Basketbol Süper Ligi (BSL) for the 2022–23 season. In 30 BSL games, he averaged 14.33 points, 3.73 rebounds, 1.23 assists and 1.23 steals per game. He also appeared in one FIBA Europe Cup game.

In July 2023, Usher played for the Phoenix Suns in the 2023 NBA Summer League.

On August 9, 2023, Usher signed with the Perth Wildcats of the Australian National Basketball League (NBL) for the 2023–24 season. In his debut for the Wildcats on September 29, 2023, he scored a game-high 35 points in a 101–95 win over the Tasmania JackJumpers, setting the highest score ever by a Wildcats player on debut. He struggled to have an impact in the following games and was subsequently moved to the bench on November 4. That decision coincided with the Wildcats turning their season around and resulted in Usher's form improving. In 31 games, he averaged 12.3 points, 3.4 rebounds and 1.4 assists per game.

On June 13, 2024, Usher signed with JL Bourg of the LNB Pro A. He averaged 10.9 points, 3.4 rebounds and 1.1 steals while starting in all 18 of his EuroCup appearances during the 2024–25 season.

On July 17, 2025, Usher signed with Türk Telekom of the Turkish BSL, returning to the league for a second stint. In 30 BSL games, he averaged 10.1 points, 3.3 rebounds, 1.4 assists and 1.1 steals per game. He also averaged 9.0 points, 3.4 rebounds, 1.5 assists and 1.2 steals in 23 EuroCup games.

On July 4, 2026, Usher signed with Esenler Erokspor of the Turkish BSL.

== Personal life ==
Usher is the son of Karen and Henry Usher.
