= Esenler Erokspor (basketball) =

Safiport Erokspor
- Leagues: Basketbol Süper Ligi; Europe Cup
- Founded: 2022; 4 years ago
- History: List: Esenler Erokspor (2022–2025) Safiport Erokspor (2025–present)
- Arena: Sinan Erdem Dome
- Capacity: 16,000
- Location: Istanbul, Turkey
- Team colors: Yellow, green
- President: Zafer Topaloğlu
- General manager: Aycan Şarlı
- Team manager: Berke Özalp
- Head coach: Ufuk Sarıca
- Team captain: Yunus Emre Sonsırma
- 2025–26 position: BSL; 8th of 16
- Website: Official website

Esenler Erokspor, also known as Safiport Erokspor for sponsorship reasons, is a Turkish professional basketball club based in Esenler, Istanbul. Founded in 2022, the club currently competes in the Basketbol Süper Ligi, the top-tier basketball league in Turkey.

== History ==
Esenler Erokspor Basketball Team is the professional basketball branch of the Turkish sports club Esenler Erokspor, which was originally founded in 1959 as a football club. The basketball division was established much later, making its official debut in the 2022–2023 season by joining the Turkish Basketball Second League (TB2L). In the summer of 2023, the team was invited by the Turkish Basketball Federation to participate in the Turkish Basketball League (TBL), the second tier of the national basketball pyramid, for the 2023–2024 season. The team earned promotion to the Turkish Basketball Super League (BSL) after winning the playoff series against Ankaragücü in the 2024–25 season.

Before the 2025–26 season, the club parted ways with head coach Ender Arslan, who had led the team to top-flight promotion. On 9 July 2025, Ufuk Sarıca was appointed as his successor. The club relocated its home games to the Sinan Erdem Dome. They played their first BSL home game at the arena on 4 October 2025, narrowly losing 72–67 to Trabzonspor. In December 2025, the team was renamed Safiport Erokspor following a sponsorship agreement. In their debut BSL season, Erokspor finished the regular season in eighth place with a 17–13 record, qualifying for the playoffs. The team was subsequently eliminated in the quarterfinals after losing the best-of-three series 2–0 to Fenerbahçe. Despite the loss, their top-eight finish secured the club a spot in the Basketball Champions League for the upcoming season, marking their debut in European competitions.

== Sponsorship naming ==
- Esenler Erokspor: 2022–2025
- Safiport Erokspor: 2025–present

== Home arenas ==
- Başakşehir Spor Kompleksi (2022–23, 2024)
- Ahmet Cömert Sport Hall (2023–24, 2024–2025)
- Sinan Erdem Dome (2025–present)

== Players ==
=== Current roster ===
Safiport Erokspor roster
Players
Coaches

Pos.	No.	Nat.	Name	Ht.	Age
F	0	(Turkey)	Aksu, Ataberk	1.98 m (6 ft 6 in)	22 – 12 January 2004
G	1	(Netherlands)	van der Vuurst, Keye	1.91 m (6 ft 3 in)	24 – 29 December 2001
G	3	(United States)	McCollum, Errick	1.88 m (6 ft 2 in)	38 – 22 January 1988
SG	4	(United States)	Davis Jr., Mike	1.93 m (6 ft 4 in)	30 – 22 May 1996
F	8	(United States)	Usher, Jordan	2.01 m (6 ft 7 in)	28 – 21 February 1998
F	9	(United States)	Webb III, James	2.06 m (6 ft 9 in)	33 – 19 August 1993
PF	10	(Germany)	Yebo, Kevin	2.02 m (6 ft 8 in)	29 – 6 November 1996
PF	12	(United States)	Sow, Amadou	2.06 m (6 ft 9 in)	27 – 18 November 1998
PG	14	(United States) (Albania)	Moore, Dallas	1.83 m (6 ft 0 in)	31 – 27 October 1994
G	17	(Turkey)	Tunca, Melih	1.97 m (6 ft 6 in)	21 – 13 October 2005
SF	18	(Turkey)	Arna, Egehan	2.03 m (6 ft 8 in)	29 – 5 January 1997
PG	19	(Turkey)	Sonsırma, Yunus Emre (C)	1.92 m (6 ft 4 in)	34 – 8 October 1992
C	41	(Turkey)	Akyel, Metehan	2.06 m (6 ft 9 in)	30 – 9 July 1996
C	77	(Turkey)	Yaşar, Muhsin	2.08 m (6 ft 10 in)	30 – 31 December 1995

Head coach

- (Turkey) Ufuk Sarıca

Assistant coach(es)

- (Turkey) Recep Şen
- (Turkey) Murat Bilge
- (Turkey) Cemal Bayraktar
- (Turkey) Semih Şenyurt

Legend

- (C) Team captain
- Injured

- Roster
Updated: September 11, 2026

Note: Flags indicate national team eligibility at FIBA-sanctioned events. Players may hold other non-FIBA nationalities not displayed.

=== Depth chart ===
Pos.	Starting 5	Bench 1	Bench 2	Bench 3
C	Amadou Sow	Muhsin Yaşar
PF	Kevin Yebo	James Webb III	Metehan Akyel
SF	Egehan Arna	Jordan Usher	Ataberk Aksu
SG	Mike Davis Jr.	Melih Tunca		Yunus Emre Sonsırma
PG	Keye van der Vuurst	Errick McCollum		Dallas Moore

== Season by season ==
Season	Tier	Division	Pos.	Pos.	W–L	Cup Competitions
2022–23	3	TB2L	3rd	SF	18–5	
2023–24	2	TBL	12th	–	14–20	
2024–25	2	TBL	2nd	F	33–8	
2025–26	1	BSL	8th	QF	17–15	Quarterfinalist

== Trophies and awards ==
Türkiye Basketbol Ligi

- Runners-up (1): 2024–25
