= Sequoyah High School (Georgia) =

Public school in Cherokee County, Georgia

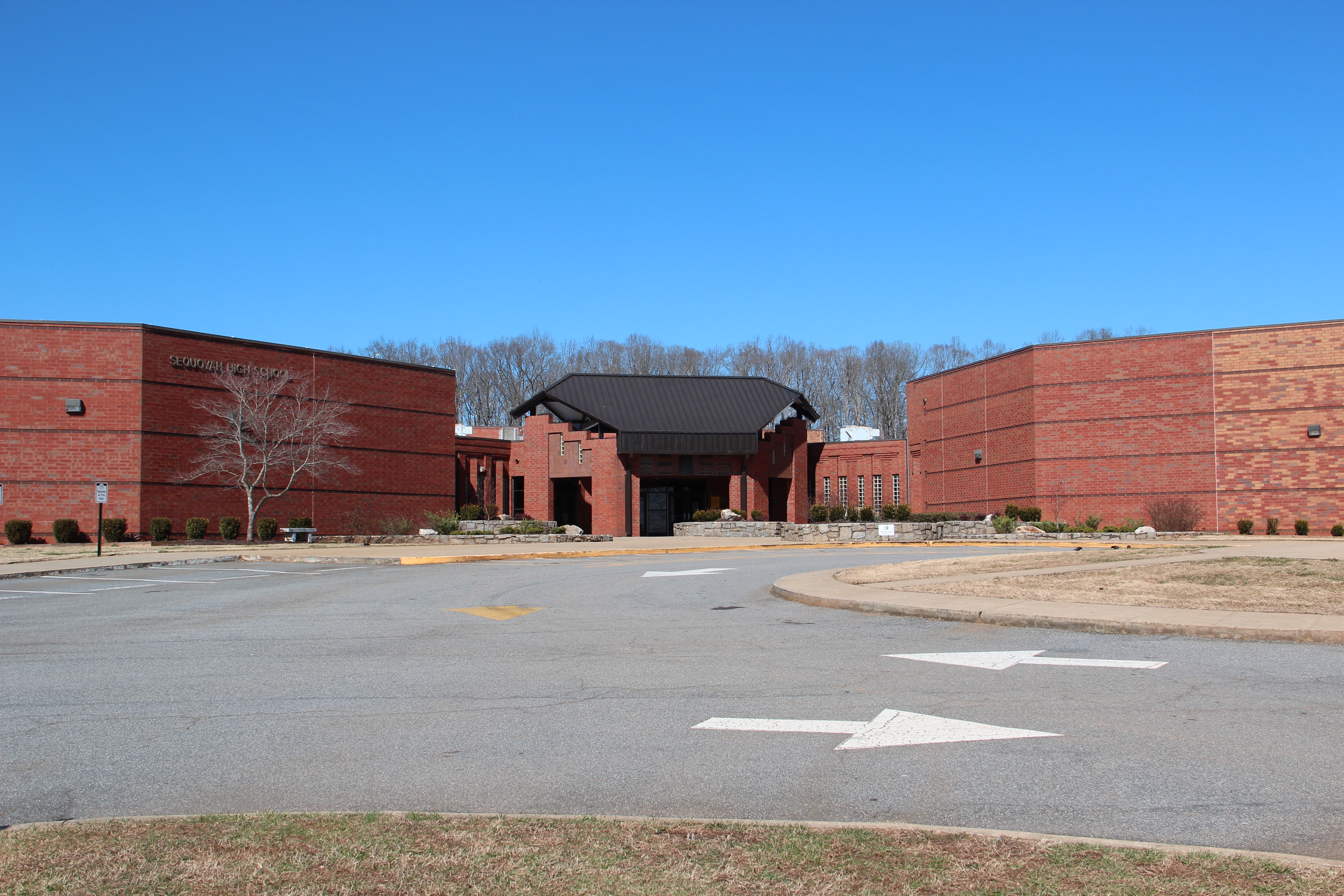

Location
- 4485 Hickory Road; Canton, Cherokee, Georgia 30115; United States; 34°10′18″N 84°25′47″W

Information
- Type: Public high school
- Motto: Elevating the Excellence
- Established: 1990
- Status: Open
- School district: Cherokee County School District (CCSD)
- NCES District ID: 1301110
- Superintendent: Mary Elizabeth Davis
- CEEB code: 110590
- NCES School ID: 130111002100
- Principal: Robert Van Alstyne
- Assistant Principals: Dr. Meagan Waid; Laura Kudlak; Jason Meade; Peter Vajda; Jennifer Perez
- Faculty: 162
- Teaching staff: 121.40 (FTE)
- Grades: 9–12
- Enrollment: 2,021 (2024-2025)
  - Grade 9: 501
  - Grade 10: 506
  - Grade 11: 514
  - Grade 12: 500
- Student to teacher ratio: 16.65
- Campus type: Suburban
- Colors: Black & Gold
- Mascot: Chief
- Team name: Chiefs
- Rival: Creekview High School
- USNWR ranking: 3,273
- National ranking: 2,722
- Website: shs.cherokeek12.net

Sequoyah High School is a public high school located in Hickory Flat, Georgia, United States. It educates students in grades 9–12. It opened in the fall of 1990 and is one of seven high schools in Cherokee County, including Cherokee, Etowah, Woodstock, Creekview, River Ridge and I-Grad Virtual Academy.

In athletics the school participates in Georgia High School Association classification AAAAA, Region 6. The team colors are black and gold.

== Administration ==
- Robert Van Alstyne – Principal

== Departments ==
- Advanced Placement
- Career and Technical Education
- English
- Fine Arts
- Foreign Language
- Mathematics
- Media Center
- Physical Education
- Science
- Social Studies
- Special Education

== Athletics and activities ==
The following Georgia High School Association sanctioned sports are offered:

Sequoyah HS Athletic Programs
Team	Head coach	Championships/Awards/Notes
Baseball	Scott Barber	
Basketball (boys)	Mike Saxton	
Basketball (girls)	Chris Yarbrough	State champion - 1994, 1996 State runner up - 2022
Cross country	Corinne Ingram	
Competitive cheerleading	Cassie Pichon	
Dance	Karrie Mattice	
Football (boys)	James Teter	
Golf (boys)	Greg Ross	
Golf (girls)	Sarah Williams	
Gymnastics	Karrie Mattice	
Lacrosse (boys)	Ben Sparks	
Lacrosse (girls)	Brent Budde	
Soccer (boys)	John Zonin	
Soccer (girls)	Ryelyn Wells	
Softball	Lisa Chapman	State champion - 2006
Swimming	Cora Hodgins	
Tennis (boys)	Emma Mitchell	
Tennis (girls)	Betsy Powell	
Track and field (boys)	Travis Sheffield	
Track and field (girls)	Steve Collins	
Volleyball	John Edwards	State champion - 2014State runner up - 2003, 2004, 2013, 2015, 2019, 2021, 2022
Wrestling	Joe Hulen	State champion (Traditional) - 1996, 1999State runner up (Duals) - 2020

== Notable alumni ==
- Danielle Donehew - Women's National Basketball Association (WNBA) executive
- Hunter Gaddis - baseball player, pitcher
- Cullen Harper - college football quarterback
- Bryce Leatherwood - winner of season 22 of The Voice.
- Jordan Usher - professional basketball player
- Justin Wrobleski - Major League Baseball (MLB) pitcher for the Los Angeles Dodgers
