= Carol Stiff =

American basketball executive

Carol J. Stiff is an American women's basketball executive. She is the vice president of programming and acquisitions at ESPN and president of the Women's Basketball Hall of Fame's board of directors.

== Early life ==
Stiff was born and raised in Bernardsville, New Jersey by parents John and Jeanne as the youngest of six siblings. She attended the School of Saint Elizabeth for her elementary education and graduated from Bernards High School in 1979. During her childhood, Stiff played basketball for Catholic Youth Organization and cites her coach, Sister Mary Cleary, as a major influence on her athletic career. Cleary had attended the University of Dayton where Stiff's uncle, Don Donoher, was head coach of the men's basketball team.

== Career ==
=== Collegiate ===
Following graduation, Stiff was recruited to play collegiate basketball at Southern Connecticut State University by a coach who left before she began her freshman year. She spent two years on the Southern Connecticut Fighting Owls on the bench before switching to playing field hockey. In 1983, Stiff graduated with a Bachelor of Science degree in physical education with the goal of becoming a teacher of physical education, however she was unable to secure a job in that field.

=== Coaching and ESPN ===
With her Bachelor of Science degree, Stiff began her coaching career with the Western Connecticut State University's field hockey team from 1983 until 1985. From there, she transferred to the Rensselaer Polytechnic Institute where she served as head coach for the women's basketball team and a physical education instructor for three years. Stiff later became the first assistant women's basketball coach and recruiter at Brown University, also her first position at an Ivy League school.

In 1990, Stiff accepted an entry-level position at ESPN in communications and programming of college sports. While serving in this role, Stiff started the Tennessee–UConn women's basketball rivalry when she was looking for a women's game to be broadcast on Martin Luther King Day in 1995. After being rejected by North Carolina's head coach Sylvia Hatchell, she approached Tennessee's Pat Summitt who accepted after convincing from Stiff that it was "for the good of the game." Their first game was won by UConn 77–66 and started a 12-year long rivalry which was discontinued after the 2006–2007 season. This led to ESPN signing a contract with the NCAA in 2003 which allowed them to produce all of the NCAA Women's Basketball Championship games. The rivalry consistently drew in top ratings and the 2004 NCAA Division I women's basketball tournament was the most viewed college basketball game in ESPN's history at the time.

Following the establishment of the Tennessee–UConn women's basketball rivalry, Stiff also programmed the televising of eight United States women's national basketball team games during the 1996 Summer Olympics. In part due to the success of the broadcasting, the WNBA was founded the next year. She was eventually promoted to Senior Director of Programming & Acquisitions in 2005 and elected to the Connecticut Basketball Hall of Fame. In 2008, Stiff was named the top advocate for women's basketball by The Tampa Tribune, who recognized her efforts to raise exposure for the sport through ESPN. The next year, Sports Business Journal also recognized her as "one of the most influential executives leading the way in women's sports."

In 2010, Stiff was promoted to vice president of programming and acquisitions, making her responsible for the programming acquisition and scheduling for a variety of sports on ESPN, ESPN2 and ESPNU. In this role, she worked with ESPN's Business Development and Strategy Department to spearhead the development of the 2013 Nine for IX film series. During the same year, Stiff was recognized as a Women in Sports and Events (WISE) Woman of the Year and honoree of Monmouth University. Away from ESPN, Stiff was also named to the Jimmy V Week and the Kay Yow Cancer Fund's Board of Directors starting on September 1, 2012.

In February 2020, Stiff was announced as an inductee into the Women's Basketball Hall of Fame for her contributions towards growing the sport. She later replaced Danielle Donehew as president of the Women's Basketball Hall of Fame's board of directors for two years.

In May 2021, she was awarded the John W. Bunn Lifetime Achievement Award by the Naismith Basketball Hall of Fame.
