= Metehan Akyel =

Turkish basketball player (born 1996)

- Metehan Akyel

No. 41 – Safiport Erokspor
- Position: Center
- League: Basketbol Süper Ligi

Personal information
- Born: July 9, 1996 (age 30) Turkey
- Listed height: 6 ft 9 in (2.06 m)
- Listed weight: 172 lb (78 kg)

Career information
- Playing career: 2015–present

Career history
- 2015–2019: Teksüt Bandırma
- 2019–2021: Gaziantep Basketbol
- 2021–2022: Petkim Spor
- 2022–2023: Büyükçekmece Basketbol
- 2023–2024: Türk Telekom
- 2024–present: Esenler Erokspor

Metehan Akyel (born July 9, 1996) is a Turkish professional basketball player who plays as center for Esenler Erokspor of the Basketbol Süper Ligi (BSL).
