= Yunus Emre Sonsırma =

Turkish basketball player (born 1992)

No. 19 – Safiport Erokspor
- Position: Point guard
- League: Basketbol Süper Ligi

Personal information
- Born: October 8, 1992 (age 34)
- Listed height: 6 ft 3.75 in (1.92 m)
- Listed weight: 190 lb (86 kg)

Career information
- Playing career: 2009–present

Career history
- 2009–2012: Darüşşafaka Cooper Tires
- 2012–2013: Olin Edirne
- 2013–2015: Pınar Karşıyaka
- 2015–2016: Demir İnşaat Büyükçekmece
- 2016–2018: Eskişehir
- 2018–2019: Türk Telekom
- 2019–2022: Pınar Karşıyaka
- 2022–2023: Galatasaray Nef
- 2023: Bahçeşehir Koleji
- 2023–2024: Petkim Spor
- 2024–2025: Manisa Basket
- 2025–2026: Petkim Spor
- 2026–present: Esenler Erokspor

Career highlights
- Turkish League champion (2015); Turkish Cup winner (2014); Turkish President's Cup winner (2014)

Yunus Emre Sonsırma (born October 8, 1992) is a Turkish professional basketball player for Esenler Erokspor of the Basketbol Süper Ligi (BSL).

== Professional career ==
=== Galatasaray Nef (2022–2023) ===
On 27 June 2022, he has signed with Galatasaray Nef of the Turkish Basketbol Süper Ligi (BSL).

In the notification made by Galatasaray Nef on 27 January 2023, it was announced that the transfer offer from Bahçeşehir Koleji for Sonsırma was accepted.

=== Bahçeşehir Koleji (2023) ===
On 27 January 2023, it was announced that he was transferred to Bahçeşehir Koleji.

=== Petkim Spor (2023–2024) ===
On June 1, 2023, he signed with Petkim Spor of the Basketbol Süper Ligi (BSL).

=== Manisa Basket (2024–2025) ===
On July 31, 2024, he signed with Manisa Basket of the Basketbol Süper Ligi (BSL).

=== Second stint with Petkim Spor (2025–2026) ===
On June 16, 2025, he signed with Petkim Spor of the Basketbol Süper Ligi (BSL).

=== Esenler Erokspor (2026–present) ===
On June 17, 2026, he signed with Esenler Erokspor of the Basketbol Süper Ligi (BSL).

== Turkish national team ==
He played for the Turkey U-20 National Team.
