= Ömer Ege Ziyaettin =

Turkish basketball player (born 2008)

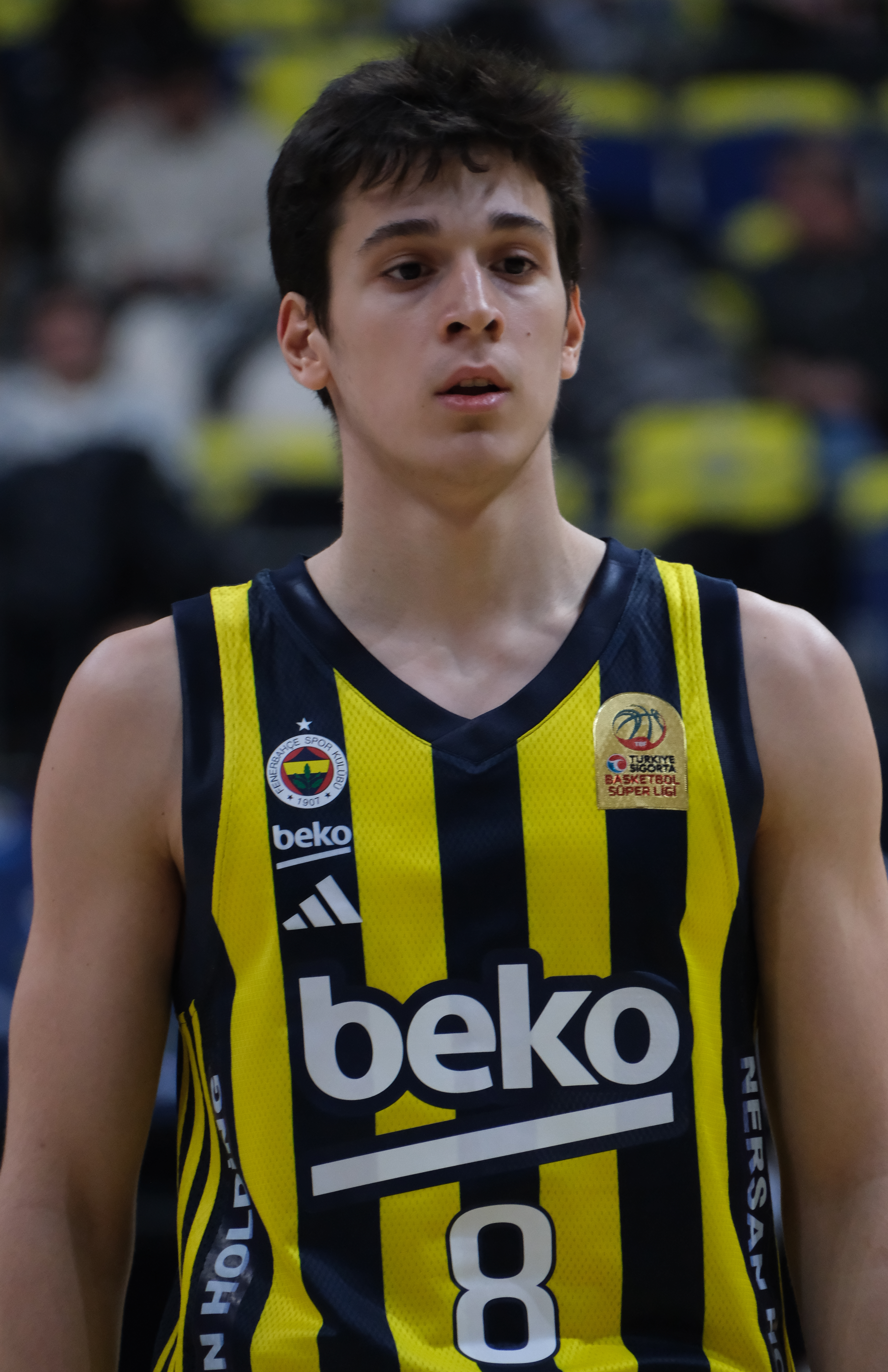
- Ziyaettin with Fenerbahçe in December 2024

No. 20 – IMG Academy Ascenders
- Position: Point guard / shooting guard

Personal information
- Born: May 20, 2008 (age 18)
- Listed height: 6 ft 1.75 in (1.87 m)

Career information
- High school: IMG Academy (Bradenton, Florida)

Career history
- 2023–2025: Fenerbahçe Koleji
- 2024–2025: Fenerbahçe

Career highlights
- 2× Turkish Super League champion (2024, 2025); 2× Turkish Cup winner (2024, 2025)

Ömer Ege Ziyaettin (born May 20, 2008) is a Turkish professional basketball player who currently attends IMG Academy in Bradenton, Florida. He also represents the Turkish under-16 national team in international competition. Standing at 6 ft 1.75 in (1.87 m), he plays at the point guard and shooting guard positions.

== Professional career ==
On March 4, 2024, he made his Turkish Super League debut with the team against Tofaş and started his basketball history. He will also play for Fenerbahçe Beko youth team Fenerbahçe Koleji Novotel for 2023–24 season.

== International career ==
With the Turkish under-16 basketball team Ziyaettin played at 2024 FIBA U16 EuroBasket. At the tournament Ziyaettin achieved the average of 30.7 minutes, 17.7 points, 4.3 assists, 4.6 rebounds, 1.0 steals and 13.7 efficiency points and was nominated for the MVP in the tournament along with 14 players in the tournament .

== Career statistics ==
Legend
GP	Games played	GS	Games started	MPG	Minutes per game
FG%	Field-goal percentage	3P%	3-point field-goal percentage	FT%	Free-throw percentage
RPG	Rebounds per game	APG	Assists per game	SPG	Steals per game
BPG	Blocks per game	PPG	Points per game	PIR	Performance index rating
**Bold**	Career high

=== Domestic leagues ===
†	Denotes seasons in which Ziyaettin won the domestic league

Year	Team	League	GP	MPG	FG%	3P%	FT%	RPG	APG	SPG	BPG	PPG
2023-24†	(Turkey) Fenerbahçe	BSL	8	3:33	.438	.400	—	.3	.3	.1	0	2.6
2024–25†	(Turkey) Fenerbahçe	BSL	1	2:21	—	—	1.000	0	0	0	0	2.0
