= Egehan Arna =

Turkish basketball player (born 1997)

- Egehan Arna

No. 18 – Safiport Erokspor
- Position: Small forward
- League: Basketbol Süper Ligi

Personal information
- Born: 5 January 1997 (age 29) Istanbul, Turkey
- Listed height: 2.03 m (6 ft 8 in)
- Listed weight: 93 kg (205 lb)

Career information
- Playing career: 2015–present

Career history
- 2015–2020: Fenerbahçe
- 2020–2022: Beşiktaş
- 2022–2023: Anadolu Efes
- 2023–2024: Beşiktaş
- 2024–2025: Bahçeşehir Koleji
- 2025: Merkezefendi Belediyesi Denizli
- 2025–present: Esenler Erokspor

Career highlights
- EuroLeague champion (2017); 4× Turkish League champion (2016–2018, 2023); 3× Turkish Cup winner (2016, 2019, 2020); 3× Turkish President's Cup winner (2016, 2017, 2022)

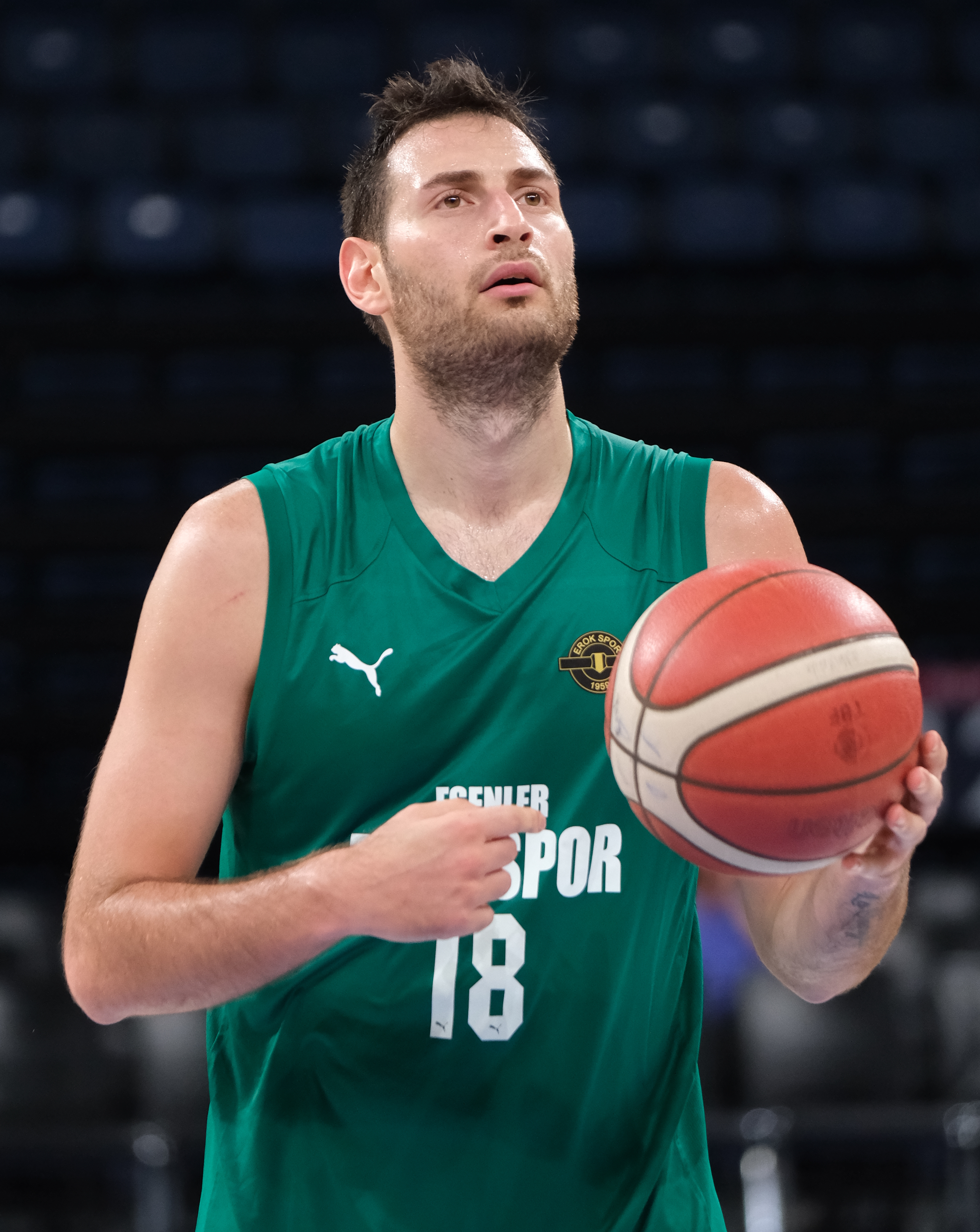
Arna with Esenler Erokspor in 2025

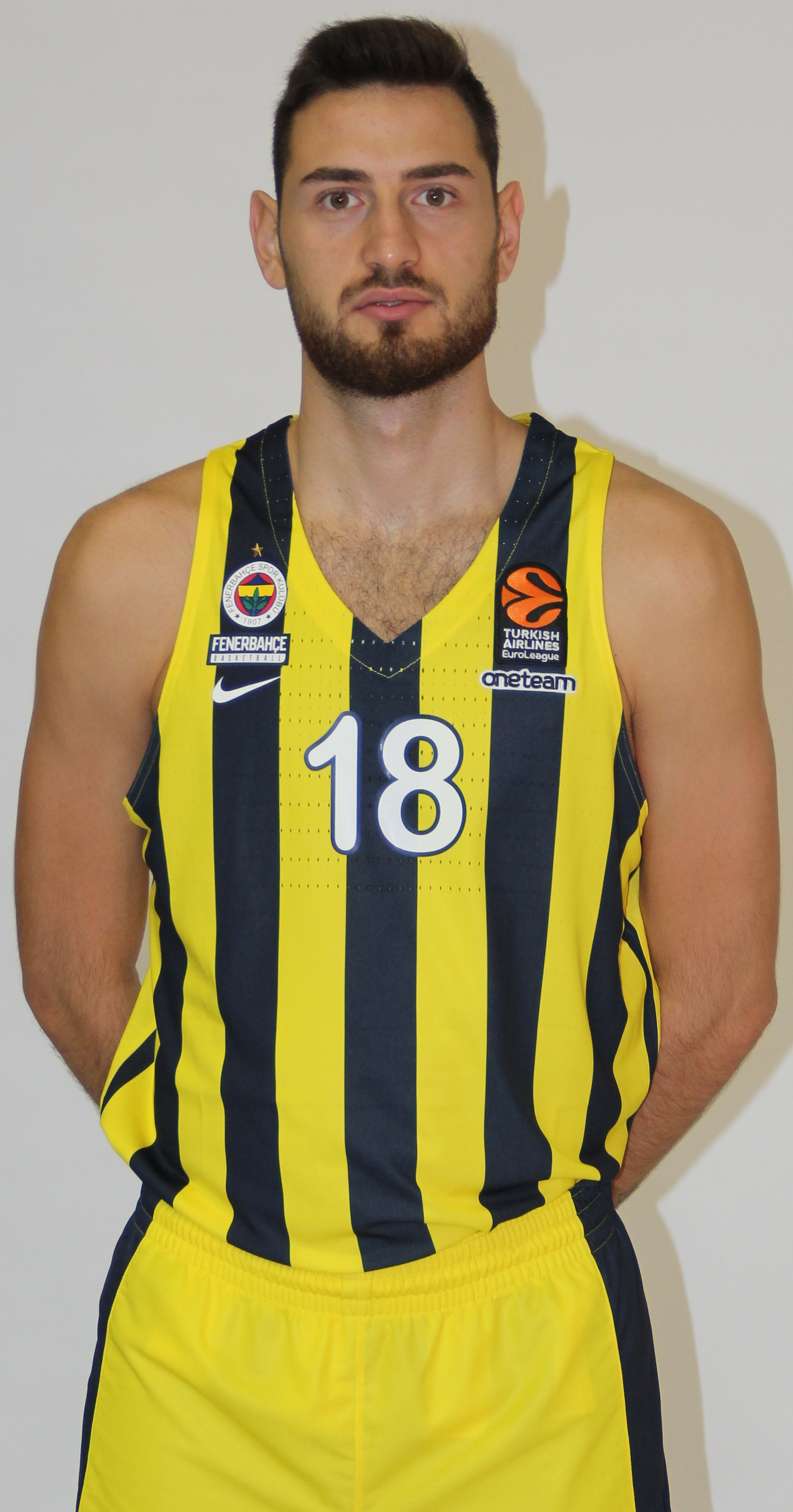

Egehan Arna (born 5 January 1997) is a Turkish professional basketball player for Esenler Erokspor of the Basketbol Süper Ligi (BSL). Standing at 2.03 m (6 ft 8 in) tall, he plays at the small forward position.

== Early years ==
Arna began playing with the youth clubs of Fenerbahçe, at the age of 7.

== Professional career ==
Arna began his pro career in 2015, with the senior men's club of Fenerbahçe. On 10 May 2019 Arna scored 51 points and had 14 rebounds in a 138–62 away win over Sakarya BB. Arna shot 20-31 from the field, while shooting on 10-16 three point field goals. He set a season-high for points scored in the 2018–19 Basketbol Süper Ligi. On 7 July 2020 Arna was released from the Turkish powerhouse.

Arna signed a two-year deal with Beşiktaş on 6 August 2020.

On 1 July 2022 Arna moved to Anadolu Efes of the Basketbol Süper Ligi (BSL).

On 21 June 2023 he signed with Beşiktaş of the Turkish Basketbol Süper Ligi (BSL) for a second stint.

On January 18, 2024, he signed with Bahçeşehir Koleji of the Basketbol Süper Ligi (BSL).

On January 23, 2025, he signed with Merkezefendi Belediyesi Denizli of the Basketbol Süper Ligi (BSL).

On July 8, 2025, he signed with Esenler Erokspor of the Basketbol Süper Ligi (BSL).

== Turkish national team ==
Arna played with the junior national teams of Turkey. With Turkey's junior national teams, he played at the 2013 FIBA Europe Under-16 Championship.

== Career statistics ==
Legend
GP	Games played	GS	Games started	MPG	Minutes per game
FG%	Field-goal percentage	3P%	3-point field-goal percentage	FT%	Free-throw percentage
RPG	Rebounds per game	APG	Assists per game	SPG	Steals per game
BPG	Blocks per game	PPG	Points per game	PIR	Performance index rating
**Bold**	Career high

=== EuroLeague ===
†	Denotes seasons in which Arna won the EuroLeague

Year	Team	GP	GS	MPG	FG%	3P%	FT%	RPG	APG	SPG	BPG	PPG	PIR
2015–16	Fenerbahçe	**7**	0	**5.6**	.231	**.400**	**.500**	**.4**	.1	**.3**	—	1.3	0.3
2016–17†	Fenerbahçe	1	0	1.0	—	—	—	—	—	—	—	0.0	-1.0
2017–18	Fenerbahçe	1	0	3.0	**.500**	—	—	—	**1.0**	—	—	**2.0**	**2.0**
2018–19	Fenerbahçe	3	0	3.3	.000	.000	—	.3	—	—	.7	0.0	-1.0
2022–23	Anadolu Efes	6	0	3.3	.000	.000	—	—	.2	—	—	0.0	-1.0
Career		18	0	4.1	.190	.200	.500	.2	.2	.1	.1	0.6	-0.3
