= Hickory Flat, Georgia =

- Unincorporated community
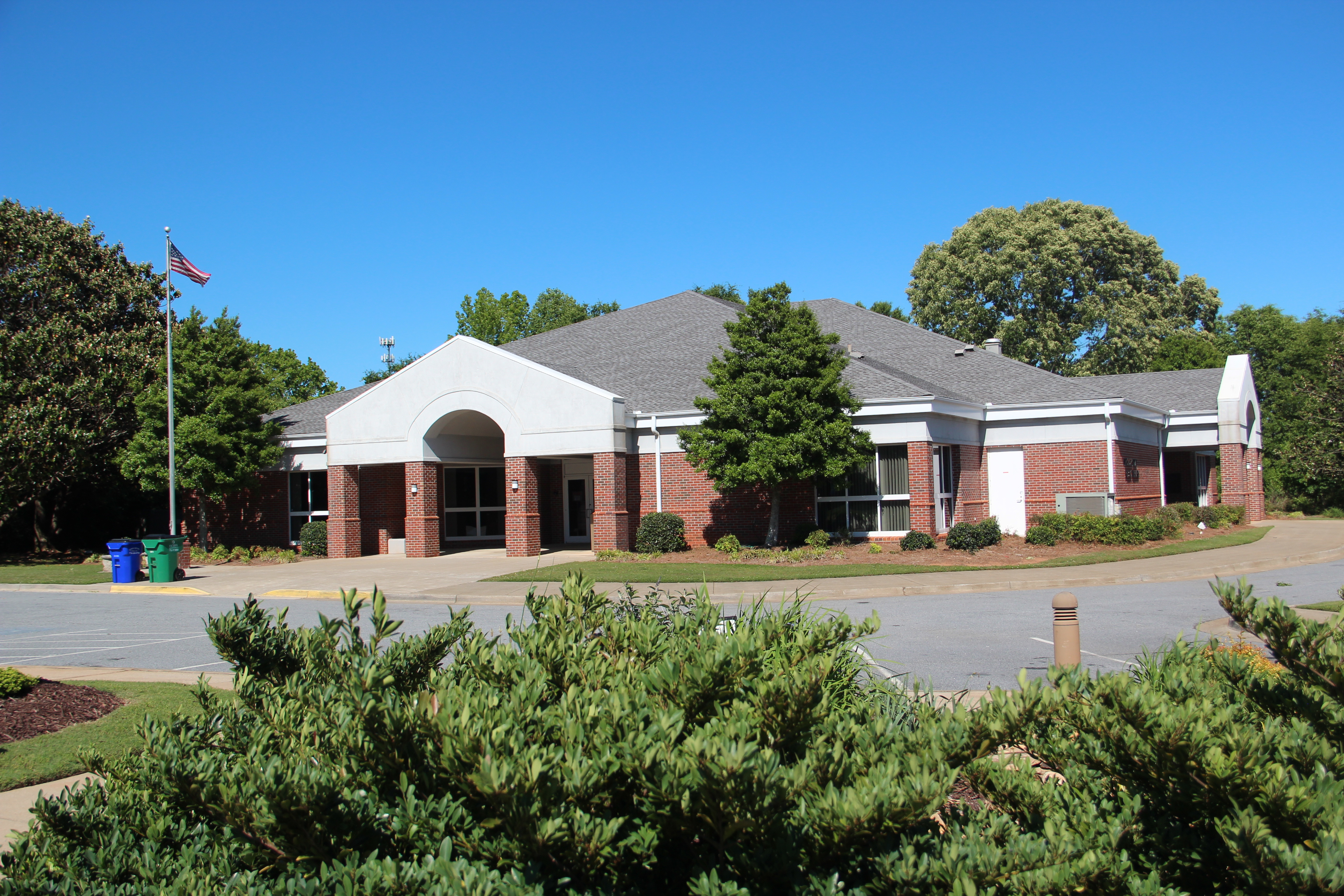
- Hickory Flat Library

- Location within Georgia Location within the United States Location within Metro Atlanta
- Coordinates: 34°10′12″N 84°25′22″W
- Country: United States
- State: Georgia
- County: Cherokee
- Time zone: UTC-5 (EST)
  - Summer (DST): UTC-4 (EDT)
- ZIP codes: 30115-30188
- Area codes: 770/678/470
- Website: www.hickoryflat.com

Hickory Flat is an unincorporated community in southeastern Cherokee County, Georgia, United States. This community is part of Metro Atlanta. Its geographic center is now a triangle formed by GA 140 on the north and east, Hickory Rd on the south, and East Cherokee Drive on the west. This triangle is now the business hub of the community with two shopping centers anchored by grocery stores. It also contains the Hickory Flat Public Library and the Sequoyah High School educational complex which includes feeder schools; Hickory Flat Elementary and Dean Rusk Middle School.

== History ==
The community of Hickory Flat dates back to the period of frontier settlement of former Cherokee lands, associated with westward expansion and gold exploration in Georgia. The community is located along an old Native American trading route. To its north along the old Indian trail is a geographic feature known to locals as "Indian Knoll". This feature in the middle of rolling farm land is a small but prominent mound where it is believed that tribes would meet, during the time of the Cherokee A map of Georgia, from 1839, clearly indicates the community situated along what would eventually become Georgia State Route 140, between the city of Canton and the community of Social Hill. Begun in 1838, Hickory Flat Academy (now Hickory Flat Elementary) was the second school to be established in Cherokee County. Another nearby school can date its history to the later half of the 19th century. Nonetheless, the community remained small and rural well into the 21st century, when urban sprawl from the Atlanta MSA stimulated economic growth and the movement of large numbers of new residents to the area. The center of the community was for many years, and is still regarded today, as the four-way stoplight at the intersection of Georgia State Route 140 and East Cherokee Drive. A store and gas station, built there in the 1950s was, for generations of local residents, the focal point and meeting place for the community. The second floor of the store was originally used as a Masonic hall. The structure took on other functions in the late 20th century, and fell into disrepair by the early 21st century. When plans were announced to demolish the structure, and build a modern fast food outlet, The Cherokee County Historical Society sought to rally support for preservation and restoration of the dilapidated structure. However, the effort failed to gain sufficient traction, and the building was demolished to make way for a Chick-fil-A. Seeking to acknowledge the history and importance of the store's location, as a local gathering spot, the new Chick-fil-A included a "vintage-inspired" interior design, which features a large "gathering table" made from reclaimed wood.

=== Suburban sprawl ===
Once a sparsely populated community, with many acres of open land and few people per square mile, Hickory Flat has begun to embrace modern fast food outlets and retail stores. All new homes have a minimum of 0.2 acres (0.081 ha). Since 2007, new home and commercial builders have taken to the area. Today, retail space continues to be constructed to keep up with the fast-growing population.

Within a 10-mile (16 km) radius of the town is the county seat of Canton, to the north, and Woodstock, to the south. Access to I-575 and GA 400 are also within a 20-mile (32 km) span. It is approximately 40 miles (64 km) north of downtown Atlanta.

== Zip codes ==
- 30115, Canton residences and businesses
- 30188, Woodstock residences and businesses

== Schools ==
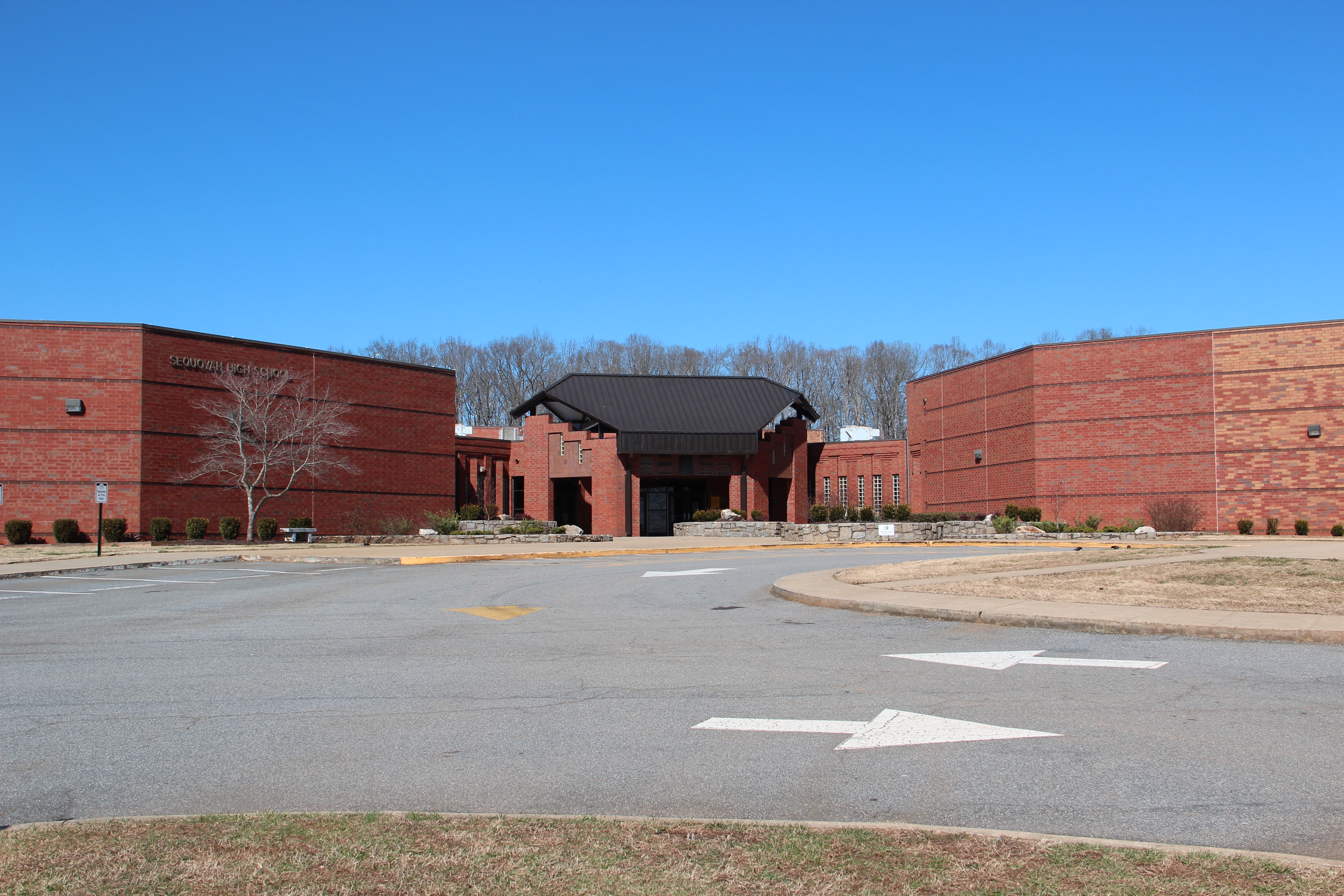
Sequoyah High School

The town has three main public schools, located side-by-side on Hickory Road: Hickory Flat Elementary, Dean Rusk Middle School, and Sequoyah High School. Hickory Flat Elementary was built in 1903, marking the location of the town center. The Messiah Montessori School, which moved to a newly constructed campus on Highway 140 in 2008, provided the first private school in the area upon its 2005 founding, but operations ceased.

- Hickory Flat Elementary School
- Dean Rusk Middle School
- Sequoyah High School
