= 2022–23 Virtus Bologna season =

Italian basketball club season

Virtus Bologna
2022–23 season
- Owner: Massimo Zanetti
- President: Massimo Zanetti
- Head coach: Sergio Scariolo
- Arena: Segafredo Arena
- LBA: Runners-up
- EuroLeague: 14th
- Italian Cup: Runners-up
- Supercup: Winners

The 2022–23 season is Virtus Bologna's 94th in existence and the club's 6th consecutive season in the top flight of Italian basketball.

== Kit ==
Supplier: Macron / Sponsor: Segafredo

| Home | Away |

== Players ==
=== Current roster ===
Virtus Segafredo Bologna roster
Players
Coaches

| Pos. | No. | Nat. | Name | Ht. | Wt. | Age |
|---|---|---|---|---|---|---|
| G/F | 00 | (France) | Cordinier, Isaïa | 1.96 m (6 ft 5 in) | 84 kg (185 lb) | 29 – 28 November 1996 |
| PG | 1 | (Italy) (United States) | Mannion, Nico | 1.90 m (6 ft 3 in) | 86 kg (190 lb) | 25 – 14 March 2001 |
| G/F | 3 | (Italy) | Belinelli, Marco (C) | 1.96 m (6 ft 5 in) | 100 kg (220 lb) | 40 – 25 March 1986 |
| PG | 6 | (Italy) | Pajola, Alessandro | 1.94 m (6 ft 4 in) | 95 kg (209 lb) | 26 – 9 November 1999 |
| C | 7 | (Belgium) | Bako, Ismaël | 2.08 m (6 ft 10 in) | 95 kg (209 lb) | 30 – 10 October 1995 |
| C | 14 | (France) | Jaiteh, Mouhammadou | 2.11 m (6 ft 11 in) | 112 kg (247 lb) | 31 – 27 November 1994 |
| G | 19 | (Nigeria) (Denmark) | Lundberg, Gabriel | 1.93 m (6 ft 4 in) | 92 kg (203 lb) | 31 – 4 December 1994 |
| PF | 21 | (Georgia (country)) | Shengelia, Tornike | 2.06 m (6 ft 9 in) | 109 kg (240 lb) | 34 – 5 October 1991 |
| G | 23 | (United States) (Italy) | Hackett, Daniel | 1.96 m (6 ft 5 in) | 97 kg (214 lb) | 38 – 19 December 1987 |
| PF | 24 | (Croatia) | Menalo, Leo | 2.08 m (6 ft 10 in) | 95 kg (209 lb) | 24 – 6 January 2002 |
| F/C | 25 | (United States) | Mickey, Jordan | 2.03 m (6 ft 8 in) | 107 kg (236 lb) | 32 – 9 July 1994 |
| C | 29 | (Senegal) | Camara, Gora | 2.14 m (7 ft 0 in) | 114 kg (251 lb) | 25 – 12 April 2001 |
| SF | 34 | (United States) | Weems, Kyle | 1.98 m (6 ft 6 in) | 100 kg (220 lb) | 37 – 23 August 1989 |
| F | 37 | (Nigeria) (United States) | Ojeleye, Semi | 1.98 m (6 ft 6 in) | 109 kg (240 lb) | 31 – 5 December 1994 |
| G | 44 | (Serbia) | Teodosić, Miloš | 1.96 m (6 ft 5 in) | 90 kg (198 lb) | 39 – 19 March 1987 |
| SF | 55 | (Ghana) (Italy) | Abass, Awudu | 1.98 m (6 ft 6 in) | 100 kg (220 lb) | 33 – 27 January 1993 |

Head coach

- (Italy) Sergio Scariolo

Assistant coach(es)

- (Italy) Andrea Diana
- (Italy) Alberto Seravalli
- (Italy) Cristian Fedrigo
- (Italy) Iacopo Squarcina
- (Italy) Matteo Cassinerio

Legend

- (C) Team captain
- Injured

- Roster
Updated: June 10, 2023

Note: Flags indicate national team eligibility at FIBA-sanctioned events. Players may hold other non-FIBA nationalities not displayed.

=== Depth chart ===
| Pos. | Starting 5 | Bench 1 | Bench 2 | Bench 3 |
|---|---|---|---|---|
| C | Jordan Mickey | Mouhammadou Jaiteh | Ismaël Bako | Gora Camara |
| PF | Tornike Shengelia | Semi Ojeleye | | Leo Menalo |
| SF | Isaïa Cordinier | Awudu Abass | Kyle Weems |
| SG | Marco Belinelli | Miloš Teodosić | Gabriel Lundberg |
| PG | Daniel Hackett | Alessandro Pajola | Nico Mannion |

(colors: Italian or homegrown players; foreign players; young players)

=== Squad changes ===
==== In ====
| No. | Pos. | Nat. | Name | Age | Moving from | | Type | Ends | Transfer fee | Date | Source |
|---|---|---|---|---|---|---|---|---|---|---|---|
| 25 | F/C | (United States) | Jordan Mickey | 28 | Zenit Saint Petersburg | (Russia) | 2 years | June 2024 | Free | 13 July 2022 | |
| 7 | C | (Belgium) | Ismaël Bako | 26 | Bàsquet Manresa | (Spain) | 2 years | June 2024 | Free | 13 July 2022 | |
| 19 | SG | (Denmark) | Gabriel Lundberg | 27 | Phoenix Suns | (United States) | 2 years | June 2024 | Free | 21 July 2022 | |
| 37 | F | (United States) | Semi Ojeleye | 27 | Los Angeles Clippers | (United States) | 2 years | June 2024 | Free | 28 July 2022 | |
| 24 | PF | (Croatia) | Leo Menalo | 20 | Stella Azzurra Roma | (Italy) | 4 years | June 2026 | Free | 2 August 2022 | |
| 29 | C | (Senegal) | Gora Camara | 21 | Victoria Libertas Pesaro | (Italy) | 2 years | June 2024 | Free | 3 August 2022 | |

==== Out ====
| No. | Pos. | Nat. | Name | Age | Moving to | | Type | Transfer fee | Date | Source |
|---|---|---|---|---|---|---|---|---|---|---|
| 7 | PF | (Bosnia and Herzegovina) | Amar Alibegović | 27 | KK Cedevita Olimpija | (Slovenia) | End of contract | Free | 1 July 2022 | |
| 0 | C | (Italy) | Amedeo Tessitori | 27 | Reyer Venezia | (Italy) | End of contract | Free | 1 July 2022 | |
| 25 | C | (United States) | JaKarr Sampson | 29 | Liaoning Flying Leopards | (China) | Exit option | Free | 12 July 2022 | |
| 9 | C | (Nigeria) | Ekpe Udoh | 35 | Shimane Susanoo Magic | (Japan) | Exit option | Free | 26 July 2022 | |
| 8 | PF | (United States) | Kevin Hervey | 26 | Free agent | | Mutual consent | Free | 28 July 2022 | |
| 17 | SG | (Italy) | Marco Ceron | 30 | Pallacanestro Nardò | (Italy) | Exit option | Free | 5 August 2022 | |
| 11 | PG | (Italy) | Michele Ruzzier | 29 | Pallacanestro Trieste | (Italy) | Mutual consent | Free | 21 November 2022 | |

==== Confirmed ====
| No. | Pos. | Nat. | Name | Age | Moving from | | Type | Ends | Transfer fee | Date | Source |
|---|---|---|---|---|---|---|---|---|---|---|---|
| 6 | PG | (Italy) | Alessandro Pajola | 22 | youth team | | 5 + 4 | June 2025 | Youth system | 2015–16 | |
| 44 | PG | (Serbia) | Miloš Teodosić | 35 | Los Angeles Clippers | (United States) | 3 + 1 years | June 2023 | Free | 13 July 2019 | |
| 34 | SF | (United States) | Kyle Weems | 32 | Tofaş S.K. | (Turkey) | 2 + 2 years | June 2023 | Free | 20 July 2019 | |
| 55 | SF | (Italy) | Awudu Abass | 29 | Basket Brescia Leonessa | (Italy) | 1 + 3 years | June 2024 | Free | 15 June 2020 | |
| 3 | G/F | (Italy) | Marco Belinelli | 36 | San Antonio Spurs | (United States) | 3 years | June 2023 | Free | 26 November 2020 | |
| 11 | PG | (Italy) | Michele Ruzzier | 29 | Pallacanestro Varese | (Italy) | 2 years | June 2023 | €15,000 | 5 July 2021 | |
| 14 | C | (France) | Mouhammadou Jaiteh | 27 | Gaziantep Basketbol | (Turkey) | 2 years | June 2023 | Free | 20 July 2021 | |
| 1 | PG | (Italy) (United States) | Nico Mannion | 21 | Golden State Warriors | (United States) | 2 years | June 2023 | Free | 10 August 2021 | |
| 00 | SG | (France) | Isaïa Cordinier | 25 | Nanterre 92 | (France) | 2 years | June 2023 | Free | 6 October 2021 | |
| 23 | PG | (Italy) (United States) | Daniel Hackett | 34 | CSKA Moscow | (Russia) | 2 years | June 2024 | $100,000 | 3 March 2022 | |
| 21 | PF | (Georgia (country)) | Tornike Shengelia | 34 | CSKA Moscow | (Russia) | 2 years | June 2024 | Free | 13 September 2022 | |
