= 2023–24 Virtus Bologna season =

Italian basketball club season

Virtus Bologna
2023–24 season
- Owner: Massimo Zanetti
- President: Massimo Zanetti
- Head coach: Luca Banchi
- Arena: Segafredo Arena
- LBA: Runners-up
- EuroLeague: 9th
- Italian Cup: Quarterfinalists
- Supercup: Winners

The 2023–24 season is Virtus Bologna's 95th in existence and the club's 7th consecutive season in the top flight of Italian basketball.

== Kit ==
Supplier: Macron / Sponsor: Segafredo

Home	Away

== Players ==
=== Current roster ===
Virtus Segafredo Bologna roster
Players
Coaches

Pos.	No.	Nat.	Name	Ht.	Wt.	Age
G/F	00	(France)	Cordinier, Isaïa	1.96 m (6 ft 5 in)	84 kg (185 lb)	29 – 28 November 1996
G	1	(Denmark) (Nigeria)	Lundberg, Gabriel	1.93 m (6 ft 4 in)	92 kg (203 lb)	31 – 4 December 1994
G/F	3	(Italy)	Belinelli, Marco (C)	1.96 m (6 ft 5 in)	100 kg (220 lb)	40 – 25 March 1986
PG	6	(Italy)	Pajola, Alessandro	1.94 m (6 ft 4 in)	95 kg (209 lb)	26 – 9 November 1999
G/F	13	(Serbia)	Dobrić, Ognjen	2.00 m (6 ft 7 in)	93 kg (205 lb)	31 – 27 October 1994
PG	14	(Italy)	Mascolo, Bruno	1.90 m (6 ft 3 in)	85 kg (187 lb)	30 – 4 March 1996
C	15	(United States)	Cacok, Devontae (injured)	2.03 m (6 ft 8 in)	109 kg (240 lb)	29 – 8 October 1996
SG	19	(Latvia)	Lomažs, Rihards	1.93 m (6 ft 4 in)	87 kg (192 lb)	30 – 13 April 1996
PF	21	(Georgia (country))	Shengelia, Tornike	2.06 m (6 ft 9 in)	109 kg (240 lb)	34 – 5 October 1991
G	23	(Italy) (United States)	Hackett, Daniel	1.96 m (6 ft 5 in)	97 kg (214 lb)	38 – 19 December 1987
PF	24	(Croatia)	Menalo, Leo	2.08 m (6 ft 10 in)	95 kg (209 lb)	24 – 6 January 2002
F/C	25	(United States)	Mickey, Jordan	2.03 m (6 ft 8 in)	107 kg (236 lb)	32 – 9 July 1994
PF	33	(Italy)	Polonara, Achille	2.03 m (6 ft 8 in)	90 kg (198 lb)	34 – 23 November 1991
C	41	(Croatia)	Žižić, Ante	2.10 m (6 ft 11 in)	121 kg (267 lb)	29 – 4 January 1997
C	42	(United States) (Armenia)	Dunston, Bryant	2.03 m (6 ft 8 in)	107 kg (236 lb)	40 – 28 May 1986
SF	55	(Italy)	Abass, Awudu	1.98 m (6 ft 6 in)	100 kg (220 lb)	33 – 27 January 1993

Head coach

- (Italy) Luca Banchi

Assistant coach(es)

- (Finland) Lassi Tuovi
- (Italy) Alberto Seravalli
- (Italy) Cristian Fedrigo
- (Serbia) Nenad Jakovljević
- (Italy) Matteo Cassinerio

Athletic trainer(s)

- (Italy) Matteo Panichi

Legend

- (C) Team captain
- Injured

- Roster
Updated: March 29, 2024

Note: Flags indicate national team eligibility at FIBA-sanctioned events. Players may hold other non-FIBA nationalities not displayed.

=== Depth chart ===
Pos.	Starting 5	Bench 1	Bench 2	Inactive
C	Bryant Dunston	Ante Žižić		Devontae Cacok (injured)
PF	Tornike Shengelia	Jordan Mickey	Achille Polonara
SF	Marco Belinelli	Ognjen Dobrić	Awudu Abass
SG	Isaïa Cordinier	Gabriel Lundberg	Rihards Lomažs
PG	Daniel Hackett	Alessandro Pajola	Bruno Mascolo

(colors: Italian or homegrown players; foreign players; young players)

=== Squad changes ===
==== In ====
No.	Pos.	Nat.	Name	Age	Moving from		Type	Ends	Transfer fee	Date	Source
14	PG	(Italy)	Bruno Mascolo	27	New Basket Brindisi	(Italy)	2 years	June 2025	Free	6 July 2023	
33	PF	(Italy)	Achille Polonara	31	BC Žalgiris	(Lithuania)	2 years	June 2025	Free	6 July 2023	
15	C	(United States)	Devontae Cacok	26	CSKA Moscow	(Russia)	2 years	June 2025	Free	11 July 2023	
13	G/F	(Serbia)	Ognjen Dobrić	28	KK Crvena zvezda	(Serbia)	2 years	June 2025	Free	13 July 2023	
9	G	(United States) (Croatia)	Jaleen Smith	28	Alba Berlin	(Germany)	2 years	June 2025	Free	20 July 2023	
42	C	(United States) (Armenia)	Bryant Dunston	37	Anadolu Efes S.K.	(Turkey)	1 year	June 2024	Free	25 August 2023	
19	G	(Latvia)	Rihards Lomažs	27	Merkezefendi	(Turkey)	6 months	June 2024	Free	29 December 2023	
41	C	(Croatia)	Ante Žižić	26	Anadolu Efes S.K.	(Turkey)	2 years	June 2026	Free	31 December 2023	

1. In players: Players that signed after the beginning of the season

==== Out ====
No.	Pos.	Nat.	Name	Age	Moving to		Type	Transfer fee	Date	Source
34	SF	(United States)	Kyle Weems	33	Derthona Basket	(Italy)	End of contract	Free	1 July 2023	
1	PG	(Italy) (United States)	Nico Mannion	22	Saski Baskonia	(Spain)	End of contract	Free	1 July 2023	
14	C	(France)	Mouhammadou Jaiteh	28	AS Monaco	(France)	End of contract	Free	1 July 2023	
44	G	(Serbia)	Miloš Teodosić	36	KK Crvena zvezda	(Serbia)	End of contract	Free	1 July 2023	
37	F	(Nigeria) (United States)	Semi Ojeleye	28	Valencia Basket	(Spain)	Exit option	$300,000	1 July 2023	
29	C	(Senegal)	Gora Camara	22	Universo Treviso Basket	(Italy)	Loan	Free	13 July 2023	
7	C	(Belgium)	Ismaël Bako	27	Unics Kazan	(Russia)	Exit option	$200,000	24 August 2023	
9	G	(United States) (Croatia)	Jaleen Smith	29	KK Partizan	(Serbia)	Mutual consent	Free	24 December 2023	
24	PF	(Croatia)	Leo Menalo	22	Pallacanestro Trieste	(Italy)	Loan	Free	4 April 2024	

1. Out players: Players that left after the beginning of the season

==== Confirmed ====
No.	Pos.	Nat.	Name	Age	Moving from		Type	Ends	Transfer fee	Date	Source
6	PG	(Italy)	Alessandro Pajola	23	youth team		7 + 3 years	June 2026	Youth system	2015–16	
55	SF	(Italy)	Awudu Abass	30	Basket Brescia Leonessa	(Italy)	1 + 3 years	June 2024	Free	15 June 2020	
3	G/F	(Italy)	Marco Belinelli	37	San Antonio Spurs	(United States)	3 + 2 years	June 2025	Free	26 November 2020	
00	SG	(France)	Isaïa Cordinier	26	Nanterre 92	(France)	2 + 2 years	June 2025	Free	6 October 2021	
23	PG	(Italy) (United States)	Daniel Hackett	35	CSKA Moscow	(Russia)	2 years	June 2024	$100,000	3 March 2022	
21	PF	(Georgia (country))	Tornike Shengelia	35	CSKA Moscow	(Russia)	2 years	June 2024	Free	13 September 2022	
25	F/C	(United States)	Jordan Mickey	28	Zenit Saint Petersburg	(Russia)	2 years	June 2024	Free	13 July 2022	
1	SG	(Denmark)	Gabriel Lundberg	27	Phoenix Suns	(United States)	2 years	June 2024	Free	21 July 2022	
24	PF	(Croatia)	Leo Menalo	20	Stella Azzurra Roma	(Italy)	4 years	June 2026	Free	2 August 2022	
