= 2023–24 LBA season =

LBA
- League: Lega Basket Serie A
- Season: 2023–24
- Dates: 30 September 2023 – 13 June 2024
- Teams: 16

Regular season
- Season MVP: (Italy) Marco Belinelli

Finals
- Champions: AX Armani Exchange Milano (31st title)
- Runners-up: Virtus Segafredo Bologna
- Finals MVP: (Spain) Nikola Mirotic

Statistical leaders
Points	(Italy) Nico Mannion	20.3
Rebounds	(Croatia) Miro Bilan	8.3
Assists	(United States) Tyler Ennis	6.7

Lega Basket Serie A seasons
- ← 2022–23 2024–25 →

The 2023–24 LBA season was the 102nd season of the Lega Basket Serie A (LBA), the men's top tier professional basketball division of the Italian basketball league system.

== Teams ==
=== Promotion and relegation ===
Trieste and Verona ended, respectively, on 15th and 16th place and therefore relegated to the Serie A2.

Pistoia and Cremona were two best teams in Serie A2 and therefore promoted to Serie A.

=== Number of teams by region ===
Number of teams	Region	Team(s)
4	Lombardy	EA7 Emporio Milano; Germani Basket Brescia; Openjobmetis Varese; Vanoli Cremona
2	Campania	Gevi Napoli; Givova Scafati
2	Emilia-Romagna	UNAHOTELS Reggio Emilia; Virtus Segafredo Bologna
2	Veneto	NutriBullet Treviso; Umana Reyer Venezia
1	Apulia	Happy Casa Brindisi
1	Marche	Carpegna Prosciutto Basket Pesaro
1	Piedmont	Bertram Derthona Tortona
1	Sardinia	Banco di Sardegna Sassari
1	Trentino-Alto Adige/Südtirol	Dolomiti Energia Trento
1	Tuscany	Estra Pistoia

=== Venues and locations ===
Location of teams in 2023–24 LBA season

Team	Home city	Arena	Capacity	2022–23 result
Banco di Sardegna Sassari	Sassari	PalaSerradimigni	5,000	4th
Bertram Derthona Basket Tortona	Tortona	PalaFerraris	3,510	3rd
Carpegna Prosciutto Basket Pesaro	Pesaro	Vitifrigo Arena	10,323	8th
EA7 Emporio Armani Milano	Milan	Mediolanum Forum	12,331	1st
Estra Pistoia	Pistoia	PalaCarrara	3,916	Promoted to LBA
Dolomiti Energia Trento	Trento	BLM Group Arena	4,360	6th
Germani Brescia	Brescia	PalaLeonessa	5,200	9th
Givova Scafati	Scafati	PalaMangano	3,700	10th
Gevi Napoli	Naples	PalaBarbuto	5,500	12th
Happy Casa Brindisi	Brindisi	PalaPentassuglia	3,534	7th
NutriBullet Treviso	Treviso	PalaVerde	5,134	11th
Openjobmetis Varese	Varese	Enerxenia Arena	5,107	13th
Umana Reyer Venezia	Venice	Palasport Taliercio	3,506	5th
UNAHOTELS Reggio Emilia	Reggio Emilia	PalaBigi	4,530	14th
Vanoli Cremona	Cremona	PalaRadi	3,519	Promoted to LBA
Virtus Segafredo Bologna	Bologna	Segafredo Arena	9,980	2nd

== Regular season ==
In the regular season, teams play against each other home-and-away in a round-robin format. The matchdays are from 30 September 2023 to 5 May 2024.

Points scored in overtime counts toward tiebreakers. Tiebreakers are based on articule 62 of Regolamento Esecutivo Gare.

Pos	Team	Pld	W	L	PF	PA	PD	Pts	Qualification
1	Virtus Segafredo Bologna	30	22	8	2668	2305	+363	44 (Note: Virtus Bologna 164-157 Milano)	Qualification to Playoffs
2	EA7 Emporio Armani Milano	30	22	8	2412	2235	+177	44	Qualification to Playoffs
3	Germani Brescia	30	21	9	2618	2353	+265	42	Qualification to Playoffs
4	Umana Reyer Venezia	30	19	11	2488	2356	+132	38	Qualification to Playoffs
5	UNAHOTELS Reggio Emilia	30	16	14	2403	2406	−3	32	Qualification to Playoffs
6	Estra Pistoia	30	15	15	2432	2514	−82	30 (Note: Pistoia 178-158 Trento)	Qualification to Playoffs
7	Dolomiti Energia Trento	30	15	15	2498	2557	−59	30	Qualification to Playoffs
8	Bertram Derthona Tortona	30	14	16	2411	2378	+33	28 (Note: Derthona 3-1, Napoli 3-1, Sassari 0-4, Derthona 173-153 Napoli)	Qualification to Playoffs
9	Generazione Vincente Napoli Basket	30	14	16	2587	2613	−26	28	
10	Banco di Sardegna Sassari	30	14	16	2394	2482	−88	28	
11	Vanoli Basket Cremona	30	12	18	2406	2389	+17	24 (Note: Cremona 3-3, Scafati 3-3, Treviso 3-3, Varese 3-3, Cremona 488-480 (1.017), Scafati 562-554 (1.014), Treviso 530-529 (1.002), Varese 531-548 (0.969))	
12	Givova Scafati	30	12	18	2481	2626	−145	24	
13	NutriBullet Treviso	30	12	18	2434	2545	−111	24	
14	Openjobmetis Varese	30	12	18	2618	2702	−84	24	
15	Carpegna Prosciutto Pesaro	30	10	20	2417	2626	−209	20 (Note: Pesaro 159-154 Brindisi)	Relegation to Serie A2
16	Happy Casa Brindisi	30	10	20	2275	2455	−180	20	Relegation to Serie A2

Updated to match(es) played on 5 May 2024. Source: LBA

=== Results ===
Home \ Away	BRE	BRI	CRE	MIL	NAP	PES	PIS	REG	SAS	SCA	TOR	TRE	TVS	VAR	VEN	VBO
Germani Brescia	—	94–75	84–75	72–64	80–71	81–79	109–90	86–63	110–65	89–78	72–65	82–90	88–67	116–73	90–84	73–87
Happy Casa Brindisi	88–79	—	79–76	57–87	77–80	68–81	72–78	63–87	70–76	98–103	77–86	89–82	93–75	86–81	84–80	83–75
Vanoli Basket Cremona	84–77	75–58	—	72–73	90–83	96–69	67–74	91–95	86–74	68–63	83–67	99–80	70–76	82–83	92–90	93–83
EA7 Emporio Armani Milano	83–77	69–55	74–51	—	86–84	82–90	81–86	79–68	80–65	99–77	83–82	91–86	86–80	94–63	95–72	82–80
Generazione Vincente Napoli Basket	83–104	90–71	80–70	77–68	—	93–75	93–95	87–89	88–79	102–92	81–76	93–103	95–81	97–96	90–97	75–88
Carpegna Prosciutto Pesaro	93–83	78–86	91–86	65–85	77–97	—	89–82	69–87	69–79	103–107	96–92	74–87	95–76	81–88	64–76	87–86
Estra Pistoia	72–84	90–96	64–60	72–78	81–76	73–74	—	83–82	68–63	78–71	84–71	73–78	83–84	78–96	85–77	70–91
UNAHOTELS Reggio Emilia	70–77	74–66	78–71	68–72	88–74	101–68	95–82	—	77–59	85–77	77–90	77–75	90–83	113–80	77–60	72–66
Banco di Sardegna Sassari	106–101	84–81	86–80	89–83	90–111	91–96	107–69	95–73	—	79–76	74–94	80–73	80–76	88–112	62–73	93–88
Givova Scafati	83–89	76–84	112–122	77–68	91–85	83–82	85–77	102–76	74–99	—	94–91	75–62	95–93	102–90	66–95	75–81
Bertram Derthona Tortona	59–87	69–68	87–76	75–79	97–72	94–76	97–100	93–64	79–62	89–52	—	83–80	68–82	90–83	75–69	77–84
Dolomiti Energia Trento	69–93	81–71	91–84	74–79	101–94	109–82	80–105	98–88	87–76	84–79	83–81	—	82–85	90–84	106–79	75–90
NutriBullet Treviso	71–99	86–60	78–71	89–91	76–79	93–89	86–89	71–63	77–70	87–97	87–74	86–78	—	96–101	77–82	61–100
Openjobmetis Varese	92–95	81–73	68–75	70–74	113–79	91–80	83–82	116–93	90–79	94–93	78–80	84–85	95–100	—	92–103	69–81
Umana Reyer Venezia	86–71	79–71	79–76	78–72	81–89	91–79	96–69	90–70	71–78	83–59	76–60	93–68	91–78	102–88	—	70–89
Virtus Segafredo Bologna	88–76	103–76	93–85	84–75	101–89	83–66	93–100	83–73	80–66	94–67	99–70	108–61	91–77	115–84	84–85	—

Legend: Blue = home team win; Red = away team win.
Matches with lighter background shading were decided after overtime.

== Playoffs ==
Teams in bold advanced to the next round. The numbers to the left of each team indicate the team's seeding, the numbers to the right indicate the result of the series including result in bold of the team that won in that series.

Playoffs are played in 2-2-1 format where better seeded hosts first, second and fifth game while worse seeded host third and fourth game.

Quarterfinals
1	**Virtus Segafredo Bologna**	**3**
8	Bertram Derthona Tortona	2
4	**Umana Reyer Venezia**	**3**
5	UNAHOTELS Reggio Emilia	2
2	**EA7 Emporio Armani Milano**	**3**
7	Dolomiti Energia Trento	1
3	**Germani Brescia**	**3**
6	Estra Pistoia	0

Semifinals
1	**Virtus Segafredo Bologna**	**3**
4	Umana Reyer Venezia	1
2	**EA7 Emporio Armani Milano**	**3**
3	Germani Brescia	0

Finals
1	Virtus Segafredo Bologna	1
2	**EA7 Emporio Armani Milano**	**3**

=== Quarterfinals ===
Team 1	Series	Team 2	Game 1	Game 2	Game 3	Game 4	Game 5
**Virtus Segafredo Bologna**	**3**–2	Bertram Derthona Tortona	**92**–80	**83**–77	81–**91**	75–**82**	**92**–63
**Umana Reyer Venezia**	**3**–2	UNAHOTELS Reggio Emilia	74–**82**	**83**–75	66–**78**	**95**–92	**83**–67
**EA7 Emporio Armani Milano**	**3**–1	Dolomiti Energia Trento	84–**85**	**104**–93	**83**–68	**87**–69	
**Germani Brescia**	**3**–0	Estra Pistoia	**79**–70	**97**–75	**98**–77		

=== Semifinals ===
Team 1	Series	Team 2	Game 1	Game 2	Game 3	Game 4	Game 5
**Virtus Segafredo Bologna**	**3**–1	Umana Reyer Venezia	**103**–89	**79**–78	73–**78**	**96**–81	
**EA7 Emporio Armani Milano**	**3**–0	Germani Brescia	**95**–89	**77**–66	**96**–86		

=== Finals ===
Team 1	Series	Team 2	Game 1	Game 2	Game 3	Game 4	Game 5
Virtus Segafredo Bologna	1–**3**	**EA7 Emporio Armani Milano**	75–**86**	**72**–64	78–**81**	73–**85**	

=== Game 1 ===
6 June 2024	Virtus Segafredo Bologna	75–**86**(OT)	**EA7 Emporio Armani Milano**
20:30 (CET)	Scoring by quarter: **19**–14, **14**–11, 15–**29**, **20**–14, Overtime: 7–**18**
	Pts: Shengelia 16; Rebs: Shengelia 8 Cordinier 8 Asts: Lundberg 5	Boxscore	Pts: Shields 25; Napier 21; Rebs: Mirotic 8 Asts: Shields 3	Arena: Virtus Segafredo Arena; Referees: Begnis; Mazzoni; Giovannetti

=== Game 2 ===
8 June 2024	**Virtus Segafredo Bologna**	**72**–64	EA7 Emporio Armani Milano
20:30 (CET)	Scoring by quarter: 12–**17**, **20**–14, **23**–20, **17**–13
	Pts: Shengelia 21; Rebs: Shengelia 8 Pajola 7 Asts: Pajola 10	Boxscore	Pts: Hall 13; Mirotic 13; Rebs: Mirotic 7 Melli 6 Asts: Hall 2 Napier 2	Arena: Virtus Segafredo Arena; Referees: Lanzarini; Attard; Borgioni

=== Game 3 ===
11 June 2024	**EA7 Emporio Armani Milano**	**81**–78	Virtus Segafredo Bologna
20:30 (CET)	Scoring by quarter: **29**–25, 17–**19**, **16**–15, 19–19
	Pts: Mirotic 21; Shields 15; Rebs: Melli 9 Asts: Napier 6	Boxscore	Pts: Mickey 17; Rebs: Belinelli 5 Pajola 5 Asts: Pajola 10	Arena: Forum di Milano; Referees: Paternico; Rossi; Baldini

=== Game 4 ===
13 June 2024	**EA7 Emporio Armani Milano**	**85**–73	Virtus Segafredo Bologna
20:30 (CET)	Scoring by quarter: 22–**23**, **24**–13, **20**–14, 19–**23**
	Pts: Mirotic 30; Rebs: Mirotic 12; Melli 9 Asts: Napier 6	Boxscore	Pts: Cordinier 21; Rebs: Cordinier 5 Pajola 5 Asts: Cordinier 4 Pajola 4	Arena: Forum di Milano; Referees: Lanzarini; Attard; Giovannetti

== Final standings ==
Pos	Team	Pld	W	L	Qualification or relegation
1	EA7 Emporio Armani Milano (C)	41	31	10	Already qualified to EuroLeague
2	Virtus Segafredo Bologna	43	29	14	Already qualified to EuroLeague
3	Germani Brescia	36	24	12	
4	Umana Reyer Venezia	39	23	16	Qualification to EuroCup
5	UNAHOTELS Reggio Emilia	35	18	17	Qualification to Champions League regular season
6	Estra Pistoia	33	15	18	
7	Dolomiti Energia Trento	34	16	18	Qualification to EuroCup
8	Bertram Derthona Tortona	35	16	19	Qualification to Champions League regular season
9	Generazione Vincente Napoli Basket	30	14	16	
10	Banco di Sardegna Sassari	30	14	16	Qualification to Champions League qualifying rounds
11	Vanoli Basket Cremona	30	12	18	
12	Givova Scafati	30	12	18	
13	NutriBullet Treviso	30	12	18	
14	Openjobmetis Varese	30	12	18	
15	Carpegna Prosciutto Pesaro (R)	30	10	20	Relegation to Serie A2
16	Happy Casa Brindisi (R)	30	10	20	Relegation to Serie A2

Source: LBA
(C) Champions; (R) Relegated

== Awards ==
Pos.	Player	Team	Ref.
Lega Serie A MVP
SG	(Italy) Marco Belinelli	Virtus Segafredo Bologna	
Lega Serie A Finals MVP
PF	(Spain) Nikola Mirotić	EA7 Emporio Armani Milano	
Top Scorer
PG	(Italy) Nico Mannion	Openjobmetis Varese	
Domestic Player of the Year
PG	(Italy) Nico Mannion	Openjobmetis Varese	
Best Young Player
C	(Senegal) Mouhamed Faye	UNAHOTELS Reggio Emilia	
Best Defender
SG	(Italy) John Petrucelli	Germani Brescia	
Sixth Man of the Year
SG	(Denmark) Gabriel Lundberg	Virtus Segafredo Bologna	
Most Improved Player
SG	(United States) C. J. Massinburg	Germani Brescia	
Coach of the Year
HD	(Italy) Nicola Brienza	Estra Pistoia	
All-Lega Serie A Team
PG	(United States) Payton Willis	Estra Pistoia	
SG	(United States) Rayjon Tucker	Umana Reyer Venezia	
SF	(Italy) Marco Belinelli	Virtus Segafredo Bologna	
PF	(Georgia (country)) Tornike Shengelia	Virtus Segafredo Bologna	
C	(Croatia) Miro Bilan	Germani Brescia	

== Italian clubs in European competitions ==
Team	Competition	Progress
Virtus Segafredo Bologna	EuroLeague	Play-in
EA7 Emporio Armani Milano	EuroLeague	Regular Season
Umana Reyer Venezia	EuroCup	Regular season
Dolomiti Energia Trento	EuroCup	Regular Season
Bertram Derthona Tortona	Champions League	Play-ins
Banco di Sardegna Sassari	Champions League	Play-ins
Openjobmetis Varese	Champions League	Qualifying rounds
Happy Casa Brindisi	Champions League	Qualifying rounds
Openjobmetis Varese	FIBA Europe Cup	Quarterfinals
Happy Casa Brindisi	FIBA Europe Cup	Regular season

== See also ==
- 2023 Italian Basketball Supercup
