= Bruno Mascolo =

Italian basketball player (born 1996)

No. 33 – Longobardi Scafati Basket
- Position: Point guard
- League: LBA

Personal information
- Born: 4 March 1996 (age 30) Castellamare di Stabia, Italy
- Listed height: 190 cm (6 ft 3 in)
- Listed weight: 85 kg (187 lb)

Career information
- Playing career: 2011–present

Career history
- 2011–2012: Nuova Pol. Stabia
- 2012–2015: PMS Basketball
- 2013–2015: → PMS Torino
- 2015–2017: Auxilium Torino
- 2016: → Fortitudo Agrigento
- 2016: → Latina Basket
- 2016–2017: → Mens Sana 1871 Basket
- 2017–2018: Napoli
- 2018–2019: Aurora Basket Jesi
- 2019–2022: Derthona
- 2022–2023: Brindisi
- 2023–2024: Virtus Bologna
- 2024–2025: Treviso Basket
- 2025–present: Scafati Basket

Career highlights
- Serie A2 champion (2026); Italian Supercup winner (2023)

Bruno Mascolo (born 4 March 1996) is an Italian professional basketball player for Scafati Basket of the Lega Basket Serie A (LBA).

== Youth career ==
He started his youth career with the Neapolitan team Basket Team Stabia, and at the age of fifteen, he made his debut in Serie C with Nuova Polisportiva Stabia in the 2011–12 season.

== Professional career ==
In 2013–14, he made his debut in Serie A2 with PMS Torino under head coach Stefano Pillastrini. Also in the following season, he found space with the first team, reaching a total of five appearances in the two seasons and contributing to the championship victory in 2015.

In August 2015, he reached an agreement with Auxilium Torino, with which he signed a three-year contract. He made his Serie A debut on 1 November 2015 in the final seconds of a home match against Cantù. On 29 April, he moved to Agrigento until the end of the season.

=== Virtus Bologna (2023–present) ===
In July 2023, Mascolo signed a two-year deal with Virtus Bologna. On 24 September 2023, after having ousted Olimpia Milano in the semifinals, Virtus won its fourth Supercup, and the third in a row, defeating 97–60 Germani Brescia. On 7 December 2023, Mascolo made his debut in EuroLeague against FC Barcelona, scoring two points.

=== Universo Treviso Basket (2024–2025) ===
On 30 June 2024, he signed with Treviso Basket of the Lega Basket Serie A (LBA).

=== Scafati Basket (2025–present) ===
On 24 June 2025, he signed with Scafati Basket of the Lega Basket Serie A (LBA).

== National team career ==
On 10 November 2021, he was called up to coach Meo Sacchetti's long list in Italy's national basketball team in view of the 2023 FIBA Basketball World Cup qualifications, becoming the first Neapolitan called up to the national team after 37 years.

Mascolo played 1 career game for Italy's national basketball team in the World Cup qualifications.

29 November 2021 2023 FIBA Basketball World Cup qualifications	Netherlands	73–75	Italy	Milan
		Boxscore		Arena: Mediolanum Forum
Note: Points: 0

== Career statistics ==
Legend
GP	Games played	GS	Games started	MPG	Minutes per game
FG%	Field-goal percentage	3P%	3-point field-goal percentage	FT%	Free-throw percentage
RPG	Rebounds per game	APG	Assists per game	SPG	Steals per game
BPG	Blocks per game	PPG	Points per game	PIR	Performance index rating
**Bold**	Career high

=== EuroLeague ===
Year	Team	GP	GS	MPG	FG%	3P%	FT%	RPG	APG	SPG	BPG	PPG	PIR
2023–24	Bologna	2	0	5.0	.250	—	—	.5	—	—	—	1.0	-0.5
Career		2	0	5.0	.250	—	—	.5	—	—	—	1.0	-0.5
