= Daniel Hackett =

Italian-American basketball player (born 1987)

- Hackett with Virtus Bologna in 2026

No. 23 – Virtus Bologna
- Position: Point guard / shooting guard
- League: LBA; EuroLeague

Personal information
- Born: December 19, 1987 (age 38) Forlimpopoli, Italy
- Listed height: 196 cm (6 ft 5 in)
- Listed weight: 97 kg (214 lb)

Career information
- High school: St. John Bosco (Bellflower, California)
- College: USC (2006–2009)
- NBA draft: 2009: undrafted
- Playing career: 2009–present

Career history
- 2009–2010: Benetton Treviso
- 2010–2012: Scavolini Pesaro
- 2012–2013: Mens Siena
- 2013–2015: Olimpia Milano
- 2015–2017: Olympiacos
- 2017–2018: Brose Bamberg
- 2018–2022: CSKA Moscow
- 2022–present: Virtus Bologna

Career highlights
- EuroLeague champion (2019); EuroCup champion (2022); 2× VTB United League champion (2019, 2021); VTB United League Supercup winner (2021); VTB United League Playoffs MVP (2021); Greek League champion (2016); 2× Lega Serie A champion (2014, 2025); Italian Cup winner (2013); 3× Italian Supercup winner (2013, 2022, 2023); Italian Cup MVP (2013); Italian Supercup MVP (2013); Lega Serie A Finals MVP (2013); 2× Lega Serie A All-star (2011, 2012); Lega Serie A All-Star Game MVP (2012); Second-team All-Pac-10 (2009)
Medals
Men's basketball
Representing Italy
European U-20 Championship
Bronze medal – third place	2007 Italy

Daniel Lorenzo Hackett (born December 19, 1987) is an Italian–American professional basketball player and the team captain for Virtus Bologna of the Lega Basket Serie A (LBA) and the EuroLeague. Standing at 1.96 m (6 ft 5 in), he can play at both the point guard and shooting guard positions.

== Early life ==
Hackett was born in Forlimpopoli, (Forlì-Cesena), Italy. He is the son of Rudy Hackett, an American professional basketball player, who played in both the ABA and the NBA, and an Italian mother. He grew up in Pesaro, Italy.

== High school career ==
Hackett left Italy to attend high school at St. John Bosco High School of Bellflower, California, in the United States.

== College career ==
Hackett studied at the University of Southern California, where he played college basketball. Starting with his freshman year, he was the USC Trojans' point guard, and with the Trojans he played in the NCAA Tournament three times. On November 17, 2007, Hackett had his first triple double with the Trojans', putting on the score sheet 22 points, 10 rebounds, and 10 assists.

== Professional career ==
=== Benetton Treviso (2009–2010) ===
After going undrafted in the 2009 NBA draft, Hacket signed a one-year deal with Benetton Treviso of the Italian LBA.

=== Scavolini Pesaro (2010–2012) ===
In July 2010, he signed a two-year deal with Scavolini Pesaro.

=== Mens Sana (2012–2013) ===
In 2012, he signed a two-year deal with the Italian team Montepaschi Siena. In his first season with the team, he was named, both Italian League Finals and Italian Cup most valuable player. Also, in his first career EuroLeague season, he averaged 7.2 points, 3 assists, and 2.3 rebounds over 22 games.

=== Olimpia Milano (2013–2015) ===
On December 24, 2013, he signed a three-year deal with EA7 Emporio Armani Milano. On June 19, 2015, he parted ways with Milano.

=== Olympiacos (2015–2017) ===
On July 15, 2015, Hackett signed a two-year contract with the Greek club Olympiacos. With Olympiacos, he won the 2016 Greek League championship.

=== Brose Bamberg (2017–2018) ===
On July 5, 2017, Hackett signed a two-year contract with German club Brose Bamberg.

=== CSKA Moscow (2018–2022) ===
After one season, he parted ways with Brose and signed with the Russian club CSKA Moscow on July 17, 2018. On February 13, 2020, he signed a two-year contract extension with CSKA. With CSKA, Hackett won the club's eighth EuroLeague title in 2019.

Hackett terminated the contract with CSKA in February 2022 due to the country's invasion of Ukraine. Hackett paid CSKA $100,000 to free himself.

=== Virtus Bologna (2022–present) ===
Hackett signed with Virtus Bologna of the Italian Lega Basket Serie A in 2022. After having ousted Lietkabelis, Ulm and Valencia in the first three rounds of the playoffs, on 11 May 2022, Virtus defeated Frutti Extra Bursaspor by 80–67 at the Segafredo Arena, winning its first EuroCup and qualifying for the EuroLeague after 14 years. However, despite having ended the regular season at the first place and having ousted 3–0 both Pesaro and Tortona in the first two rounds of playoffs, Virtus was defeated 4–2 in the national finals by Olimpia Milan.

On 29 September 2022, after having ousted Milano in the semifinals, Virtus won its third Supercup, defeating 72–69 Banco di Sardegna Sassari and achieving a back-to-back, following the 2021 trophy. However, Hackett did not play due to an injury. However, despite good premises Virtus ended the EuroLeague season at the 14th place, thus it did not qualify for the playoffs. Moreover, the team was defeated in the Italian Basketball Cup final by Brescia. In June, after having ousted 3–0 both Brindisi and Tortona, Virtus was defeated 4–3 by Olimpia Milan in the national finals, following a series which was widely regarded among the best in the latest years of Italian basketball.

On 24 September 2023, after having ousted Olimpia Milano in the semifinals, Virtus won its fourth Supercup, and the third in a row, defeating 97–60 Germani Brescia. Despite an impressive first half of the season, Virtus ended the EuroLeague regular season at the 10th place, qualifying only for the play-in, where after having defeated 67–64 Anadolu Efes, it lost against Baskonia 89–77, not qualifying for the playoffs. Moreover, the Black V placed first during the Italian regular season but, after having knocked out Tortona by 3–2 and Reyer Venezia by 3–1, it lost the third consecutive final against Milan by 3–1.

In the following season Virtus ended the EuroLeague at the 17th place, after a disappointing regular season. After arriving first in the national championship season, Virtus eliminated Venezia 3–2 and their arch-rival Milan 3–1, reaching their fifth finals in a row. They then defeated Brescia 3–0, claiming the Italian championship title for the 17th time. For Hackett, this was the second scudetto of his career.

== International career ==
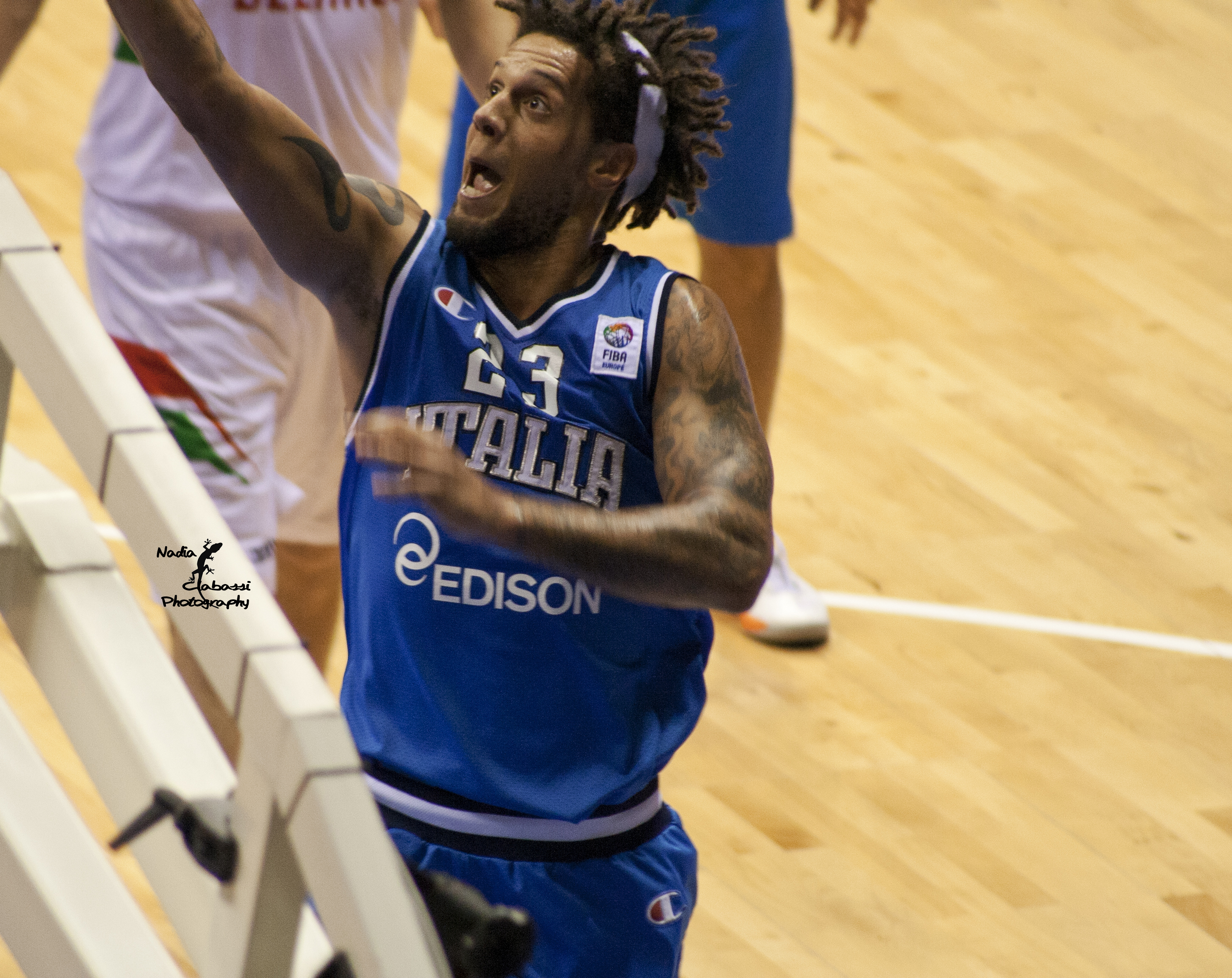
Daniel Hackett as a member of the senior Italian national team in 2012.

Hackett played with the Italian junior national teams. With Italy's junior national team, he played at the 2007 FIBA Europe Under-20 Championship, where he won a bronze medal. He averaged 9.1 points, 3.9 rebounds, and 2.0 assists per game at that tournament.

Hackett was then a member of the senior men's Italian national basketball team at the EuroBasket 2011, in Lithuania. He was also a member of the senior Italian national team that took part in EuroBasket 2015, which started on 5 September. He also played at the 2016 Turin FIBA World Olympic Qualifying Tournament.

== Career statistics ==
Legend
GP	Games played	GS	Games started	MPG	Minutes per game
FG%	Field-goal percentage	3P%	3-point field-goal percentage	FT%	Free-throw percentage
RPG	Rebounds per game	APG	Assists per game	SPG	Steals per game
BPG	Blocks per game	PPG	Points per game	PIR	Performance index rating
**Bold**	Career high

=== EuroLeague ===
†	Denotes seasons in which Hackett won the EuroLeague

Year	Team	GP	GS	MPG	FG%	3P%	FT%	RPG	APG	SPG	BPG	PPG	PIR
2012–13	Mens Sana	22	2	22.1	.414	.311	.722	2.3	3.0	1.0	.0	7.2	8.7
2013–14	Mens Sana	9	9	**33.6**	.427	.409	.745	**4.2**	**5.8**	1.0	—	**13.3**	**19.4**
2013–14	Milano	18	17	26.9	.377	.321	.724	3.5	3.6	**1.3**	**.1**	9.7	11.6
2014–15	Milano	24	20	28.7	.390	.250	.658	3.7	4.6	.8	.0	10.5	11.8
2015–16	Olympiacos	24	0	19.8	.444	.393	.813	2.3	2.3	.8	**.1**	8.1	9.0
2016–17	Olympiacos	11	0	14.5	.354	.267	.773	1.5	1.6	.5	—	5.0	5.5
2017–18	Bamberg	26	11	24.0	**.497**	.369	.808	2.7	3.4	.4	—	9.6	11.8
2018–19†	CSKA Moscow	**35**	26	17.3	.434	.392	.825	1.8	1.7	.6	.0	6.0	6.3
2019–20	CSKA Moscow	23	9	20.0	.418	.442	.806	2.6	2.7	1.0	—	8.3	8.4
2020–21	CSKA Moscow	29	23	24.1	.449	**.453**	**.848**	2.7	2.3	1.0	.0	9.5	10.9
2021–22	CSKA Moscow	22	8	21.5	.448	.403	.786	1.9	2.6	.8	.0	8.5	9.0
2022–23	Bologna	32	**31**	21.9	.496	.397	.758	2.1	2.9	.6	**.1**	6.4	8.0
2023–24	Bologna	32	29	24.1	.440	.393	.803	3.3	3.6	.9	**.1**	8.1	10.7
Career		32	29	24.1	.440	.393	.803	3.3	3.6	.9	.1	8.1	10.7
