= Michele Ruzzier =

Italian basketball player

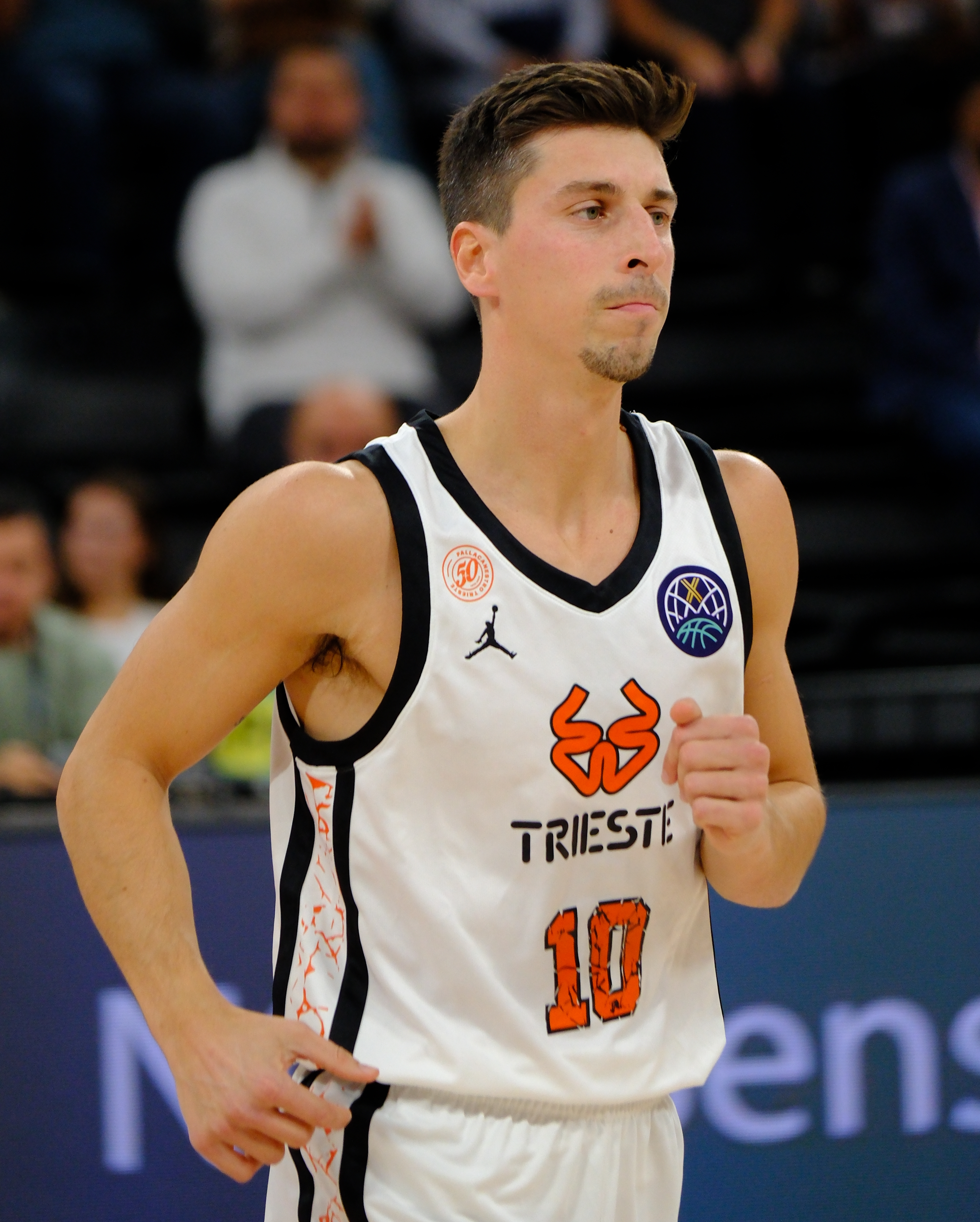
- Ruzzier with Pallacanestro Trieste in 2025

No. 10 – Pallacanestro Trieste
- Position: Point guard
- League: LBA

Personal information
- Born: February 9, 1993 (age 33) Trieste, Italy
- Listed height: 1.83 m (6 ft 0 in)
- Listed weight: 80 kg (176 lb)

Career information
- Playing career: 2011–present

Career history
- 2011–2014: Pallacanestro Trieste
- 2014–2017: Reyer Venezia
- 2016–2017: → Fortitudo Bologna
- 2017–2020: Vanoli Cremona
- 2020–2021: Varese
- 2021–2022: Virtus Bologna
- 2022–present: Pallacanestro Trieste

Career highlights
- EuroCup champion (2022); Italian Cup winner (2019); 2× Italian Supercup winner (2021, 2022)
Medals
Men's basketball
Representing Italy
FIBA Europe Under-20 Championship
Gold medal – first place	2013 Tallinn	National Team

Michele Ruzzier (born February 9, 1993) is an Italian professional basketball player for Pallacanestro Trieste of the Italian Lega Basket Serie A (LBA). He has also represented the Italian national team. Ruzzier plays at the point guard position.

== Professional career ==
Ruzzier started playing for Azzurra Trieste in his native town, moving in 2010 to Pallacanestro Trieste, playing in the third division, to play for their Under 19 squad.

Following injuries for the regular starters, Ruzzier was called to the first squad in early 2011, he alternated between the first and the U19 squad for the rest of the season. The next season, he would cement his place in the first squad, playing an average of 20 minutes per game as Trieste was promoted to Legadue.

In 2013-14 the team finished above the relegation spots, Ruzzier was instrumental in the feat, one of the few starting Italian point guards, he improved all his personal stats on his way to a selection for the Legadue All-Star game in the squad coached by his club coach Eugenio Dalmasson.

The higher exposure and level of play helped him achieve his lifelong goal, join a Serie A club, signing for the 2014-15 season with Dalmasson's former side Umana Reyer Venezia in neighbouring Veneto, the move was facilitated by a partnership between the two clubs.

In July 2015, his contract with Reyer was extended for another season.

Unfortunately, at the end of the 2019-20 season, after three seasons played with Cremona, he was released due to the club's financial problems. He, then, signed a one-year contract with Pallacanestro Varese with an option for the season 2021-22.

He resigned from Varese at the end of the 2020–21 season, to sign a two-year deal with Virtus Bologna on 5 July 2021. On 21 September 2021, the team won its second Supercup, defeating Olimpia Milano 90–84. Moreover, after having ousted Lietkabelis, Ulm and Valencia in the first three rounds of the playoffs, on 11 May 2022, Virtus defeated Frutti Extra Bursaspor by 80–67 at the Segafredo Arena, winning its first EuroCup and qualifying for the EuroLeague after 14 years. However, despite having ended the regular season at the first place and having ousted 3–0 both Pesaro and Tortona in the first two rounds of playoffs, Virtus was defeated 4–2 in the national finals by Olimpia Milan. On 29 September 2022, after having ousted Milano in the semifinals, Virtus won its third Supercup, defeating 72–69 Banco di Sardegna Sassari and achieving a back-to-back, following the 2021 trophy.

== International career ==
Ruzzier started playing for the Italian Under-20 side in 2013, he was a starter at the 2013 European Championship as Italy won the title.

== Player profile ==
As a point guard, Ruzzier focuses on tempo management and playmaking through passing. He frequently engages in pick-and-roll sequences and primarily operates as a perimeter shooter, though he also drives to the basket.

== Personal ==
As his father played basketball, in the amateur 4th division, Ruzzier was drawn to the sport, another basketball connection in his family is his uncle, coach Matteo Boniciolli.
