= Leo Menalo =

Italian basketball player (born 2002)

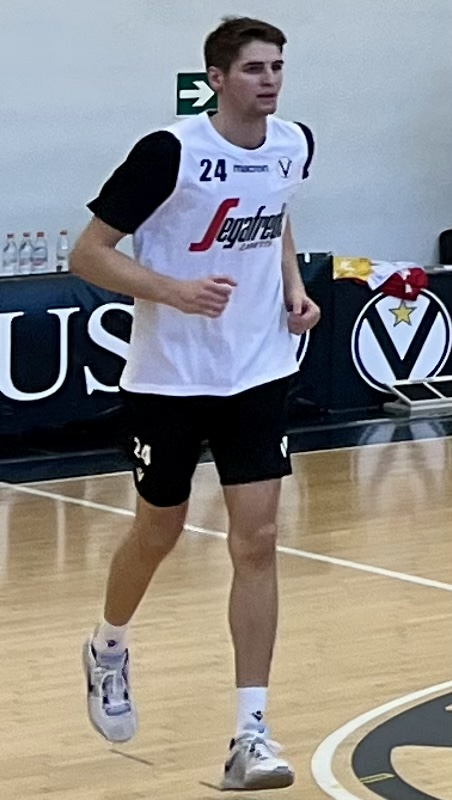
- Menalo in 2022

No. 24 – Virtus Bologna
- Position: Power forward
- League: LBA; EuroLeague

Personal information
- Born: 6 January 2002 (age 24) Zagreb, Croatia
- Listed height: 2.08 m (6 ft 10 in)
- Listed weight: 95 kg (209 lb)

Career information
- Playing career: 2018–present

Career history
- 2018–2022: Stella Azzurra Roma
- 2022–present: Virtus Bologna
- 2024: → Pallacanestro Trieste
- 2024–2025: → Fortitudo Bologna

Career highlights
- 2× Italian Supercup winner (2022, 2023)

Leo Menalo (born 6 January 2002) is a Croatian professional basketball player for Virtus Bologna of the Italian Lega Basket Serie A. Due to his Italian upbringing, he is considered a "homegrown player" in the domestic championship.

== Professional career ==
=== Stella Azzurra Roma (2018–2022) ===
After having played in the youth teams of KK Cibona, Menalo moved to A.S. Stella Azzurra of Rome in 2018, where he initially played in the youth teams. With Stella Azzurra, Menalo played in Serie A2, the second-tier league of Italian basketball.

=== Virtus Bologna (2022–present) ===
On 2 August 2022, Menalo signed a four-year deal with Virtus Bologna, of the Italian Lega Basket Serie A (LBA) and the EuroLeague, one of the most important teams in Europe. On 29 September 2022, after having ousted Olimpia Milano in the semifinals, Virtus won its third Supercup, defeating 72–69 Banco di Sardegna Sassari and achieving a back-to-back, following the 2021 trophy. However, despite good premises Virtus ended the EuroLeague season at the 14th place, thus it did not qualify for the playoffs. Moreover, the team was defeated in the Italian Basketball Cup final by Brescia. In June, after having ousted 3–0 both Brindisi and Tortona, Virtus was defeated 4–3 by Olimpia Milan in the national finals, following a series which was widely regarded among the best in the latest years of Italian basketball.

On 24 September 2023, after having ousted Olimpia Milano in the semifinals, Virtus won its fourth Supercup, and the third in a row, defeating 97–60 Germani Brescia.

== Career statistics ==
Legend
GP	Games played	GS	Games started	MPG	Minutes per game
FG%	Field-goal percentage	3P%	3-point field-goal percentage	FT%	Free-throw percentage
RPG	Rebounds per game	APG	Assists per game	SPG	Steals per game
BPG	Blocks per game	PPG	Points per game	PIR	Performance index rating
**Bold**	Career high

=== EuroLeague ===
Year	Team	GP	GS	MPG	FG%	3P%	FT%	RPG	APG	SPG	BPG	PPG	PIR
2022–23	Bologna	1	0	1.0	—	—	—	—	—	—	—	0.0	0.0
Career		1	0	1.0	—	—	—	—	—	—	—	0.0	0.0
