= Gabriel Lundberg =

Danish basketball player (born 1994)

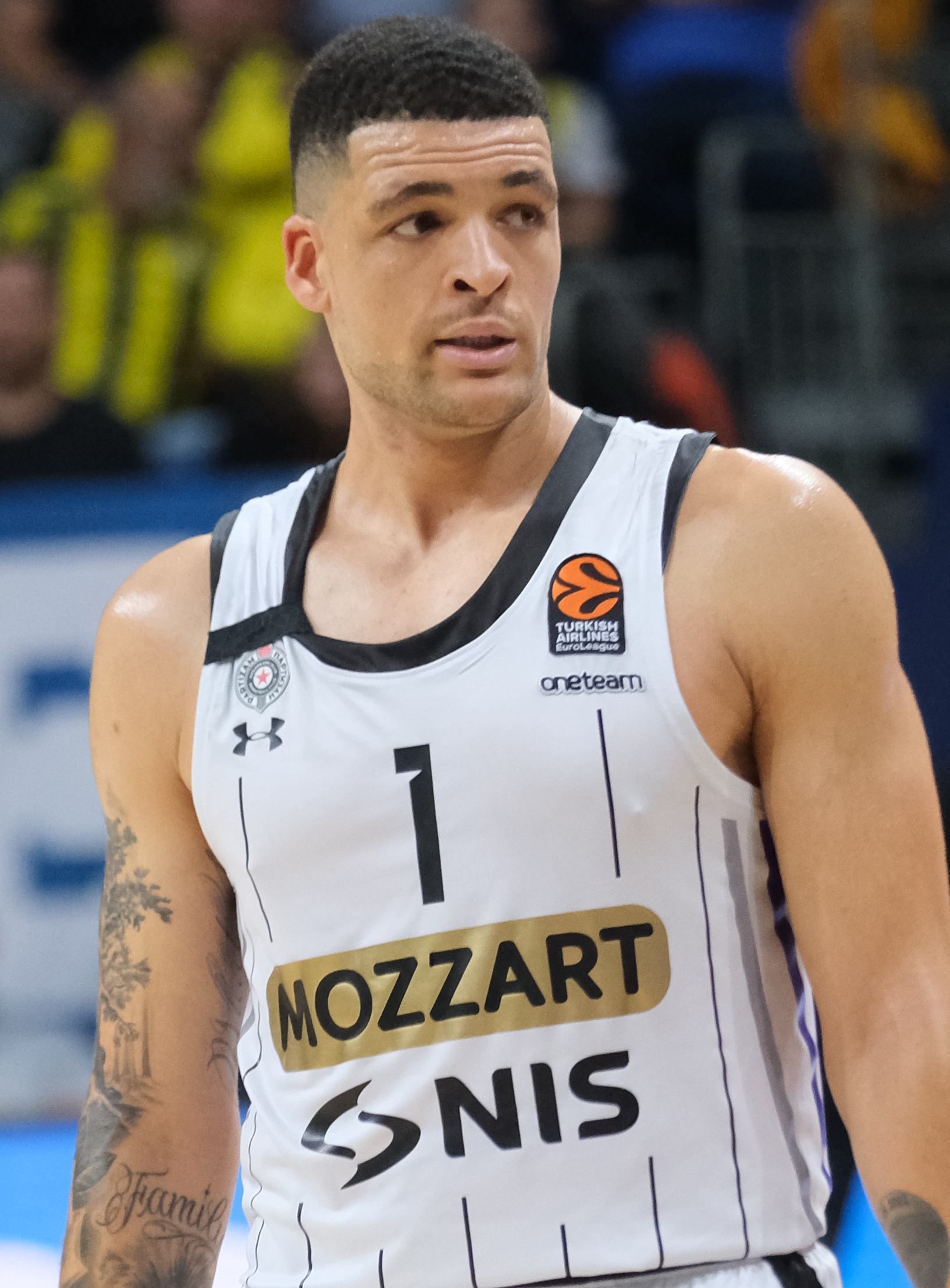
- Lundberg with Partizan in 2024

No. 0 – Maccabi Tel Aviv
- Position: Shooting guard / point guard
- League: Israeli Basketball Premier League; EuroLeague

Personal information
- Born: 4 December 1994 (age 31) Copenhagen, Denmark
- Listed height: 1.93 m (6 ft 4 in)
- Listed weight: 92 kg (203 lb)

Career information
- NBA draft: 2016: undrafted
- Playing career: 2013–present

Career history
- 2013–2014: Falcon
- 2014–2015: Herlev Wolfpack
- 2015–2017: Horsens
- 2017–2019: Manresa
- 2019–2020: Tenerife
- 2020–2021: Zielona Góra
- 2021–2022: CSKA Moscow
- 2022: Phoenix Suns
- 2022–2024: Virtus Bologna
- 2024–2025: Partizan
- 2025–present: Maccabi Tel Aviv

Career highlights
- FIBA Intercontinental Cup champion (2020); Israeli Premier League champion (2026); Israeli League Finals MVP (2026); VTB United League champion (2021); VTB United League Supercup winner (2021); VTB United League Newcomer of The Year (2021); ABA League champion (2025); Basketligaen champion (2016); Polish Cup winner (2021); Polish Supercup winner (2020); All-PLK Team (2021); Polish Cup MVP (2021); 2× Italian Supercup winner (2022, 2023); Lega Serie A Sixth Man of the Year (2024)
- Stats at NBA.com
- Stats at Basketball Reference

Gabriel Ifeanyi "Iffe" Lundberg (born 4 December 1994) is a Danish professional basketball player for Maccabi Tel Aviv of the Israeli Basketball Premier League and the EuroLeague. He also represents the Denmark national team. Standing at 1.93 m (6 ft 4 in), he can play at both guard positions. According to numerous Danish outlets, Lundberg is Denmark's best basketball player.

== Professional career ==
=== Early career (2013–2019) ===
Lundberg started his professional basketball career in the Danish Basketligaen playing for Falcon (2013–14), BMS Herlev Wolfpack (2014–15) and Horsens (2015–2017), before moving to Spanish LEB Oro team Manresa. He helped Manresa return to the Liga ACB in his first season.

=== Canarias (2019–2020) ===
In July 2019, Lundberg signed with CB Canarias for two years with the option of a third. He joined the team from the competitor Bàsquet Manresa where he had been a cornerstone of the team that won promotion to the Liga ACB.

=== Zielona Góra (2020–2021) ===
On 13 July 2020, Lundberg signed with Stelmet Zielona Góra of the Polish League. He averaged 20.4 points, 3.8 rebounds, 5.4 assists and 1.4 steals per game in the VTB United League during the 2020–21 season.

=== CSKA Moscow (2021–2022) ===
On February 15, 2021, he left Zielona Gora and signed with CSKA Moscow for the rest of the season. On July 2, 2021, Lundberg signed a three-year (2+1) extension with the Russian club.

On February 27, 2022, upon the outbreak of the 2022 Russian invasion of Ukraine, he left the team. The team accused him of violating his contract.

=== Phoenix Suns (2022) ===
On March 12, 2022, the Phoenix Suns signed Lundberg to a two-way contract for the rest of the 2021–22 season. He subsequently became the first Danish player in history to sign an NBA contract. However, he did not make his NBA debut until April 3 against the Oklahoma City Thunder due to visa issues that stemmed from the 2022 Russian invasion of Ukraine. In the final game of the regular season, Lundberg recorded season-highs of 10 points, 5 rebounds, and 5 assists in a loss to the Sacramento Kings.

=== Virtus Bologna (2022–2024) ===
On July 21, 2022, Lundberg signed a two-year deal with Virtus Bologna of the Italian Lega Basket Serie A (LBA) and the EuroLeague. On 29 September 2022, after having ousted Olimpia Milano in the semifinals, Virtus won its third Supercup, defeating 72–69 Banco di Sardegna Sassari and achieving a back-to-back, following the 2021 trophy. However, despite good premises Virtus ended the EuroLeague season at the 14th place, thus it did not qualify for the playoffs. Moreover, the team was defeated in the Italian Basketball Cup final by Brescia. In June, after having ousted 3–0 both Brindisi and Tortona, Virtus was defeated 4–3 by Olimpia Milan in the national finals, following a series which was widely regarded among the best in the latest years of Italian basketball.

On 24 September 2023, after having ousted Olimpia Milano in the semifinals, Virtus won its fourth Supercup, and the third in a row, defeating 97–60 Germani Brescia.

=== Partizan (2024–2025) ===
On June 20, 2024, Lundberg signed a two-year deal with Partizan Mozzart Bet of the Basketball League of Serbia (KLS), ABA League and the EuroLeague. During the 2024–25 season, Partizan managed to lift the record eighth ABA League championship, and the Serbian League championship, the first one after 11 seasons. On November 8, 2025, Lundberg left the team after not playing at all during the 2025–2026 season.

=== Maccabi Tel Aviv (2025–present) ===
Lundberg with Maccabi Tel Aviv in 2026

On November 10, 2025, Lundberg joined Maccabi Tel Aviv B.C. after parting ways with Partizan, but he came in to the season with a minor injury so he was unable to start right away. In July 2026, Lundberg reached an agreement with the team on a new three-year contract. On October 20, 2026, Lundberg suffered an injury during practice to his quadriceps tendon that would sideline him for 6 to 8 weeks.

== National team ==
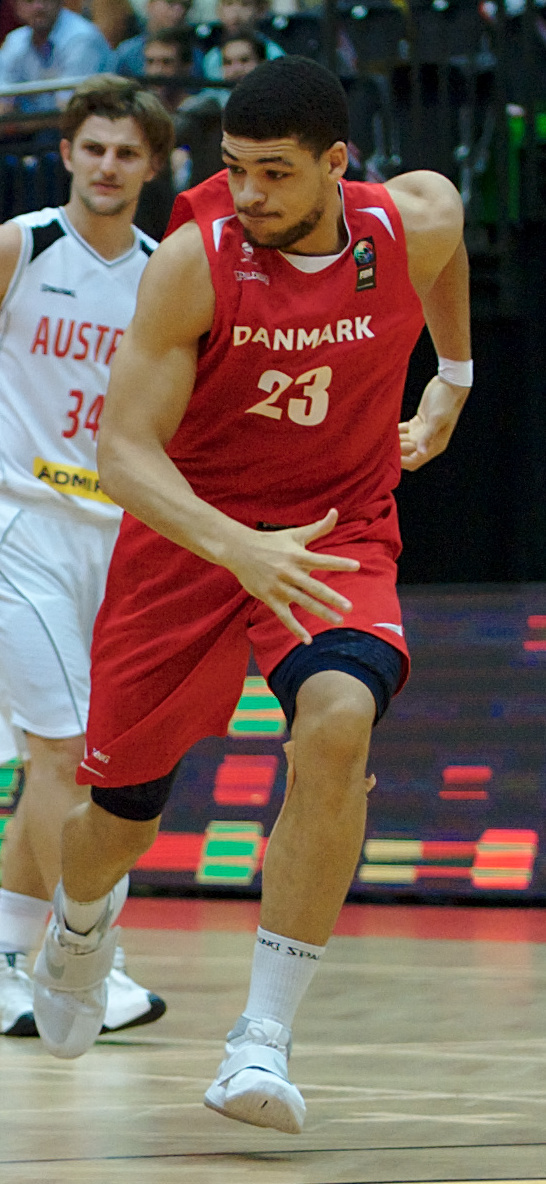
Lundberg, 2016.

Lundberg has been a member of the Denmark men's national basketball team. In November 2020, he led the team to two consecutive surprise victories against favorites Lithuania and the Czech Republic in the qualification round to the European championships. Lundberg had 28 points in the win against Lithuania which was named arguably the greatest victory in Danish basketball history. Against the Czech team, he scored 38 points, knocking down 7-of-9 from three-point range.

== Personal life ==
Lundberg is a native of Copenhagen. He is of Nigerian and Danish descent. In the early years, he played 3x3 streetball at the local street courts in Vesterbro, the Copenhagen neighborhood in which he grew up. He was a regular at the GAME Finals Streetball Tournament at the Town Hall Square each summer and watched from the stands, when his older brother Abdel Jaleel Lundberg competed in the Elite Division and the Slam Dunk Contest, winning it several times. Iffe later joined Falcon Basketball Club where he played during most of his childhood. In the off-season Iffe would come back to play streetball and won in 2009 2nd place at the GAME Finals Streetball Tournament with his team.

== Career statistics ==
Legend
GP	Games played	GS	Games started	MPG	Minutes per game
FG%	Field-goal percentage	3P%	3-point field-goal percentage	FT%	Free-throw percentage
RPG	Rebounds per game	APG	Assists per game	SPG	Steals per game
BPG	Blocks per game	PPG	Points per game	PIR	Performance index rating
**Bold**	Career high

=== NBA ===
Year	Team	GP	GS	MPG	FG%	3P%	FT%	RPG	APG	SPG	BPG	PPG
2021–22	Phoenix	4	0	11.0	.263	.375	—	1.8	2.8	.8	.0	3.3
Career		4	0	11.0	.263	.375	—	1.8	2.8	.8	.0	3.3

=== EuroLeague ===
Year	Team	GP	GS	MPG	FG%	3P%	FT%	RPG	APG	SPG	BPG	PPG	PIR
2020–21	CSKA Moscow	15	2	20.1	**.564**	**.436**	.583	**2.5**	2.2	**.9**	—	11.3	**11.6**
2021–22	CSKA Moscow	24	16	**21.1**	.446	.338	.833	2.4	2.0	**.9**	.0	9.1	8.0
2022–23	Virtus Bologna	29	**22**	20.6	.433	.297	**.860**	2.2	2.0	.7	—	**11.4**	10.2
2023–24	Virtus Bologna	**35**	1	19.3	.447	.336	.729	2.1	2.0	.6	.0	9.4	8.5
2024–25	Partizan	26	14	14.9	.347	.346	.800	2.2	**3.0**	**.9**	.0	7.9	7.3
Career		129	55	21.2	.439	.343	.775	2.2	2.2	.8	.0	9.0	8.5
