= Kyle Weems =

American basketball player (born 1989)

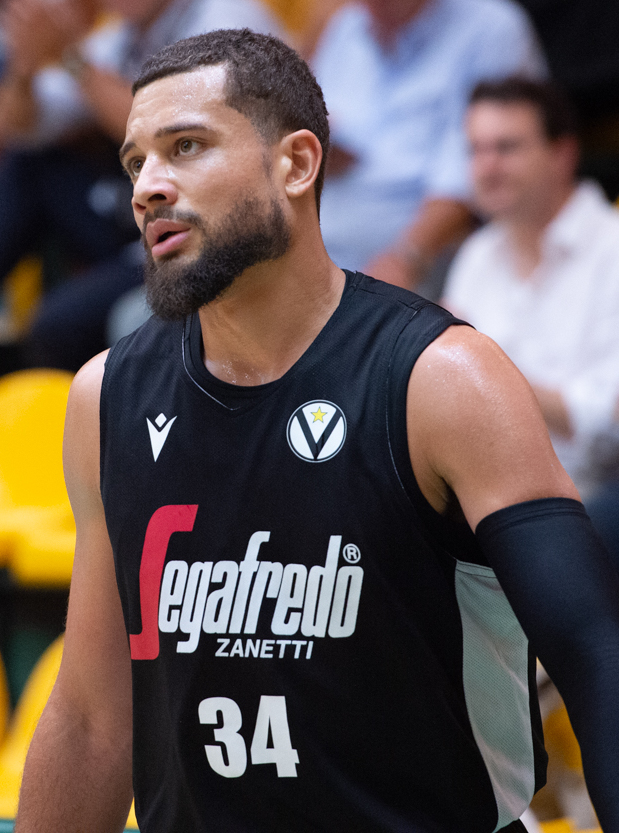
- Weems in September 2019

Free agent
- Position: Small forward

Personal information
- Born: August 23, 1989 (age 37) Topeka, Kansas, U.S.
- Listed height: 6 ft 6 in (1.98 m)
- Listed weight: 220 lb (100 kg)

Career information
- High school: Highland Park (Topeka, Kansas)
- College: Missouri State (2008–2012)
- NBA draft: 2012: undrafted
- Playing career: 2012–present

Career history
- 2012–2013: Telekom Baskets Bonn
- 2013–2014: Medi Bayreuth
- 2014–2015: JSF Nanterre
- 2015–2016: Strasbourg
- 2016–2018: Beşiktaş
- 2018–2019: Tofaş
- 2019–2023: Virtus Bologna
- 2023–2025: Derthona Basket

Career highlights
- EuroCup champion (2022); Italian League champion (2021); 2x Italian Supercup winner (2021, 2022); EuroChallenge champion (2015); Match des Champions MVP (2014); MVC Player of the Year (2011); AP Honorable Mention All-American (2011)

Kyle Jordan Weems (born August 23, 1989) is an American professional basketball player who last played for Derthona Basket of the Italian LBA. He played collegiately for Missouri State University and was named Missouri Valley Conference Men's Basketball Player of the Year and an All-American in 2011.

== College career ==
Weems, a 6 ft 6 in (1.98 m) forward from Topeka, Kansas, came to Missouri State in 2007. He redshirted the 2007–08 season and played his freshman season in 2008–09 season. As a freshman, Weems started 19 games and averaged 10.2 points and 4.9 rebounds per game and was named to the Missouri Valley Conference (MVC) all-freshman team. As a sophomore, Weems helped lead the Bears to the 2010 CollegeInsider.com Tournament (CIT) championship as he averaged 13.6 points and 6.2 rebounds per game. In the CIT final, Weems scored 14 points, grabbed eight rebounds and blocked four shots against Pacific.

In his junior season, Weems became a force in the MVC. He upped his averages to 16.0 points and 6.8 rebounds per game and led the Bears to their first MVC regular season championship. At the end of the season, Weems was named the MVC Player of the Year and an Associated Press honorable mention All-American — the first player so honored in MSU's Division I history. The Bears played in the 2011 National Invitation Tournament, defeating Murray State in the first round before falling to Miami in the second round.

Prior to the start of his senior season, Weems was named to the preseason candidate list for the Lowe's Senior CLASS Award. He was also named the preseason MVC Player of the Year.

== Professional career ==
=== Germany, France and Turkey (2012–2019) ===
Weems went undrafted in the 2012 NBA draft. On July 26, 2012, he signed his first professional contract with Telekom Baskets Bonn in Germany's top professional league. On August 19, 2013, he signed with BBC Bayreuth.

On June 10, 2014, he signed with JSF Nanterre of the French LNB Pro A for the 2014–15 season.

On July 5, 2015, he signed with Strasbourg IG for the 2015–16 season.

On July 15, 2016, Weems signed a 1+1 deal with Turkish team Beşiktaş. In the 2017–18 season he averaged 8.6 points per game. Weems signed with Tofaş S.K. on July 10, 2018.

=== Virtus Bologna (2019–2023) ===
On July 20, 2019, he signed with Virtus Bologna of the Italian Lega Basket Serie A (LBA). On April 7, 2020, after more than a month of suspension, the Italian Basketball Federation officially ended the 2019–20 season, due to the coronavirus pandemic that severely hit Italy. Virtus ended the season first, with 18 wins and only 2 defeats, but the title was not assigned. On May 5, the EuroCup season ended too.

In the following season, in April 2021, despite a winning record of 19–2, Virtus was defeated in the EuroCup's semifinals by UNICS Kazan. However, the season ended with a great success. In fact, after having knocked out 3–0 both Basket Treviso in the quarterfinals and New Basket Brindisi in the semifinals, on 11 June Virtus defeated 4–0 its historic rival Olimpia Milano in the national finals, winning its 16th national title and the first one after twenty years. On 30 June, Weems signed another two-year deal with Virtus.

On September 21, the team won its second Supercup, defeating Olimpia Milano 90–84. Moreover, after having ousted Lietkabelis, Ulm and Valencia in the first three rounds of the playoffs, on 11 May 2022, Virtus defeated Frutti Extra Bursaspor by 80–67 at the Segafredo Arena, winning its first EuroCup and qualifying for the EuroLeague after 14 years. However, despite having ended the regular season at the first place and having ousted 3–0 both Pesaro and Tortona in the first two rounds of playoffs, Virtus was defeated 4–2 in the national finals by Olimpia Milan.

On 29 September 2022, after having ousted Milano in the semifinals, Virtus won its third Supercup, defeating 72–69 Banco di Sardegna Sassari and achieving a back-to-back, following the 2021 trophy. However, despite good premises Virtus ended the EuroLeague season at the 14th place, thus it did not qualify for the playoffs. Moreover, the team was defeated in the Italian Basketball Cup final by Brescia. In June, after having ousted 3–0 both Brindisi and Tortona, Virtus was defeated 4–3 by Olimpia Milan in the national finals, following a series which was widely regarded among the best in the latest years of Italian basketball.

=== Derthona Basket (2023–2025) ===
On July 11, 2023, he signed with Derthona Basket of the Italian LBA.
