= 2022 Italian Basketball Supercup =

2022 basketball tournament in Italy

2022 Frecciarossa Supercoppa

Tournament details
- Arena: PalaLeonessa; Brescia, Lombardy, Italy
- Dates: 28–29 September 2022

Final positions
- Champions: Virtus Segafredo Bologna (3rd title)
- Runners-up: Banco di Sardegna Sassari

Awards and statistics
- MVP: (United States) Semi Ojeleye

The 2022 Italian Basketball Supercup (Italian: Supercoppa di pallacanestro 2022), also known as Frecciarossa Supercoppa 2022 for sponsorship reasons, is the 28th edition of the super cup tournament, organized by the Lega Basket Serie A (LBA). The title was won by Virtus Segafredo Bologna, which defeated 72–69 Banco di Sardegna Sassari, achieving a back-to-back following the 2021 title.

== Participant teams ==
Team	Home city	Head coach
EA7 Emporio Armani Milano	Milan	(Italy) Ettore Messina
Banco di Sardegna Sassari	Sassari	(Italy) Piero Bucchi
Bertram Yachts Derthona Tortona	Tortona	(Italy) Marco Ramondino
Virtus Segafredo Bologna	Bologna	(Italy) Sergio Scariolo

== Final Four ==
Semifinals; 28 September
1	EA7 Emporio Armani Milano	64
4	Virtus Segafredo Bologna	72
2	Bertram Yachts Derthona Tortona	83
3	Banco di Sardegna Sassari	84

Final; 29 September
1	Virtus Segafredo Bologna	72
3	Banco di Sardegna Sassari	69

== Semifinals ==
=== Bertram Yachts Derthona Tortona vs. Banco di Sardegna Sassari ===
28 September 2022	Bertram Yachts Derthona Tortona	83–84	Banco di Sardegna Sassari	Brescia
18:00 (CEST)	Scoring by quarter: 23–19, 21–25, 19–17, 20–23
Eurosport, Eleven Sports	Pts: Christon 25; Rebs: Cain 10; Asts: Christon 4 PIR: Daum 26	Boxscore	Pts: Bendžius 23; Rebs: Onuaku 6 Asts: Robinson 6 PIR: Bendžius 31	Arena: PalaLeonessa; Referees: Saverio Lanzarini, Tolga Sahin, Alessandro Martolini

=== EA7 Emporio Armani Milano vs. Virtus Segafredo Bologna ===
28 September 2022	EA7 Emporio Armani Milano	64–72(OT)	Virtus Segafredo Bologna	Brescia
20:45 (CEST)	Scoring by quarter: 12–8, 14–14, 12–14, 21–23, Overtime: 5–13
Eurosport, Eleven Sports	Pts: Hall 19; Rebs: Davies 5 Asts: Davies 3 PIR: Hines 13	Boxscore	Pts: Ojeleye 17; Rebs: Bako, Ojeleye 9 Asts: Pajola 5 PIR: Ojeleye 20	Arena: PalaLeonessa; Referees: Michele Rossi, Beniamino Attard, Guido Giovannetti

== Final ==
=== Banco di Sardegna Sassari vs. Virtus Segafredo Bologna ===
29 September 2022	Banco di Sardegna Sassari	69–72	Virtus Segafredo Bologna	Brescia
20:45 (CEST)	Scoring by quarter: 19–23, 30–20, 10–14, 10–15
Eurosport, Eleven Sports, DMAX	Pts: Onuaku 18; Rebs: Onuaku 9 Asts: Onuaku, Krušlin 4 PIR: Onuaku 31	Boxscore	Pts: Mickey 13; Rebs: Bako 7 Asts: Lundberg 6 PIR: Bako 17	Arena: PalaLeonessa; Referees: Manuel Mazzoni, Lorenzo Baldini, Andrea Bongiorgi

Starters:			Pts	Reb	Ast
PG	4	(United States) Gerald Robinson	6	1	2
SF	6	(Croatia) Filip Krušlin	3	4	4
SF	0	(United States) Jamal Jones	7	2	0
PF	20	(Lithuania) Eimantas Bendžius	15	7	1
C	32	(United States) Chinanu Onuaku	18	9	4
Reserves:					
G	5	(United States) Chris Dowe	8	6	3
C	7	(Italy) Luca Gandini	0	1	0
PG	22	(Italy) Stefano Gentile	5	1	3
G	23	(Italy) Tommaso Raspino	0	0	0
C	25	(United States) Ousmane Diop	7	4	1
Head coach:
(Italy) Piero Bucchi

Banco di Sardegna Sassari	Virtus Segafredo Bologna

Sassari	Statistics	Bologna
20/35 (57.1%)	2 point field goals	16/34 (47.1%)
5/23 (21.7%)	3 point field goals	9/29 (31.0%)
14/18 (77.8%)	Free throws	13/16 (81.3%)
37	Rebounds	32
18	Assists	15
6	Steals	6
17	Turnovers	17
2	Blocks	1

Starters:			Pts	Reb	Ast
PG	6	(Italy) Alessandro Pajola	4	1	4
SG	19	(Denmark) Gabriel Lundberg	6	4	6
SF	34	(United States) Kyle Weems	6	1	1
PF	37	(United States) Semi Ojeleye	9	4	1
C	25	(United States) Jordan Mickey	13	6	0
Reserves:					
SF	00	(France) Isaïa Cordinier	12	4	1
PG	1	(Italy) Nico Mannion	0	1	1
SG	3	(Italy) Marco Belinelli	12	1	0
C	7	(Belgium) Ismaël Bako	10	7	1
PG	11	(Italy) Michele Ruzzier	DNP		
PF	24	(Croatia) Leo Menalo	DNP		
C	29	(Senegal) Gora Camara	0	0	0
Head coach:
(Italy) Sergio Scariolo

2022 Italian Supercup champions
Virtus Segafredo Bologna
3rd title

== Sponsors ==
- Frecciarossa (title sponsor)
- UnipolSai (presenting sponsor)
- Fastweb (technology partner)
- Molten (official ball)
- PokerStars (platinum sponsor)
