= Gora Camara =

Senegalese basketball player (born 2001)

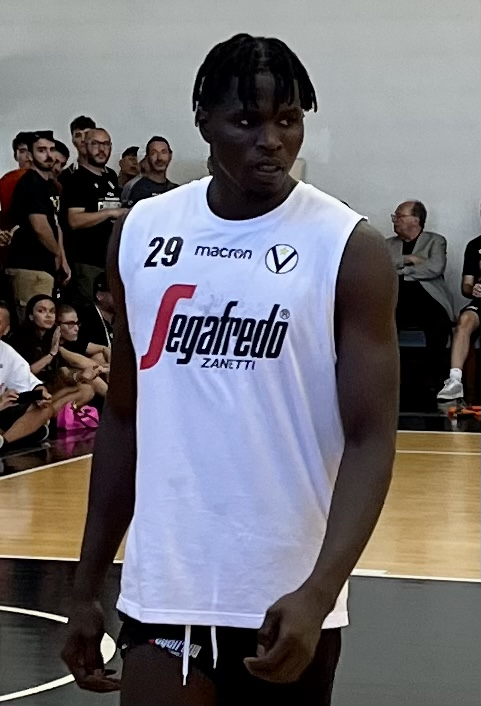
- Camara with Virtus Bologna in 2022

No. 29 – Maxima Roma
- Position: Center
- League: LBA; EuroCup

Personal information
- Born: April 12, 2001 (age 25) Dakar, Senegal
- Listed height: 2.14 m (7 ft 0 in)
- Listed weight: 114 kg (251 lb)

Career history
- 2018–2024: Virtus Bologna
- 2019–2021: →Junior Casale
- 2021–2022: →Pesaro
- 2023–2024: →Universo Treviso
- 2024–2026: Rinascita Basket Rimini
- 2026–present: Maxima Roma

Career highlights
- FIBA Champions League champion (2019); Italian Supercup winner (2022)
Medals
Men's basketball
Representing Senegal
AfroBasket
Bronze medal – third place	2025 Angola

Gora Camara (born April 12, 2001) is a Senegalese professional basketball player for Maxima Roma of the Italian Lega Basket Serie A (LBA) and the EuroCup. Due to his Italian upbringing, he is considered a "homegrown player" in the domestic championship.

== Professional career ==
=== Virtus Bologna (2018–present) ===
After having played in the youth teams of Virtus Bologna for several years, Camara was added to the first team in the 2018–19 season, during which he won the Basketball Champions League.

==== Loans to Casale and Pesaro (2019–2022) ====
In the 2019–20 season, Camara was loaned to Junior Casale Monferrato, a team of Italy's second league, Serie A2. Camara played in Monferrato also in the following season, until 2021. In the 2021–22 season, he was loaned to Pesaro of the LBA; along with Pesaro, he reached the national playoffs. However, Pesaro was ousted 3–0 by Virtus in the first round.

==== Return to Virtus (2022–2023) ====
On 3 August 2022, Camara returned to Virtus Bologna, where he played in the LBA and the EuroLeague. On 29 September 2022, after having ousted Olimpia Milano in the semifinals, Virtus won its third Supercup, defeating 72–69 Banco di Sardegna Sassari and achieving a back-to-back, following the 2021 trophy. However, despite good premises Virtus ended the EuroLeague season at the 14th place, thus it did not qualify for the playoffs. Moreover, the team was defeated in the Italian Basketball Cup final by Brescia. In June, after having ousted 3–0 both Brindisi and Tortona, Virtus was defeated 4–3 by Olimpia Milan in the national finals, following a series which was widely regarded among the best in the latest years of Italian basketball.

==== Loan to Treviso (2023–2024) ====
On July 14, 2023, Camara was loaned once again to Universo Treviso Basket of the Lega Basket Serie A.

== Career statistics ==
Legend
GP	Games played	GS	Games started	MPG	Minutes per game
FG%	Field-goal percentage	3P%	3-point field-goal percentage	FT%	Free-throw percentage
RPG	Rebounds per game	APG	Assists per game	SPG	Steals per game
BPG	Blocks per game	PPG	Points per game	PIR	Performance index rating
**Bold**	Career high

=== EuroLeague ===
Year	Team	GP	GS	MPG	FG%	3P%	FT%	RPG	APG	SPG	BPG	PPG	PIR
2022–23	Bologna	2	0	1.5	—	—	—	—	—	—	—	0.0	0.0
Career		2	0	1.5	—	—	—	—	—	—	—	0.0	0.0
