= Semi Ojeleye =

Nigerian-American basketball player (born 1994)

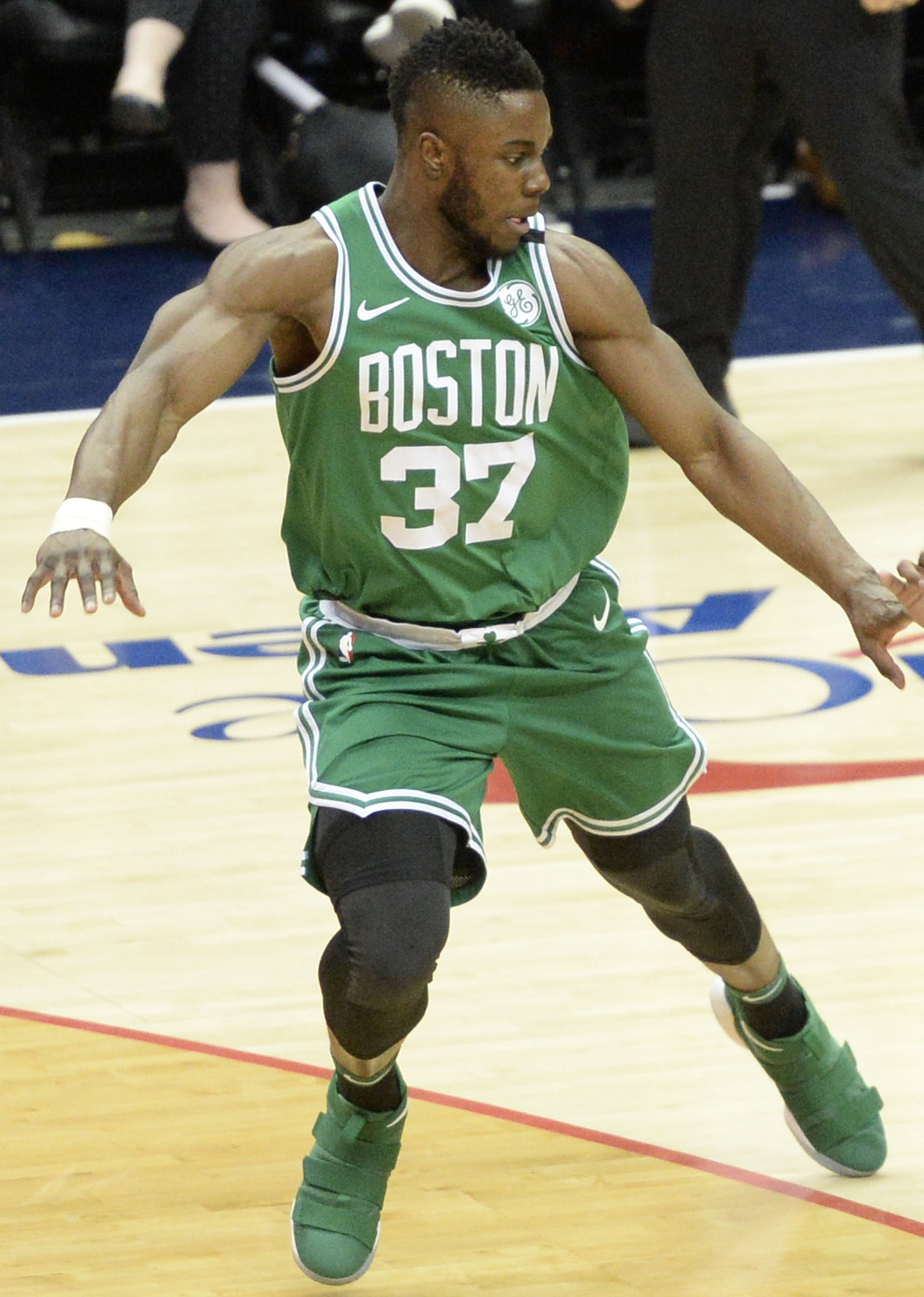
- Ojeleye with the Boston Celtics in 2018

No. 37 – Crvena zvezda Meridianbet
- Position: Small forward / power forward
- League: KLS; ABA League; EuroLeague

Personal information
- Born: December 5, 1994 (age 31) Overland Park, Kansas, U.S.
- Listed height: 1.98 m (6 ft 6 in)
- Listed weight: 109 kg (240 lb)

Career information
- High school: Ottawa (Ottawa, Kansas)
- College: Duke (2013–2015); SMU (2016–2017)
- NBA draft: 2017: 2nd round, 37th overall pick
- Drafted by: Boston Celtics
- Playing career: 2017–present

Career history
- 2017–2021: Boston Celtics
- 2021–2022: Milwaukee Bucks
- 2022: Los Angeles Clippers
- 2022–2023: Virtus Bologna
- 2023–2025: Valencia
- 2025–present: Crvena zvezda

Career highlights
- All-EuroCup Second Team (2025); Serbian Cup winner (2026); Italian Supercup winner (2022); Italian Supercup MVP (2022); AP Honorable mention All-American (2017); AAC Player of the Year (2017); First-team All-AAC (2017); AAC tournament MVP (2017); First-team Parade All-American (2013)
- Stats at NBA.com
- Stats at Basketball Reference

Jesusemilore Talodabijesu "Semi" Ojeleye (/ˈʃɛmi ˈoʊdʒəleɪ/ SHEM-ee OH-jə-lay; born December 5, 1994) is a Nigerian-American professional basketball player for Crvena zvezda of the Basketball League of Serbia (KLS), the ABA League, and the EuroLeague. He played college basketball for the Duke Blue Devils and SMU Mustangs.

== Early life and college career ==
Ojeleye's parents emigrated from Nigeria to Ottawa, Kansas. He starred at Ottawa High School and in 2013 was named the Parade Magazine National Player of the Year. He chose national power Duke for college, but played sparingly for two seasons. Looking for a larger role, he transferred to SMU, and in 2016–17 he led the team to both American Athletic Conference (AAC) regular season and Tournament Championships. Ojeleye averaged 18.9 points and 6.8 rebounds per game and was named AAC Player of the Year.

== Professional career ==
=== Boston Celtics (2017–2021) ===
Following the close of his redshirt junior season, Ojeleye entered his name for the 2017 NBA draft but did not hire an agent, leaving open the possibility of a return to the Mustangs. Ojeleye was invited to the 2017 NBA Draft Combine, one of 67 participants. After some promising performances he announced that he would commit to the draft, ending his college career. Ojeleye was chosen by the Boston Celtics in the second round with the 37th overall pick.

Ojeleye made his professional debut on October 17, 2017, in a 102–99 loss to the Cleveland Cavaliers. During the regular season, he averaged 2.7 points per game and shot 34.6 percent from the field, but emerged as a defensive presence. He started in Game 5 of the playoff series versus the Milwaukee Bucks and held Giannis Antetokounmpo to 16 points.

=== Milwaukee Bucks (2021–2022) ===
On August 6, 2021, Ojeleye signed with the Milwaukee Bucks on a one-year, veteran's minimum contract.

=== Los Angeles Clippers (2022) ===
On February 10, 2022, Ojeleye was traded to the Los Angeles Clippers as part of a four-team trade. On March 26, he was waived.

=== Virtus Bologna (2022–2023) ===
On July 28, 2022, Ojeleye signed a two-year deal with Virtus Bologna of the Italian Lega Basket Serie A (LBA) and the EuroLeague. On 29 September 2022, after having ousted Olimpia Milano in the semifinals, Virtus won its third Supercup, defeating 72–69 Banco di Sardegna Sassari and achieving a back-to-back, following the 2021 trophy. Ojeleye was nominated MVP of the competition.

However, despite good premises Virtus ended the EuroLeague season at the 14th place, thus it did not qualify for the playoffs. Moreover, the team was defeated in the Italian Basketball Cup final by Brescia. In June, after having ousted 3–0 both Brindisi and Tortona, Virtus was defeated 4–3 by Olimpia Milan in the national finals, following a series which was widely regarded among the best in the latest years of Italian basketball.

=== Valencia (2023–2025) ===
On July 1, 2023, Ojeleye's contract with Bologna was bought out by Spanish club Valencia for a sum of $300,000.

=== Crvena zvezda (2025–present) ===
On June 30, 2025, Ojeleye signed with Crvena zvezda of the ABA League.

== Career statistics ==
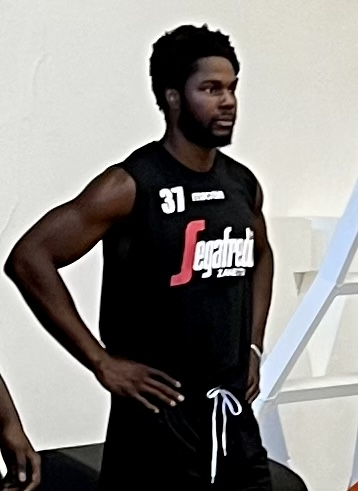
Ojeleye with Virtus Bologna in 2022

Legend
GP	Games played	GS	Games started	MPG	Minutes per game
FG%	Field-goal percentage	3P%	3-point field-goal percentage	FT%	Free-throw percentage
RPG	Rebounds per game	APG	Assists per game	SPG	Steals per game
BPG	Blocks per game	PPG	Points per game	PIR	Performance index rating
**Bold**	Career high

=== NBA ===
==== Regular season ====
Year	Team	GP	GS	MPG	FG%	3P%	FT%	RPG	APG	SPG	BPG	PPG
2017–18	Boston	**73**	0	15.8	.346	.320	.610	2.2	.3	**.3**	.1	2.7
2018–19	Boston	56	3	10.6	**.424**	.315	.615	1.5	.4	.2	.1	3.3
2019–20	Boston	69	6	14.7	.408	.378	**.875**	2.1	.5	**.3**	.1	3.4
2020–21	Boston	56	**15**	**17.0**	.403	.367	.750	2.6	**.7**	**.3**	.0	**4.6**
2021–22	Milwaukee	20	0	15.4	.257	.268	.769	**2.9**	.3	**.3**	**.3**	2.9
2021–22	L.A. Clippers	10	0	9.8	.414	**.444**	.813	1.6	.4	.2	.1	4.1
Career		284	24	14.5	.384	.344	.717	2.2	.4	.3	.1	3.4

==== Playoffs ====
Year	Team	GP	GS	MPG	FG%	3P%	FT%	RPG	APG	SPG	BPG	PPG
2018	Boston	**17**	**3**	**13.5**	.303	.273	.857	**1.6**	.1	.2	.0	1.9
2019	Boston	6	0	5.7	**.444**	**.600**	**1.000**	.3	**.3**	.0	.0	**2.2**
2020	Boston	13	0	9.4	.350	.217	**1.000**	.9	.1	.2	.0	1.6
2021	Boston	2	0	6.0	.000	.000	.500	.0	.0	**.5**	**.5**	.5
Career		38	3	10.5	.284	.264	.846	1.1	.1	.2	.1	1.8

=== EuroLeague ===
Year	Team	GP	GS	MPG	FG%	3P%	FT%	RPG	APG	SPG	BPG	PPG	PIR
2022–23	Bologna	24	**21**	**23.5**	**.530**	.461	**.870**	3.8	**.6**	.5	.1	10.5	10.8
2023–24	Valencia	**27**	12	22.2	.493	**.471**	.869	**4.4**	.4	**.8**	**.2**	**13.3**	**14.2**
Career		51	33	22.8	.509	.466	.869	4.2	.5	.7	.2	12.0	12.6

=== College ===
Year	Team	GP	GS	MPG	FG%	3P%	FT%	RPG	APG	SPG	BPG	PPG
2013–14	Duke	17	0	4.7	**.500**	**.571**	**.909**	.9	.1	.2	.2	1.6
2014–15	Duke	6	0	10.5	.278	.250	.571	2.3	.2	**.5**	.0	3.0
2016–17	SMU	**35**	**35**	**34.1**	.487	.424	.785	**6.9**	**1.5**	.4	**.4**	**19.0**
Career		58	35	23.1	.479	.415	.785	4.6	1.0	.4	.3	12.3
