= Nico Mannion =

Italian-American basketball player (born 2001)

- Mannion with BC Roma in 2026

No. 1 – BC Roma
- Position: Point guard
- League: LBA; EuroCup

Personal information
- Born: March 14, 2001 (age 25) Siena, Italy
- Listed height: 6 ft 3 in (1.91 m)
- Listed weight: 190 lb (86 kg)

Career information
- High school: Pinnacle (Phoenix, Arizona)
- College: Arizona (2019–2020)
- NBA draft: 2020: 2nd round, 48th overall pick
- Drafted by: Golden State Warriors
- Playing career: 2020–present

Career history
- 2020–2021: Golden State Warriors
- 2020–2021: →Santa Cruz Warriors
- 2021–2023: Virtus Bologna
- 2023: Baskonia
- 2023–2024: Varese
- 2024–2026: Olimpia Milano
- 2026–present: BC Roma

Career highlights
- EuroCup champion (2022); Lega Serie A Top Scorer (2024); Lega Serie A Domestic Player of the Year (2024); 2× Italian Supercup winner (2022, 2025); Second-team All-Pac-12 (2020); McDonald's All-American (2019)
- Stats at NBA.com
- Stats at Basketball Reference

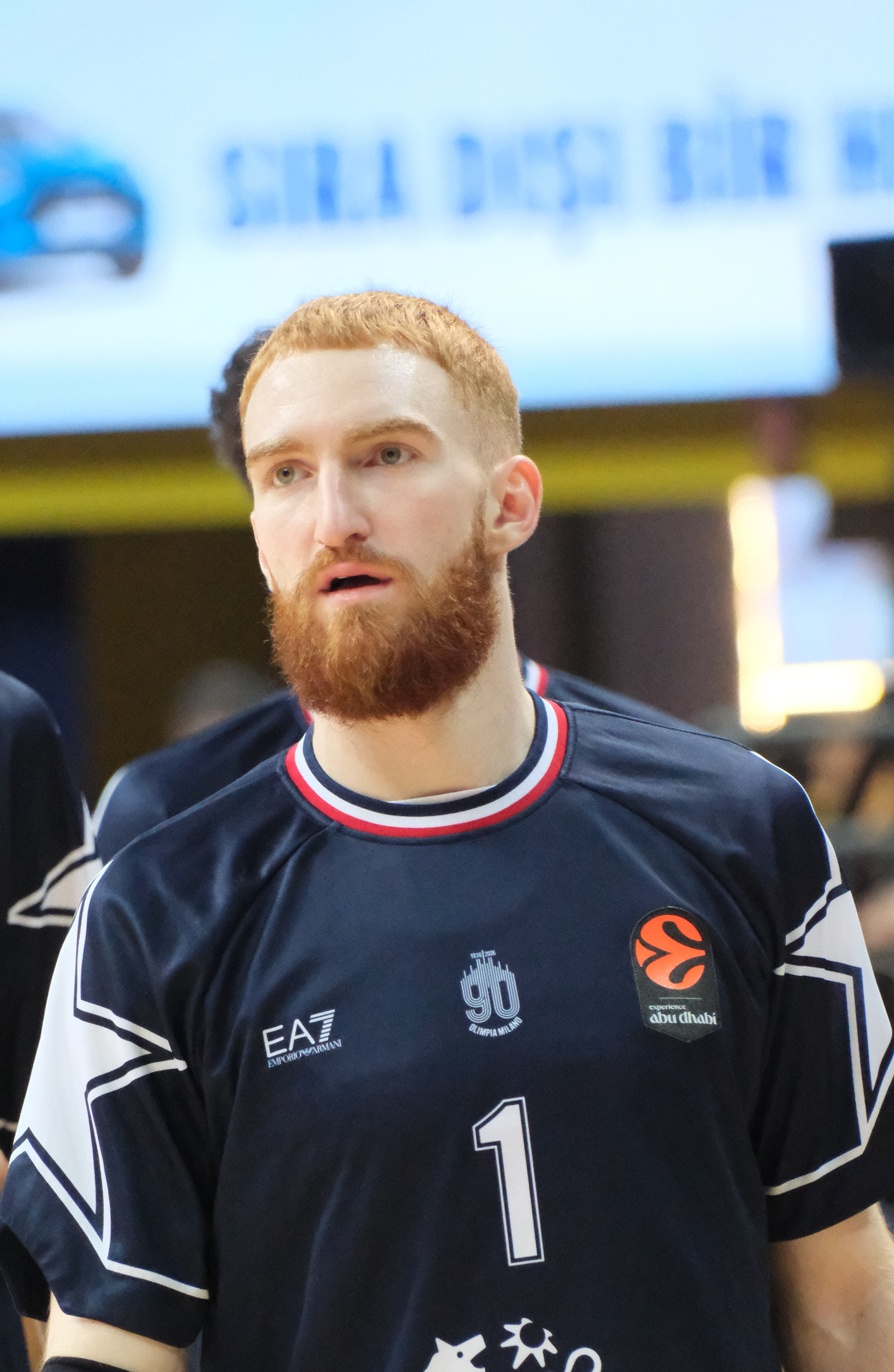
Mannion with Olimpia Milano in 2026

Niccolò "Nico" Mannion (born March 14, 2001) is an Italian-American professional basketball player for BC Roma of the Italian Lega Basket Serie A (LBA) and the EuroCup. He played college basketball for the Arizona Wildcats. He attended Pinnacle High School in Phoenix, Arizona, where he was a consensus five-star recruit and one of the top point guards in the 2019 class. Although he mainly grew up in the United States, Mannion represents his birth country of Italy in international competitions.

== Early life ==
Mannion was born in Siena, Tuscany, Italy, to former NBA player Pace Mannion and Gaia Bianchi. There, he spent his early childhood before his family moved to Salt Lake City, Utah, and finally settled in Phoenix, Arizona.

== High school career ==
As a freshman, Mannion began playing basketball for Pinnacle High School in Phoenix, Arizona under head coach Charlie Wilde. On February 9, 2017, he featured in a Sports Illustrated article, "A 15-Year-Old (Sorta-Maybe) Basketball Prodigy". Mannion started in all 28 of his games, averaging 20.2 points, 4.6 rebounds, 4.7 assists, and 2.4 steals per game while leading Pinnacle to a 22–6 record. He was named MaxPreps first team All-American and Arizona Republic Class 6A first team All-State. Entering his sophomore season, Mannion was named to the USA Today All-USA Arizona preseason team. He missed his first four games with a broken left hand. On February 28, 2018, Mannion scored 21 points in a 76–60 win over Mountain Pointe High School for the Class 6A state championship. He finished the season averaging 23.4 points, 4.7 rebounds, and 5.8 assists per game, leading Pinnacle to a 24–7 record. Mannion received MaxPreps Sophomore All-American third team and Arizona Gatorade Player of the Year distinction.

He took online summer courses to be able to graduate in the following spring. On December 1, Mannion scored 37 points, including the game-winning three-pointer, in an 82–80 victory over Shadow Mountain High School, who had won 73 straight games against Arizona opponents. MaxPreps writer Jordan Divens said that Mannion's performance in the game "will go down in Arizona high school basketball lore." Five days later, Mannion recorded 33 points and 12 assists in a nationally televised game against top recruit Jalen Green and San Joaquin Memorial High School at the Hoophall West Invitational. On December 30, he scored 45 points in an 88–78 loss to Mater Dei High School at the Rancho Mirage Holiday Invitational National Division championship. Mannion, on February 2, 2019, tallied 57 points, including the game-winning shot as time expired, to help defeat Chaparral High School. On February 27, he led Pinnacle to a second Class 6A state title, posting 56 points, eight rebounds, and six assists in an 83–64 win over Chaparral High School. By the end of the season, Mannion was averaging 43.4 points, 6.2 rebounds, and 6.2 assists per game. He reclaimed the Arizona Gatorade Player of the Year award and was recognized as National High School Coaches Association (NHSCA) Senior Athlete of the Year. Mannion also earned USA Today All-USA second team and Naismith All-American third team honors. In the spring, he played in the McDonald's All-American Game and Nike Hoop Summit.

=== Recruiting ===
Mannion was considered a top 20 prospect in the 2020 recruiting class by 247Sports, Rivals and ESPN. But he reclassified to the 2019 class. Mannion received his first college basketball offer from Cal State Northridge while in eighth grade. In high school, he picked up offers from several major NCAA Division I programs, including Duke and Villanova. Mannion was a consensus five-star recruit and the best recruit from Arizona in the 2019 class. On September 14, 2018, he committed to Arizona over Marquette.

College recruiting
Name	Hometown	School	Height	Weight	Commit date
Nico Mannion; PG	Siena, Italy	Pinnacle (AZ)	6 ft 3 in (1.91 m)	180 lb (82 kg)	Sep 14, 2018
Nico Mannion; PG	Recruit ratings: Rivals: 247Sports: ESPN: (96)				
Overall recruit ranking: Rivals: 14 247Sports: 8 ESPN: 9
Note: In many cases, Scout, Rivals, 247Sports, On3, and ESPN may conflict in their listings of height and weight.; In these cases, the average was taken. ESPN grades are on a 100-point scale.; Sources: "Arizona 2019 Basketball Commitments". Rivals.; "2019 Arizona Wildcats Recruiting Class". ESPN.; "2019 Team Ranking". Rivals.

== College career ==
Mannion earned preseason first-team All-Pac-12 Conference honors and was named to the preseason watch lists for the Wooden Award and Naismith Trophy. In his second collegiate game for Arizona, on November 6, 2019, he recorded 23 points, nine assists and four rebounds in a 90–69 win over Illinois. On November 28, Mannion posted 16 points and 11 assists and made a game-winning layup with four seconds left in a 93–91 victory over Pepperdine in the first round of the Wooden Legacy. In a second-round win over Penn, he scored a season-high 24 points. Mannion led his team to the Wooden Legacy title and was named tournament most valuable player (MVP) after averaging 16.3 points and 7.3 assists per game. In the following day, he earned Pac-12 freshman of the week accolades. On February 29, 2020, Mannion had 19 points and six assists in a 69–64 loss to UCLA. At the conclusion of the regular season, Mannion was named to the All-Pac-12 second team and the All-Freshman Team. Mannion averaged 14.0 points and 5.3 assists per game as a freshman. Following the season, he declared for the 2020 NBA draft.

== Professional career ==
=== Golden State Warriors (2020–2021) ===
Mannion was selected with the 48th overall pick by the Golden State Warriors in the 2020 NBA draft hosted on November 18, 2020. Mannion made 30 appearances (including one start) for Golden State during the 2020–21 NBA season, recording averages of 4.1 points, 1.5 rebounds, and 2.3 assists. After one season with the Warriors and after playing with the Italian national basketball team at the 2020 Summer Olympics, he opted to leave the United States for Virtus Bologna.

=== Virtus Bologna (2021–2023) ===
On August 10, 2021, Mannion signed a two-year contract with Italian club Virtus Bologna of the Lega Basket Serie A, a team with the ambition of winning the EuroCup and qualify to the EuroLeague. The deal was closed in 24 hours after the end of the free agency. After having ousted Lietkabelis, Ulm and Valencia in the first three rounds of the playoffs, on May 11, 2022, Virtus defeated Frutti Extra Bursaspor by 80–67 at the Segafredo Arena, winning its first EuroCup and qualifying for the EuroLeague after 14 years. However, despite having ended the regular season at the first place and having ousted 3–0 both Pesaro and Tortona in the first two rounds of playoffs, Virtus was defeated 4–2 in the national finals by Olimpia Milano.

On September 29, 2022, after having ousted Milano in the semifinals, Virtus won its third Supercup, defeating 72–69 Banco di Sardegna Sassari and achieving a back-to-back, following the 2021 trophy. However, despite good premises Virtus ended the EuroLeague season at 14th place, thus it did not qualify for the playoffs. Moreover, the team was defeated in the Italian Basketball Cup final by Brescia. In June, after having ousted 3–0 both Brindisi and Tortona, Virtus was defeated 4–3 by Olimpia Milan in the national finals, following a series which was widely regarded among the best in the latest years of Italian basketball.

=== Baskonia (2023) ===
On June 26, 2023, Mannion signed a two-year contract with Spanish club Saski Baskonia of the Liga ACB and the Euroleague. In twelve league games, Mannion averaged 2.0 points, 0.7 rebounds and 2.0 assists per game, playing 10 minutes per contest. On December 21, Mannion and Baskonia reached an agreement to end the contract.

=== Varese (2023–2024) ===
On December 21, 2023, Mannion signed a one-and-a-half-year contract with Italian club Pallacanestro Varese of the Lega Basket Serie A.

=== Olimpia Milano (2024–2026) ===
On November 4, 2024, Mannion signed with Olimpia Milano on a 2+1 contract, with a buyout fee paid to Pallacanestro Varese. On June 25, 2026, Mannion and Milano parted ways.

=== Roma (2026–present) ===
On July 10, 2026, Mannion signed with BC Roma of the Italian Lega Basket Serie A (LBA).

== National team career ==
Mannion holds dual citizenship to the United States and Italy; his father is American from Salt Lake City, while his Italian mother is from Guidonia Montecelio. In 2017, he joined training camp with the United States national under-16 team and was a finalist for its 2017 FIBA Under-16 Americas Championship roster. After not making the team, he was contacted by the Italian Basketball Federation and joined the Italian national under-16 team at the 2017 FIBA Europe Under-16 Championship in Podgorica, Montenegro. Mannion made his debut on August 11, 2017, recording 15 points and seven assists in a 64–59 loss to France. Two days later, he posted 42 points, five rebounds, and six steals in 29 minutes in an 86–57 victory over Russia. Through seven games, Mannion averaged a tournament-high 19.9 points, 5.7 rebounds, 4.0 assists, and 3.0 steals per game, leading Italy to a ninth-place finish.

He debuted for the senior Italian national team at European qualifiers for the 2019 FIBA World Cup. In his sole appearance on July 1, 2018, Mannion scored nine points in 29 minutes in an 81–66 loss to the Netherlands, becoming the fourth-youngest player in team history at age 17.

=== International statistics ===
Year	Competition	GP	GS	MPG	FG%	3P%	FT%	RPG	APG	SPG	BPG	PPG
2017	FIBA U16 European Championship	7	7	27.6	.417	.350	.784	5.7	4.0	3.0	.0	19.9
2019	FIBA Basketball World Cup qualification	1	1	30.0	.300	.333	1.000	2.0	.0	1.0	.0	9.0

== Career statistics ==
Legend
GP	Games played	GS	Games started	MPG	Minutes per game
FG%	Field-goal percentage	3P%	3-point field-goal percentage	FT%	Free-throw percentage
RPG	Rebounds per game	APG	Assists per game	SPG	Steals per game
BPG	Blocks per game	PPG	Points per game	PIR	Performance index rating
**Bold**	Career high

=== NBA ===
Year	Team	GP	GS	MPG	FG%	3P%	FT%	RPG	APG	SPG	BPG	PPG
2020–21	Golden State	30	1	12.1	.342	.367	.821	1.5	2.3	.5	.0	4.1
Career		30	1	12.1	.342	.367	.821	1.5	2.3	.5	.0	4.1

=== EuroLeague ===
Year	Team	GP	GS	MPG	FG%	3P%	FT%	RPG	APG	SPG	BPG	PPG	PIR
2022–23	Bologna	**19**	**3**	13.4	.379	**.382**	**.864**	**1.4**	**2.6**	**.4**	—	5.9	**5.3**
2023–24	Baskonia	8	0	**13.8**	**.386**	.350	.700	1.3	2.3	.1	—	**6.0**	4.3
Career		27	3	13.5	.381	.373	.813	1.4	2.5	.3	—	5.9	5.0

=== College ===
Year	Team	GP	GS	MPG	FG%	3P%	FT%	RPG	APG	SPG	BPG	PPG
2019–20	Arizona	32	32	32.3	.392	.327	.797	2.5	5.3	1.2	.0	14.0

== Personal life ==
Mannion is the son of an American father and an Italian mother. His father, Pace Mannion, is a former National Basketball Association (NBA) player who played for six NBA teams through the 1980s. He played professionally for various teams in Italy until his retirement in 2002. Most notably, he helped Italian club Pallacanestro Cantù win the 1991 FIBA Korać Cup. Mannion's mother, Gaia Bianchi, is a former volleyball player who played for the Italian national volleyball team. In high school, one of Mannion's teammates was current New Orleans Saints quarterback Spencer Rattler. They helped lead Pinnacle High School to a state championship in 2017–18.
