= Alessandro Pajola =

Italian basketball player (born 1999)

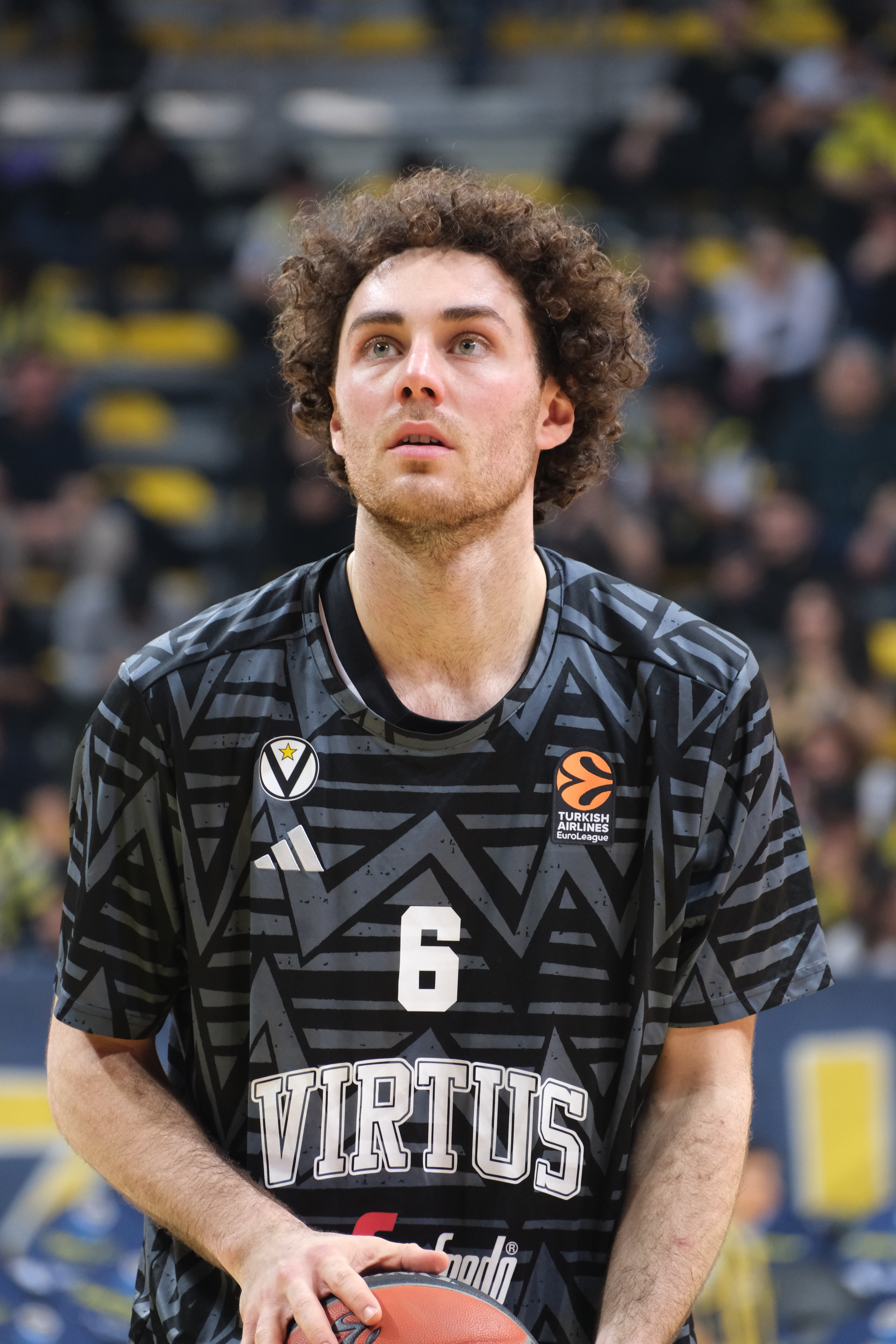
- Pajola with Virtus Bologna in 2025

No. 66 – Partizan Belgrade
- Position: Point guard / shooting guard
- League: Serbian SuperLeague; ABA League; EuroLeague

Personal information
- Born: 9 November 1999 (age 27) Ancona, Italy
- Listed height: 1.94 m (6 ft 4 in)
- Listed weight: 95 kg (209 lb)

Career information
- NBA draft: 2021: undrafted
- Playing career: 2016–present

Career history
- 2016–2026: Virtus Bologna
- 2026–present: Partizan

Career highlights
- EuroCup champion (2022); FIBA Champions League champion (2019); 2× Lega Serie A champion (2021, 2025); 2× Lega Serie A Defensive Player of the Year (2022, 2025); Lega Serie A Best Young Player (2021); 3× Italian Supercup winner (2021–2023); Italian Supercup MVP (2021)
Medals
Men's basketball
Representing Italy
FIBA Under-19 World Cup
Silver medal – second place	2017 Egypt	U-19 National Team
FIBA Europe Under-18 Championship
Bronze medal – third place	2016 Turkey	U-18 National Team

Alessandro Pajola (born 9 November 1999) is an Italian professional basketball player for Partizan Belgrade of the Serbian SuperLeague, the ABA League, and the EuroLeague. He is also a member of the senior Italian national team. Standing at 1.94 m (6 ft 4 1/2 in), he can play at both the point guard and shooting guard positions. Pajola is widely known for his elite defensive ability.

== Professional career ==
=== Virtus Bologna (2015–2026) ===
Pajola joined Virtus Bologna in 2015, becoming an important supporting cast player in 2016–17, when the club was in Serie A2. On 19 June 2017, the Black V won the playoffs, beating Trieste by 3–0, thus returning to the top series after only one year.

Pajola's importance in the team grown up season after season, becoming one of Virtus' most prominent player in 2020–21 season. In June 2021, after having knocked out 3–0 both Basket Treviso in the quarterfinals and New Basket Brindisi in the semifinals, on Virtus defeated 4–0 its historic rival Olimpia Milano in the national finals, winning its 16th national title and the first one after twenty years.

On 21 September 2021, the team won its second Supercup, defeating once again Olimpia Milano 90–84. After an outstanding game in the final, Pajola was named MVP of the tournament. Moreover, after having ousted Lietkabelis, Ulm and Valencia in the first three rounds of the playoffs, on 11 May 2022, Virtus defeated Frutti Extra Bursaspor by 80–67 at the Segafredo Arena, winning its first EuroCup and qualifying for the EuroLeague after 14 years. However, despite having ended the regular season at the first place and having ousted 3–0 both Pesaro and Tortona in the first two rounds of playoffs, Virtus was defeated 4–2 in the national finals by Olimpia Milan.

On 29 September 2022, after having ousted Milano in the semifinals, Virtus won its third Supercup, defeating 72–69 Banco di Sardegna Sassari and achieving a back-to-back, following the 2021 trophy. However, despite good premises Virtus ended the EuroLeague season at the 14th place, thus it did not qualify for the playoffs. Moreover, the team was defeated in the Italian Basketball Cup final by Brescia. In June, after having ousted 3–0 both Brindisi and Tortona, Virtus was defeated 4–3 by Olimpia Milan in the national finals, following a series which was widely regarded among the best in the latest years of Italian basketball. At the end of the regular season, on 10 May 2023, Pajola renewed his contract with Virtus through 2026.

On 24 September 2023, after having ousted Olimpia Milano in the semifinals, Virtus won its fourth Supercup, and the third in a row, defeating 97–60 Germani Brescia. Despite an impressive first half of the season, Virtus ended the EuroLeague regular season at the 10th place, qualifying only for the play-in, where after having defeated 67–64 Anadolu Efes, it lost against Baskonia 89–77, not qualifying for the playoffs. Moreover, the Black V placed first during the Italian regular season but, after having knocked out Tortona by 3–2 and Reyer Venezia by 3–1, it lost the third consecutive final against Milan by 3–1.

In the following season Virtus ended the EuroLeague at the 17th place, after a disappointing regular season. After arriving first in the national championship season, Virtus eliminated Venezia 3–2 and their arch-rival Milan 3–1, reaching their fifth finals in a row. They then defeated Brescia 3–0, claiming the Italian championship title for the 17th time. For Pajola, this was the second scudetto of his career.

In the 2025–26 season, Pajola became the team captain. In May 2026, his final season with Virtus was cut short after he underwent knee surgery.

=== Partizan Belgrade (2026–present) ===
On July 23, 2026, Pajola signed a two–year deal with Partizan Belgrade of the Serbian SuperLeague, the ABA League, and the EuroLeague.

== Career statistics ==
Legend
GP	Games played	GS	Games started	MPG	Minutes per game
FG%	Field-goal percentage	3P%	3-point field-goal percentage	FT%	Free-throw percentage
RPG	Rebounds per game	APG	Assists per game	SPG	Steals per game
BPG	Blocks per game	PPG	Points per game	PIR	Performance index rating
**Bold**	Career high

=== EuroLeague ===
Year	Team	GP	GS	MPG	FG%	3P%	FT%	RPG	APG	SPG	BPG	PPG	PIR
2022–23	Virtus Bologna	29	0	16.7	**.418**	.324	**.733**	**1.8**	2.5	**1.2**	—	3.1	**4.9**
2023–24	Virtus Bologna	**34**	**8**	**17.0**	.387	**.352**	.727	**1.8**	**3.0**	.8	**.1**	**3.9**	**4.9**
Career		63	8	16.9	.400	.343	.729	1.8	2.8	1.0	.1	3.5	4.9

=== Italian Championship ===
Year	Team	GP	GS	MPG	FG%	3P%	FT%	RPG	APG	SPG	BPG	PPG	PIR
2015–16	Virtus Bologna	2	0	1.0	.000	.000	.000	.0	.0	.0	.0	.0	.0
2016–17	Virtus Bologna	24	0	9.9	.413	**.364**	.500	1.2	.6	.5	.0	2.3	1.5
2017–18	Virtus Bologna	17	**2**	11.9	.450	.250	.600	1.1	.8	.6	.0	1.6	1.9
2018–19	Virtus Bologna	**27**	0	11.7	.282	.286	.571	1.1	1.0	.7	**.1**	1.3	.7
2019–20	Virtus Bologna	20	1	**12.2**	**.465**	.313	**.722**	**1.6**	**1.5**	**.8**	**.1**	**3.1**	**4.6**
