= Jordan Mickey =

American basketball player (born 1994)

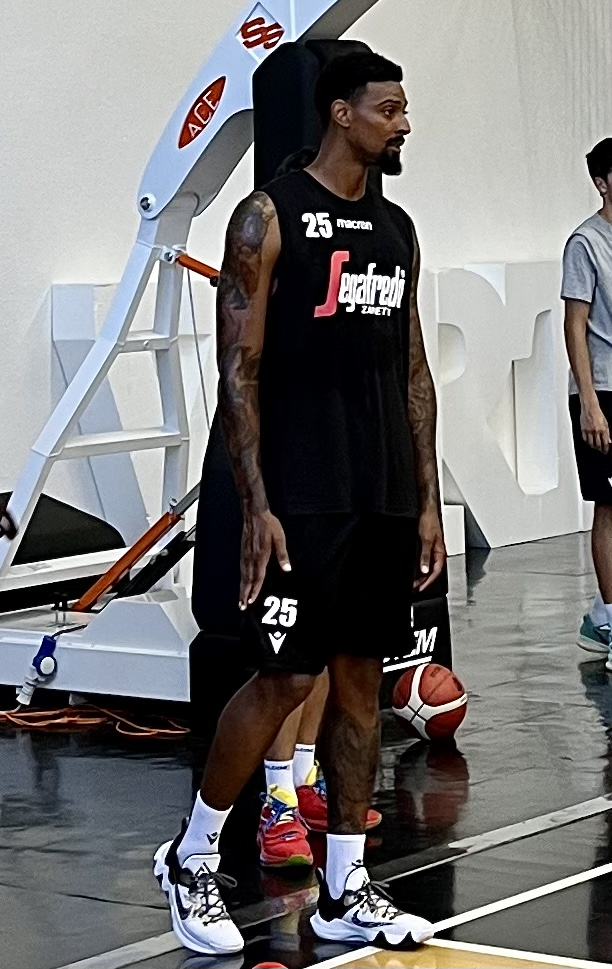
- Mickey in 2022

No. 55 – Qingdao Eagles
- Position: Power forward / center
- League: CBA

Personal information
- Born: July 9, 1994 (age 32) Dallas, Texas, U.S.
- Listed height: 6 ft 8 in (2.03 m)
- Listed weight: 236 lb (107 kg)

Career information
- High school: Grace Prep (Arlington, Texas); Prime Prep (Dallas, Texas)
- College: LSU (2013–2015)
- NBA draft: 2015: 2nd round, 33rd overall pick
- Drafted by: Boston Celtics
- Playing career: 2015–present

Career history
- 2015–2017: Boston Celtics
- 2015–2017: →Maine Red Claws
- 2017–2018: Miami Heat
- 2018–2019: Khimki Moscow
- 2019–2020: Real Madrid
- 2020–2021: Khimki Moscow
- 2021–2022: Zenit Saint Petersburg
- 2022–2024: Virtus Bologna
- 2024–present: Qingdao Eagles

Career highlights
- CBA rebounding leader (2026); 2x Italian Supercup winner (2022, 2023); VTB United League champion (2022); VTB United League Supercup winner (2022); VTB United League Playoffs MVP (2022); VTB United League Defensive Player of the Year (2022); 3× VTB United League All-Star (2019, 2021, 2022); 3× All-VTB United League First Team (2019, 2021, 2022); VTB United League Hall of Fame (2023); Spanish Super Cup champion (2019); Spanish Cup champion (2020); NBA D-League All-Star (2016); NCAA blocks leader (2015); First-team All-SEC (2015); Second-team All SEC (2014); 2× SEC All-Defensive Team (2014, 2015); SEC All-Freshman Team (2014)
- Stats at NBA.com
- Stats at Basketball Reference

Jordan Grayson Mickey (born July 9, 1994) is an American professional basketball player for Qingdao Eagles of the Chinese Basketball Association (CBA). He played college basketball for the LSU Tigers before being selected by the Boston Celtics with the 33rd overall pick in the 2015 NBA draft.

== High school career ==
Mickey attended Arlington Grace Prep for three years, guiding the program to a state championship during his junior season, before transferring to Prime Prep Academy in 2012. During his lone campaign with Prime Prep in 2012–13, he averaged 16 points, 10 rebounds and two blocks per game. Considered a four-star recruit by ESPN.com, Mickey was listed as the No. 12 power forward and the No. 38 player in the nation in 2013.

== College career ==
Mickey was an immediate contributor when he began his freshman season at LSU in 2013–14, compiling double-doubles during each of his first three contests. He started all 34 of the Tigers' games and averaged 12.7 points and 7.9 rebounds per game. He also became just the second Tiger in program history to block at least 100 shots in a season, joining Shaquille O'Neal. He earned multiple awards in 2013–14, including Coaches All-SEC Second Team, All-SEC Freshman Team, All-SEC Defensive Team, LSWA Louisiana Freshman of the Year, and LSWA All-Louisiana Second Team.

As a sophomore in 2014–15, Mickey led the nation in blocked shots per game (3.6), along with 15.4 points and 9.9 rebounds. He blocked at least six shots in four straight contests from December 18 through January 3. He did, however, suffer with lingering shoulder and ankle injuries throughout his sophomore year, but played through the pain. In the second round of the NCAA Tournament, he tallied 12 points, 14 rebounds and six blocks, but the Tigers were edged by North Carolina State, 66–65. He again earned multiple awards in 2014–15, including Coaches All-SEC First Team, AP All-SEC First Team, All-SEC Defensive Team, All-District NABC Team, and All-District USBWA Team.

On March 31, 2015, Mickey declared for the NBA draft, forgoing his final two years of college eligibility.

== Professional career ==
=== Boston Celtics (2015–2017) ===
==== 2015–16 season ====
On June 25, 2015, Mickey was selected with the 33rd overall pick in the 2015 NBA draft by the Boston Celtics. On July 20, he signed with the Celtics after playing for the team at the Utah and Las Vegas summer leagues. Over the first two and a half months of the 2015–16 season, Mickey spent the majority of his time in the NBA Development League playing for the Maine Red Claws, Boston's affiliate team in the D-League. Between October 28 and January 18, he played three games for the Celtics and 21 games for the Red Claws.

On January 5, 2016, Mickey was named the NBA Development League Player of the Month for December 2015, becoming the first player in Red Claws franchise history to receive Player of the Month honors. Mickey led Maine to a 7–2 record (6–2 in games that he played) and averaged 19.6 points, 10.5 rebounds, 5.3 blocks and 1.8 assists per game. On December 6, he scored a season-high 32 points and grabbed 13 rebounds in a 110–97 win over the Erie BayHawks, and on December 31, he recorded a triple-double with 13 points, 13 rebounds and an NBA D-League season-high 10 blocks in a 119–112 win over the Texas Legends. On January 18, he was recalled by the Celtics after he sprained his ankle two days prior while playing for the Red Claws. On January 29, he was named in the East All-Star team for the 2016 NBA D-League All-Star Game, becoming the 13th player in Red Claws' history to land an All-Star honor. However, he was ruled out of the All-Star game due to his left ankle injury and was replaced in the East team by Keith Benson. Mickey went on to play in seven of the Celtics' 10 games post All-Star break, receiving limited minutes. During this stretch, he recorded a season-best three blocked shots in under two minutes of action against the Memphis Grizzlies on March 9. The following day, he returned to the Red Claws for the first time since January 18 for a one-game stint. He received three more assignments to Maine on March 13, April 5 and April 7. In 25 games (23 regular season, two playoff) for Maine in 2015–16, he averaged 17.8 points, 10.2 rebounds, 1.2 assists and 3.9 blocks per game.

==== 2016–17 season ====
Mickey appeared in eight of the Celtics' first 19 games of the 2016–17 season. During that stretch, he scored a season-high eight points on 4-of-4 shooting in 19 minutes against the Denver Nuggets on November 6. On January 11 against Washington, Mickey made his first career start as a replacement for the injured Amir Johnson. In 14 minutes, he recorded four points, two rebounds, one assist and one block in a 117–108 win over the Wizards. During the 2016–17 season, he received multiple assignments to the Maine Red Claws, the Celtics' D-League affiliate.

On July 13, 2017, Mickey was waived by the Celtics.

=== Miami Heat (2017–2018) ===
On August 20, 2017, Mickey signed with the Miami Heat. On December 16, 2017, he scored a career-high nine points off the bench in a 90–85 win over the Los Angeles Clippers. In May 2018, the Heat declined their $1.6 million option on Mickey's contract, making him a free agent.

=== Khimki (2018–2019) ===
On July 26, 2018, Mickey signed a one-year deal with the Russian team BC Khimki of the VTB United League and the EuroLeague.

=== Real Madrid (2019–2020) ===
On July 15, 2019, Mickey signed a two-year deal with Spanish powerhouse Real Madrid.

=== Return to Khimki (2020–2021) ===
On July 21, 2020, Mickey made his official return to Khimki Moscow on a one-year contract.

=== Zenit St. Petersburg (2021–2022) ===
On July 4, 2021, Mickey signed with Zenit Saint Petersburg.

He left the team after the 2022 Russian invasion of Ukraine.

=== Virtus Bologna (2022–2024) ===
On July 13, 2022, Mickey signed with Virtus Bologna of the Italian Lega Basket Serie A and the EuroLeague. On 29 September 2022, after having ousted Olimpia Milano in the semifinals, Virtus won its third Supercup, defeating 72–69 Banco di Sardegna Sassari and achieving a back-to-back, following the 2021 trophy. However, despite good premises Virtus ended the EuroLeague season at the 14th place, thus it did not qualify for the playoffs. Moreover, the team was defeated in the Italian Basketball Cup final by Brescia. In June, after having ousted 3–0 both Brindisi and Tortona, Virtus was defeated 4–3 by Olimpia Milan in the national finals, following a series which was widely regarded among the best in the latest years of Italian basketball.

On 24 September 2023, after having ousted Olimpia Milano in the semifinals, Virtus won its fourth Supercup, and the third in a row, defeating 97–60 Germani Brescia.

=== Qingdao Eagles (2024–present) ===
On November 6, 2024, Mickey signed with Qingdao Eagles of the Chinese Basketball Association (CBA), replaced Akil Mitchell.

== Career statistics ==
Legend
GP	Games played	GS	Games started	MPG	Minutes per game
FG%	Field-goal percentage	3P%	3-point field-goal percentage	FT%	Free-throw percentage
RPG	Rebounds per game	APG	Assists per game	SPG	Steals per game
BPG	Blocks per game	PPG	Points per game	PIR	Performance index rating
**Bold**	Career high

=== NBA ===
==== Regular season ====
Year	Team	GP	GS	MPG	FG%	3P%	FT%	RPG	APG	SPG	BPG	PPG
2015–16	Boston	16	0	3.6	.364	–	.500	.8	.1	.0	**.7**	1.3
2016–17	Boston	**25**	1	5.6	.441	.000	.571	1.4	.3	.1	.2	1.5
2017–18	Miami	23	**3**	**12.3**	**.476**	**.125**	**.684**	**3.6**	**.4**	**.3**	.4	**4.0**
Career		64	4	7.5	.449	.118	.605	2.0	.3	.1	.4	2.4

==== Playoffs ====
Year	Team	GP	GS	MPG	FG%	3P%	FT%	RPG	APG	SPG	BPG	PPG
2016	Boston	**2**	0	5.0	**.500**	.000	.000	1.0	**1.0**	.0	**.5**	**2.0**
2017	Boston	**2**	0	**8.8**	.400	.000	.000	**2.5**	.0	.0	**.5**	**2.0**
Career		4	0	7.0	.444	.000	.000	1.8	.5	.0	.5	2.0

=== EuroLeague ===
Year	Team	GP	GS	MPG	FG%	3P%	FT%	RPG	APG	SPG	BPG	PPG	PIR
2018–19	Khimki	28	5	22.5	.529	.351	.739	5.0	.7	.8	1.1	14.2	**15.4**
2019–20	Real Madrid	26	2	16.6	**.628**	.333	.780	4.2	.6	.4	1.0	9.0	10.8
2020–21	Khimki	28	12	**28.9**	.516	.239	.777	**5.8**	**.9**	**1.1**	**1.5**	**15.6**	10.1
2021–22	Zenit	22	**22**	25.4	.509	.357	**.800**	4.3	.8	.5	.9	10.5	10.1
2022–23	Bologna	**32**	18	22.0	.429	.254	.792	4.1	.8	.7	.7	7.3	8.2
2023–24	Bologna	26	4	18.2	.483	**.415**	.675	4.0	.6	.4	.7	8.2	7.7
Career		162	63	22.3	.512	.313	.761	4.5	.7	.7	1.0	10.8	11.5

== Personal life ==
Mickey is the son of James Wright and Torand Hunter. His father played center for Abilene Christian University and was the Lone Star Conference MVP in 1984–85.

== See also ==
- List of NCAA Division I men's basketball season blocks leaders
