= Isaïa Cordinier =

French basketball player (born 1996)

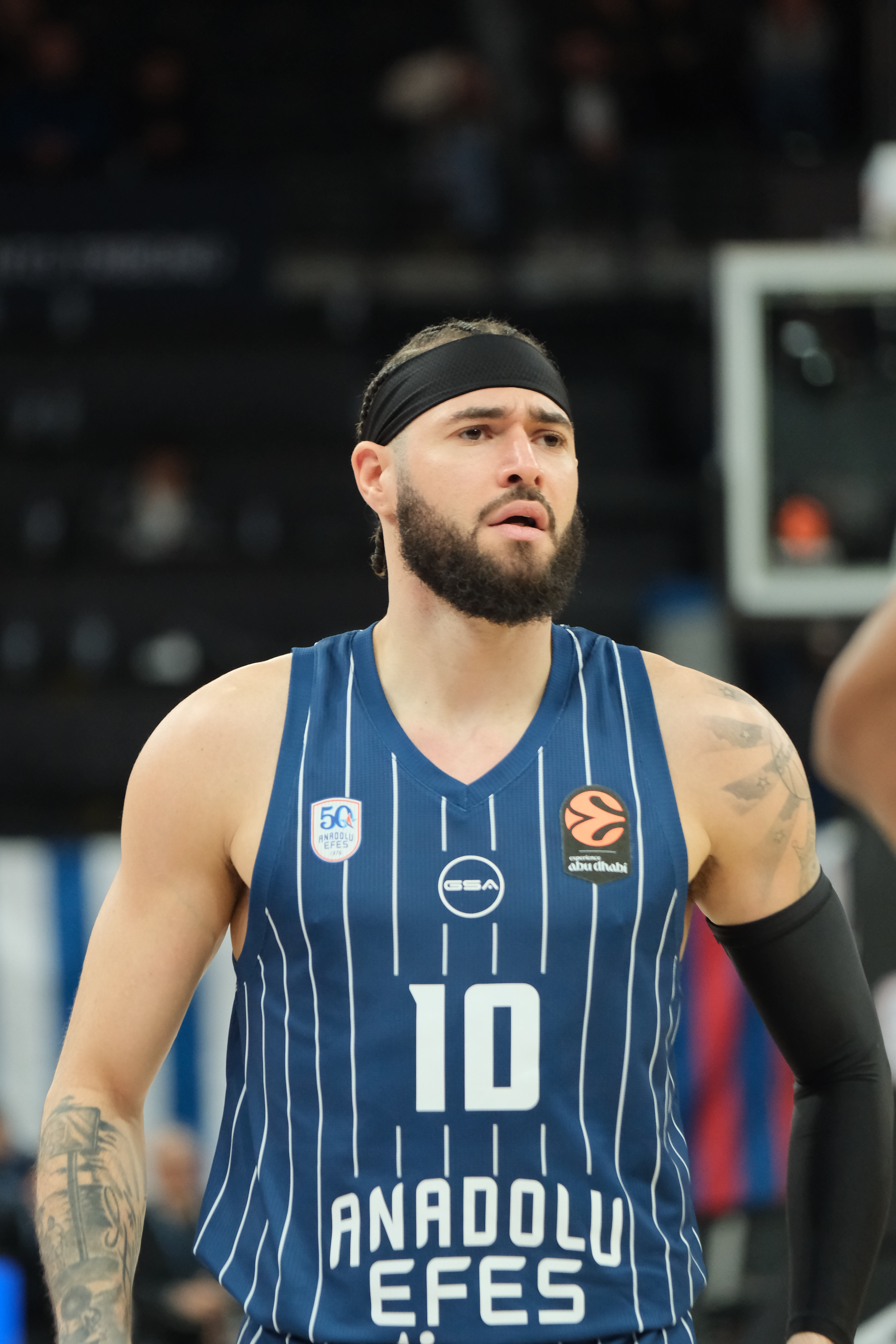
- Cordinier with Anadolu Efes in 2026

No. 10 – Anadolu Efes
- Position: Shooting guard
- League: BSL; EuroLeague

Personal information
- Born: 28 November 1996 (age 29) Créteil, France
- Listed height: 1.98 m (6 ft 6 in)
- Listed weight: 89 kg (196 lb)

Career information
- NBA draft: 2016: 2nd round, 44th overall pick
- Drafted by: Atlanta Hawks
- Playing career: 2012–present

Career history
- 2012–2014: Antibes Sharks
- 2014–2015: ALM Évreux
- 2015–2016: Denain-Voltaire
- 2016–2019: Antibes Sharks
- 2019–2021: Nanterre 92
- 2021–2025: Virtus Bologna
- 2025–present: Anadolu Efes

Career highlights
- EuroCup champion (2022); All-EuroCup First Team (2021); Lega Serie A champion (2025); 2× Italian Supercup winner (2022, 2023); LNB Pro B champion (2013); LNB Pro B Most Improved Player (2016)
- Stats at Basketball Reference

Isaïa Cordinier (born 28 November 1996) is a French professional basketball player for Anadolu Efes of the Basketbol Süper Ligi (BSL) and the EuroLeague. He was selected by the Atlanta Hawks with the 44th overall pick in the 2016 NBA draft. Standing at 1.98 m (6 ft 6 in), he plays at the shooting guard position.

== Early life and career ==
Cordinier started playing basketball at age seven, in Vence. His father is from the French overseas department of Martinique and Cordinier lived in Martinique from 2006 to 2009. He later joined the youth academy of Sharks d’Antibes.

== Professional career ==
=== Antibes Sharks (2012–2014) ===
Cordinier made his debut on Antibes’ senior men's team, in the French second division, in November 2012, when he was 15 years and 11 months old. During the 2013-14 campaign, he made his debut in the French top-tier level Pro A.

=== ALM Évreux (2014–2015) ===
For the 2014–2015 season, Cordinier transferred to second-division side ALM Évreux Basket. In 23 games, he averaged 4.9 points and 2.1 rebounds for Évreux.

=== Denain-Voltaire (2015–2016) ===
Prior to the 2015–16 season, Cordinier penned a deal with another second-division team, Denain ASC Voltaire. In April 2016, Cordinier was selected to play in the Nike Hoop Summit, where he tallied eight points, five rebounds and one assist, in 21 minutes off the bench. Later that month, he declared for the NBA draft. On June 13, 2016, Cordinier was one of 13 different international underclassmen (including one of four different Frenchmen) to enter the 2016 NBA draft.

=== Return to Antibes Sharks (2016–2019) ===
Cordinier joined Olympique Antibes of the French top-flight LNB Pro A for the 2016–17 season. He made 30 Pro A appearances for Antibes in 2016–17, averaging 6.5 points and 2.8 rebounds a contest.

=== Nanterre 92 (2019–2021) ===
On 5 June 2019, Cordinier signed a two-year deal with Nanterre 92 of the LNB Pro A. During the 2020–21 season, he averaged 12 points, 4.9 rebounds, 3.7 assists and 1.5 steals in LNB Pro A, along with 15.8 points, 5.2 rebounds, 3.2 assists and 1.7 steals in the EuroCup, and was named to the All-EuroCup First Team for the 2020–21 season.

=== Virtus Bologna (2021–2025) ===
On 5 October 2021, Cordinier signed a two-year contract with Virtus Bologna of the Lega Basket Serie A. After having ousted Lietkabelis, Ulm and Valencia in the first three rounds of the playoffs, on 11 May 2022, Virtus defeated Frutti Extra Bursaspor by 80–67 at the Segafredo Arena, winning its first EuroCup and qualifying for the EuroLeague after 14 years. However, despite having ended the regular season at the first place and having ousted 3–0 both Pesaro and Tortona in the first two rounds of playoffs, Virtus was defeated 4–2 in the national finals by Olimpia Milano.

On 29 September 2022, after having ousted Milano in the semifinals, Virtus won its third Supercup, defeating 72–69 Banco di Sardegna Sassari and achieving a back-to-back, following the 2021 trophy. However, despite good premises, Virtus ended the EuroLeague season at the 14th place, thus it did not qualify for the playoffs. Moreover, the team was defeated in the Italian Basketball Cup final by Brescia. In June, after having ousted 3–0 both Brindisi and Tortona, Virtus was defeated 4–3 by Olimpia Milan in the national finals, following a series which was widely regarded among the best in the latest years of Italian basketball.

On 24 September 2023, after having ousted Olimpia Milano in the semifinals, Virtus won its fourth Supercup, and the third in a row, defeating 97–60 Germani Brescia. Despite an impressive first half of the season, Virtus ended the EuroLeague regular season at the 10th place, qualifying only for the play-in, where after having defeated 67–64 Anadolu Efes, it lost against Baskonia 89–77, not qualifying for the playoffs. Moreover, the Black V placed first during the Italian regular season but, after having knocked out Tortona by 3–2 and Reyer Venezia by 3–1, it lost the third consecutive final against Milan by 3–1.

In the following season, Virtus ended the EuroLeague in 17th place, after a disappointing regular season. After arriving first in the national championship season, Virtus eliminated Venezia 3–2 and their arch-rival Milan 3–1, reaching their fifth finals in a row. They then defeated Brescia 3–0, claiming the Italian championship title for the 17th time.

=== Anadolu Efes (2025–present) ===
On 19 July 2025, Cordinier signed a two-year deal with Anadolu Efes of the Basketbol Süper Ligi (BSL).

=== NBA draft rights ===
Cordinier was drafted by the Atlanta Hawks, in the 2016 NBA draft (2nd round, 44th overall, fourth of five Frenchmen taken), and played for the Hawks in the 2016 NBA Summer League.

On 13 July 2018, Cordinier's draft rights were traded to the Brooklyn Nets, along with a future 2nd-round pick, for Jeremy Lin and picks.

In September 2021, the Nets renounced Cordinier's draft rights, making him an unrestricted free agent.

== National team career ==
Cordinier was named to the French Under-18 junior national team that competed at the 2014 FIBA Europe Under-18 Championship in Turkey. He saw the court in nine games during the tournament, tallying 9.7 points, 5.6 boards, 2.6 assists and 1.0 steals per contest.

Cordinier then joined France at the 2023 World Cup, as well as at the 2024 Olympics.

== Career statistics ==
Legend
GP	Games played	GS	Games started	MPG	Minutes per game
FG%	Field-goal percentage	3P%	3-point field-goal percentage	FT%	Free-throw percentage
RPG	Rebounds per game	APG	Assists per game	SPG	Steals per game
BPG	Blocks per game	PPG	Points per game	PIR	Performance index rating
**Bold**	Career high

=== EuroLeague ===
Year	Team	GP	GS	MPG	FG%	3P%	FT%	RPG	APG	SPG	BPG	PPG	PIR
2022–23	Bologna	19	6	18.0	.427	.239	.738	2.5	1.5	.8	.1	6.6	6.3
2023–24	Bologna	31	27	22.3	**.483**	**.338**	.780	3.8	2.6	**.9**	**.5**	8.6	10.4
2024–25	Bologna	**34**	**31**	**26.5**	.474	.277	**.798**	**3.9**	**3.9**	.8	.1	**12.0**	**13.6**
Career		84	64	23.2	.465	.299	.795	3.3	2.2	.9	.3	9.5	10.7

== Personal life ==
His father Stéphane is a former professional handball player, who represented France in the 1996 Olympic Games in Atlanta and won bronze at the 1997 World Handball Championship. Isaia also played handball before turning to basketball.
