= 2022 EuroCup Final =

Final of the 2021–22 edition of the EuroCup Basketball

2022 EuroCup final
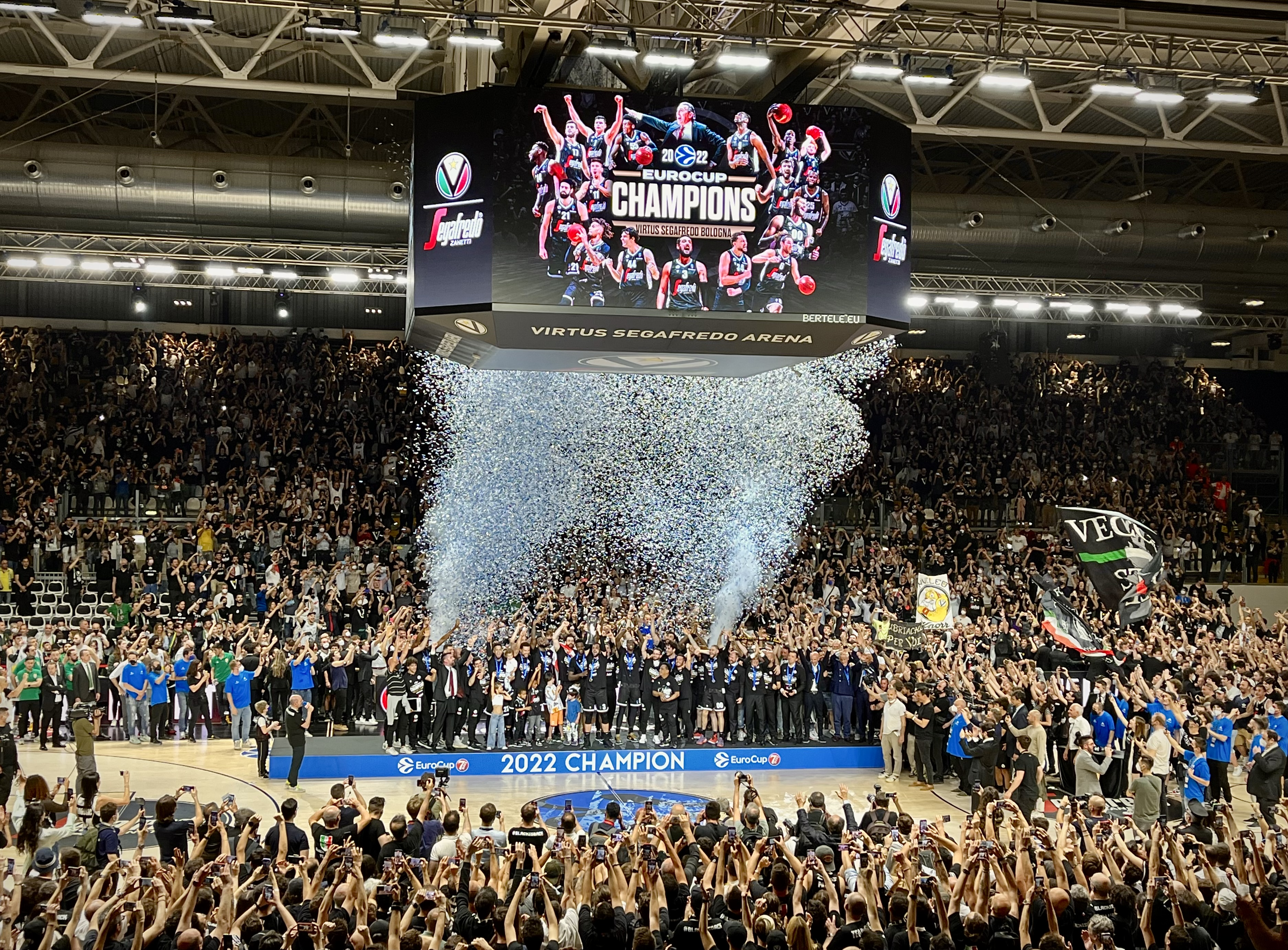
- Virtus Segafredo Bologna celebrating the title.
- Event: 2021–22 EuroCup Basketball
Virtus Segafredo Bologna	Frutti Extra Bursaspor
(Italian Basketball Federation)	(Turkish Basketball Federation)
80	67
	1	2	3	4	Total
Virtus Segafredo Bologna	25	16	21	18	80
Frutti Extra Bursaspor	12	19	22	14	67
- Date: 11 May 2022
- Venue: Virtus Segafredo Arena, Bologna
- MVP: (Serbia) Miloš Teodosić
- Attendance: 10,000

The 2022 EuroCup final was the final match of the 2021–22 EuroCup Basketball, the 20th season of Euroleague Basketball's secondary level professional club basketball tournament, and the 14th season since it was renamed from the ULEB Cup to the EuroCup. It was played at the Virtus Segafredo Arena in Bologna, Italy, on 11 May 2022, between Italian club Virtus Segafredo Bologna and Turkish club Frutti Extra Bursaspor.

Virtus Segafredo Bologna defeated Frutti Extra Bursaspor 80–67 to conquer their 1st EuroCup title and earned the right to play in the 2022–23 EuroLeague. Virtus Segafredo Bologna also became the first Italian team to win the EuroCup.

== Background ==
It was the first ever EuroCup final appearance ever of Virtus Segafredo Bologna and Frutti Extra Bursaspor, after Virtus Segafredo Bologna never reached a stage further than the semifinals in history and Frutti Extra Bursaspor never reached a stage further than the regular season in history. Virtus Segafredo Bologna also became the first Italian team to reach an EuroCup final.

Virtus Segafredo Bologna played in their 11th European final. They previously won the Saporta Cup title in 1990, lifted the EuroLeague trophy twice in 1998 and 2001, claimed the EuroChallenge crown in 2009 and the Champions League in 2019. Virtus Segafredo Bologna also played three EuroLeague finals (1981, 1999 and 2002), and two Saporta Cup championship games (1978 and 2000).

== Venue ==
The arena was inaugurated on 10 November 2019, for the home game against Treviso Basket, won by Virtus 84–79. On 25 December, for the derby against Fortitudo Bologna, 9,166 fans attended the game, achieving a new record for Virtus in LBA. In January 2020, the arena was dismantled and rebuilt in September, to host the Final Four of the 2020 Italian Basketball Supercup. Moreover, the arena became the official home court of Virtus for the 2020–21 season of LBA and EuroCup.

In April 2021, Massimo Zanetti, owner of Virtus and Segafredo, announced that the team will remain to the Segafredo Arena for at least three more seasons, with the hope of starting to build a new arena in 2022. On 11 June 2021, at the Segafredo Arena, Virtus defeated its historic rival Olimpia Milano in the national finals, winning its 16th national title and the first one after twenty years. In November 2021, the arena was moved to another fair pavilion with a capacity of 10,000 seats and was inaugurated on 17 November for a EuroCup match against Reyer Venezia.

Bologna	2022 EuroCup Final (Europe)
Virtus Segafredo Arena	2022 EuroCup Final (Europe)
Capacity: 10,000	2022 EuroCup Final (Europe)

== Road to the Final ==
Note: In the table, the score of the finalist is given first (H = home; A = away).

(Italian Basketball Federation) Virtus Segafredo Bologna		Round	(Turkish Basketball Federation) Frutti Extra Bursaspor	
4th place (11–7) (Group B)		Regular season	7th place (8–10) (Group B)	
Opponent	Score	Playoffs	Opponent	Score
(Lithuanian Basketball Federation) Lietkabelis	75–67 (H)	Eighthfinals	(Basketball Federation of Serbia) Partizan NIS	103–95 (A)
(German Basketball Federation) ratiopharm Ulm	83–77 (H)	Quarterfinals	(Basketball Federation of Slovenia) Cedevita Olimpija	85–83 (A)
(Spanish Basketball Federation) Valencia Basket	83–73 (A)	Semifinals	(Spanish Basketball Federation) MoraBanc Andorra	85–68 (A)

== Match details ==
11 May 2022	Virtus Segafredo Bologna (Italian Basketball Federation)	80–67	(Turkish Basketball Federation) Frutti Extra Bursaspor	Bologna
20:30	Scoring by quarter: 25–12, 16–19, 21–22, 18–14
	Pts: Teodosić 21; Rebs: Jaiteh 10; Asts: Pajola 6 PIR: Weems 16	Boxscore	Pts: Dudzinski 14; Rebs: Dudzinski 7 Asts: Andrews, Bitim 3 PIR: Hayes 20	Arena: Virtus Segafredo Arena; Attendance: 10,000; Referees: Saša Pukl, Anne Panther, Emilio Pérez

Starters:			Pts	Reb	Ast
PG	23	(Italy) Daniel Hackett	1	5	2
SG	44	(Serbia) Miloš Teodosić	21	1	3
SF	34	(United States) Kyle Weems	13	4	2
PF	21	(Georgia (country)) Tornike Shengelia	5	7	2
C	14	(France) Mouhammadou Jaiteh	13	10	1
Reserves:					
C	0	(Italy) Amedeo Tessitori	0	1	0
SG	00	(France) Isaïa Cordinier	0	2	0
PG	1	(Italy) Nico Mannion	0	0	0
SG	3	(Italy) Marco Belinelli	12	2	3
G	6	(Italy) Alessandro Pajola	0	1	6
PF	8	(United States) Kevin Hervey	4	3	2
PF	25	(United States) JaKarr Sampson	11	5	1
Head coach:
(Italian Basketball Federation) Sergio Scariolo

Virtus	Bursaspor

Virtus	Statistics	Bursaspor
21/39 (53.8%)	2-pt field goals	15/27 (55.6%)
9/28 (32.1%)	3-pt field goals	6/26 (23.1%)
11/16 (68.8%)	Free throws	19/24 (79.2%)
17	Offensive rebounds	8
27	Defensive rebounds	22
44	Total rebounds	30
22	Assists	11
10	Turnovers	14
8	Steals	2
5	Blocks	2
23	Fouls	20

2021–22 EuroCup champions

Virtus Segafredo Bologna
(1st title)

Starters:			Pts	Reb	Ast
PG	5	(Montenegro) Derek Needham	11	2	0
SG	12	(United States) Andrew Andrews	6	4	3
SF	10	(Turkey) Onuralp Bitim	12	5	3
PF	23	(United States) Dave Dudzinski	14	7	0
C	13	(Central African Republic) Kevarrius Hayes	6	4	3
Reserves:					
G/F	0	(Puerto Rico) John Holland	3	1	0
F/C	1	(Turkey) Tarık Sezgün	DNP		
PG	4	(Turkey) Mithat Can Özalp	DNP		
PF	7	(Turkey) Metin Türen	0	2	2
G/F	8	(Turkey) Birkan Batuk	DNP		
PG	9	(Turkey) Ömer Utku Al	3	0	0
F/C	22	(Turkey) Ayberk Olmaz	DNP		
Head coach:
(Basketball Federation of Serbia) Dušan Alimpijević

== See also ==
- 2022 EuroLeague Final Four
- 2022 Basketball Champions League Final Four
- 2022 FIBA Europe Cup Finals
