= 2022 EuroCup Basketball Playoffs =

Europe secondary club basketball tournament

The 2022 EuroCup Basketball Playoffs began on 19 April with the eighthfinals and ended on 11 May 2022 with the final at the Virtus Segafredo Arena in Bologna, Italy, to decide the champions of the 2021–22 EuroCup Basketball. A total of 16 teams competed in the playoffs.

Times are CEST, as listed by Euroleague Basketball (local times, if different, are in parentheses).

== Format ==
In the playoffs, teams played against each other in a single-game format. The higher ranked regular season team in each matchup enjoyed home court advantage.

== Qualified teams ==
Pos	Group A	Group B	Seeding
1	(Spain) Joventut	(Spain) Gran Canaria	Seeded in eighthfinals
2	(Serbia) Partizan NIS	(Spain) Valencia Basket	Seeded in eighthfinals
3	(France) Metropolitans 92	(Slovenia) Cedevita Olimpija	Seeded in eighthfinals
4	(Spain) MoraBanc Andorra	(Italy) Virtus Segafredo Bologna	Seeded in eighthfinals
5	(Lithuania) Lietkabelis	(Montenegro) Budućnost VOLI	Unseeded in eighthfinals
6	(Turkey) Türk Telekom	(Italy) Umana Reyer Venezia	Unseeded in eighthfinals
7	(Germany) Hamburg Towers	(Turkey) Frutti Extra Bursaspor	Unseeded in eighthfinals
8	(Poland) Śląsk Wrocław	(Germany) ratiopharm Ulm	Unseeded in eighthfinals

== Bracket ==
Eighthfinals
(Spain) Valencia Basket	98
(Germany) Hamburg Towers	80
(France) Metropolitans 92	87
(Italy) Umana Reyer Venezia	66
(Italy) Virtus Segafredo Bologna	75
(Lithuania) Lietkabelis	67
(Spain) Joventut	73
(Germany) ratiopharm Ulm	79
(Spain) Gran Canaria	87
(Poland) Śląsk Wrocław	60
(Spain) MoraBanc Andorra	74
(Montenegro) Budućnost VOLI	64
(Slovenia) Cedevita Olimpija	93
(Turkey) Türk Telekom	80
(Serbia) Partizan NIS	95
(Turkey) Frutti Extra Bursaspor	103

Quarterfinals
(Spain) Valencia Basket	98
(France) Metropolitans 92	85
(Italy) Virtus Segafredo Bologna	83
(Germany) ratiopharm Ulm	77
(Spain) Gran Canaria	77
(Spain) MoraBanc Andorra	79
(Slovenia) Cedevita Olimpija	83
(Turkey) Frutti Extra Bursaspor	85

Semifinals
(Spain) Valencia Basket	73
(Italy) Virtus Segafredo Bologna	83
(Spain) MoraBanc Andorra	68
(Turkey) Frutti Extra Bursaspor	85

Final
(Italy) Virtus Segafredo Bologna	80
(Turkey) Frutti Extra Bursaspor	67

== Eighthfinals ==
=== Summary ===
The eighthfinals were played on 19–20 April 2022.

Team 1	Score	Team 2
Joventut (Spain)	73–79	(Germany) ratiopharm Ulm
Virtus Segafredo Bologna (Italy)	75–67	(Lithuania) Lietkabelis
Metropolitans 92 (France)	87–66	(Italy) Umana Reyer Venezia
Valencia Basket (Spain)	98–80	(Germany) Hamburg Towers
Gran Canaria (Spain)	87–60	(Poland) Śląsk Wrocław
MoraBanc Andorra (Spain)	74–64	(Montenegro) Budućnost VOLI
Cedevita Olimpija (Slovenia)	93–80	(Turkey) Türk Telekom
Partizan NIS (Serbia)	95–103	(Turkey) Frutti Extra Bursaspor

=== Matches ===
19 April 2022	Joventut (Spain)	73–79	(Germany) ratiopharm Ulm	Badalona
20:30	Scoring by quarter: 17–18, 18–14, 19–19, 19–28
	Pts: Willis 17; Rebs: Parra 6 Asts: Ribas, Tomić 5 PIR: Willis 21	Boxscore	Pts: Blossomgame, Christon 21; Rebs: Thornwell 9 Asts: Christon 6 PIR: Christon 31	Arena: Palau Municipal d'Esports; Attendance: 6,623; Referees: Ilija Belošević, Leandro Lezcano, Adar Peer

20 April 2022	Virtus Segafredo Bologna (Italy)	75–67	(Lithuania) Lietkabelis	Bologna
20:45	Scoring by quarter: 18–14, 21–20, 17–18, 19–15
	Pts: Jaiteh 20; Rebs: Hervey, Shengelia 5 Asts: Shengelia 8 PIR: Weems 22	Boxscore	Pts: Orelik, Radičević 12; Rebs: Maldūnas 9 Asts: Kalaitzakis, Žemaitis 4 PIR: Maldūnas 15	Arena: Virtus Segafredo Arena; Attendance: 3,517; Referees: Robert Lottermoser, Tomasz Trawicki, Maxime Boubert

20 April 2022	Metropolitans 92 (France)	87–66	(Italy) Umana Reyer Venezia	Levallois
20:00	Scoring by quarter: 19–13, 21–17, 27–10, 20–26
	Pts: Hornsby, Hunter 14; Rebs: Hunter 10; Asts: three players 4 PIR: Hunter 23	Boxscore	Pts: Watt 11; Rebs: Stone 5 Asts: Stone 10; PIR: three players 12	Arena: Palais des sports Marcel-Cerdan; Attendance: 2,478; Referees: Miguel Ángel Pérez, Miloš Koljenšić, Gentian Cici

20 April 2022	Valencia Basket (Spain)	98–80	(Germany) Hamburg Towers	Valencia
20:30	Scoring by quarter: 19–22, 29–19, 25–17, 25–22
	Pts: Rivero 21; Rebs: Dubljević 9 Asts: Hermannsson 6 PIR: Rivero 25	Boxscore	Pts: Kotsar 23; Rebs: Kotsar 6 Asts: Hollatz 9 PIR: Kotsar 28	Arena: La Fonteta; Attendance: 5,386; Referees: Matej Boltauzer, Rain Peerandi, Hugues Thépenier

20 April 2022	Gran Canaria (Spain)	87–60	(Poland) Śląsk Wrocław	Las Palmas
21:00 (20:00 WEST)	Scoring by quarter: 25–18, 17–9, 22–24, 23–9
	Pts: Brussino 15; Rebs: Brussino, Diop 8 Asts: Albicy 5 PIR: Brussino 18	Boxscore	Pts: Kanter 16; Rebs: Kanter, Tomczak 5 Asts: Trice 6 PIR: Trice 20	Arena: Gran Canaria Arena; Attendance: 3,573; Referees: Mehdi Difallah, Robert Vyklický, Sérgio Silva

19 April 2022	MoraBanc Andorra (Spain)	74–64	(Montenegro) Budućnost VOLI	Andorra la Vella
20:45	Scoring by quarter: 23–26, 12–13, 23–12, 16–13
	Pts: Hannah 21; Rebs: Crawford 9 Asts: Miller-McIntyre 6 PIR: Hannah 19	Boxscore	Pts: Seeley 25; Rebs: Tarolis 4 Asts: Cobbs 3 PIR: Seeley 31	Arena: Poliesportiu d'Andorra; Attendance: 823; Referees: Boris Ryzhyk, Elias Koromilas, Saulius Račys

19 April 2022	Cedevita Olimpija (Slovenia)	93–80	(Turkey) Türk Telekom	Ljubljana
19:00	Scoring by quarter: 29–16, 31–22, 20–14, 13–28
	Pts: Blažič 20; Rebs: Omić 16; Asts: Ferrell 7 PIR: Omić 28	Boxscore	Pts: Johnson 16; Rebs: Ellis, Johnson 5 Asts: Pérez 10; PIR: Gülaslan 18	Arena: Arena Stožice; Attendance: 8,000; Referees: Benjamín Jiménez, Marcin Kowalski, Eduard Udyanskyy

20 April 2022	Partizan NIS (Serbia)	95–103(OT)	(Turkey) Frutti Extra Bursaspor	Belgrade
20:30	Scoring by quarter: 20–20, 18–17, 22–27, 24–20, Overtime: 11–19
	Pts: Avramović 23; Rebs: Koprivica 10; Asts: Avramović 6 PIR: Lessort 25	Boxscore	Pts: Andrews 24; Rebs: Bitim, Hayes 10; Asts: Andrews 10; PIR: Andrews 35	Arena: Štark Arena; Attendance: 19,224; Referees: Daniel Hierrezuelo, Carmelo Paternicò, Joseph Bissang

== Quarterfinals ==
=== Summary ===
The quarterfinals were played on 26–27 April 2022.

Team 1	Score	Team 2
Virtus Segafredo Bologna (Italy)	83–77	(Germany) ratiopharm Ulm
Valencia Basket (Spain)	98–85	(France) Metropolitans 92
Gran Canaria (Spain)	77–79	(Spain) MoraBanc Andorra
Cedevita Olimpija (Slovenia)	83–85	(Turkey) Frutti Extra Bursaspor

=== Matches ===
26 April 2022	Virtus Segafredo Bologna (Italy)	83–77	(Germany) ratiopharm Ulm	Bologna
21:00	Scoring by quarter: 25–17, 18–28, 24–17, 16–15
	Pts: Jaiteh 27; Rebs: Jaiteh 11; Asts: Teodosić 8 PIR: Jaiteh 38	Boxscore	Pts: Blossomgame 22; Rebs: Bretzel, Thornwell 8 Asts: Christon 7 PIR: Christon, Klepeisz 18	Arena: PalaDozza; Attendance: 5,037; Referees: Miguel Ángel Pérez, Miloš Koljenšić, Eduard Udyanskyy

27 April 2022	Valencia Basket (Spain)	98–85	(France) Metropolitans 92	Valencia
20:30	Scoring by quarter: 32–26, 24–20, 23–22, 19–17
	Pts: Rivero 21; Rebs: Dubljević 13; Asts: Hermannsson 11; PIR: Dubljević 32	Boxscore	Pts: Cummings 31; Rebs: Hunter 6 Asts: three players 3 PIR: Cummings 37	Arena: La Fonteta; Attendance: 5,446; Referees: Carmelo Paternicò, Sašo Petek, Adar Peer

26 April 2022	Gran Canaria (Spain)	77–79	(Spain) MoraBanc Andorra	Las Palmas
21:00 (20:00 WEST)	Scoring by quarter: 23–20, 19–15, 21–22, 14–22
	Pts: Pustovyi 12; Rebs: Brussino 9 Asts: Albicy 6 PIR: Pustovyi 19	Boxscore	Pts: Miller-McIntyre, Jelínek 17; Rebs: four players 4 Asts: Miller-McIntyre 9 PIR: Miller-McIntyre 22	Arena: Gran Canaria Arena; Attendance: 3,656; Referees: Fernando Rocha, Rain Peerandi, Maxime Boubert

27 April 2022	Cedevita Olimpija (Slovenia)	83–85	(Turkey) Frutti Extra Bursaspor	Ljubljana
20:00	Scoring by quarter: 21–23, 15–27, 28–17, 19–18
	Pts: Ferrell 20; Rebs: Dragić 7 Asts: Ferrell 5 PIR: Ferrell 30	Boxscore	Pts: Needham 20; Rebs: Hayes, Holland 7 Asts: three players 4 PIR: Holland, Needham 18	Arena: Arena Stožice; Attendance: 12,500; Referees: Luigi Lamonica, Saulius Račys, Gentian Cici

== Semifinals ==
=== Summary ===
The semifinals were played on 3–4 May 2022.

Team 1	Score	Team 2
Valencia Basket (Spain)	73–83	(Italy) Virtus Segafredo Bologna
MoraBanc Andorra (Spain)	68–85	(Turkey) Frutti Extra Bursaspor

=== Matches ===
4 May 2022	Valencia Basket (Spain)	73–83	(Italy) Virtus Segafredo Bologna	Valencia
20:30	Scoring by quarter: 19–27, 19–23, 19–12, 16–21
	Pts: Rivero 17; Rebs: four players 6 Asts: Hermannsson 7 PIR: López-Arostegui 17	Boxscore	Pts: Shengelia 15; Rebs: Jaiteh 6 Asts: Teodosić 4 PIR: Shengelia 16	Arena: La Fonteta; Attendance: 7,224; Referees: Damir Javor, Gytis Vilius, Uroš Nikolić

3 May 2022	MoraBanc Andorra (Spain)	68–85	(Turkey) Frutti Extra Bursaspor	Andorra la Vella
20:00	Scoring by quarter: 20–22, 14–16, 25–22, 12–22
	Pts: Paulí 16; Rebs: Paulí 9 Asts: Miller-McIntyre, Paulí 5 PIR: Paulí 28	Boxscore	Pts: Andrews 20; Rebs: Hayes 16; Asts: Needham 7 PIR: Hayes 27	Arena: Poliesportiu d'Andorra; Attendance: 4,456; Referees: Ilija Belošević, Milan Nedović, Eduard Udyanskyy

== Final ==
=== Summary ===
The final was played on 11 May 2022 at the Virtus Segafredo Arena in Bologna.

Team 1	Score	Team 2
Virtus Segafredo Bologna (Italy)	80–67	(Turkey) Frutti Extra Bursaspor

=== Match details ===
11 May 2022	Virtus Segafredo Bologna (Italy)	80–67	(Turkey) Frutti Extra Bursaspor	Bologna
20:30	Scoring by quarter: 25–12, 16–19, 21–22, 18–14
	Pts: Teodosić 21; Rebs: Jaiteh 10; Asts: Pajola 6 PIR: Weems 16	Boxscore	Pts: Dudzinski 14; Rebs: Dudzinski 7 Asts: Andrews, Bitim 3 PIR: Hayes 20	Arena: Virtus Segafredo Arena; Attendance: 10,000; Referees: Saša Pukl, Anne Panther, Emilio Pérez

== See also ==
- 2022 EuroLeague Playoffs
- 2021–22 EuroCup Basketball
