= 2021–22 EuroCup Basketball =

20th season of Europe's secondary club basketball tournament

2021–22 7DAYS EuroCup^{1}
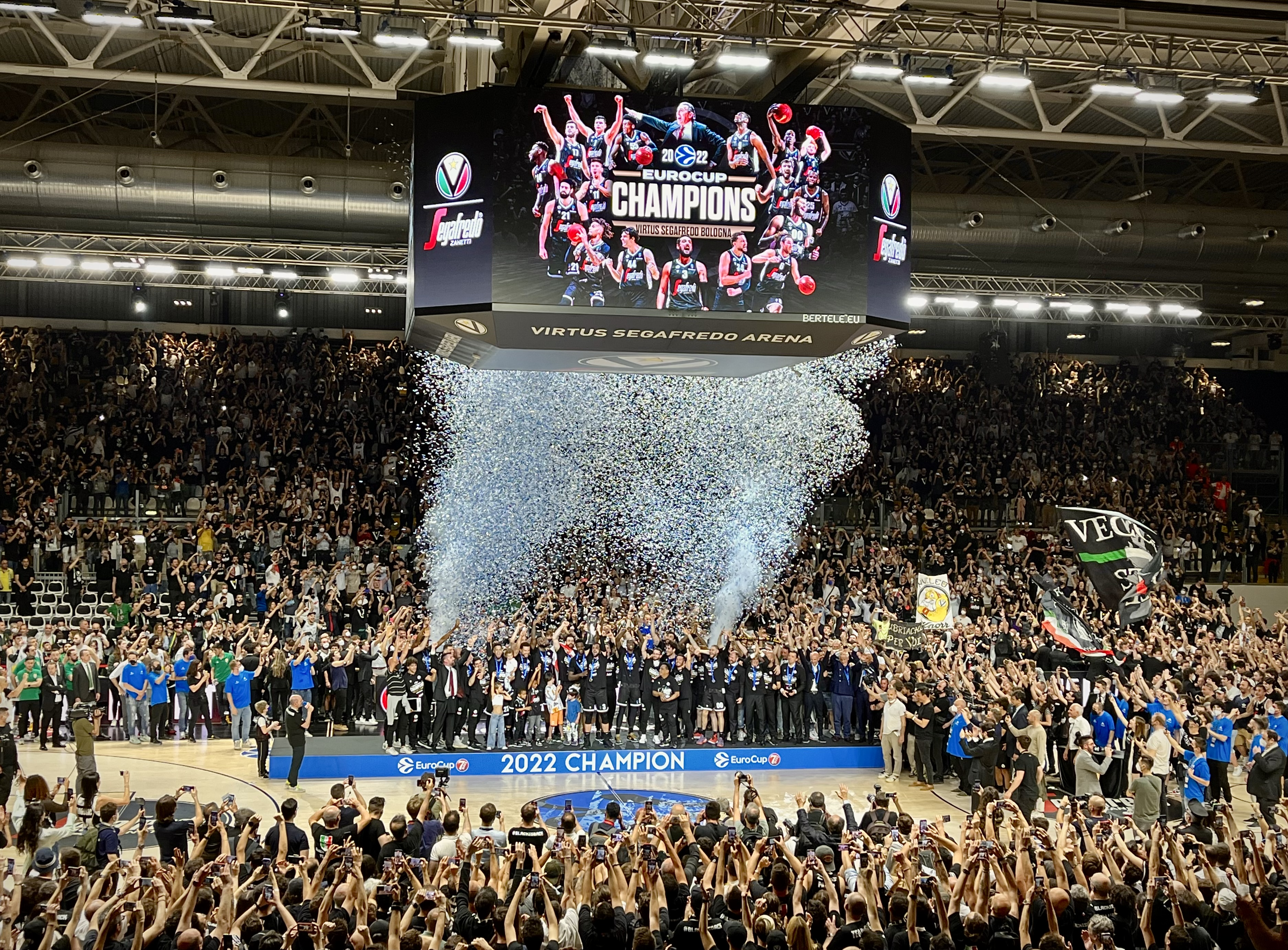
- Virtus Segafredo Bologna celebrating the victory
- Season: 2021–22
- Dates: 19 October 2021 – 11 May 2022
- Games played: 177
- Teams: 20

Regular season
- Season MVP: Mouhammadou Jaiteh

Finals
- Champions: (Italian Basketball Federation) Virtus Segafredo Bologna (1st title)
- Runners-up: (Turkish Basketball Federation) Frutti Extra Bursaspor
- Semi-finalists: (Spanish Basketball Federation) MoraBanc Andorra (Spanish Basketball Federation) Valencia Basket
- Finals MVP: Miloš Teodosić

Awards
- Coach of the Year: Dušan Alimpijević
- Rising Star: Khalifa Diop

Statistical leaders
Points	Errick McCollum	22.3
Rebounds	Kerem Kanter	8.8
Assists	Miloš Teodosić	7.9
Index Rating	Errick McCollum	24.2

Records
- Biggest home win: Partizan 97–65 Trento (12 January 2022); Valencia 103–71 Ulm (5 April 2022)
- Biggest away win: Trento 56–86 Joventut (19 October 2021)
- Highest scoring: Cedevita 101–104 Virtus (8 December 2021)
- ^{1} Sponsored name, referring to 7DAYS.

The 2021–22 EuroCup Basketball season was the 20th season of Euroleague Basketball's secondary level professional club basketball tournament. It was the 14th season since it was renamed from the ULEB Cup to the EuroCup, and the sixth season under the title sponsorship name of 7DAYS.

Virtus Bologna defeated Bursaspor Basketbol in the final, which was played at the Segafredo Arena in Bologna, to win their first EuroCup title. As winners, Virtus automatically qualified for the 2022–23 EuroLeague.

The defending champions were AS Monaco, who were unable to defend their title as they played in the 2021–22 EuroLeague.

== Team allocation ==
A total of 20 teams from 10 leagues participated in the 2021–22 EuroCup Basketball.

=== Teams ===
League positions after the playoffs of the previous season are shown in parentheses.

Qualified teams for 2021–22 EuroCup Basketball
Regular season
(Spanish Basketball Federation) Valencia Basket (4th)	(Basketball Federation of Slovenia) Cedevita Olimpija (5th)	(French Federation of Basketball) Mincidelice JL Bourg (5th)	(Turkish Basketball Federation) Frutti Extra Bursaspor (9th)
(Spanish Basketball Federation) Joventut (7th)	(Basketball Federation of Serbia) Partizan NIS (7th)	(French Federation of Basketball) Metropolitans 92 (6th)	(Hellenic Basketball Federation) Promitheas (4th)
(Spanish Basketball Federation) Gran Canaria (8th)	(Italian Basketball Federation) Virtus Segafredo Bologna (1st)	(German Basketball Federation) ratiopharm Ulm (4th)	(Lithuanian Basketball Federation) Lietkabelis (3rd)
(Spanish Basketball Federation) MoraBanc Andorra (9th)	(Italian Basketball Federation) Umana Reyer Venezia (4th)	(German Basketball Federation) Hamburg Towers (7th)	(Polish Basketball Federation) Śląsk Wrocław (3rd)
(Basketball Federation of Montenegro) Budućnost VOLI (2nd)	(Italian Basketball Federation) Dolomiti Energia Trento (8th)	(Turkish Basketball Federation) Türk Telekom (6th)	(Russian Basketball Federation) Lokomotiv Kuban (4th)

Notes

1. ABA League (ABA): Budućnost VOLI, Cedevita Olimpija and Partizan NIS qualified through the ABA League.

== Round and draw dates ==
The schedule of the competition was as follows.

Schedule for 2021–22 EuroCup Basketball
Phase	Round	Draw date	Round date
Regular season	Round 1	9 July 2021	19–20 October 2021
Regular season	Round 2	9 July 2021	26–27 October 2021
Regular season	Round 3	9 July 2021	2–3 November 2021
Regular season	Round 4	9 July 2021	9–10 November 2021
Regular season	Round 5	9 July 2021	16–17 November 2021
Regular season	Round 6	9 July 2021	7–8 December 2021
Regular season	Round 7	9 July 2021	14–15 December 2021
Regular season	Round 8	9 July 2021	21–22 December 2021
Regular season	Round 9	9 July 2021	11–12 January 2022
Regular season	Round 10	9 July 2021	18–19 January 2022
Regular season	Round 11	9 July 2021	25–26 January 2022
Regular season	Round 12	9 July 2021	1–2 February 2022
Regular season	Round 13	9 July 2021	8–9 February 2022
Regular season	Round 14	9 July 2021	8–9 March 2022
Regular season	Round 15	9 July 2021	15–16 March 2022
Regular season	Round 16	9 July 2021	22–23 March 2022
Regular season	Round 17	9 July 2021	29–30 March 2022
Regular season	Round 18	9 July 2021	5–6 April 2022
Playoffs	Eighthfinals	9 July 2021	19–20 April 2022
Playoffs	Quarterfinals	9 July 2021	26–27 April 2022
Playoffs	Semifinals	9 July 2021	3–4 May 2022
Playoffs	Final	9 July 2021	11 May 2022

=== Draw ===
The draw was held on 9 July 2021 in Barcelona, Spain.

The 20 teams were drawn into two groups of 10, with the restriction that teams from the same league could not be drawn against each other, except when there were more than two teams from the same league participating in the regular season. For the draw, the teams were seeded into 10 pots, in accordance with the Club Ranking, based on their performance in European competitions during a three-year period and the lowest possible position that any club from that league can occupy in the draw was calculated by adding the results of the worst performing team from each league.

Pot 1 Team (Spanish Basketball Federation) Valencia Basket (Spanish Basketball Federation) MoraBanc Andorra	Pot 2 Team (Hellenic Basketball Federation) Promitheas (Russian Basketball Federation) Lokomotiv Kuban	Pot 3 Team (Spanish Basketball Federation) Gran Canaria (Spanish Basketball Federation) Joventut	Pot 4 Team (Basketball Federation of Montenegro) Budućnost VOLI (Basketball Federation of Serbia) Partizan NIS
Pot 5 Team (Italian Basketball Federation) Virtus Segafredo Bologna (Lithuanian Basketball Federation) Lietkabelis	Pot 6 Team (Basketball Federation of Slovenia) Cedevita Olimpija (Italian Basketball Federation) Dolomiti Energia Trento	Pot 7 Team (French Federation of Basketball) Metropolitans 92 (French Federation of Basketball) Mincidelice JL Bourg	Pot 8 Team (German Basketball Federation) ratiopharm Ulm (Turkish Basketball Federation) Türk Telekom
Pot 9 Team (Turkish Basketball Federation) Frutti Extra Bursaspor (German Basketball Federation) Hamburg Towers	Pot 10 Team (Italian Basketball Federation) Umana Reyer Venezia (Polish Basketball Federation) Śląsk Wrocław

The fixtures were decided after the draw, using a computer draw not shown to public, with the following match sequence:

Note: Positions for scheduling do not use the seeding pots, e.g., Team 1 is not necessarily the team from Pot 1 in the draw.

Round	Matches
Round 1	10 v 5, 6 v 4, 7 v 3, 8 v 2, 9 v 1
Round 2	1 v 10, 2 v 9, 3 v 8, 4 v 7, 5 v 6
Round 3	10 v 6, 7 v 5, 8 v 4, 9 v 3, 1 v 2
Round 4	2 v 10, 3 v 1, 4 v 9, 5 v 8, 6 v 7
Round 5	10 v 7, 8 v 6, 9 v 5, 1 v 4, 2 v 3
Round 6	3 v 10, 4 v 2, 5 v 1, 6 v 9, 7 v 8
Round 7	10 v 8, 9 v 7, 1 v 6, 2 v 5, 3 v 4
Round 8	10 v 4, 5 v 3, 6 v 2, 7 v 1, 8 v 9
Round 9	9 v 10, 1 v 8, 2 v 7, 3 v 6, 4 v 5

Round	Matches
Round 10	5 v 10, 4 v 6, 3 v 7, 2 v 8, 1 v 9
Round 11	10 v 1, 9 v 2, 8 v 3, 7 v 4, 6 v 5
Round 12	6 v 10, 5 v 7, 4 v 8, 3 v 9, 2 v 1
Round 13	10 v 2, 1 v 3, 9 v 4, 8 v 5, 7 v 6
Round 14	7 v 10, 6 v 8, 5 v 9, 4 v 1, 3 v 2
Round 15	10 v 3, 2 v 4, 1 v 5, 9 v 6, 8 v 7
Round 16	8 v 10, 7 v 9, 6 v 1, 5 v 2, 4 v 3
Round 17	4 v 10, 3 v 5, 2 v 6, 1 v 7, 9 v 8
Round 18	10 v 9, 8 v 1, 7 v 2, 6 v 3, 5 v 4

There were scheduling restrictions: for example, teams from the same city in general were not scheduled to play at home in the same round (to avoid them playing at home on the same day or on consecutive days, due to logistics and crowd control).

== Regular season ==
Location of teams of the 2021–22 EuroCup.
Red: Group A; Green: Group B.

The 20 teams were divided into two groups of 10 teams each. In each group, teams played against each other home-and-away in a round-robin format for a total of 18 games played by each team. The top eight teams from each group advanced to the playoffs, while the last two teams from each group were eliminated. The regular season started on 19 October 2021 and ended on 6 April 2022.

=== Group A ===
==== Standings ====
Pos	Team	Pld	W	L	PF	PA	PD	Qualification
1	(Spanish Basketball Federation) Joventut	16	12	4	1297	1130	+167	Advance to eighthfinals
2	(Basketball Federation of Serbia) Partizan NIS	16	12	4	1353	1204	+149	Advance to eighthfinals
3	(French Federation of Basketball) Metropolitans 92	16	11	5	1314	1256	+58	Advance to eighthfinals
4	(Spanish Basketball Federation) MoraBanc Andorra	16	10	6	1304	1271	+33	Advance to eighthfinals
5	(Lithuanian Basketball Federation) Lietkabelis	16	9	7	1263	1181	+82	Advance to eighthfinals
6	(Turkish Basketball Federation) Türk Telekom	16	8	8	1211	1252	−41	Advance to eighthfinals
7	(German Basketball Federation) Hamburg Towers	16	6	10	1315	1411	−96	Advance to eighthfinals
8	(Polish Basketball Federation) Śląsk Wrocław	16	3	13	1190	1320	−130	Advance to eighthfinals
9	(Italian Basketball Federation) Dolomiti Energia Trento	16	1	15	1112	1334	−222	
10	(Russian Basketball Federation) Lokomotiv Kuban (Note: Lokomotiv Kuban was withdrawn from the EuroCup due to the 2022 Russian invasion of Ukraine.)	0	0	0	0	0	0	Withdrawn

Source: EuroCup
Rules for classification: All points scored in extra period(s) were not counted in the standings, nor for any tie-break situation.

==== Results ====
Home \ Away	MBA	LOK	CJB	PAR	LIE	TRE	MET	TTA	HHT	WKS
MoraBanc Andorra	—	~~76–86~~	72–71	61–60	81–76	85–73	74–83	98–75	78–85	99–65
Lokomotiv Kuban	~~93–82~~	—	—	~~101–94~~	~~90–62~~	~~97–95~~	~~99–85~~	—	—	—
Joventut	90–80	~~100–77~~	—	92–84	65–50	82–65	86–63	76–67	73–56	97–79
Partizan NIS	95–70	—	68–67	—	84–77	97–65	87–72	85–59	102–77	75–73
Lietkabelis	88–75	~~84–85~~	87–77	93–78	—	74–57	96–89	75–77	96–100	88–65
Dolomiti Energia Trento	71–82	—	56–86	63–79	61–77	—	80–86	70–76	90–99	81–77
Metropolitans 92	81–74	~~95–92~~	86–78	82–89	76–69	93–80	—	99–82	85–62	86–83
Türk Telekom	76–83	~~88–85~~	69–78	85–71	65–60	82–75	73–65	—	95–70	89–73
Hamburg Towers	91–97	~~100–82~~	75–92	97–106	72–87	90–69	84–94	94–74	—	92–86
Śląsk Wrocław	91–95	~~68–98~~	73–87	71–93	59–70	77–68	59–74	80–67	87–71	—

Source: EuroCup
Legend: Blue = home team win; Red = away team win.
Matches with lighter background shading were decided after overtime.

=== Group B ===
==== Standings ====
Pos	Team	Pld	W	L	PF	PA	PD	Qualification
1	(Spanish Basketball Federation) Gran Canaria	18	12	6	1453	1366	+87	Advance to eighthfinals
2	(Spanish Basketball Federation) Valencia Basket	18	12	6	1554	1440	+114	Advance to eighthfinals
3	(Basketball Federation of Slovenia) Cedevita Olimpija	18	11	7	1540	1479	+61	Advance to eighthfinals
4	(Italian Basketball Federation) Virtus Segafredo Bologna	18	11	7	1519	1465	+54	Advance to eighthfinals
5	(Basketball Federation of Montenegro) Budućnost VOLI	18	10	8	1413	1420	−7	Advance to eighthfinals
6	(Italian Basketball Federation) Umana Reyer Venezia	18	9	9	1380	1355	+25	Advance to eighthfinals
7	(Turkish Basketball Federation) Frutti Extra Bursaspor	18	8	10	1459	1499	−40	Advance to eighthfinals
8	(German Basketball Federation) ratiopharm Ulm	18	7	11	1432	1465	−33	Advance to eighthfinals
9	(French Federation of Basketball) Mincidelice JL Bourg	18	6	12	1415	1471	−56	
10	(Hellenic Basketball Federation) Promitheas	18	4	14	1279	1484	−205	

Source: EuroCup
Rules for classification: All points scored in extra period(s) were not counted in the standings, nor for any tie-break situation.

==== Results ====
Home \ Away	VBC	PRO	GCA	BUD	VIR	COL	JLB	ULM	FEB	URV
Valencia Basket	—	92–82	89–90	103–76	83–77	85–97	98–95	103–71	86–68	86–80
Promitheas	68–71	—	81–85	60–89	61–83	67–88	84–77	79–68	83–80	68–78
Gran Canaria	91–90	81–62	—	84–64	100–80	77–79	78–49	81–96	87–81	69–76
Budućnost VOLI	71–70	90–77	76–83	—	86–82	91–60	73–75	68–89	83–82	72–82
Virtus Segafredo Bologna	96–97	91–72	70–68	62–68	—	74–86	83–82	87–76	98–94	90–84
Cedevita Olimpija	82–76	98–84	60–75	92–78	101–104	—	91–79	96–101	103–86	105–90
Mincidelice JL Bourg	77–88	92–62	78–76	82–86	68–90	76–69	—	72–85	95–65	62–73
ratiopharm Ulm	70–76	65–71	93–94	79–86	84–68	96–104	96–86	—	72–86	90–83
Frutti Extra Bursaspor	92–89	87–76	74–85	86–89	83–101	93–84	96–89	68–66	—	80–66
Umana Reyer Venezia	67–81	81–57	77–59	72–67	72–83	77–70	78–81	89–79	62–70	—

Source: EuroCup
Legend: Blue = home team win; Red = away team win.
Matches with lighter background shading were decided after overtime.

== Playoffs ==
In the playoffs, teams played against each other in a single-game format. The higher ranked regular season team in each matchup enjoyed home court advantage.

=== Bracket ===
Eighthfinals
(Spanish Basketball Federation) Valencia Basket	98
(German Basketball Federation) Hamburg Towers	80
(French Federation of Basketball) Metropolitans 92	87
(Italian Basketball Federation) Umana Reyer Venezia	66
(Italian Basketball Federation) Virtus Segafredo Bologna	75
(Lithuanian Basketball Federation) Lietkabelis	67
(Spanish Basketball Federation) Joventut	73
(German Basketball Federation) ratiopharm Ulm	79
(Spanish Basketball Federation) Gran Canaria	87
(Polish Basketball Federation) Śląsk Wrocław	60
(Spanish Basketball Federation) MoraBanc Andorra	74
(Basketball Federation of Montenegro) Budućnost VOLI	64
(Basketball Federation of Slovenia) Cedevita Olimpija	93
(Turkish Basketball Federation) Türk Telekom	80
(Basketball Federation of Serbia) Partizan NIS	95
(Turkish Basketball Federation) Frutti Extra Bursaspor	103

Quarterfinals
(Spanish Basketball Federation) Valencia Basket	98
(French Federation of Basketball) Metropolitans 92	85
(Italian Basketball Federation) Virtus Segafredo Bologna	83
(German Basketball Federation) ratiopharm Ulm	77
(Spanish Basketball Federation) Gran Canaria	77
(Spanish Basketball Federation) MoraBanc Andorra	79
(Basketball Federation of Slovenia) Cedevita Olimpija	83
(Turkish Basketball Federation) Frutti Extra Bursaspor	85

Semifinals
(Spanish Basketball Federation) Valencia Basket	73
(Italian Basketball Federation) Virtus Segafredo Bologna	83
(Spanish Basketball Federation) MoraBanc Andorra	68
(Turkish Basketball Federation) Frutti Extra Bursaspor	85

Final
(Italian Basketball Federation) Virtus Segafredo Bologna	80
(Turkish Basketball Federation) Frutti Extra Bursaspor	67

=== Eighthfinals ===
The eighthfinals were played on 19–20 April 2022.

Team 1	Score	Team 2
Joventut (Spanish Basketball Federation)	73–79	(German Basketball Federation) ratiopharm Ulm
Virtus Segafredo Bologna (Italian Basketball Federation)	75–67	(Lithuanian Basketball Federation) Lietkabelis
Metropolitans 92 (French Federation of Basketball)	87–66	(Italian Basketball Federation) Umana Reyer Venezia
Valencia Basket (Spanish Basketball Federation)	98–80	(German Basketball Federation) Hamburg Towers
Gran Canaria (Spanish Basketball Federation)	87–60	(Polish Basketball Federation) Śląsk Wrocław
MoraBanc Andorra (Spanish Basketball Federation)	74–64	(Basketball Federation of Montenegro) Budućnost VOLI
Cedevita Olimpija (Basketball Federation of Slovenia)	93–80	(Turkish Basketball Federation) Türk Telekom
Partizan NIS (Basketball Federation of Serbia)	95–103	(Turkish Basketball Federation) Frutti Extra Bursaspor

=== Quarterfinals ===
The quarterfinals were played on 26–27 April 2022.

Team 1	Score	Team 2
Virtus Segafredo Bologna (Italian Basketball Federation)	83–77	(German Basketball Federation) ratiopharm Ulm
Valencia Basket (Spanish Basketball Federation)	98–85	(French Federation of Basketball) Metropolitans 92
Gran Canaria (Spanish Basketball Federation)	77–79	(Spanish Basketball Federation) MoraBanc Andorra
Cedevita Olimpija (Basketball Federation of Slovenia)	83–85	(Turkish Basketball Federation) Frutti Extra Bursaspor

=== Semifinals ===
The semifinals were played on 3–4 May 2022.

Team 1	Score	Team 2
Valencia Basket (Spanish Basketball Federation)	73–83	(Italian Basketball Federation) Virtus Segafredo Bologna
MoraBanc Andorra (Spanish Basketball Federation)	68–85	(Turkish Basketball Federation) Frutti Extra Bursaspor

=== Final ===
The final was played on 11 May 2022 at the Virtus Segafredo Arena in Bologna.

Team 1	Score	Team 2
Virtus Segafredo Bologna (Italian Basketball Federation)	80–67	(Turkish Basketball Federation) Frutti Extra Bursaspor

== Statistics ==
=== Individual statistics ===
==== Rating ====
Rank	Name	Team	Games	Rating	PIR
1.	(United States) Errick McCollum	(Russian Basketball Federation) Lokomotiv Kuban	12	290	24.2
2.	(United States) Will Cummings	(French Federation of Basketball) Metropolitans 92	20	422	21.1
3.	(United States) Semaj Christon	(German Basketball Federation) ratiopharm Ulm	18	361	20.1

Source: EuroCup

==== Points ====
Rank	Name	Team	Games	Points	PPG
1.	(United States) Errick McCollum	(Russian Basketball Federation) Lokomotiv Kuban	12	267	22.3
2.	(United States) Will Cummings	(French Federation of Basketball) Metropolitans 92	20	357	17.9
3.	(United States) Semaj Christon	(German Basketball Federation) ratiopharm Ulm	18	314	17.4

Source: EuroCup

==== Rebounds ====
Rank	Name	Team	Games	Rebounds	RPG
1.	(Turkey) Kerem Kanter	(Polish Basketball Federation) Śląsk Wrocław	17	149	8.8
2.	(United States) Jaron Blossomgame	(German Basketball Federation) ratiopharm Ulm	19	145	7.6
3.	(France) Mouhammadou Jaiteh	(Italian Basketball Federation) Virtus Segafredo Bologna	21	160	7.6

Source: EuroCup

==== Assists ====
Rank	Name	Team	Games	Assists	APG
1.	(Serbia) Miloš Teodosić	(Italian Basketball Federation) Virtus Segafredo Bologna	15	118	7.9
2.	(United States) Codi Miller-McIntyre	(Spanish Basketball Federation) MoraBanc Andorra	21	145	6.9
3.	(United States) Travis Trice	(Polish Basketball Federation) Śląsk Wrocław	15	99	6.6

Source: EuroCup

==== Blocks ====
Rank	Name	Team	Games	Blocks	BPG
1.	(United States) Octavius Ellis	(Turkish Basketball Federation) Türk Telekom	15	22	1.5
2.	(Serbia) Balša Koprivica	(Basketball Federation of Serbia) Partizan NIS	17	20	1.2
3.	(Central African Republic) Kevarrius Hayes	(Turkish Basketball Federation) Frutti Extra Bursaspor	22	25	1.1

Source: EuroCup

==== Other statistics ====
Category	Player	Team	Games	Average
Steals	(France) Andrew Albicy	(Spanish Basketball Federation) Gran Canaria	15	1.8
Turnovers	(United States) Travis Trice	(Polish Basketball Federation) Śląsk Wrocław	15	3.3
Fouls drawn	(United States) Will Cummings	(French Federation of Basketball) Metropolitans 92	20	6.0
Minutes	(United States) Jaron Blossomgame	(German Basketball Federation) ratiopharm Ulm	19	33:24
FT %	(Austria) Thomas Klepeisz	(German Basketball Federation) ratiopharm Ulm	19	93.9%
FT %	(Italy) Marco Belinelli	(Italian Basketball Federation) Virtus Segafredo Bologna	16	93.9%
2-Point %	(Spain) Jaime Pradilla	(Spanish Basketball Federation) Valencia Basket	20	79.8%
3-Point %	(France) Maxime Courby	(French Federation of Basketball) Mincidelice JL Bourg	12	64.0%

=== Individual game highs ===
Category	Player	Team	Statistic	Opponent
Rating	(United States) Caleb Homesley	(German Basketball Federation) Hamburg Towers	45	(Turkish Basketball Federation) Türk Telekom (Jan 11, 2022)
Points	(United States) Andrew Andrews	(Turkish Basketball Federation) Frutti Extra Bursaspor	37	(Italian Basketball Federation) Virtus Segafredo Bologna (Mar 3, 2022)
Rebounds	Three times		16	—
Assists	Six times		13	—
Steals	(Italy) Alessandro Pajola	(Italian Basketball Federation) Virtus Segafredo Bologna	6	(German Basketball Federation) ratiopharm Ulm (Oct 27, 2021)
Blocks	(Central African Republic) Kevarrius Hayes	(Turkish Basketball Federation) Frutti Extra Bursaspor	6	(German Basketball Federation) ratiopharm Ulm (Mar 29, 2022)

=== Team statistics ===
Category	Team	Average
Rating	(Spanish Basketball Federation) Valencia Basket	102.4
Points	(Russian Basketball Federation) Lokomotiv Kuban	90.4
Rebounds	(Spanish Basketball Federation) Valencia Basket	39.0
Assists	(Italian Basketball Federation) Virtus Segafredo Bologna	22.1
Steals	(German Basketball Federation) Hamburg Towers	9.2
Blocks	(Basketball Federation of Serbia) Partizan NIS	3.3
Turnovers	(Lithuanian Basketball Federation) Lietkabelis	15.9
FT %	(Basketball Federation of Montenegro) Budućnost VOLI	80.4%
2-Point %	(Spanish Basketball Federation) Joventut	57.7%
3-Point %	(French Federation of Basketball) Mincidelice JL Bourg	42.1%

== Awards ==
=== EuroCup MVP ===
Player	Team	Ref.
(France) Mouhammadou Jaiteh	(Italian Basketball Federation) Virtus Segafredo Bologna	

=== EuroCup Final MVP ===
Player	Team	Ref.
(Serbia) Miloš Teodosić	(Italian Basketball Federation) Virtus Segafredo Bologna	

=== All–7DAYS EuroCup Teams ===
All–7DAYS EuroCup First Team		All–7DAYS EuroCup Second Team		Ref
Player	Team	Player	Team	Ref
(United States) Jaron Blossomgame	(German Basketball Federation) ratiopharm Ulm	(Montenegro) Bojan Dubljević	(Spanish Basketball Federation) Valencia Basket	
(United States) Will Cummings	(French Federation of Basketball) Metropolitans 92	(United States) Kevin Punter	(Basketball Federation of Serbia) Partizan NIS	
(France) Mouhammadou Jaiteh	(Italian Basketball Federation) Virtus Segafredo Bologna	(United States) Caleb Homesley	(German Basketball Federation) Hamburg Towers	
(United States) Derek Needham	(Turkish Basketball Federation) Frutti Extra Bursaspor	(United States) Semaj Christon	(German Basketball Federation) ratiopharm Ulm	
(Serbia) Miloš Teodosić	(Italian Basketball Federation) Virtus Segafredo Bologna	(Slovenia) Jaka Blažič	(Basketball Federation of Slovenia) Cedevita Olimpija	

=== Coach of the Year ===
Coach	Team	Ref.
(Basketball Federation of Serbia) Dušan Alimpijević	(Turkish Basketball Federation) Frutti Extra Bursaspor	

=== Rising Star ===
Player	Team	Ref.
(Senegal) Khalifa Diop	(Spanish Basketball Federation) Gran Canaria	

=== MVP of the Round ===
==== Regular season ====
Round	Player	Team	PIR	Ref.
1	(United States) Johnathan Motley	(Russian Basketball Federation) Lokomotiv Kuban	39	
2	(United States) John Shurna	(Spanish Basketball Federation) Gran Canaria	26	
3	(United States) Johnathan Motley (2)	(Russian Basketball Federation) Lokomotiv Kuban	38	
4	(United States) Jaron Blossomgame	(German Basketball Federation) ratiopharm Ulm	35	
5	(Montenegro) Justin Cobbs	(Basketball Federation of Montenegro) Budućnost VOLI	44	
6	(United States) Errick McCollum	(Russian Basketball Federation) Lokomotiv Kuban	39	
7	(Brazil) Cristiano Felício	(German Basketball Federation) ratiopharm Ulm	26	
7	(United States) Sindarius Thornwell	(German Basketball Federation) ratiopharm Ulm	26	
8	(United States) Errick McCollum (2)	(Russian Basketball Federation) Lokomotiv Kuban	37	
9	(United States) Caleb Homesley	(German Basketball Federation) Hamburg Towers	45	
10	(United States) Errick McCollum (3)	(Russian Basketball Federation) Lokomotiv Kuban	33	
11	(United States) Anthony Clemmons	(Turkish Basketball Federation) Türk Telekom	32	
12	(United States) Jaylon Brown	(German Basketball Federation) Hamburg Towers	34	
13	(France) Mathias Lessort	(Basketball Federation of Serbia) Partizan NIS	32	
14	(France) Mouhammadou Jaiteh	(Italian Basketball Federation) Virtus Segafredo Bologna	41	
15	(Germany) Lukas Meisner	(German Basketball Federation) Hamburg Towers	29	
16	(United States) Semaj Christon	(German Basketball Federation) ratiopharm Ulm	31	
17	(Central African Republic) Kevarrius Hayes	(Turkish Basketball Federation) Frutti Extra Bursaspor	37	
18	(United States) Zach LeDay	(Basketball Federation of Serbia) Partizan NIS	30	

==== Playoffs ====
Round	Player	Team	PIR	Ref.
Eighthfinals	(United States) Andrew Andrews	(Turkish Basketball Federation) Frutti Extra Bursaspor	35	
Quarterfinals	(France) Mouhammadou Jaiteh (2)	(Italian Basketball Federation) Virtus Segafredo Bologna	38	
Semifinals	(Central African Republic) Kevarrius Hayes (2)	(Turkish Basketball Federation) Frutti Extra Bursaspor	27	

== Attendances to arenas ==
=== Average attendances ===
Pos	Team	Total	High	Low	Average
1	(Basketball Federation of Serbia) Partizan NIS	62,852	19,224	4,776	6,984
2	(Turkish Basketball Federation) Frutti Extra Bursaspor	36,554	6,743	1,570	4,062
3	(Spanish Basketball Federation) Valencia Basket	45,960	7,224	1,896	3,830
4	(Turkish Basketball Federation) Türk Telekom	34,130	5,107	1,759	3,792
5	(Basketball Federation of Slovenia) Cedevita Olimpija	36,378	12,500	710	3,307
6	(Italian Basketball Federation) Virtus Segafredo Bologna	35,920	10,000	0	2,993
7	(Spanish Basketball Federation) Joventut	29,035	6,623	1,963	2,904
8	(Polish Basketball Federation) Śląsk Wrocław	23,132	4,789	1,327	2,570
9	(French Federation of Basketball) Mincidelice JL Bourg	20,716	2,817	1,830	2,302
10	(Spanish Basketball Federation) Gran Canaria	24,053	3,656	1,551	2,187
11	(French Federation of Basketball) Metropolitans 92	18,061	2,478	1,196	1,806
12	(Spanish Basketball Federation) MoraBanc Andorra	16,657	4,456	823	1,514
13	(Lithuanian Basketball Federation) Lietkabelis	12,187	2,564	886	1,354
14	(Italian Basketball Federation) Umana Reyer Venezia	11,942	2,105	0	1,327
15	(German Basketball Federation) ratiopharm Ulm	11,154	2,501	0	1,239
16	(Basketball Federation of Montenegro) Budućnost VOLI	8,632	1,708	0	959
17	(Italian Basketball Federation) Dolomiti Energia Trento	7,602	1,287	725	950
18	(German Basketball Federation) Hamburg Towers	7,209	1,663	124	801
19	(Hellenic Basketball Federation) Promitheas	6,219	937	367	691
20	(Russian Basketball Federation) Lokomotiv Kuban	2,727	1,170	0	545
	League total	451,120	19,224	0	2,387

Source: EuroCup

== See also ==
- 2021–22 EuroLeague
- 2021–22 Basketball Champions League
- 2021–22 FIBA Europe Cup
