= Mouhammadou Jaiteh =

French basketball player (born 1994)

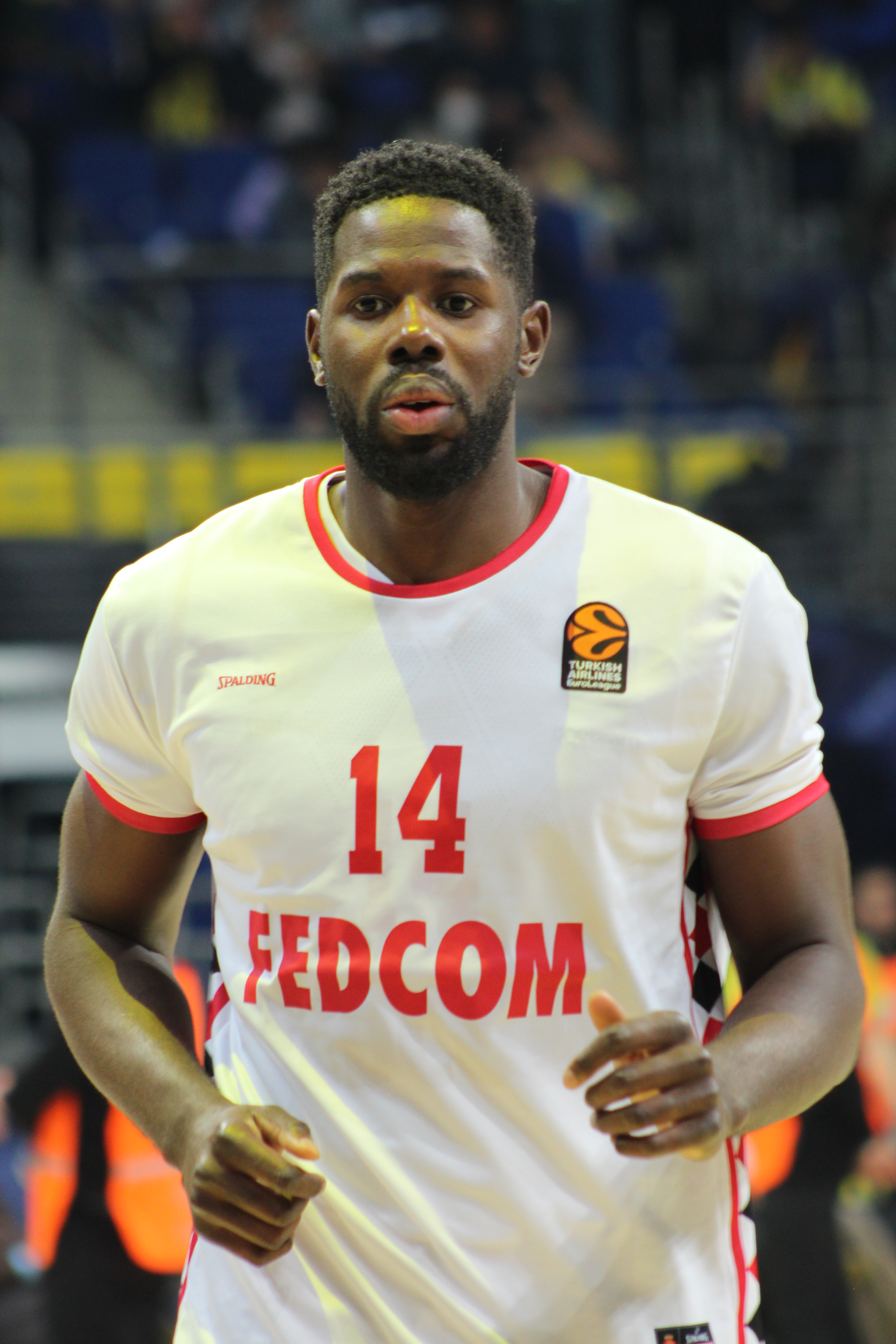
- Jaiteh with Monaco in 2024

No. 14 – Dubai Basketball
- Position: Center
- League: ABA League; EuroLeague

Personal information
- Born: 27 November 1994 (age 31) Pantin, France
- Listed height: 2.11 m (6 ft 11 in)
- Listed weight: 112 kg (247 lb)

Career information
- NBA draft: 2015: undrafted
- Playing career: 2010–present

Career history
- 2010–2012: INSEP
- 2012–2013: SOMB
- 2013–2016: Nanterre 92
- 2016–2017: Strasbourg
- 2017–2018: Limoges
- 2018–2019: Auxilium Torino
- 2019–2020: Avtodor Saratov
- 2020–2021: Gaziantep
- 2021–2023: Virtus Bologna
- 2023–2025: AS Monaco
- 2025–present: Dubai Basketball

Career highlights
- EuroCup champion (2022); EuroCup MVP (2022); All-EuroCup First Team (2022); Turkish Super League rebounding leader (2021); 2x Italian Supercup winner (2021, 2022); FIBA EuroChallenge champion (2015); LNB Pro A champion (2024); 3× French LNB All-Star (2013, 2015, 2016); French 2nd Division French Player's MVP (2013); French 2nd Division Most Improved Player (2013)
Medals
Men's basketball
Representing France
EuroBasket
Bronze medal – third place	2015 France–Croatia–Germany–Latvia

Mouhammadou Einstein Jaiteh (born 27 November 1994), commonly known as Mam Jaiteh, is a French professional basketball player for Dubai Basketball of the ABA League and EuroLeague. He is of Senegalese and Gambian descent.

== Early life and career ==
In his youth, Jaiteh originally played soccer with friends, before beginning his basketball career at 13. After playing for INSEP for a few years, Jaiteh would participate in the 2010 FIBA Europe Under-16 Championship, and then the FIBA Europe Under-18 Championships in 2011 and 2012. The 2012 championship had Jaiteh leading all competitors in rebounds per game.

== Professional career ==
After being recruited by the Connecticut Huskies, Washington Huskies, Gonzaga Bulldogs, and Virginia Tech Hokies, Jaiteh decided to sign a two-year contract to play with the Stade Olympique Maritime Boulonnais of the LNB Pro B (French 2nd Division), where he would get more playing time. During that period, Jaiteh was considered as a finalist for France's Pro B MVP award, due to his performance of averaging 16.2 points and 9.9 rebounds per game, in 27.6 minutes of play per game. On May 3, 2013, Jaiteh ended up being declared the winner of the 2013 LNB Pro B French Player's MVP award, as well as the winner of the LNB Pro B Most Improved Player award.

In 2013, Jaiteh was selected to participate in the Nike Hoop Summit. During the competition, he would score 6 points and grab 9 rebounds, to help the World Team win the competition. Two days after performing in the competition on April 20, Jaiteh decided to officially declare for the 2013 NBA draft. He was projected to go between the late first round and the second round of the draft, but Jaiteh wanted to be convinced that he would be drafted in the first round by somebody. Ultimately, Jaiteh ended up withdrawing from the draft, because of that issue, and he ended up withdrawing alongside fellow Frenchmen Louis Labeyrie and Axel Toupane.

On July 28, 2013, Jaiteh signed a contract with the French team JSF Nanterre. Jaiteh would officially declare for the 2015 NBA draft, in April 2015, after trying to gain earlier recognition as a prospect in the 2014 NBA draft. A few weeks before the 2015 NBA draft took place, Nanterre would win the 2014–15 EuroChallenge championship, with Jaiteh helping the team by grabbing 7 timely rebounds in a close, buzzer-beating 64–63 victory over Trabzonspor Medical Park. As an early entrant in the 2015 NBA draft, he went undrafted.

On July 28, 2016, Jaiteh signed with SIG Strasbourg.

On November 8, 2018, Jaiteh signed a deal with Auxilium Torino.

On July 29, 2019, he signed with Avtodor Saratov of the VTB United League.

On June 30, 2020, he signed with Gaziantep Basketbol of the Turkish Basketbol Süper Ligi (BSL). During the season he was with the team, Jaiteh was the Basketbol Süper Ligi's leading rebounder for that season.

=== Virtus Bologna (2021–2023) ===
On July 20, 2021, he signed a two-year deal with Virtus Bologna of the Italian Lega Basket Serie A (LBA). On September 21, the team won its second Supercup, defeating Olimpia Milano 90–84. Moreover, after having ousted Lietkabelis, Ulm and Valencia in the first three rounds of the playoffs, on 11 May 2022, Virtus defeated Frutti Extra Bursaspor by 80–67 at the Segafredo Arena, winning its first EuroCup and qualifying for the EuroLeague after 14 years. However, despite having ended the regular season at the first place and having ousted 3–0 both Pesaro and Tortona in the first two rounds of playoffs, Virtus was defeated 4–2 in the national finals by Olimpia Milano.

On 29 September 2022, after having ousted Milano in the semifinals, Virtus won its third Supercup, defeating 72–69 Banco di Sardegna Sassari and achieving a back-to-back, following the 2021 trophy. However, Jaiteh did not play in that game due to an injury. However, despite good premises Virtus ended the EuroLeague season at the 14th place, thus it did not qualify for the playoffs. Moreover, the team was defeated in the Italian Basketball Cup final by Brescia. In June, after having ousted 3–0 both Brindisi and Tortona, Virtus was defeated 4–3 by Olimpia Milan in the national finals, following a series which was widely regarded among the best in the latest years of Italian basketball.

=== Dubai Basketball (2025–present) ===
On July 14, 2025, he signed with Dubai Basketball of the ABA League.

== Personal life ==
Jaiteh's father descended from Senegal, while his mother descended from the Gambia. Although he is of both Senegalese and Gambian descent, he does not officially hold any Senegalese or Gambian nationality.

== Career statistics ==
Legend
GP	Games played	GS	Games started	MPG	Minutes per game
FG%	Field-goal percentage	3P%	3-point field-goal percentage	FT%	Free-throw percentage
RPG	Rebounds per game	APG	Assists per game	SPG	Steals per game
BPG	Blocks per game	PPG	Points per game	PIR	Performance index rating
**Bold**	Career high

=== EuroLeague ===
Year	Team	GP	GS	MPG	FG%	3P%	FT%	RPG	APG	SPG	BPG	PPG	PIR
2013–14	Nanterre	10	0	12.6	.559	.000	**.727**	3.7	.3	.4	**.4**	4.6	6.1
2022–23	Virtus Bologna	**33**	**32**	**18.6**	**.591**	—	.565	**4.7**	**.7**	**.6**	.2	**8.4**	**9.6**
2023–24	Monaco	25	7	8.2	.587	—	.450	2.2	.2	.2	.1	3.3	3.8
Career		68	39	13.9	.586	.000	.560	3.6	.5	.4	.2	6.0	7.0

=== EuroCup ===
Year	Team	GP	GS	MPG	FG%	3P%	FT%	RPG	APG	SPG	BPG	PPG	PIR
2013–14	Nanterre	8	0	17.0	.455	—	.667	3.8	.4	.6	1.0	3.5	4.3
2015–16	Nanterre	10	9	**26.9**	.619	—	.621	6.8	1.1	**.7**	**1.1**	12.2	15.9
2017–18	Limoges CSP	14	11	23.2	.548	—	.587	6.0	1.3	.6	.9	9.2	11.4
2018–19	Limoges CSP	4	2	15.3	.600	—	**.833**	4.8	**1.5**	.3	.3	4.3	6.3
2021–22	Virtus Bologna	**21**	**17**	22.0	**.691**	—	.569	**7.6**	1.0	.5	.7	**12.8**	**17.8**
Career		57	39	22.0	.623	—	.600	6.3	1.0	.6	.8	9.9	13.2

=== Basketball Champions League ===
Year	Team	GP	GS	MPG	FG%	3P%	FT%	RPG	APG	SPG	BPG	PPG
2016–17	SIG Strasbourg	16	13	21.7	.516	—	.643	5.7	1.4	.7	.6	7.6
Career		16	13	21.7	.516	—	.643	5.7	1.4	.7	.6	7.6

=== FIBA EuroChallenge ===
Year	Team	GP	GS	MPG	FG%	3P%	FT%	RPG	APG	SPG	BPG	PPG
2014–15	Nanterre	16	16	18.9	.612	—	.577	5.5	.5	.4	.5	8.8
Career		16	16	18.9	.612	—	.577	5.5	.5	.4	.5	8.8

=== Domestic leagues ===
Year	Team	League	GP	MPG	FG%	3P%	FT%	RPG	APG	SPG	BPG	PPG
2010–11	(France) INSEP	NM1	30	17.3	.382	.500	.523	5.6	.3	.4	.3	4.5
2011–12	(France) INSEP	NM1	28	30.1	.549	.250	.695	10.3	1.1	1.0	.9	14.7
2012–13	(France) SOMB	Pro B	30	27.8	.635	.000	.676	9.7	.9	.9	.9	16.2
2013–14	(France) JSF Nanterre	Pro A	30	16.7	.500	.500	.638	4.3	.6	.5	.6	6.7
2014–15	(France) JSF Nanterre	Pro A	34	22.5	.599	—	.586	6.5	.7	.6	.5	11.3
2015–16	(France) JSF Nanterre	Pro A	36	25.6	.550	.000	.667	8.0	1.0	.8	.8	12.7
2016–17	(France) SIG Strasbourg	Pro A	47	19.4	.527	.000	.595	5.1	1.3	.3	.6	8.9
2017–18	(France) Limoges CSP	Pro A	38	22.2	.523	.000	.585	6.1	1.3	.7	.6	9.3
2018–19	(France) Limoges CSP	LNB Élite	6	17.5	.515	.000	.833	4.5	.7	.5	—	6.5
2018–19	(Italy) Auxilium Torino	LBA	25	20.2	.678	.000	.500	7.0	1.1	.5	.4	10.9
2019–20	(Russia) Avtodor Saratov	VTBUL	18	29.1	.660	—	.560	9.9	1.2	.8	.9	13.4
2020–21	(Turkey) Gaziantep	TBSL	30	30.8	.638	.667	.514	10.8	2.1	.7	.9	16.7
2021–22	(Italy) Virtus Bologna	LBA	38	21.4	.662	.000	.571	7.2	.6	.4	.4	11.5
2022–23	(Italy) Virtus Bologna	LBA	35	18.2	.633	—	.484	6.0	.6	.3	.6	7.9
2023–24	(France) Monaco	LNB Élite	31	14.9	.592	—	.553	4.0	.5	.4	.5	6.8

== Honours ==
- French 2nd Division French Player's MVP (1): 2013
- French 2nd Division Most Improved Player (1): 2013
- French LNB All-Star Game (3): 2013 (Pro B), 2015 (Pro A), 2016 (Pro A)
- FIBA EuroChallenge Champion (1): 2015
