= Kerem Kanter =

Turkish basketball player (born 1995)

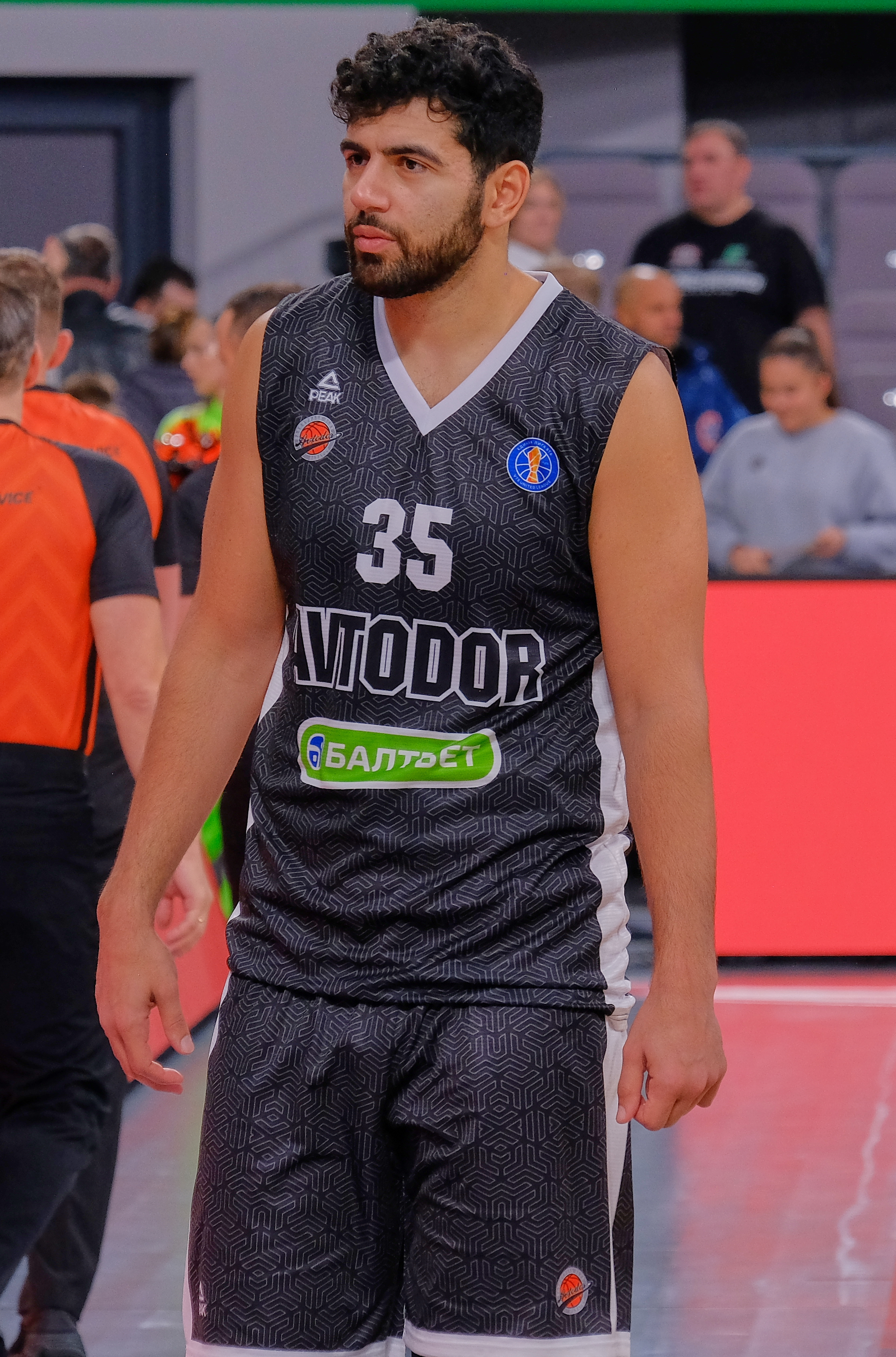
- Kanter with the BC Avtodor (2024)

No. 31 – Seoul Samsung Thunders
- Position: Power forward / center
- League: KBL

Personal information
- Born: 29 April 1995 (age 31) Bursa, Turkey
- Listed height: 2.08 m (6 ft 10 in)
- Listed weight: 109 kg (240 lb)

Career information
- High school: Wilbraham & Monson (Wilbraham, Massachusetts); IMG Academy (Bradenton, Florida)
- College: Green Bay (2014–2017); Xavier (2017–2018)
- NBA draft: 2018: undrafted
- Playing career: 2018–present

Career history
- 2018: JL Bourg
- 2019: BC Dzūkija
- 2019–2020: Joventut Badalona
- 2020–2021: Kolossos Rodou
- 2021–2022: Śląsk Wrocław
- 2022–2023: Akita Northern Happinets
- 2024: Blois
- 2024–2025: Avtodor
- 2025–present: Seoul Samsung Thunders

Career highlights
- EuroCup rebounding leader (2022); LKL Top Scorer (2019); Polish League (2022); Greek League Top Scorer (2021); Greek League rebounding leader (2021)
Medals
Men's basketball
Representing Turkey
European U-18 Championship
Gold medal – first place	2013 Latvia	Team

Kerem Kanter (born 29 April 1995) is a Turkish professional basketball player for the Seoul Samsung Thunders of the Korean Basketball League. He played college basketball for Wisconsin–Green Bay and the Xavier Musketeers. Kanter is the younger brother of NBA player Enes Freedom.

== Early life ==
Kanter played one season at IMG Academy and averaged 15 points and 9 rebounds per game. Despite receiving major college attention, he took a long time to decide whether to go to college or play in a professional league. When he finally opted for college, most rosters were filled and Wisconsin–Green Bay was one of the only schools that could take him.

== College career ==
As a freshman at Green Bay, Kanter played alongside Keifer Sykes. Kanter averaged 4.0 points and 2.3 rebounds off the bench as a sophomore. He helped the Phoenix to their first NCAA Tournament berth in 20 years, earning a 14 seed. As a junior, he posted 15.3 points and 6.3 rebounds per game. After the season, he declared for the NBA draft, but opted out before the deadline. Kanter decided to transfer to Xavier University under the NCAA's graduate transfer rule. In his graduate year, Kanter averaged 10.9 points and 4.5 rebounds per game. He helped the Musketeers to a 29–6 season, its first Big East regular-season title and a 1 seed in the NCAA Tournament. Kanter scored 24 points and grabbed five rebounds in the first round win versus Texas Southern.

== Professional career ==
After going undrafted in the 2018 NBA draft, Kanter signed with JL Bourg Basket of the French league on 6 August 2018. He averaged 7.2 points per game. On 22 January 2019, Kanter signed with BC Dzūkija.

In July 2019, Kanter signed with Club Joventut Badalona. In November, he refused to travel to Turkey to play against Darussafaka due to fears of being arrested. Kanter averaged 6.8 points and 3.8 rebounds per game. He was released from the team on 6 July 2020.

On 4 September 2020, Kanter officially signed with Kolossos Rodou of the Greek Basket League.

On 24 August 2021, he has signed with Śląsk Wrocław of the PLK.

On June 11, 2022, he has signed with Akita Northern Happinets of the Japanese B.League.

== National team career ==
Kanter competed on the Turkish U-18 national team in 2013, helping lead the team to a gold medal at the FIBA Europe U-18 Championship in Latvia.
