= Khalifa Diop =

Senegalese basketball player (born 2002)

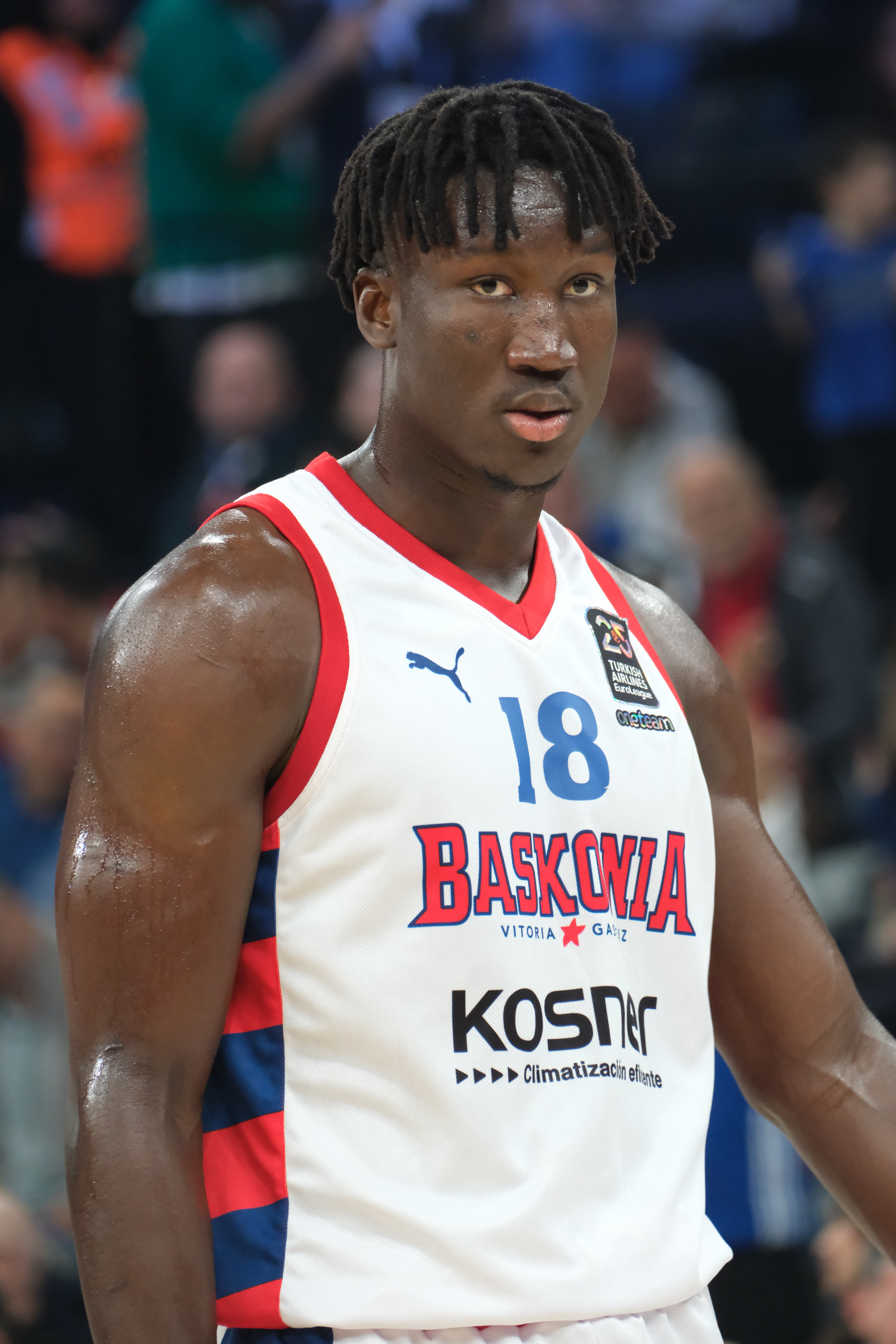
- Diop with Baskonia in 2025

No. 18 – Cleveland Cavaliers
- Position: Center
- League: NBA

Personal information
- Born: 15 January 2002 (age 24) Guediawaye, Senegal
- Listed height: 6 ft 10 in (2.08 m)
- Listed weight: 231 lb (105 kg)

Career information
- NBA draft: 2022: 2nd round, 39th overall pick
- Drafted by: Cleveland Cavaliers
- Playing career: 2017–present

Career history
- 2017–2023: Gran Canaria
- 2017–2021: →Gran Canaria B
- 2023–2026: Baskonia
- 2026–present: Cleveland Cavaliers

Career highlights
- EuroCup champion (2023); EuroCup Rising Star (2022); 2× ACB All-Young Players Team (2022, 2023)
- Stats at NBA.com
- Stats at Basketball Reference
Medals
Men's basketball
Representing Senegal
FIBA U18 African Championship
Silver medal – second place	2020 Egypt	Team

Khalifa Ababacar Diop (born 15 January 2002) is a Senegalese professional basketball player for the Cleveland Cavaliers of the National Basketball Association (NBA). He also plays for the Senegalese national team. Diop was drafted 39th overall by the Cavaliers in the 2022 NBA draft.

== Early career ==
Diop trained with the junior teams of CB Gran Canaria and CB TerrAlfas. In 2018, he was named the MVP of the national junior club championship. He debuted with Gran Canaria B in the Liga EBA, the Spanish fourth level league, at age 15. On 3 November 2019, Diop recorded 25 points and a league record 28 rebounds in a Liga EBA game against Novum Energy Lyceum.

== Professional career ==
=== Gran Canaria (2017–2023) ===
On 28 March 2019, Diop made his senior debut for Gran Canaria, recording three points and four rebounds in a 90–55 loss to Maccabi Tel Aviv in the EuroLeague. On 24 November 2019, he made his Liga ACB debut, playing three minutes in a loss to Real Madrid. Diop was named EuroCup Rising Star and made the ACB All-Young Players Team for the 2021–22 season.

After declaring for the 2022 NBA draft, Diop was drafted 39th overall by the Cleveland Cavaliers. Cavaliers President Koby Altman announced a few days later that Diop would not join the Cavaliers roster in the 2022-23 NBA season, and would stay in the Spanish League. Diop later signed a contract extension with Gran Canaria.

=== Baskonia (2023–2026) ===
On July 14, 2023, Diop signed a multi-year contract with EuroLeague mainstays Baskonia.

=== Cleveland Cavaliers (2026–present) ===
On September 2, 2026, the Cleveland Cavaliers announced that they signed Diop to a contract.

== National team career ==
Diop represented Senegal at the 2019 FIBA Under-19 World Cup in Heraklion. He averaged 13.1 points, seven rebounds and 1.4 assists per game. Diop helped Senegal win the silver medal at the 2020 FIBA U18 African Championship in Egypt, where he averaged 12.6 points, 11.8 rebounds, 3.4 assists and 3.4 steals per game. At the 2021 FIBA Under-19 Basketball World Cup in Latvia, he averaged 14 points, 9.4 rebounds and 2.1 assists per game.

In February 2022, Diop was selected for the Senegal senior national team for the qualifiers of the 2023 FIBA Basketball World Cup.

== Career statistics ==
Legend
GP	Games played	GS	Games started	MPG	Minutes per game
FG%	Field-goal percentage	3P%	3-point field-goal percentage	FT%	Free-throw percentage
RPG	Rebounds per game	APG	Assists per game	SPG	Steals per game
BPG	Blocks per game	PPG	Points per game	PIR	Performance index rating
**Bold**	Career high

=== EuroLeague ===
Year	Team	GP	GS	MPG	FG%	3P%	FT%	RPG	APG	SPG	BPG	PPG	PIR
2018–19	Gran Canaria	1	0	7.0	.500	—	.500	**4.0**	—	**1.0**	—	**3.0**	**7.0**
2023–24	Baskonia	**13**	**1**	**9.4**	**.520**	—	**.625**	1.9	**.3**	.2	**.2**	2.8	2.6
Career		14	1	9.3	.519	—	.611	2.1	.3	.3	.1	2.8	2.9

=== EuroCup ===
Year	Team	GP	GS	MPG	FG%	3P%	FT%	RPG	APG	SPG	BPG	PPG	PIR
2020–21	Gran Canaria	14	3	7.6	.636	—	.500	1.6	.4	**.6**	.3	2.5	2.9
2021–22	Gran Canaria	20	4	15.5	.582	—	.537	3.9	**1.0**	.4	.8	5.7	7.5
2022–23	Gran Canaria	**22**	**6**	**19.0**	**.657**	—	**.597**	**4.9**	.6	**.6**	**1.1**	**8.2**	**10.6**
Career		56	13	14.9	.626	—	.567	3.7	.7	.5	.8	5.9	7.6

=== Domestic leagues ===
Year	Team	League	GP	MPG	FG%	3P%	FT%	RPG	APG	SPG	BPG	PPG
2019–20	(Spain) Gran Canaria B	LEB Plata	17	18.2	.556	—	.419	7.3	.9	.5	.5	9.8
2019–20	(Spain) Gran Canaria	ACB	5	3.0	.167	—	.333	.8	—	.2	.2	0.8
2020–21	(Spain) Gran Canaria B	LEB Plata	4	24.8	.571	.000	.600	9.5	1.0	.5	1.2	11.5
2020–21	(Spain) Gran Canaria	ACB	28	9.1	.525	.000	.512	2.2	.2	.3	.5	3.1
2021–22	(Spain) Gran Canaria	ACB	34	16.3	.641	—	.580	4.3	.5	.5	.6	7.0
2022–23	(Spain) Gran Canaria	ACB	36	20.0	.572	.000	.597	5.0	.6	.5	.9	7.6
2023–24	(Spain) Baskonia	ACB	12	9.3	.484	—	.714	2.7	.2	.3	.2	3.3
