= Dave Dudzinski =

American basketball player (born 1992)

David Dudzinski
No. 23 – Saga Ballooners
- Position: Power forward
- League: B.League

Personal information
- Born: May 26, 1992 (age 34) Maple Park, IL, U.S.
- Listed height: 6 ft 9 in (2.06 m)
- Listed weight: 226 lb (103 kg)

Career information
- High school: Kaneland High School
- College: College of the Holy Cross (2010–2014)
- NBA draft: 2014: undrafted
- Playing career: 2014–present

Career history
- 2014–2015: Fortitudo Agrigento
- 2015–2016: BC Šiauliai
- 2016–2017: Steaua CSM Eximbank Bucuresti
- 2017–2021: Antwerp Giants
- 2021–2023: Bursaspor Basketbol
- 2023–2025: San-en NeoPhoenix
- 2025-present: Saga Ballooners

Career highlights
- Patriot League All-Rookie Team (2011); All-Patriot League Second Team (2013); All-Patriot League First Team (2014); Patriot League All-Tournament Team (2014)

David Dudzinski (born May 26, 1992) is an American professional basketball player for the Saga Ballooners. He played college basketball for College of the Holy Cross.

== Early life ==
Dudzinski played high school basketball at Kaneland High School. He twice earned First Team All-Western Sun Conference honors and was selected All-Area by both the Daily Herland and the Kane County Chronicle. He played AAU basketball for Velocity Black.

== College career ==
In November 2009, he signed a National Letter of Intent to play for College of the Holy Cross.

In February 2011, he was chosen to the All-Patriot League All-Rookie team after averaging 4.3 points and 2.7 rebounds per game during the 2010–2011 season. On December 25, 2011, he was named the AT&T Crusader of the Week. He had 20 points and 6 rebounds, hitting the 20-point mark for the third time that season.

On June 26, 2012, he earned a spot on the 2011–2012 Patriot League Academic Honor Roll for the first time. On December 26, 2012, he was named the Patriot League Player of the Week. This was the first time he had won Patriot League Player of the Week honors. He averaged 26.5 points, 4 rebounds and 2 blocked shots per game. On March 3, 2013, he was selected to the 2012–2013 All-Patriot League second team in men's basketball. He averaged a team best 15 points and 6.6 rebounds. He finished the regular season ranked fourth in the league in scoring, fourth in rebounding, fourth in free throw percentage, eight in blocked shots and ninth in field goal percentage.

On October 23, 2013, he was selected to the 2013–2014 preseason All-Patriot League team. On March 2, 2014, he was selected to the 2013–2014 All-Patriot League First Team. He averaged a team-best 15.3 points and 7.5 rebounds. He finished the season ranked first in the league in rebounding, third in scoring, 10th in blocked shots and 12th in free throw percentage. He ranked ninth all-time at Holy Cross in career blocked shots, 10th in games started and 20th in points scored. On March 11, 2014, he was selected to the 2013–2014 National Association of Basketball Coaches All-District 13 first team.

In May 2014, he was the recipient of the Richard J Maloney Award. This award is presented annually by the Holy Cross Varsity Club to the men's basketball player who best exemplifies Mr. Maloney's spirit and energy as a loyal contributor to the program.

In June 2014, he had a pre-draft workout with the Boston Celtics. He was one of six players at the Celtics' practice facility for the seventh workout ahead of the 2014 NBA Draft.

== Professional career ==
=== Fortitudo Agrigento (2014–2015) ===
In August 2014, he signed his first professional contract to play basketball with Fortitudo Agrigento.

=== Steaua CSM EximBank Bucuresti (2016–2017) ===
In June 2018, he signed his third one-year contract to play for Steaua CSM.

=== Telenet Giants Antwerp (2017–2021) ===
In March 2020, his season ended early due to the COVID-19 pandemic. He was team captain of the Antwerp Giants from 2019 to 2020. During his time with the team, they won the Belgian Basketball Cup for the first time in 12 years. The 2019–2020 season he became the first player in BCL history to record a game with 20 or more points and rebounds when he had 21 points and 22 rebounds.

=== Frutti Extra Bursapor (2021–2023) ===
On May 1, 2022, he was signed to a contract extension for the next two seasons. He was one of the leaders of the team that season scoring an average of 11.3 points per game.

On November 24, 2022, he earned Most Valuable Player after having a career-best performance that led his team to a road win. He had 30 points, 10 rebounds and 2 assists.

=== San-en NeoPhoenix (2023–2025) ===
In June 2023, he signed with San-en NeoPhoenix.

=== Saga Ballooners (2025-present) ===
On June 10, 2025, he joined the Saga Ballooners.

== Personal life ==
Dudzinski is the son of Barbara and David Dudzinski Sr. He has a brother and a sister. His father played football at Northwestern University and his mother swam at Northwestern University. His sister, Katy, played volleyball at Wichita State University.
