= Virtus Arena =

Indoor arena in Bologna, Italy

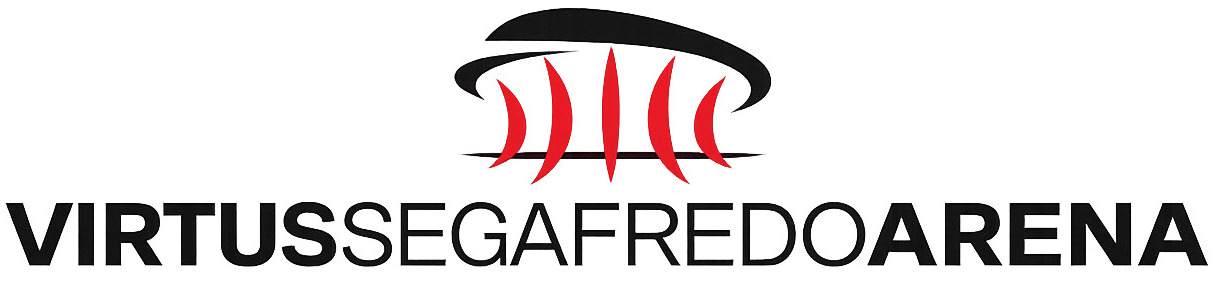

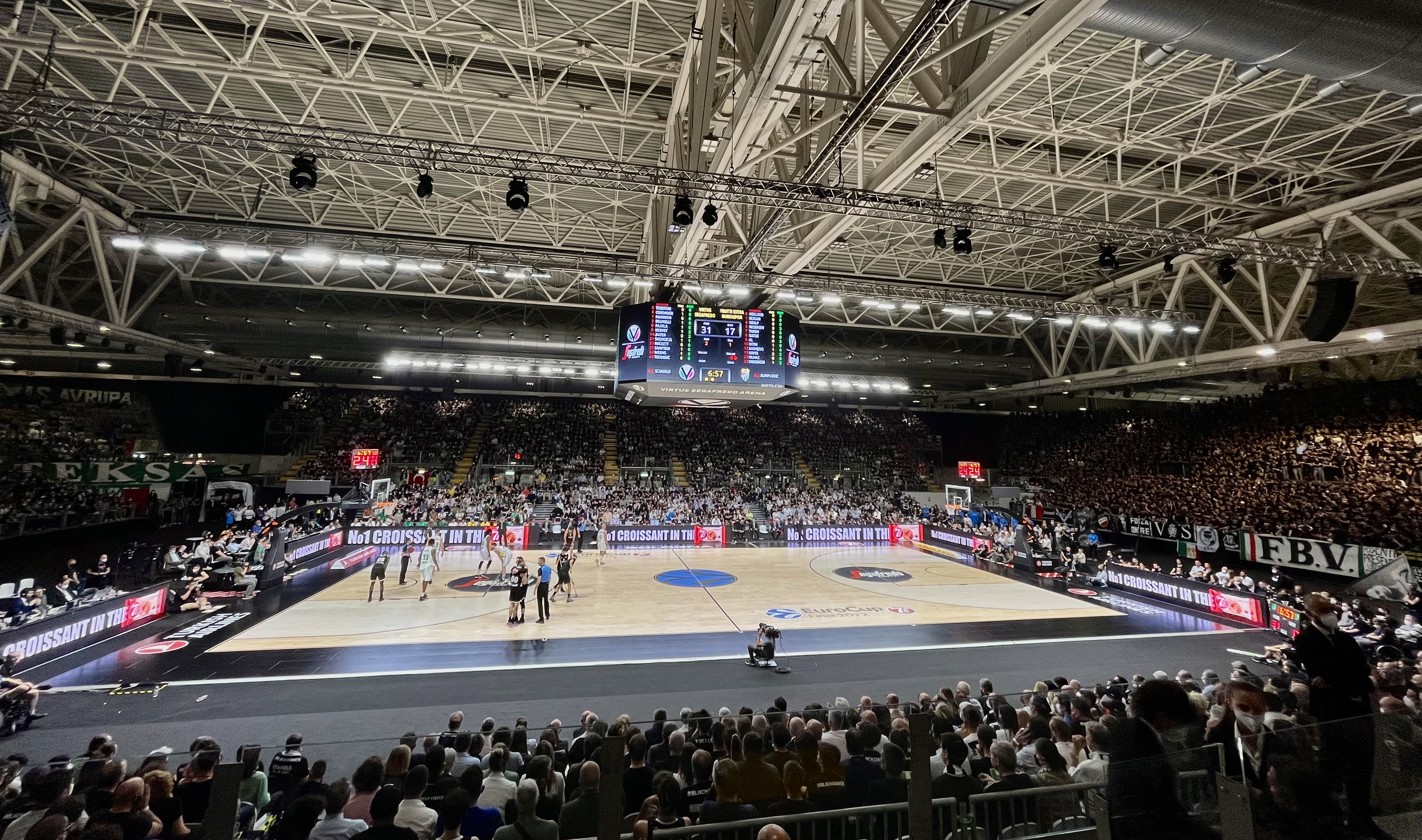
- Virtus Arena in May 2022
- Interactive map of Virtus Arena
- Location: Viale della Fiera, 40128, Bologna
- Coordinates: 44°30′39.16″N 11°21′58.12″E
- Owner: BolognaFiere; Virtus Bologna
- Capacity: Basketball: • 8,970 (2019–2020) • 9,700 (2020–2021) • 9,980 (2021–2025) • 10,500 (2025–2026)
- Surface: Parquet

Construction
- Built: 2019
- Opened: 10 November 2019
- Closed: 5 July 2026

Tenant
- Virtus Bologna (2019–2026)

Website
- www.virtus.it www.bolognafiere.it

Virtus Arena, known for sponsorship reasons as Segafredo Arena until 2025, was a temporary indoor arena located in Bologna, with a capacity of 10,500 seats, one of the largest of the country. The arena was opened in November 2019 and hosted the home games of Virtus Bologna. From November 2019 to June 2021, it was initially located in the "Padiglione 30", a fair pavilion within the Fiera District, but in November 2021, it was moved to "Padiglione 37".

== History ==
The arena was inaugurated on 10 November 2019, for the home game against Treviso Basket, won by Virtus 84–79. On 25 December, for the derby against Fortitudo Bologna, 9,166 fans attended the game, achieving a new record for Virtus in LBA.

In January 2020, the arena was dismantled and rebuilt in September, to host the Final Four of the 2020 Italian Basketball Supercup. Moreover, the arena became the official home court of Virtus for the 2020–21 season of LBA and EuroCup.

In April 2021, Massimo Zanetti, owner of Virtus and Segafredo, announced that the team will remain to the Segafredo Arena for at least three more seasons, with the hope of starting to build a new arena in 2022.

On 11 June 2021, at the Segafredo Arena, Virtus defeated its historic rival Olimpia Milano in the national finals, winning its 16th national title and the first one after twenty years.

In November 2021, the arena was moved to another fair pavilion with a capacity of 9,980 seats and was inaugurated on 17 November for a EuroCup match against Reyer Venezia. On 11 May 2022, the arena hosted the EuroCup Final between Virtus and Frutti Extra Bursaspor, won by Virtus 80–67. The game set a new record for the club with 718,279 euro of revenue and almost 10,000 attendance.

In late 2025, the arena was expanded to a capacity exceeding 10,000 seats. Following the renovation, the arena was selected as the host venue for the final stage of the Davis Cup, which took place in Bologna from 18 to 23 November. The venue was known as SuperTennis Arena for the Davis Cup Finals and Pavilion 36 was dedicated to a national teams village with training courts, gyms, restaurants and relaxation areas created for the event.

On 5 July 2026, the arena hosted the game between Italy and Lithuania. The match marked the final event held at the venue before the building of the Unipol Hall, a new arena which was scheduled to be completed in time for the start of the following basketball season.

== Gallery ==
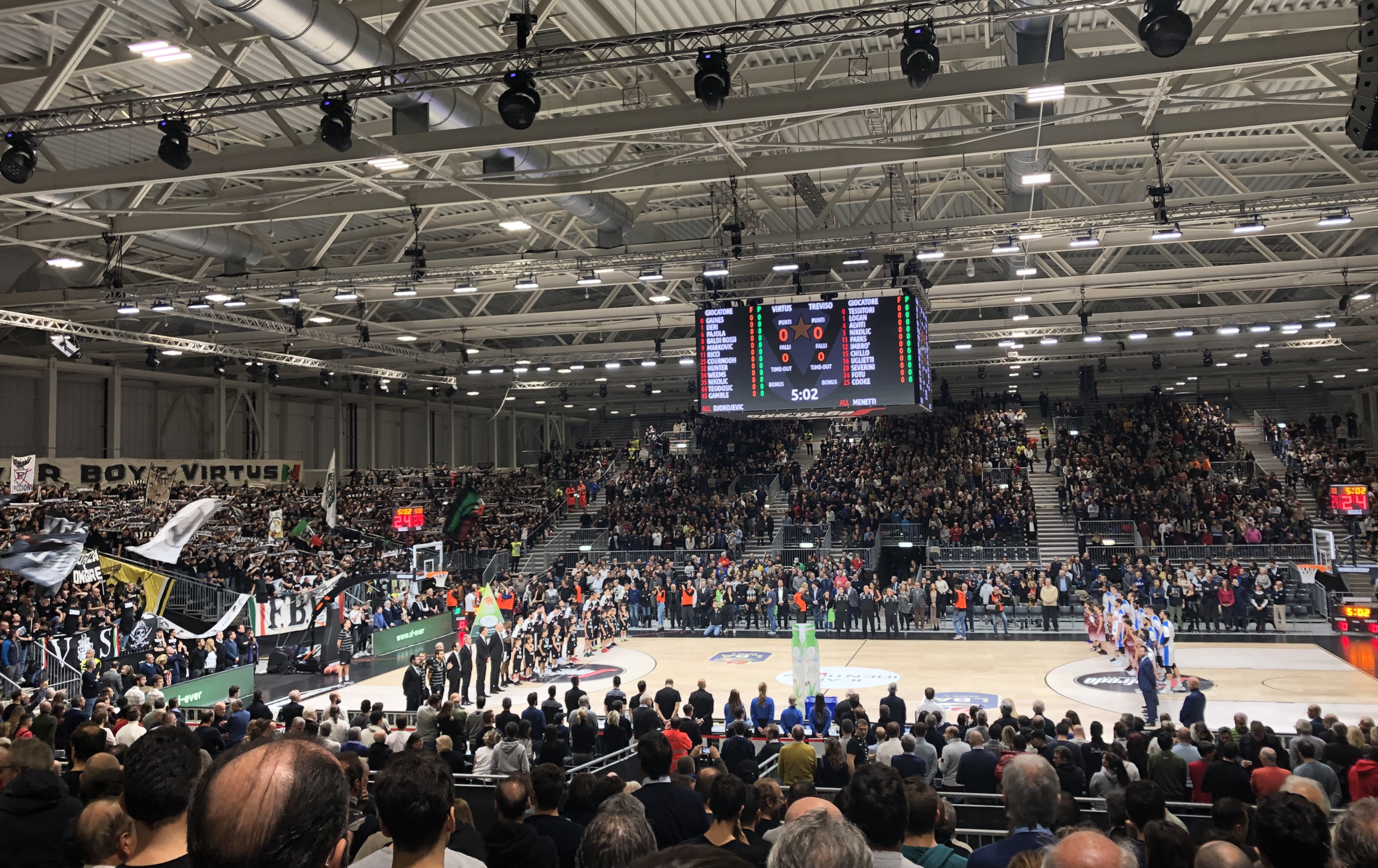
Segafredo Arena in November 2019

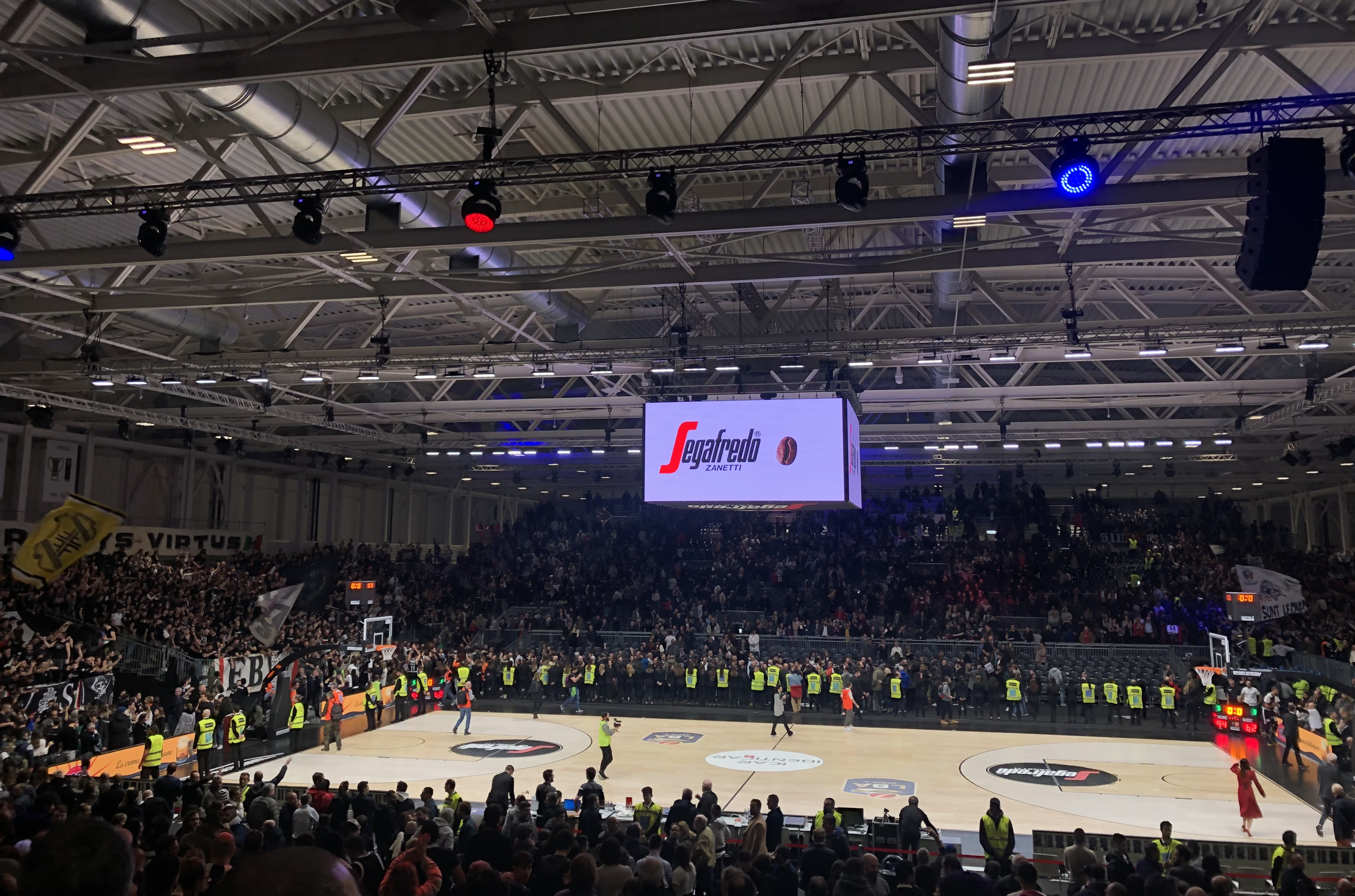
Segafredo Arena in December 2019

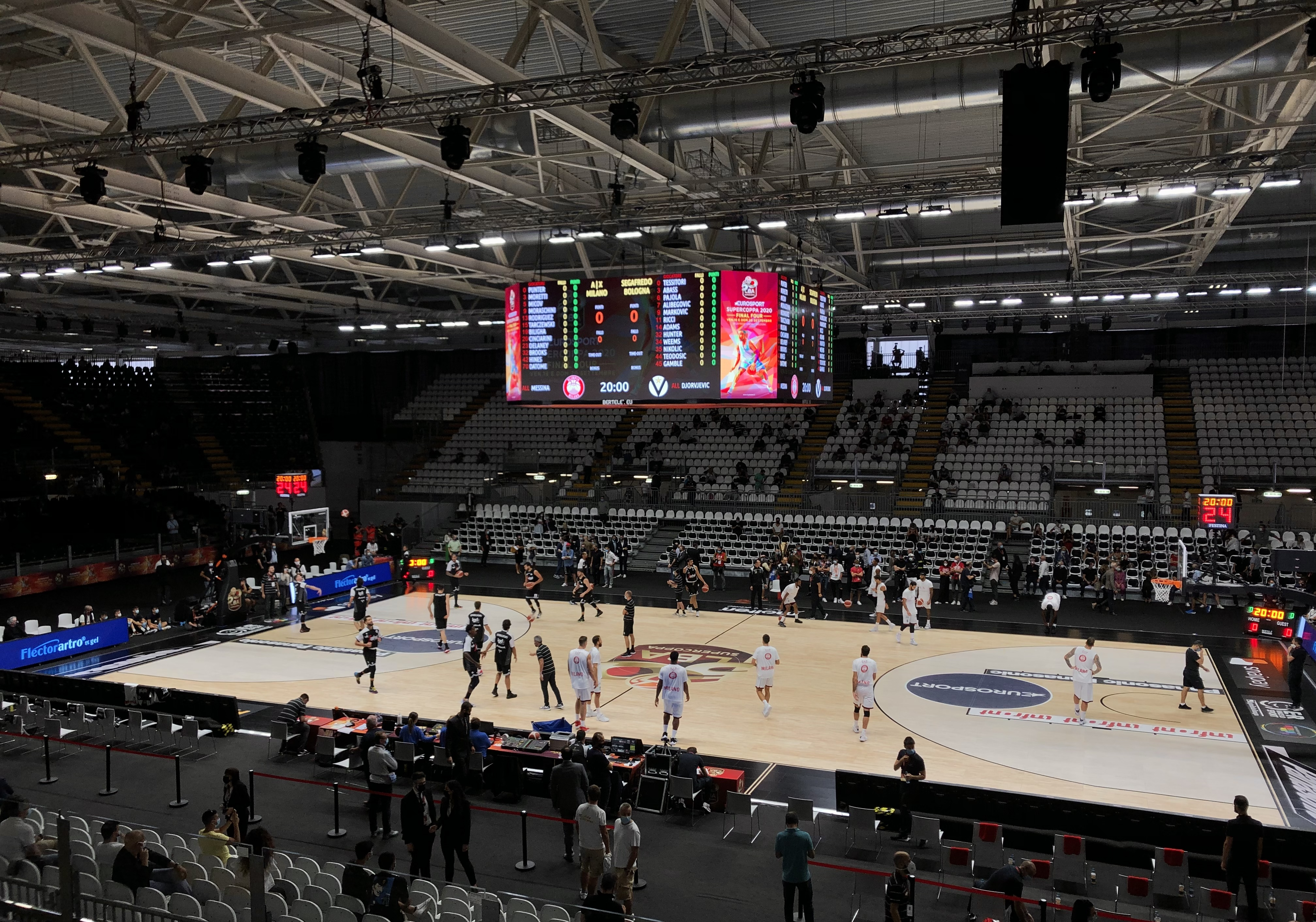
Segafredo Arena in September 2020

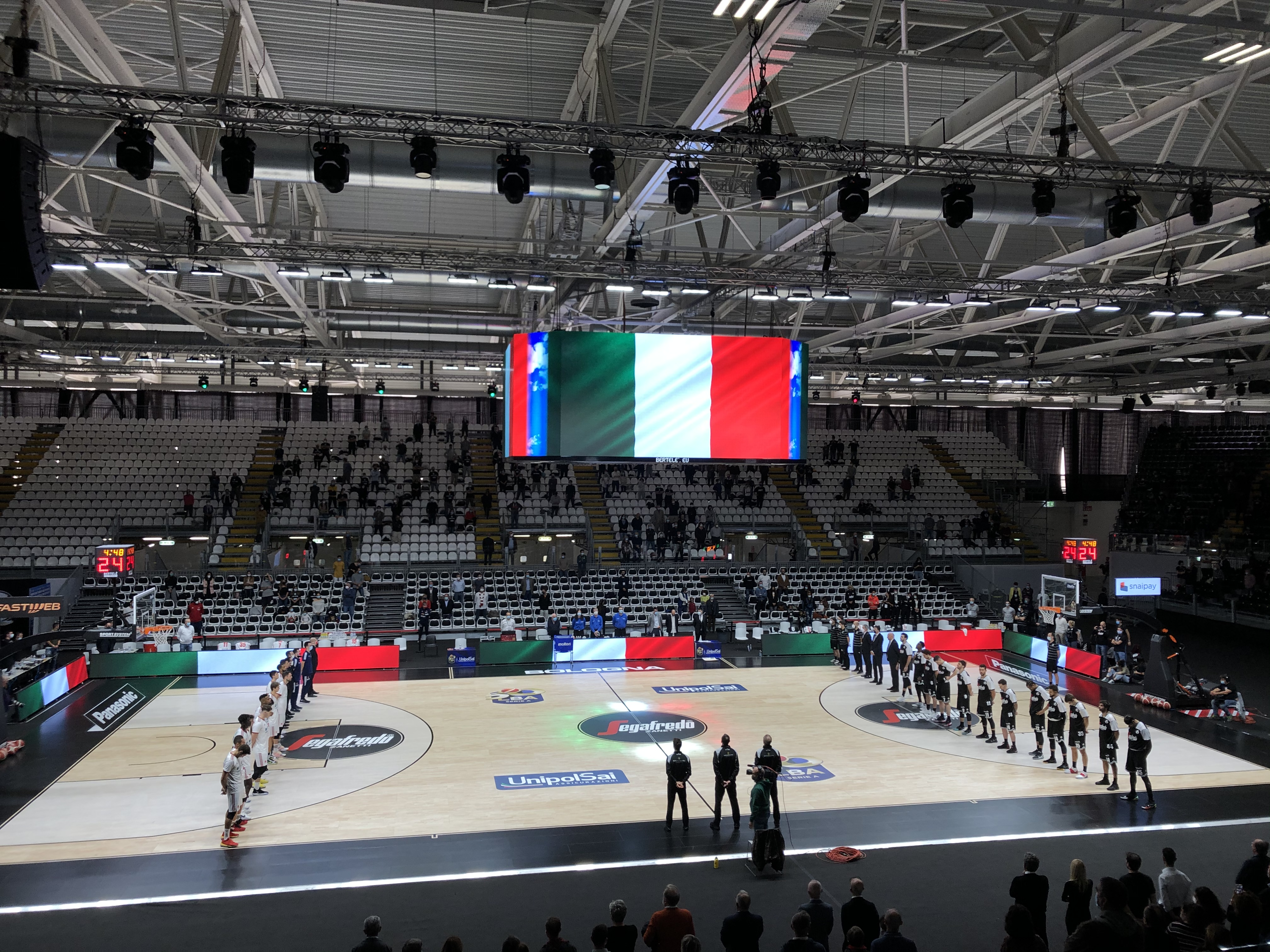
Segafredo Arena in October 2020

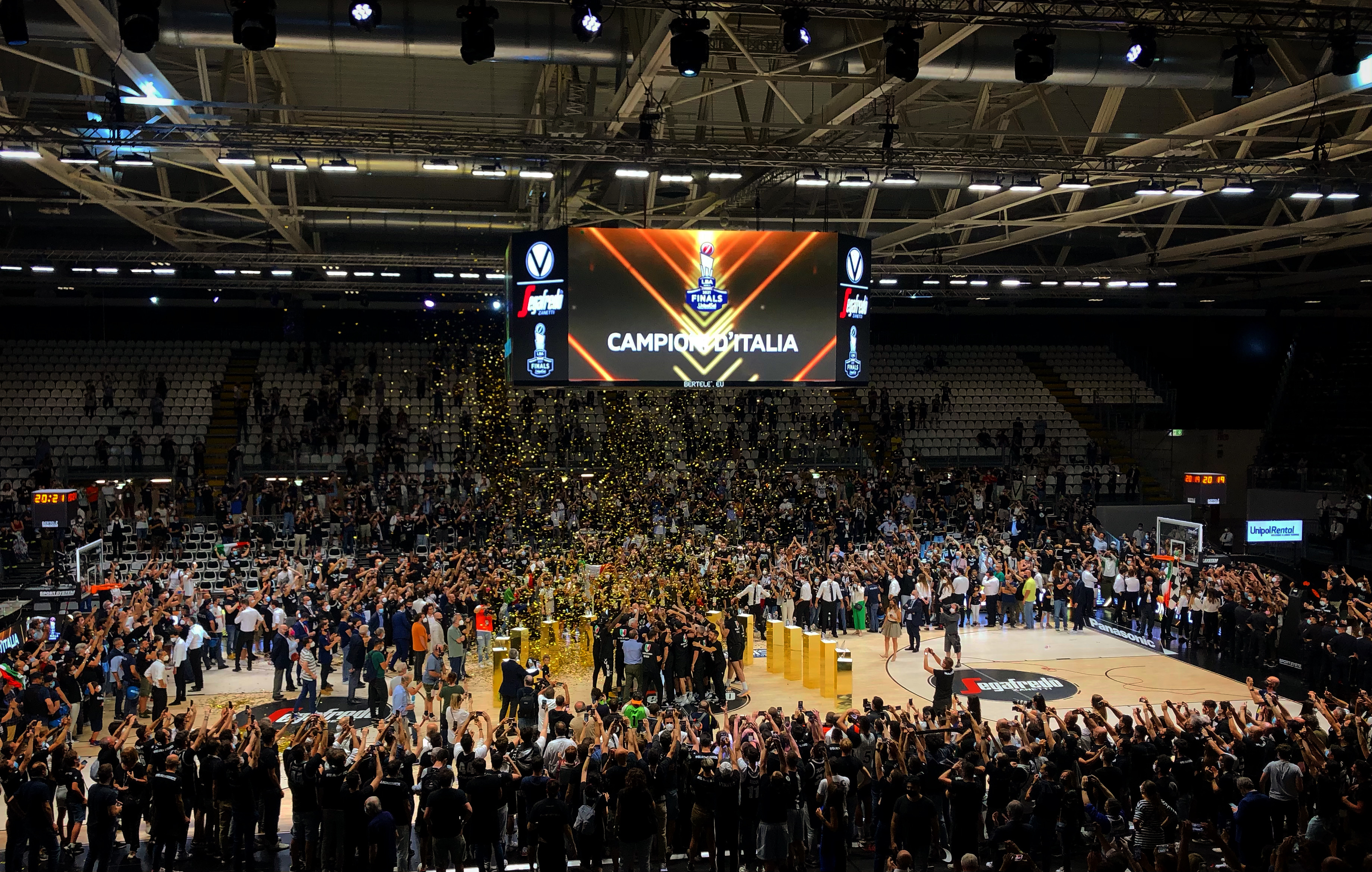
Segafredo Arena in June 2021

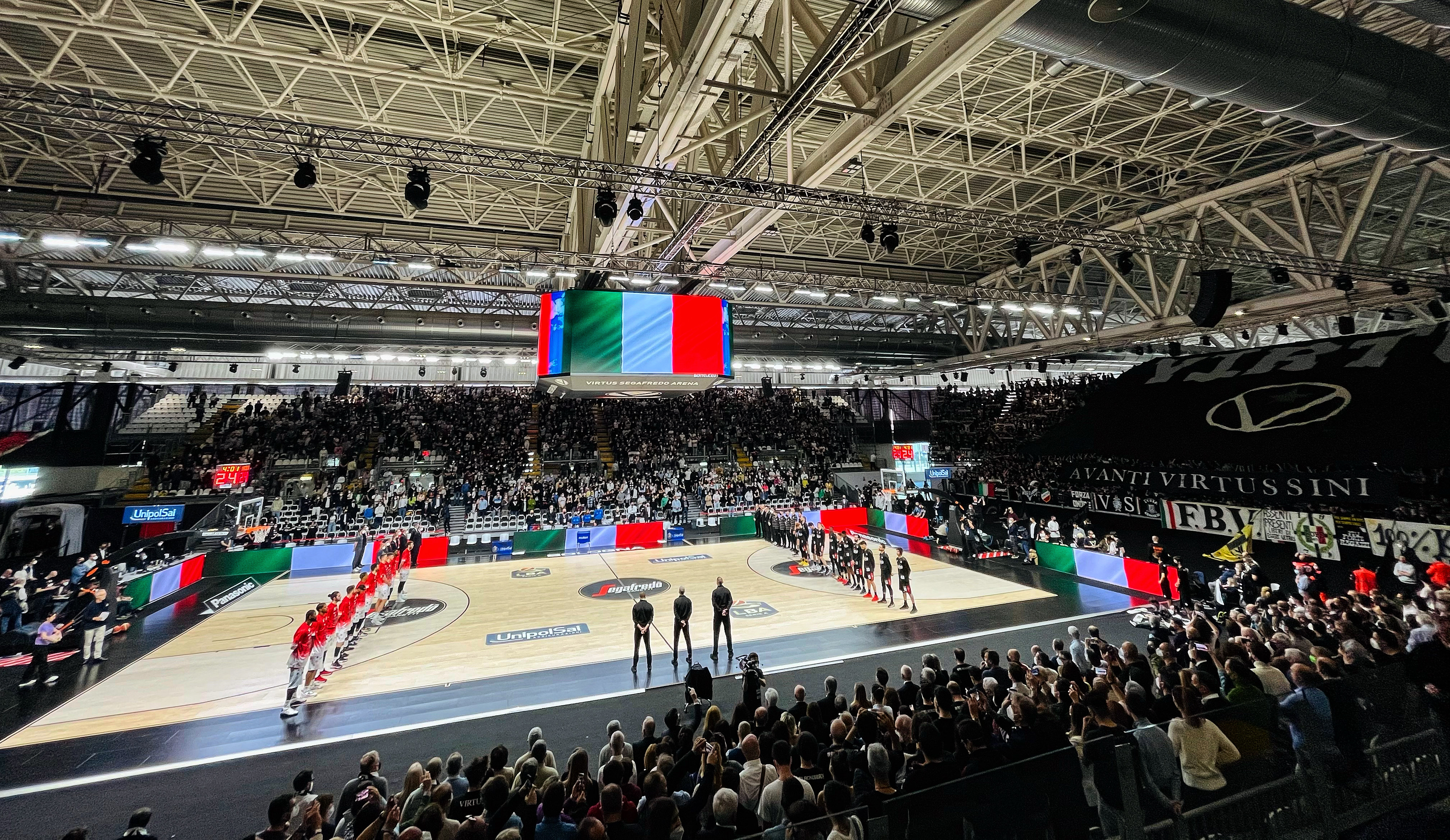
Segafredo Arena in April 2022

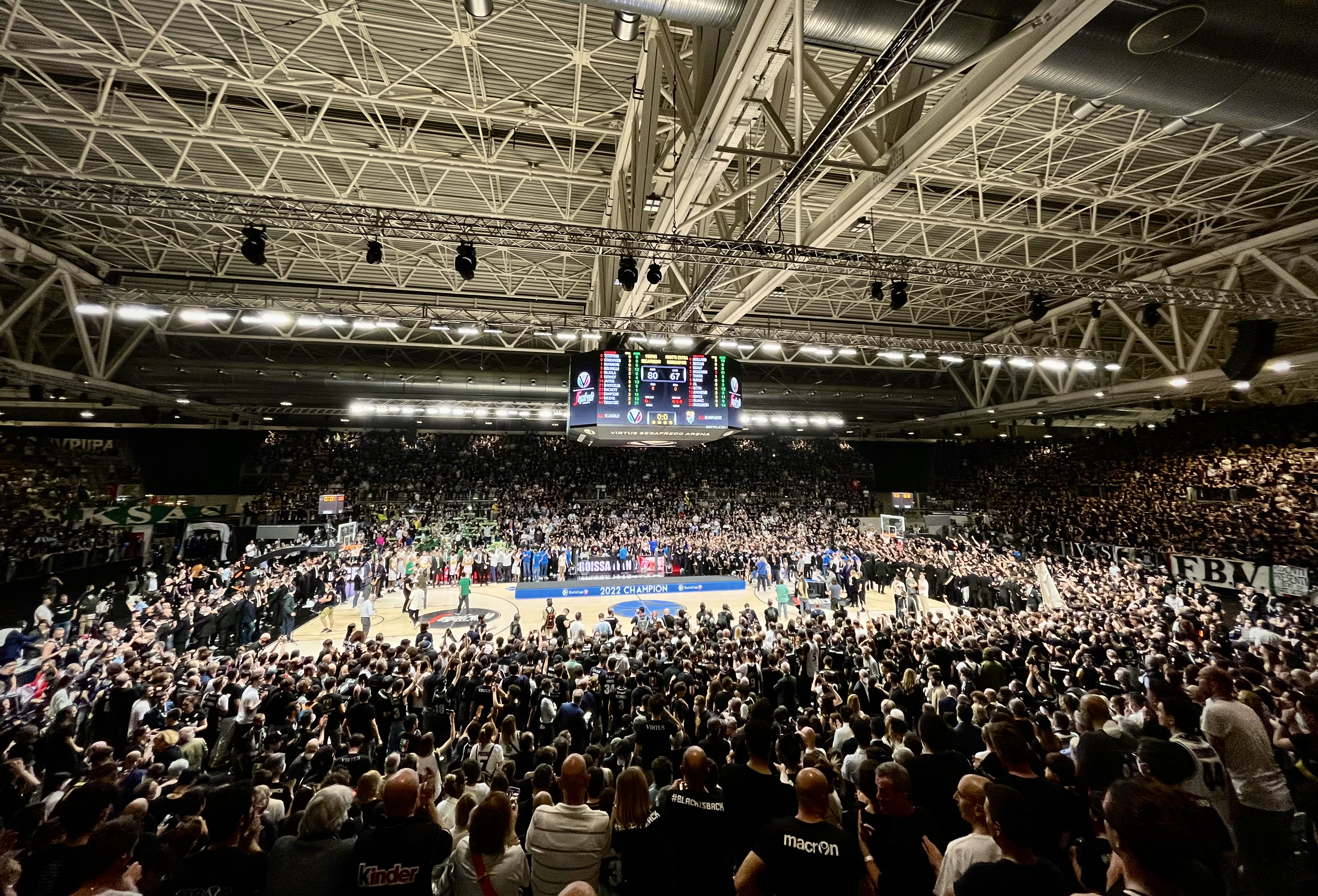
Segafredo Arena in May 2022

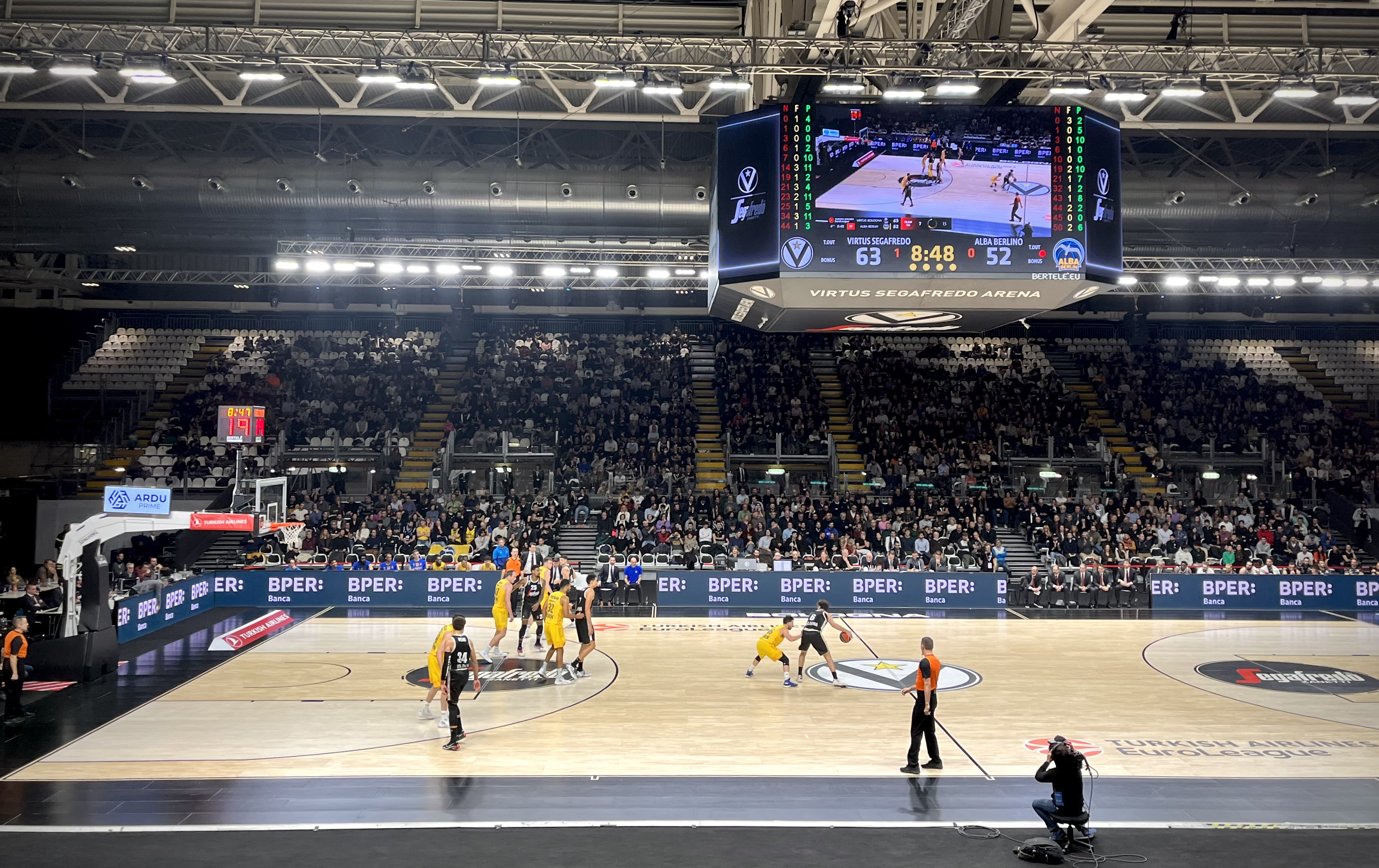
Segafredo Arena in December 2022

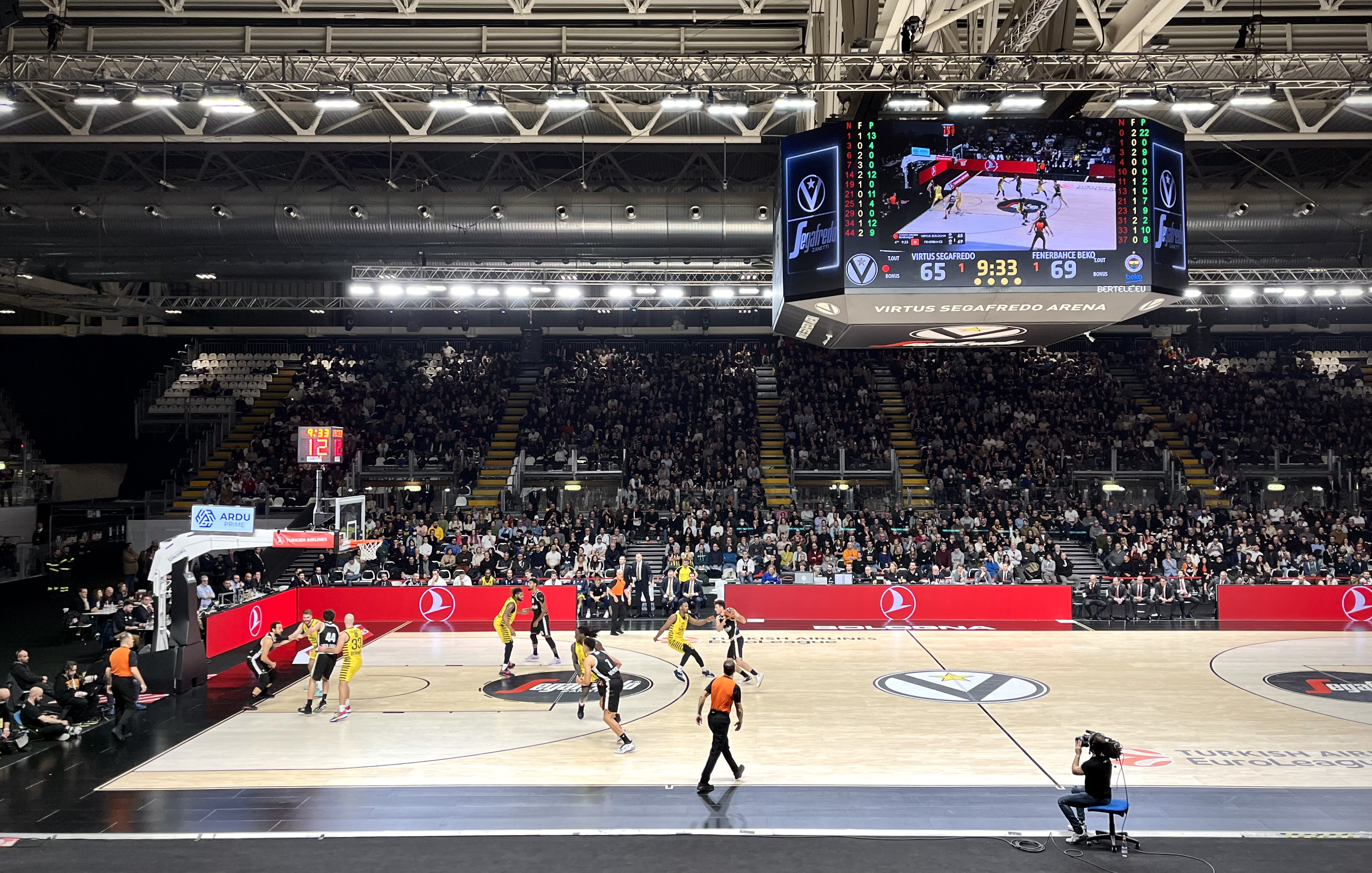
Segafredo Arena in December 2022

== See also ==
- List of indoor arenas in Italy
