= Andrew Andrews =

American basketball player (born 1993)

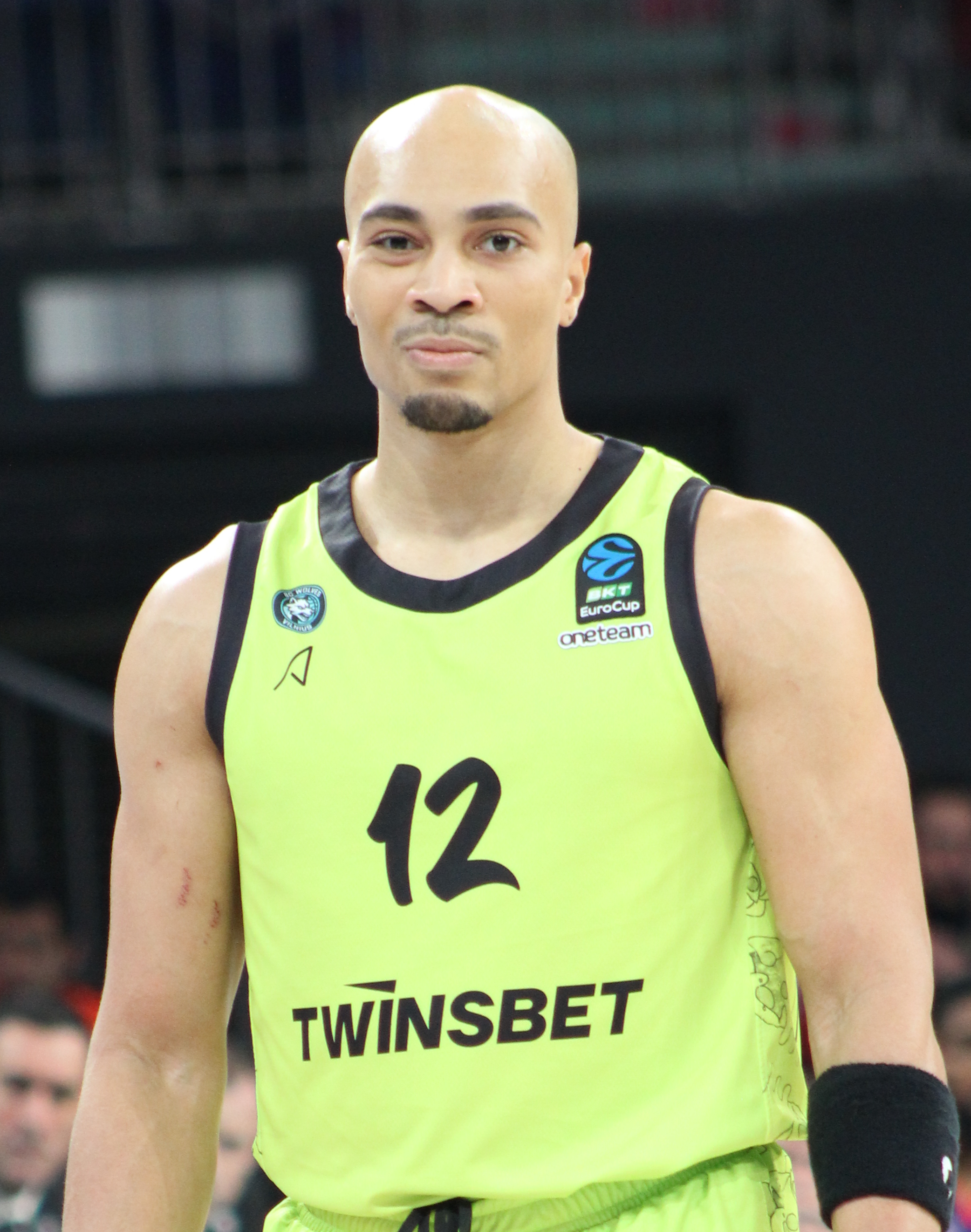
- Andrews with BC Wolves in 2024

No. 12 – Tezenis Verona
- Position: Shooting guard / point guard
- League: LBA

Personal information
- Born: May 25, 1993 (age 33) Portland, Oregon, U.S.
- Listed height: 6 ft 2 in (1.88 m)
- Listed weight: 200 lb (91 kg)

Career information
- High school: Benson Polytechnic (Portland, Oregon)
- College: Washington (2012–2016)
- NBA draft: 2016: undrafted
- Playing career: 2016–present

Career history
- 2016–2017: Best Balıkesir
- 2017–2018: Delaware 87ers
- 2018–2019: VEF Rīga
- 2019: Hapoel Afula
- 2019: Büyükçekmece
- 2020: Maccabi Haifa
- 2020–2021: Darüşşafaka Tekfen
- 2021–2022: Frutti Extra Bursaspor
- 2022–2023: Panathinaikos
- 2023: Frutti Extra Bursaspor
- 2023–2024: Joventut
- 2024–2025: Wolves Twinsbet
- 2025–2026: Cairns Taipans
- 2026–present: Scaligera Basket Verona

Career highlights
- First-team All-Pac-12 (2016)
- Stats at Basketball Reference
Medals
Men's basketball
Representing the United States
FIBA AmeriCup
Bronze medal – third place	2025 Managua

Andrew Delano Andrews (né Wray; born May 25, 1993) is an American professional basketball player for Scaligera Basket Verona of the Lega Basket Serie A (LBA). He played college basketball for the Washington Huskies and led the Pac-12 Conference in scoring as a senior. After going undrafted in the 2016 NBA draft, Andrews has played basketball professionally in Europe and Australia.

== Early life ==
Andrews was born as Andrew Wray in Portland, Oregon. His parents, Lee Williams Jr. and Patricia Hall, gave him a surname that did not match theirs for a reason he does not know. When he was aged 4, his parents split and he was adopted by his aunt who gave him her maiden name Andrews. He was raised by his aunt and grandmother. Andrews participated in sports including football, karate, tennis, ballet and swimming while growing up until he began to excel in basketball in the fourth grade.

== High school career ==
Andrews attended Benson Polytechnic High School. As a senior, he averaged 24 points, 5 rebounds and 5 assists per game leading Benson to the Oregon Class 5A State Title game. When he graduated, he was considered a three-star recruit by Rivals.com and was ranked 83rd by ESPN among point guard prospects.

== College career ==
Andrews came to Washington from Benson Polytechnic High School in Portland, Oregon. After sitting out the 2011–12 season following hip surgery, Andrews joined the Huskies' regular rotation as a redshirt freshman. As a senior, he averaged 20.9 points per game to lead the conference, and was named first-team All-Pac-12. In his last home game with the Huskies, Andrews scored a career-high 47 points against arch-rival Washington State.

== Professional career ==
After going undrafted in the 2016 NBA draft, Andrews joined the Los Angeles Clippers for the 2016 NBA Summer League.

=== Charlotte Hornets (2016) ===
On September 7, 2016, he signed with the Charlotte Hornets, but was later waived on October 20 after appearing in three preseason games.

=== Best Balikesir (2016–2017) ===
On December 11, 2016, Andrews signed with Best Balıkesir of the Turkish Super League. In 19 games with Best Balıkesir Andrews averaged 14.2 points, 3.5 rebounds, and 3.2 assists per game.

=== Delaware 87ers (2017–2018) ===
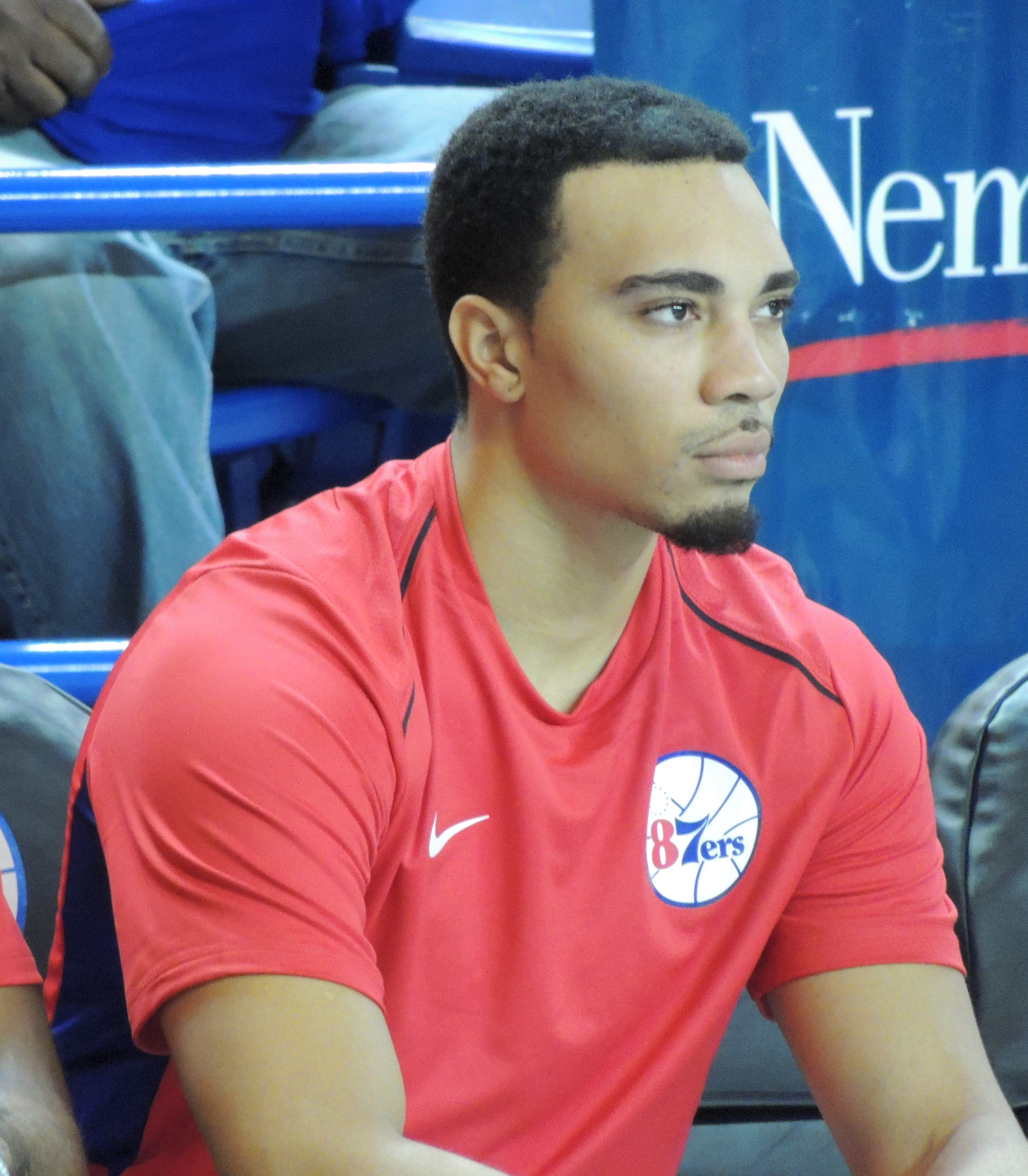
Andrews with the Delaware 87ers in 2017

On October 17, 2017, Andrews came back to the U.S. and was signed to the Delaware 87ers, the Philadelphia 76ers' G League affiliate.

=== VEF Rīga (2018–2019) ===
On November 15, 2018, Andrews signed with Latvian team VEF Rīga of the VTB United League.

=== Hapoel Afula (2019) ===
On February 2, 2019, Andrews parted ways with VEF Rīga to join the Israeli team Hapoel Afula for the rest of the season. In 6 games played for Afula, he averaged 26.7 points, 4.5 rebounds, 6.0 assists and 1.7 steals per game.

=== Büyükçekmece (2019) ===
On July 20, 2019, Andrews returned to Turkey for a second stint, signing with Büyükçekmece for the 2019–20 season. Andrews averaged 20.7 points, 4.4 assists and 1.5 steals per game.

=== Maccabi Haifa (2020) ===
On May 20, 2020, Andrews returned to Israel for a second stint, signing with Maccabi Haifa for the rest of 2019–20 season to replace Gregory Vargas.

=== Darüşşafaka (2020–2021) ===
On July 23, 2020, he has signed with Darüşşafaka of the Basketball Super League. Andrews averaged 15.9 points per game.

=== Türk Telekom (2021) ===
On June 26, 2021, he signed with Türk Telekom. However, on September 4, he was released after the team refused to grant a few days off to return to the United States because of a family matter.

=== Frutti Extra Bursaspor (2021–2022) ===
On October 1, 2021, Andrews signed with Frutti Extra Bursaspor.

=== Panathinaikos (2022–2023) ===
On July 16, 2022, Andrews signed a two-year contract with Panathinaikos of the Greek Basket League and the EuroLeague. In November of the same year, he was sidelined out of the team rotation after the acquisition of Dwayne Bacon and subsequently entered into a legal dispute with the club. On March 11, 2023, Andrews and Panathinaikos finally reached a settlement agreement, via mediation from the EuroLeague Players Association, and the player was released from his contract. In 4 EuroLeague games, Andrews averaged 8.2 points, 1.5 rebounds and 1.8 assists, while in only 2 domestic matches, he averaged 4.5 points, 1.5 rebounds and 1 assist per contest.

=== Return to Bursaspor (2023) ===
On March 15, 2023, Andrews made his official return to Turkey and Bursaspor.

=== Joventut (2023–2024) ===
On July 17, 2023, he signed with Joventut Badalona of the Spanish Liga ACB.

=== Wolves Twinsbet (2024–2025) ===
On July 26, 2024, Andrews signed with Wolves Twinsbet of the Lithuanian Basketball League (LKL) and the EuroCup.

=== Cairns Taipans (2025–2026) ===
On September 15, 2025, Andrews signed with the Cairns Taipans of the Australian National Basketball League (NBL) for the 2025–26 season.

=== Scaligera Basket Verona (2026–present) ===
On July 27, 2026, he signed with Scaligera Basket Verona of the Italian Lega Basket Serie A (LBA).
