= 2022 LBA Playoffs =

Tournament details
- Country: Italy
- Dates: 15 May–18 June
- Teams: 8

Final positions
- Champions: AX Armani Exchange Milano
- Runner-up: Virtus Segafredo Bologna

The 2022 LBA Playoffs, officially known as the 2022 LBA Playoff UnipolSai, was postseason tournament of the 2021–22 LBA season, which began on 25 September 2021. The playoffs started on May 15, 2022, with the match Milano–Reggiana. Virtus Segafredo Bologna are the defending champions, from the season 2020–21.

== Qualified teams ==
The eight first qualified teams after the end of the regular season were qualified to the playoffs.

Pos	Team	Pld	W	L	PF	PA	PD	Qualification
1	Virtus Segafredo Bologna	30	26	4	2666	2364	+302	Seeded teams
2	AX Armani Exchange Milano	30	24	6	2465	2155	+310	Seeded teams
3	Germani Basket Brescia	30	21	9	2524	2310	+214	Seeded teams
4	Bertram Derthona Basket	30	17	13	2418	2412	+6	Seeded teams
5	Umana Reyer Venezia	30	17	13	2331	2297	+34	Non-seeded teams
6	Banco di Sardegna Sassari	30	17	13	2541	2449	+92	Non-seeded teams
7	UNAHOTELS Reggio Emilia	30	15	15	2409	2401	+8	Non-seeded teams
8	Carpegna Prosciutto Pesaro	30	14	16	2408	2518	−110	Non-seeded teams

Updated to match(es) played on 8 May 2022. Source: LBA

== Bracket ==
Quarterfinals
Virtus Segafredo Bologna	82	70	75
Carpegna Prosciutto Pesaro	76	51	55
Bertram Derthona Basket	66	70	73	72
Umana Reyer Venezia	77	58	63	60
AX Armani Exchange Milano	91	91	89
UNAHOTELS Reggio Emilia	82	65	59
Germani Basket Brescia	104	85	68	95
Banco di Sardegna Sassari	97	91	98	98

Semifinals
Virtus Segafredo Bologna	77	91	77
Bertram Derthona Basket	73	70	69
AX Armani Exchange Milano	88	91	87
Banco di Sardegna Sassari	71	82	69

Finals
Virtus Segafredo Bologna	62	75	82	62	84	64
AX Armani Exchange Milano	66	68	94	77	78	81

== Quarterfinals ==
All times were in Central European Summer Time (UTC+02:00)

The quarterfinals were played in a best of five format.

Team 1	Series	Team 2	Game 1	Game 2	Game 3	Game 4	Game 5
Virtus Segafredo Bologna	3–0	Carpegna Prosciuto Pesaro	82–76	70–51	75–55		
AX Armani Exchange Milano	3–0	UNAHOTELS Reggio Emilia	91–82	91–65	89–59		
Germani Basket Brescia	1–3	Banco di Sardegna Sassari	104–97	85–91	68–98	95–98	
Bertram Derthona Basket	3–1	Umana Reyer Venezia	66–77	70–54	73–63	72–60	

=== Game 1 ===
15 May 2022	Virtus Segafredo Bologna	82–76 (Series: 1-0)	Carpegna Prosciutto Pesaro	Bologna
21:00 (CET)	Scoring by quarter: 24–22, 21–14, 17–18, 20–22
Discovery+, Rai Sport	Pts: Belinelli 14; Rebs: Jaiteh 5 Asts: Pajola 10; PIR: Pajola 19	Boxscore	Pts: Sanford 21; Rebs: Jones 5 Asts: Delfino 4 PIR: Jones 21	Arena: Segafredo Arena; Referees: Saverio Lanzarini, Carmelo Lo Guzzo, Alessandro Perciavalle

15 May 2022	AX Armani Exchange Milano	91–82 (Series: 1-0)	UNAHOTELS Reggio Emilia	Assago (Milan)
17:00 (CET)	Scoring by quarter: 24–18, 27–22, 29–22, 11–20
Discovery+, Eurosport	Pts: Shields 20; Rebs: Bentil 7 Asts: Rodríguez 6 PIR: Bentil 25	Boxscore	Pts: Thompson 21; Rebs: Baldi Rossi 6 Asts: Cinciarini 10; PIR: Cinciarini 27	Arena: Mediolanum Forum; Referees: Carmelo Paternicò, Alessandro Vicino, Denis Quarta

15 May 2022	Bertram Derthona Basket	66–77 (Series: 1-0)	Umana Reyer Venezia	Casale Monferrato (Alessandria)
19:00 (CET)	Scoring by quarter: 22–18, 15–17, 16–24, 13–18
Discovery+, Eurosport	Pts: Wright 16; Rebs: Mascolo 7 Asts: Wright 5 PIR: Cain 17	Boxscore	Pts: Watt 15; Rebs: Watt 6 Asts: Stone 5 PIR: Watt 17	Arena: PalaFerraris; Referees: Manuel Mazzoni, Guido Giovannetti, Valerio Grigioni

16 May 2022	Germani Basket Brescia	104–97 (Series: 1-0)	Banco di Sardegna Sassari	Brescia
20:45 (CET)	Scoring by quarter: 24–24, 28–23, 27–21, 25–29
Discovery+, Rai Sport	Pts: Della Valle 30; Rebs: Gabriel 8 Asts: Mitrou-Long 9 PIR: Della Valle 27	Boxscore	Pts: Bilan 22; Rebs: Bilan 11; Asts: Bendžius 4 PIR: Bilan 29	Arena: PalaLeonessa; Referees: Roberto Begnis, Manuel Attard, Andrea Bongiorni

=== Game 2 ===
17 May 2022	Virtus Segafredo Bologna	70–51 (Series: 2-0)	Carpegna Prosciutto Pesaro	Bologna
20:30 (CET)	Scoring by quarter: 12–13, 19–12, 16–13, 23–13
Discovery+, Eurosport	Pts: Alibegović 10; Rebs: Mannion 5 Asts: Cordinier 5 PIR: Mannion 17	Boxscore	Pts: Mejeris 12; Rebs: Jones 9 Asts: Moretti 4 PIR: Mejeris 13	Arena: Segafredo Arena; Referees: Michele Rossi, Alessandro Martolini, Christian Borgo

17 May 2022	AX Armani Exchange Milano	91–65 (Series: 2-0)	UNAHOTELS Reggio Emilia	Assago (Milan)
20:45 (CET)	Scoring by quarter: 27–14, 30–18, 21–13, 13–20
Discovery+, Rai Sport	Pts: Datome 16; Rebs: Ricci 6 Asts: Rodríguez 5 PIR: Datome 22	Boxscore	Pts: Cinciarini 19; Rebs: Larson 6 Asts: Crawford 3 PIR: Cinciarini 20	Arena: Mediolanum Forum; Referees: Tolga Sahin, Lorenzo Baldini, Martino Galasso

17 May 2022	Bertram Derthona Basket	70–58 (Series: 1-1)	Umana Reyer Venezia	Casale Monferrato (Alessandria)
20:00 (CET)	Scoring by quarter: 14–14, 16–11, 27–17, 13–16
Discovery+	Pts: Sanders 20; Rebs: Cannon 8 Asts: Wright 3 PIR: Sanders 23	Boxscore	Pts: Tonut 30; Rebs: Tonut 4 Asts: Theodore 3 PIR: Tonut 34	Arena: PalaFerraris; Referees: Carmelo Paternicò, Mark Bartoli, Alessandro Perciavalle

18 May 2022	Germani Basket Brescia	85–91 (Series: 1-1)	Banco di Sardegna Sassari	Brescia
20:30 (CET)	Scoring by quarter: 24–17, 21–24, 12–26, 28–24
Discovery+, Rai Sport	Pts: Mitrou-Long 27; Rebs: Brown 11; Asts: Mitrou-Long 6 PIR: Mitrou-Long 23	Boxscore	Pts: Bilan 16; Rebs: Bilan 11; Asts: Burnell 5 PIR: Bilan 24	Arena: PalaLeonessa; Referees: Saverio Lanzarini, Guido Giovannetti, Denis Quarta

=== Game 3 ===
19 May 2022	Carpegna Prosciutto Pesaro	55–75 (Series: 0-3)	Virtus Segafredo Bologna	Pesaro
20:45 (CET)	Scoring by quarter: 19–21, 16–14, 10–24, 10–16
Discovery+, Rai Sport	Pts: Lamb 15; Rebs: Jones 9 Asts: Mejeris 3 PIR: Jones 19	Boxscore	Pts: Jaiteh 15; Rebs: Weems 9 Asts: Cordinier 4 PIR: Jaiteh 22	Arena: Vitrifrigo Arena; Referees: Tolga Sahin, Lorenzo Baldini, Mark Bartoli

19 May 2022	UNAHOTELS Reggio Emilia	59–89 (Series: 0-3)	AX Armani Exchange Milano	Casalecchio di Reno (Bologna)
20:30 (CET)	Scoring by quarter: 13–21, 14–22, 14–27, 18–19
Discovery+	Pts: Bentil 16; Rebs: Ricci 7 Asts: Grant 6 PIR: Biligha 18	Boxscore	Pts: Strautiņš 12; Rebs: Hopkins 9 Asts: Cinciarini 7 PIR: Hopkins 11	Arena: Unipol Arena; Referees: Roberto Begnis, Beniamino Attard, Alessandro Martolini

19 May 2022	Umana Reyer Venezia	63–73 (Series: 1–2)	Bertram Derthona Basket	Mestre (Venice)
20:00 (CET)	Scoring by quarter: 12–20, 18–16, 18–21, 15–16
Discovery+, Eurosport	Pts: Brooks 16; Rebs: Brooks 6 Asts: Tonut 3 PIR: Brooks 21	Boxscore	Pts: Daum 19; Rebs: Wright 5 Asts: Wright 5 PIR: Daum 25	Arena: Taliercio; Referees: Michele Rossi, Carmelo Lo Guzzo, Andrea Bongiorni

20 May 2022	Banco di Sardegna Sassari	98–68 (Series: 2–1)	Germani Basket Brescia	Sassari
20:45 (CET)	Scoring by quarter: 23–25, 24–9, 33–15, 18–19
Discovery+, Rai Sport	Pts: Krušlin 20; Rebs: Bilan 8 Asts: Gentile 7 PIR: Krušlin 22	Boxscore	Pts: Brown 18; Rebs: Mitrou-Long 6 Asts: Mitrou-Long 7 PIR: Brown 19	Arena: PalaSerradimigni; Referees: Manuel Mazzoni, Alessandro Vicino, Valerio Grigioni

=== Game 4 ===
21 May 2022	Reyer Venezia	60–72 (Series: 1–3)	Bertram Derthona Basket	Mestre (Venice)
21:00 (CET)	Scoring by quarter: 12–18, 19–16, 15–20, 14–18
Discovery+, Eurosport, Rai Sport	Pts: Theodore 12; Rebs: Watt 6 Asts: three players 2 PIR: Watt 11	Boxscore	Pts: Macura 14; Rebs: Cannon, Daum 8 Asts: Wright 7 PIR: Wright 16	Arena: Taliercio; Referees: Saverio Lanzarini, Manuel Attard, Denny Borgioni

22 May 2022	Banco di Sardegna Sassari	98–95 (Series: 3–1)	Germani Basket Brescia	Sassari
21:00 (CET)	Scoring by quarter: 30–23, 30–30, 18–18, 20–24
Discovery+, Eurosport, Rai Sport	Pts: Burnell 21; Rebs: Bendžius 8 Asts: Robinson 6 PIR: Bilan 26	Boxscore	Pts: Mitrou-Long 38; Rebs: Cobbins 11; Asts: Mitrou-Long 7 PIR: Mitrou-Long 29	Arena: PalaSerradimigni; Referees: Carmelo Paternicò, Lorenzo Baldini, Mark Bartoli

== Semifinals ==
The semifinals were played in a best of five format.

Team 1	Series	Team 2	Game 1	Game 2	Game 3	Game 4	Game 5
Virtus Segafredo Bologna	3–0	Bertram Derthona Basket	77–73	91–70	77–69		
AX Armani Exchange Milano	3–0	Banco di Sardegna Sassari	88–71	91–82	87–69		

=== Game 1 ===
27 May 2022	Virtus Segafredo Bologna	77–73 (Series: 1–0)	Bertram Derthona Basket	Bologna
20:45 (CET)	Scoring by quarter: 21–16, 14–22, 16–17, 26–18
Discovery+, Eurosport, Rai Sport	Pts: Belinelli 24; Rebs: Shengelia 8 Asts: Teodosić 9 PIR: Belinelli 19	Boxscore	Pts: Sanders 16; Rebs: Cannon 6 Asts: Wright 6 PIR: Sanders 20	Arena: Segafredo Arena; Referees: Manuel Mazzoni, Lorenzo Baldini, Valerio Grigioni

28 May 2022	AX Armani Exchange Milano	88–71 (Series: 1–0)	Banco di Sardegna Sassari	Assago (Milan)
20:45 (CET)	Scoring by quarter: 32–26, 18–16, 21–15, 17–14
Discovery+, Eurosport, Rai Sport	Pts: Shields 16; Rebs: Hines 7 Asts: Rodríguez 8 PIR: Hall 23	Boxscore	Pts: Robinson 17; Rebs: Bendžius 7 Asts: Burnell, Gentile 3 PIR: Bendžius 24	Arena: Mediolanum Forum; Referees: Saverio Lanzarini, Alessandro Vicino, Denis Quarta

=== Game 2 ===
29 May 2022	Virtus Segafredo Bologna	91–70 (Series: 2–0)	Bertram Derthona Basket	Bologna
20:45 (CET)	Scoring by quarter: 20–26, 21–9, 31–20, 19–15
Discovery+, Eurosport, Rai Sport	Pts: Teodosić 17; Rebs: Tessitori 7 Asts: Teodosić 4 PIR: Teodosić 21	Boxscore	Pts: Macura 18; Rebs: Daum 6 Asts: Sanders 5 PIR: Macura 19	Arena: Segafredo Arena; Referees: Borys Ryzhyk, Carmelo Lo Guzzo, Andrea Bongiorni

30 May 2022	AX Armani Exchange Milano	91–82 (Series: 2–0)	Banco di Sardegna Sassari	Assago (Milan)
20:45 (CET)	Scoring by quarter: 22–18, 19–31, 27–20, 23–13
Discovery+, Eurosport, Rai Sport	Pts: Hall 17; Rebs: Hines 7 Asts: Rodríguez 5 PIR: Rodríguez 22	Boxscore	Pts: Bendžius 23; Rebs: Bilan 13; Asts: Robinson 8 PIR: Bendžius 29	Arena: Mediolanum Forum; Referees: Carmelo Paternicò, Michele Rossi, Denny Borgioni

=== Game 3 ===
31 May 2022	Bertram Derthona Basket	69–77 (Series: 0–3)	Virtus Segafredo Bologna	Casale Monferrato (Alessandria)
20:45 (CET)	Scoring by quarter: 13–18, 20–29, 18–15, 18–15
Discovery+, Eurosport, Rai Sport	Pts: Sanders 13; Rebs: Daum 7 Asts: Mascolo 3 PIR: Daum 16	Boxscore	Pts: Jaiteh 17; Rebs: Jaiteh 9 Asts: Shengelia 6 PIR: Jaiteh 27	Arena: PalaFerraris; Referees: Roberto Begnis, Manuel Attard, Mark Bartoli

1 June 2022	Banco di Sardegna Sassari	69–87 (Series: 0–3)	AX Armani Exchange Milano	Sassari
20:45 (CET)	Scoring by quarter: 19–17, 15–30, 19–24, 16–16
Discovery+, Eurosport, Rai Sport	Pts: Robinson 14; Rebs: Bilan 10; Asts: Robinson 4 PIR: Bilan 18	Boxscore	Pts: Baldasso 17; Rebs: Ricci 6 Asts: Rodríguez 6 PIR: Rodríguez 15	Arena: PalaSerradimigni; Referees: Borys Ryzhyk, Tolga Sahin, Guido Giovannetti

== Finals ==
The finals are being played in a best of seven format.

Team 1	Series	Team 2	Game 1	Game 2	Game 3	Game 4	Game 5	Game 6	Game 7
Virtus Segafredo Bologna	2–4	AX Armani Exchange Milano	62–66	75–68	82–94	62–77	84–78	64–81	

=== Game 1 ===
8 June 2022	Virtus Segafredo Bologna	62–66 (Series: 0–1)	AX Armani Exchange Milano	Bologna
21:00 (CET)	Scoring by quarter: 10–13, 17–15, 13–22, 22–16
Discovery+, Eurosport, Rai Sport	Pts: Teodosić 16; Rebs: Shengelia 7 Asts: Teodosić 6 PIR: Teodosić 19	Boxscore	Pts: Shields 18; Rebs: Hines 10; Asts: Rodríguez 7 PIR: Shields 18	Arena: Segafredo Arena; Referees: Borys Ryzhyk, Roberto Begnis, Tolga Sahin

=== Game 2 ===
10 June 2022	Virtus Segafredo Bologna	75–68 (Series: 1–1)	AX Armani Exchange Milano	Bologna
21:00 (CET)	Scoring by quarter: 18–23, 21–15, 17–16, 19–14
Discovery+, Eurosport, Rai Sport	Pts: Shengelia 22; Rebs: Jaiteh 10; Asts: Teodosić 8 PIR: Shengelia 25	Boxscore	Pts: Hall 16; Rebs: Melli 7 Asts: Rodríguez 7 PIR: Shields 15	Arena: Segafredo Arena; Referees: Carmelo Paternicò, Michele Rossi, Guido Giovannetti

=== Game 3 ===
12 June 2022	AX Armani Exchange Milano	94–82 (Series: 2–1)	Virtus Segafredo Bologna	Assago (Milan)
20:30 (CET)	Scoring by quarter: 31–27, 17–18, 30–23, 16–14
Discovery+, Eurosport, Rai Sport	Pts: Melli 22; Rebs: Shields 7 Asts: Rodríguez 8 PIR: Melli 22	Boxscore	Pts: Hackett 18; Rebs: Hackett 6 Asts: Hackett, Teodosić 5 PIR: Hackett 34	Arena: Mediolanum Forum; Referees: Saverio Lanzarini, Manuel Mazzoni, Manuel Attard

=== Game 4 ===
14 June 2022	AX Armani Exchange Milano	77–62 (Series: 3–1)	Virtus Segafredo Bologna	Assago (Milan)
20:30 (CET)	Scoring by quarter: 16–24, 24–10, 15–21, 22–7
Discovery+, Eurosport, Rai Sport	Pts: Shields 21; Rebs: Melli 6 Asts: Rodríguez 5 PIR: Shields 27	Boxscore	Pts: Shengelia 21; Rebs: Jaiteh 8 Asts: Hackett, Pajola 4 PIR: Jaiteh, Shengelia 20	Arena: Mediolanum Forum; Referees: Borys Ryzhyk, Michele Rossi, Lorenzo Baldini

=== Game 5 ===
16 June 2022	Virtus Segafredo Bologna	84–78 (Series: 2–3)	AX Armani Exchange Milano	Bologna
20:45 (CET)	Scoring by quarter: 25–12, 17–27, 20–19, 22–20
Discovery+, Eurosport, Rai Sport	Pts: Jaiteh 17; Rebs: Jaiteh 13; Asts: Shengelia, Teodosić 5 PIR: Jaiteh 34	Boxscore	Pts: Melli 20; Rebs: Hall 6 Asts: Rodríguez 6 PIR: Melli 23	Arena: Segafredo Arena; Referees: Manuel Mazzoni, Saverio Lanzarini, Guido Giovannetti

=== Game 6 ===
18 June 2022	AX Armani Exchange Milano	81–64 (Series: 4–2)	Virtus Segafredo Bologna	Assago (Milan)
20:30 (CET)	Scoring by quarter: 29–16, 14–20, 18–10, 20–18
Discovery+, Eurosport, Rai Sport	Pts: Datome 23; Rebs: Hines 6 Asts: Rodríguez 8 PIR: Datome 20	Boxscore	Pts: Alibegovic 11; Rebs: Jaiteh 7 Asts: Hackett 4 PIR: Jaiteh 13	Arena: Mediolanum Forum; Referees: Carmelo Paternico, Manuel Attard, Lorenzo Baldini
