= 2024–25 LBA season =

LBA
- League: Lega Basket Serie A
- Season: 2024–2025
- Dates: 29 September 2024 – 17 June 2025
- Teams: 16

Regular season
- Season MVP: (Croatia) Miro Bilan

Finals
- Champions: Virtus Bologna (17th title)
- Runners-up: Germani Brescia
- Finals MVP: (Georgia (country)) Tornike Shengelia

Statistical leaders
Points	(United States) Rob Gray	21.1
Rebounds	(Canada) Mfiondu Kabengele	9.8
Assists	(Italy) Andrea Cinciarini	7.3

Lega Basket Serie A seasons
- ← 2023–24 2025–26 →

The 2024–25 LBA season was the 103rd season of the Lega Basket Serie A (LBA), the men's top tier professional basketball division of the Italian basketball league system.

It began on September 29, 2024.

== Teams ==
Number of teams	Region	Team(s)
4	Lombardy	Olimpia Milano; Pallacanestro Brescia; Pallacanestro Varese; Vanoli Cremona
2	Campania	Napoli Basket; Scafati Basket
2	Emilia-Romagna	Pallacanestro Reggiana; Virtus Bologna
2	Veneto	Universo Treviso Basket; Reyer Venezia
1	Piedmont	Derthona Basket
1	Sardinia	Dinamo Sassari
1	Friuli-Venezia Giulia	Pallacanestro Trieste
1	Trentino-Alto Adige/Südtirol	Aquila Basket Trento
1	Tuscany	Pistoia Basket 2000
1	Sicily	Trapani Shark

Location of teams in 2024–25 LBA season

Team	Home city	Arena	Capacity	2023–24 result
Dinamo Sassari	Sassari	PalaSerradimigni	5,000	10th
Derthona Basket	Tortona	PalaFerraris	3,510	8th
Aquila Basket Trento	Trento	PalaTrento	4,360	7th
Olimpia Milano	Milan	Forum di Milano	12,331	1st
Pistoia Basket 2000	Pistoia	PalaCarrara	3,916	6th
Pallacanestro Brescia	Brescia	PalaLeonessa	5,200	3rd
Scafati Basket	Scafati	PalaMangano	3,700	12th
Napoli Basket	Naples	PalaBarbuto	5,500	9th
Universo Treviso Basket	Treviso	PalaVerde	5,134	13th
Pallacanestro Varese	Varese	Palasport Lino Oldrini	5,107	14th
Pallacanestro Trieste 2004	Trieste	PalaTrieste	6,943	promoted to LBA
Trapani Shark	Trapani	Palallio	4,575	promoted to LBA
Reyer Venezia	Venice	Palasport Taliercio	3,506	4th
Pallacanestro Reggiana	Reggio Emilia	PalaBigi	4,530	5th
Vanoli Cremona	Cremona	PalaRadi	3,519	11th
Virtus Bologna	Bologna	Virtus Arena	9,980	2nd

== Regular season ==
In the regular season, teams play against each other home-and-away in a round-robin format. The matchdays are from 28 September 2024 to 11 May 2025.

Points scored in overtime counts toward tiebreakers. Tiebreakers are based on articule 62 of Regolamento Esecutivo Gare.

Pos	Team	Pld	W	L	PF	PA	PD	Pts	Qualification
1	Virtus Bologna	30	23	7	2581	2321	+260	46	Qualification to Playoffs
2	Trapani Shark	30	22	8	2838	2556	+282	44 (Note: Trapani 3-1, Brescia 2-2, Trento 1-3)	Qualification to Playoffs
3	Pallacanestro Brescia	30	22	8	2722	2541	+181	44	Qualification to Playoffs
4	Aquila Basket Trento	30	22	8	2654	2445	+209	44	Qualification to Playoffs
5	Olimpia Milano	30	20	10	2683	2510	+173	40	Qualification to Playoffs
6	Pallacanestro Trieste 2004	30	18	12	2616	2548	+68	36 (Note: Trieste 181-178 Reggiana)	Qualification to Playoffs
7	Pallacanestro Reggiana	30	18	12	2390	2328	+62	36	Qualification to Playoffs
8	Reyer Venezia	30	16	14	2494	2404	+90	32	Qualification to Playoffs
9	Derthona Tortona	30	15	15	2586	2580	+6	30	
10	Dinamo Sassari	30	12	18	2434	2536	−102	24 (Note: Sassari 172-164 Treviso)	
11	Universo Treviso Basket	30	12	18	2536	2643	−107	24	
12	Pallacanestro Varese	30	10	20	2589	2846	−257	20	
13	Vanoli Basket Cremona	30	9	21	2394	2539	−145	18 (Note: Cremona 181-166 Napoli)	
14	Napoli Basket	30	9	21	2509	2667	−158	18	
15	Scafati Basket	30	6	24	2532	2787	−255	12 (Note: Scafati 198-191 Pistoia)	Relegation to Serie A2
16	Pistoia Basket 2000	30	6	24	2362	2669	−307	12	Relegation to Serie A2

Updated to match(es) played on 11 May 2025. Source: LBA

=== Results ===
Home \ Away	BRE	CRE	MIL	NAP	PIS	REG	SAS	SCA	TOR	TRA	TRE	TRI	TVS	VAR	VEN	VBO
Pallacanestro Brescia	—	99–87	73–79	97–84	90–83	79–66	94–87	86–72	98–106	74–95	83–77	93–90	114–91	118–94	97–89	98–97
Vanoli Basket Cremona	89–100	—	83–95	94–85	65–66	74–77	65–80	88–85	94–99	85–80	86–89	81–101	94–77	78–60	78–86	69–74
Olimpia Milano	88–85	118–83	—	89–82	95–80	108–106	100–75	100–72	94–98	105–90	89–87	87–74	90–80	119–92	79–78	73–82
Napoli Basket	90–85	81–87	95–87	—	70–74	76–84	87–70	96–94	92–83	77–95	89–114	83–92	69–84	87–97	80–81	93–88
Pistoia Basket 2000	84–73	65–89	82–115	88–82	—	73–70	63–86	89–91	89–93	88–94	88–92	69–89	84–90	111–96	64–77	62–86
Pallacanestro Reggiana	68–80	78–51	87–78	89–86	86–72	—	84–58	90–57	86–82	89–94	76–92	81–96	88–64	97–80	87–92	57–69
Dinamo Sassari	77–96	93–89	72–78	94–76	77–75	72–79	—	86–97	87–82	92–80	81–84	98–86	96–94	81–86	96–97	76–68
Scafati Basket	93–95	85–77	78–83	81–91	107–102	69–84	98–82	—	79–102	66–83	110–119	107–110	87–92	94–85	92–96	87–104
Derthona Tortona	78–85	80–68	68–85	82–89	94–68	67–69	71–68	99–94	—	91–101	91–77	82–85	90–95	89–82	89–82	66–98
Trapani Shark	94–88	79–73	89–81	95–85	104–60	109–73	88–68	101–87	78–84	—	107–99	131–88	95–82	106–93	110–100	88–89
Aquila Basket Trento	75–78	76–80	91–57	90–83	87–64	84–63	95–77	88–78	85–89	83–80	—	76–68	101–86	106–100	82–70	87–79
Pallacanestro Trieste 2004	65–69	91–83	84–78	109–82	80–75	85–97	92–76	88–75	86–72	93–98	88–94	—	85–73	107–81	70–76	85–78
Universo Treviso Basket	86–84	87–84	79–89	78–90	91–88	90–94	70–76	104–75	92–91	71–87	76–83	95–100	—	88–86	83–72	74–80
Pallacanestro Varese	77–118	85–87	94–92	89–86	102–95	63–78	89–84	95–82	95–105	100–109	79–92	85–80	92–89	—	77–86	104–95
Reyer Venezia	89–90	87–70	85–72	91–68	90–93	59–62	78–84	75–69	94–82	91–82	70–74	103–91	75–78	83–64	—	68–76
Virtus Bologna	91–79	81–63	86–80	86–75	84–68	69–45	95–85	97–71	85–81	101–96	80–75	70–78	104–97	104–67	85–74	—

Source: LBA
Legend: Blue = home team win; Red = away team win.
Matches with lighter background shading were decided after overtime.

== Playoffs ==
Teams in bold advanced to the next round. The numbers to the left of each team indicate the team's seeding, the numbers to the right indicate the result of the series including result in bold of the team that won in that series.

Playoffs are played in 2-2-1 format where better seeded hosts first, second and fifth game while worse seeded host third and fourth game.

Quarterfinals
1	**Virtus Bologna**	**3**
8	Reyer Venezia	2
4	Aquila Basket Trento	1
5	**Olimpia Milano**	**3**
2	**Trapani Shark**	**3**
7	Pallacanestro Reggiana	0
3	**Pallacanestro Brescia**	**3**
6	Pallacanestro Trieste 2004	1

Semifinals
1	**Virtus Bologna**	**3**
5	Olimpia Milano	1
2	Trapani Shark	0
3	**Pallacanestro Brescia**	**3**

Finals
1	**Virtus Bologna**	**3**
3	Pallacanestro Brescia	0

=== Quarterfinals ===
Team 1	Series	Team 2	Game 1	Game 2	Game 3	Game 4	Game 5
**Virtus Bologna**	**3**–2	Reyer Venezia	**90**–85	**77**–75	82–**89**	78–**84**	**86**–84
Aquila Basket Trento	1–**3**	**Olimpia Milano**	70–**73**	**70**–67	79–**107**	82–**89**	
**Trapani Shark**	**3**–0	Pallacanestro Reggiana	**80**–75	**102**–88	**90**–83		
**Pallacanestro Brescia**	**3**–1	Pallacanestro Trieste 2004	**89**–77	92–**103**	**80**–70	**92**–88	

=== Semifinals ===
Team 1	Series	Team 2	Game 1	Game 2	Game 3	Game 4	Game 5
**Virtus Bologna**	**3**–1	Olimpia Milano	**68**–67	66–**85**	**78**–68	**84**–78	
Trapani Shark	0–**3**	**Pallacanestro Brescia**	92–**93**	77–**85**	86–**92**		

=== Finals ===
Team 1	Series	Team 2	Game 1	Game 2	Game 3	Game 4	Game 5
**Virtus Bologna**	**3**–0	Pallacanestro Brescia	**90**–87	**75**–65	**96**–74		

=== Game 1 ===
12 June 2025	**Virtus Segafredo Bologna**	**90**–87	Germani Brescia
20:30 (CET)	Scoring by quarter: 20–**23**, 21–**22**, 22–22, **27**–20
	Pts: Shengelia 29; Morgan 19; Rebs: Pajola 7 Asts: Pajola 4	Boxscore	Pts: Bilan 16; Rebs: Burnell 6 Asts: Ivanovic 11	Arena: Virtus Segafredo Arena; Referees: Attard; Bartoli; Grigioni

=== Game 2 ===
14 June 2025	**Virtus Segafredo Bologna**	**75**–65	Germani Brescia
20:30 (CET)	Scoring by quarter: **22**–21, **17**–11, 19–19, **17**–14
	Pts: Shengelia 15; Rebs: Shengelia 8 Asts: Shengelia 7 Hackett 6	Boxscore	Pts: Burnell 21; Rebs: Burnell 8 Bilan 7 Asts: Della Valle 8	Arena: Virtus Segafredo Arena; Referees: Rossi; Giovannetti; Perciavalle

=== Game 3 ===
17 June 2025	Germani Brescia	74–**96**	**Virtus Segafredo Bologna**
20:30 (CET)	Scoring by quarter: 15–**28**, 13–**22**, 23–**26**, **23**–20
	Pts: Burnell 24; Rebs: Bilan 8 Asts: Burnell 4	Boxscore	Pts: Shengelia 31; Rebs: Shengelia 9 Asts: Taylor 6	Arena: PalaLeonessa; Referees: Lanzarini; Bongiorni; Gonella

== Final standings ==
Pos	Team	Pld	W	L	Qualification or relegation
1	Virtus Bologna (C)	42	32	10	Already qualified to EuroLeague
2	Pallacanestro Brescia	40	28	12	
3	Trapani Shark	36	25	11	Qualification to Champions League regular season
4	Olimpia Milano	38	24	14	Already qualified to EuroLeague
5	Aquila Basket Trento	34	23	11	Qualification to EuroCup
6	Pallacanestro Trieste 2004	34	19	15	Qualification to Champions League regular season
7	Pallacanestro Reggiana	33	18	15	Qualification to Champions League qualifying rounds
8	Reyer Venezia	35	18	17	Qualification to EuroCup
9	Derthona Tortona	30	15	15	
10	Banco di Sardegna Sassari	30	12	18	
11	Universo Treviso Basket	30	12	18	
12	Pallacanestro Varese	30	10	20	
13	Vanoli Basket Cremona	30	9	21	
14	Napoli Basket	30	9	21	
15	Scafati Basket (R)	30	6	24	Relegation to Serie A2
16	Pistoia Basket 2000 (R)	30	6	24	Relegation to Serie A2

Source: LBA
(C) Champions; (R) Relegated

== Awards ==
Pos.	Player	Team	Ref.
Lega Serie A MVP
C	(Croatia) Miro Bilan	Germani Brescia	
Lega Serie A Finals MVP
PF	(Georgia (country)) Tornike Shengelia	Virtus Segafredo Bologna	
Domestic Player of the Year
SG	(Italy) Amedeo Della Valle	Germani Brescia	
Best Young Player
PG	(United Kingdom) Quinn Ellis	Olimpia Milano	
Best Defender
PG	(Italy) Alessandro Pajola	Virtus Segafredo Bologna	
Sixth Man of the Year
PG	(United States) JD Notae	Trapani Shark	
Most Improved Player
SF	(Italy) Saliou Niang	Dolomiti Energia Trento	
Coach of the Year
HC	(Italy) Paolo Galbiati	Dolomiti Energia Trento	
All-Lega Serie A Team
PG	(United States) Justin Robinson	Trapani Shark	
SG	(Italy) Amedeo Della Valle	Germani Brescia	
SF	(United States) Anthony Lamb	Dolomiti Energia Trento	
PF	(Georgia (country)) Tornike Shengelia	Virtus Segafredo Bologna	
C	(Croatia) Miro Bilan	Germani Brescia	

== Italian clubs in European competitions ==
Team	Competition	Progress
EA7 Emporio Armani Milano	EuroLeague	Regular Season, 11th
Virtus Segafredo Bologna	EuroLeague	Regular Season, 17th
Umana Reyer Venezia	EuroCup	Playoffs, Eighthfinals
Dolomiti Energia Trento	EuroCup	Regular Season, 9th
Bertram Derthona Tortona	Champions League	Playoffs, Quarterfinals
Unahotels Reggio Emilia	Champions League	Playoffs, Quarterfinals
Banco di Sardegna Sassari	Champions League	Qualifying rounds
Banco di Sardegna Sassari	FIBA Europe Cup	Second Phase
