= Armoni Brooks =

American basketball player (born 1998)

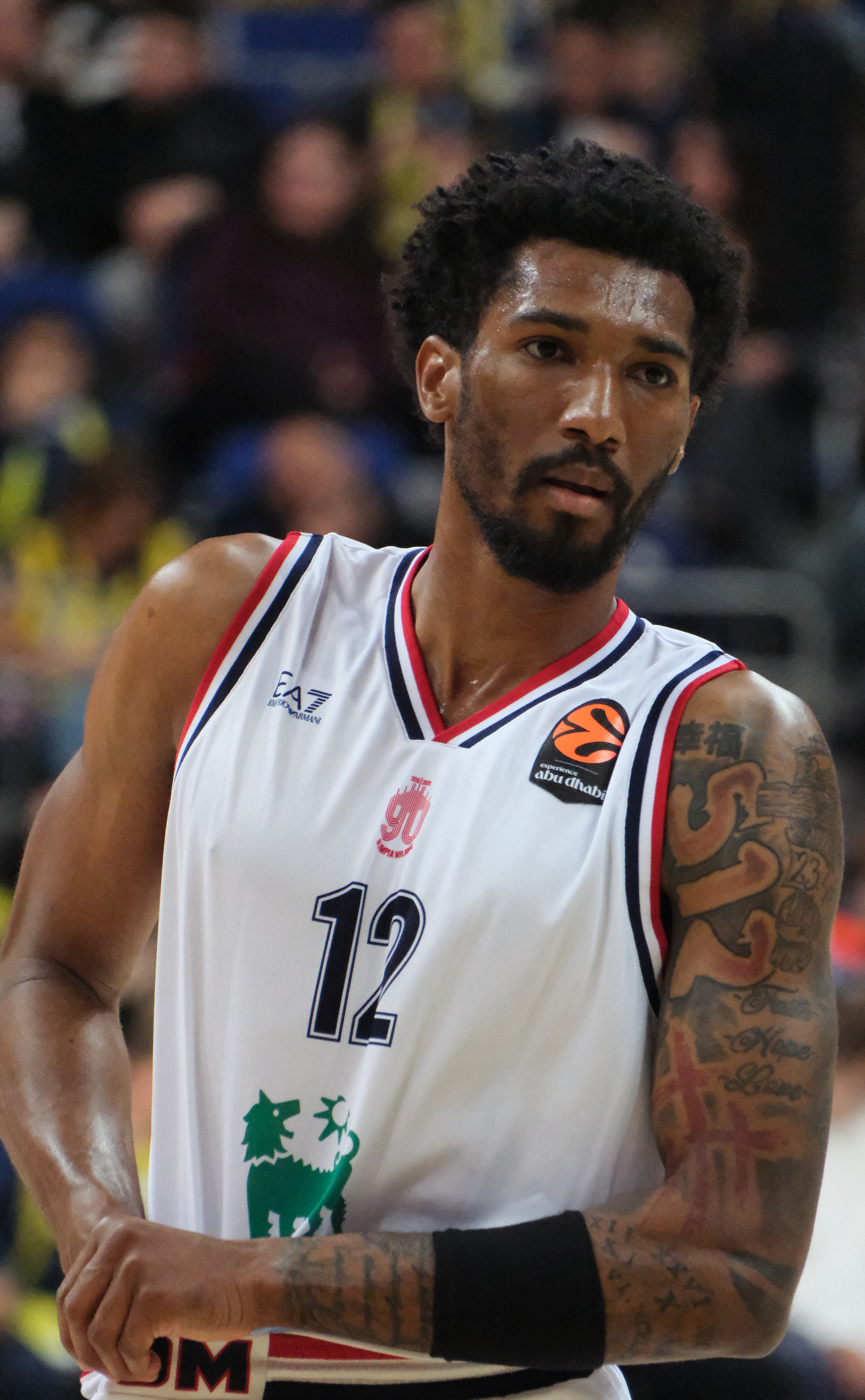
- Brooks with Olimpia Milano in 2026

No. 12 – Valencia Basket
- Position: Shooting guard / point guard
- League: Liga ACB; EuroLeague

Personal information
- Born: June 5, 1998 (age 28) Waco, Texas, U.S.
- Listed height: 6 ft 3 in (1.91 m)
- Listed weight: 195 lb (88 kg)

Career information
- High school: McNeil (Austin, Texas)
- College: Houston (2016–2019)
- NBA draft: 2019: undrafted
- Playing career: 2019–present

Career history
- 2019–2020: College Park Skyhawks
- 2021: Rio Grande Valley Vipers
- 2021–2022: Houston Rockets
- 2022: College Park Skyhawks
- 2022: Toronto Raptors
- 2022–2023: College Park Skyhawks
- 2023–2024: Brooklyn Nets
- 2023–2024: →Long Island Nets
- 2024: Ontario Clippers
- 2024–2026: Olimpia Milano
- 2026–present: ASVEL
- 2026–present: →Valencia

Career highlights
- Lega Serie A champion (2026); Italian Cup winner (2026); 2× Italian Supercup winner (2024, 2025); Lega Serie A MVP (2026); Lega Serie A Finals MVP (2026); All-Lega Serie A Team (2026); Lega Serie A Most Spectacular Player (2026); Italian Cup MVP (2026); Second-team All-AAC (2019); AAC Sixth Man of the Year (2018)
- Stats at NBA.com
- Stats at Basketball Reference

Armoni Daetrell Brooks (born June 5, 1998) is an American professional basketball player for Valencia Basket of the Liga ACB and the EuroLeague, on loan from ASVEL. He played college basketball for the Houston Cougars.

== College career ==
Brooks attended McNeil High School in Austin, Texas, where he played basketball. Lightly recruited out of high school, he enrolled at the University of Houston to play for the Houston Cougars men's basketball team under head coach Kelvin Sampson. As a junior, Brooks posted 13.4 points and 6.3 rebounds in 30.7 minutes per game. He was named to the All-AAC Second Team and All-AAC Tournament Team. Brooks declared for the 2019 NBA draft, and lost his final year of eligibility for college basketball. Prior to the draft, Brooks' shooting ability was considered his best asset.

== Professional career ==
=== College Park Skyhawks (2019–2020) ===
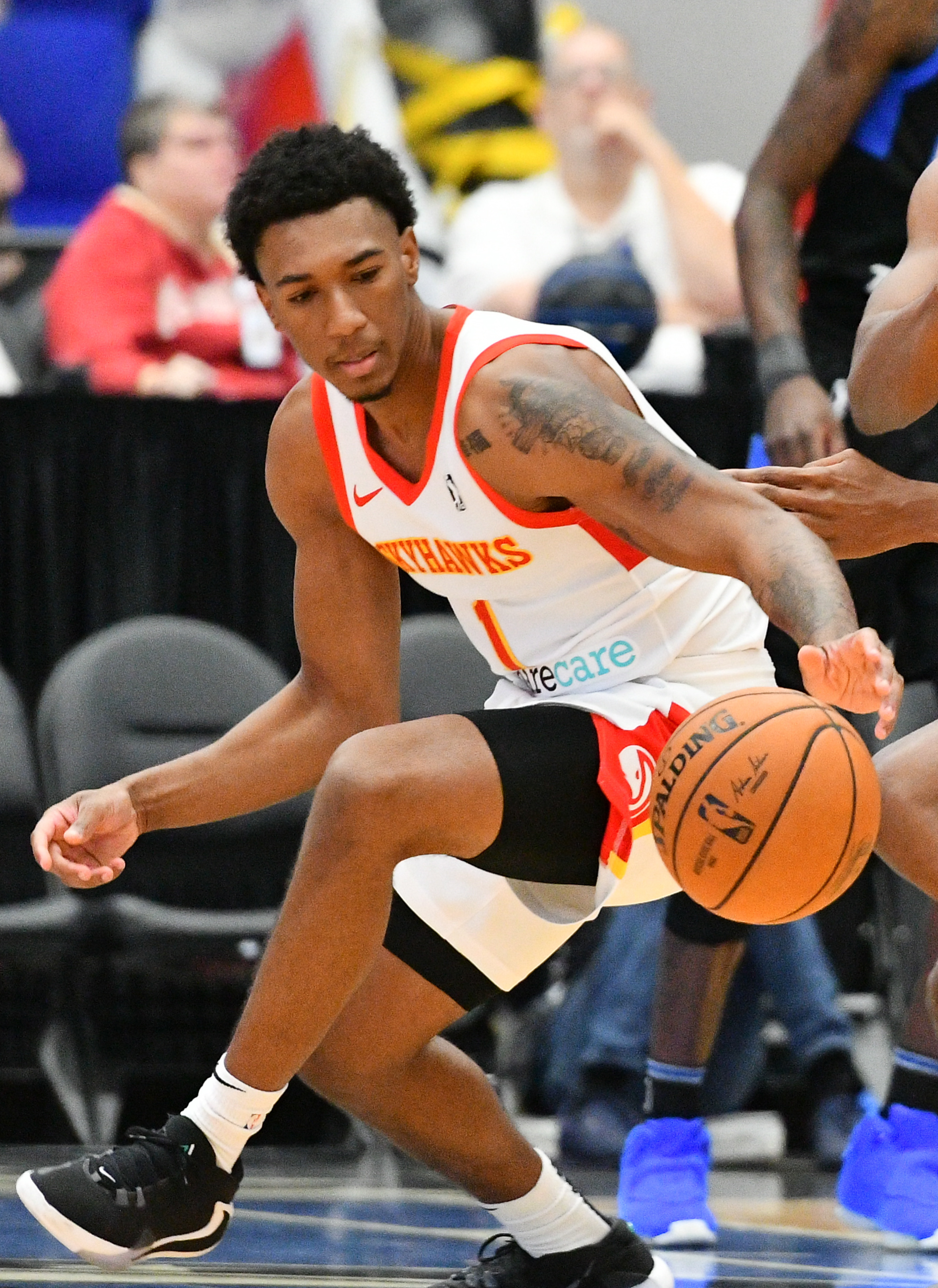
Brooks with the College Park Skyhawks in 2019

After going undrafted in the 2019 NBA draft, Brooks played with the Washington Wizards in the 2019 NBA Summer League. In August 2019, he signed with the Atlanta Hawks, but was waived on October 18. He was subsequently rostered on the Hawks' NBA G League affiliate, the College Park Skyhawks. On January 24, 2020, Brooks scored a career-high 38 points against the Lakeland Magic and four days later, he scored 32 points against the Rio Grande Valley Vipers. Throughout the season, he averaged 10.7 points and 3.4 rebounds for the Skyhawks.

On April 20, 2020, Brooks signed with the Saskatchewan Rattlers of the Canadian Elite Basketball League. However, he never played for the Rattlers, as he sat out the season due to the COVID-19 pandemic.

=== Rio Grande Valley Vipers (2021) ===
On January 11, 2021, Brooks was selected by the Rio Grande Valley Vipers in the first round of the NBA G League draft. In 15 games during the G League hub season, he averaged 16.8 points, 3.7 rebounds, 3.0 assists, and 1.07 steals while leading the G League in 3-pointers made (57), averaging 3.8 on 37.5 percent shooting.

=== Houston Rockets (2021–2022) ===
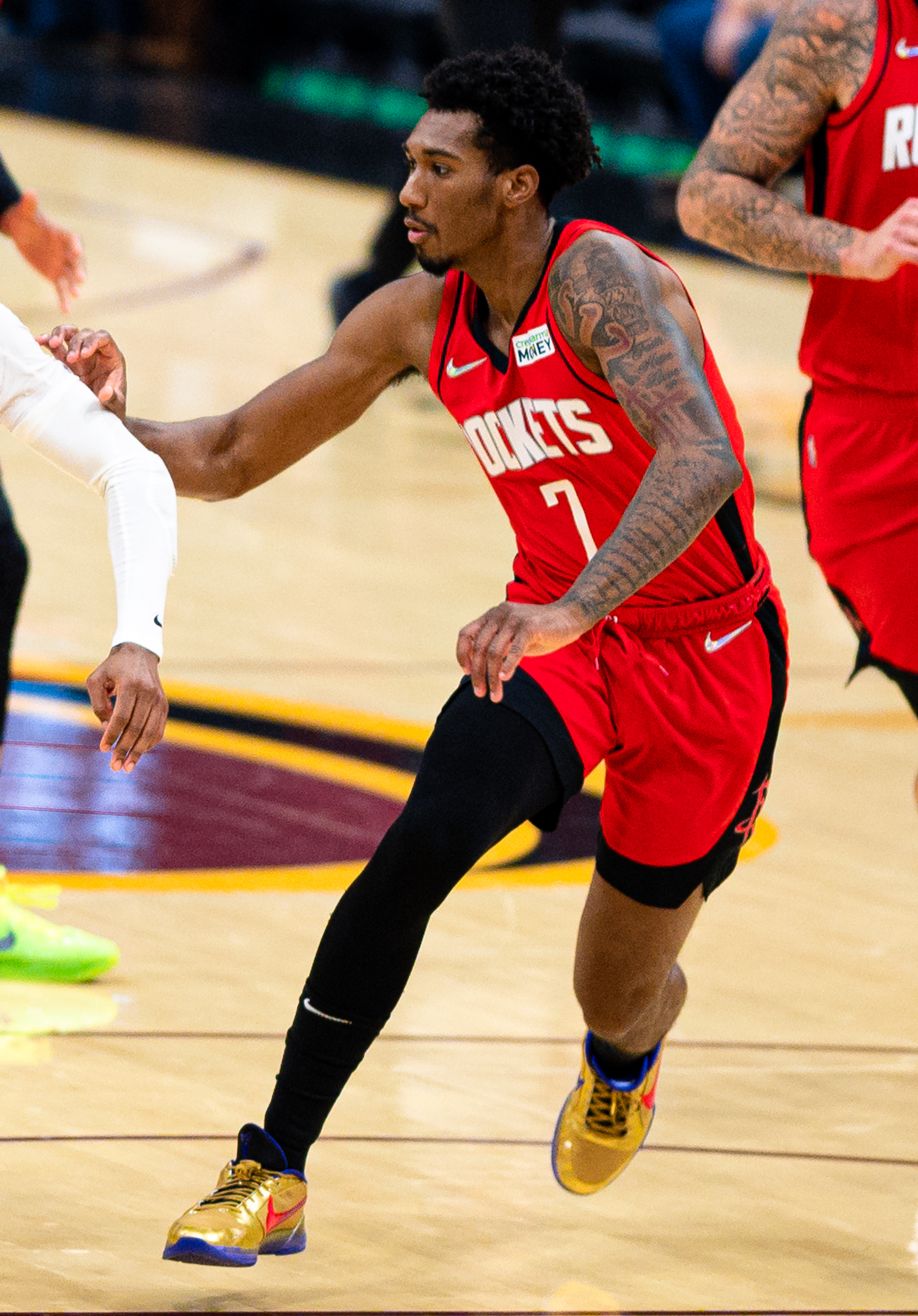
Brooks with the Houston Rockets in 2021

On April 3, 2021, Brooks signed a two-way contract with the Vipers' NBA affiliate, the Houston Rockets. He scored a career-high 24 points in a May 12 loss to the Los Angeles Lakers.

On August 27, 2021, Brooks re-signed with the Rockets on a four-year contract. He was waived on February 10, 2022.

=== Return to College Park (2022) ===
On February 27, 2022, Brooks was re-acquired by the College Park Skyhawks.

=== Toronto Raptors (2022) ===
On March 6, 2022, Brooks signed a 10-day contract with the Toronto Raptors. On March 16, he signed a second 10-day contract. On March 26, he signed a two-year deal with the Raptors. He was waived on July 30, 2022.

=== Third stint with College Park (2022–2023) ===
On November 4, 2022, Brooks was named to the opening roster for the College Park Skyhawks.

=== Brooklyn / Long Island Nets (2023–2024) ===
On July 18, 2023, Brooks signed a two-way contract with the Brooklyn Nets. On January 6, 2024, he was waived by Brooklyn.

=== Ontario Clippers (2024) ===
On January 13, 2024, Brooks joined the Ontario Clippers.

=== Olimpia Milano (2024–2026) ===
On June 19, 2024, Brooks signed with Olimpia Milano of the Lega Basket Serie A. On May 14, 2026, Brooks was named Lega Serie A MVP for the 2025–26 season.

=== ASVEL (2026–present) ===
On July 3, 2026, Brooks signed a two–year contract with ASVEL of the French LNB Élite and the EuroLeague.

==== Loan to Valencia (2026–present) ====
On August 3, 2026, Brooks was loaned to Valencia Basket of the Spanish Liga ACB.

== Career statistics ==
Legend
GP	Games played	GS	Games started	MPG	Minutes per game
FG%	Field goal percentage	3P%	3-point field goal percentage	FT%	Free throw percentage
RPG	Rebounds per game	APG	Assists per game	SPG	Steals per game
BPG	Blocks per game	PPG	Points per game	**Bold**	Career high

=== NBA ===
==== Regular season ====
Year	Team	GP	GS	MPG	FG%	3P%	FT%	RPG	APG	SPG	BPG	PPG
2020–21	Houston	20	5	**26.0**	**.406**	**.382**	.583	**3.4**	**1.5**	**.6**	**.3**	**11.2**
2021–22	Houston	**41**	**8**	16.8	.347	.300	.842	2.0	1.2	.5	.2	6.2
2021–22	Toronto	13	3	11.8	.289	.278	**1.000**	1.7	1.0	.5	.2	2.6
2023–24	Brooklyn	10	0	10.4	.326	.344	.500	1.8	.5	.1	.1	4.2
Career		84	16	17.5	.362	.331	.743	2.3	1.2	.5	.2	6.6

==== Playoffs ====
Year	Team	GP	GS	MPG	FG%	3P%	FT%	RPG	APG	SPG	BPG	PPG
2022	Toronto	4	0	2.0	.000	.000	—	.5	.0	.0	.0	.0
Career		4	0	2.0	.000	.000	—	.5	.0	.0	.0	.0

=== College ===
Year	Team	GP	GS	MPG	FG%	3P%	FT%	RPG	APG	SPG	BPG	PPG
2016–17	Houston	28	3	12.2	**.433**	.362	.800	2.3	.3	.4	.1	4.4
2017–18	Houston	35	1	20.1	.425	**.419**	**.815**	3.7	.5	.7	**.3**	9.3
2018–19	Houston	**37**	**36**	**30.7**	.405	.390	.630	**6.3**	**.9**	**.8**	**.3**	**13.4**
Career		100	40	21.8	.415	.397	.711	4.3	.6	.7	.3	9.4
