= 2025 Italian Basketball Supercup =

2025 Frecciarossa Supercoppa
Tournament details
- Arena: Unipol Forum; Milan, Lombardy, Italy
- Dates: 27–28 September 2025

Final positions
- Champions: Olimpia Milano (6th title)
- Runners-up: Germani Brescia

Awards and statistics
- MVP: (United Kingdom) Quinn Ellis

The 2025 Italian Basketball Supercup (Italian: Supercoppa di pallacanestro 2025), also known as Frecciarossa Supercoppa 2025 for sponsorship reasons, is the 31st edition of the super cup tournament, organized by the Lega Basket Serie A (LBA). The title was won by Olimpia Milano, which defeated 90–76 Germani Brescia, winning the title for the 6th time.

== Participant teams ==
Team	Home city	Head coach
EA7 Emporio Armani Milano	Milan	(Italy) Ettore Messina
Dolomiti Energia Trento	Trent	(Italy) Massimo Cancellieri
Germani Brescia	Brescia	(Italy) Matteo Cotelli
Virtus Segafredo Bologna	Bologna	(Montenegro) Dusko Ivanovic

== Final Four ==
Semifinals; 27 September
1	Dolomiti Energia Trento	75
4	Germani Brescia	88
2	Virtus Bologna	86
3	Olimpia Milano	93

Final; 28 September
1	Germani Brescia	76
2	Olimpia Milano	90

== Semifinals ==
=== Dolomiti Energia Trento vs. Germani Brescia ===
27 September 2025	Dolomiti Energia Trento	75–88	Germani Brescia	Milan
18:00 (CEST)	Scoring by quarter: 26–20, 19–12, 14–30, 16–26
	Pts: Steward 17; Rebs: Bayehe, Mawugbe 5 Asts: Steward 8	Boxscore	Pts: Burnell 21; Rebs: Bilan 8 Asts: Burnell 5	Arena: Unipol Forum; Referees: Mazzoni, Baldini, Valzani

=== Virtus Bologna vs. Olimpia Milano ===
27 September 2025	Virtus Bologna	86–93(OT)	Olimpia Milano	Milan
20:45 (CEST)	Scoring by quarter: 22–20, 23–22, 19–17, 19–24, Overtime: 3–10
	Pts: Edwards 21; Rebs: Pajola 7 Asts: Pajola 6	Boxscore	Pts: Shields 23; Rebs: Bolmaro 12; Asts: Ellis 5	Arena: Unipol Forum; Referees: Rossi, Grigioni, Quarta

== Final ==
=== Germani Brescia vs. Olimpia Milano ===
28 September 2025	Germani Brescia	76–90	Olimpia Milano	Milan
18:00 (CEST)	Scoring by quarter: 24–28, 20–19, 11–22, 21–21
	Pts: Burnell, Massinburg 14; Rebs: Burnell 5 Asts: Burnell 5	Boxscore	Pts: Nebo 18; Rebs: Nebo 7 Asts: Brown 11	Arena: Unipol Forum; Referees: Mazzoni, Grigioni, Valzani

2025 Italian Supercup champions
Olimpia Milano
6th title
