= 2025–26 LBA season =

Italian professional basketball season

LBA
- League: Lega Basket Serie A
- Season: 2025–2026
- Dates: 4 October 2025 – 18 June 2026
- Teams: 15

Regular season
- Season MVP: (United States) Armoni Brooks

Finals
- Champions: Olimpia Milano (32nd title)
- Runners-up: Reyer Venezia
- Finals MVP: (United States) Armoni Brooks

Statistical leaders
Points	(United States) Jahmi'us Ramsey	19.3
Rebounds	(Croatia) Miro Bilan	9.2
Assists	(United States) Desure Buie	6.8

Lega Basket Serie A seasons
- ← 2024–25 2026–27 →

The 2025–26 LBA season was the 104th season of the Lega Basket Serie A (LBA), the men's top tier professional basketball division of the Italian basketball league system.

It began on October 4, 2025, and Virtus Bologna were the defending champions.

== Teams ==
Number of teams	Region	Team(s)
5	Lombardy	Olimpia Milano; Pallacanestro Brescia; Pallacanestro Cantù; Pallacanestro Varese; Vanoli Cremona
2	Emilia-Romagna	Pallacanestro Reggiana; Virtus Bologna
2	Friuli-Venezia Giulia	Pallacanestro Trieste; APU Udine
2	Veneto	Universo Treviso Basket; Reyer Venezia
1	Campania	Napoli Basket
1	Piedmont	Derthona Basket
1	Sardinia	Dinamo Sassari
1	Trentino-Alto Adige/Südtirol	Aquila Basket Trento
1	Sicily	~~Trapani Shark~~ (Note: Trapani Shark were excluded from the league in January 2026, with all games played by the team being cancelled.)

Location of teams in 2025–26 LBA season

Team	Home city	Arena	Capacity	2024–25 result
Dinamo Sassari	Sassari	PalaSerradimigni	5,000	10th
Derthona Basket	Tortona	PalaFerraris	3,510	9th
Aquila Basket Trento	Trento	PalaTrento	4,360	5th
Olimpia Milano	Milan	Forum di Milano	12,331	4th
APU Udine	Udine	PalaCarnera	3,850	promoted to LBA
Pallacanestro Brescia	Brescia	PalaLeonessa	5,200	2nd
Pallacanestro Cantù	Cantù	PalaDesio	6,700	promoted to LBA
Napoli Basket	Naples	PalaBarbuto	5,500	14th
Universo Treviso Basket	Treviso	PalaVerde	5,134	11th
Pallacanestro Varese	Varese	Palasport Lino Oldrini	5,107	12th
Pallacanestro Trieste 2004	Trieste	PalaTrieste	6,943	6th
~~Trapani Shark~~	~~Trapani~~	~~Palallio~~	~~4,575~~	~~3rd~~
Reyer Venezia	Venice	Palasport Taliercio	3,506	8th
Pallacanestro Reggiana	Reggio Emilia	PalaBigi	4,530	7th
Vanoli Cremona	Cremona	PalaRadi	3,519	13th
Virtus Bologna	Bologna	Virtus Arena	9,980	1st

== Regular season ==
In the regular season, teams play against each other home-and-away in a round-robin format. The matchdays are from 4 October 2025 to 10 May 2026.

Points scored in overtime counts toward tiebreakers. Tiebreakers are based on articule 62 of Regolamento Esecutivo Gare.

Pos	Team	Pld	W	L	PF	PA	PD	Pts	Qualification
1	Virtus Bologna	28	23	5	2419	2212	+207	46	Qualification to Playoffs
2	Pallacanestro Brescia	28	21	7	2493	2351	+142	42	Qualification to Playoffs
3	Olimpia Milano	28	20	8	2434	2247	+187	40	Qualification to Playoffs
4	Reyer Venezia	28	19	9	2522	2381	+141	38	Qualification to Playoffs
5	Derthona Tortona	28	17	11	2418	2375	+43	34	Qualification to Playoffs
6	Pallacanestro Reggiana	28	15	13	2347	2245	+102	30	Qualification to Playoffs
7	Pallacanestro Trieste 2004	28	13	15	2350	2443	−93	26	Qualification to Playoffs
8	Aquila Basket Trento	28	12	16	2378	2371	+7	24 (Note: Trento 169-152 Varese)	Qualification to Playoffs
9	Pallacanestro Varese	28	12	16	2355	2460	−105	24	
10	Napoli Basket	28	11	17	2366	2424	−58	22 (Note: Napoli 183-164 Cremona)	
11	Vanoli Basket Cremona	28	11	17	2307	2402	−95	22	
12	Universo Treviso Basket	28	10	18	2341	2494	−153	20 (Note: Treviso 171-168 Udine)	
13	APU Udine	28	10	18	2280	2340	−60	20	
14	Pallacanestro Cantù	28	9	19	2369	2486	−117	18	
15	Dinamo Sassari	28	7	21	2373	2521	−148	14	Relegation to Serie A2

Updated to match(es) played on 10 May 2026. Source: LBA

=== Results ===
Home \ Away	BOL	BRE	CAN	CRE	MIL	NAP	REG	SAS	TNT	TOR	~~TRA~~	TRI	TRV	UDI	VAR	VEN
Bologna	—	86–76	89–79	69–86	104–94	105–88	80–78	90–71	85–87	92–77	~~20-0~~	95–81	88–77	90–86	104–85	82–86
Brescia	79–87	—	104–94	83–72	98–92	100–85	92–101	92–71	72–63	92–86	~~canc.~~	98–75	90–99	83–80	102–94	104–93
Cantù	77–89	71–76	—	91–83	89–94	94–77	83–78	80–78	108–91	79–85	~~63-81~~	97–76	72–80	90–85	100–96	81–86
Cremona	74–84	78–79	89–87	—	67–86	88–81	71–67	79–75	92–83	71–76	~~canc.~~	113–94	96–79	82–73	79–87	88–111
Milano	74–63	81–90	88–86	91–74	—	125–97	80–76	99–87	94–90	71–74	~~80-86~~	86–78	87–63	85–84	74–84	101–88
Napoli	71–90	72–85	98–86	102–76	71–77	—	95–87	86–75	84–74	76–82	~~90-97~~	79–84	88–71	98–71	104–75	64–79
Reggiana	84–70	87–93	78–79	96–78	61–93	91–80	—	90–68	77–68	88–69	~~canc.~~	97–61	88–89	76–71	103–79	79–89
Sassari	73–80	93–86	100–84	104–86	72–76	78–84	99–102	—	89–88	82–89	~~102-78~~	85–80	103–108	70–88	102–105	79–98
Trento	83–102	77–85	109–69	85–94	84–74	87–93	82–90	96–99	—	89–75	~~canc.~~	89–87	81–68	75–82	84–78	96–90
Tortona	69–74	88–80	100–73	85–78	78–87	87–76	81–67	118–113	103–84	—	~~108-100~~	104–99	107–95	79–80	90–87	90–98
~~Trapani~~	~~canc.~~	~~77-75~~	~~canc.~~	~~96-90~~	~~canc.~~	~~canc.~~	~~88-75~~	~~canc.~~	~~11-28~~	~~canc.~~	—	~~canc.~~	~~canc.~~	~~91-73~~	~~88-95~~	~~109-102~~
Trieste	66–74	82–86	84–79	89–94	86–82	110–84	92–82	76–70	84–78	91–81	~~87-91~~	—	84–76	92–85	90–89	78–84
Treviso	79–101	100–102	86–81	97–94	71–76	79–86	78–77	89–92	67–88	91–86	~~82-89~~	100–107	—	92–82	86–83	90–91
Udine	80–82	72–81	95–83	82–75	86–83	78–71	85–90	92–79	69–76	90–94	~~canc.~~	70–89	86–79	—	81–92	87–94
Varese	77–83	98–96	91–82	84–75	61–94	84–80	61–76	91–90	74–85	97–87	~~canc.~~	84–69	91–86	59–66	—	94–106
Venezia	75–81	74–89	101–95	82–75	85–90	106–96	79–81	89–76	87–106	75–78	~~canc.~~	102–66	87–66	101–94	86–75	—

Source: LBA
Legend: Blue = home team win; Red = away team win.
Matches with lighter background shading were decided after overtime.

== Playoffs ==
Teams in bold advanced to the next round. The numbers to the left of each team indicate the team's seeding, the numbers to the right indicate the result of the series including result in bold of the team that won in that series.

Playoffs are played in 2-2-1 format where better seeded hosts first, second and fifth game while worse seeded host third and fourth game.

Quarterfinals
1	**Virtus Bologna**	**3**
8	Aquila Basket Trento	2
4	**Reyer Venezia**	**3**
5	Derthona Tortona	2
2	**Pallacanestro Brescia**	**3**
7	Pallacanestro Trieste	2
3	**Olimpia Milano**	**3**
6	Pallacanestro Reggiana	0

Semifinals
1	Virtus Bologna	1
4	**Reyer Venezia**	**3**
2	Pallacanestro Brescia	1
3	**Olimpia Milano**	**3**

Finals
4	Reyer Venezia	1
3	**Olimpia Milano**	**3**

=== Quarterfinals ===
Team 1	Series	Team 2	Game 1	Game 2	Game 3	Game 4	Game 5
**Virtus Bologna**	**3**–2	Aquila Basket Trento	**102**–71	84–**87**	85–**102**	**90**–81	**106**–95
**Reyer Venezia**	**3**–2	Derthona Tortona	**89**–82	**87**–75	71–**82**	71–**89**	**89**–83
**Pallacanestro Brescia**	**3**–2	Pallacanestro Trieste	90–**92**	**90**–82	**84**–80	77–**83**	**90**–75
**Olimpia Milano**	**3**–0	Pallacanestro Reggiana	**96**–84	**77**–65	**84**–72	–	–

=== Semifinals ===
Team 1	Series	Team 2	Game 1	Game 2	Game 3	Game 4	Game 5
Virtus Bologna	1–**3**	**Reyer Venezia**	83–**91**	**98**–79	85–**89**	83–**90**	–
Pallacanestro Brescia	1–**3**	**Olimpia Milano**	72–**88**	**85**–79	68–**93**	86–**91**	–

=== Finals ===
Team 1	Series	Team 2	Game 1	Game 2	Game 3	Game 4	Game 5
**Olimpia Milano**	**3**–1	Reyer Venezia	**100**−80	**92**−79	97−**109**	**86**−72	–

=== Game 1 ===
11 June 2026	**EA7 Emporio Armani Milano**	**100**–80	Umana Reyer Venezia	Assago
20:00 (CET)	Scoring by quarter: **24**−15, **30**−22, 25−25, **21**−18
	Pts: Diop 18; Rebs: Nebo 7 Asts: Ellis 7	Boxscore	Pts: Tessitori 26; Rebs: Parks 9 Asts: Bowman 4	Arena: Unipol Forum; Attendance: 10,525; Referees: Giovannetti, Grigioni, Gonella

=== Game 2 ===
13 June 2026	**EA7 Emporio Armani Milano**	**92**–79	Umana Reyer Venezia	Assago
20:00 (CET)	Scoring by quarter: **31**−22, **31**−17, 18−**25**, 12−**15**
	Pts: Brooks 19; Rebs: three players 6 Asts: Shields 8	Boxscore	Pts: Wiltjer 19; Rebs: Tessitori 11; Asts: Cole 5	Arena: Unipol Forum; Attendance: 12,300; Referees: Attard, Sahin, Valzani

=== Game 3 ===
16 June 2026	**Umana Reyer Venezia**	**109**–97	EA7 Emporio Armani Milano	Mestre
20:00 (CET)	Scoring by quarter: 25−**26**, **25**−24, **36**−19, 23−**28**
	Pts: Parks 22; Rebs: Tessitori 11; Asts: Bowman, Cole 5	Boxscore	Pts: Brooks 22; Rebs: Nebo 7 Asts: Gudurić 8	Arena: Palasport Giuseppe Taliercio; Referees: Lanzarini, Lo Guzzo, Perciavalle

=== Game 4 ===
18 June 2026	Umana Reyer Venezia	72–**86**	**EA7 Emporio Armani Milano**	Mestre
20:00 (CET)	Scoring by quarter: **20**−19, 20−**26**, 16−**23**, 16−**18**
	Pts: Cole 17; Rebs: Tessitori 10; Asts: Cole 5	Boxscore	Pts: Brooks, Gudurić 15; Rebs: Nebo 8 Asts: Ellis 5	Arena: Palasport Giuseppe Taliercio; Referees: Rossi, Baldini, Quarta

== Awards ==
Pos.	Player	Team	Ref.
Lega Serie A MVP
SG	(United States) Armoni Brooks	Olimpia Milano	
Lega Serie A Finals MVP
SG	(United States) Armoni Brooks	Olimpia Milano	
Domestic Player of the Year
SG	(Italy) Amedeo Della Valle	Pallacanestro Brescia	
Best Young Player
SF	(Italy) Saliou Niang	Virtus Bologna	
Top Scorer
SG	(United States) Jahmi'us Ramsey	Pallacanestro Trieste	
Best Defender
PG	(Argentina) Leandro Bolmaro	Olimpia Milano	
Sixth Man of the Year
PF	(United States) Jason Burnell	Pallacanestro Brescia	
Most Improved Player
PG	(Italy) Davide Casarin	Vanoli Cremona	
Coach of the Year
HC	(Greece) Dimitrios Priftis	Pallacanestro Reggiana	
All-Lega Serie A Team
PG	(Armenia) Christian Vital	Derthona Basket	
SG	(Italy) Amedeo Della Valle	Pallacanestro Brescia	
SF	(United States) Armoni Brooks	Olimpia Milano	
PF	(United States) Jahmi'us Ramsey	Pallacanestro Trieste	
C	(Croatia) Miro Bilan	Pallacanestro Brescia	

== Italian clubs in European competitions ==
Team	Competition	Progress
EA7 Emporio Armani Milano	EuroLeague	Regular Season, 14th
Virtus Bologna	EuroLeague	Regular Season, 17th
Reyer Venezia	EuroCup	Playoffs, Eighthfinals
Dolomiti Energia Trento	EuroCup	Playoffs, Quarterfinals
Pallacanestro Trieste	Champions League	Playoffs, Quarterfinals
Trapani Shark	Champions League	Play-ins
Unahotels Reggio Emilia	Champions League	Qualifying rounds
Unahotels Reggio Emilia	FIBA Europe Cup	Playoffs, Quarterfinals
Banco di Sardegna Sassari	FIBA Europe Cup	Second Phase
