= 2024–25 Virtus Bologna season =

Italian basketball club season

Virtus Bologna
2024–25 season
- Owner: Massimo Zanetti
- President: Massimo Zanetti
- Head coach: Duško Ivanović
- Arena: Segafredo Arena
- LBA: Winners
- EuroLeague: 17th
- Italian Cup: Quarterfinalists
- Supercup: Runners-up
- Average home attendance: EuroLeague: 7,792

The 2024–25 season is Virtus Bologna's 96th in existence and the club's 8th consecutive season in the top flight of Italian basketball.

== Kit ==
Supplier: Adidas / Sponsor: Segafredo

Home	Away

== Players ==
=== Current roster ===
Virtus Segafredo Bologna roster
Players
Coaches

Pos.	No.	Nat.	Name	Ht.	Wt.	Age
G/F	00	(France)	Cordinier, Isaïa	1.96 m (6 ft 5 in)	84 kg (185 lb)	29 – 28 November 1996
G/F	3	(Italy)	Belinelli, Marco (C)	1.96 m (6 ft 5 in)	100 kg (220 lb)	40 – 25 March 1986
PG	6	(Italy)	Pajola, Alessandro	1.94 m (6 ft 4 in)	95 kg (209 lb)	26 – 9 November 1999
SF	8	(United States)	Clyburn, Will	2.01 m (6 ft 7 in)	95 kg (209 lb)	36 – 17 May 1990
PG	11	(United States)	Taylor, Brandon	1.78 m (5 ft 10 in)	77 kg (170 lb)	32 – 8 January 1994
PF	21	(Georgia (country))	Shengelia, Tornike	2.06 m (6 ft 9 in)	109 kg (240 lb)	34 – 5 October 1991
G	23	(Italy) (United States)	Hackett, Daniel	1.96 m (6 ft 5 in)	97 kg (214 lb)	38 – 19 December 1987
PG	30	(United States)	Morgan, Matt	1.93 m (6 ft 4 in)	84 kg (185 lb)	28 – 7 November 1997
PF	33	(Italy)	Polonara, Achille	2.03 m (6 ft 8 in)	90 kg (198 lb)	34 – 23 November 1991
C	35	(Italy) (Senegal)	Diouf, Mouhamet	2.08 m (6 ft 10 in)	108 kg (238 lb)	25 – 10 September 2001
C	41	(Croatia)	Žižić, Ante	2.10 m (6 ft 11 in)	121 kg (267 lb)	29 – 4 January 1997
F	45	(Italy) (Democratic Republic of the Congo)	Akele, Nicola	2.03 m (6 ft 8 in)	96 kg (212 lb)	30 – 7 November 1995

Head coach

- (Montenegro) Duško Ivanović

Assistant coach(es)

- (Serbia) Nenad Jakovljević
- (Italy) Daniele Parente
- (Italy) Cristian Fedrigo
- (Italy) Matteo Cassinerio
- (Italy) Andrea Crosariol

Athletic trainer(s)

- (Italy) Matteo Panichi

Legend

- (C) Team captain
- Injured

- Roster
Updated: May 14, 2025

Note: Flags indicate national team eligibility at FIBA-sanctioned events. Players may hold other non-FIBA nationalities not displayed.

=== Depth chart ===
Pos.	Starting 5	Bench 1	Bench 2
C	Mouhamet Diouf	Ante Žižić
PF	Tornike Shengelia	Achille Polonara	Nikola Akele
SF	Will Clyburn	Marco Belinelli
SG	Isaïa Cordinier	Matt Morgan
PG	Alessandro Pajola	Daniel Hackett	Brandon Taylor

(colors: Italian or homegrown players; foreign players; young players)

=== Squad changes ===
==== In ====
No.	Pos.	Nat.	Name	Age	Moving from		Type	Ends	Transfer fee	Date	Source
8	SF	(United States)	Will Clyburn	34	Anadolu Efes S.K.	(Turkey)	2 years	June 2025	Free	20 July 2024	
9	SG	(Italy)	Riccardo Visconti	25	V.L. Pesaro	(Italy)	1 year	June 2025	Free	20 July 2024	
24	PF	(Latvia)	Andrejs Gražulis	30	Aquila Basket Trento	(Italy)	2 years	June 2025	Free	20 July 2024	
30	PG	(United States)	Matt Morgan	26	London Lions	(United Kingdom)	2 years	June 2025	Free	20 July 2024	
35	C	(Italy) (Senegal)	Mouhamet Diouf	22	CB Breogán	(Spain)	2 years	June 2025	Free	20 July 2024	
45	F	(Italy) (Democratic Republic of the Congo)	Nicola Akele	28	Pallacanestro Brescia	(Italy)	2 years	June 2025	Free	20 July 2024	
59	SG	(United States)	Rayjon Tucker	27	Reyer Venezia	(Italy)	1 year	June 2025	Free	27 July 2024	
1	SG	(United States)	Justin Holiday	35	Free agent		3 months	May 2025	Free	1 February 2025	
11	PG	(United States)	Brandon Taylor	31	Básquet Coruña	(Spain)	1 month	June 2025	Free	14 May 2025	

1. In players: Players that signed after the beginning of the season

==== Out ====
No.	Pos.	Nat.	Name	Age	Moving to		Type	Transfer fee	Date	Source
1	SG	(Denmark)	Gabriel Lundberg	29	KK Partizan	(Serbia)	End of contract	Free	1 July 2024	
13	G/F	(Serbia)	Ognjen Dobrić	29	KK Crvena zvezda	(Serbia)	Exit option	Free	1 July 2024	
14	PG	(Italy)	Bruno Mascolo	28	Universo Treviso Basket	(Italy)	Exit option	Free	1 July 2024	
19	G	(Latvia)	Rihards Lomažs	28	Merkezefendi	(Turkey)	End of contract	Free	1 July 2024	
25	F/C	(United States)	Jordan Mickey	27	Qingdao Eagles	(Chile)	End of contract	Free	1 July 2024	
42	C	(United States) (Armenia)	Bryant Dunston	38	BC Žalgiris	(Lithuania)	End of contract	Free	1 July 2024	
55	SF	(Italy)	Awudu Abass	31	Dubai Basketball	(United Arab Emirates)	End of contract	Free	1 July 2024	
15	C	(United States)	Devontae Cacok	28	Free agent		Mutual consent	Free	15 November 2024	
59	SG	(United States)	Rayjon Tucker	27	AEK B.C.	(Greece)	Mutual consent	Free	30 March 2025	
24	PF	(Latvia)	Andrejs Gražulis	31	Joventut Badalona	(Spain)	Loan	Free	1 April 2025	
1	SG	(United States)	Justin Holiday	36	Free agent		End of contract	Free	30 May 2025	

1. Out players: Players that left after the beginning of the season

==== Confirmed ====
No.	Pos.	Nat.	Name	Age	Moving from		Type	Ends	Transfer fee	Date	Source
6	PG	(Italy)	Alessandro Pajola	24	youth team		8 + 2 years	June 2026	Youth system	2015–16	
3	G/F	(Italy)	Marco Belinelli	38	San Antonio Spurs	(United States)	4 + 1 year	June 2025	Free	26 November 2020	
00	SG	(France)	Isaïa Cordinier	27	Nanterre 92	(France)	3 + 1 year	June 2025	Free	6 October 2021	
23	PG	(Italy) (United States)	Daniel Hackett	36	CSKA Moscow	(Russia)	2 years	June 2026	$100,000	3 March 2022	
21	PF	(Georgia (country))	Tornike Shengelia	36	CSKA Moscow	(Russia)	2 years	June 2025	Free	13 September 2022	
33	PF	(Italy)	Achille Polonara	32	BC Žalgiris	(Lithuania)	2 years	June 2025	Free	6 July 2023	
41	C	(Croatia)	Ante Žižić	27	Anadolu Efes S.K.	(Turkey)	2 years	June 2026	Free	31 December 2023	
