= Quinn Ellis =

British basketball player (born 2003)

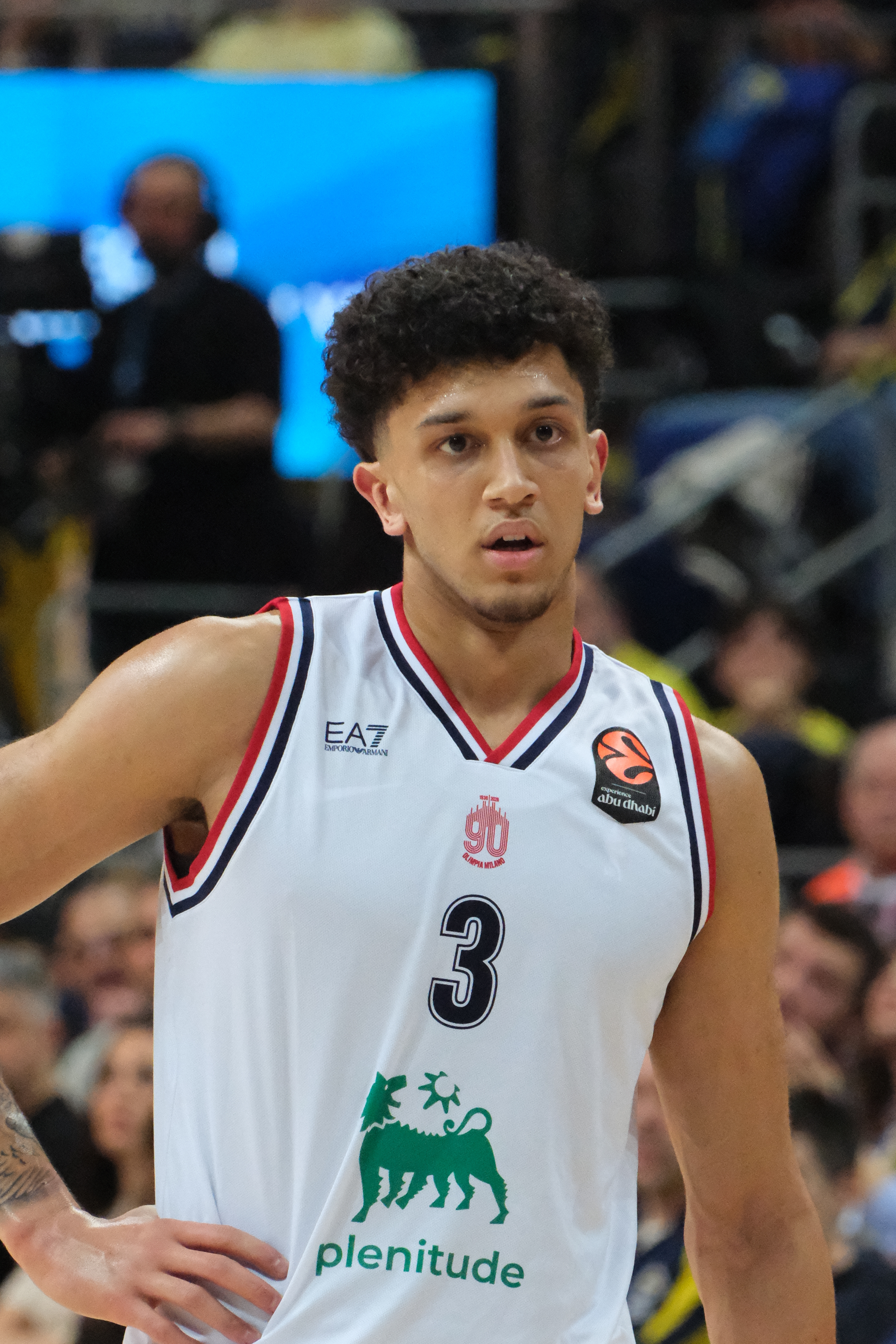
- Ellis with Olimpia Milano in 2026

No. 4 – St. John's Red Storm
- Position: Point guard
- League: Big East Conference

Personal information
- Born: 1 April 2003 (age 23) Sheffield, United Kingdom
- Listed height: 196 cm (6 ft 5 in)
- Listed weight: 92 kg (203 lb)

Career information
- College: St. John's (2026–present)
- Playing career: 2019–present

Career history
- 2019–2022: Orlandina
- 2022–2025: Aquila Trento
- 2022–2023: →JB Casale Monferrato
- 2025–2026: Olimpia Milano

Career highlights
- Lega Serie A champion (2026); 2× Italian Cup winner (2025, 2026); Italian Supercup winner (2025); Lega Serie A Best Young Player (2025); Italian Cup MVP (2025); Italian Supercup MVP (2025)

Quinn Alistair Ellis (born 1 April 2003) is a British college basketball player for the St. John's Red Storm of the Big East Conference. He plays primarily as a point guard or shooting guard.

Ellis began his career in England before moving to Italy at the age of 16, where he advanced through the youth and professional ranks. He played for Italian first division clubs Aquila Basket Trento and Olimpia Milano, competing in the EuroLeague for the latter. While playing for Aquila Basket Trento, he won the Italian league's 2025 Best Player Under 22 Award.

== Early life and youth career ==
Ellis was born in Sheffield, United Kingdom. He comes from a family with basketball history. His grandmother, Betty Cordona, was also a basketball player. Ellis played in the youth system of the Sheffield Sharks until 2019, when he moved to Italy to join the development program of Orlandina Capo d’Orlando.

== Professional career ==
=== Orlandina Capo d’Orlando (2019–2022) ===
Ellis joined the Italian side Orlandina Capo d’Orlando in 2019, progressing through their youth and senior teams during his three seasons with the club.

=== Aquila Basket Trento (2022–2025) ===
In 2022, Ellis signed with Aquila Basket Trento. During the 2022–23 season he was also assigned to JB Casale Monferrato, where he gained additional playing time and experience. Ellis remained with Trento through 2025.

=== Olimpia Milano (2025–2026) ===
Ellis joined Olimpia Milano of the Italian Lega Basket Serie A (LBA) and the EuroLeague.
