= Jamarr Sanders =

American basketball player (born 1988)

Free Agent
- Position: Shooting guard

Personal information
- Born: August 2, 1988 (age 38) Chicago, Illinois, U.S.
- Listed height: 1.93 m (6 ft 4 in)
- Listed weight: 95 kg (209 lb)

Career information
- High school: Jefferson Davis (Montgomery, Alabama)
- College: Alabama State (2007–2008); Northwest Florida State (2008–2009); UAB (2009–2011)
- NBA draft: 2011: undrafted
- Playing career: 2011–present

Career history
- 2011: KAOD
- 2011–2013: Austin Toros
- 2013–2014: Veroli
- 2014–2016: Dolomiti Energia Trento
- 2017–2018: Telekom Baskets Bonn
- 2018–2019: Trieste
- 2019–2020: Gaziantep Basketbol
- 2020–2022: Derthona Basket
- 2022: SIG Strasbourg
- 2022–2023: Tezenis Verona

Career highlights
- First-team All-Conference USA (2011)
- Stats at Basketball Reference

Jamarr Sanders (born August 2, 1988) is an American professional basketball player. He played college basketball for Alabama State, Northwest Florida State College and UAB. As a senior at UAB, Sanders was named to the First Team Conference USA. On December 18, 2016, he signed a one-week tryout with the Italian team.

== Professional career ==
On January 29, 2017, Sanders signed with the German club Telekom Baskets Bonn.

On July 12, 2018, Sanders signed with the Italian club Pallacanestro Trieste.

On July 3, 2019, he has signed 1-year deal with Gaziantep Basketbol of the Turkish Basketbol Süper Ligi.

On January 20, 2020, he signed a deal with the Italian club Derthona Basket. Sanders extended his contract with the team on July 26, 2021.

On September 17, 2022, he has signed with SIG Strasbourg of the French LNB Pro A.

On November 1, 2022, he signed with Tezenis Verona of the LBA.
