= Tornike Shengelia =

Georgian basketball player (born 1991)

Tornike Shengelia თორნიკე შენგელია
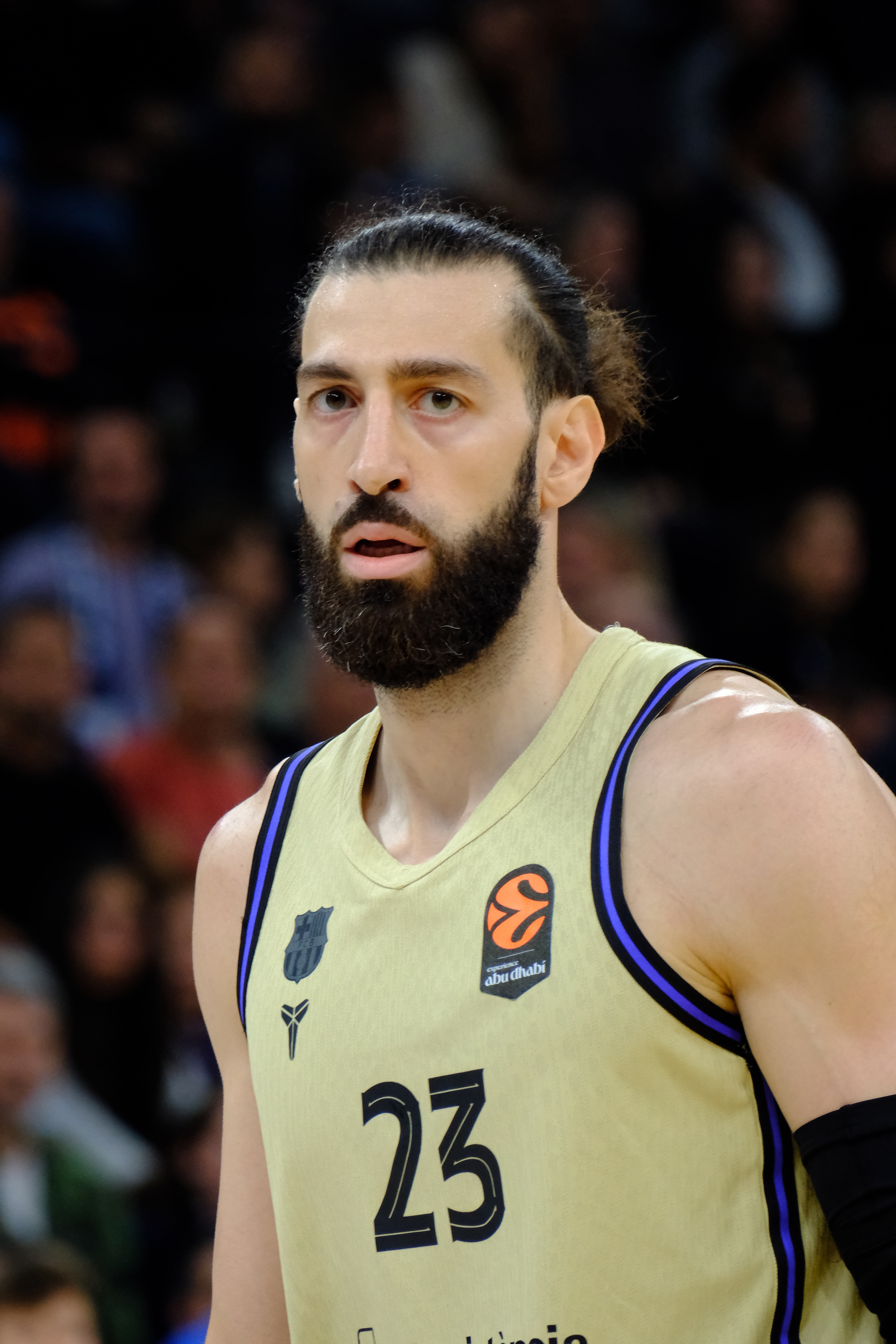
- Shengelia with FC Barcelona in 2025

No. 23 – Dubai Basketball
- Position: Power forward
- League: ABA League; EuroLeague

Personal information
- Born: 5 October 1991 (age 35) Tbilisi, Georgia
- Listed height: 6 ft 9 in (2.06 m)
- Listed weight: 240 lb (109 kg)

Career information
- NBA draft: 2012: 2nd round, 54th overall pick
- Drafted by: Philadelphia 76ers
- Playing career: 2008–present

Career history
- 2008–2010: Valencia
- 2010–2012: Spirou Charleroi
- 2010–2011: →Verviers-Pepinster
- 2012–2014: Brooklyn Nets
- 2012–2014: →Springfield Armor
- 2014: Chicago Bulls
- 2014–2020: Baskonia
- 2020–2022: CSKA Moscow
- 2022–2025: Virtus Bologna
- 2025–2026: FC Barcelona
- 2026–present: Dubai Basketball

Career highlights
- All-EuroLeague First Team (2018); 2× EuroCup champion (2010, 2022); VTB United League champion (2021); VTB United League Supercup winner (2021); Lega Serie A champion (2025); 2× Italian Supercup winner (2022, 2023); Lega Serie A Finals MVP (2025); 2× All-Lega Serie A Team (2024, 2025); Italian Supercup MVP (2023); Liga ACB champion (2020); All-Liga ACB First Team (2018); All-Liga ACB Second Team (2019, 2020); Liga ACB Most Spectacular Player (2019)
- Stats at NBA.com
- Stats at Basketball Reference

Tornike "Toko" Shengelia (Georgian: თორნიკე შენგელია; born 5 October 1991) is a Georgian professional basketball player for Dubai Basketball of the ABA League and the EuroLeague. Shengelia also represents the senior Georgian national team. He earned an All-EuroLeague First Team selection in 2018.

== Professional career ==
=== Early career ===
From 2008 to 2010, Shengelia played for both Valencia Basket and its junior team, Valencia BC Sunny Delight. In 2010, he signed with Spirou Charleroi of Belgium, who later loaned him to VOO Verviers-Pepinster for the 2010–11 season. In August 2011, it was announced that he would play for Spirou Charleroi in 2011–12.

=== Brooklyn Nets (2012–2014) ===
Shengelia was selected with the 54th overall pick in the 2012 NBA draft by Philadelphia 76ers. He was later traded to the Brooklyn Nets on draft night. In July 2012, he joined the Nets for the 2012 NBA Summer League. In 5 games, he averaged 10.2 points and 3.6 rebounds per game.

On July 24, 2012, Shengelia signed with the Nets. During his rookie and sophomore seasons, he had multiple assignments with the Springfield Armor of the NBA D-League.

=== Chicago Bulls (2014) ===
On January 21, 2014, Shengelia was traded to the Chicago Bulls in exchange for Marquis Teague. On April 14, 2014, he was waived by the Bulls.

=== Baskonia (2014–2020) ===
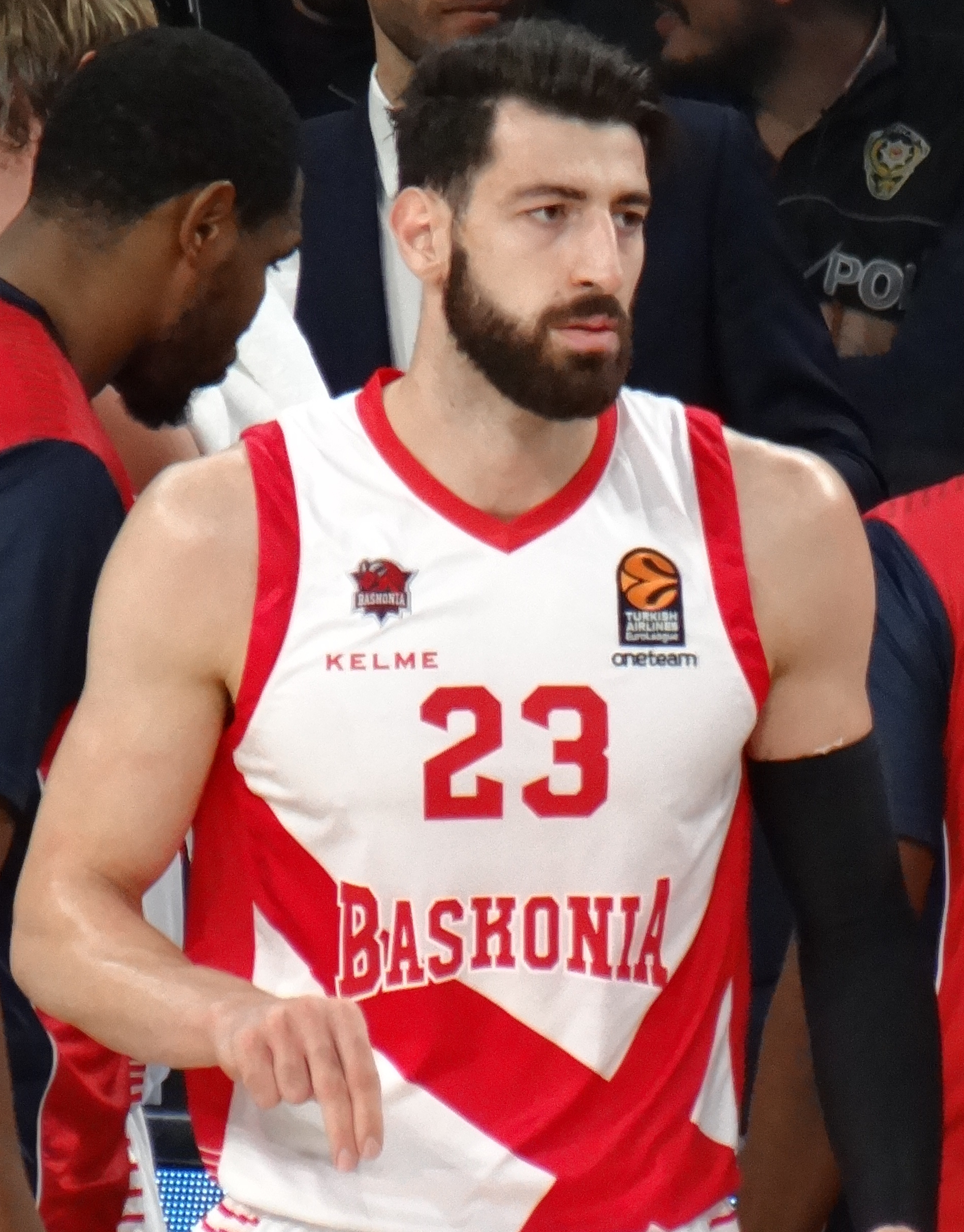
Shengelia with Baskonia in 2017

On June 21, 2014, Shengelia signed a three-year deal with Baskonia.

On March 1, 2015, the Basque derby with Bilbao Basket ended in a brawl that started with a confrontation between Dejan Todorović and Shengelia. Both players were disqualified and 12 players were ejected due to the court invasion that took place during the fight. With mere seconds on the clock and Bilbao leading the game, Shengelia fouled Todorović as the latter attempted a dunk. The Serbian player pushed Shengelia from behind and the Georgian forward threw a punch in response. The exchange prompted the bench players of both teams to enter the court and subsequently started the brawl. When Shengelia was leaving the court after the disqualifying foul, he apologized to a child who was in the first row of the arena.

The ACB announced the brawl would have severe consequences and sanctions and initiated talks with the Spanish Basketball Federation to strengthen disciplinary regulations. On March 5, the league provisionally suspended Todorović and Shengelia until the final resolution of the case.

After the cautionary suspension of both players was announced, Bilbao and Baskonia released a joint statement expressing their disapproval. On March 11, Shengelia would finally receive a 5 game suspension while Todorović was suspended for four games. Additionally, Dairis Bertāns of Bilbao Basket and the brothers Mamadou and Ilimane Diop of Baskonia received a €3,000 fine.

On June 7, 2017, Shengelia signed a three-year contract extension with Baskonia. In May 2018, he was named to the All-EuroLeague First Team for the 2017–18 season. Over 33 EuroLeague games, he averaged career-highs of 13.7 points, 6.1 rebounds and 2.2 assists per game. On 24 May 2018, he finished in second place behind Luka Dončić in voting for the Liga ACB MVP of the season. On August 19, 2018, Shengelia signed a four-year contract extension with Baskonia until 2022. However, the Georgian forward left Baskonia in July 2020, after 6 seasons with the Basque team.

=== CSKA Moscow (2020–2022) ===
On 9 July 2020, he signed a three-year contract with Russian club CSKA Moscow.

On 26 February 2022, Shengelia terminated the contract in protest of Russia's invasion of Ukraine. He said: "I take this decision in protest against Russia's invasion of Ukraine. I do not consider it possible to continue playing for the Red Army club." CSKA's name abbreviates as the Central Sports Club of the Army. The team accused him and others of violating their contracts; however, with Russia being suspended from the Euroleague and FIBA, CSKA cannot pursue any legal action.

=== Virtus Bologna (2022–2025) ===
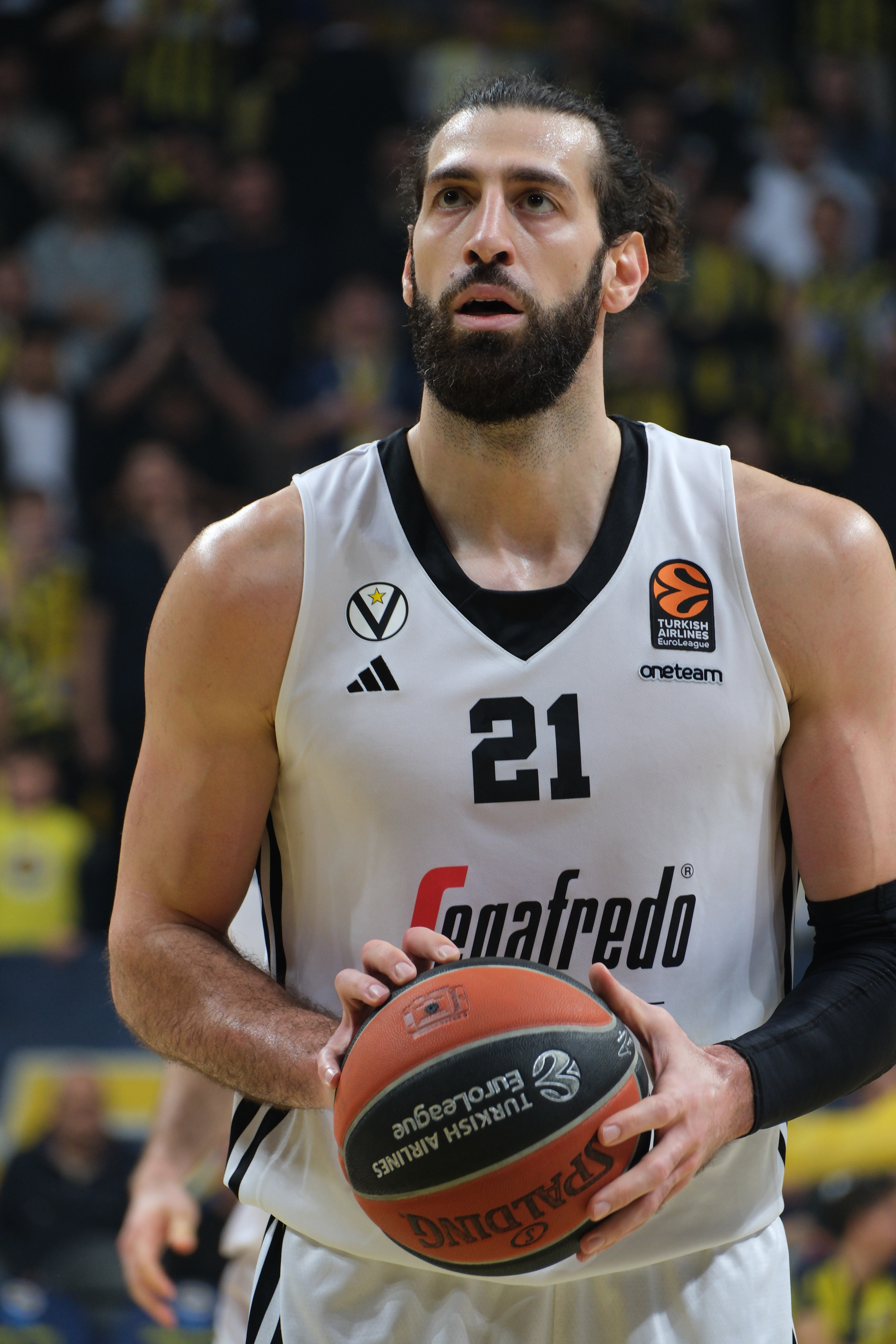
Shengelia with Virtus in 2025

On 7 March 2022, Shengelia signed a deal with the Italian club Virtus Bologna until the end of the season. Moreover, after having ousted Lietkabelis, Ulm and Valencia in the first three rounds of the playoffs, on 11 May 2022, Virtus defeated Frutti Extra Bursaspor by 80–67 at the Segafredo Arena, winning its first EuroCup and qualifying for the EuroLeague after 14 years. However, despite having ended the regular season at the first place and having ousted 3–0 both Pesaro and Tortona in the first two rounds of playoffs, Virtus was defeated 4–2 in the national finals by Olimpia Milano.

On 13 September, Shengelia signed a two-year deal with Virtus until June 2024. On 29 September 2022, after having ousted Milano in the semifinals, Virtus won its third Supercup, defeating 72–69 Banco di Sardegna Sassari and achieving a back-to-back, following the 2021 trophy. However, Shengelia did not play due to a shoulder injury occurred before the 2022 EuroBasket. However, despite good premises Virtus ended the EuroLeague season at the 14th place, thus it did not qualify for the playoffs. Moreover, the team was defeated in the Italian Basketball Cup final by Brescia. In June, after having ousted 3–0 both Brindisi and Tortona, Virtus was defeated 4–3 by Olimpia Milan in the national finals, following a series which was widely regarded among the best in the latest years of Italian basketball.

On 24 September 2023, after having ousted Olimpia Milano in the semifinals, Virtus won its fourth Supercup, and the third in a row, defeating 97–60 Germani Brescia. Shengelia was appointed MVP of the tournament. Despite an impressive first half of the season, Virtus ended the EuroLeague regular season at the 10th place, qualifying only for the play-in, where after having defeated 67–64 Anadolu Efes, it lost against Baskonia 89–77, not qualifying for the playoffs. Moreover, the Black V placed first during the Italian regular season but, after having knocked out Tortona by 3–2 and Reyer Venezia by 3–1, it lost the third consecutive final against Milan by 3–1.

In the 2024-25 EuroLeague season, he scored a career-high 35 points against Fenerbahçe, marking the highest-scoring game of his EuroLeague career. The 2024–25 LBA season was Shengelia's most successful with Virtus, winning the Italian championship. Beating Pallacanestro Brescia in the finals, Shengelia was named LBA Finals MVP. Additionally, he was selected to the season's All-Lega Serie A Team.

=== FC Barcelona (2025–2026) ===
On July 21, 2025, Shengelia signed a three season contract with FC Barcelona of the Liga ACB and EuroLeague. On October 31, 2025, he won his ninth EuroLeague MVP of the Round award after recoding a PIR of 42 during an away win against Partizan Belgrade. On August 6, 2026, Barcelona announced Shengelia had paid his contract's release clause, thus parting ways with the Catalans.

=== Dubai Basketball (2026–present) ===
On the same day, Shengelia signed Dubai Basketball of the ABA League and the EuroLeague.

== National team career ==
Shengelia is a member of the senior Georgian national team. With Georgia, he played at the 2011 EuroBasket, the 2015 EuroBasket, and the 2017 EuroBasket.

In February 2023, Shengelia was a key player on the roster of Georgia that qualified for its first-ever World Cup in 2023.

== Career statistics ==
Legend
GP	Games played	GS	Games started	MPG	Minutes per game
FG%	Field-goal percentage	3P%	3-point field-goal percentage	FT%	Free-throw percentage
RPG	Rebounds per game	APG	Assists per game	SPG	Steals per game
BPG	Blocks per game	PPG	Points per game	PIR	Performance index rating
**Bold**	Career high

=== NBA ===
==== Regular season ====
Year	Team	GP	GS	MPG	FG%	3P%	FT%	RPG	APG	SPG	BPG	PPG
2012–13	Brooklyn	**19**	0	4.9	.435	**.500**	**.563**	**1.2**	.2	**.2**	**.1**	**1.6**
2013–14	Brooklyn	17	0	**8.1**	.458	.000	.375	.8	**.7**	.1	**.1**	1.5
2013–14	Chicago	9	0	1.9	**.500**	.000	.000	.2	.2	.1	.0	.4
Career		45	0	5.5	.451	.125	.500	.9	.4	.1	.1	1.3

=== EuroLeague ===
*	Led the league

Year	Team	GP	GS	MPG	FG%	3P%	FT%	RPG	APG	SPG	BPG	PPG	PIR
2011–12	Charleroi	9	9	20.6	.500	.286	.682	4.3	1.0	.3	.1	8.3	7.1
2014–15	Baskonia	24	23	21.6	.439	.229	.820	4.8	.8	.6	**.7**	9.5	10.3
2015–16	Baskonia	9	7	19.2	.561	.500	.682	3.8	1.2	.8	.6	9.1	10.4
2016–17	Baskonia	24	13	20.8	.511	**.542**	.778	4.1	1.4	.8	.3	10.8	12.0
2017–18	Baskonia	33	17	25.5	**.569**	.326	.681	**6.1**	2.2	.8	.5	13.7	18.2
2018–19	Baskonia	20	15	24.2	.503	.393	.529	4.3	1.6	1.1	.6	11.4	13.0
2019–20	Baskonia	28*	28*	**30.4**	.533	.391	.769	5.6	2.9	1.0	.5	**15.9**	**18.5**
2020–21	CSKA Moscow	**37**	**35**	24.9	.455	.315	.651	4.9	2.3	**1.2**	.2	11.2	12.1
2021–22	CSKA Moscow	15	13	24.8	.474	.341	.733	4.7	2.5	.9	.3	12.7	14.1
2022–23	Virtus Bologna	23	17	22.6	.484	.462	.753	3.1	3.1	.9	.4	9.4	11.5
2023–24	Virtus Bologna	33	31	27.4	.491	.255	.788	5.0	**3.3**	1.0	.2	14.5	17.4
2024–25	Virtus Bologna	28	25	27.7	.513	.362	**.824**	5.0	2.7	.7	.4	15.6	17.5
2025–26	Barcelona	34	29	24.5	.537	.365	.819	4.6	2.6	.8	.3	12.4	15.4
Career		317	262	24.9	.498	.345	.738	4.8	2.3	.9	.4	12.4	14.5

=== Domestic leagues ===
Season	Team	League	GP	MPG	FG%	3P%	FT%	RPG	APG	SPG	BPG	PPG
2008–09	(Spain) Pamesa Valencia	ACB	6	10.5	.620	.000	.800	1.7	.5	.5	.2	3.3
2009–10	(Spain) Pamesa Valencia B	EBA	21	29.5	.539	.290	.481	8.0	1.9	.9	1.0	15.7
2010–11	(Belgium) Verviers-Pepinster	BLB	32	17.0	.511	.130	.750	4.1	.5	.8	.3	6.5
2011–12	(Belgium) Belgacom Spirou	BLB	29	18.4	.494	.279	.628	4.8	1.1	1.1	.3	8.8
2012–13	(United States) Springfield Armor	NBA D-League	10	36.6	.581	.366	.675	8.2	4.0	2.3	1.0	24.3
2013–14	(United States) Springfield Armor	NBA D-League	4	27.3	.615	.200	.818	5.0	1.5	.5	1.3	13.3
2014–15	(Spain) Baskonia	ACB	31	20.3	.532	.362	.804	4.0	1.0	.5	.4	10.1
2015–16	(Spain) Baskonia	ACB	19	17.0	.580	.300	.750	3.6	0.9	.6	.5	8.7
2016–17	(Spain) Baskonia	ACB	31	22.1	.541	.324	.694	4.8	1.3	1.0	.7	10.5
2017–18	(Spain) Baskonia	ACB	41	24.2	.608	.350	.717	5.4	1.7	1.0	.3	14.9
2018–19	(Spain) Baskonia	ACB	25	23.0	.634	.422	.573	4.8	2.4	1.3	.3	13.4
2019–20	(Spain) Baskonia	ACB	29	32.0	.543	.295	.718	6.1	2.8	1.2	.3	15.9
2020–21	(Russia) CSKA Moscow	VTBUL	26	23.3	.573	.294	.656	4.4	1.8	.6	.4	13.9
2021–22	(Russia) CSKA Moscow	VTBUL	9	20.1	.609	.250	.698	4.1	3.1	.8	.4	11.2
2021–22	(Italy) Virtus Bologna	LBA	19	24.3	.560	.250	.632	5.2	2.7	.9	.5	12.8
2022–23	(Italy) Virtus Bologna	LBA	32	24.1	.533	.346	.741	5.9	3.2	1.2	.3	11.5
2023–24	(Italy) Virtus Bologna	LBA	36	23.6	.533	.382	.808	4.9	3.1	.7	.2	13.6
2024–25	(Italy) Virtus Bologna	LBA	35	24.4	.563	.306	.815	5.5	2.8	.7	.5	15.1
2025–26	(Spain) Barcelona	ACB	40	21.8	.530	.164	.768	4.0	2.0	.6	.4	11.2
