= Miro Bilan =

Croatian basketball player

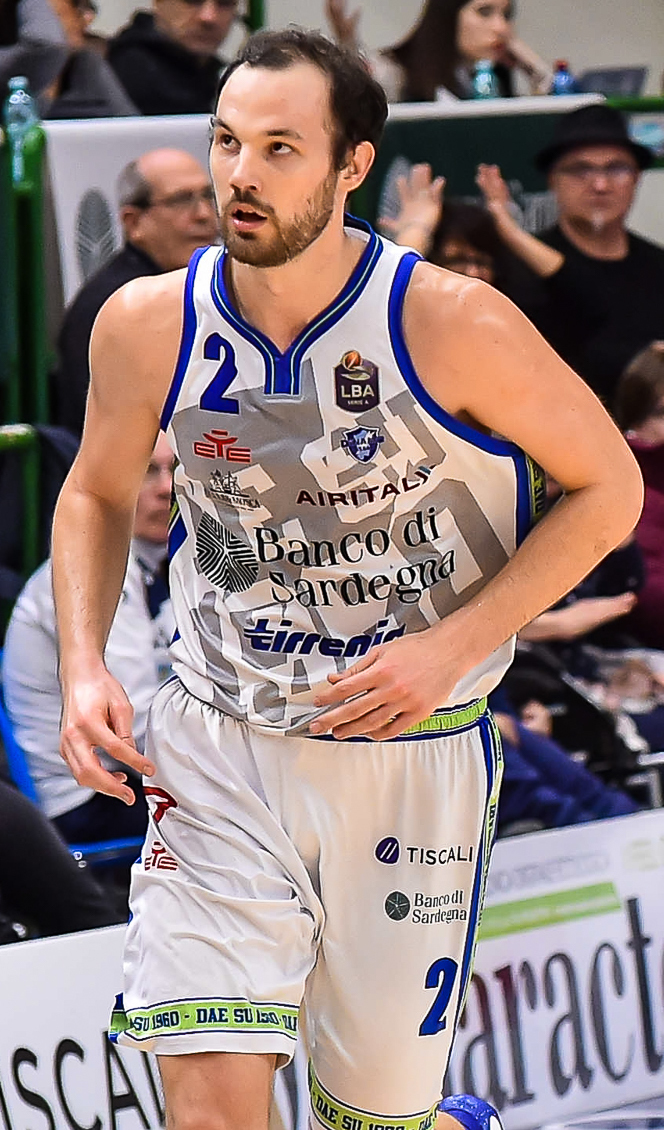
- Bilan with Dinamo Sassari in 2020

No. 2 – Maxima Roma
- Position: Center
- League: LBA; EuroCup

Personal information
- Born: July 21, 1989 (age 37) Šibenik, SR Croatia, SFR Yugoslavia
- Listed height: 2.08 m (6 ft 10 in)
- Listed weight: 121 kg (267 lb)

Career information
- NBA draft: 2011: undrafted
- Playing career: 2006–present

Career history
- 2006–2009: Šibenik
- 2010–2011: Zadar
- 2011–2017: Cedevita
- 2017–2018: SIG Strasbourg
- 2018–2019: ASVEL
- 2019–2021: Dinamo Sassari
- 2021–2022: Prometey
- 2022: Dinamo Sassari
- 2022–2023: Peristeri
- 2023–2026: Brescia
- 2026–present: Maxima Roma

Career highlights
- All-EuroCup Second Team (2019); 4× Croatian League champion (2014–2017); French Pro A League champion (2019); 5× Croatian Cup winner (2012, 2014–2017); 2× French Federation Cup winner (2018, 2019); Italian Supercup winner (2019); Lega Serie A MVP (2025); ABA League MVP (2016); 4× All-Lega Serie A Team (2021, 2024–2026); 2× All-ABA League Team (2016, 2017); 2× Lega Serie A rebounding leader (2024, 2026); Greek League rebounding leader (2023); Croatian Cup MVP (2017)

Miro Bilan (born July 21, 1989) is a Croatian professional basketball player for Maxima Roma of the Italian Lega Basket Serie A (LBA) and the EuroCup. Standing at 7 ft 0 in (2.13 m), he plays at the center position.

== Professional career ==
Bilan started his career in his hometown, playing for Šibenik from the start of 2006 until January 2010 season when he signed 3 year-deal for Zadar. In Zadar Bilan proved to be one of the most promising young centers in Croatia, becoming subject of interest from major clubs. As Zadar fell into financial troubles, failing to pay their players on time, Bilan one-sidedly parted ways with the team.

In August 2011, he signed a contract with Cedevita. Zadar suspended Bilan but eventually he won Croatian Basketball Federation arbitration dispute, allowing him to debut for Cedevita in September 2011. In July 2014, he extended his contract with Cedevita for one more season.

On May 5, 2015, he agreed to a new two-year contract with Cedevita. The 2015–16 season was until then his most successful season. He was one of Cedevita's key players in its EuroLeague Top 16 run and was named ABA League MVP. In spite rumors he will continue his career abroad, in July 2016 he signed a new one-year contract with Cedevita.

On October 19, 2017, Bilan signed with French club SIG Strasbourg for the rest of the 2017–18 season. In 35 games in LNB Pro A he averaged 13 points, 6.4 rebound and 2.1 assists in 23.2 minutes per game. In 16 games in Basketball Champions League he averaged 10.3 points, 6.4 rebounds and 1 assist in 22.7 minutes per game.

On July 30, 2018, Bilan signed with French club ASVEL. In 44 games in LNB Pro A he averaged 11.5 points, 5.9 rebounds and 1.6 assists in 22.3 minutes per game. In 18 EuroCup games he averaged 10.6 points, 6.1 rebounds and 1.1 assists in 21.3 minutes per game. He was named member of the All–7DAYS EuroCup Second Team for the 2018/19 season.

On July 13, 2019, he has signed with Dinamo Sassari of the Lega Basket Serie A (LBA). In 2019/2020 season he averaged 14 points, 6.4 rebounds and 1.6 assists in 25 minutes per game. In 2020/2021 season he averaged 16.5 points, 7.9 rebounds and 1.9 assists in 27 minutes per game, earning Lega Basket Seria A (LBA) first team award.

On September 23, 2021, he signed in Ukraine with BC Prometey. In 23 games, Bilan averaged 10.3 points, 7.1 rebounds, and 1.6 assists in 18:54 minutes per game.

On March 7, 2022, he signed back with Dinamo Sassari of the Lega Basket Serie A (LBA). In 18 games he averaged 15.6 points, 8.1 rebounds, and 1.6 assists in 24.6 minutes per game.

On June 25, 2022, Bilan signed with Peristeri of the Greek Basket League. In 32 domestic league games, he averaged 12.6 points, 8.3 rebounds and 1.6 assists, playing around 24 minutes per contest.

On June 19, 2023, Bilan signed a two-year contract with Italian club Brescia of the Lega Basket Serie A. In 39 games, he averaged 12.4 points, 8.3 rebounds and 2.8 assists, playing 24.6 minutes per game.

On August 5, 2026, Bilan signed a two-year contract with Maxima Roma of the Italian Lega Basket Serie A (LBA).

== National team career ==
Bilan was a part of the Croatian U-18 and U-20 teams as well as Croatian B national side. He made his debut for the senior Croatian national basketball team in August 2014 in a friendly against Canada. He was the last player to be removed from the preliminary squad for the 2014 World Cup. He represented Croatia at the 2015 EuroBasket, where they were eliminated in the eighth finals by Czech Republic. At this tournament he was the third choice for the center position and did not spend much time on court. A year later, after Ante Tomić and Justin Hamilton canceled playing in the tournament, he became the first-choice center in Croatia's successful appearance at the 2016 FIBA World Olympic Qualifying Tournament. He played at the 2016 Summer Olympics where Croatia came 5th. He rejected the call-up for the 2017 EuroBasket, but played again for the Croatia national basketball team at the 2019 FIBA Basketball World Cup qualification games.

== Career statistics ==
Legend
GP	Games played	GS	Games started	MPG	Minutes per game
FG%	Field-goal percentage	3P%	3-point field-goal percentage	FT%	Free-throw percentage
RPG	Rebounds per game	APG	Assists per game	SPG	Steals per game
BPG	Blocks per game	PPG	Points per game	PIR	Performance index rating
**Bold**	Career high

=== EuroLeague ===
Year	Team	GP	GS	MPG	FG%	3P%	FT%	RPG	APG	SPG	BPG	PPG	PIR
2012–13	Cedevita	9	8	19.1	**.596**	.000	.500	6.0	.3	.3	.2	8.8	11.4
2014–15	Cedevita	10	10	25.3	.549	.000	**.714**	**6.6**	1.2	.4	.0	12.5	15.4
2015–16	Cedevita	**24**	**24**	**25.6**	.554	**.333**	.625	6.1	**2.0**	**.7**	**.3**	**13.1**	**15.5**
Career		43	42	24.2	.561	.300	.628	6.2	1.5	.5	.2	12.2	14.6
