= Jason Burnell =

American basketball player (born 1997)

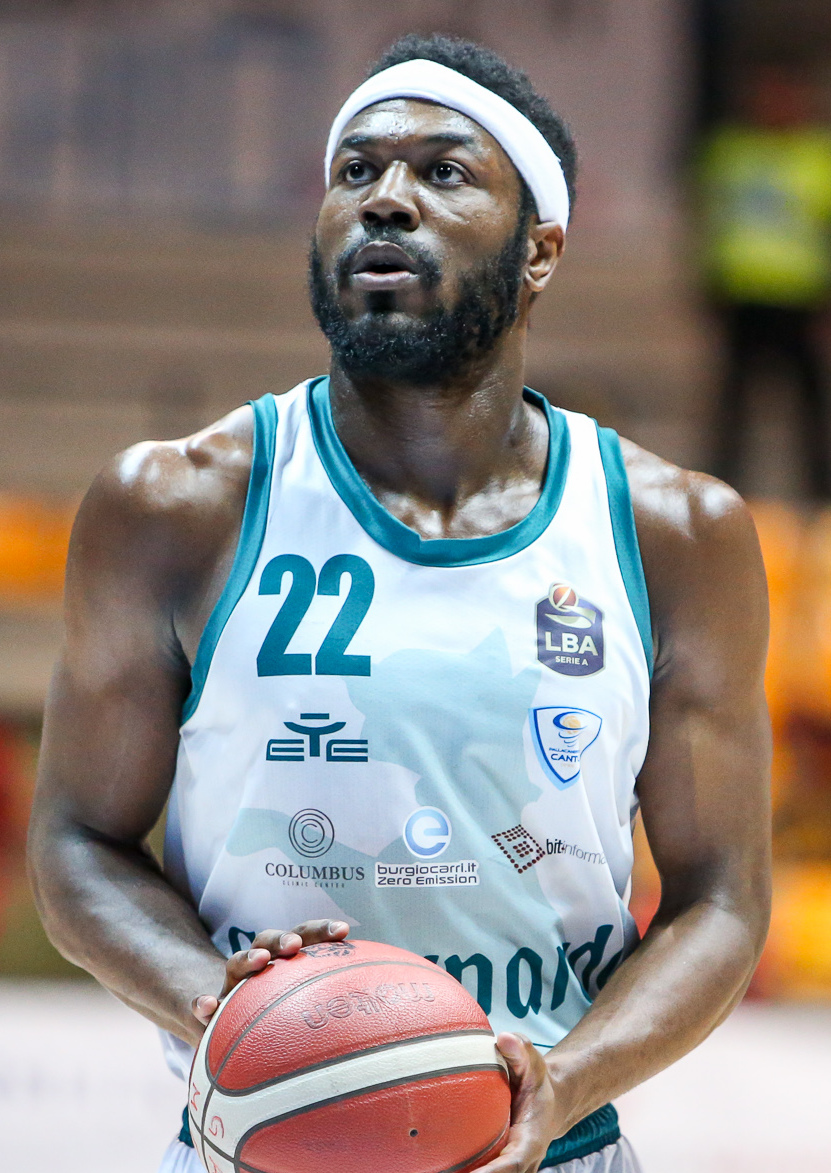
- Burnell with Cantù in 2020

No. 0 – Olimpia Milano
- Position: Power forward
- League: LBA; Euroleague

Personal information
- Born: August 15, 1997 (age 29) DeLand, Florida, U.S.
- Listed height: 2.01 m (6 ft 7 in)
- Listed weight: 100 kg (220 lb)

Career information
- High school: DeLand (DeLand, Florida); Providence School (Jacksonville, Florida)
- College: Georgia Southern (2015–2016); St. Petersburg College (2016–2017); Jacksonville State (2017–2019)
- NBA draft: 2019: undrafted
- Playing career: 2019–present

Career history
- 2019–2020: Cantù
- 2020–2022: Dinamo Sassari
- 2022–2023: New Basket Brindisi
- 2023–2026: Brescia
- 2026–present: Olimpia Milano

Career highlights
- Lega Serie A Sixth Man of the Year (2026); First-team All-OVC (2019)

Jason Scott Burnell (born August 15, 1997) is an American professional basketball player who plays for Olimpia Milano of the Italian Lega Basket Serie A (LBA) and the EuroLeague. He played college basketball for Jacksonville State.

== Early life ==
Burnell grew up in DeLand, Florida and originally attended DeLand High School. As a junior, he averaged 22 points and 10 rebounds per game for the Bulldogs and was named the Player of the Year by The Daytona Beach News-Journal. He opted to transfer to the Providence School in Jacksonville, Florida before his senior year in order to be closer to his father.

== College career ==
=== Georgia Southern ===
Burnell started his collegiate career at Georgia Southern University and averaged 2.9 points per game in 24 appearances for the Eagles as a freshman before deciding to leave the program at the end of the season due to lack of playing time.

=== St. Petersburg ===
After leaving Georgia Southern, Burnell enrolled at St. Petersburg College. He led the Titans with 20.1 points, 10.9 rebounds, and 1.4 blocks per game and was named the FCSAA State Tournament MVP, First Team All-State, State of Florida Player of the Year and Suncoast Conference Player of the Year.

=== Jacksonville State ===
Burnell played for Jacksonville State for his final two years of collegiate eligibility. In his first season with the team, Burnell averaged 11.2 points per game in 35 games (18 starts) overall, and 12.3 points per game with 116 rebounds and 15 blocks during conference play and was named to the Ohio Valley Conference (OVC) All-Newcomer Team. As a senior, Burrell was named first team All-OVC after averaging 17.2 points per game, 9.6 rebounds and 3.2 assists per game.

== Professional career ==
Burnell signed with Pallacanestro Cantù of the Italian Lega Basket Serie A on July 17, 2019. In his first professional season, Burnell averaged 11.7 points, 5.2 rebounds, 1.5 assists and 1.1 steals in 20 Serie A games.

Burnell signed with Dinamo Sassari on June 6, 2020. He averaged 11.3 points and 6.8 rebounds per game. On July 8, 2021, Burnell re-signed with the team.

On July 20, 2022, he has signed with New Basket Brindisi of the Lega Basket Serie A.
