= 2023 LBA Playoffs =

Tournament details
- Country: Italy
- Dates: 13 May–ongoing
- Teams: 8

The 2023 LBA Playoffs, officially known as the 2023 LBA Playoff UnipolSai, was the postseason tournament of the 2022–23 LBA season, which began on 2 October 2022. The playoffs started on May 13, 2023, with the match Milano–Pesaro. Olimpia Milano are the defending champions, from the season 2021–22.

== Qualified teams ==
The eight first qualified teams after the end of the regular season were qualified to the playoffs.

Pos	Team	Pld	W	L	PF	PA	PD	Qualification
1	EA7 Emporio Armani Milano	30	23	7	2481	2191	+290	Seeded teams
2	Virtus Segafredo Bologna	30	23	7	2542	2334	+208	Seeded teams
3	Bertram Dethona Tortona	30	18	12	2407	2337	+70	Seeded teams
4	Umana Reyer Venezia	30	17	13	2510	2402	+108	Seeded teams
5	Banco di Sardegna Sassari	30	17	13	2530	2413	+117	Non-seeded teams
6	Dolomiti Energia Trento	30	15	15	2288	2335	−47	Non-seeded teams
7	Happy Casa Brindisi	30	15	15	2494	2446	+48	Non-seeded teams
8	Carpegna Prosciutto Pesaro	30	14	16	2531	2613	−82	Non-seeded teams

Updated to match(es) played on 7 May 2023. Source: LBA

== Bracket ==
Quarterfinals
EA7 Emporio Armani Milano	94	86	83	94
Carpegna Prosciutto Pesaro	68	57	88	80
Umana Reyer Venezia	82	55	69	83
Banco di Sardegna Sassari	79	81	80	87
Virtus Segafredo Bologna	104	109	100
Happy Casa Brindisi	68	95	95
Bertram Derthona Tortona	79	84	76	82
Dolomiti Energia Trentino	78	81	79	81

Semifinals
EA7 Emporio Armani Milano	95	80	93
Banco di Sardegna Sassari	72	75	61
Virtus Segafredo Bologna	84	108	89
Bertram Derthona Tortona	61	78	82

Finals
EA7 Emporio Armani Milano	92	79	61	89	79	66	67
Virtus Segafredo Bologna	82	76	69	93	72	85	55

== Quarterfinals ==
All times were in Central European Summer Time (UTC+02:00)

The quarterfinals were played in a best of five format.

Team 1	Series	Team 2	Game 1	Game 2	Game 3	Game 4	Game 5
EA7 Emporio Armani Milano	3–1	Carpegna Prosciuto Pesaro	94–68	86–57	83–88	94–80	
Virtus Segafredo Bologna	3–0	Happy Casa Brindisi	104–68	109–95	100–95		
Bertram Derthona Tortona	3–1	Dolimiti Energia Trento	79–78	84–81	76–79	82–81	
Umana Reyer Venezia	1–3	Banco di Sardegna Sassari	82–79	55–81	69–80	87–83	

=== Game 1 ===
13 May 2023	EA7 Emporio Armani Milano	94–68 (Series: 1–0)	Carpegna Prosciuto Pesaro	Assago (Milan)
18:00 (CET)	Scoring by quarter: 26–16, 28–17, 24–23, 16–12
Eleven Sports, Nove	Pts: Baron 19; Rebs: Melli 6 Asts: Napier 4 PIR: Baron 23	Boxscore	Pts: Kravić 13; Rebs: Totè 8 Asts: Abdur-Rahkman 5 PIR: Totè 17	Arena: Mediolanum Forum; Referees: Rossi, Giovannetti, Gonella

13 May 2023	Virtus Segafredo Bologna	104–68 (Series: 1–0)	Happy Basket Brindisi	Bologna
20:30 (CET)	Scoring by quarter: 29–13, 35–23, 20–14, 20–18
Eleven Sports, Nove	Pts: Cordinier 15; Rebs: Mickey 8 Asts: Teodosić 7 PIR: Cordinier 25	Boxscore	Pts: Reed 18; Rebs: Reed 5 Asts: Mascolo 4 PIR: Reed 21	Arena: Segafredo Arena; Referees: Sahin, Attard, Borgo

13 May 2023	Umana Reyer Venezia	82–79 (Series: 1–0)	Banco di Sardegna Sassari	Mestre (Venice)
19:30 (CET)	Scoring by quarter: 22–29, 28–16, 15–13, 17–21
Eleven Sports, Eurosport	Pts: Watt 19; Rebs: Watt 7 Asts: Granger 6 PIR: Watt 22	Boxscore	Pts: Dowe 18; Rebs: Bendžius 6 Asts: Ousmane Diop 5 PIR: Ousmane Diop 23	Arena: Taliercio; Referees: Paternicò, Baldini, Borgioni

14 May 2023	Bertram Derthona Tortona	79–78 (Series: 1–0)	Dolomiti Energia Trento	Casale Monferrato (Alessandria)
18:00 (CET)	Scoring by quarter: 19–18, 24–27, 19–12, 17–21
Eleven Sports, Nove	Pts: Daum 14; Rebs: Cain 9 Asts: Tavernelli 4 PIR: Cain 18	Boxscore	Pts: Flaccadori 16; Rebs: Atkins; Asts: Gražulis 5 PIR: Spagnolo 17	Arena: PalaFerraris; Referees: Lo Guzzo, Grigioni, Valzani

=== Game 2 ===
15 May 2023	EA7 Emporio Armani Milano	86–57 (Series: 2–0)	Carpegna Prosciuto Pesaro	Assago (Milan)
21:00 (CET)	Scoring by quarter: 27–15, 17–11, 30–18, 12–13
Eleven Sports, DMAX	Pts: Hall 13; Rebs: Melli 7 Asts: Napier 7 PIR: Napier 21	Boxscore	Pts: Moretti 15; Rebs: Kravić 9 Asts: Tambone 4 PIR: Kravić 21	Arena: Mediolanum Forum; Referees: Paternicò, Attard, Perciavalle

15 May 2023	Virtus Segafredo Bologna	109–95 (Series: 2–0)	Happy Basket Brindisi	Bologna
20:30 (CET)	Scoring by quarter: 28–21, 25–27, 34–27, 22–20
Eleven Sports, Eurosport	Pts: Belinelli 18; Rebs: Shengelia 8 Asts: Cordinier 5 PIR: Shengelia 27	Boxscore	Pts: Harrison 21; Rebs: Perkins 6 Asts: Mascolo 5 PIR: Harrison 21	Arena: Segafredo Arena; Referees: Rossi, Martolini, Quarta

15 May 2023	Umana Reyer Venezia	55–81 (Series: 1–1)	Banco di Sardegna Sassari	Mestre (Venice)
20:00 (CET)	Scoring by quarter: 22–20, 14–17, 10–20, 9–24
Eleven Sports, Eurosport	Pts: Spissu 10; Rebs: Parks 4 Asts: Granger 3 PIR: Parks 8	Boxscore	Pts: Ousmane Diop 20; Rebs: Stephens 8 Asts: Dowe; PIR: Ousmane Diop 29	Arena: Taliercio; Referees: Lanzarini, Sahin, Bongiorni

16 May 2023	Bertram Derthona Tortona	84–81 (Series: 2–0)	Dolomiti Energia Trento	Casale Monferrato (Alessandria)
19:00 (CET)	Scoring by quarter: 18–17, 23–17, 25–24, 18–23
Eleven Sports, DMAX	Pts: Christon 18; Rebs: Daum 7 Asts: Christon 5 PIR: Harper 19	Boxscore	Pts: Gražulis 19; Rebs: Gražulis 7 Asts: Flaccadori 5 PIR: Gražulis 23	Arena: PalaFerraris; Referees: Begnis, Bartolini, Bettini

=== Game 3 ===
18 May 2023	Carpegna Prosciuto Pesaro	88–83 (Series: 1–2)	EA7 Emporio Armani Milano	Pesaro
20:00 (CET)	Scoring by quarter: 22–24, 14–18, 25–24, 27–17
Eleven Sports, Eurosport	Pts: Totè 16; Rebs: Kravić 6 Asts: Abdur-Rahkam 6 PIR: Totè 18	Boxscore	Pts: Napier 24; Rebs: Baron 5 Asts: Napier 3 PIR: Kravić 22	Arena: Vitrifrigo Arena; Referees: Mazzoni, Bartoli, Grigioni

18 May 2023	Banco di Sardegna Sassari	80–69 (Series: 2–1)	Umana Reyer Venezia	Sassari
21:00 (CET)	Scoring by quarter: 20–18, 21–17, 24–14, 15–20
Eleven Sports, DMAX	Pts: Jones 15; Rebs: Diop 7 Asts: Dowe 9 PIR: Dowe 18	Boxscore	Pts: Spissu 15; Rebs: Tessitori 10; Asts: Spissu 8 PIR: Spissu 23	Arena: PalaSerradimigni; Referees: Begnis, Martolini, Quarta

19 May 2023	Happy Basket Brindisi	95–100 (Series: 0–3)	Virtus Segafredo Bologna	Brindisi
21:00 (CET)	Scoring by quarter: 30–24, 23–25, 18–33, 24–18
Eleven Sports, Eurosport, DMAX	Pts: Reed 33; Rebs: Bowman 5 Asts: Harrison 4 PIR: Reed 36	Boxscore	Pts: Belinelli 18; Rebs: Shengelia 9 Asts: Teodosić 5 PIR: Shengelia 25	Arena: PalaPentassuglia; Referees: Giovannetti, Loguzzo, Gonella

19 May 2023	Dolomiti Energia Trento	79–76 (Series: 1–2)	Bertram Derthona Tortona	Trento
20:00 (CET)	Scoring by quarter: 10–12, 18–27, 22–14, 29–23
Eleven Sports, Eurosport	Pts: Flaccadori 19; Rebs: Gražulis 9 Asts: Spagnolo 3 PIR: Flaccadori 22	Boxscore	Pts: Harper 15; Rebs: Cain 8 Asts: Christon 4 PIR: Radošević 17	Arena: PalaTrento; Referees: Lanzarini, Baldini, Borgioni

=== Game 4 ===
20 May 2023	Carpegna Prosciuto Pesaro	80–94 (Series: 1–3)	EA7 Emporio Armani Milano	Pesaro
20:30 (CET)	Scoring by quarter: 17–34, 23–21, 14–16, 26–23
Eleven Sports, Eurosport	Pts: Delfino 14; Rebs: Charalampopoulos 8 Asts: Moretti 4 PIR: Delfino 18	Boxscore	Pts: Shields 25; Rebs: Melli 8 Asts: Baron 5 PIR: Shields 34	Arena: Vitrifrigo Arena; Referees: Begnis, Sahin, Bongiorni

20 May 2023	Banco di Sardegna Sassari	87–83 (Series: 3–1)	Umana Reyer Venezia	Sassari
21:30 (CET)	Scoring by quarter: 24–25, 21–8, 15–20, 27–30
Eleven Sports, Nove	Pts: Krušlin 22; Rebs: Diop 10; Asts: Dowe 5 PIR: Diop 27	Boxscore	Pts: Granger 30; Rebs: Watt 5 Asts: Tessitori 3 PIR: Granger 31	Arena: PalaSerradimigni; Referees: Mazzoni, Attard, Bettini

21 May 2023	Dolomiti Energia Trento	81–82 (Series: 1–3)	Bertram Derthona Tortona	Trento
17:30 (CET)	Scoring by quarter: 27–19, 12–25, 20–26, 22–12
Eleven Sports, Eurosport	Pts: Spagnolo 23; Rebs: Spagnolo 8 Asts: Flaccadori 4 PIR: Spagnolo 23	Boxscore	Pts: Christon 21; Rebs: Cain 11; Asts: Christon 8 PIR: Christon 22	Arena: PalaTrento; Referees: Paternicò, Grigioni, Borgo

== Semifinals ==
The semifinals were played in a best of five format.

Team 1	Series	Team 2	Game 1	Game 2	Game 3	Game 4	Game 5
EA7 Emporio Armani Milano	3–0	Banco di Sardegna Sassari	95–72	80–75	93–61		
Virtus Segafredo Bologna	3–0	Bertram Derthona Basket	84–61	108–78	89–82		

=== Game 1 ===
27 May 2023	EA7 Emporio Armani Milano	95–72 (Series: 1–0)	Banco di Sardegna Sassari	Assago (Milan)
18:00 (CET)	Scoring by quarter: 25–12, 27–17, 26–19, 17–24
	Pts: Voigtmann 22; Rebs: Voigtmann 7 Asts: Napier 9 PIR: Voigtmann 25	Boxscore	Pts: Diop, Dowe 13; Rebs: Diop 5 Asts: Robinson 5 PIR: Diop 21	Arena: Mediolanum Forum; Referees: Giovannetti, Sahin, Bongiorni

28 May 2023	Virtus Segafredo Bologna	84–61 (Series: 1–0)	Bertram Derthona Tortona	Bologna
19:30 (CET)	Scoring by quarter: 23–13, 21–11, 19–17, 21–20
	Pts: Belinelli, Ojeleye 15; Rebs: Jaiteh 10; Asts: Shengelia 5 PIR: Shengelia 22	Boxscore	Pts: Macura 20; Rebs: three players 6 Asts: Christon 4 PIR: Macura 18	Arena: Segafredo Arena; Referees: Begnis, Baldini, Grigioni

=== Game 2 ===
29 May 2023	EA7 Emporio Armani Milano	80–75 (Series: 2–0)	Banco di Sardegna Sassari	Assago (Milan)
21:00 (CET)	Scoring by quarter: 13–19, 26–19, 21–18, 20–19
	Pts: Datome 19; Rebs: Melli 8 Asts: Shields 5 PIR: Datome, Shields 19	Boxscore	Pts: Bendžius 21; Rebs: Dowe 9 Asts: Dowe 6 PIR: Dowe 23	Arena: Mediolanum Forum; Referees: Lanzarini, Bartoli, Valzani

30 May 2023	Virtus Segafredo Bologna	108–78 (Series: 2–0)	Bertram Derthona Tortona	Bologna
21:00 (CET)	Scoring by quarter: 23–20, 32–20, 25–18, 28–20
	Pts: Mickey 20; Rebs: Jaiteh 10; Asts: Pajola, Teodosić 7 PIR: Mickey 30	Boxscore	Pts: Daum 17; Rebs: Daum, Severini 5 Asts: Macura 5 PIR: Daum 21	Arena: Segafredo Arena; Referees: Mazzoni, Lo Guzzi, Borgo

=== Game 3 ===
1 June 2023	Banco di Sardegna Sassari	61–93 (Series: 0–3)	EA7 Emporio Armani Milano	Sassari
21:00 (CET)	Scoring by quarter: 16–22, 20–19, 17–25, 8–27
	Pts: Robinson 15; Rebs: Diop 6 Asts: Dowe 4 PIR: Robinson 12	Boxscore	Pts: Napier 21; Rebs: Melli 9 Asts: Baron 6 PIR: Napier 28	Arena: PalaSerradimigni; Referees: Attard, Baldini, Borgioni

2 June 2023	Bertram Derthona Tortona	82–89 (Series: 0–3)	Virtus Segafredo Bologna	Casale Monferrato (Alessandria)
21:00 (CET)	Scoring by quarter: 26–21, 29–18, 15–27, 12–23
	Pts: Daum 17; Rebs: Cain 7 Asts: Candi 4 PIR: Candi, Daum 16	Boxscore	Pts: Hackett 22; Rebs: Shengelia 7 Asts: Shengelia 6 PIR: Hackett 26	Arena: PalaFerraris; Referees: Paternicò, Martolini, Gonella

== Finals ==
The finals were played in a best of seven format.

Team 1	Series	Team 2	Game 1	Game 2	Game 3	Game 4	Game 5	Game 6	Game 7
EA7 Emporio Armani Milano	4–3	Virtus Segafredo Bologna	92–82	79–76	61–69	89–93	79–72	66–85	67-55

=== Game 1 ===
9 June 2023	EA7 Emporio Armani Milano	92–82 (Series: 1–0)	Virtus Segafredo Bologna	Assago (Milan)
20:30 (CET)	Scoring by quarter: 21–19, 15–25, 27–20, 29–18
	Pts: Napier 22; Rebs: Melli 6 Asts: Hall 5 PIR: Hall 21	Boxscore	Pts: Belinelli 19; Rebs: Shengelia 6 Asts: Hackett 6 PIR: Belinelli, Shengelia 18	Arena: Mediolanum Forum; Referees: Paternicò, Mazzoni, Bartoli

=== Game 2 ===
11 June 2023	EA7 Emporio Armani Milano	79–76 (Series: 2–0)	Virtus Segafredo Bologna	Assago (Milan)
18:00 (CET)	Scoring by quarter: 14–17, 24–18, 19–19, 22–22
	Pts: Shields 18; Rebs: Melli 8 Asts: Napier 4 PIR: Shields 16	Boxscore	Pts: Shengelia 17; Rebs: Shengelia 5 Asts: Hackett 8 PIR: Shengelia 24	Arena: Mediolanum Forum; Referees: Lanzarini, Giovannetti, Gonella

=== Game 3 ===
14 June 2023	Virtus Segafredo Bologna	69–61 (Series: 1–2)	EA7 Emporio Armani Milano	Bologna
20:30 (CET)	Scoring by quarter: 15–17, 19–12, 18–13, 17–19
	Pts: Hackett 13; Rebs: Shengelia 9 Asts: Teodosić 7 PIR: Hackett 23	Boxscore	Pts: Baron 15; Rebs: Melli 8 Asts: Voigtmann 6 PIR: Baron 11	Arena: Segafredo Arena; Referees: Mazzoni, Sahin, Bongiorni

=== Game 4 ===
16 June 2023	Virtus Segafredo Bologna	93–89(OT) (Series: 2–2)	EA7 Emporio Armani Milano	Bologna
20:30 (CET)	Scoring by quarter: 24–14, 16–17, 20–16, 16–29, Overtime: 4–4, 13–9
	Pts: Belinelli, Mickey 18; Rebs: Cordinier 14; Asts: Teodosić 8 PIR: Mickey 20	Boxscore	Pts: Shields 26; Rebs: Melli 11; Asts: Napier 8 PIR: Shields 24	Arena: Segafredo Arena; Referees: Begnis, Attard, Grigioni

=== Game 5 ===
19 June 2023	EA7 Emporio Armani Milano	79–72 (Series: 3–2)	Virtus Segafredo Bologna	Assago (Milan)
20:30 (CET)	Scoring by quarter: 26–24, 16–13, 17–17, 16–20–18
	Pts: Shields 22; Rebs: Melli 12; Asts: Napier, Voigtmann 5 PIR: Shields 24	Boxscore	Pts: Belinelli 17; Rebs: Hackett 5 Asts: Cordinier 4 PIR: Hackett 19	Arena: Mediolanum Forum; Referees: Lanzarini, Attard, Borgioni

=== Game 6 ===
21 June 2023	Virtus Segafredo Bologna	85–66 (Series: 3–3)	EA7 Emporio Armani Milano	Bologna
20:30 (CET)	Scoring by quarter: 23–27, 26–16, 18–16, 18–17
	Pts: Belinelli 14; Rebs: Jaiteh 7 Asts: Hackett 7 PIR: Hackett 23	Boxscore	Pts: Melli, Voigtmann 11; Rebs: Melli 6 Asts: Napier 4 PIR: Melli 13	Arena: Segafredo Arena; Referees: Paternicò, Begnis, Giovannetti
