= 2022–23 LBA season =

LBA
- League: Lega Basket Serie A
- Season: 2022–23
- Dates: 2 October 2022 – 23 June 2023
- Teams: 16

Regular season
- Season MVP: (United States) Colbey Ross

LBA Finals
- Champions: AX Armani Exchange Milano (30th title)
- Runners-up: Virtus Segafredo Bologna
- Finals MVP: (Italy) Luigi Datome

Statistical leaders
Points	(United States) Frank Bartley	19.5
Rebounds	(United States) Trevor Thompson	8.1
Assists	(Italy) Andrea Cinciarini	10.0

Lega Basket Serie A seasons
- ← 2021–22 2023–24 →

The 2022–23 LBA season is the 101st season of the Lega Basket Serie A (LBA), the men's top tier professional basketball division of the Italian basketball league system.

== Teams ==
=== Promotion and relegation ===
Fortitudo Bologna and Vanoli Cremona ended, respectively, on 15th and 16th place and therefore relegated to the Serie A2.

Scafati and Verona were two best teams in Serie A2 and therefore promoted to Serie A.

=== Number of teams by region ===
Number of teams	Region	Team(s)
3	Lombardy	AX Armani Exchange Milano; Germani Basket Brescia; Openjobmetis Varese
3	Veneto	NutriBullet Treviso; Umana Reyer Venezia; Tezenis Verona
2	Campania	Gevi Napoli; Givova Scafati
2	Emilia-Romagna	UNAHOTELS Reggio Emilia; Virtus Segafredo Bologna
1	Apulia	Happy Casa Brindisi
1	Friuli-Venezia Giulia	Allianz Pallacanestro Trieste
1	Marche	Carpegna Prosciutto Basket Pesaro
1	Sardinia	Banco di Sardegna Sassari
1	Trentino-Alto Adige/Südtirol	Dolomiti Energia Trento
1	Piedmont	Bertram Derthona Tortona

=== Venues and locations ===
Location of teams in 2022–23 LBA season

Team	Home city	Arena	Capacity	2021–22 result
Allianz Pallacanestro Trieste	Trieste	Allianz Dome	6,943	9th
AX Armani Exchange Milano	Milan	Mediolanum Forum	12,331	1st
Banco di Sardegna Sassari	Sassari	PalaSerradimigni	5,000	4th
Bertram Derthona Basket Tortona	Tortona	PalaFerraris	3,510	3rd
Carpegna Prosciutto Basket Pesaro	Pesaro	Vitifrigo Arena	10,323	8th
Dolomiti Energia Trento	Trento	BLM Group Arena	4,360	13th
Germani Brescia	Brescia	PalaLeonessa	5,200	5th
Givova Scafati	Scafati	PalaMangano	3,700	promoted to LBA
Gevi Napoli	Naples	PalaBarbuto	5,500	14th
Happy Casa Brindisi	Brindisi	PalaPentassuglia	3,534	11th
NutriBullet Treviso	Treviso	PalaVerde	5,134	10th
Openjobmetis Varese	Varese	Enerxenia Arena	5,107	12th
Tezenis Verona	Verona	PalaOlimpia	5,200	promoted to LBA
Umana Reyer Venezia	Venice	Palasport Taliercio	3,506	6th
UNAHOTELS Reggio Emilia	Reggio Emilia	PalaBigi	4,530	7th
Virtus Segafredo Bologna	Bologna	Segafredo Arena	9,980	2nd

== Regular season ==
In the regular season, teams play against each other home-and-away in a round-robin format. The matchdays are from 2 October 2022, to May 2023.

=== League table ===
Pos	Team	Pld	W	L	PF	PA	PD	Pts	Qualification
1	EA7 Emporio Armani Milano	30	23	7	2481	2191	+290	46	Qualification to Playoffs
2	Virtus Segafredo Bologna	30	23	7	2542	2334	+208	46	Qualification to Playoffs
3	Bertram Derthona Basket	30	18	12	2407	2337	+70	36	Qualification to Playoffs
4	Umana Reyer Venezia	30	17	13	2510	2402	+108	34	Qualification to Playoffs
5	Banco di Sardegna Sassari	30	17	13	2530	2413	+117	34	Qualification to Playoffs
6	Dolomiti Energia Trento	30	15	15	2288	2335	−47	30	Qualification to Playoffs
7	Happy Casa Brindisi	30	15	15	2494	2446	+48	30	Qualification to Playoffs
8	Carpegna Prosciutto Pesaro	30	14	16	2531	2613	−82	28	Qualification to Playoffs
9	Germani Basket Brescia	30	14	16	2474	2426	+48	28	
10	Givova Scafati	30	12	18	2378	2414	−36	24	
11	NutriBullet Treviso	30	12	18	2433	2609	−176	24	
12	GeVi Napoli	30	12	18	2379	2515	−136	24	
13	Openjobmetis Varese (Note: 11 point deducted.)	30	17	13	2726	2722	+4	23	
14	UNAHOTELS Reggio Emilia	30	11	19	2287	2312	−25	22	
15	Allianz Pallacanestro Trieste	30	11	19	2345	2519	−174	22	Relegation to Serie A2
16	Tezenis Verona	30	9	21	2353	2570	−217	18	Relegation to Serie A2

Source: LBA

=== Results ===
Home \ Away	BRE	BRI	MIL	NAP	PES	REG	SAS	SCA	TOR	TRE	TRI	TVS	VAR	VER	VEN	VBO
Germani Brescia	—	75–69	83–74	95–72	97–98	84–77	80–93	82–81	83–68	73–78	95–59	80–81	88–83	88–79	74–79	77–89
Happy Casa Brindisi	82–81	—	79–98	77–70	74–102	81–74	92–58	71–75	86–84	73–86	92–70	107–84	90–104	102–68	75–63	78–77
EA7 Emporio Armani Milano	78–77	83–82	—	88–76	102–70	81–63	79–67	89–80	79–63	78–65	98–81	92–78	96–84	78–54	73–76	69–75
Generazione Vincente Napoli Basket	69–72	80–96	87–81	—	98–87	73–67	93–83	71–69	82–69	69–58	92–95	84–82	93–101	74–80	91–93	77–89
Carpegna Prosciutto Pesaro	88–79	70–100	71–85	97–99	—	85–74	81–75	79–86	82–78	70–84	94–83	101–72	101–93	76–73	90–89	82–87
UNAHOTELS Reggio Emilia	69–74	92–78	73–68	80–62	95–76	—	74–99	78–70	59–63	94–70	79–84	88–77	81–87	65–70	101–115	63–74
Banco di Sardegna Sassari	92–94	111–93	63–92	86–69	110–74	89–77	—	86–76	84–72	81–76	103–80	81–68	102–73	101–79	90–81	69–74
Givova Scafati	92–88	85–84	66–75	96–61	69–81	61–59	80–90	—	72–91	74–79	93–85	89–72	93–101	92–87	89–85	81–83
Bertram Derthona Tortona	77–90	81–77	75–77	74–73	81–73	74–68	79–82	79–74	—	76–70	80–69	90–95	103–91	73–69	77–61	89–81
Dolomiti Energia Trento	83–76	68–78	77–75	79–87	79–75	68–84	77–95	75–68	73–75	—	85–68	66–57	90–80	69–70	86–84	64–71
Allianz Pallacanestro Trieste	90–91	66–83	59–65	85–68	74–100	75–80	75–69	64–59	60–88	74–68	—	97–86	80–83	85–77	78–95	80–78
NutriBullet Treviso	99–92	75–68	80–93	85–82	96–82	58–78	79–71	89–88	79–87	85–76	69–88	—	95–97	77–79	100–93	89–88
Openjobmetis Varese	80–72	93–86	75–87	106–79	110–99	81–85	87–81	95–81	88–89	91–94	104–99	87–85	—	98–94	93–90	100–108
Tezenis Verona	81–77	100–97	61–83	82–88	90–94	78–76	87–74	78–86	80–102	86–92	88–81	81–97	91–98	—	92–95	60–85
Umana Reyer Venezia	82–79	75–76	77–69	82–71	93–77	78–69	86–76	80–69	89–80	72–73	72–81	107–73	92–81	80–57	—	68–83
Virtus Segafredo Bologna	84–78	98–68	74–96	81–89	88–76	79–65	86–69	77–84	91–90	96–80	85–80	97–71	98–82	87–82	79–78	—

Legend: Blue = home team win; Red = away team win.
Matches with lighter background shading were decided after overtime.

== Playoffs ==
The LBA playoffs quarterfinals and semifinals are best of five formats, while the finals series are best of seven format. The playoffs will start in May 2023, to finish in June 2023, depending on result.

Quarterfinals
1	EA7 Emporio Armani Milano	3
8	Carpegna Prosciutto Pesaro	1
4	Umana Reyer Venezia	1
5	Banco di Sardegna Sassari	3
2	Virtus Segafredo Bologna	3
7	Happy Casa Brindisi	0
3	Bertram Derthona Tortona	3
6	Dolomiti Energia Trento	1

Semifinals
1	EA7 Emporio Armani Milano	3
5	Banco di Sardegna Sassari	0
2	Virtus Segafredo Bologna	3
3	Bertram Derthona Tortona	0

Finals
1	EA7 Emporio Armani Milano	4
2	Virtus Segafredo Bologna	3

=== Quarterfinals ===
Team 1	Series	Team 2	Game 1	Game 2	Game 3	Game 4	Game 5
EA7 Emporio Armani Milano	3–1	Carpegna Prosciutto Pesaro	94–68	86–57	83–88	94–80	
Umana Reyer Venezia	1–3	Banco di Sardegna Sassari	82–79	55–81	69–80	83–87	
Virtus Segafredo Bologna	3–0	Happy Casa Brindisi	104–68	109–95	100–95		
Bertram Dethona Tortona	3–1	Dolomiti Energia Trento	79–78	84–81	76–79	82–81	

=== Semifinals ===
Team 1	Series	Team 2	Game 1	Game 2	Game 3	Game 4	Game 5
EA7 Emporio Armani Milano	3–0	Banco di Sardegna Sassari	95–72	80–75	93–61		
Virtus Segafredo Bologna	3–0	Bertram Dethona Tortona	84–61	108–78	89–82		

=== Finals ===
Team 1	Series	Team 2	Game 1	Game 2	Game 3	Game 4	Game 5	Game 6	Game 7
EA7 Emporio Armani Milano	4–3	Virtus Segafredo Bologna	92–82	79–76	61–69	89–93	79–72	66–85	67–55

=== Game 1 ===
9 June 2023	EA7 Emporio Armani Milano	92–82	Virtus Segafredo Bologna
20:30 (CET)	Scoring by quarter: 21–19, 15–25, 27–20, 29–18
	Pts: Napier 22; Rebs: Melli 6 Asts: Hall 5	Boxscore	Pts: Belinelli 19; Rebs: Shengelia 6 Asts: Hackett 6	Arena: Unipol Forum; Referees: Paternico; Mazzoni; Bartoli

=== Game 2 ===
11 June 2023	EA7 Emporio Armani Milano	79–76	Virtus Segafredo Bologna
18:00 (CET)	Scoring by quarter: 14–17, 24–18, 19–19, 22–22
	Pts: Shields 18; Rebs: Melli 8 Voigtmann 7 Asts: Napier 4	Boxscore	Pts: Shengelia 17; Rebs: Shengelia 5 Asts: Hackett 8	Arena: Unipol Forum; Referees: Lanzarini; Giovannetti; Gonella

=== Game 3 ===
14 June 2023	Virtus Segafredo Bologna	69–61	EA7 Emporio Armani Milano
20:30 (CET)	Scoring by quarter: 15–17, 19–12, 18–13, 17–19
	Pts: Hackett 13; Rebs: Shengelia 9 Asts: Teodosic 7 Shengelia 6	Boxscore	Pts: Baron 15; Rebs: Melli 8 Asts: Voigtmann 6	Arena: Virtus Segafredo Arena; Referees: Mazzoni; Sahin; Borgioni

=== Game 4 ===
16 June 2023	Virtus Segafredo Bologna	93–89(OT)	EA7 Emporio Armani Milano
20:30 (CET)	Scoring by quarter: 24–14, 16–17, 20–16, 16–29, Overtime: 17–13
	Pts: Belinelli 18; Mickey 18; Rebs: Cordinier 14; Mickey 7 Asts: Teodosic 8	Boxscore	Pts: Shields 26; Rebs: Melli 11; Shields 9 Asts: Napier 8	Arena: Virtus Segafredo Arena; Referees: Begnis; Attard; Grigioni

=== Game 5 ===
19 June 2023	EA7 Emporio Armani Milano	79–72	Virtus Segafredo Bologna
20:30 (CET)	Scoring by quarter: 26–24, 16–13, 17–17, 20–18
	Pts: Shields 22; Rebs: Melli 12; Asts: Napier 5 Voigtmann 5	Boxscore	Pts: Belinelli 17; Rebs: Hackett 5 Asts: Cordinier 8	Arena: Unipol Forum; Referees: Lanzarini; Attard; Borgioni

=== Game 6 ===
21 June 2023	Virtus Segafredo Bologna	85–66	EA7 Emporio Armani Milano
20:30 (CET)	Scoring by quarter: 23–27, 26–16, 18–16, 18–7
	Pts: Belinelli 14; Rebs: Jaiteh 7 Asts: Hackett 7	Boxscore	Pts: Melli 11; Voigtmann 11; Rebs: Melli 6 Asts: Napier 4	Arena: Virtus Segafredo Arena; Referees: Paternico; Begnis; Giovannetti

=== Game 7 ===
23 June 2023	EA7 Emporio Armani Milano	67–55	Virtus Segafredo Bologna
20:30 (CET)	Scoring by quarter: 21–9, 17–20, 10–5, 19–21
	Pts: Datome 16; Rebs: Melli 7 Asts: Napier 6	Boxscore	Pts: Shengelia 13; Rebs: Hackett 6 Asts: Hackett 5	Arena: Unipol Forum; Referees: Lanzarini; Mazzoni; Bartoli

== Final standings ==
Pos	Team	Pld	W	L	Qualification or relegation
1	EA7 Emporio Armani Milano (C)	44	33	11	Already qualified to EuroLeague
2	Virtus Segafredo Bologna	43	32	11	Already qualified to EuroLeague
3	Bertram Derthona Tortona	37	21	16	Qualification to Champions League regular season
4	Banco di Sardegna Sassari	37	20	17	Qualification to Champions League regular season
5	Umana Reyer Venezia	34	18	16	Qualification to EuroCup
6	Dolomiti Energia Trento	34	16	18	Qualification to EuroCup
7	Happy Casa Brindisi	33	15	18	Qualification to Champions League qualifying rounds
8	Carpegna Prosciutto Pesaro	34	15	19	
9	Germani Brescia	30	14	16	
10	Givova Scafati	30	12	18	
11	NutriBullet Treviso	30	12	18	
12	Generazione Vincente Napoli Basket	30	12	18	
13	Openjobmetis Varese	30	17	13	Qualification to Champions League qualifying rounds
14	UNAHOTELS Reggio Emilia	30	11	19	
15	Allianz Pallacanestro Trieste (R)	30	11	19	Relegation to Serie A2
16	Tezenis Verona (R)	30	9	21	Relegation to Serie A2

Source: LBA
(C) Champions; (R) Relegated

== Awards ==
Pos.	Player	Team	Ref.
Lega Serie A MVP
PG	(United States) Colbey Ross	Varese	
Lega Serie A Finals MVP
SF	(Italy) Luigi Datome	Olimpia Milano	
Top Scorer
SG	(United States) Frank Bartley	Pallacanestro Trieste	
Domestic Player of the Year
SG	(Italy) Marco Belinelli	Virtus Bologna	
Best Young Player
PG	(Italy) Matteo Spagnolo	Trento	
Best Defender
SG	(Italy) John Petrucelli	Brescia	
Sixth Man of the Year
SG	(Italy) Marco Belinelli	Virtus Bologna	
Most Improved Player
C	(Senegal) Ousmane Diop	Dinamo Sassari	
Revealing Player of the Year
PG	(United States) Colbey Ross	Varese	
Coach of the Year
HD	(Italy) Marco Ramondino	Derthona	
All-Lega Serie A Team
PG	(United States) Colbey Ross	Varese	
SG	(United States) Semaj Christon	Derthona	
SF	(Italy) Marco Belinelli	Virtus Bologna	
PF	(Italy) Nicolò Melli	Olimpia Milano	
C	(United States) JaCorey Williams	Napoli	

== Serie A clubs in European competitions ==
In the 2022–23 season, Olimpia Milano and Virtus Bologna participate in the EuroLeague. Brescia, Trento and Venezia participate in the EuroCup. Reggio Emilia and Sassari participate in the Champions League. Brindisi participates in the Europe Cup.

== See also ==
- 2022 Italian Basketball Supercup
