= Ousmane Diop =

Senegalese footballer

Personal information
- Full name: Vieux Ousmane Diop
- Date of birth: 9 December 1975 (age 50)
- Place of birth: Dakar, Senegal
- Height: 1.91 m (6 ft 3 in)
- Position: Defender

Senior career*
Years	Team	Apps	(Gls)
1994–1999	Douanes	117	(6)
1999–2001	Skoda Xanthi	34	(4)
2001–2002	Egaleo	4	(0)
2002–2003	Dobrudzha Dobrich	12	(0)
2004	IR Tangier		
2005	Dakar UC		

International career
1999–2001	Senegal	17	(1)
- * Club domestic league appearances and goals

Ousmane Diop (born 9 December 1975) is a retired Senegalese footballer.

== Career ==
Diop played for Skoda Xanthi and Egaleo in the Greek Alpha Ethniki. He also had a spell with Dobrudzha Dobrich in the Bulgarian A PFG.

Diop made several appearances for the Senegal national football team and played at the 2000 African Cup of Nations finals.
