= Johannes Voigtmann =

German basketball player (born 1992)

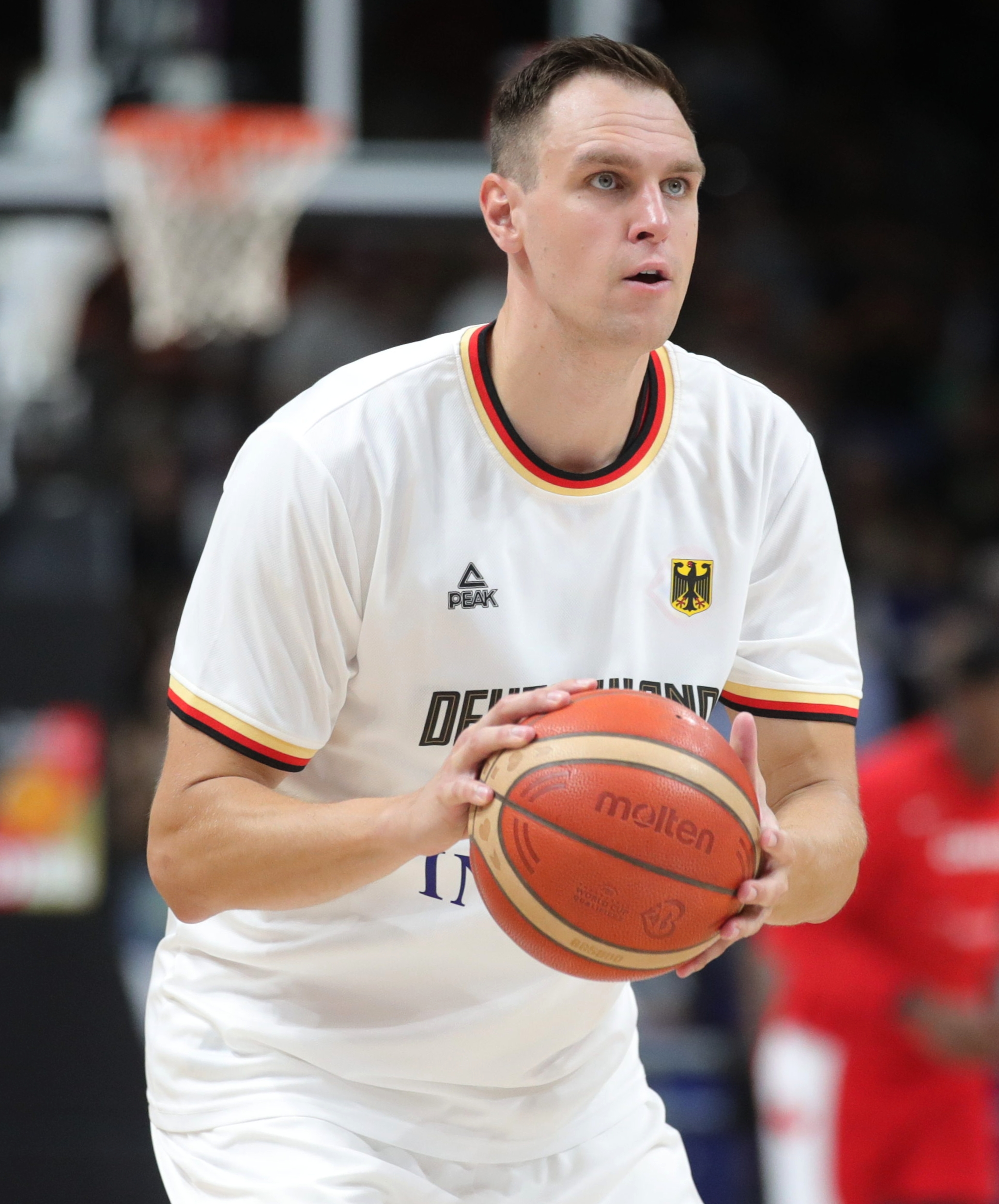
- Voigtmann playing for Germany in 2023

No. 7 – Bayern Munich
- Position: Power forward / center
- League: BBL; EuroLeague

Personal information
- Born: 30 September 1992 (age 34) Eisenach, Germany
- Listed height: 2.11 m (6 ft 11 in)
- Listed weight: 115 kg (254 lb)

Career information
- NBA draft: 2014: undrafted
- Playing career: 2010–present

Career history
- 2010–2012: Science City Jena
- 2012–2016: Skyliners Frankfurt
- 2016–2019: Baskonia
- 2019–2022: CSKA Moscow
- 2022–2024: Olimpia Milano
- 2024–present: Bayern Munich

Career highlights
- FIBA Europe Cup champion (2016); Bundesliga champion (2025); VTB United League champion (2021); 2× German All-Star (2015, 2016); All-German BBL Second Team (2016); German BBL Most Improved Player (2015); German BBL Best German Young Player (2015)
Medals
Men's basketball
Representing Germany
FIBA World Cup
Gold medal – first place	2023 Philippines–Japan–Indonesia
EuroBasket
Gold medal – first place	2025 Cyprus–Finland–Poland–Latvia
Bronze medal – third place	2022 Czech Republic–Georgia–Italy–Germany

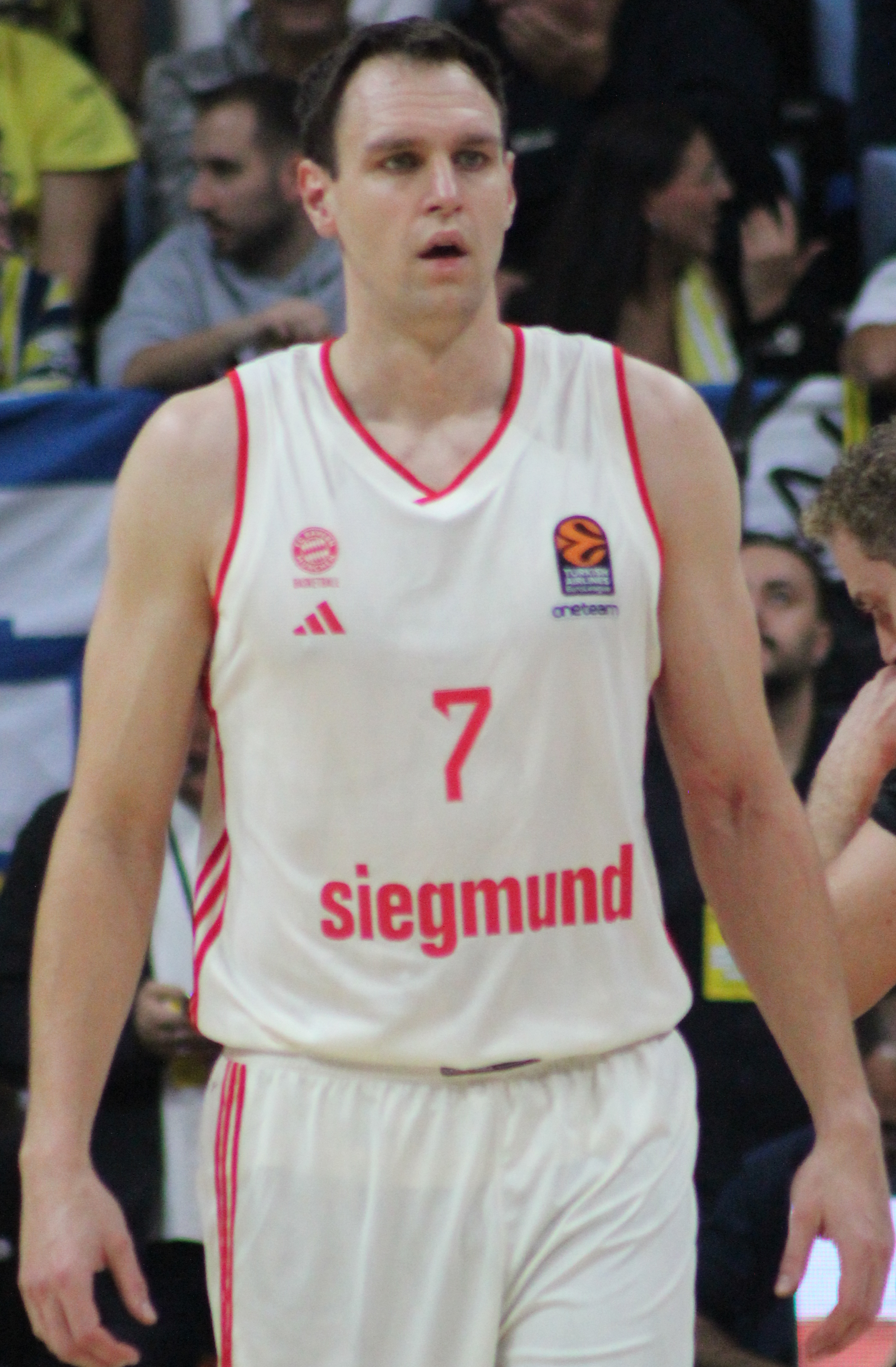
Voigtmann playing for Bayern Munich in 2024

Johannes "Jo" Voigtmann (born 30 September 1992) is a German professional basketball player for Bayern Munich of the German Basketball Bundesliga (BBL) and the EuroLeague. He is also a member of the senior German national team. He is 2.11 m tall and he plays at both the power forward and center positions.

== Professional career ==
=== Germany ===
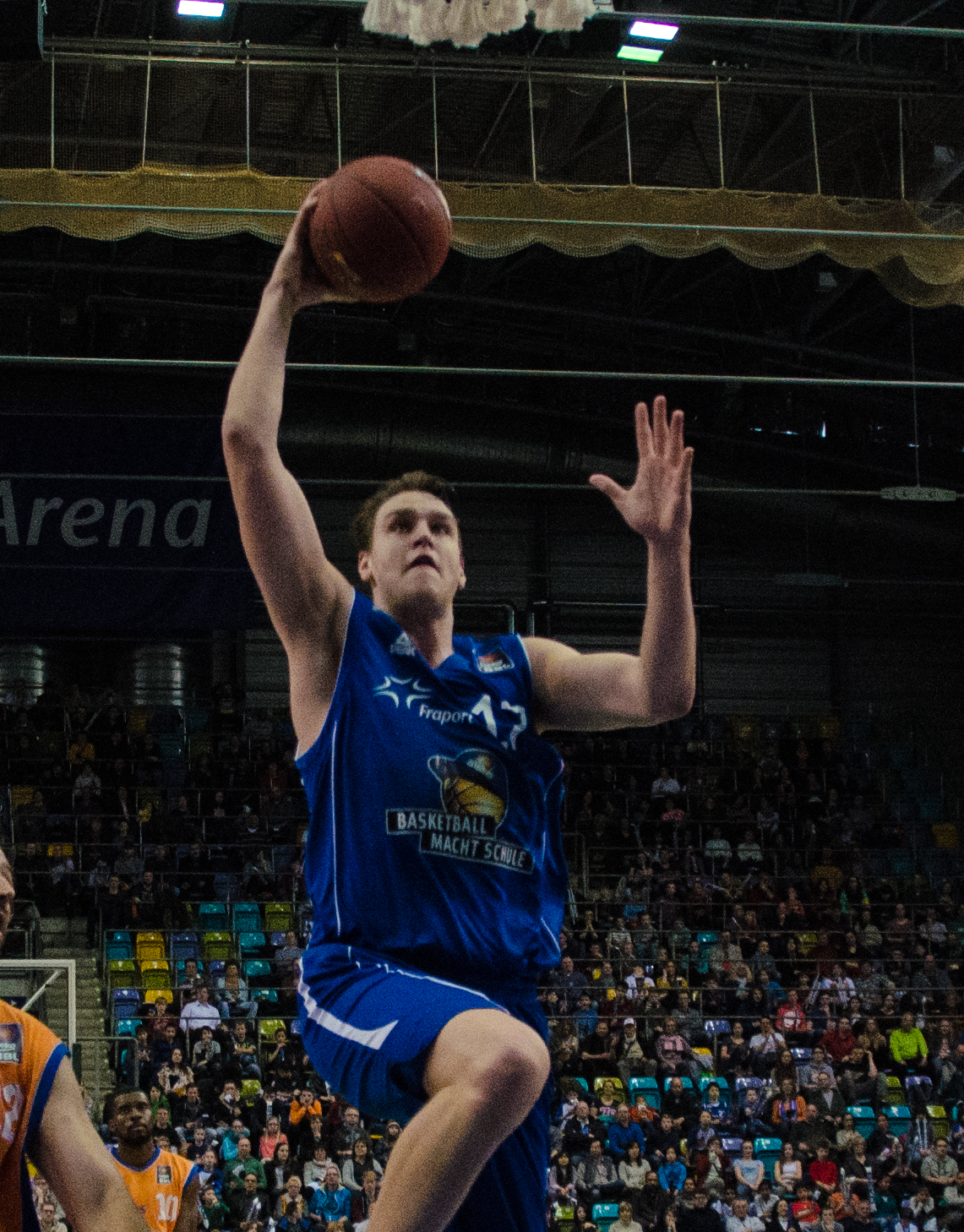
Voigtmann, playing for Frankfurt Skyliners in 2015.

Voigtmann played handball in his hometown of Eisenach before turning to basketball. After making noise in the Jena youth ranks, he made his debut in Germany's second-tier ProA with Science City Jena during the 2010–11 campaign. In 2012, he signed a 2-year deal with Basketball Bundesliga side Fraport Skyliners. He extended his contract with the Skyliners for 2 more years in 2014. In 2015, he made his first All-Star Game appearance. In the 2015–16 season, Voigtmann won the FIBA Europe Cup championship with the Skyliners, after beating Openjobmetis Varese in the cup's final.

=== Baskonia ===
In June 2016, Voigtmann signed with Baskonia of the Spanish top-flight Liga ACB. In his EuroLeague debut with Baskonia, Voigtmann scored 12 points in an 85–84 win against Anadolu Efes. In his first EuroLeague season, he averaged 10.1 points, 7 rebounds and 1.7 assists over 33 games. In his first season with Baskonia in the Liga ACB, he averaged 7.8 points, 1.8 assists and 6 rebounds in 32 games. In the 2017–18 ACB season he played 33 games of Liga ACB, and averaged 7.8 points, 1.7 assists and 5.2 rebounds. In the 2018–19 ACB season, his last before moving to CSKA, he played 33 games, averaging 9.3 points (career high in Spain), 2.5 assists, and 5.6 rebounds.

=== CSKA Moscow ===
On 2 July 2019, CSKA Moscow announced that Voigtmann had signed a 2-year deal with the team with an option for a third year. On 11 June 2021, said option was exercised by the Russian club, keeping Voigtmann in Moscow for another season.

Voigtmann played 28 games with CSKA in the 2019–20 EuroLeague, averaging 7.7 points, 1.5 assists and 5.2 rebounds. In his second season at CSKA he played 37 games in the 2020–21 EuroLeague, and averaged 8.5 points, 1.3 assists, and 5 rebounds therein. He played 16 games in the 2019–20 VTB United League, averaging 8.6 points, 1.8 assists and 4 rebounds. In the 2020–21 VTB United League he played 28 games, and averaged 10 points, 2.3 assists and 6 rebounds.

On 27 February 2022, upon the outbreak of the 2022 Russian invasion of Ukraine, he left the team. He said:

"In the current situation, I can't reconcile myself playing for a Russian team. Even if it's just about basketball, it involves symbolism that I think is inappropriate at the moment. The Russian president is responsible for a brutal war, because of which innocent people are dying in Ukraine. Millions of people have to flee their homes, and children, in particular, are losing their homes or even their lives. I just couldn't stay in Russia and carry on as if nothing had happened...."

The team accused him of violating his contract.

=== Olimpia Milano ===
On 2 September 2022, Voigtmann signed a two-year contract with Olimpia Milano of the Italian Lega Basket Serie A (LBA) and the EuroLeague.

== International career ==
In 2014, he made his debut in the senior German national team, when he played in the qualifying rounds for EuroBasket 2015. He played his first game with Germany in a friendly match, which his team lost to Italy, by a score of 91–59.

He represented Germany at the EuroBasket 2015.

=== 2020 Summer Olympics ===
Voigtmann helped Germany to qualify for the 2020 Summer Olympics. He scored a jumper in a team-high 13 points for his national team against Russia, leading Germany to a 69–67 win.

At Tokyo 2020, Germany men's national basketball team managed to reach the quarterfinals, something that had happened only in 1984 and 1992. He was the rebounding leader against Italy, in their first game in the tournament, lost 82–92 by Germany. Voigtmann was Germany's leading scorer and top performer against Nigeria, recording 19 points, grabbing 7 rebounds, and dishing out one assist for a 21 efficiency in Germany's 92–99 win. He grabbed 13 rebounds in Germany's loss to eventual bronze medalist Australia, in their third and last game of the group stage.

Voigtmann played positively at the 2020 Summer Olympics basketball tournament. He averaged 8 rebounds, being the fifth rebounding leader of the tournament. He also shot 35.7 from three. By the end of the tournament, he was ranked among the players who "should be on NBA radars".

== Career statistics ==
Legend
GP	Games played	GS	Games started	MPG	Minutes per game
FG%	Field-goal percentage	3P%	3-point field-goal percentage	FT%	Free-throw percentage
RPG	Rebounds per game	APG	Assists per game	SPG	Steals per game
BPG	Blocks per game	PPG	Points per game	PIR	Performance index rating
**Bold**	Career high

=== EuroLeague ===
*	Led the league

Year	Team	GP	GS	MPG	FG%	3P%	FT%	RPG	APG	SPG	BPG	PPG	PIR
2016–17	Baskonia	33	**24**	23.3	.518	.315	.731	**7.0**	1.7	**.6**	.3	**10.1**	**15.0**
2017–18	Baskonia	34	12	21.2	.621	**.577***	.667	4.4	1.6	.4	.3	8.7	11.6
2018–19	Baskonia	33	21	**24.1**	.596	.309	.756	5.8	**2.6**	**.6**	.2	7.5	11.4
2019–20	CSKA Moscow	28*	24	22.2	.563	.410	.571	5.2	1.5	**.6**	.1	7.7	9.4
2020–21	CSKA Moscow	**37**	3	19.3	.611	.464	**.863**	4.9	1.3	.5	.3	8.5	11.4
2021–22	CSKA Moscow	20	13	21.1	**.696**	.395	.800	4.0	2.0	**.6**	**.4**	8.4	10.2
2022–23	Olimpia Milano	30	15	15.7	.407	.320	.529	4.0	1.5	.4	.3	4.9	6.5
2023–24	Olimpia Milano	34	18	20.2	.482	.289	.676	4.4	2.1	.4	**.4**	7.0	9.4
Career		249	130	21.0	.507	.380	.724	5.0	1.8	.5	.3	7.9	10.7

=== FIBA Europe Cup ===
Year	Team	GP	GS	MPG	FG%	3P%	FT%	RPG	APG	SPG	BPG	PPG
2015–16	Skyliners Frankfurt	17	16	24.2	.537	.273	.733	5.8	2.2	.3	.8	11.7
Career		17	16	24.2	.537	.273	.733	5.8	2.2	.3	.8	11.7

=== FIBA EuroChallenge ===
Year	Team	GP	GS	MPG	FG%	3P%	FT%	RPG	APG	SPG	BPG	PPG
2014–15	Skyliners Frankfurt	17	17	26.3	.618	.286	.794	7.2	1.6	.5	.5	16.0
Career		17	17	26.3	.618	.286	.794	7.2	1.6	.5	.5	16.0

=== Domestic leagues ===
Year	Team	League	GP	MPG	FG%	3P%	FT%	RPG	APG	SPG	BPG	PPG
2010–11	(Germany) Jena	ProA	4	5.0	.000	—	.500	2.0	—	—	.3	0.8
2011–12	(Germany) Jena	ProA	25	10.2	.554	.167	.600	2.8	.4	.1	.3	3.9
2012–13	(Germany) Skyliners Juniors	ProB	15	31.0	.570	.182	.660	8.6	3.0	.7	.8	12.2
2012–13	(Germany) Skyliners Frankfurt	BBL	26	9.7	.540	.000	.714	2.1	.4	.2	.1	3.0
2013–14	(Germany) Skyliners Frankfurt	BBL	34	21.5	.546	.462	.758	4.9	1.5	.4	.4	8.1
2014–15	(Germany) Skyliners Frankfurt	BBL	35	26.0	.577	.361	.792	5.9	2.5	.6	.9	12.2
2015–16	(Germany) Skyliners Frankfurt	BBL	36	23.2	.579	.393	.750	5.2	2.2	.6	.6	10.9
2016–17	(Spain) Baskonia	ACB	39	21.6	.502	.317	.647	5.5	1.7	.8	.5	7.4
2017–18	(Spain) Baskonia	ACB	43	20.2	.509	.377	.862	5.1	1.6	.3	.3	7.2
2018–19	(Spain) Baskonia	ACB	35	23.0	.529	.389	.803	5.6	2.4	.8	.3	9.3
2019–20	(Russia) CSKA Moscow	VTBUL	16	18.9	.528	.487	.800	4.0	1.8	.7	.6	8.6
2020–21	(Russia) CSKA Moscow	VTBUL	28	21.5	.551	.425	.760	6.0	2.3	1.0	.5	10.0
2021–22	(Russia) CSKA Moscow	VTBUL	9	18.0	.453	.400	.818	5.4	1.4	.6	.2	8.4
2022–23	(Italy) Olimpia Milano	LBA	34	19.7	.533	.440	.638	4.5	1.6	.6	.2	8.3
2023–24	(Italy) Olimpia Milano	LBA	33	17.8	.521	.328	.536	5.1	1.8	.4	.2	6.4

=== International ===
Tournaments with Germany
Year	Pos.	PPG	RPG	APG
EuroBasket
2015	**18**	8.5	7.0	1.5
Source: FIBA

== Honours ==
- FIBA Europe Cup: 2015–16

=== Individual awards ===
- BBL All-Star: 2015, 2016
- All-BBL Second Team: 2015–16
- BBL Most Improved Player: 2014–15
- BBL Best German Young Player: 2014–15
