= Chris Dowe =

American basketball player (born 1991)

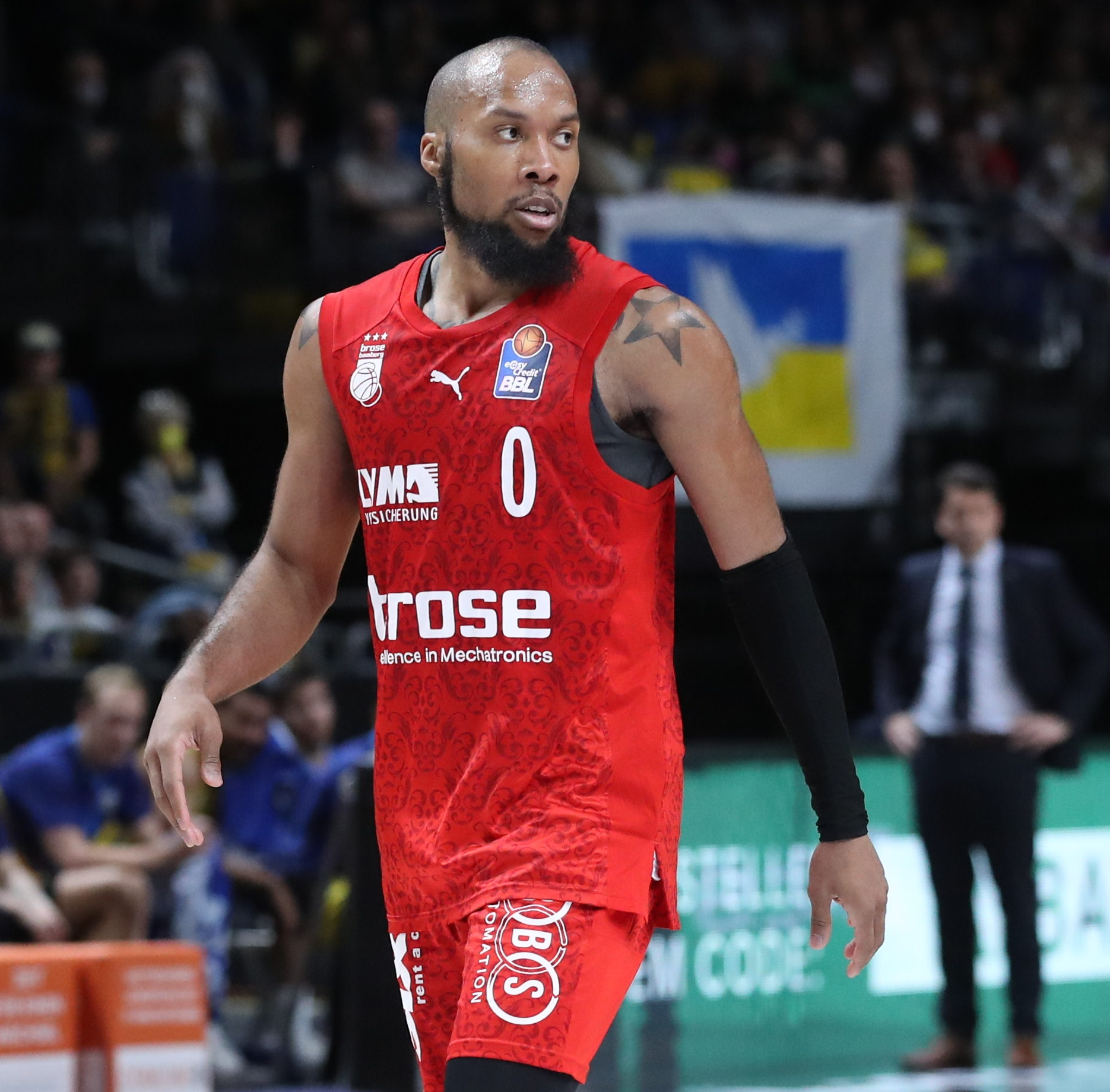
- Dowe with Bamberg in 2022

Free Agent
- Position: Shooting guard

Personal information
- Born: August 26, 1991 (age 35) Louisville, Kentucky, U.S.
- Listed height: 6 ft 3 in (1.91 m)
- Listed weight: 190 lb (86 kg)

Career information
- High school: Eastern (Louisville, Kentucky)
- College: Bellarmine (2009–2013)
- NBA draft: 2013: undrafted
- Playing career: 2013–present

Career history
- 2013–2014: Sampaense
- 2014–2015: Aix-Maurienne
- 2015–2016: Hyères-Toulon
- 2016–2017: Brussels
- 2017–2018: Élan Béarnais Pau-Orthez
- 2018–2019: Ironi Nes Ziona
- 2019–2020: Włocławek
- 2020–2021: Maccabi Haifa
- 2021–2022: Prometey
- 2022: Brose Bamberg
- 2022–2023: Dinamo Sassari
- 2023–2024: Derthona Basket
- 2024–2025: Pallacanestro Brescia

Career highlights
- Polish Cup winner (2019); LNB Pro B champion (2016); First-team All-GLVC (2013); Second-team All-GLVC (2012)

Chris Dowe (born August 26, 1991) is an American professional basketball player who last played for Pallacanestro Brescia of Lega Basket Serie A. He played college basketball for Bellarmine University before playing professionally in Portugal, France, Belgium and Israel. Standing at 6 ft 3 in (1.91 m), he primarily plays at the shooting guard position.

== Early life and college career ==
Dowe attended Eastern High School in Louisville, Kentucky, where he received 7th Region Player of the Year honors, averaging 14.2 points, 4.9 rebounds, 3.0 assists, 1.5 steals, and 1.5 blocks a game. Dowe earned 2nd Team All-State honors and was named MVP of the Louisville Invitational Tournament and the Capital City Tournament.

Dowe played college basketball for Bellarmine University, where he helped the Knights win the 2011 NCAA II Championship. Over his college career, Dowe averaged 14.7 points, 5.0 rebounds, 4.5 assists, and 1.3 steals per game, finishing as the 5th all-time in Bellarmine program history in scoring (1,731), 4th in steals (133), 4th in blocked shots (79), and 2nd in games played (132).

In his senior season (2013) Dowe earned a spot on the First-team All-GLVC.

== Professional career ==
=== Sampaense (2013–2014) ===
On October 4, 2013, Dowe started his professional career with the Portuguese team Sampaense. On January 4, 2014, Dowe recorded a career-high 29 points, shooting 9-of-15 from the field, along with eight rebounds and two steals in a 79–68 win over Maia Basket Clube. Dowe helped Sampaense reach the 2014 Portuguese League Playoffs as the fourth seed, where they eventually were eliminated by Benfica in the Semifinals. Dowe finished the season as the league's third-leading scorer with 19.9 points, while also averaging 5.1 rebounds, 3.9 assists and 2.1 steals per game.

=== Aix-Maurienne (2014–2015) ===
On July 7, 2014, Dowe signed with the French team Aix-Maurienne of the LNB Pro B. In 31 games played for Aix-Maurienne, Dowe averaged 14.2 points, 5.2 rebounds, 2.4 assists and 1.4 steals per game.

=== Hyères-Toulon (2015–2016) ===
On July 2, 2015, Dowe signed with Hyères-Toulon for the 2015–16 season. Dowe helped the team to promote to the LNB Pro A as the LNB Pro B regular season champion.

=== Basic-Fit Brussels (2016–2017) ===
On June 17, 2016, Dowe signed a one-year deal with the Belgian team Basic-Fit Brussels. Dowe helped Brussels reach the 2017 Belgian League Finals, where they eventually lost to Oostende. In 52 games played during the 2016–17 season (both in the FIBA Europe Cup and the Belgian League), Dowe averaged 12.6 points, 5.5 rebounds, 2.6 assists and 1.1 steals per game.

=== Pau-Orthez (2017–2018) ===
On July 7, 2017, Dowe returned to France for second stint, signing a one-year deal with Élan Béarnais Pau-Orthez. Dowe helped Pau-Orthez reach the 2018 Pro A Playoffs as the eighth seed, where they eventually were eliminated by Monaco in the Quarterfinals. In 36 games played during the 2017–18 season, Dowe averaged 10.9 points, 3.9 rebounds, 2.5 assists and 1.2 steals per game.

=== Ironi Nes Ziona (2018–2019) ===
On July 11, 2018, Dowe signed with the Israeli team Ironi Nes Ziona for the 2018–19 season. On January 2, 2019, Dowe recorded a season-high 28 points, shooting 9-of-13 from the field, along with four rebounds and two assists in a 95–93 loss to Maccabi Rishon LeZion. Dowe helped Nes Ziona reach the 2019 Israeli League Playoffs, where they eventually were eliminated by Hapoel Eilat.

=== Anwil Włocławek (2019–2020) ===
On July 24, 2019, Dowe signed with the Polish team Anwil Włocławek for the 2019–20 season.

=== Maccabi Haifa (2020–2021) ===
On July 23, 2020, Dowe signed with the Israeli team Maccabi Haifa for the 2020–21 season.

=== Prometey (2021–2022) ===
On July 19, 2021, he has signed with Prometey of the Ukrainian Basketball SuperLeague. Dowe averaged 10.7 points, 4.0 rebounds, and 2.3 assists per game.

=== Brose Bamberg (2022) ===
On March 7, 2022, Dowe signed with Brose Bamberg of the Basketball Bundesliga.

=== Dinamo Sassari (2022–2023) ===
On June 21, 2022, Dowe signed with Dinamo Sassari of the Italian LBA.

=== Derthona Basket (2023–2024) ===
On June 16, 2023, he signed with Derthona Basket of the Italian Lega Basket Serie A (LBA).

=== Derthona Basket (2024–2025) ===
On July 6, 2024, he signed with Pallacanestro Brescia of Lega Basket Serie A.
