= Matteo Spagnolo =

Italian basketball player (born 2003)

- Spagnolo with Baskonia in 2026

No. 10 – Saski Baskonia
- Position: Shooting guard / point guard
- League: Liga ACB; EuroLeague

Personal information
- Born: 10 January 2003 (age 23) Brindisi, Italy
- Listed height: 1.97 m (6 ft 6 in)
- Listed weight: 89 kg (196 lb)

Career information
- NBA draft: 2022: 2nd round, 50th overall pick
- Drafted by: Minnesota Timberwolves
- Playing career: 2017–present

Career history
- 2017–2018: Stella Azzurra
- 2018–2023: Real Madrid
- 2019–2021: →Real Madrid B
- 2021–2022: →Vanoli Cremona
- 2022–2023: →Aquila Basket Trento
- 2023–2025: Alba Berlin
- 2025–present: Baskonia

Career highlights
- Spanish Cup winner (2026)
- Stats at Basketball Reference
Medals
Men's basketball
Representing Italy
FIBA U16 European Championship
| Bronze medal – third place | 2019 Italy | Team |

Matteo Spagnolo (born 10 January 2003) is an Italian professional basketball player for Saski Baskonia of the Spanish Liga ACB and the EuroLeague.

== Early life and career ==
Spagnolo started playing basketball at the age of four and began his youth career with Aurora Brindisi. At age 12, he scored 78 points and 77 points in the semifinal and final of the regional under-14 championship, respectively.

At Adidas Next Generation Tournament Munich in January 2020, Spagnolo averaged 9.5 points, 4.3 rebounds, and 3.3 assists per game, helping Real Madrid's under-18 team win the title.

== Professional career ==
=== Stella Azzurra (2017–2018) ===
At 13 years of age, Spagnolo moved to Rome to join Stella Azzurra. He made his Serie B debut at age 14, becoming the youngest Italian to play at the senior level.

=== Real Madrid (2018–2023) ===
On 2 May 2018, Spagnolo moved to Spanish powerhouse Real Madrid, where he became the first Italian to join the club's youth academy.

On 8 March 2020, Spagnolo made his senior debut for Real Madrid, playing 36 seconds in a Liga ACB loss to Zaragoza.

Spagnolo mainly spent the 2019-2020 and 2020-2021 campaigns with the club's reserve team.

=== Vanoli Cremona (2021–2022) ===
For the 2021–22 season Spagnolo was transferred on loan to Vanoli Cremona of the Italian Serie A.

=== Aquila Basket Trento (2022–2023) ===
On 28 July 2022, Spagnolo was sent on loan to Italian club Aquila Basket Trento. In 13 EuroCup matches, he averaged 11.8 points, 3.6 rebounds and 4.3 assists in 26 minutes per contest.

=== Alba Berlin (2023–2025) ===
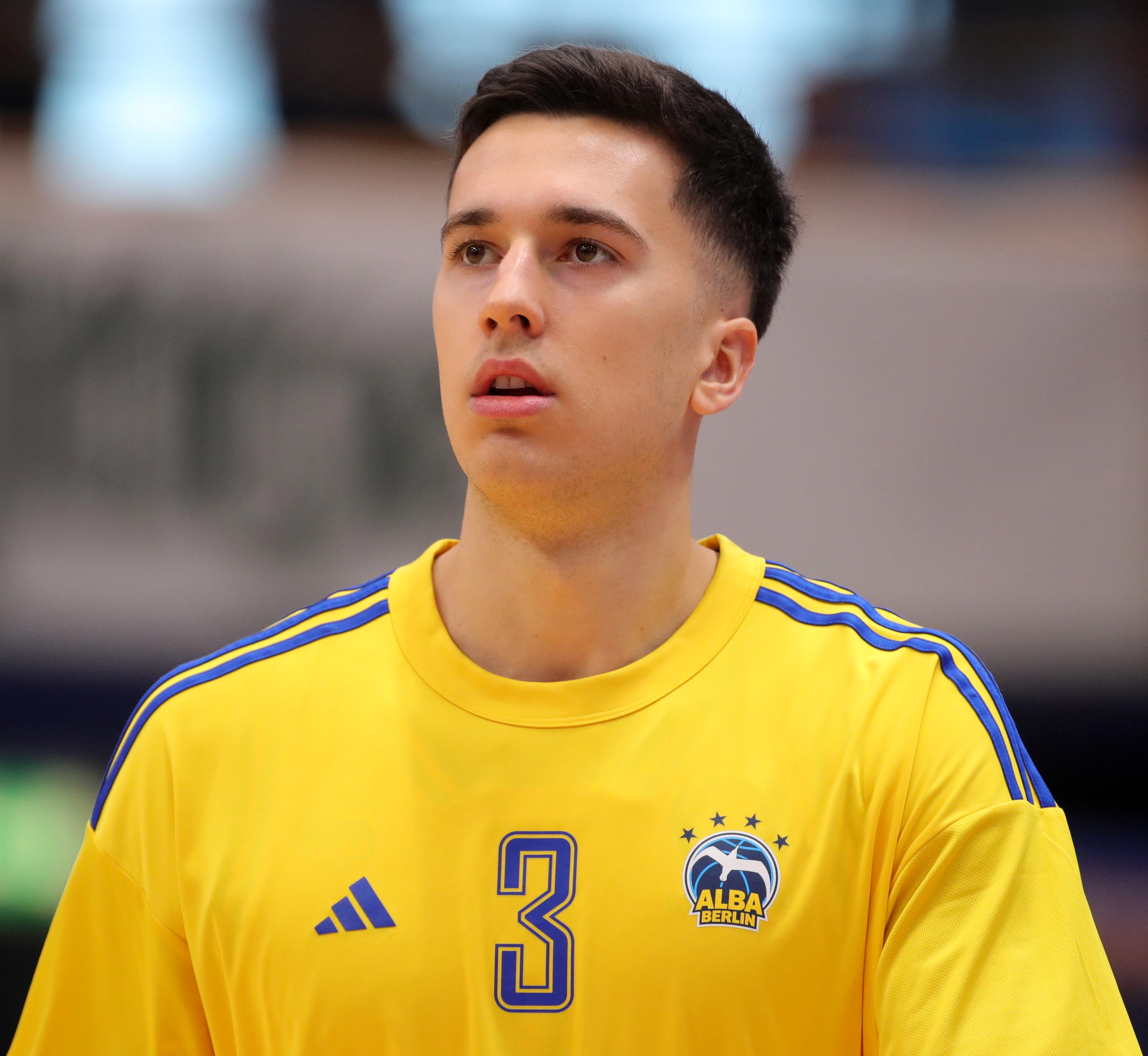
Spagnolo with Alba Berlin in 2023

On 9 August 2023, Spagnolo signed a three-year contract with German club Alba Berlin.

=== Baskonia (2025–present) ===
On July 28, 2025, Spagnolo signed a three season contract with Baskonia of the Liga ACB.

=== NBA draft rights ===
Spagnolo was drafted with the 50th overall pick in the 2022 NBA draft by the Minnesota Timberwolves. In 2023, he appeared in the NBA Summer League with the Timberwolves, averaging 12.5 points and 3 assists per game. On July 10, 2026, his draft rights were traded to the Charlotte Hornets.

== Career statistics ==
Legend
| GP | Games played | GS | Games started | MPG | Minutes per game |
| FG% | Field-goal percentage | 3P% | 3-point field-goal percentage | FT% | Free-throw percentage |
| RPG | Rebounds per game | APG | Assists per game | SPG | Steals per game |
| BPG | Blocks per game | PPG | Points per game | PIR | Performance index rating |
| **Bold** | Career high |

=== EuroLeague ===
| Year | Team | GP | GS | MPG | FG% | 3P% | FT% | RPG | APG | SPG | BPG | PPG | PIR |
|---|---|---|---|---|---|---|---|---|---|---|---|---|---|
| 2023–24 | Alba Berlin | 25 | 17 | 20.5 | .390 | .222 | .878 | 2.2 | 3.4 | .3 | — | 7.3 | 6.1 |
| Career | | 25 | 17 | 20.5 | .390 | .222 | .878 | 2.2 | 3.4 | .3 | — | 7.3 | 6.1 |

=== EuroCup ===
| Year | Team | GP | GS | MPG | FG% | 3P% | FT% | RPG | APG | SPG | BPG | PPG | PIR |
|---|---|---|---|---|---|---|---|---|---|---|---|---|---|
| 2022–23 | Aquila Trento | 13 | 7 | 26.4 | .410 | .278 | .829 | 3.6 | 4.3 | .9 | .1 | 11.8 | 12.3 |
| Career | | 13 | 7 | 26.4 | .410 | .278 | .829 | 3.6 | 4.3 | .9 | .1 | 11.8 | 12.3 |

=== Domestic leagues ===
| Year | Team | League | GP | MPG | FG% | 3P% | FT% | RPG | APG | SPG | BPG | PPG |
|---|---|---|---|---|---|---|---|---|---|---|---|---|
| 2019–20 | (Spain) Real Madrid | ACB | 1 | 0.6 | — | — | — | — | — | — | — | 0.0 |
| 2021–22 | (Italy) Vanoli Cremona | LBA | 25 | 27.0 | .440 | .441 | .861 | 2.9 | 3.5 | 2.6 | .8 | 12.2 |
| 2022–23 | (Italy) Aquila Trento | LBA | 28 | 24.1 | .433 | .295 | .776 | 3.8 | 3.0 | .9 | .1 | 12.5 |
| 2023–24 | (Germany) Alba Berlin | BBL | 16 | 20.6 | .439 | .333 | .762 | 2.6 | 3.7 | .7 | — | 8.7 |

== National team career ==
Spagnolo averaged 16.3 points, 6.7 rebounds, three steals and 2.6 assists per game for Italy at the 2019 FIBA U16 European Championship in Udine. He was named to the All-Star Five after helping his team earn the bronze medal. On 20 February 2020, at age 17, Spagnolo made his senior debut for Italy, scoring three points in a win over Russia at the EuroBasket qualification stage. He became the third-youngest player to play for Italy's senior team.
