= Shabazz Napier =

American basketball player (born 1991)

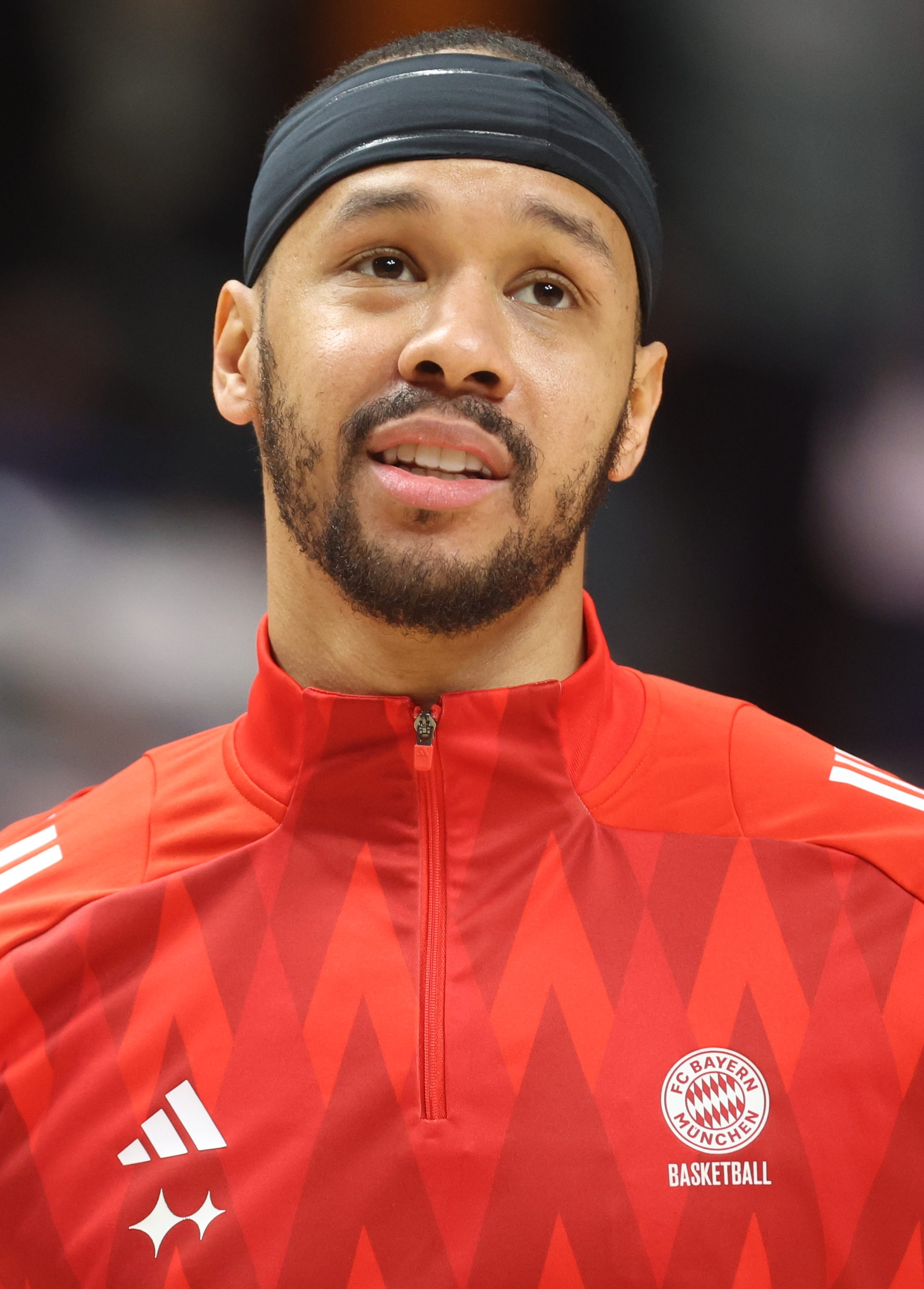
- Napier with Bayern Munich in 2025

Washington Wizards
- Title: Coaching apprentice
- League: NBA

Personal information
- Born: July 14, 1991 (age 35) Boston, Massachusetts, U.S.
- Listed height: 6 ft 0 in (1.83 m)
- Listed weight: 175 lb (79 kg)

Career information
- High school: Charlestown (Boston, Massachusetts); Lawrence Academy (Groton, Massachusetts)
- College: UConn (2010–2014)
- NBA draft: 2014: 1st round, 24th overall pick
- Drafted by: Charlotte Hornets
- Playing career: 2014–2025
- Position: Point guard
- Number: 13, 6, 5

Career history

Playing
- 2014–2015: Miami Heat
- 2014–2015: →Sioux Falls Skyforce
- 2015–2016: Orlando Magic
- 2016–2018: Portland Trail Blazers
- 2018–2019: Brooklyn Nets
- 2019–2020: Minnesota Timberwolves
- 2020: Washington Wizards
- 2021–2022: Zenit Saint Petersburg
- 2022–2023: Mexico City Capitanes
- 2023: Olimpia Milano
- 2023: Crvena zvezda
- 2023–2024: Olimpia Milano
- 2024–2025: Bayern Munich

Coaching
- 2025–present: Washington Wizards (apprentice)

Career highlights
- 2× LBA champion (2023, 2024); Bundesliga champion (2025); Bundesliga Finals MVP (2025); 2× NCAA champion (2011, 2014); NCAA Final Four Most Outstanding Player (2014); Consensus first-team All-American (2014); Bob Cousy Award (2014); AAC Player of the Year (2014); First-team All-AAC (2014); First-team All-Big East (2013)

Career statistics
- Points: 2,433 (7.1 ppg)
- Rebounds: 657 (1.9 rpg)
- Assists: 849 (2.5 apg)
- Stats at NBA.com
- Stats at Basketball Reference

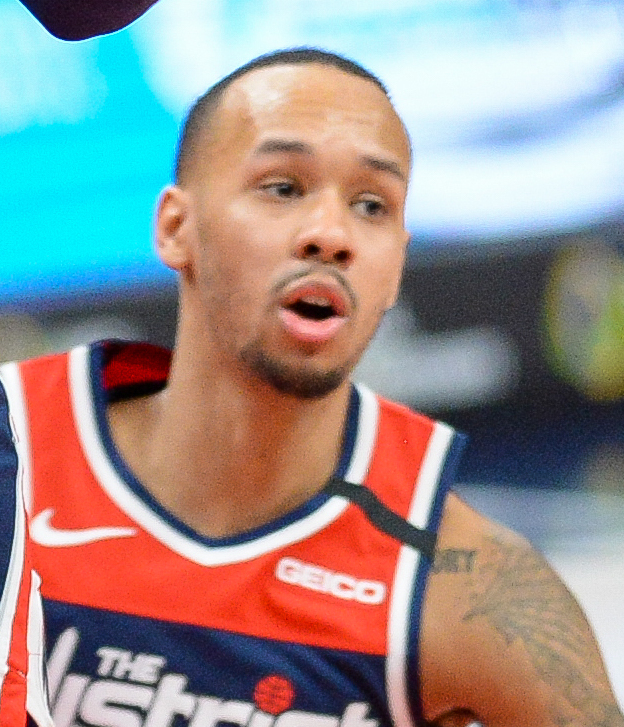
Napier with the Washington Wizards in 2020

Shabazz Bozie Napier (born July 14, 1991) is a Puerto Rican former professional basketball player who currently serves as a coaching apprentice for the Washington Wizards of the National Basketball Association (NBA). He was drafted 24th overall by the Charlotte Hornets in the 2014 NBA draft and immediately traded to the Miami Heat. He played college basketball for the Connecticut Huskies, and won two national championships in 2011 and 2014. Napier was a key player for the Huskies' 2010–11 NCAA championship team, as he made the Big East All Rookie team. Following his junior season, Napier was selected to the All-Big East first team.

In the 2013–14 season, Napier was unanimously selected for the All-AAC first team, and was named the inaugural American Athletic Conference Player of the Year. He was again one of UConn's key players when they won the NCAA tournament for a second time in four years in 2014 and was named as the tournament's most outstanding player.

== Early life ==
Napier was born in the Roxbury neighborhood of Boston to Carmen Velásquez, a native of Puerto Rico, and Alex Napier, who is African American. He has an older sister Titania and an older brother Timmie. He grew up in Boston's Mission Hill neighborhood, and took a liking to basketball during that period.

== High school career ==
Napier attended his first two years of high school at Charlestown High School in Boston's Charlestown neighborhood before transferring to Lawrence Academy in Groton, Massachusetts and reclassifying as a junior. As a senior, Napier led Lawrence Academy to an undefeated season going 29–0 in 2010, as they won the New England Prep Class C title after defeating St. Mark's finishing with 23 points, 8 steals, and 8 assists as he was named Tournament MVP.

Considered a four-star recruit by Rivals.com, Napier was listed as the No. 25 point guard and the No. 98 player in the nation in 2010.

In January 2014, Charlestown High School retired Napier's jersey.

== College career ==
=== Freshman season ===
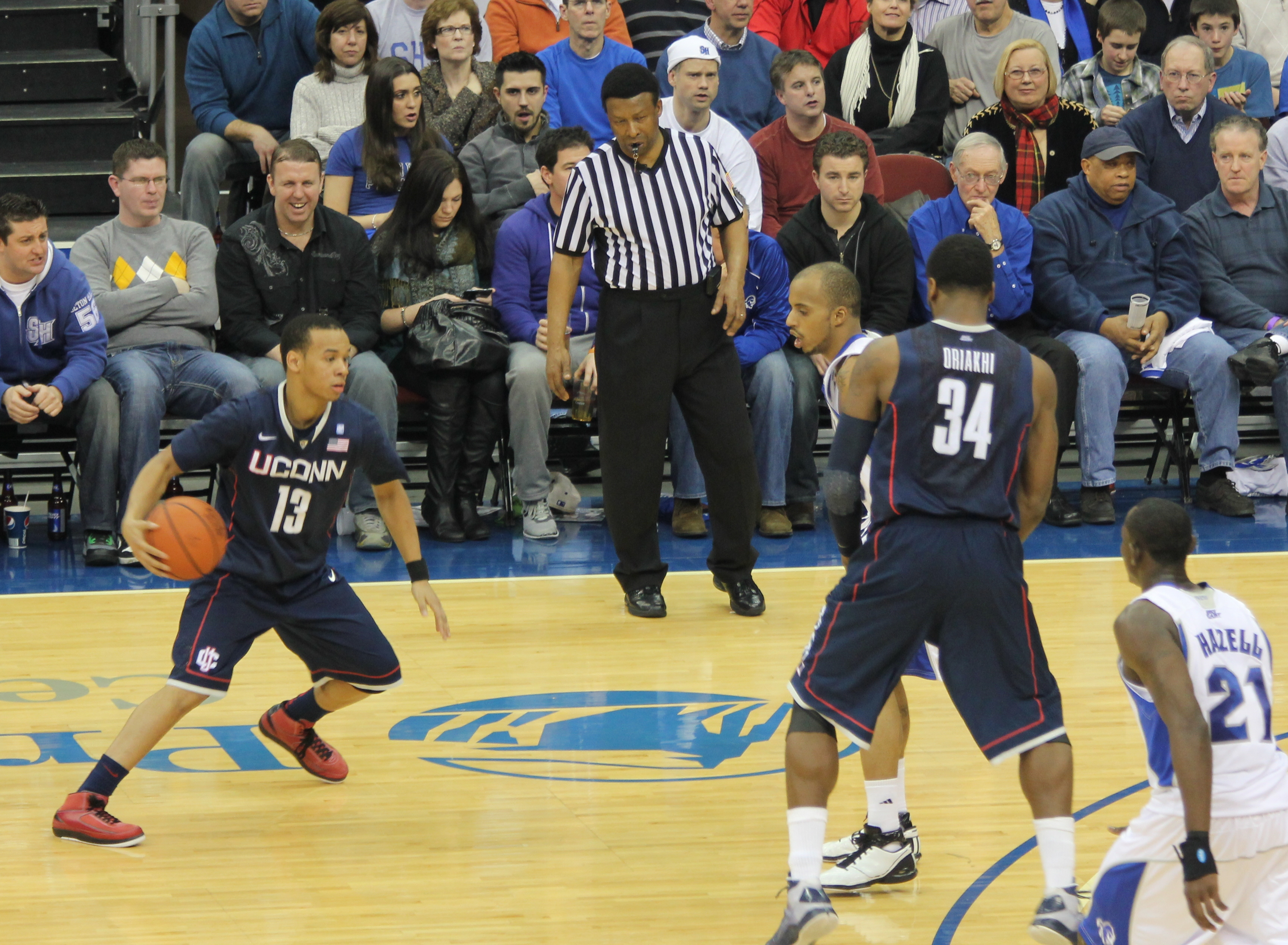
Napier dribbling around a pick and roll play setup by teammate Alex Oriakhi.

Following his prep career, Napier chose to play at the University of Connecticut under coach Jim Calhoun. He had a solid freshman year in 2010–11 backing up Kemba Walker. He appeared in all 41 games for the Huskies, coming off the bench averaging 7.8 points, 3.0 assists and 1.8 steals per game for the season. At the end of the regular season, Napier was named to the Big East All-Rookie team along with teammate Jeremy Lamb.

Napier hit two game clinching free throws to secure a win in the Final Four against Kentucky. Napier's contribution to the team was significant, as Connecticut finished the season 32–9 (9–9 in conference play) and won both the Big East Conference Championship and National Championship in 2011.

=== Sophomore season ===
During the summer after his freshman year, Napier was invited to the trials for the 2011 World University Games team. Moving into the starting lineup as a sophomore for Connecticut, Napier was a preseason honorable mention All-Big East pick and a Bob Cousy Award candidate. His numbers improved, as Napier averaged 13.0 points, 5.8 assists, 3.5 rebounds, and 1.6 steals per game.

Napier notched his first career triple-double (the ninth in Connecticut men's basketball history) as he tallied 22 points, 12 rebounds and 13 assists against Coppin State on November 20, 2011. Connecticut earned a 9 seed in the NCAA Tournament, but fell short to Iowa State as the Huskies finished the season going 20–14 (8–10 in conference play). Before his junior season started, Napier considered transferring after Jim Calhoun's retirement and the team's postseason ban next season, but chose to return. Connecticut hired assistant coach Kevin Ollie to replace Calhoun as head coach.

=== Junior season ===
Following his return, Napier along with backcourt teammate Ryan Boatright both rose to the national spotlight as they were highlighted as one of the nation's best backcourts, as the two averaged a combined 33 points and 9 assists per game, outplaying nearly every opponents' backcourt they played. He also scored his 1000th career point in a game against DePaul. Napier excelled in overtime play, scoring 55 points in 45 minutes of overtime play, as he led them to a school record 5 overtime wins. Napier averaged 17.1 points, 4.6 assists, 4.4 rebounds, and 2.0 steals a game.

Following the end of the regular season, Napier made the All-USBWA District 1 team, and was the USBWA District I Player of the Year. Napier was then chosen to the Big East All First Team, was an honorable mention for Big East Player of the Year. He led the Huskies under first year coach Kevin Ollie to a 20–10 record (10–8 in conference play) despite having no postseason eligibility.

=== Senior season ===
On April 26, 2013, Napier opted to return to the team for his senior year along with teammates Ryan Boatright and DeAndre Daniels. Napier said the reason he and his teammates returned is because Napier wanted to get his degree and for him and his teammates to return to the NCAA Tournament. Napier was named as a candidate for the Wooden Award, Bob Cousy Award, Naismith Award, Senior Class Award, and Oscar Robertson Trophy. Napier recorded his 2nd career triple-double (10th in UConn history) with 14 points, 11 rebounds, and 10 assists on November 11, 2013. Napier led the team to win the 2K Sports Classic Title and was named Tournament MVP. In a game against Florida, Napier hit the game winning shot as time expired. Following the end of the regular season, Napier was named a unanimous selection for the AAC All-First team, and was awarded the inaugural AAC Player of the Year. He was named the USBWA District I Player of the Year for the second straight season, and was named a first team All-American on the Wooden team, Associated Press team, USBWA and NABC, and a second team member for Sporting News. In the AAC Tournament, Napier was named to the All-Tournament team after leading the Huskies to the championship game before falling to Louisville.

In the NCAA Tournament, Connecticut earned a 7 seed as Napier led them under second year coach Kevin Ollie past St. Joseph's, Villanova, Iowa State, and won the East Regional final defeating Michigan State as Napier was named the East Regional Most Outstanding Player. Napier continued to lead the Huskies through the Final Four defeating Florida before reaching the National Championship game. On April 6, Napier was named the Bob Cousy Point Guard of the Year award winner. On April 7, Napier and the Huskies defeated Kentucky 60–54 in the National Championship game and Napier was named Most Outstanding Player. Connecticut finished the season 32–8 overall (12–6 in conference play), and Napier averaged 18.0 points, 5.9 rebounds, 4.9 assists, and 1.8 steals per game. Napier was later inducted into the Huskies of Honor.

Napier, along with UConn teammates Niels Giffey and Tyler Olander, are the only Division I men's players in history to have won national championships as both freshmen and seniors. He is the only player in UConn history with 1,500 points, 500 rebounds, 500 assists, and 250 steals in his career. He finished his career in fourth place on the UConn scoring list with 1,959 points, second all-time with 260 made three-point field goals and steals with 251, first in 143 games played and free throws made with 509, and third in school history with 646 assists.

== Professional career ==
=== Miami Heat (2014–2015) ===
On June 26, 2014, Napier was selected with the 24th overall pick in the 2014 NBA draft by the Charlotte Hornets. He was later traded to the Miami Heat on draft night. On July 18, 2014, he signed with the Heat after averaging 10.2 points in four Summer League games for the team. On December 13, 2014, he was assigned to the Sioux Falls Skyforce of the NBA Development League. He was recalled on December 15, reassigned on December 30, and recalled again on January 7. On February 20, he had a season-best game with 18 points, 7 rebounds and 6 assists in a 111–87 win over the New York Knicks.

On April 1, 2015, Napier was ruled out for the rest of the season after undergoing successful surgery to repair a sports hernia. He recovered in time to join the Heat's summer league team in July to compete in Orlando and Las Vegas.

=== Orlando Magic (2015–2016) ===
On July 27, 2015, Napier was traded to the Orlando Magic, along with cash considerations, in exchange for a conditional 2016 second-round draft pick. On November 11, 2015, he scored a career-high 22 points in a 101–99 win over the Los Angeles Lakers.

=== Portland Trail Blazers (2016–2018) ===
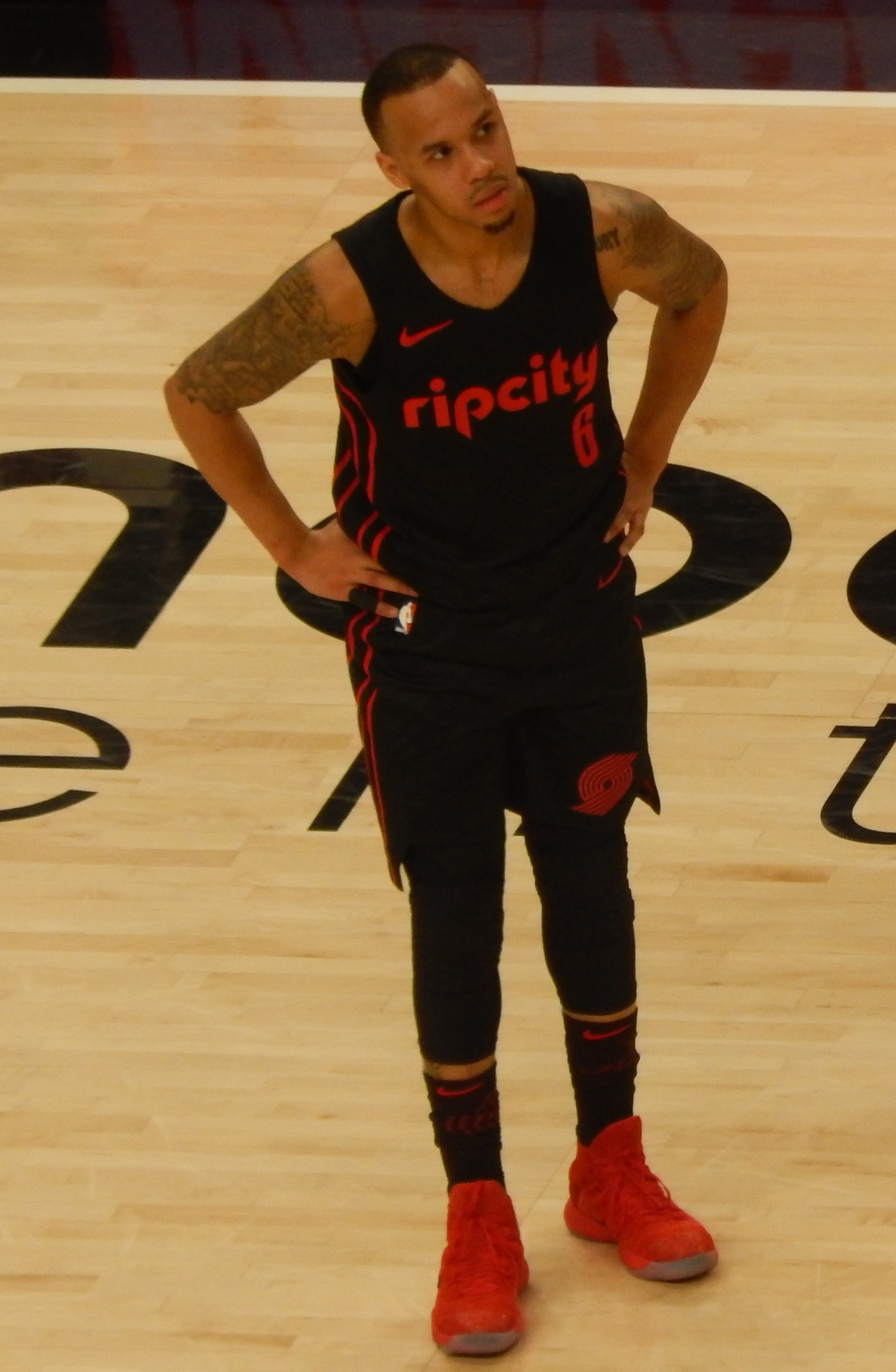
Napier with the Portland Trail Blazers in 2018

On July 7, 2016, Napier was traded to the Portland Trail Blazers in exchange for cash considerations. On April 10, 2017, he scored a career-high 32 points in a 99–98 win over the San Antonio Spurs.

On December 28, 2017, Napier, who started for the injured Damian Lillard, scored 15 of his season-high 23 points in the fourth quarter to help the Trail Blazers rally for a 114–110 victory over the Philadelphia 76ers.

=== Brooklyn Nets (2018–2019) ===
On July 17, 2018, Napier signed a two-year, $3.8 million contract with the Brooklyn Nets. On December 29, he tied his career high with 32 points on 9-of-15 shooting from the field and 10 of 12 from the foul line in a 129–115 loss to the Milwaukee Bucks. On January 11 against the Toronto Raptors, he extended his streak of games with at least 10 points to a career-high eight. On February 6, he recorded his first career double-double with 10 points and 11 assists in a 135–130 win over the Denver Nuggets. He ended the season with averages of 9.4 points, 1.8 rebounds and 2.6 assists in 17.6 minutes.

=== Minnesota Timberwolves (2019–2020) ===
On July 7, 2019, Napier, Treveon Graham, and D'Angelo Russell were sent to the Golden State Warriors as part of a trade package for Kevin Durant. The following day, Napier and Graham were traded to the Minnesota Timberwolves in exchange for the draft rights to Lior Eliyahu.

=== Washington Wizards (2020) ===
On February 5, 2020, the Timberwolves traded Napier to the Denver Nuggets in a four-team trade. Napier was traded to the Washington Wizards the following day, in exchange for Jordan McRae.

=== Zenit Saint Petersburg (2021–2022) ===
On July 19, 2021, Napier agreed on a one-year deal with Russian club Zenit Saint Petersburg. On February 27, 2022, he unilaterally terminated contract with Zenit, citing Russia's aggression on Ukraine as the reason.

=== Mexico City Capitanes (2022–2023) ===
On November 4, 2022, Napier was named to the opening night roster for the Mexico City Capitanes.

=== Olimpia Milano (2023) ===
On January 28, 2023, he signed with Olimpia Milano of the Italian Lega Basket Serie A (LBA).

=== Crvena zvezda (2023) ===
On July 16, 2023, Napier signed a two-year deal with Serbian powerhouse Crvena zvezda. His brief time in Serbia was marked by numerous controversies and extremely poor play, with many media sources eventually pointing out that Napier used various tricks and excuses to effectively place himself on a sabbatical leave during which he refused to play against any other prospective team that might hire him in the future. In December of the same year, he had a public fallout with new head coach Ioannis Sfairopoulos and fell out of the rotation. Eventually he was released from his contract on the condition that he signs only with his former club Olimpia Milano.

=== Return to Olimpia Milano (2023–2024) ===
On December 21, 2023, Napier signed back with Olimpia Milano under coach Ettore Messina.

=== Bayern Munich (2024–2025) ===
On September 4, 2024, Napier signed with Bayern Munich of the German Basketball Bundesliga (BBL) and the EuroLeague. On August 17, 2025, Napier parted ways with the German club.

== National team career ==
Napier's mother and manager, Carmen Velásquez, is Puerto Rican, which made him directly eligible to represent Puerto Rico under FIBA regulations.

On February 19, 2012, it was announced that following formal meetings with personnel of the Puerto Rican Basketball Federation, he had presented the required documentation and agreed to join the Puerto Rico national basketball team's practice for its next tournament, the 2012 Centrobasket.

This tournament served as qualifier for the 2013 FIBA Americas Tournament. He did not participate in the 2012 Centrobasket due to injury.

In December 2013, the then Puerto Rico men's national basketball team coach Paco Olmos held a meeting with Napier and Velásquez, where his program was explained. The coach referred to this meeting as "constructive" and later noted that both sides kept good communication.

When questioned about the possibility of joining Puerto Rico in 2014, Napier responded by saying "I would love to go and have that experience. It would be something unique and that will definitely help my game for the goals I have set. It will be an honor. [...] Everything I am today as a player, I owe to [UCONN]. And as a person, to the education of my mother, who would be proud if I play for Puerto Rico."

== Coaching career ==
On October 20, 2025, the Washington Wizards hired Napier to serve as a coaching apprentice under head coach Brian Keefe.

== Career statistics ==
Legend
GP	Games played	GS	Games started	MPG	Minutes per game
FG%	Field-goal percentage	3P%	3-point field-goal percentage	FT%	Free-throw percentage
RPG	Rebounds per game	APG	Assists per game	SPG	Steals per game
BPG	Blocks per game	PPG	Points per game	PIR	Performance index rating
**Bold**	Career high

=== NBA ===
==== Regular season ====
Year	Team	GP	GS	MPG	FG%	3P%	FT%	RPG	APG	SPG	BPG	PPG
2014–15	Miami	51	**10**	19.8	.382	.364	.786	2.2	2.5	.8	.1	5.1
2015–16	Orlando	55	0	10.9	.338	.327	.733	1.0	1.8	.4	.0	3.7
2016–17	Portland	53	2	9.7	.399	.370	.776	1.2	1.3	.6	.0	4.1
2017–18	Portland	**74**	10	20.7	.420	**.376**	**.841**	2.3	2.0	**1.1**	.2	8.7
2018–19	Brooklyn	56	2	17.6	.389	.333	.833	1.8	2.6	.7	**.3**	9.4
2019–20	Minnesota	36	**22**	23.8	.403	.296	.818	**3.1**	**5.2**	**1.1**	.2	9.6
2019–20	Washington	20	10	**24.4**	**.428**	.358	.831	2.4	3.8	1.5	.2	**11.6**
Career		345	56	17.4	.397	.345	.815	1.9	2.5	.8	.1	7.1

==== Playoffs ====
Year	Team	GP	GS	MPG	FG%	3P%	FT%	RPG	APG	SPG	BPG	PPG
2017	Portland	**4**	0	11.8	.421	.455	.750	1.0	.8	.5	—	6.8
2018	Portland	2	0	**17.5**	.455	.000	.500	1.0	1.5	**1.5**	—	5.5
2019	Brooklyn	3	0	9.3	**.636**	**.600**	**.875**	**2.3**	**3.7**	.3	—	**8.0**
Career		9	0	12.2	.488	.400	.778	1.4	1.9	.7	—	6.9

=== EuroLeague ===
Year	Team	GP	GS	MPG	FG%	3P%	FT%	RPG	APG	SPG	BPG	PPG	PIR
2022–23	Olimpia Milano	12	10	24.8	**.455**	**.456**	**.875**	1.8	3.9	1.1	—	**15.0**	**16.4**
2023–24	Olimpia Milano	**16**	**16**	**27.1**	.361	.284	.852	**2.5**	**4.0**	1.1	—	10.9	11.4
2023–24	Crvena zvezda	12	7	17.7	.367	.305	.826	1.7	2.3	**1.3**	—	9.8	7.8
Career		40	33	23.6	.391	.344	.857	2.0	3.5	1.2	—	11.8	11.8

=== Domestic leagues ===
Year	Team	League	GP	MPG	FG%	3P%	FT%	RPG	APG	SPG	BPG	PPG
2014–15	(United States) Sioux Falls Skyforce	D-League	4	34.0	.419	.450	.810	4.7	3.5	.7	.2	19.5
2022–23	Mexico City Capitanes	G League	10	29.8	.472	.464	.816	2.3	4.6	2.0	.3	22.3
2022–23	(Italy) Olimpia Milano	LBA	26	24.8	.421	.383	.852	2.6	3.9	1.2	.0	14.5
2023–24	(Serbia) Crvena zvezda	ABA	9	21.0	.451	.350	.870	1.8	4.4	1.6	—	10.9
2023–24	(Italy) Olimpia Milano	LBA	27	25.8	.493	.449	.835	1.9	4.0	1.2	.1	13.1

=== College ===
Year	Team	GP	GS	MPG	FG%	3P%	FT%	RPG	APG	SPG	BPG	PPG
2010–11	Connecticut	**41**	0	23.8	.370	.326	.771	2.4	3.0	1.6	.1	7.8
2011–12	Connecticut	34	31	35.0	.389	.355	.743	3.5	**5.8**	1.6	**.3**	13.0
2012–13	Connecticut	28	26	**37.3**	**.441**	.398	.819	4.4	4.6	**2.0**	.1	17.1
2013–14	Connecticut	40	**40**	35.1	.429	**.405**	**.870**	**5.9**	4.9	1.8	**.3**	**18.0**
Career		143	98	32.3	.411	.375	.813	4.0	4.5	1.8	.2	13.7
