= 2022–23 Fenerbahçe S.K. (basketball) season =

Turkish professional basketball team season

Fenerbahçe Beko
2022–23 season
- President: Ali Koç
- Head coach: Dimitris Itoudis
- Arena: Ülker Sports and Event Hall
- Basketbol Süper Ligi: 2nd seed
- Playoffs: Semifinals
- EuroLeague: 8th seed
- Playoffs: Quarterfinals
- Presidential Cup: Runners-up
- Turkish Basketball Cup: Suspended
- PIR leader: (United States) Hayes 15.1
- Scoring leader: (United States) Motley 15.4
- Rebounding leader: (United States) Motley 5.8
- Assists leader: (Greece) Calathes 5.8
Home	Away

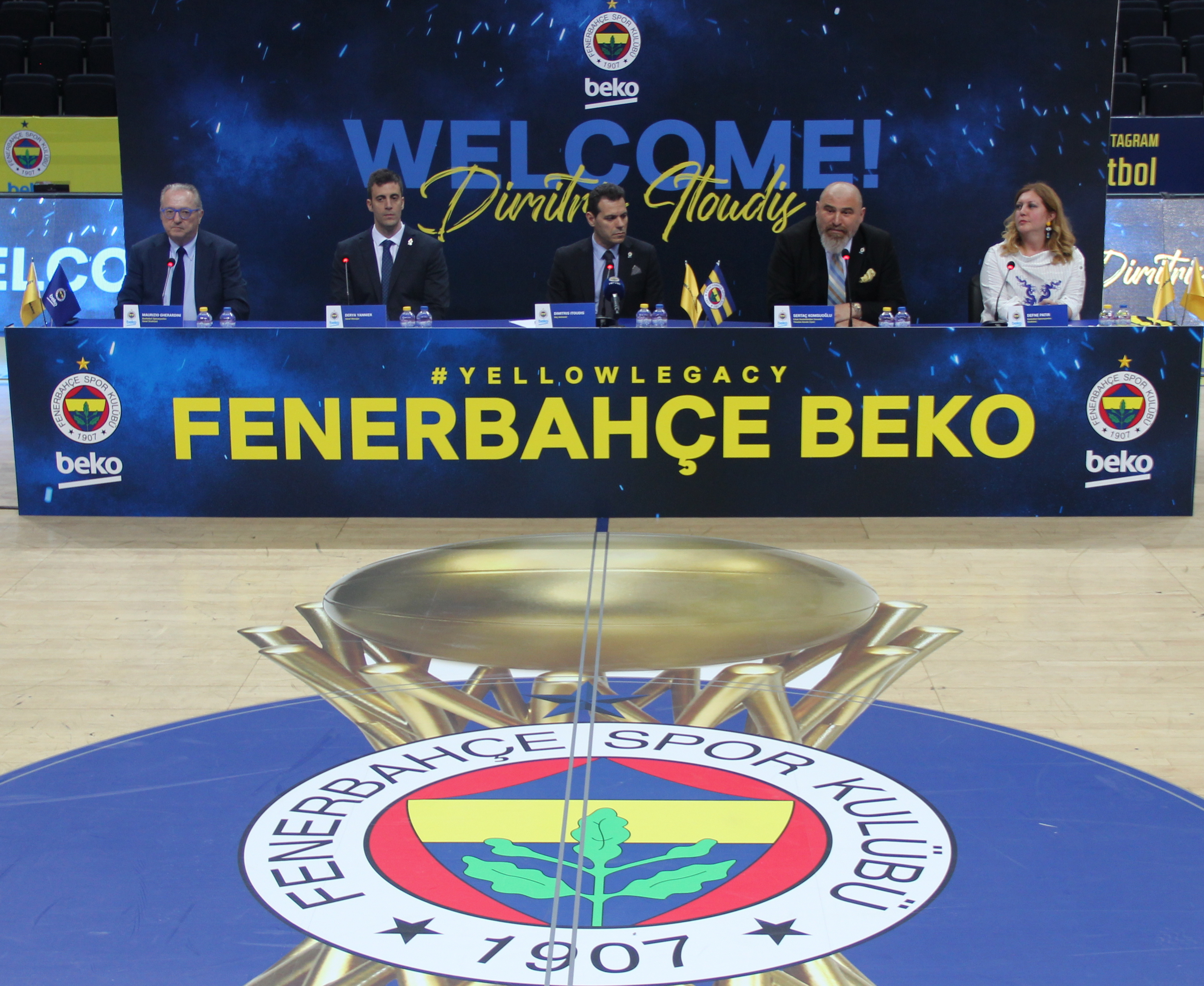
Dimitrios Itoudis signing ceremony in June 2022

The 2022–23 season was Fenerbahçe's 109th season in the existence of the club. The team played in the Basketball Super League and in the EuroLeague.

== Club ==
=== Board of directors ===
Position	Staff
Chairman	(Turkey) Ali Koç
Deputy Chairman	(Turkey) Erol Bilecik
General Secretary	(Turkey) Burak Çağlan Kızılhan
Board Member	(Turkey) Mehmet Dereli
Board Member	(Turkey) Fethi Pekin
Board Member	(Turkey) Acar Sertaç Komsuoğlu
Board Member	(Turkey) Simla Türker Bayazıt
Board Member	(Turkey) Hüseyin Arslan
Board Member	(Turkey) Esin Güral Argat
Board Member	(Turkey) Ahmet Ketenci
Board Member	(Turkey) Mustafa Kemal Danabaş
Board Member	(Turkey) Agah Ruşen Çetin
Board Member	(Turkey) Selma Altay Rodopman
Board Member	(Turkey) Ömer Okan
Board Member	(Turkey) Selahattin Baki

Last updated: 6 March 2023
Source: Fenerbahce.org

=== Staff ===
Position	Staff
General Director	(Italy) Maurizio Gherardini
Head Coach	(Greece) Dimitris Itoudis
General Manager	(Turkey) Derya Yannier
Team Manager	(Turkey) Cenk Renda
Director of Basketball Operations	(Turkey) Defne Patır
Finance Officer	(Turkey) Murat Gök
Communication and Media Specialist	(Turkey) İlker Üçer
Social Media Manager	(Turkey) Gökhan Deniz
Marketing Manager	(Turkey) Ahmet Mert Gündüz
Ticketing Officer	(Turkey) Evren Gençoğlu
Assistant Coach	(Greece) Stefanos Dedas
Assistant Coach	(Slovenia) Radovan Trifunović
Assistant Coach	(Turkey) Alp Timuçin Yener
Conditioner	(Greece) Kostas Chatzichristos
Conditioner	(Turkey) İlker Belgutay
Doctor	(Turkey) Dr. Ahmet Kulduk
Physiotherapist	(Turkey) Rıza Özdemir
Physiotherapist	(Turkey) Berkay Güzel
Physiotherapist	(Greece) Kosmas Kontogiannis
Masseur	(Turkey) Yılmaz Mete
Masseur	(Turkey) Faik Özköksal
Equipment Manager	(Turkey) Erkan Karaca

Last updated: 6 March 2023
Source: Fenerbahce.org

== Players ==
=== Squad information ===
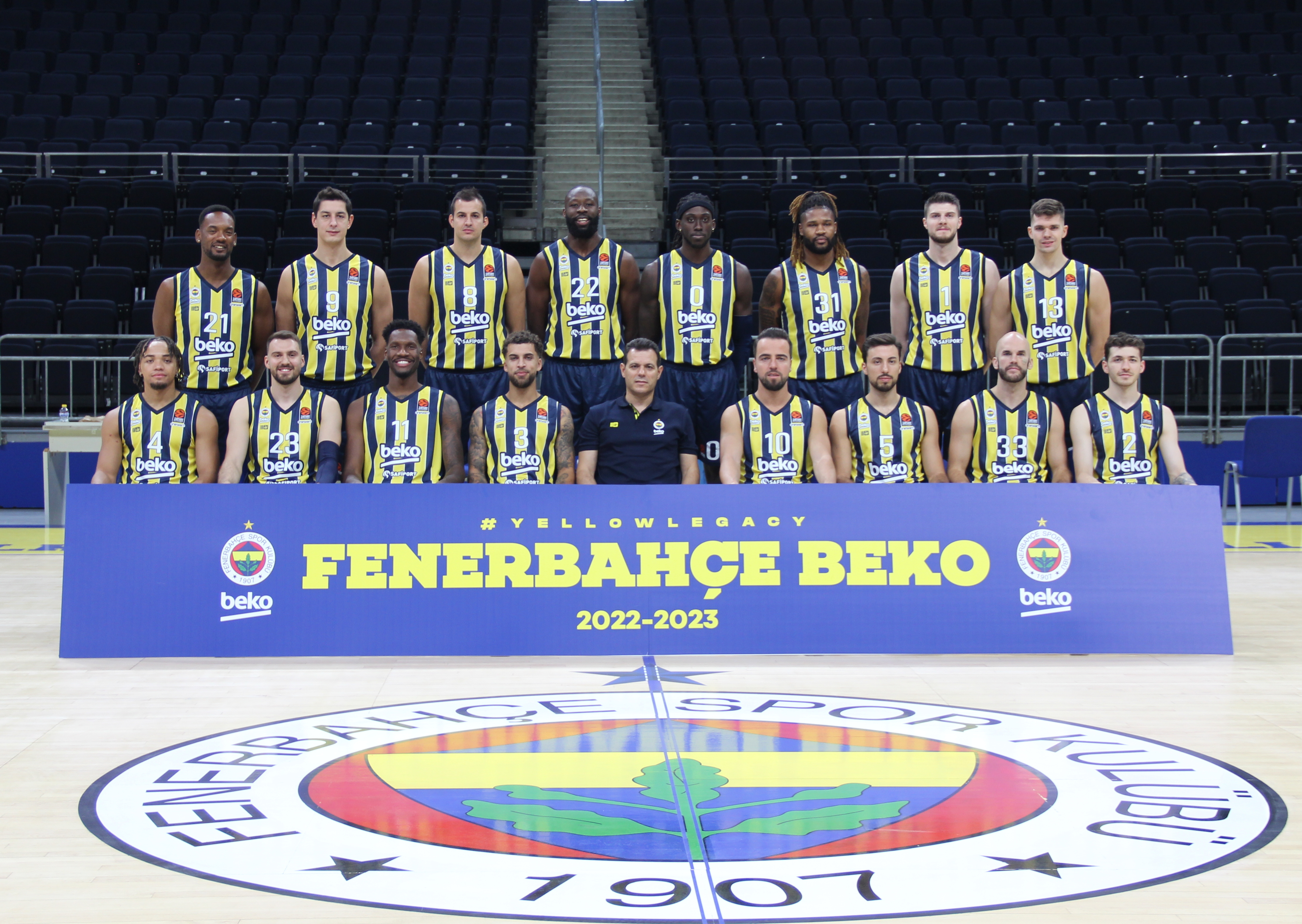
2022–23 squad

Note: Flags indicate national team eligibility at FIBA-sanctioned events. Players may hold other non-FIBA nationalities not displayed.

Fenerbahçe Beko roster
Players
Coaches

Pos.	No.	Nat.	Name	Ht.	Wt.	Age
F	0	(United States)	Motley, Johnathan	2.06 m (6 ft 9 in)	104 kg (229 lb)	28 – 4 May 1995
F	1	(Turkey) (Ireland)	Birsen, Metecan	2.08 m (6 ft 10 in)	101 kg (223 lb)	28 – 6 April 1995
G	2	(Turkey)	Hazer, Şehmus	1.91 m (6 ft 3 in)	90 kg (198 lb)	24 – 15 February 1999
PG	3	(United States) (Turkey)	Wilbekin, Scottie	1.88 m (6 ft 2 in)	80 kg (176 lb)	30 – 5 April 1993
G	4	(United States)	Edwards, Carsen	1.82 m (6 ft 0 in)	91 kg (201 lb)	25 – 12 March 1998
G	5	(Turkey) (Germany)	Akpınar, İsmet	1.92 m (6 ft 4 in)	77 kg (170 lb)	28 – 22 May 1995
PF	8	(Serbia)	Bjelica, Nemanja	2.07 m (6 ft 9 in)	106 kg (234 lb)	35 – 9 May 1988
SF	9	(Turkey)	Geyik, Samet	2.06 m (6 ft 9 in)	98 kg (216 lb)	30 – 12 January 1993
G	10	(Turkey)	Mahmutoğlu, Melih (C)	1.91 m (6 ft 3 in)	85 kg (187 lb)	33 – 12 May 1990
F	11	(United States)	Hayes, Nigel	2.03 m (6 ft 8 in)	103 kg (227 lb)	28 – 16 December 1994
F	13	(Bosnia and Herzegovina) (Turkey)	Biberović, Tarik	2.01 m (6 ft 7 in)	100 kg (220 lb)	22 – 28 January 2001
F	21	(Canada)	Pierre, Dyshawn	1.98 m (6 ft 6 in)	104 kg (229 lb)	29 – 17 November 1993
F/C	22	(Nigeria)	Jekiri, Tonye	2.12 m (6 ft 11 in)	103 kg (227 lb)	28 – 27 July 1994
SG	23	(Serbia)	Gudurić, Marko	1.98 m (6 ft 6 in)	91 kg (201 lb)	28 – 8 March 1995
G	27	(United States) (Greece)	Dorsey, Tyler	1.93 m (6 ft 4 in)	82 kg (181 lb)	26 – 18 December 1996
F/C	31	(United States)	Booker, Devin	2.06 m (6 ft 9 in)	113 kg (249 lb)	32 – 28 February 1991
G/F	33	(Greece) (United States)	Calathes, Nick	1.98 m (6 ft 6 in)	97 kg (214 lb)	34 – 7 February 1989
F	37	(Nigeria) (Greece)	Antetokounmpo, Kostas	2.08 m (6 ft 10 in)	91 kg (201 lb)	25 – 20 November 1997

Head coach

- (Greece) Dimitris Itoudis

Assistant coach(es)

- (Greece) Stefanos Dedas
- (Turkey) Erdem Bilmen
- (Slovenia) Rado Trifunović
- (Turkey) Serhan Aydanarığ
- (Turkey) Berkay Oğuz
- (Turkey) Alp Timuçin Yeter

Athletic trainer(s)

- (Turkey) İlker Belgutay

Physiotherapist(s)

- (Turkey) Rıza Özdemir
- (Turkey) Berkay Güzel
- (Greece) Kosmas Kontogiannis

Team manager

- (Greece) Kostas Chatzichristos
- (Turkey) Cenk Renda

Legend

- (C) Team captain
- (DC) Dual citizenship
- Injured

- Roster
Updated: 18 June 2023

=== Depth chart ===
Pos.	Starting 5	Bench 1	Bench 2	Bench 3	Inactive
C	Johnathan Motley	Tonye Jekiri	Kostas Antetokounmpo (injured)		Devin Booker (injured)
PF	Dyshawn Pierre	Metecan Birsen (injured)		Samet Geyik	Nemanja Bjelica (injured)
SF	Nigel Hayes-Davis	Marko Gudurić		Tarik Biberović
SG	Tyler Dorsey	Carsen Edwards (injured)	Melih Mahmutoğlu	Şehmus Hazer (injured)
PG	Nick Calathes	Scottie Wilbekin		İsmet Akpınar

=== Transactions ===
==== In ====
No.	Pos.	Nat.	Name	Age	Moving from		Ends	Date	Source
9	PF	(Turkey)	Samet Geyik	29	Türk Telekom	(Turkey)	June 2023	20 June 2022	
0	C	(United States)	Johnathan Motley	27	Lokomotiv Kuban	(Russia)	June 2024	20 June 2022	
3	G	(Turkey)	Scottie Wilbekin	29	Maccabi Tel Aviv	(Israel)	June 2025	26 June 2022	
22	C	(Nigeria)	Tonye Jekiri	27	UNICS Kazan	(Russia)	June 2023	26 June 2022	
11	F	(United States)	Nigel Hayes	27	FC Barcelona	(Spain)	June 2023	22 July 2022	
4	G	(United States)	Carsen Edwards	24	Detroit Pistons	(United States)	June 2023	31 July 2022	
8	PF	(Serbia)	Nemanja Bjelica	34	Golden State Warriors	(United States)	June 2024	9 August 2022	
33	PG	(Greece)	Nick Calathes	33	Barcelona	(Spain)	June 2024	23 August 2022	
37	C	(Greece)	Kostas Antetokounmpo	25	Chicago Bulls	(United States)	June 2023	19 December 2022	
27	SG	(Greece)	Tyler Dorsey	27	Texas Legends	(United States)	June 2025	1 March 2023	

==== Out ====
No.	Pos.	Nat.	Name	Age	Moving to		Date	Source
3	SG	(Canada)	Marial Shayok	25	Maine Celtics	(United States)	15 April 2022	
11	PG	(United States)	Markel Starks	31	Darüşşafaka	(Turkey)	19 June 2022	
22	PF	(Germany)	Danilo Barthel	30	Free agent		20 June 2022	
44	C	(Jordan)	Ahmet Düverioğlu	29	Bursaspor	(Turkey)	20 June 2022	
24	C	(Czech Republic)	Jan Veselý	32	FC Barcelona	(Spain)	21 June 2022	
25	C	(United States)	Jehyve Floyd	24	Galatasaray	(Turkey)	21 June 2022	
20	PG	(United States)	Pierriá Henry	29	Saski Baskonia	(Spain)	25 June 2022	
19	SG	(France)	Nando de Colo	34	ASVEL	(France)	30 June 2022	
33	PF	(Italy)	Achille Polonara	30	Anadolu Efes	(Turkey)	20 July 2022	

==== Out on loan ====
No.	Pos.	Nat.	Name	Age	Moving to	Date	Source

==== Contract extension ====
No	Pos.	Nat.	Name	Age	Cont.	Date	Source
33	SG	(Serbia)	Marko Gudurić	28	3	4 March 2023	
11	SF	(United States)	Nigel Hayes	28	2+1	7 April 2023	
1	PF	(Turkey)	Metecan Birsen	28	2+1	30 May 2023	
21	PF	(Canada)	Dyshawn Pierre	29	2+1	30 May 2023	

== Pre-season and friendlies ==
=== Friendly match ===
3 September 2022 Tübad Cup 1	Fenerbahçe Beko	95–77	Beşiktaş Emlakjet	Istanbul
	Scoring by quarter: 22-33, 18-18, 19-27, 18-17
	Pts: Edwards 30; Rebs: Jekiri, Motley 5 Asts: Wilbekin 6	Boxscore	Pts: Orelik 17; Rebs: McCormack 9 Asts: Coleman 6	Arena: Sinan Erdem Dome; Attendance: 0

5 September 2022 Tübad Cup 2	Fenerbahçe Beko	96–92	Anadolu Efes	Istanbul
	Scoring by quarter: 21-18, 28-20, 28-33, 19-21
	Pts: Motley 21; Rebs: Motley 6 Asts: Wilbekin 7	Boxscore	Pts: Dunston 18; Rebs: Pleiß 6 Asts: Beaubois 5	Arena: Sinan Erdem Dome; Attendance: 0

7 September 2022 Friendly Match	Fenerbahçe Beko	77–67	Bahçeşehir Koleji	Istanbul
	Scoring by quarter: 23-18, 18-18, 19-17, 17-14
	Pts: Edwards 14; Rebs: Birsen, Hayes 6 Asts: Wilbekin 6	Boxscore	Pts: Arslan 17; Rebs: Brodziansky 9 Asts: Özmızrak 4	Arena: Metro Enerji Sport Hall; Attendance: 0

10 September 2022 Friendly Match	Fenerbahçe Beko	66–74	Olympiacos	Istanbul
19:00	Scoring by quarter: 16-16, 14-18, 15-15, 21-25
	Pts: Booker 13	Boxscore	Pts: Bolomboy 14	Arena: Ülker Sports and Event Hall; Attendance: 0

12 September 2022 Istanball Cup	Fenerbahçe Beko	79–93	Olympiacos	Istanbul
20:30
	Pts: Wilbekin 18; Rebs: Birsen 9 Asts: Pierre, Wilbekin 4	Boxscore	Pts: Walkup 16; Rebs: Bolomboy 8 Asts: Walkup 9	Arena: Ülker Sports and Event Hall

15 September 2022 Cevat Soydaş Tournament 1	Fenerbahçe Beko	88–86	Gaziantep Basketbol	Bursa
	Scoring by quarter: 16–18, 19–21, 29–26, 24–21
	Pts: Edwards 23; Rebs: Pierre 7 Asts: Wilbekin 4	Boxscore	Pts: Frankamp 19; Rebs: Miller-McIntyre 4 Asts: Öğüt 8	Arena: Tofaş Sport Hall

16 September 2022 Cevat Soydaş Tournament 2	Fenerbahçe Beko	72–75	Galatasaray Nef	Bursa
19:30	Scoring by quarter: 6–17, 25–15, 23–16, 18–27
	Pts: Hayes 19; Rebs: Pierre 10; Asts: Edwards, Pierre 4	Boxscore	Pts: Morgan 24; Rebs: Angola 7 Asts: Ennis 5	Arena: Tofaş Sport Hall

22 September 2022 Pınar Cup 1	Pınar Karşıyaka	87–98	Fenerbahçe Beko	İzmir
	Scoring by quarter: 18–25, 20–17, 27–30, 22–26
	Pts: McCollum 23; Rebs: Durmaz, Delgado 6 Asts: Delgado, McCollum 4	Boxscore	Pts: Edwards 20; Rebs: Pierre 7 Asts: Calathes 9	Arena: Mustafa Kemal Atatürk Karşıyaka Sport Hall

23 September 2022 Pınar Cup 2	Fenerbahçe Beko	89–93	Prometey	İzmir
	Scoring by quarter: 21–29, 24–17, 14–25, 30–22
	Pts: Hazer 22	Boxscore	Pts: Kennedy 16	Arena: Mustafa Kemal Atatürk Karşıyaka Sport Hall

== Competitions ==
=== Overview ===
Competition	First match	Last match	Starting round	Final position	Record							
Competition	First match	Last match	Starting round	Final position	Pld	W	D	L	PF	PA	PD	Win %
Basketball Super League	2 October 2022	9 June 2023	Round 1	Semifinals	36	27	0	9	3,154	2,851	+303	75.00
EuroLeague	6 October 2022	9 May 2023	Round 1	Quarterfinals	39	21	0	18	3,229	3,159	+70	53.85
Turkish Basketball Cup	14 February 2023	Suspended	Quarterfinals	Suspended	0	0	0	0	0	0	+0	—
Presidential Cup	28 September 2022		Final	Runners-up	1	0	0	1	62	71	−9	0.00
Total					76	48	0	28	6,445	6,081	+364	63.16

Source: Competitions

=== Presidential Cup ===
==== Matches ====
28 September 2022	Anadolu Efes	71–62	Fenerbahçe Beko	Ankara
19:00 (TRT)	Scoring by quarter: 15–23, 8–19, 13–12, 26–17
TRT Spor	Pts: Žižić 22; Rebs: Clyburn 10; Asts: Micić 9 PIR: Žižić 25	Boxscore	Pts: Hayes 13; Rebs: Pierre 6 Asts: Calathes 6 PIR: Gudurić, Hayes 12	Arena: Ankara Arena; Referees: Erşan Kartal, Hüseyin Çelik, Can Mavisu

=== Basketball Super League ===
==== League table ====
Pos	Team	Pld	W	L	PF	PA	PD	Pts	Qualification or relegation
1	Türk Telekom	30	25	5	2627	2331	+296	55	Advance to playoffs
2	Fenerbahçe Beko	30	24	6	2596	2344	+252	54	Advance to playoffs
3	Anadolu Efes (C)	30	22	8	2653	2395	+258	52	Advance to playoffs
4	Pınar Karşıyaka	30	21	9	2676	2571	+105	51	Advance to playoffs
5	Frutti Extra Bursaspor	30	17	13	2507	2460	+47	47	Advance to playoffs

Source: Basketbol Süper Ligi
(C) Champions

==== Results summary ====
Overall						Home					Away				
Pld	W	L	PF	PA	PD	W	L	PF	PA	PD	W	L	PF	PA	PD
30	24	6	2596	2344	+252	13	1	1227	1094	+133	11	5	1369	1250	+119

Source: bsl.org.tr

==== Results by round ====
Round	1	2	3	4	5	6	7	8	9	10	11	12	13	14	15	16	17	18	19	20	21	22	23	24	25	26	27	28	29	30
Ground	H	A	H	A	H	A	H	A	A	H	A	H	A	H	A	A	H	A	H	A	H	A	A	H	H	A	H	H	A	H
Result	W	W	W	W	W	W	W	W	W	L	L	W	W	W	W	W	W	W	W	L	W	L	W	W	L	W	W	W	W	W
Position	6	4	3	1	1	1	1	1	1	1	2	1	1	1	1	1	1	1	1	2	2	2	2	2	2	2	2	2	2	2

Source: TBF.org.tr
A = Away; H = Home; W = Win; L = Loss

==== Matches ====
Note: All times are TRT (UTC+3) as listed by the Turkish Basketball Federation.

2 October 2022 1	Fenerbahçe Beko	78–72	Bahçeşehir Koleji	Istanbul
15:30	Scoring by quarter: 23–28, 9–13, 27–8, 19–23
	Pts: Hayes 21; Rebs: Hayes 6 Asts: Pierre, Wilbekin 6 PIR: Hayes 24	Boxscore	Pts: Smith 18; Rebs: Boutsiele 12; Asts: Özmızrak 4 PIR: Boutsiele 22	Arena: Ülker Sports Arena; Referees: Zafer Yılmaz, Mehmet Şahin, Sinem Tetik

10 October 2022 2	ONVO Büyükçekmece	80–85	Fenerbahçe Beko	Istanbul
19:00	Scoring by quarter: 17–25, 21–17, 21–22, 21–21
	Pts: Rivers 18; Rebs: Sajus 8 Asts: Crawford 6 PIR: Rivers 23	Boxscore	Pts: Wilbekin 18; Rebs: Motley 6 Asts: Gudurić 8 PIR: three players 19	Arena: Gazanfer Bilge Sports Hall; Referees: Özlem Yalman, Polat Parlak, İsmail Binbir

16 October 2022 3	Fenerbahçe Beko	85–71	AYOS Konyaspor	Istanbul
18:00	Scoring by quarter: 18–15, 22–12, 21–17, 24–27
	Pts: Edwards 20; Rebs: Hayes 8 Asts: Gudurić 5 PIR: Birsen 16	Boxscore	Pts: Eddie 18; Rebs: Morgan 9 Asts: Sulaimon 7 PIR: Eddie 20	Arena: Ülker Sports Arena; Referees: Yener Yılmaz, Fatih Güler, Berk Kurtulmuş

22 October 2022 4	Manisa Büyükşehir Belediyespor	58–93	Fenerbahçe Beko	Manisa
20:30	Scoring by quarter: 13–18, 13–29, 20–22, 12–24
	Pts: Anosike 17; Rebs: Anosike 10; Asts: Anosike 4 PIR: Anosike 24	Boxscore	Pts: Mahmutoğlu 18; Rebs: Birsen, Jekiri 10; Asts: Wilbekin 8 PIR: Jekiri 25	Arena: Muradiye Spor Salonu; Referees: Kerem Baki, Orhan Çağrı Hekimoğlu, Umut Özgün Ergün

31 October 2022 5	Fenerbahçe Beko	100–88	Pınar Karşıyaka	Istanbul
19:00	Scoring by quarter: 18–26, 31–23, 34–17, 17–22
	Pts: Wilbekin 27; Rebs: Motley 11; Asts: Calathes 10; PIR: Wilbekin 29	Boxscore	Pts: Delgado 18; Rebs: Delgado 11; Asts: Sipahi 10; PIR: Delgado 24	Arena: Ülker Sports Arena; Referees: Erşan Kartal, Altuğ Köselerli, Tolga Edis

29 November 2022 6	Beşiktaş Emlakjet	72–81	Fenerbahçe Beko	Istanbul
20:00	Scoring by quarter: 20–31, 20–22, 17–12, 15–16
	Pts: Yıldızlı 17; Rebs: McCormack 9 Asts: Coleman 5 PIR: Yıldızlı 22	Boxscore	Pts: Akpınar 23; Rebs: Motley 7 Asts: Akpınar 5 PIR: Akpınar 23	Arena: Akatlar Arena; Referees: Aytuğ Ekti, Mehmet Serdar Ünal, Batuhan Söylemezoğlu

20 November 2022 7	Fenerbahçe Beko	82–68	Tofaş	Istanbul
18:00	Scoring by quarter: 26–18, 17–15, 21–15, 18–20
	Pts: Motley 20; Rebs: Geyik 8 Asts: Calathes 6 PIR: Motley 20	Boxscore	Pts: Gray 16; Rebs: Tanışan 6 Asts: Ennis, Uğurlu 4 PIR: Tanışan 15	Arena: Ülker Sports Arena; Referees: Fatih Arslanoğlu, Can Mavisu, Hüseyin Çelik

27 November 2022 8	Galatasaray Nef	91–97	Fenerbahçe Beko	Istanbul
20:30	Scoring by quarter: 23–31, 28–15, 19–26, 21–25
	Pts: Ennis 27; Rebs: Caloiaro 6 Asts: Bost 7 PIR: Bost 28	Boxscore	Pts: Wilbekin 22; Rebs: Birsen 8 Asts: Calathes 11; PIR: Hayes 25	Arena: Sinan Erdem Dome; Referees: Ali Serkan Emlek, Mehmet Karabilecen, Burak Yılmaz

4 December 2022 9	Gaziantep Basketbol	68–76	Fenerbahçe Beko	Gaziantep
18:00	Scoring by quarter: 16–20, 26–15, 14–19, 12–22
	Pts: Miller-McIntyre 29; Rebs: Dotson, Hammonds 7 Asts: Miller-McIntyre 5 PIR: Miller-McIntyre 23	Boxscore	Pts: Motley 19; Rebs: Motley 8 Asts: Edwards 5 PIR: Motley 27	Arena: Karataş Şahinbey Sport Hall; Referees: Mehmet Şahin, Semih Vural, Çağlar Özkan

11 December 2022 10	Fenerbahçe Beko	75–82	Türk Telekom	Istanbul
15:30	Scoring by quarter: 17–19, 18–25, 18–22, 22–16
	Pts: Motley 16; Rebs: Motley 6 Asts: Gudurić 4 PIR: Motley 16	Boxscore	Pts: Grant, Taylor 20; Rebs: Yılmaz 11; Asts: Grant 7 PIR: Grant 26	Arena: Ülker Sports Arena; Referees: Emin Moğulkoç, Ali Şakacı, Musa Kazım Çetin

18 December 2022 11	Yukatel Merkezefendi Belediyesi	80–77	Fenerbahçe Beko	Denizli
18:00	Scoring by quarter: 24–16, 19–9, 19–23, 18–29
	Pts: Rogkavopoulos 25; Rebs: Hamilton, Rogkavopoulos 9 Asts: Tülüoğlu 4 PIR: Rogkavopoulos 32	Boxscore	Pts: Gudurić 35; Rebs: Jekiri 10; Asts: Gudurić 3 PIR: Gudurić 36	Arena: Pamukkale University Arena; Referees: Zafer Yılmaz, Ziya Özorhon, Mehmet Serdar Ünal

26 December 2022 12	Fenerbahçe Beko	93–90(OT)	Anadolu Efes	Istanbul
19:00	Scoring by quarter: 24–23, 26–17, 21–14, 8–25, Overtime: 14–11
	Pts: Motley, Pierre 23; Rebs: Pierre 9 Asts: Calathes, Wilbekin 5 PIR: Pierre 30	Boxscore	Pts: Clyburn 39; Rebs: Clyburn 13; Asts: Larkin 6 PIR: Clyburn 41	Arena: Ülker Sports Arena; Referees: Aytuğ Ekti, Özlem Yalman, Ahmet Tatlıcı

2 January 2023 13	Petkim Spor	71–76	Fenerbahçe Beko	Aliağa, İzmir
18:00	Scoring by quarter: 19–21, 18–16, 16–19, 18–20
	Pts: Simmons 19; Rebs: Aldridge 10; Asts: Ulusoy 9 PIR: Aldridge, Simmons 21	Boxscore	Pts: Gudurić 19; Rebs: Pierre 10; Asts: Wilbekin 6 PIR: Gudurić 20	Arena: Enka Sport Hall; Referees: Kaan Büyükçil, Serhat Büker, Murat Ciner

7 January 2023 14	Fenerbahçe Beko	95–82	Darüşşafaka Basketbol	Istanbul
18:00	Scoring by quarter: 31–11, 19–22, 23–15, 22–34
	Pts: Mahmutoğlu 15; Rebs: Birsen 7 Asts: Calathes 8 PIR: Calathes 18	Boxscore	Pts: Korkmaz 21; Rebs: White 5 Asts: Starks 5 PIR: Korkmaz 18	Arena: Ülker Sports Arena; Referees: Yener Yılmaz, Fatih Arslanoğlu, Yiğit Gönültaş

15 January 2023 15	Frutti Extra Bursaspor	84–100	Fenerbahçe Beko	Bursa
15:30	Scoring by quarter: 20–22, 23–26, 17–22, 24–20
	Pts: Bitim 17; Rebs: Auguste, Dudzinski 5 Asts: Clemmons, Needham 5 PIR: Auguste, Dudzinski 18	Boxscore	Pts: Hayes, Wilbekin 17; Rebs: Motley 7 Asts: Calathes 10; PIR: Wilbekin 19	Arena: Tofaş Spor Salonu; Referees: Zafer Yılmaz, Can Mavisu, Ayşe Nur Yazıcıoğlu

22 January 2023 16	Bahçeşehir Koleji	87–93	Fenerbahçe Beko	Istanbul
13:00	Scoring by quarter: 24–27, 21–16, 23–26, 19–24
	Pts: three player 17; Rebs: Boutsiele 7 Asts: Hall 7 PIR: Candan 18	Boxscore	Pts: Edwards 31; Rebs: Birsen 10; Asts: Calathes, Wilbekin 4 PIR: Edwards, Pierre 28	Arena: Ülker Sports Arena; Referees: Hüseyin Çelik, Alper Özgök, Batuhan Söylemezoğlu

28 January 2023 17	Fenerbahçe Beko	82–69	ONVO Büyükçekmece	Istanbul
20:30	Scoring by quarter: 25–20, 23–23, 15–12, 19–14
	Pts: Mahmutoğlu 17; Rebs: Birsen 8 Asts: Edwards, Wilbekin 6 PIR: Edwards 18	Boxscore	Pts: Crawford 19; Rebs: Weber 12; Asts: Crawford, Harris 5 PIR: Weber 22	Arena: Ülker Sports Arena; Referees: Kerem Baki, Ziya Özorhon, Erhan Gürsel

5 February 2023 18	AYOS Konyaspor	61–62	Fenerbahçe Beko	Konya
15:30	Scoring by quarter: 13–13, 9–19, 21–19, 18–11
	Pts: Pérez 12; Rebs: Schilling 10; Asts: Pérez 6 PIR: Schilling 14	Boxscore	Pts: Pierre 15; Rebs: Hayes 8 Asts: Wilbekin 5 PIR: Pierre 14	Arena: Selçuklu Belediyesi Uluslararası Spor Salonu; Referees: Mehmet Karabilecen, Serhat Büker, Umut Özgün Ergün

5 March 2023 19	Fenerbahçe Beko	92–78	Manisa Büyükşehir Belediyespor	Istanbul
18:00	Scoring by quarter: 26–19, 25–24, 18–17, 23–18
	Pts: Edwards 16; Rebs: Motley 8 Asts: Wilbekin 6 PIR: Pierre 16	Boxscore	Pts: Cruz 18; Rebs: Anosike 11; Asts: Tarrant 6 PIR: Anosike 20	Arena: Ülker Sports Arena; Referees: Ali Şakacı, Sinem Tetik, Çağlar Özkan
Note: The game, originally scheduled for 12 February 2023, was postponed due to the 2023 Turkey–Syria earthquake. Rescheduled to 5 March 2023.

13 March 2023 20	Pınar Karşıyaka	102–98	Fenerbahçe Beko	İzmir
19:00	Scoring by quarter: 22–21, 24–27, 27–21, 29–29
	Pts: Kuzminskas 23; Rebs: Delgado 12; Asts: three players 5 PIR: Angola, Kuzminskas 22	Boxscore	Pts: Motley, Wilbekin 17; Rebs: Motley 8 Asts: Calathes 6 PIR: Motley 23	Arena: Karşıyaka Arena; Referees: Emin Moğulkoç, Ahmet Tatlıcı, Batuhan Söylemezoğlu

18 March 2023 21	Fenerbahçe Beko	95–80	Beşiktaş Emlakjet	Istanbul
20:30	Scoring by quarter: 25–17, 21–21, 26–26, 23–16
	Pts: Hayes 30; Rebs: Hayes, Jekiri 9 Asts: Hazer 5 PIR: Hayes 36	Boxscore	Pts: Usher 22; Rebs: Usher 7 Asts: Jackson-Cartwright, Sokołowski 4 PIR: Usher 26	Arena: Ülker Sports Arena; Referees: Yener Yılmaz, Fatih Arslanoğlu, Ali Köseoğlu

26 March 2023 22	Tofaş	94–89	Fenerbahçe Beko	Bursa
18:00	Scoring by quarter: 23–24, 24–15, 18–18, 29–32
	Pts: Gray 26; Rebs: three players 6 Asts: Gray 8 PIR: Gray 37	Boxscore	Pts: Motley 32; Rebs: Motley 10; Asts: Gudurić 7 PIR: Motley 35	Arena: Tofaş Spor Salonu; Referees: Özlem Yalman, Semih Vural, Umut Özgün Ergün

3 April 2023 23	Fenerbahçe Beko	86–64	Galatasaray Nef	Istanbul
20:30	Scoring by quarter: 24–13, 23–12, 16–20, 23–19
	Pts: Pierre 15; Rebs: Hayes 9 Asts: Calathes 8 PIR: Pierre 22	Boxscore	Pts: Kabaca 13; Rebs: Ristić 9 Asts: Russell 4 PIR: Ristić 18	Arena: Ülker Sports Arena; Referees: Zafer Yılmaz, Mehmet Şahin, Murat Ciner

9 April 2023 24	Fenerbahçe Beko	100–50	Gaziantep Basketbol	Istanbul
15:30	Scoring by quarter: 33–12, 20–12, 23–12, 24–14
	Pts: Hazer 21; Rebs: Biberovic 9 Asts: Akpınar 5 PIR: Hazer 27	Boxscore	Pts: Egbunu 13; Rebs: Egbunu 7 Asts: Miller-McIntyre, Frankamp 3 PIR: Egbunu 9	Arena: Ülker Sports Arena; Referees: Ali Serkan Emlek, Ahmet Tatlıcı, Özge Şentürk Bayraktar

16 April 2023 25	Türk Telekom	83–72	Fenerbahçe Beko	Ankara
18:00	Scoring by quarter: 27–19, 18–21, 20–17, 18–15
	Pts: Grant 18; Rebs: Jones 12; Asts: Taylor 5 PIR: Jones 26	Boxscore	Pts: Motley 25; Rebs: Motley 7 Asts: Calathes 5 PIR: Motley 30	Arena: Ankara Arena; Referees: Aytuğ Ekti, Can Mavisu, Çağlar Özkan

21 April 2023 26	Fenerbahçe Beko	79–72	Yukatel Merkezefendi Belediyesi	Istanbul
19:00	Scoring by quarter: 18–18, 13–20, 19–20, 29–14
	Pts: Hayes 24; Rebs: Motley 9 Asts: Hayes 5 PIR: Hayes 31	Boxscore	Pts: Rathan-Mayes 21; Rebs: Hamilton 7 Asts: Tülüoğlu 8 PIR: Rathan-Mayes, Hamilton 15	Arena: Ülker Sports Arena; Referees: Kaan Büyükçil, Polat Parlak, Erhan Gürsel

16 May 2023 27	Anadolu Efes	96–91	Fenerbahçe Beko	Istanbul
19:00	Scoring by quarter: 28–28, 19–21, 28–23, 21–19
	Pts: Larkin 23; Rebs: Žižić 10; Asts: Bryant 5 PIR: Larkin, Žižić 25	Boxscore	Pts: Dorsey, Motley 18; Rebs: Motley 7 Asts: Calathes 7 PIR: Calathes, Motley 19	Arena: Sinan Erdem Dome; Referees: Emin Moğulkoç, Ali Serkan Emlek, Ahmet Tatlıcı

18 May 2023 28	Fenerbahçe Beko	101–96	Petkim Spor	Istanbul
19:00	Scoring by quarter: 32–23, 29–26, 17–21, 23–26
	Pts: Motley 24; Rebs: Edwards 7 Asts: three players 5 PIR: Motley 30	Boxscore	Pts: Chery 27; Rebs: Aldridge 9 Asts: Perkins 5 PIR: Chery 26	Arena: Ülker Sports Arena; Referees: Zafer Yılmaz, Ayşe Nur Yazıcıoğlu, Sinem Tetik

13 May 2023 29	Darüşşafaka Basketbol	73–79	Fenerbahçe Beko	Istanbul
20:30	Scoring by quarter: 18–22, 17–21, 22–16, 16–20
	Pts: Özdemiroğlu 20; Rebs: Osmani 9 Asts: Starks 5 PIR: Osmani 23	Boxscore	Pts: Hayes 16; Rebs: Jekiri 6 Asts: Wilbekin 4 PIR: Hayes 18	Arena: Ayhan Şahenk Spor Salonu; Referees: Mehmet Karabilecen, Musa Kazım Çetin, Tolga Edis

22 May 2023 30	Fenerbahçe Beko	84–82	Frutti Extra Bursaspor	Istanbul
19:00	Scoring by quarter: 22–21, 23–21, 19–20, 20–20
	Pts: Wilbekin 18; Rebs: Antetokounmpo 9 Asts: Pierre, Wilbekin 4 PIR: Wilbekin 22	Boxscore	Pts: Bitim 16; Rebs: Auguste 11; Asts: Needham, Auguste 4 PIR: Auguste 24	Arena: Ülker Sports Arena; Referees: Yener Yılmaz, Ali Şakacı, Burak Yılmaz

==== Playoffs ====
===== Quarterfinals =====
Win Loss

27 May 2023 1	Fenerbahçe Beko	93–78 (Series: 1–0)	Tofaş	Istanbul
20:30	Scoring by quarter: 28–20, 19–15, 20–20, 26–23
	Pts: Hazer, Motley 17; Rebs: Motley 8 Asts: Calathes, Pierre 7 PIR: Hazer 21	Boxscore	Pts: Toure 23; Rebs: Toure 9 Asts: Doyle, Gray 5 PIR: Toure 29	Arena: Ülker Sports and Event Hall; Referees: Aytuğ Ekti, Mehmet Şahin, Berk Kurtulmuş

31 May 2023 2	Tofaş	87–98 (Series: 0–2)	Fenerbahçe Beko	Bursa
20:30	Scoring by quarter: 13–26, 25–23, 22–21, 27–28
	Pts: Toure 24; Rebs: Toure 9 Asts: Ennis, Doyle 5 PIR: Toure 31	Boxscore	Pts: Hayes 25; Rebs: Pierre, Calathes 5 Asts: Pierre 5 PIR: Hayes 30	Arena: Tofaş Nilüfer Sports Hall; Referees: Zafer Yılmaz, Hüseyin Çelik, Seher Ayşe Nur Yazıcıoğlu

===== Semifinals =====
Win Loss

3 June 2023 1	Fenerbahçe Beko	108–66 (Series: 1–0)	Anadolu Efes	Istanbul
18:00	Scoring by quarter: 23–17, 28–20, 26–17, 31–12
	Pts: Motley 18; Rebs: Geyik, Gudurić 8 Asts: three players 5 PIR: Geyik 21	Boxscore	Pts: Bryant 13; Rebs: Bryant 10; Asts: Larkin; PIR: Bryant 18	Arena: Ülker Sports and Event Hall; Referees: Kerem Baki, Mehmet Şahin, Ahmet Tatlıcı

5 June 2023 2	Fenerbahçe Beko	90–92 (Series: 1–1)	Anadolu Efes	Istanbul
20:00	Scoring by quarter: 25–16, 20–24, 16–25, 29–27
	Pts: Motley 22; Rebs: Motley 9 Asts: Motley 6 PIR: Motley 26	Boxscore	Pts: Clyburn 35; Rebs: Clyburn, M'Baye 10; Asts: Larkin 6 PIR: Clyburn 35	Arena: Ülker Sports and Event Hall; Referees: Emin Moğulkoç, Ziya Özorhon, Tolga Edis

7 June 2023 3	Anadolu Efes	97–91 (Series: 2–1)	Fenerbahçe Beko	Istanbul
20:00	Scoring by quarter: 22–24, 30–27, 19–27, 26–13
	Pts: Micić 25; Rebs: Pleiß 9 Asts: Larkin 8 PIR: Micić 26	Boxscore	Pts: Wilbekin 23; Rebs: Pierre 6 Asts: Calathes, Gudurić 6 PIR: Hayes, Pierre 19	Arena: Sinan Erdem Dome; Referees: Aytuğ Ekti, Zafer Yılmaz, Mehmet Serdar Ünal

9 June 2023 4	Anadolu Efes	87–78 (Series: 3–1)	Fenerbahçe Beko	Istanbul
20:00	Scoring by quarter: 16–20, 29–21, 20–20, 22–17
	Pts: Micić 27; Rebs: Clyburn 10; Asts: Micić 6 PIR: Micić 28	Boxscore	Pts: Wilbekin 18; Rebs: Motley 9 Asts: Gudurić 8 PIR: Motley 24	Arena: Sinan Erdem Dome; Referees: Ali Serkan Emlek, Can Mavisu, Ali Şakacı

=== EuroLeague ===
==== League table ====
Pos	Team	Pld	W	L	PF	PA	PD	Qualification
6	(Basketball Federation of Serbia) Partizan Mozzart Bet	34	20	14	2877	2781	+96	Qualification to playoffs
7	(Lithuanian Basketball Federation) Žalgiris	34	19	15	2591	2626	−35	Qualification to playoffs
8	(Turkish Basketball Federation) Fenerbahçe Beko	34	19	15	2823	2745	+78	Qualification to playoffs
9	(Spanish Basketball Federation) Cazoo Baskonia	34	18	16	2919	2836	+83	
10	(Basketball Federation of Serbia) Crvena zvezda Meridianbet	34	17	17	2591	2613	−22	

Source: EuroLeague
Rules for classification: All points scored in extra period(s) were not counted in the standings, nor for any tie-break situation.

==== Results summary ====
Overall						Home					Away				
Pld	W	L	PF	PA	PD	W	L	PF	PA	PD	W	L	PF	PA	PD
34	19	15	2863	2777	+86	12	5	1463	1337	+126	7	10	1400	1440	−40

Source: EuroLeague

==== Results by round ====
Round	1	2	3	4	5	6	7	8	9	10	11	12	13	14	15	16	17	18	19	20	21	22	23	24	25	26	27	28	29	30	31	32	33	34
Ground	A	H	H	H	A	A	H	H	A	A	H	A	A	H	H	A	A	A	H	H	A	H	H	H	A	H	A	H	A	H	A	A	H	A
Result	W	W	W	W	W	L	W	W	W	W	L	W	L	L	L	L	L	W	W	W	L	L	W	L	W	W	L	W	L	W	L	L	W	L
Position	4	1	1	1	1	1	1	1	1	1	1	1	1	1	1	5	6	5	3	3	3	5	4	5	4	4	5	5	5	5	5	6	5	8

Source: EuroLeague.net
A = Away; H = Home; W = Win; L = Loss

==== Matches ====
Note: All times, from 30 October 2022 to 26 March 2023, are CET (UTC+1); up to 30 October 2022 and from 26 March 2023, are CEST (UTC+2) as listed by EuroLeague.

6 October 2022 1	Bayern Munich (Germany)	62–74	(Turkey) Fenerbahçe Beko	Munich
20:30	Scoring by quarter: 19–21, 15–19, 12–19, 16–15
	Pts: Hunter 18; Rebs: Hunter 8 Asts: Weiler-Babb 5 PIR: Hunter 27	Boxscore	Pts: Jekiri 15; Rebs: Motley 7 Asts: Gudurić, Calathes 5 PIR: Jekiri 22	Arena: Audi Dome; Attendance: 6,500; Referees: Juan Carlos García, Tomislav Hordov, Uroš Nikolić

14 October 2022 2	Fenerbahçe Beko (Turkey)	86–71	(Israel) Maccabi Tel Aviv	Istanbul
20:00	Scoring by quarter: 23–20, 23–12, 19–20, 21–19
	Pts: Gudurić 23; Rebs: Calathes 9 Asts: Calathes 9 PIR: Calathes 26	Boxscore	Pts: Baldwin 14; Rebs: Nebo 7 Asts: Brown 6 PIR: Nebo 16	Arena: Ülker Sports and Event Hall; Attendance: 11,257; Referees: Daniel Hierrezuelo, Mehdi Difallah, Piotr Pastusiak

18 October 2022 3	Fenerbahçe Beko (Turkey)	84–63	(France) LDLC ASVEL	Istanbul
19:45	Scoring by quarter: 25–19, 17–17, 23–10, 19–17
	Pts: Edwards 19; Rebs: Hayes 6 Asts: Calathes 8 PIR: Calathes 18	Boxscore	Pts: Fall 17; Rebs: Fall 9 Asts: de Colo, Mathews 4 PIR: Fall 24	Arena: Ülker Sports and Event Hall; Attendance: 8,622; Referees: Miguel Ángel Pérez, Luka Kardum, Kristaps Konstantinovs

20 October 2022 4	Fenerbahçe Beko (Turkey)	79–77	(Spain) Valencia Basket	Istanbul
19:45	Scoring by quarter: 20–25, 14–18, 26–15, 19–19
	Pts: Wilbekin 20; Rebs: Pierre 9 Asts: Calathes 7 PIR: Motley 23	Boxscore	Pts: Jones 16; Rebs: Jones 7 Asts: Jones 3 PIR: Jones 20	Arena: Ülker Sports and Event Hall; Attendance: 8,970; Referees: Robert Lottermoser, Saulius Račys, Milan Nedović

28 October 2022 5	Anadolu Efes (Turkey)	79–88	(Turkey) Fenerbahçe Beko	Istanbul
19:30	Scoring by quarter: 27–26, 17–23, 18–22, 17–17
	Pts: Micić 19; Rebs: three players 6 Asts: Micić 5 PIR: M'Baye 19	Boxscore	Pts: Wilbekin 25; Rebs: Calathes 7 Asts: Calathes 4 PIR: Gudurić 23	Arena: Sinan Erdem Dome; Attendance: 14,890; Referees: Saša Pukl, Emilio Pérez, Fernando Rocha

4 November 2022 6	Barcelona (Spain)	81–80	(Turkey) Fenerbahçe Beko	Barcelona
20:30	Scoring by quarter: 21–19, 18–17, 23–13, 19–31
	Pts: Laprovíttola 26; Rebs: Tobey 7 Asts: Laprovíttola 7 PIR: Laprovíttola 28	Boxscore	Pts: Motley 23; Rebs: Motley 7 Asts: Wilbekin 4 PIR: Motley 26	Arena: Palau Blaugrana; Attendance: 6,815; Referees: Matej Boltauzer, Tomislav Hordov, Uroš Nikolić

11 November 2022 7	Fenerbahçe Beko (Turkey)	93–79	(Serbia) Crvena zvezda mts	Istanbul
18:45	Scoring by quarter: 24–23, 18–18, 24–16, 27–22
	Pts: Motley 25; Rebs: Motley 10; Asts: Calathes 6 PIR: Motley 33	Boxscore	Pts: Nedović 17; Rebs: Kuzmić 6 Asts: Nedović 4 PIR: Nedović 20	Arena: Ülker Sports and Event Hall; Attendance: 9,351; Referees: Miguel Ángel Pérez, Leandro Lezcano, Hugues Thépénier

18 November 2022 8	Fenerbahçe Beko (Turkey)	107–77	(Greece) Panathinaikos OPAP	Istanbul
18:45	Scoring by quarter: 22–25, 33–15, 23–15, 29–22
	Pts: Wilbekin 19; Rebs: Edwards 6 Asts: Calathes 7 PIR: Hayes 21	Boxscore	Pts: Bacon 20; Rebs: Bacon 5 Asts: Wolters 5 PIR: Bacon 19	Arena: Ülker Sports and Event Hall; Attendance: 12,441; Referees: Sreten Radović, Mehdi Difallah, Carlos Cortés

22 November 2022 9	AS Monaco Basket (France)	93–96	(Turkey) Fenerbahçe Beko	Fontvieille, Monaco
19:00	Scoring by quarter: 18–21, 20–24, 22–34, 33–17
	Pts: Loyd 18; Rebs: Hall 8 Asts: James, Okobo 5 PIR: Loyd 24	Boxscore	Pts: Hayes 21; Rebs: Jekiri 6 Asts: Calathes, Wilbekin 7 PIR: Calathes 25	Arena: Salle Gaston Médecin; Attendance: 4,321; Referees: Daniel Hierrezuelo, Fernando Rocha, Mario Majkić

24 November 2022 10	EA7 Emporio Armani Milan (Italy)	72–82	(Turkey) Fenerbahçe Beko	Milan
20:30	Scoring by quarter: 21–15, 16–17, 11–26, 24–24
	Pts: Mitrou-Long 18; Rebs: Melli 6 Asts: Mitrou-Long 4 PIR: Hall 13	Boxscore	Pts: Hayes 22; Rebs: Gudurić 6 Asts: Gudurić, Calathes 6 PIR: Hayes 31	Arena: Mediolanum Forum; Attendance: 9,266; Referees: Robert Lottermoser, Gytis Vilius, Uroš Nikolić

2 December 2022 11	Fenerbahçe Beko (Turkey)	71–85	(Spain) Real Madrid	Istanbul
18:45	Scoring by quarter: 16–25, 18–21, 20–22, 17–17
	Pts: Motley 20; Rebs: Motley 7 Asts: Calathes 6 PIR: Booker 17	Boxscore	Pts: Musa 18; Rebs: Deck 8 Asts: Musa 6 PIR: Tavares 26	Arena: Ülker Sports and Event Hall; Attendance: 12,476; Referees: Saša Pukl, Ilija Belošević, Luka Kardum

8 December 2022 12	ALBA Berlin (Germany)	75–104	(Turkey) Fenerbahçe Beko	Berlin
20:00	Scoring by quarter: 18–24, 17–30, 17–30, 23–20
	Pts: Smith 15; Rebs: Zoosman 5 Asts: Blatt, Zoosman 4 PIR: Thiemann 18	Boxscore	Pts: Edwards, Gudurić 13; Rebs: Jekiri 10; Asts: Edwards 8 PIR: Gudurić 20	Arena: Mercedes-Benz Arena; Attendance: 13,166; Referees: Mehdi Difallah, Carlos Peruga, Sašo Petek

13 December 2022 13	Olympiacos (Greece)	94–67	(Turkey) Fenerbahçe Beko	Piraeus
19:00	Scoring by quarter: 31–11, 27–20, 16–20, 20–16
	Pts: Vezenkov 21; Rebs: three players 4 Asts: Sloukas 7 PIR: Vezenkov 27	Boxscore	Pts: Edwards 13; Rebs: Booker 7 Asts: Gudurić 4 PIR: Gudurić 13	Arena: Peace and Friendship Stadium; Attendance: 9,892; Referees: Juan Carlos García, Oļegs Latiševs, Damir Javor

16 December 2022 14	Fenerbahçe Beko (Turkey)	70–76	(Spain) Cazoo Baskonia	Istanbul
18:45	Scoring by quarter: 13–21, 20–31, 23–15, 14–9
	Pts: Gudurić 14; Rebs: Calathes 13; Asts: Jekiri 5 PIR: Jekiri 22	Boxscore	Pts: Howard 15; Rebs: Costello 9 Asts: Thompson 9 PIR: Sedekerskis 17	Arena: Ülker Sports and Event Hall; Attendance: 9,174; Referees: Borys Ryzhyk, Gytis Vilius, Milan Nedovic

22 December 2022 15	Fenerbahçe Beko (Turkey)	72–73	(Serbia) Partizan NIS Belgrade	Istanbul
18:45	Scoring by quarter: 19–16, 18–17, 20–18, 15–22
	Pts: Wilbekin 14; Rebs: Hayes, Calathes 7 Asts: Calathes 7 PIR: Hayes 22	Boxscore	Pts: Punter, Lessort 12; Rebs: LeDay, Papapetrou 6 Asts: five players 2 PIR: Punter 17	Arena: Ülker Sports and Event Hall; Attendance: 9,735; Referees: Sreten Radovic, Carmelo Paternico, Emilio Perez

30 December 2022 16	Virtus Segafredo Bologna (Italy)	92–88	(Turkey) Fenerbahçe Beko	Bologna
20:30	Scoring by quarter: 23–25, 23–21, 19–22, 27–20
	Pts: Belinelli 18; Rebs: Jaiteh 7 Asts: Pajola 10; PIR: Belinelli 23	Boxscore	Pts: Motley 26; Rebs: Booker, Motley 8 Asts: Calathes, Gudurić 4 PIR: Motley 30	Arena: Segafredo Arena; Attendance: 7,619; Referees: Benjamin Jimenez, Fernando Rocha, Elias Koromilas

5 January 2023 17	Žalgiris (Lithuania)	86–66	(Turkey) Fenerbahçe Beko	Kaunas
19:00	Scoring by quarter: 21–15, 20–15, 26–10, 19–26
	Pts: Brazdeikis, Dimša 17; Rebs: Šmits, Birutis 6 Asts: Brazdeikis, Birutis 3 PIR: Birutis 27	Boxscore	Pts: Booker 10; Rebs: Birsen 7 Asts: Gudurić 4 PIR: Wilbekin 9	Arena: Žalgiris Arena; Attendance: 15,131; Referees: Mehdi Difallah, Carlos Peruga, Mario Majkić

10 January 2023 18	Panathinaikos OPAP (Greece)	88–94(OT)	(Turkey) Fenerbahçe Beko	Marousi, Athens
20:30	Scoring by quarter: 19–18, 20–18, 20–15, 19–27, Overtime: 10–16
	Pts: Bacon 27; Rebs: Ponitka 12; Asts: Wolters 4 PIR: Ponitka 26	Boxscore	Pts: Hayes 24; Rebs: Motley 8 Asts: Calathes, Gudurić 5 PIR: Hayes 30	Arena: O.A.K.A. Attendance: 4,180; Referees: Robert Lottermoser, Juan Carlos García, Uroš Nikolić

12 January 2023 19	Fenerbahçe Beko (Turkey)	79–71	(Germany) Bayern Munich	Istanbul
18:45	Scoring by quarter: 19–18, 27–21, 21–10, 12–22
	Pts: Motley 22; Rebs: Motley 17; Asts: Gudurić, Wilbekin 4 PIR: Motley 38	Boxscore	Pts: Rubit 21; Rebs: Gillespie 8 Asts: Walden 7 PIR: Rubit 26	Arena: Ülker Sports and Event Hall; Attendance: 8,754; Referees: Daniel Hierrezuelo, Artūras Šukys, Luka Kardum

19 January 2023 20	Fenerbahçe Beko (Turkey)	98–94(OT)	(France) AS Monaco Basket	Istanbul
18:45	Scoring by quarter: 20–20, 19–27, 21–13, 24–24, Overtime: 14–10
	Pts: Wilbekin 21; Rebs: Motley 9 Asts: Calathes 8 PIR: Motley 25	Boxscore	Pts: James 23; Rebs: Diallo 8 Asts: James 6 PIR: Diallo 26	Arena: Ülker Sports and Event Hall; Attendance: 9,052; Referees: Damir Javor, Anne Panther, Emilio Pérez

26 January 2023 21	LDLC ASVEL (France)	91–77	(Turkey) Fenerbahçe Beko	Villeurbanne, Lyon
20:00	Scoring by quarter: 25–12, 23–21, 23–22, 20–22
	Pts: de Colo 26; Rebs: Tyus 6 Asts: Bost 9 PIR: de Colo 30	Boxscore	Pts: Edwards 22; Rebs: Hayes, Gudurić 5 Asts: Edwards, Gudurić 3 PIR: Edwards 19	Arena: Astroballe; Attendance: 5,560; Referees: Miguel Ángel Pérez, Gytis Vilius, Piotr Pastusiak

31 January 2023 22	Fenerbahçe Beko (Turkey)	73–93	(Greece) Olympiacos	Istanbul
18:45	Scoring by quarter: 10–24, 20–27, 21–26, 22–16
	Pts: Gudurić 24; Rebs: Antetokounmpo 7 Asts: Calathes, Gudurić 4 PIR: Gudurić 21	Boxscore	Pts: Papanikolaou 21; Rebs: Vezenkov 12; Asts: Walkup 7 PIR: Papanikolaou 22	Arena: Ülker Sports and Event Hall; Attendance: 11,709; Referees: Robert Lottermoser, Joseph Bissang, Carlos Cortés

3 February 2023 23	Fenerbahçe Beko (Turkey)	101–86	(Germany) ALBA Berlin	Istanbul
18:45	Scoring by quarter: 31–27, 26–20, 24–14, 20–25
	Pts: Hayes 24; Rebs: Hayes 11; Asts: Pierre 4 PIR: Hayes 37	Boxscore	Pts: Wetzell 13; Rebs: Koumadje 9 Asts: Blatt 8 PIR: three players 13	Arena: Ülker Sports and Event Hall; Attendance: 8,758; Referees: Sreten Radović, Carlos Peruga, Uroš Obrknežević

21 March 2023 24	Fenerbahçe Beko (Turkey)	75–82	(Italy) EA7 Emporio Armani Milan	Istanbul
18:15	Scoring by quarter: 18–23, 17–14, 17–24, 23–21
	Pts: Motley 22; Rebs: Motley 9 Asts: Calathes, Gudurić 3 PIR: Motley 31	Boxscore	Pts: Napier 26; Rebs: Voigtmann 8 Asts: Baron 4 PIR: Napier 26	Arena: Ülker Sports and Event Hall; Referees: Daniel Hierrezuelo, Oļegs Latiševs, Rain Peerandi
Note: The game, originally scheduled for 10 February 2023, was postponed due to the 2023 Turkey–Syria earthquake. Rescheduled to 21 March 2023.

23 February 2023 25	Partizan NIS Belgrade (Serbia)	94–97	(Turkey) Fenerbahçe Beko	Belgrade
20:30	Scoring by quarter: 22–22, 24–25, 23–21, 25–29
	Pts: Punter 25; Rebs: Lessort 11; Asts: Madar 4 PIR: Lessort 30	Boxscore	Pts: Gudurić 25; Rebs: Pierre 6 Asts: Gudurić 7 PIR: Gudurić 35	Arena: Štark Arena; Attendance: 19,661; Referees: Miguel Ángel Pérez, Borys Ryzhyk, Gytis Vilius

3 March 2023 26	Fenerbahçe Beko (Turkey)	104–72	(Italy) Virtus Segafredo Bologna	Istanbul
18:45	Scoring by quarter: 31–14, 27–15, 27–23, 19–20
	Pts: Pierre 20; Rebs: Birsen 9 Asts: Calathes 8 PIR: Pierre 22	Boxscore	Pts: Belinelli 18; Rebs: Ojeleye 6 Asts: Shengelia, Teodosić 5 PIR: Belinelli 20	Arena: Ülker Sports and Event Hall; Attendance: 9,236; Referees: Ilija Belošević, Sašo Petek, Rain Peerandi

8 March 2023 27	Maccabi Tel Aviv (Israel)	78–74	(Turkey) Fenerbahçe Beko	Tel Aviv
18:30	Scoring by quarter: 17–25, 26–14, 18–17, 17–18
	Pts: Brown 21; Rebs: Colson 7 Asts: Brown, DiBartolomeo 3 PIR: DiBartolomeo 21	Boxscore	Pts: Hayes 16; Rebs: Pierre 8 Asts: Calathes 4 PIR: Pierre 18	Arena: Menora Mivtachim Arena; Attendance: 10,128; Referees: Milivoje Jovčić, Jordi Aliaga, Luka Kardum

10 March 2023 28	Fenerbahçe Beko (Turkey)	81–73	(Spain) Barcelona	Istanbul
18:45	Scoring by quarter: 18–30, 19–10, 24–16, 20–17
	Pts: Motley 16; Rebs: four players 4 Asts: Calathes, Wilbekin 4 PIR: Hayes, Motley 17	Boxscore	Pts: Mirotić 19; Rebs: Veselý 9 Asts: Satoranský 4 PIR: Mirotić 17	Arena: Ülker Sports and Event Hall; Attendance: 12,106; Referees: Saša Pukl, Fernando Rocha, Uroš Nikolić

16 March 2023 29	Valencia Basket (Spain)	82–80	(Turkey) Fenerbahçe Beko	Valencia
20:30	Scoring by quarter: 22–21, 21–21, 18–18, 21–20
	Pts: Dubljević 18; Rebs: Webb, Dubljević 7 Asts: Jones 4 PIR: Dubljević 21	Boxscore	Pts: Gudurić 23; Rebs: Hayes 6 Asts: Gudurić 5 PIR: Gudurić 23	Arena: Font de Sant Lluís; Attendance: 5,509; Referees: Robert Lottermoser, Tomislav Hordov, Adar Peer

24 March 2023 30	Fenerbahçe Beko (Turkey)	87–79	(Lithuania) Žalgiris	Istanbul
18:45	Scoring by quarter: 22–16, 24–19, 19–20, 22–24
	Pts: N. Hayes 19; Rebs: N. Hayes 6 Asts: Calathes 6 PIR: N. Hayes 26	Boxscore	Pts: Šmits 18; Rebs: K. Hayes 9 Asts: Taylor 9 PIR: K. Hayes 21	Arena: Ülker Sports and Event Hall; Attendance: 7,732; Referees: Ilija Belošević, Emilio Pérez, Ioannis Foufis

29 March 2023 31	Real Madrid (Spain)	90–75	(Turkey) Fenerbahçe Beko	Madrid
20:45	Scoring by quarter: 24–21, 25–23, 19–14, 22–17
	Pts: Musa 16; Rebs: Deck 8 Asts: Hanga 7 PIR: Musa 25	Boxscore	Pts: Hayes 17; Rebs: Calathes, Jekiri 6 Asts: Calathes 6 PIR: Hayes 21	Arena: WiZink Center; Attendance: 9,523; Referees: Sreten Radović, Gytis Vilius, Milan Nedović

31 March 2023 32	Cazoo Baskonia (Spain)	92–69	(Turkey) Fenerbahçe Beko	Vitoria-Gasteiz
20:30	Scoring by quarter: 25–27, 13–17, 22–14, 32–11
	Pts: Marinković 35; Rebs: Costello 12; Asts: Thompson, Costello 4 PIR: Marinković 29	Boxscore	Pts: Motley 18; Rebs: Bjelica 5 Asts: four players 2 PIR: Motley 16	Arena: Buesa Arena; Attendance: 11,324; Referees: Matej Boltauzer, Milivoje Jovčić, Amit Balak

6 April 2023 33	Fenerbahçe Beko (Turkey)	103–86	(Turkey) Anadolu Efes	Istanbul
19:45	Scoring by quarter: 23–17, 25–23, 24–24, 31–22
	Pts: Hayes 26; Rebs: Pierre 8 Asts: three players 4 PIR: Hayes 32	Boxscore	Pts: Clyburn 21; Rebs: Žižić 7 Asts: Larkin 6 PIR: Clyburn 24	Arena: Ülker Sports and Event Hall; Attendance: 11,709; Referees: Juan Carlos García, Damir Javor, Tomislav Hordov

13 April 2023 34	Crvena zvezda mts (Serbia)	91–89(OT)	(Turkey) Fenerbahçe Beko	Belgrade
19:00	Scoring by quarter: 15–21, 26–18, 16–18, 22–22, Overtime: 12–10
	Pts: Campazzo 24; Rebs: Petrušev 6 Asts: Mitrović 4 PIR: Vildoza 21	Boxscore	Pts: Motley 27; Rebs: Motley, Hayes 8 Asts: Calathes 12; PIR: Hayes 25	Arena: Aleksandar Nikolić Hall; Attendance: 7,259; Referees: Robert Lottermoser, Carmelo Paternicò, Jordi Aliaga

=== EuroLeague Playoffs ===
==== Quarterfinals ====
Win Loss

26 April 2023 1	Olympiacos (Greece)	79–68	(Turkey) Fenerbahçe Beko	Piraeus
20:45	Scoring by quarter: 19–21, 18–14, 26–16, 16–17
	Pts: Vezenkov 19; Rebs: Vezenkov 6 Asts: Papanikolaou, Walkup 4 PIR: Fall 20	Boxscore	Pts: Motley 15; Rebs: Motley 7 Asts: Gudurić 6 PIR: Gudurić 20	Arena: Peace and Friendship Stadium; Attendance: 11,677; Referees: Miguel Ángel Pérez, Mehdi Difallah, Tomislav Hordov

28 April 2023 2	Olympiacos (Greece)	78–82	(Turkey) Fenerbahçe Beko	Piraeus
20:30	Scoring by quarter: 24–10, 13–24, 19–17, 22–31
	Pts: Sloukas, Vezenkov 18; Rebs: Fall 9 Asts: Walkup 6 PIR: Vezenkov 27	Boxscore	Pts: Edwards 16; Rebs: Pierre 7 Asts: Hayes 5 PIR: Hayes 21	Arena: Peace and Friendship Stadium; Attendance: 11,677; Referees: Robert Lottermoser, Damir Javor, Gytis Vilius

3 May 2023 3	Fenerbahçe Beko (Turkey)	71–72	(Greece) Olympiacos	Istanbul
19:45	Scoring by quarter: 21–15, 14–23, 16–7, 20–27
	Pts: Dorsey 21; Rebs: Jekiri 7 Asts: Calathes 6 PIR: Jekiri 26	Boxscore	Pts: Sloukas 25; Rebs: Walkup 8 Asts: Sloukas 6 PIR: Sloukas 34	Arena: Ülker Sports and Event Hall; Attendance: 12,678; Referees: Matej Boltauzer, Ilija Belošević, Emilio Pérez

5 May 2023 4	Fenerbahçe Beko (Turkey)	73–69	(Greece) Olympiacos	Istanbul
19:45	Scoring by quarter: 18–17, 14–16, 16–16, 25–20
	Pts: Pierre 17; Rebs: Jekiri 5 Asts: Calathes, Motley 4 PIR: Dorsey 16	Boxscore	Pts: McKissic 20; Rebs: Fall 7 Asts: three players 3 PIR: McKissic 23	Arena: Ülker Sports and Event Hall; Attendance: 12,437; Referees: Miguel Ángel Pérez, Saša Pukl, Mehdi Difallah

9 May 2023 5	Olympiacos (Greece)	84–72	(Turkey) Fenerbahçe Beko	Piraeus
20:30	Scoring by quarter: 20–15, 24–18, 21–19, 19–20
	Pts: Sloukas 22; Rebs: Papanikolaou 11; Asts: Sloukas 6 PIR: Sloukas 27	Boxscore	Pts: Gudurić 26; Rebs: Hayes 5 Asts: five players 2 PIR: Gudurić 17	Arena: Peace and Friendship Stadium; Attendance: 11,677; Referees: Juan Carlos García, Tomislav Hordov, Milan Nedović

=== Turkish Basketball Cup ===
==== Quarterfinals ====
Win Loss

14 February 2023 QF	Frutti Extra Bursaspor	Suspended	Fenerbahçe Beko	Bursa
20:30
TRT Spor Yıldız		Boxscore		Arena: Tofaş Spor Salonu
Note: The game, originally scheduled for 14 February 2023, was suspended due to the 2023 Turkey–Syria earthquakes.

== Statistics ==
Legend
GP	Games played	GS	Games started	MPG	Minutes per game
FG%	Field-goal percentage	3FG%	3-point field-goal percentage	FT%	Free-throw percentage
RPG	Rebounds per game	APG	Assists per game	SPG	Steals per game
BPG	Blocks per game	PPG	Points per game	PIR	PIR per game

Player	Left during season

=== Basketbol Süper Ligi ===
Player	GP	GS	MPG	2FG%	3FG%	FT%	RPG	APG	SPG	BPG	PPG	PIR
İsmet Akpınar	22		11:17	.444	.388	.790	0.6	1.7	0.1	0.1	5.0	4.5
Kostas Antetokounmpo	3		17:37	.750	.000	.417	5.0	0.3	0.3	1.0	7.7	9.3
Tarik Biberovic	24		14:33	.465	.348	.882	2.5	0.5	0.4	0.1	5.3	5.0
Metecan Birsen	22		22:10	.510	.397	.548	4.9	1.1	1.0	0.1	6.5	9.4
Nemanja Bjelica	1		12:30	.000	.000	.000	2.0	1.0	0	0	0	-2.0
Devin Booker	12		20:52	.575	.316	.667	4.8	1.5	0.7	0.6	5.8	9.7
Nick Calathes	20		22:29	.514	.329	.667	3.9	5.8	1.0	0	7.7	12.0
Tyler Dorsey	4		19:50	.546	.357	.667	2.3	0.8	0.5	0	7.8	6.8
Carsen Edwards	20		21:30	.509	.333	.889	2.0	2.0	0.9	0	13.3	9.9
Samet Geyik	31		10:37	.661	.389	.611	2.4	0.5	0.4	0.2	3.4	5.4
Marko Gudurić	21		21:51	.745	.377	.897	2.1	3.7	1.1	0.1	10.8	12.5
Nigel Hayes	32		28:09	.570	.458	.779	4.8	2.0	1.3	0.3	12.2	15.1
Şehmus Hazer	29		15:18	.500	.300	.653	2.2	1.9	0.7	0	7.0	6.1
Tonye Jekiri	10		18:23	.610	.000	.667	5.5	1.0	0.5	0.2	5.6	10.0
Melih Mahmutoğlu	36		14:26	.468	.418	1.000	0.9	0.5	0.2	0	6.6	4.9
Johnathan Motley	33		23:26	.636	.200	.704	5.8	1.6	0.4	0.6	15.4	16.9
Dyshawn Pierre	24		25:14	.544	.382	.788	4.9	2.4	0.8	0.3	8.4	11.8
Scottie Wilbekin	27		23:59	.472	.473	.831	1.8	4.4	0.9	0	11.2	12.8
TOTAL	—			.566	.387	.749	32.3	20.2	6.8	1.7	87.6	99.5

Source: Basketbol Süper Ligi

=== EuroLeague ===
Player	GP	GS	MPG	2FG%	3FG%	FT%	RPG	APG	SPG	BPG	PPG	PIR
İsmet Akpınar	5	1	6:21	1.000	.667	.000	0.4	0.4	0.2	0	3.2	1.4
Kostas Antetokounmpo	14	4	6:32	.824	.000	.588	0.8	0.4	0.2	0.1	2.7	2.3
Tarik Biberovic	12	2	10:11	.375	.350	.500	0.9	0.2	0.5	0	2.9	1.2
Metecan Birsen	28	3	7:41	.370	.323	.667	1.5	0.3	0.1	0	2.0	1.5
Nemanja Bjelica	7	0	8:29	.500	.167	.400	2.1	0.9	0.3	0.1	2.7	3.1
Devin Booker	31	12	21:06	.538	.321	.762	3.3	1.1	0.4	0.6	5.8	6.6
Nick Calathes	39	39	25:39	.503	.336	.382	4.0	4.9	1.1	0	8.0	10.0
Tyler Dorsey	13	8	21:26	.467	.327	.774	1.5	1.5	0.4	0	9.0	6.1
Carsen Edwards	34	2	15:21	.446	.342	.864	1.3	1.1	0.6	0.1	8.0	4.9
Samet Geyik	1	0	11:11	1.000	.000	.000	1.0	1.0	1.0	1.0	2.0	3.0
Marko Gudurić	38	5	23:51	.573	.402	.833	3.0	3.2	0.9	0	12.3	12.8
Nigel Hayes	39	39	30:27	.568	.405	.750	4.4	1.5	1.2	0.3	10.5	13.4
Şehmus Hazer	17	0	5:47	.682	.600	.571	0.8	0.5	0.4	0	2.5	2.5
Tonye Jekiri	30	10	13:29	.670	.000	.733	3.2	1.0	0.5	0.2	4.9	6.8
Melih Mahmutoğlu	19	0	10:26	.615	.403	1.000	0.7	0.4	0.1	0	5.4	3.6
Johnathan Motley	36	25	23:16	.624	.231	.684	5.4	1.6	0.6	0.4	14.5	16.0
Dyshawn Pierre	29	22	22:47	.479	.486	.586	3.8	1.6	0.3	0.2	7.2	9.3
Scottie Wilbekin	25	23	23:40	.506	.357	.733	1.7	2.6	1.0	0	11.1	10.1
TOTAL	—			.554	.373	.723	33.5	18.0	6.5	1.6	82.8	90.1

Source: EuroLeague
