= 2022–23 Basketbol Süper Ligi =

Basketball league in Turkey

Basketbol Süper Ligi
- Season: 2022–23
- Dates: 30 September 2022 – 17 June 2023
- Games played: 260
- Teams: 16
- TV partner: beIN Sports

Regular season
- Season MVP: (United States) Tyrique Jones
- Relegated: Konya Basketbol; Gaziantep Basketbol

Finals
- Champions: Anadolu Efes (16th title)
- Runners-up: Pınar Karşıyaka
- Semifinalists: Fenerbahçe Beko; Türk Telekom
- Finals MVP: (Serbia) Vasilije Micić

Statistical leaders
Points	(United States) Jordon Crawford	19.6
Rebounds	(United States) O. D. Anosike	10.8
Assists	(Mexico) Alex Pérez	7.5
Index Rating	(United States) Tyrique Jones	21.4

Records
- Biggest home win: Fenerbahçe Beko 108–66 Anadolu Efes (3 June 2023)
- Biggest away win: Manisa Büyükşehir 58–93 Fenerbahçe Beko (22 October 2022)
- Highest scoring: Anadolu Efes 111–112 Pınar Karşıyaka (4 December 2022)
- Winning streak: 12 games Türk Telekom
- Losing streak: 9 games AYOS Konyaspor

The 2022–23 Basketbol Süper Ligi was the 57th season of the Basketball Super League (Turkish: Basketbol Süper Ligi), the top-level professional club men's basketball league in Turkey.

== Teams ==
On 2 May 2022, Manisa BB was promoted to the BSL as the champion of the Turkish Basketball First League. It will be their first season in the BSL. Beysu Konyaspor promoted to the BSL as winners of the TBL play-offs.

Semt77 Yalovaspor and HDI Sigorta Afyon Belediye were relegated after finishing in the last two spots for 2021–22 Basketbol Süper Ligi.

=== Venues ===
Locations of the 2022–23 Basketbol Süper Ligi clubs
Istanbul Basketbol Süper Ligi clubs

Team	Home city	Stadium	Capacity
Anadolu Efes	Istanbul	Sinan Erdem Dome	16,000
AYOS Konyaspor	Konya	Selçuklu Belediyesi Spor Salonu	4,200
Bahçeşehir Koleji	Istanbul	Ülker Sports Arena	13,800
Beşiktaş Emlakjet	Istanbul	Akatlar Arena	3,200
Darüşşafaka Lassa	Istanbul	Volkswagen Arena Istanbul	5,000
Fenerbahçe Beko	Istanbul	Ülker Sports Arena	13,800
Frutti Extra Bursaspor	Bursa	Tofaş Nilüfer Sports Hall	7,500
Galatasaray Nef	Istanbul	Sinan Erdem Dome	16,000
Gaziantep Basketbol	Gaziantep	Karataş Şahinbey Sport Hall	6,400
Manisa BB	Manisa	Muradiye Spor Salonu	3,500
ONVO Büyükçekmece	Istanbul	Gazanfer Bilge Spor Salonu	3,000
Petkim Spor	İzmir	Aliağa Belediyesi ENKA Spor Salonu	3,000
Pınar Karşıyaka	İzmir	Karşıyaka Arena	5,000
Tofaş	Bursa	Tofaş Nilüfer Sports Hall	7,500
Türk Telekom	Ankara	Ankara Arena	10,400
Yukatel Merkezefendi Basket	Denizli	Pamukkale University Arena	3,490

=== Personnel and sponsorship ===
Team	Head coach	Captain	Kit manufacturer	Main shirt sponsor
Anadolu Efes	(Turkey) Ergin Ataman	(Turkey) Doğuş Balbay	Bilcee	Corendon Airlines
AYOS Konyaspor	(Turkey) Sinan Çambel	(Turkey) Cevher Özer	New Balance	Atiker
Bahçeşehir Koleji	(Turkey) Sinan Atalay	(Turkey) Oğuz Savaş	Playoff	Bahçeşehir Koleji
Beşiktaş Emlakjet	(Turkey) Ahmet Kandemir	(Turkey) Burak Can Yıldızlı	KRTLYVS (Club manufactured kit)	Emlakjet
Darüşşafaka Lassa	(Turkey) Selçuk Ernak	(Turkey) Doğuş Özdemiroğlu	New Balance	Lassa
Fenerbahçe Beko	(Greece) Dimitrios Itoudis	(Turkey) Melih Mahmutoğlu	Fenerium (Club manufactured kit)	Beko
Frutti Extra Bursaspor	(Serbia) Dušan Alimpijević	(Montenegro) Derek Needham	Kappa	Uludağ Frutti Extra
Galatasaray Nef	(Greece) Andreas Pistiolis	(Turkey) Göksenin Köksal	Umbro	Nef
Gaziantep Basketbol	(Turkey) Tutku Açık	(Turkey) Birkan Batuk	Dafron	N/A
Manisa BB	(Turkey) Hakan Demir	(Turkey) Mustafa Görür	S by Sportive	Vestel
ONVO Büyükçekmece	(Turkey) Özhan Çıvgın	(Turkey) Yiğit Can Vardal	Dafron	Onvo
Petkim Spor	(Turkey) Burak Gören	(Turkey) Nusret Yıldırım	Playoff	Petkim
Pınar Karşıyaka	(Turkey) Ufuk Sarıca	(Turkey) Kenan Sipahi	Joxly	Pınar
Tofaş	(Greece) Dimitrios Priftis	(Turkey) Berk Uğurlu	S by Sportive	Fiat
Türk Telekom	(Turkey) Erdem Can	(United States) Tony Taylor	S by Sportive	Türk Telekom
Yukatel Merkezefendi Basket	(Turkey) Zafer Aktaş	(Turkey) Altan Erol	Geges	Yukatel

=== Head coaching changes ===
Team	Outgoing manager	Manner of departure	Date of vacancy	Position in table	Replaced with	Date of appointment
Türk Telekom	(Germany) Henrik Rödl	Mutual consent	9 May 2022	Pre-season	(Turkey) Erdem Can	10 June 2022
Tofaş	(Turkey) Ahmet Çakı	Mutual consent	7 June 2022	Pre-season	(Greece) Dimitrios Priftis	16 June 2022
Fenerbahçe Beko	(Serbia) Aleksandar Đorđević	Mutual consent	17 June 2022	Pre-season	(Greece) Dimitris Itoudis	19 June 2022
Manisa BB	(Turkey) Ceyhun Cabadak	Mutual consent	29 November 2022	15th (1–7)	(Turkey) Hakan Demir	30 November 2022
AYOS Konyaspor	(Turkey) Engin Gençoğlu	Mutual consent	26 December 2022	12th (4–8)	(Turkey) Sinan Çambel	3 January 2023
Beşiktaş Emlakjet	(Turkey) Ahmet Kandemir	Mutual consent	30 December 2022	15th (3–9)	(Croatia) (Poland) Igor Miličić	30 December 2022
Tofaş	(Greece) Dimitrios Priftis	Mutual consent	25 January 2023	10th (6–10)	(Turkey) Orhun Ene	25 January 2023
Bahçeşehir Koleji	(Turkey) Erhan Ernak	Mutual consent	14 March 2023	11th (8–12)	(Turkey) Sinan Atalay	15 March 2023
AYOS Konyaspor	(Turkey) Sinan Çambel	Mutual consent	21 March 2023	16th (6–15)	(Turkey) Can Sevim	21 March 2023
Galatasaray Nef	(Greece) Andreas Pistiolis	Mutual consent	9 May 2023	12th (12–15)	(Montenegro) Zvezdan Mitrović	11 May 2023

== Regular season ==
=== League table ===
Pos	Team	Pld	W	L	PF	PA	PD	Pts	Qualification or relegation
1	Türk Telekom	30	25	5	2627	2331	+296	55	Advance to playoffs
2	Fenerbahçe Beko	30	24	6	2596	2344	+252	54	Advance to playoffs
3	Anadolu Efes (C)	30	22	8	2653	2395	+258	52	Advance to playoffs
4	Pınar Karşıyaka	30	21	9	2676	2571	+105	51	Advance to playoffs
5	Frutti Extra Bursaspor	30	17	13	2507	2460	+47	47	Advance to playoffs
6	Darüşşafaka Lassa	30	15	15	2487	2547	−60	45	Advance to playoffs
7	Tofaş	30	15	15	2487	2454	+33	45	Advance to playoffs
8	Galatasaray Nef	30	14	16	2422	2441	−19	44	Advance to playoffs
9	Bahçeşehir Koleji	30	13	17	2324	2384	−60	43	
10	ONVO Büyükçekmece	30	13	17	2394	2482	−88	43	
11	Manisa BB	30	12	18	2345	2491	−146	42	
12	Petkim Spor	30	12	18	2375	2538	−163	42	
13	Yukatel Merkezefendi Basket	30	11	19	2385	2545	−160	41	
14	Beşiktaş Emlakjet	30	10	20	2457	2477	−20	40	
15	Gaziantep Basketbol (R)	30	9	21	2297	2420	−123	39	Relegation to TBL
16	AYOS Konyaspor (R)	30	7	23	2375	2527	−152	37	Relegation to TBL

Source: Basketbol Süper Ligi
(C) Champions; (R) Relegated

=== Positions by round ===
Team ╲ Round	1	2	3	4	5	6	7	8	9	10	11	12	13	14	15	16	17	18	19	20	21	22	23	24	25	26	27	28	29	30
Türk Telekom	7	11	7	5	5	3	2	2	2	2	1	2	2	2	2	2	2	2	2	1	1	1	1	1	1	1	1	1	1	1
Fenerbahçe Beko	6	4	3	1	1	1	1	1	1	1	2	1	1	1	1	1	1	1	1	2	2	2	2	2	2	2	2	2	2	2
Anadolu Efes	4	3	2	4	3	5	3	3	3	3	3	4	3	5	4	5	4	4	4	4	4	4	4	4	4	4	4	4	3	3
Pınar Karşıyaka	8	5	4	7	8	6	12	10	9	8	6	3	5	4	3	3	3	3	3	3	3	3	3	3	3	3	3	3	4	4
Frutti Extra Bursaspor	2	1	1	2	4	2	6	4	4	5	4	5	4	3	5	4	5	5	5	5	5	5	5	5	5	5	5	5	5	5
Darüşşafaka Lassa	9	7	9	12	10	13	11	9	7	7	8	8	7	9	7	6	6	6	6	6	6	6	6	6	6	6	6	6	6	6
Tofaş	1	6	5	3	2	4	4	5	6	6	7	7	8	10	10	10	10	9	12	13	14	13	11	13	8	11	9	7	7	7
Galatasaray Nef	14	12	8	10	12	10	7	8	5	4	5	6	6	6	8	9	9	11	10	9	8	9	9	7	7	7	12	8	8	8
Bahçeşehir Koleji	11	10	13	9	11	9	10	12	12	12	12	10	10	8	6	7	8	8	8	11	10	11	10	11	9	9	8	10	10	9
ONVO Büyükçekmece	16	16	16	16	16	15	15	15	15	13	13	14	14	14	13	11	15	13	13	10	9	8	8	10	12	8	7	9	9	10
Manisa BB	10	8	11	14	15	16	16	16	16	16	16	16	16	16	15	15	13	10	9	8	12	10	12	9	10	13	13	11	11	11
Petkim Spor	3	9	12	8	6	8	5	7	10	10	9	9	12	13	14	13	14	12	14	14	11	12	13	12	11	10	10	12	12	12
Yukatel Merkezefendi Basket	13	14	15	15	14	12	9	11	11	11	10	11	9	7	9	8	7	7	7	7	7	7	7	8	13	12	11	13	13	13
Beşiktaş Emlakjet	12	13	14	13	13	14	13	14	14	15	15	15	15	15	16	16	16	16	16	15	15	14	14	14	14	15	15	14	14	14
Gaziantep Basketbol	15	15	10	11	9	11	14	13	13	14	14	13	13	12	12	14	12	15	11	12	13	15	15	15	15	14	14	15	15	15
AYOS Konyaspor	5	2	6	6	7	7	8	6	8	9	11	12	11	11	11	12	11	14	15	16	16	16	16	16	16	16	16	16	16	16

Leader
Advance to the playoffs
Relegated

Source: Basketbol Süper Ligi

=== Results ===
Home \ Away	AEF	KON	BAH	BJK	DSK	FEN	BUR	GAL	GAZ	MBB	BÇB	PET	KSK	TOF	TTA	MEB
Anadolu Efes	—	88–83	97–68	104–88	88–78	96–91	82–63	77–68	77–73	78–69	97–98	90–64	111–112	84–76	102–87	96–77
AYOS Konyaspor	83–99	—	72–77	60–77	83–73	61–62	87–99	76–73	78–76	87–91	75–85	89–84	71–82	80–66	75–84	91–92
Bahçeşehir Koleji	62–73	90–77	—	86–83	79–84	87–93	69–74	79–86	78–73	89–85	92–77	71–61	78–73	89–84	72–77	79–78
Beşiktaş Emlakjet	86–99	82–90	67–71	—	98–84	72–81	93–87	85–78	107–74	73–76	107–69	84–85	81–92	105–85	75–91	70–59
Darüşşafaka Lassa	80–83	72–70	76–69	100–93	—	73–79	98–92	68–66	78–74	95–84	92–81	75–94	71–87	88–82	79–97	93–80
Fenerbahçe Beko	93–90	85–71	78–72	95–80	95–82	—		86–64	100–50	92–78	82–69	101–96	100–88	82–68	75–82	79–72
Frutti Extra Bursaspor	88–86	74–63	81–87	88–74	97–71	84–100	—	88–93	85–82	96–85	91–103	92–85	106–99	77–92	79–63	95–73
Galatasaray Nef	70–80	100–88	94–90	67–74	71–65	91–97	91–80	—	77–54	84–79	82–92	74–82	70–72	90–76	106–100	83–100
Gaziantep Basketbol	82–106	85–81	69–60	76–82	95–99	68–76	50–69	96–78	—	87–73	79–61	86–55	77–84	77–83	77–76	80–78
Manisa BB	74–95	79–80	81–89	73–66	73–92	58–93	82–87	85–72	69–65	—	87–74	86–78	80–76	82–76	50–77	90–75
ONVO Büyükçekmece	83–76	92–77	69–67	82–69	70–83	80–85	85–87	63–67	71–68	69–78	—	89–73	85–72	94–81	92–100	89–81
Petkim Spor	79–89	96–85	77–69	97–83	85–88	71–76	80–72	66–84	80–79	84–90	79–75	—	90–85	85–95	70–89	94–87
Pınar Karşıyaka	98–83	95–89	86–82	94–90	101–76	102–98	81–80	103–91	96–91	79–76	104–102	96–75	—	72–83	77–85	92–76
Tofaş	66–63	79–76	92–79	80–72	94–93	94–89	82–83	81–83	78–88	90–69	92–53	78–65	81–86	—	91–94	90–79
Türk Telekom	85–70	99–93	87–68	79–67	90–87	83–72	84–63	106–91	90–75	98–84	82–66	115–66	92–83	89–77	—	82–71
Yukatel Merkezefendi Basket	71–94	91–84	80–76	75–74	97–94	80–77	56–68	53–78	95–91	95–79	77–76	70–79	101–109	88–95	78–68	—

Source: Basketbol Süper Ligi
Legend: Blue = home team win; Red = away team win.
Matches with lighter background shading were decided after overtime.

== Playoffs ==
Quarterfinals was played best-of-three format (1–1–1), semifinals and finals was played in a best-of-five format (2–2–1).

=== Bracket ===
Quarterfinals
1	Türk Telekom	2
8	Galatasaray Nef	1
4	Pınar Karşıyaka	2
5	Frutti Extra Bursaspor	0
2	Fenerbahçe Beko	2
7	Tofaş	0
3	Anadolu Efes	2
6	Darüşşafaka Lassa	0

Semifinals
1	Türk Telekom	1
4	Pınar Karşıyaka	3
2	Fenerbahçe Beko	1
3	Anadolu Efes	3

Finals
3	Anadolu Efes	3
4	Pınar Karşıyaka	0

=== Quarterfinals ===
Team 1	Series	Team 2	Game 1	Game 2	Game 3
Türk Telekom	2–1	Galatasaray Nef	94–85	71–86	91–77
Fenerbahçe Beko	2–0	Tofaş	93–78	98–87	—
Anadolu Efes	2–0	Darüşşafaka Lassa	104–94	86–84	—
Pınar Karşıyaka	2–0	Frutti Extra Bursaspor	91–83	92–76	—

=== Semifinals ===
Team 1	Series	Team 2	Game 1	Game 2	Game 3	Game 4	Game 5
Türk Telekom	1–3	Pınar Karşıyaka	98–94	81–92	81–84	90–94	—
Fenerbahçe Beko	1–3	Anadolu Efes	108–66	90–92	91–97	78–87	—

=== Finals ===
Team 1	Series	Team 2	Game 1	Game 2	Game 3	Game 4	Game 5
Anadolu Efes	3–0	Pınar Karşıyaka	82–78	85–68	83–74	—	—

== Statistical leaders ==
=== Efficiency ===
Pos	Player	Club	PIR
1	(United States) Tyrique Jones	Türk Telekom	21.44
2	(Colombia) Braian Angola	Pınar Karşıyaka	20.81
3	(Slovenia) Jordan Morgan	AYOS Konyaspor	19.76
4	(Croatia) Ante Žižić	Anadolu Efes	18.94
5	(United States) Errick McCollum	Pınar Karşıyaka	18.12

=== Points ===
Pos	Player	Club	PPG
1	(United States) Jordon Crawford	ONVO Büyükçekmece	19.55
2	(United States) Errick McCollum	Pınar Karşıyaka	18.96
3	(United States) Rob Gray	Tofaş	18.38
4	(Turkey) Onuralp Bitim	Frutti Extra Bursaspor	18.37
5	(United States) Rasheed Sulaimon	AYOS Konyaspor	17.96

=== Rebounds ===
Pos	Player	Club	RPG
1	(United States) O. D. Anosike	Manisa BB	10.75
2	(Dominican Republic) Ángel Delgado	Pınar Karşıyaka	8.90
3	(United States) Tyrique Jones	Türk Telekom	8.67
4	(Senegal) Boubacar Toure	Tofaş	8.17
4	(Croatia) Ante Žižić	Anadolu Efes	7.81

=== Assists ===
Pos	Player	Club	APG
1	(Mexico) Alex Pérez	AYOS Konyaspor	7.50
2	(Turkey) Doğuş Özdemiroğlu	Darüşşafaka Lassa	6.43
3	(Bulgaria) Codi Miller-McIntyre	Gaziantep Basketbol	5.93
4	(United States) Jerian Grant	Türk Telekom	5.77
5	(United States) Jordon Crawford	ONVO Büyükçekmece	5.62

Source: Basketbol Süper Ligi

== Awards ==
All official awards of the 2022–23 Basketbol Süper Ligi.

=== Season awards ===
Award	Player	Team	Ref.
Regular Season MVP	(United States) Tyrique Jones	Türk Telekom	
Finals MVP	(Serbia) Vasilije Micić	Anadolu Efes	

=== MVP of the Round ===
Gameday	Player	Team	EFF	Ref.
1	(United States) Zach Auguste	Frutti Extra Bursaspor	37	
2	(Slovenia) Jordan Morgan	AYOS Konyaspor	29	
2	(Turkey) Doğuş Özdemiroğlu	Darüşşafaka	29	
3	(Turkey) Onuralp Bitim	Frutti Extra Bursaspor	33	
4	(United States) Peyton Aldridge	Petkim Spor	35	
5	(France) Axel Bouteille	Türk Telekom	33	
6	(United States) Errick McCollum	Pınar Karşıyaka	41	
7	(United States) Peyton Aldridge (2)	Petkim Spor	31	
8	(United States) Tyrique Jones	Türk Telekom	29	
8	(Lithuania) Mindaugas Kuzminskas	Pınar Karşıyaka	29	
9	(United States) Errick McCollum (2)	Pınar Karşıyaka	29	
10	(United States) Errick McCollum (3)	Pınar Karşıyaka	37	
11	(France) Jerry Boutsiele	Bahçeşehir Koleji	35	
11	(Canada) Kenny Chery	Petkim Spor	35	
12	(Jamaica) Dylan Ennis	Galatasaray Nef	38	
13	(United States) Zach Auguste (2)	Frutti Extra Bursaspor	41	
14	(France) Axel Bouteille (2)	Türk Telekom	34	
14	(United States) Jaylon Brown	Pınar Karşıyaka	34	
15	(United States) Demetre Rivers	ONVO Büyükçekmece	38	
16	(United States) Jordon Crawford	ONVO Büyükçekmece	33	
17	(Colombia) Braian Angola	Pınar Karşıyaka	32	
17	(United States) John Egbunu	Gaziantep Basketbol	32	
18	(United States) Zach Auguste (3)	Frutti Extra Bursaspor	37	
19	(Colombia) Braian Angola (2)	Pınar Karşıyaka	28	
20	(United States) Parker Jackson-Cartwright	Beşiktaş Emlakjet	41	
21	(United States) Nigel Hayes	Fenerbahçe Beko	36	
22	(United States) Rob Gray	Tofaş	37	
23	(Colombia) Braian Angola (3)	Pınar Karşıyaka	40	
24	(Turkey) Şehmus Hazer	Fenerbahçe Beko	27	
25	(Croatia) Ante Žižić	Anadolu Efes	39	
26	(United States) Errick McCollum (4)	Pınar Karşıyaka	34	
27	(Senegal) Boubacar Toure	Tofaş	32	
28	(United States) Vitto Brown	Pınar Karşıyaka	35	
29	(Croatia) Ante Žižić (2)	Anadolu Efes	29	
30	(Senegal) Boubacar Toure (2)	Tofaş	37	

== Turkish clubs in European competitions ==
Team	Competition	Progress
Anadolu Efes	EuroLeague	Regular Season
Fenerbahçe Beko	EuroLeague	Playoffs
Frutti Extra Bursaspor	EuroCup	Eighthfinals
Türk Telekom	EuroCup	Runners-up
Bahçeşehir Koleji	Champions League	Round of 16
Darüşşafaka Lassa	Champions League	Round of 16
Galatasaray Nef	Champions League	Round of 16
Pınar Karşıyaka	Champions League	Play-ins
Tofaş	Champions League	Play-ins
Gaziantep Basketbol	FIBA Europe Cup	Quarterfinals
Beşiktaş Emlakjet	FIBA Europe Cup	Qualifying rounds
