= Bandırma Bordo Basketbol =

Pizza Bulls Bordo Bandırma
- Leagues: Basketbol Süper Ligi
- Founded: 2023; 3 years ago
- History: List: Bordo Sportif RS (2023–2024) Bandırma Bordo Basketbol (2024–2025) Parmos Bordo BK (2025–2026) Pizza Bulls Bordo Bandırma (2026–present)
- Arena: Bandırma 17 Eylül Üniversitesi Spor Salonu
- Capacity: 2,000
- Location: Bandırma, Balıkesir, Turkey
- Team colors: Burgundy, Gold, Black
- President: Özgür Kızıllar
- Team manager: Haluk Yıldırım
- Head coach: Tutku Açık
- Team captain: Okben Ulubay
- Ownership: Onur Göçmez
- 2025–26 position: TBL; 2nd of 16 (Playoff winner)
- Website: Official website

Bandırma Bordo Basketbol, also known as Pizza Bulls Bordo Bandırma for sponsorship reasons, is a Turkish professional basketball club based in Bandırma, Balıkesir. Founded in 2023, the club currently competes in the Basketbol Süper Ligi, the top-tier basketball league in Turkey.

== History ==
The club was founded in Bandırma in 2023. In its inaugural 2023–24 season, it competed in the Turkish Basketball Second League (TB2L), finishing third in its group with a 9–5 record in 14 games and qualifying for the play-offs. In the play-off stage, the team eliminated Karşıyaka Belediyesi in the first round before being knocked out by Ege Üniversitesi Daçka, thus concluding its first season.

Prior to the 2024–25 season, the club acquired the competition rights of TBL side Iğdır Basketbol, thereby earning the right to compete in the Turkish Basketball League (TBL), the second tier of Turkish basketball. In the 2024–25 TBL season, Bandırma Bordo finished 10th in the regular season, qualifying for the play-in stage. The team lost its play-in game 80–82, ending its first TBL campaign.

=== 2025–26 season: Promotion to the Basketbol Süper Ligi ===
In the 2025–26 season, Bandırma Bordo competed in the Turkish Basketball League (TBL), finishing second in the regular season behind champions Çayırova Belediyesi and advancing to the play-offs. In the play-off quarter-finals, Bandırma Bordo defeated TED Ankara Kolejliler 2–0 to advance to the semi-finals. The team then overcame Göztepe in the semi-final series to reach the finals. In the final series, Bandırma Bordo faced Gaziantep Basketbol. With home-court advantage, the team won the opening game 83–62 and ultimately swept the series 3–0, clinching the TBL play-off championship and securing promotion to the Basketbol Süper Ligi. The decisive third game was won away from home with a score of 79–65, completing an unbeaten run in the final series and confirming the club's historic promotion to the top tier of Turkish basketball.

== Sponsorship naming ==
- Bordo Sportif RS: 2023–2024
- Bandırma Bordo Basketbol: 2024–2025
- Parmos Bordo BK: 2025–2026
- Pizza Bulls Bordo Bandırma: 2026–present

== Home arenas ==
- Bandırma 17 Eylül Üniversitesi Spor Salonu (2023–present)

== Players ==
=== Current roster ===
Pizza Bulls Bordo Bandırma roster
Players
Coaches

Pos.	No.	Nat.	Name	Ht.	Age
PG	0	(United States)	Gordon, Ty	1.85 m (6 ft 1 in)	27 – 20 October 1998
PG	2	(Mexico)	Pérez, Alex (injured)	1.91 m (6 ft 3 in)	33 – 1 July 1993
SF	4	(Turkey)	Ulubay, Okben (C)	2.01 m (6 ft 7 in)	30 – 25 May 1996
PG	5	(Finland)	Maxhuni, Edon	1.88 m (6 ft 2 in)	28 – 21 March 1998
G	7	(Turkey)	Kandemir, Akın	1.96 m (6 ft 5 in)	30 – 8 December 1995
PG	8	(Turkey)	Bayram, Kadir	1.93 m (6 ft 4 in)	30 – 13 September 1996
SG	10	(Turkey)	Sinirlioğlu, Berkay	1.93 m (6 ft 4 in)	31 – 29 November 1994
PF	11	(Turkey)	Demir, Berk	2.03 m (6 ft 8 in)	31 – 18 May 1995
G	13	(Turkey)	Şahin, Özgür	1.91 m (6 ft 3 in)	33 – 12 February 1993
C	21	(Senegal)	Toure, Boubacar	2.11 m (6 ft 11 in)	30 – 31 December 1995
PF	22	(United States)	Aldridge, Peyton	2.03 m (6 ft 8 in)	30 – 10 November 1995
SF	23	(United States)	Jefferson, Damien	1.96 m (6 ft 5 in)	28 – 3 October 1997
F/C	33	(Turkey)	Kızıl, Mehmet		29 – 20 November 1996
C	35	(United States)	Hankins, Zach	2.11 m (6 ft 11 in)	30 – 27 July 1996
PG	77	(United States)	Peterson, Q. J.	1.83 m (6 ft 0 in)	31 – 12 October 1994

Head coach

- (Turkey) Tutku Açık

Assistant coach(es)

- (Turkey) Murat Kaya
- (Turkey) Onur Selimbeyoğlu
- (Turkey) İbrahim Yıldırım

Legend

- (C) Team captain
- Injured

- Roster
Updated: September 20, 2026

Note: Flags indicate national team eligibility at FIBA-sanctioned events. Players may hold other non-FIBA nationalities not displayed.

== Season by season ==
Season	Tier	Division	Pos.	Pos.	W–L	Cup Competitions
2023–24	2	TB2L	3rd	R16	12–8	–
2024–25	2	TBL	10th	–	18–16	–
2025–26	2	TBL	2nd	RU	34–8	–

== Trophies and awards ==
Türkiye Basketbol Ligi

- Runners-up (1): 2025–26
