= Alex Pérez (basketball) =

American basketball player (born 1993)

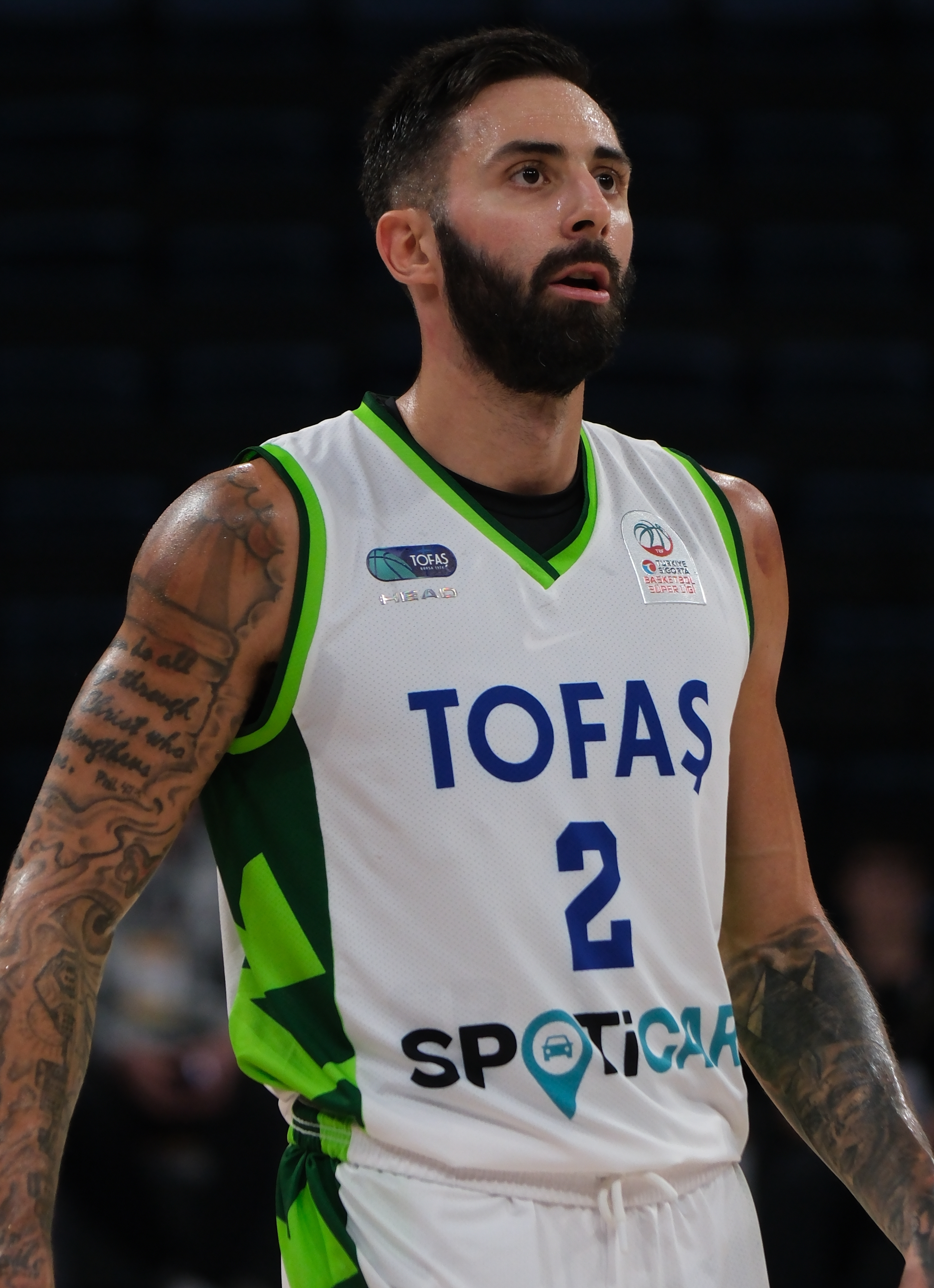
- Pérez with Tofaş in 2025

No. 2 – Pizza Bulls Bordo Bandırma
- Position: Point guard
- League: BSL

Personal information
- Born: July 1, 1993 (age 33) San Diego, California
- Listed height: 6 ft 3 in (1.91 m)
- Listed weight: 190 lb (86 kg)

Career information
- High school: Otay Ranch (Chula Vista, California)
- College: Fresno City College (2011–2013)
- NBA draft: 2013: undrafted
- Playing career: 2013–present

Career history
- 2013–2015: Soles de Mexicali
- 2015: Bucaneros de La Guaira
- 2015–2016: Soles de Mexicali
- 2016: Maccabi Haifa
- 2017: Soles de Mexicali
- 2017: San Lorenzo
- 2017–2018: VEF Rīga
- 2018–2019: Banvit
- 2019: Žalgiris Kaunas
- 2020: Bahçeşehir Koleji
- 2020–2021: Fenerbahçe
- 2021–2022: Türk Telekom
- 2022–2023: Konyaspor
- 2023–2024: Büyükçekmece Basketbol
- 2024–2026: Tofaş
- 2026–present: Bandırma Bordo Basketbol

Career highlights
- 2× TBSL assists leader (2023, 2025); FIBA Champions League steals leader (2019); Estonia/Latvia League All Star (2018); LNB champion (2017); LNBP champion (2015); LNBP All-Star (2016); CVC Player of the Year (2013); CVC Co-Freshman of the Year (2012)
Medals
Men's basketball
Representing Mexico
FIBA AmeriCup
Bronze medal – third place	2017 Argentina

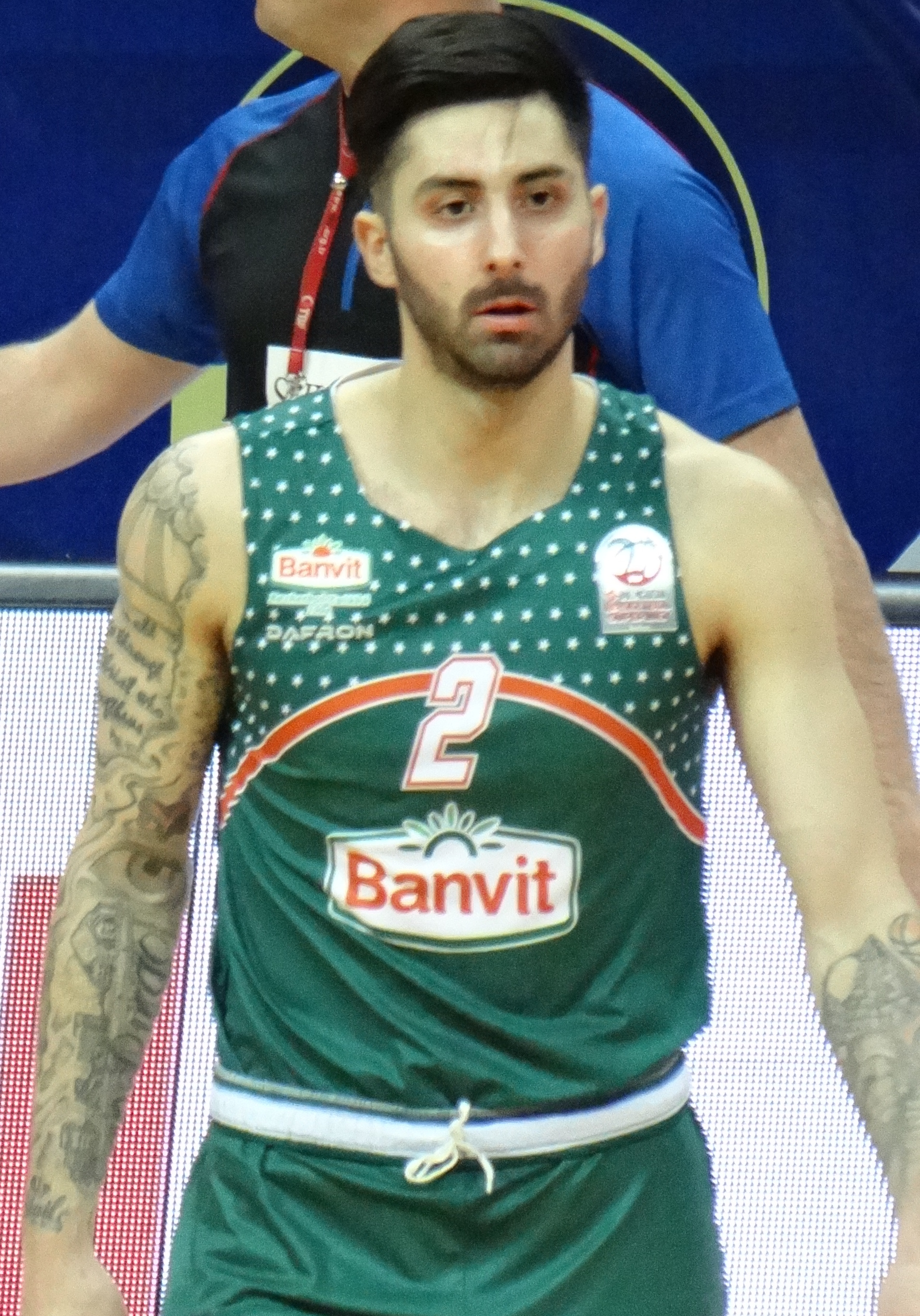
Pérez with Banvit in 2019

Alejandro Daniel "Alex" Pérez Kauffman (born July 1, 1993) is a Mexican-American professional basketball player for Pizza Bulls Bordo Bandırma of the Basketbol Süper Ligi (BSL). He also represents the senior Mexican national basketball team in international competitions.

== Early life ==
Pérez attended Otay Ranch High School in Chula Vista, California, where he played basketball for the Mustangs. He earned a starting role as a freshman and was a co-captain as a sophomore. He missed 17 games in his junior season due to academic ineligibility. As a senior, Pérez was a McDonald’s All-American nominee.

== College career ==
Pérez played basketball at Fresno City College for two years. He was named the Central Valley Conference (CVC) Co-Freshman of the Year in 2012 and the CVC Player of the Year in 2013. Pérez committed to transferring to University of Southern Mississippi. However, he never played for the Eagles basketball team.

== Professional career ==
On June 17, 2016, Pérez signed with the Israeli team Maccabi Haifa for the 2016–17 season.

On July 24, 2017, Pérez signed a one-year deal with the Latvian team VEF Rīga. Pérez helped them to reach the 2018 Latvian League Finals and the 2018 VTB League Quarterfinals. In 55 games played during the 2017–18 season (both in the Latvian League and the VTB League), Pérez averaged 11.8 points, 5.8 assists, 2.7 rebounds and 1.4 steals per game.

On July 4, 2018, Pérez signed with the Turkish team Banvit for the 2018–19 season. He finished the season averaging 14.7 points, 5.6 assists and 2.8 rebounds in the Turkish Basketball Super League, along with 12.8 points, 5.1 assists, 3.4 rebounds and league-high 1.9 steals in the Basketball Champions League.

On July 9, 2019, Pérez signed a three-year deal with Lithuanian club Žalgiris Kaunas.

He signed with Bahçeşehir Koleji of the Turkish Basketball Super League on June 26, 2020. In six games, he averaged 8.8 points, 2.7 rebounds, 5.8 assists and 1.0 steal per game.

On November 14, 2020, Perez signed with Fenerbahçe. On June 17, 2021, Pérez officially parted ways with the Turkish club.

On July 4, 2021, he has signed with Türk Telekom of the Turkish Basketball Super League.

On July 21, 2022, he has signed with Konyaspor of the Turkish Basketbol Süper Ligi (BSL).

On August 2, 2023, he signed with ONVO Büyükçekmece of the Basketbol Süper Ligi (BSL).

On June 19, 2024, he signed with Tofaş of Basketbol Süper Ligi (BSL).

On June 10, 2026, he signed with Bandırma Bordo Basketbol of the Basketbol Süper Ligi (BSL).

== National team career ==
Pérez is a member of the Mexico national basketball team, he participated at the 2017 FIBA AmeriCup.
