= 2023 Turkish Basketball Cup =

- Season: 2022–23
- Duration: Cancelled
- Games played: 7
- Teams: 8

The 2023 Turkish Basketball Cup (Turkish: 2023 Basketbol Erkekler Türkiye Kupası), also known as Bitci Erkekler Türkiye Kupası for sponsorship reasons, is the 37th edition of Turkey's top-tier level professional national domestic basketball cup competition. The quarterfinals of the tournament were originally scheduled to be held on February 14–15, 2023 in 4 different locations and then the semi-finals and the final on February 17–19, 2023, respectively, in the Selçuklu Belediyesi Spor Salonu in Konya, Turkey. However, on 7 February 2023, the Turkish Basketball Federation announced that the competition was suspended indefinitely, after the 2023 Turkey–Syria earthquake.

== Qualified teams ==
The top eight placed teams after the first half of the top-tier level Basketball Super League 2022–23 season qualified for the tournament. The four highest-placed teams are going to play against the lowest-seeded teams in the quarter-finals. The competition will be played under a single elimination format.

Pos	Team	Pld	W	L	PF	PA	PD	Pts	Seeding
1	Fenerbahçe Beko	15	13	2	1293	1157	+136	28	Seeded
2	Türk Telekom	15	12	3	1302	1178	+124	27	Seeded
3	Pınar Karşıyaka	15	11	4	1309	1257	+52	26	Seeded
4	Anadolu Efes	15	10	5	1323	1223	+100	25	Seeded
5	Frutti Extra Bursaspor	15	10	5	1256	1180	+76	25	Unseeded
6	Bahçeşehir Koleji	15	8	7	1137	1161	−24	23	Unseeded
7	Darüşşafaka Lassa	15	8	7	1198	1233	−35	23	Unseeded
8	Galatasaray Nef	15	7	8	1193	1175	+18	22	Unseeded

Source: Basketbol Süper Ligi

== Draw ==
The 2023 Turkish Basketball Cup was drawn on January 23, 2023. The seeded teams were paired in the quarterfinals with the non-seeded teams.

== Bracket ==
Quarterfinals
1	Fenerbahçe Beko	–
5	Frutti Extra Bursaspor	–
4	Anadolu Efes	–
6	Bahçeşehir Koleji	–
2	Türk Telekom	–
8	Galatasaray Nef	–
3	Pınar Karşıyaka	–
7	Darüşşafaka Lassa	–

Semifinals
–	–
–	–
–	–
–	–

Final
–	–
–	–

== Quarterfinals ==
Cancelled QF	Bahçeşehir Koleji	vs.	Anadolu Efes	Istanbul
TRT Spor Yıldız				Arena: Ülker Sports Arena
Note: Originally scheduled for 14 February 2023. Cancelled after the 2023 Turkey–Syria earthquake.

Cancelled QF	Frutti Extra Bursaspor	vs.	Fenerbahçe Beko	Bursa
TRT Spor				Arena: Tofaş Spor Salonu
Note: Originally scheduled for 14 February 2023. Cancelled after the 2023 Turkey–Syria earthquake.

Cancelled QF	Galatasaray Nef	vs.	Türk Telekom	Istanbul
TRT Spor Yıldız		Boxscore		Arena: Sinan Erdem Dome
Note: Originally scheduled for 15 February 2023. Cancelled after the 2023 Turkey–Syria earthquake.

Cancelled QF	Pınar Karşıyaka	vs.	Darüşşafaka Lassa	İzmir
TRT Spor Yıldız		Boxscore		Arena: Karşıyaka Arena
Note: Originally scheduled for 15 February 2023. Cancelled after the 2023 Turkey–Syria earthquake.

== See also ==
- 2022–23 Basketbol Süper Ligi
