= Rasheed Sulaimon =

American-Nigerian basketball player (born 1994)

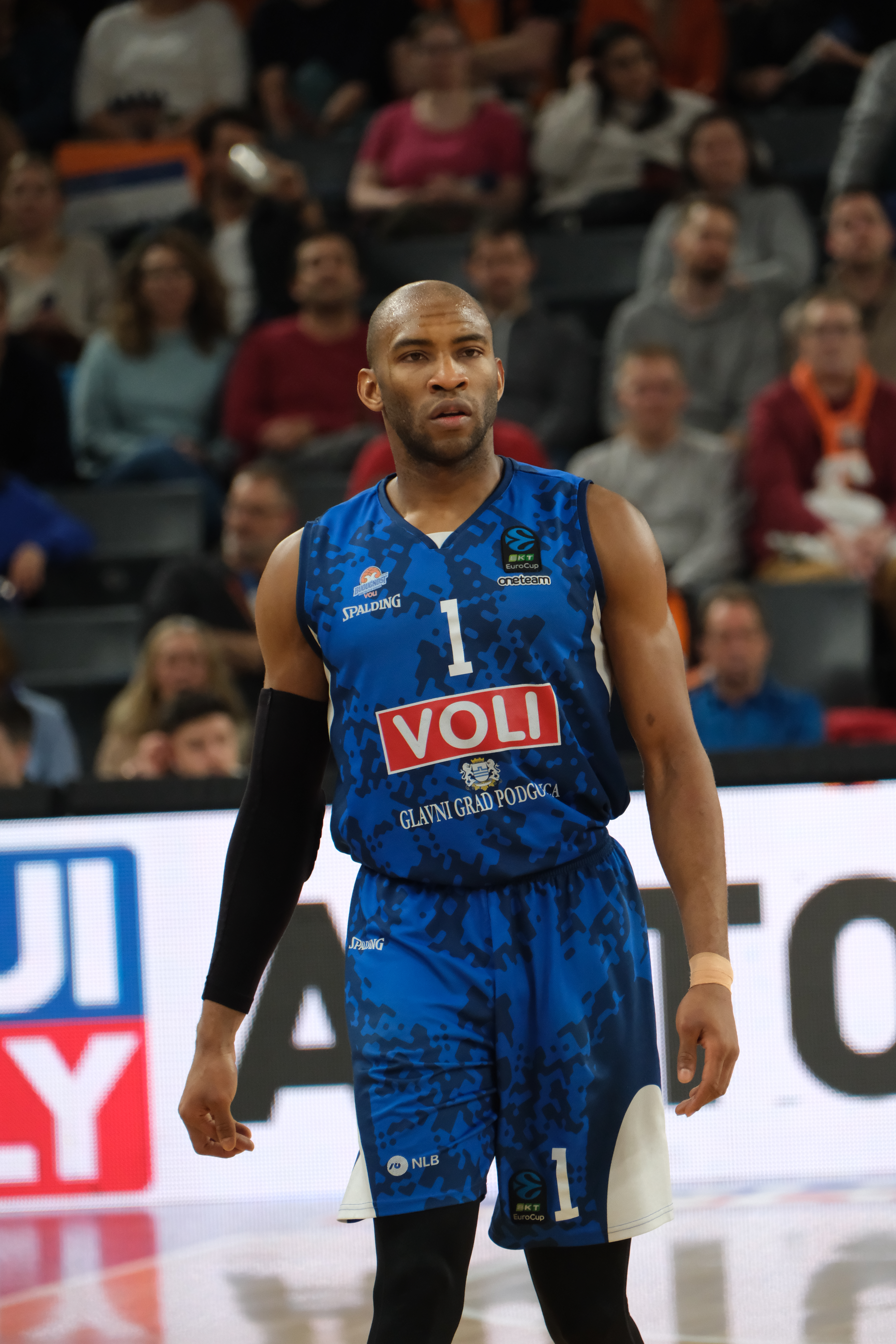
- Sulaimon with Budućnost in 2025

No. 10 – Çayırova Belediyespor
- Position: Shooting guard / point guard
- League: Basketbol Süper Ligi

Personal information
- Born: March 9, 1994 (age 32) Houston, Texas, U.S.
- Listed height: 6 ft 4 in (1.93 m)
- Listed weight: 194 lb (88 kg)

Career information
- High school: Strake Jesuit College Prep (Houston, Texas)
- College: Duke (2012–2015); Maryland (2015–2016)
- NBA draft: 2016: undrafted
- Playing career: 2016–present

Career history
- 2016–2017: Greensboro Swarm
- 2017–2018: JDA Dijon
- 2018–2019: Levallois Metropolitans
- 2019–2020: JDA Dijon
- 2020–2021: Zaragoza
- 2021–2022: JL Bourg
- 2022–2023: Konyaspor
- 2023: Hong Kong Bulls
- 2023–2024: Wolves Vilnius
- 2024–2026: Budućnost
- 2026–present: Çayırova Belediyespor

Career highlights
- LNB Leaders Cup winner (2020); LNB Leaders Cup MVP (2020); Montenegrin Cup winner (2025); Montenegrin League winner (2025); All-LKL Team (2024); LKL Three-point Shootout champion (2024); ACC All-Freshman Team (2013); McDonald's All-American (2012); First-team Parade All-American (2012)
- Stats at Basketball Reference
Medals
Men's basketball
Representing the United States
FIBA World U19 Championship
Gold medal – first place	2013 Czech Republic	National team
FIBA Americas U18 Championship
Gold medal – first place	2012 Brazil	National team

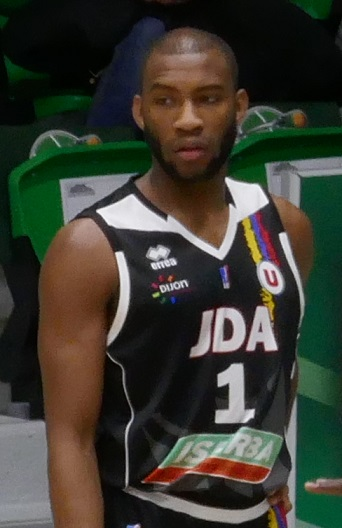

Rasheed Wesley Daranijo Sulaimon (born March 9, 1994) is an American-Nigerian professional basketball player for Çayırova Belediyespor of the Basketbol Süper Ligi (BSL). He was selected as a McDonald's All-American as well as a Jordan Brand Classic All-American in 2012. He played college basketball for the Duke Blue Devils men's basketball team before being dismissed from the team on January 29, 2015. He subsequently transferred to Maryland for his senior season.

== College recruitment ==
Sulaimon played high school basketball at Strake Jesuit College Prep in Houston, TX and was one of the top ranked recruits nationally. Receiving offers from many top colleges around the country, including North Carolina, Arizona, Baylor, Texas and Texas A&M, Sulaimon committed to Duke on February 10, 2011, during an unofficial visit, signing a National Letter of Intent on November 9, 2011.

College recruiting
Name	Hometown	School	Height	Weight	Commit date
Rasheed Sulaimon; SG	Houston, TX	Strake Jesuit College Prep	6 ft 4 in (1.93 m)	185 lb (84 kg)	Feb 10, 2011
Rasheed Sulaimon; SG	Recruit ratings: Scout: Rivals: 247Sports: ESPN:				

== College career ==
Sulaimon began his collegiate career at Duke in 2012. He was named to the ACC All-Freshman team after the 2012-13 season, as well as the All-ACC Academic team. After starting 33 of his 36 games as a freshman, he was relegated to more of a 6th-man role during his sophomore campaign. Sulaimon saw his role diminish again during the 2014-15 season before he was dismissed from the Duke basketball program on January 29, 2015, after appearing in 90 games over three seasons. He was the first player ever dismissed by coach Mike Krzyzewski for failing to meet the standards set for a Duke basketball player. It was later revealed that two women had accused Sulaimon of sexual assault in the months preceding his eventual dismissal.

Sulaimon transferred to Maryland for his senior season, where in 36 games, he averaged 11.3 points on .425 shooting from three-point range, 3.5 rebounds and 3.5 assists in 32.9 minutes per game, garnering a 2015–16 All-Big Ten honorable mention team.

== Professional career ==
After going undrafted in the 2016 NBA draft, Sulaimon joined the Chicago Bulls for the 2016 NBA Summer League. On September 7, 2016, he signed with the Charlotte Hornets, but was waived on October 22 after appearing in four preseason games. On October 31, he was acquired by the Greensboro Swarm of the NBA Development League as an affiliate player of the Hornets.

On July 3, 2020, he signed with Casademont Zaragoza of the Liga ACB. On October 8, Sulaimon was ruled out between six and eight weeks after injuring his leg.

On July 1, 2021, he signed with JL Bourg of LNB Pro A for the 2021–22 season.

On July 15, 2022, Sulaimon signed with Konyaspor of the Turkish Basketbol Süper Ligi (BSL). He averaged 18 points, 4.7 rebounds and 5.2 assists in 23 games played.

On July 5, 2023, he joined with Hong Kong Bulls of the National Basketball League.

On August 14, 2023, Sulaimon signed a one-year deal with BC Wolves of the Lithuanian Basketball League (LKL). He was selected to the All-LKL Team after averaging 16 points, 2.8 rebounds and 2.8 assists per contest.

On June 19, 2026, he signed with Çayırova Belediyespor of the Basketbol Süper Ligi (BSL).

== National team career ==
Sulaimon was selected for the Nigeria national basketball team in November 2020, to play in the AfroBasket 2021 qualification. He was forced to miss the games due to a leg injury, however.

== Awards and honors ==
=== Club ===
JDA Dijon

- LNB Pro A Leaders Cup: (2020)
- LNB Pro A Leaders Cup MVP: (2020)

=== High school ===
- 2011 All American Championship
- 2011 Nike Global Challenge
- 2011 ESPN Boost Mobile Elite 24
- 2012 McDonald's All-American
- 2012 Jordan Brand Classic All American
- 2012 First-team Parade All-American
- 2012 Guy V. Lewis Award winner
