= Altan Erol =

Turkish basketball player (born 1983)

No. 9 – TED Ankara Kolejliler
- Position: Shooting guard
- League: TBL

Personal information
- Born: May 28, 1983 (age 43) Bursa, Turkey
- Listed height: 195 cm (6 ft 5 in)

Career information
- Playing career: 2002–present

Career history
- 2002–2007: Oyak Renault
- 2007–2010: Mersin BB
- 2010–2012: Erdemirspor
- 2012–2014: Mersin BB
- 2014–2017: Gaziantep
- 2017–2019: Afyon Belediye
- 2019–2020: Bahçeşehir Koleji
- 2020–2023: Merkezefendi Bld. Denizli Basket
- 2023–2024: Esenler Erokspor
- 2024–2025: MKE Ankaragücü
- 2025–present: TED Ankara Kolejliler

Career highlights
- TBL All-Star (2012)

Altan Erol (born May 28, 1983) is a Turkish professional basketball player for TED Ankara Kolejliler of the Türkiye Basketbol Ligi.

== Professional career ==
Born in Bursa, Erol played for his local club Oyak Renault from 2002 to 2007. The club played in the Turkish Basketball League from 2002 to 2004 before they were demoted and played in the Turkish Basketball Second League for two seasons, before returning to the first division for the 2006–07 season.

In 2007, Erol joined Mersin BB where he played for three seasons. In June 2010, he signed with Erdemirspor where he was named an All-Star in 2011–12. He then returned to Mersin BB in 2012 where he played a further two seasons.

In June 2014, Erol signed a one-year deal with Royal Halı Gaziantep.

On July 11, 2019, he has signed with Bahçeşehir Koleji of the Turkish Basketbol Süper Ligi.

On January 15, 2020, he has signed with Merkezefendi Belediyesi Denizli Basket of the Turkish Basketball First League.

On July 13, 2023, he signed with Esenler Erokspor of the Türkiye Basketbol Ligi.
