= Boubacar Toure =

American basketball player

No. 21 – Pizza Bulls Bordo Bandırma
- Position: Center
- League: BSL

Personal information
- Born: 31 December 1995 (age 30) Dakar, Senegal
- Listed height: 7 ft 0 in (2.13 m)
- Listed weight: 240 lb (109 kg)

Career information
- High school: Phase One Academy (Mesa, Arizona)
- College: Grand Canyon (2015–2016); Eastern Michigan (2018–2020)
- NBA draft: 2020: undrafted
- Playing career: 2020–present

Career history
- 2020–2022: Chorale Roanne
- 2022–2023: Tofaş
- 2023–2024: Valencia
- 2024–2025: Liaoning Flying Leopards
- 2025: CB Breogán
- 2025–2026: Sendai 89ers
- 2026–present: Bandırma Bordo Basketbol

Career highlights
- MAC All-Defensive Team (2020)

Boubacar Toure (born 31 December 1995) is a Senegalese professional basketball player for Pizza Bulls Bordo Bandırma of the Basketbol Süper Ligi (BSL). He played college basketball for the Grand Canyon Antelopes and Eastern Michigan Eagles.

== Early life ==
Toure was born and grew up in Dakar. The first time he began playing basketball, he decided he wanted to become a professional player. Toure's volleyball coach attempted to get him to give up basketball, but he refused. He attended a prestigious basketball camp in Johannesburg, with NBA coaches in attendance. Toure moved to the United States in 2013 to play basketball. He attended Phase One Academy in Mesa, Arizona, and committed to Grand Canyon University.

== College career ==
Toure was forced to redshirt his first year at Grand Canyon due to not qualifying academically. He averaged 4.4 points and 3.8 rebounds over the course of eight games as a freshman, and posted 14 points against Black Hills State University. Toure missed the remainder of the season with an injury, and was also sidelined during the 2016-17 season after tearing his ACL in practice in the preseason. He transferred to Eastern Michigan. He became the first Eagles player to have back-to-back double-doubles to start his career since 1971. Toure averaged 8.6 points and 7.8 rebounds a game as a junior. He had a season-high 16 rebounds along with 12 points against Northern Illinois on 2 March 2019. As a senior at Eastern Michigan, Toure averaged 10.7 points, 9.3 rebounds, 1.1 steals and 1.4 blocks per game. He was named to the MAC All-Defensive Team as well as Honorable Mention All-MAC. Toure had 13 double-doubles during his senior season, with his last coming in the first round of the MAC Tournament against Kent State with 14 points and 13 rebounds. He finished his career first in Eastern Michigan history with a 65.3 career field-goal percentage, and his 86 blocks rank ninth in program history.

== Professional career ==
On 17 June 2020, Toure signed with Chorale Roanne Basket of the LNB Pro A. He averaged 10 points and 4.5 rebounds, while shooting 70.7% from the field, in his rookie season. On 4 July 2022, he signed with Tofaş of the Turkish BSL. He averaged 11.8 points and 8.2 rebounds in the domestic league, as well as 10.1 points and 6.1 rebounds in the Basketball Champions League.

On 4 July 2023, Toure signed a two-year contract with Valencia of the Spanish Liga ACB. On 30 June 2024, he was released from the Spanish club.

On 7 December 2024, Toure joined the Liaoning Flying Leopards of the Chinese Basketball Association (CBA). On 4 January 2025, his contract was terminated. On 5 February 2025, Toure signed with the CB Breogán of the Liga ACB.

On 20 June 2025, Toure signed with Sendai 89ers of the B.League.

On June 23, 2026, he signed with Bandırma Bordo Basketbol of the Basketbol Süper Ligi (BSL).

== Career statistics ==
Legend
GP	Games played	GS	Games started	MPG	Minutes per game
FG%	Field-goal percentage	3P%	3-point field-goal percentage	FT%	Free-throw percentage
RPG	Rebounds per game	APG	Assists per game	SPG	Steals per game
BPG	Blocks per game	PPG	Points per game	PIR	Performance index rating
**Bold**	Career high

=== EuroLeague ===
Year	Team	GP	GS	MPG	FG%	3P%	FT%	RPG	APG	SPG	BPG	PPG	PIR
2023–24	Valencia	21	8	13.7	.565	—	.542	4.1	.2	.3	.6	4.0	5.5
Career		21	8	13.7	.565	—	.542	4.1	.2	.3	.6	4.0	5.5

== Personal life ==
Toure has one brother and four sisters. Toure is an avid soccer fan, with his favorite team being FC Barcelona. He speaks three languages: English, French, and Wolof.
