= Peyton Aldridge =

American basketball player (born 1995)

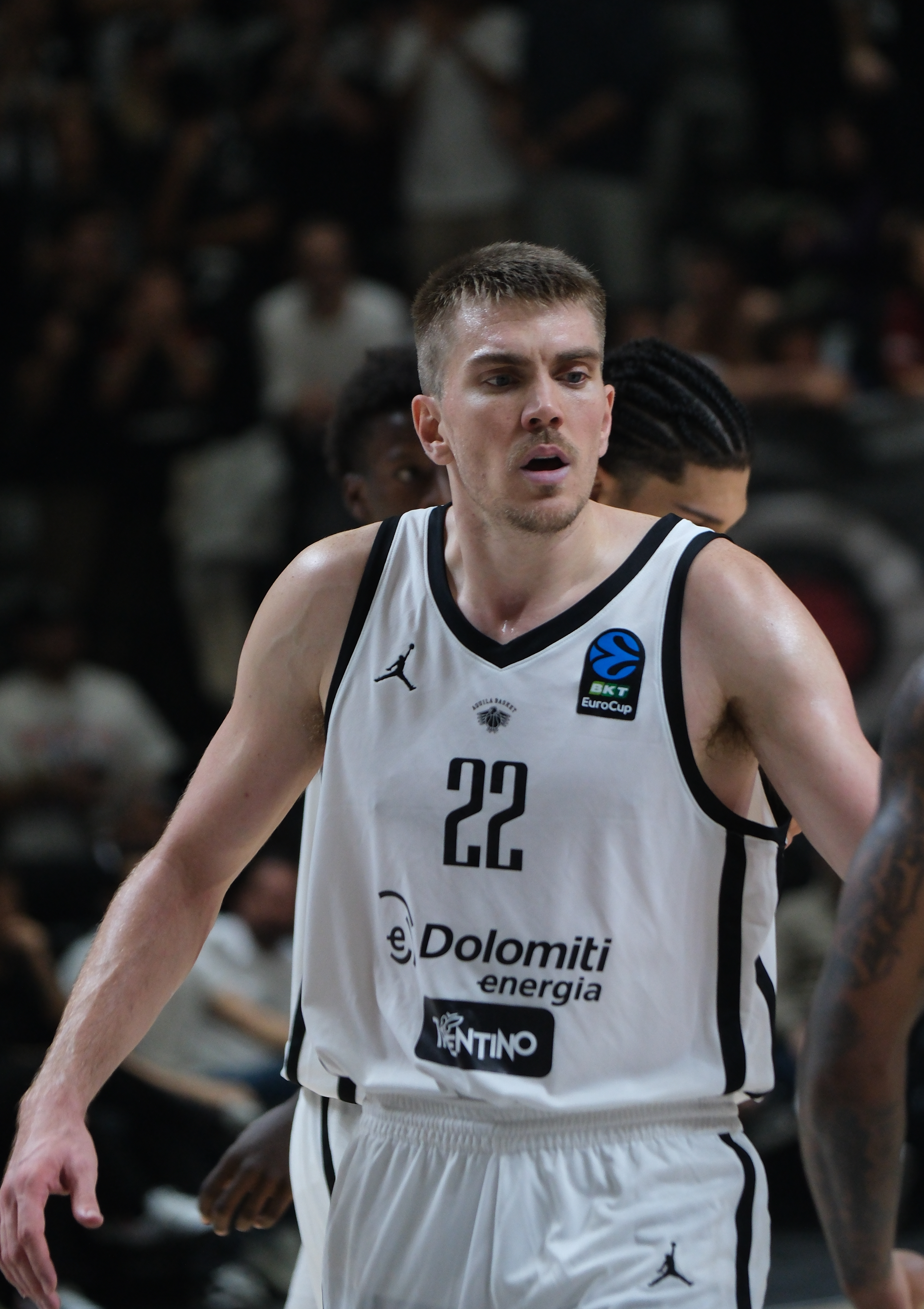
- Aldridge with Aquila Trento in 2025

No. 22 – Pizza Bulls Bordo Bandırma
- Position: Power forward
- League: BSL

Personal information
- Born: November 10, 1995 (age 30) Warren, Ohio, U.S.
- Listed height: 6 ft 8 in (2.03 m)
- Listed weight: 225 lb (102 kg)

Career information
- High school: Labrae (Leavittsburg, Ohio)
- College: Davidson (2014–2018)
- NBA draft: 2018: undrafted
- Playing career: 2018–present

Career history
- 2018–2019: Vanoli Cremona
- 2019–2020: Afyon Belediye
- 2020–2021: Bahçeşehir Koleji
- 2021–2025: Petkim Spor
- 2025–2026: Dolomiti Energia Trento
- 2026–present: Bandırma Bordo Basketbol

Career highlights
- Atlantic 10 co-Player of the Year (2018); First-team All-Atlantic 10 (2018); Second-team All-Atlantic 10 (2017)

Peyton James Aldridge (born November 10, 1995) is an American professional basketball player for Pizza Bulls Bordo Bandırma of the Basketbol Süper Ligi (BSL). He played college basketball for the Davidson Wildcats.

== High school career ==
Aldridge scored 1,735 points in his career at LaBrae High School, a school record. He was also a highly rated quarterback prospect in high school, though basketball remained his favorite sport. Davidson coach Bob McKillop offered him a scholarship after he broke his jaw in a tournament and played the next game anyway. Despite getting looks from the likes of Nick Saban, Aldridge opted not to play football as a senior to focus on basketball.

== College career ==
He averaged 9.4 points and 5.1 rebounds in his freshman year at Davidson. With the graduation of Tyler Kalinoski, Aldridge had a more prominent role as a sophomore, averaging 15.5 points and a team-best 6.5 rebounds per game. As a junior, he was named to the Second team All-Atlantic 10. He averaged 20.5 points per game as a second option to Jack Gibbs.

Aldridge scored his 2,000th point in a Davidson uniform in a win against Fordham on February 21, 2018. Aldridge scored 45 points in a triple overtime loss to St. Bonaventure on February 28, and was named CBS Sports player of the week. As a senior, Aldridge averaged 21.3 points per game, leading Davidson to a third-place finish in the Atlantic 10. He was named conference co-Player of the Year with Jaylen Adams.

== Professional career ==
After going undrafted in the 2018 NBA draft, Aldridge was later included in the 2018 NBA Summer League roster of the Utah Jazz. On July 22, 2018, Aldridge went to Italy and signed with Vanoli Cremona where he averaged 11.5 points in 29 games. The Memphis Grizzlies added Aldridge to their 2019 summer league roster.

On September 2, 2019, Aldridge signed with Afyon Belediye of the Turkish Basketball Super League. He averaged 11.0 points and 4.9 rebounds per game, shooting 44.2% from the 3-point arc.

On July 2, 2020, Aldridge signed with Bahçeşehir Koleji. He averaged 4.6 points and 2.6 rebounds per game.

On July 22, 2021, Aldridge signed with Petkim Spor of the Turkish Basketball Super League (BSL).

On August 2, 2025, he signed with Dolomiti Energia Trento of the Italian Lega Basket Serie A (LBA).

On July 8, 2026, he signed with Bandırma Bordo Basketbol of the Basketbol Süper Ligi (BSL).

== Personal life ==
Aldridge is the son of Rick and Lisa Aldridge. He has one sibling, Courtney. On July 19, 2024, Aldridge married Sara Price in Columbiana, Ohio.
