= Rob Gray (basketball) =

American basketball player (born 1994)

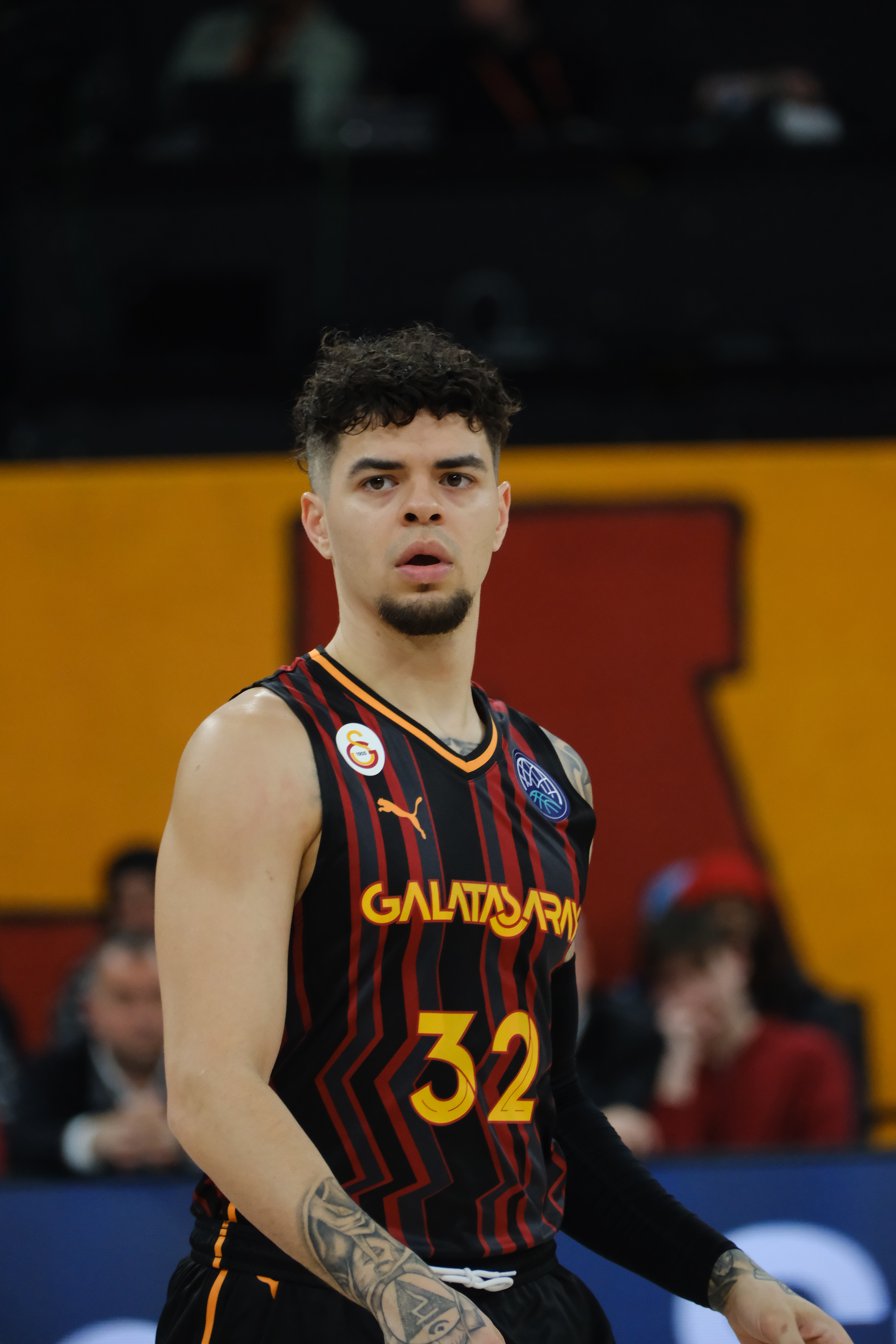
- Gray playing for Galatasaray in 2025

No. 32 – Suke Lions
- Position: Shooting guard / point guard
- League: NBL

Personal information
- Born: April 3, 1994 (age 32) Forest City, North Carolina, U.S.
- Listed height: 6 ft 1 in (1.85 m)
- Listed weight: 180 lb (82 kg)

Career information
- High school: East Rutherford (Bostic, North Carolina); Christ School (Asheville, North Carolina); West Oaks Academy (Orlando, Florida)
- College: Howard College (2014–2015); Houston (2015–2018)
- NBA draft: 2018: undrafted
- Playing career: 2018–present

Career history
- 2018–2019: Fort Wayne Mad Ants
- 2019: JL Bourg
- 2019–2020: Metropolitans 92
- 2020–2022: AS Monaco
- 2022–2023: Tofaş
- 2023–2024: Prometey
- 2024: Breogán
- 2024–2025: Scafati
- 2025: Galatasaray
- 2025–2026: Promitheas Patras
- 2026–present: Suke Lions

Career highlights
- EuroCup champion (2021); EuroCup Finals MVP (2021); Lega Serie A Top Scorer (2025); 2× First-team All-AAC (2017, 2018)
- Stats at Basketball Reference

Robert Dejuan Gray Jr. (born April 3, 1994) is an American professional basketball player for the Suke Lions of the Chinese National Basketball League (NBL). He played college basketball at Howard College and later for the Houston Cougars.

== Early life ==
Gray played at East Rutherford High School as a sophomore, averaging 22.5 points, 4.5 rebounds and 2.3 assists per game. He transferred to Christ School and led the team to a 32–5 record and averaged 11.3 points per game as a junior. Gray finished up his prep school career at West Oaks Academy in Florida.

== College career ==
Gray began his collegiate career at Howard College, redshirting his first season. He was originally going to transfer to Tennessee but then coach Donnie Tyndall was fired. Gray accepted a scholarship to Houston when leading scorer Jherrod Stiggers turned pro a year early. As a sophomore at Houston, Gray was suspended for a game versus SMU by coach Kelvin Sampson for being too selfish and not playing good defense despite his high scoring. He averaged 20.6 points per game as a junior.

Gray was suspended in the first game of his senior season due to playing in a church league after his friend paid the $5 admission fee. Gray became the American Athletic Conference's all-time scoring leader on February 11 in a 73–42 victory over Tulane, breaking the record set by Nic Moore. In the AAC Tournament, he scored 33 points in a 77–74 victory over Wichita State. Gray hit the game-winning layup with 1.1 seconds to go to beat San Diego State 67–65 in the first round of the NCAA Tournament. He finished with a career-high 39 points. He scored a conference-leading 19.3 points per game and dished out 4.4 assists per game as a senior. Gray was named to the First Team All-AAC for the second straight year.

Gray scored 1,710 points in his career, which was the highest mark in the AAC when he graduated, though this has since been surpassed by Quinton Rose. Gray graduated from the University of Houston in December 2017 with a degree in sociology.

== Professional career ==
After going undrafted in the 2018 NBA draft, Gray was signed by the Houston Rockets for their summer league team in June 2018. Gray played on their summer league team, but due to injuries his minutes were significantly limited. On August 10, 2018, Gray later joined the Rockets for training camp. On October 8, 2018, Gray was waived by the Rockets.

=== Fort Wayne Mad Ants ===
Gray was selected in the second round of the 2018 NBA G League draft by the Fort Wayne Mad Ants. He was subsequently added to the training camp roster.

=== JL Bourg ===
On March 29, 2019, Gray signed with Pro A team JL Bourg.

=== Metropolitans 92 ===
On May 28, 2019, Gray signed with another team in Pro A team, Metropolitans 92, for the 2019–2020 season. He averaged 14.5 points, 2.9 rebounds, and 2.8 assists per game. On June 17, 2020, Gray signed a contract extension. In four games during the 2020–21 season, he averaged 10 points, 1.3 rebounds and 1.8 assists per game.

=== AS Monaco ===
On October 29, 2020, Gray signed with AS Monaco. He led the team to the Eurocup championship and averaged 17.2 points per game. On July 23, 2021, Gray signed a two-year extension with the team.

=== Tofaş ===
On June 25, 2022, Gray signed with Tofaş of the Turkish BSL.

=== BC Prometey ===
On November 16, 2023, he signed with BC Prometey of the Latvian–Estonian Basketball League.

=== Scafati Basket ===
On June 19, 2024, he signed with Scafati Basket of the Lega Basket Serie A (LBA).

=== Galatasaray ===
On March 28, 2025, Gray signed with Galatasaray of the Turkish BSL.

On June 26, 2025, Galatasaray thanked the player and announced that they had parted ways.

=== Suke Lions ===
On September 19, 2026, Gray signed with Suke Lions of the Chinese National Basketball League.

== Career statistics ==
Legend
| GP | Games played | GS | Games started | MPG | Minutes per game |
| FG% | Field goal percentage | 3P% | 3-point field goal percentage | FT% | Free throw percentage |
| RPG | Rebounds per game | APG | Assists per game | SPG | Steals per game |
| BPG | Blocks per game | PPG | Points per game | **Bold** | Career high |

=== College ===
| Year | Team | GP | GS | MPG | FG% | 3P% | FT% | RPG | APG | SPG | BPG | PPG |
|---|---|---|---|---|---|---|---|---|---|---|---|---|
| 2015–16 | Houston | 26 | 9 | 26.5 | .435 | .343 | .704 | 2.2 | 1.5 | **1.2** | **.2** | 16.0 |
| 2016–17 | Houston | 31 | 29 | **32.3** | **.473** | **.382** | **.813** | **3.7** | 2.9 | **1.2** | **.2** | **20.6** |
| 2017–18 | Houston | **34** | **34** | 31.9 | .447 | .359 | .802 | **3.7** | **4.4** | 1.1 | .1 | 19.3 |
| Career | | 91 | 72 | 30.5 | .453 | .362 | .783 | 3.3 | 3.0 | 1.2 | .2 | 18.8 |
