= Konyaspor Basketbol =

Turkish basketball club

- Leagues: TBL
- Founded: February 27, 2019; 6 years ago
- History: Selçuklu Belediyesi (1973–2018); Konyaspor Basketbol (2018–present)
- Arena: Selçuklu Belediyesi Spor Salonu
- Capacity: 4,200
- Location: Konya, Turkey
- Team colors: Green and White
- President: Fatih Özgökçen
- Head coach: Can Sevim
- Team captain: Cevher Özer
- Website: konyaspor.org.tr
Home	Away

Buyuksehir Hastanes Konyaspor, is a professional basketball team that represents Konya in the Türkiye Basketbol Ligi (TBL). It is the basketball section of the Konyaspor football club.

== History ==
The history of Konyaspor's basketball branch dates back to the 1950s. The branch, which was closed and reopened several times over time due to financial reasons, was finally put into operation on February 27, 2019, with the takeover of the branch affiliated to Selçuklu Belediyespor. Thus, the team in the Turkish Basketball League in the 2018–19 season finished the league in 7th place. The team finished the season in the 9th place due to the fact that the league in the 2019–20 season was interrupted due to the pandemic. The team, which said goodbye to the Federation Cup in the 2020–21 season as a result of the group matches, finished the regular season in the 3rd place in the league and said goodbye to the season as a result of the play-off semi-finals. The team said goodbye to the Federation Cup in the semi-finals in the 2021–22 season and finished the regular season in the 3rd place in the league. In the play-off quarter-finals, the green and white team advanced to the finals by beating TED Ankara Kolejliler 2-1 in the series and 3-1 in the semi-finals by overtaking their rival ITU, and in the final they beat their rival Samsunspor 3-1 in the series.

== Notable players ==
- Matt Coleman III
- Derek Ogbeide
