= 2020–21 Fenerbahçe S.K. (basketball) season =

Turkish professional basketball team season

Fenerbahçe
2020–21 season
- President: Ali Koç
- Head coach: Igor Kokoškov
- Arena: Ülker Sports and Event Hall
- Basketbol Süper Ligi: 2nd seed
- Playoffs: Runners-up
- EuroLeague: 7th seed
- Playoffs: Quarterfinals
- PIR leader: (France) de Colo 18.6
- Scoring leader: (France) de Colo 18.1
- Rebounding leader: (United States) O'Quinn 6.0
- Assists leader: (France) de Colo 5.5
| Home | Away |

The 2020–21 season was Fenerbahçe's 107th season in the existence of the club. The team played in the Basketball Super League and in the Euroleague.

== Players ==
=== Squad information ===
Note: Flags indicate national team eligibility at FIBA-sanctioned events. Players may hold other non-FIBA nationalities not displayed.

Fenerbahçe roster
Players
Coaches

| Pos. | No. | Nat. | Name | Ht. | Wt. | Age |
|---|---|---|---|---|---|---|
| G | 4 | (United States) | Brown, Lorenzo | 1.96 m (6 ft 5 in) | 86 kg (190 lb) | 30 – 26 August 1990 |
| G | 5 | (Mexico) | Pérez, Alex | 1.91 m (6 ft 3 in) | 86 kg (190 lb) | 27 – 1 July 1993 |
| SG | 8 | (Serbia) | Gudurić, Marko | 1.98 m (6 ft 6 in) | 91 kg (201 lb) | 26 – 8 March 1995 |
| G | 10 | (Turkey) | Mahmutoğlu, Melih (C) | 1.91 m (6 ft 3 in) | 85 kg (187 lb) | 31 – 12 May 1990 |
| F/C | 11 | (United States) | O'Quinn, Kyle | 2.06 m (6 ft 9 in) | 113 kg (249 lb) | 31 – 26 March 1990 |
| F | 13 | (Turkey) | Biberovic, Tarık | 2.01 m (6 ft 7 in) | 100 kg (220 lb) | 20 – 28 January 2001 |
| F | 17 | (Turkey) | Onan, Yiğit | 2.05 m (6 ft 9 in) | | 18 – 12 July 2002 |
| SG | 19 | (France) | de Colo, Nando | 1.96 m (6 ft 5 in) | 91 kg (201 lb) | 33 – 23 June 1987 |
| F | 21 | (Canada) | Pierre, Dyshawn | 1.98 m (6 ft 6 in) | 104 kg (229 lb) | 27 – 17 November 1993 |
| F | 22 | (Germany) | Barthel, Danilo | 2.08 m (6 ft 10 in) | 100 kg (220 lb) | 29 – 24 October 1991 |
| F/C | 24 | (Czech Republic) | Veselý, Jan | 2.13 m (7 ft 0 in) | 110 kg (243 lb) | 31 – 24 April 1990 |
| G | 25 | (Turkey) | Sipahi, Kenan | 1.97 m (6 ft 6 in) | 88 kg (194 lb) | 26 – 26 May 1995 |
| F | 31 | (United States) | Eddie, Jarell | 2.01 m (6 ft 7 in) | 100 kg (220 lb) | 29 – 30 October 1991 |
| F | 32 | (Turkey) | Candan, Berkay | 2.06 m (6 ft 9 in) | 101 kg (223 lb) | 28 – 22 May 1993 |
| PG | 35 | (Turkey) | Muhammed, Ali (DC) | 1.78 m (5 ft 10 in) | 73 kg (161 lb) | 38 – 10 April 1983 |
| C | 44 | (Turkey) | Düverioğlu, Ahmet (DC) | 2.10 m (6 ft 11 in) | 121 kg (267 lb) | 28 – 4 March 1993 |
| SG | 92 | (Lithuania) | Ulanovas, Edgaras | 1.99 m (6 ft 6 in) | 94 kg (207 lb) | 29 – 7 January 1992 |

Head coach

- (Serbia) Igor Kokoškov

Assistant coach(es)

- (Slovenia) Rado Trifunović
- (Turkey) Erdem Can
- (Turkey) Serhan Aydanarığ
- (Turkey) Berkay Oğuz

Athletic trainer(s)

- (Turkey) İlker Belgutay
- (Serbia) Predrag Zimonjić

Physiotherapist(s)

- (Turkey) Rıza Özdemir

Team manager

- (Italy) Maurizio Gherardini
- (Turkey) Cenk Renda

Legend

- (C) Team captain
- (DC) Dual citizenship
- Injured

- Roster
Updated: January 24, 2021

=== Depth chart ===
| Pos. | Starting 5 | Bench | Bench 3 |
|---|---|---|---|
| C | Jan Veselý | Ahmet Düverioğlu |
| PF | Danilo Barthel |
| SF | Dyshawn Pierre | | Tarik Biberovic |
| SG | Marko Gudurić | Melih Mahmutoğlu |
| PG | Nando de Colo |

=== Transactions ===
==== In ====
| No. | Pos. | Nat. | Name | Age | Moving from | | Ends | Date | Source |
|---|---|---|---|---|---|---|---|---|---|
| 21 | G/F | (Canada) | Dyshawn Pierre | 26 | Dinamo Sassari | (Italy) | June 2021 | 8 July 2020 | |
| 92 | SF | (Lithuania) | Edgaras Ulanovas | 28 | Žalgiris | (Lithuania) | June 2022 | 9 July 2020 | |
| 2 | C | (Trinidad and Tobago) | Johnny Hamilton | 26 | Darüşşafaka Tekfen | (Turkey) | June 2021 | 10 July 2020 | |
| 22 | PF | (Germany) | Danilo Barthel | 28 | Bayern Munich | (Germany) | June 2022 | 13 July 2020 | |
| 4 | PG | (United States) | Lorenzo Brown | 29 | Crvena zvezda | (Serbia) | June 2021 | 14 July 2020 | |
| 31 | SF | (United States) | Jarell Eddie | 28 | Murcia | (Spain) | June 2021 | 27 July 2020 | |
| 25 | PG | (Turkey) | Kenan Sipahi | 25 | Real Betis | (Spain) | June 2021 | 27 July 2020 | |
| 5 | PG | (Mexico) | Alex Pérez | 27 | Bahçeşehir Koleji | (Turkey) | June 2021 | 21 November 2020 | |
| 8 | G/F | (Serbia) | Marko Gudurić | 25 | Memphis Grizzlies | (United States) | June 2023 | 18 December 2020 | |
| 11 | F/C | (United States) | Kyle O'Quinn | 30 | Philadelphia 76ers | (United States) | June 2021 | 20 January 2021 | |

==== Out ====
| No. | Pos. | Nat. | Name | Age | Moving to | | Date | Source |
|---|---|---|---|---|---|---|---|---|
| 70 | F | (Italy) | Luigi Datome | 32 | AX Olimpia Milan | (Italy) | 30 June 2020 | |
| 18 | SF | (Turkey) | Egehan Arna | 23 | Beşiktaş | (Turkey) | 7 July 2020 | |
| 21 | PF | (United States) | Derrick Williams | 29 | Valencia | (Spain) | 8 July 2020 | |
| 77 | F/C | (France) | Joffrey Lauvergne | 28 | Žalgiris | (Lithuania) | 14 July 2020 | |
| 12 | F | (Serbia) | Nikola Kalinić | 28 | Valencia | (Spain) | 18 July 2020 | |
| 16 | G | (Greece) | Kostas Sloukas | 30 | Olympiacos | (Greece) | 23 July 2020 | |
| 23 | PF | (United States) | Malcolm Thomas | 31 | Bayern Munich | (Germany) | 27 July 2020 | |
| 2 | SF | (United States) | James Nunnally | 29 | New Orleans Pelicans | (United States) | June 2020 | |
| 9 | PG | (France) | Léo Westermann | 28 | Barcelona | (Spain) | 22 December 2020 | |

==== Out on loan ====
| No. | Pos. | Nat. | Name | Age | Moving to | | Date | Source |
|---|---|---|---|---|---|---|---|---|
| 3 | SF | (Turkey) | Ergi Tırpancı | 20 | OGM Ormanspor | (Turkey) | 13 August 2020 | |
| 8 | SG | (Turkey) | Ekrem Sancaklı | 19 | Afyon Belediye S.K. | (Turkey) | 21 August 2020 | |
| | SF | (Turkey) | İsmail Karabilen | 19 | Afyon Belediye S.K. | (Turkey) | 17 September 2020 | |
| 2 | C | (Trinidad and Tobago) | Johnny Hamilton | 26 | Mornar Bar | (Montenegro) | 25 January 2021 | |

== Pre-season and friendlies ==
=== Friendly match ===
| 1 September 2020 | Fenerbahçe Beko | 79–77 | Beşiktaş | Istanbul |
| 14:00 | Scoring by quarter: 17–16, 20–16, 19–20, 23–25 |
| | Pts: Mahmutoğlu 21; Rebs: Pierre 7 Asts: Brown 5 | Report | Pts: Şengün, Arna 12 | Arena: Ülker Sports and Event Hall |

| 6 September 2020 | Tofaş | 70–82 | Fenerbahçe Beko | Bursa |
| | Scoring by quarter: 11–20, 23–27, 21–19, 15–16 |
| | | Report | Pts: Eddie 20; Rebs: Veselý 7 Asts: Brown 8 | Arena: Mustafa Vehbi Koç Spor Salonu |

| 9 September 2020 Gloria Cup 1 | Fenerbahçe Beko | 65–72 | Pınar Karşıyaka | Antalya |
| 17:30 | Scoring by quarter: 17–21, 17–22, 12–14, 19–15 |
| | Pts: Mahmutoğlu 16 | Report | | Arena: Gloria Sports Arena |

| 11 September 2020 Gloria Cup 2 | Fenerbahçe Beko | vs. | Türk Telekom | Antalya |
| 17:30 |
| | | Report | | Arena: Gloria Sports Arena |
Note: Cancelled due to COVID-19 pandemic.

| 18 September 2020 TÜBAD Mehmet Baturalp 1 | Fenerbahçe Beko | 93–81 | Galatasaray | Istanbul |
| 21:00 | Scoring by quarter: 30-21, 21-26, 22-16, 20-18 |
| | Pts: de Colo 16 | Report | | Arena: Sinan Erdem Dome |

| 20 September 2020 TÜBAD Mehmet Baturalp 2 | Darüşşafaka Tekfen | 72–94 | Fenerbahçe Beko | Istanbul |
| 21:00 | Scoring by quarter: 20-31, 17-19, 14-25, 21-19 |
| | | Report | Pts: Eddie 18 | Arena: Sinan Erdem Dome |

== Competitions ==
=== Overview ===
| Competition | First match | Last match | Starting round | Final position | Record | | | | | | | |
| Competition | First match | Last match | Starting round | Final position | Pld | W | D | L | PF | PA | PD | Win % |
|---|---|---|---|---|---|---|---|---|---|---|---|---|
| Basketball Super League | 26 September 2020 | 7 June 2021 | Round 1 | Runners-up | 38 | 27 | 0 | 11 | 3,266 | 2,946 | +320 | 71.05 |
| EuroLeague | 2 October 2020 | 28 April 2021 | Round 1 | Quarterfinals | 37 | 20 | 0 | 17 | 2,872 | 2,634 | +238 | 54.05 |
| Total | | | | | 75 | 47 | 0 | 28 | 6,138 | 5,580 | +558 | 62.67 |

Source: Competitions

=== Basketball Super League ===
==== League table ====
| Pos | Team | Pld | W | L | PF | PA | PD | Pts | Qualification or relegation |
|---|---|---|---|---|---|---|---|---|---|
| 1 | Anadolu Efes | 30 | 29 | 1 | 2664 | 2267 | +397 | 59 | Advance to playoffs |
| 2 | Fenerbahçe Beko | 30 | 22 | 8 | 2627 | 2291 | +336 | 52 | Advance to playoffs |
| 3 | Pınar Karşıyaka (Note: Pınar Karşıyaka have been deducted 1 point.) | 30 | 21 | 9 | 2527 | 2320 | +207 | 50 | Advance to playoffs |
| 4 | Tofaş | 30 | 19 | 11 | 2597 | 2444 | +153 | 49 | Advance to playoffs |
| 5 | Beşiktaş Icrypex (Note: Beşiktaş have been deducted 1 point.) | 30 | 19 | 11 | 2567 | 2435 | +132 | 48 | Advance to playoffs |

Source: Basketbol Süper Ligi

==== Results summary ====
| Overall | | | | | | Home | | | | | Away | | | | |
| Pld | W | L | PF | PA | PD | W | L | PF | PA | PD | W | L | PF | PA | PD |
|---|---|---|---|---|---|---|---|---|---|---|---|---|---|---|---|
| 30 | 22 | 8 | 2627 | 2291 | +336 | 11 | 3 | 1317 | 1042 | +275 | 11 | 5 | 1310 | 1249 | +61 |

Source: bsl.org.tr

==== Results by round ====
| Round | 1 | 2 | 3 | 4 | 5 | 6 | 7 | 8 | 9 | 10 | 11 | 12 | 13 | 14 | 15 | 16 | 17 | 18 | 19 | 20 | 21 | 22 | 23 | 24 | 25 | 26 | 27 | 28 | 29 | 30 |
|---|---|---|---|---|---|---|---|---|---|---|---|---|---|---|---|---|---|---|---|---|---|---|---|---|---|---|---|---|---|---|
| Ground | H | A | H | A | H | A | H | A | H | A | H | A | H | A | A | A | H | A | H | A | H | A | H | A | H | A | H | A | H | H |
| Result | W | W | W | W | W | W | W | W | W | L | W | L | W | L | W | W | L | W | L | W | L | W | W | W | W | W | W | L | L | W |
| Position | 1 | 1 | 1 | 2 | 1 | 2 | 2 | 2 | 1 | 1 | 1 | 1 | 1 | 2 | 2 | 2 | 3 | 3 | 3 | 3 | 3 | 3 | 3 | 3 | 3 | 2 | 2 | 2 | 2 | 2 |

Source: TBF.org.tr
A = Away; H = Home; W = Win; L = Loss

==== Matches ====
| 26 September 2020 1 | Fenerbahçe Beko | 105–72 | OGM Ormanspor | Istanbul |
| 13:00 | Scoring by quarter: 20–15, 32–16, 25–19, 28–22 |
| | Pts: de Colo 22; Rebs: Düverioğlu 7 Asts: Sipahi 5 PIR: de Colo 26 | Boxscore | Pts: Bayram 17; Rebs: Hagins 8 Asts: five players 2 PIR: Hagins 20 | Arena: Ülker Sports and Event Hall; Attendance: 0 Referees: Özlem Yalman, Mehmet Ozan Çakar, Serhat Büker |

| 4 October 2020 2 | Beşiktaş | 74–83 | Fenerbahçe Beko | Istanbul |
| 20:00 | Scoring by quarter: 14–27, 22–27, 17–11, 21–18 |
| | Pts: Şengün 21; Rebs: Şengün 7 Asts: four players 3 PIR: Şengün 32 | Boxscore | Pts: Brown 16; Rebs: Pierre 9 Asts: Dixon 6 PIR: Brown 20 | Arena: Akatlar Arena; Attendance: 0 Referees: Emin Moğulkoç, Can Mavisu, Hüseyin Çelik |

| 11 October 2020 3 | Fenerbahçe Beko | 113–74 | Fethiye Belediyespor | Istanbul |
| 13:00 | Scoring by quarter: 39–24, 21–17, 32–10, 21–23 |
| | Pts: Hamilton, Eddie 18; Rebs: Hamilton, Candan 7 Asts: Westermann 12; PIR: four players 21 | Boxscore | Pts: Abu 30; Rebs: Abu 9 Asts: three players 3 PIR: Abu 27 | Arena: Ülker Sports and Event Hall; Attendance: 0 Referees: Osman Sinan İşgüder, Sinem Tetik, Orhan Çağrı Hekimoğlu |

| 18 October 2020 4 | Gaziantep Basketbol | 59–65 | Fenerbahçe Beko | Gaziantep |
| 15:15 | Scoring by quarter: 12–24, 16–17, 6–12, 25–15 |
| | Pts: Jaiteh 18; Rebs: Jaiteh 15; Asts: Ulusoy 7 PIR: Jaiteh 24 | Boxscore | Pts: Ulanovas 11; Rebs: Barthel 7 Asts: Westermann, Barthel 4 PIR: three players 12 | Arena: Karataş Şahinbey Sport Hall; Attendance: 0 Referees: Mehmet Karabilecen, Halil Baldemir, Polat Parlak |

| 25 October 2020 5 | Fenerbahçe Beko | 93–70 | Petkim Spor | Istanbul |
| 13:00 | Scoring by quarter: 29–17, 22–22, 21–15, 21–16 |
| | Pts: Düverioğlu 14; Rebs: Düverioğlu 9 Asts: Brown 8 PIR: Brown 23 | Boxscore | Pts: Wimbush 16; Rebs: Wimbush 6 Asts: Arar 5 PIR: Hummber 19 | Arena: Ülker Sports and Event Hall; Attendance: 0 Referees: Mehmet Keseratar, Aytuğ Ekti, Ali Köseoğlu |

| 31 October 2020 6 | Tofaş | 103–104 | Fenerbahçe Beko | Bursa |
| 20:00 | Scoring by quarter: 28–24, 23–26, 15–23, 37–31 |
| | Pts: Akoon-Purcell 37; Rebs: Akoon-Purcell 7 Asts: Uğurlu 10; PIR: Akoon-Purcell 41 | Boxscore | Pts: de Colo 28; Rebs: Veselý 6 Asts: de Colo, Veselý 7 PIR: Veselý 29 | Arena: Tofaş Nilüfer Spor Salonu; Attendance: 0 Referees: Kerem Baki, Ziya Özorhon, Mehmet Şahin |

| 8 November 2020 7 | Fenerbahçe Beko | 90–79 | Darüşşafaka Tekfen | Istanbul |
| 13:00 | Scoring by quarter: 19–17, 20–19, 23–21, 28–22 |
| | Pts: Brown 22; Rebs: Brown, Veselý 5 Asts: Brown 5 PIR: Brown, Veselý 22 | Boxscore | Pts: Jerrett 24; Rebs: Luther 10; Asts: Özdemiroğlu 4 PIR: Jerrett 29 | Arena: Ülker Sports and Event Hall; Attendance: 0 Referees: Alper Altuğ Köselerli, Kaan Büyükçil, Serhat Büker |

| 14 November 2020 8 | Türk Telekom | 81–82 | Fenerbahçe Beko | Ankara |
| 15:15 | Scoring by quarter: 21–15, 22–21, 17–26, 21–20 |
| | Pts: Dekker 20; Rebs: Eric 14; Asts: Johnson 7 PIR: Dekker 24 | Boxscore | Pts: Brown 16; Rebs: Eddie 7 Asts: Brown 6 PIR: Brown 18 | Arena: Ankara Arena; Attendance: 0 Referees: Erşan Kartal, Can Mavisu, Seher Ayşe Nur Yazıcıoğlu |

| 22 November 2020 9 | Fenerbahçe Beko | 70–56 | Bahçeşehir Koleji | Istanbul |
| 15:15 | Scoring by quarter: 13–13, 13–12, 26–18, 18–13 |
| | Pts: Dixon 26; Rebs: three players 6 Asts: three players 3 PIR: Dixon 28 | Boxscore | Pts: Jones 15; Rebs: Yıldızlı 8 Asts: Öncel 3 PIR: Yılmaz 15 | Arena: Ülker Sports and Event Hall; Attendance: 0 Referees: Zafer Yılmaz, Mehmet Serdar Ünal, Sinem Tetik |

| 1 December 2020 10 | Büyükçekmece Basketbol | 93–91(OT) | Fenerbahçe Beko | Istanbul |
| 15:15 | Scoring by quarter: 28–29, 19–20, 23–18, 12–15, Overtime: 11–9 |
| | Pts: Anderson 25; Rebs: Oliver 10; Asts: Farrell 7 PIR: Farrell 23 | Boxscore | Pts: Brown 21; Rebs: Dixon 8 Asts: Dixon, Pierre 6 PIR: Veselý 24 | Arena: Gazanfer Bilge Sports Hall; Attendance: 0 Referees: Mehmet Keseratar, Osman Sinan İşgüder, Ahmet Tatlıcı |

| 6 December 2020 11 | Fenerbahçe Beko | 94–74 | HDI Sigorta Afyon Belediye | Istanbul |
| 13:00 | Scoring by quarter: 23–13, 24–20, 26–17, 21–24 |
| | Pts: Brown, Veselý 18; Rebs: Düverioğlu 6 Asts: Westermann, Pierre 5 PIR: Brown, Veselý 21 | Boxscore | Pts: Cruz 21; Rebs: Kairys 6 Asts: Macura 5 PIR: Cruz 15 | Arena: Ülker Sports and Event Hall; Attendance: 0 Referees: Aytuğ Ekti, Semih Vural, Ali Köseoğlu |

| 12 December 2020 12 | Pınar Karşıyaka | 83–79 | Fenerbahçe Beko | İzmir |
| 17:30 | Scoring by quarter: 15–18, 14–26, 19–18, 35–17 |
| | Pts: M'Baye 27; Rebs: Morgan 8 Asts: Taylor 5 PIR: M'Baye 22 | Boxscore | Pts: Brown 19; Rebs: Düverioğlu 8 Asts: Brown, de Colo 5 PIR: Brown 21 | Arena: Karşıyaka Arena; Attendance: 0 Referees: Serkan Emlek, Kerem Baki, Alper Özgök |

| 20 December 2020 13 | Fenerbahçe Beko | 90–54 | Frutti Extra Bursaspor | Istanbul |
| 13:00 | Scoring by quarter: 26–12, 27–16, 22–11, 15–15 |
| | Pts: Düverioğlu 23; Rebs: Düverioğlu 8 Asts: de Colo 7 PIR: Düverioğlu 32 | Boxscore | Pts: Kadji 23; Rebs: Jones 6 Asts: Peters, Newman 3 PIR: Kadji 21 | Arena: Ülker Sports and Event Hall; Attendance: 0 Referees: Mehmet Keseratar, Can Mavisu, Hüseyin Çelik |

| 26 December 2020 14 | Anadolu Efes | 85–72 | Fenerbahçe Beko | Istanbul |
| 15:15 | Scoring by quarter: 18–14, 26–23, 22–20, 19–15 |
| | Pts: Moerman 25; Rebs: Moerman 15; Asts: Micić, Simon 6 PIR: Moerman 38 | Boxscore | Pts: Pierre 16; Rebs: Barthel 10; Asts: de Colo 6 PIR: Veselý, Pierre 19 | Arena: Sinan Erdem Dome; Attendance: 0 Referees: Emin Moğulkoç, Sinan İşgüder, Polat Parlak |

| 2 January 2021 15 | Galatasaray | 73–87 | Fenerbahçe Beko | Istanbul |
| 15:15 | Scoring by quarter: 20–22, 11–26, 20–20, 22–19 |
| | Pts: Hunter, Motum 15; Rebs: Marei 5 Asts: Macon 7 PIR: Motum 17 | Boxscore | Pts: Gudurić 18; Rebs: Barthel, Düverioğlu 7 Asts: Brown 8 PIR: Brown, Pierre 20 | Arena: Sinan Erdem Dome; Attendance: 0 Referees: Özlem Yalman, Ziya Özorhon, Halil Baldemir |

| 9 January 2021 16 | OGM Ormanspor | 63–72 | Fenerbahçe Beko | Ankara |
| 15:15 | Scoring by quarter: 21–21, 13–17, 15–16, 14–18 |
| | Pts: Kidd 17; Rebs: Kidd 11; Asts: Holloway 8 PIR: Kidd 21 | Boxscore | Pts: de Colo 14; Rebs: Barthel 9 Asts: de Colo 6 PIR: Düverioğlu 18 | Arena: Ankara Arena; Attendance: 0 Referees: Ali Şakacı, Semih Vural, Ali Köseoğlu |

| 17 January 2021 17 | Fenerbahçe Beko | 83–92 | Beşiktaş | Istanbul |
| 13:00 | Scoring by quarter: 27–19, 19–20, 19–27, 18–26 |
| | Pts: Mahmutoğlu; Rebs: Düverioğlu 8 Asts: Brown, Ulanovas 3 PIR: Pierre 17 | Boxscore | Pts: J.Blackmon 32; Rebs: Şengün 8 Asts: Berry 6 PIR: J.Blackmon 32 | Arena: Ülker Sports and Event Hall; Attendance: 0 Referees: Erşan Kartal, Alper Altuğ Köselerli, Musa Kazım Çetin |

| 24 January 2021 18 | Fethiye Belediyespor | 86–93 | Fenerbahçe Beko | Muğla |
| 17:30 | Scoring by quarter: 19–26, 26–31, 14–22, 27–14 |
| | Pts: Johnson 20; Rebs: Atkins 9 Asts: Frazier 10; PIR: Atkins 25 | Boxscore | Pts: Eddie 21; Rebs: Düverioğlu 10; Asts: Pérez 7 PIR: Eddie 23 | Arena: Beşkaza Spor Salonu; Attendance: 0 Referees: Aytuğ Ekti, Ahmet Tatlıcı, Polat Parlak |

| 31 January 2021 19 | Fenerbahçe Beko | 97–102(OT) | Gaziantep Basketbol | Istanbul |
| 13:00 | Scoring by quarter: 20–28, 17–24, 24–15, 25–19, Overtime: 11–16 |
| | Pts: Muhammed 22; Rebs: Eddie 5 Asts: Düverioğlu, Pérez 4 PIR: Muhammed, Pierre 19 | Boxscore | Pts: Simpson 22; Rebs: Jaiteh 12; Asts: Three players 6 PIR: Jaiteh 23 | Arena: Ülker Sports and Event Hall; Attendance: 0 Referees: Zafer Yılmaz, Mehmet Şahin, Duhan Köyiçi |

| 7 February 2021 20 | Petkim Spor | 67–80 | Fenerbahçe Beko | İzmir |
| 13:00 | Scoring by quarter: 15–24, 25–19, 12–16, 15–21 |
| | Pts: Three players 12; Rebs: Zack 7 Asts: Engindeniz, Vasiliauskas 3 PIR: Karaman, Wimbush 12 | Boxscore | Pts: Pérez 16; Rebs: Barthel 7 Asts: Brown, Pérez 5 PIR: Pérez 21 | Arena: Enka Sport Hall; Attendance: 0 Referees: Emin Moğulkoç, Yener Yılmaz, Ayşe Nur Yazıcıoğlu |

| 10 February 2021 21 | Fenerbahçe Beko | 81–84 | Tofaş | Istanbul |
| 19:30 | Scoring by quarter: 19–20, 22–19, 22–15, 18–30 |
| | Pts: de Colo 24; Rebs: Veselý 7 Asts: Barthel, Muhammed 5 PIR: de Colo, Pierre 16 | Boxscore | Pts: Akoon-Purcell 20; Rebs: Akoon-Purcell 7 Asts: Phillip 8 PIR: Akoon-Purcell, Christon 20 | Arena: Ülker Sports and Event Hall; Attendance: 0 Referees: Mehmet Keserater, Serdar Ünal, Serhat Büker |

| 28 February 2021 22 | Darüşşafaka Tekfen | 64–66 | Fenerbahçe Beko | Istanbul |
| 20:00 | Scoring by quarter: 19–14, 10–25, 12–15, 23–12 |
| | Pts: Demir 15; Rebs: Luther 5 Asts: Magette 5 PIR: Demir 16 | Boxscore | Pts: Biberovic 11; Rebs: O'Quinn 7 Asts: Gudurić, Pierre 4 PIR: O'Quinn 17 | Arena: Ayhan Şahenk Sports Hall; Attendance: 0 Referees: Erşan Kartal, Ali Şakacı, Ali Köseoğlu |

| 7 March 2021 23 | Fenerbahçe Beko | 99–77 | Türk Telekom | Istanbul |
| 20:00 | Scoring by quarter: 27–18, 26–24, 28–17, 18–18 |
| | Pts: Sipahi 21; Rebs: three players 4 Asts: Brown 12; PIR: Brown 26 | Boxscore | Pts: Wiltjer 24; Rebs: Johnson 5 Asts: Johnson 4 PIR: Wiltjer 22 | Arena: Ülker Sports and Event Hall; Attendance: 0 Referees: Aytuğ Ekti, Alper Köselerli, Özge Şentürk |

| 14 March 2021 24 | Bahçeşehir Koleji | 61–78 | Fenerbahçe Beko | Istanbul |
| 20:00 | Scoring by quarter: 18–18, 7–19, 23–24, 13–17 |
| | Pts: Green 16; Rebs: Štimac 7 Asts: Yılmaz 6 PIR: Yılmaz 19 | Boxscore | Pts: de Colo 24; Rebs: O'Quinn 9 Asts: de Colo 6 PIR: de Colo 26 | Arena: Akatlar Arena; Attendance: 0 Referees: Yener Yılmaz, Can Mavisu, Orhan Çağrı Hekimoğlu |

| 21 March 2021 25 | Fenerbahçe Beko | 81–70 | Büyükçekmece Basketbol | Istanbul |
| 13:00 | Scoring by quarter: 23–20, 18–19, 23–15, 17–16 |
| | Pts: O'Quinn 25; Rebs: O'Quinn 15; Asts: Sipahi 10; PIR: O'Quinn 38 | Boxscore | Pts: Farrell 20; Rebs: Celep, Olaseni 8 Asts: Farrell 5 PIR: Farrell 19 | Arena: Ülker Sports and Event Hall; Attendance: 0 Referees: Osman Sinan İşgüder, Kaan Büyükçil, Mehmet Ozan Çakar |

| 28 March 2021 26 | HDI Sigorta Afyon Belediye | 87–97 | Fenerbahçe Beko | Afyonkarahisar |
| 17:30 | Scoring by quarter: 27–28, 12–28, 19–21, 29–20 |
| | Pts: Cruz 23; Rebs: Leissner 7 Asts: Cruz 8 PIR: Cruz, Kairys 24 | Boxscore | Pts: Brown 20; Rebs: O'Quinn 9 Asts: Sipahi 5 PIR: Düverioğlu 15 | Arena: Prof. Dr. Veysel Eroğlu Spor Salonu; Attendance: 0 Referees: Mehmet Karabilecen, Halil Baldemir, Hüseyin Çelik |

| 4 April 2021 27 | Fenerbahçe Beko | 117–59 | Pınar Karşıyaka | Istanbul |
| 17:30 | Scoring by quarter: 29–10, 34–19, 25–20, 29–10 |
| | Pts: Candan 25; Rebs: Düverioğlu 17; Asts: Biberovic 8 PIR: Biberovic 37 | Boxscore | Pts: Tülüoğlu 22; Rebs: Agva 13; Asts: Tülüoğlu 8 PIR: Agva 21 | Arena: Ülker Sports and Event Hall; Attendance: 0 Referees: Mehmet Keserater, Aytuğ Ekti, Musa Kazım Çetin |

| 11 April 2021 28 | Frutti Extra Bursaspor | 82–77 | Fenerbahçe Beko | Bursa |
| 13:00 | Scoring by quarter: 20–15, 20–19, 20–28, 22–15 |
| | Pts: Savaş 20; Rebs: Türen 8 Asts: Peters 12; PIR: Savaş 26 | Boxscore | Pts: Mahmutoğlu 12; Rebs: three players 5 Asts: Pérez 7 PIR: Eddie 15 | Arena: Tofaş Nilüfer Spor Salonu; Attendance: 0 Referees: Yener Yılmaz, Altuğ Köselerli, Özge Şentürk |

| 16 April 2021 29 | Fenerbahçe Beko | 84–88 | Anadolu Efes | Istanbul |
| 20:00 | Scoring by quarter: 21–12, 20–23, 23–27, 20–26 |
| | Pts: Gudurić 20; Rebs: Sipahi, Veselý 4 Asts: Sipahi 5 PIR: Gudurić 18 | Boxscore | Pts: Simon 21; Rebs: Moerman 12; Asts: Simon, Tuncer 4 PIR: Moerman, Simon 25 | Arena: Ülker Sports and Event Hall; Attendance: 0 Referees: Aytuğ Ekti, Osman Sinan İşgüder, Hüseyin Çelik |

| 4 May 2021 30 | Fenerbahçe Beko | 104–79 | Galatasaray | Istanbul |
| 18:00 | Scoring by quarter: 26–22, 25–16, 27–21, 26–20 |
| | Pts: Eddie 29; Rebs: Veselý 7 Asts: Pierre 8 PIR: Eddie 27 | Boxscore | Pts: Jefferson 21; Rebs: Jefferson 7 Asts: Arslan 8 PIR: Jefferson 25 | Arena: Ülker Sports and Event Hall; Attendance: 0 Referees: Mehmet Keseratar, Özlem Yalman, Serhat Büker |

=== Basketball Super League Playoffs ===
==== Quarterfinals ====
Win Loss

| 13 May 2021 1 | Fenerbahçe Beko | 103–91(OT) | Darüşşafaka Tekfen | Istanbul |
| 20:15 | Scoring by quarter: 19–15, 23–26, 23–14, 20–30, Overtime: 18–6 |
| | Pts: de Colo 31; Rebs: Pierre 9 Asts: de Colo 10; PIR: de Colo 38 | Boxscore | Pts: Andrews, Gulley 22; Rebs: Luther 7 Asts: Andrews 5 PIR: Andrews 24 | Arena: Ülker Sports and Event Hall; Attendance: 0 Referees: Yener Yılmaz, Kaan Büyükçil, Ayşe Nur Yazıcıoğlu |

| 15 May 2021 2 | Darüşşafaka Tekfen | 79–98 | Fenerbahçe Beko | Istanbul |
| 18:15 | Scoring by quarter: 20–26, 26–27, 24–23, 9–22 |
| | Pts: Gulley 19; Rebs: Jerrett, Magette 5 Asts: Magette 4 PIR: Özdemiroğlu 17 | Boxscore | Pts: Mahmutoğlu 29; Rebs: Veselý 7 Asts: Veselý 6 PIR: Mahmutoğlu 27 | Arena: Ayhan Şahenk Sports Hall; Attendance: 0 Referees: Mehmet Karabilecen, Mehmet Şahin, Polat Parlak |

==== Semifinals ====
Win Loss

| 20 May 2021 1 | Fenerbahçe Beko | 83–79 | Pınar Karşıyaka | Istanbul |
| 19:30 | Scoring by quarter: 28–22, 23–20, 16–15, 16–22 |
| | Pts: de Colo 22; Rebs: four players 4 Asts: de Colo 7 PIR: Barthel 22 | Boxscore | Pts: Taylor 20; Rebs: Kennedy, Morgan 7 Asts: Henry 3 PIR: Taylor 19 | Arena: Ülker Sports and Event Hall; Attendance: 0 Referees: Aytuğ Ekti, Altuğ Köselerli, Serhat Büker |

| 22 May 2021 2 | Fenerbahçe Beko | 71–80 | Pınar Karşıyaka | Istanbul |
| 15:00 | Scoring by quarter: 20–23, 17–18, 22–23, 12–16 |
| | Pts: Barthel 15; Rebs: O'Quinn 8 Asts: Pérez 3 PIR: Barthel 21 | Boxscore | Pts: Morgan 21; Rebs: Morgan 10; Asts: Henry 5 PIR: Morgan 31 | Arena: Ülker Sports and Event Hall; Attendance: 0 Referees: Mehmet Keseratar, Mehmet Karabilecen, Musa Kazım Çetin |

| 24 May 2021 3 | Pınar Karşıyaka | 62–67 | Fenerbahçe Beko | İzmir |
| 19:30 | Scoring by quarter: 18–14, 11–9, 13–24, 20–20 |
| | Pts: Morgan 15; Rebs: Birsen 7 Asts: three players 2 PIR: Morgan 17 | Boxscore | Pts: Mahmutoğlu 18; Rebs: Veselý 6 Asts: de Colo, Veselý 5 PIR: Mahmutoğlu, Veselý 19 | Arena: Karşıyaka Arena; Attendance: 0 Referees: Emin Moğulkoç, Osman Sinan İşgüder, Ziya Özorhon |

| 26 May 2021 4 | Pınar Karşıyaka | 76–78 | Fenerbahçe Beko | İzmir |
| 19:30 | Scoring by quarter: 20–18, 12–21, 21–22, 23–17 |
| | Pts: Henry 19; Rebs: Morgan 7 Asts: Taylor 5 PIR: Henry 19 | Boxscore | Pts: Mahmutoğlu 21; Rebs: Barthel 8 Asts: O'Quinn 5 PIR: Mahmutoğlu 22 | Arena: Karşıyaka Arena; Attendance: 0 Referees: Yener Yılmaz, Zafer Yılmaz, Ali Şakacı |

==== Finals ====
Win Loss

| 3 June 2021 1 | Anadolu Efes | 111–71 | Fenerbahçe Beko | Istanbul |
| 17:00 | Scoring by quarter: 21–21, 22–19, 37–11, 31–20 |
| | Pts: Larkin 23; Rebs: Moerman 9 Asts: Tuncer 8 PIR: Larkin 25 | Boxscore | Pts: Mahmutoğlu 19; Rebs: Veselý 6 Asts: de Colo 6 PIR: Veselý 19 | Arena: Sinan Erdem Dome; Attendance: 0 Referees: Mehmet Keseratar, Fatih Arslanoğlu, Mehmet Serdar Ünal |

| 5 June 2021 2 | Anadolu Efes | 95–73 | Fenerbahçe Beko | Istanbul |
| 19:30 | Scoring by quarter: 23–19, 18–18, 23–19, 31–17 |
| | Pts: Beaubois 27; Rebs: Micić 7 Asts: Micić 7 PIR: Micić 25 | Boxscore | Pts: de Colo 14; Rebs: Barthel, de Colo 6 Asts: de Colo 6 PIR: de Colo 23 | Arena: Sinan Erdem Dome; Attendance: 0 Referees: Zafer Yılmaz, Osman Sinan İşgüder, Can Mavisu |

| 7 June 2021 3 | Fenerbahçe Beko | 66–93 | Anadolu Efes | Istanbul |
| 19:30 | Scoring by quarter: 25–21, 7–23, 15–28, 19–21 |
| | Pts: de Colo 19; Rebs: Veselý 4 Asts: Veselý 6 PIR: Pérez 15 | Boxscore | Pts: Beaubois 30; Rebs: Singleton 7 Asts: Micić 8 PIR: Beaubois 28 | Arena: Ülker Sports and Event Hall; Attendance: 0 Referees: Emin Moğulkoç, Yener Yılmaz, Mehmet Karabilecen |

=== EuroLeague ===
==== League table ====
| Pos | Team | Pld | W | L | PF | PA | PD | Qualification |
|---|---|---|---|---|---|---|---|---|
| 5 | (Germany) Bayern Munich | 34 | 21 | 13 | 2633 | 2599 | +34 | Qualification to playoffs |
| 6 | (Spain) Real Madrid | 34 | 20 | 14 | 2667 | 2593 | +74 | Qualification to playoffs |
| 7 | (Turkey) Fenerbahçe Beko | 34 | 20 | 14 | 2661 | 2679 | −18 | Qualification to playoffs |
| 8 | (Russia) Zenit Saint Petersburg | 34 | 20 | 14 | 2670 | 2547 | +123 | Qualification to playoffs |
| 9 | (Spain) Valencia Basket | 34 | 19 | 15 | 2762 | 2743 | +19 | |

Source: EuroLeague
Rules for classification: All points scored in extra period(s) will not be counted in the standings, nor for any tie-break situation.

==== Results summary ====
| Overall | | | | | | Home | | | | | Away | | | | |
| Pld | W | L | PF | PA | PD | W | L | PF | PA | PD | W | L | PF | PA | PD |
|---|---|---|---|---|---|---|---|---|---|---|---|---|---|---|---|
| 34 | 20 | 14 | 2661 | 2679 | −18 | 10 | 7 | 1379 | 1318 | +61 | 10 | 7 | 1282 | 1361 | −79 |

Source: EuroLeague

==== Results by round ====
| Round | 1 | 2 | 3 | 4 | 5 | 6 | 7 | 8 | 9 | 10 | 11 | 12 | 13 | 14 | 15 | 16 | 17 | 18 | 19 | 20 | 21 | 22 | 23 | 24 | 25 | 26 | 27 | 28 | 29 | 30 | 31 | 32 | 33 | 34 |
|---|---|---|---|---|---|---|---|---|---|---|---|---|---|---|---|---|---|---|---|---|---|---|---|---|---|---|---|---|---|---|---|---|---|---|
| Ground | H | A | H | H | A | A | H | A | A | A | H | A | A | H | A | H | H | A | H | H | A | H | A | H | H | H | A | A | A | H | A | A | H | H |
| Result | W | W | L | L | L | W | W | L | L | L | L | W | L | L | L | W | W | W | W | W | W | W | W | W | W | L | W | W | L | W | W | W | L | L |
| Position | 1 | 1 | 3 | 9 | 11 | 6 | 5 | 9 | 10 | 13 | 13 | 12 | 14 | 14 | 17 | 14 | 13 | 13 | 11 | 11 | 11 | 9 | 8 | 8 | 7 | 8 | 8 | 7 | 7 | 6 | 6 | 5 | 5 | 7 |

Source: EuroLeague.net
A = Away; H = Home; W = Win; L = Loss

==== Matches ====
| 2 October 2020 1 | Fenerbahçe Beko (Turkey) | 77–63 | (Serbia) Crvena zvezda mts | Istanbul |
| 19:45 | Scoring by quarter: 24–20, 18–10, 15–11, 20–22 |
| | Pts: Brown 17; Rebs: Veselý 8 Asts: de Colo 7 PIR: de Colo 16 | Boxscore | Pts: Loyd 15; Rebs: Kuzmić 7 Asts: Loyd 4 PIR: Kuzmić 12 | Arena: Ülker Sports and Event Hall; Attendance: 0 Referees: Luigi Lamonica, Oļegs Latiševs, Milan Nedović |

| 8 October 2020 2 | Anadolu Efes (Turkey) | 71–80 | (Turkey) Fenerbahçe Beko | Istanbul |
| 19:30 | Scoring by quarter: 23–16, 12–26, 19–19, 17–19 |
| | Pts: Simon 24; Rebs: Moerman, Pleiß 6 Asts: Balbay, Simon 5 PIR: Simon 34 | Boxscore | Pts: De Colo 20; Rebs: Veselý 10; Asts: De Colo 4 PIR: De Colo 28 | Arena: Sinan Erdem Dome; Attendance: 0 Referees: Borys Ryzhyk, Juan Carlos García, Saša Pukl |

| 14 October 2020 3 | Fenerbahçe Beko (Turkey) | 77–78(OT) | (Russia) CSKA Moscow | Istanbul |
| 19:45 | Scoring by quarter: 10–12, 21–20, 20–17, 18–20, Overtime: 8–9 |
| | Pts: de Colo 21; Rebs: Veseleý 7 Asts: Brown 8 PIR: Eddie 21 | Boxscore | Pts: Clyburn 26; Rebs: Shengelia 8 Asts: James 6 PIR: Clyburn 27 | Arena: Ülker Sports and Event Hall; Attendance: 0 Referees: Robert Lottermoser, Daniel Hierrezuelo, Miloš Koljenšić |

| 16 October 2020 4 | Fenerbahçe Beko (Turkey) | 71–75 | (Germany) Bayern Munich | Istanbul |
| 19:45 | Scoring by quarter: 28–9, 17–16, 13–23, 13–27 |
| | Pts: Veselý 25; Rebs: Veselý 8 Asts: de Colo 7 PIR: Veselý 33 | Boxscore | Pts: Lučić 18; Rebs: Reynolds 8 Asts: Šiško 4 PIR: Lučić 24 | Arena: Ülker Sports and Event Hall; Attendance: 0 Referees: Ilija Belošević, Sašo Petek, Vasiliki Tsaroucha |

| 22 October 2020 5 | Panathinaikos OPAP (Greece) | 82–68 | (Turkey) Fenerbahçe Beko | Athens |
| 20:00 | Scoring by quarter: 22–13, 15–17, 25–26, 20–12 |
| | Pts: Nedović 28; Rebs: Papagiannis 7 Asts: Sykes 5 PIR: Nedović 28 | Boxscore | Pts: Brown 17; Rebs: Barthel 5 Asts: Brown 6 PIR: Brown 22 | Arena: O.A.K.A. Attendance: 0 Referees: Borys Ryzhyk, Carlos Peruga, Amit Balak |

| 29 October 2020 6 | Maccabi Tel Aviv (Israel) | 65–75 | (Turkey) Fenerbahçe Beko | Tel Aviv |
| 20:05 | Scoring by quarter: 22–18, 16–17, 16–21, 11–19 |
| | Pts: Wilbekin 23; Rebs: Žižić 10; Asts: Bryant 4 PIR: Wilbekin 18 | Boxscore | Pts: Muhammed 17; Rebs: three players 4 Asts: Veselý 4 PIR: Muhammed, Veselý 15 | Arena: Menora Mivtachim Arena; Attendance: 0 Referees: Ilija Belošević, Carmelo Paternicò, Mehdi Diffalah |

| 6 November 2020 7 | Fenerbahçe Beko (Turkey) | 83–71 | (Russia) Khimki | Istanbul |
| 18:45 | Scoring by quarter: 23–20, 19–15, 23–20, 18–16 |
| | Pts: Pierre, Eddie 16; Rebs: Veselý 11; Asts: Brown 8 PIR: Brown 20 | Boxscore | Pts: Mickey 19; Rebs: Monroe 8 Asts: Shved 9 PIR: Mickey 21 | Arena: Ülker Sports and Event Hall; Attendance: 0 Referees: Juan Carlos Garcia, Saso Petek, Uros Nikolic |

| 12 November 2020 8 | Barcelona (Spain) | 97–55 | (Turkey) Fenerbahçe Beko | Barcelona |
| 21:00 | Scoring by quarter: 28–17, 23–12, 18–9, 28–17 |
| | Pts: Kuric 25; Rebs: Mirotić 8 Asts: Heurtel, Calathes 8 PIR: Šmits, Mirotić 23 | Boxscore | Pts: Brown 10; Rebs: Düverioğlu 4 Asts: Westermann 5 PIR: Brown 10 | Arena: Palau Blaugrana; Attendance: 0 Referees: Borys Ryzhyk, Oļegs Latiševs, Tomislav Hordov |

| 17 November 2020 9 | Kirolbet Baskonia (Spain) | 86–68 | (Turkey) Fenerbahçe Beko | Vitoria-Gasteiz |
| 21:00 | Scoring by quarter: 20–21, 25–15, 19–23, 22–9 |
| | Pts: Peters 25; Rebs: Jekiri 8 Asts: Henry 10; PIR: Peters 31 | Boxscore | Pts: Veselý 15; Rebs: Brown, Eddie 4 Asts: Brown 5 PIR: Veselý 18 | Arena: Buesa Arena; Attendance: 0 Referees: Luigi Lamonica, Mehdi Difallah, Gytis Vilius |

| 20 November 2020 10 | Real Madrid (Spain) | 94–74 | (Turkey) Fenerbahçe Beko | Madrid |
| 21:00 | Scoring by quarter: 28–12, 21–24, 23–15, 22–23 |
| | Pts: Abalde 17; Rebs: Tavares 6 Asts: Campazzo 12; PIR: Abalde 22 | Boxscore | Pts: Barthel 22; Rebs: Brown 6 Asts: Brown 5 PIR: Barthel 23 | Arena: WiZink Center; Attendance: 0 Referees: Matej Boltauzer, Fernando Rocha, Joseph Bissang |

| 27 November 2020 11 | Fenerbahçe Beko (Turkey) | 86–90 | (Spain) Valencia Basket | Istanbul |
| 18:45 | Scoring by quarter: 17–16, 26-17, 21–26, 22–31 |
| | Pts: Pierre 18; Rebs: Barthel 6 Asts: Brown, Muhammed 5 PIR: Pierre 25 | Boxscore | Pts: Van Rossom 20; Rebs: Dubljević 8 Asts: Van Rossom 5 PIR: Van Rossom 24 | Arena: Ülker Sports and Event Hall; Attendance: 0 Referees: Saša Pukl, Elias Koromilas, Piotr Pastusiak |

| 3 December 2020 12 | Zenit Saint Petersburg (Russia) | 65–73 | (Turkey) Fenerbahçe Beko | Saint Petersburg |
| 18:00 | Scoring by quarter: 14–23, 18–22, 21–8, 12–20 |
| | Pts: Pangos 16; Rebs: Ponitka 8 Asts: Pangos 4 PIR: Pangos 22 | Boxscore | Pts: Veselý 17; Rebs: Barthel 5 Asts: Brown 5 PIR: Barthel 24 | Arena: Sibur Arena; Attendance: 1317; Referees: Carmelo Paternicò, Joseph Bissang, Uroš Nikolić |

| 10 December 2020 13 | ALBA Berlin (Germany) | 89–63 | (Turkey) Fenerbahçe Beko | Berlin |
| 20:00 | Scoring by quarter: 23–16, 21–11, 26–14, 19–22 |
| | Pts: Giffey 13; Rebs: Sikma 8 Asts: Giffey 8 PIR: Giffey 20 | Boxscore | Pts: Biberovic 13; Rebs: Hamilton 5 Asts: Westermann 4 PIR: Westermann 12 | Arena: Mercedes-Benz Arena; Attendance: 0 Referees: Juan Carlos García, Sašo Petek, Seffi Shemmesh |

| 15 December 2020 14 | Fenerbahçe Beko (Turkey) | 71–79 | (Italy) A|X Armani Exchange Milan | Istanbul |
| 18:45 | Scoring by quarter: 25–26, 10–18, 13–24, 23–11 |
| | Pts: Pierre 16; Rebs: Düverioğlu 6 Asts: Westermann 4 PIR: Pierre 20 | Boxscore | Pts: LeDay 15; Rebs: LeDay 7 Asts: Rodríguez, Delaney 4 PIR: LeDay 20 | Arena: Ülker Sports and Event Hall; Attendance: 0 Referees: Daniel Hierrezuelo, Fernando Rocha, Mario Majkić |

| 17 December 2020 15 | Žalgiris (Lithuania) | 99–62 | (Turkey) Fenerbahçe Beko | Kaunas |
| 19:00 | Scoring by quarter: 24–7, 27–24, 30–16, 18–15 |
| | Pts: Rubit 18; Rebs: Hayes 7 Asts: Grigonis 7 PIR: Rubit 27 | Boxscore | Pts: de Colo 14; Rebs: de Colo 6 Asts: de Colo 3 PIR: de Colo 20 | Arena: Žalgirio Arena; Attendance: 0 Referees: Saša Pukl, Carmelo Paternicò, Emilio Pérez |

| 23 December 2020 16 | Fenerbahçe Beko (Turkey) | 84–77 | (Greece) Olympiacos | Istanbul |
| 18:45 | Scoring by quarter: 22–27, 23–14, 21–13, 18–23 |
| | Pts: Veselý 17; Rebs: de Colo 8 Asts: de Colo, Veselý 5 PIR: Veselý 29 | Boxscore | Pts: Vezenkov 17; Rebs: Jean-Charles 6 Asts: Sloukas 7 PIR: Vezenkov 21 | Arena: Ülker Sports and Event Hall; Attendance: 0 Referees: Juan Carlos García, Piotr Pastusiak, Uroš Nikolić |

| 30 December 2020 17 | Fenerbahçe Beko (Turkey) | 81–59 | (France) LDLC ASVEL | Istanbul |
| 18:45 | Scoring by quarter: 15–19, 23–13, 21–10, 22–17 |
| | Pts: Gudurić, Veselý 16; Rebs: Brown 7 Asts: three players 4 PIR: Gudurić 15 | Boxscore | Pts: Lighty 11; Rebs: Hayes 6 Asts: Kahudi 4 PIR: four players 8 | Arena: Ülker Sports and Event Hall; Attendance: 0 Referees: Ilija Belošević, Tomislav Hordov, Carlos Peruga |

| 7 January 2021 18 | Crvena zvezda mts (Serbia) | 71–73 | (Turkey) Fenerbahçe Beko | Belgrade |
| 19:00 | Scoring by quarter: 22–18, 17–20, 14–15, 18–20 |
| | Pts: O'Bryant 17; Rebs: O'Bryant 10; Asts: Colom 5 PIR: O'Bryant 30 | Boxscore | Pts: Brown, Pierre 13; Rebs: Gudurić 8 Asts: Brown 4 PIR: Pierre 19 | Arena: Štark Arena; Attendance: 0 Referees: Christos Christodoulou, Fernando Rocha, Robert Vyklický |

| 12 January 2021 19 | Fenerbahçe Beko (Turkey) | 96–76 | (Spain) Kirolbet Baskonia | Istanbul |
| 18:45 | Scoring by quarter: 28–18, 23–23, 24–15, 21–20 |
| | Pts: de Colo 27; Rebs: Gudurić, Düverioğlu 7 Asts: Gudurić 6 PIR: de Colo 30 | Boxscore | Pts: Peters 15; Rebs: Peters 5 Asts: Vildoza, Polonara 5 PIR: Polonara 18 | Arena: Ülker Sports and Event Hall; Attendance: 0 Referees: Damir Javor, Milivoje Jovčić, Anne Panther |

| 15 January 2021 20 | Fenerbahçe Beko (Turkey) | 100–74 | (Greece) Panathinaikos OPAP | Istanbul |
| 18:45 | Scoring by quarter: 31–12, 17–22, 26–21, 26–19 |
| | Pts: Gudurić 18; Rebs: Veselý 7 Asts: Brown, de Colo 5 PIR: Gudurić 20 | Boxscore | Pts: White 13; Rebs: Mitoglou 7 Asts: Nedović 6 PIR: White 16 | Arena: Ülker Sports and Event Hall; Attendance: 0 Referees: Luigi Lamonica, Emilio Perez, Gytis Vilius |

| 22 January 2021 21 | CSKA Moscow (Russia) | 83–89 | (Turkey) Fenerbahçe Beko | Moscow |
| 18:00 | Scoring by quarter: 21–15, 17–23, 28–25, 17–26 |
| | Pts: Shengelia 18; Rebs: Milutinov 7 Asts: Shengelia 4 PIR: Milutinov 21 | Boxscore | Pts: Veselý 24; Rebs: Veselý 6 Asts: de Colo 9 PIR: de Colo 38 | Arena: Megasport Arena; Attendance: 4277; Referees: Juan Carlos García, Mario Majkić, Hugues Thépénier |

| 26 January 2021 22 | Fenerbahçe Beko (Turkey) | 82–75 | (Israel) Maccabi Tel Aviv | Istanbul |
| 18:45 | Scoring by quarter: 17–21, 19–14, 24–18, 22–22 |
| | Pts: Veselý 18; Rebs: Veselý 6 Asts: Brown 6 PIR: Veselý 29 | Boxscore | Pts: Bryant 18; Rebs: Hunter 8 Asts: Wilbekin 10; PIR: Wilbekin 22 | Arena: Ülker Sports and Event Hall; Attendance: 0 Referees: Robert Lottermoser, Milan Nedović, Milos Koljensic |

| 28 January 2021 23 | Khimki (Russia) | 76–107 | (Turkey) Fenerbahçe Beko | Mytishchi |
| 18:00 | Scoring by quarter: 22–23, 22–30, 13–30, 19–24 |
| | Pts: Shved 29; Rebs: Valiev 6 Asts: Shved 5 PIR: Voronov 16 | Boxscore | Pts: De Colo 18; Rebs: Pierre 6 Asts: Brown 6 PIR: Veselý 27 | Arena: Mytishchi Arena; Attendance: 594; Referees: Christos Christodoulou, Carlos Cortes, Marcin Kowalski |

| 5 February 2021 24 | Fenerbahçe Beko (Turkey) | 92–84 | (Russia) Zenit Saint Petersburg | Istanbul |
| 18:45 | Scoring by quarter: 25–25, 22–18, 19–22, 26–19 |
| | Pts: De Colo 24; Rebs: Gudurić 6 Asts: De Colo 7 PIR: De Colo 28 | Boxscore | Pts: Thomas 21; Rebs: Thomas 6 Asts: Pangos 7 PIR: Thomas 26 | Arena: Ülker Sports and Event Hall; Attendance: 300; Referees: Luigi Lamonica, Borys Ryzhyk, Luka Kardum |

| 19 February 2021 25 | Fenerbahçe Beko (Turkey) | 89–84 | (Germany) ALBA Berlin | Istanbul |
| 18:45 | Scoring by quarter: 24–22, 21–20, 22–18, 22–24 |
| | Pts: De Colo 26; Rebs: Veselý 8 Asts: De Colo 8 PIR: De Colo 31 | Boxscore | Pts: Eriksson 19; Rebs: Fontecchio 8 Asts: Lô 8 PIR: Lammers 23 | Arena: Ülker Sports and Event Hall; Attendance: 100; Referees: Sreten Radović, Carmelo Paternicò, Rain Peerandi |

| 26 February 2021 26 | Fenerbahçe Beko (Turkey) | 74–106 | (Turkey) Anadolu Efes | Istanbul |
| 18:45 | Scoring by quarter: 11–24, 28–29, 19–28, 16–25 |
| | Pts: De Colo 24; Rebs: Veselý 6 Asts: De Colo 5 PIR: De Colo 28 | Boxscore | Pts: Micić 37; Rebs: Singleton 5 Asts: Simon 6 PIR: Micić 44 | Arena: Ülker Sports and Event Hall; Attendance: 250; Referees: Miguel Angel Pérez, Oļegs Latiševs, Anne Panther |

| 3 March 2021 27 | A|X Armani Exchange Milan (Italy) | 92–100 | (Turkey) Fenerbahçe Beko | Assago |
| 20:45 | Scoring by quarter: 28–24, 24–26, 17–28, 23–22 |
| | Pts: Punter 20; Rebs: Datome 6 Asts: Shields 5 PIR: Datome 21 | Boxscore | Pts: De Colo 20; Rebs: Veselý 10; Asts: Veselý 8 PIR: Veselý 35 | Arena: Mediolanum Forum; Attendance: 0 Referees: Saša Pukl, Carlos Cortes, Joseph Bissang |

| 5 March 2021 28 | LDLC ASVEL (France) | 86–90 | (Turkey) Fenerbahçe Beko | Villeurbanne |
| 20:45 | Scoring by quarter: 18–20, 20–20, 22–19, 26–31 |
| | Pts: Lighty 15; Rebs: Bako 5 Asts: Cole 4 PIR: Bako 19 | Boxscore | Pts: De Colo 24; Rebs: Three players 4 Asts: De Colo 6 PIR: De Colo 27 | Arena: Astroballe; Attendance: 0 Referees: Matej Boltauzer, Tomislav Hordov, Ingus Baumanis |

| 12 March 2021 29 | Valencia Basket (Spain) | 66–52 | (Turkey) Fenerbahçe Beko | Valencia |
| 21:00 | Scoring by quarter: 18–10, 19–18, 8–11, 21–13 |
| | Pts: Van Rossom 17; Rebs: Dubljević 7 Asts: Kalinić 5 PIR: Van Rossom 26 | Boxscore | Pts: Veselý 15; Rebs: De Colo 6 Asts: Brown, De Colo 4 PIR: Veselý 19 | Arena: La Fonteta; Attendance: 0 Referees: Luigi Lamonica, Elias Koromilas, Gytis Vilius |

| 18 March 2021 30 | Fenerbahçe Beko (Turkey) | 84–61 | (Lithuania) Žalgiris | Istanbul |
| 18:45 | Scoring by quarter: 28–18, 17–8, 21–20, 18–15 |
| | Pts: Veselý 21; Rebs: Veselý 10; Asts: De Colo 6 PIR: Veselý 32 | Boxscore | Pts: Lekavičius 12; Rebs: Jankūnas 7 Asts: Grigonis 8 PIR: Grigonis 15 | Arena: Ülker Sports and Event Hall; Attendance: 0 Referees: Miguel Angel Pérez, Milivoje Jovčić, Mario Majkić |

| 26 March 2021 31 | Olympiacos (Greece) | 71–76 | (Turkey) Fenerbahçe Beko | Piraeus |
| 20:00 | Scoring by quarter: 11–20, 16–23, 22–15, 22–18 |
| | Pts: Jean-Charles 16; Rebs: Jean-Charles 8 Asts: Sloukas 5 PIR: Jean-Charles 22 | Boxscore | Pts: Veselý 18; Rebs: De Colo 7 Asts: De Colo, Pierre 4 PIR: Veselý 23 | Arena: Peace and Friendship Stadium; Attendance: 0 Referees: Ilija Belošević, Carlos Cortes, Jurgis Laurinavičius |

| 31 March 2021 32 | Bayern Munich (Germany) | 68–77 | (Turkey) Fenerbahçe Beko | Munich |
| 20:30 | Scoring by quarter: 15–18, 19–17, 10–18, 24–24 |
| | Pts: Baldwin 20; Rebs: Baldwin, Lučić 7 Asts: Šiško 7 PIR: Baldwin 19 | Boxscore | Pts: De Colo 21; Rebs: three player 6 Asts: Veselý 5 PIR: De Colo 27 | Arena: Audi Dome; Attendance: 0 Referees: Sreten Radović, Piotr Pastusiak, Amit Balak |

| 2 April 2021 33 | Fenerbahçe Beko (Turkey) | 73–82 | (Spain) Barcelona | Istanbul |
| 19:45 | Scoring by quarter: 25–26, 17–21, 16–15, 15–20 |
| | Pts: Gudurić 19; Rebs: Barthel 6 Asts: De Colo 6 PIR: Gudurić 21 | Boxscore | Pts: Kuric 16; Rebs: Davies 9 Asts: three players 4 PIR: Kuric 18 | Arena: Ülker Sports and Event Hall; Attendance: 0 Referees: Robert LottermoserElias Koromilas, Rain Peerandi |

| 8 April 2021 34 | Fenerbahçe Beko (Turkey) | 67–93 | (Spain) Real Madrid | Istanbul |
| 19:45 | Scoring by quarter: 11-23, 25-26, 21-18, 10-26 |
| | Pts: de Colo 23; Rebs: O'Quinn, de Colo 5 Asts: O'Quinn, Pierre 2 PIR: de Colo 27 | Boxscore | Pts: Causeur 20; Rebs: Thompkins 9 Asts: Laprovíttola 10; PIR: Laprovíttola 29 | Arena: Ülker Sports and Event Hall; Attendance: 0 Referees: Luigi Lamonica, Anne Panther, Mario Majkić |

=== Euroleague Playoffs ===
==== Quarterfinals ====
Win Loss

| 21 April 2021 1 | CSKA Moscow (Russia) | 92–76 | (Turkey) Fenerbahçe Beko | Moscow |
| 19:00 | Scoring by quarter: 28–23, 25–21, 11–22, 28–10 |
| | Pts: Clyburn, Hackett 20; Rebs: Voigtmann 10; Asts: Clyburn 5 PIR: Clyburn 25 | Boxscore | Pts: De Colo 27; Rebs: O'Quinn 6 Asts: Barthel 5 PIR: De Colo 27 | Arena: Megasport Arena; Attendance: 4049; Referees: Luigi Lamonica, Olegs Latisevs, Gytis Vilius |

| 23 April 2021 2 | CSKA Moscow (Russia) | 78–67 | (Turkey) Fenerbahçe Beko | Moscow |
| 19:00 | Scoring by quarter: 23–25, 27–17, 10–13, 18–12 |
| | Pts: Hackett 14; Rebs: Shengelia 7 Asts: Hackett 9 PIR: Hackett 26 | Boxscore | Pts: Gudurić 27; Rebs: Brown 5 Asts: Gudurić 3 PIR: Gudurić 27 | Arena: Megasport Arena; Attendance: 5128; Referees: Miguel Angel Pérez, Milan Nedović, Uros Nikolic |

| 28 April 2021 3 | Fenerbahçe Beko (Turkey) | 68–85 | (Russia) CSKA Moscow | Istanbul |
| 19:45 | Scoring by quarter: 24–17, 15–27, 11–27, 18–14 |
| | Pts: de Colo 22; Rebs: Biberovic 7 Asts: de Colo, Düverioğlu 3 PIR: de Colo 19 | Boxscore | Pts: Clyburn 34; Rebs: Clyburn, Lundberg 7 Asts: Lundberg 5 PIR: Clyburn 38 | Arena: Sinan Erdem Dome; Attendance: 0 Referees: Robert Lottermoser, Saša Pukl, Tomasz Trawicki |

== Statistics ==
Legend
| GP | Games played | GS | Games started | MPG | Minutes per game |
| FG% | Field-goal percentage | 3FG% | 3-point field-goal percentage | FT% | Free-throw percentage |
| RPG | Rebounds per game | APG | Assists per game | SPG | Steals per game |
| BPG | Blocks per game | PPG | Points per game | PIR | PIR per game |

| Player | Left during season |

=== EuroLeague ===
| Player | GP | GS | MPG | 2FG% | 3FG% | FT% | RPG | APG | SPG | BPG | PPG | PIR |
|---|---|---|---|---|---|---|---|---|---|---|---|---|
| Lorenzo Brown | 37 | 12 | 22:59 | .470 | .327 | .804 | 2.2 | 3.5 | 1.3 | 0 | 9.5 | 8.6 |
| Alex Pérez | 7 | 0 | 7:37 | .500 | .000 | .000 | 0.6 | 1.4 | 0.4 | 0 | 1.1 | -0.1 |
| Marko Gudurić | 21 | 21 | 25:46 | .489 | .417 | .844 | 2.7 | 2.3 | 0.8 | 0.3 | 12.2 | 10.8 |
| Melih Mahmutoğlu | 28 | 5 | 13:40 | .564 | .328 | .857 | 0.7 | 0.3 | 0.2 | 0 | 4.1 | 1.7 |
| Kyle O'Quinn | 15 | 2 | 15:38 | .589 | .444 | .833 | 3.4 | 1.5 | 0.6 | 0.5 | 5.5 | 6.4 |
| Tarik Biberovic | 16 | 2 | 9:22 | .545 | .389 | .667 | 1.5 | 0.3 | 0.2 | 0 | 2.9 | 2.3 |
| Yiğit Onan | Not added to the roster | | | | | | | | | | | |
| Nando de Colo | 32 | 31 | 27:30 | .585 | .403 | .936 | 3.2 | 3.9 | 1.4 | 0 | 15.8 | 18.8 |
| Dyshawn Pierre | 36 | 6 | 24:10 | .614 | .417 | .880 | 3.3 | 2 | 0.5 | 0.4 | 9.1 | 11.9 |
| Danilo Barthel | 29 | 18 | 21:49 | .578 | .412 | .884 | 3.1 | 1.3 | 0.5 | 0.2 | 6.3 | 8.2 |
| Jan Veselý | 31 | 31 | 28:08 | .676 | .000 | .766 | 5.3 | 2.7 | 0.9 | 0.6 | 13.1 | 18 |
| Kenan Sipahi | 10 | 0 | 5:47 | .444 | .333 | .333 | 0.4 | 0.2 | 0.5 | 0 | 1.6 | 0.6 |
| Jarell Eddie | 32 | 0 | 16:59 | .500 | .449 | .905 | 2.1 | 0.4 | 0.3 | 0.1 | 5.9 | 4.2 |
| Berkay Candan | 2 | 0 | 1: 04 | .000 | .000 | .000 | 0 | 0 | 0 | 0 | 0 | 0 |
| Ali Muhammed | 17 | 3 | 15:01 | .464 | .442 | .800 | 1.6 | 0.4 | 0.8 | 0 | 5.8 | 5.6 |
| Ahmet Düverioğlu | 30 | 23 | 11:31 | .701 | .000 | .516 | 2.6 | 0.9 | 0.4 | 0.3 | 3.7 | 4.4 |
| Edgaras Ulanovas | 28 | 28 | 19:34 | .516 | .400 | .722 | 1.6 | 1.4 | 0.3 | 0 | 4.5 | 4.7 |
| Johnny Hamilton | 13 | 0 | 6:54 | .333 | .000 | .500 | 2 | 0.2 | 0.2 | 0.6 | 1 | 1.2 |
| Léo Westermann | 9 | 3 | 16:00 | .438 | .450 | 1.000 | 1.7 | 2.3 | 0.6 | 0 | 4.8 | 4 |

Source: EuroLeague
