= New Agenda =

New Agenda may refer to:

- New Agenda (album), a 1973 album by Elvin Jones
- Ny agenda (lit. 'New agenda'), a 2021 extended play by Artigeardit and Lamin
- "New Agenda", a song from Janet Jackson's 1993 album, Janet
- Democratic Left (Ireland), an Irish political party, formerly named New Agenda
- The New Agenda, an organization devoted to the empowerment of women, founded by Amy Siskind in 2008

== See also ==
- New Agenda Coalition, a group of countries negotiating on nuclear disarmament
