= Marblehead Public Schools =

School district in Massachusetts, USA

Coordinates: 42°29′24.10″N 70°52′48.59″W

Marblehead Public Schools is an educational district located in Marblehead, Massachusetts. The district provides educational opportunities and facilities for students from kindergarten through high school. There are eight schools, including five elementary schools, one upper elementary, one middle, and one high school.

== Schools ==
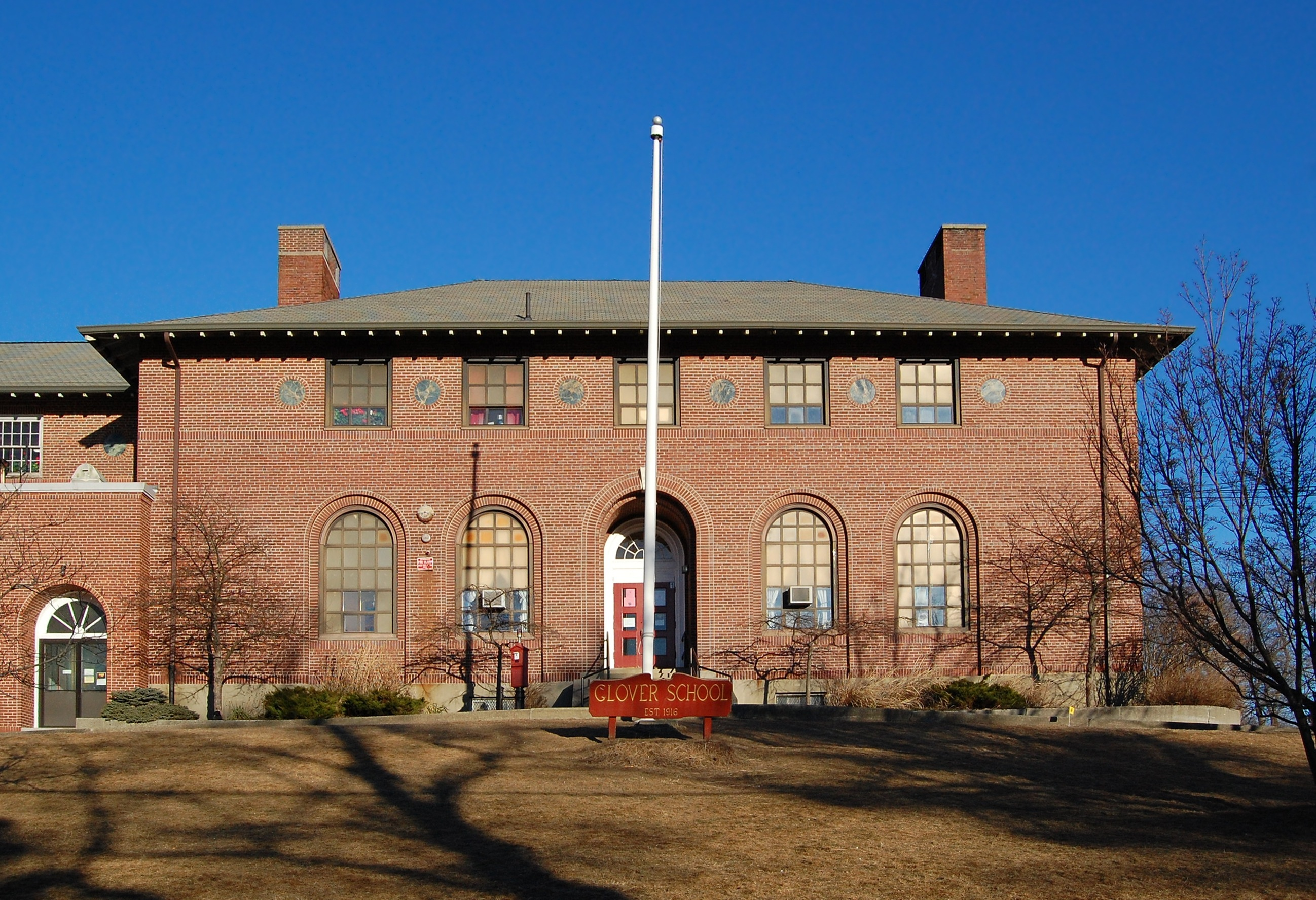
Former Glover School building on Maple Street

Elementary schools

- Brown School
- Village School
- Glover School

Middle schools

- Marblehead Veterans Middle School

High schools

- Marblehead High School

== Notable alumni ==
- Keith Ablow, former psychiatrist, pundit and talk show host.
