= Erdem Can =

Turkish basketball coach (born 1980)

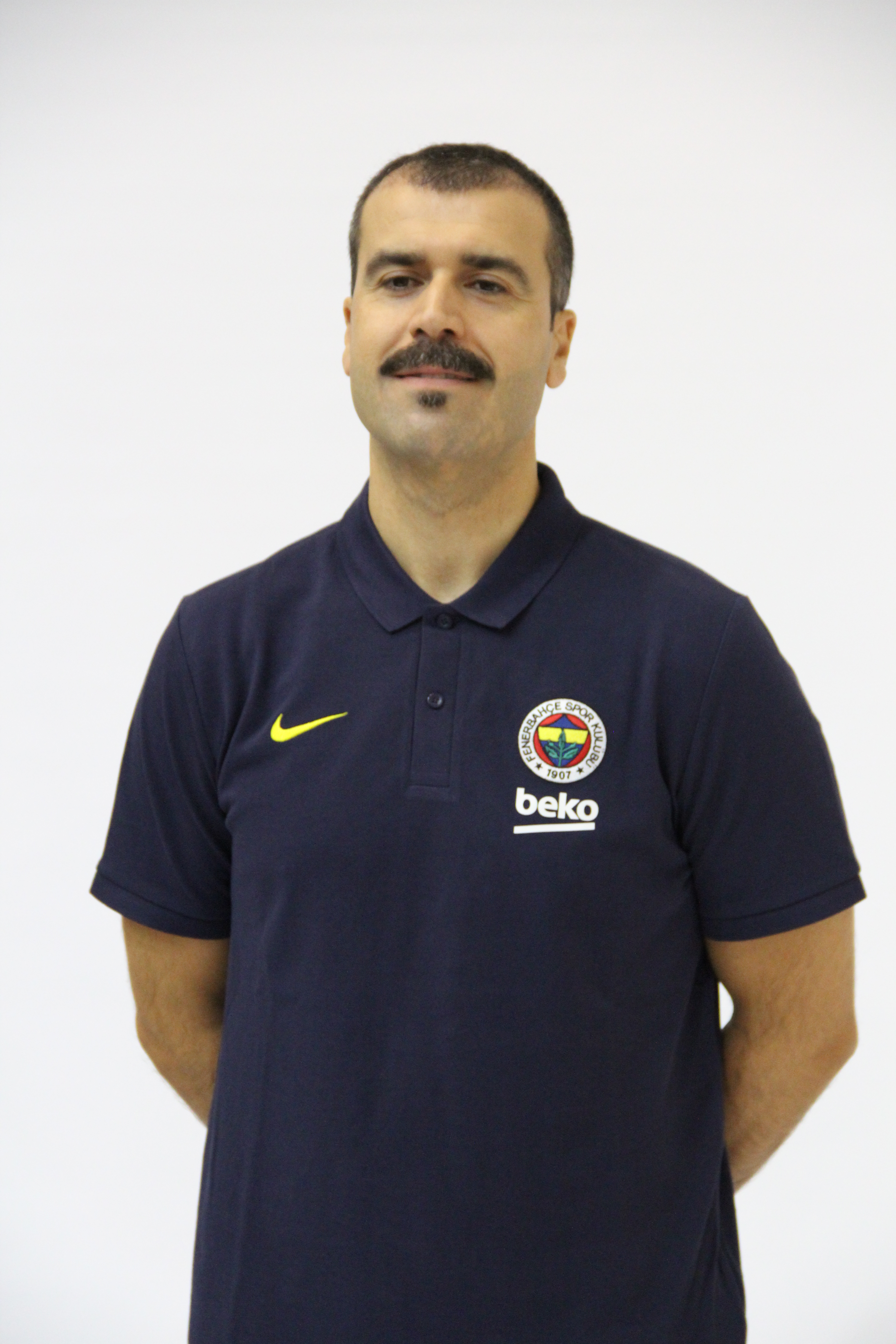
- Can with Fenerbahçe in 2019

Türk Telekom
- Position: Head coach
- League: Basketbol Süper Ligi

Personal information
- Born: 3 November 1980 (age 46) Ankara, Turkey
- Coaching career: 2008–present

Career history

Coaching
- 2008–2010: Türk Telekom (assistant)
- 2010–2012: Olin Edirne
- 2012–2021: Fenerbahçe (assistant)
- 2021–2022: Utah Jazz (assistant)
- 2022–2023: Türk Telekom
- 2023–2024: Anadolu Efes
- 2024–present: Türk Telekom

Career highlights
- As head coach: EuroCup Coach of the Year (2023); Turkish Super League Coach of the Year (2023); As assistant coach: EuroLeague champion (2017); 4× Turkish League champion (2014, 2016, 2017, 2018); 3× Turkish Cup winner (2016, 2019, 2020); 3× Turkish Supercup winner (2013, 2016, 2017)

Erdem Can (born 3 November 1980) is a Turkish professional basketball coach, who is currently the head coach for Türk Telekom of the Turkish Basketbol Süper Ligi (BSL).

== Early life ==
Can played basketball for youth system teams of Sümerbank (1993–1996) and Mülkiyespor (1996–1998).

Can earned his master's degree in political science and public administration at the Ankara University Faculty of Political Science in 2003.

== Coaching career ==
=== Fenerbahçe (2012–2021) ===
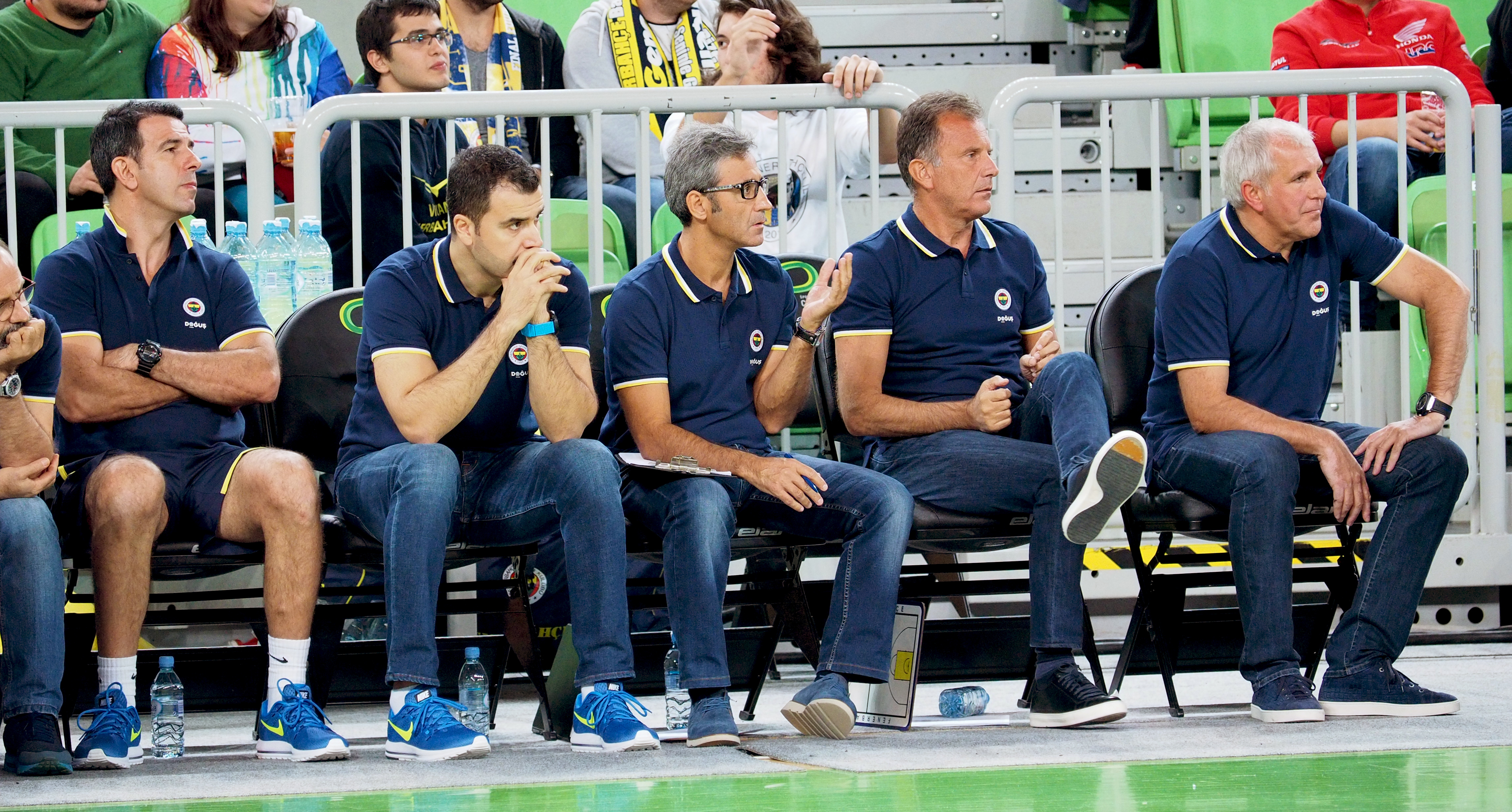
Belgutay, Can, Izquierdo, Androić, and Obradović at the Fenerbahçe's bench in September 2017.

An assistant coach, Can worked for Fenerbahçe between 2012 and 2021. Under head coach Željko Obradović, he helped the team to four Turkish League Championships, three Turkish Cups, five EuroLeague Final Fours, three EuroLeague Finals, and a EuroLeague title in the 2016–17 season. Also, he was an assistant coach during the 2020–21 Fenerbahçe season under head coach Igor Kokoškov.

Can was an assistant coach for the Turkish national team at the EuroBasket 2017.

=== Utah Jazz (2021–2022) ===
On 20 August 2021, Can was named an assistant coach for Utah Jazz under Quin Snyder. Prior to his hire, he had assisted the Utah Jazz's summer league coaching staff five times in Salt Lake City and Las Vegas.

=== Türk Telekom (2022–2023) ===
On June 10, 2022, he became the head coach for Türk Telekom of the Turkish Basketbol Süper Ligi (BSL).

=== Anadolu Efes (2023–2024) ===
In June 2023, Can replaced Ergin Ataman as the head coach of Turkish powerhouse Anadolu Efes. On February 1, 2024, he was dismissed from his position with a 9 wins-15 losses EuroLeague record.

=== Türk Telekom (2024–present) ===
On June 4, 2024, he signed with Türk Telekom of the Turkish Basketbol Süper Ligi (BSL) for a second stint.

== Career achievements ==
As assistant coach

- EuroLeague champion: 1 (with Fenerbahçe: 2016–17)
- Turkish League champion: 4 (with Fenerbahçe: 2013–14, 2015–16, 2016–17, 2017–18)
- Turkish Cup winner: 3 (with Fenerbahçe: 2016, 2019, 2020)
- Turkish Super Cup winner: 3 (with Fenerbahçe: 2013, 2016, 2017)

As head coach

- EuroCup finalist: 1 (with Türk Telekom B.K.: 2023)

== See also ==
- List of foreign NBA coaches
