= Joel Mark Noe =

American plastic surgeon

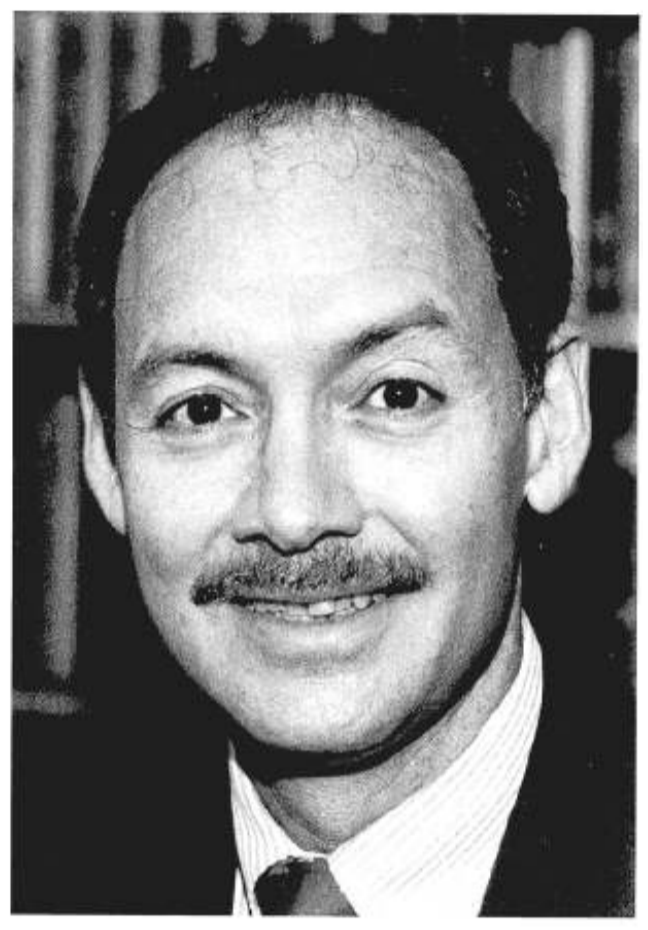
- Born: Joel Mark Noe; March 7, 1943
- Died: September 13, 1991 (aged 48)
- Known for: Pioneering surgical techniques and founding one of the first hospital burn units

Joel Noe (March 7, 1943 – September 13, 1991), FACS, was a plastic surgeon at Beth Israel Hospital in Boston, Massachusetts, who founded one of the nation's first burn units and argon laser programs. He specialized in burn care and the laser removal of birthmarks.

Noe, an assistant clinical professor at Harvard Medical School, was editor of Aesthetic Surgery, the journal of the American Society for Aesthetic Plastic Surgery. In addition to his 54 publications in peer-reviewed journals and 22 book chapters, he was also a coeditor of Chronic Wound Problems (1983, Little, Brown and Company), Cutaneous Laser Surgery: Principles and Methods (1983, John Wiley and Sons), and Illustrated Cutaneous Laser Surgery (1990, Appleton & Lange).

A native of Boston, Noe graduated from Marblehead High School in 1961, Harvard College in 1965, and Harvard Medical School in 1969. He trained in surgery at the Massachusetts General Hospital, where he was named Outstanding Surgical Intern, and in plastic surgery at the Stanford University Medical Center until 1975; in 1974–5, under the Interplast Volunteer Program, Noe performed corrective surgery on children in Latin America with birth defects such as cleft palates.

In 1977, two years after joining the Beth Israel, Noe founded and directed the hospital's burn unit and argon laser program.

Some wine-colored birthmarks known as capillary hemangiomas, which occur in about one out of 200 Americans, were previously treated with an argon laser. Noe taught hundreds of physicians from around the world how to use the device, and appeared on Good Morning America on 11 July 1990 to discuss the use of lasers in plastic surgeries. Argon lasers are no longer used due to the effectiveness and much-improved safety of the cooled pulsed dye laser.

Noe died of cancer on 13 September 1991. In his memory, a youth basketball league has been named after him in his family's hometown of Brookline, Massachusetts, where he volunteered as a coach for the Brookline youth basketball league. Joel was married to Paula H. (Jacobson) Noe, and had 3 sons, Jason, David and Alex.
