= We the People March =

2019 demonstration in the United States

Coordinates: 38.894°N 77.027°W

- Promotional artwork for the demonstration
- Date: September 21, 2019
- Location: United States
- Type: Demonstrations
- Website: wethepeoplemarch2019.org

The We the People March was a demonstration in Washington, D.C., in the United States, held on September 21, 2019.

The march was advertised as an event to remind elected officials that they work for the people. Its organizer Amy Siskind said that members of Congress, and especially Nancy Pelosi, the Speaker of the House at the time, "need to feel the pressure to hold the Trump regime accountable. They have failed at that." Siskind, who is well known for publishing The Weekly List, an online chronicle of what she calls the "not normal" events happening under the Trump administration, came up with the idea for the march over the summer after realizing that there was "a broad sense of frustration" among voters following the midterm elections in November 2018. She said that "I got the feeling that people wanted to do something. They wanted to take to the streets and march."

While the march had a broad mission statement, participants organized around a number of specific issues, including gun legislation and calls for the impeachment of President Donald Trump. The march took place just three days before then–House Speaker Nancy Pelosi announced the opening of an impeachment inquiry against Donald Trump.

== Activities ==
The march in Washington, D.C., drew thousands of protestors, including Martina Navratilova. The crowd marched down Pennsylvania Avenue from a starting point near the Trump International Hotel and ended at the U.S. Capitol.

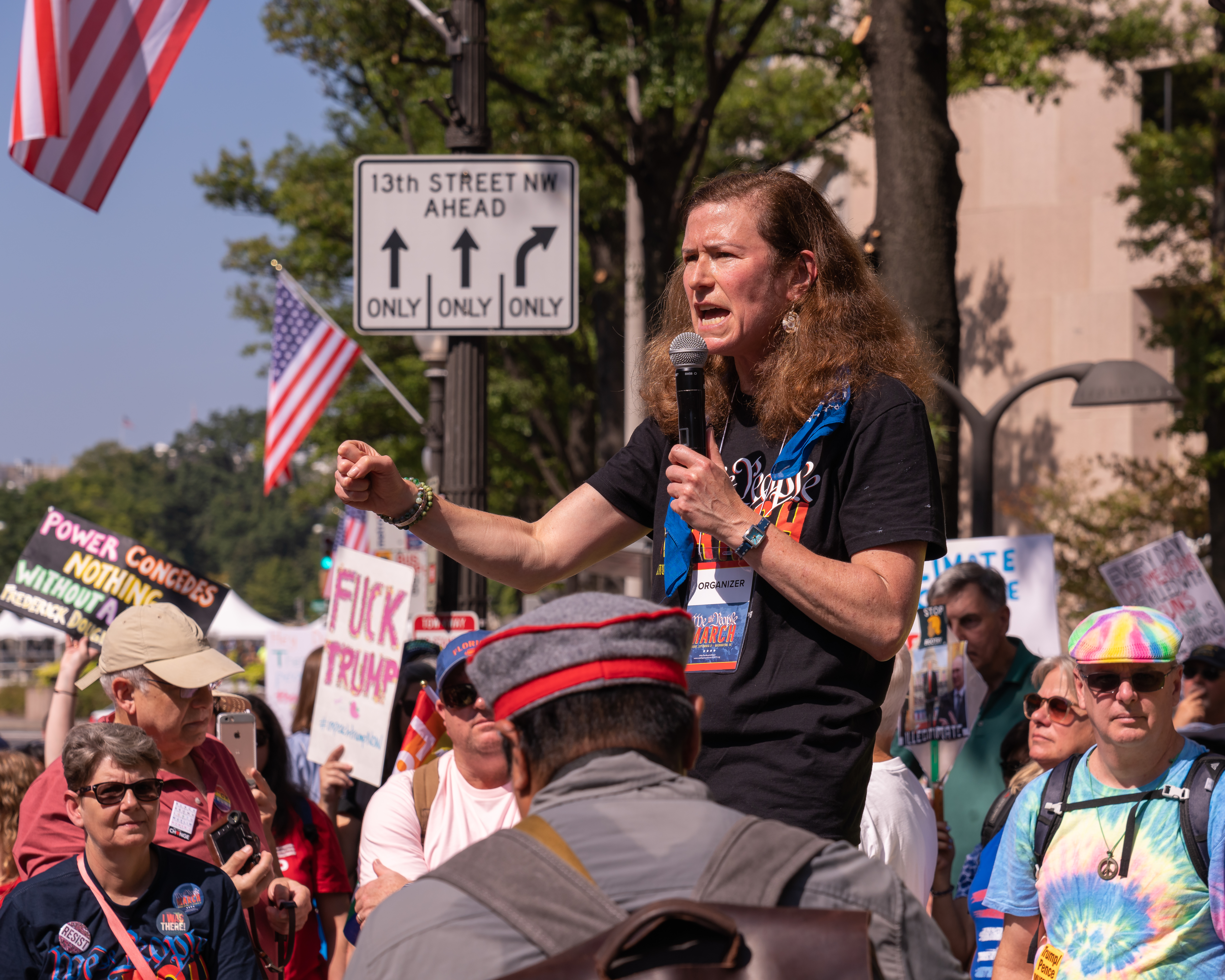
Amy Siskind at the march

Sixty-five other solidarity marches took place on the same day across the U.S. In addition to Washington, D.C., activities were planned in the following cities:

- Asheville, North Carolina
- Augusta, Maine
- Beaver, Pennsylvania
- Dunkirk, New York
- Franklin, Massachusetts
- Georgetown, Texas
- Glens Falls, New York
- Huntsville, Alabama
- Kingston, New York
- Long Beach, California
- New Orleans, Louisiana
- Northampton, Massachusetts
- Portland, Oregon
- Rochester, New York
- Silverdale, Washington
- St. Petersburg, Florida
- Wilmington, Ohio
