= Marblehead High School =

- Marblehead Magicians

Location
- 2 Humphrey Street; Marblehead, Massachusetts 01945; United States
- Coordinates: 42°29′32″N 70°52′09″W

Information
- Type: Public high school
- School district: Marblehead Public Schools
- CEEB code: 221325
- NCES School ID: 250726001124
- Principal: Michele Carlson
- Teaching staff: 84.00 (FTE)
- Grades: 9–12
- Gender: Coeducational
- Enrollment: 874 (2023–2024)
- Student to teacher ratio: 10.40
- Colors: Red and black
- Athletics conference: Northeastern Conference
- Mascot: Magician
- Rival: Swampscott High School
- Accreditation: NEASC
- Website: Official website

Marblehead High School is a public high school located in Marblehead, Massachusetts, United States.

== History ==
The school has approximately 879 students. The current campus began construction in 2001, and opened for the 2002–2003 school year. In 2002, National Grand Bank opened a student-operated bank branch in the school.

== Academics ==
The school currently employs approximately 70 teachers among five core subjects (Mathematics, English language, Social Studies, and the Sciences), foreign languages (Spanish language, French language, and Latin), as well as special education staff and tutors.

== Athletics ==
Currently, Marblehead High School has over thirty sports teams for fall, winter, and spring sports. The school mascot for most sports is the Magicians. However, the boys' ice hockey team is known as the Headers, continuing the insistence of former head coach Bob Roland, who coached the team from 1962-1992. Marblehead High School athletics has had significant success in recent years, winning numerous conference and state titles in the past several years, including a state title in hockey in 2011, and their first ever state title in boys cross country in 2015.

- Fall sports
  - Boys Cross-Country
    - (NEC Champs 2015, 2018, 2019, 2021)
  - Girls Cross-Country
  - Field Hockey - 1986 NEC Champions
  - Football
  - Golf
  - Boys Soccer
  - Girls Soccer
  - Football Cheerleading
  - Volleyball
- Winter sports
  - Boys Basketball
  - Girls Basketball
  - Boys Ice Hockey
    - (Div 3 North Champions 2008, 2010, 2011)
    - (State Champs 2011)
    - (NEC Champions 2016)
  - Girls Ice Hockey
  - Boys Swimming
  - Girls Swimming
    - (State Champions 2011, 2016)
    - (NEC Champions 2005-2016)
  - Gymnastics
  - Boys Indoor Track
  - Girls Indoor Track
  - Ski Team
- Spring sports
  - Baseball - 1985 D-2 State Champions; 1992 D-3 State Champions
  - Softball
  - Boys Lacrosse
  - Girls Lacrosse
  - Boys Spring Track
  - Girls Spring Track
  - Boys Tennis
  - Girls Tennis
  - Sailing

== Arts ==
Marblehead High School has an extensive Arts program with courses in Music, Theatre, Drawing, Sculpture, Photography, CAD/Architecture, Television Production, and Woodworking.

== Notable alumni ==
- Keith Ablow (1979), psychiatrist
- Abdul-Malik Abu (transferred), basketball player in the Israeli Premier Basketball League
- Rob Delaney (1995), comedian
- Shalane Flanagan (2000), Olympic long-distance runner
- Loyd Grossman, author
- Dick Hinch, member of the New Hampshire House of Representatives
- Wendy Hunt (1970), disco club DJ
- Bob Ingalls, professional football player
- Joel Mark Noe, surgeon
- Bruce Rosenbaum, artist
- Cory Schneider (transferred), professional ice hockey player
- Charlie Semine, actor
- Amy Siskind (1984), activist

== See also ==
- List of high schools in Massachusetts
