= Wendy Hunt =

American DJ

- Born: September 8, 1952; Glendale, California, U.S.
- Died: August 7, 2017 (age 64); Wilton Manors, Florida, U.S.
- Other names: Wendella Blendella, Queen Mother of Disco
- Occupation: Club DJ

Wendy Hunt (September 8, 1952 – August 7, 2017) was an American disco club DJ, based in Florida and Massachusetts.

== Early life and education ==
Hunt was born in Glendale, California and raised in Marblehead, Massachusetts. She was the daughter of Donald Edgar Hunt and Yvonne Edwina Riddle. She graduated from Marblehead High School in 1970, and attended Northeastern University, where she began training for a career in nursing.

== Career ==
Hunt began working as a DJ in 1974, at Club 1270 in Boston. As "one of Boston's few women DJs" at the time, she soon developed a following, and was in demand as a disco club DJ and at gay community events in various cities, including the Winter Party in Miami's South Beach, White Party Palm Springs, Purple Party Dallas, and Ascension Party Fire Island Pines. She also worked on cruises and at fundraising events, mixed music for radio programs, and produced records. In early 2017, she spoke at the "first Pride Fort Lauderdale of the Trump era".

== Personal life ==
Hunt acknowledged struggles with addiction and bipolar disorder. She was a volunteer for Labrador Retriever Rescue of Florida. Hunt died by suicide in summer 2017, at the age of 64, in Wilton Manors, Florida.
