= National Grand Bank =

- Company type: Privately held company
- Industry: Banking
- Founded: March 17, 1831; 195 years ago (as Grand Bank)
- Headquarters: Marblehead, Massachusetts
- Key people: James E. Nye, President & CEO
- Website: www.ngbank.com

National Grand Bank of Marblehead is a bank headquartered in Marblehead, Massachusetts. It was named in honor of the brave "men o’ Marblehead" and their dangerous fishing voyages.

== History ==
The bank was founded on March 17, 1831 as the Grand Bank, a state bank serving mariners and merchants.

On October 3, 1864, the bank voted to surrender the state charter and begin operating as a national bank. December 31, 1864, it received a federal bank charter and was renamed National Grand Bank of Marblehead, commencing national operations on February 1, 1865.

In 2002, the bank opened a student-operated branch in Marblehead High School.
