= Matt Farrell =

American basketball player (born 1996)

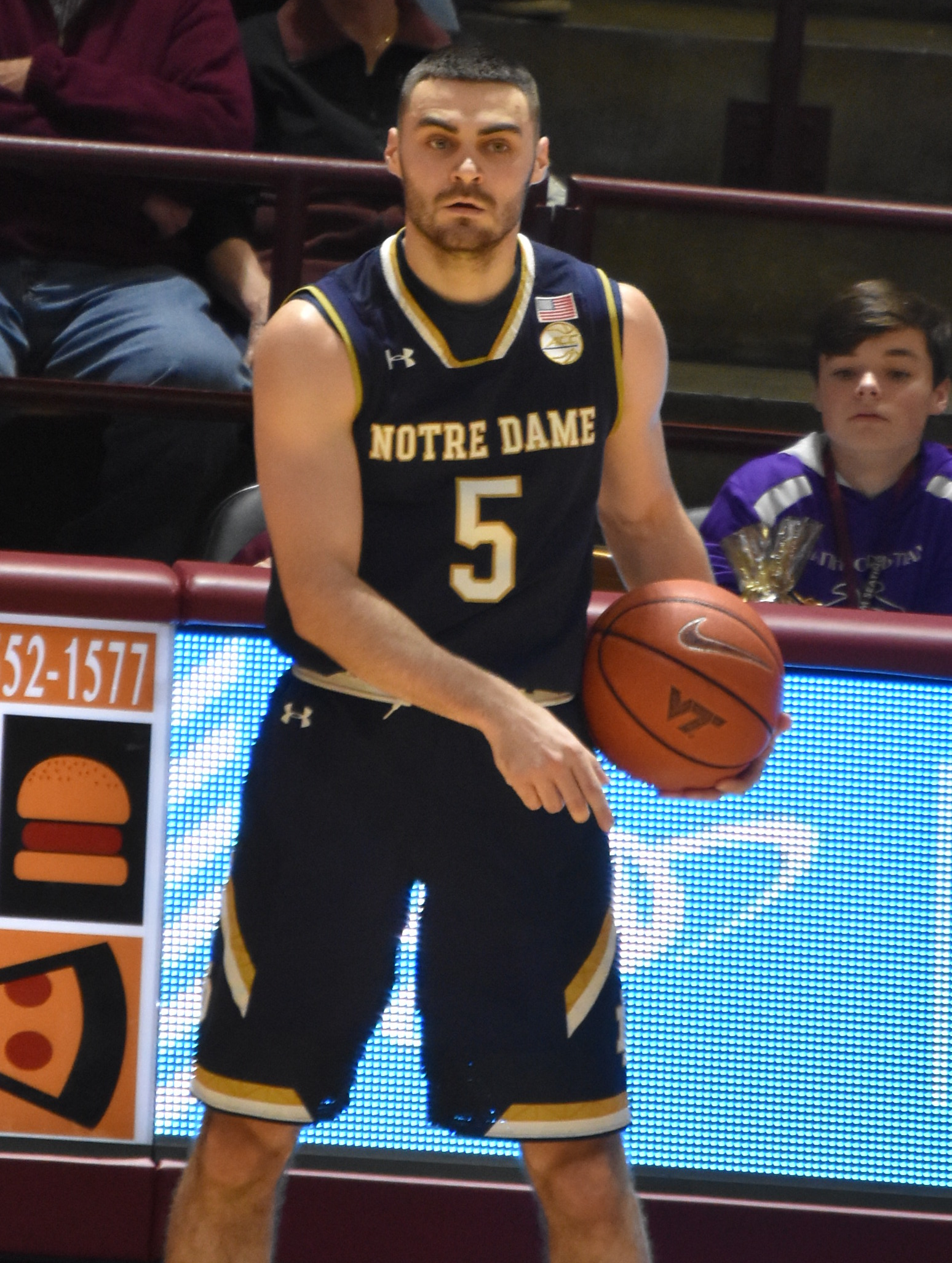
- Farrell playing for Notre Dame

Personal information
- Born: March 15, 1996 (age 30) New Brunswick, New Jersey, U.S.
- Listed height: 6 ft 1 in (1.85 m)
- Listed weight: 175 lb (79 kg)

Career information
- High school: Point Pleasant Beach (Point Pleasant Beach, New Jersey)
- College: Notre Dame (2014–2018)
- NBA draft: 2018: undrafted
- Playing career: 2018–2022
- Position: Point guard

Career history
- 2018–2019: Delaware Blue Coats
- 2019–2020: Austin Spurs
- 2020: Northern Arizona Suns
- 2020–2021: Büyükçekmece Basketbol
- 2021: Ironi Ness Ziona B.C.
- 2021–2022: EWE Baskets Oldenburg

Career highlights
- Third-team All-ACC (2018)
- Stats at Basketball Reference

Matthew Thomas Farrell (born March 15, 1996) is an American former professional basketball player. He played college basketball for the University of Notre Dame.

== Early life ==
Born in New Brunswick, New Jersey, Farrell grew up in Point Pleasant Beach, New Jersey and attended Point Pleasant Beach High School. He committed to Boston College as a senior. However, his plans changed when the college fired Steve Donahue as the basketball coach in 2014. Instead, Farrell signed with Notre Dame in March 2014 because his grandfather Bob Farrell attended the school and frequently told stories of his time there. Farrell was the Asbury Park Press 2014 boys basketball player of the year after averaging 19.5 points, 5.9 assists, 3.8 rebounds and 3.9 steals per game as a senior. He led Point Beach to a 29–2 record and the second consecutive Shore Conference Class B Central division title. Farrell scored 1,431 points and dished out 545 assists in his high school career.

== College career ==
Farrell joined the starting lineup for the postseason as a sophomore and helped the Fighting Irish reach the Elite Eight. He averaged 14.1 points and 5.4 assists per game as a junior while shooting 42 percent from 3-point range as Notre Dame finished 26-10 and advanced to the NCAA Tournament's second round. He was an All-ACC Honorable Mention as a junior. Farrell missed several games in early January 2018 with a right ankle sprain, leaving Notre Dame without their two best players since Bonzie Colson fractured his foot. On February 17, Farrell scored a career-high 37 points and made a school-record 10 3-pointers with seven assists to help Notre Dame defeat Boston College 84–67. He made a long 3-pointer to give Notre Dame the lead with eight seconds remaining in a win against Wake Forest on February 24 and finished with 21 points. In the game, Farrell surpassed the 1,000 point mark for his career. At the conclusion of the regular season, Farrell was named to the All-ACC Third Team. As a senior, Farrell averaged 16.3 points and 5.3 assists per game. After the season, he signed with sports agent Keith Glass and participated in the Portsmouth Invitational Tournament.

== Professional career ==
=== Rytas Vilnius (2018) ===
After going undrafted in the 2018 NBA draft, Farrell signed with the Miami Heat for the 2018 NBA Summer League. On July 31, 2018, he signed with Rytas Vilnius of the Lithuanian Basketball League (LKL). On September 23, Rytas Vilnius and Matt Farrell parted ways.

=== Delaware Blue Coats (2018–2019) ===
On October 10, 2018, Farrell signed with the Philadelphia 76ers. Farrell was waived on October 12. He was added to the Delaware Blue Coats training camp roster.

=== Austin Spurs (2019–2020) ===
For the 2019–20 season, Farrell joined the Austin Spurs.

=== Northern Arizona Suns (2020) ===
On January 15, 2020, the Northern Arizona Suns announced that they had acquired Farrell from the Austin Spurs for the returning right to Peter Jok. He suffered a hip injury in late February and missed several games. Farrell averaged 9.1 points, 2.4 rebounds and 5.0 assists per game.

=== Büyükçekmece (2020–2021) ===
On August 11, 2020, Farrell signed with Büyükçekmece Basketbol of the Turkish Basketbol Süper Ligi. He averaged 14.2 points, 5.6 assist and 1.3 steals per game.

=== Ironi Ness Ziona (2021) ===
On August 13, 2021, Farrell signed with Ironi Ness Ziona B.C. of the Israeli Basketball Super League. On October 6, 2021, he has parted ways with the club.

=== EWE Baskets Oldenburg (2021–2022) ===
On December 13, 2021, Farrell signed with EWE Baskets Oldenburg of the Basketball Bundesliga.
