= Abdul-Malik Abu =

American basketball player (born 1995)

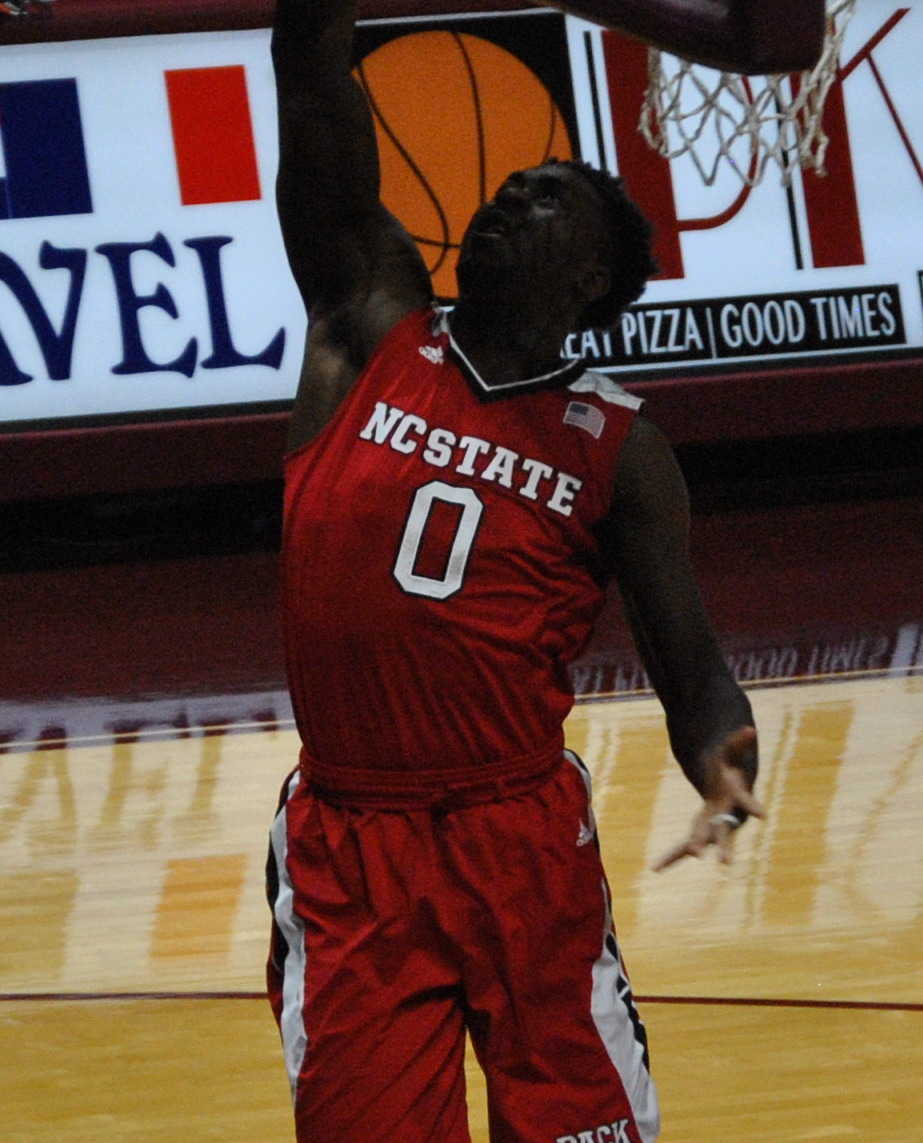
- Abu playing for NC State

No. 1 – Kipaş İstaklal Basketbol
- Position: Power forward
- League: TBL

Personal information
- Born: September 16, 1995 (age 31) Boston, Massachusetts, U.S.
- Listed height: 6 ft 8 in (2.03 m)
- Listed weight: 240 lb (109 kg)

Career information
- High school: Marblehead (Marblehead, Massachusetts); Kimball Union Academy (Meriden, New Hampshire)
- College: NC State (2014–2018)
- NBA draft: 2018: undrafted
- Playing career: 2018–present

Career history
- 2018–2019: Vrijednosnice Osijek
- 2019–2020: Sporting CP
- 2020–2021: Lokman Hekim Fethiye Belediyespor
- 2021–2022: Changwon LG Sakers
- 2022: s.oliver Würzburg
- 2022–2023: Hapoel Galil Elyon
- 2023: MZT Skopje
- 2024: Fuenlabrada
- 2024–2025: Twarde Pierniki Toruń
- 2026–present: Kipaş İstaklal Basketbol

Career highlights
- Macedonian League champion (2023); Macedonian Cup winner (2023)

Abdul-Malik Abu (born September 16, 1995), is an American professional basketball player for Kipaş İstaklal Basketbol of the Türkiye Basketbol Ligi (TBL).

== High school career ==
Abu first attended Marblehead High School in Marblehead, Massachusetts before transferred to Kimball Union Academy in Meriden, New Hampshire to play for coach Mike Olson. As a senior, he averaged 24.5 points and 10.5 rebounds per game while leading Kimball to a (61–21) overall record and was named NEPSAC Player of the year in 2014.

Considered a four-star recruit, Abu was ranked 32nd in the ESPN 100 for the class of 2014. On September 7, 2013, Abu committed to NC State University to play college basketball.

== College career ==
Abu spent his college career playing for the NC State Wolfpack in the Atlantic Coast Conference (ACC). As a freshman in 2014–2015, Abu averaged 6.4 points and 4.7 rebounds per game. As a sophomore, Abu became the starting power forward for the Wolfpack, where he finished second in scoring for NC State after averaging 12.9 points per game and 8.8 rebounds per game ranking fifth in the ACC for rebounds. As a junior, Abu became the focal point for a young Wolfpack team that featured incoming freshman's Dennis Smith Jr., Ömer Yurtseven, and Markell Johnson. On November 11, 2016, Abu recorded 15 points and 11 rebounds in an 81–79 win against Georgia Southern. On the season, Abu averaged, 11.8 points per game and 7.0 rebounds per game, while shooting 52.9% from the field and 71.1% at the foul line.

== Professional career ==
In September 2018, Abu signed for Vrijednosnice Osijek of the Croatian League and Alpe Adria Cup.

In August 2019, Abu signed for Sporting CP, a team of the Portuguese League. He averaged 13 points and 7 rebounds per game.

On October 1, 2020, Abu signed with Lokman Hekim Fethiye Belediyespor of the Turkish Basketbol Süper Ligi.

He began the 2021–22 season with the Changwon LG Sakers of the Korean Basketball League, averaging 5.1 points and 3.1 rebounds per game. On February 16, 2022, Abu signed with s.Oliver Wuerzburg of the Basketball Bundesliga.

On July 3, 2022, he has signed with Hapoel Galil Elyon of the Israeli Premier League.

On August 2, 2024, he signed with Twarde Pierniki Toruń of the Polish Basketball League (PLK).

On January 6, 2026, he signed with Kipaş İstaklal Basketbol of the Türkiye Basketbol Ligi (TBL).

== Personal life ==
Abu is a devout Muslim and prays multiple times a day.

Abu is a Mattapan Resident
