= Amy Siskind =

American liberal activist and writer (born 1965)

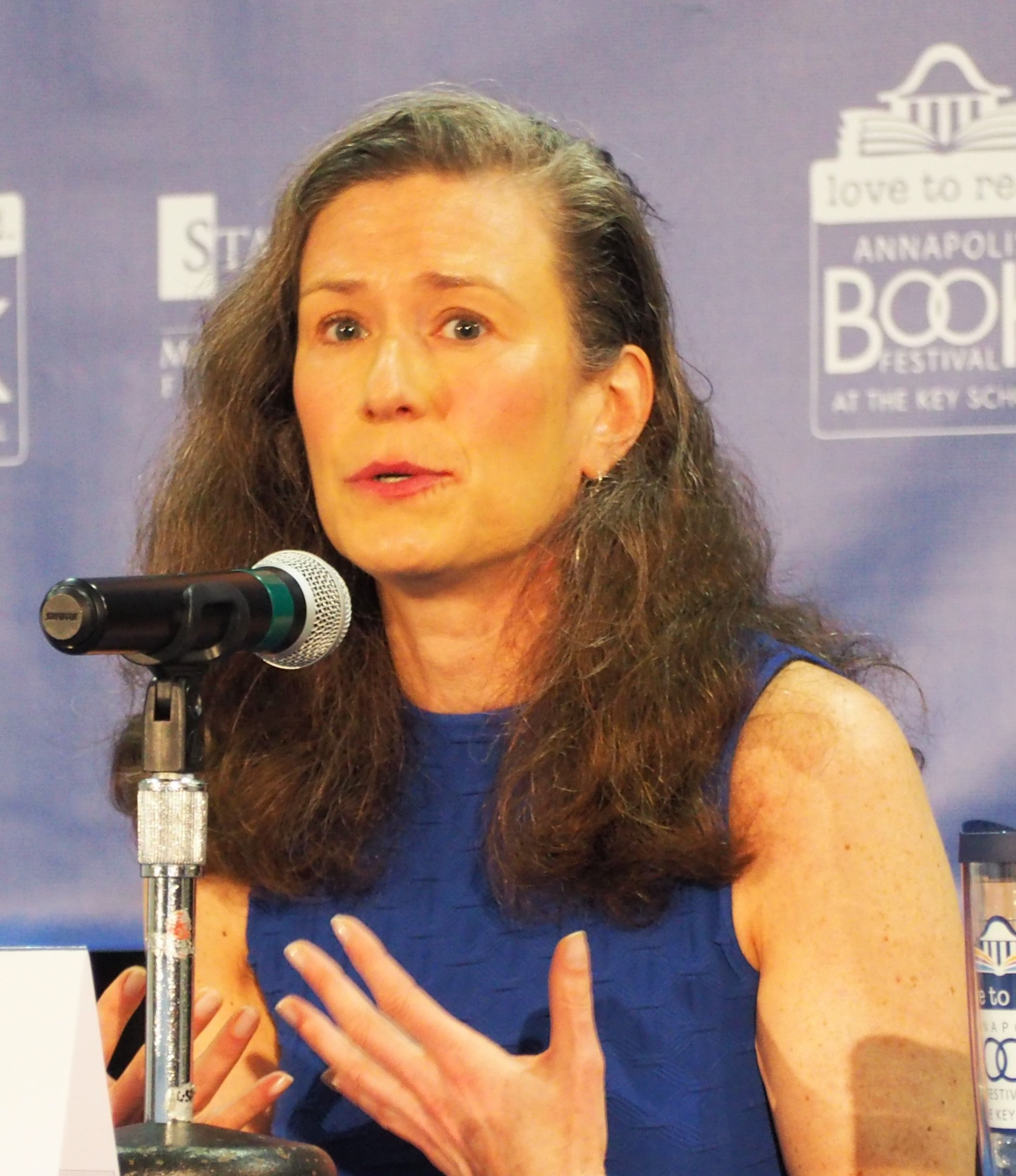
- Siskind in April 2018
- Born: December 16, 1965 (age 60); Marblehead, Massachusetts, U.S.
- Education: Marblehead High School
- Alma mater: Cornell University (BA); NYU Stern School of Business (MBA)
- Occupations: Activist, author
- Children: 2
- Writing career
- Years active: 2008–present
- Subjects: Politics, women's rights
- Notable work: The List: A Week-by-Week Reckoning of Trump’s First Year (2018)
- Website: amysiskind.com

Amy Siskind (born December 16, 1965) is an American activist and writer. She is the author of The List: A Week-by-Week Reckoning of Trump’s First Year (2018) and organizer of the We the People March.

== Early life and education ==
Siskind was born in Marblehead, Massachusetts, to Jewish parents, Bernard Siskind and Selma Lipsky Siskind, and is the youngest of five siblings. She attended Marblehead High School, graduating in 1984. She earned a Bachelor of Arts in economics from Cornell University in 1987, and a Master of Business Administration in finance and international business from the New York University Stern School of Business in 1992.

== Career ==
=== Early career ===
As a Wall Street executive, Siskind was a pioneer and expert in the distressed debt trading market. She became the first female Managing Director at Wasserstein Perella & Co. in 1996, at the age of 31, and later ran trading departments at Morgan Stanley and Imperial Capital, where she was also a partner. Siskind worked 20 years on Wall Street before retiring in 2006.

=== The New Agenda and political activism ===
Siskind was an early supporter of Hillary Clinton during the 2008 United States presidential election cycle, having previously supported Clinton's re-election bid to the United States Senate, and having taken her daughter to meet Clinton at an event in 2006. Siskind has drawn criticism from liberals for voting for John McCain over Barack Obama.

In August 2008, Siskind co-founded The New Agenda in her living room with 30 Hillary Clinton supporters who alleged sexism and misogyny were at play during the 2008 election. The New Agenda is a non-profit organization "dedicated to improving the lives of women and girls by bringing about systemic change in the media, at the workplace, at school and at home". As of August 2019 she is president of the organization. It focuses on issues that affect the success of women, including pay discrimination, sexual assault and sexual harassment.

Siskind was reported to be one of the earliest supporters of the Me Too movement, sparked by a tweet from Alyssa Milano on October 15, 2017, for which Siskind tweeted her own support within the first hundred minutes. In October 2018, in the days following the Pittsburgh synagogue shooting, Siskind posted on Facebook that she was organizing an anti-hate vigil in her Westchester County community. After a local newspaper ran a story about it, Proud Boys founder Gavin McInnes and his family, who lived in the nearby community of Larchmont, New York, appeared at Siskind's door without invitation or forewarning; she called the police.

=== The List ===
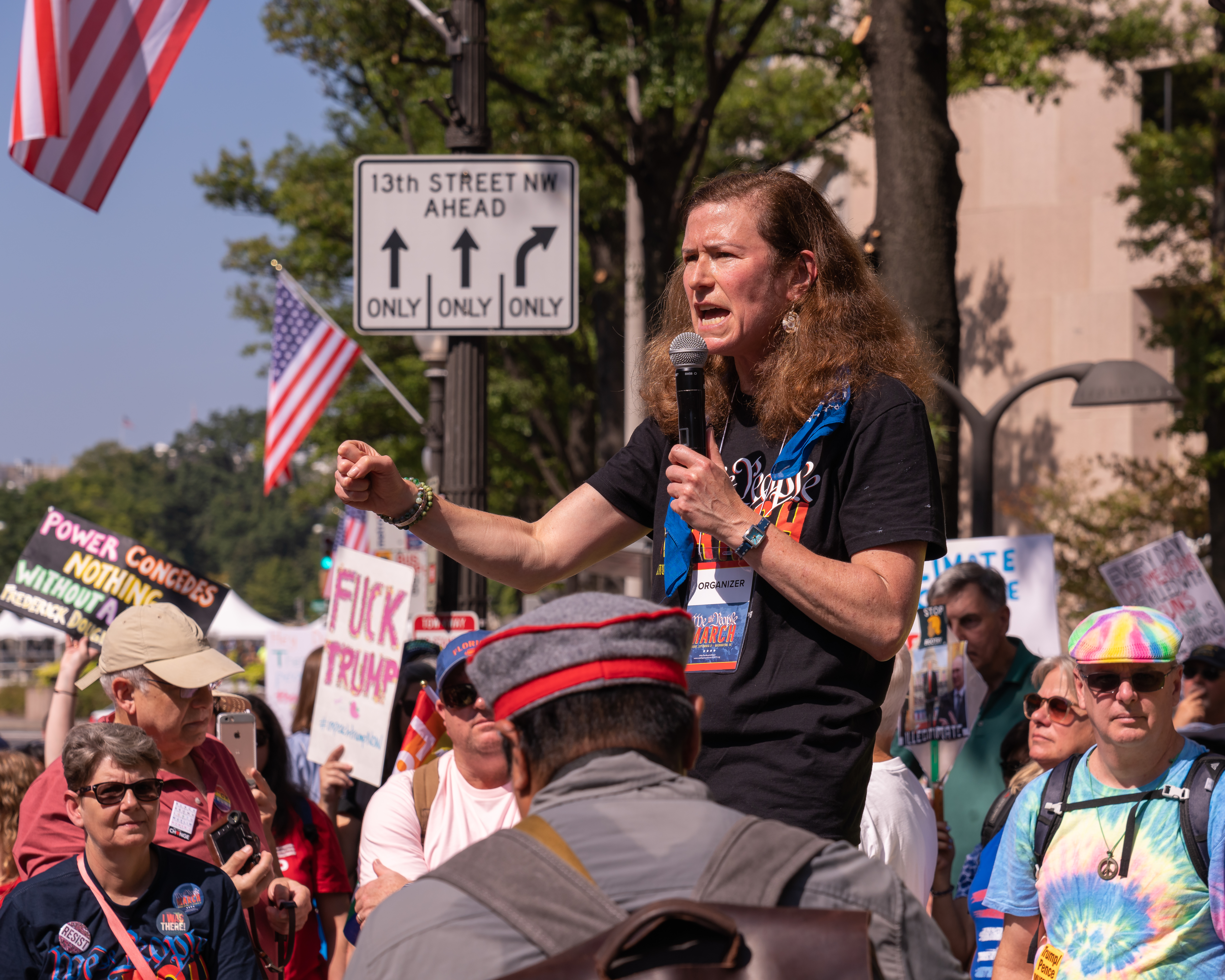
Siskind speaking at the We The People march

In November 2016, Siskind started keeping a weekly list of not-normal events of the Trump administration, and posting the lists on social media. Siskind indicated that she did not intend to merely recite normal political disputes, but to catalogue "things that are uncharacteristic of our democracy". In September 2017, she was named in Politico's 2017 "Politico 50". In March 2018 she compiled the first year of weekly lists and published them as The List: A Week-by-Week Reckoning of Trump's First Year. In June 2018, Siskind started The Weekly List podcast to accompany the lists; writing in Forbes in July 2018, Jo Piazza listed this as one of the "Podcasts Created by Women You Need to Be Listening To Right Now". In July 2017, the United States Library of Congress began archiving her weekly reports. Siskind acknowledged in an interview the following year that a downside of taking such a highly public stance is that "I can tweet things that are inarticulate and be attacked for months and get death threats".

In 2018, The List: A Week-by-Week Reckoning of Trump's First Year was called one of the best books of 2018 by Carlos Lozada of The Washington Post. Her podcast was also recognized by Marie Claire in 2019. Siskind also organized the 2019 We the People March, a national march advertised as an event to remind elected officials that they work for the American people. The march took place on September 21, 2019, in Washington D.C., with others in various cities across the United States.

In 2021, Siskind donated The List collection to the Annenberg School library. The List was archived along with Siskind's podcast and other content she had created.

== Personal life ==
Siskind lives in Westchester County, New York with her two children. She is openly lesbian.
