= Ryan Luther =

American basketball player

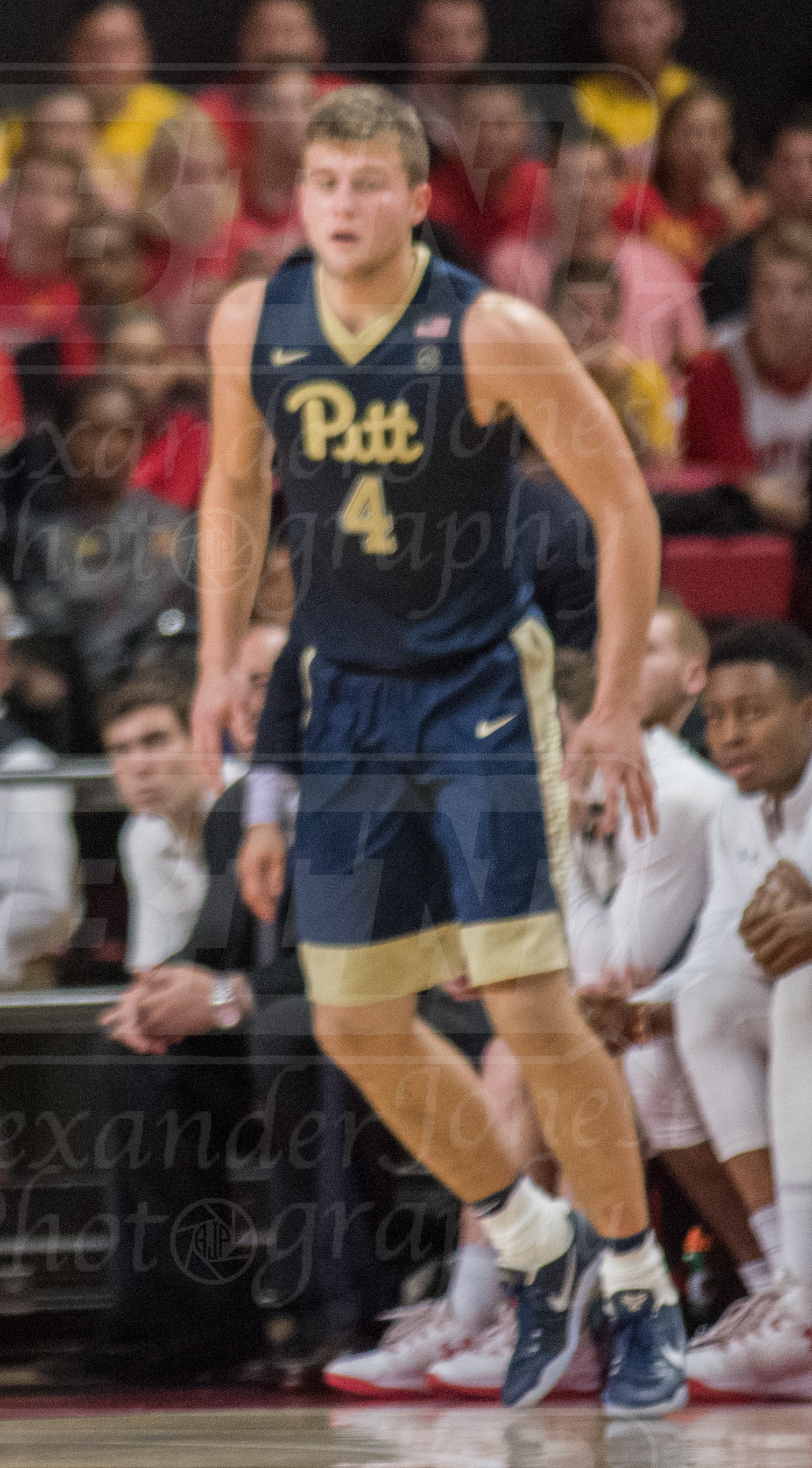
- Luther with Pittsburgh

No. 11 – Nagoya Diamond Dolphins
- Position: Power forward
- League: B.League

Personal information
- Born: September 10, 1995 (age 31) Gibsonia, Pennsylvania, U.S.
- Listed height: 6 ft 9 in (2.06 m)
- Listed weight: 225 lb (102 kg)

Career information
- High school: Hampton (Allison Park, Pennsylvania)
- College: Pittsburgh (2014–2018); Arizona (2018–2019)
- NBA draft: 2019: undrafted
- Playing career: 2019–present

Career history
- 2019–2020: BK Ventspils
- 2020–2021: Darüşşafaka Tekfen
- 2021–2022: Gaziantep Basketbol
- 2022–2023: UCAM Murcia
- 2023–2024: Manisa BB
- 2024–2026: Osaka Evessa
- 2026–present: Nagoya Diamond Dolphins

Ryan Shanahan Luther (born September 10, 1995) is an American professional basketball player for the Nagoya Diamond Dolphins of the Japanese B.League. He played college basketball for the Pittsburgh Panthers and Arizona Wildcats.

== High school career ==
Luther attended Hampton High School. During his senior season, he scored 30 points against Norwin High School in the Penn-Trafford Basketball Tournament and broke the school scoring record. Luther signed with Pittsburgh on October 25, 2013, choosing the Panthers over Duquesne and Dayton.

== College career ==
Luther began his collegiate career at Pittsburgh and played sparingly as a freshman. As a sophomore, he averaged 5.2 points and 3.0 rebounds per game. Following Luther's sophomore season, Pittsburgh coach Jamie Dixon left for TCU and was replaced by Kevin Stallings. On December 17, 2016, Luther scored a career-high 20 points and grabbed seven rebounds in a 83-73 win against Rice. He averaged 5.7 points and 3.9 rebounds per game as a junior but missed 12 games with a right foot injury sustained in practice. Luther averaged 12.7 points and 10.1 rebounds per game as a senior but missed the Panthers' final 22 games after sustaining a season-ending foot injury. He was granted an additional year of eligibility by the NCAA and opted to transfer to Arizona. As a redshirt senior at Arizona, Luther averaged 8.4 points and 4.3 rebounds per game while shooting 37.5% from 3-point range. He started 20 of 32 games for the Wildcats, missing several games in the starting lineup due to a finger injury in the Maui Invitational.

== Professional career ==
After his graduation from Arizona, Luther signed with BK Ventspils of the Latvian league on August 12, 2019. He averaged 18.0 points and 8.9 rebounds per game and shot 48.4% from 3-point range before the season was suspended in March 2020. On July 30, 2020, Luther signed with Darüşşafaka Tekfen of the Turkish Basketbol Süper Ligi. He averaged 8 points and 5 rebounds per game.

On July 17, 2021, Luther signed with Gaziantep Basketbol.

On July 5, 2022, he has signed with UCAM Murcia in the Liga ACB.

On June 1, 2023, he signed with Manisa BB.

On August 4, 2026, Luther signed with Nagoya Diamond Dolphins of the Japanese B.League.

=== The Basketball Tournament ===
Luther joined Herd That, a team composed primarily of Marshall alumni, in The Basketball Tournament 2020. On July 9, Luther tallied nine points and six rebounds and hit the game-winning layup in a 102-99 comeback win against The Money Team. He scored 11 points as Herd That fell to Overseas Elite 93-76 in the quarterfinals.

== Personal life ==
Luther is the son of Bill Luther, who attended Duquesne. One of Luthers' uncles, Brian Shanahan, was a 1,000-point scorer at Duquesne. Luther's cousin Mike Shanahan played college football for Pittsburgh as a wide receiver. Luther's twin brother Collin played basketball at Elon, and his older brother Bill played at Pitt-Johnstown.
