= Dorukhan Engindeniz =

Turkish basketball player (born 1992)

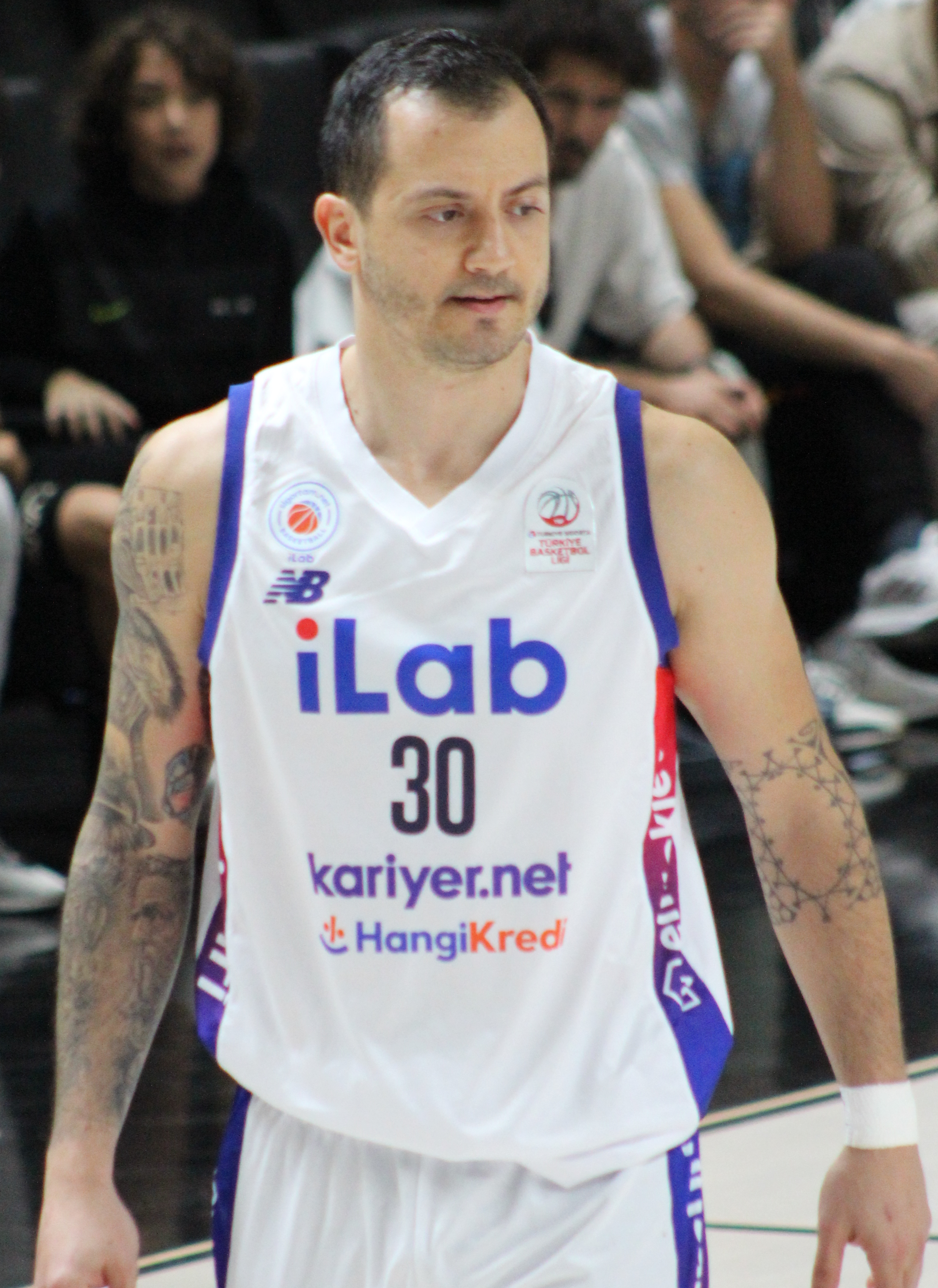

Free Agent
- Position: Shooting guard

Personal information
- Born: November 29, 1992 (age 33) Ankara, Turkey
- Listed height: 6 ft 7 in (2.01 m)
- Listed weight: 191 lb (87 kg)

Career information
- Playing career: 2015–present

Career history
- 2015: Maliye Milli Piyango
- 2015–2016: Gelişim Koleji
- 2016–2017: Bahçeşehir Koleji
- 2017–2018: Eskişehir Basket
- 2018–2019: Afyon Belediye
- 2019–2020: OGM Ormanspor
- 2020–2021: Petkim Spor
- 2021–2022: Türk Telekom
- 2022–2023: Petkim Spor
- 2023–2024: Manisa BB
- 2024–2026: Trabzonspor

Dorukhan Engindeniz (born November 29, 1992) is a Turkish professional basketball player who last played for Trabzonspor of the Basketbol Süper Ligi (BSL).
