= Igor Kokoškov =

Serbian basketball player and coach (born 1971)

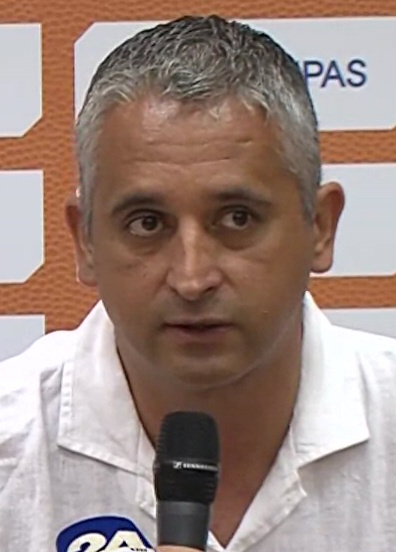
- Kokoškov in 2017

Personal information
- Born: 17 December 1971 (age 54) Banatski Brestovac, SR Serbia, SFR Yugoslavia
- Listed height: 1.94 m (6 ft 4 in)

Career information
- College: University of Belgrade
- Position: Head coach
- Coaching career: 1992–present

Career highlights
- As assistant coach: NBA champion (2004); NBA All-Star Game (2006)
Medals
Men's basketball
Head coach for Slovenia
EuroBasket
Gold medal – first place	2017 Finland–Israel–Romania–Turkey	Team

Igor Stefan Kokoškov (Serbian Cyrillic: Игор Стефан Кокошков; born 17 December 1971) is a Serbian professional basketball coach.

He had spent 19 years in the NBA as an assistant coach, with a brief stint as head coach for the Phoenix Suns for a full season. He spent a season in Turkey with Fenerbahçe, before returning to the NBA to become an assistant coach for the Dallas Mavericks in 2021.

Kokoškov was the first European to be a full-time assistant coach in NCAA Division I college basketball, and the first non-American to hold such a position in the NBA. In 2004, he became the first non-American assistant coach to win an NBA championship, and the first to serve on an NBA All-Star Game coaching staff. He is also the first coach born and raised outside of North America to be hired as a head coach in the NBA.

He won EuroBasket 2017, while working as the head coach of the Slovenian men's national team.

== Early career ==
Kokoškov, a graduate of the University of Belgrade, coached various club teams in Belgrade early in his coaching career and was on the staff of the Yugoslav men's and junior national teams. At the age of 24, Kokoškov became the youngest coach in Yugoslavian basketball history, shortly after suffering serious injuries sustained during a 1990 automobile accident, which ended a promising basketball playing career.

His savvy, ambitious nature and command of the English language were factors when he was hired by the University of Missouri Tigers, as a part of their full-time men's basketball coaching staff in 1999, making him the first European to hold such a position in NCAA Division I men's college basketball.

== NBA assistant (2000–2018) ==
In 2000, Kokoškov became the first non-American to be hired as a full-time assistant coach in the NBA, by the Los Angeles Clippers, under head coach Alvin Gentry. In 2003, he joined the Detroit Pistons staff of head coach Larry Brown. He won an NBA championship in 2004 with the Pistons. At the 2006 NBA All-Star Game he served on the Eastern Conference coaching staff.

On 20 June 2008, Kokoškov was named an assistant coach of the Phoenix Suns. On 29 May 2013, Kokoškov was named as assistant coach of the Cleveland Cavaliers. On 17 February 2015, Kokoškov was named as assistant coach for the Orlando Magic, until the end of the season.

On 1 July 2015, Kokoškov was hired by the Utah Jazz to be an assistant coach. On 5 December 2016, Kokoškov led Utah to a win over Los Angeles Lakers, 107–101. Jazz head coach Quin Snyder had fallen ill and missed their game against the Lakers. He would remain assistant coach for the Jazz until their run in the 2018 NBA Playoffs concluded, which ended on 8 May 2018 with a 112–102 loss to the Houston Rockets.

== Phoenix Suns (2018–2019) ==
On 2 May 2018, Kokoškov was hired as the head coach of the Phoenix Suns, returning to the team he was previously with from 2008 to 2013. He became the first head coach born and raised outside of North America in NBA history, and officially took on the role on 14 May. In his official head coaching debut in the NBA on 17 October, Kokoškov led the Suns to a 121–100 victory over the Dallas Mavericks. However, they finished the season with a 19–63 record, tied for the second-worst record in the league. On 22 April 2019, the Suns fired Kokoškov.

== Return to assistant coaching (2019–2020) ==
On 14 June 2019, Kokoškov was named an assistant coach for the Sacramento Kings under new head coach Luke Walton's coaching staff.

== Fenerbahçe (2020–2021) ==
On 4 July 2020, Kokoškov was named the head coach for Fenerbahçe Beko of the Turkish Basketball Super League and the EuroLeague. It is his first club coaching appointment in Europe after 25 years. Kokoskov had a 20–14 record in the EuroLeague and reached the EuroLeague Playoffs where his team got swept by CSKA Moscow. Also, he went 22–8 in the Turkish League before his team got swept by newly crowned EuroLeague champion Anadolu Efes in the domestic finals. On 27 July 2021, he parted ways with Fenerbahçe.

== Return to NBA assistant coaching (2021–2025) ==
On 31 August 2021, Kokoškov was appointed an assistant coach for the Dallas Mavericks. After spending one season with Dallas, on 6 July 2022, Kokoškov was named as assistant coach for the Brooklyn Nets. he parted ways with the Nets in May 2023. On 14 June 2023, Kokoškov was hired as assistant coach for the Atlanta Hawks.

== Anadolu Efes (2025) ==
On 2 July 2025, Kokoškov signed a three-year deal with Anadolu Efes of the Turkish Basketbol Süper Ligi (BSL) and the EuroLeague. On 27 November, he parted ways with the team.

== National team coaching career ==
=== Serbia and Montenegro assistant (2004–2005) ===
Kokoškov was an assistant coach of the Serbia and Montenegro national team at the 2004 Summer Olympics and the 2005 EuroBasket, under renowned European head coach Željko Obradović.

=== Georgia (2008–2015) ===
On 18 April 2008, Kokoškov was named the head coach of the Georgia men's national basketball team. He coached Georgia at 2011 EuroBasket in Lithuania, 2013 EuroBasket in Slovenia and 2015 EuroBasket in Croatia/France. He left after EuroBasket 2015.

=== Slovenia (2016–2017) ===
On 18 January 2016, the Basketball Federation of Slovenia named Kokoškov the new head coach of the Slovenian men's national team, for the next two years. Former Serbian coach Božidar Maljković recommended him for this position to Slovenian Federation Secretary-General Rasho Nesterović.

His contract with Slovenia's national team ended after the EuroBasket 2017 where Slovenia won the gold medal.

=== Serbia (2019–2021) ===
On 20 November 2019, the Basketball Federation of Serbia named Kokoškov the new head coach of the Serbia national team. He appointed Dejan Milojević, Vladimir Jovanović and Jovica Antonić as assistant coaches, as well as Bogdan Karaičić as scout. On 14 September 2021, he parted ways with the Basketball Federation of Serbia as the Serbian team coach.

== Personal life ==
In 1990, Kokoškov was part of a near-fatal car crash which shattered his knee and ended his basketball career.

Kokoškov and his wife, Patricia, were married in the summer of 2009. They have two children: a son and a daughter. On 18 June 2010, Kokoškov became an American citizen.

Georgian President Mikheil Saakashvili honored Kokoškov with an Order of Honour, Georgia's highest civilian honor, on 18 December 2011.

== Head coaching record ==
=== NBA ===
Legend
Regular season	G	Games coached	W	Games won	L	Games lost	W–L %	Win–loss %
Playoffs	PG	Playoff games	PW	Playoff wins	PL	Playoff losses	PW–L %	Playoff win–loss %

Team	Year	G	W	L	W–L%	Finish	PG	PW	PL	PW–L%	Result
Phoenix	2018–19	82	19	63	.232	5th in Pacific	—	—	—	–	Missed playoffs
Career		82	19	63	.232		0	0	0	–	

=== EuroLeague ===
Legend
G	Games coached	W	Games won	L	Games lost	W–L %	Win-loss %

Note: The EuroLeague is not the only competition in which the team played during the season. He also coached in domestic competition, and regional competition if applicable.

Team	Year	G	W	L	W–L%	Result
Fenerbahçe Beko	2020–21	37	20	17	.541	Eliminated in Playoffs
Career		37	20	17	.541	

== See also ==
- List of FIBA EuroBasket winning head coaches
- List of Serbian NBA coaches
- List of foreign NBA coaches
- List of Phoenix Suns head coaches
