= Keith Ablow =

American novelist and life coach

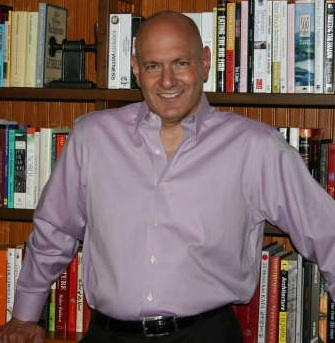
- Born: Keith Russell Ablow; November 23, 1961 (age 64); Marblehead, Massachusetts, U.S.
- Education: Brown University (BS); Johns Hopkins University (MD)
- Political party: Republican
- Children: 2

Keith Russell Ablow (born November 23, 1961) is an American author, life coach, former television personality, and former psychiatrist. He is a former contributor for Fox News Channel and TheBlaze.

Formerly an assistant clinical professor at Tufts University School of Medicine, Ablow resigned as a member of the American Psychiatric Association in 2011, in protest to the APA's tacit support of transgender surgeries, which he considered irresponsible. Ablow's medical license was suspended in May 2019 by the Massachusetts Board of Registration in Medicine. The board concluded he posed an "immediate and serious threat to the public health, safety and welfare", stating that he had engaged in sexual and unethical misconduct towards patients.

According to the Associated Press, Ablow "freely mixes psychiatric assessments with political criticism, a unique twist in the realm of cable news commentary that some medical colleagues find unethical." Ablow resigned from the Massachusetts Board of Registration in Medicine on May 7, 2026.

== Early life and education ==
Ablow was born in Marblehead, Massachusetts, the son of Jewish parents Jeanette Norma and Allan Murray Ablow. Ablow attended Marblehead High School, graduating in 1979. He graduated from Brown University in 1983, magna cum laude, with a Bachelor of Science degree in neurosciences. He received his Doctor of Medicine degree from Johns Hopkins Medical School in 1987 and completed his psychiatry residency at the Tufts-New England Medical Center. He was Board Certified by the American Board of Psychiatry & Neurology in psychiatry in 1993 and forensic psychiatry in 1999.

While a medical student, he worked as a reporter for Newsweek and a freelancer for The Washington Post and Baltimore Sun and USA Today. After his residency, Ablow served as medical director of the Tri-City Mental Health Centers and then became medical director of Heritage Health Systems and Associate Medical Director of Boston Regional Medical Center.

== Television and writing career ==
Ablow has written fifteen books, written for the Journal of the American Medical Association, and written for Psychiatric Times.

Ablow hosted The Dr. Keith Ablow Show, syndicated by Warner Bros. Domestic Television Distribution in the 2006–07 television season. Since his show's cancellation, Ablow has been a contributing editor for Good Housekeeping and a columnist for the New York Post. He contributed commentary and analysis for the Fox News Channel until 2017.

=== Punditry ===
In April 2011, Ablow wrote a health column for FoxNews.com which criticized designer Jenna Lyons for publishing an advertisement in the J. Crew catalogue in which she was depicted painting her young son's toenails hot pink. Ablow wrote that gender distinctions are "part of the magnificent synergy that creates and sustains the human race." The column sparked a controversy around his claims that painting a child's toenails pink could have an effect on their gender identity and led to accusations of overreaction, as was reported upon by numerous news media sources.

In 2013, Ablow said that marriage had "died" because of same-sex marriage. In 2014, he likened same-sex marriage to polygamous relationships or bestiality. He has linked gay parenting to sexual abuse of children.

In June 2014, Ablow accused the 2014 World Cup of having been a plot by President Barack Obama to distract America from what Ablow believed were Obama administration scandals.

In August 2014, as a guest co-host on the Fox News show, Outnumbered, Ablow criticized First Lady Michelle Obama's weight, stating "she needs to drop a few [pounds]." He told the women panelists on the show that they also needed to lose weight.

In October 2014, concerning the Ebola outbreak in West Africa, Ablow, on Fox News, promoted a conspiracy theory that Obama wanted Ebola to spread to America because he wanted America to suffer as much as poor countries. He stated that President Obama was not protecting the United States from Ebola because his "affiliations" and "affinities" were more with Africa than with America. His Ebola comments drew criticism, including from Fox television host Greg Gutfeld.

In May 2015, on another segment of Outnumbered, Ablow stated that he believed that men should be able to "veto" women's abortions.

Ablow was chief spokesperson and brand ambassador for Golo, a company that sells a weight loss supplement. Progressive media watchdog group Media Matters for America raised questions about whether Ablow's endorsement of Golo violates Fox News' policy against product endorsements.

=== Medical ethics ===
The Associated Press has reported that Ablow "freely mixes psychiatric assessments with political criticism, a unique twist in the realm of cable news commentary that some medical colleagues find unethical." Ablow has, for instance, frequently diagnosed former president Barack Obama as having "abandonment issues," without ever having met or treated the former president. He has asserted that Obama dislikes the United States, that he prefers Africa to the United States, and wants the United States to dissolve. He publicly speculated, in an October 2012 Huffington Post op-ed that then-Vice President Joe Biden had dementia after his 2012 VP debate performance.

Ford Vox, a staff physiatrist at the Shepherd Center in Atlanta, said that Ablow's attempts to connect his political views to medical analysis "is really just irresponsible and it's embarrassing for physicians in general." Jeffrey Lieberman, chairman of psychiatry at Columbia University's College of Physicians and Surgeons, and past president of the American Psychiatric Association, remarked, "It is shameful and unfortunate that he is given a platform by Fox News or any other media organization. Basically he is a narcissistic self-promoter of limited and dubious expertise."

=== Sexual assault allegations ===
On February 21, 2019, the Boston Globe reported that Ablow had been accused by multiple patients and employees of sexual assault and harassment; three malpractice lawsuits by former patients allege physical and verbal abuse, and three former employees filed affidavits listing threatening and abusive behavior. The lawsuits were settled out-of-court in the summer of 2019.

On May 15, 2019, the Massachusetts Board of Registration in Medicine indefinitely suspended Ablow's medical license, concluding he posed an "immediate and serious threat to the public health, safety and welfare." New York state has also suspended Ablow's medical license in that state.

Ablow resigned from the Massachusetts Board of Registration in Medicine on May 7, 2026. "Resigned" status means, "Under the Board's regulations, a physician who is under investigation or named in a complaint by the Board may choose to submit a resignation and terminate the investigation. Resignation is a disciplinary action. A physician who has resigned their license may not practice medicine and may not renew their license."

=== DEA raid ===
On February 13, 2020, Ablow's office in Newburyport, Massachusetts, was raided by Drug Enforcement Administration agents executing a search warrant. He has denied allegations of inappropriate sexual activity with patients and illegally diverting prescription drugs.

It is alleged that Ablow prescribed medication to eight employees. When the Board of Registration in Medicine rescinded his license in 2019, they also stated Ablow asked the employees to share the medication with him.

== Potential U.S. Senate candidacy ==
In January 2013, Ablow expressed his interests in possibly running for the U.S. Senate seat vacated by John Kerry, On February 5, 2013, Ablow announced that he would seek the Republican nomination, but only if he did not have to face a primary battle. On February 6, 2013, Ablow said he would not run since other Republican contenders entered the race, and declared his support for Republican State Rep. Dan Winslow.

== Bibliography ==
=== Non-fiction ===
- Medical School: Getting In, Staying In, Staying Human (1987) ISBN 0683000047, 9780683000047
- How to Cope with Depression (1989)
- To Wrestle With Demons: A Psychiatrist Struggles to Understand His Patients and Himself (1992)
- Anatomy of a Psychiatric Illness: Healing the Mind and Brain (1993)
- The Strange Case of Dr. Kappler: The Doctor Who Became a Killer (1994)
- Without Mercy: The Shocking True Story of a Doctor Who Murdered (1996)
- Inside the Mind of Scott Peterson (2005)
- Living the Truth: Transform Your Life Through the Power of Insight and Honesty (2007)
- The 7: Seven Wonders That Will Change Your Life (2011) (co-authored with Glenn Beck)
- Inside the Mind of Casey Anthony: A Psychological Portrait (2011)
- Trump Your Life: 25 Life Lessons from the Ups and Downs of the 45th President of the United States (2020) (co-authored with Christian Josi)

=== Fiction ===
- Denial (1998)
- Projection (1999)
- Compulsion (2002)
- Psychopath (2003)
- Murder Suicide (2004)
- The Architect (2005)

==== Notes ====
These psychological thrillers follow Frank Clevenger, a forensic psychologist from Massachusetts.
