= 2021–22 Galatasaray S.K. (men's basketball) season =

Galatasaray Nef
2021–22 season
- President: Burak Elmas
- Head coach: Ekrem Memnun (until 18 March 2022); Andreas Pistiolis (from 19 March 2022)
- Arena: Sinan Erdem Dome
- Basketbol Süper Ligi: 3rd seed
- Playoffs: Semifinals
- Basketball Champions League: Round of 16
- Turkish Basketball Cup: Semifinals

The 2021–22 season is Galatasaray's 110th season in the existence of the club. The team plays in the Basketball Super League and in the Basketball Champions League.

== Overview ==
=== March ===
It has been announced that as of 18 March 2022, the paths parted with Ekrem Memnun, who has been working as the head coach of the Galatasaray Men's Basketball Team since January 2020-21 season.

As of 19 March 2022, Galatasaray Nef appointed Andreas Pistiolis, who was the first assistant coach in the CSKA Moscow technical staff, to the head coach.

DeVaughn Akoon-Purcell, who had ruptured Achilles tendon in the Riesen Ludwigsburg match played on 23 March 2022, closed the season.

== Team ==
=== Squad information ===
Note: Flags indicate national team eligibility at FIBA-sanctioned events. Players may hold other non-FIBA nationalities not displayed.

Galatasaray roster
Players
Coaches

Pos.	No.	Nat.	Name	Ht.	Wt.	Age
SG	0	(Turkey)	Şen, Acar	1.93 m (6 ft 4 in)		19 – 26 April 2003
PG	1	(Bulgaria)	Bost, Dee	1.88 m (6 ft 2 in)	80 kg (176 lb)	32 – 12 October 1989
G	2	(United States)	Canaan, Isaiah	1.83 m (6 ft 0 in)	91 kg (201 lb)	31 – 21 February 1991
PG	3	(United States)	Trimble, Melo	1.88 m (6 ft 2 in)	85 kg (187 lb)	27 – 2 February 1995
F/C	5	(Senegal)	Ndour, Maurice	2.06 m (6 ft 9 in)	91 kg (201 lb)	29 – 18 June 1992
PF	6	(Turkey)	Kabaca, Sadık Emir	2.08 m (6 ft 10 in)	95 kg (209 lb)	21 – 3 December 2000
PG	7	(Turkey)	Öncel, Rıdvan	1.91 m (6 ft 3 in)	83 kg (183 lb)	25 – 21 February 1997
G	8	(Serbia)	Pušica, Vasilije	1.96 m (6 ft 5 in)	92 kg (203 lb)	26 – 12 September 1995
PG	9	(Turkey)	Erdoğan, Eray	1.85 m (6 ft 1 in)		22 – 25 February 2000
F/C	11	(Turkey)	Arar, Ege	2.08 m (6 ft 10 in)	104 kg (229 lb)	25 – 2 September 1996
SF	12	(Turkey)	Kuş, Canberk	1.98 m (6 ft 6 in)	94 kg (207 lb)	25 – 12 August 1996
SF	13	(Turkey)	Ulubay, Okben	2.00 m (6 ft 7 in)	86 kg (190 lb)	26 – 25 May 1996
PF	24	(United States)	Blackshear, Kerry	2.08 m (6 ft 10 in)	109 kg (240 lb)	25 – 28 January 1997
SF	44	(United States)	Akoon-Purcell, DeVaughn (injured)	1.98 m (6 ft 6 in)	91 kg (201 lb)	28 – 5 June 1993
C	45	(United States)	Kravish, David	2.08 m (6 ft 10 in)	109 kg (240 lb)	29 – 12 September 1992
G/F	61	(Turkey)	Köksal, Göksenin (C)	1.97 m (6 ft 6 in)	93 kg (205 lb)	31 – 8 January 1991

Head coach

- (Greece) Andreas Pistiolis

Assistant coach(es)

- (Turkey) Cenk Akyol
- (Turkey) Tulüat Demirkuş
- (Turkey) Ümit Temoçin
- (Turkey) Gökhan Turan

Athletic trainer(s)

- (Turkey) Bora Bölükbaşı
- (Turkey) Semih Eroğlu

Team manager

- (Turkey) Kerem Tunçeri
- (Turkey) Turgay Zeytingöz
- (Turkey) İbrahim Tilki

Legend

- (C) Team captain
- Injured

- Roster
Updated: April 3, 2022

=== Depth chart ===
Pos.	Starting 5	Bench 1	Bench 2	Bench 3
C	David Kravish	Maurice Ndour	Ege Arar
PF	Kerry Blackshear Jr.	Sadık Emir Kabaca
SF	Okben Ulubay	Canberk Kuş		DeVaughn Akoon-Purcell (injured)
SG	Melo Trimble	Vasilije Pušica	Göksenin Köksal	Açar Şen
PG	Dee Bost	Isaiah Canaan	Rıdvan Öncel	Eray Erdoğan

=== Transactions ===
==== In ====
No.	Pos.	Nat.	Name	Age	Moving from		Ends	Date	Source
1	PG	(Bulgaria)	Dee Bost	31	AS Monaco Basket	(France)	June 2022	11 August 2021	
3	G	(United States)	Melo Trimble	26	Urbas Fuenlabrada	(Spain)	June 2022	10 August 2021	
6	PF	(Turkey)	Sadık Emir Kabaca	20	Beşiktaş Icrypex	(Turkey)	June 2024	23 August 2021	
7	PG	(Turkey)	Rıdvan Öncel	24	Bahçeşehir Koleji	(Turkey)	June 2023	12 August 2021	
11	C	(Turkey)	Ege Arar	24	Petkim Spor	(Turkey)	June 2023	10 August 2021	
12	SF	(Turkey)	Canberk Kuş	24	Petkim Spor	(Turkey)	June 2022	11 August 2021	
13	SF	(Turkey)	Okben Ulubay	25	Petkim Spor	(Turkey)	June 2022	11 August 2021	
24	PF	(United States)	Kerry Blackshear	24	Hapoel Gilboa Galil	(Israel)	June 2023	24 August 2021	
44	SF	(United States)	DeVaughn Akoon-Purcell	28	Tofaş	(Turkey)	June 2023	23 August 2021	
45	C	(United States)	David Kravish	28	Brose Bamberg	(Germany)	June 2022	12 August 2021	
5	F/C	(Senegal)	Maurice Ndour	29	Rytas Vilnius	(Lithuania)	June 2022	3 February 2022	
8	G	(Serbia)	Vasilije Pušica	26	BC Prienai	(Lithuania)	June 2022	3 February 2022	
2	G	(United States)	Isaiah Canaan	30	UNICS Kazan	(Russia)	June 2022	31 March 2022	

1. In players: Players who signed after the beginning of the season

==== Out ====
No.	Pos.	Nat.	Name	Age	Moving to		Date	Source
7	SG	(Turkey)	Yiğit Arslan	25	Tofaş	(Turkey)	1 July 2021	
12	PF	(Australia)	Brock Motum	30	AS Monaco Basket	(France)	2 September 2021	
17	PF	(United States)	Amile Jefferson	28	Retired		21 July 2021	
22	F/C	(Turkey)	Ayberk Olmaz	25	Afyon Belediye	(Turkey)	2 August 2021	
23	SF	(Turkey)	Caner Erdeniz	34	Büyükçekmece Basketbol	(Turkey)	24 July 2021	
27	SG	(United States)	Jordan Crawford	32	Long Island Nets	(United States)	31 December 2021	
50	C	(Egypt)	Assem Marei	29	Changwon LG Sakers	(South Korea)	1 July 2021	
55	PG	(United States)	Pierre Jackson	29	JL Bourg	(France)	11 May 2021	
77	SF	(Turkey)	Saadettin Donat	20	Türk Telekom	(Turkey)	1 July 2021	

=== Coach ===
Nat.	Name	Age.	Previous team		Type	Ends	Date	Source
(Greece)	Andreas Pistiolis	47	CSKA Moscow (assistant)	(Russia)	1.5 years	2023	19 March 2022	

=== Staff and management ===
As of 12 April 2022

Name	Job
Kerem Tunçeri	Managing Director
Andreas Pistiolis	Head Coach
Turgay Zeytingöz	General Manager
İbrahim Tilki	Administrative Manager
Tulüay Demirkuş	Assistant Coach
Gökhan Turan	Assistant Coach
Ümit Temoçin	Assistant Coach
Cenk Akyol	Assistant Coach
Alican Kaş	Physiotherapist
Bora Bölükbaşı	Conditioning and Performance Coach
Semih Eroğlu	Conditioner
Burak Kozan	Masseur
Adnan Güney	Material Manager
Vahit Yılmaz	Transportation

== Pre-season and friendlies ==
=== Friendly match ===
30 August 2021 Friendly Match	Beşiktaş Icrypex	74–86	Galatasaray Nef	Istanbul
		Boxscore		Arena: Akatlar Arena

1 September 2021 Friendly Match	Darüşşafaka Tekfen	66–68	Galatasaray Nef	Istanbul
		Boxscore		Arena: Ayhan Şahenk Sports Hall

3 September 2021 Friendly Match	Galatasaray Nef	76–73	Türk Telekom	Istanbul
		Boxscore		Arena: Sinan Erdem Dome

9 September 2021 Lake Cup	Büyükçekmece Basketbol	76–81	Galatasaray Nef	Büyükçekmece, Istanbul
		Boxscore		Arena: Gazanfer Bilge Sports Hall

10 September 2021 Lake Cup	Galatasaray Nef	84–74	Semt77 Yalovaspor	Büyükçekmece, Istanbul
		Boxscore		Arena: Gazanfer Bilge Sports Hall

13 September 2021 Friendly Match	Galatasaray Nef	72–72	CSO Voluntari	Istanbul
		Boxscore		Arena: Sinan Erdem Dome

16 September 2021 Cevat Soydaş Tournament	Tofaş	88–78	Galatasaray Nef	Bursa
		Boxscore		Arena: Tofaş Nilüfer Sports Hall

17 September 2021 Cevat Soydaş Tournament	Gaziantep Basketbol	68–77	Galatasaray Nef	Bursa
		Boxscore		Arena: Tofaş Nilüfer Sports Hall

18 September 2021 Cevat Soydaş Tournament	Fenerbahçe Beko	75–91	Galatasaray Nef	Bursa
		Boxscore		Arena: Tofaş Nilüfer Sports Hall

26 February 2022 Friendly Match	Galatasaray Nef	91–81	Bahçeşehir Koleji	Ataköy, Istanbul
13:00	Scoring by quarter: 19–20, 21–14, 29–22, 22–25
	Pts: Pušica, Ndour 17	Boxscore		Arena: Sinan Erdem Dome

== Competitions ==
=== Overview ===
Competition	First match	Last match	Starting round	Final position	Record							
Competition	First match	Last match	Starting round	Final position	Pld	W	D	L	PF	PA	PD	Win %
Basketball Super League	26 September 2021	4 June 2022	Regular season	Semifinals	36	23	0	13	3,206	2,974	+232	63.89
Basketball Champions League	6 October 2021	23 March 2022	Regular season	Round of 16	12	6	0	6	958	950	+8	50.00
Turkish Basketball Cup	15 February 2022	18 February 2022	Quarterfinals	Semifinals	2	1	0	1	126	126	+0	50.00
Total					50	30	0	20	4,290	4,050	+240	60.00

Last updated: June 4, 2022
Source: Competitions

=== Basketball Super League ===
==== League table ====
Pos	Team	Pld	W	L	PF	PA	PD	Pts	Qualification or relegation
1	Fenerbahçe Beko	30	24	6	2527	2209	+318	54	Advance to playoffs
2	Anadolu Efes	30	23	7	2699	2405	+294	53	Advance to playoffs
3	Galatasaray Nef	30	20	10	2608	2387	+221	50	Advance to playoffs
4	Gaziantep Basketbol	30	19	11	2414	2276	+138	49	Advance to playoffs
5	Darüşşafaka	30	19	11	2372	2218	+154	49	Advance to playoffs

Source: Basketbol Süper Ligi

==== Results summary ====
Overall						Home					Away				
Pld	W	L	PF	PA	PD	W	L	PF	PA	PD	W	L	PF	PA	PD
30	20	10	2608	2387	+221	10	5	1353	1232	+121	10	5	1255	1155	+100

Last updated: May 7, 2022.
Source: bsl.org.tr

==== Results by round ====
Round	1	2	3	4	5	6	7	8	9	10	11	12	13	14	15	16	17	18	19	20	21	22	23	24	25	26	27	28	29	30
Ground	A	H	A	H	A	H	A	H	A	H	A	H	H	A	H	H	A	H	A	H	A	H	A	H	A	H	A	A	H	A
Result	W	L	W	L	W	W	L	W	W	W	L	L	W	W	W	W	L	W	L	L	L	W	W	L	W	W	W	W	W	W
Position	4	7	5	8	6	5	5	5	5	4	5	6	5	5	4	4	5	6	5	7	7	7	5	8	8	5	5	5	5	3

Updated to match(es) played on May 7, 2022. Source: TBF.org.tr
A = Away; H = Home; W = Win; L = Loss

==== Matches ====
Win Loss

Note: All times are TRT (UTC+3) as listed by the Turkish Basketball Federation.

26 September 2021 1	Büyükçekmece Basketbol	87–95	Galatasaray Nef	Büyükçekmece, Istanbul
13:00	Scoring by quarter: 30–32, 15–19, 26–22, 16–22
	Pts: Crawford 36; Rebs: Gerun 8 Asts: Crawford 8 PIR: Crawford 36	Boxscore	Pts: Trimble 24; Rebs: Kabaca 7 Asts: Bost 7 PIR: Trimble 26	Arena: Gazanfer Bilge Sports Hall; Referees: Mehmet Karabilecen, Alper Özgök, Burak Yılmaz

2 October 2021 2	Galatasaray Nef	101–107(OT)	Darüşşafaka Tekfen	Ataköy, Istanbul
20:15	Scoring by quarter: 13–20, 33–16, 19–22, 14–21, Overtime: 22–28
	Pts: Blackshear 24; Rebs: Blackshear 9 Asts: Bost 9 PIR: Kabaca 29	Boxscore	Pts: Özdemiroğlu 22; Rebs: Olaseni 11; Asts: Caupain 11; PIR: Özdemiroğlu 27	Arena: Sinan Erdem Dome; Referees: Zafer Yılmaz, Ahmet Tatlıcı, Serhat Büker

9 October 2021 3	Petkim Spor	81–95	Galatasaray Nef	Aliağa, İzmir
13:00	Scoring by quarter: 25–27, 18–26, 20–20, 18–22
	Pts: Browne 26; Rebs: Aldridge 16; Asts: Conger 3 PIR: Browne 29	Boxscore	Pts: Blackshear, Akoon-Purcell 20; Rebs: Blackshear 9 Asts: Trimble 8 PIR: Blackshear 25	Arena: Enka Sport Hall; Referees: Mehmet Serdar Ünal, Ali Şakacı, Murat Ciner

16 October 2021 4	Galatasaray Nef	78–85	Bahçeşehir Koleji	Ataköy, Istanbul
18:00	Scoring by quarter: 21–19, 15–21, 22–18, 20–27
	Pts: Trimble 33; Rebs: Blackshear 7 Asts: Trimble 5 PIR: Trimble 33	Boxscore	Pts: Smith 14; Rebs: Savaş 9 Asts: Hall 6 PIR: Savaş 23	Arena: Sinan Erdem Dome; Referees: Yener Yılmaz, Fatih Arslanoğlu, Erhan Gürsel

23 October 2021 5	Anadolu Efes	85–92	Galatasaray Nef	Ataköy, Istanbul
20:15	Scoring by quarter: 27–27, 24–18, 21–26, 13–21
	Pts: Beaubois 22; Rebs: Dunston, Moerman 76; Asts: Larkin 8 PIR: Beaubois 27	Boxscore	Pts: Akoon-Purcell 27; Rebs: Bost 14; Asts: Bost 12; PIR: Bost, Akoon-Purcell 30	Arena: Sinan Erdem Dome; Referees: Kerem Baki, Kaan Büyükçil, Mehmet Ozan Çakar

30 October 2021 6	Galatasaray Nef	99–84	Frutti Extra Bursaspor	Ataköy, Istanbul
18:00	Scoring by quarter: 28–25, 24–15, 22–23, 25–21
	Pts: Trimble 24; Rebs: three players 5 Asts: Bost 10; PIR: Bost 28	Boxscore	Pts: Freeman 24; Rebs: Türen 6 Asts: Andrews, Needham 6 PIR: Andrews, Freeman 21	Arena: Sinan Erdem Dome; Referees: Mehmet Keseratar, Ayşe Nur Yazıcıoğlu, Duhan Köyiçi

6 November 2021 7	Gaziantep Basketbol	74–66	Galatasaray Nef	Gaziantep
13:00	Scoring by quarter: 15–18, 16–9, 16–17, 27–22
	Pts: Doyle 18; Rebs: Kaba 12; Asts: Peterson 7 PIR: Kaba 29	Boxscore	Pts: Trimble 22; Rebs: Blackshear 9 Asts: Bost 3 PIR: Blackshear 22	Arena: Karataş Şahinbey Sport Hall; Referees: Altup Köselerli, Ziya Özorhon, Yiğit Gönültaş

14 November 2021 8	Galatasaray Nef	100–73	Semt77 Yalovaspor	Ataköy, Istanbul
20:15	Scoring by quarter: 19–26, 27–18, 29–18, 25–11
	Pts: Akoon-Purcell 24; Rebs: Blackshear 8 Asts: Bost 11; PIR: Bost 24	Boxscore	Pts: Karaman 17; Rebs: Karaman 8 Asts: four players 4 PIR: Karaman 22	Arena: Sinan Erdem Dome; Referees: Aytuğ Ekti, Can Mavisu, Polat Parlak

20 November 2021 9	Yukatel Merkezefendi Basket	73–89	Galatasaray Nef	Denizli
15:30	Scoring by quarter: 15–17, 15–26, 18–22, 25–24
	Pts: Smith 24; Rebs: Upson 12; Asts: Smith 4 PIR: Smith 21	Boxscore	Pts: Akoon-Purcell 23; Rebs: Blackshear 8 Asts: Bost 6 PIR: Akoon-Purcell 20	Arena: Pamukkale University Arena; Referees: Emin Moğulkoç, Osman Sinan İşgüder, Sinem Tetik

30 November 2021 10	Galatasaray Nef	90–73	Beşiktaş Icrypex	Ataköy, Istanbul
18:30	Scoring by quarter: 20–21, 26–15, 13–21, 31–16
	Pts: Bost 24; Rebs: Bost, 24; Asts: Blackshear, Bost 7 PIR: Bost 36	Boxscore	Pts: Hollis-Jefferson 24; Rebs: Lawson 21; Asts: Whitehead 5 PIR: Lawson 37	Arena: Sinan Erdem Dome; Referees: Mehmet Keseratar, Mehmet Serdar Ünal, Orhan Çağrı Hekimoğlu

3 December 2021 11	Pınar Karşıyaka	73–67	Galatasaray Nef	İzmir
18:00	Scoring by quarter: 17–23, 24–14, 14–15, 18–15
	Pts: Colson 19; Rebs: Colson 12; Asts: Taylor 7 PIR: Colson 24	Boxscore	Pts: Blackshear 21; Rebs: Blackshear 7 Asts: Trimble 5 PIR: Blackshear 24	Arena: Karşıyaka Arena; Referees: Erşan Kartal, Fatih Arslanoğlu, Tolga Edis

11 December 2021 12	Galatasaray Nef	76–86	Fenerbahçe Beko	Ataköy, Istanbul
20:15	Scoring by quarter: 20–24, 15–18, 19–13, 22–31
	Pts: Akoon-Purcell, Bost 19; Rebs: Akoon-Purcell 7 Asts: Trimble 4 PIR: Akoon-Purcell 17	Boxscore	Pts: Mahmutoğlu 22; Rebs: Veselý 12; Asts: Henry 6 PIR: Veselý 20	Arena: Sinan Erdem Dome; Referees: Zafer Yılmaz, Özlem Yalman, Kaan Büyükçil

18 December 2021 13	Galatasaray Nef	124–82	HDI Sigorta Afyon Belediye	Ataköy, Istanbul
13:00	Scoring by quarter: 23–20, 26–22, 37–20, 38–20
	Pts: Akoon-Purcell 29; Rebs: Blackshear 11; Asts: Trimble 9 PIR: Blackshear 32	Boxscore	Pts: Shorter 43; Rebs: Shorter 9 Asts: Diril, Özkapıcı 3 PIR: Shorter 35	Arena: Sinan Erdem Dome; Referees: Duhan Köyiçi, Musa Kazım Çetin, Batuhan Söylemezoğlu

26 December 2021 14	Tofaş	77–88	Galatasaray Nef	Bursa
20:15	Scoring by quarter: 25–23, 15–28, 24–12, 13–25
	Pts: Zubčić 16; Rebs: Zubčić 8 Asts: Uğurlu 9 PIR: Zubčić 19	Boxscore	Pts: Akoon-Purcell 23; Rebs: Kravish 10; Asts: Bost 9 PIR: Kravish 29	Arena: Tofaş Nilüfer Sports Hall; Referees: Mehmet Karabilecen, Osman Sinan İşgüder, Erhan Gürsel

2 January 2022 15	Galatasaray Nef	88–71	Türk Telekom	Ataköy, Istanbul
18:00	Scoring by quarter: 18–20, 26–25, 25–12, 19–14
	Pts: Trimble 27; Rebs: Kravish 9 Asts: Bost 7 PIR: Trimble 24	Boxscore	Pts: Johnson 18; Rebs: Demir, Johnson 6 Asts: Pérez 6 PIR: Johnson 20	Arena: Sinan Erdem Dome; Referees: Yener Yılmaz, Kerem Baki, Hüseyin Çelik

9 January 2022 16	Galatasaray Nef	98–78	Büyükçekmece Basketbol	Ataköy, Istanbul
20:15	Scoring by quarter: 28–24, 22–18, 24–16, 24–20
	Pts: Trimble 21; Rebs: Blackshear 8 Asts: four players 4 PIR: Kravish, Trimble 20	Boxscore	Pts: Miller 13; Rebs: Gerun 9 Asts: Crawford 7 PIR: Gerun 15	Arena: Sinan Erdem Dome; Referees: Mehmet Keseratar, Ali Şakacı, Polat Parlak

15 January 2022 17	Darüşşafaka Tekfen	83–82	Galatasaray Nef	Istanbul
18:00	Scoring by quarter: 18–28, 18–26, 19–15, 28–13
	Pts: Piñeiro 21; Rebs: Boothe 7 Asts: Özdemiroğlu 5 PIR: Piñeiro 21	Boxscore	Pts: Trimble 24; Rebs: Blackshear 5 Asts: Bost 11; PIR: Bost 22	Arena: Ayhan Şahenk Sports Hall; Referees: Aytuğ Ekti, Alper Özgök, Batuhan Söylemezoğlu

22 January 2022 18	Galatasaray Nef	96–73	Petkim Spor	Ataköy, Istanbul
20:15	Scoring by quarter: 24–22, 24–13, 31–19, 17–19
	Pts: Trimble 23; Rebs: Kravish 11; Asts: Bost 8 PIR: Trimble 26	Boxscore	Pts: Armand 20; Rebs: Hamilton 6 Asts: Hamilton 8 PIR: Aldridge, Sayılı 16	Arena: Sinan Erdem Dome; Referees: Fatih Arslanoğlu, Mehmet Ozan Çakar, Özge Şentürk

29 January 2022 19	Bahçeşehir Koleji	94–88	Galatasaray Nef	Istanbul
13:00	Scoring by quarter: 30–27, 21–19, 24–21, 19–21
	Pts: Dekker, Smith 17; Rebs: Yılmaz 13; Asts: Hall 8 PIR: Yılmaz 22	Boxscore	Pts: Trimble 26; Rebs: Bost 8 Asts: Bost 11; PIR: Bost 35	Arena: Ülker Sports and Event Hall; Referees: Emin Moğulkoç, Ziya Özorhon, Serhat Büker

6 February 2022 20	Galatasaray Nef	91–103	Anadolu Efes	Ataköy, Istanbul
15:30	Scoring by quarter: 22–28, 24–21, 28–31, 17–23
	Pts: Trimble 31; Rebs: Bost 10; Asts: Bost 10; PIR: Trimble 30	Boxscore	Pts: Micić 28; Rebs: Pleiß 7 Asts: Larkin 9 PIR: Micić 27	Arena: Sinan Erdem Dome; Referees: Mehmet Keseratar, Mehmet Şahin, Burak Yılmaz

12 February 2022 21	Frutti Extra Bursaspor	99–78	Galatasaray Nef	Bursa
20:15	Scoring by quarter: 25–23, 26–12, 18–25, 30–18
	Pts: Bitim 28; Rebs: Bitim, Hayes 8 Asts: Andrews 8 PIR: Bitim 32	Boxscore	Pts: Blackshear 24; Rebs: Blackshear 9 Asts: Bost 6 PIR: Blackshear 30	Arena: Tofaş Nilüfer Sports Hall; Referees: Mehmet Serdar Ünal, Ali Şakacı, Tolga Edis

5 March 2022 22	Galatasaray Nef	75–74	Gaziantep Basketbol	Ataköy, Istanbul
13:00	Scoring by quarter: 26–14, 17–15, 13–28, 19–17
	Pts: Ndour 16; Rebs: Ndour 11; Asts: Bost 7 PIR: Ndour 25	Boxscore	Pts: Peterson 22; Rebs: Luther 9 Asts: Peterson 4 PIR: Peterson 27	Arena: Sinan Erdem Dome; Referees: Aytuğ Ekti, Fatih Arslanoğlu, Sinem Tetik

6 April 2022 23	Semt77 Yalovaspor	69–73	Galatasaray Nef	Yalova
20:30	Scoring by quarter: 24–14, 17–22, 13–17, 15–20
	Pts: Gallinat 20; Rebs: Tırpancı, Brown 7 Asts: Rupnik 7 PIR: Rupnik 17	Boxscore	Pts: Blackshear 26; Rebs: Blackshear 7 Asts: Bost 7 PIR: Blackshear 29	Arena: 90. Yıl Sports Hall; Referees: Yener Yılmaz, Mehmet Ozan Çakar, Musa Kazım Çetin

20 March 2022 24	Galatasaray Nef	63–76	Yukatel Merkezefendi Basket	Ataköy, Istanbul
15:30	Scoring by quarter: 11–22, 12–11, 23–26, 17–17
	Pts: Kabaca 12; Rebs: Akoon-Purcell 6 Asts: Bost 4 PIR: Köksal 14	Boxscore	Pts: Lomažs 27; Rebs: Hollowell 10; Asts: Lomažs 5 PIR: Lomažs 24	Arena: Sinan Erdem Dome; Referees: Mehmet Keseratar, Ahmet Tatlıcı, Polat Parlak

27 March 2022 25	Beşiktaş Icrypex	62–74	Galatasaray Nef	Istanbul
18:00	Scoring by quarter: 17–14, 21–14, 13–22, 11–24
	Pts: Arna 20; Rebs: Hollis-Jefferson 15; Asts: Hollis-Jefferson 4 PIR: Hollis-Jefferson, Arna 24	Boxscore	Pts: Trimble 28; Rebs: Kravish 9 Asts: Trimble 9 PIR: Trimble 27	Arena: Akatlar Arena; Referees: Erşan Kartal, Hüseyin Çelik, Burak Yılmaz

3 April 2022 26	Galatasaray Nef	84–78	Pınar Karşıyaka	Ataköy, Istanbul
15:30	Scoring by quarter: 21–20, 26–20, 20–17, 17–21
	Pts: Trimble 26; Rebs: Blackshear, Kravish 7 Asts: three players 5 PIR: Trimble 25	Boxscore	Pts: Colson 29; Rebs: Colson 9 Asts: Taylor; PIR: Colson 33	Arena: Sinan Erdem Dome; Referees: Mehmet Şahin, Mehmet Serdar Ünal, Ziya Özorhon

11 April 2022 27	Fenerbahçe Beko	70–76	Galatasaray Nef	Istanbul
20:30	Scoring by quarter: 18–25, 18–13, 20–20, 14–18
	Pts: Akpınar 17; Rebs: Pierre 6 Asts: Henry, Veselý 7 PIR: Veselý 23	Boxscore	Pts: Bost 17; Rebs: Köksal 5 Asts: Bost 9 PIR: Bost 24	Arena: Ülker Sports and Event Hall; Referees: Ali Serkan Emlek, Alper Altuğ Köselerli, Ali Köseoğlu

17 April 2022 28	HDI Sigorta Afyon Belediye	61–95	Galatasaray Nef	Afyonkarahisar
13:00	Scoring by quarter: 16–22, 9–19, 21–21, 15–33
	Pts: Hayes 29; Rebs: Hamilton 7 Asts: Hayes 5 PIR: Hayes 26	Boxscore	Pts: Trimble 15; Rebs: Ndour 7 Asts: three players 4 PIR: Trimble 22	Arena: Prof. Dr. Veysel Eroğlu Sports Hall; Referees: Ahmet Tatlıcı, Sinem Tetik, Polat Parlak

24 April 2022 29	Galatasaray Nef	90–89(OT)	Tofaş	Ataköy, Istanbul
15:30	Scoring by quarter: 13–24, 19–16, 20–20, 26–18, Overtime: 12–11
	Pts: Trimble 19; Rebs: Blackshear 10; Asts: Bost 7 PIR: Blackshear 19	Boxscore	Pts: Cook 19; Rebs: Ennis, Tanışan 6 Asts: Cruz 7 PIR: Cook 20	Arena: Sinan Erdem Dome; Referees: Yener Yılmaz, Erşan Kartal, Umut Özgün Ergün

7 May 2022 30	Türk Telekom	67–97	Galatasaray Nef	Ankara
19:00	Scoring by quarter: 16–23, 19–20, 19–33, 13–21
	Pts: Pérez 22; Rebs: Demir 6 Asts: Pérez 5 PIR: Pérez 22	Boxscore	Pts: Kabaca 16; Rebs: Ndour 6 Asts: Blackshear 4 PIR: Ndour 20	Arena: Ankara Arena; Referees: Alper Altuğ Köselerli, Serhat Büker, Orhan Çağrı Hekimoğlu

==== Playoffs ====
===== Quarterfinals =====
Win Loss

14 May 2022 1	Galatasaray Nef	91–76	Bahçeşehir Koleji	Ataköy, Istanbul
20:30	Scoring by quarter: 30–19, 17–24, 16–16, 27–19
	Pts: Canaan 24; Rebs: Bost 9 Asts: Bost 9 PIR: Bost 33	Boxscore	Pts: Jones 20; Rebs: Baygül 7 Asts: Hall 6 PIR: Jones 19	Arena: Sinan Erdem Dome; Referees: Emin Moğulkoç, Mehmet Serdar Ünal, Orhan Çağrı Hekimoğlu

16 May 2022 2	Bahçeşehir Koleji	94–98	Galatasaray Nef	Istanbul
20:30	Scoring by quarter: 21–25, 18–23, 29–26, 26–24
	Pts: Smith 23; Rebs: Black, Solomon 6 Asts: Hall 12; PIR: Smith 25	Boxscore	Pts: Bost, Kravish 20; Rebs: Kravish 8 Asts: Köksal 6 PIR: Kravish 30	Arena: Ülker Sports and Event Hall; Referees: Serkan Emlek, Fatih Arslanoğlu, Musa Kazım Çetin

===== Semifinals =====
Win Loss

27 May 2022 1	Anadolu Efes	70–105	Galatasaray Nef	Ataköy, Istanbul
20:30	Scoring by quarter: 16–18, 18–25, 17–36, 19–26
	Pts: Güven 15; Rebs: Güven, Pleiß 7 Asts: Micić 4 PIR: Güven 19	Boxscore	Pts: Bost 22; Rebs: Kabaca 10; Asts: Trimble 10; PIR: Bost 23	Arena: Sinan Erdem Dome; Attendance: 16,500; Referees: Aytuğ Ekti, Kerem Baki, Ziya Özorhon

29 May 2022 2	Anadolu Efes	91–77	Galatasaray Nef	Ataköy, Istanbul
19:00	Scoring by quarter: 21–21, 24–16, 26–24, 20–16
	Pts: Micić 19; Rebs: Bryant 6 Asts: Larkin 12; PIR: Larkin 24	Boxscore	Pts: Canaan 14; Rebs: Blackshear 7 Asts: Bost 6 PIR: Blackshear 17	Arena: Sinan Erdem Dome; Attendance: 16,500; Referees: Yener Yılmaz, Can Mavisu, Alper Özgök

31 May 2022 3	Galatasaray Nef	64–71	Anadolu Efes	Ataköy, Istanbul
20:30	Scoring by quarter: 18–15, 12–14, 15–20, 19–22
	Pts: Bost 14; Rebs: Blackshear 13; Asts: Trimble 5 PIR: Blackshear 16	Boxscore	Pts: Dunston 20; Rebs: Pleiß, Bryant 8 Asts: Larkin 10; PIR: Dunston 23	Arena: Sinan Erdem Dome; Attendance: 16,500; Referees: Erşan Kartal, Mehmet Şahin, Serhat Büker

2 June 2022 4	Galatasaray Nef	86–81	Anadolu Efes	Ataköy, Istanbul
20:30	Scoring by quarter: 16–23, 26–20, 24–21, 20–17
	Pts: Bost 20; Rebs: Köksal 7 Asts: Bost 7 PIR: Blackshear 24	Boxscore	Pts: Micić 23; Rebs: Bryant, Dunston 8 Asts: Larkin 5 PIR: Micić 24	Arena: Sinan Erdem Dome; Attendance: 16,500; Referees: Mehmet Karabilecen, Hüseyin Çelik, Mehmet Serdar Ünal

4 June 2022 5	Anadolu Efes	104–77	Galatasaray Nef	Ataköy, Istanbul
19:00	Scoring by quarter: 26–26, 25–16, 30–11, 23–24
	Pts: Larkin 28; Rebs: Bryant 10; Asts: Larkin 6 PIR: Larkin 31	Boxscore	Pts: Ndour 20; Rebs: Ndour 6 Asts: Blackshear 7 PIR: Ndour 25	Arena: Sinan Erdem Dome; Attendance: 16,500; Referees: Yener Yılmaz, Erşan Kartal, Alper Altuğ Köselerli

=== Basketball Champions League ===
==== Regular season ====
Pos	Team	Pld	W	L	PF	PA	PD	Pts	Qualification
1	(Turkey) Galatasaray Nef	6	5	1	525	486	+39	11	Advance to round of 16
2	(Bosnia and Herzegovina) Igokea	6	3	3	460	454	+6	9	Advance to play-ins
3	(Greece) PAOK	6	2	4	442	459	−17	8	Advance to play-ins
4	(Czech Republic) ERA Nymburk	6	2	4	481	509	−28	8	

Source: Groups Standings

==== Regular season matches ====
Win Loss

6 October 2021 RS1	Galatasaray Nef (Turkey)	101–85	(Czech Republic) ERA Nymburk	Ataköy, Istanbul
21:00	Scoring by quarter: 23–26, 29–22, 23–19, 26–18
	Pts: Trimble 33; Rebs: three players 6 Asts: Bost 5 PIR: Trimble 37	Boxscore	Pts: Harding 21; Rebs: Benda 8 Asts: Ross 6 PIR: Harding 15	Arena: Sinan Erdem Dome; Referees: Fernando Calatrava, Luis Castillo, Beniamino Manuel Attard

13 October 2021 RS2	Igokea (Bosnia and Herzegovina)	85–89	(Turkey) Galatasaray Nef	Aleksandrovac
18:30	Scoring by quarter: 17–27, 27–25, 23–16, 18–21
	Pts: Waller 22; Rebs: Ilić 7 Asts: Starks 8 PIR: Waller 18	Boxscore	Pts: Akoon-Purcell 31; Rebs: Blackshear 7 Asts: Akoon-Purcell, Trimble 4 PIR: Akoon-Purcell 35	Arena: Laktaši Sports Hall; Referees: Antonio Conde, Saverio Lanzarini, Sergii Zashchuk

25 October 2021 RS3	PAOK (Greece)	81–74	(Turkey) Galatasaray Nef	Thessaloniki
19:30	Scoring by quarter: 12–24, 21–12, 22–17, 26–21
	Pts: Love 14; Rebs: Jones 11; Asts: Toliopoulos 6 PIR: Jones 21	Boxscore	Pts: Akoon-Purcell 21; Rebs: Kabaca 9 Asts: Bost 7 PIR: Akoon-Purcell 24	Arena: PAOK Sports Arena; Referees: Marius Ciulin, Boris Krejić, Paulo Marques

9 November 2021 RS4	Galatasaray Nef (Turkey)	82–74	(Bosnia and Herzegovina) Igokea	Ataköy, Istanbul
20:00	Scoring by quarter: 15–19, 19–15, 26–25, 22–15
	Pts: Bost 21; Rebs: Kabaca 7 Asts: Bost 7 PIR: Bost 20	Boxscore	Pts: Starks 17; Rebs: Ilić 12; Asts: Starks 4 PIR: Starks, Stephens 15	Arena: Sinan Erdem Dome; Referees: Luis Castillo, Fernando Calatrava, Michal Proc

8 December 2021 RS5	Galatasaray Nef (Turkey)	87–75	(Greece) PAOK	Ataköy, Istanbul
20:00	Scoring by quarter: 28–22, 20–18, 28–18, 11–17
	Pts: Akoon-Purcell 20; Rebs: Akoon-Purcell, Kabaca 6 Asts: Bost 8 PIR: Kabaca 24	Boxscore	Pts: Jones 15; Rebs: Jones 8 Asts: Toliopoulos 6 PIR: Jones 21	Arena: Sinan Erdem Dome; Referees: Aleksandar Glišić, Wojciech Liszka, Martins Kozlovskis

22 December 2021 RS6	ERA Nymburk (Czech Republic)	86–92	(Turkey) Galatasaray Nef	Nymburk
18:30	Scoring by quarter: 22–26, 23–20, 19–29, 22–17
	Pts: Hruban 21; Rebs: Harding 8 Asts: Ross 6 PIR: Hruban 19	Boxscore	Pts: Akoon-Purcell 20; Rebs: Akoon-Purcell 7 Asts: Bost, Trimble 6 PIR: Akoon-Purcell 25	Arena: Královka Arena; Referees: Antonio Conde, Gvidas Gedvilas, Gatis Saliņš

==== Round of 16 ====
Pos	Team	Pld	W	L	PF	PA	PD	Pts	Qualification
1	(Israel) Hapoel Holon	6	4	2	465	443	+22	10	Advance to quarter-finals
2	(Germany) MHP Riesen Ludwigsburg	6	4	2	438	414	+24	10	Advance to quarter-finals
3	(France) JDA Dijon	6	3	3	461	476	−15	9	
4	(Turkey) Galatasaray Nef	6	1	5	433	464	−31	7	

Source: Round of 16 Standings

==== Round of 16 Matches ====
Win Loss

10 March 2022 R16-1	Galatasaray Nef (Turkey)	74–71	(Israel) Hapoel Holon	Ataköy, Istanbul
20:00	Scoring by quarter: 29–16, 11–14, 16–22, 18–19
	Pts: Blackshear 24; Rebs: Kravish 7 Asts: Bost 5 PIR: Akoon-Purcell 23	Boxscore	Pts: Kyser 16; Rebs: Johnson 7 Asts: Ragland 8 PIR: Kyser 18	Arena: Sinan Erdem Dome; Referees: Georgios Poursanidis (Greece), Nicolas Maestre (France), Lorenzo Baldini (Italy)

14 March 2022 R16-2	MHP Riesen Ludwigsburg (Germany)	76–71(OT)	(Turkey) Galatasaray Nef	Ludwigsburg
22:00	Scoring by quarter: 17–13, 19–18, 17–14, 13–21, Overtime: 10–5
	Pts: Radebaugh 17; Rebs: Polas Bartolo 9 Asts: Hulls, Alkins 4 PIR: Radebaugh 22	Boxscore	Pts: Trimble 21; Rebs: Akoon-Purcell 8 Asts: Trimble, Akoon-Purcell 3 PIR: Trimble 14	Arena: MHP Arena; Referees: Manuel Mazzoni (Italy), Tomas Jasevičius (Lithuania), Dariusz Zapolski (Poland)

9 February 2022 R16-3	Galatasaray Nef (Turkey)	72–75	(France) JDA Dijon	Ataköy, Istanbul
18:00	Scoring by quarter: 16–24, 25–14, 18–17, 13–20
	Pts: Kravish 15; Rebs: Kravish 18; Asts: Bost 4 PIR: Kravish 25	Boxscore	Pts: Holston 18; Rebs: Kelly 9 Asts: Holston 10; PIR: Holston 18	Arena: Sinan Erdem Dome; Referees: Oskars Lūcis, Luis Castillo, Péter Praksch

8 March 2022 R16-4	Hapoel Holon (Israel)	98–89	(Turkey) Galatasaray Nef	Holon
20:30	Scoring by quarter: 20–25, 23–21, 27–24, 28–19
	Pts: Johnson 26; Rebs: Johnson 8 Asts: Ragland 8 PIR: Johnson 33	Boxscore	Pts: Bost 21; Rebs: Akoon-Purcell 11; Asts: Bost 6 PIR: Bost 27	Arena: Holon Toto Hall; Referees: Antonio Conde, Aleksandar Glišić, Geert Jacobs

16 March 2022 R16-5	JDA Dijon (France)	80–69	(Turkey) Galatasaray Nef	Dijon
22:30	Scoring by quarter: 16–22, 29–24, 14–13, 21–10
	Pts: Holston 23; Rebs: Kelly 7 Asts: Holston, Kelly 4 PIR: Holston 25	Boxscore	Pts: Ndour 24; Rebs: Ndour 7 Asts: Bost 9 PIR: Ndour 30	Arena: Palais des Sports Jean-Michel Geoffroy; Referees: Luis Castillo (Spain), Martin Horozov (Bulgaria), Beniamino Manuel Attard (Italy)

23 March 2022 R16-6	Galatasaray Nef (Turkey)	58–64	(Germany) MHP Riesen Ludwigsburg	Ataköy, Istanbul
20:00	Scoring by quarter: 16–11, 16–21, 10–14, 16–18
	Pts: Blackshear 17; Rebs: Blackshear 10; Asts: Bost 5 PIR: Blackshear 15	Boxscore	Pts: Simon 18; Rebs: Simon 14; Asts: Cotton 3 PIR: Simon 27	Arena: Sinan Erdem Dome; Referees: Saverio Lanzarini (Italy), Fernando Calatrava (Spain), Ivor Matejek (Czech Republic)

=== Turkish Basketball Cup ===
==== Quarterfinals ====
15 February 2022 QF	Gaziantep Basketbol	62–77	Galatasaray Nef	Gaziantep
18:00 TRT (UTC +3)	Scoring by quarter: 14–19, 17–17, 18–18, 13–23
Tivibuspor	Pts: Kaba 18; Rebs: Kaba 12; Asts: Doyle 6 PIR: Kaba 29	Report	Pts: Bost 20; Rebs: Blackshear 6 Asts: Bost, Ulubay 3 PIR: Bost 23	Arena: Karataş Şahinbey Sport Hall; Referees: Erşan Kartal, Fatih Arslanoğlu, Musa Kazım Çetin

==== Semifinals ====
18 February 2022 SF	Fenerbahçe Beko	64–49	Galatasaray Nef	Bursa
18:00	Scoring by quarter: 20–18, 16–13, 12–8, 16–10
Tivibuspor	Pts: Gudurić 20; Rebs: Pierre 11; Asts: Henry 7 PIR: Gudurić 21	Report	Pts: Trimble 19; Rebs: Akoon-Purcell 7 Asts: Bost 10; PIR: Blackshear 18	Arena: Tofaş Nilüfer Spor Salonu; Referees: Emin Moğulkoç, Kerem Baki, Can Mavisu
