= 2022 Turkish Basketball Cup =

- Season: 2021–22
- Duration: 15–20 February 2022
- Games played: 7
- Teams: 8
- TV partner: Tivibuspor

Finals
- Champions: Anadolu Efes (12th title)
- Runners-up: Fenerbahçe Beko

Awards
- Final MVP: (Germany) Tibor Pleiß

The 2022 Turkish Basketball Cup (Turkish: 2022 Basketbol Erkekler Türkiye Kupası), also known as Bitci Erkekler Türkiye Kupası for sponsorship reasons, was the 36th edition of Turkey's top-tier level professional national domestic basketball cup competition. The quarterfinals of tournament were held from 15 to 16 February 2022 in 4 different locations and then semi-finals and the final were held from 18 to 20 February 2022 in the Tofaş Nilüfer Spor Salonu in Bursa, Turkey. Anadolu Efes won the competition by defeating Fenerbahçe Beko 86–72 in the final.

== Qualified teams ==
The top eight placed teams after the first half of the top-tier level Basketball Super League 2021–22 season qualified for the tournament. The four highest-placed teams played against the lowest-seeded teams in the quarter-finals. The competition was played under a single elimination format.

Pos	Team	Pld	W	L	PF	PA	PD	Pts	Seeding
1	Fenerbahçe Beko	15	14	1	1264	1045	+219	29	Seeded
2	Anadolu Efes	15	12	3	1373	1208	+165	27	Seeded
3	Darüşşafaka Tekfen	15	11	4	1184	1085	+99	26	Seeded
4	Galatasaray Nef	15	10	5	1348	1211	+137	25	Seeded
5	Pınar Karşıyaka	15	10	5	1183	1111	+72	25	Unseeded
6	Bahçeşehir Koleji	15	9	6	1307	1204	+103	24	Unseeded
7	Gaziantep Basketbol	15	9	6	1198	1152	+46	24	Unseeded
8	Tofaş	15	8	7	1292	1224	+68	23	Unseeded

Source: Basketbol Süper Ligi

== Draw ==
The 2022 Turkish Basketball Cup was drawn on 7 February 2022. The seeded teams were paired in the quarterfinals with the non-seeded teams.

== Bracket ==
Quarterfinals; February 15–16
1	Fenerbahçe Beko	93
8	Tofaş	88
7	Gaziantep Basketbol	62
4	Galatasaray Nef	77
2	Anadolu Efes	87
5	Pınar Karşıyaka	64
6	Bahçeşehir Koleji	80
3	Darüşşafaka Tekfen	86

Semifinals; February 18
1	Fenerbahçe Beko	64
4	Galatasaray Nef	49
2	Anadolu Efes	96
3	Darüşşafaka Tekfen	71

Final; February 20
1	Fenerbahçe Beko	72
2	Anadolu Efes	86

== Quarterfinals ==
15 February 2022	Gaziantep Basketbol	62–77	Galatasaray Nef	Gaziantep
18:00 TRT (UTC +3)	Scoring by quarter: 14–19, 17–17, 18–18, 13–23
Tivibuspor	Pts: Kaba 18; Rebs: Kaba 12; Asts: Doyle 6 PIR: Kaba 29	Report	Pts: Bost 20; Rebs: Blackshear 6 Asts: Bost, Ulubay 3 PIR: Bost 23	Arena: Karataş Şahinbey Sport Hall; Referees: Erşan Kartal, Fatih Arslanoğlu, Musa Kazım Çetin

15 February 2022	Tofaş	88–93(OT)	Fenerbahçe Beko	Bursa
20:30 TRT (UTC +3)	Scoring by quarter: 25 –16, 23 –21, 16 –15, 12– 24, Overtime: 12– 17
Tivibuspor	Pts: Cook 20; Rebs: Cook, Ennis 7 Asts: Uğurlu 6 PIR: Cook 22	Report	Pts: Mahmutoğlu 27; Rebs: Polonara 9 Asts: Henry 6 PIR: Mahmutoğlu 21	Arena: Tofaş Nilüfer Sports Hall; Referees: Mehmet Şahin, Altuğ Köselerli, Kaan Büyükçil

16 February 2022	Bahçeşehir Koleji	80–88	Darüşşafaka Tekfen	Istanbul
18:00 TRT (UTC +3)	Scoring by quarter: 15–24, 18–17, 22–25, 25–22
Tivibuspor	Pts: Dekker, Smith 16; Rebs: Dekker 6 Asts: Özmızrak, Smith 6 PIR: Dekker 20	Report	Pts: Caupain, Piñeiro 18; Rebs: Caupain, Özdemiroğlu 6 Asts: Caupain 8 PIR: Caupain 29	Arena: Ülker Sports Arena; Referees: Mehmet Keseratar, Mehmet Serdar Ünal, Ziya Özorhon

16 February 2022	Anadolu Efes	87–64	Pınar Karşıyaka	Istanbul
20:30 TRT (UTC +3)	Scoring by quarter: 25–12, 31–17, 21–17, 10–18
Tivibuspor	Pts: Pleiß 20; Rebs: Pleiß 7 Asts: three players 5 PIR: Pleiß 27	Report	Pts: M'Baye 21; Rebs: Colson 13; Asts: Korkmaz, Tyus 4 PIR: Colson 23	Arena: Sinan Erdem Dome; Referees: Özlem Yalman, Mehmet Karabilecen, Orhan Çağrı Hekimoğlu

== Semifinals ==
18 February 2022	Fenerbahçe Beko	64–49	Galatasaray Nef	Bursa
18:00 TRT (UTC +3)	Scoring by quarter: 20–18, 16–13, 12–8, 16–10
Tivibuspor	Pts: Gudurić 20; Rebs: Pierre 9 Asts: Henry 4 PIR: Gudurić 21	Report	Pts: Trimble 16; Rebs: Akoon-Purcell 6 Asts: Bost 7 PIR: Blackshear 13	Arena: Tofaş Nilüfer Spor Salonu; Referees: Emin Moğulkoç, Kerem Baki, Can Mavisu

18 February 2022	Anadolu Efes	96–71	Darüşşafaka Tekfen	Bursa
21:00 TRT (UTC +3)	Scoring by quarter: 28–15, 26–17, 25–15, 17–24
Tivibuspor	Pts: Bryant 26; Rebs: Bryant 6 Asts: Micić 5 PIR: Bryant 29	Report	Pts: Piñeiro 14; Rebs: four players 6 Asts: Caupain 9 PIR: Piñeiro 17	Arena: Tofaş Nilüfer Spor Salonu; Referees: Aytuğ Ekti, Zafer Yılmaz, Hüseyin Çelik

== Final ==
20 February 2022	Fenerbahçe Beko	72–86	Anadolu Efes	Bursa
17:00 TRT (UTC +3)	Scoring by quarter: 14–16, 13–25, 22–21, 23–24
Tivibuspor	Pts: Booker 17; Rebs: Booker 5 Asts: Starks 5 PIR: Booker 20	Report	Pts: Micić 23; Rebs: Moerman 16; Asts: Larkin 7 PIR: Pleiß 25	Arena: Tofaş Nilüfer Spor Salonu; Referees: Aytuğ Ekti, Can Mavisu, Hüseyin Çelik

Starters:			Pts	Reb	Ast
PG	11	(United States) Markel Starks	10	0	5
SG	10	(Turkey) Melih Mahmutoğlu	10	3	0
SF	13	(Turkey) Tarik Biberovic	0	0	0
PF	31	(United States) Devin Booker	17	5	3
C	25	(United States) Jehyve Floyd	10	2	1
Reserves:					
PF	1	(Turkey) Metecan Birsen	0	1	0
SG	2	(Turkey) Şehmus Hazer	6	3	2
G	5	(Germany) İsmet Akpınar	0	0	0
SG	8	(Turkey) Ekrem Sancaklı	DNP		
F	21	(Canada) Dyshawn Pierre	2	4	2
G/F	23	(Serbia) Marko Gudurić	15	1	1
C	44	(Jordan) Ahmet Düverioğlu	2	1	1
Head coach:
(Serbia) Aleksandar Đorđević

Fenerbahçe	Anadolu Efes

Fenerbahçe	Statistics	A. Efes
22/37 (59.5%)	2-point field goals	17/24 (70.8%)
8/24 (33.3%)	3-point field goals	12/32 (37.5%)
4/6 (66.7%)	Free throws	16/18 (88.9%)
8	Offensive rebounds	12
13	Defensive rebounds	25
21	Total rebounds	37
15	Assists	16
5	Steals	3
9	Turnovers	11
1	Blocks	1

Starters:			Pts	Reb	Ast
PG	22	(Serbia) Vasilije Micić	23	1	6
SG	1	(France) Rodrigue Beaubois	19	3	1
SF	44	(Croatia) Krunoslav Simon	2	5	0
PF	18	(France) Adrien Moerman	13	16	1
C	21	(Germany) Tibor Pleiß	20	8	0
Reserves:					
PG	0	(Turkey) Shane Larkin	6	1	7
F	3	(Turkey) Yiğitcan Saybir	2	1	0
PG	4	(Turkey) Doğuş Balbay	DNP		
G	10	(Turkey) Ömercan İlyasoğlu	0	0	0
G	11	(Turkey) Erten Gazi	1	1	0
C	15	(Turkey) Egemen Güven	0	0	1
G	19	(Turkey) Buğrahan Tuncer	DNP		
Head coach:
(Turkey) Ergin Ataman

2022 Turkish Cup Winners
Anadolu Efes
(12th title)

== See also ==
- 2021–22 Basketbol Süper Ligi
