= 2021–22 Basketbol Süper Ligi =

Basketball league in Turkey

Basketbol Süper Ligi
- Season: 2021–22
- Dates: 25 September 2021 – 13 June 2022
- Games played: 264
- Teams: 16
- TV partners: Tivibu & TRT Spor

Regular season
- Top seed: Fenerbahçe Beko
- Season MVP: (Guinea) Alpha Kaba
- Relegated: HDI Sigorta Afyon Belediye; Semt77 Yalovaspor

Finals
- Champions: Fenerbahçe Beko (10th title)
- Runners-up: Anadolu Efes
- Semifinalists: Darüşşafaka; Galatasaray Nef
- Finals MVP: (Czech Republic) Jan Veselý

Statistical leaders
Points	(United States) Jarmar Gulley	21.0
Rebounds	(Guinea) Alpha Kaba	10.8
Assists	(Slovenia) Luka Rupnik	8.1
Index Rating	(Guinea) Alpha Kaba	20.0

Records
- Biggest home win: Tofaş 145–55 HDI Sigorta Afyon Belediye (2 January 2022)
- Biggest away win: HDI Sigorta Afyon Belediye 83–140 Anadolu Efes (11 December 2021)
- Highest scoring: HDI Sigorta Afyon Belediye 83–140 Anadolu Efes (11 December 2021)
- Winning streak: 9 games Fenerbahçe Beko
- Losing streak: 12 games Büyükçekmece Basketbol; HDI Sigorta Afyon Belediye

The 2021–22 Basketbol Süper Ligi was the 56th season of the Basketball Super League (Turkish: Basketbol Süper Ligi), the top-level professional club men's basketball league in Turkey.

== Teams ==
On 2 May 2021, Merkezefendi Bld. Denizli Basket was promoted to the BSL as the champion of the Turkish Basketball First League. It will be their first season in the BSL. Semt77 Yalovaspor promoted to the BSL for the first time in club history as winners of the TBL play-offs.

OGM Ormanspor and Lokman Hekim Fethiye Belediyespor were relegated after finishing in the last two spots for 2020–21 Basketbol Süper Ligi.

=== Venues ===
Locations of the 2021–22 Basketbol Süper Ligi clubs
Istanbul Basketbol Süper Ligi clubs

Team	Home city	Stadium	Capacity
Anadolu Efes	Istanbul	Sinan Erdem Dome	16,000
Bahçeşehir Koleji	Istanbul	Ülker Sports Arena	13,800
Beşiktaş Icrypex	Istanbul	Akatlar Arena	3,200
Büyükçekmece Basketbol	Istanbul	Gazanfer Bilge Spor Salonu	3,000
Darüşşafaka	Istanbul	Volkswagen Arena Istanbul	5,000
Fenerbahçe Beko	Istanbul	Ülker Sports Arena	13,800
Frutti Extra Bursaspor	Bursa	Tofaş Nilüfer Sports Hall	7,500
Galatasaray Nef	Istanbul	Sinan Erdem Dome	16,000
Gaziantep Basketbol	Gaziantep	Karataş Şahinbey Sport Hall	6,400
HDI Sigorta Afyon Belediye	Afyonkarahisar	Prof. Dr. Veysel Eroğlu Spor Salonu	2,800
Petkim Spor	İzmir	Aliağa Belediyesi ENKA Spor Salonu	3,000
Pınar Karşıyaka	İzmir	Karşıyaka Arena	5,000
Semt77 Yalovaspor	Yalova	Yalova 90. Yıl Spor Salonu	2,000
Tofaş	Bursa	Tofaş Nilüfer Sports Hall	7,500
Türk Telekom	Ankara	Ankara Arena	10,400
Yukatel Merkezefendi Basket	Denizli	Pamukkale University Arena	3,490

=== Personnel and sponsorship ===
Team	Head coach	Captain	Kit manufacturer	Main shirt sponsor
Anadolu Efes	(Turkey) Ergin Ataman	(Turkey) Doğuş Balbay	Bilcee	Anadolu Efes
Bahçeşehir Koleji	(Turkey) Erhan Ernak	(Turkey) Oğuz Savaş	Playoff	Bahçeşehir Koleji
Beşiktaş Icrypex	(Turkey) Ahmet Kandemir	(Turkey) Mehmet Yağmur	Upon	Icrypex
Büyükçekmece Basketbol	(Turkey) Özhan Çıvgın	(Turkey) Caner Erdeniz	Dafron	N/A
Darüşşafaka	(Turkey) Selçuk Ernak	(Turkey) Doğuş Özdemiroğlu	New Balance	bitexen
Fenerbahçe Beko	(Serbia) Aleksandar Đorđević	(Turkey) Melih Mahmutoğlu	Fenerium (Club manufactured kit)	Beko
Frutti Extra Bursaspor	(Serbia) Dušan Alimpijević	(Turkey) Birkan Batuk	Kappa	Uludağ Frutti Extra
Galatasaray Nef	(Greece) Andreas Pistiolis	(Turkey) Göksenin Köksal	GSStore (Club manufactured kit)	NEF
Gaziantep Basketbol	(Turkey) Tutku Açık	(Azerbaijan) Orhan Aydın	Dafron	N/A
HDI Sigorta Afyon Belediye	(Turkey) Korhan Aydanarığ	(United States) Kenny Hayes	Barex	HDI Sigorta
Petkim Spor	(Turkey) Burak Gören	(Turkey) Nusret Yıldırım	Barex	Petkim
Pınar Karşıyaka	(Turkey) Ufuk Sarıca	(Turkey) Semih Erden	S by Sportive	Pınar
Semt77 Yalovaspor	(Turkey) Gökhan Güney	(Turkey) Kerem Gülmez	NDRSports	Semt77
Tofaş	(Turkey) Ahmet Çakı	(Turkey) Berk Uğurlu	Dafron	Fiat
Türk Telekom	(Germany) Henrik Rödl	(Turkey) Samet Geyik	Dafron	Türk Telekom
Yukatel Merkezefendi Basket	(Turkey) Zafer Aktaş	(Turkey) Hakan Yapar	Geges	Yukatel

=== Head coaching changes ===
Team	Outgoing manager	Manner of departure	Date of vacancy	Position in table	Replaced with	Date of appointment
Petkim Spor	(Lithuania) Kęstutis Kemzūra	Mutual consent	13 May 2021	Pre-season	(Turkey) Can Sevim	25 May 2021
HDI Sigorta Afyon Belediye	(Turkey) Can Sevim	Mutual consent	25 May 2021	Pre-season	(Turkey) Faruk Beşok	19 July 2021
Gaziantep Basketbol	(Bosnia and Herzegovina) Nenad Marković	Mutual consent	10 June 2021	Pre-season	(Turkey) Tutku Açık	23 June 2021
Fenerbahçe Beko	(Serbia) Igor Kokoškov	Parted ways	27 July 2021	Pre-season	(Serbia) Aleksandar Đorđević	31 June 2021
Tofaş	(Turkey) Hakan Demir	Parted ways	16 November 2021	8th (4–4)	(Turkey) Ahmet Çakı	26 November 2021
Türk Telekom	(Turkey) Burak Gören	Parted ways	1 December 2021	11th (3–7)	(Germany) Henrik Rödl	14 December 2021
HDI Sigorta Afyon Belediye	(Turkey) Faruk Beşok	Parted ways	11 December 2021	14th (3–7)	(Turkey) Serhat Şehit	4 January 2022
Petkim Spor	(Turkey) Can Sevim	Parted ways	29 December 2021	15th (2–12)	(Turkey) Burak Gören	30 December 2021
Semt77 Yalovaspor	(Turkey) Hakan Yavuz	Role Change to Basketball Coordinator of Club	2 January 2022	14th (4–10)	(Turkey) Gökhan Güney	2 January 2022
HDI Sigorta Afyon Belediye	(Turkey) Serhat Şehit	Parted ways	18 January 2022	14th (3–14)	(Turkey) Korhan Aydanarığ	19 January 2022
Galatasaray Nef	(Turkey) Ekrem Memnun	Parted ways	18 March 2022	7th (13–9)	(Greece) Andreas Pistiolis	19 March 2022

== Regular season ==
=== League table ===
Pos	Team	Pld	W	L	PF	PA	PD	Pts	Qualification or relegation
1	Fenerbahçe Beko	30	24	6	2527	2209	+318	54	Advance to playoffs
2	Anadolu Efes	30	23	7	2699	2405	+294	53	Advance to playoffs
3	Galatasaray Nef	30	20	10	2608	2387	+221	50	Advance to playoffs
4	Gaziantep Basketbol	30	19	11	2414	2276	+138	49	Advance to playoffs
5	Darüşşafaka	30	19	11	2372	2218	+154	49	Advance to playoffs
6	Bahçeşehir Koleji	30	18	12	2592	2459	+133	48	Advance to playoffs
7	Pınar Karşıyaka	30	18	12	2403	2300	+103	48	Advance to playoffs
8	Frutti Extra Bursaspor	30	18	12	2519	2332	+187	48	Advance to playoffs
9	Tofaş	30	16	14	2592	2450	+142	46	
10	Beşiktaş Icrypex	30	15	15	2306	2283	+23	45	
11	Türk Telekom	30	12	18	2263	2313	−50	42	
12	Büyükçekmece Basketbol	30	10	20	2397	2592	−195	40	
13	Petkim Spor	30	9	21	2336	2528	−192	39	
14	Yukatel Merkezefendi Basket	30	8	22	2307	2570	−263	38	
15	Semt77 Yalovaspor (R)	30	7	23	2245	2442	−197	37	Relegation to TBL
16	HDI Sigorta Afyon Belediye (R)	30	4	26	2105	2921	−816	34	Relegation to TBL

Source: Basketbol Süper Ligi
(R) Relegated

=== Positions by round ===
Team ╲ Round	1	2	3	4	5	6	7	8	9	10	11	12	13	14	15	16	17	18	19	20	21	22	23	24	25	26	27	28	29	30
Fenerbahçe Beko	2	3	2	1	2	2	1	1	1	1	1	1	1	1	1	2	2	1	1	1	1	1	1	1	1	1	1	1	1	1
Anadolu Efes	6	1	1	4	5	4	4	3	3	2	2	2	2	2	2	6	6	5	3	2	2	2	3	2	2	2	2	2	2	2
Galatasaray Nef	4	7	5	8	6	5	5	5	5	4	5	6	5	5	4	4	5	6	5	7	7	7	8	7	7	7	5	5	5	3
Gaziantep Basketbol	11	6	4	3	4	7	6	6	6	6	6	5	6	6	7	5	4	4	2	4	5	6	5	5	3	3	3	4	4	4
Darüşşafaka	15	11	6	10	7	3	3	2	4	3	3	3	3	3	3	1	1	2	4	3	3	3	2	3	4	4	4	3	3	5
Bahçeşehir Koleji	3	9	10	9	10	9	9	10	9	8	8	8	7	7	6	9	8	8	8	5	6	5	7	6	9	9	9	7	6	6
Pınar Karşıyaka	1	2	3	2	1	1	2	4	2	5	4	4	4	4	5	3	3	3	7	6	4	4	4	4	5	5	6	6	7	7
Frutti Extra Bursaspor	7	10	11	13	11	13	10	11	10	10	9	10	11	10	10	10	10	11	11	11	11	11	10	10	10	10	10	10	8	8
Tofaş	5	4	7	5	3	6	7	8	8	7	7	7	9	9	8	7	7	7	6	8	8	8	9	8	6	6	7	8	9	9
Beşiktaş Icrypex	14	16	15	15	14	8	8	7	7	9	10	9	8	8	9	8	9	10	10	9	10	9	6	9	8	8	8	9	10	10
Türk Telekom	12	5	9	7	9	11	12	9	11	11	11	11	10	11	11	11	11	9	9	10	9	10	11	11	11	11	11	11	11	11
Büyükçekmece Basketbol	13	14	12	12	15	12	11	12	12	13	13	13	14	14	14	15	15	15	14	15	14	14	14	15	13	13	12	12	12	12
Petkim Spor	16	15	16	16	16	16	16	16	16	16	16	16	16	16	16	16	14	16	16	16	16	16	16	14	14	14	15	14	14	13
Yukatel Merkezefendi Basket	9	8	14	14	13	14	14	15	15	15	15	14	13	12	12	12	12	13	13	14	13	13	12	12	12	12	14	13	13	14
Semt77 Yalovaspor	10	13	8	6	8	10	13	14	14	12	12	12	12	13	13	14	16	12	12	12	12	12	13	13	15	15	13	15	15	15
HDI Sigorta Afyon Belediye	8	12	13	11	12	15	15	13	13	14	14	15	15	15	15	13	13	14	15	13	15	15	15	16	16	16	16	16	16	16

Leader
Advance to the playoffs
Relegated

Source: Basketbol Süper Ligi

=== Results ===
Home \ Away	AEF	BAH	BJK	BÇB	DSK	FEN	BUR	GAL	GAZ	AFY	PET	KSK	YAL	TOF	TTA	MEB
Anadolu Efes	—	95–88	87–72	89–90	84–76	91–71	88–85	85–92	83–93	90–68	97–83	78–77	93–87	84–77	79–66	94–93
Bahçeşehir Koleji	83–102	—	86–77	87–91	82–73	78–79	101–80	94–88	82–74	105–77	94–69	104–99	102–79	73–84	69–86	101–95
Beşiktaş Icrypex	55–101	82–69	—	86–67	81–75	74–82	86–80	62–74	68–70	68–48	94–73	77–71	94–85	82–83	73–67	74–62
Büyükçekmece Basketbol	71–96	81–95	93–87	—	67–92	88–96	70–91	87–95	89–93	88–76	81–66	78–92	92–90	87–89	81–71	85–90
Darüşşafaka	85–81	68–66	76–73	86–69	—	65–75	79–75	83–82	71–76	79–73	101–86	80–84	74–62	94–78	66–75	76–62
Fenerbahçe Beko	90–68	84–73	90–81	90–65	61–79	—	99–96	70–76	102–80	100–51	71–63	91–69	89–63	82–72	92–63	85–77
Frutti Extra Bursaspor	79–83	80–78	73–76	85–83	83–81	84–73	—	99–78	85–82	94–59	81–75	84–77	86–85	87–75	101–65	90–67
Galatasaray Nef	91–103	78–85	90–73	98–78	101–107	76–86	99–84	—	75–74	124–82	96–73	84–78	100–73	90–89	88–71	63–76
Gaziantep Basketbol	78–69	69–76	82–77	80–72	69–71	70–86	67–75	74–66	—	85–86	89–85	67–76	81–54	108–92	83–72	82–49
HDI Sigorta Afyon Belediye	83–140	82–102	66–86	76–66	64–115	61–99	55–108	61–95	63–100	—	91–70	67–94	73–106	57–115	61–80	92–83
Petkim Spor	82–92	79–70	87–80	72–74	57–76	95–90	70–68	81–95	80–84	109–87	—	59–92	81–80	83–91	71–59	70–89
Pınar Karşıyaka	78–73	90–81	67–79	70–78	79–82	74–72	76–62	73–67	84–76	90–76	91–79	—	79–73	79–78	71–76	83–85
Semt77 Yalovaspor	69–88	77–84	68–74	80–68	59–82	60–86	65–81	69–73	89–93	63–51	65–92	80–87	—	77–79	72–68	82–76
Tofaş	94–107	78–96	81–80	98–87	81–65	78–82	83–90	77–88	70–89	145–55	97–83	69–71	75–66	—	95–93	97–77
Türk Telekom	84–99	74–75	54–64	86–62	59–46	63–72	83–82	67–97	65–66	135–85	75–70	72–71	68–80	72–74	—	94–72
Yukatel Merkezefendi Basket	65–80	89–113	76–71	90–109	74–69	76–82	74–71	73–89	64–80	87–79	78–93	73–81	73–87	66–98	96–100	—

Source: bsl.org
Legend: Blue = home team win; Red = away team win.
Matches with lighter background shading were decided after overtime.

== Playoffs ==
Quarterfinals were played best-of-three format (1–1–1), semifinals and finals were played in a best-of-five format (2–2–1).

=== Bracket ===
Quarterfinals
1	Fenerbahçe Beko	2
8	Frutti Extra Bursaspor	1
4	Gaziantep Basketbol	1
5	Darüşşafaka	2
2	Anadolu Efes	2
7	Pınar Karşıyaka	1
3	Galatasaray Nef	2
6	Bahçeşehir Koleji	0

Semifinals
1	Fenerbahçe Beko	3
5	Darüşşafaka	1
2	Anadolu Efes	3
3	Galatasaray Nef	2

Finals
1	Fenerbahçe Beko	3
2	Anadolu Efes	1

=== Quarterfinals ===
Team 1	Series	Team 2	Game 1	Game 2	Game 3
Fenerbahçe Beko	2–1	Frutti Extra Bursaspor	100–87	77–97	93–81
Anadolu Efes	2–1	Pınar Karşıyaka	90–66	73–79	83–68
Galatasaray Nef	2–0	Bahçeşehir Koleji	91–76	98–94	—
Gaziantep Basketbol	1–2	Darüşşafaka	82–85	91–66	73–82

=== Semifinals ===
Team 1	Series	Team 2	Game 1	Game 2	Game 3	Game 4	Game 5
Fenerbahçe Beko	3–1	Darüşşafaka	94–69	81–82	73–69	91–65	—
Anadolu Efes	3–2	Galatasaray Nef	70–105	91–77	71–64	81–86	104–77

=== Finals ===
Team 1	Series	Team 2	Game 1	Game 2	Game 3	Game 4	Game 5
Fenerbahçe Beko	3–1	Anadolu Efes	85–76	93–78	92–103	92–80	—

== Statistical leaders ==
=== Efficiency ===
Pos	Player	Club	PIR
1	(Guinea) Alpha Kaba	Gaziantep Basketbol	20.00
2	(United States) Malcolm Thomas	Petkim Spor	19.68
3	(United States) Bonzie Colson	Pınar Karşıyaka	19.10
4	(Serbia) Vasilije Micić	Anadolu Efes	18.88
5	(United States) Jarmar Gulley	Gaziantep Basketbol	18.81

=== Points ===
Pos	Player	Club	PPG
1	(United States) Jarmar Gulley	Gaziantep Basketbol	19.96
2	(Serbia) Vasilije Micić	Anadolu Efes	18.69
3	(United States) Melo Trimble	Galatasaray Nef	17.93
4	(United States) QJ Peterson	Gaziantep Basketbol	17.83
5	(United States) Jordon Crawford	Büyükçekmece Basketbol	17.00

=== Rebounds ===
Pos	Player	Club	RPG
1	(Guinea) Alpha Kaba	Gaziantep Basketbol	10.75
2	(Ukraine) Volodymyr Gerun	Büyükçekmece Basketbol	7.92
3	(United States) Malcolm Thomas	Petkim Spor	7.84
4	(United States) Dedric Lawson	Beşiktaş Icrypex	7.52
5	(United States) Evan Bruinsma	Büyükçekmece Basketbol	7.50

=== Assists ===
Pos	Player	Club	APG
1	(Slovenia) Luka Rupnik	Semt77 Yalovaspor	8.05
2	(Turkey) Kenan Sipahi	Beşiktaş Icrypex	7.50
3	(Bulgaria) Dee Bost	Galatasaray Nef	7.07
4	(United States) Jordon Crawford	Büyükçekmece Basketbol	6.81
5	(Mexico) Alex Pérez	Türk Telekom	6.46

Source: BSL Stats

== Awards ==
All official awards of the 2021–22 Basketbol Süper Ligi.

=== Season awards ===
Award	Player	Team	Ref.
Regular Season MVP	(Guinea) Alpha Kaba	Gaziantep Basketbol	
Finals MVP	(Czech Republic) Jan Veselý	Fenerbahçe Beko	

=== MVP of the Round ===
Gameday	Player	Team	EFF	Ref.
1	(Ghana) Ben Bentil	Bahçeşehir Koleji	28	
2	(United States) Bonzie Colson	Pınar Karşıyaka	42	
3	(United Kingdom) Gabriel Olaseni	Darüşşafaka	27	
4	(Mexico) Pako Cruz	Tofaş	35	
5	(United States) Justin Wright-Foreman	Petkim Spor	31	
6	(Serbia) Vasilije Micić	Anadolu Efes	42	
7	(United States) Jordon Crawford	Büyükçekmece Basketbol	30	
8	(United States) Dedric Lawson	Beşiktaş Icrypex	34	
9	(United States) Allerik Freeman	Frutti Extra Bursaspor	28	
10	(United States) Jarmar Gulley	Gaziantep Basketbol	41	
11	(Jordan) Ahmet Düverioğlu	Fenerbahçe Beko	28	
12	(Turkey) Yiğitcan Saybir	Anadolu Efes	68	
13	(United States) Kerry Blackshear	Galatasaray Nef	32	
14	(Turkey) Onuralp Bitim	Frutti Extra Bursaspor	30	
15	(Croatia) Tomislav Zubčić	Tofaş	29	
16	(United States) Kasey Shepherd	Tofaş	26	
17	(Turkey) Yiğit Arslan	Tofaş	34	
18	(Guinea) Alpha Kaba	Gaziantep Basketbol	34	
19	(Serbia) Vasilije Micić (2)	Anadolu Efes	26	
20	(Turkey) Egehan Arna	Beşiktaş Icrypex	38	
21	(Turkey) Onuralp Bitim (2)	Frutti Extra Bursaspor	32	
22	(United States) Eugene German	Merkezefendi Belediyesi Denizli Basket	35	
24	(United States) Bonzie Colson	Pınar Karşıyaka	32	
25	(United States) Sam Dekker	Bahçeşehir Koleji	35	
26	(United States) Aubrey Dawkins	Türk Telekom	35	
27	(United States) Nathan Boothe	Darüşşafaka	41	
28	(United States) Evan Bruinsma	Büyükçekmece Basketbol	38	
29	(Turkey) Kenan Sipahi	Beşiktaş Icrypex	32	
30	(United States) Sean Armand	Petkim Spor	37	

== Turkish clubs in European competitions ==
Team	Competition	Progress
Anadolu Efes	EuroLeague	Champions
Fenerbahçe Beko	EuroLeague	Regular Season
Frutti Extra Bursaspor	EuroCup	Runners-up
Türk Telekom	EuroCup	Eightfinals
Beşiktaş Icrypex	Champions League	Play-ins
Darüşşafaka	Champions League	Round of 16
Galatasaray Nef	Champions League	Round of 16
Pınar Karşıyaka	Champions League	Play-ins
Tofaş	Champions League	Quarterfinals
Bahçeşehir Koleji	FIBA Europe Cup	Champions
