= 2022 Turkish Basketball Presidential Cup =

Anadolu Efes	Fenerbahçe Beko
71	62
- Date: 28 September 2022
- Venue: Ankara Arena, Ankara
- MVP: (Croatia) Ante Žižić

The 2022 Turkish Basketball Presidential Cup (Turkish: 2022 Erkekler Basketbol Cumhurbaşkanlığı Kupası) was the 36th edition of the Turkish Basketball Presidential Cup. The game was played between Anadolu Efes, winners of the 2022 Turkish Basketball Cup and Fenerbahçe Beko, champions of the 2021–22 Basketbol Süper Ligi.

Anadolu Efes won their 13th championship in their 24th final appearance, while Fenerbahçe played a total of 17 President's Cup finals and won only 7 of them.

== Venue ==
Ankara	2022 Turkish Basketball Presidential Cup (Turkey)
Ankara Arena	2022 Turkish Basketball Presidential Cup (Turkey)
Capacity: 10,400	2022 Turkish Basketball Presidential Cup (Turkey)

== Match details ==
Ante Žižić, who had 22 points, 9 rebounds and 1 assist in the game, was named the Presidential Cup MVP.

28 September 2022	Anadolu Efes	71–62	Fenerbahçe Beko	Ankara
19:00 (TRT)	Scoring by quarter: 15–23, 8–19, 13–12, 26–17
TRT Spor	Pts: Žižić 22; Rebs: Clyburn 10; Asts: Micić 9 PIR: Žižić 25	Boxscore	Pts: Hayes 13; Rebs: Pierre 6 Asts: Calathes 6 PIR: Gudurić, Hayes 12	Arena: Ankara Arena; Referees: Erşan Kartal, Hüseyin Çelik, Can Mavisu

Starters:			Pts	Reb	Ast
PG	22	(Serbia) Vasilije Micić	16	3	9
SG	1	(France) Rodrigue Beaubois	11	3	7
SF	12	(United States) Will Clyburn	14	10	0
PF	22	(France) Amath M'Baye	8	5	2
C	41	(Croatia) Ante Žižić	22	5	1
Reserves:					
PG	4	(Turkey) Doğuş Balbay	0	0	0
PF	5	(Turkey) Karahan Efeoğlu	DNP		
PG	10	(Turkey) Ömercan İlyasoğlu	DNP		
SG	11	(Turkey) Erten Gazi	0	0	0
C	15	(Turkey) Egemen Güven	0	0	0
PF	18	(Turkey) Egehan Arna	0	2	0
G	19	(Turkey) Buğrahan Tuncer	DNP		
Head coach:
(Turkey) Ergin Ataman

Anadolu Efes	Fenerbahçe

A. Efes	Statistics	Fenerbahçe
15/29 (51.7%)	2-pt field goals	18/32 (56.3%)
8/25 (32%)	3-pt field goals	7/28 (25%)
17/23 (73.9%)	Free throws	5/6 (83.3%)
6	Offensive rebounds	8
27	Defensive rebounds	26
33	Total rebounds	34
19	Assists	15
10	Turnovers	13
7	Steals	5
3	Blocks	2
14	Fouls	25

2022 Turkish Presidential Cup champions
Anadolu Efes
(13th title)

Starters:			Pts	Reb	Ast
PG	2	(Turkey) Şehmus Hazer	4	4	3
SG	3	(Turkey) Scottie Wilbekin	6	2	1
SF	21	(Canada) Dyshawn Pierre	6	6	1
PF	1	(Turkey) Metecan Birsen	4	5	1
C	0	(United States) Johnathan Motley	4	2	0
Reserves:					
C	9	(Turkey) Samet Geyik	2	1	0
SG	10	(Turkey) Melih Mahmutoğlu	6	0	1
F	11	(Turkey) Nigel Hayes	13	1	0
SF	13	(Turkey) Tarik Biberovic	DNP		
SG	23	(Serbia) Marko Gudurić	10	4	3
PG	33	(Greece) Nick Calathes	7	5	6
Head coach:
(Greece) Dimitrios Itoudis
