= Tibor Pleiß =

German basketball player (born 1989)

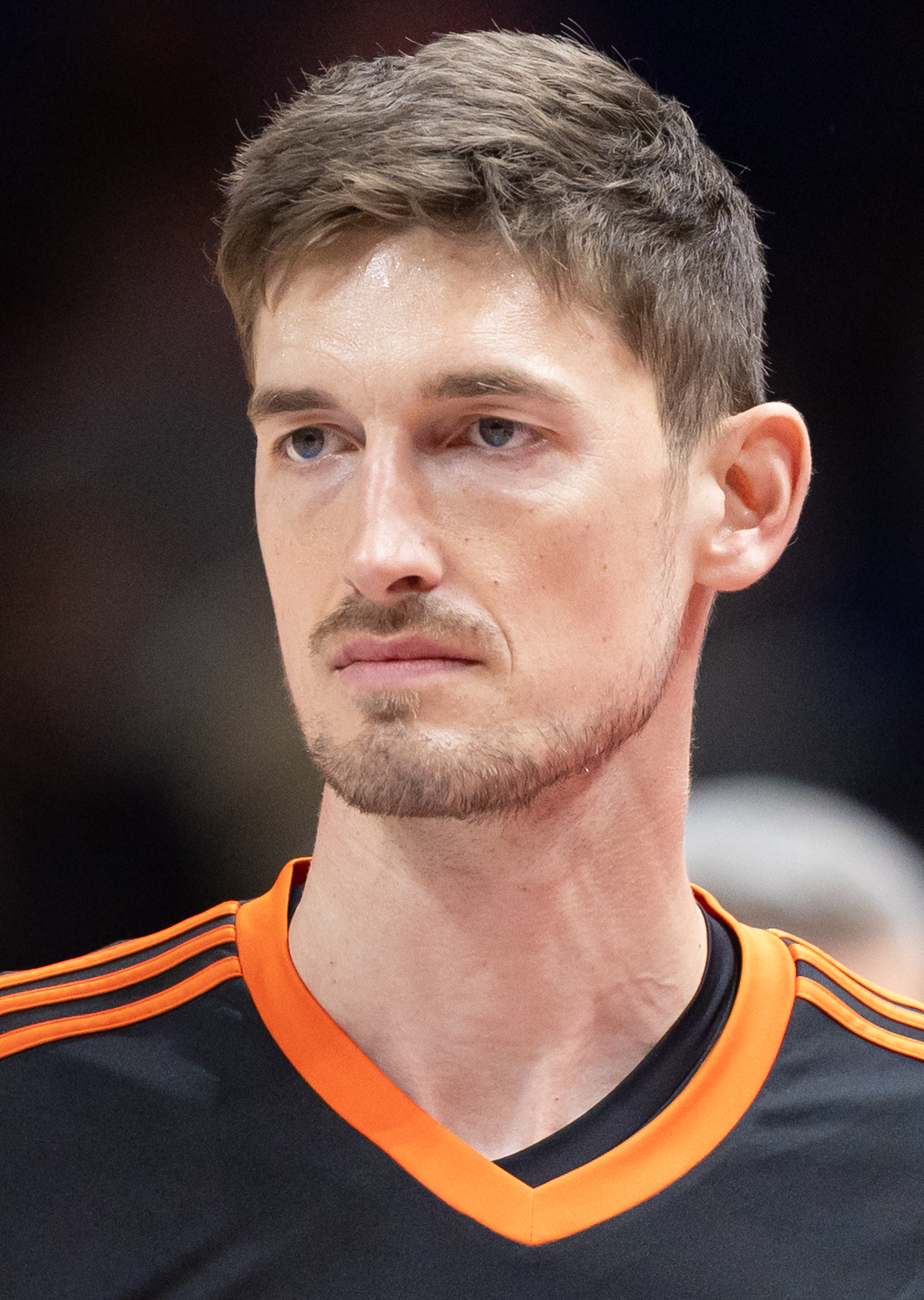
- Pleiß with SC Rasta Vechta in 2026

No. 21 – Rasta Vechta
- Position: Center
- League: Basketball Bundesliga

Personal information
- Born: 2 November 1989 (age 36) Bergisch Gladbach, West Germany
- Listed height: 7 ft 3 in (2.21 m)
- Listed weight: 256 lb (116 kg)

Career information
- NBA draft: 2010: 2nd round, 31st overall pick
- Drafted by: New Jersey Nets
- Playing career: 2006–present

Career history
- 2006–2009: RheinEnergie Köln / Köln 99ers
- 2009–2012: Brose Baskets
- 2012–2014: Baskonia
- 2014–2015: FC Barcelona
- 2015–2016: Utah Jazz
- 2015–2016: → Idaho Stampede
- 2016–2017: Galatasaray
- 2017–2018: Valencia
- 2018–2024: Anadolu Efes
- 2024–2025: Trapani Shark
- 2025: Panathinaikos
- 2025–present: Rasta Vechta

Career highlights
- 2× EuroLeague champion (2021, 2022); 3× German League champion (2010–2012); 3× Turkish League champion (2019, 2021, 2023); 4× German Cup winner (2007, 2010–2012); Turkish Cup winner (2022); Spanish Supercup winner (2017); 2× All-German League Team (2011, 2012); 2× German League Best Young Player (2010, 2011); Turkish Cup Final MVP (2022)
- Stats at NBA.com
- Stats at Basketball Reference

Tibor Pleiß (/plaɪs/, alternative spelling Pleiss; born 2 November 1989) is a German professional basketball player for Rasta Vechta of the Basketball Bundesliga (BBL). Standing 7 feet 3 inches (2.21 m), he plays at the center position. He is also a regular member of the German national team.

== Early life, family and education ==
Pleiß was born in Bergisch Gladbach, Germany, about 18 kilometers from Cologne. He was primarily raised in the Dellbrück neighborhood in Mülheim.

== Professional athletic career ==
=== Europe ===
Pleiß played for RheinEnergie Köln (a year later they changed their name to Köln 99ers) of the German Bundesliga as a 17-year-old in 2006. He played with the club for three years, playing in the 2008 EuroCup. After the season ended, he joined the Brose Baskets where he played for three years.

On 24 June 2012, Pleiß left Germany and signed a four-year contract with the Spanish club Saski Baskonia, one of the top teams of the Liga ACB. In the 2013–14 season, he averaged 12.4 points on 58.3 percent shooting and 6.0 rebounds in 21.8 minutes per game. He left Baskonia after two years.

On 11 August 2014, he signed a two-year contract with the Spanish club FC Barcelona. In the 2014–15 ACB season, he averaged 5.7 points and 3.8 rebounds in 13.3 minutes per game while shooting 62.3 percent from the floor. In July 2015, he broke the contract with Barcelona, in order to sign in the NBA.

=== NBA ===
Pleiß declared for the 2010 NBA draft. He was drafted by the New Jersey Nets, who traded his rights to the Atlanta Hawks. The Hawks then sold his rights to the Oklahoma City Thunder. In February 2015, his draft rights were traded to the Utah Jazz as part of a three-team trade.

On 14 July 2015, Pleiß signed a multi-year deal with the Utah Jazz. He made his NBA debut on 30 October in a 99–71 win over the Philadelphia 76ers, recording two points and one rebound in two minutes. On 2 January 2016, in a 92–87 overtime win over the Memphis Grizzlies, Pleiß set career-highs with six points, six rebounds and 17 minutes. During his rookie season, he received multiple assignments to the Idaho Stampede, Utah's D-League affiliate.

On 26 August 2016, Pleiß was traded, along with two 2017 second-round draft picks and cash considerations, to the Philadelphia 76ers in exchange for Kendall Marshall. Five days later, he was waived by the 76ers.

=== Return to Europe ===
On 12 September 2016, Pleiß signed with Turkish club Galatasaray for the 2016–17 season. On 28 July 2017 Pleiß signed a two-year deal with the Spanish club Valencia Basket. On 1 August 2018 Pleiß signed a two (1+1) year contract with the Turkish club Anadolu Efes S.K. On 12 July 2020 Pleiß renewed his contract with Efes for another three (2+1) seasons. On June 17, 2024, Pleiß parted ways with the team after six successful years. On August 8, 2024, he signed with Trapani Shark of the Italian Lega Basket Serie A.

On February 26, 2025, Pleiß signed with the defending EuroLeague champions Panathinaikos, reuniting with his Anadolu Efes coach Ergin Ataman. On July 1, 2025, Panathinaikos announced that Pleiß was released from the team.

After 13 seasons with some of Europe’s top clubs and a brief stint in the NBA, he returned home on December 3, 2025 by signing with Rasta Vechta of the Basketball Bundesliga (BBL).

== German national team ==
Pleiß was a member of the junior national teams of Germany. He played for the German junior national teams at the 2007 FIBA Europe Under-18 Championship and at both the 2008 FIBA Europe Under-20 Championship Division B and the 2009 FIBA Europe Under-20 Championship.

Pleiß is a member of the senior men's German national basketball team. He first played for the senior team at EuroBasket 2009 and saw action in three games. He was also in the German team that participated in the 2010 FIBA World Championship in Turkey, where he was the starting center for Germany. He also played at the EuroBasket 2011 and the EuroBasket 2013.

== Career statistics ==
Legend
GP	Games played	GS	Games started	MPG	Minutes per game
FG%	Field-goal percentage	3P%	3-point field-goal percentage	FT%	Free-throw percentage
RPG	Rebounds per game	APG	Assists per game	SPG	Steals per game
BPG	Blocks per game	PPG	Points per game	PIR	Performance index rating
**Bold**	Career high

=== NBA ===
==== Regular season ====
Year	Team	GP	GS	MPG	FG%	3P%	FT%	RPG	APG	SPG	BPG	PPG
2015–16	Utah	12	0	6.8	.440	.000	1.000	1.3	.2	.1	.2	2.0
Career		12	0	6.8	.440	.000	1.000	1.3	.2	.1	.2	2.0

=== EuroLeague ===
†	Denotes season in which Pleiß won the EuroLeague
*	Led the league

Year	Team	GP	GS	MPG	FG%	3P%	FT%	RPG	APG	SPG	BPG	PPG	PIR
2010–11	Bamberg	10	10	19.1	.413	.444	.789	**6.3**	**.9**	.1	**1.5**	6.7	8.6
2011–12	Bamberg	10	4	18.5	.500	.000	.682	5.4	.4	.0	.8	6.5	8.1
2012–13	Baskonia	25	4	14.2	.607	.333	.846	3.9	.2	.2	.6	5.0	6.1
2013–14	Baskonia	24	21	**21.0**	.557	.333	.863	5.4	.5	**.5**	1.0	**12.0**	**13.7**
2014–15	Barcelona	25	1	13.1	.584	**.500**	.848	3.9	.2	.2	.6	5.3	6.9
2016–17	Galatasaray	28	20	17.1	.567	.400	.765	4.6	.5	.2	1.2	7.7	10.4
2017–18	Valencia	29	14	19.3	.565	**.500**	.797	5.2	.6	.4	1.1	10.1	12.4
2018–19	Anadolu Efes	37*	5	14.2	**.623**	.333	.878	3.7	.4	.4	.5	8.1	9.6
2019–20	Anadolu Efes	28*	22	18.8	.613	.250	**.926**	4.3	.4	**.5**	.5	9.5	11.3
2020–21†	Anadolu Efes	24	9	12.0	.574	.412	.889	2.7	.5	.2	.3	6.8	7.5
2021–22†	Anadolu Efes	**40***	**26**	18.1	.569	.442	.891	4.3	.6	.4	.5	9.6	11.2
2022–23	Anadolu Efes	33	19	15.1	.535	.326	.913	2.9	.5	.2	.3	6.7	6.7
2023–24	Anadolu Efes	23	19	18.0	.486	.435	.889	3.6	.7	.3	.6	7.8	8.0
Career		336	174	16.6	.564	.391	.842	4.2	.5	.3	.7	8.0	9.5

=== EuroCup ===
Year	Team	GP	GS	MPG	FG%	3P%	FT%	RPG	APG	SPG	BPG	PPG	PIR
2007–08	Köln 99ers	2	0	3.5	—	.000	—	—	—	—	—	0.0	-1.5
2009–10	Bamberg	**12**	**10**	**17.7**	**.521**	—	**.758**	**5.7**	**.2**	**.3**	**.8**	**8.3**	**9.8**
Career		14	10	15.6	.514	.000	.758	4.9	.1	.3	.7	7.1	8.1

=== Domestic leagues ===
Year	Team	League	GP	MPG	FG%	3P%	FT%	RPG	APG	SPG	BPG	PPG
2006–07	(Germany) Köln 99ers	BBL	6	3.3	.444	.667	.000	1.0	—	—	.2	1.7
2007–08	(Germany) Köln 99ers	BBL	6	6.6	.200	.000	.625	1.5	.2	.2	—	1.5
2008–09	(Germany) Köln 99ers	BBL	27	12.0	.482	.250	.650	2.8	.2	.3	.8	5.0
2009–10	(Germany) Bamberg	BBL	45	19.3	.564	.444	.708	5.9	.3	.2	1.3	8.0
2010–11	(Germany) Bamberg	BBL	47	20.1	.523	.389	.764	6.5	.7	.4	1.6	8.9
2011–12	(Germany) Bamberg	BBL	44	20.0	.593	.429	.826	6.0	.5	.2	1.4	10.1
2012–13	(Spain) Baskonia	ACB	34	16.3	.584	.333	.725	4.9	.3	.3	.8	6.2
2013–14	(Spain) Baskonia	ACB	34	22.4	.596	—	.811	6.5	.5	1.1	1.2	12.7
2014–15	(Spain) Barcelona	ACB	43	13.9	.644	.500	.864	3.8	.3	.3	.5	5.7
2015–16	(United States) Idaho Stampede	D-League	28	31.5	.583	.316	.877	10.4	1.6	.5	1.4	12.3
2016–17	(Turkey) Galatasaray	TBSL	25	22.0	.644	.500	.797	6.9	.7	.4	1.2	9.6
2017–18	(Spain) Valencia	ACB	24	18.9	.555	.385	.731	6.2	.6	.3	.8	9.8
2018–19	(Turkey) Anadolu Efes	TBSL	6	25.4	.571	.400	.889	7.8	2.0	.2	.5	15.3
2019–20	(Turkey) Anadolu Efes	TBSL	15	22.3	.620	.429	.857	6.6	.6	.6	.5	11.4
2020–21	(Turkey) Anadolu Efes	TBSL	13	21.9	.658	.400	.935	6.4	1.1	.7	.4	15.4
2021–22	(Turkey) Anadolu Efes	TBSL	25	25.3	.579	.388	.857	5.5	1.1	.5	.7	12.8
2022–23	(Turkey) Anadolu Efes	TBSL	16	24.2	.486	.296	.857	6.2	.7	.6	.4	9.2
2023–24	(Turkey) Anadolu Efes	TBSL	2	23.0	.500	.556	1.000	5.5	—	.5	.5	14.5
2024–25	(Italy) Trapani Shark	LBA	17	14.2	.534	.238	.826	3.4	.5	.6	.3	6.0
