= Egemen Güven =

Turkish basketball player (born 1996)

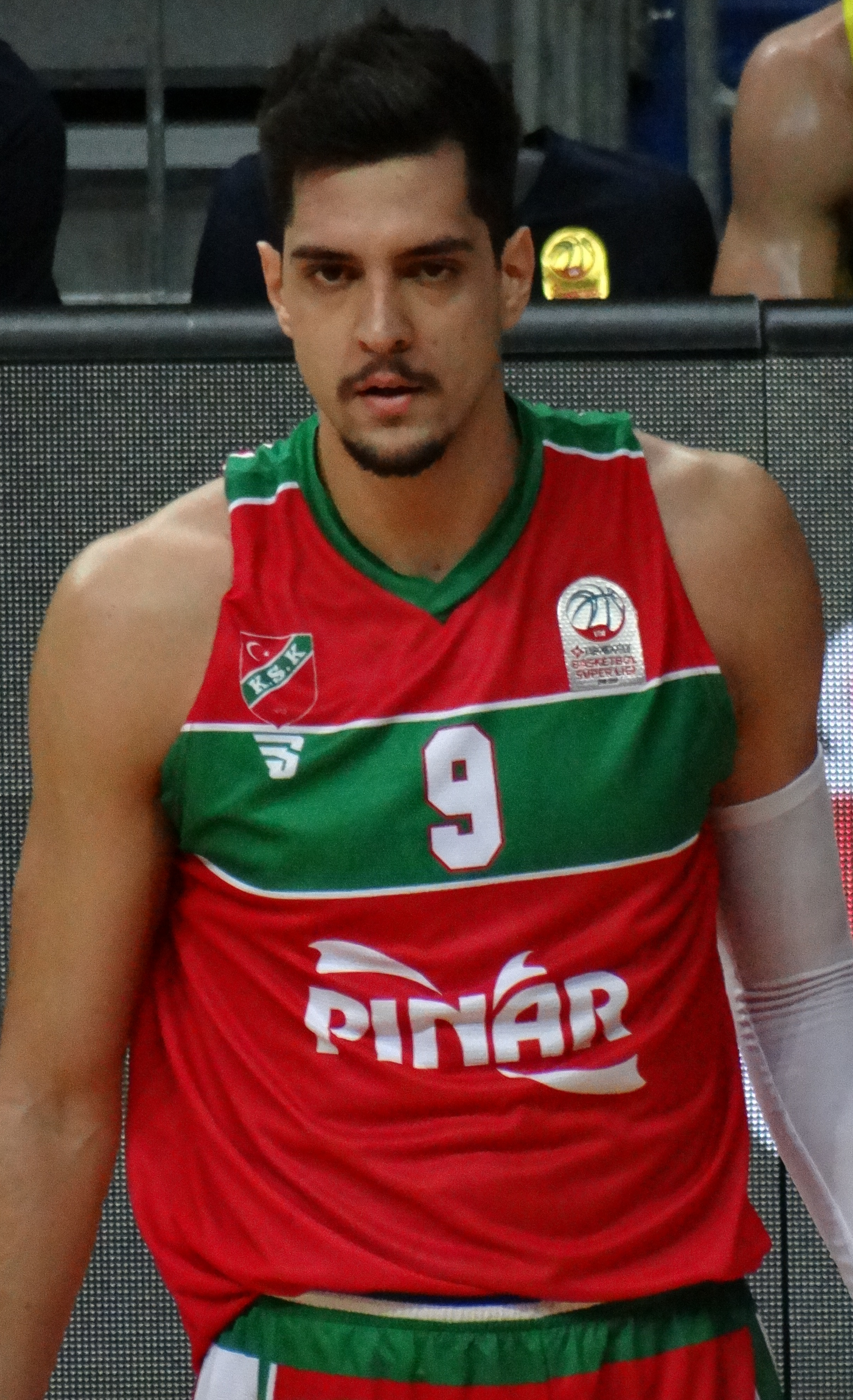

No. 15 – Yukatel Denizli Basket
- Position: Center
- League: Basketbol Süper Ligi

Personal information
- Born: 25 September 1996 (age 30) İzmir, Turkey
- Listed height: 7 ft 0 in (2.13 m)
- Listed weight: 220 lb (100 kg)

Career information
- Playing career: 2013–present

Career history
- 2013–2019: Karşıyaka
- 2019–2020: Türk Telekom
- 2020–2021: Afyon Belediye
- 2021–2022: Bursaspor
- 2022–2023: Anadolu Efes
- 2022–2023: → Beşiktaş
- 2023–2024: Bahçeşehir Koleji
- 2024–2025: Yalovaspor Basketbol
- 2025: Merkezefendi Belediyesi Denizli
- 2025–2026: Karşıyaka
- 2026–present: Denizli Basket

Career highlights
- EuroLeague champion (2022); Turkish Super Cup winner (2022); Turkish Cup winner (2022); FIBA Europe Under-18 Championship MVP (2014)
Medals
Men's basketball
Representing Turkey
FIBA Under-19 World Championship
Bronze medal – third place	2015 Greece	U-19 Team
U18 European Championship
Gold medal – first place	2013 Latvia	U-18 Team
Gold medal – first place	2014 Turkey	U-18 Team
U16 European Championship
Gold medal – first place	2012 Latvia/Lithuania	U-16 Team

Akif Egemen Güven (born 25 September 1996) is a Turkish professional basketball player for Yukatel Denizli Basket of the Basketbol Süper Ligi (BSL).

== Turkish national team ==
He is a regular Turkish youth national team player. Güven won three straight championships during his youth national team career. He helped Turkey to 1st place at the 2012 FIBA Europe Under-16 Championship, 2013 FIBA Europe Under-18 Championship and 2014 FIBA Europe Under-18 Championship. He was named MVP and headed the All-Tournament Team as he averaged 13.8 points, 6.9 rebounds, 0.7 assists, 1.8 blocks at 2014 FIBA Europe Under-18 Championship.

== Career statistics ==
Legend
GP	Games played	GS	Games started	MPG	Minutes per game
FG%	Field-goal percentage	3P%	3-point field-goal percentage	FT%	Free-throw percentage
RPG	Rebounds per game	APG	Assists per game	SPG	Steals per game
BPG	Blocks per game	PPG	Points per game	PIR	Performance index rating
**Bold**	Career high

=== EuroLeague ===
Year	Team	GP	GS	MPG	FG%	3P%	FT%	RPG	APG	SPG	BPG	PPG	PIR
2015–16	Karşıyaka	2	0	11.5	.333	—	—	.5	—	.5	—	2.0	-1.5
Career		2	0	11.5	.333	—	—	.5	—	.5	—	2.0	-1.5

=== Domestic leagues ===
Season	Team	League	GP	MPG	FG%	3P%	FT%	RPG	APG	SPG	BPG	PPG
2013-14	Pınar Karşıyaka	TBL	8	6.8	.643	--	.500	1.8	.0	.3	.3	2.4
2014-15	Pınar Karşıyaka	TBL	13	8.3	.516	.000	.700	1.5	.2	.2	.2	3.0
