= Eray Aydoğan =

Turkish basketball player (born 2000)

Free Agent
- Position: Point guard

Personal information
- Born: February 25, 2000 (age 26) Şişli, Istanbul, Turkey
- Listed height: 6 ft 1 in (1.85 m)

Career information
- Playing career: 2016–present

Career history
- 2016–2018: FMV Işıkspor
- 2018–2020: Antalya Gençlik
- 2020–2022: Galatasaray Nef
- 2022: Büyükçekmece Basketbol
- 2022–2024: Samsunspor
- 2024–2025: Çayırova Basketbol
- 2025–2026: Darüşşafaka

Eray Aydoğan (born February 25, 2000) is a Turkish professional basketball player who plays as a point guard for Darüşşafaka of the Türkiye Basketbol Ligi (TBL).
