= Canberk Kuş =

Turkish basketball player (born 1996)

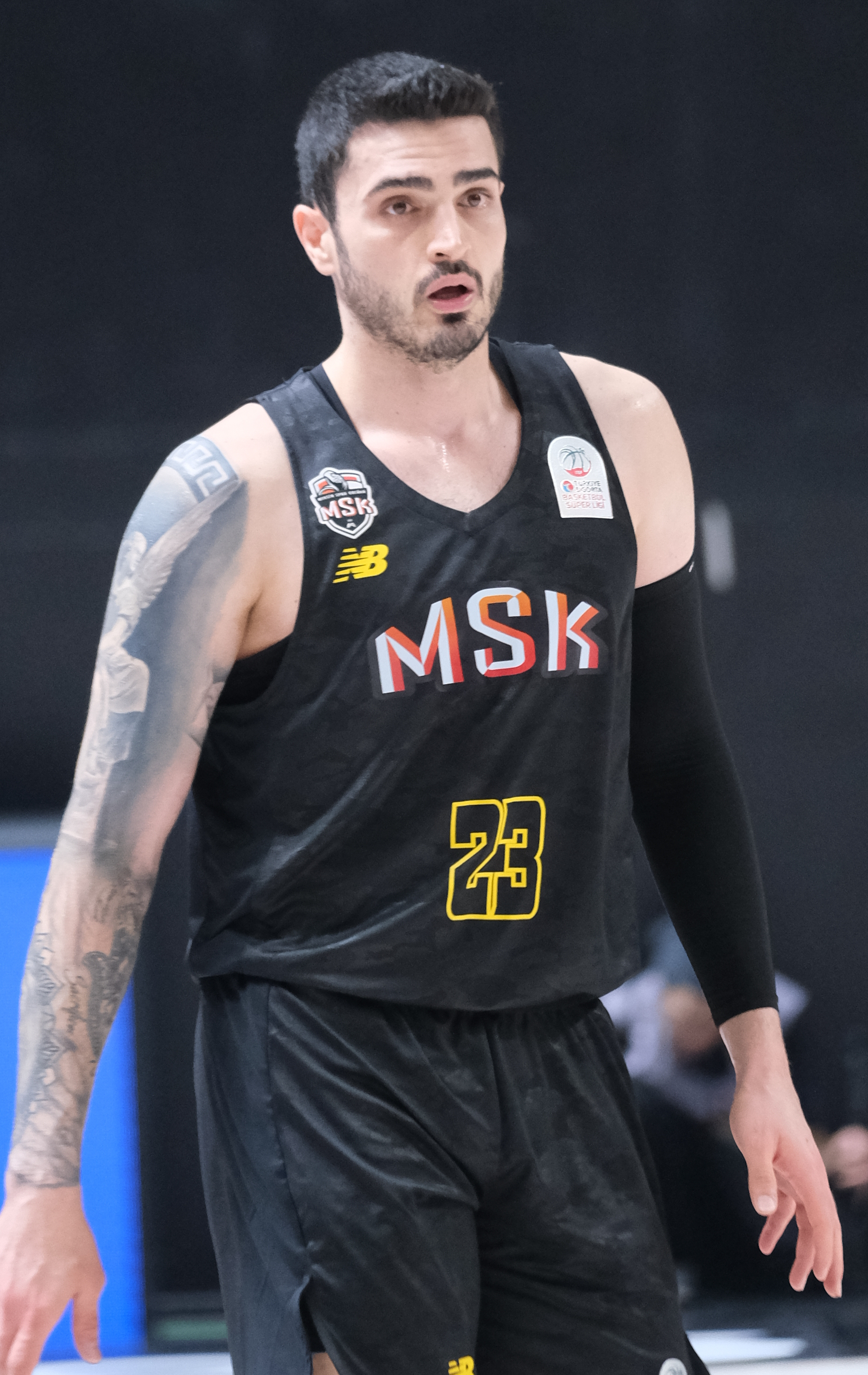

No. 12 – Çayırova Belediyespor
- Position: Small forward
- League: Basketbol Süper Ligi

Personal information
- Born: August 12, 1996 (age 30) Marmaris, Turkey
- Listed height: 6 ft 6 in (1.98 m)
- Listed weight: 207 lb (94 kg)

Career information
- High school: Victory Rock Prep (Sarasota, Florida)
- College: Arkansas State (2019–2020)
- NBA draft: 2021: undrafted
- Playing career: 2020–present

Career history
- 2020–2021: Petkim Spor
- 2021–2022: Galatasaray Nef
- 2022–2023: Darüşşafaka
- 2023–2025: Mersin MSK
- 2025–2026: Beşiktaş Gain
- 2026–present: Çayırova Belediyespor

Canberk Kuş (born August 12, 1996) is a Turkish professional basketball player who plays as a small forward for Çayırova Belediyespor of the Basketbol Süper Ligi (BSL).

== Education ==
- Marmaris Basketball Club (2011–2012)
- Beylerbeyi Sports Club (2011–2012)
- Besiktas JK (2012–2013)
- Victory Rock Prep (2014–2017)
- Arkansas University (2017–2020)

== Professional career ==
=== Petkim Spor (2020–2021) ===
On August 5, 2020, he has signed with Petkim Spor of the Basketbol Süper Ligi (BSL).

=== Galatasaray (2021–2022) ===
On 11 August 2021, he has signed with BSL club Galatasaray Nef.

=== Darüşşafaka (2022–2023) ===
On June 8, 2022, he has signed with Darüşşafaka of the Basketbol Süper Ligi (BSL).

=== Mersin MSK (2023–2025) ===
On December 18, 2023, he signed with Mersin Büyükşehir Belediyesi of the Türkiye Basketbol Ligi (TBL)

=== Beşiktaş Gain (2025–2026) ===
On July 14, 2025, he signed with Beşiktaş Gain of the Turkish Basketbol Süper Ligi.

=== Çayırova Belediyespor (2026–present) ===
On June 22, 2026, he signed with Çayırova Belediyespor of the Basketbol Süper Ligi (BSL).
