= Andreas Pistiolis =

Greek basketball coach

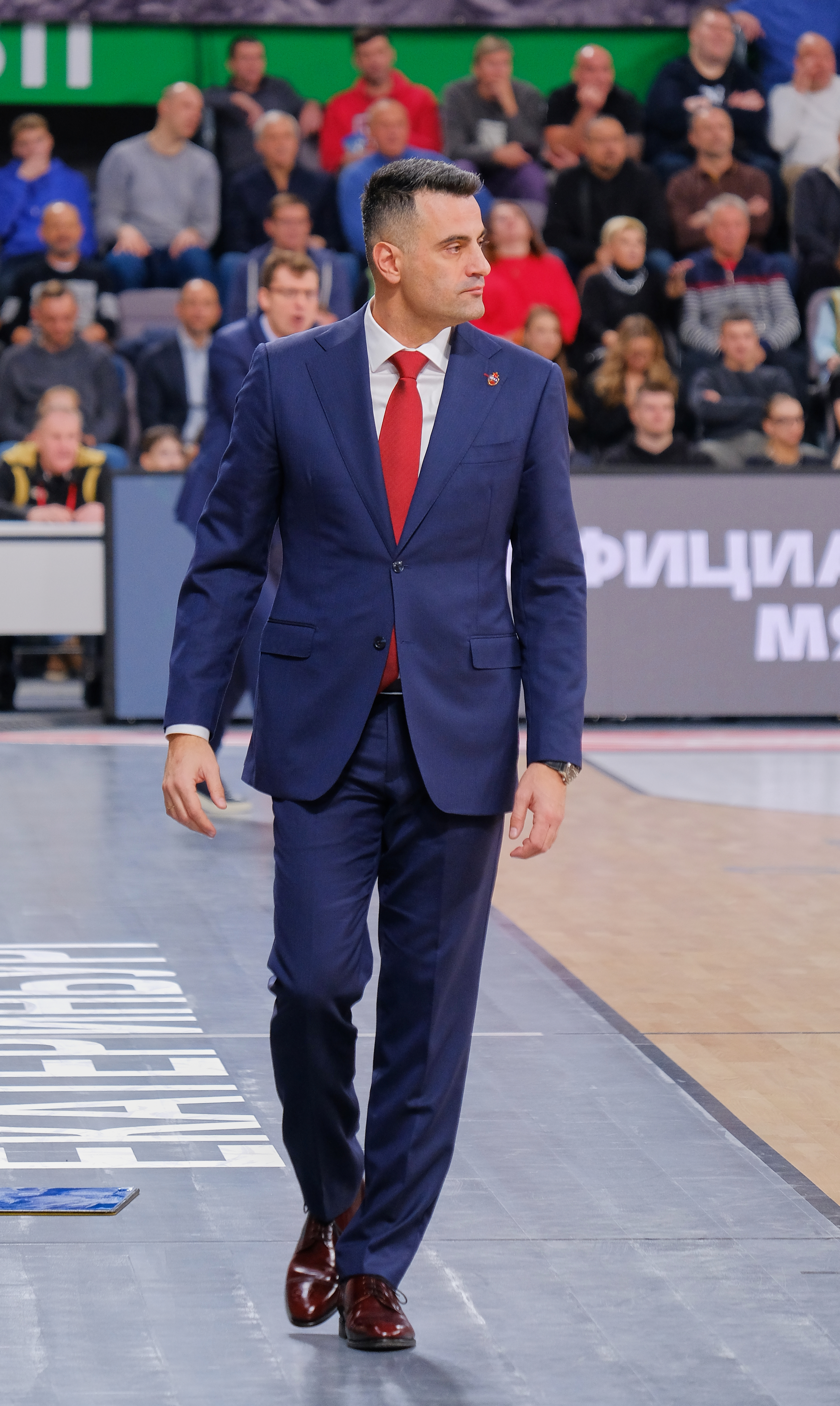

PBC CSKA Moscow
- Position: Head coach
- League: VTB United League

Personal information
- Born: July 6, 1978 (age 48) Athens, Greece
- Coaching career: 2005–present

Career history

Coaching
- 2005–2012: Panathinaikos (assistant)
- 2013–2014: Banvit (assistant)
- 2014–2022: CSKA Moscow (assistant)
- 2022–2023: Galatasaray
- 2024–present: CSKA Moscow

Career highlights
- As head coach: 3× VTB United League champion (2024–2026); 2× VTB United League Supercup winner (2024, 2025); VTB United League Coach of the Year (2026); As assistant coach: 5× EuroLeague champion (2007, 2009, 2011, 2016, 2019); 6× VTB United League champion (2015–2019, 2021); 6× Greek League champion (2006–2011); 5× Greek Cup winner (2006–2009, 2012)

Andreas Pistiolis (born on 6 July 1978; in Athens, Greece), is a Greek professional basketball coach, who is currently the head coach of CSKA Moscow. He has previously served as an assistant next to top-tier European coaches such as Željko Obradović and Dimitrios Itoudis.

== Coaching career ==
Andreas Pistiolis, started his coaching career with the Panathinaikos youth team between 1996 and 2005, started to work as an assistant coach for the Panathinaikos parent club in 2005. During his seven seasons there, he was the assistant of Serbian coach Željko Obradović.

Pistiolis moved to Banvit as an assistant of Dimitris Itoudis in the 2013–2014 season, after one season there, he signed with CSKA Moscow by following Itoudis, and he was worked as the first assistant coach of CSKA Moscow for 8 seasons, between 2014 and 2022.

On 19 March 2022, he became the head coach of Galatasaray Nef of the Turkish BSL. On 26 November 2022, it was announced that the contract with Galatasaray Nef was extended until 2025.

In the notification made by Galatasaray Sports Club on 9 May 2023, it was announced that Pistiolis, who has been working as Galatasaray Nef Head Coach since the second half of the 2021–22 season, parted ways.

On April 15, 2024, he signed with CSKA Moscow of the VTB United League.
