= Sean Armand =

American professional basketball player

Personal information
- Born: August 26, 1991 (age 35) Brooklyn, New York, U.S.
- Listed height: 6 ft 4 in (1.93 m)
- Listed weight: 198 lb (90 kg)

Career information
- High school: Jacqueline Kennedy Onassis (New York City)
- College: Iona (2010–2014)
- NBA draft: 2014: undrafted
- Playing career: 2014–present
- Position: Shooting guard

Career history
- 2014–2015: Skyliners Frankfurt
- 2015–2017: İstanbul BB
- 2017–2018: Gaziantep
- 2018–2019: Zenit Saint Petersburg
- 2019: Bahçeşehir Koleji
- 2020–2021: Élan Chalon
- 2021: Fuenlabrada
- 2021–2022: Petkim Spor
- 2022: Dynamo Lebanon
- 2022–2023: Al Ittihad Alexandria
- 2023: Avtodor Saratov
- 2023: Cedevita Olimpija
- 2024: Shandong Hi-Speed Kirin
- 2024: BC Šiauliai

Sean Armand (born August 26, 1991) is an American professional basketball player who last played for BC Šiauliai of the Lithuanian Basketball League. He played college basketball at Iona College in New York state.

== Professional career ==
On July 31, 2017, Armand signed a one-year deal with the Turkish team Gaziantep Basketbol. In 44 games played during the 2017–18 season, he averaged 15 points, 3.4 rebounds, 4.7 assists

On July 23, 2018, Armand signed with the Russian team Zenit Saint Petersburg for the 2018–19 season.

On August 4, 2019, he has signed with Bahçeşehir Koleji of the Basketbol Süper Ligi (BSL).

On January 16, 2020, he has signed with an agent Charles Misuraca and joined Élan Chalon of the LNB Pro A. On August 21, 2020, he has signed with Maccabi Rishon LeZion of the Israeli Premier League. Armand was released on September 21. He re-signed with Elan Chalon on October 1. He averaged 16.8 points, 4.6 assists, 3.4 rebounds and 1.0 steals per game. On August 16, 2021, Armand signed with Fuenlabrada of the Spanish Liga ACB. He averaged 11 points, 2.6 assists, 2.4 rebounds, and 1.3 steals per game.

On December 1, Armand signed with Petkim Spor of the Turkish Basketball Super League.

In May 2022, he joined Lebanese side Dynamo. On August 23, 2022, Armand joined Al Ittihad Alexandria of the Egyptian Basketball Super League. In February 2023, he transferred to Russian club Avtodor Saratov.

In August 2023, he signed with an agent Tadas Gimzauskas and joined Cedevita Olimpija for the 2023–24 season. Sean Armand averaged 6.3 points, 2 assists, and 3 rebounds per game in EuroCup Basketball tournament. Later that season he joined Chinese Basketball Association side Shandong Hi-Speed Kirin. He averaged 8 points and 2.1 assists per game.

== The Basketball Tournament ==
Sean Arman played for Gael Nation in the 2018 edition of The Basketball Tournament. In 2 games, he averaged 22 points, 3.5 assists, and 3 steals per game. Gael Nation reached the second round before falling to Armored Athlete.
