= Alpha Kaba =

French basketball player (born 1996)

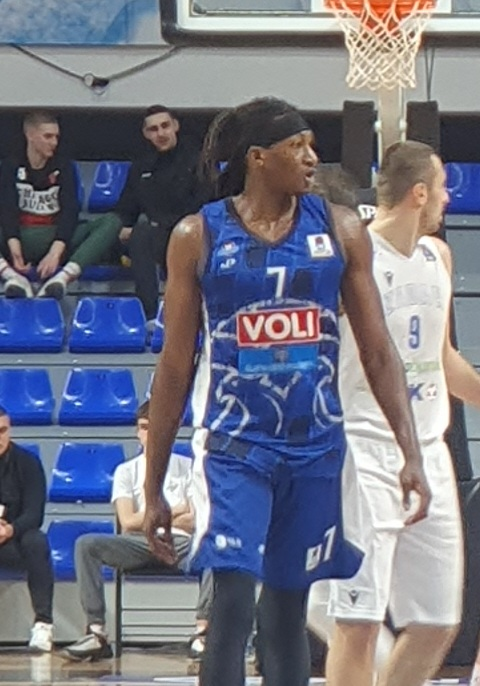
- Kaba in 2023

Free agent
- Position: Center / power forward

Personal information
- Born: 29 January 1996 (age 30) Blois, France
- Listed height: 2.08 m (6 ft 10 in)
- Listed weight: 105 kg (231 lb)

Career information
- NBA draft: 2017: 2nd round, 60th overall pick
- Drafted by: Atlanta Hawks
- Playing career: 2014–present

Career history
- 2014–2015: Élan Béarnais
- 2015–2017: Mega Basket
- 2017–2019: ASVEL
- 2019–2020: Boulazac
- 2020–2021: Nanterre 92
- 2021–2022: Gaziantep
- 2022–2023: Budućnost
- 2023–2024: Jiangsu Dragons
- 2024: Valencia
- 2024: Maccabi Tel Aviv
- 2024–2025: Goyang Sono Skygunners
- 2025: Shijiazhuang Xianglan
- 2025–2026: Shenzhen Leopards

Career highlights
- 2× EuroCup rebounding leader (2021, 2023); CBA rebounding leader (2024); LNB Pro A champion (2019); Montenegrin League champion (2023); Serbian Cup winner (2016); French Cup winner (2019); Montenegrin Cup winner (2023); ABA League rebounding leader (2017); Basketbol Süper Ligi MVP (2022); Turkish League rebounding leader (2022)
- Stats at Basketball Reference

Alpha Kaba (born 29 January 1996) is a French-Guinean professional basketball player who most recently played for the Shenzhen Leopards of the Chinese Basketball Association (CBA). He represents the Guinean national team in international competitions.

== Career ==
He spent the early parts of his career at Romorantin-Lanthenay town where he had grown up. From 2009 to 2011, Kaba played for ADA Blois before joining the youth ranks of Elan Bearnais Pau-Lacq-Orthez. He made his professional debut in the French elite league Pro A on 26 September 2014, tallying two points and four rebounds in nine minutes of play against Entente Orléans 45.

In July 2015, Kaba signed with Serbian club Mega Leks. In his second season with the Mega Leks, Kaba became the Adriatic League's leading rebounder for the entire 2016–17 season.

On 28 July 2017 Kaba signed a three-year contract with ASVEL Basket.

On 18 September 2019 he signed with Boulazac Basket Dordogne of LNB Pro A. He averaged 8.8 points and 8.6 rebounds per game. Kaba signed with Nanterre 92 on 3 July 2020. On 21 November he was named EuroCup player of the week, after posting 21 points and twelve rebounds in a win against Aquila Basket Trento.

On 28 July 2021, Kaba signed with Gaziantep of the ING Basketbol Süper Ligi. He was named the MVP of the regular season after helping Gaziantep finish in the fourth place, while averaging 13.5 points and 10.5 rebounds per game.

On 4 August 2022, Kaba signed for Budućnost VOLI. He signed a deal with the Chinese club Jiangsu Dragons in September 2023.

On 2 April 2024, Kaba signed with Valencia of the Spanish Liga ACB. On 16 June of the same year, he parted ways with the Spanish club.

On 27 September 2024, Kaba signed a one-and-a-half-month contract with Maccabi Playtika Tel Aviv of the Israeli Basketball Premier League and the EuroLeague.

On 16 December 2024, Kaba joined the Goyang Sono Skygunners of the Korean Basketball League to replace Alan Williams. On 12 February 2025, his contract was terminated, replacing by Alan Williams.

=== NBA draft rights ===
In 2016, Kaba originally entered his name for the 2016 NBA draft, but ultimately withdrew his name on the day of the international deadline. A year later, he put his name as an international entry for the 2017 NBA draft. On 22 June 2017 Kaba was selected with the final pick in the 2017 NBA draft by the Atlanta Hawks. On 8 July 2023, Kaba's draft rights were acquired by the Houston Rockets. On 6 February 2025, Kaba's draft rights were acquired by the Atlanta Hawks. On 30 June 2026, Kaba's draft rights were traded to the Sacramento Kings in exchange for Devin Carter and a second-round pick.

== International career ==
In 2014, Kaba played for the French under 18 national team at the Albert-Schweitzer-Tournament in Germany and at the European Championships in Turkey, earning Eurobasket.com All-European Championships U18 Honorable Mention.

He helped the French under 20 national team reach the semifinals of the 2015 European Championships in Italy.

In his senior career, Kaba switched to play for the Guinea national basketball team.

== Personal life ==
Kaba is of Guinean descent.

== See also ==
- List of French NBA players
