= Dee Bost =

American-Bulgarian basketball player

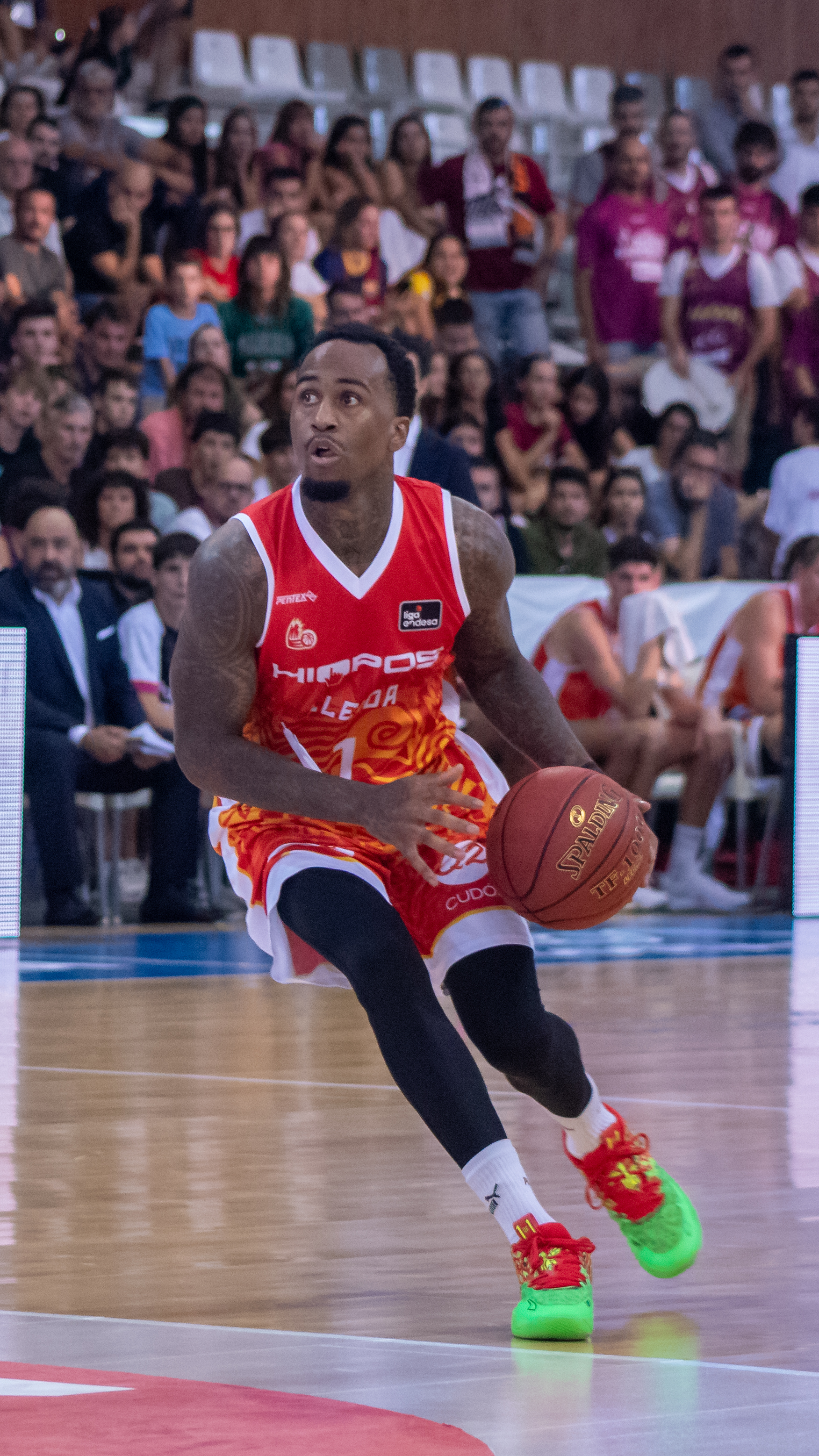
- Bost with Força Lleida in 2024.

Tindastóll
- Position: Point guard
- League: Úrvalsdeild

Personal information
- Born: October 12, 1989 (age 37) Charlotte, North Carolina, U.S.
- Listed height: 6 ft 2 in (1.88 m)
- Listed weight: 176 lb (80 kg)

Career information
- High school: Concord (Concord, North Carolina); Hargrave Military Academy (Chatham, Virginia)
- College: Mississippi State (2008–2012)
- NBA draft: 2012: undrafted
- Playing career: 2012–present

Career history
- 2012–2013: Budućnost Podgorica
- 2013–2014: Idaho Stampede
- 2014: Trotamundos de Carabobo
- 2014–2015: Trabzonspor
- 2015–2016: Stelmet Zielona Góra
- 2016–2017: Monaco
- 2017: Žalgiris Kaunas
- 2017–2018: SIG Strasbourg
- 2018–2019: BC Khimki
- 2019–2021: Monaco
- 2021–2023: Galatasaray Nef
- 2023: ASVEL
- 2023: Metropolitans 92
- 2023–2024: Galatasaray Ekmas
- 2024: Indios de Mayagüez
- 2024: Trotamundos de Carabobo
- 2024: Força Lleida
- 2024–2025: Al-Rayyan
- 2025: Tabiat
- 2025: Flamengo
- 2025–2026: Al-Arabi
- 2026–present: Tindastóll

Career highlights
- EuroBasket assist leader (2022); EuroCup champion (2021); French League Cup winner (2017); French Federation Cup winner (2018); Polish League champion (2016); Polish League Finals MVP (2016); Montenegrin League champion (2013); NBA D-League All-Star (2014); NBA D-League All-Defensive Third Team (2014); First-team All-SEC (2012); 2× Second-team All-SEC (2010, 2011); SEC All-Freshman Team (2009)
- Stats at Basketball Reference

Demarquis D'Angelo Bost (Bulgarian: Демаркис "Дий" Бост; born October 12, 1989) is an American-born naturalized Bulgarian professional basketball player. He also represents the Bulgarian national team internationally. He played college basketball for the Mississippi State Bulldogs.

== High school career ==
Bost attended Concord High School in Concord, North Carolina. As a senior in 2006–07, he averaged 17 points, 6.5 rebounds and five assists per game to help lead coach Andy Poplin's Concord team to the NCHSAA 3A state hoops crown. In conjunction with basketball, Bost helped the Spiders become the first 3A school in North Carolina history to claim state titles in both football and basketball during the same academic year. He passed for 2,958 yards and 25 touchdowns on 64-percent accuracy to direct coach E.Z. Smith's 13–3 Spiders to the 2006 NCHSAA 3A state football title.

He was subsequently named the 2006–07 Male Athlete of the Year by the North Carolina High School Athletic Association (NCHSAA) and The Charlotte Observer newspaper.

=== Prep season ===
In 2007, Bost enrolled at Hargrave Military Academy in Chatham, Virginia for one prep season. In 2007–08, he averaged 18.5 points, 5.5 rebounds, 4.7 assists and 3.6 steals per game to help lead Hargrave Military to a perfect 29–0 record and the 2008 National Prep Championship title.

== College career ==
In his freshman season at Mississippi State, he was named to the 2009 SEC All-Freshman team. In 36 games, he averaged 10.9 points, 3.6 rebounds, 4.3 assists and 1.4 steals per game.

In his sophomore season, he was named to the 2010 All-SEC second team. In 36 games, he averaged 13.0 points, 4.4 rebounds, 5.2 assists and 1.3 steals in 34.9 minutes per game.

In April 2010, he declared for the NBA draft. In September 2010, he was suspended for 14 games by the NCAA for failing to withdraw properly before the NBA draft's deadline in May and failing to maintain his academics in the spring semester and offseason. Following the suspension, Bost returned to the Bulldogs' line-up as team captain and went on to be named to the All-SEC second team for the second straight year. In 17 games, he averaged 15.3 points, 3.5 rebounds, 6.2 assists and 1.6 steals in 35.5 minutes per game.

In his senior year, he was named to the All-SEC first team and the NABC Division I All-District 21 second team. In 33 games, he averaged 15.8 points, 3.3 rebounds, 5.5 assists and 2.0 steals in 36.3 minutes per game.

== Professional career ==
=== Budućnost Podgorica (2012–2013) ===
After going undrafted in the 2012 NBA draft, Bost joined the Portland Trail Blazers for the 2012 NBA Summer League. In August 2012, he signed a two-year deal with Budućnost Podgorica of Montenegro. After averaging 9.1 points, 3.3 rebounds, 2.2 assists and 1.1 steals per game in 2012–13, he parted ways with the club.

=== Idaho Stampede (2013–2014) ===
On August 19, 2013, Bost signed with the Portland Trail Blazers. However, he was later waived by the Trail Blazers on October 22, 2013. In November 2013, he was acquired by the Idaho Stampede as an affiliate player.

On February 13, 2014, Bost was named to the Prospects All-Star team for the 2014 NBA D-League All-Star Game, as a replacement for Jarvis Varnado.

=== Trotamundos de Carabobo (2014) ===
On April 21, 2014, Bost signed with Trotamundos de Carabobo for the 2014 LPB season.

=== Trabzonspor (2014–2015) ===
In July 2014, Bost joined the Indiana Pacers for the 2014 NBA Summer League. On August 15, 2014, he signed with the Utah Jazz. However, he was later waived by the Jazz on October 10, 2014. On October 24, 2014, he signed with Trabzonspor of Turkey for the 2014–15 season.

=== Stelmet Zielona Góra (2015–2016) ===
On August 7, 2015, Bost signed with Stelmet Zielona Góra of Poland for the 2015–16 season.

=== AS Monaco Basket (2016–2017) ===
On July 2, 2016, Bost signed with AS Monaco Basket for the 2016–17 season.

=== Žalgiris Kaunas (2017) ===
On July 1, 2017, Bost signed with Lithuanian club Žalgiris Kaunas. On December 11, 2017, he parted ways with Žalgiris after averaging 6 points per game in LKL and 2 points per game in EuroLeague.

=== SIG Strasbourg (2017–2018) ===
On December 12, 2017, Bost signed with French club SIG Strasbourg.

=== BC Khimki (2018–2019) ===
On July 12, 2018, Bost signed with BC Khimki a one-year contract. On February 27, 2019, Bost was officially released by the Russian team after having averages of 7,9 points and 2 assists in the EuroLeague, and 8 points and 3,6 assists in the VTB United League.

=== Return to Monaco (2019–2021) ===
On July 12, 2019, it was announced that Bost had returned to AS Monaco Basket.

=== Galatasaray Nef (2021–2023) ===
On August 11, 2021, Bost signed with Galatasaray Nef of the Basketball Super League.

On 19 January 2023, his contract with Galatasaray Nef was mutually terminated. In the statement made by the club, a thank you message was published.

=== ASVEL (2023) ===
On January 16, 2023, he signed with ASVEL of the French LNB Pro A.

=== Metropolitans 92 (2023) ===
On September 26, 2023, Bost signed a 2-months contract with Metropolitans 92 of the LNB Pro A for replacing injured Jordan Theodore.

=== Return to Galatasaray (2023–2024) ===
On October 28, 2023, he signed with Galatasaray Ekmas for a second stint.

=== Indios de Mayagüez (2024) ===
On June 2, 2024, he signed with Indios de Mayagüez of the Baloncesto Superior Nacional (BSN).

=== Tindastóll (2026-present) ===
In June 2026, Bost signed with Tindastóll of the Icelandic Úrvalsdeild.

== Career statistics ==
Legend
GP	Games played	GS	Games started	MPG	Minutes per game
FG%	Field-goal percentage	3P%	3-point field-goal percentage	FT%	Free-throw percentage
RPG	Rebounds per game	APG	Assists per game	SPG	Steals per game
BPG	Blocks per game	PPG	Points per game	PIR	Performance index rating
**Bold**	Career high

=== EuroLeague ===
Year	Team	GP	GS	MPG	FG%	3P%	FT%	RPG	APG	SPG	BPG	PPG	PIR
2015–16	Zielona Góra	10	0	22.5	.341	.158	.769	1.6	3.5	**1.4**	.0	8.4	7.6
2017–18	Žalgiris	6	0	7.5	.333	.200	**1.000**	1.0	1.3	.2	.0	2.2	2.3
2018–19	Khimki	**23**	**23**	23.3	**.404**	**.337**	.789	**2.3**	3.0	1.0	.0	7.9	7.7
2022–23	ASVEL	15	15	**25.9**	.308	.297	.733	2.1	**4.3**	1.2	**.1**	**8.9**	**8.3**
Career		54	38	22.4	.356	.290	.772	2.0	3.3	1.0	.1	7.6	7.3
