= Tofaş Nilüfer Spor Salonu =

Indoor arena in Nilüfer, Bursa, Turkey

Tofaş Spor Salonu
- Tofaş Sports Hall
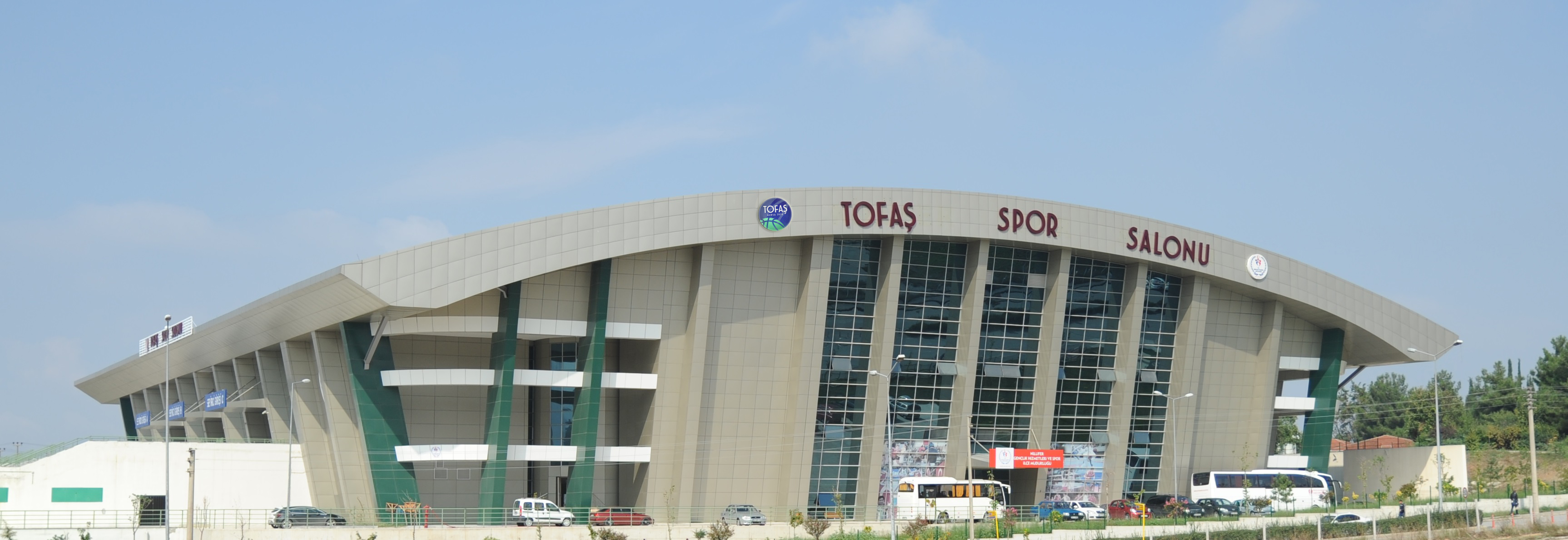
- Interactive map of Tofaş Spor Salonu
- Full name: Tofaş Nilüfer Spor Salonu
- Location: Fethiye Mahallesi, Nilüfer Hatun Cd. No:133, 16140, Nilüfer, Bursa, Turkey
- Capacity: Basketball: 7,500

Construction
- Opened: 19 March 2014
- Cost: $16 million (2014)

Tenants
- Tofaş (2015–present); Bursaspor (2019–present)

Tofaş Nilüfer Spor Salonu, or Tofaş Nilüfer Sports Hall, is a multi-purpose indoor arena that is located in Nilüfer, Bursa, Turkey. The arena has a seating capacity of 7,500 people for basketball games.

== History ==
Tofaş Nilüfer Spor Salonu was opened on 19 March 2014. The arena has been used as the home arena of the professional basketball clubs, Tofaş Bursa and Bursaspor, of the Turkish Super League (BSL).

== See also ==
- List of indoor arenas in Turkey
