= Kerry Blackshear Jr. =

American basketball player (born 1997)

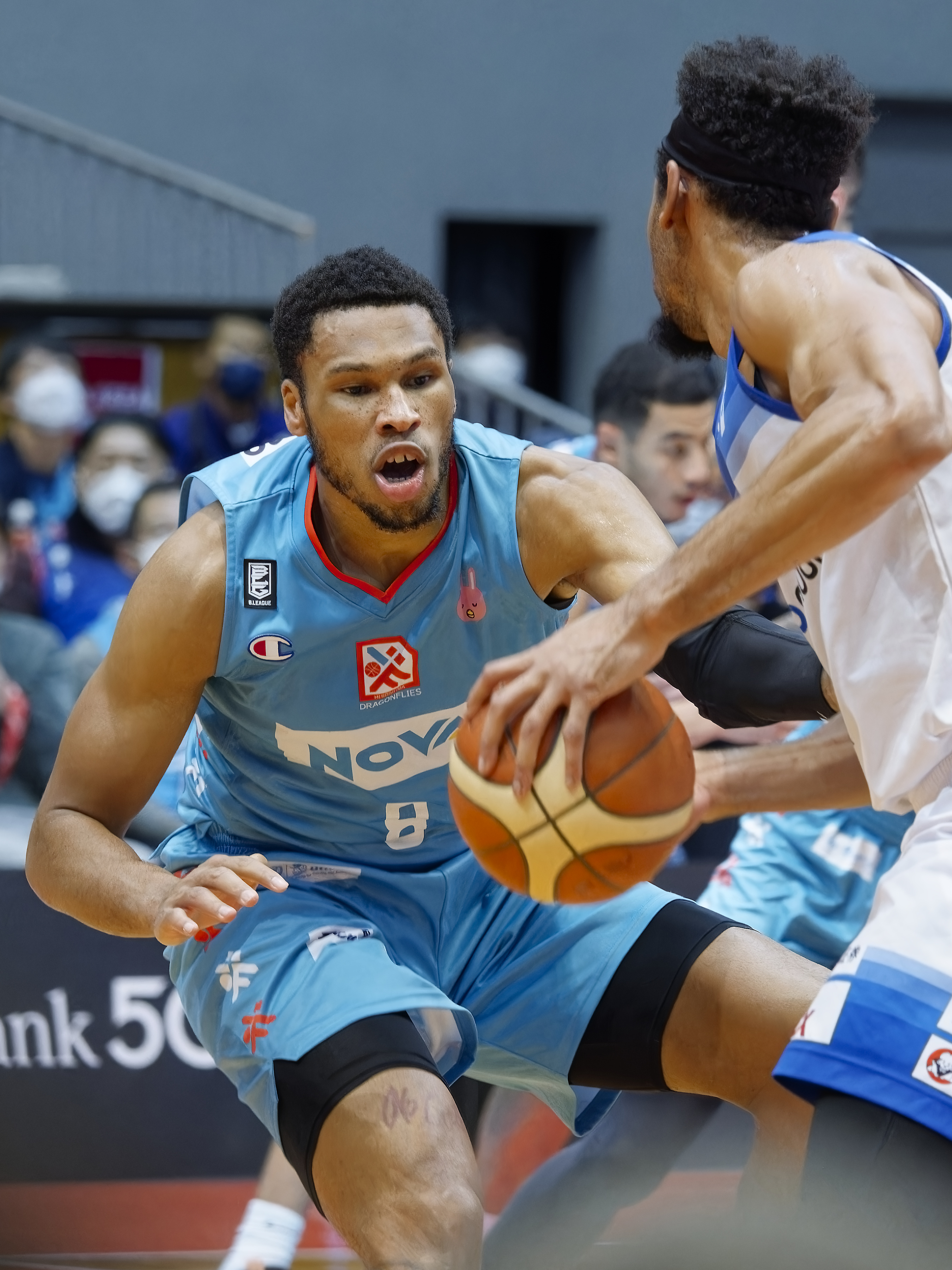
- Blackshear with the Hiroshima Dragonflies in 2022

No. 8 – Hiroshima Dragonflies
- Position: Power forward
- League: B.League

Personal information
- Born: January 28, 1997 (age 29) Orlando, Florida, U.S.
- Listed height: 6 ft 10 in (2.08 m)
- Listed weight: 241 lb (109 kg)

Career information
- High school: Maynard Evans (Orlando, Florida)
- College: Virginia Tech (2015–2019); Florida (2019–2020)
- NBA draft: 2020: undrafted
- Playing career: 2020–present

Career history
- 2020–2021: Hapoel Gilboa Galil
- 2021–2022: Galatasaray Nef
- 2022–2025: Hiroshima Dragonflies
- 2025–present: Gunma Crane Thunders

Career highlights
- B1 League champion (2024); Second-team All-SEC (2020); Second-team All-ACC (2019)

Kerry Devon Blackshear Jr. (born January 28, 1997) is an American professional basketball player for Gunma Crane Thunders of the B.League. He played college basketball for the Virginia Tech Hokies and the Florida Gators.

== Early life ==
Blackshear's father, Kerry Blackshear Sr., played in college at Stetson, where he was the second-leading scorer in program history and the 1994–95 Atlantic Sun Player of the Year before embarking on a professional career. His mother, Lamilia Ford Blackshear, is the third-leading rebounder for the Stetson women. By the time the younger Blackshear reached high school at Maynard Evans in Orlando, Florida, he had been raised around the world and his game resembled a European big man. Blackshear was regarded as a four-star prospect in the 2015 class, ranked by 247Sports as the 25th ranked power forward and 88th overall player.

== College career ==
=== Virginia Tech ===
As a freshman at Virginia Tech, Blackshear posted 6.2 points per game off the bench. He was forced to redshirt his sophomore season due to a foot injury. Blackshear averaged 12.5 points and 5.9 rebounds per game as a redshirt sophomore for Virginia Tech.

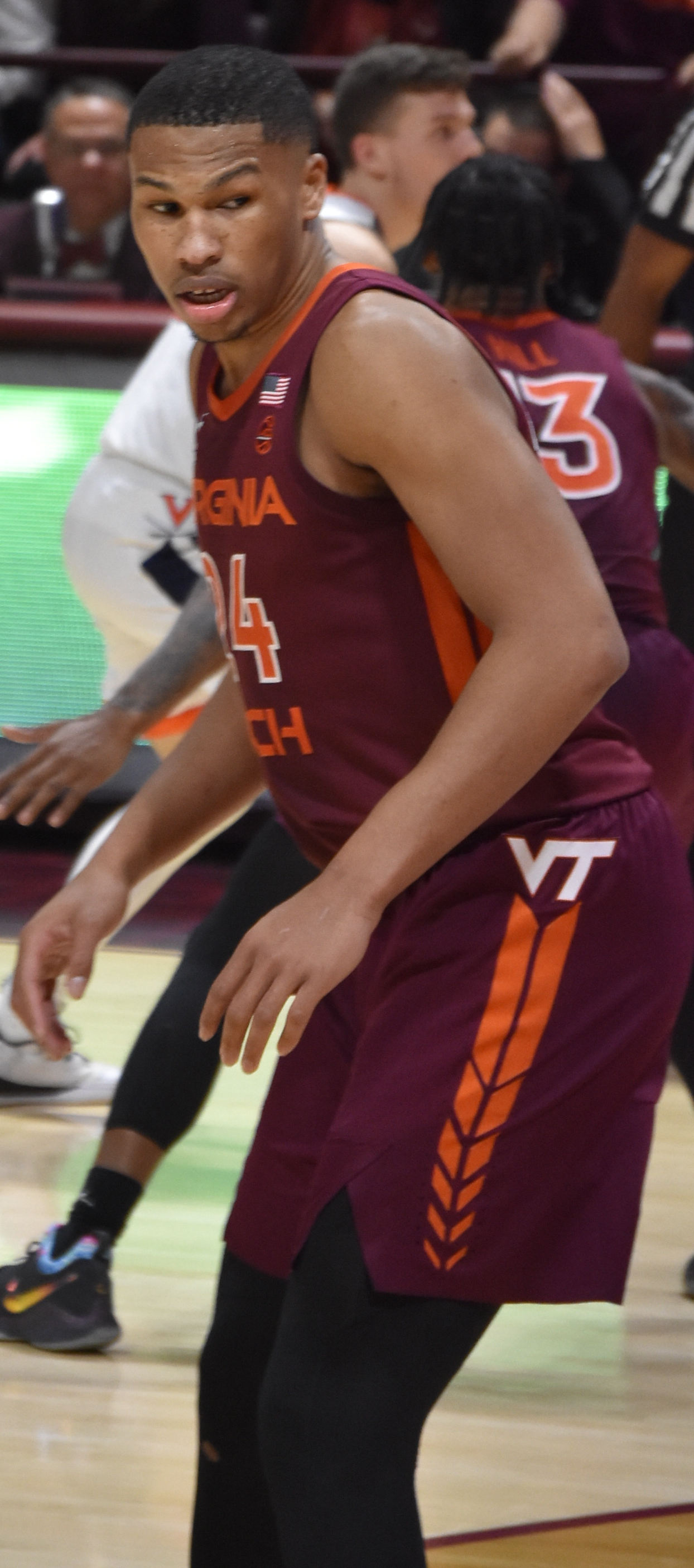
Blackshear in 2019

After roommate Justin Robinson went down with a foot injury on January 30, 2019, Blackshear picked up his production, scoring 29 points and grabbing nine rebounds in a win at Pittsburgh. As a junior, Blackshear averaged 14.9 points, 7.5 rebounds and 2.4 assists per game, shooting 50.8% from the field and 33.3% from behind the arc. He was named to the Second Team All-ACC. Blackshear helped lead Virginia Tech to the Sweet 16 of the NCAA Tournament, contributing 18 points, 16 rebounds, five assists and two blocks in a narrow defeat to Duke. After the season he declared for the 2019 NBA draft. Blackshear withdrew from the draft shortly before the deadline but announced he was transferring from Virginia Tech. On June 26, 2019, he announced he would play at Florida in his final season of eligibility.

=== Florida ===
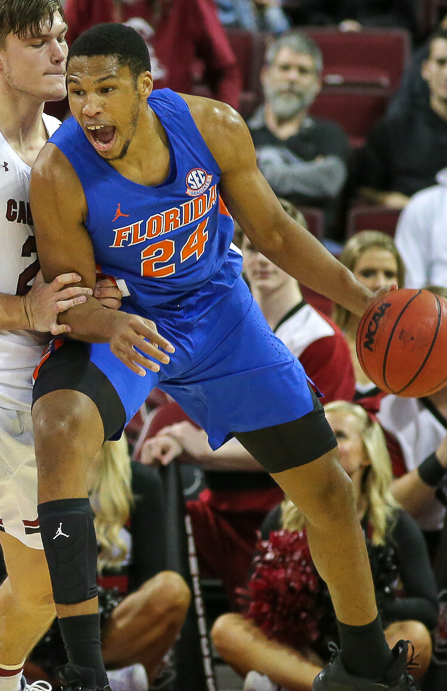
Blackshear in January 2020

In his first game in a Florida uniform, Blackshear had 20 points and 10 rebounds as the Gators defeated North Florida 74–59. On January 4, 2020, Blackshear scored 24 points and had 16 rebounds in a 104–98 win over Alabama in double overtime, during which Florida overcame a 21-point deficit, the largest comeback in school history. Blackshear sprained his left wrist during the season finale versus Kentucky. He averaged 12.8 points and 7.5 rebounds per game at Florida. At the conclusion of the regular season, Blackshear was named to the Second Team All-SEC.

== Professional career ==
On August 9, 2020, Blackshear signed with Hapoel Gilboa Galil of the Israeli Premier League.

On August 24, 2021, he signed a one-year deal with Galatasaray Nef of the Turkish Basketbol Süper Ligi (BSL), with the option of an additional season.

On July 12, 2022, Blackshear signed with Hiroshima Dragonflies of the B.League. On May 24, 2023, he re- signed with Hiroshima Dragonflies. On June 6, 2024, he re- signed with Hiroshima Dragonflies.

On Juny 19, 2025, Blackshear signed with Gunma Crane Thunders of the B.League.

== Career statistics ==
Legend
GP	Games played	GS	Games started	MPG	Minutes per game
FG%	Field goal percentage	3P%	3-point field goal percentage	FT%	Free throw percentage
RPG	Rebounds per game	APG	Assists per game	SPG	Steals per game
BPG	Blocks per game	PPG	Points per game	**Bold**	Career high

=== College ===
Year	Team	GP	GS	MPG	FG%	3P%	FT%	RPG	APG	SPG	BPG	PPG
2015–16	Virginia Tech	**35**	5	19.2	.553	.235	.558	4.5	.6	.5	.4	6.2
2016–17	Virginia Tech	Redshirt										
2017–18	Virginia Tech	33	32	25.2	**.558**	.306	.747	5.9	1.2	**.8**	**.9**	12.5
2018–19	Virginia Tech	**35**	**35**	**30.0**	.508	**.333**	.736	**7.5**	**2.4**	.7	.8	**14.9**
2019–20	Florida	31	31	27.2	.436	.305	**.792**	**7.5**	1.6	.6	.6	12.8
Career		134	103	25.3	.509	.308	.731	6.3	1.4	.6	.7	11.6
