= Karataş Şahinbey Sport Hall =

Indoor sport venue in Gaziantep, Turkey

- Karataş Şahinbey Spor Salonu
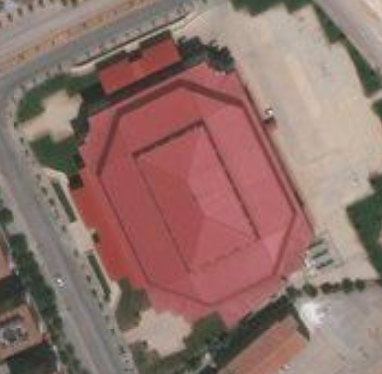
- Interactive map of Karataş Şahinbey Sport Hall
- Location: Gaziantep, Turkey
- Coordinates: 37.020870°N 37.345474°E
- Owner: Gaziantep Gençlik Hizmetleri ve Spor İl Müdürlüğü
- Capacity: 6,400

Construction
- Opened: 2010; 16 years ago

Tenant
- Gaziantep Basketbol

Karataş Şahinbey Sport Hall (Turkish: Karataş Şahinbey Spor Salonu) is an indoor multi-purpose sport venue that is located in the Gaziantep, Turkey. Opened in 2010, the hall has a seating capacity of 6,400 spectators. It is home to Gaziantep Basketbol, which plays currently in the Turkish Basketball League.

It was the venue for the 2014-15 Turkish Cup Basketball play-offs.
