= 2026 Turkish Basketball Federation Cup =

- Season: 2025–26
- Duration: 13–18 January
- Games played: 7
- Teams: 8
- TV partner: HT Spor

Finals
- Champions: Çayırova Belediyespor
- Runners-up: Konya BB

Awards
- Final MVP: (United States) Nysier Brooks

The 2026 Turkish Basketball Federation Cup (Turkish: 2026 Basketbol Erkekler Federasyon Kupası), also known as Türkiye Sigorta Erkekler Federasyon Kupası for sponsorship reasons, was the 12th edition of Turkey's second-tier level professional national domestic basketball cup competition. The quarterfinals of tournament were hold from 13 and 14 January 2026 in 4 different locations, followed by the semi-finals and the final held from 16 to 18 February 2026 at the Basketball Development Center in Istanbul, Turkey.

Çayırova Belediyespor won the title.

== Qualified teams ==
The top eight placed teams after the first half of the second-tier level Türkiye Basketbol Ligi 2025–26 season qualified for the tournament. The four highest-placed teams played against the lowest-seeded teams in the quarter-finals. The competition will be played under a single elimination format.

Pos	Team	Pld	W	L	PF	PA	PD	Pts	Seeding
1	Gaziantep Basketbol	17	15	2	1416	1196	+220	32	Seeded
2	Çayırova Belediyespor	17	14	3	1430	1238	+192	31	Seeded
3	Bandırma Bordo	17	14	3	1290	1107	+183	31	Seeded
4	Konya BB	17	14	3	1317	1147	+170	31	Seeded
5	Göztepe	17	13	4	1252	1207	+45	30	Unseeded
6	OGM Ormanspor	17	11	6	1346	1266	+80	28	Unseeded
7	TED Ankara Kolejliler	17	8	9	1310	1285	+25	25	Unseeded
8	Darüşşafaka	17	8	9	1246	1264	−18	25	Unseeded

Source: TBL

== Draw ==
The 2026 Turkish Basketball Federation Cup was drawn on 30 December 2025. The seeded teams were paired in the quarterfinals with the non-seeded teams.

== Bracket ==
Quarterfinals; 13–14 January
1	Gaziantep Basketbol	86
5	Göztepe	66
8	Darüşşafaka	62
4	Konya BB	86
2	Çayırova Belediyespor	87
6	OGM Ormanspor	86
3	Bandırma Bordo	77
7	TED Ankara Kolejliler	63

Semifinals; 16 January
1	Gaziantep Basketbol	59
4	Konya BB	70
2	Çayırova Belediyespor	80
3	Bandırma Bordo	70

Final; 18 January
4	Konya BB	52
2	Çayırova Belediyespor	70

== Quarterfinals ==
Note: All times are TRT (UTC+3) as listed by Turkish Basketball Federation.

13 January 2026 QF	Gaziantep Basketbol	86–66	Göztepe	Gaziantep
17:30	Scoring by quarter: 10–16, 25–18, 30–19, 21–13
	Pts: Aydın 20; Rebs: Yücedağ 13; Asts: İlter 6 PIR: Yücedağ 30	Boxscore	Pts: Gueye 19; Rebs: Gueye 11; Asts: Barnes 4 PIR: Gueye 31	Arena: Karataş Şahinbey Sport Hall; Attendance: 1,350; Referees: Fatih Güler, İsmail Binbir, Erhan Erdoğan

13 January 2026 QF	Darüşşafaka	62–86	Konya BB	Istanbul
19:30	Scoring by quarter: 16–22, 9–27, 18–16, 19–21
	Pts: Zečević 14; Rebs: Zečević 6 Asts: Aydoğan 5 PIR: Zečević 13	Boxscore	Pts: Karahan 15; Rebs: Coffey 14; Asts: Havsa, Karahan 5 PIR: Coffey 24	Arena: Ayhan Şahenk Sports Hall; Attendance: 212; Referees: Ozan Gönen, Erdoğan Çelebi, Halil Ata Günal

14 January 2026 QF	Çayırova Belediyespor	87–86	OGM Ormanspor	Çayırova
17:30	Scoring by quarter: 26–27, 28–25, 20–16, 13–18
	Pts: Brooks 27; Rebs: Brooks 10; Asts: Candan 5 PIR: Brooks 33	Boxscore	Pts: Wright 21; Rebs: Uzunhasan 11; Asts: Wright 6 PIR: Wright 24	Arena: Çayırova Sports Hall; Attendance: 600; Referees: Mesut Öztürk, Abdullah Koputan, Yasin Alkan

14 January 2026 QF	Bandırma Bordo	77–63	TED Ankara Kolejliler	Bandırma
19:30	Scoring by quarter: 17–13, 22–16, 27–15, 11–19
	Pts: Kızıl 15; Rebs: Kızıl 8 Asts: Gordon 5 PIR: Sarıkaya 22	Boxscore	Pts: Erülkü, İvedi 14; Rebs: İvedi 7 Asts: three players 3 PIR: İvedi 17	Arena: Bandırma Onyedi Eylül University Arena; Attendance: 815; Referees: Berk Kurtulmuş, Ahmet Kemal Digilli, Hasan Kamil Takınyalıoğlu

== Semifinals ==
Note: All times are TRT (UTC+3) as listed by Turkish Basketball Federation.

16 January 2026 SF	Gaziantep Basketbol	59–70	Konya BB	Istanbul
17:00	Scoring by quarter: 16–21, 14–20, 16–7, 13–22
	Pts: Nenadić 13; Rebs: Yücedağ 10; Asts: three players 2 PIR: Aydın 11	Boxscore	Pts: Karahan 17; Rebs: Coffey 13; Asts: Ayça 4 PIR: Coffey 26	Arena: Basketball Development Center; Attendance: 350; Referees: Önder Yılmaz, Orkun Yurttaş, İsmail Arslan

16 January 2026 SF	Çayırova Belediyespor	80–70	Bandırma Bordo	Istanbul
20:00	Scoring by quarter: 23–19, 20–16, 23–14, 14–21
	Pts: Gallinat 25; Rebs: Brooks 17; Asts: Al 6 PIR: Brooks 26	Boxscore	Pts: Gordon 22; Rebs: Kızıl 7 Asts: Gordon 5 PIR: Gordon 19	Arena: Basketball Development Center; Attendance: 450; Referees: Ahmet Taner İbin, Yiğit Gönültaş, Mehmet Burak Anlatıcı

== Final ==
Nysier Brooks was named the Most Valuable Player of the final.

18 January 2026 F	Konya BB	52–70	Çayırova Belediyespor	Istanbul
18:30 TRT (UTC+3)	Scoring by quarter: 13–16, 19–15, 12–12, 8–27
	Pts: Havsa, Birer 10; Rebs: Birer 10; Asts: Baykan, Karahan 3 PIR: Birer 15	Boxscore	Pts: Gallinat 16; Rebs: Brooks 8 Asts: Al 6 PIR: Brooks 20	Arena: Basketball Development Center; Attendance: 697; Referees: Ahmet Taner İbin, Yiğit Gönültaş, İsmail Arslan

Starters:			Pts	Reb	Ast
PG	24	(Turkey) Ege Havsa	10	3	2
SG	33	(Turkey) Alp Karahan	8	3	3
SF	9	(Turkey) Oğulcan Baykan	0	4	3
PF	12	(Turkey) Tolga Kaan Birer	10	10	1
C	3	(United States) Chris Coffey	8	5	1
Reserves:					
C	0	(Turkey) Yiğit Elgün	0	0	0
G	2	(Turkey) Furkan Ayça	9	2	2
F	11	(Turkey) Eren Deniz	DNP		
G	20	(Turkey) Enes Bayraktar	7	1	0
F	26	(Turkey) Nihat Atalan	0	5	0
Head coach:
(Turkish Basketball Federation) Volkan Ertetik

Konya	Çayırova

Konya	Statistics	Çayırova
11/32 (34.4%)	2-pt field goals	15/36 (41.7%)
5/18 (27.8%)	3-pt field goals	6/25 (24%)
15/20 (75%)	Free throws	22/29 (75.9%)
11	Offensive rebounds	14
26	Defensive rebounds	23
37	Total rebounds	37
12	Assists	18
19	Turnovers	9
5	Steals	13
4	Blocks	2
27	Fouls	22

2026 Turkish Basketball Federation Cup champions
Çayırova Belediyespor
(1st title)

Starters:			Pts	Reb	Ast
PG	9	(Turkey) Ömer Utku Al	3	4	6
SG	2	(United States) Roberto Gallinat	16	2	1
SF	6	(Turkey) Erdi Gülaslan	5	3	0
PF	15	(Turkey) Hakan Yapar	5	2	3
C	11	(United States) Nysier Brooks	15	8	1
Reserves:					
G	0	(Turkey) Yusuf Selim Şentürk	DNP		
G	5	(Turkey) Doğukan Şanlı	0	0	0
G	20	(Turkey) Arca Tülüoğlu	2	2	3
SF	23	(Turkey) Fırat Alemdaroğlu	0	3	0
PF	32	(Turkey) Berkay Candan	9	2	0
C	34	(Turkey) Deniz Kılıçlı	7	5	0
PG	44	(Turkey) Can Uğur Öğüt	8	2	4
Head coach:
(Turkish Basketball Federation) Ender Arslan

== See also ==
- 2025–26 Türkiye Basketbol Ligi
