= 2025–26 Türkiye Basketbol Ligi =

Basketball league in Turkey

Türkiye Basketbol Ligi
- Season: 2025–26
- Dates: 19 September 2025 – 24 May 2026
- Games played: 306 + Playoffs
- Teams: 18

Regular season
- Champions: Çayırova Belediyespor (1st title)
- Promoted: Çayırova Belediyespor; Bandırma Bordo
- Relegated: Kocaeli BB Kağıtspor; Yalovaspor

Records
- Biggest home win: Gaziantep 97–61 Göztepe (12 October 2025); Bandırma Bordo 103–67 Göztepe (5 January 2026)
- Biggest away win: Final Spor 77–112 Gaziantep (16 October 2025)
- Highest scoring: Göztepe 121–119 OGM Ormanspor (2 May 2026)

The 2025–26 Türkiye Basketbol Ligi was the 57th season of the Turkish Basketball League (Turkish: Türkiye Basketbol Ligi), the second-level professional club men's basketball league in Turkey.

== Teams ==
Before the league fixture draw, Çağdaş Bodrumspor announced their withdrawal from the league. As a result of this, 17 teams were included in the initial fixture draw. On 19 August 2025, the Turkish Basketball Federation announced the commencement of an additional participation process for the Turkish Basketball League . During the fixture draw held at the Basketball Development Center on 20 August 2025, it was stated that the 18th team would be determined in the near future. The final team admitted to the league was Kocaeli Büyükşehir Belediye Kağıtspor.

=== Venues ===
Locations of the 2025–26 Türkiye Basketbol Ligi clubs
Istanbul Türkiye Basketbol Ligi clubs

Team	Location	Stadium	Capacity
Balıkesir Büyükşehir Belediyespor	Balıkesir	Kurtdereli Spor Salonu	1,500
Bandırma Bordo B.K.	Balıkesir (Bandırma)	Bandırma 17 Eylül University Arena	3,500
Cemefe Gold Haremspor	Istanbul (Beylikdüzü)	Beylikdüzü Spor Salonu	2,500
Çayırova Belediyespor	Çayırova (Kocaeli)	Çayırova Spor Salonu	3,500
Darüşşafaka Lassa	Istanbul (Sarıyer)	Ayhan Şahenk Spor Salonu	3,500
Fenerbahçe Koleji	Istanbul (Ataşehir)	Metro Enerji Sports Hall	2,500
Final	Bursa	Tofaş Nilüfer Sports Hall	7,500
Gaziantep Basketbol	Gaziantep	Karataş Şahinbey Sport Hall	6,400
Göztepe	İzmir	Altındağ Atatürk Spor Kompleksi	1,920
İlab Basketbol	Istanbul (Beşiktaş)	Akatlar Arena	3,200
Kocaeli BB Kağıtspor	İzmit	Kocaeli Atatürk Spor Salonu	1,800
KİPAŞ İstiklalspor	Kahramanmaraş	Kahramanmaraş Merkez Spor Kompleksi	2,500
Ankaragücü	Ankara	Hidayet Türkoğlu Spor Salonu	4,250
OGM Ormanspor	Ankara	M. Sait Zarifoğlu Spor Salonu	2,000
Pizzabulls Cedi Osman Basketbol	Istanbul (Büyükçekmece)	Gazanfer Bilge Spor Salonu	2,500
TED Ankara Kolejliler	Ankara	Gölbaşı Spor Salonu	
Yalovaspor	Yalova	90. Yıl Spor Salonu	2,500

== Regular season ==
=== League table ===
Pos	Team	Pld	W	L	PF	PA	PD	Pts	Qualification or relegation
1	Çayırova Belediyespor (C)	34	29	5	2860	2446	+414	63	Promotion to Basketbol Süper Ligi
2	Parmos Otel Bandırma Bordo (P)	34	27	7	2648	2276	+372	61	Advance to playoffs
3	Gaziantep Basketbol	34	27	7	2792	2421	+371	61	Advance to playoffs
4	Konya BB	34	23	11	2647	2428	+219	57	Advance to playoffs
5	OGM Ormanspor	34	22	12	2698	2579	+119	56	Advance to playoffs
6	Göztepe	34	21	13	2614	2538	+76	55	Advance to playoffs
7	Fenerbahçe Koleji	34	19	15	2709	2679	+30	53	Advance to playoffs
8	KİPAŞ İstiklalspor	34	16	18	2659	2711	−52	50	Advance to play-in
9	Bulls Yatırım TED Ankara Kolejliler	34	16	18	2687	2684	+3	50	Advance to play-in
10	Pizzabulls Cedi Osman Basketbol	34	15	19	2665	2669	−4	49	Advance to play-in
11	Darüşşafaka Lassa	34	14	20	2486	2629	−143	48	Advance to play-in
12	Ankaragücü	34	14	20	2501	2632	−131	48	
13	İlab Basketbol	34	13	21	2631	2713	−82	47	
14	Cemefe Gold Haremspor	34	13	21	2601	2687	−86	47	
15	Balıkesir Büyükşehir Belediyespor	34	13	21	2490	2669	−179	47	
16	Finalspor	34	12	22	2438	2551	−113	46	
17	Kocaeli BB Kağıtspor (R)	34	12	22	2503	2637	−134	46	Relegation to TB2L
18	Yalovaspor (R)	34	0	34	0	680	−680	−2	Relegation to TB2L

Source: Türkiye Basketbol Ligi
(C) Champions; (P) Promoted; (R) Relegated

=== Results ===
Home \ Away	ANK	BAL	BAN	CAY	DSK	FBK	FIN	GAZ	GOZ	HAR	ILB	IST	KOC	KON	ORM	PIZ	TED	YAL
Ankaragücü	—	79–75	78–86	65–81	79–73	72–75	77–70	72–87	84–64	78–92	81–74	68–85	82–73	84–80	91–95	58–59	85–98	20–0
Balıkesir Büyükşehir Belediyespor	68–74	—	76–68	82–99	86–76	72–88	82–72	66–77	65–80	101–99	78–82	77–81	90–88	71–70	83–100	98–94	82–80	20–0
Bandırma Bordo	81–67	75–58	—	63–77	86–57	71–61	81–64	89–70	103–67	84–77	80–71	99–86	82–65	85–83	83–77	82–70	83–69	20–0
Çayırova Belediyespor	96–72	99–70	72–70	—	89–58	93–86	87–81	96–93	87–78	86–80	103–76	90–86	102–71	70–72	87–61	83–92	95–67	20–0
Darüşşafaka Lassa	102–92	84–71	59–74	69–82	—	92–82	97–85	68–101	64–80	72–79	77–62	84–76	67–65	69–94	80–88	96–83	110–105	20–0
Fenerbahçe Koleji	67–73	91–90	80–75	73–100	95–92	—	74–56	86–82	81–96	85–92	97–71	94–89	100–92	94–98	97–84	89–72	105–109	20–0
Final Spor	69–80	71–56	63–90	67–77	62–86	65–67	—	77–112	89–92	88–60	91–72	79–77	77–65	72–83	77–82	88–89	75–72	20–0
Gaziantep Basketbol	102–73	89–75	73–86	95–73	80–74	90–79	86–65	—	97–61	89–76	83–73	84–58	79–67	81–71	80–86	70–57	95–70	20–0
Göztepe	94–81	91–82	77–70	84–88	73–77	95–79	67–63	65–77	—	75–70	60–66	77–72	85–66	86–69	77–74	83–72	72–78	20–0
Cemefe Gold Haremspor	80–87	82–76	63–86	73–82	70–86	78–70	83–80	83–87	91–111	—	95–86	86–76	67–73	74–86	66–82	87–66	87–81	20–0
İlab Basketbol	79–71	93–69	85–91	67–97	85–77	90–93	81–85	77–80	85–87	93–89	—	88–92	103–96	84–77	92–91	94–74	81–96	20–0
KİPAŞ İstiklalspor	90–96	70–83	75–99	75–92	75–70	95–96	67–70	103–97	91–87	84–83	89–83	—	95–72	72–71	65–96	97–81	89–84	20–0
Kocaeli BB Kağıtspor	82–69	96–81	61–82	80–82	83–65	73–84	85–80	69–75	91–82	99–97	79–89	80–79	—	65–75	67–74	93–78	63–84	20–0
Konya BB	86–70	78–56	66–87	86–84	84–55	77–71	97–101	84–79	58–65	94–68	81–77	94–68	77–71	—	81–70	83–81	85–74	20–0
OGM Ormanspor	84–71	84–63	71–64	72–79	73–68	78–94	83–76	94–102	91–90	81–77	78–70	100–83	92–76	62–88	—	96–85	93–96	20–0
Pizzabulls Cedi Osman Basketbol	107–83	78–79	75–64	95–106	109–75	86–56	74–77	76–81	91–86	89–75	83–79	76–100	81–69	86–96	92–80	—	94–85	20–0
TED Ankara Kolejliler	78–69	81–89	83–89	87–86	81–67	81–80	70–63	72–79	86–87	74–82	93–83	75–79	82–88	96–83	79–86	81–80	—	20–0
Yalovaspor	0–20	0–20	0–20	0–20	0–20	0–20	0–20	0–20	0–20	0–20	0–20	0–20	0–20	0–20	0–20	0–20	0–20	—

Source: Türkiye Basketbol Ligi
Legend: Blue = home team win; Red = away team win.
Matches with lighter background shading were decided after overtime.

== Play-in ==
Under the new format, the 8th to 11th-ranked teams faced each other in the play-in. Each game is hosted by the team with the higher regular season record. The format was similar to the first two rounds of the Page–McIntyre system for a four-team playoff that was identical to that of the NBA play-in tournament. First, the 8th seed will host the 9th seed, with the winner advancing to the playoffs as the 7th seed; likewise the 10th seed will host the 11th seed, with the loser eliminated. Then the loser of the 8-v-9 game will host the winner of the 10-v-11 game, with the winner of that game getting the final playoff spot, as the 9th seed.

Play-in games
8	KİPAŞ İstiklalspor	79
9	Bulls Yatırım TED Ankara Kolejliler	72
10	Pizzabulls Cedi Osman Basketbol	84
11	Darüşşafaka Lassa	80

No. 9 seed game
9	Bulls Yatırım TED Ankara Kolejliler	97
10	Pizzabulls Cedi Osman Basketbol	88

Final seeds
KİPAŞ İstiklalspor	No. 8 seed
Bulls Yatırım TED Ankara Kolejliler	No. 9 seed

== Playoffs ==
Quarterfinals and semifinals will be played best-of-three format (1–1–1) and finals will be played in a best-of-five format (2–2–1).

=== Bracket ===
Quarterfinals
2	Parmos Otel Bandırma Bordo	2
9	Bulls Yatırım TED Ankara Kolejliler	0
5	OGM Ormanspor	0
6	Göztepe	2
3	Gaziantep Basketbol	2
8	KİPAŞ İstiklalspor	1
4	Konya BB	2
7	Fenerbahçe Koleji	1

Semifinals
2	Parmos Otel Bandırma Bordo	2
6	Göztepe	1
3	Gaziantep Basketbol	2
4	Konya BB	1

Finals
2	Parmos Otel Bandırma Bordo	3
3	Gaziantep Basketbol	0

=== Quarterfinals ===
Team 1	Series	Team 2	Game 1	Game 2	Game 3
Parmos Otel Bandırma Bordo	2–0	Bulls Yatırım TED Ankara Kolejliler	93–70	85–54	—
Gaziantep Basketbol	2–1	KİPAŞ İstiklalspor	77–82	74–64	90–78
Konya BB	2–1	Fenerbahçe Koleji	102–80	93–98	91–63
OGM Ormanspor	0–2	Göztepe	90–92	119–121	—

=== Semifinals ===
Team 1	Series	Team 2	Game 1	Game 2	Game 3
Parmos Otel Bandırma Bordo	2–1	Göztepe	84–76	71–73	82–65
Gaziantep Basketbol	2–1	Konya BB	80–71	78–82	98–96

=== Finals ===
Team 1	Series	Team 2	Game 1	Game 2	Game 3	Game 4	Game 5
Parmos Otel Bandırma Bordo	3–0	Gaziantep Basketbol	83–62	75–67	79–65	—	—

== Awards ==
All official awards of the 2025–26 Türkiye Basketbol Ligi.

=== MVP of the Round ===
Gameday	Player	Team	EFF	Ref.
1	(United States) Chris Warren	TED Ankara Kolejliler	32	
2	(United States) Diante Watkins	KİPAŞ İstiklalspor	40	
3	(Turkey) Baran Avşar	Balıkesir BB	30	
4	(United States) Chris Coffey	Konya BB	33	
6	(United States) Keshun Sherrill	Kocaeli BB Kağıtspor	36	
7	(United States) Brandon Tabb	Cemefe Gold Haremspor	26	
8	(Serbia) Aleksandar Zečević	Darüşşafaka Lassa	38	
9	(Turkey) Yiğit Hamza Mestoğlu	Fenerbahçe Koleji	34	
10	(Serbia) Nemanja Nenadić	Gaziantep Basketbol	35	
11	(United States) Julien Ducree	Pizzabulls Cedi Osman Basketbol	30	
12	(United States) Marquis Wright	OGM Ormanspor	29	
13	(Turkey) Hakan Yapar	Çayırova Belediyespor	30	
14	(Turkey) Okben Ulubay	Bandırma Bordo	33	
15	(United States) Holland Woods	Fenerbahçe Koleji	41	
16	(Turkey) Tayfun Erülkü	TED Ankara Kolejliler	28	
17	(United States) TreVion Crews	İlab Basketbol	33	
18	(United States) Brandon Walters	TED Ankara Kolejliler	36	
19	(Turkey) Okben Ulubay (x2)	Bandırma Bordo	37	
20	(United States) Ty Gordon	Bandırma Bordo	36	
21	(Turkey) Faruk Biberović	Fenerbahçe Koleji	28	
22	(United States) Brandon Walters (x2)	TED Ankara Kolejliler	44	
23	(United States) Roberto Gallinat	Çayırova Belediyespor	34	
24	(Turkey) Göktürk Gökalp Ural	Kocaeli BB Kağıtspor	31	
25	(France) Bruno Cingala-Mata	Cemefe Gold Haremspor	34	
26	(United States) Diante Watkins (x2)	KİPAŞ İstiklalspor	35	
27	(Senegal) Abdoulaye Gueye	Göztepe	56	
28	(United States) Jordan Barnes	Göztepe	35	
29	(United States) Nysier Brooks	Çayırova Belediyespor	44	
30	(Turkey) Okben Ulubay (x3)	Bandırma Bordo	38	
31	(United States) Julien Ducree (x2)	Pizzabulls Cedi Osman Basketbol	39	
32	(Senegal) Abdoulaye Gueye (x2)	Göztepe	42	
33	(United States) Kahlil Dukes	Balıkesir BB	29	
34	(Turkey) Burak Gözeneli	KİPAŞ İstiklalspor	37	
