= 2019–20 Basketbol Süper Ligi =

Basketball league in Turkey

Basketbol Süper Ligi
- Season: 2019–20
- Dates: 28 September 2019 – 18 March 2020
- Games played: 183
- Teams: 16

Regular season
- EuroLeague: Anadolu Efes; Fenerbahçe Beko
- EuroCup: Bahçeşehir Koleji; Frutti Extra Bursaspor
- Champions League: Darüşşafaka Tekfen; Galatasaray Doga Sigorta; Pınar Karşıyaka; Tofaş; Türk Telekom
- FIBA Europe Cup: Beşiktaş Sompo Japan

Finals
- Champions: None named due to COVID-19 pandemic

Records
- Biggest home win: Tofaş 109–59 Frutti Extra Bursaspor (12 January 2020)
- Biggest away win: Arel Üni. Büyükçekmece 56–99 Pınar Karşıyaka (26 January 2020)
- Highest scoring: Tofaş 112–93 Galatasaray Doğa Sigorta (2 November 2019)
- Winning streak: 13 games Anadolu Efes
- Losing streak: 17 games Sigortam.Net İTÜ

The 2019–20 Basketbol Süper Ligi was the 54th season of the Basketbol Süper Ligi, the top-tier level professional club basketball league in Turkey. On 19 March 2020, the league was suspended due to the coronavirus pandemic in Turkey. On 11 May 2020, it was declared that the season was cancelled by the Turkish Basketball Federation.

== Teams ==
On 5 May 2019, Bursaspor Durmazlar promoted to the BSL as the champions of the Turkish First League. It will be their first season in the Süper Ligi. OGM Ormanspor promoted to the BSL for the first time in club history as winners of the TBL play-offs.

Sakarya BB was relegated after finishing last in the 2018–19 BSL.

On 1 July 2019, Banvit B.K. changed its name as Bandırma B.İ.K.

On 16 September 2019 Istanbul BB announced that they withdrew from league due to financial issues. Instead of them, Sigortam.net İTÜ will play in the league.

=== Venues ===
Locations of the 2019–20 Basketbol Süper Ligi clubs
Istanbul Basketbol Süper Ligi clubs

Team	Home city	Stadium	Capacity
Anadolu Efes	Istanbul	Sinan Erdem Dome	16,000
Arel Üniversitesi Büyükçekmece	Istanbul	Gazanfer Bilge Spor Salonu	3,000
Bahçeşehir Koleji	Istanbul	Akatlar Arena	3,200
Beşiktaş Sompo Japan	Istanbul	Akatlar Arena	3,200
Darüşşafaka Tekfen	Istanbul	Volkswagen Arena Istanbul	5,000
Fenerbahçe Beko	Istanbul	Ülker Sports Arena	13,800
Frutti Extra Bursaspor	Bursa	Tofaş Nilüfer Sports Hall	7,500
Galatasaray Doğa Sigorta	Istanbul	Sinan Erdem Dome	16,000
Gaziantep Basketbol	Gaziantep	Karataş Şahinbey Sport Hall	6,400
Meksa Yatırım Afyon Belediyespor	Afyonkarahisar	Prof. Dr. Veysel Eroğlu Spor Salonu	2,800
OGM Ormanspor	Ankara	Ankara Arena	10,400
Pınar Karşıyaka	İzmir	Karşıyaka Arena	5,000
Sigortam.Net İTÜ	Istanbul	Darüşşafaka Ayhan Şahenk Sports Hall	3,500
Teksüt Bandırma	Bandırma	Kara Ali Acar Sport Hall	3,000
Tofaş	Bursa	Tofaş Nilüfer Sports Hall	7,500
Türk Telekom	Ankara	Ankara Arena	10,400

=== Personnel and sponsorship ===
Team	Head coach	Captain	Kit manufacturer	Main shirt sponsor
Anadolu Efes	(Turkey) Ergin Ataman	(Turkey) Doğuş Balbay	S by Sportive	Anadolu Efes
Arel Üniversitesi Büyükçekmece	(Turkey) Serhat Şehit	(Turkey) Deniz Kılıçlı	Dafron	İstanbul Arel Üniversitesi
Bahçeşehir Koleji	(Turkey) Zafer Aktaş	(Turkey) Can Altıntığ	Playoff	Bahçeşehir Koleji
Beşiktaş Sompo Japan	(Turkey) Burak Bıyıktay	(Turkey) Samet Geyik	Macron	Sompo Japan Sigorta
Darüşşafaka Tekfen	(Turkey) Selçuk Ernak	(Turkey) Erkan Veyseloğlu	Dafron	Tekfen
Fenerbahçe Beko	(Serbia) Željko Obradović	(Turkey) Melih Mahmutoğlu	Nike	Beko
Frutti Extra Bursaspor	(Turkey) Serkan Erdoğan	(Turkey) Ender Arslan	Kappa	Uludağ Frutti Extra
Galatasaray Doğa Sigorta	(Turkey) Ertuğrul Erdoğan	(Turkey) Göksenin Köksal	Givova	Doğa Sigorta
Gaziantep Basketbol	(Bosnia and Herzegovina) Nenad Marković	(Turkey) Can Uğur Öğüt	Dafron	N/A
Meksa Yatırım Afyon Belediye	(Turkey) Can Sevim	(Turkey) Ulaş Peker	Barex	Meksa Yatırım
OGM Ormanspor	(Turkey) Korhan Aydanarığ	(Turkey) Cevher Özer	Wanisax	N/A
Pınar Karşıyaka	(Turkey) Ufuk Sarıca	(Turkey) Semih Erden	S by Sportive	Pınar
Sigortam.Net İTÜ	(Turkey) Andaç Yapıcıer	(Turkey) Mehmet Yağmur	Baskethane	Sigortam.net
Teksüt Bandırma	(Turkey) Hakan Demir	(Turkey) Rıdvan Öncel & (United States) D.J. Shelton	Dafron	Teksüt
Tofaş	(Turkey) Orhun Ene	(Dominican Republic) Sammy Mejía	Dafron	Fiat
Türk Telekom	(Turkey) Burak Gören	(Turkey) Polat Kaya	Dafron	Türk Telekom

=== Head coaching changes ===
Team	Outgoing manager	Manner of departure	Date of vacancy	Position in table	Replaced with	Date of appointment
Bahçeşehir Koleji	(Greece) Stefanos Dedas	Sacked	30 October 2019	16/16	(Turkey) Zafer Aktaş	6 November 2019
Beşiktaş Sompo Japan	(Montenegro) Duško Ivanović	Mutual Agreement	27 December 2019	11/16	(Turkey) Burak Bıyıktay	27 December 2019

== Rules ==
Each team is allowed to sign with ten foreign players, only five of them are allowed to be on the match day squad. In every round, teams can include different players from their foreign player pool.

== Regular season ==
=== League table ===
Pos	Team	Pld	W	L	PF	PA	PD	Pts	Qualification (Note: There is no promotion/relegation, since the season was cancelled.)
1	Anadolu Efes	23	21	2	2045	1712	+333	44	Qualification for EuroLeague (Note: Anadolu Efes and Fenerbahçe are qualified for the EuroLeague each year as they have long-term licenses.)
2	Pınar Karşıyaka	23	20	3	1924	1587	+337	43	Qualification for Champions League
3	Galatasaray Doğa Sigorta	23	16	7	1868	1804	+64	39	Qualification for Champions League
4	Fenerbahçe Beko	22	17	5	1785	1612	+173	39	Qualification for EuroLeague (Note: Anadolu Efes and Fenerbahçe are qualified for the EuroLeague each year as they have long-term licenses.)
5	Tofaş	23	15	8	2003	1790	+213	38	Qualification for Champions League
6	Darüşşafaka Tekfen	23	13	10	1884	1763	+121	36	Qualification for Champions League
7	Teksüt Bandırma	23	12	11	1863	1808	+55	35	
8	Beşiktaş Sompo Japan	23	11	12	1825	1845	−20	34	Qualification for FIBA Europe Cup
9	Frutti Extra Bursaspor	23	11	12	1807	1905	−98	34	Qualification for EuroCup
10	Türk Telekom (Note: Türk Telekom qualified for the 2020–21 Basketball Champions League as quarterfinalists of the previous season.)	23	11	12	1783	1830	−47	34	Qualification for Champions League
11	Gaziantep Basketbol	23	9	14	1873	1930	−57	32	
12	Ormanspor	23	8	15	1811	1944	−133	31	
13	Bahçeşehir Koleji	23	7	16	1871	2002	−131	30	Qualification for EuroCup
14	Meksa Yatırım Afyon Belediye	22	7	15	1757	1783	−26	29	
15	Büyükçekmece Basketbol	23	3	20	1693	2105	−412	26	
16	Sigortam.net İTÜ BB (Note: Because of the early ending of the competition, it was decided the last team did not relegate.)	23	2	21	1720	2092	−372	25	

Source: Basketbol Süper Ligi

=== Results ===
Home \ Away	AEF	BÇB	BAH	BJK	DSK	FEN	BUR	GAL	GAZ	AFY	ORM	KSK	ITU	TEK	TOF	TTA
Anadolu Efes	—	109–69	Can.	98–104	89–83	79–66	Can.	104–80	103–79	Can.	93–82	Can.	108–62	83–72	Can.	81–71
Arel Üniversitesi Büyükçekmece	67–92	—	Can.	81–92	85–92	68–92	77–95	77–87	Can.	Can.	64–84	56–99	103–72	80–104	Can.	91–90
Bahçeşehir Koleji	67–93	96–81	—	75–80	91–87	79–100	Can.	92–71	Can.	82–87	105–111	72–70	99–94	Can.	85–92	72–87
Beşiktaş Sompo Japan	68–80	84–87	91–92	—	Can.	73–74	80–59	74–68	78–73	92–90	Can.	Can.	83–80	97–82	Can.	78–74
Darüşşafaka Tekfen	Can.	105–56	83–76	78–59	—	Can.	63–81	79–88	76–58	68–72	88–77	Can.	88–74	96–88	69–61	77–80
Fenerbahçe Beko	Can.	Can.	74–60	84–80	83–75	—	86–83	75–80	84–75	86–80	85–52	Can.	94–83	89–79	84–75	91–67
Frutti Extra Bursaspor	86–95	84–79	79–78	98–87	79–87	Can.	—	Can.	87–106	90–81	90–88	77–85	Can.	88–78	80–76	Can.
Galatasaray Doğa Sigorta	Can.	Can.	85–76	74–65	78–75	83–64	84–70	—	96–84	83–77	105–73	74–79	Can.	91–70	80–75	93–71
Gaziantep Basketbol	83–88	88–73	90–92	Can.	77–86	81–70	Can.	Can.	—	78–71	102–77	67–83	96–94	73–63	69–81	Can.
Meksa Yatırım Afyon Belediye	84–88	81–69	95–91	73–68	81–83	62–64	86–55	67–68	92–95	—	Can.	66–75	96–73		73–84	78–82
OGM Ormanspor	68–79	84–75	108–93	72–80	Can.	Can.	81–82	Can.	59–83	77–76	—	70–86	73–70	81–86	76–94	64–82
Pınar Karşıyaka	80–82	80–59	85–54	82–68	84–78	68–57	76–71	84–55	82–72	Can.	Can.	—	105–67	91–82	Can.	85–66
Sigortam.Net İTÜ	49–63	86–63	Can.	Can.	61–98	57–90	71–90	83–86	Can.	Can.	94–93	81–91	—	76–94	80–91	85–101
Teksüt Bandırma	84–66	99–65	82–68	85–64	Can.	Can.	72–62	Can.	99–72	80–83	66–85	57–89	64–48	—	86–80	
Tofaş	72–83	110–68	77–76	86–80	Can.	76–82	109–59	112–93	108–88	79–71	Can.	94–88	123–80	Can.	—	81–72
Türk Telekom	81–103	Can.	Can.	Can.	85–70	59–75	80–62	78–66	88–84	92–83	66–76	62–77	Can.	81–91	68–67	—

Source: bsl.org
Legend: Blue = home team win; Red = away team win.
Matches with lighter background shading were decided after overtime.

=== Awards ===
All official awards of the 2019–20 Basketbol Süper Ligi .

==== MVP of the Round ====
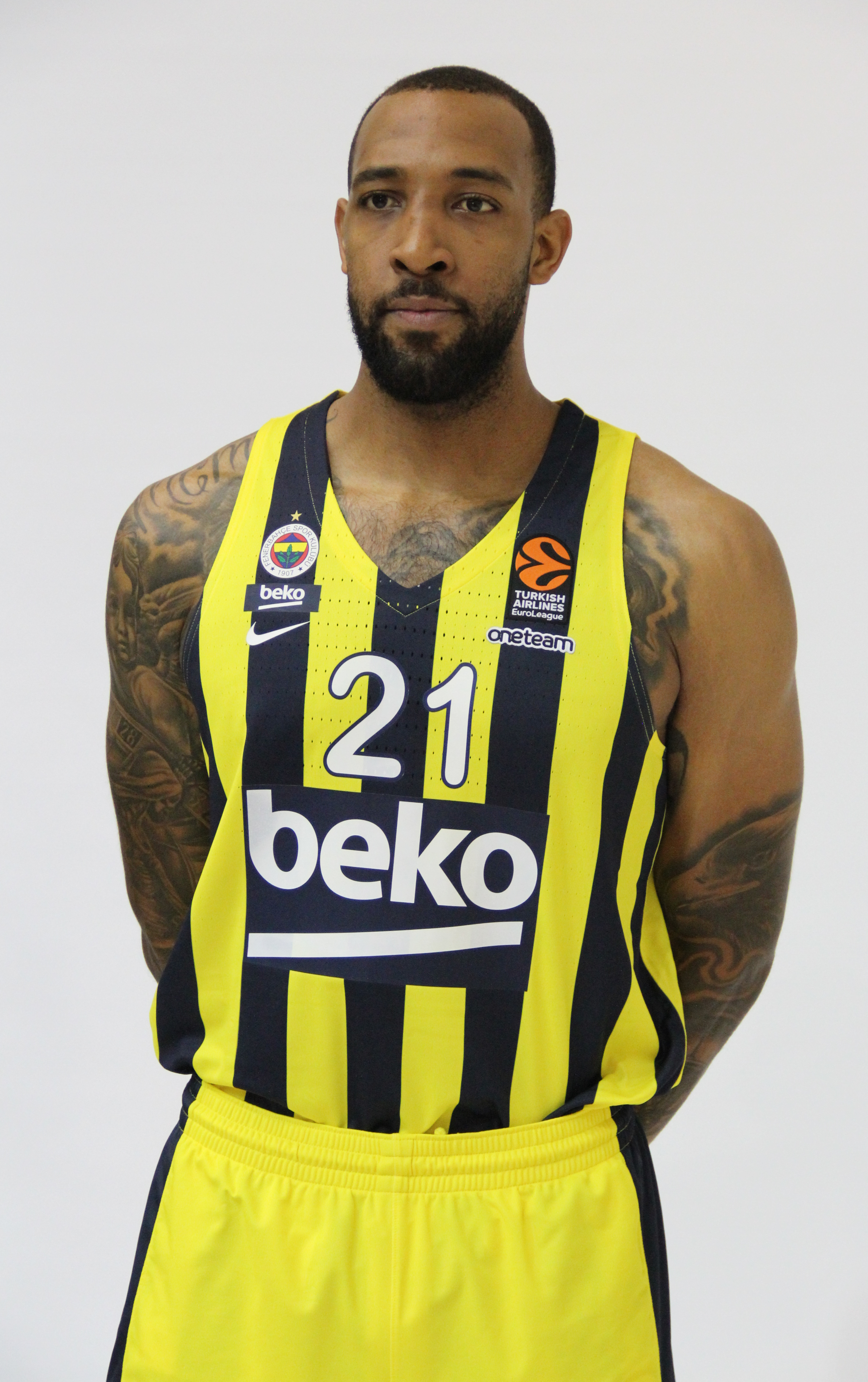
Derrick Williams

Gameday	Player	Team	EFF	Ref.
1	(United States) Doron Lamb	Darüşşafaka Tekfen	32	
2	(United States) Devin Williams	Tofaş	33	
3	(Turkey) Berkan Durmaz	Tofaş	32	
4	(Trinidad and Tobago) Johnny Hamilton	Darüşşafaka Tekfen	32	
5	(United States) Jordon Crawford	Afyon Belediye	30	
6	(Turkey) Sertaç Şanlı	Anadolu Efes	38	
7	(Croatia) Luka Babić	OGM Ormanspor	31	
8	(United States) Chris Warren	OGM Ormanspor	36	
9	(United States) Perry Jones	Frutti Extra Bursaspor	31	
10	(United States) Andrew Andrews	Arel Üniversitesi Büyükçekmece	29	
11	(United States) JaJuan Johnson	Bahçeşehir Koleji	34	
12	(United States) Chris Jones	Frutti Extra Bursaspor	31	
13	(United States) Trae Golden	Bahçeşehir Koleji	39	
14	(United States) Trae Golden (2)	Bahçeşehir Koleji	32	
15	(France) Moustapha Fall	Türk Telekom	45	
16	(Australia) Mangok Mathiang	Bahçeşehir Koleji	33	
17	(Azerbaijan) Shaq McKissic	Beşiktaş Sompo Japan	41	
18	(United States) Derrick Williams	Fenerbahçe Beko	29	
18	(United States) Peyton Aldridge	Meksa Yatırım Afyon Belediye	29	
19	(Turkey) Kartal Özmızrak	Darüşşafaka Tekfen	29	
20	(United States) Jordon Crawford	Afyon Belediye	41	
21	(Australia) Mangok Mathiang	Bahçeşehir Koleji	32	
22	(United Kingdom) Gabriel Olaseni	Frutti Extra Bursaspor	31	
23	Not awarded^{1}			
24	Not awarded^{1}			
25	Not awarded^{1}			
26	Not awarded^{1}			
27	Not awarded^{1}			
28	Not awarded^{1}			
29	Not awarded^{1}			
30	Not awarded^{1}			

Notes:

^1 There was no awarding for the remaining of the weeks in the 2019–20, because the season was cancelled due to the coronavirus pandemic in Europe.

== Awards ==
All official awards of the 2019–20 Basketbol Süper Ligi.

=== Season awards ===
Award	Player	Team
Regular Season MVP	(United States) Trae Golden	Bahcesehir
Defensive Player of the Year	(France) Moustapha Fall	Türk Telekom
Best Coach	(Turkey) Ufuk Sarıca	Pinar Karsiyaka
All-Turkish League Team	(United States) Trae Golden	Bahcesehir
All-Turkish League Team	(Serbia) Vasilije Micić	Anadolu Efes
All-Turkish League Team	(France) Nando de Colo	Fenerbahçe
All-Turkish League Team	(United States) Jordan Morgan	Pinar Karsiyaka
All-Turkish League Team	(United States) Devin Williams	Tofaş

== Turkish clubs in European competitions ==
Team	Competition	Progress
Anadolu Efes	EuroLeague	Regular season^{1}
Fenerbahçe Beko	EuroLeague	Regular season^{1}
Darüşşafaka Tekfen	EuroCup	Top 16
Galatasaray Doğa Sigorta	EuroCup	Top 16
Tofaş	EuroCup	Quarterfinals^{1}
Beşiktaş Sompo Japan	Champions League	Round of 16
Gaziantep Basketbol	Champions League	Regular season
Teksüt Bandırma	Champions League	Round of 16
Türk Telekom	Champions League	Quarterfinals
Bahçeşehir Koleji	FIBA Europe Cup	Semifinals^{1}
Pınar Karşıyaka	FIBA Europe Cup	Semifinals^{1}

^1 Cancelled due to the COVID-19 pandemic in Europe.
