= Tuğberk Gedikli =

Turkish basketball player (born 1991)

No. 2 – HDI Sigorta Afyon Belediye
- Position: Point guard
- League: BSL

Personal information
- Born: October 13, 1991 (age 35) Bursa, Turkey
- Listed height: 6 ft 4 in (1.93 m)
- Listed weight: 210 lb (95 kg)

Career information
- Playing career: 2008–present

Career history
- 2008–2014: Darüşşafaka Cooper Tires
- 2014: Uşak Sportif
- 2014–2015: Best Balıkesir
- 2015–2016: Tofaş
- 2016–2017: Afyon Belediye
- 2017–2018: Bursaspor
- 2018–2019: Karesi Spor
- 2019–2020: Bursaspor
- 2020–2021: Balıkesir BŞB
- 2021–2022: Fethiye Belediyespor
- 2022–present: Afyon Belediye

Tuğberk Gedikli (born October 13, 1991) is a Turkish professional basketball player for Afyon Belediye of the Basketbol Süper Ligi, who plays as a point guard.
