= DeAndre Pinckney =

American basketball player (born 2000)

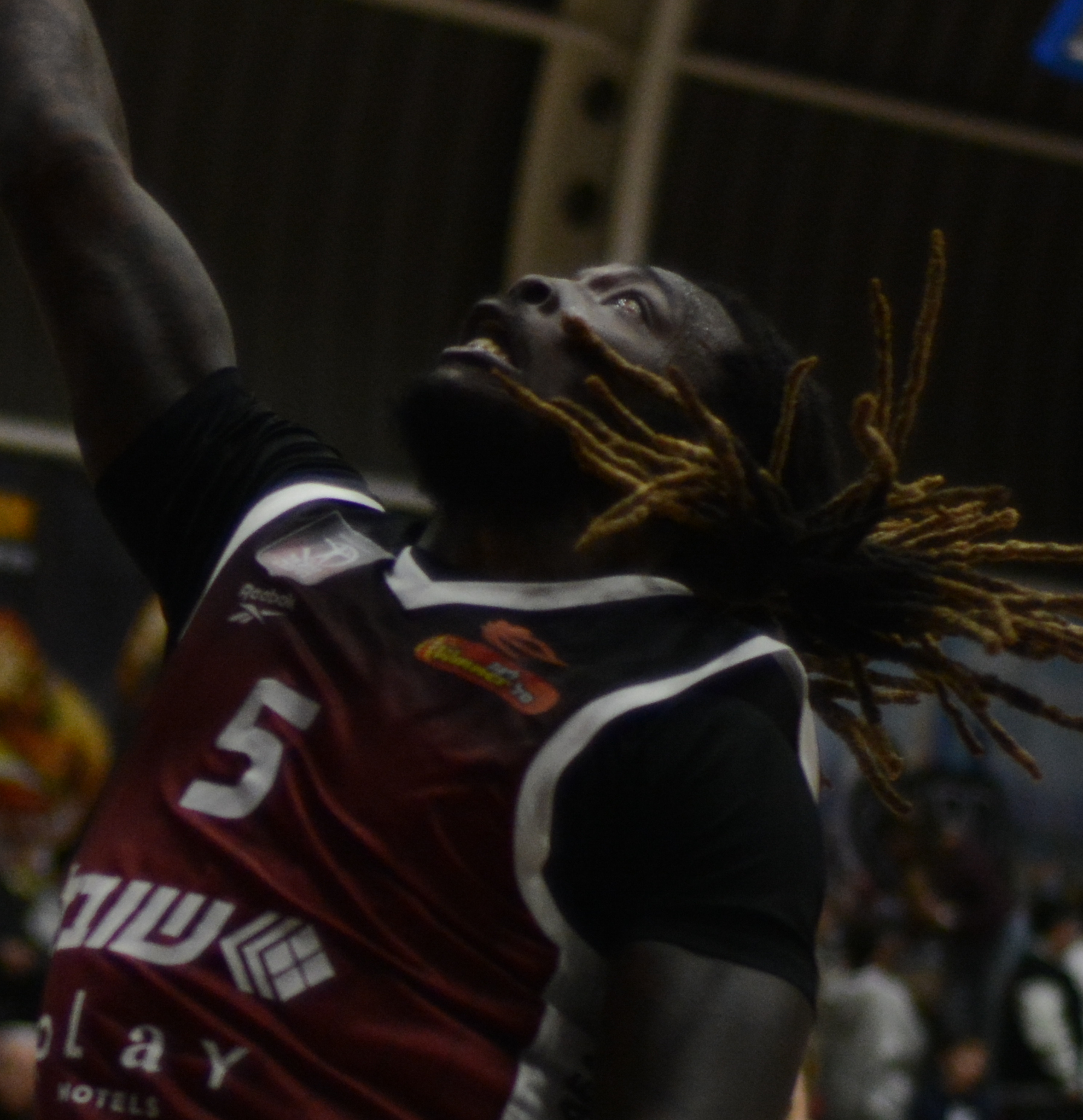
- Pinckney with Hapoel Haifa

Göztepe
- Position: Power forward
- League: TBL

Personal information
- Born: February 29, 2000 (age 26) Miami Gardens, Florida, U.S.
- Listed height: 6 ft 8 in (2.03 m)
- Listed weight: 223 lb (101 kg)

Career information
- High school: Miami Carol City (Miami Gardens, Florida)
- College: Broward (2018–2020); Southern Miss (2020–2023)
- NBA draft: 2023: undrafted
- Playing career: 2023–present

Career history
- 2023–2024: Bakken Bears
- 2024: ESSM Le Portel
- 2024–2025: Hapoel Haifa
- 2025–2026: CS Vâlcea 1924
- 2026: Maccabi Ironi Ramat Gan
- 2026: Capitanes de Arecibo
- 2026: AEK Athens
- 2026–present: Göztepe

Career highlights
- ENBL champion (2024); ENBL Final MVP (2024); Danish League champion (2024); Third-team All-Sun Belt (2023)

DeAndre Pinckney (born February 29, 2000) is an American professional basketball player for Göztepe of the Türkiye Basketbol Ligi (TBL). He is a 2.03 m (6 ft 8 in) tall power forward.

== Early life ==
Pinckney was born in Miami Gardens, Florida. He attended Miami Carol City Senior High School in Florida, where he played high school basketball before continuing his career at the collegiate level.

== College career ==
=== Broward College (2018–2020) ===
Pinckney began his collegiate career at Broward College in Fort Lauderdale, Florida. During his time at the junior-college level, he established himself as one of the team's leading players.

=== Southern Miss (2020–2023) ===
In 2020, Pinckney transferred to the Southern Miss Golden Eagles. Over three seasons, he appeared in 87 games and averaged 10.3 points and 5.7 rebounds per game.

During his senior season in 2022–23, Pinckney averaged 12.9 points and 6.6 rebounds per game and earned Third Team All-Sun Belt Conference honors as well as NABC All-District Second Team recognition.

== Professional career ==
=== Bakken Bears (2023–2024) ===
After going undrafted in the 2023 NBA draft, Pinckney signed his first professional contract with the Bakken Bears of Denmark. With the Bears, he won the ENBL and was named the Finals MVP.

=== ESSM Le Portel (2024) ===
Pinckney subsequently joined ESSM Le Portel of the French LNB Pro A. He left the team on October 24, 2024.

=== Hapoel Haifa (2024–2025) ===
He played for Hapoel Haifa B.C. in Israel.

=== CS Vâlcea 1924 (2025) ===
Pinckney continued his professional career with CS Vâlcea 1924 in Romania.

=== Maccabi Ironi Ramat Gan (2025–2026) ===
During the 2025–26 season, Pinckney played for Maccabi Ironi Ramat Gan in Israel.

=== Capitanes de Arecibo (2026) ===
Pinckney also played for the Capitanes de Arecibo in Puerto Rico during 2026.

=== AEK Athens (2026) ===
On 26 August 2026, AEK Athens announced the signing of Pinckney. The club described him as a 2.03-metre forward with professional experience in Denmark, France, Israel, Romania and Puerto Rico.

=== Göztepe (2026–present) ===
On November 1, 2026, he signed with Göztepe of the Türkiye Basketbol Ligi (TBL).
