= Ender Arslan =

Turkish basketball player (born 1983)

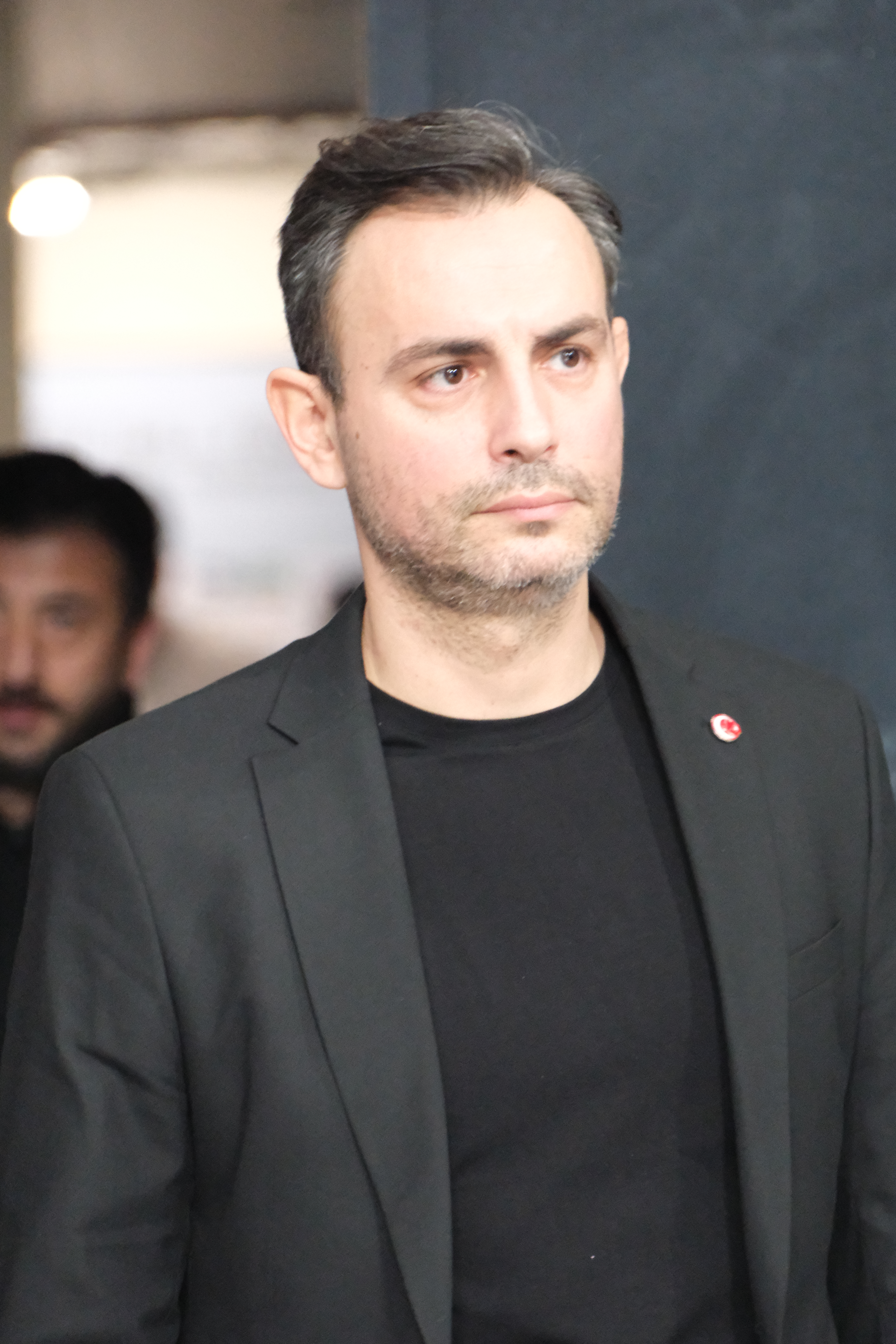
- Arslan in 2025.

Çayırova Belediyespor
- Title: Head coach

Personal information
- Born: 13 January 1983 (age 43) Istanbul, Turkey
- Listed height: 6 ft 2.75 in (1.90 m)
- Listed weight: 180 lb (82 kg)

Career information
- NBA draft: 2005: undrafted
- Playing career: 2000–2021
- Position: Point guard
- Number: 13, 33, 4, 10

Career history

Playing
- 2000–2006: Efes Pilsen
- 2006–2007: Union Olimpija
- 2007: TAU Cerámica
- 2007: Panionios
- 2007–2011: Efes Pilsen
- 2011–2015: Galatasaray Liv Hospital
- 2015–2017: Darüşşafaka
- 2017–2019: Türk Telekom
- 2019–2021: Bursaspor

Coaching
- 2021–2023: Bahçeşehir Koleji (assistant)
- 2023: Çağdaş Bodrumspor
- 2025: Esenler Erokspor
- 2026–present: Çayırova Belediyespor

Career highlights
- As player: 6× Turkish League champion (2002–2005, 2009, 2013); 5× Turkish Cup winner (2001, 2002, 2006, 2008, 2009); 3× Turkish President's Cup winner (2002, 2009, 2012); As assistant coach: FIBA Europe Cup champion (2022); As head coach: 2× Türkiye Basketbol Ligi champion (2023, 2026); Federation Cup champion (2026)

Ender Arslan (born 13 January 1983) is a Turkish professional basketball coach and former player who played at the point guard position. He is the current head coach for Çayırova Belediyespor of the Türkiye Basketbol Ligi (TBL).

== Professional career ==
Arslan has played with TAU Cerámica in the Spanish ACB League, Panionios in the Greek Basketball League, Union Olimpija in the Slovenian Basketball League and with Efes Pilsen in the Turkish Basketball Super League.

On 21 June 2011, he signed a contract with Galatasaray Liv Hospital. In June 2015, he parted ways with Galatasaray. On 7 July 2015, he signed with Darüşşafaka. In July 2017, he signed with Türk Telekom.

On August 7, 2019, he has signed with Bursaspor of the Turkish Basketball Super League (BSL). Arslan signed a contract extension with the team on July 11, 2020.

On April 24, 2021, Arslan retired from professional basketball after playing his last game with Bursaspor.

== National team career ==
Arslan was a regular member of the senior Turkish national basketball team.

== Coaching career ==
Following retirement, he has started his coaching career by becoming assistant coach for Bahçeşehir Koleji of the Turkish Basketbol Süper Ligi (BSL).

On February 5, 2023, he signed and became head coach for Çağdaş Bodrumspor of the Turkish Basketball First League (TBL).

2024 Became the Turkish U20 National Team coach in the FIBA EuroBasket U20 which took place in Gdnyia.

On March 13, 2025, he signed with Esenler Erokspor of the Türkiye Basketbol Ligi (TBL).
