= Ergi Tırpancı =

Turkish basketball player

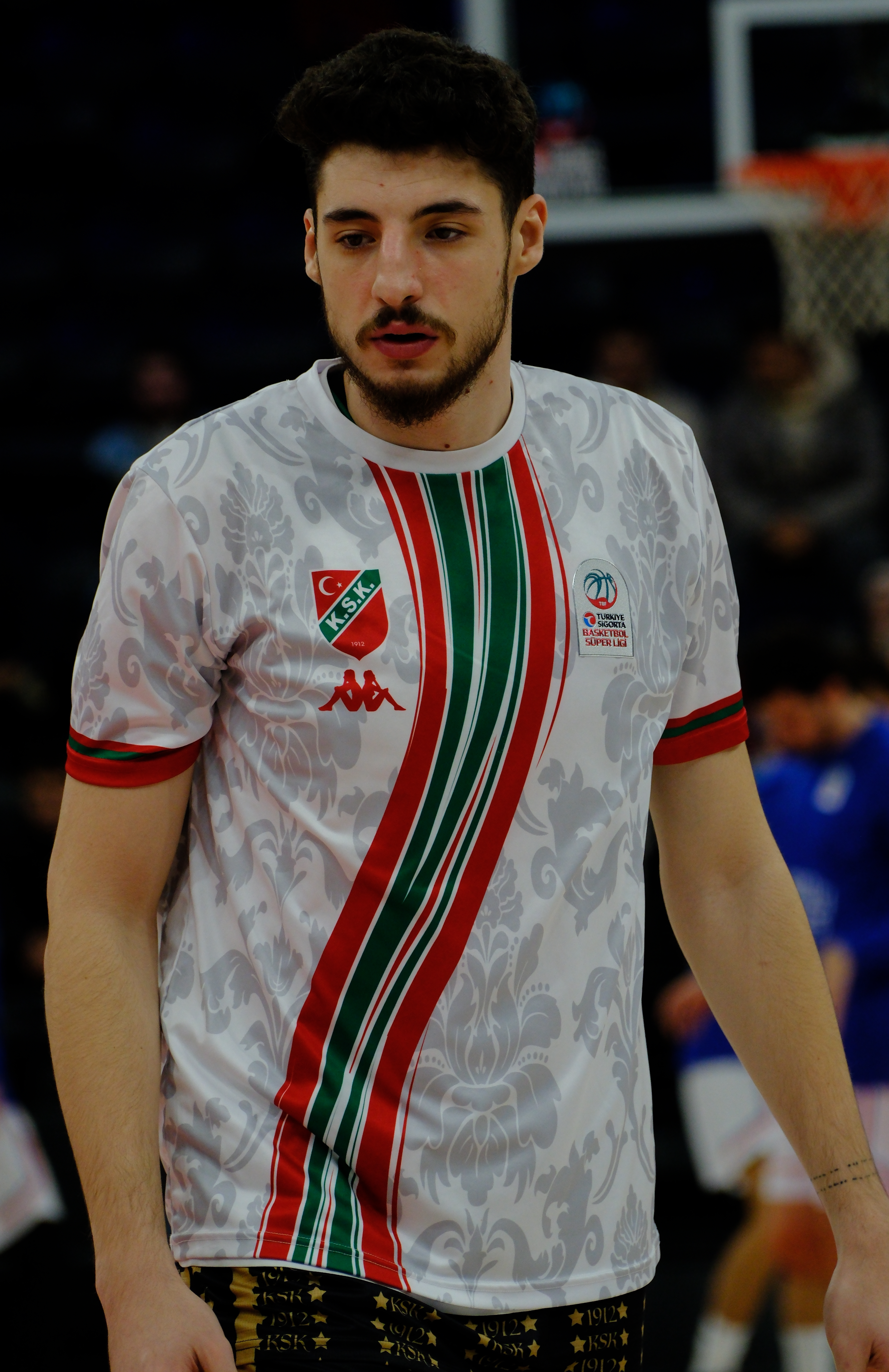

No. 10 – Bursaspor Basketbol
- Position: Small forward
- League: Basketbol Süper Ligi

Personal information
- Born: January 1, 2000 (age 26) Ankara, Turkey
- Listed height: 6 ft 7 in (2.01 m)
- Listed weight: 205 lb (93 kg)

Career information
- Playing career: 2017–present

Career history
- 2017–2020: Fenerbahçe
- 2020–2021: OGM Ormanspor
- 2021–2022: Afyon Belediye
- 2022: Yalovaspor
- 2022–2025: Karşıyaka Basket
- 2025–2026: Mersin MSK
- 2026–present: Bursaspor Basketbol

Career highlights
- Turkish League champion (2018); 2× Turkish Cup winner (2019, 2020); Turkish President's Cup winner (2017)

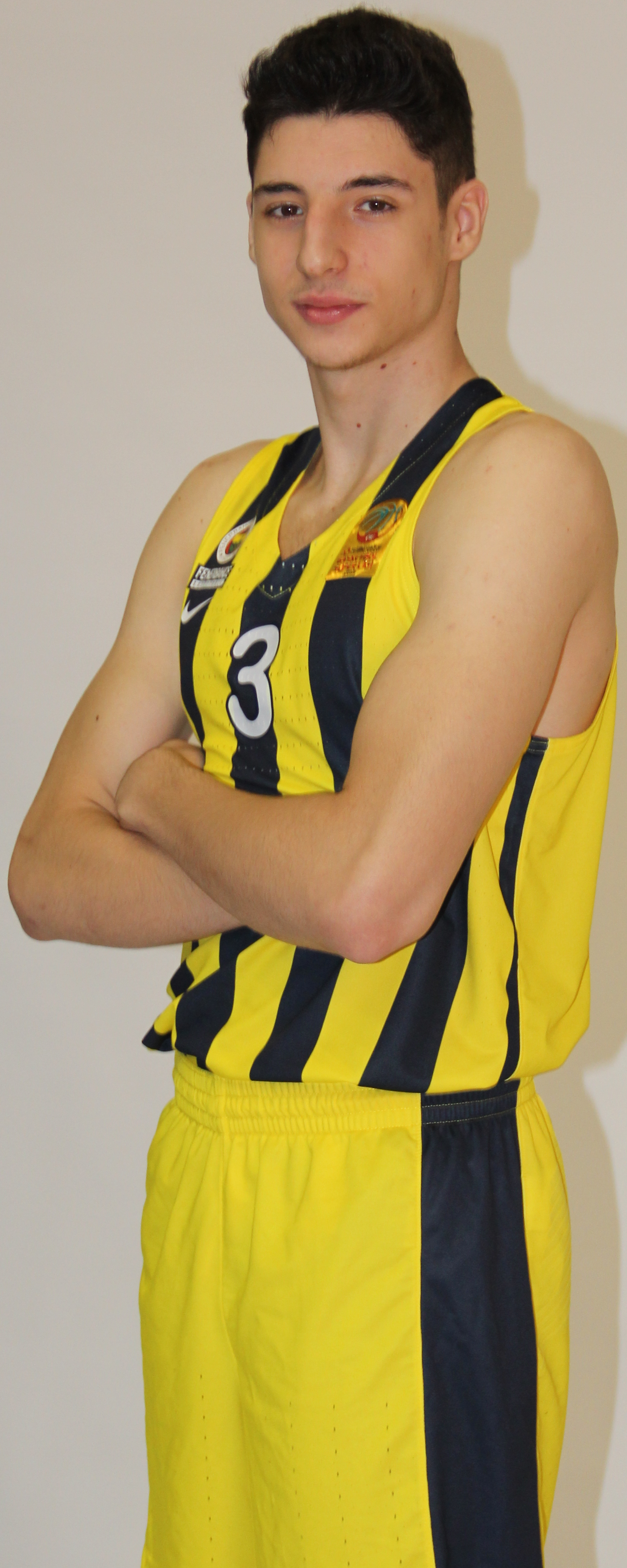

Efe Ergi Tırpancı (born January 1, 2000) is a Turkish professional basketball player for Bursaspor Basketbol of the Basketbol Süper Ligi (BSL). Standing at 2.01 m (6 ft 7 in), he plays at the small forward position.
