= Erdi Gülaslan =

Turkish basketball player (born 1994)

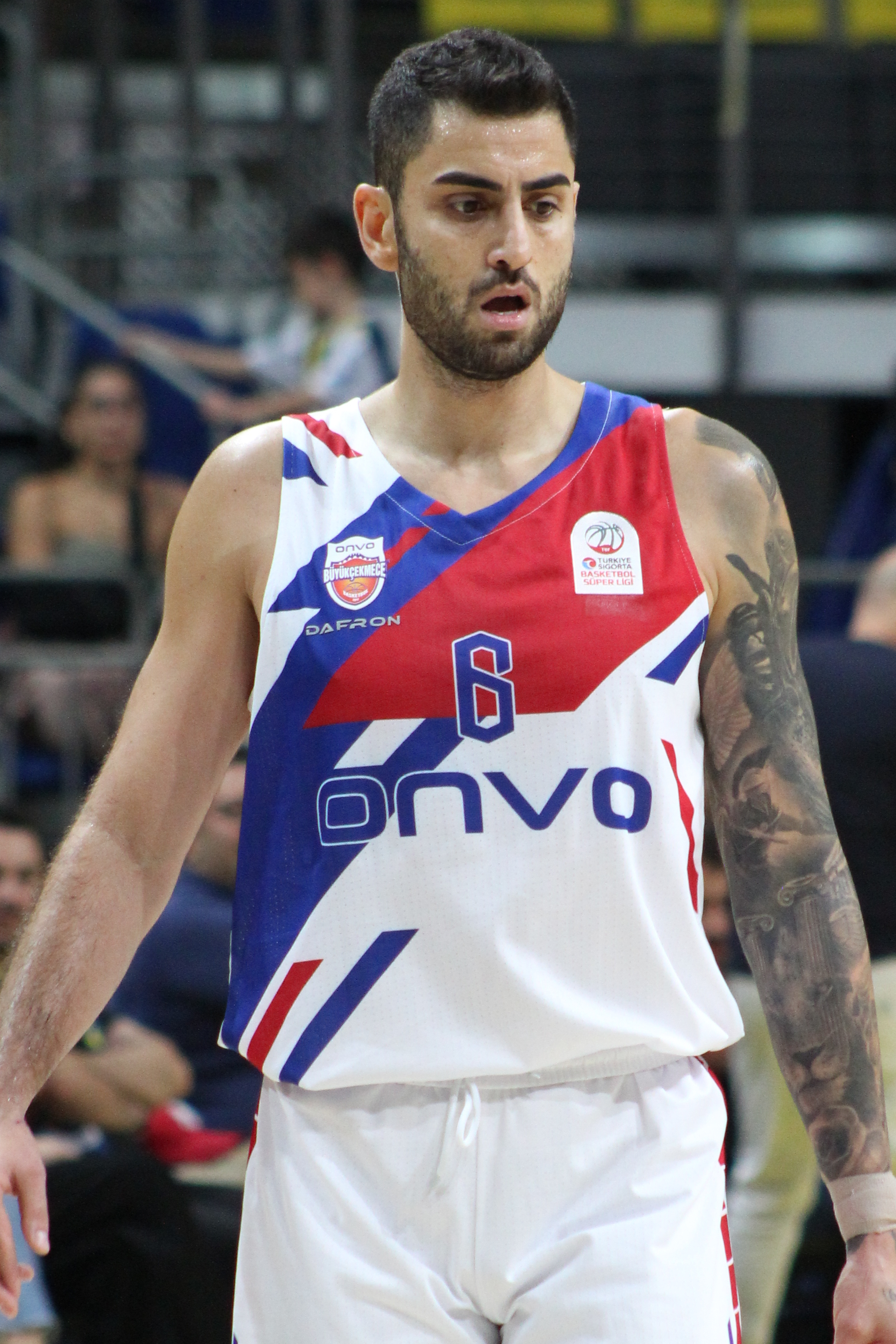

No. 6 – Çayırova Belediyespor
- Position: Small forward
- League: Basketbol Süper Ligi

Personal information
- Born: 3 March 1994 (age 32) İzmit, Turkey
- Listed height: 6 ft 8 in (2.03 m)
- Listed weight: 205 lb (93 kg)

Career information
- Playing career: 2010–present

Career history
- 2010–2011: Bornova Belediyespor
- 2011–2012: Göztepe
- 2012–2013: Başkent Gençlik Ankara
- 2013–2014: Aliağa Petkim
- 2014–2015: Gelişim Koleji
- 2015–2016: Trabzonspor
- 2016–2019: Pınar Karşıyaka
- 2019–2020: Afyon Belediye
- 2020–2022: Türk Telekom
- 2022–2023: Manisa BB
- 2023–2025: Büyükçekmece Basketbol
- 2025–present: Çayırova Belediye

Career highlights
- Federation Cup champion (2026)

Gani Erdi Gülaslan (born 3 March 1994) is a Turkish professional basketball player who plays as a small forward for Çayırova Belediyespor of the Basketbol Süper Ligi (BSL).

== Professional career ==
On 11 July 2015 he signed with Trabzonspor of the Turkish Basketbol Süper Ligi (BSL).

On 30 July 2016 he signed with Pınar Karşıyaka of the BSL.

On 6 July 2020 he signed with Türk Telekom of the BSL.

On 26 August 2022 he signed with Manisa BB of the Turkish Basketbol Süper Ligi.

On July 3, 2023, he signed with ONVO Büyükçekmece of the Basketbol Süper Ligi (BSL).
