= Emlak Konut SK =

Turkish women's basketball team

Emlak Konut Spor Kulübü
- Leagues: Turkish Super League; EuroCup Women
- Founded: 2017; 9 years ago
- Arena: Başakşehir Spor Kompleksi
- Location: Istanbul, Turkey
- Team colors: Blue-White
- President: Yasir Yılmaz
- Head coach: Murat Alkaş
| Home | Away |

Emlak Konut Spor Kulübü is a Turkish women's basketball club based in Istanbul, Turkey. The club was founded in 2017 and currently competing in the Women's Basketball Super League.

The team promoted to the Women's Basketball Super League after winning the TKBL title in the 2021–22 season.

== Current roster ==
Emlak Konut Spor Kulübü roster
Players
Coaches

| Pos. | No. | Nat. | Name | Ht. | Age |
|---|---|---|---|---|---|
| F | 0 | (Turkey) | Ulufer, Nehir | 1.81 m (5 ft 11 in) | 21 – 8 April 2005 |
| G | 1 | (Turkey) | Ülker, Asya | 1.69 m (5 ft 7 in) | 20 – 14 November 2005 |
| F/C | 2 | (Turkey) | Yılmaz, Miray | | 22 – 20 July 2004 |
| C | 3 | (Nigeria) | Kunaiyi-Akpannah, Pallas | 1.88 m (6 ft 2 in) | 29 – 12 July 1997 |
| PG | 5 | (Turkey) | Akpınar, Ceren | 1.75 m (5 ft 9 in) | 21 – 23 June 2005 |
| SG | 7 | (Turkey) | Sertoğlu, Berfin | 1.75 m (5 ft 9 in) | 22 – 19 August 2004 |
| F | 8 | (Turkey) | Yılmaz, Yağmur | 1.80 m (5 ft 11 in) | 21 – 11 May 2005 |
| C | 9 | (Turkey) | Çelik, Zeynep | 1.93 m (6 ft 4 in) | 21 – 10 January 2005 |
| SF | 10 | (Turkey) | Uzunoğlu, Melek | 1.88 m (6 ft 2 in) | 24 – 6 February 2002 |
| G | 13 | (Hungary) | Lelik, Réka | 1.78 m (5 ft 10 in) | 27 – 14 April 1999 |
| SF | 14 | (Turkey) | Balkan, Eda | 1.73 m (5 ft 8 in) | 22 – 3 January 2004 |
| G | 15 | (United States) | Allen, Lindsay | 1.73 m (5 ft 8 in) | 31 – 20 March 1995 |
| PF | 17 | (Turkey) | Laiç, Feray | 1.85 m (6 ft 1 in) | 21 – 30 January 2005 |
| SF | 21 | (Turkey) | Çalışkan, Nimet | 1.83 m (6 ft 0 in) | 22 – 21 May 2004 |
| F/C | 23 | (Poland) (Zimbabwe) | Mavunga, Stephanie | 1.90 m (6 ft 3 in) | 31 – 24 February 1995 |
| F | 41 | (Italy) | Penna, Elisa | 1.91 m (6 ft 3 in) | 30 – 13 November 1995 |

Head coach

- (Turkey) Murat Alkaş

Assistant coach(es)

- (Turkey) Emre Beşer

Legend

- (C) Team captain
- Injured

- Roster
Updated: 30 September 2026

== Honours ==
=== Domestic competitions ===
- Turkish Women's Basketball League
  - Winners (1): 2021–22
- Turkish Women's Basketball Federation Cup
  - Winners (1): 2020–21
  - Runners-up (1): 2021–22
