= Warren Washington =

Warren Washington may refer to:

- Warren M. Washington, American atmospheric scientist
- Warren Washington (basketball), American basketball player
