= Mike Moore (basketball) =

American basketball player (born 1994)

Michael Moore
No. 1 – Bursaspor Basketbol
- Position: Power forward
- League: Basketbol Süper Ligi

Personal information
- Born: May 30, 1994 (age 32) Magnolia, North Carolina, U.S.
- Listed height: 2.03 m (6 ft 8 in)
- Listed weight: 95 kg (209 lb)

Career information
- High school: James Kenan (Warsaw, North Carolina)
- College: Mount Olive (2012–2016)
- NBA draft: 2016: undrafted
- Playing career: 2016–present

Career history
- 2016–2017: Cestistica Civitavecchia
- 2017–2018: Svendborg Rabbits
- 2018: Cañeros del Este
- 2018–2019: Borås Basket
- 2019: Virtus Roma
- 2019–2020: Latina
- 2020–2021: Iraklis Thessaloniki
- 2021: Peñas Huesca
- 2021–2022: Rosa Radom
- 2022–2023: Körmend
- 2023: Granada
- 2023–2024: Sporting CP
- 2024–2025: Antwerp Giants
- 2025: Karşıyaka
- 2025–2026: Lokomotiv Kuban
- 2026–present: Bursaspor Basketbol

Career highlights
- Third-team All-Conference Carolinas (2016)

Michael Jarade Moore (born May 30, 1994) is an American professional basketball player for Bursaspor Basketbol of the Basketbol Süper Ligi (BSL). Moore plays at the power forward position.

== High school career ==
Moore played high school basketball at James Kenan High School, in Warsaw, North Carolina.

== College career ==
Moore chose to play college basketball at Mount Olive College after finishing high school at Keenan High School. During his senior year with the Trojans, he averaged 12.3 points, 5.8 rebounds and 1.5 assists per game, and he was included to the Conference Carolinas All Third-team.

== Professional career ==
After going undrafted in the 2014 NBA draft, Moore was acquired from the Cestistica Civitavecchia of the Serie C Gold. The following year, he joined Svendborg Rabbits of the Basketligaen, where he averaged 15.8 points per game. On June 8, 2018, after a short stint with Cañeros del Este, he joined Borås Basket of the Basketligaen.

The following season, Moore joined the Brooklyn Nets for the Las Vegas Summer League. He then split the 2019–20 season between Virtus Roma and Latina. With Latina, he averaged 11.8 points and 4.8 rebounds per game.

On July 18, 2020, Moore joined Iraklis of the Greek Basket League.

On May 31, 2021, he has signed with HydroTruck Radom of the Polish Basketball League.

On January 8, 2023, Mike Moore joined Covirán Granada of the Spanish Liga Endesa.

On July 16, 2024, he signed with Antwerp Giants of the BNXT League.

On August 13, 2025, he signed with Karşıyaka Basket of the Basketbol Süper Ligi (BSL).

On August 16, 2026, he signed with Bursaspor Basketbol of the Basketbol Süper Ligi (BSL).
