= Turkish Women's Basketball Federation Cup =

Basketball tournament

Turkish Women's Basketball Federation Cup Kadınlar Federasyon Kupası
- Founded: 2015; 11 years ago
- No. of teams: 8
- Country: Turkey
- Confederation: FIBA Europe
- Related competitions: Turkish Women's Basketball League
- Website: tbf.org.tr

The Turkish Women's Basketball Federation Cup (Turkish: Basketbol Kadınlar Federasyon Kupası), is the Turkey women's professional second-tier basketball league cup tournament. It has been held and organised by the Turkish Basketball Federation since 2015. It is contested annually by clubs from the Turkish Women's Basketball League.

== Finals ==
Season	Venue	Winners	Score	Runners-up	Ref.
2015–16	Afyonkarahisar	Osmaniye Gençlik	57–49	Mersin Basketbol	
2016–17	Bursa	OGM Ormanspor	69–43	Çankaya Üniversitesi	
2017–18	Isparta	İzmit Belediyespor	69–62	Bodrum Basketbol	
2018	Balıkesir	Elazığ İl Özel İdarespor	78–62	A Koleji	
2019	Muğla	Fenerbahçe Gelişim	89–62	1881 Düzce Belediye	
2020	Kocaeli	Emlak Konut	67–61	Bursa BB	
2021	Ankara	Mersin BB	69–66	Emlak Konut	
2022	Eskişehir	Tarsus Belediyesispor	54–51	Elazığ İl Özel İdarespor	
2025	Istanbul	Edremit Belediyesi Gürespor	80–54	Turgutlu Belediyespor	
2026	Istanbul	Samsun Basketbol	87–75	Kırklareli Belediyesi Fen Bilimleri	

== Performance by club ==
Club	Winners	Runners-up
Elazığ İl Özel İdarespor	1	1
Emlak Konut	1	1
Osmaniye Gençlik	1	0
OGM Ormanspor	1	0
İzmit Belediyespor	1	0
Fenerbahçe Gelişim	1	0
Mersin BB	1	0
Tarsus Belediyesispor	1	0
Edremit Belediyesi Gürespor	1	0
Samsun Basketbol	1	0
Mersin Basketbol	0	1
Çankaya Üniversitesi	0	1
Bodrum Basketbol	0	1
A Koleji	0	1
1881 Düzce Belediye	0	1
Bursa BB	0	1
Turgutlu Belediyespor	0	1
Kırklareli Belediyesi Fen Bilimleri	0	1

== See also ==
- Men's
- Turkish Men's Basketball League
- Turkish Men's Basketball Cup
- Turkish Men's Basketball Presidential Cup
- Turkish Men's Basketball Federation Cup
- Women's
- Turkish Women's Basketball League
- Turkish Women's Basketball Cup
- Turkish Women's Basketball Presidential Cup
- Turkish Women's Basketball Federation Cup
