= Bursaspor Basketbol =

Bursaspor
- Nickname: Timsahlar (Crocodiles)
- Leagues: Basketbol Süper Ligi
- Founded: 2014; 12 years ago
- Arena: Tofaş Spor Salonu
- Capacity: 7,500
- Location: Bursa, Turkey
- President: Sezer Sezgin
- Head coach: Roger Grimau
- Team captain: Brandon Taylor
- 2024–25 position: Basketbol Süper Ligi, 9th of 16
- Championships: 1 Turkish First League
- Website: Link
Home	Away

Bursaspor Basketbol is a Turkish professional basketball club based in Bursa. Founded in 2014, the club is the basketball section of the multi-sport club Bursaspor and currently competes in the Basketbol Süper Ligi, the top-tier basketball league in Turkey.

== History ==
Bursaspor Basketbol was founded in 2014 and entered the Third Turkish League. In 2019, Bursaspor promoted to the Basketbol Süper Ligi (BSL), for the first time after winning the Turkish Second Division championship. In the 2019–20 Basketbol Süper Ligi, Bursaspor played until the season was cancelled due to the COVID-19 pandemic. After finishing ninth in the standings, the team played in the 2020–21 EuroCup Basketball. This was the European debut of the team.

== Sponsorship names ==
- Bursaspor Durmazlar: 2016–2019
- Frutti Extra Bursaspor: 2019–2023
- Bursaspor İnfo Yatırım: 2023–2024
- Bursaspor Yörsan: 2024–2025

== Players ==
=== Current roster ===
Note: Flags indicate national team eligibility at FIBA-sanctioned events. Players may hold other non-FIBA nationalities not displayed.

Bursaspor roster
Players
Coaches

Pos.	No.	Nat.	Name	Ht.	Age
PF	1	(United States)	Moore, Mike	2.03 m (6 ft 8 in)	32 – 30 May 1994
F	2	(United States)	Hammonds, Leyton	2.03 m (6 ft 8 in)	32 – 30 September 1994
G	4	(United States)	Freeman-Liberty, Javon	1.91 m (6 ft 3 in)	27 – 20 October 1999
G	5	(Turkey)	Paçacı, Mete	1.91 m (6 ft 3 in)	19 – 4 May 2007
SF	10	(Turkey)	Tırpancı, Ergi	2.01 m (6 ft 7 in)	26 – 1 January 2000
PG	11	(United States)	Taylor, Brandon (C)	1.78 m (5 ft 10 in)	32 – 8 January 1994
PG	12	(United States)	Cummings, Will	1.88 m (6 ft 2 in)	34 – 7 October 1992
C	19	(Lithuania)	Sajus, Martynas	2.08 m (6 ft 10 in)	30 – 22 February 1996
F	13	(Turkey)	Çal, Buğra	2.06 m (6 ft 9 in)	22 – 5 May 2004
G	17	(Turkey)	Baykurt, Berkan Yağız	1.90 m (6 ft 3 in)	20 – 6 January 2006
PG	21	(Turkey)	İlyasoğlu, Ömercan	1.96 m (6 ft 5 in)	25 – 1 January 2001
C	22	(United States)	Washington, Warren	2.13 m (7 ft 0 in)	26 – 3 March 2000
SG	31	(United States)	Brown, Bryce	1.91 m (6 ft 3 in)	29 – 24 July 1997

Head coach

- (Spain) Roger Grimau

Assistant coach(es)

- (Turkey) Göktuğ Dilbazer
- (Turkey) Cihan Gündüz
- (Turkey) Tolga İz

Team manager

- (Turkey) Emre Ekim

Legend

- (C) Team captain
- Injured

- Roster
Updated: November 21, 2026

=== Depth chart ===
Pos.	Starting 5	Bench 1	Bench 2
C	Warren Washington	Martynas Sajus
PF	Mike Moore	Buğra Çal
SF	Leyton Hammonds	Ergi Tırpancı
SG	Javon Freeman-Liberty	Bryce Brown	Mete Paçacı
PG	Brandon Taylor	Ömercan İlyasoğlu	Yağız Baykurt

=== Notable past players ===
Note: Flags indicate national team eligibility at FIBA-sanctioned events. Players may hold other non-FIBA nationalities not displayed.

Criteria

To appear in this section a player must have either:

- Set a club record or won an individual award while at the club
- Played at least one official international match for their national team at any time
- Played at least one official NBA match at any time.

- (Turkey) Ender Arslan
- (Turkey) Birkan Batuk
- (Turkey) Onuralp Bitim
- (Turkey) Oğuz Savaş
- (Turkey) Yiğitcan Saybir
- (Turkey) İzzet Türkyılmaz
- (Central African Republic) Kevarrius Hayes
- (Canada) (South Sudan) Marial Shayok
- (Serbia) Stefan Birčević
- (United States) Anthony Brown
- (United States) Xavier Munford
- (United States) (Puerto Rico) John Holland

== Honours ==
Turkish Basketball First League

- Winners (1): 2018–19

EuroCup

- Runner up (1): 2021–22

== Season by season ==
Season	Tier	League	Pos.	Record	Turkish Cup	European competitions	
2017–18	2	TBL	2nd				
2018–19	2	TBL	1st	25–5			
2019–20	1	BSL	9th^{1}	11–12			
2020–21	1	BSL	9th	13–17		2 EuroCup	RS
2021–22	1	BSL	8th	19–14		2 EuroCup	RU
2022–23	1	BSL	5th	17–15		2 EuroCup	8F
2023–24	1	BSL	9th	14–16		3 Champions League	RS
2024–25	1	BSL	9th	13–17		4 FIBA Europe Cup	RS
2025–26	1	BSL	12th	10–20		3 Champions League	RS

^1 Cancelled due to the COVID-19 pandemic in Europe.
