= Roberto Gallinat =

American basketball player (born 1996)

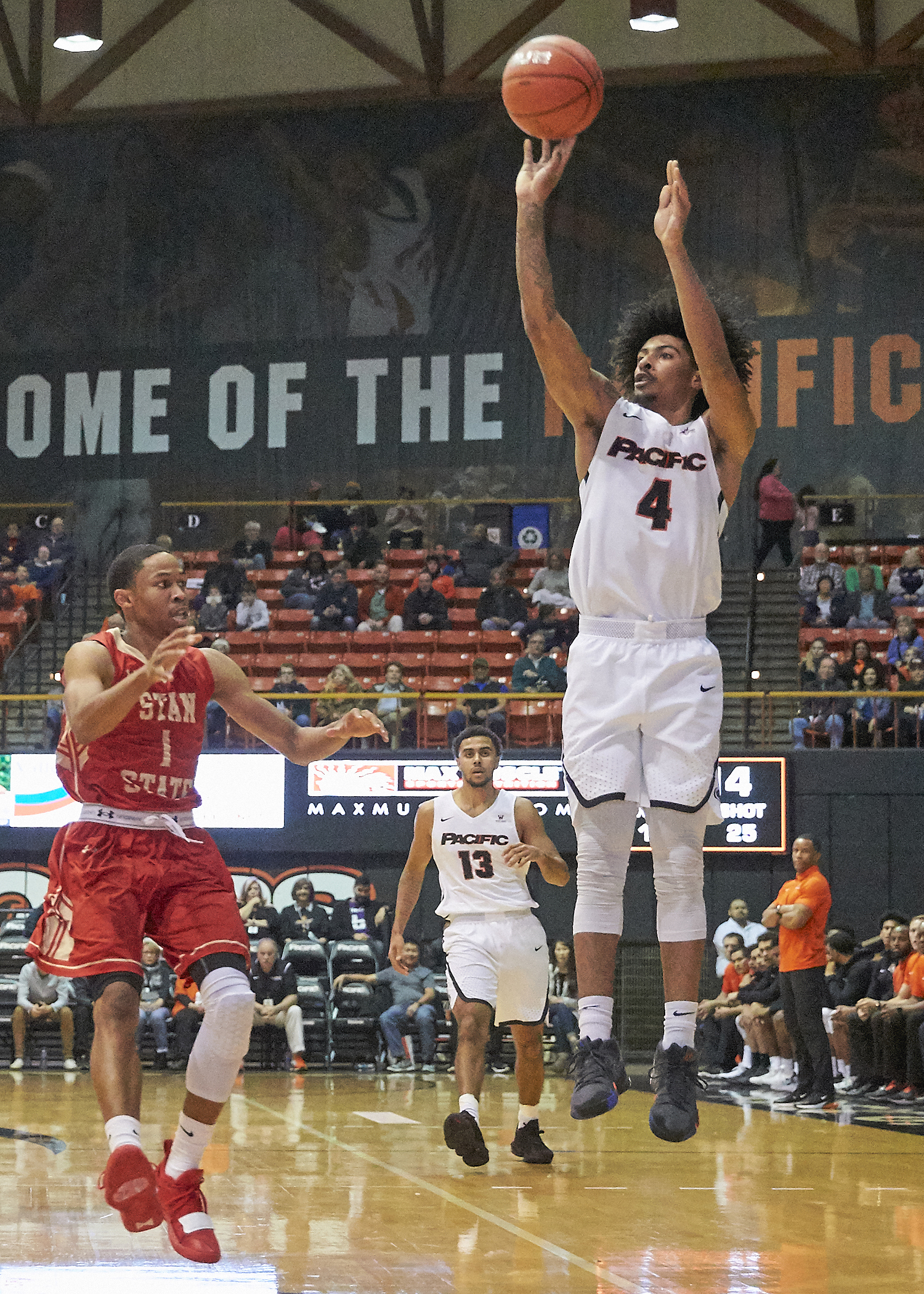
- Gallinat in action with Pacific

No. 44 – Çayırova Belediyespor
- Position: Shooting guard
- League: Basketbol Süper Ligi

Personal information
- Born: December 29, 1996 (age 29) Atlanta, Georgia, US
- Listed height: 1.92 m (6 ft 4 in)
- Listed weight: 82 kg (181 lb)

Career information
- High school: South Gwinnett (Snellville, Georgia)
- College: South Plains (2015–2017); Pacific (2017–2019)
- NBA draft: 2019: undrafted
- Playing career: 2019–present

Career history
- 2019–2020: Horsens
- 2020–2021: Eurobasket Roma
- 2021–2022: Yalovaspor
- 2022–2023: SLUC Nancy
- 2023: Karditsa
- 2023: Jiangxi Ganchi
- 2023–2024: Aris Thessaloniki
- 2024–2025: Maccabi Ramat Gan
- 2025: Karşıyaka Basket
- 2025–present: Çayırova Belediyespor

Career highlights
- Federation Cup winner (2026); Greek All-Star (2023); Basketligaen MVP (2020)

Roberto Tremaine Gallinat (born December 29, 1996) is an American professional basketball player for Çayırova Belediyespor of the Basketbol Süper Ligi (BSL). After playing four years of college basketball at South Plains and Pacific, Gallinat entered the 2019 NBA draft, but was not selected in the two rounds.

== High school career ==
During high school, Gallinat attended South Gwinnett High School, in Snellville, Georgia.

== College career ==
After high school, Gallinat played college basketball at South Plains College, from 2015 to 2017. In his last year at South Plains, Gallinat averaged 12.2 points per game. The following year, he transferred to Pacific. As a senior, he averaged 15.2 points and 3 rebounds per game.

== Professional career ==
After failing to be drafted in the 2019 NBA draft, Gallinat signed with Horsens of the Basketligaen. In the end of the season he was named the league's MVP.

On July 9, 2020, he joined Eurobasket Roma in Italy. The following season, Gallinat played in Turkey for Yalovaspor.

On June 27, 2022, Gallinat joined SLUC Nancy in France. On January 5, he left Nancy and 15 days later, he joined Karditsa of the Greek Basket League.

On September 4, 2023, Gallinat joined Aris Thessaloniki of the Greek Basket League. On January 17, 2024, Gallinat scored a game winning put-back dunk against Budućnost in the EuroCup.

On February 5, 2025, he signed with Karşıyaka Basket of the Basketbol Süper Ligi (BSL).

On July 22, 2025, he signed with Çayırova Belediyespor of the Türkiye Basketbol Ligi (TBL). On June 17, 2026, he extended his contract for another season after helping the team earn promotion.
