= Nysier Brooks =

American basketball player

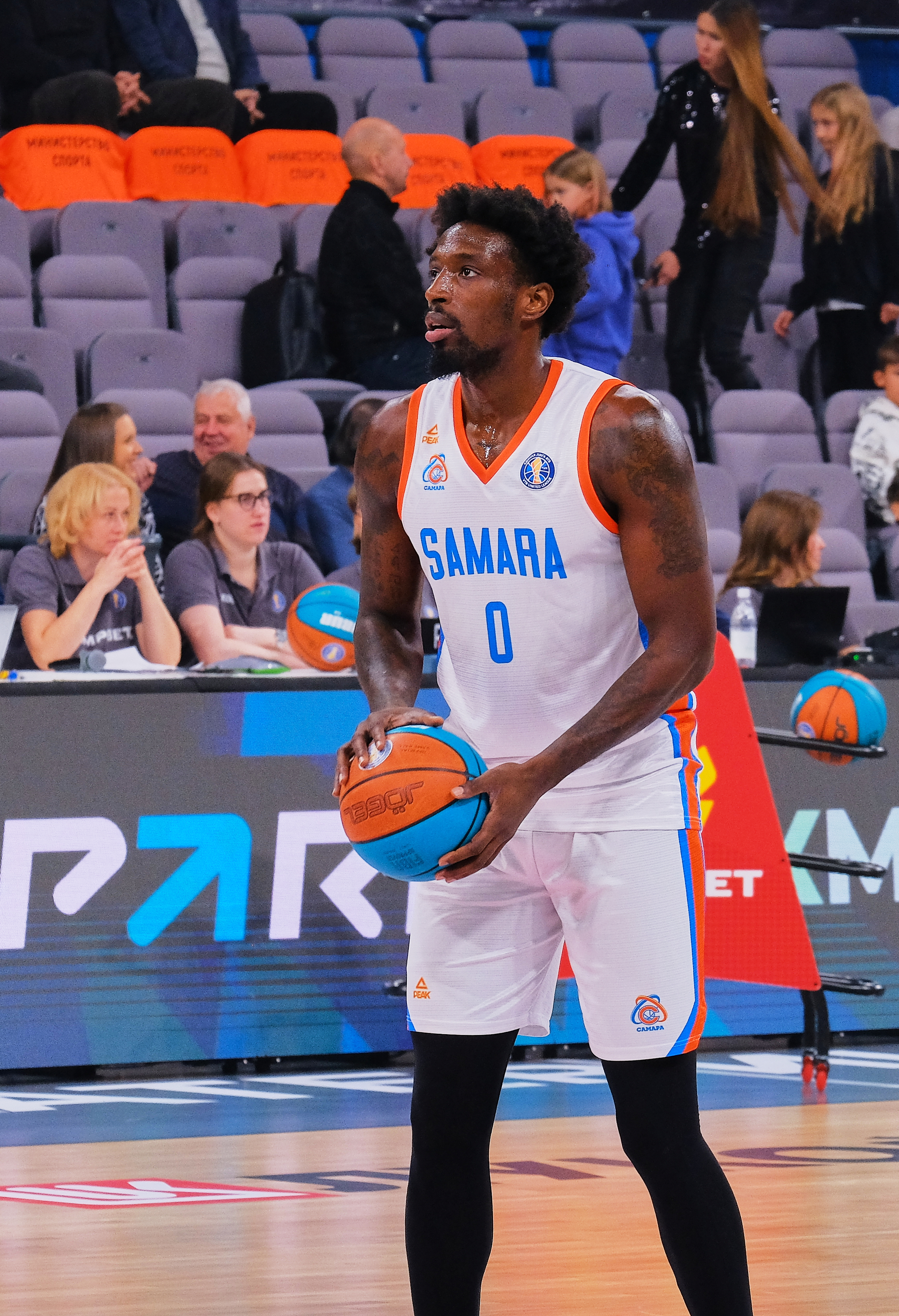
- Brooks playing for Samara in 2024

No. 0 – Çayırova Belediyespor
- Position: Center
- League: Basketbol Süper Ligi

Personal information
- Born: December 5, 1996 (age 29) Philadelphia, Pennsylvania, U.S.
- Listed height: 7 ft 0 in (2.13 m)
- Listed weight: 245 lb (111 kg)

Career information
- High school: Life Center Academy (Burlington, New Jersey)
- College: Cincinnati (2016–2019); Miami (Florida) (2020–2021); Ole Miss (2021–2022)
- NBA draft: 2022: undrafted
- Playing career: 2022–present

Career history
- 2022: Newfoundland Growlers
- 2022–2023: VEF Rīga
- 2023: Shijiazhuang Xianglan
- 2023–2024: SIG Strasbourg
- 2024: Samara
- 2024–2025: New Taipei CTBC DEA
- 2025–2026: Hapoel Holon
- 2026–present: Çayırova Belediyespor

Career highlights
- Latvian Cup champion (2023); LBL champion (2023); LBL Playoff MVP (2023); Federation Cup champion (2026)

Nysier Ta-Jhon Brooks (born December 5, 1996) is an American professional basketball player for Çayırova Belediyespor of the Basketbol Süper Ligi (BSL). He played college basketball for the Cincinnati Bearcats, the Miami Hurricanes, and the Ole Miss Rebels.

== College career ==
=== University of Cincinnati (2016-2019) ===
In November 2015, Brooks signed with the University of Cincinnati for the 2016-2017 season. He had given the team an oral commitment in June 2015. During his freshman season, he played in 33 games as a reserve where he averaged 2.4 points, 1.6 rebounds and 0.7 blocks. He earned the Legion of Excellence award for the highest grade-point average on the team and was named the Bearcats Academic Honor Roll and Dean's List during the spring 2017 semester.

During his sophomore season, he started two of 35 games played and averaged 2.6 points, 2.3 rebounds and 0.6 blocks. He was named to the Bearcats Academic Honor Roll during the 2017 fall semester.

In his junior season, he started all 35 games and averaged 8.1 points, 6.3 rebounds and 1.5 blocks. He ranked among the AAC leaders in blocks, offensive rebounds and rebounds. Brooks was named to the Bearcats Academic Honor Roll and Dean's List during the 2019 spring semester and tabbed to The American's All-Academic Team.

=== University of Miami (2019-2021) ===
In June 2019, Brooks transferred to the University of Miami after being named conference Defensive Player of the Year. He left the University of Cincinnati due to a coaching change and had to sit out the 2019-2020 season but was eligible for the 2020-2021 season.

During the 2020-2021 season, Brooks was a redshirt senior. He was one of two Hurricanes to play in all 27 games. He averaged 7.4 points, 5.8 rebounds and 1.0 blocked shot per game. He was ninth in the ACC in offensive rebounding and number 13 in blocks.

In March 2021, Brooks earned 2020-2021 All-ACC Academic Team as he had a 3.16 cumulative GPA as a criminology major with a minor in sociology. He had a 3.0 and higher GPA in two of his three semesters at Miami and had Honor Roll status in the spring of 2020.

=== University of Mississippi (2021-2022) ===
In April 2021, Brooks entered the transfer portal and committed to University of Mississippi for his final year of eligibility. He played and started in all 32 games at the center position. He averaged 9.8 points, 7.3 rebounds and 1.3 blocks per game. He ranked third in the SEC in offensive rebounds per game, sixth in blocks per game and eighth in total rebounds per game. He was named to SEC First Year Academic Honor Roll.

== Professional career ==
=== Newfoundland Growlers (2022) ===
After graduating, Brooks played for the Newfoundland Growlers of Canadian Elite Basketball League., averaging 10.9 points, 7.4 rebounds and 1.0 blocks per game.

=== VEF Riga (2022–2023) ===
He then signed with VEF Rīga of Latvian-Estonian Basketball League and Basketball Champions League. After becoming Latvian League finals MVP, Brooks signed with Shijiazhuang Xianglan in China.

=== SIG Strasbourg (2023–2024) ===
On 20 October 2023, Brooks returned to Europe, signing a contract with French SIG Strasbourg.

=== BC Samara (2024) ===
On July 11, 2024, Brooks signed with BC Samara of the VTB United League.

=== New Taipei CTBC DEA (2024–2025) ===
On December 17, 2024, Brooks signed with the New Taipei CTBC DEA of the Taiwan Professional Basketball League (TPBL).

=== Çayırova Belediyespor (2026–present) ===
On January 8, 2026, he signed with Çayırova Belediyespor of the Türkiye Basketbol Ligi (TBL). On June 18, 2026, he extended his contract for another season after helping the team earn promotion.
