= Deniz Kılıçlı =

Turkish basketball player (born 1990)

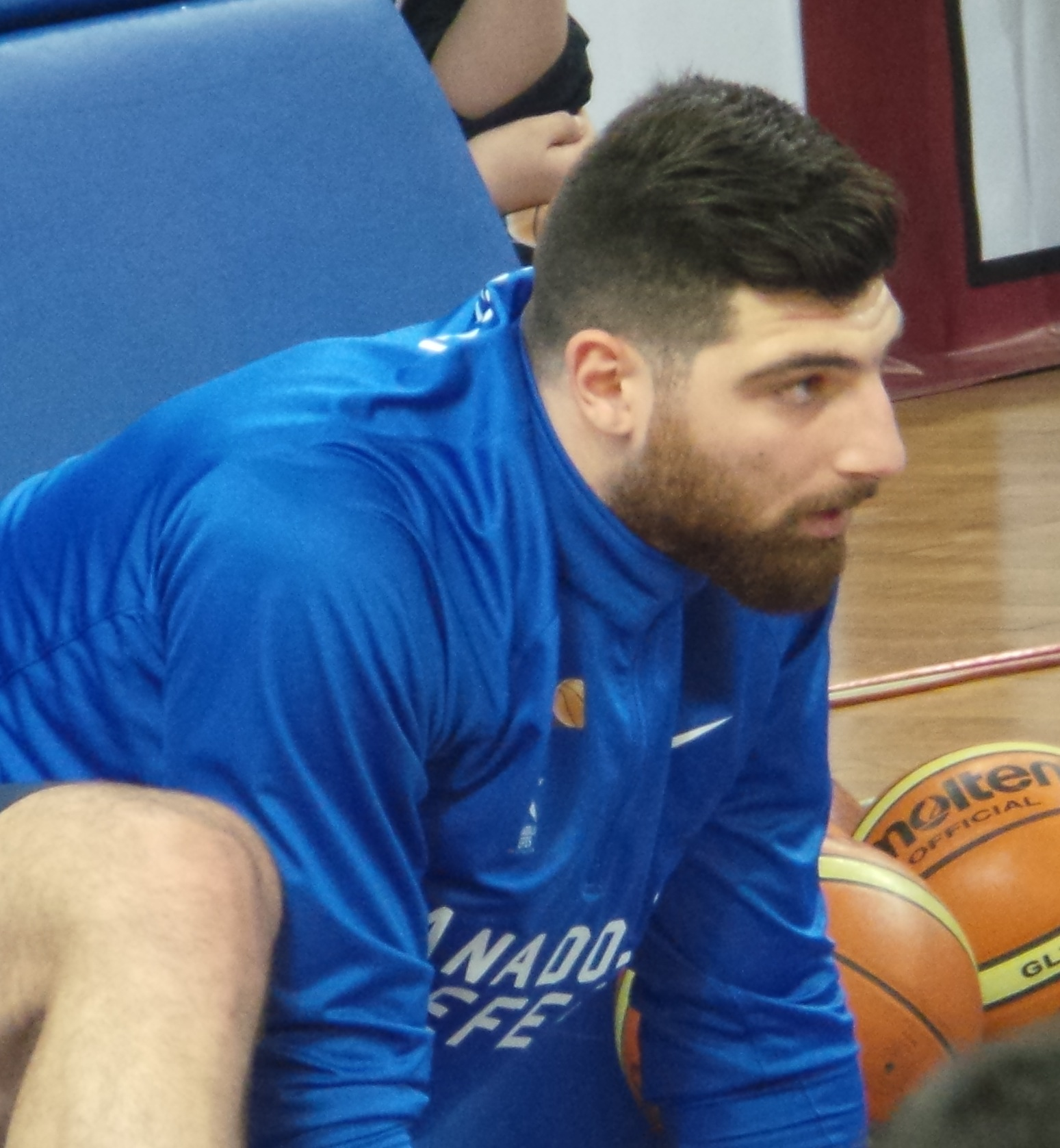
- Kılıçlı with the Anadolu Efes

Çayırova Belediye
- Position: Center
- League: TBL

Personal information
- Born: October 23, 1990 (age 36) Samsun, Turkey
- Listed height: 6 ft 9 in (2.06 m)
- Listed weight: 290 lb (132 kg)

Career information
- High school: Mountain State Academy (Beckley, West Virginia)
- College: West Virginia (2010–2013)
- NBA draft: 2013: undrafted
- Playing career: 2013–present

Career history
- 2013–2015: Anadolu Efes
- 2015–2017: İstanbul BB
- 2017: Trabzonspor
- 2017–2020: Büyükçekmece
- 2020–2021: Bahçeşehir Koleji
- 2021–2022: Büyükçekmece
- 2022–2024: Pınar Karşıyaka
- 2024: Ankaragücü Basketbol
- 2024–2025: Mersin MSK
- 2025–present: Çayırova Belediye

Career highlights
- Turkish Cup winner (2015); Federation Cup winner (2026)
Medals
Men's basketball
Representing Turkey
Mediterranean Games
Gold medal – first place	2013 Mersin	Team

Mükremin Deniz Kılıçlı (born October 23, 1990) is a Turkish professional basketball player for Çayırova Belediye of the Türkiye Basketbol Ligi (TBL).

== Collegiate career ==
=== Freshman season ===
After missing the first 20 games of the season because of a suspension delivered by NCAA for playing on a team in his native country that included a professional player, Kılıçlı made his Mountaineers debut in February 2010, and helped make an immediate impact.

== Professional career ==
After going undrafted in the 2013 NBA draft, Kılıçlı signed a contract with his homeland team Anadolu Efes Istanbul. In his first Euroleague season with the team, he averaged 1.9 points and 1.7 rebounds over 9 games. From 2015 to 2017 he played with İstanbul Büyükşehir Belediyespor

On December 11, 2017, he signed with Büyükçekmece Basketbol.

On July 4, 2020, he has signed with Bahçeşehir Koleji of the Turkish Basketball Super League (BSL).

On July 2, 2021, he has signed with Büyükçekmece Basketbol of the Turkish Basketball Super League (BSL).

On July 6, 2022, he has signed with Pınar Karşıyaka of the Basketbol Süper Ligi.

On July 14, 2024, he signed with Ankaragücü Basketbol of the Türkiye Basketbol Ligi (TBL).

On November 22, 2024, he signed with Mersin MSK of the Basketbol Süper Ligi (BSL).

On October 30, 2025, he signed with Çayırova Belediye of the Türkiye Basketbol Ligi (TBL).

== Personal life ==
Since 2015, he has been married to national volleyball player Büşra Cansu.

== Awards ==
=== National ===
- 2013 Mediterranean Games - Gold
