= Warren Washington (basketball) =

American basketball player (born 2000)

No. 22 – Bursaspor
- Position: Center
- League: BSL

Personal information
- Born: March 3, 2000 (age 26) Escondido, California, U.S.
- Listed height: 7 ft 0 in (2.13 m)
- Listed weight: 225 lb (102 kg)

Career information
- High school: Escondido (Escondido, California); Mission Hills (San Marcos, California)
- College: Oregon State (2018–2019); Nevada (2019–2022); Arizona State (2022–2023); Texas Tech (2023–2024)
- NBA draft: 2024: undrafted
- Playing career: 2024–present

Career history
- 2024–2025: Sioux Falls Skyforce
- 2025: Satria Muda Pertamina
- 2025: Memphis Hustle
- 2025–2026: Karditsa
- 2026: Lietkabelis Panevėžys
- 2026–present: Bursaspor
- Stats at NBA.com
- Stats at Basketball Reference

Warren Washington (born March 3, 2000) is an American professional basketball player for Bursaspor of the Basketbol Süper Ligi (BSL). He played college basketball for the Oregon State Beavers, the Nevada Wolf Pack, the Arizona State Sun Devils and the Texas Tech Red Raiders.

== High school career ==
Washington initially attended Escondido High School in Escondido, California where he won the CIF Division I championship as a freshman. In his senior season, he transferred to Mission Hills High School in San Marcos, California where he averaged 25.1 points, 12.9 rebounds and 2.4 blocks, earning a First Team All-San Diego selection that season and a First Team All-League selection as a senior and junior.

== College career ==
In five collegiate seasons, Washington played for Oregon State, Nevada, Arizona State and Texas Tech, finishing with 1,084 points, 755 rebounds and 150 blocks.

In his last season, he played in 25 games, starting 24, and averaged 9.7 points, 7.4 rebounds and 1.5 blocks in 26.8 minutes. However, he missed eight of the team's final 10 games with a foot injury. He scored in double-figures 12 times, grabbed double-figure rebounds five times and posted two double-doubles while recording eight multi-block games and finishing ninth in the conference in blocks as well.

== Professional career ==
=== Sioux Falls Skyforce (2024–2025) ===
After going undrafted in the 2024 NBA draft, Washington joined the Miami Heat for the 2024 NBA Summer League and on October 10, he signed an Exhibit 10 contract with the team. However, he was waived nine days later and on October 28, he joined the Sioux Falls Skyforce.

=== Lietkabelis Panevėžys (2026) ===
On 13 March 2026, Washington signed with Lietkabelis Panevėžys of the Lithuanian Basketball League (LKL).

=== Bursaspor Basketbol (2026–present) ===
On August 16, 2026, he signed with Bursaspor Basketbol of the Basketbol Süper Ligi (BSL).

== Personal life ==
The son of Calvin and Jamie Washington, he has a brother and a sister. He majored in Education Leadership.
