= Afyon Belediye S.K. =

HDI Sigorta Afyon Basket
- Nickname: Keçiler (The Goats)
- Leagues: Turkish Basketball Second League
- Founded: 1985; 41 years ago
- History: Afyon Belediyespor; 1985–present
- Arena: Prof. Dr. Veysel Eroğlu Sports Hall
- Capacity: 2,833
- Location: Afyonkarahisar, Turkey
- Team colors: Purple-White
- Main sponsor: HDI Sigorta
- President: Cömert Küce
- Head coach: Korhan Aydanarığ
- Team captain: Kenny Hayes
- Website: http://www.afyonbasket.org
Home	Away

Afyon Belediye S.K., commonly known as Afyon Belediye or simply Afyon, for sponsorship reasons HDI Sigorta Afyon Belediye, is a Turkish professional basketball club based in Afyonkarahisar, Turkey, which competes in the Turkish Basketball Second League, the third tier. Their home arena is Prof. Dr. Veysel Eroğlu Sports Hall with a capacity of 2,833 seats.

A former logo of the club

Formerly known as Afyonkarahisar Belediyespor, the team was founded and sponsored by Afyonkarahisar Municipality in 2013. In 2018, the club earned promotion to the first-tier Basketbol Süper Ligi (BSL) for the first time, after winning the TBL promotion play-offs.

Their first season in the BSL, 2018–2019, they finished 14th, avoiding relegation by one point. Their second season, they finished 13th, and in their third season, 2020–2021, they finished 10th. However the following season, 2021–22, the team would be relegated in 16th earning only 4 wins the whole season. The club was scheduled to play in the second tier Turkish Basketball First League, but due to financial issues, did not register. They were relegated again, and are currently due to play in the Turkish Basketball Second League, the third tier, but have failed to do so in the 2022–2023 season.

== Season by season ==
Season	Tier	League	Pos.	Record	Turkish Cup
2013–14	3	TB3L	1st	9–6	
2014–15	2	TB2L	15th	11–23	
2015–16	2	TB2L	8th	18–19	
2016–17	2	TBL	5th	24–15	
2017–18	2	TBL	3rd^{1}	24–15	
2018–19	1	BSL	14th	6–22	
2019–20	1	BSL	14th^{2}	7–15	
2020–21	1	BSL	10th	12–18	
2021–22	1	BSL	16th	4-26	

^1 Promoted as winners of the play-offs.
^2 Cancelled due to the COVID-19 pandemic in Europe.

== Players ==
=== Current roster ===
Note: Flags indicate national team eligibility at FIBA-sanctioned events. Players may hold other non-FIBA nationalities not displayed.

HDI Sigorta Afyon Belediye roster
Players
Coaches

Pos.	No.	Nat.	Name	Ht.	Wt.	Age
G	2	(Turkey)	Gedikli, Tuğberk	1.93 m (6 ft 4 in)	95 kg (209 lb)	34 – 13 October 1991
SG	5	(Turkey)	Solkol, Mertcan	1.98 m (6 ft 6 in)	92 kg (203 lb)	30 – 5 February 1996
PF	6	(Turkey)	Aksu, Berkan	2.04 m (6 ft 8 in)	91 kg (201 lb)	25 – 5 January 2001
PG	8	(Turkey)	Edge, Şafak	1.85 m (6 ft 1 in)	84 kg (185 lb)	34 – 17 June 1992
PF	10	(Turkey)	Ülker, Barış	2.03 m (6 ft 8 in)	97 kg (214 lb)	29 – 17 January 1997
SF	11	(Turkey)	Özkapıcı, Onur	1.96 m (6 ft 5 in)	90 kg (198 lb)	31 – 17 March 1995
SF	23	(Turkey)	Çevirgen, Hüseyin	1.88 m (6 ft 2 in)	100 kg (220 lb)	25 – 29 September 2000

Head coach

- (Turkey) Korhan Aydanarığ

Assistant coach(es)

- (Turkey) Erhan Yetim

Legend

- (C) Team captain
- Injured

- Roster
Updated: August 5, 2022

=== Notable players ===
Note: Flags indicate national team eligibility at FIBA-sanctioned events. Players may hold other non-FIBA nationalities not displayed.

Criteria

To appear in this section a player must have either:

- Set a club record or won an individual award while at the club
- Played at least one official international match for their national team at any time
- Played at least one official NBA match at any time.

- (Turkey) Cemal Nalga
- (Turkey) Cevher Özer
- (Turkey) Egemen Güven
- (Bulgaria) Earl Calloway
- (Georgia (country)) Jacob Pullen
- (Greece) Christos Tapoutos
- (Lithuania) Evaldas Kairys
- (Lithuania) Edgaras Želionis
- (Lithuania) Donatas Tarolis
- (Mexico) Paco Cruz
- (Nigeria) Talib Zanna
- (Rwanda) Darrius Garrett
- (Serbia) Mihajlo Andrić
- (Slovenia) Miha Zupan
- (Slovenia) Gregor Hrovat
- (United States) Mustafa Shakur
- (United States) Quincy Douby
- (United States) J. P. Macura
- (United States) Wayne Selden Jr.
- (United States) Pierre Jackson

== Sponsors ==
Shirt manufracturer	Barex
Front sponsor	HDI Sigorta
