= Chris Coffey =

Greek basketball player (born 1995)

No. 22 – Konyaspor
- Position: Power forward / center
- League: Türkiye Basketbol Ligi

Personal information
- Born: August 7, 1997 (age 29) Louisville, Kentucky, U.S.
- Listed height: 6 ft 7 in (2.01 m)
- Listed weight: 225 lb (102 kg)

Career information
- High school: Seneca (Louisville, Kentucky)
- College: Georgetown (Kentucky) (2015–2020)
- NBA draft: 2020: undrafted
- Playing career: 2020–present

Career history
- 2020–2021: Ventspils
- 2021–2022: Mitteldeutscher
- 2022–2023: Kolossos Rodou
- 2023–2024: Promitheas Patras
- 2024–2025: Peristeri
- 2025–present: Konyaspor

Career highlights
- Greek League rebounding leader (2025); NAIA Division I tournament MVP (2019); First-team NAIA Division I All-American (2019)

Christopher Coffey (born August 7, 1997) is an American professional basketball player for Konyaspor of the TBL. He plays at both the power forward and center positions.

== Early life and education ==
Coffey attended Seneca High School MCA at Louisville, Kentucky.

== College career ==
Coffey played for Georgetown Tigers (KY) from 2015 to 2020. He was named the NAIA Division I tournament MVP on 2019 after recording 10 points and 16 rebounds against Carroll.

== Professional career ==
After going undrafted in the 2020 NBA draft, Coffey joined Ventspils of the Latvian–Estonian Basketball League.

After a successful year with Ventspils, he joined Mitteldeutscher of the Basketball Bundesliga.

On November 13, 2023, he joined Kolossos Rodou of the Greek Basket League. On June 29, 2023, he was moved to another Greek team, signing with Promitheas Patras.

On December 28, 2024, Coffey joined Peristeri. He became the top rebounder of the league, averaging 7.5 rebounds per game.

On July 16, 2025, Coffey joined Konyaspor of the TBL.
