= Darüşşafaka Basketbol =

Darüşşafaka Lassa
- Nickname: Daçka Basketbol; Daçka
- Leagues: Türkiye Basketbol Ligi
- Founded: 1914; 112 years ago
- History: List: Darüşşafaka Basketbol (1914–2008) Darüşşafaka Cooper Tires Basketbol (2008–2010) Darüşşafaka Basketbol (2010–2013) Darüşşafaka Doğuş Basketbol (2013–2017) Darüşşafaka Basketbol (2017–2018) Darüşşafaka Tekfen Basketbol (2018–2021) Darüşşafaka Basketbol (2021–2023) Darüşşafaka Lassa (2023–present)
- Arena: Darüşşafaka Ayhan Şahenk (BSL); Volkswagen Arena (Basketball Champions League)
- Capacity: Darüşşafaka Ayhan Şahenk - 3,500; Volkswagen Arena - 5,240
- Location: Istanbul, Turkey
- Team colours: Green, black
- President: Ata Salim Celayir
- Team manager: Ahmet Eran
- Head coach: Erdi Özten (interim)
- Team captain: Berkay Taşkıran
- Championships: 1 EuroCup; 2 Turkish Championships; 1 Turkish Second Division
- Website: darussafakabasketbol.com
Home	Away	Third

Darüşşafaka Basketbol (Darüşşafaka Basketball), commonly also known as Daçka Basketbol or simply Daçka, also known as Darüşşafaka Lassa for sponsorship reasons, is a professional basketball club that is based in Istanbul, Turkey. Darüşşafaka's basketball section, which was founded in 1914, is a part of Darüşşafaka Spor Kulübü (Darüşşafaka Sports Club) multi-sport club, which was founded in 1914. The club's basketball department is their most successful section. The club plays in the Türkiye Basketbol Ligi. Its home arena for national domestic games is the Darüşşafaka Ayhan Şahenk Sports Hall, with a seating capacity of 3,500, while its home arena for European-wide games is the Volkswagen Arena Istanbul, with a seating capacity of 5,240.

Daçka have won two Turkish Basketball Championships (in 1961 and 1962) over the course of their history. In European-wide competitions they have won the second tier level EuroCup, in the 2017–18 season, by defeating the Russian club Lokomotiv Kuban in the finals.

== History ==
From 1993 until 2010, Darüşşafaka was a stable TBL (now called BSL) competitor. In the 2000–01 and 2001–02 seasons, the team took the third place in the regular season. In the 2009–10 season, the club ended up in 16th place in the TBL, and was relegated. The team was then a middle-tier team in the TB2L, from 2010 until 2013.

In 2013, Doğuş Holding became the main sponsor of the team, which instantly turned Darüşşafaka into a wealthy and ambitious club. In the 2013–14 season, they won the TB2L title, and were promoted to the TBL (now called BSL).

In the 2014–15 season, Darüşşafaka took the third place in the regular season, after some big names like Renaldas Seibutis and Jamon Gordon were signed for the season. Despite the huge expectations, the team lost in the quarterfinals of the league playoffs to Trabzonspor.

The team received a wild card for the 2015–16 EuroLeague season. Darüşşafaka started playing its EuroLeague home games at the Volkswagen Arena Istanbul, starting from November 2015. In September 2018, the club announced a new multi-year sponsorship deal with Tekfen, which changed the team's name sponsorship name to Darüşşafaka Tekfen.

After a challenging season, the team finished 15th in the 2024–25 Basketbol Süper Ligi and was relegated to the Türkiye Basketbol Ligi, ending an 11-year run in the top division.

== Sponsorship naming ==
Due to sponsorship deals, Darüşşafaka have been also known as:

- Darüşşafaka (1992–2008)
- Darüşşafaka Cooper Tires (2008–2010)
- Darüşşafaka (2010–2013)
- Darüşşafaka Doğuş (2013–2017)
- Darüşşafaka (2017–2018)
- Darüşşafaka Tekfen (2018–2021)
- Darüşşafaka (2021–2023)
- Darüşşafaka Lassa (2023–present)

== Arenas ==
Darüşşafaka plays its national domestic Turkish Basketball Super League home games at the 3,500 seat Darüşşafaka Ayhan Şahenk Sports Hall. In November 2015, the 5,240 seat Volkswagen Arena Istanbul was officially inaugurated as the home arena of Darüşşafaka for EuroLeague home games.

== Season by season ==
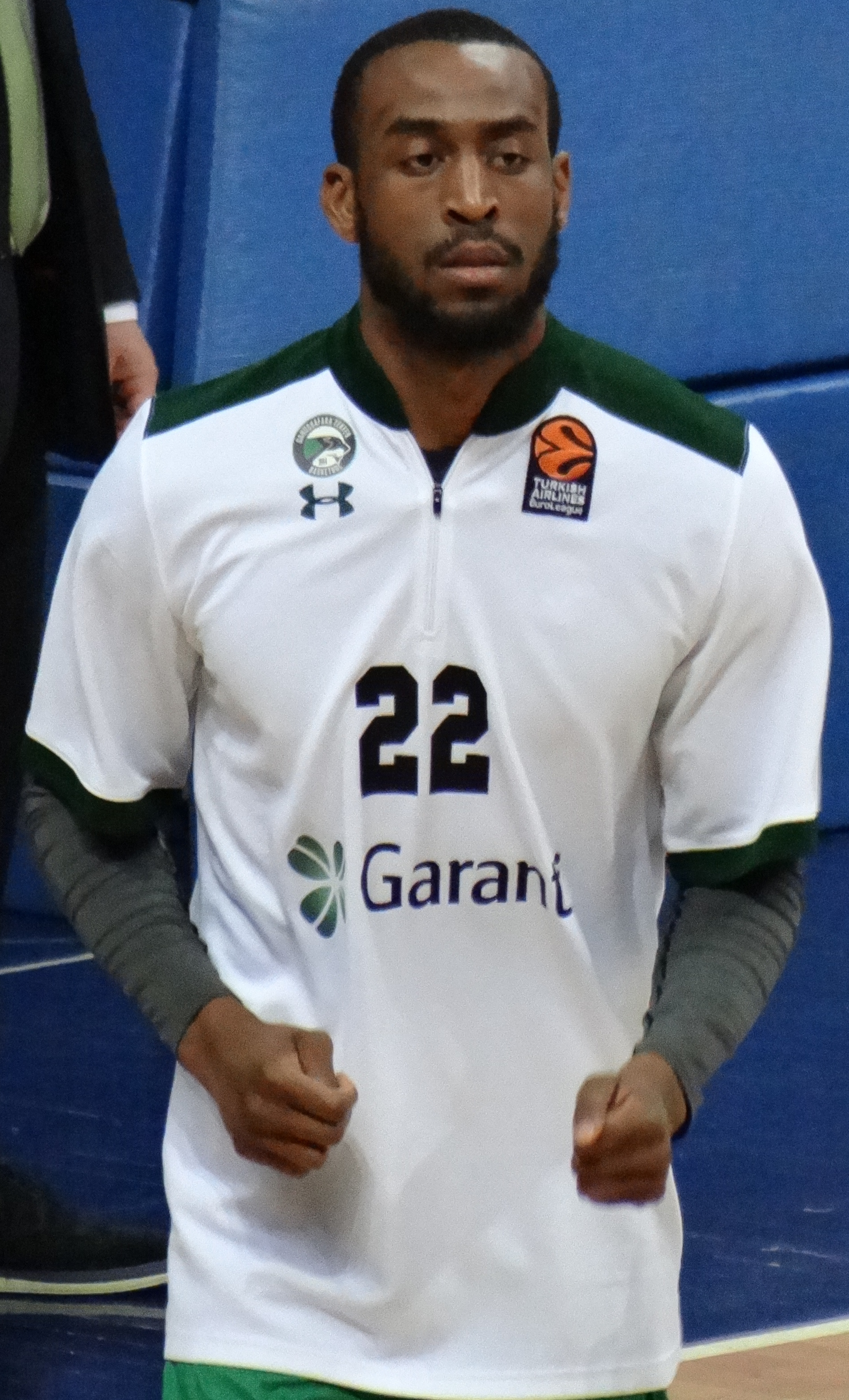
Markel Brown playing for the team in 2018.

Season	Tier	League	Pos.	Turkish Cup	European competitions	
2000–01	1	TBL	3rd		3 Korać Cup	EF
2001–02	1	TBL	3rd	Runner-up	2 Saporta Cup	RS
2002–03	1	TBL	9th		2 ULEB Cup	RS
2003–04	1	TBL	6th			
2004–05	1	TBL	10th		2 ULEB Cup	RS
2005–06	1	TBL	9th			
2006–07	1	TBL	8th			
2007–08	1	TBL	14th			
2008–09	1	TBL	8th			
2009–10	1	TBL	16th			
2010–11	2	TB2L	8th			
2011–12	2	TB2L	11th			
2012–13	2	TB2L	7th			
2013–14	2	TB2L	1st			
2014–15	1	TBL	5th	Semifinalist		
2015–16	1	BSL	4th	Runner-up	1 Euroleague	T16
2016–17	1	BSL	4th	Quarterfinalist	1 EuroLeague	QF
2017–18	1	BSL	6th	Semifinals	2 EuroCup	C
2018–19	1	BSL	10th		1 EuroLeague	RS
2019–20	1	BSL	6th^{1}		2 EuroCup	–^{1}
2020–21	1	BSL	7th		2 Champions League	RS
2021–22	1	BSL	4th	Semifinalist	2 Champions League	R16
2022–23	1	BSL	6th		2 Champions League	R16
2023–24	1	BSL	14th		2 Champions League	PI
2024–25	1	BSL	15th			
2025–26	2	TBL	11th	Quarterfinalist		

Source: Eurobasket.com

^1 Cancelled due to the COVID-19 pandemic in Europe.

== Honours ==
=== European competitions ===
- EuroCup

Winners (1): 2017–18

=== Domestic competitions ===
- Turkish Basketball Championship

Winners (2): 1961, 1962
Runners-up (1): 1960

- Turkish Cup

Runners-up (3): 2002, 2016, 2020

- Turkish Basketball Second Division

Winners (1): 2014

- Istanbul Basketball League (defunct)

Winners (1): 1960
Third place (3): 1961, 1962, 1963

=== Other competitions ===
- Sibenik, Croatia Invitational Game

Winners (1): 2015

- Antalya, Turkey Invitational Game

Winners (1): 2016

- Heimspiel Kranz Parkhotel Cup

Winners (1): 2016

- Zadar Dogus Basketball Tournament

Winners (1): 2016

- Casale Monferrat, Italy Invitational Game

Winners (1): 2018

- Lumezzane, Italy Invitational Game

Winners (1): 2018

== Players ==
=== Current roster ===
Note: Flags indicate national team eligibility at FIBA-sanctioned events. Players may hold other non-FIBA nationalities not displayed.

Darüşşafaka roster
Players
Coaches

Pos.	No.	Nat.	Name	Ht.	Wt.	Age
PG	0	(United States)	Sharkey, Josh	1.78 m (5 ft 10 in)		29 – 10 September 1997
	1	(Turkey)	Çelik, Arda			18 – 23 July 2008
PG	3	(United States)	Crews, Trey	1.88 m (6 ft 2 in)		30 – 3 March 1996
G	7	(Turkey)	Eskinazi, Ege	1.88 m (6 ft 2 in)		24 – 27 October 2002
G	10	(Turkey)	Tanrıver, Reşit	1.91 m (6 ft 3 in)		18 – 13 June 2008
F	11	(Turkey)	Ene, Ahmet Arda	2.03 m (6 ft 8 in)		18 – 8 November 2008
	12	(Turkey)	Elgün, Yiğit			25 – 8 August 2001
PF	13	(Turkey)	Karabilen, İsmail	2.03 m (6 ft 8 in)		25 – 2 July 2001
F	14	(Turkey)	Sert, Mert Ali	1.98 m (6 ft 6 in)		30 – 14 July 1996
SG	19	(Turkey)	İlyem, Eren	1.93 m (6 ft 4 in)		20 – 20 February 2006
PF	20	(Turkey)	Akçay, Ege	1.98 m (6 ft 6 in)		20 – 12 June 2006
G/F	33	(Turkey)	Terzi, Berkay	2.03 m (6 ft 8 in)		23 – 9 July 2003
	69	(Turkey)	Ertaş, Eren			18 – 6 February 2008

Head coach

- (Turkey) Hüsnü Eser

Assistant coach(es)

- (Turkey) Agah Olcaytu Hamza
- (Turkey) Ahmet Yasin Ekinci

Legend

- (C) Team captain
- Injured

- Roster
Updated: October 18, 2026

=== Notable players ===
Note: Flags indicate national team eligibility at FIBA-sanctioned events. Players may hold other non-FIBA nationalities not displayed.

Criteria

To appear in this section a player must have either:

- Set a club record or won an individual award while at the club
- Played at least one official international match for their national team at any time
- Played at least one official NBA match at any time.

- (Turkey) Cüneyt Erden
- (Turkey) Semih Erden
- (Turkey) Tufan Ersöz
- (Turkey) Sinan Güler
- (Turkey) Hakan Köseoğlu
- (Turkey) Cevher Özer
- (Turkey) Erdem Türetken
- (Turkey) / (Georgia (country)) Zaza Enden
- (Turkey) / (United States) Erwin Dudley
- (Turkey) / (United States) Scottie Wilbekin
- (United States) Michael Ansley
- (United States) Marques Bragg
- (United States) Will Clyburn
- (United States) Bonzie Colson
- (United States) Jermareo Davidson
- (United States) Toney Douglas
- (United States) Acie Earl
- (United States) / (Israel) Jordan Farmar
- (United States) Richie Frahm
- (United States) Kelvin Gibbs
- (United States) Sean Green
- (United States) Cliff Hammonds
- (United States) JaJuan Johnson
- (United States) Maarty Leunen
- (United States) Steve Rogers
- (United States) (Uganda) Nike Sibande
- (United States) Lamont Strothers
- (United States) Brad Wanamaker
- (Canada) / (Germany) Michael Meeks
- (Croatia) Ante Žižić
- (France) Adrien Moerman
- (Kosovo) Yll Kaçaniku
- (Latvia) Dairis Bertāns
- (Lithuania) Renaldas Seibutis
- (Russia) Vitaly Nosov

== Head coaches ==
Head Coach	Years
(Turkey) Yalçın Granit	1957–1960
(Turkey) Erman Kunter	1994–1996
(Turkey) Ahmet Çakı	2004–2006, 2018
(Turkey) Orhun Ene	2013–2014
(Turkey) Oktay Mahmuti	2014–2016
(Israel) David Blatt	2016–2018
(Turkey) Selçuk Ernak	2018–2023
(Turkey) Yakup Sekizkök	2023–2024
(Turkey) Rüçhan Tamsöz	2024
(United States) Josh King	2024
(Spain) Carles Durán	2024–2025
(Turkey) Erdi Özten (interim)	2025–present
