= Göztepe S.K. (basketball) =

Göztepe
- Leagues: TBL
- Founded: 2024; 2 years ago
- Arena: Altındağ Atatürk Spor Kompleksi
- Capacity: 1,920
- Location: İzmir, Turkey
- Team colors: Red, Yellow
- President: Rasmus Ankersen
- Head coach: Rüçhan Tamsöz
- Team captain: Fatih Cantitiz
- 2024–25 position: TB2L Group A, 3rd of 8 (promoted via play-offs)
- Website: Official website
Home	Away

Göztepe S.K. is a Turkish professional basketball club based in İzmir. Currently, the team plays in the Turkish Basketball First League. The basketball team is part of the multi-sports club Göztepe S.K..

== History ==
Re-established in 2024, the team competed in the Basketbol Süper Ligi league during the 1968–69 and 2002–03 seasons. The basketball department was later discontinued due to financial difficulties. As of the 2021–22 season, the restructured team prioritized the establishment of its youth system. In their first season, Göztepe finished as runners-up in the U14 men's category at the national level and also contributed three players to the national youth teams. Among the club's long-term objectives is the development of youth teams capable of competing in the Turkish championships across all age categories, with the aim of forming the senior team through its own resources. In the 2024–25 season, coinciding with the club's centenary, the senior team was re-established and began competing in the Turkish Basketball Second League.

== Current roster ==
Göztepe Spor Kulübü roster
Players
Coaches

Pos.	No.	Nat.	Name	Ht.	Wt.	Age
PG	2	(United States)	Barnes, Jordan			29 – 13 September 1997
PG	4	(Turkey)	Urşan, Can			27 – 4 August 1999
C	6	(Turkey)	Seniçeli, Ferhat			24 – 12 August 2002
SF	7	(Turkey)	Esen, Murat Can			36 – 2 January 1990
SF	9	(Turkey)	Cantitiz, Fatih (C)			34 – 31 May 1992
C	10	(Senegal)	Gueye, Abdoulaye			31 – 24 November 1994
SF	12	(Turkey)	Beşok, Kaan			20 – 25 December 2005
SF	14	(Turkey)	Aydın, Ali Umut			26 – 10 June 2000
PF	21	(Turkey)	Türk, Koralp			23 – 2 January 2003
PF	22	(Turkey)	Savut, Deniz			20 – 4 July 2006
PG	23	(Turkey)	Geçen, Umut			29 – 1 January 1997
SF	28	(Turkey)	Sarı, Yiğit			23 – 21 April 2003
C	33	(Turkey)	Şenkahya, Kılıçarslan			26 – 21 August 2000
SG	35	(Turkey)	Büyükcangaz, Eray			22 – 1 January 2004
SG	77	(Turkey)	Orgun, Doğukan			21 – 1 August 2005

Head coach

- (Turkey) Rüçhan Tamsöz

Assistant coach(es)

- (Turkey) Ahmet Hakan Demirci
- (Turkey) Engin Erel
- (Turkey) Nehir Berk

Legend

- (C) Team captain
- Injured

- Roster
Updated: January 14, 2026
