= Darüşşafaka Ayhan Şahenk Sports Hall =

Indoor arena in Istanbul, Turkey

- Darüşşafaka Ayhan Şahenk Sports Hall
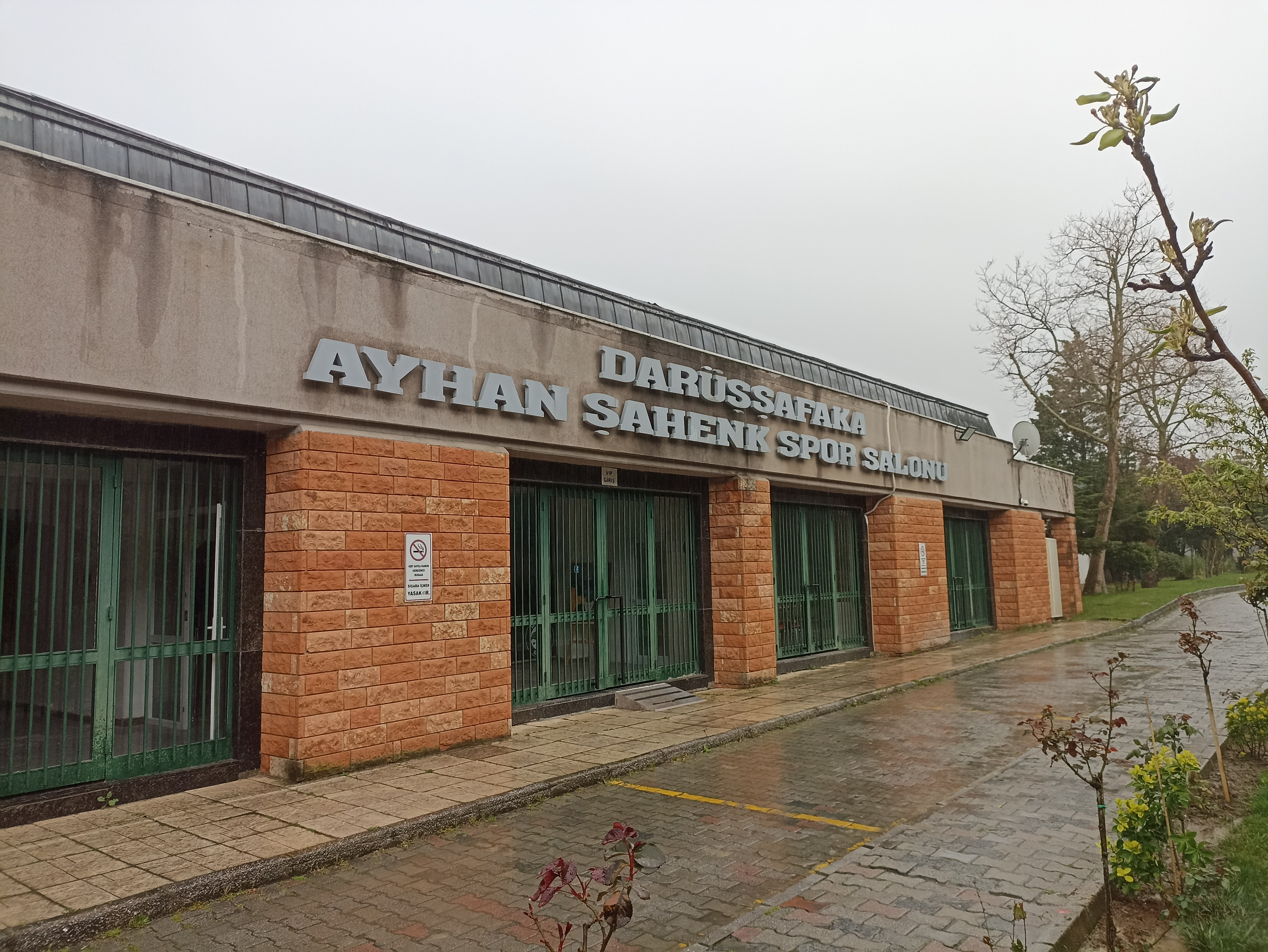
- Interactive map of Darüşşafaka Ayhan Şahenk Sports Hall
- Location: Büyükdere Caddesi, Derbent Mevkisi, Sarıyer, Istanbul
- Coordinates: 41°07′35″N 29°01′44″E
- Owner: TBF
- Capacity: Basketball: 3,500

Construction
- Opened: 1995

Tenant
- Darüşşafaka

Website
- https://www.darussafaka.org/hakkimizda/cemiyet/darussafaka-spor-kulubu

Darüşşafaka Ayhan Şahenk Sports Hall (Turkish: Darüşşafaka Ayhan Şahenk Spor Salonu) is a multi-purpose indoor arena that is located in Istanbul, Turkey. The arena is mostly used to host basketball games, but can also be used to host artistic and cultural events. It has a seating capacity for 3,500 spectators.

== History ==
Darüşşafaka Ayhan Şahenk Sports Hall opened in 1995, and is the home arena of the Turkish Super League team Darüşşafaka. It was also for a while, the home arena of the Turkish Super League club Anadolu Efes. Galatasaray men's basketball and Galatasaray women's basketball teams have also used the arena to host home games.
