= Turkish Basketball Federation Cup =

Turkish Basketball Federation Cup Federasyon Kupası
- Current season, competition or edition: 2026 Turkish Basketball Federation Cup
- Founded: 2012; 14 years ago
- No. of teams: 8
- Country: Turkey
- Confederation: FIBA Europe
- Related competitions: Türkiye Basketbol Ligi
- Website: tbf.org.tr

The Turkish Basketball Federation Cup (Turkish: Basketbol Erkekler Federasyon Kupası), is the Turkey men's professional second-tier basketball league cup tournament. It has been held and organised by the Turkish Basketball Federation since 2012. It is contested annually by clubs from the Türkiye Basketbol Ligi.

== Performance by club ==
Club	Winners	Runners-up
Esenler Erokspor	1	0
TED Ankara Kolejliler	1	0
Manisa Basket	1	0
Sigortam.net	1	0
Final Gençlik	1	0
Mamak Bld. Yeni Mamak Spor	1	0
Bahçeşehir Koleji	1	0
Eskişehir Basket	1	0
Tofaş	1	0
Best Balıkesir	1	0
İstanbul BB	1	0
Bandırma Kırmızı	1	0
Çayırova Belediyespor	1	0
Samsunspor	0	2
Akhisar Belediyespor	0	2
Konya BB	0	2
Yalovaspor	0	1
PETKİM	0	1
Bursaspor	0	1
Türk Telekom	0	1
İstanbul Beylikdüzü	0	1
Denizli Basket	0	1
Torku Konyaspor	0	1

== Finals ==
Note: Flags indicate national team eligibility at FIBA-sanctioned events. Players may hold other non-FIBA nationalities not displayed.

Season	Venue	Winners	Score	Runners-up	Ref.
2012	Bursa	Bandırma Kırmızı	73–64	Torku Selçuk Üniversitesi	
2013	Ankara	İstanbul BB	94–41	Akhisar Belediyespor	
2014	Bursa	Best Balıkesir	102–89	Denizli Basket	
2015	Istanbul	Tofaş	90–69	Akhisar Belediyespor	
2016–17	Mersin	Eskişehir Basket	84–79	İstanbul Beylikdüzü	
2017–18	Afyonkarahisar	Bahçeşehir Koleji	89–59	Türk Telekom	
2018	Afyonkarahisar	Mamak Bld. Yeni Mamak Spor	75–68	Bursaspor	
2019	Eskişehir	Final Gençlik	97–95	PETKİM	
2020	Kocaeli	Sigortam.net	84–76	Semt77 Yalovaspor	
2021	Ankara	Manisa Basket	78–77	Samsunspor	
2022	Ankara	TED Ankara Kolejliler	103–107	Samsunspor	
2025	Istanbul	Esenler Erokspor	69–66	Konya BB	
2026	Istanbul	Çayırova Belediyespor	70–52	Konya BB	

== See also ==
- Men's
- Turkish Men's Basketball League
- Turkish Men's Basketball Cup
- Turkish Men's Basketball Presidential Cup
- Turkish Men's Basketball Federation Cup
- Women's
- Turkish Women's Basketball League
- Turkish Women's Basketball Cup
- Turkish Women's Basketball Presidential Cup
- Turkish Women's Basketball Federation Cup
