= 2023–24 Anadolu Efes S.K. season =

44th season

Anadolu Efes
2023–24 season
- President: Tuncay Özilhan
- Head coach: Erdem Can (until 1 February 2024); Tomislav Mijatović (from 1 February 2024)
- Arena: Sinan Erdem Dome
- Basketbol Süper Ligi: Runners-up
- EuroLeague: Play-in
- Turkish Basketball Cup: Runners-up
Home	Away

The 2023–24 season is Anadolu Efes S.K.'s 44th season. They competed in the Basketball Super League and the EuroLeague.

== Players ==
=== Squad information ===
Note: Flags indicate national team eligibility at FIBA-sanctioned events. Players may hold other non-FIBA nationalities not displayed.

Anadolu Efes roster
Players
Coaches

Pos.	No.	Nat.	Name	Ht.	Wt.	Age
PG	0	(United States)	Larkin, Shane (C)	1.83 m (6 ft 0 in)	79 kg (174 lb)	33 – 2 October 1992
PG	1	(France)	Beaubois, Rodrigue (C)	1.88 m (6 ft 2 in)	84 kg (185 lb)	38 – 24 February 1988
G/F	6	(United States)	Bryant, Elijah	1.96 m (6 ft 5 in)	95 kg (209 lb)	31 – 19 April 1995
C	8	(Turkey)	Altuntaş, Salih	2.10 m (6 ft 11 in)		20 – 27 February 2006
SG	9	(Turkey)	Tunca, Melih	1.97 m (6 ft 6 in)		20 – 13 October 2005
G	10	(Turkey)	Öncel, Rıdvan	1.91 m (6 ft 3 in)	83 kg (183 lb)	29 – 21 February 1997
SG	11	(Turkey)	Gazi, Erten	1.91 m (6 ft 3 in)	93 kg (205 lb)	29 – 15 June 1997
SF	12	(United States)	Clyburn, Will	2.01 m (6 ft 7 in)	95 kg (209 lb)	36 – 17 May 1990
G	13	(United States)	Thompson, Darius	1.93 m (6 ft 4 in)	89 kg (196 lb)	31 – 4 May 1995
G	18	(Turkey)	Özdemiroğlu, Doğuş	1.91 m (6 ft 3 in)	88 kg (194 lb)	30 – 17 April 1996
F	19	(Turkey)	Yıldızlı, Burak Can	2.03 m (6 ft 8 in)	82 kg (181 lb)	32 – 22 April 1994
C	21	(Germany)	Pleiß, Tibor	2.21 m (7 ft 3 in)	116 kg (256 lb)	36 – 2 November 1989
PG	23	(Germany)	Hollatz, Justus	1.91 m (6 ft 3 in)	82 kg (181 lb)	25 – 21 April 2001
F/C	24	(Albania) (Turkey)	Osmani, Ercan	2.13 m (7 ft 0 in)	102 kg (225 lb)	28 – 4 August 1998
PF	25	(United States) (Nigeria)	Oturu, Daniel	2.03 m (6 ft 8 in)	109 kg (240 lb)	27 – 20 September 1999
C	31	(United States)	Daum, Mike	2.06 m (6 ft 9 in)	107 kg (236 lb)	30 – 30 October 1995
G/F	33	(Turkey)	Yılmaz, Erkan	1.96 m (6 ft 5 in)	87 kg (192 lb)	28 – 3 December 1997
PF	35	(United States)	Willis, Derek	2.06 m (6 ft 9 in)	104 kg (229 lb)	31 – 21 June 1995
C	88	(United States)	Jones, Tyrique	2.06 m (6 ft 9 in)	108 kg (238 lb)	29 – 3 May 1997

Head coach

- (Croatia) Tomislav Mijatović

Assistant coach(es)

- (Turkey) Ümit Temoçin
- (Turkey) Serhan Aydanarığ

Team manager

- (Turkey) Alper Yılmaz

Legend

- (C) Team captain
- (DC) Dual citizenship
- Injured

- Roster
Updated: 3 May 2024

=== Depth chart ===
Pos.	Starting 5	Bench 1	Bench 2	Bench 3	Inactive
C	Daniel Oturu	Tibor Pleiß	Ercan Osmani		Salih Altuntaş
PF	Derek Willis	Tyrique Jones	Mike Daum	Burak Can Yıldızlı
SF	Will Clyburn	Elijah Bryant		Erkan Yılmaz
SG	Shane Larkin	Rodrigue Beaubois		Erten Gazi
PG	Darius Thompson	Doğuş Özdemiroğlu	Justus Hollatz	Rıdvan Öncel	Melih Tunca

(colours: Turkish or homegrown players; foreign players)

== Competitions ==
=== Overview ===
Competition	First match	Last match	Starting round	Final position	Record							
Competition	First match	Last match	Starting round	Final position	Pld	W	D	L	PF	PA	PD	Win %
Basketball Super League	30 September 2023	12 June 2024	Round 1	Runners-up	39	31	0	8	3,378	3,159	+219	79.49
EuroLeague	5 October 2023	16 April 2024	Round 1	Play-in	35	17	0	18	2,992	2,979	+13	48.57
Turkish Basketball Cup	13 February 2024	18 February 2024	Quarterfinals	Runners-up	3	2	0	1	242	242	+0	66.67
Total					77	50	0	27	6,612	6,380	+232	64.94

Source: Competitions

=== Basketball Super League ===
==== League table ====
Pos	Team	Pld	W	L	PF	PA	PD	Pts	Qualification or relegation
1	Anadolu Efes	30	25	5	2613	2417	+196	55	Advance to playoffs
2	Fenerbahçe Beko (C)	30	25	5	2773	2308	+465	55	Advance to playoffs
3	Beşiktaş Emlakjet	30	21	9	2462	2236	+226	51	Advance to playoffs
4	Pınar Karşıyaka	30	21	9	2691	2531	+160	51	Advance to playoffs
5	Galatasaray Ekmas	30	16	14	2544	2479	+65	46	Advance to playoffs

Source: Basketbol Süper Ligi
(C) Champions

==== Results summary ====
Overall						Home					Away				
Pld	W	L	PF	PA	PD	W	L	PF	PA	PD	W	L	PF	PA	PD
30	25	5	2613	2417	+196	12	3	1327	1222	+105	13	2	1286	1195	+91

Source: bsl.org.tr

==== Results by round ====
Round	1	2	3	4	5	6	7	8	9	10	11	12	13	14	15	16	17	18	19	20	21	22	23	24	25	26	27	28	29	30
Ground	H	A	H	A	H	A	H	A	H	A	H	A	A	H	A	A	H	A	H	A	H	A	H	A	H	A	H	H	A	H
Result	W	W	W	W	L	W	W	W	W	W	W	L	W	W	W	W	W	L	W	W	W	W	W	W	W	W	W	L	W	L
Position	5	1	1	1	3	2	2	2	2	1	1	1	1	1	1	1	1	1	1	1	1	1	1	1	1	1	1	1	1	1

Source: TBF.org.tr
A = Away; H = Home; W = Win; L = Loss

==== Matches ====
Note: All times are TRT (UTC+3) as listed by Turkish Basketball Federation.

30 September 2023 1	Anadolu Efes	89–78	ONVO Büyükçekmece	Ataköy, Istanbul
18:00	Scoring by quarter: 25–26, 23–12, 24–21, 17–19
	Pts: Clyburn 16; Rebs: Žižić 7 Asts: Yılmaz 6 PIR: Clyburn, Žižić 16	Boxscore	Pts: Bruinsma, Reed 18; Rebs: Bruinsma 6 Asts: Pérez 10; PIR: Reed 22	Arena: Sinan Erdem Dome; Referees: Mehmet Şahin, Ziya Özorhon, Duhan Köyiçi

8 October 2023 2	Çağdaş Bodrumspor	75–87	Anadolu Efes	Menteşe, Muğla
15:30	Scoring by quarter: 21–18, 21–27, 22–19, 11–23
	Pts: Moore 16; Rebs: Moore 8 Asts: Artis 7 PIR: Moore 18	Boxscore	Pts: Beaubois 21; Rebs: Yılmaz 11; Asts: Thompson 11; PIR: Beaubois, Thompson 24	Arena: Menteşe Sports Hall; Referees: Kaan Büyükçil, Orhan Çağrı Hekimolğlu, Yiğit Gönültaş

14 October 2023 3	Anadolu Efes	101–85	Pınar Karşıyaka	Ataköy, Istanbul
20:30	Scoring by quarter: 20–19, 32–16, 28–30, 21–20
	Pts: Beaubois 28; Rebs: three players 4 Asts: Yılmaz 8 PIR: Beaubois 33	Boxscore	Pts: McCollum 26; Rebs: Brown, Martin 5 Asts: McCollum 5 PIR: McCollum 26	Arena: Sinan Erdem Dome; Referees: Ali Şakacı, Ahmet Tatlıcı, Batuhan Söylemezoğlu

22 October 2023 4	Bahçeşehir Koleji	80–87	Anadolu Efes	Istanbul
18:00	Scoring by quarter: 23–15, 13–31, 36–16, 8–25
	Pts: Boutsiele, Cavanaugh 19; Rebs: Boutsiele 10; Asts: Scrubb 7 PIR: Boutsiele 24	Boxscore	Pts: Jones 20; Rebs: Jones 13; Asts: Jones, Yılmaz 4 PIR: Jones 31	Arena: Ülker Sports Arena; Referees: Hüseyin Çelik, Mehmet Serdar Ünal, Polat Parlak

29 October 2023 5	Anadolu Efes	76–95	Galatasaray Nef	Ataköy, Istanbul
20:30	Scoring by quarter: 19–22, 16–23, 24–23, 17–27
	Pts: Jones 18; Rebs: Clyburn 8 Asts: Yılmaz 5 PIR: Yılmaz 23	Boxscore	Pts: Tuncer 16; Rebs: Yeboah 7 Asts: Walden 7 PIR: Yeboah 21	Arena: Sinan Erdem Dome; Referees: Ali Serkan Emlek, Erhan Gürsel, Tolga Edis

5 November 2023 6	Reeder Samsunspor	73–93	Anadolu Efes	Samsun
15:30	Scoring by quarter: 27–23, 8–20, 16–23, 22–27
	Pts: Levi 21; Rebs: Levi 5 Asts: Crawford 6 PIR: Levi 23	Boxscore	Pts: Žižić 22; Rebs: Žižić 17; Asts: Yılmaz 7 PIR: Žižić 35	Arena: Mustafa Dağıstanlı Sports Hall; Referees: Özlem Yalman, Fatih Güler, Göksun Öz

11 November 2023 7	Anadolu Efes	85–75	Tofaş	Ataköy, Istanbul
18:00	Scoring by quarter: 21–21, 26–18, 26–19, 12–17
	Pts: Beaubois 20; Rebs: Willis, Žižić 9 Asts: Thompson 9 PIR: Beaubois 25	Boxscore	Pts: Winston 18; Rebs: Demir 9 Asts: Winston 5 PIR: Demir 17	Arena: Sinan Erdem Dome; Referees: Mehmet Karabilecen, Ayşe Nur Yazıcıoğlu, Umut Özgün Ergün

19 November 2023 8	Yukatel Merkezefendi Basket	64–79	Anadolu Efes	Denizli
15:30	Scoring by quarter: 18–20, 22–15, 11–24, 13–20
	Pts: Oturu 28; Rebs: Oturu 11; Asts: Bleijenbergh 6 PIR: Oturu 25	Boxscore	Pts: Willis 22; Rebs: Clyburn 7 Asts: Thompson 9 PIR: Willis 28	Arena: Pamukkale University Arena; Referees: Kerem Baki, Can Mavisu, Tolga Akkuşoğlu

27 November 2023 9	Anadolu Efes	99–79	Manisa BB	Ataköy, Istanbul
19:00	Scoring by quarter: 25–22, 26–18, 25–16, 23–23
	Pts: Beaubois 13; Rebs: Osmani, Yıldızlı 6 Asts: Hollatz 6 PIR: Beaubois 18	Boxscore	Pts: Cruz, Duval 15; Rebs: Olmaz 9 Asts: Cruz 6 PIR: Cruz 19	Arena: Sinan Erdem Dome; Referees: Emin Moğulkoç, Sinem Tetik Akbayrak, Polat Parlak

3 December 2023 10	Petkim Spor	92–101(OT)	Anadolu Efes	Aliağa, İzmir
15:30	Scoring by quarter: 17–26, 18–25, 20–17, 2916, Overtime: 8–17
	Pts: Efianayi 18; Rebs: Aldridge 10; Asts: Thomas 6 PIR: Agva 22	Boxscore	Pts: Beaubois 27; Rebs: Yılmaz 9 Asts: Beaubois 6 PIR: Beaubois 31	Arena: Enka Sport Hall; Referees: Zafer Yılmaz, Mehmet Serdar Ünal, Kerem Yılmaz

11 December 2023 11	Anadolu Efes	81–80	Fenerbahçe Beko	Ataköy, Istanbul
19:00	Scoring by quarter: 24–21, 25–23, 20–15, 12–21
	Pts: Thompson 21; Rebs: Jones, Osmani 8 Asts: Larkin 10; PIR: Thompson 23	Boxscore	Pts: Wilbekin 18; Rebs: three players 6 Asts: Calathes 6 PIR: Wilbekin 19	Arena: Sinan Erdem Dome; Referees: Ali Serkan Emlek, Ali Şakacı, Alper Özgök

16 December 2023 12	Beşiktaş Emlakjet	85–77	Anadolu Efes	Istanbul
20:30	Scoring by quarter: 21–14, 28–22, 13–18, 23–23
	Pts: Needham 19; Rebs: Delgado 10; Asts: Mathews 4 PIR: Needham 23	Boxscore	Pts: Oturu 25; Rebs: Jones, Oturu 8 Asts: Larkin 9 PIR: Larkin 26	Arena: Akatlar Arena

24 December 2023 13	Türk Telekom	69–71	Anadolu Efes	Ankara
18:00	Scoring by quarter: 15–17, 18–24, 17–10, 19–20
	Pts: Wallace 21; Rebs: Saybir, Wallace 7 Asts: Palmer 4 PIR: Ulubay 17	Boxscore	Pts: Bryant; Rebs: Osmani, Oturu 9 Asts: Bryant 4 PIR: Bryant 18	Arena: Ankara Arena; Referees: Emin Moğulkoç, Batuhan Söylemezoğlu, Çağlar Özkan

30 December 2023 14	Anadolu Efes	85–78	Darüşşafaka Lassa	Ataköy, Istanbul
20:30	Scoring by quarter: 26–22, 17–17, 19–16, 23–23
	Pts: Beaubois 24; Rebs: three players 5 Asts: Beaubois 6 PIR: Beaubois 24	Boxscore	Pts: Demir 19; Rebs: Demir 6 Asts: Abdur-Rahkman 5 PIR: Korkmaz 18	Arena: Sinan Erdem Dome; Referees: Alper Altuğ Köselerli, Can Mavisu, Polat Parlak

7 January 2023 15	Bursaspor İnfo Yatırım	73–83	Anadolu Efes	Bursa
18:00	Scoring by quarter: 27–21, 14–20, 12–22, 20–20
	Pts: Floyd 14; Rebs: Floyd 8 Asts: Brown 6 PIR: Young 23	Boxscore	Pts: Oturu 30; Rebs: Oturu 11; Asts: Oturu 6 PIR: Oturu 39	Arena: Tofaş Spor Salonu; Referees: Zafer Yılmaz, Kaan Büyükçil, Musa Kazım Çetin

14 January 2023 16	ONVO Büyükçekmece	70–79	Anadolu Efes	Istanbul
20:30	Scoring by quarter: 16–21, 21–18, 23–18, 10–22
	Pts: Pérez 20; Rebs: Thomas 9 Asts: Pérez 7 PIR: Pérez 23	Boxscore	Pts: Oturu 17; Rebs: Daum 8 Asts: Bryant 5 PIR: Daum 24	Arena: Gazanfer Bilge Sports Hall; Referees: Kerem Baki, Murat Ciner, Kerem Yılmaz

21 January 2023 17	Anadolu Efes	87–79	Çağdaş Bodrumspor	Ataköy, Istanbul
15:30	Scoring by quarter: 18–19, 17–26, 26–14, 26–20
	Pts: Thompson 27; Rebs: Oturu 8 Asts: Thompson 6 PIR: Thompson 31	Boxscore	Pts: Alibegović 15; Rebs: Johnson 9 Asts: four players 4 PIR: Artis 19	Arena: Sinan Erdem Dome; Referees: Mehmet Karabilecen, Erhan Gürsel, Tolga Edis

28 January 2024 18	Pınar Karşıyaka	99–81	Anadolu Efes	İzmir
18:00	Scoring by quarter: 27–19, 30–16, 18–26, 19–17
	Pts: V.Brown 29; Rebs: Carey 8 Asts: McCollum 7 PIR: V.Brown 36	Boxscore	Pts: Willis 19; Rebs: Jones 8 Asts: Larkin 9 PIR: Willis 22	Arena: Karşıyaka Arena; Referees: Ali Serkan Emlek, Kaan Büyükçil, Umut Özgün Ergün

4 February 2024 19	Anadolu Efes	91–82	Bahçeşehir Koleji	Ataköy, Istanbul
18:00	Scoring by quarter: 22–20, 17–28, 27–14, 25–20
	Pts: Jones 22; Rebs: Osmani 7 Asts: Clyburn, Thompson 6 PIR: Jones 23	Boxscore	Pts: Cavanaugh 19; Rebs: Boutsiele 10; Asts: Scrubb 7 PIR: Cavanaugh 23	Arena: Sinan Erdem Dome; Referees: Yener Yılmaz, Musa Kazım Çetin, Nazlı Çisil Güngör

11 February 2024 20	Galatasaray Nef	92–95	Anadolu Efes	Ataköy, Istanbul
13:00	Scoring by quarter: 18–28, 23–20, 25–26, 26–21
	Pts: Prepelič 29; Rebs: Kabaca 7 Asts: Tuncer 6 PIR: Prepelič 29	Boxscore	Pts: Pleiß 22; Rebs: Bryant 14; Asts: Thompson 12; PIR: Bryant 27	Arena: Sinan Erdem Dome; Referees: Ali Şakacı, Seher Ayşe Nur Yazıcıoğlu, Yiğit Gönültaş

3 March 2024 21	Anadolu Efes	91–86	Reeder Samsunspor	Ataköy, Istanbul
15:30	Scoring by quarter: 21–19, 22–26, 17–25, 31–16
	Pts: Thompson 17; Rebs: Yılmaz 10; Asts: Hollatz 5 PIR: Hollatz 22	Boxscore	Pts: Henry 33; Rebs: Sezgün 9 Asts: Satır 8 PIR: Henry 30	Arena: Sinan Erdem Dome; Referees: Zafer Yılmaz, Orhan Çağrı Hekimoğlu, Berk Kurtulmuş

10 March 2024 22	Tofaş	93–95	Anadolu Efes	Bursa
15:30	Scoring by quarter: 17–23, 23–28, 31–16, 22–28
	Pts: Winston 24; Rebs: Wiley 13; Asts: Geçim, Winston 6 PIR: Winston 27	Boxscore	Pts: Beaubois 27; Rebs: Jones 9 Asts: Bryant 7 PIR: Beaubois 32	Arena: Tofaş Spor Salonu; Referees: Mehmet Şahin, Can Mavisu, İsmail Binbir

17 March 2024 23	Anadolu Efes	83–77	Yukatel Merkezefendi Basket	Ataköy, Istanbul
18:00	Scoring by quarter: 20–17, 23–22, 20–24, 20–14
	Pts: Oturu 22; Rebs: three players 7 Asts: Bryant 6 PIR: Bryant 34	Boxscore	Pts: Pecarski 23; Rebs: Floyd, Pecarski 8 Asts: Badžim, Mason 4 PIR: Pecarski 26	Arena: Sinan Erdem Dome; Referees: Mehmet Karabilecen, Fatih Arslanoğlu, Burak Yılmaz

24 March 2024 24	Manisa BB	76–81	Anadolu Efes	Manisa
15:30	Scoring by quarter: 22–19, 22–24, 18–18, 14–20
	Pts: Terry 19; Rebs: Terry 8 Asts: Cruz 10; PIR: Luther, Terry 19	Boxscore	Pts: Clyburn 22; Rebs: Clyburn 9 Asts: Clyburn, Thompson 6 PIR: Clyburn 29	Arena: Muradiye Sports Hall; Referees: Ali Serkan Emlek, Zafer Yılmaz, Umut Özgün Ergün

2 April 2024 25	Anadolu Efes	98–73	Petkim Spor	Ataköy, Istanbul
18:00	Scoring by quarter: 35–17, 22–14, 18–23, 23–19
	Pts: Beaubois, Oturu 23; Rebs: Oturu 8 Asts: Clyburn 8 PIR: Oturu 29	Boxscore	Pts: Efianayi 18; Rebs: Agva, Simmons 6 Asts: three players 4 PIR: Simmons 20	Arena: Sinan Erdem Dome; Referees: Özlem Yalman, Semih Vural, Berk Kurtulmuş

8 April 2024 26	Fenerbahçe Beko	80–90	Anadolu Efes	Istanbul
20:30	Scoring by quarter: 19–22, 21–20, 23–20, 17–28
	Pts: Biberović 19; Rebs: Biberović 6 Asts: Calathes, Gudurić 5 PIR: Gudurić 18	Boxscore	Pts: Larkin, Osmani 22; Rebs: three players 7 Asts: Clyburn, Larkin 5 PIR: Osmani 28	Arena: Ülker Sports Arena; Referees: Yener Yılmaz, Sinem Tetik Akbayrak, Duhan Köyiçi

14 April 2024 27	Anadolu Efes	90–75	Beşiktaş Emlakjet	Ataköy, Istanbul
20:30	Scoring by quarter: 32–25, 19–15, 17–18, 22–17
	Pts: Beaubois 16; Rebs: Yılmaz 7 Asts: Bryant 8 PIR: Bryant 22	Boxscore	Pts: Mitchell 15; Rebs: Delgado 10; Asts: Needham 6 PIR: Mitchell 15	Arena: Sinan Erdem Dome; Referees: Ali Serkan Emlek, Hüseyin Çelik, Tolga Akkuşoğlu

21 April 2024 28	Anadolu Efes	81–82	Türk Telekom	Ataköy, Istanbul
20:30	Scoring by quarter: 24–23, 23–16, 18–25, 16–18
		Boxscore		Arena: Sinan Erdem Dome; Referees: Emin Moğulkoç, Polat Parlak, Fatih Güler

29 April 2024 29	Darüşşafaka Lassa	74–87	Anadolu Efes	Istanbul
19:00	Scoring by quarter: 24–28, 15–20, 13–17, 22–22
	Pts: Abdur-Rahkman, Woodard 16; Rebs: Demir 9 Asts: Adams, Demir 2 PIR: Pandi 16	Boxscore	Pts: Larkin 27; Rebs: Clyburn 9 Asts: Larkin 5 PIR: Larkin 33	Arena: Ayhan Şahenk Sports Hall; Referees: Özlem Yalman, Alper Özgök, Burak Yılmaz

6 May 2024 30	Anadolu Efes	90–98	Bursaspor İnfo Yatırım	Ataköy, Istanbul
18:00	Scoring by quarter: 26–32, 18–16, 19–27, 27–23
	Pts: Jones 22; Rebs: Jones 12; Asts: Bryant 6 PIR: Jones 29	Boxscore	Pts: Neal 23; Rebs: Gavrilovic 12; Asts: Neal 7 PIR: Neal 28	Arena: Sinan Erdem Dome; Referees: Alper Altuğ Köselerli, Mehmet Serdar Ünal, Tolga Edis

==== Playoffs ====
===== Quarterfinals =====
Win Loss

15 May 2024 1	Anadolu Efes	99–79 (Series: 1–0)	Türk Telekom	Ataköy, Istanbul
18:00 TRT (UTC+3)	Scoring by quarter: 30–24, 23–17, 27–19, 19–19
	Pts: Larkin 21; Rebs: four players 7 Asts: Özdemiroğlu 5 PIR: Willis 25	Boxscore	Pts: Enoch, Palmer 19; Rebs: Enoch, Jones 6 Asts: Palmer, Wallace 5 PIR: Enoch 26	Arena: Sinan Erdem Dome; Referees: Mehmet Şahin, Ziya Özorhon, Murat Ciner

17 May 2024 2	Türk Telekom	78–86 (Series: 0–2)	Anadolu Efes	Ankara
18:00 TRT (UTC+3)	Scoring by quarter: 26–27, 18–25, 16–18, 18–16
	Pts: Saybir, Wallace 18; Rebs: Wallace 9 Asts: Palmer 5 PIR: Saybir 22	Boxscore	Pts: Clyburn 26; Rebs: Clyburn 10; Asts: Larkin 9 PIR: Clyburn 21	Arena: Ankara Arena; Referees: Zafer Yılmaz, Alper Özgök, Tolga Akkuşoğlu

===== Semifinals =====
Win Loss

29 May 2024 1	Anadolu Efes	103–80 (Series: 1–0)	Pınar Karşıyaka	Ataköy, Istanbul
20:30 TRT (UTC+3)	Scoring by quarter: 33–24, 23–31, 30–10, 17–15
	Pts: Larkin, Özdemiroğlu 25; Rebs: Willis 8 Asts: Larkin 9 PIR: Larkin 32	Boxscore	Pts: Sipahi 19; Rebs: Brown 6 Asts: McCollum 5 PIR: Sipahi 17	Arena: Sinan Erdem Dome; Referees: Kerem Baki, Hüseyin Çelik, Tolga Edis

31 May 2024 2	Anadolu Efes	82–68 (Series: 2–0)	Pınar Karşıyaka	Ataköy, Istanbul
20:30 TRT (UTC+3)	Scoring by quarter: 26–11, 18–27, 22–18, 16–12
	Pts: Oturu 22; Rebs: Osmani, Oturu 7 Asts: Larkin 10; PIR: Oturu 23	Boxscore	Pts: McCollum 24; Rebs: Brown 8 Asts: Sipahi 5 PIR: McCollum 25	Arena: Sinan Erdem Dome; Referees: Ali Serkan Emlek, Ziya Özorhon, Semih Vural

2 June 2024 3	Pınar Karşıyaka	90–97 (Series: 0–3)	Anadolu Efes	İzmir
20:30 TRT (UTC+3)	Scoring by quarter: 20–24, 22–24, 25–24, 23–25
		Boxscore		Arena: Karşıyaka Arena; Referees: Mehmet Karabilecen, Fatih Arslanoğlu, Alper Özgök

===== Finals =====
Win Loss

6 June 2024 1	Anadolu Efes	74–85 (Series: 0–1)	Fenerbahçe Beko	Ataköy, Istanbul
20:30 TRT (UTC+3)	Scoring by quarter: 16–22, 20–29, 15–20, 23–14
	Pts: Osmani 18; Rebs: Osmani 6 Asts: Larkin 8 PIR: Osmani 21	Boxscore	Pts: Hayes-Davis 28; Rebs: four players 5 Asts: Calathes 11; PIR: Hayes-Davis 26	Arena: Sinan Erdem Dome; Referees: Kerem Baki, Mehmet Şahin, Ziya Özorhon

8 June 2024 2	Anadolu Efes	70–101 (Series: 0–2)	Fenerbahçe Beko	Ataköy, Istanbul
20:30 TRT (UTC+3)	Scoring by quarter: 16–31, 22–22, 13–25, 19–23
	Pts: Oturu 21; Rebs: Bryant, Oturu 9 Asts: Bryant 4 PIR: Oturu 25	Boxscore	Pts: Wilbekin 24; Rebs: Papagiannis 8 Asts: Calathes 8 PIR: Wilbekin 25	Arena: Sinan Erdem Dome; Referees: Emin Moğulkoç, Altuğ Köselerli, Semih Vural

10 June 2024 3	Fenerbahçe Beko	81–82 (Series: 2–1)	Anadolu Efes	Istanbul
20:30 TRT (UTC+3)	Scoring by quarter: 16–13, 23–21, 17–22, 25–26
	Pts: Wilbekin 17; Rebs: Hayes-Davis 5 Asts: Calathes 12; PIR: Calathes 20	Boxscore	Pts: Willis 20; Rebs: Larkin 5 Asts: Larkin 7 PIR: Willis 26	Arena: Ülker Sports Arena; Referees: Yener Yılmaz, Özlem Yalman, Hüseyin Çelik

12 June 2024 4	Fenerbahçe Beko	80–72(OT) (Series: 3–1)	Anadolu Efes	Istanbul
20:30 TRT (UTC+3)	Scoring by quarter: 22–8, 14–25, 15–19, 13–12, Overtime: 16–8
	Pts: Biberović 19; Rebs: Papagiannis 9 Asts: Calathes 10; PIR: Biberović 19	Boxscore	Pts: Bryant 20; Rebs: Oturu 7 Asts: Bryant, Larkin 4 PIR: Bryant 19	Arena: Ülker Sports Arena; Referees: Emin Moğulkoç, Kerem Baki, Can Mavisu

=== EuroLeague ===
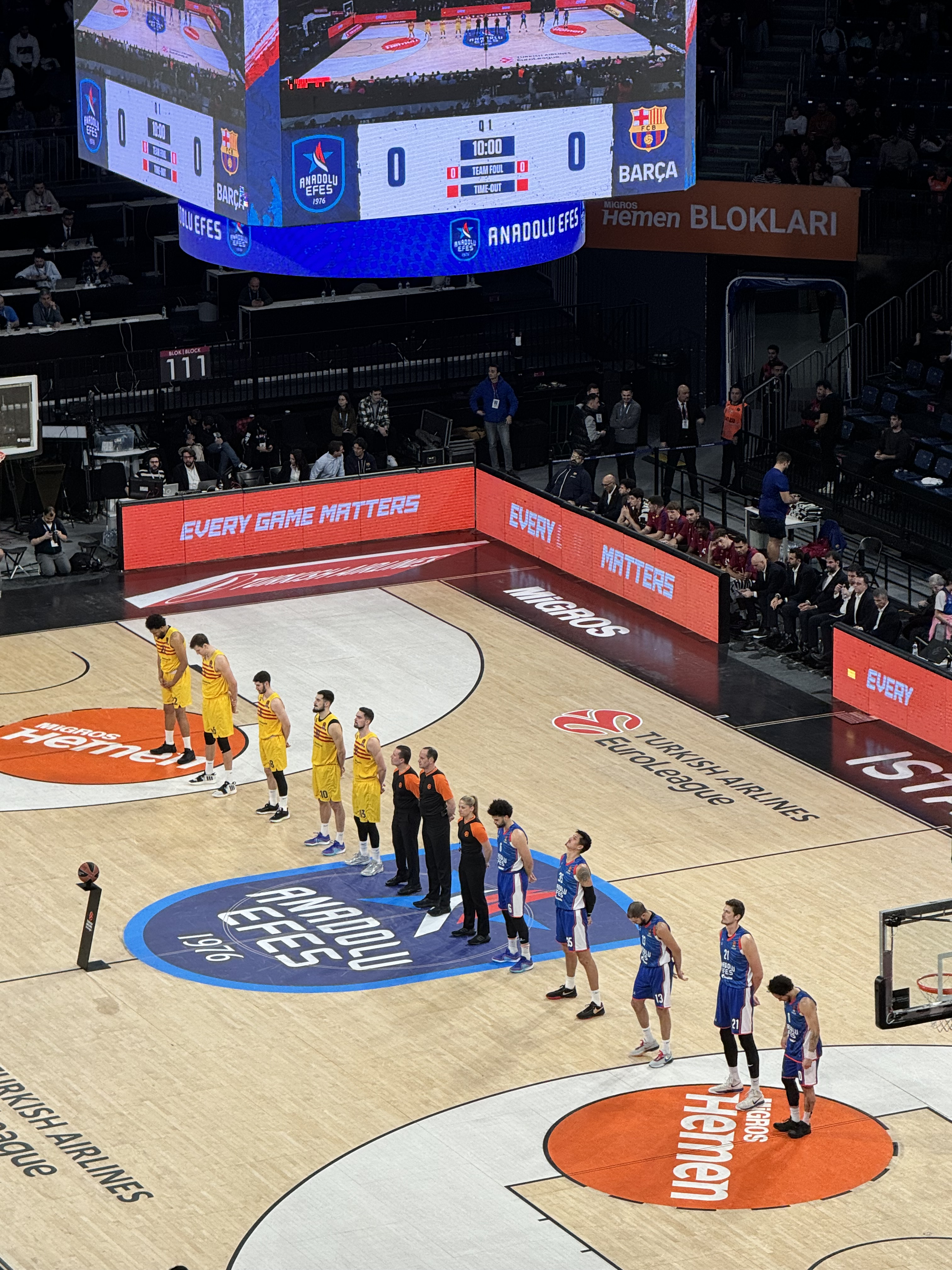
Anadolu Efes v Barcelona, 18 January 2024

==== League table ====
Pos	Team	Pld	W	L	PF	PA	PD	Qualification
7	(Israeli Basketball Association) Maccabi Playtika Tel Aviv	34	20	14	2969	2939	+30	Qualification to play-in
8	(Spanish Basketball Federation) Baskonia	34	18	16	2849	2867	−18	Qualification to play-in
9	(Turkish Basketball Federation) Anadolu Efes	34	17	17	2871	2855	+16	Qualification to play-in
10	(Italian Basketball Federation) Virtus Segafredo Bologna	34	17	17	2728	2804	−76	Qualification to play-in
11	(Basketball Federation of Serbia) Partizan Mozzart Bet	34	16	18	2782	2802	−20	

Source: EuroLeague
Rules for classification: All points scored in extra period(s) were not counted in the standings, nor for any tie-break situation.

==== Results summary ====
Overall						Home					Away				
Pld	W	L	PF	PA	PD	W	L	PF	PA	PD	W	L	PF	PA	PD
34	17	17	2928	2912	+16	13	4	1505	1370	+135	4	13	1423	1542	−119

Last updated: complete.
Source: EuroLeague

==== Results by round ====
Round	1	2	3	4	5	6	7	8	9	10	11	12	13	14	15	16	17	18	19	20	21	22	23	24	25	26	27	28	29	30	31	32	33	34
Ground	A	H	H	H	A	A	H	A	A	H	A	H	A	H	A	H	H	A	A	A	H	H	H	A	H	A	A	H	A	H	H	A	A	H
Result	L	L	W	W	L	L	W	W	L	W	L	W	W	L	L	L	L	L	L	L	W	W	L	L	W	W	L	W	L	W	W	W	W	W
Position	17	17	16	11	13	15	13	11	13	11	14	13	10	12	13	13	14	15	15	16	15	15	14	16	16	14	15	13	14	13	13	10	10	9

Source: EuroLeague.net
A = Away; H = Home; W = Win; L = Loss

==== Matches ====
Note: All times, from 29 October 2023 to 31 March 2024, are CET (UTC+1); up to 29 October 2023 and from 31 March 2024, are CEST (UTC+2) as listed by EuroLeague.

5 October 2023 1	Barcelona (Spanish Basketball Federation)	91–74	(Turkish Basketball Federation) Anadolu Efes	Barcelona
20:30 (CEST)	Scoring by quarter: 22–19, 18–15, 29–30, 22–10
	Pts: Hernangómez 18; Rebs: Veselý 7 Asts: Laprovíttola 8 PIR: Hernangómez 24	Boxscore	Pts: Larkin 16; Rebs: Willis 6 Asts: Larkin 12; PIR: Larkin 26	Arena: Palau Blaugrana; Attendance: 5,577; Referees: Sreten Radović, Mehdi Difallah, Milivoje Jovčić

12 October 2023 2	Anadolu Efes (Turkish Basketball Federation)	80–103	(Spanish Basketball Federation) Real Madrid	Istanbul
19:30 (CEST)	Scoring by quarter: 24–26, 17–29, 19–25, 20–23
	Pts: Thompson 20; Rebs: Žižić, Thompson 7 Asts: Thompson 5 PIR: Thompson 23	Boxscore	Pts: Yabusele 22; Rebs: Yabusele, Hezonja 8 Asts: Campazzo 10; PIR: Yabusele 39	Arena: Sinan Erdem Dome; Attendance: 15,012; Referees: Matej Boltauzer, Uroš Nikolić, Joseph Bissang

17 October 2023 3	Anadolu Efes (Turkish Basketball Federation)	89–84	(French Federation of Basketball) LDLC ASVEL	Istanbul
19:30 (CEST)	Scoring by quarter: 24–24, 19–11, 27–21, 19–28
	Pts: Clyburn 19; Rebs: Larkin, Clyburn 6 Asts: Larkin 6 PIR: Larkin 23	Boxscore	Pts: de Colo 25; Rebs: Ndiaye 8 Asts: Lee 5 PIR: de Colo 27	Arena: Sinan Erdem Dome; Attendance: 7,816; Referees: Emilio Pérez, Sašo Petek, Kristaps Konstantinovs

20 October 2023 4	Anadolu Efes (Turkish Basketball Federation)	77–73	(Spanish Basketball Federation) Valencia Basket	Istanbul
19:30 (CEST)	Scoring by quarter: 18–15, 20–25, 19–13, 20–20
	Pts: Larkin 15; Rebs: Larkin 8 Asts: Larkin 6 PIR: Larkin 26	Boxscore	Pts: Inglis 13; Rebs: Jones 8 Asts: Jones 4 PIR: Inglis 15	Arena: Sinan Erdem Dome; Attendance: 11,892; Referees: Fernando Rocha, Oļegs Latiševs, Thomas Bissuel

26 October 2023 5	Olympiacos (Hellenic Basketball Federation)	75–57	(Turkish Basketball Federation) Anadolu Efes	Piraeus
21:00	Scoring by quarter: 17–14, 16–11, 28–18, 14–14
	Pts: Papanikolaou, Williams-Goss 14; Rebs: three players 7 Asts: Walkup 6 PIR: Williams-Goss 20	Boxscore	Pts: Bryant 10; Rebs: Clyburn 9 Asts: Larkin 5 PIR: Bryant, Larkin 10	Arena: Peace and Friendship Stadium; Attendance: 12,197; Referees: Juan Carlos García, Mehdi Difallah, Miloš Koljenšić

3 November 2023 6	Virtus Segafredo Bologna (Italian Basketball Federation)	93–81	(Turkish Basketball Federation) Anadolu Efes	Bologna
20:30	Scoring by quarter: 20–18, 21–27, 28–17, 24–19
	Pts: Shengelia 19; Rebs: Dunston 6 Asts: Shengelia 6 PIR: Shengelia 30	Boxscore	Pts: Beaubois 17; Rebs: Willis 7 Asts: Beaubois 3 PIR: Beaubois 22	Arena: Segafredo Arena; Referees: Miguel Ángel Pérez, Saulius Račys, Dragan Porobić

9 November 2023 7	Anadolu Efes (Turkish Basketball Federation)	86–82(OT)	(Lithuanian Basketball Federation) Žalgiris	Istanbul
18:30 (CEST)	Scoring by quarter: 13–14, 25–12, 13–20, 23–28, Overtime: 12–8
	Pts: Clyburn 20; Rebs: Willis 10; Asts: Thompson, Larkin 5 PIR: Clyburn 28	Boxscore	Pts: Evans 20; Rebs: Šmits 7 Asts: Ulanovas 6 PIR: Hayes 22	Arena: Sinan Erdem Dome; Attendance: 10,938; Referees: Emilio Pérez, Carlos Cortés, Marko Juras

14 November 2023 8	AS Monaco Basket (French Federation of Basketball)	82–89	(Turkish Basketball Federation) Anadolu Efes	Fontvieille, Monaco
19:00	Scoring by quarter: 25–28, 19–20, 22–21, 16–20
	Pts: Loyd 19; Rebs: Brown 8 Asts: James 4 PIR: Brown 23	Boxscore	Pts: Larkin 25; Rebs: Clyburn 6 Asts: three players 5 PIR: Larkin 25	Arena: Salle Gaston Médecin; Attendance: 3,911; Referees: Saša Pukl, Luka Kardum, Eduard Udyanskyy

16 November 2023 9	EA7 Emporio Armani Milan (Italian Basketball Federation)	92–76	(Turkish Basketball Federation) Anadolu Efes	Milan
20:30	Scoring by quarter: 19–18, 24–21, 20–22, 29–15
	Pts: Shields 18; Rebs: Melli 10; Asts: Voigtmann 6 PIR: Melli 24	Boxscore	Pts: Clyburn 18; Rebs: Clyburn 7 Asts: Larkin 7 PIR: Clyburn 25	Arena: Mediolanum Forum; Attendance: 7,971; Referees: Sreten Radović, Uroš Nikolić, Robert Vyklický

24 November 2023 10	Anadolu Efes (Turkish Basketball Federation)	100–94	(Basketball Federation of Serbia) Partizan Mozzart Bet	Istanbul
18:30 (CEST)	Scoring by quarter: 22-22, 28-23, 14-29, 36-20
	Pts: Larkin 27; Rebs: three players 3 Asts: Larkin 8 PIR: Larkin 38	Boxscore	Pts: Kaminsky 24; Rebs: Nunnally 8 Asts: Dozier, Jaramaz 5 PIR: Nunnally 23	Arena: Sinan Erdem Dome; Attendance: 10,018; Referees: Miguel Ángel Pérez, Joseph Bissang, Igor Dragojević

1 December 2023 11	Crvena zvezda Meridianbet (Basketball Federation of Serbia)	97–83	(Turkish Basketball Federation) Anadolu Efes	Belgrade
20:00	Scoring by quarter: 22–21, 21–28, 29–21, 25–13
	Pts: Nedović 23; Rebs: Mitrović 7 Asts: dos Santos 5 PIR: dos Santos 28	Boxscore	Pts: Larkin 21; Rebs: Jones 10; Asts: Larkin 5 PIR: Larkin 19	Arena: Aleksandar Nikolić Hall; Attendance: 18,290; Referees: Carmelo Paternicò, Carlos Cortés, Alberto Baena

5 December 2023 12	Anadolu Efes (Turkish Basketball Federation)	71–68	(Hellenic Basketball Federation) Panathinaikos AKTOR	Istanbul
18:30	Scoring by quarter: 23–15, 14–16, 13–21, 21–16
	Pts: Jones 21; Rebs: Jones 13; Asts: Thompson 6 PIR: Jones 36	Boxscore	Pts: Lessort, Nunn 13; Rebs: Mitoglou, Nunn 5 Asts: Sloukas 8 PIR: Grant, Lessort 15	Arena: Sinan Erdem Dome; Attendance: 14,016; Referees: Sreten Radović, Carlos Peruga, Rain Peerandi

7 December 2023 13	ALBA Berlin (German Basketball Federation)	89–97	(Turkish Basketball Federation) Anadolu Efes	Berlin
20:00	Scoring by quarter: 15–22, 25–15, 25–27, 24–33
	Pts: Thiemann 31; Rebs: Schneider 7 Asts: Spagnolo 5 PIR: Thiemann 40	Boxscore	Pts: Larkin 32; Rebs: Osmani 6 Asts: Hollatz, Thompson 8 PIR: Larkin 41	Arena: Mercedes-Benz Arena; Referees: Juan Carlos García, Jurgis Laurinavičius, Leandro Lezcano

14 December 2023 14	Maccabi Playtika Tel Aviv (Israeli Basketball Association)	95–86	(Turkish Basketball Federation) Anadolu Efes	Belgrade (Note: From 24 October onwards, Maccabi Playtika Tel Aviv will play their home matches at the Aleksandar Nikolić Hall in Belgrade due to the inability to host matches in Israel as a result of the Gaza war.)
18:30	Scoring by quarter: 29–20, 16–28, 21–16, 29–22
	Pts: Brown 21; Rebs: Nebo 9 Asts: Blatt 6 PIR: Colson 26	Boxscore	Pts: Thompson 22; Rebs: Jones 16; Asts: Thompson 7 PIR: Thompson 26	Arena: Aleksandar Nikolić Hall; Attendance: 0 Referees: Miguel Ángel Pérez, Tomasz Trawicki, Uroš Obrknežević

20 December 2023 15	Bayern Munich (German Basketball Federation)	86–71	(Turkish Basketball Federation) Anadolu Efes	Munich
20:30	Scoring by quarter: 20–17, 30–24, 21–18, 15–12
	Pts: Obst 17; Rebs: Ibaka 7 Asts: Francisco 6 PIR: Bonga 24	Boxscore	Pts: Oturu 19; Rebs: Oturu 8 Asts: Larkin 6 PIR: Oturu 30	Arena: BMW Park; Attendance: 6,500 (av.); Referees: Mehdi Difallah, Carlos Cortés, Michele Rossi

22 December 2023 16	Anadolu Efes (Turkish Basketball Federation)	80–87	(Spanish Basketball Federation) Baskonia	Istanbul
18:30	Scoring by quarter: 17–17, 19–19, 24–21, 20–30
	Pts: Larkin 23; Rebs: Bryant, Oturu 7 Asts: Larkin 5 PIR: Larkin 25	Boxscore	Pts: Howard 28; Rebs: Miller-McIntyre, Moneke 9 Asts: Miller-McIntyre 10; PIR: Miller-McIntyre 26	Arena: Sinan Erdem Dome; Attendance: 11,406; Referees: Ilija Belošević, Rain Peerandi, Thomas Bissuel

28 December 2023 17	Anadolu Efes (Turkish Basketball Federation)	84–89	(Turkish Basketball Federation) Fenerbahçe Beko	Istanbul
18:30	Scoring by quarter: 29–29, 23–18, 16–22, 16–20
	Pts: Larkin 28; Rebs: Oturu 7 Asts: Larkin 5 PIR: Larkin 37	Boxscore	Pts: Hayes 24; Rebs: Hayes 6 Asts: Calathes 8 PIR: Hayes 27	Arena: Sinan Erdem Dome; Attendance: 15,041; Referees: Sreten Radović, Uroš Nikolić, Sašo Petek

3 January 2024 18	Valencia Basket (Spanish Basketball Federation)	93–88	(Turkish Basketball Federation) Anadolu Efes	Valencia
20:30	Scoring by quarter: 18–18, 25–27, 28–21, 22–22
	Pts: Davies, Jones 15; Rebs: Inglis 10; Asts: Jones 6 PIR: Inglis 28	Boxscore	Pts: Larkin 20; Rebs: Pleiß 10; Asts: Beaubois 7 PIR: Larkin 20	Arena: Font de Sant Lluís; Attendance: 20,012; Referees: Miguel Ángel Pérez, Ioannis Foufis, Gytis Vilius

5 January 2024 19	Real Madrid (Spanish Basketball Federation)	130–126(OT)	(Turkish Basketball Federation) Anadolu Efes	Madrid
20:45	Scoring by quarter: 25–18, 13–18, 26–25, 17–20, Overtime: 10–10, 11–11, 9–9, 19–15
	Pts: Musa 40; Rebs: Hezonja, Tavares 12; Asts: Campazzo 11; PIR: Musa 45	Boxscore	Pts: Larkin 32; Rebs: Pleiß 11; Asts: Larkin 9 PIR: Larkin 33	Arena: WiZink Center; Attendance: 8,221; Referees: Matej Boltauzer, Robert Vyklický, Sérgio Silva

9 January 2024 20	Panathinaikos AKTOR (Hellenic Basketball Federation)	83–76	(Turkish Basketball Federation) Anadolu Efes	Marousi, Athens
20:15	Scoring by quarter: 25–14, 26–21, 17–22, 15–19
	Pts: Grigonis 24; Rebs: Mitoglou 7 Asts: Sloukas 9 PIR: Grigonis 28	Boxscore	Pts: Beaubois 16; Rebs: Pleiß 11; Asts: Thompson 5 PIR: Bryant 23	Arena: O.A.K.A. Attendance: 15,422; Referees: Ilija Belošević, Carlos Peruga, Gytis Vilius

12 January 2024 21	Anadolu Efes (Turkish Basketball Federation)	99–75	(Italian Basketball Federation) Virtus Segafredo Bologna	Istanbul
18:30	Scoring by quarter: 26–15, 24–14, 23–25, 26–21
	Pts: Thompson 26; Rebs: Jones 10; Asts: Bryant 3 PIR: Thompson 31	Boxscore	Pts: Lundberg 14; Rebs: Cordinier 6 Asts: three players 3 PIR: Mickey 19	Arena: Sinan Erdem Dome; Attendance: 8,904; Referees: Mehdi Difallah, Milan Nedović, Carlos Cortés

18 January 2024 22	Anadolu Efes (Turkish Basketball Federation)	98–74	(Spanish Basketball Federation) Barcelona	Istanbul
18:30	Scoring by quarter: 18–13, 24–26, 30–21, 26–14
	Pts: Beaubois 21; Rebs: Pleiß, Willis 7 Asts: Larkin 8 PIR: Larkin 23	Boxscore	Pts: Hernangómez 18; Rebs: Parker 6 Asts: Satoranský, Jokubaitis 5 PIR: Hernangómez 15	Arena: Sinan Erdem Dome; Attendance: 15,124; Referees: Tomislav Hordov, Ioannis Foufis, Vasiliki Tsaroucha

26 January 2024 23	Anadolu Efes (Turkish Basketball Federation)	78–80	(French Federation of Basketball) AS Monaco	Istanbul
18:30	Scoring by quarter: 23–22, 20–17, 17–26, 18–15
	Pts: Beaubois 15; Rebs: Oturu, Pleiß 6 Asts: Larkin 5 PIR: Larkin 19	Boxscore	Pts: Okobo, James 16; Rebs: Diallo 9 Asts: Okobo, Diallo 3 PIR: Okobo 17	Arena: Sinan Erdem Dome; Attendance: 14,842; Referees: Juan Carlos García, Fernando Rocha, Nick van den Broeck

31 January 2024 24	Žalgiris (Lithuanian Basketball Federation)	96–70	(Turkish Basketball Federation) Anadolu Efes	Kaunas
19:00	Scoring by quarter: 34–14, 24–23, 18–22, 20–11
	Pts: Birutis 18; Rebs: Hayes 9 Asts: Dimša 7 PIR: Birutis 27	Boxscore	Pts: Clyburn 19; Rebs: Pleiß 6 Asts: Clyburn 4 PIR: Clyburn 23	Arena: Žalgiris Arena; Attendance: 14,653; Referees: Carlos Peruga, Miloš Koljenšić, Eduard Udyanskyy

2 February 2024 25	Anadolu Efes (Turkish Basketball Federation)	79–73	(Italian Basketball Federation) EA7 Emporio Armani Milan	Istanbul
18:30	Scoring by quarter: 15–15, 19–28, 30–7, 15–23
	Pts: Larkin 19; Rebs: Willis 8 Asts: Larkin 6 PIR: Larkin 24	Boxscore	Pts: Shields 17; Rebs: Shields, Melli 7 Asts: Napier 7 PIR: Shields 20	Arena: Sinan Erdem Dome; Attendance: 12,074; Referees: Miguel Ángel Pérez, Luka Kardum, Alberto Baena

8 February 2024 26	Anadolu Efes (Turkish Basketball Federation)	105–91	(Israeli Basketball Association) Maccabi Playtika Tel Aviv	Riga (Note: The match, originally to be played at Sinan Erdem Dome in Istanbul, was relocated to Latvia on recommendation of both Turkish and Israeli governments regarding the Gaza war.)
20:05	Scoring by quarter: 29–27, 21–24, 27–24, 28–16
	Pts: Larkin 22; Rebs: three players 7 Asts: Larkin 6 PIR: Larkin 32	Boxscore	Pts: Baldwin 26; Rebs: Nebo 7 Asts: Blatt 9 PIR: Baldwin 32	Arena: Arena Riga; Attendance: 7,493; Referees: Emilio Pérez, Oļegs Latiševs, Hugues Thépénier

29 February 2024 27	Partizan Mozzart Bet (Basketball Federation of Serbia)	100–90	(Turkish Basketball Federation) Anadolu Efes	Belgrade
20:30	Scoring by quarter: 17–20, 26–20, 21–19, 36–31
	Pts: Avramović 30; Rebs: LeDay 8 Asts: Ponitka 4 PIR: Avramović 32	Boxscore	Pts: Clyburn 17; Rebs: Larkin 5 Asts: Larkin 6 PIR: Clyburn, Larkin 21	Arena: Štark Arena; Attendance: 20,200; Referees: Mehdi Difallah, Gytis Vilius, Kristaps Konstantinovs

7 March 2024 28	Anadolu Efes (Turkish Basketball Federation)	109–86	(German Basketball Federation) Bayern Munich	Istanbul
18:30	Scoring by quarter: 26–28, 27–21, 35–16, 21–21
	Pts: Larkin 28; Rebs: Jones, Willis 5 Asts: Bryant, Larkin 4 PIR: Larkin 33	Boxscore	Pts: Edwards 19; Rebs: Ibaka 6 Asts: Bolmaro, Lučić 4 PIR: Ibaka 23	Arena: Sinan Erdem Dome; Attendance: 14,671; Referees: Matej Boltauzer, Rain Peerandi, Marcin Kowalski

15 March 2024 29	LDLC ASVEL (French Federation of Basketball)	84–80	(Turkish Basketball Federation) Anadolu Efes	Villeurbanne, Lyon
20:00	Scoring by quarter: 19–16, 27–23, 19–13, 19–28
	Pts: Luwawu-Cabarrot 21; Rebs: Luwawu-Cabarrot 6 Asts: de Colo 9 PIR: Thomas 27	Boxscore	Pts: Clyburn 16; Rebs: Clyburn, Jones 5 Asts: Larkin 4 PIR: Larkin 19	Arena: Astroballe; Attendance: 8,566; Referees: Juan Carlos Garcia, Sasa Pukl, Seffi Shemmesh

19 March 2024 30	Anadolu Efes (Turkish Basketball Federation)	85–72	(Hellenic Basketball Federation) Olympiacos	Istanbul
18:30	Scoring by quarter: 26–21, 22–16, 18–24, 19–11
	Pts: Larkin 15; Rebs: Oturu 5 Asts: Larkin 6 PIR: Bryant 17	Boxscore	Pts: Peters 19; Rebs: Peters, Papanikolaou 5 Asts: Walkup 10; PIR: Papanikolaou 20	Arena: Sinan Erdem Dome; Attendance: 14,367; Referees: Ilija Belošević, Milan Nedović, Alberto Baena

21 March 2024 31	Anadolu Efes (Turkish Basketball Federation)	85–84	(German Basketball Federation) ALBA Berlin	Istanbul
18:30	Scoring by quarter: 23–23, 30–17, 12–27, 20–17
	Pts: Bryant 24; Rebs: Bryant 5 Asts: Hollatz, Bryant 4 PIR: Bryant 33	Boxscore	Pts: Olinde, Thomas 17; Rebs: Koumadje 10; Asts: Hermannsson 7 PIR: Olinde 16	Arena: Sinan Erdem Dome; Attendance: 10,057; Referees: Oļegs Latiševs, Sérgio Silva, Vasiliki Tsaroucha

28 March 2024 32	Baskonia (Spanish Basketball Federation)	76–97	(Turkish Basketball Federation) Anadolu Efes	Vitoria-Gasteiz
20:30	Scoring by quarter: 22–32, 23–17, 8–28, 23–20
	Pts: Howard 15; Rebs: Moneke 7 Asts: Chiozza 5 PIR: Kotsar, Moneke 11	Boxscore	Pts: Larkin 28; Rebs: Hollatz 6 Asts: Bryant 4 PIR: Larkin 29	Arena: Buesa Arena; Attendance: 10,816; Referees: Sreten Radović, Uroš Nikolić, Sašo Petek

5 April 2024 33	Fenerbahçe Beko (Turkish Basketball Federation)	80–82	(Turkish Basketball Federation) Anadolu Efes	Istanbul
19:45	Scoring by quarter: 13–16, 23–16, 16–19, 28–31
	Pts: Wilbekin 17; Rebs: Hayes-Davis, Papagiannis 8 Asts: Calathes, Wilbekin 3 PIR: Gudurić, Papagiannis 15	Boxscore	Pts: Clyburn 21; Rebs: Clyburn 5 Asts: Larkin 5 PIR: Clyburn 28	Arena: Ülker Sports and Event Hall; Attendance: 12,417; Referees: Ilija Belosevic Jordi Aliaga Arturas Sukys

11 April 2024 34	Anadolu Efes (Turkish Basketball Federation)	100–55	(Basketball Federation of Serbia) Crvena zvezda Meridianbet	Istanbul
19:30	Scoring by quarter: 15–11, 30–20, 31–13, 24–11
	Pts: Bryant 26; Rebs: Osmani 7 Asts: Larkin 7 PIR: Bryant, Oturu 24	Boxscore	Pts: three players 11; Rebs: Bolomboy 8 Asts: Teodosić 4 PIR: Mitrović 20	Arena: Sinan Erdem Dome; Attendance: 14,859; Referees: Juan Carlos Garcia, Piotr Pastusiak, Hugues Thepenier

==== Play-in ====
16 April 2024 Play-in	Anadolu Efes (Turkish Basketball Federation)	64–67	(Italian Basketball Federation) Virtus Segafredo Bologna	Istanbul
20:00	Scoring by quarter: 23–21, 13–14, 14–13, 14–19
	Pts: Clyburn 22; Rebs: Jones 7 Asts: Hollatz, Larkin 2 PIR: Clyburn 19	Boxscore	Pts: Shengelia 13; Rebs: Lundberg 7 Asts: Lundberg 7 PIR: Lundberg 16	Arena: Sinan Erdem Dome; Attendance: 14,967; Referees: Sreten Radovic, Carlos Peruga, Uros Nikolic

=== Turkish Basketball Cup ===
==== Quarterfinals ====
Win Loss

13 February 2024 QF	Anadolu Efes	94–85	Manisa BB	Ataköy, Istanbul
18:00	Scoring by quarter: 18–27, 33–20, 21–21, 22–17
TRT Spor	Pts: Larkin 23; Rebs: Clyburn 7 Asts: Larkin 10; PIR: Larkin 30	Boxscore	Pts: Terry 23; Rebs: Terry 13; Asts: Cruz 7 PIR: Terry 34	Arena: Sinan Erdem Dome; Referees: Mehmet Şahin, Mehmet Serdar Ünal, Burak Yılmaz

==== Semifinals ====
Win Loss

16 February 2024 SF	Anadolu Efes	81–77	Pınar Karşıyaka	Konya
18:00	Scoring by quarter: 23–16, 13–14, 21–26, 24–21
TRT Spor	Pts: Larkin 23; Rebs: Pleiß 10; Asts: Clyburn, Larkin 5 PIR: Larkin 27	Boxscore	Pts: McCollum 20; Rebs: Carey 11; Asts: McCollum 8 PIR: Carey 26	Arena: Karatay Spor ve Kongre Merkezi; Referees: Fatih Arslanoğlu, Alper Özgök, Musa Kazım Çetin

==== Final ====
Win Loss

18 February 2024 F	Anadolu Efes	67–80	Fenerbahçe Beko	Konya
15:30	Scoring by quarter: 20–26, 15–16, 14–21, 18–17
TRT Spor	Pts: Larkin 17; Rebs: Clyburn 7 Asts: Larkin 6 PIR: Larkin 21	Boxscore	Pts: Wilbekin 18; Rebs: Calathes 11; Asts: Calathes 7 PIR: Calathes 21	Arena: Karatay Spor ve Kongre Merkezi; Referees: Emin Moğulkoç, Yener Yılmaz, Mehmet Karabilecen
