= 2023–24 Basketbol Süper Ligi =

Basketball league in Turkey

Basketbol Süper Ligi
- Season: 2023–24
- Dates: 29 September 2023 – 12 June 2024
- Games played: 240 + Playoffs
- Teams: 16
- TV partner: beIN Sports

Regular season
- Season MVP: (United States) Austin Wiley
- Relegated: Çağdaş Bodrumspor; Reeder Samsunspor

Finals
- Champions: Fenerbahçe Beko (11th title)
- Runners-up: Anadolu Efes
- Semifinalists: Beşiktaş Emlakjet; Pınar Karşıyaka
- Finals MVP: (United States) Nigel Hayes-Davis

Statistical leaders
| Points | (United States) Marcquise Reed | 21.1 |
| Rebounds | (United States) Austin Wiley | 10.1 |
| Assists | (United States) Nate Mason | 7.1 |
| Index Rating | (United States) Austin Wiley | 22.8 |

Records
- Biggest home win: Beşiktaş Emlakjet 111–55 Reeder Samsunspor (3 May 2024)
- Biggest away win: Darüşşafaka Lassa 56–98 Fenerbahçe Beko (25 December 2023)
- Highest scoring: Bursaspor İnfo Yatırım 112–116 Fenerbahçe Beko (11 May 2024)
- Winning streak: 14 games Fenerbahçe Beko
- Losing streak: 14 games Reeder Samsunspor

The 2023–24 Basketbol Süper Ligi was the 58th season of the Basketball Super League (Turkish: Basketbol Süper Ligi), the top-level professional club men's basketball league in Turkey.

== Teams ==
On 7 May 2023, Çağdaş Bodrumspor was promoted to the BSL as the champion of the Turkish Basketball First League. It will be their first season in the BSL. Samsunspor promoted to the BSL as winners of the TBL play-offs.

AYOS Konyaspor and Gaziantep Basketbol were relegated after finishing in the last two spots for 2022–23 Basketbol Süper Ligi.

=== Venues ===
Locations of the 2023–24 Basketbol Süper Ligi clubs
Istanbul Basketbol Süper Ligi clubs

| Team | Home city | Stadium | Capacity |
|---|---|---|---|
| Anadolu Efes | Istanbul | Sinan Erdem Dome | 16,000 |
| Bahçeşehir Koleji | Istanbul | Ülker Sports Arena | 13,800 |
| Beşiktaş Emlakjet | Istanbul | Akatlar Arena | 3,200 |
| Bursaspor İnfo Yatırım | Bursa | Tofaş Nilüfer Sports Hall | 7,500 |
| Çağdaş Bodrumspor | Muğla | Bodrum Spor Salonu | 1,000 |
| Darüşşafaka Lassa | Istanbul | Volkswagen Arena Istanbul | 5,000 |
| Fenerbahçe Beko | Istanbul | Ülker Sports Arena | 13,800 |
| Galatasaray Ekmas | Istanbul | Sinan Erdem Dome | 16,000 |
| Manisa BB | Manisa | Muradiye Spor Salonu | 3,500 |
| ONVO Büyükçekmece | Istanbul | Gazanfer Bilge Spor Salonu | 3,000 |
| Petkim Spor | İzmir | Aliağa Belediyesi ENKA Spor Salonu | 3,000 |
| Pınar Karşıyaka | İzmir | Karşıyaka Arena | 5,000 |
| Reeder Samsunspor | Samsun | Mustafa Dağıstanlı Spor Salonu | 2,000 |
| Tofaş | Bursa | Tofaş Nilüfer Sports Hall | 7,500 |
| Türk Telekom | Ankara | Ankara Arena | 10,400 |
| Yukatel Merkezefendi Basket | Denizli | Pamukkale University Arena | 3,490 |

=== Personnel and sponsorship ===
| Team | Head coach | Captain | Kit manufacturer | Main shirt sponsor |
|---|---|---|---|---|
| Anadolu Efes | (Croatia) Tomislav Mijatović | (Turkey) Shane Larkin | Bilcee | Coca-Cola |
| Bahçeşehir Koleji | (Montenegro) Dejan Radonjić | (Turkey) Hadi Özdemir | Playoff | Bahçeşehir Koleji |
| Beşiktaş Emlakjet | (Serbia) Dušan Alimpijević | (Turkey) Yiğit Arslan | Umbro | Emlakjet |
| Bursaspor İnfo Yatırım | (Turkey) Serhan Kavut | (Turkey) Metin Türen | Kappa | İnfo Yatırım |
| Çağdaş Bodrumspor | (Turkey) Ahmet Çakı | (Turkey) Erkan Veyseloğlu | S by Sportive | Çağdaş Holding |
| Darüşşafaka Lassa | (Turkey) Rüçhan Tamsöz | (Turkey) Can Korkmaz | S by Sportive | Lassa |
| Fenerbahçe Beko | (Lithuania) Šarūnas Jasikevičius | (Turkey) Melih Mahmutoğlu | Adidas | Beko |
| Galatasaray Ekmas | (Turkey) Yakup Sekizkök | (Turkey) Göksenin Köksal | Umbro | Ekmas |
| Manisa BB | (Turkey) Hakan Demir | (Mexico) Pako Cruz | Wsports | Vestel |
| ONVO Büyükçekmece | (Turkey) Özhan Çıvgın | (Turkey) Erdi Gülaslan | Dafron | Onvo |
| Petkim Spor | (Turkey) Burak Gören | (Turkey) Yunus Emre Sonsırma | Playoff | Petkim |
| Pınar Karşıyaka | (Turkey) Ufuk Sarıca | (Turkey) Kenan Sipahi | Kappa | Pınar |
| Reeder Samsunspor | (Turkey) Cihan Özolcay | (Turkey) Göktuğ Baş | Hummel | Uslu ÇSM |
| Tofaş | (Turkey) Orhun Ene | (Turkey) Tevfik Akdamar | S by Sportive | Fiat |
| Türk Telekom | (Turkey) Selçuk Ernak | (Turkey) Mehmet Yağmur | S by Sportive | Türk Telekom |
| Yukatel Merkezefendi Basket | (Turkey) Zafer Aktaş | (United States) Nate Mason | Geges | Yukatel |

=== Head coaching changes ===
| Team | Outgoing manager | Manner of departure | Date of vacancy | Position in table | Replaced with | Date of appointment |
|---|---|---|---|---|---|---|
| Manisa BB | (Turkey) Hakan Demir | Mutual consent | 29 May 2023 | Pre-season | (Turkey) Ahmet Kandemir | 1 June 2023 |
| Türk Telekom | (Turkey) Erdem Can | Mutual consent | 16 June 2023 | Pre-season | (Serbia) Nenad Čanak | 19 June 2023 |
| Beşiktaş Emlakjet | (Poland) Igor Miličić | Mutual consent | 16 June 2023 | Pre-season | (Serbia) Dušan Alimpijević | 29 June 2023 |
| Anadolu Efes | (Turkey) Ergin Ataman | Mutual consent | 19 June 2023 | Pre-season | (Turkey) Erdem Can | 20 June 2023 |
| Darüşşafaka Lassa | (Turkey) Selçuk Ernak | Mutual consent | 22 June 2023 | Pre-season | (Turkey) Yakup Sekizkök | 23 June 2023 |
| Bursaspor İnfo Yatırım | (Serbia) Dušan Alimpijević | Mutual consent | 29 June 2023 | Pre-season | (Slovenia) Jure Zdovc | 7 July 2023 |
| Türk Telekom | (Serbia) Nenad Čanak | Mutual consent | 24 October 2023 | 9th (2–2) | (Turkey) Selçuk Ernak | 26 October 2023 |
| Fenerbahçe Beko | (Greece) Dimitrios Itoudis | Mutual consent | 13 December 2023 | 2nd (8–3) | (Lithuania) Šarūnas Jasikevičius | 14 December 2023 |
| Çağdaş Bodrumspor | (Turkey) Ender Arslan | Mutual consent | 18 December 2023 | 14th (3–9) | (Turkey) Ahmet Çakı | 21 December 2023 |
| Bahçeşehir Koleji | (Turkey) Sinan Atalay | Mutual consent | 27 December 2023 | 8th (6–7) | (Montenegro) Dejan Radonjić | 27 December 2023 |
| Manisa BB | (Turkey) Ahmet Kandemir | Mutual consent | 30 December 2023 | 8th (7–7) | (Turkey) Hakan Demir | 31 December 2023 |
| Reeder Samsunspor | (Turkey) İlker Salman | Mutual consent | 8 January 2024 | 16th (2–13) | (Turkey) Cihan Özolcay | 8 January 2024 |
| Bursaspor İnfo Yatırım | (Slovenia) Jure Zdovc | Mutual consent | 16 January 2024 | 9th (7–9) | (Turkey) Serhan Kavut | 16 January 2024 |
| Galatasaray Ekmas | (Montenegro) Zvezdan Mitrović | Mutual consent | 31 January 2024 | 7th (9–9) | (Turkey) Yakup Sekizkök | 2 February 2024 |
| Anadolu Efes | (Turkey) Erdem Can | Mutual consent | 1 February 2024 | 1st (15–3) | (Croatia) Tomislav Mijatović | 1 February 2024 |
| Darüşşafaka Lassa | (Turkey) Yakup Sekizkök | Mutual consent | 2 February 2024 | 8th (9–9) | (Turkey) Rüçhan Tamsöz | 2 February 2024 |

== Regular season ==
=== League table ===
| Pos | Team | Pld | W | L | PF | PA | PD | Pts | Qualification or relegation |
|---|---|---|---|---|---|---|---|---|---|
| 1 | Anadolu Efes | 30 | 25 | 5 | 2613 | 2417 | +196 | 55 | Advance to playoffs |
| 2 | Fenerbahçe Beko (C) | 30 | 25 | 5 | 2773 | 2308 | +465 | 55 | Advance to playoffs |
| 3 | Beşiktaş Emlakjet | 30 | 21 | 9 | 2462 | 2236 | +226 | 51 | Advance to playoffs |
| 4 | Pınar Karşıyaka | 30 | 21 | 9 | 2691 | 2531 | +160 | 51 | Advance to playoffs |
| 5 | Galatasaray Ekmas | 30 | 16 | 14 | 2544 | 2479 | +65 | 46 | Advance to playoffs |
| 6 | Manisa BB | 30 | 16 | 14 | 2468 | 2514 | −46 | 46 | Advance to playoffs |
| 7 | Petkim Spor | 30 | 15 | 15 | 2531 | 2471 | +60 | 45 | Advance to playoffs |
| 8 | Türk Telekom | 30 | 14 | 16 | 2457 | 2441 | +16 | 44 | Advance to playoffs |
| 9 | Bursaspor İnfo Yatırım | 30 | 14 | 16 | 2518 | 2574 | −56 | 44 | |
| 10 | ONVO Büyükçekmece | 30 | 13 | 17 | 2474 | 2467 | +7 | 43 | |
| 11 | Tofaş | 30 | 13 | 17 | 2589 | 2633 | −44 | 43 | |
| 12 | Yukatel Merkezefendi Basket | 30 | 12 | 18 | 2401 | 2556 | −155 | 42 | |
| 13 | Bahçeşehir Koleji | 30 | 12 | 18 | 2590 | 2611 | −21 | 42 | |
| 14 | Darüşşafaka Lassa | 30 | 12 | 18 | 2411 | 2557 | −146 | 42 | |
| 15 | Çağdaş Bodrumspor (R) | 30 | 8 | 22 | 2391 | 2585 | −194 | 38 | Relegation to TBL |
| 16 | Reeder Samsunspor (R) | 30 | 3 | 27 | 2183 | 2716 | −533 | 33 | Relegation to TBL |

Source: Basketbol Süper Ligi
(C) Champions; (R) Relegated

=== Positions by round ===
| Team ╲ Round | 1 | 2 | 3 | 4 | 5 | 6 | 7 | 8 | 9 | 10 | 11 | 12 | 13 | 14 | 15 | 16 | 17 | 18 | 19 | 20 | 21 | 22 | 23 | 24 | 25 | 26 | 27 | 28 | 29 | 30 |
|---|---|---|---|---|---|---|---|---|---|---|---|---|---|---|---|---|---|---|---|---|---|---|---|---|---|---|---|---|---|---|
| Anadolu Efes | 5 | 1 | 1 | 1 | 3 | 2 | 2 | 2 | 2 | 1 | 1 | 1 | 1 | 1 | 1 | 1 | 1 | 1 | 1 | 1 | 1 | 1 | 1 | 1 | 1 | 1 | 1 | 1 | 1 | 1 |
| Fenerbahçe Beko | 1 | 3 | 2 | 2 | 1 | 1 | 1 | 1 | 1 | 2 | 2 | 2 | 2 | 2 | 2 | 2 | 2 | 2 | 2 | 2 | 2 | 2 | 2 | 2 | 2 | 2 | 2 | 2 | 2 | 2 |
| Beşiktaş Emlakjet | 10 | 4 | 10 | 5 | 5 | 4 | 3 | 3 | 3 | 4 | 4 | 4 | 4 | 4 | 3 | 3 | 3 | 3 | 3 | 3 | 3 | 3 | 3 | 3 | 3 | 3 | 3 | 3 | 3 | 3 |
| Pınar Karşıyaka | 13 | 13 | 13 | 8 | 8 | 8 | 7 | 5 | 4 | 3 | 3 | 3 | 3 | 3 | 4 | 4 | 4 | 4 | 4 | 4 | 4 | 4 | 4 | 4 | 4 | 4 | 4 | 4 | 4 | 4 |
| Galatasaray Ekmas | 2 | 2 | 4 | 6 | 6 | 7 | 10 | 10 | 9 | 11 | 11 | 13 | 13 | 10 | 7 | 12 | 8 | 7 | 8 | 8 | 8 | 7 | 5 | 5 | 5 | 7 | 7 | 6 | 6 | 5 |
| Manisa BB | 8 | 10 | 3 | 3 | 2 | 3 | 6 | 8 | 10 | 8 | 5 | 5 | 6 | 8 | 6 | 5 | 6 | 5 | 5 | 5 | 5 | 6 | 7 | 7 | 6 | 5 | 6 | 5 | 5 | 6 |
| Petkim Spor | 4 | 7 | 7 | 4 | 4 | 5 | 4 | 6 | 7 | 7 | 9 | 6 | 7 | 5 | 5 | 6 | 5 | 6 | 6 | 6 | 6 | 5 | 5 | 6 | 7 | 6 | 5 | 7 | 7 | 7 |
| Türk Telekom | 6 | 6 | 5 | 9 | 9 | 10 | 8 | 9 | 8 | 9 | 6 | 9 | 11 | 12 | 12 | 7 | 10 | 10 | 9 | 10 | 10 | 9 | 9 | 9 | 10 | 10 | 11 | 8 | 10 | 8 |
| Bursaspor İnfo Yatırım | 11 | 8 | 6 | 7 | 7 | 9 | 9 | 7 | 5 | 5 | 7 | 8 | 5 | 6 | 9 | 9 | 12 | 11 | 11 | 11 | 11 | 11 | 11 | 10 | 12 | 11 | 10 | 9 | 11 | 9 |
| ONVO Büyükçekmece | 12 | 14 | 12 | 10 | 10 | 13 | 13 | 13 | 13 | 13 | 13 | 12 | 10 | 11 | 13 | 13 | 9 | 12 | 13 | 14 | 12 | 13 | 10 | 11 | 9 | 9 | 9 | 13 | 8 | 10 |
| Tofaş | 3 | 11 | 9 | 11 | 11 | 12 | 12 | 11 | 11 | 10 | 10 | 7 | 9 | 7 | 10 | 8 | 11 | 9 | 10 | 9 | 9 | 10 | 12 | 12 | 11 | 12 | 12 | 10 | 9 | 11 |
| Yukatel Merkezefendi Basket | 15 | 15 | 15 | 16 | 16 | 15 | 15 | 15 | 16 | 15 | 15 | 15 | 15 | 15 | 15 | 15 | 14 | 14 | 15 | 15 | 15 | 15 | 15 | 14 | 14 | 14 | 14 | 14 | 14 | 12 |
| Bahçeşehir Koleji | 9 | 5 | 11 | 13 | 13 | 11 | 11 | 12 | 12 | 12 | 12 | 11 | 8 | 9 | 8 | 11 | 13 | 13 | 12 | 12 | 13 | 12 | 13 | 13 | 13 | 13 | 13 | 12 | 13 | 13 |
| Darüşşafaka Lassa | 7 | 9 | 8 | 12 | 12 | 6 | 5 | 4 | 6 | 6 | 8 | 10 | 12 | 13 | 11 | 10 | 7 | 8 | 7 | 7 | 7 | 8 | 8 | 8 | 8 | 8 | 8 | 11 | 12 | 14 |
| Çağdaş Bodrumspor | 16 | 16 | 16 | 14 | 14 | 14 | 14 | 15 | 14 | 14 | 14 | 14 | 14 | 14 | 14 | 14 | 15 | 15 | 14 | 13 | 14 | 14 | 14 | 15 | 15 | 15 | 15 | 15 | 15 | 15 |
| Reeder Samsunspor | 14 | 12 | 14 | 15 | 15 | 16 | 16 | 16 | 15 | 16 | 16 | 16 | 16 | 16 | 16 | 16 | 16 | 16 | 16 | 16 | 16 | 16 | 16 | 16 | 16 | 16 | 16 | 16 | 16 | 16 |

| Leader |
| Advance to the playoffs |
| Relegated |

Source: Basketbol Süper Ligi

=== Results ===
| Home \ Away | AEF | BAH | BJK | BUR | BOD | DSK | FEN | GAL | MBB | BÇB | PET | KSK | SAM | TOF | TTA | MEB |
|---|---|---|---|---|---|---|---|---|---|---|---|---|---|---|---|---|
| Anadolu Efes | — | 91–82 | 90–75 | 90–98 | 87–79 | 85–78 | 81–80 | 76–95 | 99–79 | 89–78 | 98–73 | 101–85 | 91–86 | 85–75 | 81–82 | 83–77 |
| Bahçeşehir Koleji | 80–87 | — | 96–93 | 67–80 | 89–86 | 86–93 | 105–110 | 90–89 | 78–81 | 98–90 | 91–80 | 85–93 | 98–69 | 85–90 | 90–92 | 86–79 |
| Beşiktaş Emlakjet | 85–77 | 95–94 | — | 88–59 | 96–90 | 88–72 | 68–64 | 76–77 | 76–73 | 85–72 | 66–62 | 115–66 | 111–55 | 69–54 | 77–66 | 79–58 |
| Bursaspor İnfo Yatırım | 73–83 | 104–91 | 82–76 | — | 83–69 | 68–64 | 112–116 | 65–81 | 102–94 | 94–81 | 94–84 | 68–102 | 78–74 | 89–95 | 69–103 | 85–87 |
| Çağdaş Bodrumspor | 75–87 | 74–80 | 82–90 | 87–76 | — | 89–73 | 92–93 | 77–81 | 67–87 | 83–79 | 62–80 | 97–98 | 71–83 | 78–80 | 79–88 | 88–84 |
| Darüşşafaka Lassa | 74–87 | 68–75 | 64–61 | 94–85 | 97–103 | — | 56–98 | 75–72 | 87–89 | 84–80 | 72–83 | 83–78 | 108–78 | 76–82 | 86–84 | 86–88 |
| Fenerbahçe Beko | 80–90 | 113–98 | 87–66 | 97–90 | 95–58 | 110–77 | — | 90–74 | 98–82 | 92–90 | 96–85 | 93–63 | 83–53 | 109–77 | 99–71 | 90–64 |
| Galatasaray Ekmas | 92–95 | 86–92 | 89–83 | 80–82 | 77–87 | 95–78 | 62–74 | — | 85–81 | 96–101 | 90–88 | 86–92 | 113–69 | 95–76 | 75–76 | 87–102 |
| Manisa BB | 76–81 | 90–88 | 78–70 | 98–95 | 65–79 | 69–62 | 69–82 | 80–83 | — | 64–78 | 90–106 | 80–98 | 90–60 | 91–89 | 81–67 | 93–76 |
| ONVO Büyükçekmece | 70–79 | 75–68 | 70–86 | 75–70 | 108–71 | 80–88 | 58–89 | 61–70 | 103–76 | — | 96–94 | 75–93 | 96–58 | 84–82 | 84–83 | 76–78 |
| Petkim Spor | 92–101 | 76–61 | 58–70 | 78–94 | 120–76 | 112–78 | 59–81 | 76–74 | 94–74 | 99–95 | — | 81–69 | 93–83 | 107–100 | 96–94 | 89–81 |
| Pınar Karşıyaka | 99–81 | 92–76 | 94–85 | 95–75 | 90–82 | 86–98 | 84–79 | 98–76 | 87–91 | 93–87 | 90–74 | — | 103–71 | 98–71 | 100–80 | 97–73 |
| Reeder Samsunspor | 73–93 | 69–105 | 70–76 | 80–108 | 61–100 | 90–98 | 75–96 | 70–72 | 71–77 | 67–71 | 67–81 | 80–82 | — | 87–86 | 55–75 | 95–85 |
| Tofaş | 93–95 | 88–86 | 81–85 | 91–85 | 102–82 | 83–90 | 86–95 | 102–107 | 77–89 | 73–94 | 84–71 | 111–91 | 104–91 | — | 79–62 | 98–77 |
| Türk Telekom | 69–71 | 92–95 | 83–89 | 72–68 | 73–60 | 90–71 | 95–91 | 90–92 | 79–83 | 71–74 | 81–79 | 70–81 | 89–69 | 87–83 | — | 112–89 |
| Yukatel Merkezefendi Basket | 64–79 | 86–75 | 73–83 | 82–87 | 83–68 | 83–81 | 68–93 | 77–93 | 82–68 | 94–93 | 63–61 | 107–94 | 83–74 | 93–97 | 95–81 | — |

Source: Basketbol Süper Ligi
Legend: Blue = home team win; Red = away team win.
Matches with lighter background shading were decided after overtime.

== Playoffs ==
Quarterfinals will be played best-of-three format (1–1–1), semifinals and finals will be played in a best-of-five format (2–2–1).

=== Bracket ===
Quarterfinals
1 | Anadolu Efes | 2
8 | Türk Telekom | 0
4 | Pınar Karşıyaka | 2
5 | Galatasaray Ekmas | 1
2 | Fenerbahçe Beko | 2
7 | Petkim Spor | 0
3 | Beşiktaş Emlakjet | 2
6 | Manisa BB | 0

Semifinals
1 | Anadolu Efes | 3
4 | Pınar Karşıyaka | 0
2 | Fenerbahçe Beko | 3
3 | Beşiktaş Emlakjet | 0

Finals
1 | Anadolu Efes | 1
2 | Fenerbahçe Beko | 3

=== Quarterfinals ===
| Team 1 | Series | Team 2 | Game 1 | Game 2 | Game 3 |
|---|---|---|---|---|---|
| Anadolu Efes | 2–0 | Türk Telekom | 99–79 | 86–78 | — |
| Fenerbahçe Beko | 2–0 | Petkim Spor | 102–72 | 100–71 | — |
| Beşiktaş Emlakjet | 2–0 | Manisa BB | 92–74 | 83–74 | — |
| Pınar Karşıyaka | 2–1 | Galatasaray Ekmas | 95–96 | 90–87 | 97–82 |

=== Semifinals ===
| Team 1 | Series | Team 2 | Game 1 | Game 2 | Game 3 | Game 4 | Game 5 |
|---|---|---|---|---|---|---|---|
| Anadolu Efes | 3–0 | Pınar Karşıyaka | 103–80 | 82–68 | 97–90 | — | — |
| Fenerbahçe Beko | 3–0 | Beşiktaş Emlakjet | 96–88 | 98–72 | 86–77 | — | — |

=== Finals ===
| Team 1 | Series | Team 2 | Game 1 | Game 2 | Game 3 | Game 4 | Game 5 |
|---|---|---|---|---|---|---|---|
| Anadolu Efes | 1–3 | Fenerbahçe Beko | 74–85 | 70–101 | 82–81 | 72–80 | — |

==== Game 1 ====
| 6 June 2024 | Anadolu Efes | 74–85 | Fenerbahçe Beko |
| 20:30 | Scoring by quarter: 16–22, 20–29, 15–20, 23–14 |
| | Pts: Osmani 18; Rebs: Osmani 6 Asts: Larkin 8 | Boxscore | Pts: Hayes-Davis 28; Rebs: four players 5 Asts: Calathes 11 | Arena: Sinan Erdem Dome |

==== Game 2 ====
| 8 June 2024 | Anadolu Efes | 70–101 | Fenerbahçe Beko |
| 20:30 | Scoring by quarter: 16–31, 22–22, 13–25, 19–23 |
| | Pts: Oturu 21; Rebs: Bryant, Oturu 9 Asts: Bryant 4 | Boxscore | Pts: Wilbekin 24; Rebs: Papagiannis 8 Asts: Calathes 8 | Arena: Sinan Erdem Dome |

==== Game 3 ====
| 10 June 2024 | Fenerbahçe Beko | 81–82 | Anadolu Efes |
| 20:30 | Scoring by quarter: 16–13, 23–21, 17–22, 25–26 |
| | Pts: Wilbekin 17; Hayes-Davis 16; Rebs: Hayes-Davis 5 Asts: Calathes 12 | Boxscore | Pts: Willis 20; Rebs: Larkin 5 Asts: Larkin 7 | Arena: Ulker Sports Arena |

==== Game 4 ====
| 12 June 2024 | Fenerbahçe Beko | 80–72(OT) | Anadolu Efes |
| 20:30 | Scoring by quarter: 22–8, 14–25, 15–19, 13–12, Overtime: 16–8 |
| | Pts: Biberovic 19; Rebs: Papagiannis 9 Asts: Calathes 10 | Boxscore | Pts: Bryant 20; Rebs: Oturu 7 Asts: Bryant, Larkin 4 | Arena: Sinan Erdem Dome |

== Statistical leaders ==
=== Efficiency ===
| Pos | Player | Club | PIR |
|---|---|---|---|
| 1 | (United States) Austin Wiley | Tofaş | 22.79 |
| 2 | (United States) Daniel Oturu | Merkezefendi/Anadolu Efes | 21.27 |
| 3 | (United States) Errick McCollum | Pınar Karşıyaka | 20.59 |
| 4 | (United States) Marcquise Reed | ONVO Büyükçekmece | 20.27 |
| 5 | (United States) Emanuel Terry | Manisa BB | 19.33 |

=== Points ===
| Pos | Player | Club | PPG |
|---|---|---|---|
| 1 | (United States) Marcquise Reed | ONVO Büyükçekmece | 21.10 |
| 2 | (United States) David Efianayi | Petkim Spor | 20.36 |
| 3 | (United States) Nate Mason | Yukatel Merkezefendi | 19.64 |
| 4 | (United States) Errick McCollum | Pınar Karşıyaka | 19.00 |
| 5 | (United States) Daniel Oturu | Merkezefendi/Anadolu Efes | 18.23 |

=== Rebounds ===
| Pos | Player | Club | RPG |
|---|---|---|---|
| 1 | (United States) Austin Wiley | Tofaş | 10.08 |
| 2 | (Dominican Republic) Ángel Delgado | Beşiktaş Emlakjet | 9.36 |
| 3 | (France) Jerry Boutsiele | Bahçeşehir Koleji | 8.77 |
| 4 | (United States) Emanuel Terry | Manisa BB | 8.40 |
| 5 | (United States) Daniel Oturu | Merkezefendi/Anadolu Efes | 7.68 |

=== Assists ===
| Pos | Player | Club | APG |
|---|---|---|---|
| 1 | (United States) Nate Mason | Yukatel Merkezefendi | 7.09 |
| 2 | (Mexico) Alex Pérez | ONVO Büyükçekmece | 6.82 |
| 3 | (Israel) Yam Madar | Fenerbahçe Beko | 6.28 |
| 4 | (Slovenia) Klemen Prepelič | Galatasaray Ekmas | 6.12 |
| 5 | (United States) Fatts Russell | Manisa BB | 5.92 |

Source: Basketbol Süper Ligi

== Awards ==
All official awards of the 2023–24 Basketbol Süper Ligi.

=== Season awards ===
| Award | Player | Team | Ref. |
|---|---|---|---|
| Regular Season MVP | (United States) Austin Wiley | Tofaş | |
| Finals MVP | (United States) Nigel Hayes-Davis | Fenerbahçe Beko | |

=== MVP of the Month ===
| Month | Player | Team | EFF | Ref. |
2023
| October | (United States) Emanuel Terry | Manisa Büyükşehir Belediyespor | 21.3 | |
| November | (United States) Vernon Carey Jr. | Pınar Karşıyaka | 23.0 | |
| December | (Mexico) Alex Pérez | ONVO Büyükçekmece | 21.0 | |
2024
| January | (Turkey) Melih Mahmutoğlu | Fenerbahçe Beko | 19.2 | |

=== MVP of the Round ===
| Gameday | Player | Team | EFF | Ref. |
|---|---|---|---|---|
| 1 | (Mexico) Pako Cruz | Manisa Büyükşehir Belediyespor | 35 | |
| 2 | (United States) Tyler Cavanaugh | Bahçeşehir Koleji | 28 | |
| 3 | (France) Rodrigue Beaubois | Anadolu Efes | 33 | |
| 4 | (Jordan) Ahmet Düverioğlu | Çağdaş Bodrumspor | 36 | |
| 5 | (France) Jerry Boutsiele | Bahçeşehir Koleji | 30 | |
| 6 | (Croatia) Ante Žižić | Anadolu Efes | 35 | |
| 7 | (United States) Anthony Brown | Bursaspor İnfo Yatırım | 31 | |
| 8 | (Latvia) Jānis Timma | Darüşşafaka Lassa | 34 | |
| 9 | (United States) Vernon Carey Jr. | Pınar Karşıyaka | 35 | |
| 10 | (United States) Austin Wiley | Tofaş | 41 | |
| 11 | (United States) Vernon Carey Jr. (x2) | Pınar Karşıyaka | 32 | |
| 12 | (United States) Austin Wiley (x2) | Tofaş | 35 | |
| 13 | (Bosnia and Herzegovina) (Turkey) Tarik Biberović | Fenerbahçe Beko | 34 | |
| 14 | (Israel) Yam Madar | Fenerbahçe Beko | 39 | |
| 15 | (United States) Daniel Oturu | Anadolu Efes | 39 | |
| 16 | (United States) Moses Wright | Yukatel Merkezefendi | 38 | |
| 17 | (United States) Darius Thompson | Anadolu Efes | 31 | |
| 18 | (United States) Vitto Brown | Pınar Karşıyaka | 36 | |
| 19 | (United States) Jordan Floyd | Bursaspor İnfo Yatırım | 37 | |
| 20 | (Serbia) Marko Pecarski | Yukatel Merkezefendi | 34 | |
| 21 | (United States) Marcquise Reed | ONVO Büyükçekmece | 43 | |
| 22 | (United States) Errick McCollum | Pınar Karşıyaka | 34 | |
| 23 | (United States) Tyrone Wallace | Türk Telekom | 36 | |
| 24 | (United States) Will Clyburn | Anadolu Efes | 29 | |
| 25 | (Serbia) Marko Pecarski (x2) | Yukatel Merkezefendi | 36 | |
| 26 | (France) Axel Bouteille | Bahçeşehir Koleji | 30 | |
| 27 | (United States) Nike Sibande | Yukatel Merkezefendi | 35 | |
| 28 | (United States) Caleb Homesley | Tofaş | 31 | |
| 29 | (United States) Shane Larkin | Anadolu Efes | 33 | |
| 30 | (United States) Errick McCollum (x2) | Pınar Karşıyaka | 38 | |

== Turkish clubs in European competitions ==
| Team | Competition | Progress |
|---|---|---|
| Anadolu Efes | EuroLeague | Play-in |
| Fenerbahçe Beko | EuroLeague | Final Four |
| Beşiktaş Emlakjet | EuroCup | Semifinals |
| Türk Telekom | EuroCup | Eighthfinals |
| Bursaspor İnfo Yatırım | Champions League | Regular Season |
| Darüşşafaka Lassa | Champions League | Play-ins |
| Galatasaray Ekmas | Champions League | Round of 16 |
| Pınar Karşıyaka | Champions League | Round of 16 |
| Tofaş | Champions League | Quarterfinals |
| Bahçeşehir Koleji | FIBA Europe Cup | Runners-up |
| Manisa BB | FIBA Europe Cup | Second round |
