= 2017 Turkey men's EuroBasket team =

Turkey cut its squad to 14 players on 18 August 2017.

Turkey men's national basketball team – EuroBasket 2017 roster
Players
Coaches

Pos.	No.	Name	Age – Date of birth	Height	Club	Ctr.
C		Furkan Aldemir	26 – 8 July 1991	2.08 m (6 ft 10 in)	Darüşşafaka	(Turkey)
PG		Doğuş Balbay	28 – 21 January 1989	1.85 m (6 ft 1 in)	Anadolu Efes	(Turkey)
C		Semih Erden	31 – 28 July 1986	2.13 m (7 ft 0 in)	Darüşşafaka	(Turkey)
SG		Sinan Güler	33 – 8 November 1983	1.92 m (6 ft 4 in)	Fenerbahçe	(Turkey)
PF		Barış Hersek	29 – 26 March 1988	2.08 m (6 ft 10 in)	Fenerbahçe	(Turkey)
SG		Göksenin Köksal	26 – 8 January 1991	1.97 m (6 ft 6 in)	Galatasaray	(Turkey)
SG		Furkan Korkmaz	20 – 24 July 1997	2.01 m (6 ft 7 in)	Philadelphia 76ers	(United States)
SG		Melih Mahmutoğlu	27 – 12 May 1990	1.91 m (6 ft 3 in)	Fenerbahçe	(Turkey)
PG		Ali Muhammed	34 – 10 April 1983	1.78 m (5 ft 10 in)	Fenerbahçe	(Turkey)
SF		Cedi Osman	22 – 8 April 1995	2.03 m (6 ft 8 in)	Cleveland Cavaliers	(United States)
C		Sertaç Şanlı	26 – 1 January 1991	2.13 m (7 ft 0 in)	Beşiktaş	(Turkey)
PG		Kenan Sipahi	22 – 26 May 1995	1.97 m (6 ft 6 in)	Beşiktaş	(Turkey)
PF		Metin Türen	23 – 2 May 1994	2.06 m (6 ft 9 in)	Darüşşafaka	(Turkey)
SF		Erkan Veyseloğlu	34 – 13 March 1983	2.00 m (6 ft 7 in)	Beşiktaş	(Turkey)

Head coach

- (Turkey) Ufuk Sarıca

Assistant coach

- (Turkey) Ertuğrul Erdoğan
- (Turkey) Erdem Can
- (Turkey) Arda Demirbağ

Legend

- Club – describes last
  club before the tournament
- Age – describes age
  on 31 August 2017

== Exhibition games ==
August 16, 2017
17:00

Report

Czech Republic	66–67	Turkey
Scoring by quarter: 16–21, 15–12, 17–19, 18–15
Pts: Jaromir Bahocik 16; Rebs: Jaromir Bahocik 6 Asts: Tomáš Satoranský 5		Pts: Cedi Osman 19; Rebs: Cedi Osman 8 Asts: Sinan Güler 6

Královka Arena, Prague
Attendance: 1,500
