= Nate Mason =

American basketball player (born 1995)

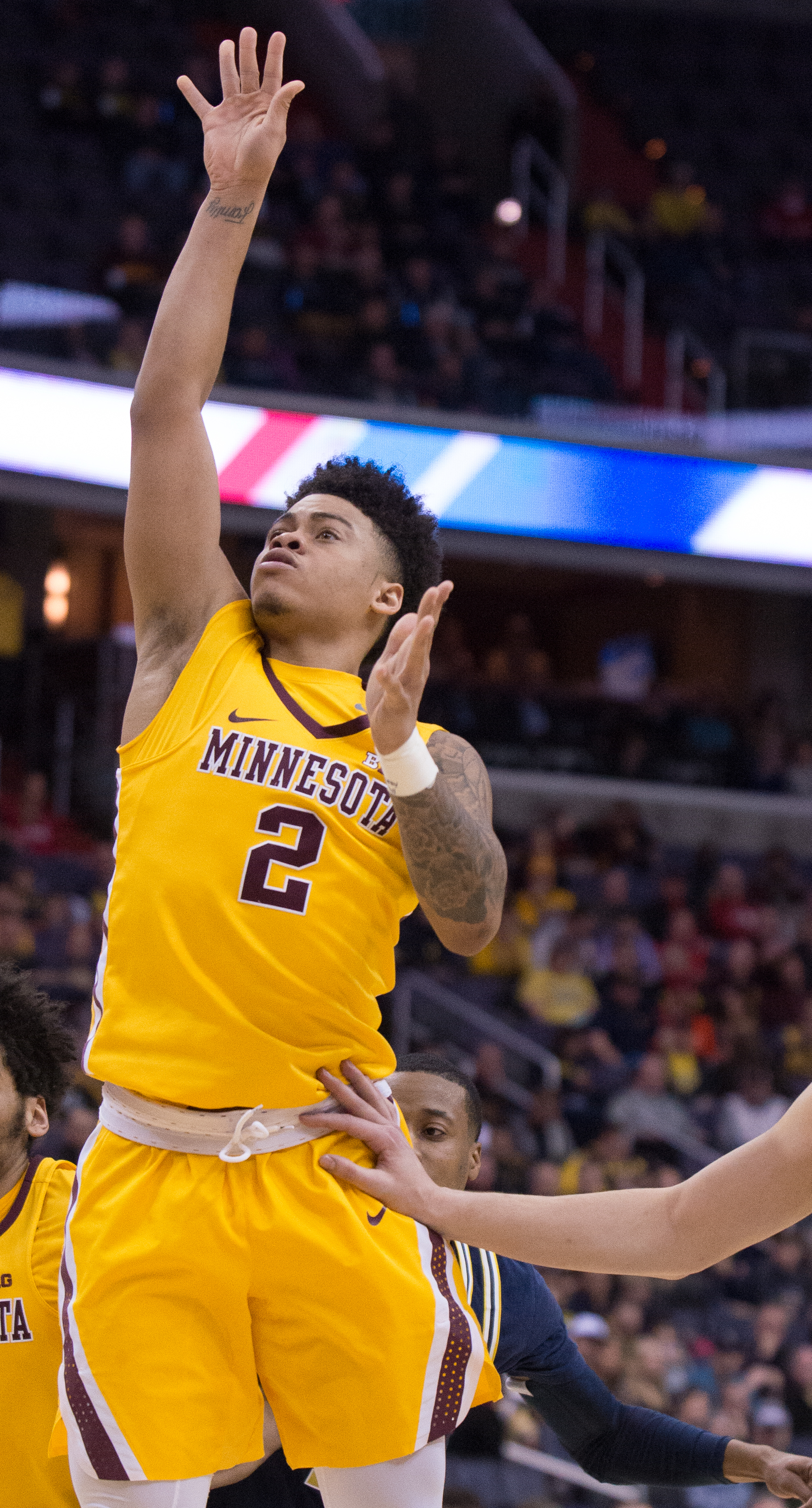
- Mason playing for Minnesota

Budućnost
- Position: Point guard / shooting guard
- League: Prva A Liga; ABA League; EuroCup

Personal information
- Born: July 25, 1995 (age 31) Decatur, Georgia, U.S.
- Listed height: 6 ft 2 in (1.88 m)
- Listed weight: 190 lb (86 kg)

Career information
- High school: Columbia (Decatur, Georgia); Shiloh (Snellville, Georgia); Arlington Country Day School (Jacksonville, Florida)
- College: Minnesota (2014–2018)
- NBA draft: 2018: undrafted
- Playing career: 2019–present

Career history
- 2019–2020: Texas Legends
- 2020: Hapoel Eilat
- 2020–2021: Avtodor
- 2021–2023: Guangzhou Loong Lions
- 2022–2023: Atléticos de San Germán
- 2023: Le Mans
- 2023–2024: Yukatel Merkezefendi
- 2024: Atléticos de San Germán
- 2024–2026: Dubai Basketball
- 2026: Zenit Saint Petersburg
- 2026–present: Budućnost

Career highlights
- Turkish League assists leader (2024); VTB United League All-Star (2021); First-team All-Big Ten (2017)

Nathaniel Marvin Mason (born July 25, 1995) is an American professional basketball player for Budućnost of the Montenegrin Prva A Liga, the ABA League, and the EuroCup. He played college basketball for the Minnesota Golden Gophers. Mason attended High School at Arlington Country Day School in Jacksonville, Florida.

== High school career ==
College recruiting
Name	Hometown	School	Height	Weight	Commit date
Nate Mason; PG	Decatur, Ga	Arlington Day	6 ft 1 in (1.85 m)	180 lb (82 kg)	Oct 25, 2014
Nate Mason; PG	Recruit ratings: Scout: Rivals: 247Sports: ESPN:				
Overall recruit ranking:
Note: In many cases, Scout, Rivals, 247Sports, On3, and ESPN may conflict in their listings of height and weight.; In these cases, the average was taken. ESPN grades are on a 100-point scale.; Sources: "2014 Team Ranking". Rivals.

== College career ==
=== 2014–2015 season ===
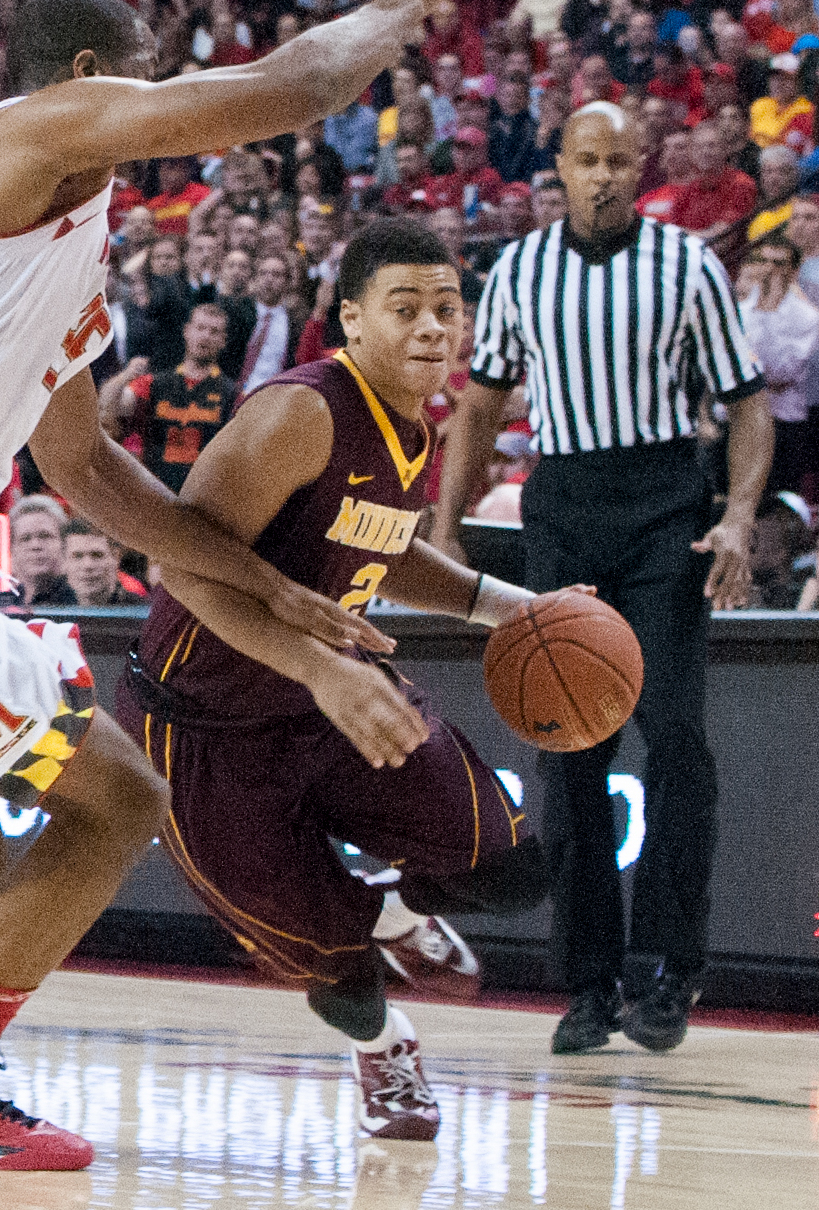
Mason in 2015

Mason appeared in every game as a freshman, ranking second on the team in steals and assists as a true freshman. He averaged 9.8 points per game, which ranked 4th on the team. He registered 17 games where he scored at least 10 points, including his collegiate debut, where he scored 10 points, 5 rebounds, 1 block, 1 steal and one assist.

=== 2015–2016 season ===
Mason appeared in 27 games as a sophomore, and every game until he was suspended for the last 4 games of the season. He led the team in scoring at 13.8 points per game and also led the team in assists at 4.5 per game. He had 21 games where he scored in double figures and had 1 game where he had double digit assists. Against Temple he had 20 points which was a career high up until that point. He broke that career high later in the season against Michigan, with 25 points.

=== 2016–2017 season ===
Mason appeared in every game as a junior, and for the second year in a row he led the team in scoring and assists with 15.2 points per game, and 5.0 assists per game. He also led the team in steals, with 1.4 a game. He registered 30 games with more than 10 points, which was all but 4 games in the season. He also had 2 games with double-digit assists, and recorded 1 game with more than 10 rebounds. On January 1, 2017, he set a new career high in points at Purdue, with 31 points. On March 6, 2017, it was announced that Mason was named first-team All-Big Ten.

=== 2017–2018 season ===
Mason appeared in 31 games, all but one as a senior, and finished 2nd on the team in scoring at 16.7 points per game, while leading the team in assists at 4.2 per game and 3 pointers made with 77. On February 6, 2018, he set a career high with 34 points, and scored in double digits in all but 4 games. As a team, Minnesota struggled with key injuries and suspensions, but Mason was a bright spot in that. He was named an All Big-Ten Honorable Mention by the coaches and media. He finished 5th all time in scoring and 2nd all time in assists at Minnesota. After the season, he represented the Big Ten in the first 3X3U championships, in which 4 seniors who have used all their college eligibility are selected from each conference to play 3 on 3 basketball. He helped lead the Big Ten team to the championship, where they won $50,000 in addition to the $5,000 they had already won to split between the players.

== Professional career ==
=== Texas Legends ===
On February 4, 2019, Mason signed with the Texas Legends of the NBA G League. Mason scored 22 points in a loss to the Windy City Bulls on December 20. He missed some time in January 2020 with a shoulder injury.

=== Hapoel Eilat ===
On January 31, 2020, Mason signed with Hapoel Eilat of the Israeli Premier League for the rest of the season. Mason averaged 11.0 points per game, 3.3 assist per game and 0.7 rebounds per game.

=== BC Avtodor ===
He signed a two-year deal with BC Avtodor of the VTB United League on June 26, 2020.

=== Guangzhou Long Lions ===
On October 30, 2021, Mason signed with the Guangzhou Loong Lions of the Chinese Basketball Association.

=== Le Mans ===
On July 25, 2023, he signed with Le Mans of the LNB Pro A.

=== Merkezefendi Belediyesi Denizli Basket ===
On November 9, 2023, he signed with Yukatel Merkezefendi of the Basketbol Süper Ligi (BSL).

=== Dubai Basketball ===
On July 12, 2024, Mason signed a two-year contract with Dubai Basketball of the United Arab Emirates and the ABA League. He was the first official signing for the newly established club.

=== Zenit Saint Petersburg ===
On July 31, 2026, Mason signed a one-year deal with Zenit Saint Petersburg of the VTB United League.

=== Budućnost Podgorica ===
On 21 November, 2026, Mason signed with Budućnost Podgorica of the Montenegrin Prva A Liga and the ABA League.

== College statistics ==
Legend
GP	Games played	GS	Games started	MPG	Minutes per game
FG%	Field goal percentage	3P%	3-point field goal percentage	FT%	Free throw percentage
RPG	Rebounds per game	APG	Assists per game	SPG	Steals per game
BPG	Blocks per game	PPG	Points per game	**Bold**	Career high

Year	Team	GP	GS	MPG	FG%	3P%	FT%	RPG	APG	SPG	BPG	PPG
2014–15	Minnesota	33	8	26.12	.409	.389	.614	2.8	2.8	1.4	0.1	9.8
2015–16	Minnesota	27	27	32.50	.389	.302	.796	2.8	4.5	0.9	0.0	13.8
2016–17	Minnesota	34	34	34.52	.376	.360	.808	3.6	5.0	1.4	0.1	15.2
2017–18	Minnesota	31	31	31.10	.393	.391	.776	3.6	4.2	1.1	0.1	16.7
Career		125	100	31.8	.390	.363	.762	3.3	4.1	1.3	0.1	13.8
