= Metin Türen =

Turkish basketball player

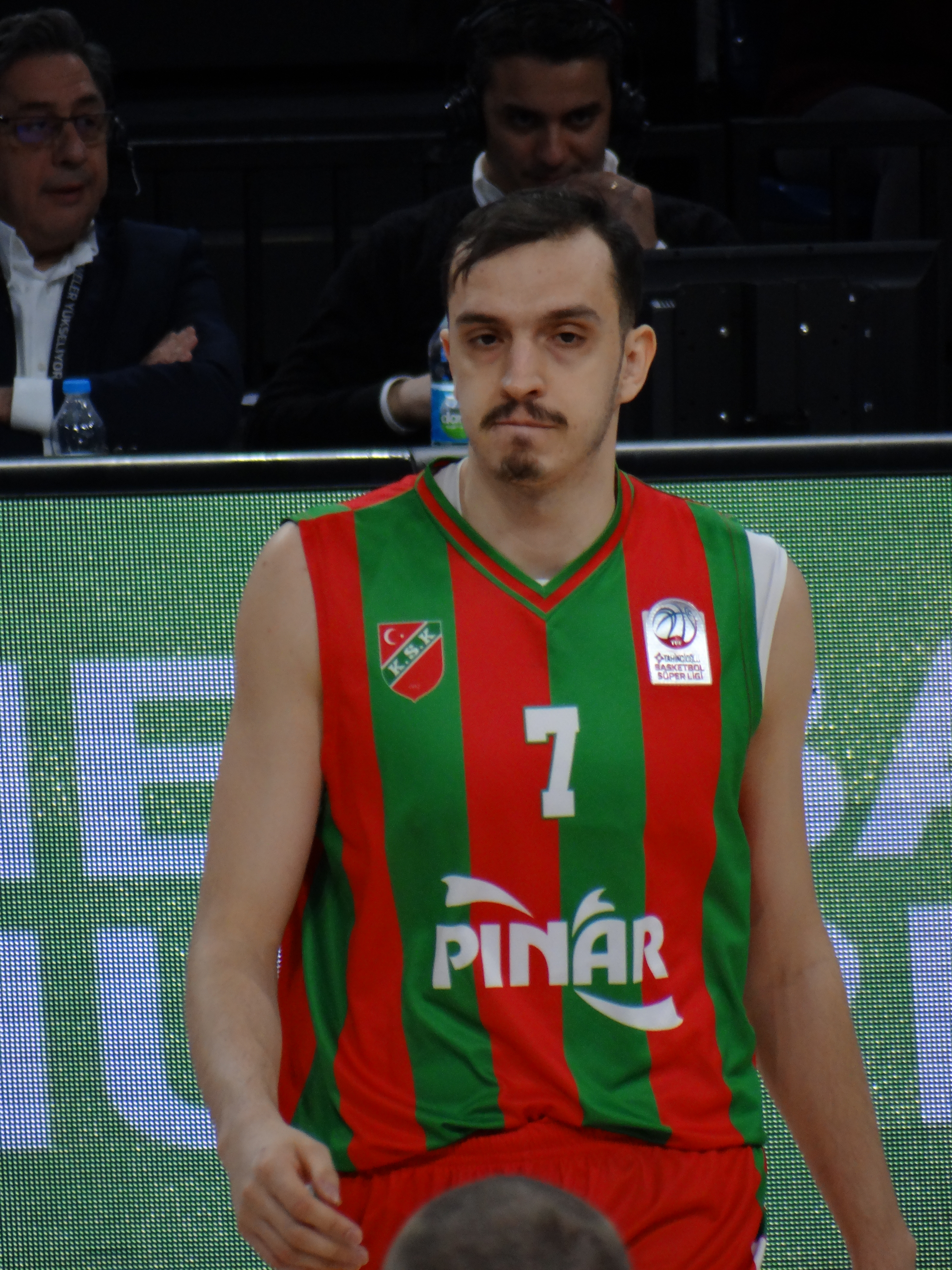

No. 7 – Yalova Harem Spor
- Position: Power forward
- League: TBL

Personal information
- Born: April 2, 1994 (age 32) Göztepe, Istanbul, Turkey
- Listed height: 6 ft 9 in (2.06 m)
- Listed weight: 209 lb (95 kg)

Career information
- Playing career: 2011–present

Career history
- 2011–2016: Darüşşafaka
- 2016–2017: Yeşilgiresun Belediye
- 2017–2018: Pınar Karşıyaka
- 2018–2020: Türk Telekom B.K.
- 2020–2022: Frutti Extra Bursaspor
- 2022–2024: Gaziantep Basketbol
- 2024: Bursaspor Basketbol
- 2024–2025: Merkezefendi Basket
- 2025–2026: Büyükçekmece Basketbol
- 2026–present: Yalova Harem Spor
Medals
Men's basketball
Representing Turkey
FIBA Europe Under-18 Championship
Bronze medal – third place	2011 Poland	U-18 Team

Metin Türen (born May 2, 1994) is a Turkish professional basketball player for Yalova Harem Spor of the Türkiye Basketbol Ligi (TBL). He plays as a power forward.

== Professional career ==
From 2018 to 2020, Türen played for Türk Telekom B.K. On October 9, 2020, he signed with Bursapor.

On August 2, 2023, he signed with Bursaspor of the Turkish Basketbol Süper Ligi (BSL).

On December 26, 2024, he signed with Yukatel Merkezefendi of the Basketbol Süper Ligi (BSL).

On August 20, 2025, he signed with ONVO Büyükçekmece of the Basketbol Süper Ligi (BSL).

On October 19, 2026, he signed with Yalova Harem Spor of the Türkiye Basketbol Ligi (TBL).
