= Daniel Oturu =

Nigerian-American basketball player (born 1999)

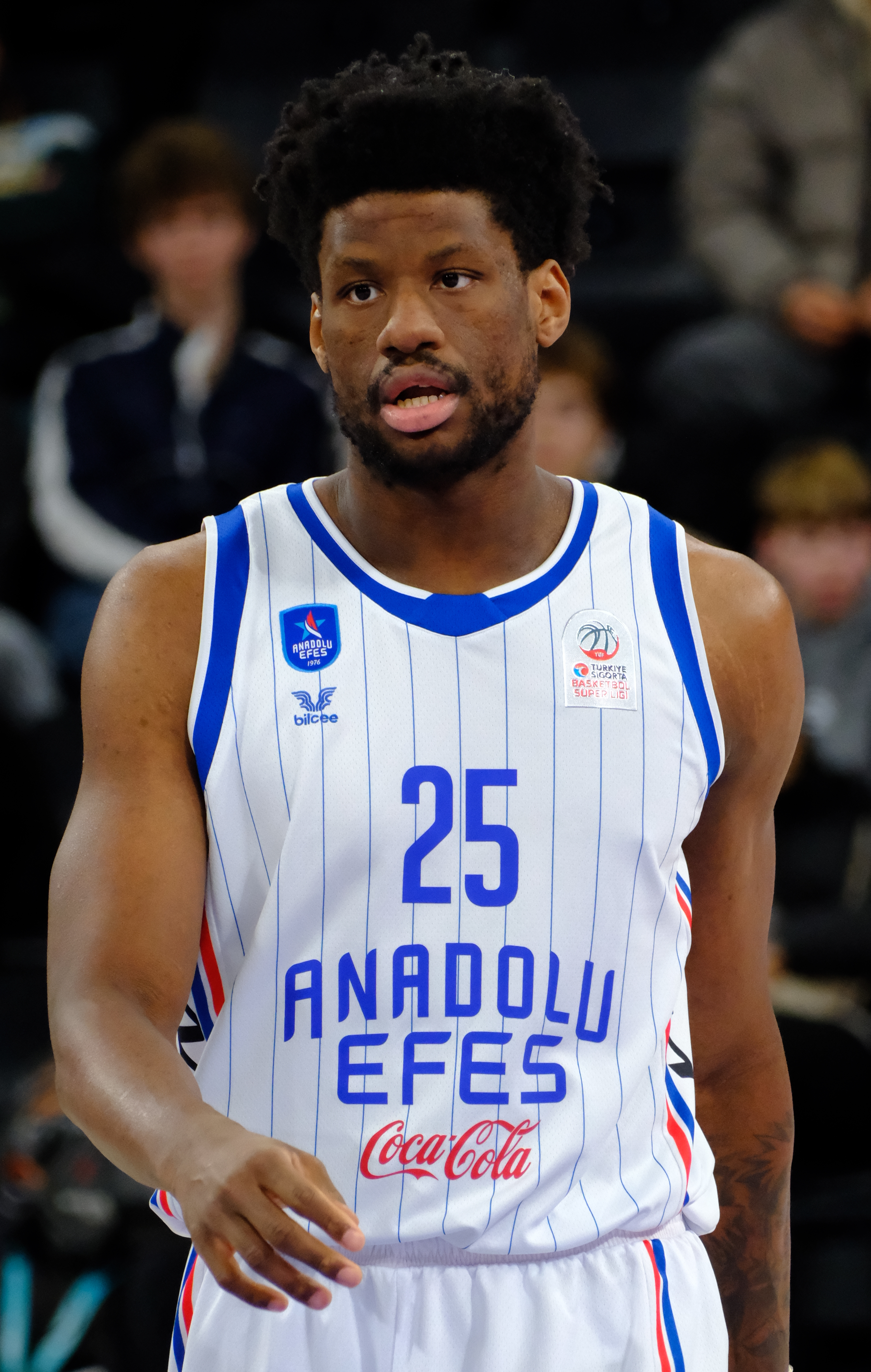
- Oturu with Anadolu Efes in 2024

No. 25 – Hapoel Tel Aviv
- Position: Center
- League: Israeli Basketball Premier League; EuroLeague

Personal information
- Born: September 20, 1999 (age 27) Brooklyn, New York, U.S.
- Listed height: 6 ft 10 in (2.08 m)
- Listed weight: 240 lb (109 kg)

Career information
- High school: Cretin-Derham Hall (Saint Paul, Minnesota)
- College: Minnesota (2018–2020)
- NBA draft: 2020: 2nd round, 33rd overall pick
- Drafted by: Minnesota Timberwolves
- Playing career: 2020–present

Career history
- 2020–2021: Los Angeles Clippers
- 2021: Windy City Bulls
- 2021–2022: Toronto Raptors
- 2022–2023: Windy City Bulls
- 2023–2024: Yukatel Merkezefendi
- 2023–2024: →Anadolu Efes
- 2024–2025: Anadolu Efes
- 2025–present: Hapoel Tel Aviv

Career highlights
- Turkish Super Cup winner (2024); Third-team All-American – SN (2020); Second-team All-Big Ten (2020); Big Ten All-Defensive Team (2020)
- Stats at NBA.com
- Stats at Basketball Reference

Akinfayoshe Daniel Oturu (born September 20, 1999) is a Nigerian-American professional basketball player for Hapoel Tel Aviv of the Israeli Basketball Premier League and the EuroLeague.

He played college basketball for the Minnesota Golden Gophers. With them, he was named to the 2020 Big Ten All-Defensive Team. He has also played for two NBA teams.

== High school career ==
Oturu played basketball for Cretin-Derham Hall High School in Saint Paul, Minnesota for four years. He grew from 6' 6" as a freshman to 6' 9" as a junior and developed good hand-eye coordination and navigation on the court. As a senior, he averaged 18.8 points, 11.5 rebounds, and 6.1 blocks per game, and became his school's all-time leader in each of the three categories.

In his final season, Oturu led his team to a Class 4A state championship over Apple Valley High School, scoring a game-winning dunk with 0.5 seconds left in regulation. Despite his strong play, he was excluded from the all-tournament team for sportsmanship reasons, as he had received a technical foul for shoving opposing player, Tre Jones, in the first half.

Oturu was invited to play for the World Select team, representing his parents' home country of Nigeria, at the Nike Hoop Summit in Portland, Oregon. He was considered a four-star recruit. He committed to play college basketball for Minnesota over offers from Kansas, among others.

== College career ==
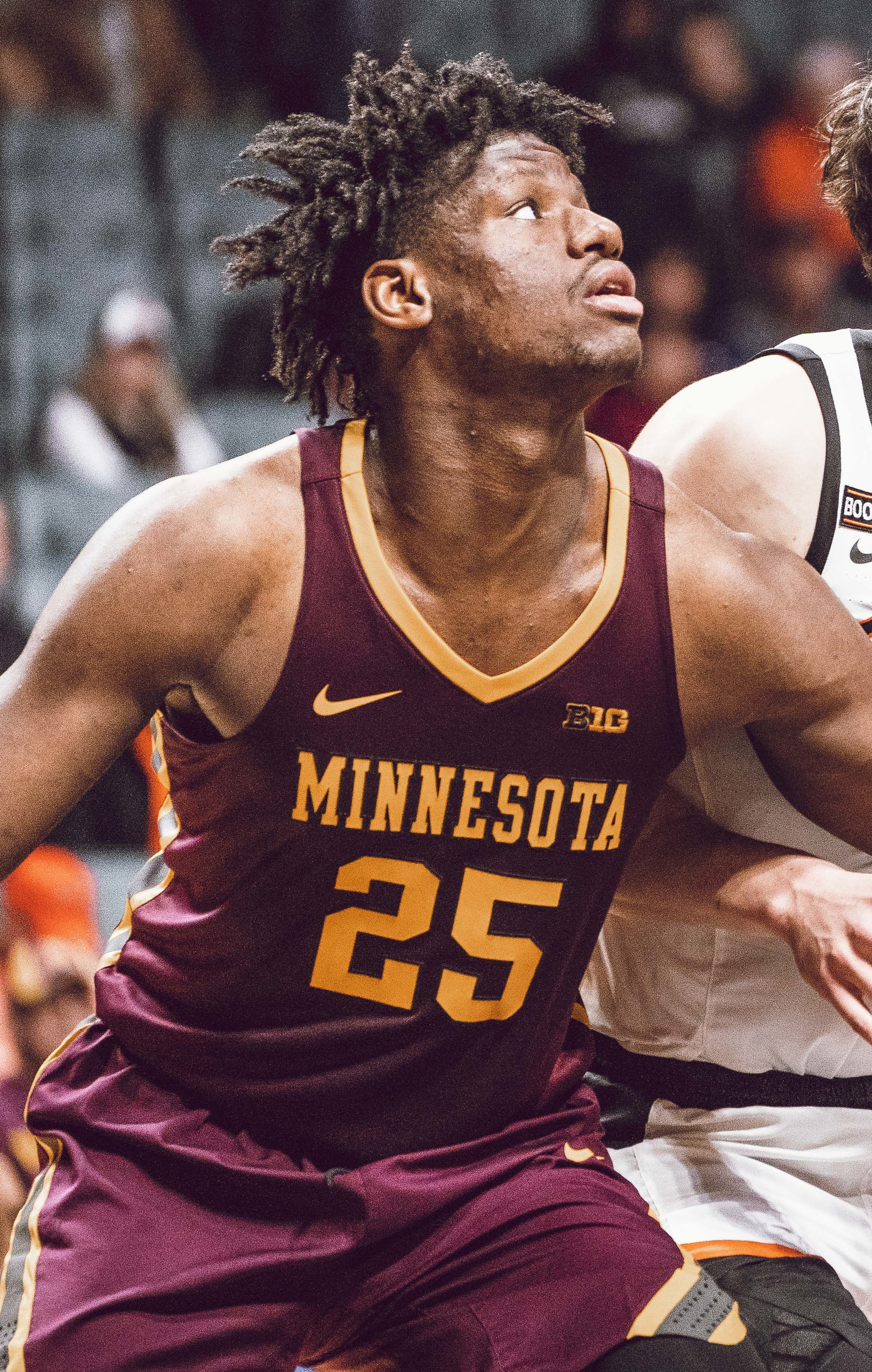
Oturu with Minnesota in 2019

Oturu had reconstructive right shoulder surgery prior to his freshman season playing for the Minnesota Golden Gophers. On December 24, 2018, Oturu was named Big Ten freshman of the week, after scoring 20 points and pulling down 11 rebounds in a 86–67 win over North Carolina A&T. He tied his season-high of 20 points in a 68–64 loss to Rutgers on February 24, 2019. Despite Oturu's strong play, he was not named to the Big Ten Freshman Team, which he cited as motivation. In 35 games, Oturu averaged 23.8 minutes, 10.8 points, 7.0 rebounds (leading the Big Ten), and 1.3 blocks (8th) per game, and led Big Ten freshman in blocked shots with 46, and field goal percentage at 55.1 percent (8th in the Big Ten). In the offseason, Oturu worked on bulking up to help replace the loss of Jordan Murphy.

During his sophomore season he was named Big Ten player of the week on December 30, after posting 21 points and a career-high 20 rebounds in an 89–62 win against Florida International, shooting 8-of-12 from the floor. On January 12, 2020, Oturu scored a career-high 30 points in a 75–67 upset of Michigan despite playing with a shoulder injury, a subluxation to his left shoulder. He was named Big Ten Player of the Week on January 13. For the season, in 31 games he averaged 34.0 minutes, led the Big Ten in rebounds per game (11.3; 8th in the nation), blocks per game (2.5), and field goal percentage (56.3%), and was second in points per game (20.1} and double-doubles (18; 7th in the nation).

At the close of the regular season, Oturu was named second-team All-Big Ten by the coaches and media, and to the All-Defensive Team. He was also named All-America Third Team by the Sporting News and CBS Sports, All America Honorable Mention by the Associated Press, and National Association of Basketball Coaches and USBWA All-District First Team.

== Professional career ==
=== Los Angeles Clippers (2020–2021) ===
Oturu was selected with the 33rd pick in the 2020 NBA draft by the Minnesota Timberwolves, becoming the first University of Minnesota player to be drafted since Kris Humphries in 2004. Oturu was subsequently traded to the Los Angeles Clippers. On November 28, 2020, the Los Angeles Clippers announced that they had signed with Oturu. Playing for the team in 2020-21, in 30 games he averaged 5.4 minutes, 1.8 points, and 1.6 rebounds per game.

=== Windy City Bulls (2021) ===
On August 16, 2021, Oturu was traded to the Memphis Grizzlies, who waived him on September 23. Four days later, he signed with the Chicago Bulls, but was waived on October 11. Oturu joined the Windy City Bulls as an affiliate player. Playing for the team in 2021-22, in 36 games he averaged 24.2 minutes, 14.7 points, 7.4 rebounds, and 1.1 assists per game, shooting 58.8% from the floor.

=== Toronto Raptors (2021–2022) ===
On December 26, 2021, Oturu signed a 10-day contract with the Toronto Raptors. He played three games for the team, in which in a total of 27.3 minutes, he scored 9 points and grabbed 5 rebounds while blocking two shots.

=== Return to Windy City Bulls (2022–2023) ===
On January 3, 2022, Oturu was reacquired and activated by the Windy City Bulls of the NBA G League. Playing for the team in 2022-23, in 36 games he averaged 16.2 minutes, 9.9 points, and 5.8 rebounds per game, shooting 61.5% from the floor.

=== Yukatel Merkezefendi (2023–2024) ===
On July 26, 2023, Oturu signed with Yukatel Merkezefendi of the Turkish Basketbol Süper Ligi. Playing for the team in 2023-24, in 10 games he averaged 32.9 minutes, 20.3 points, 9.6 rebounds, 1.4 assists 1.1 steals, and 1.6 blocks per game, shooting 65.2% from the floor.

==== Loan to Anadolu Efes and then permanent transfer (2023–2025) ====
On December 4, 2023, Oturu was loaned to Anadolu Efes of the Turkish Basketbol Süper Ligi (BSL), for whom he played 43 games.

Playing for the team in 2024-25, in 70 games he averaged 19.1 minutes, 11.3 points, 4.6 rebounds, 0.9 assists, and 1.2 blocks per game, shooting 71.2% from the floor.

=== Hapoel Tel Aviv (2025–present) ===
On July 6, 2025, Oturu signed with Hapoel Tel Aviv of the Israeli Basketball Premier League. On October 18, Oturu received Hoops Agents Player of the Week after having the game–high 18 points and nine rebounds. In May 2026, Oturu broke the all-time record for most two-point field goals in a single season by reaching 232. Playing for the team in 2025-26, in 54 games he averaged 22.9 minutes, 13.2 points, 5.5 rebounds, 1.2 blocks (3rd in the EuroLeague with 1.4) and 1.0 assists per game, shooting 70.5% from the floor (6th in the EuroLeague at 70.8&).

On May 3, 2026, he re-signed with Hapoel Tel Aviv.

== Career statistics ==
Legend
GP	Games played	GS	Games started	MPG	Minutes per game
FG%	Field-goal percentage	3P%	3-point field-goal percentage	FT%	Free-throw percentage
RPG	Rebounds per game	APG	Assists per game	SPG	Steals per game
BPG	Blocks per game	PPG	Points per game	PIR	Performance index rating
**Bold**	Career high

=== NBA ===
==== Regular season ====
Year	Team	GP	GS	MPG	FG%	3P%	FT%	RPG	APG	SPG	BPG	PPG
2020–21	L.A. Clippers	**30**	0	5.4	.423	**.200**	**.750**	1.6	**.3**	**.1**	.2	1.8
2021–22	Toronto	3	0	**9.0**	**.500**	.000	.600	**1.7**	.0	.0	**.7**	**3.0**
Career		33	0	5.7	.431	.167	.706	1.6	.3	.1	.3	1.9

==== Playoffs ====
Year	Team	GP	GS	MPG	FG%	3P%	FT%	RPG	APG	SPG	BPG	PPG
2021	L.A. Clippers	8	0	1.9	.400	.000	.500	.5	—	—	.1	.6
Career		8	0	1.9	.400	.000	.500	.5	—	—	.1	.6

=== EuroLeague ===
Year	Team	GP	GS	MPG	FG%	3P%	FT%	RPG	APG	SPG	BPG	PPG	PIR
2023–24	Anadolu Efes	22	3	15.5	.684	—	.585	3.9	.5	.3	.9	7.2	8.8
2024–25	Anadolu Efes	38	4	16.3	.684	—	.685	4.2	.5	.5	.9	8.8	11.1
Career		60	7	16.4	.701	—	.664	4.1	.5	.4	.9	8.5	10.7

=== Domestic leagues ===
Year	Team	League	GP	MPG	FG%	3P%	FT%	RPG	APG	SPG	BPG	PPG
2021–22	(United States) Windy City Bulls	G League	29	22.2	.573	.237	.570	7.0	.9	.5	.5	13.3
2022–23	(United States) Windy City Bulls	G League	24	17.5	.612	.125	.524	5.8	.5	.5	.5	11.2
2023–24	(Turkey) M. B. Denizli	TBSL	10	32.9	.652	—	.631	9.6	1.4	1.1	1.6	20.3
2023–24	(Turkey) Anadolu Efes	TBSL	21	25.7	.644	.000	.631	5.8	1.5	.5	1.1	15.0
2024–25	(Turkey) Anadolu Efes	TBSL	31	22.1	.698	.000	.582	5.4	1.5	.6	.9	14.5

=== College ===
Year	Team	GP	GS	MPG	FG%	3P%	FT%	RPG	APG	SPG	BPG	PPG
2018–19	Minnesota	**35**	**31**	23.8	.551	**.500**	.615	7.0	.5	**.5**	1.3	10.8
2019–20	Minnesota	31	**31**	**33.9**	**.563**	.365	**.707**	**11.3**	**1.1**	**.5**	**2.5**	**20.1**
Career		66	62	28.5	.558	.370	.671	9.0	.8	.5	1.8	15.2

== Personal life ==
Both of Oturu's parents are natives of Nigeria. His mother, Deborah, is from Ife and his father, Francis, is from Fadeyi, a suburb of Lagos. Francis played table tennis for the Nigerian national team and moved to the United States because of his table tennis career. Oturu has an older sister, Eunice. As well as a two younger siblings named David, and Priscilla.

Oturu was given his middle name, Daniel, by his mother, who viewed it as a strong biblical name. His first name, Akinfayoshe, combines the Yoruba words "Akin" (hero) and "fayoshe" (joy and happiness).

Oturu comes from a Christian family. Both of his parents are ministers at a branch of the Mountain of Fire and Miracles Ministries in Saint Paul, Minnesota. His favorite NBA player was Kobe Bryant, and he cites Joel Embiid as a role model. His hometown is Woodbury, Minnesota.
