= Austin Wiley =

American basketball player (born 1999)

- Wiley with Bayern Munich in 2026

No. 50 – Bayern Munich
- Position: Center
- League: BBL; EuroLeague

Personal information
- Born: January 8, 1999 (age 27) Birmingham, Alabama, U.S.
- Listed height: 6 ft 11 in (2.11 m)
- Listed weight: 260 lb (118 kg)

Career information
- High school: Spain Park (Hoover, Alabama); Conrad Academy (Orlando, Florida)
- College: Auburn (2016–2020)
- NBA draft: 2020: undrafted
- Playing career: 2020–present

Career history
- 2021: Riesen Ludwigsburg
- 2021–2022: Gladiators Trier
- 2022–2023: Neptūnas Klaipėda
- 2023–2024: Tofaş
- 2024–2026: Hapoel Jerusalem
- 2026–present: Bayern Munich

Career highlights
- EuroCup rebounding leader (2026); All-FIBA Champions League First Team (2024); FIBA Champions League rebounding leader (2024); Turkish League MVP (2024); Turkish League rebounding leader (2024); Lithuanian League rebounding leader (2023)
Medals
Men's basketball
Representing United States
FIBA Under-17 Basketball World Cup
Gold medal – first place	2016 Spain
FIBA Under-19 World Cup
Bronze medal – third place	2017 Egypt

Austin Jermaine Wiley (born January 8, 1999) is an American professional basketball player for Bayern Munich of the Basketball Bundesliga (BBL) and the EuroLeague. He played college basketball for the Auburn Tigers.

== High school career ==
Wiley attended Spain Park High School in Hoover, Alabama, where he averaged 27.1 points, 12.7 rebounds and 2.9 blocked shots as a junior in 2015–16.. He then moved to Florida, where he went to Calusa Preparatory School in Miami, Florida, while playing basketball at The Conrad Academy in Orlando, Florida. He signed a national letter of intent with Auburn on November 9, 2016, following in the footsteps of his parents who both are Auburn alumni. On December 16, 2016, Wiley decided to reclassify into the class of 2016 and enroll early into Auburn.

Wiley was rated as a five-star recruit and the No. 27 overall recruit and No.6 center in the 2016 high school class.

== College career ==
=== Freshman ===
Wiley made his debut for the Tigers on December 18, 2016, tallying nine points, three rebounds, and two blocks in a 76–74 win over Mercer. He finished his freshman year with averages of 8.8 points, 4.7 rebounds, and 1.4 blocks in 18 minutes per game.

=== FBI investigation ===
Before Auburn's exhibition game on November 2, 2017, the school announced that it would hold Wiley and teammate Danjel Purifoy out of games indefinitely due to eligibility concerns raised relating to an ongoing FBI investigation into the Chuck Person bribery scandal. after Auburn self-reported violations involving recruiting, extra benefits, and agent-related activity. On January 12, 2018, the NCAA ruled that Wiley would regain his eligibility in the 2018–19 season, but ruled him ineligible for the remainder of the 2017–18 season. Wiley was one of 69 players to enter the 2018 NBA Draft Combine, though he would return to Auburn to properly play for them for at least his junior season.

=== Junior ===
As a junior, Wiley averaged 6.9 points, 4.0 rebounds, and 1.3 blocks per game. He was hampered by injuries and underwent surgery after the season. However, he was a part of Auburn's first-ever Final Four team.

=== Senior ===
Coming into his senior season, Wiley was tabbed as preseason Team All-SEC by the coaches and was on the Kareem Abdul-Jabbar Award watchlist. On February 12, 2020, Wiley scored 18 points, grabbed a career-high 17 rebounds, and blocked five shots in a 95–91 overtime win over Alabama. As a senior, Wiley averaged 10.6 points and 9.3 rebounds per game, second in the conference in rebounding.

== Professional career ==
On January 2, 2021, he signed with MHP Riesen Ludwigsburg of the Basketball Bundesliga (BBL). He appeared in one league game for Ludwigsburg, in which he was scoreless.

Wiley moved to German second division side Gladiators Trier on January 20, 2021. In six league games of the 2020–21 season, he averaged 14.7 points, 8.8 rebounds, and 1.8 blocks for the Gladiators.

On July 17, 2023, he signed with Tofaş of Basketbol Süper Ligi (BSL). In 40 games of the 2023–24 season, he averaged 14.1 points, 9.6 rebounds, and 2.0 blocks .

On July 3, 2024, he signed with Hapoel Jerusalem of the Israeli Basketball Premier League. In 30 games in the 2024–25 season, he averaged 9.4 points, 8.9 rebounds, and 1.3 blocks.

== National team career ==
Wiley helped Team USA capture gold at the 2016 FIBA under-17 World Championships in Spain and bronze at the 2017 FIBA under-19 World Cup in Egypt.

== Career statistics ==
Legend
GP	Games played	GS	Games started	MPG	Minutes per game
FG%	Field goal percentage	3P%	3-point field goal percentage	FT%	Free throw percentage
RPG	Rebounds per game	APG	Assists per game	SPG	Steals per game
BPG	Blocks per game	PPG	Points per game	**Bold**	Career high

=== College ===
Year	Team	GP	GS	MPG	FG%	3P%	FT%	RPG	APG	SPG	BPG	PPG
2016–17	Auburn	23	22	18.0	**.584**	–	.491	4.7	.2	.2	1.3	8.8
2017–18	Auburn	Ineligible due to 2017 NCAA Division I men's basketball corruption scandal										
2018–19	Auburn	29	5	13.0	.567	.000	.571	4.0	.1	.2	1.3	6.9
2019–20	Auburn	**31**	**31**	**21.4**	.574	.000	**.671**	**9.3**	**.5**	**.5**	**1.6**	**10.6**
Career		83	58	17.5	.575	.000	.592	6.2	.3	.3	1.4	8.8

== Personal life ==
He is the son of Vickie Orr, a member of the 1992 US Olympic team and former All-American, and Aubrey Wiley. Both played varsity basketball at Auburn.
