= David Efianayi =

American basketball player (born 1995)

Maccabi Tel Aviv
- Position: Guard
- League: Ligat HaAl; EuroLeague

Personal information
- Born: December 19, 1995 (age 30) Manchester, Connecticut, U.S.
- Listed height: 6 ft 2 in (1.88 m)
- Listed weight: 185 lb (84 kg)

Career information
- High school: Ocoee (Ocoee, Florida)
- College: Gardner–Webb (2015–2019)
- NBA draft: 2019: undrafted
- Playing career: 2019–present

Career history
- 2019–2020: Bakken Bears
- 2020–2021: Horsens IC
- 2021–2022: Denain Voltaire Basket
- 2022–2023: Hapoel Be'er Sheva
- 2023–2024: Petkim Spor
- 2024–2025: Galatasaray Ekmas
- 2025: Mersin MSK
- 2025–2026: Petkim Spor
- 2026-present: Maccabi Tel Aviv

David Tinsley Eghosa Efianayi Jr. (born December 19, 1995) is an American basketball player for Maccabi Tel Aviv of the Israeli Basketball Premier League and the EuroLeague. He played college basketball at Gardner-Webb University.

== Early life ==
Efianayi was born in Manchester, Connecticut, and raised in Orlando, Florida, after moving there in the fifth grade. He is 6 feet 2 inches (188 cm), and weighs 185 pounds (84 kg).

He played high school basketball at Ocoee High School ('14) in Ocoee, Florida. He was named All-County Honorable Mention by the Orlando Sentinel in his junior year.

== College career ==
He played college basketball at Gardner-Webb University ('19) from 2015 to 2019. In 2017–18 he scored 17.5 points per game (3rd in the Big South), had an .807 free throw percentage (6th), and had 1.2 steals per game (10th). In 2018–19 he scored 18.2 points per game (5th in the Big South), and had 0.7 blocks per game (7th). Efianayi was named twice to the Sports Classic Indianapolis Subregional Team, All-Big South Honorable Mention Team in 2017, to the All-Big South Second Team in 2018 and 2019, to the National Association of Basketball Coaches All-District (3) Second Team in 2019, and to the Big South All-Tournament Team in 2019. In 2020, he was named to the Big South Conference Men's Basketball All-Decade Team (2010–19).

== Professional career ==
In 2019–20 Efianayi played for the Bakken Bears in Basketligaen in Denmark. In 2020–21 he played for Horsens IC in Basketligaen, averaging 20.2 points per game (second in the league). In 2021–22 he played for Denain ASC Voltaire in LNB Pro B in France.

In 2022–23 Efianayi plays guard for Hapoel Be'er Sheva in the Israeli Basketball Premier League, having signed with the team on July 5, 2022.

On June 25, 2023, he signed with Petkim Spor of the Basketbol Süper Ligi (BSL).

On June 11, 2024, he signed with Galatasaray Ekmas of the Basketbol Süper Ligi (BSL).

On January 9, 2025, he signed with Mersin MSK of the Basketbol Süper Ligi (BSL).

On July 5, 2025, he signed with Petkim Spor of the Basketbol Süper Ligi (BSL) for a second stint.

On May 16, 2026, he signed with Maccabi Tel Aviv of the Israeli Basketball Premier League and the EuroLeague.
