= Erkan Veyseloğlu =

German-born Turkish basketball player

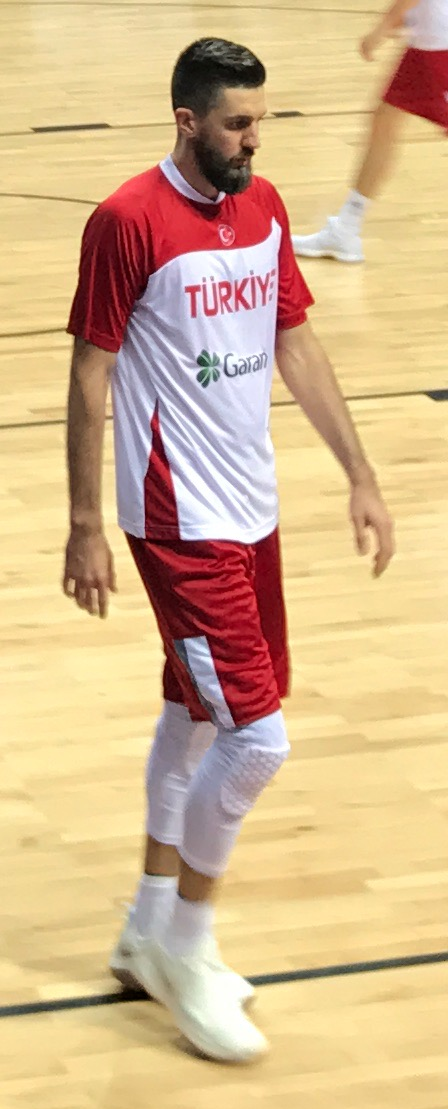

Free Agent
- Position: Small forward

Personal information
- Born: 13 March 1983 (age 43) Munich, Germany
- Listed height: 6 ft 6.75 in (2.00 m)
- Listed weight: 205 lb (93 kg)

Career information
- NBA draft: 2005: undrafted
- Playing career: 2000–present

Career history
- 2000–2001: Antbirlik Antalya
- 2001–2002: Pertevniyal
- 2002–2004: Fenerbahçe
- 2004–2005: Beşiktaş
- 2005–2006: Tuborg Pilsener
- 2006–2008: Beşiktaş
- 2008–2009: Banvit
- 2009–2011: Erdemir
- 2011–2014: Banvit
- 2015: Pınar Karşıyaka
- 2015–2016: Türk Telekom
- 2016–2019: Beşiktaş
- 2019–2021: Darüşşafaka
- 2021–2024: Çağdaş Bodrumspor
Medals
Men's basketball
Representing Turkey
Mediterranean Games
Bronze medal – third place	2009 Pescara	Team

Erkan Veyseloğlu (born 13 March 1983) is a German-born Turkish professional basketball player who last played for Çağdaş Bodrumspor of the Basketbol Süper Ligi. Standing 6 ft 7 in (2.00 m), he plays the small forward position.

== Early career ==
Born in 1983 in Munich, Germany, Veyseloğlu spent two years playing basketball for Antbirlik in Antalya, Turkey from 2000–2001.

== Professional career ==
After playing his first three professional years from 2002–2004 for the Turkish Basketball League, Veyseloğlu submitted his name for the 2005 NBA draft. After not being selected, he became an Unrestricted Free agent.

During the 2004–2005 Basketball Super League season with the Beşiktaş J.K. men's basketball team Veyseloğlu recorded an average of 6.2 points, 2.6 rebounds and 1.8 assists. While with Beşiktaş, he played games in the Basketball Champions League where he averaged 5.6 points and 2 rebounds.

He played on the Turkish national team at the EuroBasket 2017, averaging 4.3 points, 1.2 rebounds and 0.3 assists.

After eleven years Veyseloğlu returned to Beşiktaş in 2016, and played four seasons until 2019.

In 2019 he signed with Darüşşafaka Basketbol.
