= Çağdaş Bodrumspor =

- Leagues: Türkiye Basketbol Ligi
- Founded: 2021; 4 years ago
- Arena: Bodrum Spor Salonu
- Capacity: 1,000
- Location: Bodrum, Muğla, Turkey
- Team colors: Orange, blue
- President: Dağlarca Çağlar
- Head coach: Erhan Ernak
- Ownership: Çağdaş Holding
- 2023–24 position: BSL, 15th of 16
- Championships: 1 Turkish First League
- Website: Link

Çağdaş Bodrumspor, is a Turkish professional basketball club based in Bodrum. The club plays in the Basketbol Süper Ligi (BSL), the highest level of basketball in Turkey.

== History ==
At the beginning of the 2020–21 season, a group of businesspeople from Bodrum made efforts to participate in the Turkish Basketball League by purchasing the competitive rights of an existing sports club. Discussions were held with Bandırma Kırmızı and Global Connect Travel Düzce in this regard, but no result was achieved. At the beginning of the 2021–22 season, Çağdaş Bodrumspor was established solely with the capital of Çağdaş Holding, and the club started its activities by participating in the Turkish Basketball Second League.

The club, setting short-term goals of promotion to the Basketball Super League and long-term goals of participating in European tournaments, reached an agreement with Polat Kaya as the head coach, while Erkan Veyseloğlu became the club's first contracted player in its history. The team played its first match against Çorlu Belediyespor on November 7, 2021, securing a victory. However, consecutive defeats in the fourth and fifth weeks led to a change in the head coach, and Serhan Aydanarığ was appointed in December. At the end of the season, the team finished in second place and was promoted to the Turkish Basketball First League.

Before the 2022–23 season, the club made changes to its emblem, which was used during the 2021–22 season. The club also established its youth organization and reached the semi-finals in the Men's Federation Cup, which it participated in for the first time this season. They completed the same season as league champions and were promoted to the Basketball Super League.

== Players ==
=== Current roster ===
Note: Flags indicate national team eligibility at FIBA-sanctioned events. Players may hold other non-FIBA nationalities not displayed.

Çağdaş Bodrumspor roster
Players
Coaches

Pos.	No.	Nat.	Name	Ht.	Age
PG	6	(United States)	Warren, Chris	1.78 m (5 ft 10 in)	36 – 22 October 1988
SF	9	(Turkey)	Cantitiz, Fatih	1.93 m (6 ft 4 in)	33 – 31 May 1992

Head coach

- (Turkey) Erhan Ernak

Assistant coach(es)

- (Turkey) Kemal Akif Bursalı

Legend

- (C) Team captain
- Injured

- Roster
Updated: September 16, 2024

== Honours ==
Turkish Basketball First League

- Winners (1): 2022–23
