= Denizli Basket =

- Leagues: BSL; Europe Cup
- Founded: 2017
- History: Yüksekçıta Koleji 2017–2018; Merkezefendi Bld. Denizli Basket 2018–2021; Yukatel Merkezefendi Belediyesi G.S.K. 2021–2026; Yukatel Denizli Basket S.K. 2026–present
- Arena: Pamukkale University Arena
- Capacity: 5,000
- Location: Denizli, Turkey
- Team colors: Green, black
- President: Veli Deveciler
- Team manager: Evren Yenice
- Head coach: Zafer Aktaş
- Team captain: Mahir Agva
- Championships: 1 TBL; 1 TB2L
- Website: mbb.org.tr
Home	Away

Denizli Basket Spor Kulübü, also known as Yukatel Denizli Basket due to current sponsorship, is a professional basketball club based in Denizli competing in the Basketbol Süper Ligi. Their home arena is the Pamukkale University Arena with a maximum capacity of 5000 seats. In the year 2018, the club changed its name from Yüksekçıta Koleji to Merkezefendi Belediyesi Denizli Basket.

== History ==
Former logo used between (2018–2021)

In the year 2018, the club changed its name from Yüksekçıta Koleji to Merkezefendi Belediyesi Denizli Basket. With the name change came the promotion.

Merkezefendi Belediyesi Denizli Basket completed the 2018–19 regular season of the Turkish Basketball Second League undefeated in 20 games. In the first round of playoffs, Beylikdüzü Basket was defeated 2–0. The quarter finals saw them beating Boluspor, 3–0, and finally in the semi-final they defeated Erzurum BŞB Gençlik 3–1. Hence, promotion to the Turkish Basketball First League had been guaranteed. The season was not over yet, as at the final game on 13 May 2019 that was played on Sinan Erdem Dome, Merkezefendi Belediyesi Denizli Basket defeated Lokman Hekim Fethiye Belediyespor, 77–70. With this result, the team became the champion of the 2018–19 Turkish Basketball Second League and brought home their first-ever trophy.

They finished the 2020–21 season as regular-season leaders and earned the right to compete in the top tier (BSL) for the 2021–22 season onward.

The team just escaped relegation in their first-ever season at the top flight. They concluded the 21–22 season as the 14th seed. They were just one win off relegation.

Their second season saw them improve to the 13th seed.

In the 23–24 season, they were back to the 14th seed.

Their best result came in the 24–25 season as they concluded it as the 12th seed. They missed the play-ins by 2 wins.

Denizli Basket qualified to participate in the Basketball Champions League qualifying round for the 2026-27 season. They were eliminated after losing 101–98 to the Rasta Vechta in the qualifying round's final-eight stage.

== Players ==
=== Current roster ===
Note: Flags indicate national team eligibility at FIBA-sanctioned events. Players may hold other non-FIBA nationalities not displayed.

Yukatel Denizli Basket roster
Players
Coaches

Pos.	No.	Nat.	Name	Ht.	Age
PG	1	(United States)	Ivey, Brae	1.91 m (6 ft 3 in)	30 – 25 August 1996
SG	2	(United States)	Dunn, Jhonathan	1.93 m (6 ft 4 in)	28 – 17 February 1998
G	4	(Turkey)	Yılmaz, Mustafa	1.88 m (6 ft 2 in)	20 – 9 January 2006
F/C	5	(Serbia)	Pecarski, Marko	2.08 m (6 ft 10 in)	26 – 12 February 2000
SG	6	(Turkey)	Alişan, Yaman	1.98 m (6 ft 6 in)	20 – 27 June 2006
G/F	8	(United States)	Brewer, Ty	2.00 m (6 ft 7 in)	26 – 23 March 2000
SG	10	(United States)	Bailey Jr., Victor	1.93 m (6 ft 4 in)	28 – 28 September 1998
SG	11	(Turkey)	Gazi, Erten	1.91 m (6 ft 3 in)	29 – 15 June 1997
F	12	(United States)	Meeks, John	1.98 m (6 ft 6 in)	27 – 16 March 1999
C	15	(Turkey)	Güven, Egemen	2.13 m (7 ft 0 in)	30 – 25 September 1996
PF	22	(Finland)	Amzil, Mustapha	2.06 m (6 ft 9 in)	25 – 12 September 2001
PF	32	(United States)	Miles, Isaiah	2.03 m (6 ft 8 in)	32 – 9 June 1994
C	46	(Germany) (Turkey)	Agva, Mahir (C)	2.06 m (6 ft 9 in)	30 – 26 June 1996

Head coach

- (Turkey) Zafer Aktaş

Assistant coach(es)

- (Turkey) Sergey Sergen Horuz
- (Turkey) Cihan Özolcay

Strength & conditioning coach(es)

- (Turkey) Mustafa Kara

Physiotherapist(s)

- (Turkey) Ali İhsan Aktaş

Team manager

- (Turkey) Ömer Halat

Legend

- (C) Team captain
- Injured

- Roster
Updated: November 14, 2026

=== Depth chart ===
Pos.	Starting 5	Bench 1	Bench 2
C	Mahir Agva	Egemen Güven
PF	Marko Pecarski	Mustapha Amzil
SF	John Meeks	Ty Brewer
SG	Victor Bailey Jr.	Erten Gazi	Yaman Alişan
PG	Brae Ivey	Mustafa Yılmaz	Mustafa Yılmaz

== Honours ==
=== Domestic competitions ===
Turkish Basketball First League

- Winner (1): 2020–21

Turkish Basketball Second League

- Winner (1): 2018–19

== Head coaches ==
- (Turkey) Şahin Ateşdağlı (2018–2020)
- (Turkey) Zafer Aktaş (2020–present)

== Season by season ==
Season	Tier	League	Pos.	Record	Turkish Cup	European competitions
2017–18	3	T2BL	7th	13–13	—	—
2018–19	3	T2BL	1st	29–1	—	—
2019–20	2	TBL	3rd^{1}	17–7	—	—
2020–21	2	TBL	1st	22–8	—	—
2021–22	1	BSL	14th	8–22	—	—
2022–23	1	BSL	13th	11–19	—	—
2023–24	1	BSL	14th	12–18	—	—
2024–25	1	BSL	12th	11–19	—	—
2025–26	1	BSL	9th	12–18	—	—

^1 Cancelled due to the COVID-19 pandemic in Europe.

== Notable players ==
Note: Flags indicate national team eligibility at FIBA-sanctioned events. Players may hold other non-FIBA nationalities not displayed.

Criteria

To appear in this section a player must have either:

- Set a club record or won an individual award while at the club
- Played at least one official international match for their national team at any time
- Played at least one official NBA match at any time.

- (Turkey) Emircan Koşut
- (Belgium) Vrenz Bleijenbergh
- (Canada) Xavier Rathan-Mayes
- (Croatia) Roko Badžim
- (Greece) Nikos Rogkavopoulos
- (Jamaica) Jerome Jordan
- (Latvia) Rihards Lomažs
- (United States) (Israel) Max Heidegger
- (United States) (Uganda) Nike Sibande
- (United States) Manny Harris
- (United States) Andrew Harrison
- (United States) Kalin Lucas
- (United States) Daniel Oturu
- (United States) Moses Wright
