= List of basketball clubs in Turkey =

List of basketball clubs in Turkey sorted by division:

== Men's ==
=== TBL ===
Club	City
Anadolu Efes	Istanbul
Banvit	Bandırma
Beşiktaş	Istanbul
Darüşşafaka Doğuş	Istanbul
Fenerbahçe Ülker	Istanbul
Galatasaray Odeabank	Istanbul
İstanbul BB	Istanbul
Pınar Karşıyaka	İzmir
Royal Halı Gaziantep	Gaziantep
TED Ankara Kolejliler	Ankara
Torku Konyaspor	Konya
Trabzon MP	Trabzon
Türk Telekom	Ankara
Tüyap Büyükçekmece	Istanbul
Uşak Sportif	Uşak
Yeşilgiresun Belediye	Giresun

=== TB2L ===
Club	City
Acıbadem Üniversitesi	Istanbul
Adanaspor	Adana
Afyon Belediye	Afyonkarahisar
Akhisar Belediyespor	Manisa
Ankara DSİ Era	Ankara
Bandırma Kırmızı	Bandırma
Best Balıkesir	Balıkesir
Denizli Basket (dissolved 2016)	Denizli
Denizli Basket (founded 2017)	Denizli
Final Gençlik	Bursa
Eskişehir Basket	Eskişehir
Gediz Üniversitesi	İzmir
Gelişim Koleji	İzmir
İstanbul DSİ	Istanbul
Melikşah Üniversitesi	Kayseri
Mersin BB	Mersin
Pertevniyal	Istanbul
Sakarya BB	Sakarya
Socar Petkim	İzmir
Tofaş	Bursa
