= 2014–15 Turkish Basketball Second League =

TB2L
- Season: 2014–15
- Games played: 306 (Regular season)
- Teams: 18

Regular season
- Promoted: Tüyap Büyükçekmece; Yeşilgiresun Belediye
- Relegated: İ.T.Ü. Mersin BB

Finals
- Champions: Yeşilgiresun Belediye

Statistical leaders
Points	(United States) Alex Gordon	24.1
Rebounds	(United States) K'zell Wesson	12.8
Assists	(United States) Alex Gordon	8.0
- All statistics correct as of 2 June 2015.

The 2014–15 TB2L season was the 45th season of the basketball Turkish Second Division.

There are a total of 18 teams participating in the league for the season. Each team play each other in their group twice during the regular season. Two teams are promoted to Turkish Super League for the next season and the last three teams relegate to the Third League.

== Clubs and venues ==
Locations of the 2014–15 Turkish Basketball Second League Clubs

Club	Location	Foun.Year	Arena	Capacity	Head coach
Adanaspor	Adana	2006	Menderes Sports Hall	2,000	(Turkey) Cengiz Karadağ
Akhisar Belediyespor	Akhisar	2009	Akhisar Belediye Sports Hall	1,800	(Turkey) Zafer Aktaş
Ankara DSİ Era	Ankara	2011	Mamak Belediyesi Sports Hall	4,250	(Turkey) Altar Tunçkol
Afyonkarahisar Bld.	Afyon	2013	Afyon Atatürk Sports Hall	2,000	(Turkey) Deniz Atak
Best Balıkesir	Balıkesir	2004	Kurtdereli Sports Hall	2,000	(Turkey) Hakan Yavuz
Sinpaş Denizli Basket	Denizli	2006	Pamukkale University Arena	5,000	(Turkey) Okan Çevik
Final Gençlik	Bursa	2006	Final Okulları Sports Hall	1,000	(Turkey) Ali Uruk
Orkide Gediz Üniversitesi	İzmir	2010	Gediz Üniversitesi Sports Hall	250	(Turkey) İsmail Beleş
İstanbul DSİ	Istanbul	2012	Caferağa Sports Hall	1,500	(Turkey) Ali Burgul
İstanbul Teknik Üniversitesi	Istanbul	1953	İTÜ Ayazağa Sports Center	2,500	(Turkey) Serhat Şehit
Mondi Melikşah Üniversitesi	Kayseri	2013	Recep Mamur Sports Hall	500	(Turkey) Murat Aşkın
Mersin BB	Mersin	1993	Edip Buran Arena	1,750	(Turkey) Alaeddin Yakan
Gelişim Koleji	İzmir	2000	Gelişim Koleji Sports Hall	500	(Turkey) Arda Vekiloğlu
Pertevniyal	Istanbul	1968	Ahmet Cömert Sport Hall	3,500	(Croatia) Tomislav Mijatović
Sakarya BB	Sakarya	2013	Sakarya Atatürk Sports Hall	1,500	(Turkey) Mustafa Derin
Socar Petkim	İzmir	2013	Halkapınar Sport Hall	10,000	(Turkey) Şahin Ateşdağlı
Tüyap Büyükçekmece	Istanbul	2011	Mimar Sinan Koleji Sports Hall	500	(Turkey) Özhan Çıvgın
Yeşilgiresun Belediye	Giresun	2006	19 Eylül Sports Hall	3,500	(Turkey) Ahmet Kandemir

== Regular season ==
=== League table ===
Pos	Team	Pld	W	L	PF	PA	PD	Pts	Qualification or relegation
1	Sinpaş Denizli Basket	34	27	7	2673	2348	+325	61	Qualification to playoffs
2	Sakarya BB	34	25	9	2634	2428	+206	59	Qualification to playoffs
3	Best Balıkesir	34	25	9	2680	2459	+221	59	Qualification to playoffs
4	Tüyap Büyükçekmece (P)	34	23	11	2680	2518	+162	57	Qualification to playoffs
5	Akhisar Belediyespor	34	23	11	2593	2479	+114	57	Qualification to playoffs
6	Yeşilgiresun Belediye (P)	34	21	13	2625	2447	+178	55	Qualification to playoffs
7	Mondi Melikşah Üniversitesi	34	20	14	2616	2567	+49	54	Qualification to playoffs
8	Adanaspor	34	20	14	2900	2817	+83	54	Qualification to playoffs
9	Gelişim Koleji	34	19	15	2581	2536	+45	53	
10	SOCAR Petkim	34	16	18	2815	2812	+3	50	
11	Gediz Üniversitesi	34	14	20	2479	2529	−50	48	
12	Mamak Bld. Ankara DSİ Era	34	13	21	2622	2732	−110	47	
13	Final Gençlik	34	12	22	2757	2895	−138	46	
14	Pertevniyal	34	11	23	2590	2706	−116	45	
15	Afyon Belediye	34	11	23	2615	2851	−236	45	
16	İstanbul DSİ	34	10	24	2391	2610	−219	44	
17	İstanbul Teknik Üniversitesi (R)	34	9	25	2476	2792	−316	43	Relegation to TB3L
18	Mersin BB (R)	34	7	27	2416	2617	−201	41	Relegation to TB3L

Updated to match(es) played on 6 April 2015. Source: TBF
(P) Promoted; (R) Relegated

== Playoffs ==
Quarterfinals
1	Sinpaş Denizli Basket	68	72	X
8	Adanaspor	62	71	X
4	Tüyap Büyükçekmece	83	68	86
5	Akhisar Belediyespor	89	65	72
2	Sakarya BB	75	68	66
7	Mondi Melikşah Üni.	78	67	56
3	Best Balıkesir	63	58	X
6	Yeşilgiresun Belediye	77	82	X

Semifinals
1	Sinpaş Denizli Basket	59	63	73	63	X
4	Tüyap Büyükçekmece	63	67	67	83	X
2	Sakarya BB	81	78	62	83	X
6	Yeşilgiresun Belediye	82	67	75	93	X

Finals
4	Tüyap Büyükçekmece	60
6	Yeşilgiresun Belediye	75
