= 2015–16 Türkiye Basketbol Ligi =

TBL
- Season: 2015–16
- Games played: 306 (Regular season)
- Teams: 18

Regular season
- Relegated: İstanbul DSİ; Adanaspor

Finals
- Champions: Tofaş (1st title)
- Runners-up: Best Balıkesir

Statistical leaders
Points	(United States) Terrell Stoglin	27.3
Rebounds	(United States) Sean Evans	11.2
Assists	(United States) Alfrie Kelly	7.2
- All statistics correct as of 19 May 2015.

The 2015–16 TBL season is the 46th season of the Turkish Basketball First League (TBL), the second-tier level league of Turkish club basketball.

== Format and promotion and relegation ==
There are a total of 18 teams participating in the league for the season. Each team plays each other in their group twice during the regular season. The top two teams are promoted to the top-tier Turkish Super League for the next season, and the last three teams are relegated to the third-tier Turkish Basketball Second League.

== Clubs and venues ==
Locations of the 2015–16 Turkish Basketball First League Clubs

Club	Location	Foun.Year	Arena	Capacity	Head coach
Acıbadem Üniversitesi	Istanbul	2014	Acıbadem Üniversitesi Sports Hall	500	(Turkey) Alp Bayramoğlu
Adanaspor	Adana	2006	Menderes Sports Hall	2,000	(Turkey) Cengiz Karadağ
Afyonkarahisar Bld.	Afyon	2013	Afyon Atatürk Sports Hall	2,000	(Turkey) Mehmet Kabaran
Akhisar Belediyespor	Akhisar	2009	Akhisar Belediye Sports Hall	1,800	(Turkey) Serhat Yapıcı
Ankara DSİ Era	Ankara	2011	Mamak Belediyesi Sports Hall	4,250	(Turkey) Haydar Kemal Ateş
Bandırma Kırmızı	Bandırma	2005	Kara Ali Acar Sport Hall	3,000	(Turkey) Menderes Gümüşdal
Best Balıkesir	Balıkesir	2004	Kurtdereli Sports Hall	2,000	(Turkey) Mete Babaoğlu
Sinpaş Denizli Basket	Denizli	2006	Pamukkale University Arena	5,000	(Turkey) Hakan Yavuz
Eskişehir Basket	Eskişehir	2006	Anadolu Üniversitesi Sport Hall	5,000	(United States) Brad Greenberg
Final Gençlik	Bursa	2006	Final Okulları Sports Hall	1,000	(Turkey) Ali Uruk
Orkide Gediz Üniversitesi	İzmir	2010	Gediz Üniversitesi Sports Hall	250	(Turkey) Doğan Deniz
İstanbul DSİ	Istanbul	2012	Caferağa Sports Hall	1,500	(Turkey) Erkan Kaplanoğlu
Mondi Melikşah Üniversitesi	Kayseri	2013	Recep Mamur Sports Hall	500	(Turkey) Halil Atlı
Gelişim Koleji	İzmir	2000	Gelişim Koleji Sports Hall	500	(Turkey) Arda Vekiloğlu
Pertevniyal	Istanbul	1968	Ahmet Cömert Sport Hall	3,500	(Turkey) Bilal Han Duru
Sakarya BB	Sakarya	2013	Sakarya Atatürk Sports Hall	1,500	(Turkey) Okan Çevik
Socar Petkim	İzmir	2013	Halkapınar Sport Hall	10,000	(Turkey) Şahin Ateşdağlı
Tofaş	Bursa	1974	Tofaş Nilüfer Sports Hall	7,500	(Turkey) Orhun Ene

== Regular season ==
=== League table ===
Pos	Team	Pld	W	L	PF	PA	PD	Pts	Qualification or relegation
1	Tofaş (P)	34	31	3	3002	2449	+553	65	Qualification to playoffs
2	Acıbadem Üniversitesi	34	25	9	2751	2474	+277	59	Qualification to playoffs
3	Sinpaş Denizli Basket	34	24	10	2652	2445	+207	58	Qualification to playoffs
4	Gediz Üniversitesi	34	22	12	2682	2597	+85	56	Qualification to playoffs
5	Sakarya BB	34	21	13	2597	2533	+64	55	Qualification to playoffs
6	Best Balıkesir (P)	34	19	15	2729	2687	+42	53	Qualification to playoffs
7	SOCAR Petkim	34	18	16	2626	2608	+18	52	Qualification to playoffs
8	Afyon Belediye	34	17	17	2692	2689	+3	51	Qualification to playoffs
9	Pertevniyal	34	17	17	2665	2703	−38	51	
10	Gelişim Koleji	34	16	18	2653	2650	+3	50	
11	Mondi Melikşah Üniversitesi	34	14	20	2553	2552	+1	48	
12	Bandırma Kırmızı	34	14	20	2577	2721	−144	48	
13	Mamak Bld. Ankara DSİ Era	34	14	20	2626	2686	−60	48	
14	Akhisar Belediyespor	34	14	20	2627	2653	−26	48	
15	Eskişehir Basket	34	13	21	2555	2661	−106	47	
16	Final Gençlik	34	11	23	2464	2614	−150	45	
17	İstanbul DSİ (R)	34	10	24	2575	2813	−238	44	Relegation to TB3L
18	Adanaspor (R)	34	5	29	2469	2963	−494	39	Relegation to TB3L

Updated to match(es) played on 6 April 2015. Source: TBF
(P) Promoted; (R) Relegated

== Playoffs ==
Quarterfinals
1	Tofaş	105	109	93
8	Afyon Belediye	68	67	78
4	Gediz Üniversitesi	62	83	65
5	Sakarya BB	76	92	78
2	Acıbadem Üniversitesi	83	80	88
7	SOCAR Petkim	60	53	48
3	Denizli Basket (2006)	59	65	78	57
6	Best Balıkesir	87	58	88	69

Semifinals
1	Tofaş	101	82	74
5	Sakarya BB	68	80	59
2	Acıbadem Üniversitesi	58	82	81	71
6	Best Balıkesir	69	80	90	77

Finals
1	Tofaş	77
6	Best Balıkesir	71
