= 2026–27 Türkiye Basketbol Ligi =

Basketball league in Turkey

Türkiye Basketbol Ligi
- Season: 2026–27
- Dates: 12 September 2026 – May 2027
- Teams: 17

Records
- Biggest home win: Darüşşafaka 47–79 Haremspor (11 October 2026)
- Biggest away win: Haremspor 113–62 MKE Ankaragücü (12 September 2026)
- Highest scoring: Mersin Spor 89–120 Keçiören Belediyesi (14 November 2026)

The 2026–27 Türkiye Basketbol Ligi is the 58th season of the Turkish Basketball League (Turkish: Türkiye Basketbol Ligi), the second-level professional club men's basketball league in Turkey.

== Teams ==
Before the league fixture draw, Sakarya Büyükşehir Basketbol announced their withdrawal from the league.

== Regular season ==
=== League table ===
Pos	Team	Pld	W	L	PF	PA	PD	Pts	Qualification or relegation
1	Yalova Haremspor	12	10	2	989	848	+141	22	Promotion to Basketbol Süper Ligi
2	Kipaş K.B.B.	11	9	2	924	814	+110	20	Advance to playoffs
3	Göztepe Isonem	11	8	3	905	824	+81	19	Advance to playoffs
4	Mersin	11	8	3	955	899	+56	19	Advance to playoffs
5	Gaziantep Basketbol	11	8	3	872	819	+53	19	Advance to playoffs
6	Final Spor	12	7	5	971	934	+37	19	Advance to playoffs
7	OGM Ormanspor	11	6	5	921	885	+36	17	Advance to playoffs
8	Büyükçekmece Basketbol	11	6	5	898	865	+33	17	Advance to play-in
9	iLAB Basketbol	11	6	5	936	923	+13	17	Advance to play-in
10	Cedi Osman Basketbol	12	4	8	868	995	−127	16	Advance to play-in
11	Keçiören Belediyesi Bağlumspor	12	3	9	1051	1063	−12	15	Advance to play-in
12	Konya Büyükşehir Belediyespor	11	4	7	911	946	−35	15	
13	Balıkesir Büyükşehir Belediyespor	12	3	9	915	967	−52	15	
14	Darüşşafaka	11	4	7	860	923	−63	15	
15	Fenerbahçe Gelişim	11	4	7	838	908	−70	15	
16	TED Ankara Kolejliler	11	3	8	808	883	−75	14	
17	MKE Ankaragücü	11	3	8	870	996	−126	14	Relegation to TB2L

Updated to match(es) played on 22 November 2026. Source: Türkiye Basketbol Ligi

=== Results ===
Home \ Away	BAL	BÇB	PCO	DAR	FBK	FİN	GAZ	GÖZ	HAR	İLB	KÖB	KİP	KON	MER	MKA	OGM	TED
Balıkesir Büyükşehir Belediyespor	—		79–89		69–70						94–92	69–79		98–76		81–93	
Büyükçekmece Basketbol	93–77	—			85–87					83–71		70–78			89–77	83–75	
Cedi Osman Basketbol			—	81–73			62–84		69–84		76–73		59–75				63–72
Darüşşafaka	67–65	90–85		—		75–83	82–84		47–79								
Fenerbahçe Gelişim			68–81		—					73–95	86–84			77–85	82–78	70–77	
Final Spor	68–52		88–73		75–74	—						78–91		84–65			
Gaziantep Basketbol		90–70				91–89	—	65–56	70–67				93–74				
Göztepe Isonem	78–67		87–56			87–82		—			103–84	73–72					85–64
Haremspor	77–73				74–51	82–78			—	82–81		69–74			113–62		
iLAB Basketbol			98–77			84–80	76–85	85–75		—				78–81	95–92	93–91	
Keçiören Belediyesi Bağlumspor		90–88		83–91		85–89	82–68		96–99		—						90–95
Kipaş K.B.B.			114–82								85–72	—		73–85	94–69	81–75	83–72
Konya Büyükşehir Belediyespor		63–78			105–100			88–90	81–91	104–80			—				
Mersin Spor				95–82			92–70				89–120		87–82	—			100–65
MKE Ankaragücü				88–94			62–71	88–86					93–88	70–100	—	91–84	
OGM Ormanspor				92–90			89–85	73–85					93–67			—	79–59
TED Ankara Kolejliler	85–91	67–74		88–69		75–77			66–72								—

Updated to match(es) played on 22 November 2026. Source: Türkiye Basketbol Ligi
Legend: Blue = home team win; Red = away team win.
Matches with lighter background shading were decided after overtime.

== Awards ==
All official awards of the 2026–27 Türkiye Basketbol Ligi.

=== MVP of the Round ===
Gameday	Player	Team	EFF	Ref.
1	(United States) Jeremiah Tilmon	iLAB Basketbol	29	
2	(United States) Sam Sessoms	Yalova Haremspor	36	
3	(United States) Kruize Pinkins	Mersin Spor	35	
4	(Turkey) Ali Efe Barış	Final Spor	41	
5	(United States) Isaiah Washington	Göztepe Isonem	35	
6	(United States) Brandon Jefferson	Kipaş K.B.B.	30	
7	(Turkey) İnanç Hotamış	MKE Ankaragücü	37	
8	(United States) Kruize Pinkins (x2)	Mersin Spor	41	
9	(Turkey) Ömer Yasir Küçük	Konya Büyükşehir Belediyespor	33	
10	(United States) Jaquan Scott	Balıkesir Büyükşehir Belediyespor	34	
11	(United States) Robert Smith	Konya Büyükşehir Belediyespor	47	
12	(United States) Jamari Traylor	Keçiören Belediyesi Bağlumspor	38	
