= 2024–25 Basketbol Süper Ligi =

Basketball league in Turkey

Basketbol Süper Ligi
- Season: 2024–25
- Dates: 4 October 2024 – 25 June 2025
- Games played: 240 + Playoffs
- Teams: 16
- TV partner: beIN Sports

Regular season
- Top seed: Fenerbahçe Beko
- Season MVP: (United States) Marcquise Reed
- Relegated: Darüşşafaka Lassa; Yalovaspor Basketbol

Finals
- Champions: Fenerbahçe Beko (12th title)
- Runners-up: Beşiktaş Fibabanka
- Semifinalists: Anadolu Efes; Bahçeşehir Koleji
- Finals MVP: (Canada) Khem Birch

Statistical leaders
Points	(United States) Marcquise Reed	17.6
Rebounds	(United Kingdom) Gabriel Olaseni	8.5
Assists	(United States) Alex Pérez	6.4
Index Rating	(United States) Marcquise Reed	17.9

Records
- Biggest home win: Anadolu Efes 100–59 Yalovaspor (6 October 2024)
- Biggest away win: Merkezefendi 63–96 Anadolu Efes (23 December 2024)
- Highest scoring: Galatasaray 110–112 ONVO Büyükçekmece (30 March 2025)
- Winning streak: 20 games Fenerbahçe Beko
- Losing streak: 11 games Karşıyaka Basket

The 2024–25 Basketbol Süper Ligi was the 59th season of the Basketball Super League (Turkish: Basketbol Süper Ligi), the top-level professional club men's basketball league in Turkey.

Fenerbahçe Beko successfully defended their title, to get the 12th title in their history, as well as to get the first ever Triple Crown in Turkish basketball history, since they won the Turkish Cup and EuroLeague before their league championship.

== Teams ==
On April 14, 2024, Semt77 Yalovaspor was promoted to the BSL as the champion of the Turkish Basketball First League. They are back to top tier, after two years break. Mersin MSK promoted to the BSL as winners of the TBL play-offs.

Çağdaş Bodrumspor and Reeder Samsunspor were relegated after finishing in the last two spots for 2023–24 Basketbol Süper Ligi.

=== Venues ===
Locations of the 2024–25 Basketbol Süper Ligi clubs
Istanbul Basketbol Süper Ligi clubs

Team	Location	Stadium	Capacity
Anadolu Efes	Istanbul (Zeytinburnu)	Basketbol Gelişim Merkezi	10,000
Bahçeşehir Koleji	Istanbul (Bakırköy)	Sinan Erdem Spor Salonu	13,800
Beşiktaş Fibabanka	Istanbul (Beşiktaş)	Akatlar Arena	3,200
Bursaspor Yörsan	Bursa	Tofaş Nilüfer Sports Hall	7,500
Darüşşafaka Lassa	Istanbul (Maslak)	Volkswagen Arena Istanbul	5,000
Fenerbahçe Beko	Istanbul (Ataşehir)	Ülker Sports Arena	13,800
Galatasaray Basketbol	Istanbul (Zeytinburnu)	Basketbol Gelişim Merkezi	10,000
Karşıyaka Basket	İzmir (Karşıyaka)	Karşıyaka Arena	5,000
Manisa Basket Divissa	Manisa	Muradiye Spor Salonu	3,500
Mersin MSK	Mersin	Servet Tazegül Spor Salonu	7,500
ONVO Büyükçekmece	Istanbul (Büyükçekmece)	Gazanfer Bilge Spor Salonu	3,000
Petkim Spor	İzmir (Aliağa)	Aliağa Belediyesi ENKA Spor Salonu	3,000
Tofaş	Bursa	Tofaş Nilüfer Sports Hall	7,500
Türk Telekom	Ankara	Ankara Arena	10,400
Yalovaspor Basketbol	Yalova	Yalova 90. Yıl Spor Salonu	2,000
Yukatel Merkezefendi Basket	Denizli	Pamukkale University Arena	3,490

=== Personnel and sponsorship ===
Team	Head coach	Captain	Kit manufacturer	Main shirt sponsor
Anadolu Efes	(Italy) Luca Banchi	(United States) Shane Larkin	Bilcee	Coca-Cola
Bahçeşehir Koleji	(Montenegro) Dejan Radonjić	(United States) Tyler Cavanaugh	Umbro	Bahçeşehir Koleji
Beşiktaş Fibabanka	(Serbia) Dušan Alimpijević	(Turkey) Yiğit Arslan	Umbro	Fibabanka
Bursaspor Yörsan	(Turkey) Serhan Kavut	(Turkey) Ömer Utku Al	Upon	Yörsan
Darüşşafaka Lassa	(Spain) Carles Durán	(Turkey) Berkay Taşkıran	S by Sportive	Lassa
Fenerbahçe Beko	(Lithuania) Šarūnas Jasikevičius	(Turkey) Melih Mahmutoğlu	Adidas	Beko
Galatasaray Ekmas	(Turkey) Yakup Sekizkök	(Turkey) Göksenin Köksal	Puma	N/A
Karşıyaka Basket	(Turkey) Ahmet Çakı	(Turkey) Mert Celep	Kappa	N/A
Manisa Basket Divissa	(Lithuania) Kazys Maksvytis	(Turkey) Mehmet Yağmur	Kappa	N/A
Mersin MSK	(Turkey) Can Sevim	(Mexico) Francisco Cruz	New Balance	N/A
ONVO Büyükçekmece	(Turkey) Özhan Çıvgın	(Turkey) Erdi Gülaslan	Dafron	Onvo
Petkim Spor	(Turkey) Burak Gören	(United States) Peyton Aldridge	Playoff	Petkim
Tofaş	(Turkey) Orhun Ene	(Turkey) Tolga Geçim	Head	Fiat
Türk Telekom	(Turkey) Erdem Can	(Turkey) İsmet Akpınar	S by Sportive	Türk Telekom
Yalovaspor Basketbol	(Turkey) Candost Volkan	(Turkey) Melih Kapucu	Kelme	N/A
Yukatel Merkezefendi Basket	(Turkey) Zafer Aktaş	(United States) Ben McLemore	Geges	Yukatel

=== Head coaching changes ===
Team	Outgoing manager	Manner of departure	Date of vacancy	Position in table	Replaced with	Date of appointment
Darüşşafaka Lassa	(Turkey) Rüçhan Tamsöz	Mutual consent	29 May 2024	Pre-season	(United States) Josh King	30 May 2024
Türk Telekom	(Turkey) Selçuk Ernak	Mutual consent	4 June 2024	Pre-season	(Turkey) Erdem Can	4 June 2024
Manisa Basket	(Turkey) Hakan Demir	Mutual consent	4 June 2024	Pre-season	(Turkey) Ozan Bulkaz	10 June 2024
Manisa Basket	(Turkey) Ozan Bulkaz	Role Change to Player; Development Coordinator	26 September 2024	Pre-season	(Turkey) Ertuğ Tuzcukaya	27 September 2024
Darüşşafaka Lassa	(United States) Josh King	Mutual consent	21 October 2024	13th (1–1)	(Spain) Carles Durán	26 October 2024
Manisa Basket	(Turkey) Ertuğ Tuzcukaya	Mutual consent	12 November 2024	16th (0–5)	(Lithuania) Kazys Maksvytis	8 November 2024
Anadolu Efes	(Croatia) Tomislav Mijatović	Role Change to Assistant Coach	7 January 2025	2nd (10–3)	(Italy) Luca Banchi	7 January 2025
Karşıyaka Basket	(Turkey) Ufuk Sarıca	Mutual consent	8 January 2025	6th (8–5)	(Turkey) Ahmet Çakı	28 March 2025
Yalovaspor Basketbol	(Turkey) Hakan Yavuz	Mutual consent	3 March 2025	15th (4–15)	(Turkey) Candost Volkan	21 March 2025
Darüşşafaka Lassa	(Spain) Carles Durán	Mutual consent	7 May 2025	14th (9–19)	(Turkey) Erdi Özten	7 May 2025

== Regular season ==
=== League table ===
Pos	Team	Pld	W	L	PF	PA	PD	Pts	Qualification or relegation
1	Fenerbahçe Beko (C)	30	27	3	2650	2393	+257	57	Advance to playoffs
2	Beşiktaş Fibabanka	30	23	7	2697	2453	+244	53	Advance to playoffs
3	Anadolu Efes	30	23	7	2702	2369	+333	53	Advance to playoffs
4	Tofaş	30	19	11	2645	2575	+70	49	Advance to playoffs
5	Bahçeşehir Koleji	30	18	12	2501	2383	+118	48	Advance to playoffs
6	Mersin MSK	30	16	14	2484	2551	−67	46	Advance to playoffs
7	Galatasaray	30	14	16	2575	2594	−19	44	Advanced to play-in
8	ONVO Büyükçekmece	30	13	17	2552	2566	−14	43	Advanced to play-in
9	Bursaspor Yörsan	30	13	17	2568	2689	−121	43	Advanced to play-in
10	Türk Telekom	30	13	17	2484	2499	−15	43	Advanced to play-in
11	Petkim Spor	30	12	18	2473	2526	−53	42	
12	Yukatel Merkezefendi Basket	30	11	19	2469	2622	−153	41	
13	Manisa Basket Divissa	30	11	19	2632	2667	−35	41	
14	Karşıyaka Basket	30	11	19	2509	2618	−109	41	
15	Darüşşafaka Lassa (R)	30	9	21	2473	2649	−176	39	Relegation to TBL
16	Yalovaspor Basketbol (R)	30	7	23	2413	2673	−260	37	Relegation to TBL

Source: Basketbol Süper Ligi
(C) Champions; (R) Relegated

=== Positions by round ===
Team ╲ Round	1	2	3	4	5	6	7	8	9	10	11	12	13	14	15	16	17	18	19	20	21	22	23	24	25	26	27	28	29	30
Fenerbahçe Beko	4	3	2	2	3	3	3	3	2	1	1	1	1	1	1	1	1	1	1	1	1	1	1	1	1	1	1	1	1	1
Beşiktaş Fibabanka	10	8	6	4	4	6	5	5	5	5	6	6	5	5	5	4	4	3	2	2	2	2	2	2	2	2	2	2	2	2
Anadolu Efes	1	1	1	1	1	1	2	2	3	3	3	2	2	2	3	3	3	2	4	3	3	4	3	3	3	3	3	3	3	3
Tofaş	7	4	3	3	2	2	1	1	1	2	2	3	4	3	2	2	2	4	3	4	4	3	4	4	4	4	4	4	4	4
Bahçeşehir Koleji	3	6	9	8	8	8	8	7	7	7	7	7	7	7	6	6	7	7	7	7	6	5	7	5	5	5	5	5	5	5
Mersin MSK	5	2	8	5	9	10	11	11	10	9	9	9	9	8	8	7	6	6	6	6	7	7	6	7	7	7	8	7	6	6
Galatasaray Basketbol	9	13	10	9	10	9	7	6	6	6	5	4	3	4	4	5	5	5	5	5	5	6	5	6	6	6	6	6	7	7
ONVO Büyükçekmece	13	9	11	12	12	12	12	13	14	12	12	12	12	12	12	12	12	12	11	9	9	10	9	8	8	8	7	8	8	8
Bursaspor Yörsan	6	11	12	11	11	11	9	9	8	8	8	8	8	9	10	11	11	11	8	8	8	8	8	9	11	11	10	10	9	9
Türk Telekom	8	10	7	10	5	4	6	8	9	10	10	10	10	10	11	10	10	8	9	10	10	9	10	10	9	9	9	9	10	10
Petkim Spor	2	5	5	7	7	7	10	10	11	11	11	11	11	11	9	9	9	10	10	11	11	11	14	11	12	13	13	11	11	11
Yukatel Merkezefendi Basket	12	15	15	15	13	13	14	15	12	14	15	16	16	16	16	16	16	16	16	15	15	15	15	15	15	14	11	12	12	12
Manisa Basket Divissa	11	14	14	15	15	16	13	14	15	13	13	13	13	13	15	15	15	14	14	14	14	14	13	14	14	15	15	14	14	13
Karşıyaka Basket	14	7	4	6	6	5	4	4	4	4	4	5	6	6	7	8	8	9	12	12	12	12	11	12	10	10	12	13	13	14
Darüşşafaka Lassa	15	12	13	13	14	15	16	12	13	15	16	15	15	14	13	13	13	13	13	13	13	13	12	13	13	12	14	15	15	15
Yalovaspor Basketbol	16	16	16	16	16	14	15	16	16	16	14	14	14	15	14	14	14	15	15	16	16	16	16	16	16	16	16	16	16	16

Leader
Advance to the playoffs
Advance to the play-in
Relegated

Source: Basketbol Süper Ligi

=== Results ===
Home \ Away	AEF	BAH	BJK	BUR	DSK	FEN	GAL	KSK	MBB	MSK	BÇB	PET	TOF	TTA	YAL	MEB
Anadolu Efes	—	93–80	90–87	83–68	95–72	81–82	99–87	99–96	85–73	102–83	76–65	101–103	97–72	86–81	100–59	97–100
Bahçeşehir Koleji	82–85	—	85–90	92–67	84–73	70–82	80–86	82–68	59–60	86–71	76–70	77–75	85–78	79–74	83–82	112–76
Beşiktaş Fibabanka	87–70	82–78	—	86–95	88–77	72–62	92–77	89–82	82–80	72–66	95–84	88–80	95–70	96–88	103–82	102–77
Bursaspor Yörsan	78–99	92–80	91–121	—	98–82	97–98	82–105	70–76	80–96	85–97	68–89	85–111	98–93	94–90	104–93	98–90
Darüşşafaka Lassa	67–83	84–88	76–91	85–81	—	87–97	94–87	84–75	94–86	89–81	82–85	83–64	78–87	89–71	77–84	88–68
Fenerbahçe Beko	86–72	95–80	90–79	95–78	91–75	—	94–70	78–67	77–73	101–93	97–85	66–75	90–88	94–85	100–94	91–72
Galatasaray Basketbol	53–87	87–84	91–88	95–89	100–82	81–95	—	101–80	115–105	101–82	110–112	81–86	76–80	73–78	79–69	84–78
Karşıyaka Basket	77–95	65–80	79–93	82–78	101–86	90–101	94–81	—	103–91	107–81	83–94	93–90	81–93	76–73	104–81	105–88
Manisa Basket Divissa	72–83	90–109	94–88	73–81	86–96	82–90	94–75	100–79	—	105–100	87–98	67–74	106–109	87–89	107–89	80–75
Mersin MSK	76–94	74–73	93–99	89–82	105–89	69–98	89–73	94–87	97–88	—	63–66	67–57	79–58	95–73	78–73	111–108
ONVO Büyükçekmece	91–89	102–93	88–89	84–87	89–86	73–78	65–76	75–82	84–107	96–97	—	67–72	88–83	99–88	89–91	81–89
Petkim Spor	79–85	88–92	73–96	86–95	108–85	75–88	77–94	83–82	80–89	77–85	83–82	—	88–95	68–75	93–65	82–78
Tofaş	77–70	75–86	99–95	94–71	111–93	88–89	88–83	90–76	98–106	87–65	93–86	107–99	—	93–82	105–90	91–80
Türk Telekom	90–100	59–79	93–75	76–93	105–68	73–85	72–70	95–73	80–85	94–80	101–105	85–75	86–72	—	82–64	64–78
Yalovaspor Basketbol	83–110	88–89	71–91	75–95	75–70	90–97	81–88	78–75	79–74	93–60	65–85	78–87	65–77	93–96	—	90–76
Yukatel Merkezefendi Basket	63–96	72–78	72–86	74–88	85–82	79–63	98–96	95–71	92–78	65–75	80–75	95–85	92–94	75–86	99–93	—

Source: Basketbol Süper Ligi
Legend: Blue = home team win; Red = away team win.
Matches with lighter background shading were decided after overtime.

== Play-in ==
Under the new format, the 7th to 10th-ranked teams faced each other in the play-in. Each game is hosted by the team with the higher regular season record. The format was similar to the first two rounds of the Page–McIntyre system for a four-team playoff that was identical to that of the NBA play-in tournament. First, the 7th seed will host the 8th seed, with the winner advancing to the playoffs as the 7th seed; likewise the 9th seed will host the 10th seed, with the loser eliminated. Then the loser of the 7-v-8 game will host the winner of the 9-v-10 game, with the winner of that game getting the final playoff spot, as the 8th seed.

Play-in games
7	Galatasaray	94
8	ONVO Büyükçekmece	90
9	Bursaspor Yörsan	70
10	Türk Telekom	74

No. 8 seed game
8	ONVO Büyükçekmece	73
10	Türk Telekom	84

Final seeds
Galatasaray	No. 7 seed
Türk Telekom	No. 8 seed

== Playoffs ==
Quarterfinals was played best-of-three format (1–1–1), semifinals was played in a best-of-five format (2–2–1) and finals was played in a best-of-seven format (2–2–1–1–1)

=== Bracket ===
Quarterfinals
1	Fenerbahçe Beko	2
8	Türk Telekom	1
4	Tofaş	1
5	Bahçeşehir Koleji	2
2	Beşiktaş Fibabanka	2
7	Galatasaray	0
3	Anadolu Efes	2
6	Mersin MSK	0

Semifinals
1	Fenerbahçe Beko	3
5	Bahçeşehir Koleji	0
2	Beşiktaş Fibabanka	3
3	Anadolu Efes	2

Finals
1	Fenerbahçe Beko	4
2	Beşiktaş Fibabanka	1

=== Quarterfinals ===
Team 1	Series	Team 2	Game 1	Game 2	Game 3
Fenerbahçe Beko	2–1	Türk Telekom	89–68	77–85	101–94
Beşiktaş Fibabanka	2–0	Galatasaray	91–75	107–85	—
Anadolu Efes	2–0	Mersin MSK	92–71	84–81	—
Tofaş	1–2	Bahçeşehir Koleji	94–80	65–75	92–96

=== Semifinals ===
Team 1	Series	Team 2	Game 1	Game 2	Game 3	Game 4	Game 5
Fenerbahçe Beko	3–0	Bahçeşehir Koleji	93–76	91–89	93–84	—	—
Beşiktaş Fibabanka	3–2	Anadolu Efes	87–90	97–70	87–94	75–64	82–75

=== Finals ===
Team 1	Series	Team 2	Game 1	Game 2	Game 3	Game 4	Game 5	Game 6	Game 7
Fenerbahçe Beko	4–1	Beşiktaş Fibabanka	94–76	84–76	77–98	91–87	84–68	—	—

== Statistical leaders ==
=== Efficiency ===
Pos	Player	Club	PIR
1	(United States) Marcquise Reed	Tofaş	17.93
2	(South Sudan) Jo Lual-Acuil	Manisa Basket Divissa	17.90
3	(United Kingdom) Gabriel Olaseni	Mersin MSK	17.40
4	(United States) Omari Moore	Darüşşafaka Lassa	17.17
5	(United States) Tres Tinkle	Darüşşafaka Lassa	17.00

=== Points ===
Pos	Player	Club	PPG
1	(United States) Marcquise Reed	Tofaş	17.64
2	(Netherlands) Yannick Franke	ONVO Büyükçekmece	17.52
3	(South Sudan) Jo Lual-Acuil	Manisa Basket Divissa	17.24
4	(United States) Jermaine Love	ONVO Büyükçekmece	17.07
5	(France) Hugo Besson	Manisa Basket Divissa	16.55

=== Rebounds ===
Pos	Player	Club	RPG
1	(United Kingdom) Gabriel Olaseni	Mersin MSK	8.57
2	(Dominican Republic) Ángel Delgado	Galatasaray	7.81
3	(United States) Donte Grantham	Bursaspor Yörsan	7.60
4	(South Sudan) Jo Lual-Acuil	Manisa Basket Divissa	6.95
5	(United States) Tyler Cook	Yukatel Merkezefendi	6.79

=== Assists ===
Pos	Player	Club	APG
1	(Mexico) Alex Pérez	Tofaş	6.38
2	(United States) Chris Chiozza	Manisa Basket Divissa	5.92
3	(United States) Stefan Moody	Yukatel Merkezefendi	5.75
4	(Montenegro) Justin Cobbs	Mersin MSK	5.63
5	(United States) Omari Moore	Darüşşafaka Lassa	5.47

Source: Basketbol Süper Ligi

== Awards ==
All official awards of the 2024–25 Basketbol Süper Ligi.

=== Season awards ===
Award	Player	Team	Ref.
Regular Season MVP	(United States) Marcquise Reed	Tofaş	
Finals MVP	(Canada) Khem Birch	Fenerbahçe Beko	

=== MVP of the Month ===
Month	Player	Team	EFF	Ref.
2024
October	(United States) Marcquise Reed	Tofaş	20.25	
November	(United States) Damien Jefferson	Karşıyaka Basket	21.00	
December	(United States) James Palmer	Galatasaray	20.75	
2025
January	(United Kingdom) Gabriel Olaseni	Mersin MSK	21.00	
March	(Belgium) Vrenz Bleijenbergh	Yukatel Merkezefendi	28.20	
April	(Turkey) Muhsin Yaşar	Karşıyaka Basket	25.60	

=== MVP of the Round ===
Gameday	Player	Team	EFF	Ref.
1	(France) David Michineau	Bursaspor Basketbol	30	
2	(United States) James Webb III	Karşıyaka Basket	30	
3	(Mexico) Alex Pérez	Tofaş	31	
4	(United States) (Nigeria) Jordan Nwora	Anadolu Efes	36	
5	(Turkey) Şehmus Hazer	Bahçeşehir Koleji	31	
6	(United States) Otis Livingston II	Galatasaray	30	
7	(France) Hugo Besson	Manisa Basket	36	
8	(United States) Kris Bankston	Tofaş	32	
9	(United States) Errick McCollum	Karşıyaka Basket	33	
10	(United States) James Palmer	Galatasaray	34	
11	(United States) Will Cummings	Galatasaray	34	
12	(United States) Saben Lee	Manisa Basket	32	
13	(United States) Kelan Martin	Beşiktaş Fibabanka	34	
14	(United States) Markel Starks	ONVO Büyükçekmece	35	
15	(United States) Bryson Williams	Petkim Spor	32	
16	(Puerto Rico) Isaiah Piñeiro	Mersin MSK	34	
17	(United States) Omari Moore	Darüşşafaka Lassa	35	
18	(United States) James Palmer (x2)	Galatasaray	33	
19	(United States) Jermaine Love	ONVO Büyükçekmece	32	
20	(United States) Dustin Sleva	Beşiktaş Fibabanka	29	
21	(Belgium) Vrenz Bleijenbergh	Yukatel Merkezefendi	36	
22	(Mexico) Alex Pérez (x2)	Tofaş	32	
23	(South Sudan) Jo Lual-Acuil	Manisa Basket Divissa	41	
24	(Turkey) Berk Uğurlu	Beşiktaş Fibabanka	30	
25	(Turkey) Muhsin Yaşar	Karşıyaka Basket	32	
26	(United States) Stefan Moody	Yukatel Merkezefendi	32	
27	(Croatia) Jaleen Smith	Bahçeşehir Koleji	31	
28	(United States) C.J. Massinburg	Bahçeşehir Koleji	30	
29	(South Sudan) Jo Lual-Acuil	Manisa Basket Divissa	36	
30	(Canada) Kyle Alexander	Türk Telekom	33	

== Turkish clubs in European competitions ==
Team	Competition	Progress
Anadolu Efes	EuroLeague	Playoffs
Fenerbahçe Beko	EuroLeague	Champions
Bahçeşehir Koleji	EuroCup	Semifinals
Beşiktaş Fibabanka	EuroCup	Eighthfinals
Türk Telekom	EuroCup	Quarterfinals
Galatasaray Basketbol	Champions League	Runners-up
Karşıyaka Basket	Champions League	Play-ins
Manisa Basket Divissa	Champions League	Round of 16
Petkim Spor	Champions League	Round of 16
Bursaspor Yörsan	FIBA Europe Cup	Regular Season
Tofaş	FIBA Europe Cup	Quarterfinals
