= Doğan Şenli =

Turkish basketball player (born 1992)

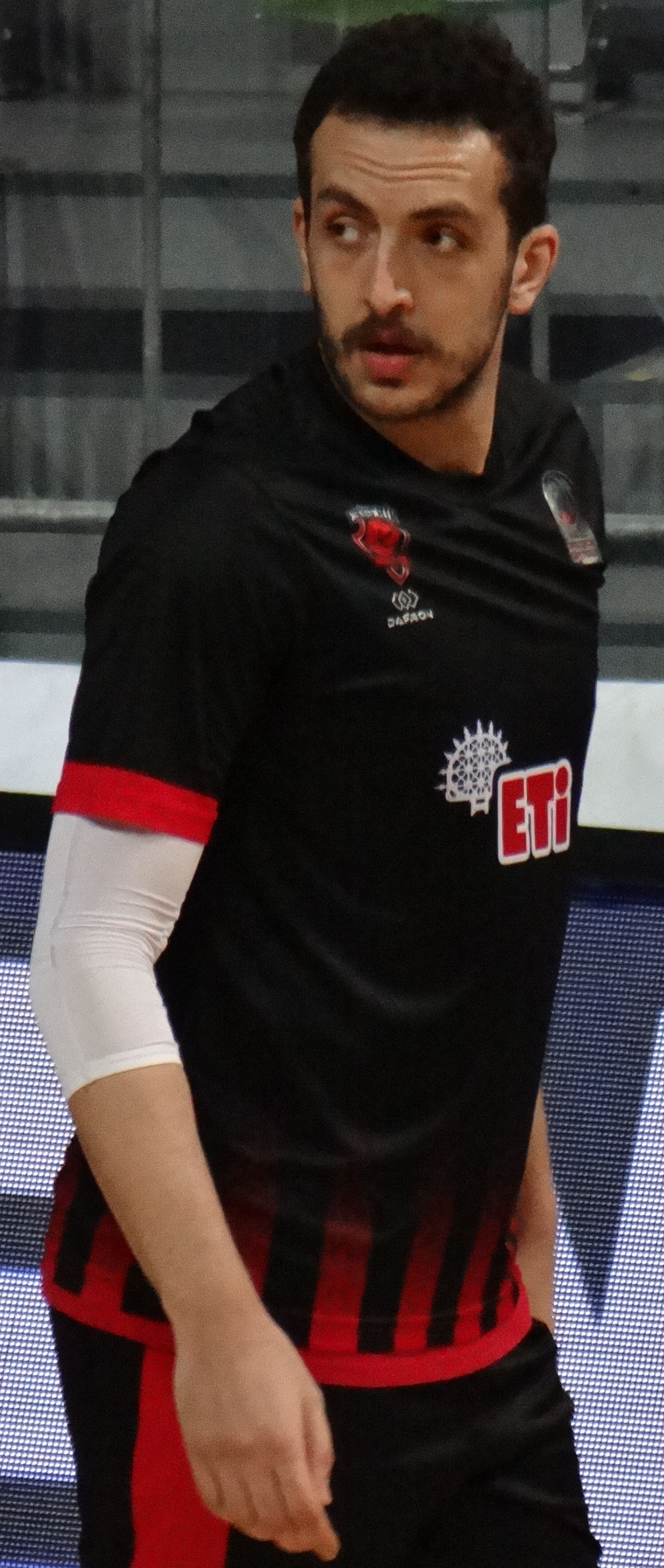

No. 65 – Konya BB
- Position: Center
- League: TBL

Personal information
- Born: July 16, 1992 (age 34) Van, Turkey
- Listed height: 2.05 m (6 ft 9 in)
- Listed weight: 98 kg (216 lb)

Career information
- Playing career: 2010–present

Career history
- 2010–2014: Tofaş
- 2014–2017: Beşiktaş
- 2017–2018: Eskişehir Basket
- 2018–2019: Gaziantep Basketbol
- 2019–2020: Bahçeşehir Koleji
- 2020–2021: Gaziantep Basketbol
- 2021–2022: Semt77 Yalovaspor
- 2022–2023: Merkezefendi Bld. Denizli Basket
- 2023–2024: Samsunspor
- 2024–2025: Trabzonspor
- 2025–2026: Büyükçekmece Basketbol
- 2026–present: Konya BB

Career highlights
- Türkiye Basketbol Ligi champion (2025)

Muhammed Doğan Şenli (born July 16, 1992) is a Turkish professional basketball player for Konya BB of the Türkiye Basketbol Ligi (TBL). He plays as a center.

== Professional career ==
Senli spent the 2019-20 season with Bahçeşehir Koleji.

On October 7, 2020, he signed with Gaziantep Basketbol.

On July 31, 2021, he has signed with Semt77 Yalovaspor of the Turkish Basketbol Süper Ligi.

On July 6, 2022, he has signed with Merkezefendi Belediyesi Denizli Basket of the Basketbol Süper Ligi.

On July 7, 2023, he has signed with Samsunspor of the Basketbol Süper Ligi.

On September 12, 2024, he signed with Trabzonspor of the Türkiye Basketbol Ligi (TBL).

On August 21, 2025, he signed with ONVO Büyükçekmece of the Basketbol Süper Ligi (BSL).

On October 19, 2026, he signed with Konya BB of the Türkiye Basketbol Ligi (TBL).
