= 2012–13 Turkish Basketball Second League =

In the 2012–13 season of the basketball Turkish 2nd Division (TB2L), Uşak Sportif finished on top of the regular season league standings, but in the playoffs between the top 8 teams, Trabzonspor Basketball won the championship.

== Regular season ==
=== League table ===
Pos	Club	Pld	W	L	PF	PA	Avg	Pts	Qualification or Relegation
1	Mackolik.com Uşak Univ.	34	26	8	2663	2407	1.1063	60	Qualified for the Playoffs
2	Torku Selçuk Üniversitesi	34	24	10	2687	2375	1.1313	58	Qualified for the Playoffs
3	Yeşilgiresun Belediye	34	24	10	2680	2506	1.0694	58	Qualified for the Playoffs
4	Akhisar Belediyespor	34	22	12	2569	2435	1.0550	56	Qualified for the Playoffs
5	Maliye Milli Piyango	34	22	12	2875	2779	1.0345	56	Qualified for the Playoffs
6	Darüşşafaka	34	21	13	2686	2495	1.0765	55	Qualified for the Playoffs
7	Trabzonspor Basketball	34	21	13	2515	2348	1.0711	55	Qualified for the Playoffs
8	Best Balıkesir Basketbol	34	19	15	2375	2389	0.9941	53	Qualified for the Playoffs
9	Bandırma Kırmızı	34	17	17	2429	2410	1.0078	51	
10	Vestel	34	17	17	2558	2510	1.0191	51	
11	İstanbul BŞB.	34	15	19	2577	2655	0.9706	49	
12	Pİ Koleji	34	15	19	2574	2690	0.9568	49	
13	Final Gençlik	34	15	19	2626	2701	0.9722	49	
14	Başkent Gençlik	34	14	20	2419	2520	0.9599	48	
15	Gelişim Koleji	34	13	21	2512	2554	0.9835	47	
16	Pertevniyal	34	13	21	2493	2525	0.9873	47	Relegation to TB3L
17	İstanbulspor	34	5	29	2110	2536	0.8320	38	Relegation to TB3L
18	İzmir BŞB	34	3	31	2294	2807	0.8172	37	Relegation to TB3L

== Playoffs ==
Quarter-finals
1	Mackolik.Com Uşak Üniv.	2
8	Best Balıkesir Basketbol	1
4	Akhisar Belediyespor	2
5	Maliye Milli Piyango	0
2	Torku Selçuk Üniv.	0
7	Trabzonspor Basketball	2
3	Yeşilgiresun Belediye	2
6	Darüşşafaka	1

Semi-finals
1	Mackolik.Com Uşak Üniv.	2
4	Akhisar Belediyespor	0
7	Trabzonspor Basketball	2
3	Yeşilgiresun Belediye	1

Finals
1	Mackolik.Com Uşak Üniv.	66
7	Trabzonspor Basketball	71
