= Daniel Miller (basketball) =

American basketball player (born 1991)

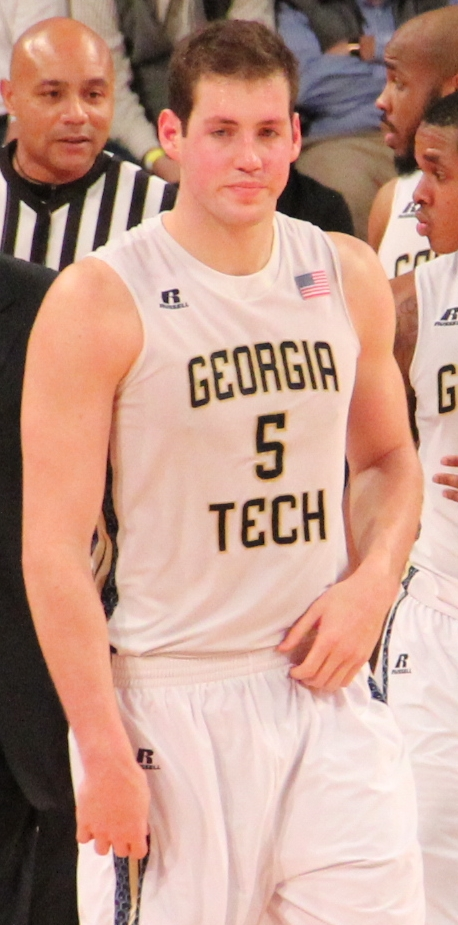
- Miller in 2014

Personal information
- Born: July 1, 1991 (age 35) Denver, Colorado, U.S.
- Listed height: 6 ft 11 in (2.11 m)
- Listed weight: 275 lb (125 kg)

Career information
- High school: Loganville Christian Academy (Loganville, Georgia)
- College: Georgia Tech (2010–2014)
- NBA draft: 2014: undrafted
- Playing career: 2014–2022
- Position: Center
- Number: 5

Career history
- 2014–2015: Río Natura Monbús
- 2015: Akhisar Belediyespor
- 2016: Taranaki Mountainairs
- 2016–2018: Levanga Hokkaido
- 2018–2021: Sendai 89ers
- 2021–2022: Levanga Hokkaido

Career highlights
- Third-team All-ACC (2014); 2× ACC All-Defensive team (2013, 2014)

Daniel Clayton Miller (born July 1, 1991) is an American former professional basketball player. Standing 6 ft 11 in (2.11 m), Miller played the center position. He played college basketball for the Georgia Tech Yellow Jackets.

== College career ==
A 6'11" center from Loganville Christian Academy in Loganville, Georgia, Miller came to Georgia Tech in 2010 after originally committing to the University of Georgia. Known for his defensive prowess, Miller earned Atlantic Coast Conference All-Defensive Team honors as a junior and senior, and led the conference in blocked shots both seasons. He was also named third-team All-ACC by the league's media in 2013–14. In 126 games over four years playing for the Yellow Jackets, Miller averaged 8.0 points, 6.5 rebounds, 1.5 assists, 1.0 steals and 2.3 blocks per game.

== Professional career ==
After going undrafted in the 2014 NBA draft, Miller joined the Washington Wizards for the 2014 NBA Summer League. On August 10, 2014, he signed with Río Natura Monbús Obradoiro of Spain for the 2014–15 ACB season. In 33 games for Obradoiro, he averaged 3.6 points and 2.7 rebounds per game.

On August 5, 2015, Miller signed with Akhisar Belediyespor of Turkey for the 2015–16 TBL season. He left the club in late December 2015 after appearing in 13 games. Over that time, he averaged 10.9 points, 7.1 rebounds, 1.1 assists and 1.6 blocks per game.

On February 25, 2016, Miller signed with the Taranaki Mountainairs for the 2016 New Zealand NBL season. He helped the Mountainairs have their best season since 2008, with their 8–10 record finishing just one win shy of a playoff berth. Miller appeared in all 18 games for the team, averaging 13.9 points, 10.6 rebounds, 2.4 assists, 1.1 steals and a league-leading 1.9 blocks per game.

In August 2016, Miller signed with the Levanga Hokkaido of the Japanese B.League.

== Career statistics ==
Legend
GP	Games played	GS	Games started	MPG	Minutes per game
FG%	Field goal percentage	3P%	3-point field goal percentage	FT%	Free throw percentage
RPG	Rebounds per game	APG	Assists per game	SPG	Steals per game
BPG	Blocks per game	PPG	Points per game	**Bold**	Career high

Year	Team	GP	GS	MPG	FG%	3P%	FT%	RPG	APG	SPG	BPG	PPG
2016–17	Hokkaido	60	59	29.5	.522	.000	.737	8.5	1.6	1.2	1.6	13.8
2017–18	Hokkaido	60	28	21.5	.590	.000	.671	6.6	1.5	.8	1.1	9.9
