= Talat Alp Altunbey =

Turkish basketball player (born 1994)

No. 13 – Afyon Belediye
- Position: Power forward
- League: Turkish Basketball League

Personal information
- Born: May 5, 1994 (age 32) Adana, Turkey
- Listed height: 6 ft 9 in (2.06 m)
- Listed weight: 212 lb (96 kg)

Career information
- Playing career: 2009–present

Career history
- 2009–2013: Bandırma Kırmızı
- 2013–2017: Banvit
- 2017-present: Afyon Belediye

Career highlights
- Turkish Cup champion (2017)
Medals
Men's basketball
Representing Turkey
FIBA Europe Under-20 Championship
Gold medal – first place	2014 Greece	U-20 Team
FIBA Europe Under-18 Championship
Bronze medal – third place	2011 Poland	U-18 Team
FIBA Europe Under-16 Championship
Bronze medal – third place	2010 Montenegro	U-16 Team

Talat Alp Altunbey (born May 5, 1994) is a Turkish professional basketball player who plays as a power forward for Afyon Belediye of the Turkish Basketball League (BSL).

== Professional career ==
Altunbey was born in Adana. He started playing basketball in Adana Tofaş Çağ Spor Kulübü. He moved to Banvit in 2009. He was loaned to TB2L team Bandırma Kırmızı which is the pilot club of Banvit. He played first TBL season in 2011–2012, with Bandırma Kırmızı. In 2013, he moved to Banvit first team but he continued to playing with Bandırma Kırmızı until 2014 via dual licence.
