= Lennard Freeman =

American basketball player

No. 5 – Anwil Włocławek
- Position: Power forward / center
- League: Polish Basketball League

Personal information
- Born: December 10, 1995 (age 30) Washington, D.C., U.S.
- Listed height: 6 ft 8 in (2.03 m)
- Listed weight: 255 lb (116 kg)

Career information
- High school: Theodore Roosevelt (Washington, D.C.); St. John's College HS (Washington, D.C.); Oak Hill Academy (Mouth of Wilson, Virginia)
- College: NC State (2013–2018)
- NBA draft: 2018: undrafted
- Playing career: 2018–present

Career history
- 2018–2019: Final Gençlik
- 2019–2020: Belfius Mons-Hainaut
- 2020–2021: Hapoel Haifa
- 2021–2023: Wonju DB Promy
- 2023–2024: CSM Oradea
- 2024–2025: Hapoel Galil Elyon
- 2025–2026: Maccabi Ra'anana
- 2026–present: Anwil Włocławek

Lennard Freeman (born December 10, 1995), nicknamed "Mr. Feathery", is an American professional basketball player for Anwil Włocławek of the Polish Basketball League (PLK). He played college basketball for the NC State Wolfpack.

== Personal life ==
Freeman was born in Washington, DC, and lived in Mouth of Wilson, Virginia. His mother is Nicole Bunn, and he has younger twin siblings Makala and Makhi. He is 6 ft 8 in (203 cm) tall, and weighs 264 pounds (120 kg).

== Basketball career ==
Freeman attended Theodore Roosevelt High School in Washington, D.C., his freshman year. He then played two seasons at St. John's College High School in Maryland, earning all-conference honors in 2012. He then attended Oak Hill Academy in Virginia, averaging 8.6 points and 9.8 rebounds in 2012–13.

Freeman attended North Carolina State University ('18), playing basketball for the team for four seasons. He missed the 2016–17 season due to a lower right leg injury.

In the 2018–19 season he played at Final Gençlik of the Turkish Basketball First League where in 28 games he recorded 16.1 points per game, 10.7 rebounds per game (#3 in the league), 1.1 assists per game, and 1.3 steals per game. Freeman was named League Player of the Week.

In the 2019–20 season Freeman played at Belfius Mons-Hainaut in the Belgian Euromillions League. In 17 games he had 12.1 points per game and 8.6 rebounds per game (#2 in the league). He was voted Eurobasket.com All-Belgian League Defensive Player of the Year, and named to the 1st Team and to the All-Star Game.

Hapoel Haifa in the Israeli Basketball Premier League signed Freeman in June 2020. He averaged 10.5 points, 8.4 rebounds, and 1.0 assist per game. In 2020–21 he was third in the Israel Basketball Premier League in two-point field goal percentage (68.7 per cent).

Freeman signed with Wonju DB Promy in the Korean Basketball League on September 16, 2021.

He signed with CSM Oradea in the Romanian Liga Națională in August, 2023.
