= Tyrece Radford =

American basketball player (born 1999)

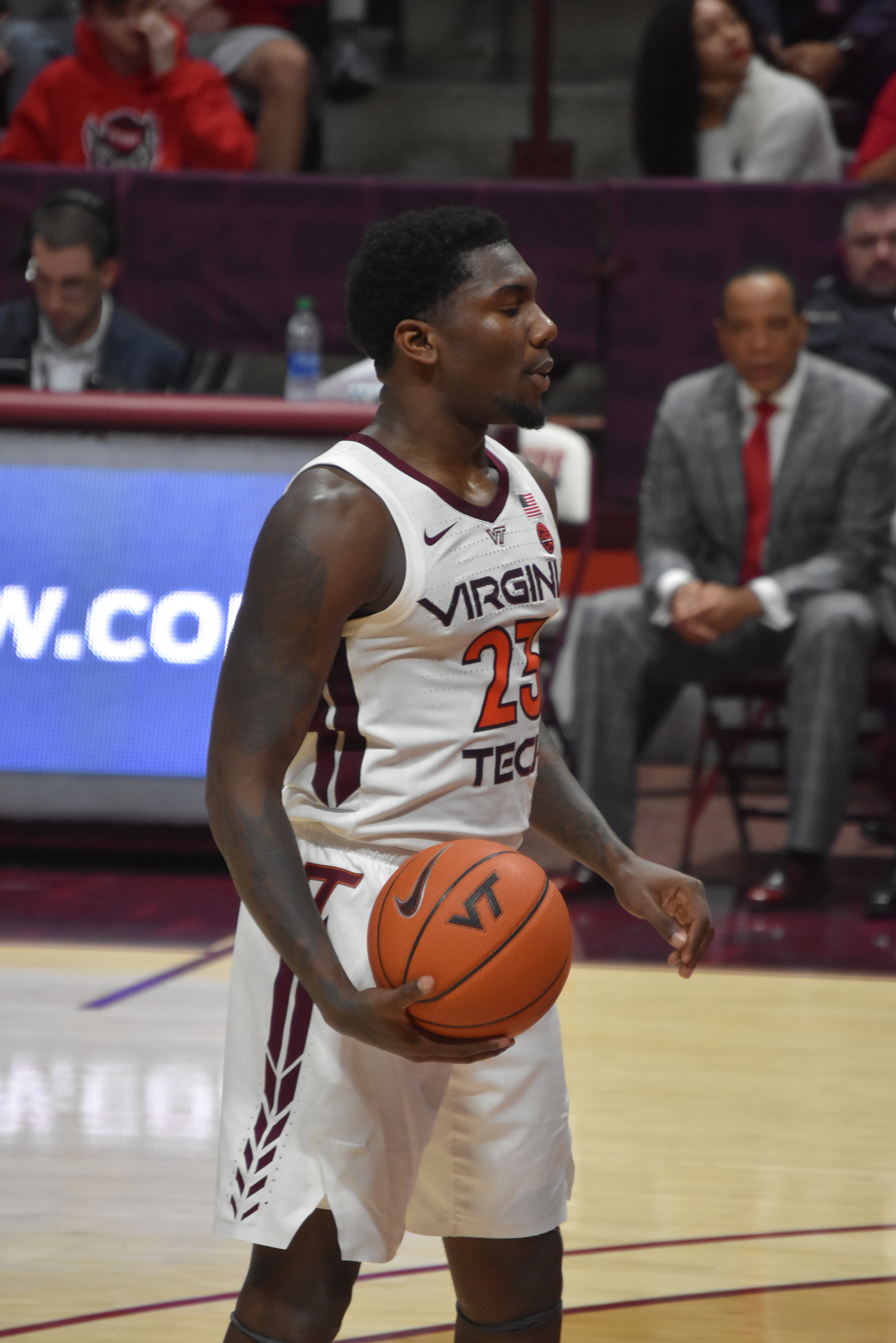
- Radford with Virginia Tech in 2020

No. 19 – Ironi Kiryat Ata
- Position: Point guard / shooting guard
- League: Israeli Basketball Premier League

Personal information
- Born: April 22, 1999 (age 27) Baton Rouge, Louisiana, U.S.
- Listed height: 6 ft 2 in (1.88 m)
- Listed weight: 200 lb (91 kg)

Career information
- High school: McKinley (Baton Rouge, Louisiana)
- College: Virginia Tech (2019–2021); Texas A&M (2021–2024)
- NBA draft: 2024: undrafted

Career history
- 2024–2025: Final Spor
- 2025–2026: Maccabi Ra'anana
- 2026–present: Ironi Kiryat Ata

Career highlights
- Second-team All-SEC (2023)

Tyrece Martel D'Von Radford (born April 22, 1999) is an American professional basketball player for Ironi Kiryat Ata of the Israeli Basketball Premier League.

He previously played college basketball for the Virginia Tech Hokies and the Texas A&M Aggies. With the Hokies, Radford earned All-ACC honorable mention recognition in 2021. He transferred to Texas A&M, where he earned second-team All-SEC honors in 2023.

== High school career ==
Radford played basketball for McKinley High School in Baton Rouge, Louisiana. As a junior, he averaged 17.8 points, 4.5 rebounds and 4.2 assists per game. He was named First team all-district, All-Metro, and second-team Class 5A all-state.

In his senior season, Radford averaged 22 points, six rebounds, and four assists per game. He was named All-Metro and Second team All-State. He was unranked by recruiting services and signed to play college basketball for Virginia Tech, although he was not announced by the program due to questions about his academic eligibility.

== College career ==
=== Virginia Tech ===
Radford redshirted his first season at Virginia Tech for academic reasons. On February 19, 2020, he posted a career-high 26 points and 10 rebounds in a 102–95 triple overtime loss to Miami (Florida). As a freshman in 2019-20, in 32 games he averaged 26.3 minutes, 10.2 points, 6.2 rebounds, 1.7 assists, and 1.0 steals per game, while shooting 60.2% from the field. He was one of two Atlantic Coast Conference players to average more than 10 points and six rebounds while shooting over 60% for the season.

On January 25, 2021, Radford was suspended indefinitely from the team after he was charged with two misdemeanors, driving under the influence (first offense) and carrying a concealed weapon; he received from the court for the DUI a 60-day suspended jail sentence, a 12-month driver license suspension, and a $1,000 fine, while his concealed weapon charge was dismissed provided he maintained good behavior for one year. Virginia Tech lifted the suspension on February 23.

As a sophomore in 2020-21, in 18 games Radford averaged 32.2 minutes, 12.2 points, 5.9 rebounds, and 2.1 assists per game, while shooting 55.0% from the field. He earned All-Atlantic Coast Conference honorable mention.

=== Texas A&M ===
For his junior season, he transferred to Texas A&M, reuniting with former Virginia Tech head coach Buzz Williams. Radford played 40 games (leading the nation), and averaged 10.8 points, 6.2 rebounds, 1.4 assists, and 1.1 steals per game, while shooting 4837% from the floor and 40.2% from three-point range.

As a senior in 2022-23, in 35 games he averaged 31.2 minutes, 13.3 points, 5.3 rebounds, 2.4 assists, and 0.9 steals per game, while shooting 79.6% from the free throw line (7th in the Southeastern Conference). His 1.8 offensive rebounds per game ranked No. 2 in the country, and his total rebounds average ranked No. 10. Radford was named to the Second Team All-SEC. He also earned a bachelor's degree in recreation and youth development.

He opted to return for his fifth season of eligibility, and SEC coaches voted Radford to the Preseason All-SEC Second Team. In 2023-24, in 31 games he averaged 32.8 minutes, 16.5 points (9th in the SEC), 6.5 rebounds (8th), and 2.6 assists per game. He finished his Aggies career as the only guard in Texas A&M history with at least 1,000 points (1,408) and 600 rebounds (636). He earned a master's degree in recreation and youth development. After his 2024 season, Radford declared for the NBA Draft, but went undrafted.

== Professional career ==
=== San Antonio Spurs ===
After going undrafted, Radford was signed as an undrafted free agent by the San Antonio Spurs. He played five games in the NBA Summer League for the Spurs, but did not make the final roster.

=== Final Spor ===
Radford signed with a Türkiye Basketbol Ligi club Final Spor for the 2024-25 season. He played 32 games and averaged 32.9 minutes, 19.4 points, 6.0 rebounds, 4.8 assists, and 1.2 steals per game, while shooting 45.2% from the field.

=== Maccabi Ra'anana ===
For the 2025-26 season, Radford signed with Israeli Basketball Premier League club Maccabi Ra'anana. He played 34 games and averaged 31.4 minutes, 15.1 points, 5.2 rebounds, 3.5 assists, and 1.4 steals per game.

=== Ironi Kiryat Ata ===
In the 2026-27 season, Radford is playing for Ironi Kiryat Ata of the Israeli Basketball Premier League.

== Career statistics ==
Legend
GP	Games played	GS	Games started	MPG	Minutes per game
FG%	Field goal percentage	3P%	3-point field goal percentage	FT%	Free throw percentage
RPG	Rebounds per game	APG	Assists per game	SPG	Steals per game
BPG	Blocks per game	PPG	Points per game	**Bold**	Career high

=== College ===
Year	Team	GP	GS	MPG	FG%	3P%	FT%	RPG	APG	SPG	BPG	PPG
2018–19	Virginia Tech	Redshirt										
2019–20	Virginia Tech	32	29	26.3	**.604**	.083	.691	6.2	1.7	1.0	0.3	10.2
2020–21	Virginia Tech	18	18	32.2	.550	.292	.766	5.9	2.1	0.6	**0.4**	12.2
2021–22	Texas A&M	**40**	**40**	30.1	.487	**.402**	.671	6.2	1.4	**1.2**	0.3	10.9
2022–23	Texas A&M	24	24	30.1	.423	.357	**.789**	5.4	2.3	0.8	0.3	13.6
2023–24	Texas A&M	31	30	**32.8**	.411	.280	.692	**6.5**	**2.6**	0.5	0.1	**16.5**
Career		145	141	29.4	.509	.359	.737	6.0	1.8	0.9	0.3	11.5

=== Professional career ===
Year	Team	GP	GS	MPG	FG%	3P%	FT%	RPG	APG	SPG	BPG	PPG
2024-25	Final Spor	**32**	**31**	**32.9**	**.452**	**.254**	**.791**	**6.0**	**4.8**	**1.2**	**0.4**	**19.4**
Career		32	31	32.9	.452	.254	.791	6.0	4.8	1.2	0.4	19.4

== Personal life ==
Radford is the son of Ben Radford and Tarsar Gilmore. He was named after Tyrese Gibson, a singer who his father liked. In December 2015, Radford's best friend since pre-kindergarten, Kejohn Davis-Carroll, was accidentally shot and killed at age 16 by a 14-year-old friend who was playing with a loaded gun.
