= Taşkıran =

Taşkıran is a Turkish surname. Notable people with the surname include:

- Berkay Taşkıran (born 1997), Turkish basketball player
- Celal Taşkıran (born 1954), Turkish wrestler
- Erkan Taşkıran (born 1985), Turkish footballer
- Ertuğrul Taşkıran (born 1989), Turkish footballer
- Tezer Taşkıran (1907–1979), Turkish–Azerbaijani writer, politician and teacher
