= Yeşilgiresun Belediye =

- Founded: 2006; 20 years ago
- Dissolved: 2018; 8 years ago
- History: Yeşilgiresun Belediyesispor (2006–2018)
- Arena: 19 Eylül Sports Hall
- Capacity: 3,500
- Location: Giresun, Turkey
- Team colors: Green, white
- President: Kerim Aksu
- Head coach: Mihailo Uvalin
- Website: ygbspor.com
Home	Away

Yeşilgiresun Belediyespor, more commonly known as Yeşilgiresun, was a Turkish professional basketball club based in Giresun that played in the Turkish Basketball Super League. The team was founded by Giresun Municipality in 2006. Their home arena was 19 Eylül Sports Hall, with a capacity of 3,500 seats.

== History ==
Yeşilgiresun Belediyespor was founded in 2006 by Giresun Municipality. The team began playing in the EBBL for the 2006–2007 season. From 2006 till 2012, the team played in EBBL/TB3L. In the 2011–12 season of TB3L, the team finished the season in third place and lost the chance to be promoted. But season champion Söğüsten Seramik withdrew from the league and Yeşilgiresun was invited to TB2L by TBF. In the 2012–13 season, the team finished third in the regular season. The team beat Darüşşafaka in quarter-final but lost against Trabzonspor in the semi-final and lost the chance to promoted. In the 2013–14 season, the team finished fifth in the regular season. The team beat Akhisar Belediye in the quarter-final but lost against Darüşşafaka Doğuş in the semi-final and lost the chance to be promoted again. In the 2014–15 season, the team finished sixth in the regular season. The team beat Best Balıkesir B.K. in the quarter-final and then beat Sakarya BB in the semi-final and was promoted to the Turkish Basketball League. The team beat Tüyap Büyükçekmece in the final game and won the title.

In the 2017–18 season, the team was relegated from the BSL back to the second tier TBL. In July 2018, the club announced it was shutting down because of financial problems.

== Season by season ==
Season	Tier	League	Pos.	Turkish Cup
2011–12	3	TB3L	3rd	
2012–13	2	TB2L	3rd	
2013–14	2	TB2L	3rd	
2014–15	2	TB2L	1st	
2015–16	1	BSL	12th	
2016–17	1	BSL	11th	Quarterfinalist
2017–18	1	BSL	15th	

== Players ==
=== Notable players ===
- (Turkey) Barış Güney
- (Turkey) Bora Paçun
- (Turkey) Emircan Koşut
- (Turkey) İnanç Koç
- (Turkey) Okben Ulubay
- (Turkey) Yunus Çankaya
- (United States) Josh Heytvelt
- (United States) Mike Taylor
- (United States) Patrick Miller
- (United States) Ramel Bradley
- (United States) Anthony Gill
- (United States) Ricky Ledo
- (Austria) Rašid Mahalbašić
- (Serbia) Tadija Dragićević
