= İnanç =

İnanç is a Turkish name and may refer to:

- İnanç Koç, Turkish basketball player
- Çetin İnanç, Turkish film director
- Efe İnanç, Turkish footballer
