= Berkay Taşkıran =

Turkish basketball player (born 1997)

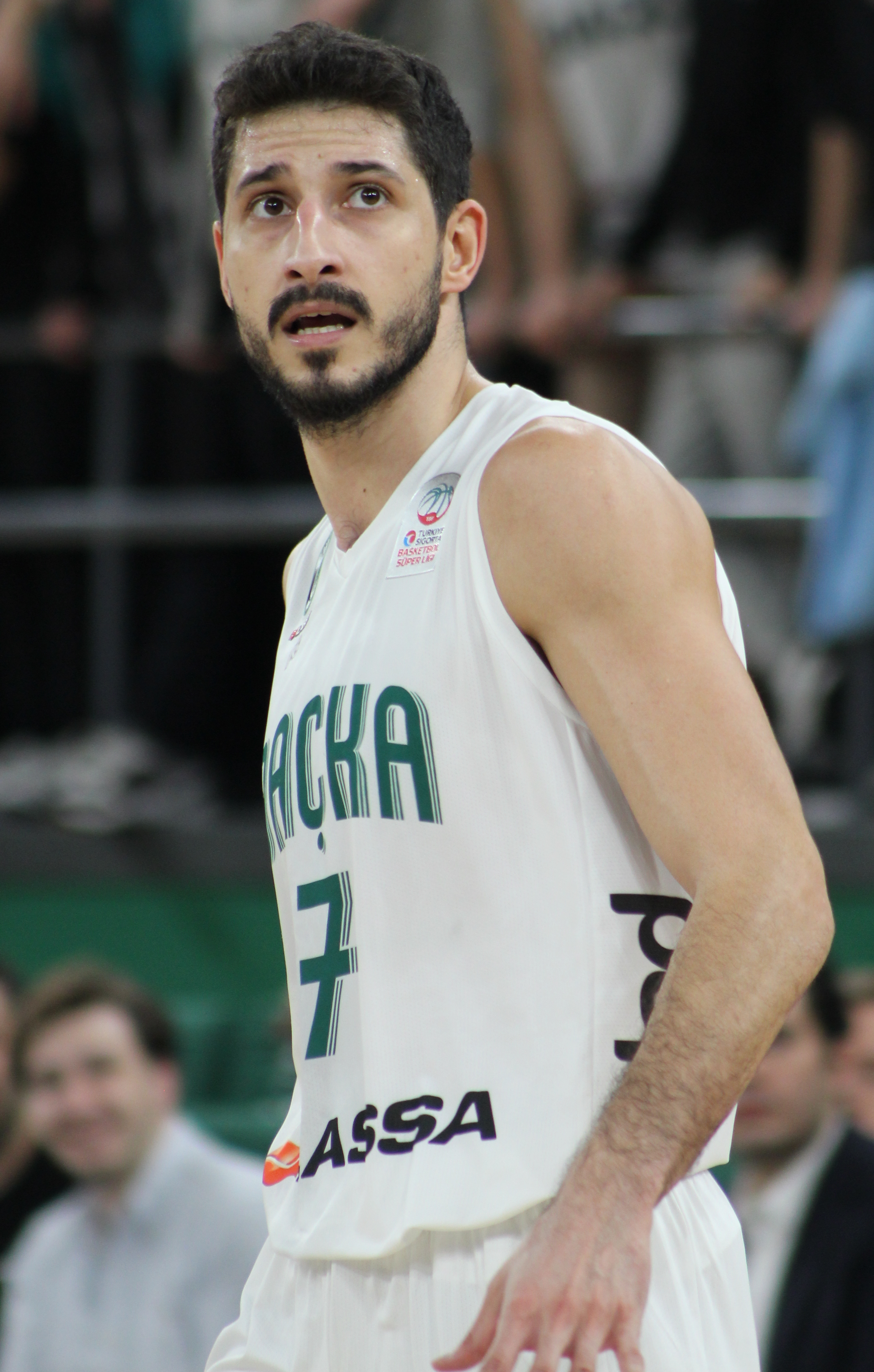

No. 7 – Çayırova Belediyespor
- Position: Shooting guard
- League: Basketbol Süper Ligi

Personal information
- Born: January 17, 1997 (age 29) Istanbul, Turkey
- Listed height: 6 ft 4 in (1.93 m)
- Listed weight: 190 lb (86 kg)

Career information
- Playing career: 2014–present

Career history
- 2014–2019: Beşiktaş Sompo Japan
- 2016–2018: →Yeşilgiresun Belediye (loan)
- 2019–2020: Türk Telekom
- 2020–2022: Büyükçekmece Basketbol
- 2022–2024: Bursaspor
- 2024–2025: Darüşşafaka
- 2025–present: Çayırova Belediyespor

Berkay Enes Taşkıran (born January 17, 1997) is a Turkish professional basketball player for Çayırova Belediyespor of the Basketbol Süper Ligi (BSL). He plays as Shooting guard.
