= Loganville Christian Academy =

Private Christian school in Walton County, Georgia, United States

Location
- Loganville, Georgia; United States; 33°47′50″N 83°51′59″W

Information
- Type: Private
- Established: 1998
- Enrollment: 450+
- Campus: Suburban
- Colors: Navy Blue and gold
- Mascot: Lion
- Website: Loganville Christian Academy

Loganville Christian Academy (LCA) is a private Christian school located in Walton County, Georgia, United States.

== History ==
Loganville Christian Academy is a nondenominational, private school for students in Pre-K through 12th grade. It was founded in 1998 with an enrollment of 68 students and has grown to its current enrollment of 535 students. The academy was first run out of spare rooms at Loganville First Baptist Church and Summit Baptist Churches. In 2004 LCA moved to its current location in Georgia, off Highway 81, between Loganville and Walnut Grove. The school sits on 75 acres (300,000 m^{2}).

A 2009 addition to the campus, the Lodge, houses a two-court gymnasium and nine additional classrooms. Baseball, softball, and football fields were also added in 2009. In 2014, the Barn was built and provides a large meeting space and weight-training facility.

== Athletics ==
Loganville Christian Academy has a 78-acre campus that includes a football stadium, baseball and softball fields, a cross-country course, a gymnasium, and a weight-training facility.

The Athletics Department currently supports approximately forty-five coaches for the middle school and high school teams.

In recent years, LCA has experienced the following: 2013, 2014, and 2015 Rodeo World Champions; 2014 Girls Softball State Champions; 2014 Wrestling State Champion; 2013 Football State Champions; 2012-13 Boys Basketball State Champions; and 2012 Cheerleading State Champions.

LCA is currently in the Georgia Independent School Association (GISA) and is making a move to the Georgia High School Association (GHSA) in 2020.

Additionally, Play LCA trains elementary students in 1st-5th grades.

== Sports ==
- Baseball
- Basketball
- Spirit Cheerleading
- Clay Targets
- Cross country
- Football
- Golf
- Rodeo
- Soccer
- Softball
- Swimming
- Tennis
- Track
- Volleyball
- Wrestling (formerly)

== Notable alumni ==
- Tyler Hubbard - Country Singer
- Daniel Miller - professional basketball player
