= Mersin MSK =

Mersin
- Nickname: Carettalar (Caretta's)
- Leagues: Türkiye Basketbol Ligi
- Founded: 2019; 7 years ago
- Arena: Servet Tazegül Arena
- Capacity: 7,500
- Location: Mersin, Turkey
- Team colors: Yellow, black
- President: Vahap Seçer
- Head coach: Burak Gören
- 2024–25 position: BSL; 6th of 16
Home	Away

Mersin MSK is a Turkish professional basketball club based in Mersin. Founded in 2019, the club currently competes in the Türkiye Basketbol Ligi, the second-tier basketball league in Turkey.

== History ==
After the dissolution of Mersin BB in 2018, Mersin MSK was founded in 2019 as a successor to this club. They spent two successful seasons in Turkish Men's Regional Basketball League (EBBL) and Turkish Basketball Second League (TB2L) and they managed to be promoted to Türkiye Basketbol Ligi (TBL) before 2021–22 season. For the first season in second tier, they finished the league at 14th place, just above the relegation line.

In 2022–23 season they finished the league in 3rd place but eliminated in the playoff semifinals against Semt77 Yalovaspor.

They started the 2023–24 season with important signings and finished the season again in 3rd place after the normal season. After a competitive playoff period, they won the championship and earned promoted to Basketbol Süper Ligi.

== Players ==
=== Current roster ===
Note: Flags indicate national team eligibility at FIBA-sanctioned events. Players may hold other non-FIBA nationalities not displayed.

Mersin MSK roster
Players
Coaches

Pos.	No.	Nat.	Name	Ht.	Age
C	0	(United Kingdom)	Olaseni, Gabriel	2.10 m (6 ft 11 in)	34 – 29 December 1991
PG	3	(Turkey)	Özmızrak, Kartal	1.88 m (6 ft 2 in)	31 – 29 August 1995
G	4	(United States)	March, Ronald	1.96 m (6 ft 5 in)	33 – 24 July 1993
F	6	(Turkey)	Çekici, Koray	1.98 m (6 ft 6 in)	24 – 15 July 2002
PG	7	(United States)	Cowan Jr., Anthony	1.83 m (6 ft 0 in)	28 – 7 October 1997
SG	9	(Mexico)	Cruz, Francisco (C)	1.91 m (6 ft 3 in)	36 – 3 October 1989
PF	11	(Turkey)	Alyanak, Anıl	2.03 m (6 ft 8 in)	18 – 7 January 2008
PF	22	(France)	Chassang, Alexandre	2.03 m (6 ft 8 in)	31 – 22 November 1994
SG	7	(Turkey)	Kurtuldum, Mustafa	1.91 m (6 ft 3 in)	25 – 10 May 2001
PF	14	(Turkey)	Onar, Yesukan	2.03 m (6 ft 8 in)	27 – 14 September 1998
PG	20	(Turkey)	Tülüoğlu, Arca	1.80 m (5 ft 11 in)	29 – 13 June 1997

Head coach

- Vacant

Assistant coach(es)

- (Spain) Alejandro Formento Sanchez
- (Turkey) Ali Ruhi Balkanlı
- (Turkey) Oğuzhan Bakır
- (Turkey) Gökmen Doğan Şahin

Legend

- (C) Team captain
- Injured

- Roster
Updated: June 22, 2026

=== Depth chart ===
Pos.	Starting 5	Bench 1	Bench 2
C	Gabriel Olaseni
PF	Jack White	Alexandre Chassang	Koray Çekici
SF	Ronald March	Ergi Tırpancı
SG	Anthony Cowan Jr.
PG	Francisco Cruz	Kartal Özmızrak

== Honours ==
Türkiye Basketbol Ligi

- Runners-up (1): 2023–24

== Season by season ==
Season	Tier	Division	Pos.	Pos.	W–L	Cup Competitions	European Competitions	
2020–21	3	TB2L	1st	–	8–4	–		
2021–22	2	TBL	14th	–	11–19	–		
2022–23	2	TBL	3rd	Quarterfinals	25–11	–		
2023–24	2	TBL	3rd	Champion	34–10	–		
2024–25	1	BSL	6th	Quarterfinals	16–16	Semifinalist		
2025–26	1	BSL	15th	–	9–21	–	Champions League	PI
