= Gabriel Olaseni =

British basketball player (born 1991)

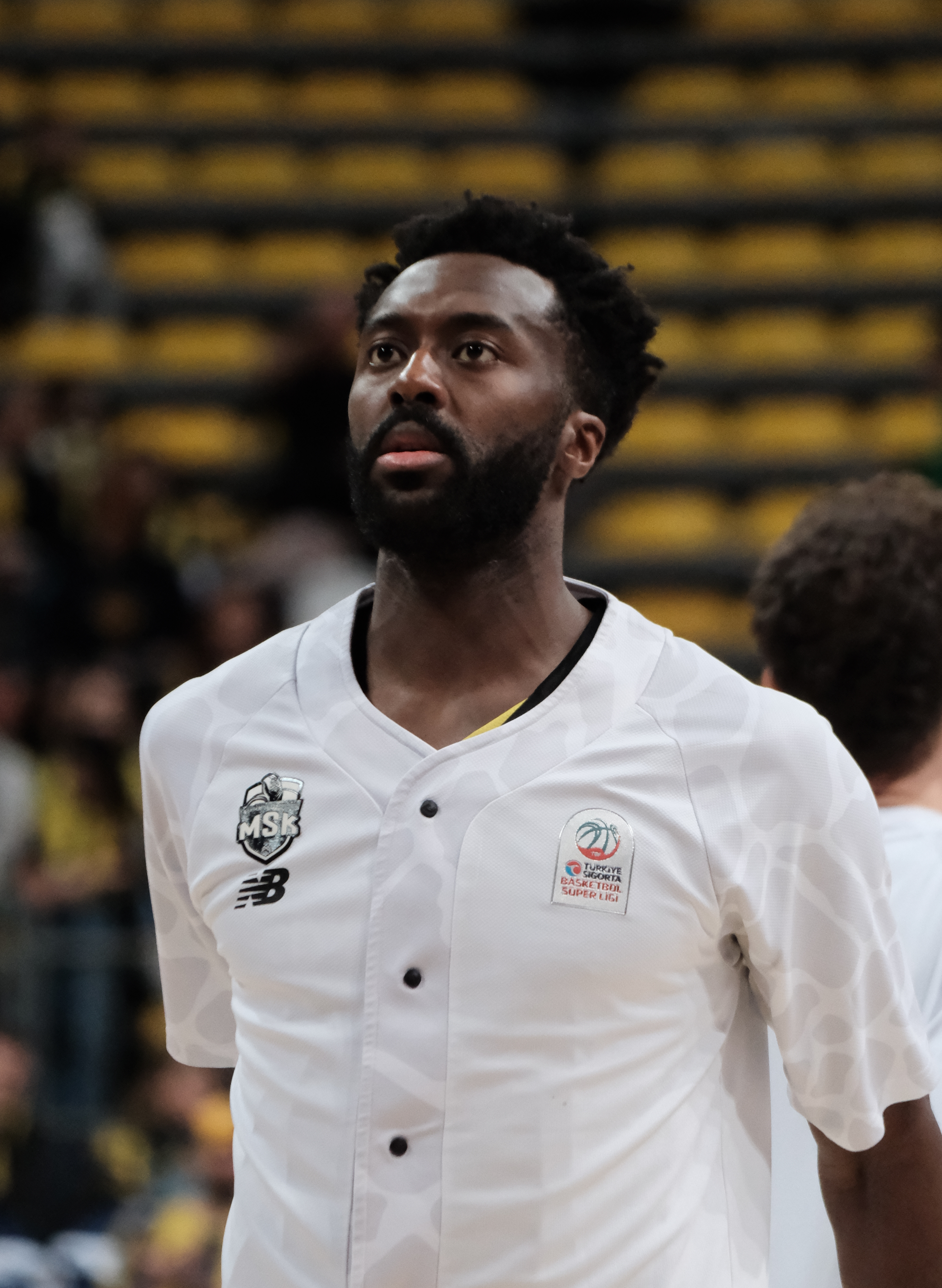
- Olaseni with Mersin in 2026

No. 0 – Casademont Zaragoza
- Position: Center
- League: Liga ACB

Personal information
- Born: 29 December 1991 (age 34) Walthamstow, Essex, England
- Listed height: 210 cm (6 ft 11 in)
- Listed weight: 104 kg (229 lb)

Career information
- High school: Sunrise Christian Academy (Bel Aire, Kansas)
- College: Iowa (2011–2015)
- NBA draft: 2015: undrafted
- Playing career: 2015–present

Career history
- 2015: Brose Bamberg
- 2015–2016: Gießen 46ers
- 2016–2017: Dinamo Sassari
- 2017: Orléans Loiret
- 2017–2018: Fuenlabrada
- 2018–2019: s.Oliver Würzburg
- 2019–2020: Bursaspor
- 2020–2021: Büyükçekmece
- 2021–2023: Darüşşafaka
- 2023–2024: London Lions
- 2024–2026: Mersin
- 2026–present: Zaragoza

Career highlights
- All-EuroCup First Team (2024); Turkish League rebounding leader (2025); British League champion (2024); British League Team of the Year (2024); British League All-British Team of the Year (2024); German Supecup winner (2015); Big Ten Sixth Man of the Year (2015)

Abodunrin Gabriel Olaseni (born 29 December 1991) is a British professional basketball player for Casademont Zaragoza of the Spanish Liga ACB. He also plays for the Great Britain men's national basketball team.

== Professional career ==
Olaseni went undrafted in the 2015 NBA draft. In July 2015, he joined the Miami Heat for the 2015 NBA Summer League. On 23 July 2015 he signed with German club Brose Baskets. On 22 November 2015 he was loaned to Gießen 46ers for the rest of the 2015–16 season.

On 13 July 2016 Olaseni signed with Italian club Dinamo Sassari. On 3 March 2017 he parted ways with Sassari. The next day he signed with French club Orléans Loiret Basket for the rest of the 2017–18 Pro A season.

On 23 August 2017 Olaseni signed with Fuenlabrada for the 2017–18 season.

For the 2018–19 season, he signed with s.Oliver Würzburg of the German Bundesliga. He played in the 2019 FIBA Europe Cup Finals with s.Oliver, where he lost to his former team Dinamo Sassari.

On 13 August 2019 he signed with Bursaspor of the Turkish Basketball Super League.

On 10 August 2020 he signed with Büyükçekmece Basketbol of the Turkish Basketbol Süper Ligi (BSL). Olaseni averaged 15.6 points and 9.1 rebounds per game.

On 3 July 2021 he signed with Darüşşafaka.

On 28 June 2023 he signed with London Lions of the British Basketball League (BBL).

On 6 July 2024 he signed with Mersin MSK of the Basketbol Süper Ligi (BSL).

On 13 May 2026 he signed with Casademont Zaragoza of the Spanish Liga ACB, signing until the end of the season. After helping Zaragoza avoid relegation in the last round of the 2025–26 ACB season, Olaseni signed a contract extension for two more seasons on 22 June 2026.

== National team career ==
Olaseni has established himself as a key member of the Great Britain men's national team. He is the most efficient scorer in GB national team history with a career field goal percentage of .647 (165/255) as of 25 February 2020.

Olaseni had a breakout performance at FIBA EuroBasket 2017 with averages of 16.8 points (11th) and 11.2 rebounds (2nd). He led all players in defensive rebounding per game (8.8) and earned the highest efficiency rating per game (26.8). Matched up against NBA star Kristaps Porziņģis, Olaseni scored a career high 23 points on 10 for 11 shooting in their game against Latvia.

== Personal life ==
Born in England, Olaseni is of Nigerian descent.

== Career statistics ==
Legend
GP	Games played	GS	Games started	MPG	Minutes per game
FG%	Field-goal percentage	3P%	3-point field-goal percentage	FT%	Free-throw percentage
RPG	Rebounds per game	APG	Assists per game	SPG	Steals per game
BPG	Blocks per game	PPG	Points per game	PIR	Performance index rating
**Bold**	Career high

=== EuroLeague ===
Year	Team	GP	GS	MPG	FG%	3P%	FT%	RPG	APG	SPG	BPG	PPG	PIR
2015–16	Brose Bamberg	5	2	13.2	.417	–	1.000	2.8	.6	.2	.4	2.4	1.2
Career		5	2	13.2	.417	–	1.000	2.8	.6	.2	.4	2.4	1.2
