= Samsunspor (basketball) =

Reeder Samsunspor
- Nickname: Kırmızı Şimşekler (The Red Lightning)
- Leagues: Türkiye Basketbol Ligi
- Founded: 30 June 1965; 61 years ago as 19 Mayıs
- Arena: Mustafa Dağıstanlı Sports Hall
- Capacity: 2,000
- Location: Samsun, Turkey
- Team colors: Red, white, black
- President: Yüksel Yıldırım
- Team manager: Emre Ekim
- Head coach: Cihan Özolcay
- Team captain: Göktuğ Baş
- 2022–23 position: TBL, 2nd of 16
- Championships: 1 Turkish Basketball First League; 1 Anatolian Cup
- Website: Link

Samsunspor, also known as Reeder Samsunspor for sponsorship reasons, is a Turkish professional basketball club based in Samsun. Founded in 1965, the club is the basketball section of the multi-sport club Samsunspor and currently competes in the Basketbol Süper Ligi, the top-tier basketball league in Turkey.

== History ==
Samsunspor, which was established in 1927 and became a professional club in 1965, had a basketball branch according to the information provided in its registration document. The professional basketball team was established on December 3, 1966, following the start of the professional league.

In 1967, the basketball team, composed almost entirely of the squad from 19 Mayıs High School, started playing their home matches at Yaşar Doğu Sports Hall, which was opened the same year. They played their first match against the soldiers of the American radar base in Samsun. Within three years, the basketball team showed significant progress and became one of the strong teams in Anatolia.

After winning the local league in 1967 and participating in the 1967 Anatolian Cup, the team became champions in the 1970 Anatolian Cup. They also successfully completed the promotion matches in Bolu, earning a place in the Turkish Basketball First League for the first time. The championship squad of Samsunspor included Osman Şenher, Cudi İmamoğulları, Ferit Bestami, Uğur Pehlivan, Kaya Akal, Ertuğrul Bayraktar, Samet İmamoğulları, Yalçın Gürpınar, and two American players.

Samsunspor finished the 1971–72 season, their first season in the Turkish Basketball First League, as champions by losing only one match in the final week against Yenişehir. This achievement granted them the right to compete in the Turkish National Basketball League, alongside teams from Ankara, İzmir, and Istanbul, making them the first team outside of these cities to earn that opportunity. The starting lineup consisting of Tansev Mıhçıoğlu, İsmet Badem, Cudi İmamoğulları, İren İmre, and Yalçın Gürpınar played a key role in winning this championship. However, the club began to face financial difficulties following this success and couldn't pay the players' salaries. As a result, Samsunspor had to withdraw from the league during the ongoing 1972–73 season and didn't participate in the leagues the following year. During this period, the team disbanded, and the basketball branch was closed.

After the closure of the branch, Samsun DSİ, one of the teams representing Samsun in basketball leagues, achieved promotion to the Turkish Second Division Basketball League in the 1989–90 season. They competed in this league for three seasons. Samsunspor reopened its basketball branch at the beginning of the 1992–93 season under the presidency of İsmail Uyanık, a former basketball player. They acquired the competitive rights of Samsun DSİ and incorporated players from Samsun Yolspor. Due to insufficient infrastructure, the team had to relinquish its right to promotion to the Turkish Basketball First League in the 2001–02 season. However, in the 2004–05 season, thanks to İsmail Uyanık's personal efforts, they managed to regain promotion to the Turkish Basketball First League. Unfortunately, despite participating in the fixture draw and having Panasonic as their name sponsor, the team decided to withdraw from the league due to insufficient support from the new management after İsmail Uyanık stepped down as president.

The revival of the branch occurred once again during İsmail Uyanık's presidency, prior to the 2019–20 season, by taking over the basketball team competing in the Turkish Basketball Second League from Samsun Büyükşehir Belediyesi Anakent. After acquiring the team, an application was made to participate in the Turkish Basketball First League due to the withdrawal of some teams, which resulted in available slots. Samsunspor's application was accepted, and they started the new season competing in this league. The Mustafa Dağıstanlı Sports Hall was designated as the venue for training sessions and home matches.

After the end of the season, a restructuring took place in basketball, where the branch, formerly a part of Samsunspor, was transformed into an independent entity under the name of Samsunspor Basketbol club. In the 2019–20 season, the team, which was in the relegation zone, managed to stay in the league as the leagues were canceled due to the COVID-19 pandemic in Turkey. Subsequently, the club underwent administrative restructuring and was once again made a branch under Samsunspor. Emre Ekim was appointed as the general manager, and the squad was revamped.

In the 2020–21 season, Samsunspor finished in second place in the regular season but was eliminated in the finals of the playoff series, failing to promote to the higher league. In the 2021–22 season, Samsunspor finished the season in second place again, and were eliminated in the playoff finals. In the 2022–23 season, the team competed under the name "Yılyak Samsunspor" due to a sponsorship agreement. They completed the season as the playoff champions and earned promotion to the Basketbol Süper Ligi.

== Sponsorship names ==
- Yılyak Samsunspor: 2022–2023
- Reeder Samsunspor: 2023–present

== Players ==
=== Current roster ===
Note: Flags indicate national team eligibility at FIBA-sanctioned events. Players may hold other non-FIBA nationalities not displayed.

Reeder Samsunspor roster
Players
Coaches

Pos.	No.	Nat.	Name	Ht.	Age
PG	9	(Turkey)	Aydoğan, Eray	1.85 m (6 ft 1 in)	26 – 25 February 2000
PG	13	(United States)	Crawford, Bryant	1.91 m (6 ft 3 in)	29 – 21 March 1997
C	65	(Turkey)	Şenli, Doğan	2.05 m (6 ft 9 in)	34 – 16 July 1992

Head coach

- (Turkey) Cihan Özolcay

Team manager

- (Turkey) Emre Ekim

Legend

- (C) Team captain
- Injured

- Roster
Updated: March 8, 2024

=== Notable players ===
Note: Flags indicate national team eligibility at FIBA-sanctioned events. Players may hold other non-FIBA nationalities not displayed.

Criteria

To appear in this section a player must have either:

- Set a club record or won an individual award while at the club
- Played at least one official international match for their national team at any time
- Played at least one official NBA match at any time.

- (Turkey) İzzet Türkyılmaz
- (Brazil) Tim Soares
- (Bulgaria) Dejan Ivanov
- (Croatia) Ante Delaš
- (Hungary) Mikael Hopkins
- (Israel) Nimrod Levi
- (Kosovo) Yll Kaçaniku
- (North Macedonia) Predrag Samardžiski
- (United States) Jerry Smith
- (United States) Matt Mooney
- (United States) Tyshawn Taylor

== Honours ==
Turkish Basketball First League

- Winners (1): 1971–72
- Runners-up (1): 2022–23

Anatolian Cup

- Winners (1): 1970
