= Francisco Cruz =

Mexican basketball player (born 1989)

Pako Cruz
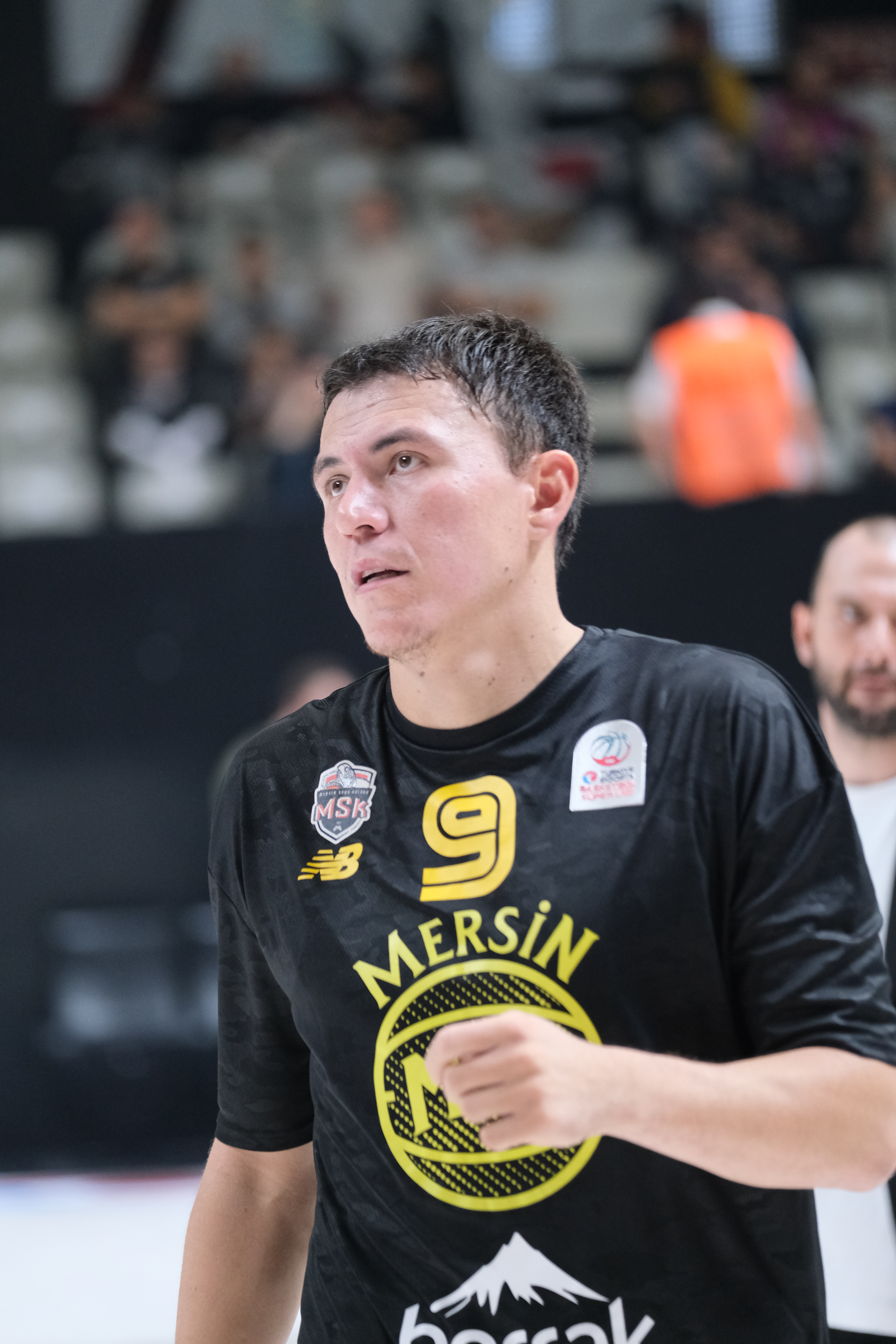
- Cruz with Mersin MSK in 2024

No. 9 – Astros de Jalisco
- Position: Shooting guard
- League: LNBP

Personal information
- Born: October 3, 1989 (age 37) Nogales, Mexico
- Listed height: 6 ft 3 in (1.91 m)
- Listed weight: 217 lb (98 kg)

Career information
- High school: Abraham Lincoln (Denver, Colorado)
- College: Western Nebraska CC (2008–2010); Wyoming (2010–2012)
- NBA draft: 2012: undrafted
- Playing career: 2012–present

Career history
- 2012–2015: Halcones Rojos
- 2013: Pioneros de Quintana Roo
- 2014: Fuerza Guinda de Nogales
- 2015: Ciclista Olímpico
- 2015–2016: VEF Rīga
- 2016–2019: Fuenlabrada
- 2019–2020: Rytas Vilnius
- 2020–2021: Afyon Belediye
- 2021–2022: Tofaş
- 2022–2024: Manisa Büyükşehir Belediyespor
- 2024–2026: Mersin MSK
- 2026–present: Astros de Jalisco

Career highlights
- Turkish Basketball League Scoring Leader (2021)
Medals
Men's basketball
Representing Mexico
FIBA AmeriCup
Bronze medal – third place	2017 Argentina
Centrobasket
Gold medal – first place	2014 Mexico
Silver medal – second place	2016 Panama
FIBA COCABA Championship
Gold medal – first place	2013 El Salvador

Francisco "Pako" Javier Cruz Saldívar (born October 3, 1989) is a Mexican professional basketball player for Mersin MSK of the Basketbol Süper Ligi (BSL). He also represents the senior Mexico national basketball team. He played NCAA Division I college basketball at Wyoming. He is a 1.91 m (6 ft 3 in) tall shooting guard, that can also play as a small forward.

== High school ==
Cruz attended and played basketball at Abraham Lincoln High School, in Denver, Colorado.

== College career ==
After high school, Cruz played college basketball. He first played at Western Nebraska Community College (JUCO), from 2008 to 2010. He then transferred to Wyoming (NCAA Division I), where he played with the Wyoming Cowboys, from 2010 to 2012.

== Professional career ==
Cruz began his pro career with the Mexican League club Halcones Rojos, in 2012. In 2015, he moved the Argentine League club Ciclista Olímpico. He then joined the Latvian club VEF Rīga, with which he played in the VTB United League.

In 2016, he joined the Spanish club Fuenlabrada, of the Liga ACB and European-wide 2nd-tier level EuroCup.

On 3 August 2019, he signed with Rytas Vilnius of the Lithuanian Basketball League.

On August 15, 2020, he has signed with Afyon Belediye of the Turkish Basketbol Süper Ligi.

On June 25, 2021, he has signed with Tofaş of the Basketbol Süper Ligi.

On January 27, 2024, he signed with Mersin MSK of the Türkiye Basketbol Ligi (BSL).

== National team career ==
Cruz is a member of the senior Mexico national basketball team. With Mexico, he played at the 2014 FIBA World Cup, and at the 2015 FIBA Americas Championship. He also played at the 2016 Turin FIBA World Olympic Qualifying Tournament, and at the 2017 FIBA AmeriCup, where he won a bronze medal, and was named to the All-Tournament Team.
