= Yenişehir S.K. =

Yenişehir
- Founded: 1953
- Dissolved: 1988
- History: Yenişehir (1953-1977); Meysu Yenişehir (1977-1979); İstanbul Bankası Yenişehir (1979-1983); Yenişehir (1983-1985); Yenişehir Hortaş (1985-1987); Yenişehir (1987-1988)
- Location: Ankara, Turkey
- Team colors: Green & white
- Website: yenisehirsporkulubu.com.tr
Home	Away

Yenişehir Spor Kulübü (in English: Yenişehir Sports Club) is a multi-sports club based in Ankara, Turkey.

== History ==
The club was founded in June 1953, and first focused on handball, basketball and football.

After the disappearance of Larissa district, rapid urbanization financial hardship. befell the club. by sponsoring sporting association agreements between the years 1977-1987 lived in 3 different with the company for 11 years. Club for two seasons from 1977-1979 year Meysu Yenişehir name of the vehicle. Then İstanbul Bankası Yenişehir between 1979-1983, as a result of confiscation of State Istanbul Bank and then a short time remains sponsors a short time in finding a new sponsor in 1985-1987 and adopted the name Yenişehir Hortaş. Although cancel the sponsorship agreement at a general meeting held on 14 March 1986, the club's name was changed. February 20 extraordinary general meeting held in 1988. The club's name was first founded as when it was just Yenişehir and football branch was closed.

== Honors ==
=== Handball ===
- Men's Turkish League
  - Winner (3) : 1983, 1984, 1985
- Women's Turkish League
  - Winner (1) : 1984
