= OGM Ormanspor =

- Leagues: TBL
- Founded: 1971; 54 years ago
- Arena: M. Sait Zarifoğlu Spor Salonu
- Capacity: 2,000
- Location: Ankara, Turkey
- Team colors: Dark Green, Light Green, White
- Head coach: Volkan Başaran
- Team captain: Cevher Özer
- 2018–19 position: TBL, 3rd of 16 (promoted via play-offs)
- Championships: 1 Turkish Second League
- Website: Link
Home	Away

OGM Ormanspor is a Turkish professional basketball club based in Ankara. Currently, the team plays in the Turkish Basketball First League. Established in 1971, the team played in the lower divisions of Turkish basketball for decades. In 2019, Ormanspor was promoted to the BSL for the first time in club history.

The basketball team is part of the multi-sports club OGM Ormanspor.

== History ==
The club was established in 1971. In the 2016–17 season, Ormanspor won the third tier TB2L and was promoted to the second tier TBL. The following season, Ormanspor finished eleventh in the standings. On 14 June 2019, Ormanspor was promoted to the first tier Basketbol Süper Ligi as winners of the TBL play-offs. It was the first time the team would play in the highest tier of Turkish basketball. The team beat İTÜ in the play-off finals, 3–2.

== Honours ==
Turkish Basketball Second League

- Champions (1): 2016–17

== Players ==
=== Notable players ===
- (Turkey) Kaan İşbilen
- (United States) Tu Holloway
