= İnanç Koç =

Turkish basketball player and coach

Personal information
- Born: February 9, 1979 (age 47) Diyarbakır, Turkey
- Listed height: 6 ft 7 in (2.01 m)
- Listed weight: 220 lb (100 kg)

Career information
- Playing career: 1997–2017
- Position: Assistant coach

Career history

Playing
- 1997–2001: Tuborg Pilsener
- 2001–2003: Beşiktaş
- 2003: Türk Telekom
- 2003–2007: Pınar Karşıyaka
- 2007–2008: Banvit
- 2008–2010: Mersin BB
- 2010–2013: Tofaş
- 2013–2016: Pınar Karşıyaka
- 2016–2017: Yeşilgiresun Belediye

Coaching
- 2017–2019: Pınar Karşıyaka (assistant)
- 2020–2022: Yukatel Merkezefendi (assistant)

İnanç Koç (born February 9, 1979) is a Turkish professional basketball coach and former player. He played the small forward position. He was most recently the assistant coach for the Yukatel Merkezefendi of the Turkish Basketball Super League.
