= Yalovaspor BK =

Turkish basketball team

Yalovaspor Basketbol
- Leagues: TB2L
- Founded: 1998; 28 years ago
- Arena: Yalova 90. Yıl Spor Salonu
- Capacity: 2,000
- Location: Yalova, Turkey
- Team colors: Green, Red and White
- President: Orbay Tuna
- Head coach: Candost Volkan
- Team captain: Melih Kapucu
- Championships: 1 Türkiye Basketbol Ligi
Home	Away

Yalovaspor BK, is a Turkish professional basketball club based in Yalova, which currently competes in the Turkish Basketball Second League (TB2L). The team was founded in 1998 and got promoted to the top division in 2021. Their home arena is 90. Yıl Spor Salonu with a capacity of 2,000 seats. The team was sponsored by Semt77 until 2024.

== History ==
Yalovaspor BK was founded in 1998. In 2016 they have been promoted to Turkish Basketball First League (TBL). On 15 June 2021, Semt77 Yalovaspor promoted to the BSL for the first time in club history as winners of the TBL play-offs.

== Sponsorship names ==
- Yalova Group Belediyespor: 2015–2019
- Semt77 Yalovaspor: 2019–2024
- Yalovaspor Basketbol: 2024–present

== Players ==
=== Current roster ===
Note: Flags indicate national team eligibility at FIBA-sanctioned events. Players may hold other non-FIBA nationalities not displayed.

Semt77 Yalovaspor roster
Players
Coaches

Pos.	No.	Nat.	Name	Ht.	Wt.	Age
PG	8	(Turkey)	Bayram, Kadir	1.93 m (6 ft 4 in)		29 – 9 July 1997
F/C	77	(Turkey)	Kapucu, Melih (C)	2.06 m (6 ft 9 in)		36 – 29 January 1990
SG		(Turkey)	Erülkü, Tayfun	1.91 m (6 ft 3 in)		32 – 22 February 1994
G		(Turkey)	Aygündüz, Berke	1.96 m (6 ft 5 in)		27 – 26 August 1998
C		(United States)	McNair Jr., Will	2.11 m (6 ft 11 in)		26 – 25 May 2000
F		(Turkey)	Çekici, Koray	1.98 m (6 ft 6 in)		24 – 15 July 2002
PG		(Turkey)	Barış, Ali Efe	1.93 m (6 ft 4 in)		25 – 13 April 2001
C		(Turkey)	Şenkahya, Kılıçarslan	2.10 m (6 ft 11 in)		25 – 21 August 2000

Head coach

- (Turkey) Candost Volkan

Assistant coach(es)

- (Turkey) Mehmet Kabaran

Team manager

Legend

- (C) Team captain
- Injured

- Roster
Updated: August 27, 2025

=== Notable players ===
Note: Flags indicate national team eligibility at FIBA-sanctioned events. Players may hold other non-FIBA nationalities not displayed.

Criteria

To appear in this section a player must have either:

- Set a club record or won an individual award while at the club
- Played at least one official international match for their national team at any time
- Played at least one official NBA match at any time.

- (Turkey) İlkan Karaman
- (Turkey) İzzet Türkyılmaz
- (Azerbaijan) Orhan Aydın
- (France) Alexandre Chassang
- (Nigeria) Deji Akindele
- (Slovenia) Luka Rupnik
- (United States) Ricky Ledo
- (United States) C. J. Williams

== Honours ==
Türkiye Basketbol Ligi

- Winners (1): 2023–24
- Runners-up (1): 2020–21
