= Best Balıkesir B.K. =

Turkish basketball club

Balıkesir BSB
- Leagues: TBL
- Founded: 2004; 22 years ago
- History: Potanın Yıldızları (2004–2009); Best Balıkesir (2009–2024); Balıkesir Büyükşehir Belediyespor Basketbol (2024–pressnt)
- Arena: Kurtdereli Sports Hall
- Capacity: 2,000
- Location: Balıkesir, Turkey
- Team colors: Blue, White, Green
- President: Yusuf Gafur Çoymak
- Head coach: Hakan Ataş
- Website: bestbasketbol.com
Home	Away

Best Balıkesir Basketbol Kulübü, more commonly known as Best Balıkesir is a Turkish professional basketball club based in Balıkesir. The team plays in the Türkiye Basketbol Ligi (TBL), the second division of Turkey. The team was founded as Potanın Yıldızları Basketbol Kulübü in 2004. Their home arena is Kurtdereli Sports Hall with a capacity of 2,000 seats. The team was sponsored by Best A.Ş. of Yırcalı Group, an energy company in Turkey, for over a decade.

== Logos ==
Best Balıkesir logo used until the 2015–16 season

== Season by season ==
Season	Tier	League	Pos.	W–L
2010–11	3	TB3L		
2011–12	2	TB2L	10th	
2012–13	2	TB2L	8th	
2013–14	2	TB2L	10th	
2014–15	2	TB2L	3rd	
2015–16	2	TBL	2nd	25–18
2016–17	1	BSL	15th	7–23

== Players ==
=== Current roster ===
Best Balıkesir Basketbol roster
Players
Coaches

Pos.	No.	Nat.	Name	Ht.	Wt.	Age
PG	1	(United States)	Kelley, Tre	1.88 m (6 ft 2 in)	85 kg (187 lb)	41 – 23 January 1985
PG	4	(Turkey)	Pomakoğlu, Hakan			30 – 4 January 1996
G/F	7	(United States)	Nichols, Austin	1.98 m (6 ft 6 in)	100 kg (220 lb)	44 – 8 April 1982
SG	10	(Turkey)	Akçay, Yunus	1.91 m (6 ft 3 in)		37 – 21 January 1989
PF	11	(Turkey)	Sonkol, Ümit	2.06 m (6 ft 9 in)	102 kg (225 lb)	43 – 23 June 1983
PG	12	(United States)	Andrews, Andrew	1.88 m (6 ft 2 in)	88 kg (194 lb)	33 – 25 May 1993
C	13	(Turkey)	Hortum, Uğur	2.11 m (6 ft 11 in)		33 – 28 August 1993
SG	15	(Turkey)	Solkol, Mertcan	1.95 m (6 ft 5 in)	90 kg (198 lb)	30 – 5 February 1996
SF	17	(Turkey)	Pastal, Valentin	2.04 m (6 ft 8 in)	95 kg (209 lb)	42 – 9 June 1984
PF	18	(Turkey)	Yurteri, Ahmet Barış	1.96 m (6 ft 5 in)		30 – 27 May 1996
PF	20	(Nigeria)	Ofoegbu, Ike	2.03 m (6 ft 8 in)	102 kg (225 lb)	42 – 30 October 1984

Head coach

- (Turkey) Hakan Ataş

Assistant coach(es)

- (Turkey) Sinan Çambel
- (Turkey) Haşim Yılmaz

Legend

- (C) Team captain
- Injured

=== Notable players ===
- Deishuan Booker
