= Adanaspor Basketbol =

Turkish basketball club

- Leagues: TBL
- Founded: 2006; 20 years ago
- History: Adanaspor Basketbol (2006–present)
- Arena: Menderes Sports Hall
- Location: Adana, Turkey
- Team colors: Orange, White
- President: Tevriz Dura
- Website: www.adanasporkulubu.com
| Home | Away |

Adanaspor Basketbol is a Turkish basketball club based in Adana, Turkey that plays in Turkish Basketball League (TBL). They were founded in 2006 and the municipality of Adana started to support the team in 2010. They played in the Regional League for 3 years and they promoted to the Turkish Basketball League (TBL) in 2010–2011 season. Their colors are orange and white. They also have a football team.

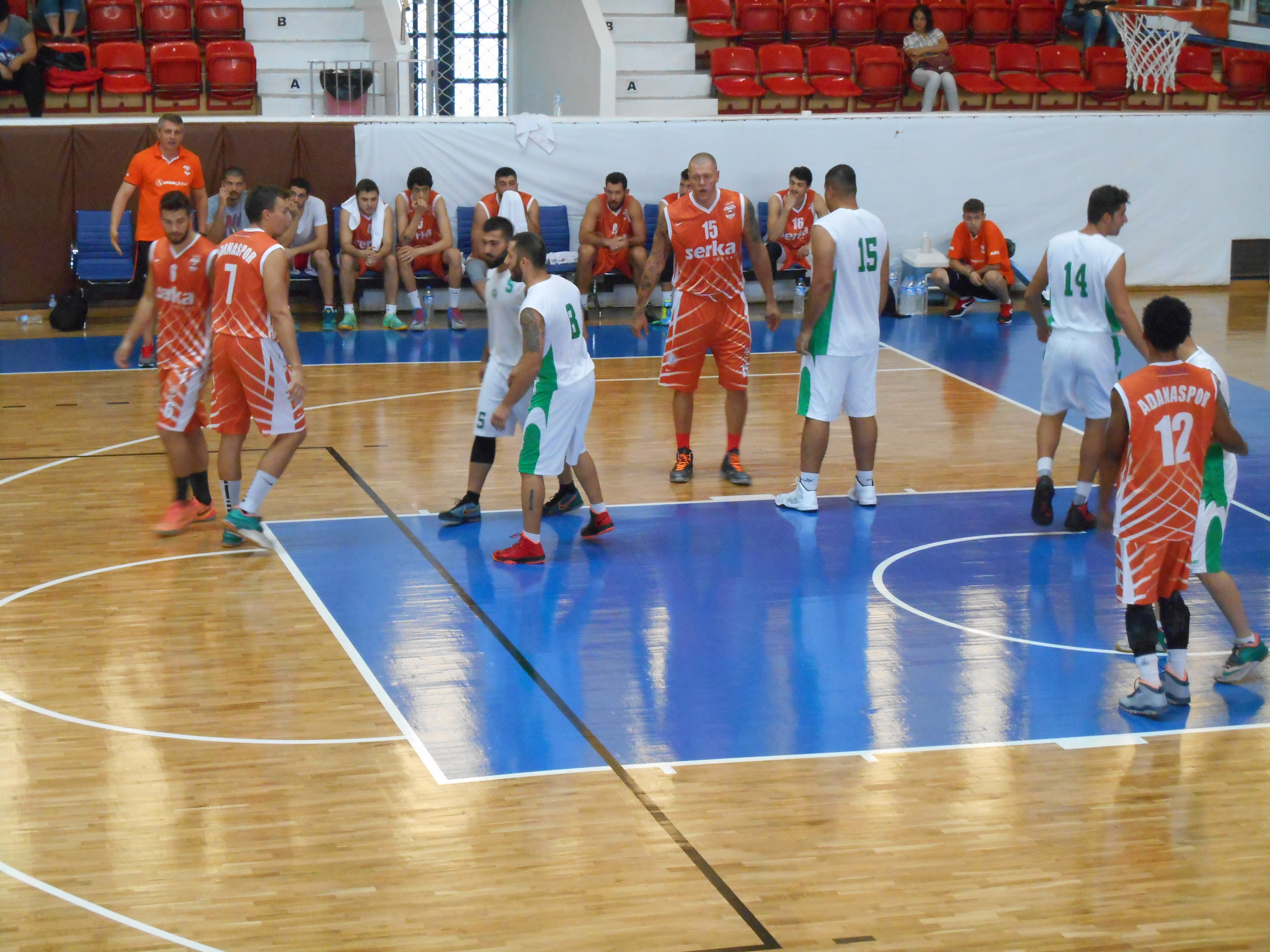
Home game of Adanspor

== Players ==
=== Notable players ===
Note: Flags indicate national team eligibility at FIBA-sanctioned events. Players may hold other non-FIBA nationalities not displayed.

Criteria

To appear in this section a player must have either:

- Set a club record or won an individual award while at the club
- Played at least one official international match for their national team at any time
- Played at least one official NBA match at any time.

- (United States) Terrell Stoglin
- (Latvia) Kaspars Kambala
