= Gelişim Koleji S.K. =

Gelişim Koleji
- Leagues: TBL
- Founded: 2000
- History: Gelişim Koleji (2000-present)
- Arena: Gelişim Koleji Sports Hall
- Capacity: 500
- Location: İzmir, Turkey
- Team colors: Green and Yellow
- President: (Turkey) Serdar Öner
- Head coach: (Turkey) Arda Vekiloğlu
- Website: http://www.gelisimkolejisk.org
Home

Gelişim Koleji Spor Kulübü, more commonly known as Gelişim Koleji, is a Turkish professional basketball club based in İzmir, which plays Turkish Basketball League (TBL). The team was founded by Gelişim College in 2000. Their home arena is Gelişim Koleji Sports Hall, with a capacity of 500 seats.

== Notable players ==
- (Turkey) Kaan İşbilen
