= Bandırma Kırmızı B.K. =

- Leagues: TBL
- Founded: 2005; 20 years ago
- History: Genç Banvitliler B.K. 2005–2011; Bandırma Kırmızı B.K. 2011–present
- Arena: Kara Ali Acar Sport Hall
- Capacity: 3,000
- Location: Bandırma, Turkey
- President: Serhat Eper
- Head coach: Ahmet Gürgen
- Affiliation(s): Bandırma B.İ.K.
- Website: banvitbasketbol
Home

Bandırma Kırmızı B.K. is a professional basketball team that is based in Bandırma, Balıkesir Province, Turkey.

== History ==
Bandırma Kırmızı played in the Turkish Super League, during the 2011–12.

== Arena ==
Bandırma Kırmızı's home arena is the Kara Ali Acar Sport Hall, which has a capacity of 3,000 seats.

== Season by season ==
| Season | Tier | League | Pos. | Turkish Cup |
|---|---|---|---|---|
| 2005–06 | 3 | TB3L | 1st | |
| 2006–07 | 2 | TB2L | 5th | |
| 2007–08 | 2 | TB2L | 7th | |
| 2008–09 | 2 | TB2L | 8th | |
| 2009–10 | 2 | TB2L | 10th | |
| 2010–11 | 2 | TB2L | 1st | |
| 2011–12 | 1 | TBL | 16th | Group Stage |
| 2012–13 | 2 | TB2L | 9th | |
| 2013–14 | 2 | TB2L | 17th | |
| 2014–15 | 3 | TB3L | 2nd | |
| 2015-16 | 2 | TBL | 13th | |
| 2016–17 | 2 | TBL | 10th | |
| 2017–18 | 2 | TBL | 7th | |
| 2018–19 | 2 | TBL | 12th | |
