= İstanbul DSİ S.K. =

İstanbul DSİ
- Leagues: TBL
- Founded: 2012
- History: İstanbul DSİ (2012–present)
- Arena: Caferağa Sports Hall
- Capacity: 1,500
- Location: Istanbul, Turkey
- Team colors: Green and White
- President: Sinan Pulur
- Head coach: Ali Burgul
- Website: www.istanbuldsispor.com
Home	Away

İstanbul DSİ Spor Kulübü, is a Turkish professional basketball club based in Istanbul which plays Turkish Basketball League (TBL). The team was founded by State Hydraulic Works in 2012. Their home arena is Caferağa Sports Hall with a capacity of 1,500 seats.

== Notable players ==
- (Netherlands) Charlon Kloof (1 season: 2014–2015)
