= Gediz Üniversitesi S.K. =

Orkide Gediz Üniversitesi
- Leagues: TBL
- Founded: 2010
- Dissolved: 2016
- History: Gediz Üniversitesi (2010-2014); Orkide Gediz Üniversitesi (2014-2016)
- Arena: Gediz Üniversitesi Sports Hall
- Capacity: 250
- Location: İzmir, Turkey
- Team colors: Red and White
- President: (Turkey) Adnan Yeşildal
- Head coach: (Turkey) Doğan Deniz
- Website: http://gedizbasket.com/
Home

Gediz Üniversitesi Gençlik ve Spor Kulübü, known as Orkide Gediz Üniversitesi for sponsorship reasons, is a Turkish professional basketball club based in İzmir which plays Turkish Basketball League (TBL). The team was founded by Gediz University in 2010. Their home arena is Gediz Üniversitesi Sports Hall with a capacity of 250 seats. The team is sponsored by Orkide which is a liquid oil company in Turkey.
