= Büyükçekmece Basketbol =

Büyükçekmece
- Leagues: Türkiye Basketbol Ligi
- Founded: 2011; 15 years ago
- History: List: Tüyap Büyükçekmece (2011–2015) Demir İnşaat Büyükçekmece (2015–2018) Arel Üniversitesi Büyükçekmece (2018–2020) Büyükçekmece Basketbol (2020–2022) ONVO Büyükçekmece (2022–present)
- Arena: Gazanfer Bilge Sports Hall
- Capacity: 3,000
- Location: Büyükçekmece, Istanbul, Turkey
- Team colors: Blue, white
- President: Coşkun Bülbül
- Head coach: Volkan Ertetik
- Website: Official Twitter Account
Home	Away

Büyükçekmece Basketbol, mostly known as ONVO Büyükçekmece for sponsorship reasons, is a Turkish professional basketball club based in Büyükçekmece, Istanbul which plays in the Turkish Basketball Super League. Their home arena is Gazanfer Bilge Sports Hall with a capacity of 3,000 seats.

== History ==
Tüyap Büyükçekmece was founded in 2011, in Büyükçekmece. The team began playing in the TB3L for 2011-12 season. In 2012-13 season, the team promoted to TB2L as a champion. In their first season in TB2L the team finished ninth and they completed the league. In the 2014–15 season, the team finished fourth of regular season. The team beat Akhisar Belediye in quarter-final. Then the team beat Denizli Basket in semi-final and Tüyap Büyükçekmece reached the TB2L Final. The Final was lost to Yeşilgiresun Belediye, but Tüyap was still promoted to the highest tier.

== Logos ==
Primary logo used from 2011 till 2015

== Season by season ==
Season	Tier	League	Pos.	Turkish Cup	European competitions		
2011–12	3	TB3L					
2012–13	3	TB3L	1st				
2013–14	2	TB2L	9th				
2014–15	2	TB2L	4th				
2015–16	1	BSL	10th				
2016–17	1	BSL	13th		4 FIBA Europe Cup	R16	10–4
2017–18	1	BSL	12th		4 FIBA Europe Cup	R2	10–6
2018–19	1	BSL	12th				
2019–20	1	BSL	–^{1}				
2020–21	1	BSL	13th				
2021–22	1	BSL	12th				
2022–23	1	BSL	10th				
2023–24	1	BSL	10th				
2024–25	1	BSL	8th				
2025–26	1	BSL	16th				

^1 Cancelled due to the COVID-19 pandemic in Europe.

== Players ==
=== Current roster ===
Note: Flags indicate national team eligibility at FIBA-sanctioned events. Players may hold other non-FIBA nationalities not displayed.

ONVO Büyükçekmece roster
Players
Coaches

Pos.	No.	Nat.	Name	Ht.	Age
G	1	(Kosovo)	Bacevac, Edin	1.88 m (6 ft 2 in)	19 – 19 March 2007
PG	2	(United States)	Barnes, Jordan	1.78 m (5 ft 10 in)	29 – 13 September 1997
G	4	(Turkey)	Özel, Kerem	1.83 m (6 ft 0 in)	29 – 9 January 1997
SF	6	(Turkey)	Akkoyun, Gökhan	2.02 m (6 ft 8 in)	31 – 18 June 1995
SF	9	(Turkey)	Baykan, Oğulcan	1.96 m (6 ft 5 in)	30 – 7 January 1996
PG	10	(Turkey)	Celayir, Kutluhan	1.80 m (5 ft 11 in)	25 – 23 November 2000
SG	12	(Turkey)	Baştürk, Mustafa	1.94 m (6 ft 4 in)	30 – 17 January 1996
PF	13	(Turkey)	Bayrak, Ercan	2.05 m (6 ft 9 in)	29 – 9 July 1997
PF	16	(Turkey)	Koyun, Erdinç Alex	2.05 m (6 ft 9 in)	17 – 5 December 2008
C	24	(Turkey)	Tunç, Enes	2.08 m (6 ft 10 in)	28 – 20 January 1998
C	25	(Turkey)	Işık, Bora	2.11 m (6 ft 11 in)	28 – 5 September 1998
SG	35	(Turkey)	Aktuna, Kemal	1.91 m (6 ft 3 in)	31 – 3 February 1995
PG	44	(Turkey)	Öğüt, Can Uğur	1.78 m (5 ft 10 in)	34 – 23 January 1992
F/C	54	(United States)	Ducree, Julien	2.06 m (6 ft 9 in)	29 – 31 March 1997
F	99	(Turkey)	Evran, Cenker	2.03 m (6 ft 8 in)	22 – 29 May 2004

Head coach

- (Turkey) Volkan Ertetik

Assistant coach(es)

- (Kosovo) Andin Rashica
- (Turkey) Tuncay Bostancı
- (Turkey) Taha Altunel

Strength & conditioning coach(es)

- (Turkey) Yasin Karahasan

Team manager

- (Turkey) Can Köken

Legend

- (C) Team captain
- (DC) Dual citizenship
- Injured

- Roster
Updated: November 1, 2026

=== Depth chart ===
Pos.	Starting 5	Bench 1	Bench 2
C	Julien Ducree	Bora Işık	Enes Tunç
PF	Oğulcan Baykan	Cenker Evran	Ercan Bayrak
SF	Mustafa Baştürk	Erdinç Alex Koyun	Kemal Aktuna
SG	Jordan Barnes	Gökhan Akkoyun	Edin Bacevac
PG	Can Uğur Öğüt	Kerem Özel	Kutluhan Celayir

=== Notable players ===
Note: Flags indicate national team eligibility at FIBA-sanctioned events. Players may hold other non-FIBA nationalities not displayed.

Criteria

To appear in this section a player must have either:

- Set a club record or won an individual award while at the club
- Played at least one official international match for their national team at any time
- Played at least one official NBA match at any time.

- (Turkey) İlkan Karaman
- (Turkey) Emircan Koşut
- (Bosnia and Herzegovina) Andrija Stipanović
- (Cameroon) Franck Yangue
- (Croatia) Marin Marić
- (Finland) Erik Murphy
- (United Kingdom) Gabriel Olaseni
- (Kazakhstan) Jerry Johnson
- (Lithuania) Evaldas Kairys
- (Lithuania) Martynas Sajus
- (Mexico) Alex Pérez
- (North Macedonia) Predrag Samardžiski
- (North Macedonia) Vojdan Stojanovski
- (Netherlands) Yannick Franke
- (Netherlands) Keye van der Vuurst de Vries
- (New Zealand) Thomas Abercrombie
- (Romania) Vlad Moldoveanu
- (Senegal) Clevin Hannah
- (Slovenia) Jaka Klobučar
- (Tunisia) Michael Roll
- (Ukraine) Volodymyr Herun
- (United States) Erik Murphy
- (United States) Hilton Armstrong
- (United States) Bracey Wright
- (United States) Devin Williams
- (United States) Andrew Andrews
- (United States) Andrew White
- (United States) Jordon Crawford
- (United States) Brianté Weber
- (United States) Marcquise Reed
- (United States) Malcolm Thomas
- (United States) Jalen Lecque
