= Final Gençlik ve Spor Kulübü =

Turkish basketball team

- Leagues: TBL
- Founded: 2006
- History: Final Gençlik ve Spor Kulübü (2006-present)
- Arena: Naim Süleymanoglu Sports Complex
- Capacity: 2,500
- Location: Bursa, Turkey
- Team colors: Red and White
- Head coach: (Turkey) Berat Gök
- Championships: 1 Federation Cup (2019)
- Website: http://www.finalspor.org
Home	Away

Final Gençlik ve Spor Kulübü, better known as Final Spor, is a Turkish basketball team based in Bursa, Turkey which plays in Turkish Basketball League (TBL). They were founded in 2006 and play their home games at the Naim Süleymanoğlu Sport Complex. They were named after the nearby private school and the team's main sponsor throughout the years, Final Okulları. The club had its most recent success when they won the Turkish Basketball Federation Cup in 2019.

== Roster ==
Nationality	Player Name
(Turkey)	Ali Işık
(Turkey)	Alper Açar
(Turkey)	Arda Konuk
(United States)	Brendan Medley-Bacon
(Turkey)	Cenk Şekeroğlu
(Turkey)	Efe Sarıca
(Turkey)	Egemen Usta
(Turkey)	Erdem İlter
(Turkey)	Evren Demirci
(Turkey)	Gökhan Akkoyun
(Turkey)	Gökhan Aydın
(Turkey)	Recep Doğrusöz
(Turkey)	Sabahattin Göndür

Source : (Updated : October 7, 2024)

== Notable players ==
- (United States) Lennard Freeman
- (United States) Tyrece Radford
- (United States) Deshon Taylor
