= Akhisar Belediyespor (basketball) =

Akhisar Belediyesispor
- Leagues: TBL
- Founded: 2008 (re-founded 2019)
- History: Akhisar Belediyesispor (2008–present)
- Arena: Akhisar Belediye Sports Hall
- Capacity: 1,800
- Location: Akhisar, Turkey
- Team colors: Green and White
- President: (Turkey) Hüseyin Eryüksel
- Head coach: (Turkey) Zafer Aktaş
- Website: http://www.akhisarspor.net/
Home	Away

Akhisar Belediyespor is a Turkish professional basketball club based in Akhisar, Manisa which plays Turkish Basketball League (TBL). It is a branch of the multi-sports club of Akhisar Belediyespor. The team was founded by Akhisar Municipality in 2008 and re-founded in 2019. Their home arena is Akhisar Belediye Sports Hall with a capacity of 1,800 seats.
