= Turkish Basketball Second League =

Turkish basketball league

Turkish Basketball Second League (TB2L)
- Formerly: Turkish Basketball Third League (TB3L)
- Sport: Basketball
- Founded: 2012
- No. of teams: 21
- Country: Turkey
- Confederation: Turkish Basketball Federation
- Most recent champion: Sakarya BBSK (1st title)
- Level on pyramid: 3
- Promotion to: TBL
- Relegation to: EBBL
- Website: Link

The Turkish Basketball Second League, also called TB2L, is the third-tier level league of professional club basketball in Turkey. The league was previously called the Turkish Basketball Third League (TB3L).

== Format and promotion and relegation ==
Regular Season Competitions: Twenty-one teams are divided into two groups (A and B), one group of ten teams and one group of eleven teams. Regular season competitions are played in two round-robin format, with away games. Based on the points tally after these competitions:

In each group, a total of four teams ranked first and second in each group qualify for the Play-Off Quarterfinals.

A total of eight teams ranked third, fourth, fifth, and sixth in their groups qualify for the Play-Off Qualifying Round to qualify for the Play-Off Quarterfinals.

The teams finishing seventh, eighth, and ninth in the ten team group, and the seven teams finishing seventh, eighth, ninth, and tenth in the eleven team group, will complete the season.

The two teams finishing last in their group will lose their right to play in the TB2L the following season.

In the Play-Off Elimination Round, the paired teams will face off in a two elimination match, one at home and one at their opponent's home turf.

Play-Off Quarterfinal Matches are played between the four teams that finished in the top two places in their groups at the end of the regular season and the four teams that advanced to the next round as a result of the Play-Off Elimination Round, each with two wins.

Play-Off Semifinals are played between the four teams that advance from the Play-Off Quarterfinals, with three wins. The two winning teams qualify for the Turkish Basketball League (TBL). These two teams then play a single-game final to determine the champion.

== Seasons ==
Season	Champions	Runners-up
2012–13	Büyükçekmece	AŞUT Mersin Basketbol
2013–14	Gediz Üniversitesi	İ.T.Ü.
2014–15	Acıbadem Üniversitesi	Bandırma Kırmızı
2015–16	Samsun Büyükşehir Belediyesi Anakent	Bursaspor
2016–17	Orman Gençlik	Karesi Spor
2017–18	Final Spor	Manisa Büyükşehir Belediyespor
2018–19	Merkezefendi Belediyesi Denizli Basket	Fethiye Belediyespor
2020–21	TED Ankara Kolejliler	Mersin BBGSK
2021–22	Fenerbahçe Koleji Safiport	Çağdaş Bodrumspor
2022–23	Çayırova Belediyespor	Kapaklı Spor
2023–24	Ayos Spor	Konya BBSK
2024–25	Göztepe	Kahramanmaraş İstiklal
2025–26	Sakarya BBSK	Keçiören Belediyesi Bağlum

== Current clubs (2025–26 season) ==
Team	City
A Group
Akhisar Belediye	Manisa
Çiftlikköy Belediyespor	Yalova
Etimesgut Belediyesi	Ankara
High Touch HT	Istanbul
İBB Spor	Istanbul
İlkler Şehri Uşak	Uşak
İ.T.Ü.	Istanbul
Karatay Belediyespor	Konya
Kerasusspor	Giresun
Türk Telekom Gelişim	Ankara
B Group
ABB Egospor	Ankara
Adana Sertaşspor	Adana
Beylikdüzü Basketbol İhtisas	Istanbul
Çorlu Belediyesi	Tekirdağ
Ege Üniversitesi Daçka	İzmir
Eskişehir Birey Koleji	Eskişehir
Güngören Doruk	Istanbul
Keçiören Belediyesi Bağlum	Ankara
Kütahya Belediyespor	Kütahya
Sakarya BBSK	Sakarya
Teşvikiye	Istanbul
