= Türkiye Basketbol Ligi =

Turkish second tier professional basketball league

- Founded: 1969; 57 years ago
- First season: 1969–70
- Country: Turkey
- Confederation: FIBA Europe
- Number of teams: 18
- Level on pyramid: 2
- Promotion to: Basketbol Süper Ligi
- Relegation to: TB2L
- International cup: TBL Federation Cup
- Current champions: Çayırova Belediyesi (1st title) (2025–26)
- Most championships: Tofaş (5 titles)
- Website: Link
- 2026–27 Türkiye Basketbol Ligi

The Turkish Basketball First League (Turkish: Türkiye Basketbol Ligi; TBL), is the second-tier level league of professional club basketball in Turkey. The league was previously known as Turkish Basketball Second League (TB2L).

== Format and promotion and relegation ==
There are a total of 18 teams participating in the league for the 2023-24 TBL season. Each team plays each other in their group twice during the regular season. Team finishes at first place promotes to the top-tier level Turkish Basketball Super League (BSL) for the next season, teams ranked 2nd place to 9th place, compete in playoff format and winner of the playoff also promotes. The last two teams are relegated to the third-tier level Turkish Basketball Second League.

== League champions and promoted teams ==
Season	Champion	Promoted team(s)	Champion's Coach
1969–70	**MKE Ankaragücü**	**MKE Ankaragücü**	
1970–71	**Şekerspor**	**Şekerspor**	
1971–72	**Kadıköyspor**	**Kadıköyspor**	
1972–73	**Samsunspor**	**Samsunspor**, Adana Demirspor	
1973–74	**Eczacıbaşı**	**Eczacıbaşı**, Karşıyaka	
1974–75	**Adana Demirspor**	**Adana Demirspor**, ODTÜ	
1975–76	**Yenişehir**	**Yenişehir**, Tofaş	
1976–77	**Muhafızgücü**	**Muhafızgücü**, Ziraat Fakültesi	
1977–78	**Efes Pilsen**	**Efes Pilsen**, Taçspor	
1978–79	**İTÜ**	**İTÜ**, TED Ankara Kolejliler	
1979–80	**Muhafızgücü**	**Muhafızgücü**, Güney Sanayi, Mülkiye, ODTÜ	
1980–81	**Antbirlik**	**Antbirlik**, Çukurova Sanayi	
1981–82	**TED Ankara Kolejliler**	**TED Ankara Kolejliler**, Oyak Renault, Silahlı Kuvvetler Gücü	
1982–83	**Ankara DSİ**	Ziraat Fakültesi	
1983–84	**Anadolu Hisarı İdman Yurdu**	**Anadolu Hisarı İdman Yurdu**, Hilalspor, TED Ankara Kolejliler	
1984–85	**Hortaş Yenişehir**	**Hortaş Yenişehir**, Tarsus İdman Yurdu	
1985–86	**Beslenspor**	**Beslenspor**, Nasaşspor, Şekerspor	
1986–87	**Paşabahçe**	**Paşabahçe**, Hilalspor	
1987–88	**Tekirdağ Büyük Salat**	**Tekirdağ Büyük Salat**, Beykozspor	
1988–89	**Beşiktaş**	**Beşiktaş**, Nasaşspor	
1989–90	**Tofaş SAS**	**Tofaş SAS**, TED Ankara Kolejliler	
1990–91	**Eczacıbaşı**	**Eczacıbaşı**, PTT	
1991–92	**Meysuspor**	**Meysuspor**, Darüşşafaka, Konyaspor, Ortaköyspor, Oyak Renault, Yıldırımspor	
1992–93	**Çimtur**	Antalyaspor, Bakırköyspor, Ülkerspor	
1993–94	**Vestel**	Antbirlik, Meysuspor, Taçspor	
1994–95	**Tuborg Pilsener**	**Tuborg Pilsener**, Netaş	
1995–96	**TED Ankara Kolejliler**	**TED Ankara Kolejliler**, İTÜ, Konyaspor	
1996–97	**Oyak Renault**	**Oyak Renault**, Muratpaşa Belediyespor	
1997–98	**Kuşadasıspor**	**Kuşadasıspor**, TED Ankara Kolejliler	
1998–99	**Emlak Bankası**	İTÜ	
1999–2000	**Karagücü**	Altay, Antbirlik, Büyük Kolej	
2000–01	**İTÜ**	**İTÜ**, Oyak Renault	—N/a
2001–02	**İzmir BŞB**	Göztepe, Tekelspor	—N/a
2002–03	**Tofaş**	**Tofaş**, Tuborg Pilsener	—N/a
2003–04	**Erdemirspor**	**Erdemirspor**, Banvitspor	—N/a
2004–05	**Mersin BŞB**	**Mersin BŞB**, Beykoz	(Turkey) Rebah Sıdalı
2005–06	**Tofaş**	**Tofaş**, Alpella, Oyak Renault, Selçuk Üniversitesi, TED Ankara Kolejliler	(Turkey) Tolga Öngören
2006–07	**Antalya BŞB**	**Antalya BŞB**, Kepez Belediyespor	(Turkey) Ahmet Kandemir
2007–08	**Erdemirspor**	**Erdemirspor**, Aliağa Belediyespor	(Turkey) Gökhan Taştimur
2008–09	**Tofaş**	**Tofaş**, Bornova Belediyespor	(Bosnia and Herzegovina) Nihat İziç
2009–10	**Trabzonspor Basketbol**	Olin Edirne, Trabzonspor BK	(Turkey) Alaeddin Yakan
2010–11	**Genç Banvitliler**	**Genç Banvitliler**, Hacettepe Üniversitesi	(Turkey) Ahmet Gürgen
2011–12	**TED Ankara Kolejliler**	**TED Ankara Kolejliler**, Gaziantep BŞB	(Turkey) Murat Özyer
2012–13	**Trabzonspor BK**	**Trabzonspor BK**, Mackolik.com Uşak Üniversitesi, Torku Selçuk Üniversitesi	(Turkey) Hasan Özmeriç
2013–14	**Darüşşafaka Doğuş**	**Darüşşafaka Doğuş**, İstanbul BŞB	(Turkey) Orhun Ene
2014–15	**Yeşilgiresun Belediye**	**Yeşilgiresun Belediye**, Tüyap Büyükçekmece Basketbol	(Turkey) Ahmet Kandemir
2015–16	**Tofaş**	**Tofaş**, BEST Balıkesir	(Turkey) Orhun Ene
2016–17	**Astra Group Sakarya BŞB**	**Astra Group Sakarya BŞB**, Eskişehir Basket	(Turkey) Selçuk Ernak
2017–18	**Türk Telekom**	**Türk Telekom**, **Afyon Belediye**, Bahçeşehir Koleji	(Turkey) Can Sevim
2018–19	**Bursaspor Durmazlar**	**Bursaspor Durmazlar**, **OGM Ormanspor**, sigortam.net İTÜ BB	(Turkey) Arda Vekiloğlu
2019–20	—N/a^{1}	Lokman Hekim Fethiye Belediyespor, Petkim Spor	—N/a^{1}
2020–21	**Merkezefendi Belediyesi Denizli Basket**	**Merkezefendi Belediyesi Denizli Basket**, **Semt77 Yalovaspor**	(Turkey) Zafer Aktaş
2021–22	**Manisa BŞB**	**Manisa BŞB**, **Beysu Konyaspor**	(Turkey) Ceyhun Cabadak
2022–23	**Çağdaş Bodrumspor**	**Çağdaş Bodrumspor**, **Yılyak Samsunspor**	(Turkey) Ender Arslan
2023–24	**Semt77 Yalovaspor**	**Semt77 Yalovaspor**, **Mersin BŞB**	(Turkey) Faruk Beşok
2024–25	**Trabzonspor**	**Trabzonspor**, **Esenler Erokspor**	(Turkey) Faruk Beşok
2025–26	**Çayırova Belediyesi**	**Çayırova Belediyesi**, **Parmos Bordo**	(Turkey) Ender Arslan

Clubs in bold are champions.

- **^Note 1** – Season was cancelled due to the coronavirus pandemic in Turkey.

== Turkish Basketball League Federation Cup ==
Year	Champions	Result	Runners-up
2012–13	Bandırma Kırmızı	73–64	Torku Selçuk Üniversitesi
2013–14	İstanbul BŞB	94–41	Akhisar Belediyespor
2014–15	Best Balıkesir	102–89	Sinpaş Denizli Basket
2015–16	Tofaş	90–69	Akhisar Belediyespor
2016–17	Nesine.com Eskişehir Basket	84–79	İstanbul Beylikdüzü
2017–18	Bahçeşehir Koleji	89–59	Türk Telekom
2018–19	Mamak Bld. Yeni Mamak Spor	75–68	Bursaspor
2019–20	Final Gençlik	97–95	Petkim Spor
2020–21	Sigortam.net	84–76	Semt77 Yalovaspor
2021–22	Manisa BŞB	78–77	Samsunspor
2022–23	TED Ankara Kolejliler	113–107	Samsunspor
2024–25	Esenler Erokspor	69–66	Konya BBSK
2025–26	Çayırova Belediyesi	70–52	Konya BBSK

== Current clubs ==
2026–27 Türkiye Basketbol Ligi (TBL) Teams
Team	City	District	Arena	Capacity
Balıkesir BB	Balıkesir	Karesi	Kurtdereli Spor Salonu	1.500
Büyükçekmece Basketbol	Istanbul	Büyükçekmece	Gazanfer Bilge Sports Hall	2.500
Cedi Osman Basketbol	Istanbul	Küçükçekmece	Küçükçekmece Halkalı Spor Salonu	2.500
Darüşşafaka	Istanbul	Sarıyer	Darüşşafaka Ayhan Şahenk Sports Hall	3.500
Fenerbahçe Gelişim	Istanbul	Ataşehir	Fenerbahçe Metro Enerji Spor Salonu	2.500
Final Spor	Bursa	Nilüfer	N.Süleymenoğlu S.salonu	2.100
Gaziantep Basketbol	Gaziantep	Şahinbey	Karataş Şahinbey Sport Hall	6.400
Göztepe Isonem	İzmir	Göztepe	Altındağ Atatürk Spor Kompleksi	1.920
iLab Basketbol	Istanbul	Sarıyer	BJK Akatlar Arena	3.200
Keçiören Belediyesi Bağlum	Ankara	Keçiören	Taha Akgül Spor Salonu	
Kipaş KBB	Kahramanmaraş	Onikişubat	Kahramanmaraş Merkez Spor Salonu	2.500
Konya BB	Konya	Selçuklu	Selçuklu Belediyesi Spor Salonu	4.200
Mersin MSK	Mersin	Yenişehir	Servet Tazegül Arena	6.499
MKE Ankaragücü Basketbol	Ankara	Mamak	Mamak Belediyesi Hidayet Türkoğlu Spor Salonu	4.200
OGM Ormanspor	Ankara	Yenimahalle	M. Sait Zarifoğlu Spor Salonu	2.000
TED Ankara Kolejliler	Ankara	Gölbaşı	Gölbaşı Spor Salonu	
Yalova Harem Spor	Yalova	Merkez	90. Yıl Spor Salonu	2.000
