= 2024–25 Galatasaray S.K. (men's basketball) season =

Galatasaray
2024–25 season
- President: Dursun Özbek
- Head coach: Yakup Sekizkök
- Arena: Basketbol Gelişim Merkezi
- Basketbol Süper Ligi: 7th seed
- Playoffs: Quarterfinals
- Basketball Champions League: Runners-up
- Turkish Basketball Cup: Semifinals

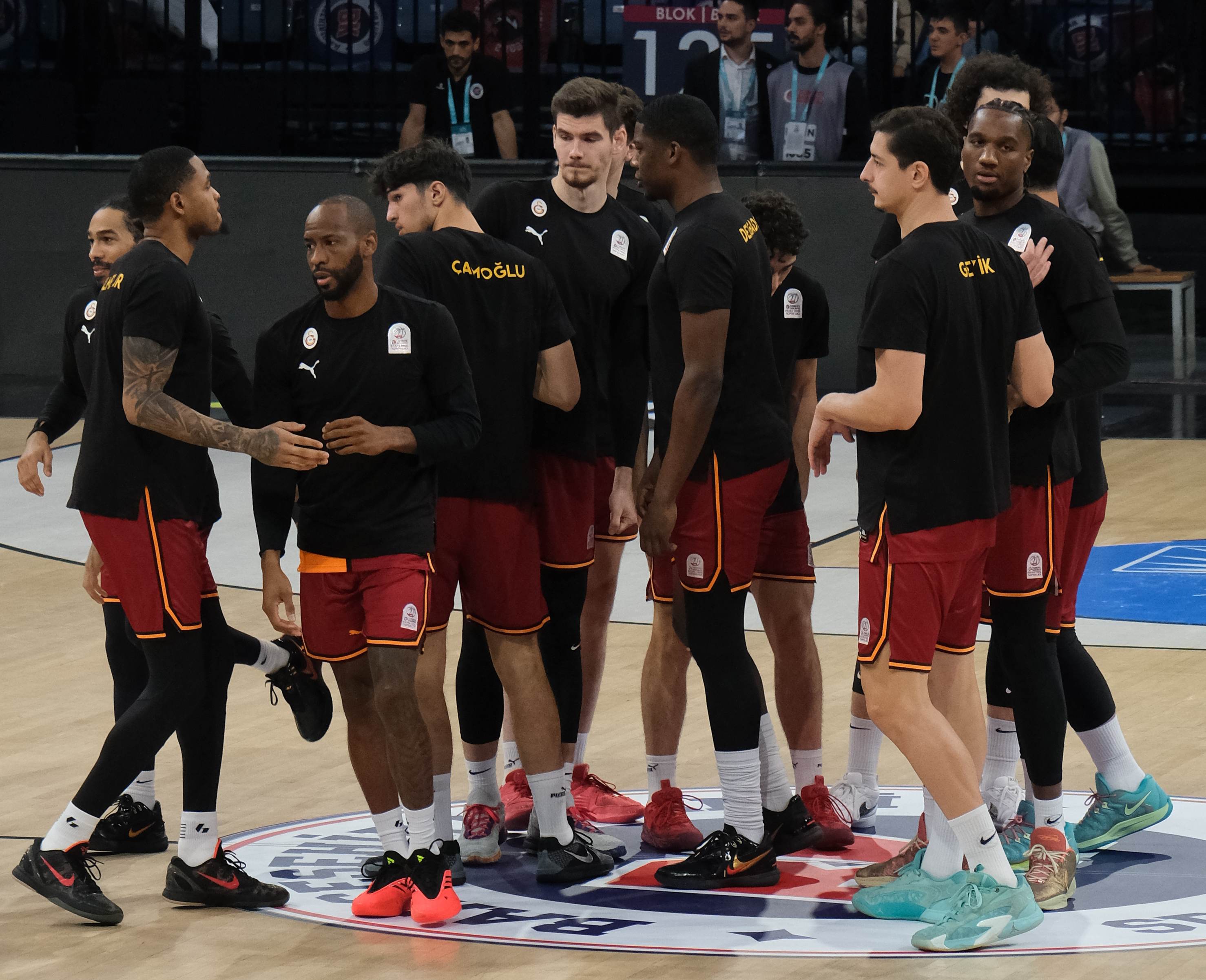
Galatasaray roster in October 2024

The 2024–25 season is Galatasaray's 113th season in the existence of the club. The team plays in the Basketball Super League and in the Basketball Champions League.

== Season overview ==
=== Pre-season ===
On 11 August, The first stage program of the Galatasaray Men's Basketball Team's 2024–25 season preparation program has been announced.

On 20 August, Turkish Basketball Super League 2024–25 Season fixtures have been announced.

On 20 August, Galatasaray will play its matches at the Basketbol Gelişim Merkezi in the 2024–25 season.

On 7 September, The second stage preparation program has been announced.

== Players ==
=== Current roster ===
Note: Flags indicate national team eligibility at FIBA-sanctioned events. Players may hold other non-FIBA nationalities not displayed.

Galatasaray roster
Players
Coaches

Pos.	No.	Nat.	Name	Ht.	Wt.	Age
PG	0	(United States)	Livingston II, Otis	1.80 m (5 ft 11 in)	79 kg (174 lb)	30 – 12 October 1996
PF	2	(United States)	Young, Michael	2.03 m (6 ft 8 in)	104 kg (229 lb)	32 – 5 September 1994
G	3	(United States)	Wallace, Tyrone	1.96 m (6 ft 5 in)	86 kg (190 lb)	32 – 10 June 1994
PF	6	(Turkey)	Kabaca, Sadık Emir	2.08 m (6 ft 10 in)	95 kg (209 lb)	25 – 3 December 2000
PG	7	(United States)	Cummings, Will	1.88 m (6 ft 2 in)	84 kg (185 lb)	34 – 7 October 1992
PF	8	(Latvia)	Blumbergs, Roberts	2.08 m (6 ft 10 in)	100 kg (220 lb)	28 – 29 April 1998
PF	9	(Turkey)	Geyik, Samet	2.06 m (6 ft 9 in)	98 kg (216 lb)	33 – 12 January 1993
SG	12	(United States)	Palmer, James	1.96 m (6 ft 5 in)	94 kg (207 lb)	30 – 31 July 1996
PF	14	(Turkey)	Vatan, Efe	2.07 m (6 ft 9 in)		22 – 13 April 2004
C	15	(Nigeria)	Izundu, Ebuka	2.08 m (6 ft 10 in)	105 kg (231 lb)	30 – 28 June 1996
G	17	(Turkey)	Erdem, Kerem			20 – 24 March 2006
G	19	(Turkey)	Tuncer, Buğrahan	1.93 m (6 ft 4 in)	90 kg (198 lb)	33 – 23 March 1993
SG	24	(Turkey)	Alişan, Yaman	1.98 m (6 ft 6 in)		20 – 27 June 2006
C	31	(Dominican Republic)	Delgado, Ángel	2.08 m (6 ft 10 in)	111 kg (245 lb)	31 – 20 November 1994
G	32	(United States)	Gray, Rob	1.86 m (6 ft 1 in)	84 kg (185 lb)	32 – 3 April 1994
G/F	61	(Turkey)	Köksal, Göksenin (C)	1.97 m (6 ft 6 in)	93 kg (205 lb)	35 – 8 January 1991
PG	88	(Turkey)	Korkmaz, Can (injured)	1.88 m (6 ft 2 in)	83 kg (183 lb)	34 – 21 October 1992

Head coach

- (Turkey) Yakup Sekizkök

Assistant coach(es)

- (Turkey) Gökhan Turan
- (Turkey) Cem Güven

Athletic trainer(s)

- (Turkey) Yasin Aydın

Physiotherapist(s)

- (Turkey) Ali Can Kaşlı
- (Turkey) Mümin Balcıoğulları

Team manager

- (Turkey) Ömer Yalçınkaya
- (Turkey) İbrahim Tilki

Legend

- (C) Team captain
- Injured

- Roster
Updated: March 28, 2025

=== Depth chart ===
Pos.	Starting 5	Bench 1	Bench 2	Bench 3	Inactive
C	Ángel Delgado	Ebuka Izundu	Samet Geyik
PF	Roberts Blumbergs	Michael Young	Sadık Emir Kabaca	Efe Vatan
SF	James Palmer Jr.	Göksenin Köksal
SG	Tyrone Wallace	Buğrahan Tuncer		Yaman Alişan
PG	Otis Livingston II	Will Cummings	Rob Gray	Kerem Erdem	Can Korkmaz (injured)

(colours: Turkish or homegrown players; foreign players)

=== Squad changes ===
==== In ====
No.	Pos.	Nat.	Name	Age	Moving from		Type	Ends	Transfer fee	Date	Source
4	G	(United States)	David Efianayi	28	Petkim Spor	(Turkey)	1 years	June 2025	Free	11 June 2024	
15	C	(Nigeria)	Ebuka Izundu	27	EWE Baskets Oldenburg	(Germany)	2 years	June 2026	Free	13 June 2024	
12	SG	(United States)	James Palmer	27	Türk Telekom	(Turkey)	1 years	June 2025	Free	15 June 2024	
8	PF	(Latvia)	Roberts Blumbergs	26	Aris	(Greece)	1 years	June 2025	Free	20 June 2024	
24	SG	(Turkey)	Yaman Alişan	18	Darüşşafaka	(Turkey)	2 years	June 2026	Free	28 June 2024	
31	C	(Dominican Republic)	Ángel Delgado	29	Beşiktaş	(Turkey)	1 years	June 2025	Free	2 July 2024	
0	PG	(United States)	Otis Livingston II	27	Würzburg Baskets	(Germany)	1 years	June 2025	Free	3 July 2024	
7	PG	(United States)	Will Cummings	31	Hapoel Tel Aviv	(Israel)	1 years	June 2025	Free	5 July 2024	
88	PG	(Turkey)	Can Korkmaz	31	Darüşşafaka	(Turkey)	1 years	June 2025	Free	27 September 2024	
2	PF	(United States)	Michael Young	30	Anyang Jung Kwan Jang Red Boosters	(South Korea)	6 months	June 2025	Free	18 December 2024	
3	G	(United States)	Tyrone Wallace	30	Žalgiris	(Lithuania)	6 months	June 2025	Free	17 January 2025	
32	G	(United States)	Rob Gray	30	Scafati Basket	(Italy)	2 months	June 2025	Free	28 March 2025	

==== Out ====
No.	Pos.	Nat.	Name	Age	Moving to		Type	Transfer fee	Date	Source
5	G	(Turkey)	İsmet Akpınar	29	Türk Telekom	(Turkey)	Mutual agreement	Free	3 June 2024	
7	F/C	(Bosnia and Herzegovina)	Miralem Halilović	32	Dinamo Sassari	(Italy)	End of contract	Free	3 June 2024	
8	PG	(Bulgaria)	Dee Bost	34	Indios de Mayagüez	(Puerto Rico)	End of contract	Free	3 June 2024	
2	PG	(United States)	Corey Walden	31	Força Lleida	(Spain)	End of contract	Free	29 June 2024	
10	SG	(Slovenia)	Klemen Prepelič	31	Dubai Basketball	(United Arab Emirates)	End of contract	Free	29 June 2024	
15	SF	(United Kingdom)	Akwasi Yeboah	27	Trapani Shark	(Italy)	End of contract	Free	30 June 2024	
33	C	(United States)	David McCormack	24	Olimpia Milano	(Italy)	End of contract	Free	30 June 2024	
5	PF	(Turkey)	Karahan Tuan Efeoğlu	20	Petkim Spor	(Turkey)	Mutual agreement	Free	3 October 2024	
4	G	(United States)	David Efianayi	29	Mersin MSK	(Turkey)	Mutual agreement	Free	9 January 2025	

==== Confirmed ====
No.	Pos.	Nat.	Name	Age	Moving from		Type	Ends	Transfer fee	Date	Source
19	G	(Turkey)	Buğrahan Tuncer	31	Anadolu Efes	(Turkey)	2 + 1 years	June 2025	Free	24 June 2023	

== Club ==
=== Staff ===
As of 15 August 2024

Staff member	Position
Ömer Yalçınkaya	General Manager
İbrahim Tilki	Team Manager
Yakup Sekizkök	Head Coach
Cem Güven	Assistant Coach
Gökhan Turan	Assistant Coach
Batuhan Aybars Aksu	Assistant Coach
Cenk Alyüz	Assistant Coach
Yasin Aydın	Conditioner
Emir Akmanlı	Communication and Media Specialist
Sinan Üstündağ	Doctor
Mümin Balcıoğulları	Physiotherapist
Ali Can Kaşlı	Physiotherapist
Burak Kozan	Masseur
Adnan Güney	Material Manager
Yunus Ün	Foreign Relations Officer
Vahit Yılmaz	Transportation Manager

=== Uniform ===
Home	Away	Third

=== Sponsorship and kit manufacturers ===
- Supplier: Puma
- Name sponsor: —
- Main sponsor: —
- Back sponsor: MCT Technic
- Sleeve sponsor: —
- Lateral sponsor: —
- Short sponsor: Zeren Metal
- Socks sponsor: —

=== Sponsorship naming ===
- Galatasaray Ekmas (until 11 June 2024)

== Pre-season and friendlies ==
=== Friendly match ===
28 August 2024 Friendly	Galatasaray (Turkish Basketball Federation)	86–68	(Turkish Basketball Federation) Onvo Büyükçekmece Basketbol	Zeytinburnu, Istanbul, Turkey
13:00 TRT (UTC+3)
		Report 1 Report 2		Arena: Basketbol Gelişim Merkezi

31 August 2024 Friendly	Trapani Shark (Italian Basketball Federation)	102–77	(Turkish Basketball Federation) Galatasaray	Bormio, Sondrio, Italy
19:30 TRT (UTC+3)
		Boxscore

2 September 2024 Friendly	Monaco (French Federation of Basketball)	65–70	(Turkish Basketball Federation) Galatasaray	Bormio, Sondrio, Italy
19:00 TRT (UTC+3)
		Report 1 Report 2

4 September 2024 Friendly	Galatasaray (Turkish Basketball Federation)	85–79	(German Basketball Federation) Fraport Skyliners	Bormio, Sondrio, Italy
19:00 TRT (UTC+3)
		Report 1 Report 2

10 September 2024 17. TÜBAD Mehmet Baturalp Turnuvası	Galatasaray (Turkish Basketball Federation)	75–88	(Turkish Basketball Federation) Anadolu Efes	Muratpaşa, Antalya, Turkey
20:00 TRT (UTC+3)
		Report 1 Report 2		Arena: Cosmos Sports Center

11 September 2024 17. TÜBAD Mehmet Baturalp Turnuvası	Karşıyaka (Turkish Basketball Federation)	83–71	(Turkish Basketball Federation) Galatasaray	Muratpaşa, Antalya, Turkey
15:30 TRT (UTC+3)
		Report 1 Report 2		Arena: Cosmos Sports Center

14 September 2024 Friendly	Galatasaray (Turkish Basketball Federation)	79–85	(Turkish Basketball Federation) Bursaspor Basketbol	Zeytinburnu, Istanbul, Turkey
14:00 TRT (UTC+3)
		Report 1 Report 2		Arena: Basketbol Gelişim Merkezi

17 September 2024 Friendly	Galatasaray (Turkish Basketball Federation)	73–82	(Turkish Basketball Federation) Türk Telekom	Zeytinburnu, Istanbul, Turkey
15:00 TRT (UTC+3)
		Report 1 Report 2		Arena: Basketbol Gelişim Merkezi

19 September 2024 Friendly	Onvo Büyükçekmece Basketbol (Turkish Basketball Federation)	Cancelled	(Turkish Basketball Federation) Galatasaray	Beylikdüzü, Istanbul, Turkey
		Boxscore		Arena: Beylikdüzü Spor Salonu

24 September 2024 Friendly	Galatasaray (Turkish Basketball Federation)	56–85	(Hellenic Basketball Federation) Panathinaikos	Ataköy, Istanbul, Turkey
20:00 TRT (UTC+3)	Scoring by quarter: 12–17, 22–17, 11–24, 11–27
		Report 1 Report 2		Arena: Sinan Erdem Dome

25 February 2025 Friendly	Darüşşafaka Lassa (Turkish Basketball Federation)	81–79	(Turkish Basketball Federation) Galatasaray	Istanbul, Turkey
		Boxscore		Arena: Ayhan Şahenk Sports Hall

== Competitions ==
=== Overall ===
Competition	Started round	Final position / round	First match	Last match
Basketbol Süper Ligi	Round 1	Quarterfinals	5 October 2024	1 June 2025
Basketball Champions League	Round 1	Runners-up	1 October 2024	11 May 2025
Turkish Basketball Cup	Quarterfinals	Semifinals	11 February 2025	14 February 2025

Source: Competitions

=== Overview ===
Competition	Record							
Competition	Pld	W	D	L	PF	PA	PD	Win %
Basketbol Süper Ligi	33	15	0	18	2,825	2,882	−57	45.45
Basketball Champions League	19	13	0	6	1,615	1,528	+87	68.42
Turkish Basketball Cup	2	1	0	1	171	177	−6	50.00
Total	54	29	0	25	4,611	4,587	+24	53.70

Source: Competitions

=== Basketbol Süper Ligi ===
==== League table ====
Pos	Team	Pld	W	L	PF	PA	PD	Pts	Qualification or relegation
5	Bahçeşehir Koleji	30	18	12	2501	2383	+118	48	Advance to playoffs
6	Mersin MSK	30	16	14	2484	2551	−67	46	Advance to playoffs
7	Galatasaray	30	14	16	2575	2594	−19	44	Advanced to play-in
8	ONVO Büyükçekmece	30	13	17	2552	2566	−14	43	Advanced to play-in
9	Bursaspor Yörsan	30	13	17	2568	2689	−121	43	Advanced to play-in

Source: Basketbol Süper Ligi

==== Results summary ====
Overall						Home					Away				
Pld	W	L	PF	PA	PD	W	L	PF	PA	PD	W	L	PF	PA	PD
30	14	16	2575	2594	−19	9	6	1327	1295	+32	5	10	1248	1299	−51

Last updated: complete.
Source: TBF.org.tr

==== Results by round ====
Round	1	2	3	4	5	6	7	8	9	10	11	12	13	14	15	16	17	18	19	20	21	22	23	24	25	26	27	28	29	30
Ground	A	H	A	H	A	H	H	A	H	A	H	A	H	A	H	H	A	H	A	H	A	A	H	A	H	A	H	A	H	A
Result	L	L	W	W	L	W	W	W	W	W	W	W	W	L	L	L	L	W	L	W	L	L	L	W	W	L	L	L	L	L
Position	9	13	10	9	10	9	7	6	6	6	5	4	3	4	4	5	5	5	5	5	5	6	5	6	6	6	6	6	7	7

Source: TBF.org.tr
A = Away; H = Home; W = Win; L = Loss

==== Matches ====
Win Loss

Note: All times are TRT (UTC+3) as listed by Turkish Basketball Federation.

5 October 2024 1	Türk Telekom	72–70	Galatasaray	Ulus, Ankara
18:00 TRT (UTC+3)	Scoring by quarter: 11–22, 18–22, 20–13, 23–13
	Pts: Alexander, Hanlan 18; Rebs: Alexander, Durmaz; Asts: Tunca 9 PIR: Alexander 21	Boxscore; Report	Pts: Palmer 20; Rebs: Delgado 6 Asts: Cummings 8 PIR: Palmer 21	Arena: Ankara Arena; Referees: Özlem Yalman, Hüseyin Çelik, Mesut Öztürk

13 October 2024 2	Galatasaray	76–80	Tofaş	Zeytinburnu, Istanbul
15:30 TRT (UTC+3)	Scoring by quarter: 22–24, 23–19, 14–20, 17–17
	Pts: Livingston II 18; Rebs: Delgado 13; Asts: Cummings 6 PIR: Delgado 18	Boxscore; Report	Pts: Reed 20; Rebs: Thompson 11; Asts: Pérez 5 PIR: Reed 20	Arena: Basketbol Gelişim Merkezi; Referees: Zafer Yılmaz, Seher Ayşe Nur Yazıcıoğlu, Halil Erkoç

20 October 2024 3	Bahçeşehir Koleji	80–86	Galatasaray	Ataköy, Bakırköy, Istanbul
18:00 TRT (UTC+3)	Scoring by quarter: 20–18, 17–21, 26–26, 17–21
	Pts: Hazer 20; Rebs: Simonović 8 Asts: Smith 4 PIR: Bouteille 19	Boxscore; Report	Pts: Delgado, Palmer 14; Rebs: Delgado 11; Asts: Delgado 4 PIR: Delgado 27	Arena: Sinan Erdem Dome; Referees: Can Mavisu, Alper Altuğ Köselerli, Kerem Yılmaz

28 October 2024 4	Galatasaray	84–78	Yukatel Merkezefendi	Zeytinburnu, Istanbul
20:30 TRT (UTC+3)	Scoring by quarter: 19–18, 16–20, 20–25, 29–15
	Pts: Tuncer 23; Rebs: Delgado 10; Asts: Tuncer 5 PIR: Tuncer 25	Boxscore; Report	Pts: Lomažs 22; Rebs: Olmaz 10; Asts: Cooper 6 PIR: Lomažs 20	Arena: Basketbol Gelişim Merkezi; Referees: Ali Şakacı, Orhan Çağrı Hekimoğlu, Murat Ciner

2 November 2024 5	Karşıyaka	94–81	Galatasaray	Karşıyaka, İzmir
18:00 TRT (UTC+3)	Scoring by quarter: 23–14, 23–23, 22–22, 26–22
	Pts: Webb III 20; Rebs: Jefferson 8 Asts: Sipahi 13; PIR: Jefferson 23	Boxscore; Report	Pts: Livingston II 28; Rebs: Livingston II, Tuncer 5 Asts: Tuncer 7 PIR: Livingston II 31	Arena: Karşıyaka Arena; Attendance: 5,500; Referees: Kerem Baki, Mehmet Serdar Ünal, Uğur Akyıldız

9 November 2024 6	Galatasaray	91–88	Beşiktaş Fibabanka	Zeytinburnu, Istanbul
20:30 TRT (UTC+3)	Scoring by quarter: 25–27, 21–19, 18–25, 27–17
	Pts: Livingston II 31; Rebs: Izundu 13; Asts: Livingston II 6 PIR: Livingston II 30	Boxscore; Report	Pts: Needham 19; Rebs: Morgan 7 Asts: Allman 7 PIR: Morgan 16	Arena: Basketbol Gelişim Merkezi; Referees: Yener Yılmaz, Alper Özgök, Alper Gökçebel

16 November 2024 7	Galatasaray	101–82	Mersin MSK	Zeytinburnu, Istanbul
13:00 TRT (UTC+3)	Scoring by quarter: 26–22, 27–15, 23–22, 25–23
	Pts: Palmer 24; Rebs: Delgado 9 Asts: Tuncer 6 PIR: Palmer 28	Boxscore; Report	Pts: Cruz 24; Rebs: Piñeiro 11; Asts: Cruz 4 PIR: Piñeiro 26	Arena: Basketbol Gelişim Merkezi; Referees: Zafer Yılmaz, Mehmet Karabilecen, Özge Şentürk Bayraktar

30 November 2024 8	Onvo Büyükçekmece	65–76	Galatasaray	Büyükçekmece, Istanbul
15:30 TRT (UTC+3)	Scoring by quarter: 27–22, 10–19, 11–20, 17–15
	Pts: Love 21; Rebs: three players 5 Asts: Love 6 PIR: Love 20	Boxscore; Report	Pts: Cummings 13; Rebs: Delgado 12; Asts: Palmer 7 PIR: Geyik 15	Arena: Gazanfer Bilge Sports Hall; Referees: Yener Yılmaz, Fatih Arslanoğlu, Mesut Öztürk

9 December 2024 9	Galatasaray	79–69	Yalovaspor Basketbol	Zeytinburnu, Istanbul
19:00 TRT (UTC+3)	Scoring by quarter: 23–13, 17–18, 26–26, 13–12
	Pts: Livingston II 15; Rebs: Delgado 10; Asts: Palmer 6 PIR: Delgado 22	Boxscore; Report	Pts: Johnson 16; Rebs: Güven 9 Asts: Bayram 6 PIR: Bayram 15	Arena: Basketbol Gelişim Merkezi; Referees: Ali Serkan Emlek, Alper Özgök, Ahmet Tatlıcı

13 December 2024 10	Bursaspor Basketbol	82–105	Galatasaray	Nilüfer, Bursa
20:30 TRT (UTC+3)	Scoring by quarter: 24–23, 17–26, 21–21, 20–35
	Pts: Brown 16; Rebs: Brown, Sharma 4 Asts: Al 4 PIR: Brown, Michineau 14	Boxscore; Report	Pts: Palmer 30; Rebs: Izundu 10; Asts: Palmer 7 PIR: Palmer 34	Arena: Tofaş Nilüfer Sports Hall; Referees: Ali Şakacı, Duhan Köyiçi, Musa Kazım Çetin

21 December 2024 11	Galatasaray	100–82	Darüşşafaka Lassa	Zeytinburnu, Istanbul
20:30 TRT (UTC+3)	Scoring by quarter: 29–21, 26–34, 20–16, 25–11
	Pts: Cummings 27; Rebs: Delgado 12; Asts: Palmer 9 PIR: Cummings 34	Boxscore; Report	Pts: Moore 21; Rebs: Brajkovic, Moore 9 Asts: Moore 6 PIR: Moore 24	Arena: Basketbol Gelişim Merkezi; Referees: Mehmet Serdar Ünal, Ziya Özorhon, Özge Şentürk Bayraktar

29 December 2024 12	Petkim Spor	77–94	Galatasaray	Aliağa, İzmir
18:00 TRT (UTC+3)	Scoring by quarter: 26–29, 22–26, 8–21, 21–18
	Pts: van Beck 16; Rebs: Echenique 9 Asts: Russell 4 PIR: Echenique 20	Boxscore; Report	Pts: Izundu 15; Rebs: Izundu 6 Asts: Livingston, Palmer 6 PIR: Izundu 21	Arena: Enka Sport Hall; Referees: Emin Moğulkoç, Özlem Yalman, Burak Yılmaz

4 January 2025 13	Galatasaray	115–105(OT)	Manisa Basket	Zeytinburnu, Istanbul
15:30 TRT (UTC+3)	Scoring by quarter: 29–20, 20–30, 22–22, 28–27, Overtime: 16–6
	Pts: Delgado 19; Rebs: Delgado 10; Asts: Livingston 8 PIR: Delgado 25	Boxscore; Report	Pts: White 23; Rebs: Thomas 9 Asts: Lee 7 PIR: Lual-Acuil 18	Arena: Basketbol Gelişim Merkezi; Referees: Mehmet Şahin, Alper Özgök, Tolga Akkuşoğlu

12 January 2025 14	Anadolu Efes	99–87	Galatasaray	Zeytinburnu, Istanbul
20:30 TRT (UTC+3)	Scoring by quarter: 23–17, 29–29, 20–16, 27–25
	Pts: Larkin, Willis 18; Rebs: Osmani, Poirier 7 Asts: Thompson 8 PIR: Larkin 19	Boxscore; Report	Pts: Palmer 27; Rebs: Izundu 13; Asts: Livingston II 8 PIR: Palmer 26	Arena: Basketbol Gelişim Merkezi; Referees: Hüseyin Çelik, Seher Ayşe Nur Yazıcıoğlu, Uğur Akyıldız

19 January 2025 15	Galatasaray	81–95	Fenerbahçe Beko	Zeytinburnu, Istanbul
20:30 TRT (UTC+3)	Scoring by quarter: 25–24, 16–25, 17–21, 23–25
	Pts: Livingston II 20; Rebs: Delgado 9 Asts: Livingston II 5 PIR: Izundu 21	Boxscore; Report	Pts: Şanlı 22; Rebs: Colson, Hayes-Davis 6 Asts: Hall 8 PIR: Gudurić 20	Arena: Basketbol Gelişim Merkezi; Referees: Kerem Baki, Alper Altuğ Köselerli, Batuhan Söylemezoğlu

26 January 2025 16	Galatasaray	73–78	Türk Telekom	Zeytinburnu, Istanbul
18:00 TRT (UTC+3)	Scoring by quarter: 17–13, 16–29, 16–19, 24–17
	Pts: Livingston II 23; Rebs: Delgado 11; Asts: Tuncer 5 PIR: Livingston II 18	Boxscore; Report	Pts: Akpınar 16; Rebs: Angola, Brown 9 Asts: Brown 6 PIR: Alexander, Brown 20	Arena: Basketbol Gelişim Merkezi; Referees: Zafer Yılmaz, Tolga Edis, Murat Ciner

1 February 2025 17	Tofaş	88–83	Galatasaray	Nilüfer, Bursa
20:30 TRT (UTC+3)	Scoring by quarter: 31–25, 22–16, 14–17, 21–25
	Pts: Reed 29; Rebs: Reed 6 Asts: Pérez 6 PIR: Reed 31	Boxscore; Report	Pts: Wallace 16; Rebs: Izundu 8 Asts: Wallace 5 PIR: Wallace 20	Arena: Tofaş Nilüfer Sports Hall; Referees: Can Mavisu, Mehmet Serdar Ünal, Polat Parlak

8 February 2025 18	Galatasaray	87–84	Bahçeşehir Koleji	Zeytinburnu, Istanbul
18:00 TRT (UTC+3)	Scoring by quarter: 26–20, 14–35, 17–12, 30–17
	Pts: Palmer 32; Rebs: Delgado 11; Asts: Livingston II, Tuncer 5 PIR: Palmer 33	Boxscore; Report	Pts: Korkmaz, Odiase 18; Rebs: Bouteille, Simonović 7 Asts: Sipahi 7 PIR: Korkmaz 21	Arena: Basketbol Gelişim Merkezi; Referees: Ali Serkan Emlek, Ahmet Tatlıcı, Berk Kurtulmuş

2 March 2025 19	Yukatel Merkezefendi	98–96	Galatasaray	Denizli
15:30 TRT (UTC+3)	Scoring by quarter: 24–30, 28–23, 25–19, 21–24
	Pts: Bleijenbergh, Moody 20; Rebs: Bleijenbergh 9 Asts: Moody 6 PIR: Bleijenbergh 30	Boxscore	Pts: Palmer 28; Rebs: Delgado 11; Asts: Wallace 5 PIR: Palmer 26	Arena: Pamukkale University Arena; Referees: Kerem Baki, Ziya Özorhon, Alper Gökçebel

8 March 2025 20	Galatasaray	101–80	Karşıyaka	Zeytinburnu, Istanbul
18:00 TRT (UTC+3)	Scoring by quarter: 20–15, 29–26, 21–17, 31–22
	Pts: Cummings 15; Rebs: Delgado 8 Asts: Tuncer 8 PIR: Delgado, Tuncer 18	Boxscore; Report	Pts: Gallinat 19; Rebs: four players 4 Asts: Yılmaz 6 PIR: Gallinat 18	Arena: Basketbol Gelişim Merkezi; Referees: Yener Yılmaz, Orhan Çağrı Hekimoğlu, Özge Şentürk Bayraktar

15 March 2025 21	Beşiktaş Fibabanka	92–77	Galatasaray	Istanbul
18:00 TRT (UTC+3)	Scoring by quarter: 28–20, 19–22, 21–21, 24–14
	Pts: Sleva 21; Rebs: four players 6 Asts: Allman 7 PIR: Sleva 25	Boxscore; Report	Pts: Wallace 20; Rebs: Delgado 8 Asts: Tuncer 8 PIR: Wallace 20	Arena: BJK Akatlar Arena; Referees: Zafer Yılmaz, Fatih Arslanoğlu, Nazlı Çisil Güngör

22 March 2025 22	Mersin MSK	89–73	Galatasaray	Mersin
13:00 TRT (UTC+3)	Scoring by quarter: 30–23, 20–21, 21–15, 18–14
	Pts: Cruz 19; Rebs: Olaseni 15; Asts: Cobbs, Efianayi 4 PIR: Olaseni 25	Boxscore; Report	Pts: Izundu 23; Rebs: Izundu 9 Asts: Palmer 6 PIR: Izundu 26	Arena: Servet Tazegül Spor Salonu; Referees: Kaan Büyükçil, Ali Şakacı, Tolga Akkuşoğlu

30 March 2025 23	Galatasaray	110–112	Onvo Büyükçekmece	Zeytinburnu, Istanbul
15:30 TRT (UTC+3)	Scoring by quarter: 30–27, 38–34, 17–30, 25–21
	Pts: Tuncer 21; Rebs: Palmer 5 Asts: Tuncer 7 PIR: Tuncer 25	Boxscore; Report	Pts: Franke 26; Rebs: Bruinsma, Sajus 7 Asts: Starks 7 PIR: Franke 28	Arena: Basketbol Gelişim Merkezi; Referees: Hüseyin Çelik, Seher Ayşe Nur Yazıcıoğlu, Uğur Akyıldız

5 April 2025 24	Yalovaspor Basketbol	81–88	Galatasaray	Yalova
15:30 TRT (UTC+3)	Scoring by quarter: 17–13, 21–16, 21–29, 22–30
	Pts: Sherfield 26; Rebs: McConico 8 Asts: Nichols 6 PIR: Nichols 20	Boxscore; Report	Pts: Cummings 25; Rebs: Young 8 Asts: Cummings 7 PIR: Cummings 26	Arena: Yalova 90. Yıl Spor Salonu; Referees: Kerem Baki, Alper Altuğ Köselerli, Batuhan Söylemezoğlu

12 April 2025 25	Galatasaray	95–89	Bursaspor Basketbol	Zeytinburnu, Istanbul
20:30 TRT (UTC+3)	Scoring by quarter: 15–25, 29–16, 25–16, 26–32
	Pts: Izundu 23; Rebs: Izundu 8 Asts: Cummings 6 PIR: Izundu 31	Boxscore; Report	Pts: Brown 14; Rebs: Grantham 7 Asts: DeJulius 10; PIR: DeJulius 22	Arena: Basketbol Gelişim Merkezi; Referees: Can Mavisu, Mehmet Serdar Ünal, Musa Kazım Çetin

19 April 2025 26	Darüşşafaka Lassa	94–87	Galatasaray	Istanbul
20:30 TRT (UTC+3)	Scoring by quarter: 19–17, 20–21, 19–23, 36–26
	Pts: Moore 24; Rebs: Moore, Demir 8 Asts: Appleby 5 PIR: Moore 27	Boxscore; Report	Pts: Cummings 23; Rebs: Young 7 Asts: Tuncer 8 PIR: Palmer 21	Arena: Ayhan Şahenk Sports Hall; Referees: Yener Yılmaz, Tolga Edis, Alper Gökçebel

27 April 2025 27	Galatasaray	81–86	Petkim Spor	Zeytinburnu, Istanbul
20:30 TRT (UTC+3)	Scoring by quarter: 22–26, 22–22, 18–14, 19–24
	Pts: Cummings 22; Rebs: Izundu 8 Asts: Palmer 5 PIR: Cummings 24	Boxscore; Report	Pts: van Beck 22; Rebs: Aldridge 8 Asts: Russell 8 PIR: van Beck 24	Arena: Basketbol Gelişim Merkezi; Referees: Mehmet Şahin, Ziya Özorhon, Murat Ciner

2 May 2025 28	Manisa Basket	94–75	Galatasaray	Manisa
18:00 TRT (UTC+3)	Scoring by quarter: 25–23, 26–16, 29–16, 14–20
	Pts: White 18; Rebs: Lual-Acuil 9 Asts: Chiozza 7 PIR: Chiozza, Thomas 19	Boxscore	Pts: Izundu 13; Rebs: Delgado 9 Asts: Tuncer 5 PIR: Izundu 14	Arena: Özel Mostem Spor Salonu; Referees: Alper Altuğ Köselerli, Ali Şakacı, Tolga Akkuşoğlu

20 May 2025 29	Galatasaray	53–87	Anadolu Efes	Zeytinburnu, Istanbul
19:00 TRT (UTC+3)	Scoring by quarter: 19–21, 13–24, 10–24, 11–18
	Pts: Palmer 12; Rebs: Izundu, Palmer 5 Asts: Cummings 4 PIR: Izundu 10	Boxscore; Report	Pts: Özdemiroğlu 21; Rebs: Willis 11; Asts: Thompson 5 PIR: Özdemiroğlu 26	Arena: Basketbol Gelişim Merkezi; Referees: Özlem Yalman, Fatih Arslanoğlu, Ahmet Tatlıcı

17 May 2025 30	Fenerbahçe Beko	94–70	Galatasaray	Istanbul
18:00 TRT (UTC+3)	Scoring by quarter: 23–16, 30–16, 22–20, 19–18
	Pts: Biberović 16; Rebs: Biberović 6 Asts: Gudurić 4 PIR: Biberović 20	Boxscore; Report	Pts: Tuncer 15; Rebs: Wallace 9 Asts: Tuncer 4 PIR: Tuncer 15	Arena: Ülker Sports Arena; Referees: Ali Serkan Emlek, Zafer Yılmaz, Nazlı Çisil Güngör

==== Play-in ====
24 May 2025 PI	Galatasaray	94–90	Onvo Büyükçekmece	Zeytinburnu, Istanbul
15:30 TRT (UTC+3)	Scoring by quarter: 15–23, 26–18, 22–25, 31–24
	Pts: Palmer 23; Rebs: Delgado 12; Asts: Tuncer 5 PIR: Palmer 26	Boxscore	Pts: Starks 23; Rebs: Bruinsma 7 Asts: Starks 12; PIR: Starks 34	Arena: Basketbol Gelişim Merkezi; Referees: Orhan Çağrı Hekimoğlu, Polat Parlak, Tolga Edis

==== Playoffs ====
===== Quarterfinals =====
30 May 2025 1	Beşiktaş Fibabanka	91–75 (Series: 1–0)	Galatasaray	Istanbul
20:30 TRT (UTC+3)	Scoring by quarter: 26–21, 20–19, 25–11, 20–24
	Pts: Mathews, Uğurlu 19; Rebs: Terry 11; Asts: Needham 4 PIR: Uğurlu 27	Boxscore; Report	Pts: Izundu 18; Rebs: Izundu 10; Asts: Tuncer 4 PIR: Izundu 27	Arena: BJK Akatlar Arena; Referees: Emin Moğulkoç, Can Mavisu, Ali Şakacı

1 June 2025 2	Galatasaray	85–107 (Series: 0–2)	Beşiktaş Fibabanka	Zeytinburnu, Istanbul
20:30 TRT (UTC+3)	Scoring by quarter: 29–23, 27–36, 17–33, 12–15
	Pts: Palmer 19; Rebs: Izundu 6 Asts: Palmer 8 PIR: Young 23	Boxscore; Report	Pts: Mathews 20; Rebs: Arslan 9 Asts: Allman, Needham 5 PIR: Sleva 24	Arena: Basketbol Gelişim Merkezi; Referees: Mehmet Şahin, Hüseyin Çelik, Seher Ayşe Nur Yazıcıoğlu

=== Basketball Champions League ===
==== Regular season ====
===== Group D =====
Pos	Team	Pld	W	L	PF	PA	PD	Pts	Qualification	NYM	GAL	PRO	VEC
1	(Czech Republic) ERA Nymburk	6	5	1	516	452	+64	11	Advance to round of 16	—	80–70	75–85	93–74
2	(Turkey) Galatasaray	6	4	2	492	471	+21	10	Advance to play-ins	75–87	—	91–74	103–91
3	(Greece) Promitheas	6	2	4	478	503	−25	8	Advance to play-ins	78–86	75–79	—	78–86
4	(Germany) Rasta Vechta	6	1	5	471	531	−60	7		70–95	64–74	86–88	—

Source: Group Standings
Legend: Blue = home team win; Red = away team win.

==== Regular Season Matches ====
Win Loss

1 October 2024 RS1	Galatasaray (Turkey)	103–91	(Germany) Rasta Vechta	Zeytinburnu, Istanbul, Turkey
20:00 TRT (UTC+3)	Scoring by quarter: 30–13, 26–20, 22–29, 25–29
	Pts: Livingston 21; Rebs: Kabaca 8 Asts: Livingston 9 PIR: Livingston 23	Boxscore; Report	Pts: Gardner 18; Rebs: Randolph 6 Asts: Robinson 5 PIR: Robinson 22	Arena: Basketbol Gelişim Merkezi; Attendance: 1,989; Referees: Paulo Marques (POR), Michał Proc (POL), Dariusz Zapolski (POL)

8 October 2024 RS2	Galatasaray (Turkey)	75–87	(Czech Republic) ERA Nymburk	Zeytinburnu, Istanbul, Turkey
20:00 TRT (UTC+3)	Scoring by quarter: 13–23, 24–23, 20–20, 18–21
	Pts: Palmer 19; Rebs: Izundu, Delgado 8 Asts: Livingston 7 PIR: Livingston, Izundu 17	Boxscore; Report	Pts: Bishop 15; Rebs: Bishop 9 Asts: Sehnal 6 PIR: Bishop 20	Arena: Basketbol Gelişim Merkezi; Attendance: 1,459; Referees: Boris Krejic (SLO), Georgios Poursanidis (GRE), Petar Pesic (SRB)

23 October 2024 RS3	Promitheas (Greece)	75–79	(Turkey) Galatasaray	Patras, Greece
19:30 TRT (UTC+3)	Scoring by quarter: 17–19, 21–21, 10–21, 27–18
	Pts: Walker 25; Rebs: Lountzis 5 Asts: Lountzis, Iwundu 5 PIR: Iwundu 24	Boxscore; Report	Pts: Cummings 21; Rebs: Delgado 31; Asts: Livingston 5 PIR: Delgado 24	Arena: Dimitris Tofalos Arena; Attendance: 1,359; Referees: Antonio Conde (ESP), Peter Praksch (HUN), Michal Proc (POL)

5 November 2024 RS4	Galatasaray (Turkey)	91–74	(Greece) Promitheas	Zeytinburnu, Istanbul, Turkey
20:00 TRT (UTC+3)	Scoring by quarter: 23–20, 24–21, 16–13, 28–20
	Pts: Livingston II, Palmer 14; Rebs: Izundu 9 Asts: Tuncer 8 PIR: Izundu 19	Boxscore; Report	Pts: Walker 22; Rebs: Iwundu, Karagiannidis 6 Asts: Perry, Walker 4 PIR: Walker 18	Arena: Basketbol Gelişim Merkezi; Attendance: 1,952; Referees: Boris Krejic (SLO), Paulo Marques (POR), Gvidas Gedvilas (LTU)

3 December 2024 RS5	ERA Nymburk (Czech Republic)	80–70	(Turkey) Galatasaray	Prague, Czech Republic
20:30 TRT (UTC+3)	Scoring by quarter: 24–15, 12–28, 23–15, 21–12
	Pts: Shumate 16; Rebs: Kříž 6 Asts: Brown 5 PIR: Shumate 17	Boxscore; Report	Pts: Palmer 15; Rebs: Delgado 9 Asts: Tuncer 5 PIR: Palmer 20	Arena: Královka Arena; Referees: Wojciech Liszka (POL), Luis Castillo (ESP), Martin Horozov (BUL)

17 December 2024 RS6	Rasta Vechta (Germany)	64–74	(Turkey) Galatasaray	Vechta, Germany
22:30 TRT (UTC+3)	Scoring by quarter: 9–20, 18–16, 17–15, 20–23
	Pts: Campbell 19; Rebs: Gardner, Cozart 7 Asts: Campbell 5 PIR: Campbell 24	Boxscore; Report	Pts: Tuncer 23; Rebs: Palmer 8 Asts: Palmer 4 PIR: Tuncer 20	Arena: Rasta Dome; Attendance: 3,140; Referees: Gvidas Gedvilas (LTU), Mihkel Manniste (EST), Alexandre Deman (FRA)

==== Play-ins ====
Win Loss

7 January 2025 1	Galatasaray (Turkey)	84–63 (Series: 1–0)	(France) Saint-Quentin	Zeytinburnu, Istanbul, Turkey
20:00 TRT (UTC+3)	Scoring by quarter: 22–9, 21–24, 29–14, 12–16
	Pts: Izundu 17; Rebs: Palmer, Delgado 6 Asts: Livingston 6 PIR: Cummings 22	Boxscore; Report	Pts: Oniangue 15; Rebs: Santos-Silva 9 Asts: Goudou-Sinha, Oniangue 3 PIR: Oniangue 18	Arena: Basketbol Gelişim Merkezi; Attendance: 2,017; Referees: Wojciech Liszka (POL), Martin Horozov (BUL), Ventsislav Velikov (BUL)

15 January 2025 2	Saint-Quentin (France)	90–79 (Series: 1–1)	(Turkey) Galatasaray	Saint-Quentin, France
22:00 TRT (UTC+3)	Scoring by quarter: 21–19, 24–22, 26–17, 19–21
	Pts: Traoré 18; Rebs: Robinson 8 Asts: Traoré 6 PIR: Oniangue, Traoré 17	Boxscore; Report	Pts: Palmer 29; Rebs: Delgado 8 Asts: Cummings 6 PIR: Cummings 26	Arena: Palais des Sports Pierre Ratte; Attendance: 2,570; Referees: Julio Anaya (PAN), Georgios Poursanidis (GRE), Mihkel Manniste (EST)

21 January 2025 3	Galatasaray (Turkey)	75–73 (Series: 2–1)	(France) Saint-Quentin	Zeytinburnu, Istanbul, Turkey
20:00 TRT (UTC+3)	Scoring by quarter: 23–15, 22–16, 9–25, 21–17
	Pts: Cummings 24; Rebs: Izundu 11; Asts: Tuncer 5 PIR: Cummings 26	Boxscore; Report	Pts: Traoré 20; Rebs: Traoré 6 Asts: Traoré 4 PIR: Traoré 23	Arena: Basketbol Gelişim Merkezi; Attendance: 850; Referees: Ademir Zurapovic (BIH), Martins Kozlovskis (LAT), Martin Vulic (CRO)

==== Round of 16 ====
===== Group J =====
Pos	Team	Pld	W	L	PF	PA	PD	Pts	Qualification	UNI	GAL	RYT	MAN
1	(Spain) Unicaja	6	5	1	550	503	+47	11	Advance to quarter-finals	—	97–91	92–74	91–73
2	(Turkey) Galatasaray	6	4	2	532	514	+18	10	Advance to quarter-finals	86–84	—	89–81	104–81
3	(Lithuania) Rytas	6	2	4	496	502	−6	8		82–83	86–66	—	98–74
4	(Turkey) Manisa Basket	6	1	5	508	567	−59	7		97–103	85–96	98–75	—

Source: Round of 16 Standings
Legend: Blue = home team win; Red = away team win.

==== Round of 16 Matches ====
Win Loss

29 January 2025 R16–1	Rytas (Lithuania)	86–66	(Turkey) Galatasaray	Vilnius, Lithuania
20:30 TRT (UTC+3)	Scoring by quarter: 15–20, 19–17, 26–19, 26–10
	Pts: Radzevičius 16; Rebs: Enoch 10; Asts: Cole 17; PIR: Masiulis, Enoch 20	Boxscore; Report	Pts: Livingston II 14; Rebs: Izundu 6 Asts: Livingston II, Palmer 4 PIR: Livingston II 14	Arena: Twinsbet Arena; Attendance: 5,919; Referees: Paulo Marques (POR), Andris Aunkrogers (LAT), Peter Praksch (HUN)

5 February 2025 R16–2	Manisa Basket (Turkey)	85–96	(Turkey) Galatasaray	Manisa, Turkey
20:00 TRT (UTC+3)	Scoring by quarter: 15–28, 25–17, 15–23, 30–28
	Pts: White, Sonsırma 19; Rebs: Lual-Acuil 10; Asts: Lee 8 PIR: Sonsırma 24	Boxscore; Report	Pts: Palmer 20; Rebs: Palmer, Izundu 10; Asts: Palmer 7 PIR: Izundu 28	Arena: Muradiye Spor Salonu; Referees: Antonio Conde (ESP), Luis Castillo (ESP), Lorenzo Baldini (ITA)

5 March 2025 R16–3	Galatasaray (Turkey)	86–84	(Spain) Unicaja	Zeytinburnu, Istanbul, Turkey
20:00 TRT (UTC+3)	Scoring by quarter: 24–21, 14–17, 24–19, 24–27
	Pts: Wallace 17; Rebs: Delgado 9 Asts: Palmer 6 PIR: Young 20	Boxscore; Report	Pts: Pérez 17; Rebs: Carter, Taylor 6 Asts: Perry 6 PIR: Pérez, Taylor 20	Arena: Basketbol Gelişim Merkezi; Attendance: 1,206; Referees: Yohan Rosso (FRA), Mārtiņš Kozlovskis (LAT), Andris Aunkrogers (LAT)

11 March 2025 R16–4	Unicaja (Spain)	97–91	(Turkey) Galatasaray	Málaga, Spain
22:30 TRT (UTC+3)	Scoring by quarter: 20–27, 25–27, 21–18, 31–19
	Pts: Carter, Perry 16; Rebs: Sima 9 Asts: Perry 9 PIR: Ejim 22	Boxscore; Report	Pts: Cummings 22; Rebs: Young, Cummings 5 Asts: Cummings, Tuncer 5 PIR: Cummings 27	Arena: Martín Carpena; Referees: Wojciech Liszka (POL), Gatis Salins (LAT), Peter Praksch (HUN)

18 March 2025 R16–5	Galatasaray (Turkey)	89–81	(Lithuania) Rytas	Zeytinburnu, Istanbul, Turkey
20:00 TRT (UTC+3)	Scoring by quarter: 24–23, 14–13, 21–23, 30–22
	Pts: Cummings 22; Rebs: Izundu 8 Asts: Palmer 7 PIR: Cummings 20	Boxscore; Report	Pts: Cole 25; Rebs: Radzevičius 7 Asts: Flagg 4 PIR: Cole 22	Arena: Basketbol Gelişim Merkezi; Attendance: 1,681; Referees: Julio Anaya (PAN), Lorenzo Baldini (ITA), Martin Vulic (CRO)

25 March 2025 R16–6	Galatasaray (Turkey)	104–81	(Turkey) Manisa Basket	Zeytinburnu, Istanbul, Turkey
20:30 TRT (UTC+3)	Scoring by quarter: 33–21, 17–25, 28–14, 26–21
	Pts: Kabaca, Palmer 16; Rebs: Izundu 12; Asts: Wallace 5 PIR: Izundu 21	Boxscore; Report	Pts: White 25; Rebs: Lual-Acuil 9 Asts: Sonsırma 7 PIR: White 25	Arena: Basketbol Gelişim Merkezi; Referees: Yohan Rosso (FRA), Nicolas Maestre (FRA), Geert Jacobs (BEL)

==== Quarterfinals ====
Win Loss

9 April 2025 1	ERA Nymburk (Czech Republic)	80–106 (Series: 0–1)	(Turkey) Galatasaray	Prague, Czech Republic
19:30 TRT (UTC+3)	Scoring by quarter: 23–27, 24–22, 15–30, 18–27
	Pts: Ceaser 14; Rebs: Bishop 12; Asts: Sehnal 7 PIR: Ceaser 15	Boxscore; Report	Pts: Cummings 33; Rebs: Young 10; Asts: Palmer 6 PIR: Cummings 29	Arena: Královka Arena; Attendance: 2,500; Referees: Ademir Zurapović (BIH), Wojciech Liszka (POL), Luis Miguel Castillo (ESP)

15 April 2025 2	Galatasaray (Turkey)	90–74 (Series: 2–0)	(Czech Republic) ERA Nymburk	Zeytinburnu, Istanbul, Turkey
19:00 TRT (UTC+3)	Scoring by quarter: 25–22, 21–18, 22–21, 22–13
	Pts: Palmer 24; Rebs: Young 8 Asts: Cummings, Palmer 5 PIR: Palmer 27	Boxscore; Report	Pts: Bohačík 15; Rebs: Bishop 12; Asts: Sehnal 5 PIR: Bishop 18	Arena: Basketbol Gelişim Merkezi; Attendance: 3,176; Referees: Antonio Conde (ESP), Yohan Rosso (FRA), Boris Krejic (SLO)

==== Semifinals ====
Win Loss

9 May 2025 SF	La Laguna Tenerife (Spain)	80–90	Galatasaray (Turkey)	Athens, Greece
18:00 TRT (UTC+3)	Scoring by quarter: 24–20, 19–20, 12–24, 25–26
	Pts: Huertas 18; Rebs: Scrubb 5 Asts: Fitipaldo 6 PIR: Shermadini 17	Boxscore; Report	Pts: Cummings, Izundu 21; Rebs: Izundu 10; Asts: three players 3 PIR: Izundu 28	Arena: SUNEL Arena; Attendance: 7,211; Referees: Ademir Zurapovic (BIH), Yohan Rosso (FRA), Gvidas Gedvilas (LTU)

==== Final ====
Win Loss

11 May 2025 F	Galatasaray (Turkey)	67–83	Unicaja (Spain)	Athens, Greece
20:00 TRT (UTC+3)	Scoring by quarter: 13–19, 18–18, 18–19, 18–27
	Pts: Cummings, Wallace 14; Rebs: Izundu 11; Asts: Palmer 4 PIR: Wallace 16	Boxscore; Report	Pts: Carter 14; Rebs: Pérez 11; Asts: Carter 5 PIR: Pérez 18	Arena: SUNEL Arena; Attendance: 7,212; Referees: Wojciech Liszka (POL), Boris Krejic (SLO), Julio Anaya (PAN)

=== Turkish Basketball Cup ===
==== Quarterfinals ====
Win Loss

11 February 2025 QF	Karşıyaka	88–97	Galatasaray	Karşıyaka, İzmir
18:00 TRT (UTC+3)	Scoring by quarter: 16–22, 33–22, 15–27, 24–26
TRT Spor Yıldız	Pts: Gallinat 24; Rebs: Yaşar 9 Asts: Yılmaz 8 PIR: Yaşar 29	Boxscore; Report	Pts: Livingston II 25; Rebs: Delgado 12; Asts: Palmer, Tuncer 5 PIR: Delgado 29	Arena: Karşıyaka Arena; Referees: Alper Altuğ Köselerli, Ziya Özorhon, Alper Gökçebel

==== Semifinals ====
Win Loss

14 February 2025 SF	Fenerbahçe Beko	89–74	Galatasaray	Şanlıurfa
20:30 TRT (UTC+3)	Scoring by quarter: 22–16, 20–19, 22–11, 25–28
TRT Spor Yıldız	Pts: Hayes-Davis 18; Rebs: Hall 5 Asts: Baldwin IV 5 PIR: Hayes-Davis 20	Boxscore; Report	Pts: Cummings 22; Rebs: Delgado 9 Asts: Tuncer 5 PIR: Cummings, Tuncer 18	Arena: 11 Nisan Spor Salonu; Referees: Mehmet Şahin, Hüseyin Çelik, Uğur Akyıldız

== See also ==
- Commons:Category:2024–25 Galatasaray Basketball season
