= 2022 FIBA AmeriCup =

19th edition of the FIBA AmeriCup

Tournament details
- Host country: Brazil
- City: Recife
- Dates: 2–11 September
- Teams: 12
- Venue: 1 (in 1 host city)

Final positions
- Champions: Argentina (3rd title)
- Runners-up: Brazil
- Third place: United States
- Fourth place: Canada

Tournament statistics
- Games played: 26
- MVP: (Argentina) Gabriel Deck
- Top scorer: (Argentina) Gabriel Deck (21.2 points per game)

The 2022 FIBA AmeriCup was the 19th edition of the FIBA AmeriCup, the quadrennial international men's basketball championship organized by FIBA Americas. The tournament was held in Recife, Brazil, as Brasília was dropped as a second host city months before the tournament. It was originally scheduled to take place in 2021, but it was postponed due to the COVID-19 pandemic to 2 to 11 September 2022.

The 2022 FIBA AmeriCup concluded with Argentina winning the final against Brazil to win their third title. The United States secured the bronze medal with a victory over Canada.

== Qualified teams ==
Twelve teams qualified for the final tournament.

Team	Qualification method	Date of qualification	App	Last	Best placement in tournament
Brazil	Group B top three	28 November 2020	19th	2017	Champions (1984, 1988, 2005, 2009)
Panama	Group B top three	28 November 2020	13th	2017	Fourth place (1984)
United States	Group D top three	30 November 2020	11th	2017	Champions (1992, 1993, 1997, 1999, 2003, 2007, 2017)
Dominican Republic	Group C top three	19 February 2021	14th	2017	Third place (2011)
Mexico	Group D top three	19 February 2021	15th	2017	Champions (2013)
Canada	Group C top three	20 February 2021	19th	2017	Runners-up (1980, 1999)
Puerto Rico	Group D top three	20 February 2021	19th	2017	Champions (1980, 1989, 1995)
Uruguay	Group B top three	21 February 2021	18th	2017	Runners-up (1984)
Venezuela	Group A top three	21 February 2021	17th	2017	Champions (2015)
Argentina	Group A top three	21 February 2021	19th	2017	Champions (2001, 2011)
Colombia	Group A top three	22 February 2021	2nd	2017	Eleventh place (2017)
Virgin Islands	Group C top three	4 March 2021	6th	2017	Fourth place (2017)

== Draw ==
The draw took place on 29 March 2022 in Miami, United States.

Pot 1
Team	Pos
United States	1
Argentina	7
Brazil	14

Pot 2
Team	Pos
Venezuela	17
Canada	18
Puerto Rico	19

Pot 3
Team	Pos
Dominican Republic	20
Mexico	24
Uruguay	40

Pot 4
Team	Pos
Panama	49
Virgin Islands	57
Colombia	66

== Preliminary round ==
All times are local (UTC−3).

=== Group A ===
Pos	Team	Pld	W	L	PF	PA	PD	Pts	Qualification
1	Brazil (H)	3	3	0	248	189	+59	6	Advance to Quarterfinals
2	Canada	3	2	1	209	211	−2	5	Advance to Quarterfinals
3	Colombia	3	1	2	191	226	−35	4	
4	Uruguay	3	0	3	208	230	−22	3	

Source: FIBA
Rules for classification: 1) Points; 2) Head-to-head results; 3) Points difference; 4) Points scored.
(H) Hosts

2 September 2022
13:40

Boxscore

Uruguay	64–70	Colombia
Scoring by quarter: 25–18, 15–15, 16–17, 8–20
Pts: Ubal 27; Rebs: Batista 7 Asts: Rodríguez 4		Pts: Echenique, Palacios 17; Rebs: Echenique 11; Asts: Roque 4

Ginásio de Esportes Geraldo Magalhães, Recife
Referees: Jorge Vázquez (PUR), Omar Bermúdez (MEX), Jenna Reneau (USA)

2 September 2022
20:10

Boxscore

Brazil	72–63	Canada
Scoring by quarter: 17–15, 15–9, 18–22, 22–17
Pts: Santos 13; Rebs: Meindl 9 Asts: De Paula 4		Pts: Banton 20; Rebs: Banton 11; Asts: Kennedy 2

Ginásio de Esportes Geraldo Magalhães, Recife
Referees: Roberto Vázquez (PUR), Julio Anaya (PAN), Daniel García (VEN)

3 September 2022
17:40

Boxscore

Canada	84–78	Uruguay
Scoring by quarter: 17–19, 25–18, 12–24, 30–17
Pts: Blair 23; Rebs: Banton 5 Asts: Banton 6		Pts: Rodríguez 21; Rebs: Iglesias 5 Asts: Parodi, Rodríguez 6

Ginásio de Esportes Geraldo Magalhães, Recife
Referees: Roberto Vázquez (PUR), Juan Fernández (ARG), Blanca Burns (USA)

3 September 2022
20:10

Boxscore

Colombia	60–100	Brazil
Scoring by quarter: 22–25, 12–23, 6–27, 20–25
Pts: Trocha-Morelos 16; Rebs: Echenique 5 Asts: Atencia 7		Pts: Dias, Santos 14; Rebs: Lima 9 Asts: Santos 6

Ginásio de Esportes Geraldo Magalhães, Recife
Referees: Jorge Vázquez (PUR), Jenna Reneau (USA), Hortencia Sánchez (MEX)

5 September 2022
11:10

Boxscore

Colombia	61–62	Canada
Scoring by quarter: 16–21, 22–9, 16–12, 7–20
Pts: Echenique 18; Rebs: Tello 10; Asts: Atencia, Rojas 4		Pts: Banton 20; Rebs: Pandi 7 Asts: Banton 5

Ginásio de Esportes Geraldo Magalhães, Recife
Referees: Omar Bermúdez (MEX), Jenna Reneau (USA), Hortencia Sánchez (MEX)

5 September 2022
20:10

Boxscore

Brazil	76–66	Uruguay
Scoring by quarter: 16–26, 19–17, 22–13, 19–10
Pts: Felício 14; Rebs: Felício 9 Asts: Huertas 7		Pts: Parodi 17; Rebs: Batista, Serres 4 Asts: Parodi, Rodríguez 4

Ginásio de Esportes Geraldo Magalhães, Recife
Referees: Jorge Vázquez (PUR), Julio Anaya (PAN), Carlos Peralta (ECU)

=== Group B ===
Pos	Team	Pld	W	L	PF	PA	PD	Pts	Qualification
1	Argentina	3	3	0	284	226	+58	6	Advance to Quarterfinals
2	Puerto Rico	3	2	1	250	254	−4	5	Advance to Quarterfinals
3	Dominican Republic	3	1	2	237	236	+1	4	Advance to Quarterfinals
4	Virgin Islands	3	0	3	193	248	−55	3	

Source: FIBA
Rules for classification: 1) Points; 2) Head-to-head results; 3) Points difference; 4) Points scored.

3 September 2022
11:10

Boxscore

Puerto Rico	88–82	Dominican Republic
Scoring by quarter: 23–12, 23–23, 23–21, 19–26
Pts: Conditt, Waters 20; Rebs: Romero 10; Asts: Waters 7		Pts: Feliz 22; Rebs: Delgado 6 Asts: Bautista 4

Ginásio de Esportes Geraldo Magalhães, Recife
Referees: Guilherme Locatelli (BRA), Krishna Domínguez (MEX), Diego Chiconato (BRA)

3 September 2022
13:40

Boxscore

Virgin Islands	62–95	Argentina
Scoring by quarter: 24–29, 8–23, 13–21, 17–22
Pts: Aska 13; Rebs: Aska, Hansen 6 Asts: Milligan 4		Pts: Laprovíttola 18; Rebs: Brussino 10; Asts: Campazzo 9

Ginásio de Esportes Geraldo Magalhães, Recife
Referees: Andrés Bartel (URU), Carlos Peralta (ECU), Andreia Silva (BRA)

4 September 2022
17:40

Boxscore

Dominican Republic	77–58	Virgin Islands
Scoring by quarter: 22–14, 16–9, 18–20, 21–15
Pts: Feliz 18; Rebs: Delgado 10; Asts: Suero 5		Pts: Aska, Hansen 10; Rebs: Jules 5 Asts: Bloodman 3

Ginásio de Esportes Geraldo Magalhães, Recife
Referees: Omar Bermúdez (MEX), Krishna Domínguez (MEX), Andreia Silva (BRA)

4 September 2022
20:10

Boxscore

Argentina	99–86	Puerto Rico
Scoring by quarter: 19–21, 28–23, 28–20, 24–22
Pts: Deck 27; Rebs: Deck 9 Asts: Campazzo 15		Pts: Ortiz 21; Rebs: Conditt 7 Asts: Waters 9

Ginásio de Esportes Geraldo Magalhães, Recife
Referees: Julio Anaya (PAN), Carlos Peralta (ECU), Daniel García (VEN)

6 September 2022
17:40

Boxscore

Virgin Islands	73–76	Puerto Rico
Scoring by quarter: 7–21, 26–24, 19–15, 21–16
Pts: Nesbitt 26; Rebs: Aska 8 Asts: Nesbitt 5		Pts: Romero 23; Rebs: Romero 11; Asts: Waters 7

Ginásio de Esportes Geraldo Magalhães, Recife
Referees: Omar Bermúdez (MEX), Daniel García (VEN), Andreia Silva (BRA)

6 September 2022
20:10

Boxscore

Dominican Republic	78–90	Argentina
Scoring by quarter: 24–25, 16–23, 20–18, 18–24
Pts: Delgado 20; Rebs: Delgado 10; Asts: three players 4		Pts: Deck 24; Rebs: Deck 6 Asts: Campazzo 8

Ginásio de Esportes Geraldo Magalhães, Recife
Referees: Julio Anaya (PAN), Krishna Domínguez (MEX), Carlos Vélez (COL)

=== Group C ===
Pos	Team	Pld	W	L	PF	PA	PD	Pts	Qualification
1	United States	3	2	1	256	180	+76	5	Advance to Quarterfinals
2	Mexico	3	2	1	212	207	+5	5	Advance to Quarterfinals
3	Venezuela	3	2	1	201	233	−32	5	Advance to Quarterfinals
4	Panama	3	0	3	176	225	−49	3	

Source: FIBA
Rules for classification: 1) Points; 2) Head-to-head results; 3) Points difference; 4) Points scored.

2 September 2022
17:40

Boxscore

Mexico	73–67	United States
Scoring by quarter: 15–14, 21–21, 20–13, 17–19
Pts: Stoll 15; Rebs: Jaimes 10; Asts: Stoll 9		Pts: Pargo 14; Rebs: Clark 12; Asts: Pargo 6

Ginásio de Esportes Geraldo Magalhães, Recife
Referees: Guilherme Locatelli (BRA), Kristian Paez (ECU), Felipe Ibarra (CHI)

2 September 2022
22:40

Boxscore

Venezuela	72–58	Panama
Scoring by quarter: 19–16, 17–13, 20–23, 16–6
Pts: Ascanio 17; Rebs: Graterol 13; Asts: Cazorla 7		Pts: Gaskins 20; Rebs: King, Romero 5 Asts: Gaskins 3

Ginásio de Esportes Geraldo Magalhães, Recife
Referees: Juan Fernández (ARG), Andrés Bartel (URU), Diego Chiconato (BRA)

4 September 2022
11:10

Boxscore

Panama	60–65	Mexico
Scoring by quarter: 16–21, 15–14, 14–19, 15–11
Pts: Josimar Ayarza, Rodríguez 14; Rebs: Romero 11; Asts: Gaskins 4		Pts: Girón 18; Rebs: Gutiérrez 11; Asts: Stoll 4

Ginásio de Esportes Geraldo Magalhães, Recife
Referees: Andrés Bartel (URU), Carlos Vélez (COL), Diego Chiconato (BRA)

5 September 2022
13:40

Boxscore

Mexico	74–80	Venezuela
Scoring by quarter: 29–19, 13–16, 13–27, 19–18
Pts: Jaimes 16; Rebs: Bonilla 7 Asts: Stoll 10		Pts: Materán 19; Rebs: Ascanio, Graterol 6 Asts: Sifontes 11

Ginásio de Esportes Geraldo Magalhães, Recife
Referees: Guilherme Locatelli (BRA), Kristian Paez (ECU), Carlos Vélez (COL)

5 September 2022
17:40

Boxscore

Panama	58–88	United States
Scoring by quarter: 12–29, 18–28, 10–16, 18–15
Pts: Hall Machore 12; Rebs: King 5 Asts: three players 3		Pts: Cole 17; Rebs: Clark 11; Asts: Pargo 6

Ginásio de Esportes Geraldo Magalhães, Recife
Referees: Andrés Bartel (URU), Felipe Ibarra (CHI), Diego Chiconato (BRA)

6 September 2022
15:10 (Note: The United States vs Venezuela match was postponed at halftime due to rain leaks in the stadium and later rescheduled to 6 September.)

Boxscore

United States	101–49	Venezuela
Scoring by quarter: 21–10, 27–11, 22–12, 31–16
Pts: Sword 19; Rebs: Zimmerman 11; Asts: Cole 6		Pts: three players 7 Rebs: Bolívar 6 Asts: three players 2

Ginásio de Esportes Geraldo Magalhães, Recife
Referees: Guilherme Locatelli (BRA), Juan Fernández (ARG), Kristian Paez (ECU)

=== Ranking of third-placed teams ===
Pos	Grp	Team	Pld	W	L	PF	PA	PD	Pts	Qualification
1	C	Venezuela	3	2	1	201	233	−32	5	Advance to Quarterfinals
2	B	Dominican Republic	3	1	2	237	236	+1	4	Advance to Quarterfinals
3	A	Colombia	3	1	2	191	226	−35	4	

Source: FIBA
Rules for classification: 1) Points; 2) Points difference; 3) Points scored.

== Knockout stage ==
The matchups were as follows:

- Best first placed-team against second best third-placed team.
- Second best first-placed team against best third-placed team
- Third best first-placed team against the second best second placed-team.
- Remaining second placed teams.

Rank	Team	Grp	Pos	Pts	PD	PF
1	Brazil	A	1	6	+59	248
2	Argentina	B	1	6	+58	284
3	United States	C	1	5	+76	256
4	Mexico	C	2	5	+5	212
5	Canada	A	2	5	−2	209
6	Puerto Rico	B	2	5	−4	250
7	Venezuela	C	3	5	−32	201
8	Dominican Republic	B	3	4	+1	237

=== Bracket ===
Quarter-finals
8 September
Brazil	80
Dominican Republic	68
8 September
Mexico	77
Canada	82
8 September
Argentina	76
Venezuela	53
8 September
United States	85
Puerto Rico	84

Semi-finals
10 September
Brazil	86
Canada	76
10 September
Argentina	82
United States	73

Final
11 September
Brazil	73
Argentina	75
Third place
11 September
Canada	80
United States	84

=== Quarter-finals ===
8 September 2022
11:10

Boxscore

Mexico	77–82	Canada
Scoring by quarter: 19–17, 11–13, 22–24, 25–28
Pts: Amigo 20; Rebs: Jaimes 10; Asts: Bonilla 7		Pts: Banton 16; Rebs: Bell-Haynes 6 Asts: Banton 7

Ginásio de Esportes Geraldo Magalhães, Recife
Referees: Jorge Vázquez (PUR), Carlos Peralta (ECU), Juan Fernández (ARG)

8 September 2022
13:40

Boxscore

United States	85–84	Puerto Rico
Scoring by quarter: 23–27, 19–15, 22–18, 21–24
Pts: Cole 20; Rebs: Clark 7 Asts: Clark 6		Pts: Thompson, Waters 16; Rebs: Reyes, Romero 7 Asts: Waters 12

Ginásio de Esportes Geraldo Magalhães, Recife
Referees: Guilherme Locatelli (BRA), Julio Anaya (PAN), Kristian Paez (ECU)

8 September 2022
17:40

Boxscore

Argentina	76–53	Venezuela
Scoring by quarter: 21–18, 23–4, 18–10, 14–21
Pts: three players 12; Rebs: Laprovíttola, Deck 5 Asts: Campazzo 6		Pts: Materán 15; Rebs: Ascanio 8 Asts: Betancourt, Sifontes 4

Ginásio de Esportes Geraldo Magalhães, Recife
Referees: Andrés Bartel (URU), Krishna Domínguez (MEX), Andreia Silva (BRA)

8 September 2022
20:10

Boxscore

Brazil	80–68	Dominican Republic
Scoring by quarter: 18–20, 16–17, 21–18, 25–13
Pts: Felício 16; Rebs: De Paula, Meindl 7 Asts: Huertas 6		Pts: Feliz, Rodríguez 14; Rebs: Suero, Rodríguez 7 Asts: Feliz 4

Ginásio de Esportes Geraldo Magalhães, Recife
Referees: Roberto Vázquez (PUR), Daniel García (VEN), Jenna Reneau (USA)

=== Semi-finals ===
10 September 2022
17:10

Boxscore

Argentina	82–73	United States
Scoring by quarter: 20–17, 20–16, 18–19, 24–21
Pts: Deck 30; Rebs: Deck 7 Asts: Campazzo 7		Pts: Cole 18; Rebs: Cheatham 8 Asts: Pargo 8

Ginásio de Esportes Geraldo Magalhães, Recife
Referees: Daniel García (VEN), Andrés Bartel (URU), Kristian Paez (ECU)

10 September 2022
20:40

Boxscore

Brazil	86–76	Canada
Scoring by quarter: 24–20, 20–14, 23–20, 19–22
Pts: Meindl 19; Rebs: Dias 8 Asts: Huertas 8		Pts: Blair 24; Rebs: Bell-Haynes 6 Asts: Banton, Bell-Haynes 4

Ginásio de Esportes Geraldo Magalhães, Recife
Referees: Julio Anaya (PAN), Krishna Domínguez (MEX), Carlos Vélez (COL)

=== Third place game ===
11 September 2022
17:10

Boxscore

Canada	80–84	United States
Scoring by quarter: 16–15, 20–14, 21–25, 23–30
Pts: Kigab 18; Rebs: three players 5 Asts: Gray 7		Pts: Clark 18; Rebs: Zimmerman 8 Asts: Cole 8

Ginásio de Esportes Geraldo Magalhães, Recife
Referees: Guilherme Locatelli (BRA), Daniel García (VEN), Kristian Paez (ECU)

=== Final ===
11 September 2022
20:40

Boxscore

Brazil	73–75	Argentina
Scoring by quarter: 14–26, 24–22, 22–19, 13–8
Pts: Benite 18; Rebs: Mineiro 6 Asts: dos Santos 9		Pts: Deck 20; Rebs: Laprovíttola 8 Asts: Campazzo 5

Ginásio de Esportes Geraldo Magalhães, Recife
Attendance: 16,000
Referees: Jorge Vázquez (PUR), Julio Anaya (PAN), Omar Bermúdez (MEX)

Team details

Starters:			Pts	Reb	Ast
C	6	Cristiano Felício	0	2	0
SG	7	Didi Louzada	4	0	0
SG	9	Marcelo Huertas	11	2	0
SF	14	Léonardo Meindl	6	4	0
PF	19	Lucas Dias	6	5	0
Reserves:					
PG	2	Yago dos Santos	11	5	9
G	5	Rafa Luz	0	0	0
SG	8	Vítor Benite	18	1	2
F	12	Rafael Mineiro	2	6	0
C	23	Augusto Lima	4	5	2
C	28	Lucas Mariano	3	0	1
G	32	Georginho de Paula	8	3	1
Head coach:
(Brazilian Basketball Confederation) Gustavo de Conti

Brazil	Argentina

Brazil	Statistics	Argentina
14/29 (48.3%)	2-pt field goals	13/23 (56.5%)
11/39 (28.2%)	3-pt field goals	10/33 (30.3%)
12/16 (73.5%)	Free throws	19/21 (90.5%)
24	Offensive rebounds	31
13	Defensive rebounds	7
37	Total rebounds	38
15	Assists	12
9	Turnovers	13
8	Steals	5
4	Blocks	2

Starters:			Pts	Reb	Ast
PG	7	Facundo Campazzo	13	4	5
PG	8	Nicolás Laprovíttola	15	8	4
SG	10	Carlos Delfino	3	0	0
C	12	Marcos Delía	4	4	1
SF	14	Gabriel Deck	20	7	1
Reserves:					
SF	9	Nicolás Brussino	7	2	0
PG	11	Jose Vildoza	0	0	0
SF	22	Juan Pablo Vaulet	2	3	1
SG	31	Leandro Bolmaro	9	2	0
C	83	Tayavek Gallizzi	2	1	0
Head coach:
(Argentine Basketball Confederation) Pablo Prigioni

== Final standings ==
Rank	Team	GP	W/L	PF	PA	PD	Pts
1st place, gold medalist(s)	Argentina	6	6–0	517	425	92	12
2nd place, silver medalist(s)	Brazil	6	5–1	487	408	79	11
3rd place, bronze medalist(s)	United States	6	4–2	498	426	72	10
4	Canada	6	3–3	447	458	−11	9
5	Mexico	4	2–2	289	289	0	8
6	Puerto Rico	4	2–2	334	339	−5	8
7	Venezuela	4	2–2	254	309	−55	8
8	Dominican Republic	4	1–3	305	316	−11	5
9	Colombia	3	1–2	191	226	−35	4
10	Uruguay	3	0–3	208	230	−22	3
11	Panama	3	0–3	176	225	−49	3
12	Virgin Islands	3	0–3	193	248	−55	3

Qualified for the 2023 Pan American Games

== Statistics and awards ==
=== Statistical leaders ===
==== Players ====
Points

Name	PPG
(Argentina) Gabriel Deck	21.2
(Dominican Republic) Andrés Feliz	17.5
(Argentina) Nicolás Laprovittola	16.5
(Colombia) Jaime Echenique	16.3
(Canada) Dalano Banton	15.7

Rebounds

Name	RPG
(Dominican Republic) Ángel Delgado	9.5
(Puerto Rico) Ismael Romero	8.5
(United States) Stephen Zimmerman	8.0
(United States) Gary Clark	7.3
(Colombia) Jaime Echenique	7.3
(Mexico) Fabián Jaimes	7.3

Assists

Name	APG
(Puerto Rico) Tremont Waters	8.8
(Argentina) Facundo Campazzo	8.3
(Mexico) Paul Stoll	7.3
(United States) Jeremy Pargo	5.7
(Venezuela) Yohanner Sifontes	5.0

Blocks

Name	BPG
(Mexico) Yahir Bonilla	1.8
(Puerto Rico) George Conditt	1.8
(Venezuela) Windi Graterol	1.5
(United States Virgin Islands) Romani Hansen	1.3
(Colombia) Hayner Montaño	1.3
(Panama) Eric Romero	1.3

Steals

Name	SPG
(Argentina) Facundo Campazzo	3.5
(Uruguay) Luciano Parodi	3.0
(Mexico) Paul Stoll	2.8
(Dominican Republic) Richard Bautista	2.5
(Puerto Rico) Tremont Waters	2.0
(United States Virgin Islands) Georgio Milligan	2.0

Efficiency

Name	EFFPG
(Argentina) Gabriel Deck	21.5
(Argentina) Facundo Campazzo	17.5
(Colombia) Jaime Echenique	17.3
(Puerto Rico) Ismael Romero	17.0
(Dominican Republic) Ángel Delgado	16.5
(Puerto Rico) Tremont Waters	16.5

==== Teams ====
Points

Name	PPG
Argentina	86.2
Puerto Rico	83.5
United States	83.0
Brazil	81.2
Dominican Republic	76.3

Rebounds

Name	RPG
Brazil	43.8
Dominican Republic	43.5
United States	39.5
Mexico	38.8
Colombia	38.0

Assists

Name	APG
United States	23.7
Argentina	20.3
Puerto Rico	19.5
Brazil	18.5
Mexico	17.5

Blocks

Name	BPG
Puerto Rico	3.5
Colombia	3.3
United States	3.2
Panama	3.0
Virgin Islands	3.0

Steals

Name	SPG
Puerto Rico	9.3
Mexico	8.8
Virgin Islands	8.3
Uruguay	8.3
Dominican Republic	8.3

Efficiency

Name	EFFPG
United States	100.2
Argentina	99.2
Puerto Rico	97.0
Brazil	94.2
Canada	79.0

=== Awards ===
The awards were announced on 12 September 2022.

Award	Player
All-Tournament Team	(Argentina) Facundo Campazzo
All-Tournament Team	(Brazil) Yago dos Santos
All-Tournament Team	(United States) Norris Cole
All-Tournament Team	(Canada) Dalano Banton
All-Tournament Team	(Argentina) Gabriel Deck
Most Valuable Player	(Argentina) Gabriel Deck
