= 2025 Turkish Basketball Cup =

- Season: 2024–25
- Duration: 11–16 February
- Games played: 7
- Teams: 8
- TV partner: TRT Spor Yıldız

Finals
- Champions: Fenerbahçe Beko (9th title)
- Runners-up: Beşiktaş Fibabanka

Awards
- Final MVP: (United States) Nigel Hayes-Davis

The 2025 Turkish Basketball Cup (Turkish: 2025 Basketbol Erkekler Türkiye Kupası), also known as ING Erkekler Türkiye Kupası for sponsorship reasons, was the 38th edition of Turkey's top-tier level professional national domestic basketball cup competition. The quarterfinals of tournament will be hold from 11 and 12 February 2025 in 4 different locations, followed by the semi-finals and the final held from 14 to 16 February 2025 at the 11 Nisan Spor Salonu in Şanlıurfa, Turkey.

== Qualified teams ==
The top eight placed teams after the first half of the top-tier level Basketball Super League 2024–25 season qualified for the tournament. The four highest-placed teams played against the lowest-seeded teams in the quarter-finals. The competition will be played under a single elimination format.

Pos	Team	Pld	W	L	PF	PA	PD	Pts	Seeding
1	Fenerbahçe Beko	15	14	1	1360	1191	+169	29	Seeded
2	Tofaş	15	12	3	1324	1243	+81	27	Seeded
3	Anadolu Efes	15	11	4	1332	1185	+147	26	Seeded
4	Galatasaray Basketbol	15	10	5	1326	1248	+78	25	Seeded
5	Beşiktaş Fibabanka	15	10	5	1313	1236	+77	25	Unseeded
6	Bahçeşehir Koleji	15	9	6	1206	1170	+36	24	Unseeded
7	Karşıyaka Basket	15	8	7	1344	1295	+49	23	Unseeded
8	Mersin MSK	15	8	7	1196	1249	−53	23	Unseeded

Source: Basketbol Süper Ligi

== Draw ==
The 2025 Turkish Basketball Cup was drawn on 27 January 2025. The seeded teams were paired in the quarterfinals with the non-seeded teams.

== Bracket ==
Quarterfinals; 11–12 February
1	Fenerbahçe Beko	87
6	Bahçeşehir Koleji	56
4	Galatasaray Ekmas	97
7	Pınar Karşıyaka	88
2	Tofaş	95
8	Mersin MSK	101
3	Anadolu Efes	80
5	Beşiktaş Fibabanka	85

Semifinals; February 14
1	Fenerbahçe Beko	89
4	Galatasaray Ekmas	74
5	Beşiktaş Fibabanka	83
8	Mersin MSK	63

Final; 16 February
1	Fenerbahçe Beko	104
5	Beşiktaş Fibabanka	81

== Quarterfinals ==
Note: All times are TRT (UTC+3) as listed by Turkish Basketball Federation.

11 February 2025 QF	Karşıyaka	88–97	Galatasaray	Karşıyaka, İzmir
18:00	Scoring by quarter: 16–22, 33–22, 15–27, 24–26
TRT Spor Yıldız	Pts: Gallinat 24; Rebs: Yaşar 9 Asts: Yılmaz 8 PIR: Yaşar 29	Boxscore	Pts: Livingston II 25; Rebs: Delgado 12; Asts: Palmer, Tuncer 5 PIR: Delgado 29	Arena: Karşıyaka Arena; Referees: Alper Altuğ Köselerli, Ziya Özorhon, Alper Gökçebel

11 February 2025 QF	Fenerbahçe Beko	87–56	Bahçeşehir Koleji	Istanbul
20:30	Scoring by quarter: 22–7, 27–18, 21–13, 17–18
TRT Spor Yıldız	Pts: Hayes-Davis 14; Rebs: Biberović, Melli 5 Asts: Baldwin IV 7 PIR: Hayes-Davis 17	Boxscore	Pts: Odiase 15; Rebs: Bouteille, Simonović 7 Asts: Sipahi 5 PIR: Simonović 15	Arena: Ülker Sports Arena; Referees: Can Mavisu, Kaan Büyükçil, Alper Özgök

12 February 2025 QF	Mersin MSK	101–95	Tofaş	Mersin
18:00	Scoring by quarter: 24–23, 21–20, 29–27, 27–25
TRT Spor Yıldız	Pts: Cobbs 27; Rebs: Olaseni 10; Asts: Cruz 9 PIR: Cruz 24	Boxscore	Pts: Reed 23; Rebs: Bankston 5 Asts: Geçim, Pérez 6 PIR: Saybir 26	Arena: Servet Tazegül Spor Salonu; Referees: Yener Yılmaz, Ali Şakacı, Tolga Edis

12 February 2025 QF	Beşiktaş Fibabanka	85–80	Anadolu Efes	Istanbul
20:30	Scoring by quarter: 19–20, 24–21, 18–26, 24–13
TRT Spor Yıldız	Pts: Allman 26; Rebs: Terry 12; Asts: three players 4 PIR: Terry 28	Boxscore	Pts: Bryant 25; Rebs: Nwora, Šmits 7 Asts: Bryant 8 PIR: Bryant 29	Arena: Akatlar Arena; Referees: Ali Serkan Emlek, Mehmet Karabilecen, Tolga Akkuşoğlu

== Semifinals ==
14 February 2025 SF	Mersin MSK	63–83	Beşiktaş Fibabanka	Şanlıurfa
18:00	Scoring by quarter: 12–23, 21–16, 22–21, 8–23
TRT Spor Yıldız	Pts: Cobbs 16; Rebs: Olaseni 9 Asts: Cobbs 8 PIR: Cobbs 24	Boxscore	Pts: Mathews 18; Rebs: Sleva 6 Asts: Allman 6 PIR: Sleva 24	Arena: 11 Nisan Spor Salonu; Referees: Emin Moğulkoç, Kerem Baki, Ayşe Nur Yazıcıoğlu

14 February 2025 SF	Fenerbahçe Beko	89–74	Galatasaray	Şanlıurfa
20:30	Scoring by quarter: 22–16, 20–19, 22–11, 25–28
TRT Spor Yıldız	Pts: Hayes-Davis 18; Rebs: Hall 5 Asts: Baldwin IV 5 PIR: Hayes-Davis 20	Boxscore	Pts: Cummings 22; Rebs: Delgado 9 Asts: Tuncer 5 PIR: Cummings, Tuncer 18	Arena: 11 Nisan Spor Salonu; Referees: Mehmet Şahin, Hüseyin Çelik, Uğur Akyıldız

== Final ==
16 February 2025 F	Fenerbahçe Beko	104–81	Beşiktaş Fibabanka	Şanlıurfa
16:00 TRT (UTC +3)	Scoring by quarter: 27–19, 31–21, 24–20, 22–21
TRT Spor Yıldız	Pts: Hayes-Davis 22; Rebs: Hayes-Davis 9 Asts: Biberović 5 PIR: Hayes-Davis 27	Boxscore	Pts: Needham 20; Rebs: Terry 6 Asts: Needham 5 PIR: Needham 25	Arena: 11 Nisan Spor Salonu; Referees: Mehmet Şahin, Kerem Baki, Hüseyin Çelik

Starters:			Pts	Reb	Ast
PG	0	(United States) Errick McCollum	13	1	4
SG	23	(Serbia) Marko Gudurić	6	2	1
SF	13	(Turkey) Tarik Biberović	10	3	5
PF	11	(United States) Nigel Hayes-Davis	22	9	3
C	92	(Canada) Khem Birch	8	4	0
Reserves:					
F	1	(Turkey) Metecan Birsen	3	0	0
G	2	(United States) Wade Baldwin IV	9	5	4
F/C	4	(Italy) Nicolò Melli	0	4	3
C	5	(Turkey) Sertaç Şanlı	14	5	0
SG	10	(Turkey) Melih Mahmutoğlu	5	0	2
SG	15	(Turkey) Mert Emre Ekşioğlu	0	0	0
G	20	(United States) Devon Hall	14	0	2
Head coach:
(Lithuania) Šarūnas Jasikevičius

Fenerbahçe	Beşiktaş

Fenerbahçe	Statistics	Beşiktaş
18/32 (56.3%)	2-point field goals	20/37 (54.1%)
16/29 (55.2%)	3-point field goals	9/18 (50.0%)
20/25 (80.0%)	Free throws	14/21 (66.7%)
10	Offensive rebounds	4
23	Defensive rebounds	18
33	Total rebounds	22
24	Assists	18
6	Steals	7
10	Turnovers	10
1	Blocks	1

Starters:			Pts	Reb	Ast
PG	6	(Turkey) Berk Uğurlu	11	0	1
SG	5	(Montenegro) Derek Needham	20	5	5
SF	2	(United States) Jonah Mathews	11	0	4
PF	14	(United States) Dustin Sleva	8	2	2
C	33	(United States) Emanuel Terry	7	6	0
Reserves:					
SG	0	(United States) Kyle Allman Jr.	8	1	4
C	3	(Serbia) Uroš Plavšić	4	2	1
SG	7	(Turkey) Yiğit Arslan	5	0	1
PF	9	(Canada) Conor Morgan	3	3	0
PG	10	(Turkey) Yağız Aksu	DNP		
PF	20	(Turkey) Kerem Konan	4	3	0
SF	22	(Turkey) Ata Özbek	DNP		
Head coach:
(Serbia) Dušan Alimpijević

2025 Turkish Cup Winners
Fenerbahçe Beko
(9th title)

== See also ==
- 2024–25 Basketbol Süper Ligi
