= Ginásio de Esportes Geraldo Magalhães =

Indoor sporting arena in Brazil

- Geraldão
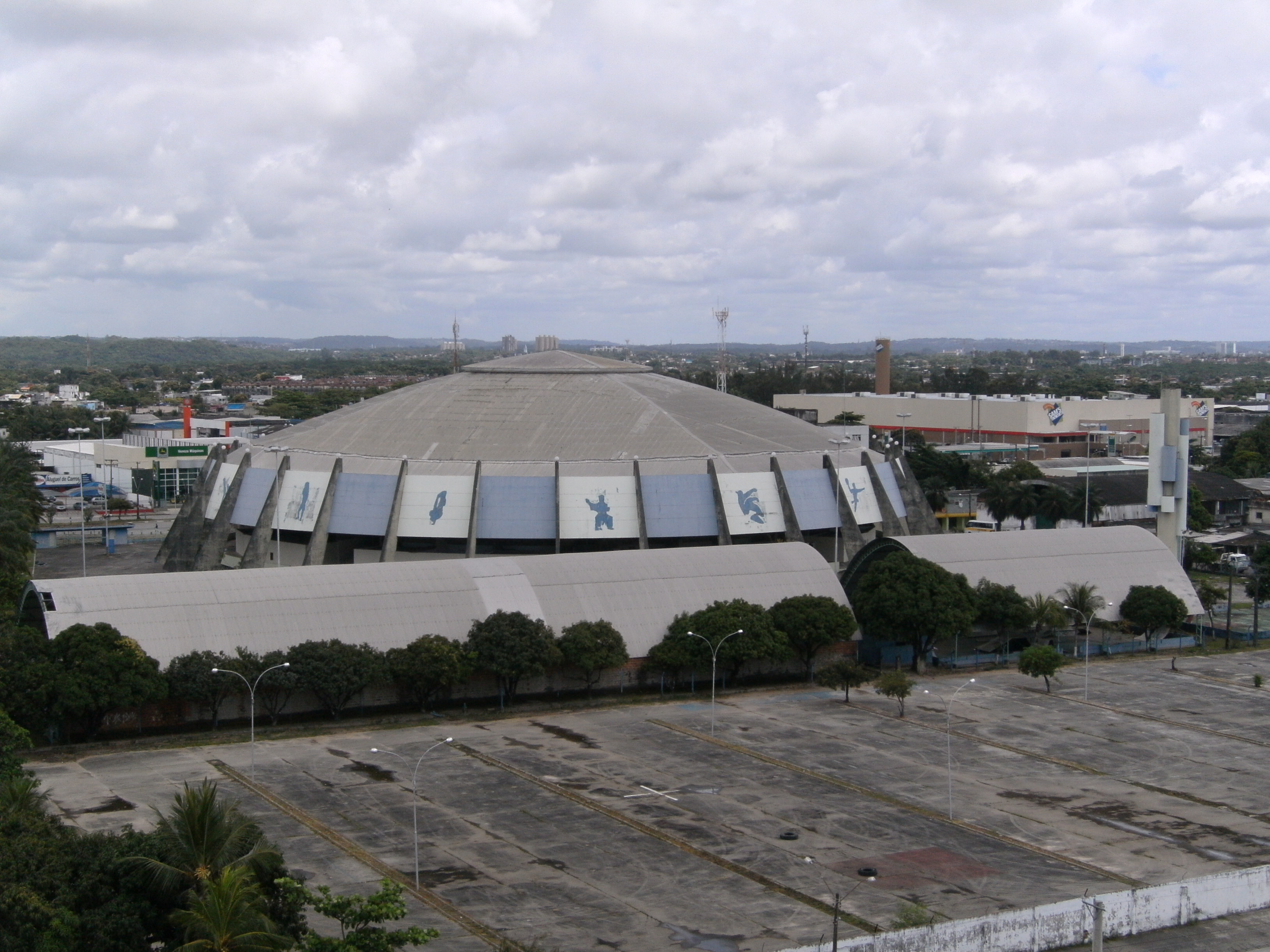
- Interactive map of Ginásio de Esportes Geraldo Magalhães
- Full name: Ginásio de Esportes Geraldo Magalhães
- Location: Recife, Brazil
- Coordinates: 8°7′1″S 34°54′45″W
- Capacity: 15,000

Construction
- Opened: November 12, 1970

Ginásio de Esportes Geraldo Magalhães, also known as the Geraldão, is an indoor sporting arena located in Recife, Brazil. The capacity of the arena is 15,000 spectators and opened in 1970. It hosts indoor sporting events such as basketball and volleyball, and also hosts concerts.

== See also ==
- List of indoor arenas in Brazil
