= Michael Young (basketball, born 1994) =

American basketball player

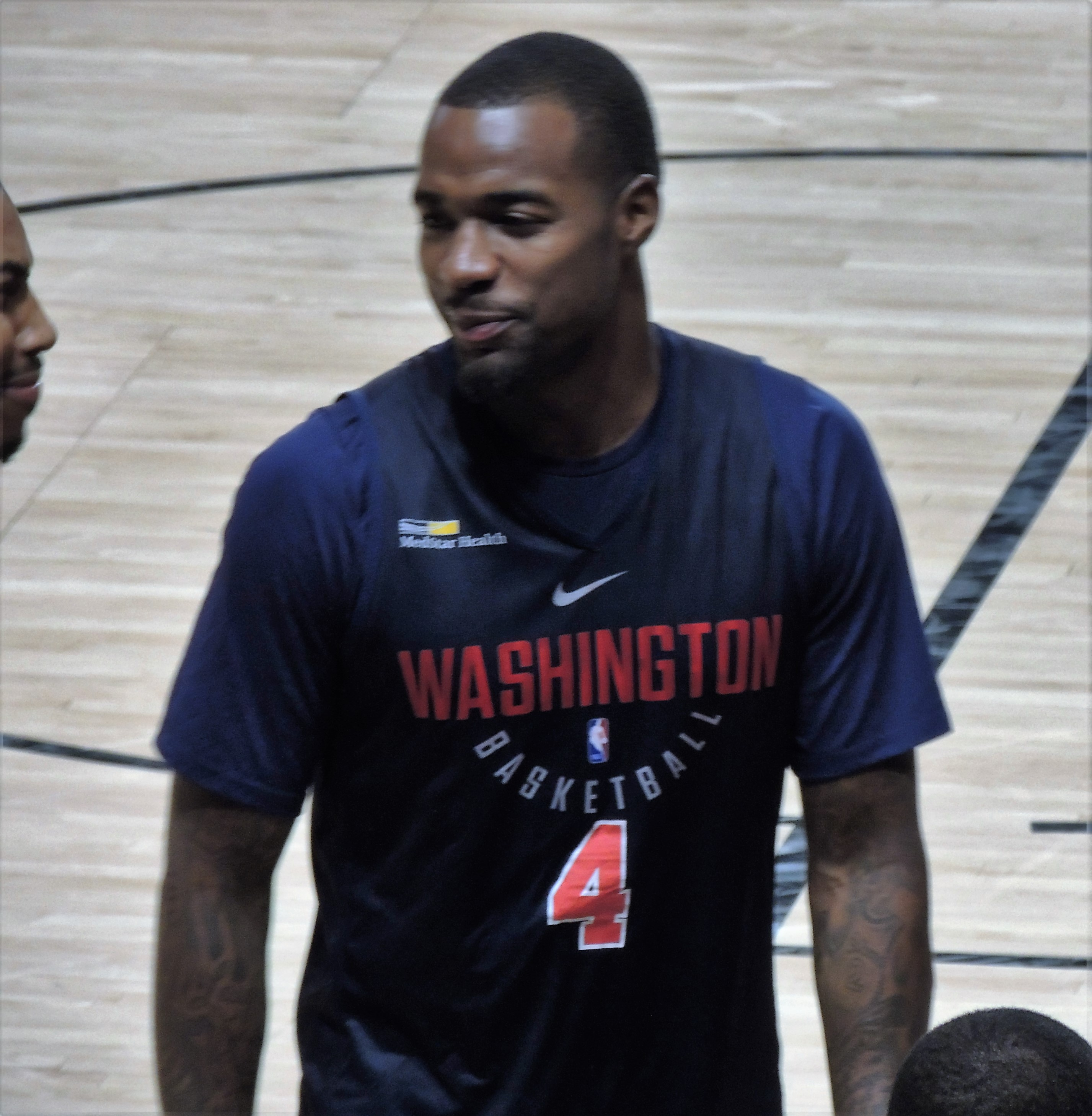
- Young at Washington Wizards training camp in 2017

No. 2 – KK Bosna Royal
- Position: Power forward
- League: Bosnian League; ABA League

Personal information
- Born: September 5, 1994 (age 32) Pittsburgh, Pennsylvania, U.S.
- Listed height: 6 ft 8 in (2.03 m)
- Listed weight: 230 lb (104 kg)

Career information
- High school: St. Benedict's Prep (Newark, New Jersey)
- College: Pittsburgh (2013–2017)
- NBA draft: 2017: undrafted
- Playing career: 2017–present

Career history
- 2017: Delaware 87ers
- 2017–2018: Northern Arizona Suns
- 2018: Leones de Ponce
- 2018–2019: Cholet
- 2019: Hebei Xianglan
- 2019: Dijon
- 2020: Hapoel Gilboa Galil
- 2020: Al Nasr
- 2020–2021: Ironi Nahariya
- 2021–2022: Stal Ostrów Wielkopolski
- 2022–2023: Kawasaki Brave Thunders
- 2023–2024: Bursaspor
- 2024: Indios de Mayagüez
- 2024: Anyang Jung Kwan Jang Red Boosters
- 2024–2025: Galatasaray
- 2025–: KK Bosna BH Telecom

Career highlights
- Polish Cup winner (2022); 2× Third-team All-ACC (2016, 2017)
- Stats at Basketball Reference

Michael Lamor Young Jr. (born September 5, 1994) is an American basketball player for Galatasaray of the Basketbol Süper Ligi (BSL). Young played college basketball for the Pittsburgh Panthers of the Atlantic Coast Conference.

== Early years ==
Young went to St. Benedict's Prep in Newark, New Jersey and graduated in 2013 where he led Saint Benedict's to the National High School Invitational and finished runner-up, and also the New Jersey Prep High. During his senior year he led his team to a No. 2 ranking from both USA Today and MaxPreps. He helped guide St. Benedicts to the NHSI National Championship they finished as the runner up when they lost to Montverde Academy in the championship game 65–67.

During his senior campaign he was invited to the Jordan Brand Classic at the Barclays Center where he put up 19 points. Young also attended more prestigious basketball camps including Reebok Breakout Challenge, Five Star camp, Adidas Uprising and Hoop Group Elite. Young finished his high school career with 1,445 points and was ranked as the 56th overall recruit in the nation and the 14th best power forward in the nation by ESPN.

College recruiting
Name	Hometown	School	Height	Weight	Commit date
Michael Young; PF	Duquesne, Pennsylvania	St. Benedict's Prep	6 ft 8 in (2.03 m)	235 lb (107 kg)	Aug 4, 2012
Michael Young; PF	Recruit ratings: Scout: Rivals: 247Sports: (87)				
Overall recruit ranking: Scout: 15 (PF) Rivals: 16 (PF)
Note: In many cases, Scout, Rivals, 247Sports, On3, and ESPN may conflict in their listings of height and weight.; In these cases, the average was taken. ESPN grades are on a 100-point scale.; Sources: "2013 Player Commits". ESPN.; "2013 Team Ranking". Rivals.

== College career ==
=== Freshman year ===
Young started all 36 games for the Panthers. He was named to the All-ACC Academic Team which he called a huge accomplishment and was extremely proud. He averaged 6 points, just over four rebounds per game and scored in double digits in five games during the season. He put up nine points and three rebounds during his first NCAA Tournament game vs the Colorado Buffaloes in the 2014 NCAA Men's Division I Basketball Tournament during the opening round and scored four points in a loss to the No. 1 seed Florida Gators in the third round.

=== Sophomore year ===
During his sophomore year Young saw a huge increase in scored as earned All-ACC honorable mention by coaches in media, he averaged 13.4 points and 7.3 rebounds. He led the team in scored during 11 games and led in rebounding 17 times. He scored a season-high 27 points vs Chaminade Silverswords.

=== Junior year ===
Young during his junior year scored 20 points or more 11 times and averaged 15.7 points per game and 7.3 rebounds per game. And received All-ACC Third team awards and other All-ACC honors as well. He ranked 13th in the ACC in scoring, 12th in rebounds and 5th in field goal percentage. He led the team in scored and FG percentage. He also had a then career high four double-doubles.

=== Senior year ===
In the first four games of his senior year Young averaged 23 points per game and 8 rebounds per game leading Pitt to an 8–2 record. He scored a career high 30 points and grabbed 8 rebounds in a 78–76 win over Marquette. And almost matched that total 20 days later when he score 29 points and 9 rebound en route to an 81–73 win over Penn State at the Never Forget Tribute Classic.

=== College statistics ===
Year	Team	GP	GS	MPG	FG%	3P%	FT%	RPG	APG	SPG	BPG	PPG
2013–14	Pittsburgh	36	36	21.6	.413	.357	.817	4.1	0.9	0.4	0.4	6.0
2014–15	Pittsburgh	34	33	31.7	.530	.294	.693	7.3	1.3	0.8	0.6	13.4
2015–16	Pittsburgh	33	33	29.4	.537	.333	.777	6.9	2.3	0.5	0.3	15.7
2016–17	Pittsburgh	33	32	33.2	.453	.341	.778	6.8	2.7	0.8	0.6	19.6

== Professional career ==
=== Washington Wizards / G-League (2017–2018) ===
After going undrafted in the 2017 NBA draft, Young was signed to a two-way contract by the Washington Wizards of the NBA. Under the terms of the deal, he was projected to split playing time between the Wizards and games in the G League under a designated spot best fitting Washington's area, since they did not hold a squad there at the time. He had previously been assigned to the Delaware 87ers for four games earlier in the season before being assigned to the Northern Arizona Suns on November 13, 2017. Young remained under contract with the Wizards until January 3, 2018, when they waived his contract without playing a game for the team. On January 6, 2018, the Northern Arizona Suns of the NBA G League announced they had acquired Young as a returning player.

=== Leones de Ponce (2018) ===
On April 11, 2018, Young signed with Leones de Ponce of the Baloncesto Superior Nacional.

=== Cholet Basket (2018–2019) ===
On July 30, 2018, Young signed with Cholet Basket of the LNB Pro A.

=== JDA Dijon (2019) ===
On July 23, 2019, Young signed with JDA Dijon Basket of the LNB Pro A. On December 5, 2019, his contract has been terminated by his club.

=== Hapoel Gilboa Galil (2020) ===
On January 12, 2020, Young signed with Hapoel Gilboa Galil of the Israeli Premier League as an injury cover for Justin Tillman. On January 18, 2020, Young recorded 19 points in his debut, while shooting 8-of-15 from the field, along with seven rebounds in a 96–80 win over Ironi Nes Ziona. In 18 games, Young averaged 17.1 points, 6.7 rebounds and 2.0 assists per game, helping his team reach the semifinals.

=== Al Nasr (2020) ===
On August 25, 2020, Young signed with Al Nasr of the UAE National Basketball League.

=== Ironi Nahariya (2020–2021) ===
On December 1, 2020, Young signed with Ironi Nahariya of the Israeli Premier League. He averaged 15 points, 6 rebounds and 2 assists per game.

=== Stal Ostrów Wielkopolski (2021–2022) ===
On July 21, 2021, Young signed with Stal Ostrów Wielkopolski of the Polish Basketball League.

=== Bursaspor (2023–2024) ===
On July 27, 2023, Young signed with Bursaspor of the Turkish Basketbol Süper Ligi (BSL).

=== Anyang Jung Kwan Jang Red Boosters (2024) ===
On July 25, 2024, Young signed with Anyang Jung Kwan Jang Red Boosters of the Korean Basketball League. On December 15, he was replaced by Cliff Alexander.

=== Galatasaray (2024–2025) ===
On December 18, 2024, Young signed with Galatasaray of the Turkish Basketbol Süper Ligi (BSL).

On June 20, 2025, Galatasaray thanked the player and announced that they had parted ways.
