= Ebuka Izundu =

Serbian basketball player born in Nigeria

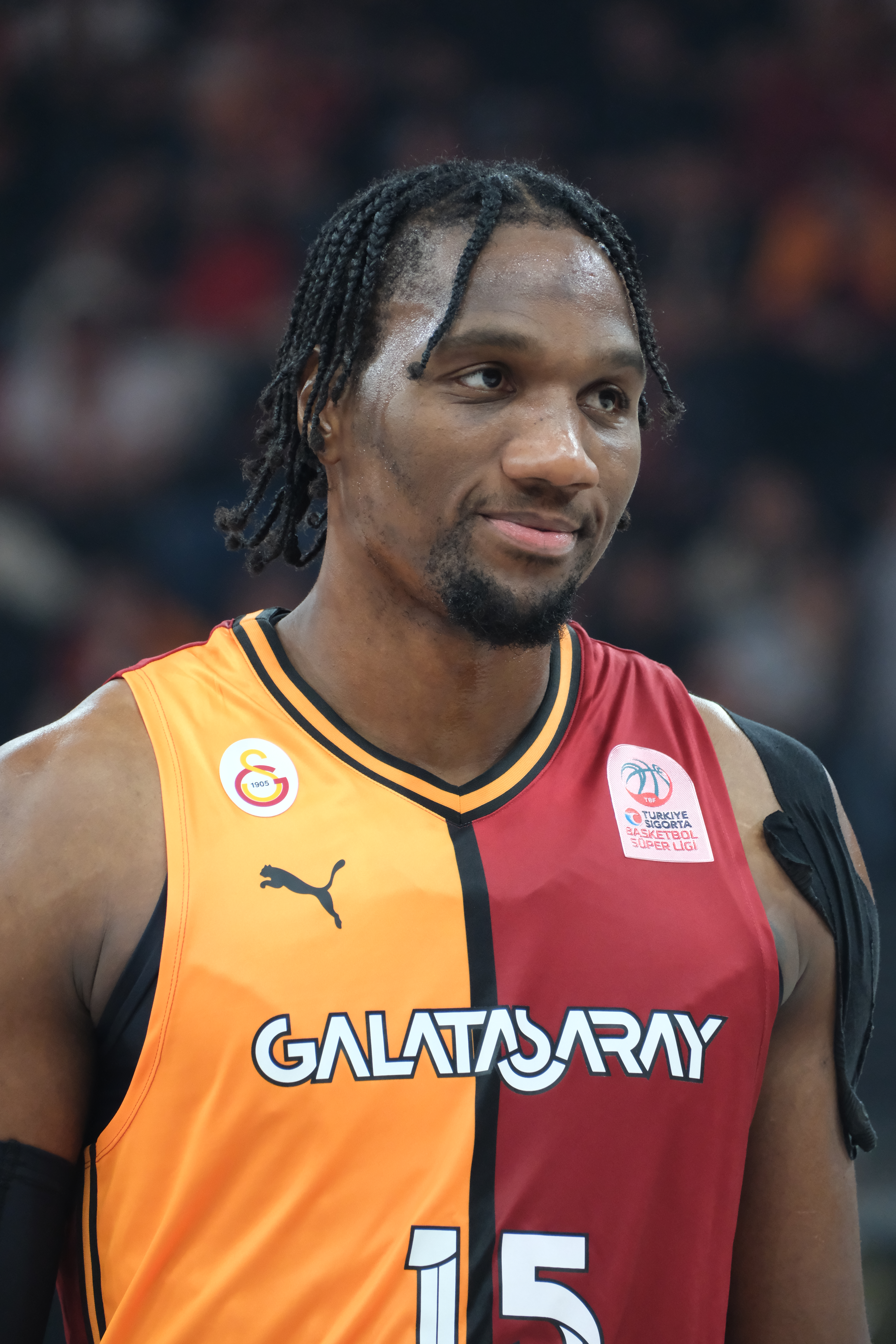
- Izundu with Galatasaray in 2025

No. 15 – Crvena zvezda
- Position: Center
- League: KLS; ABA League; EuroLeague

Personal information
- Born: 28 June 1996 (age 29) Lagos, Nigeria
- Listed height: 6 ft 10 in (2.08 m)
- Listed weight: 232 lb (105 kg)

Career information
- High school: Victory Christian (Charlotte, North Carolina)
- College: Miami (Florida) (2015–2019)
- NBA draft: 2019: undrafted
- Playing career: 2019–present

Career history
- 2019–2020: Real Betis
- 2020: SIG Strasbourg
- 2021–2023: FMP
- 2023–2024: Baskets Oldenburg
- 2024–2025: Galatasaray Ekmas
- 2025–present: Crvena zvezda

Career highlights
- Serbian Cup winner (2026)

Ebuka Rufus Izundu (born 28 June 1996) is a Nigerian professional basketball player for KK Crvena zvezda of the Basketball League of Serbia (KLS). He played college basketball for the Miami Hurricanes from 2015 to 2019.

== Early life ==
Izundu was born and brought up in Lagos, Nigeria. He grew up playing soccer and began playing basketball at age 16 on account of his height. Izundu played basketball for two years at Victory Christian Center School in Charlotte, North Carolina for two years. As a senior, he averaged 21 points, 15 rebounds and six blocks per game. Izundu also played soccer and ran track in high school. On 12 November 2014, he committed to play college basketball for Charlotte. However, he reopened his recruitment after the program parted ways with head coach Alan Major. On 13 May 2015, Izundu committed to Miami (Florida).

== College career ==
Izundu played four years of college basketball for Miami, mostly coming off the bench until his senior season. As a sophomore, Izundu averaged 4.2 points and 3.0 rebounds per game. He averaged 5.0 points and 3.8 rebounds per game as a junior. On 13 November 2018, he posted career-highs of 22 points and 18 rebounds in a 96–58 win over Stephen F. Austin. As a senior, Izundu started in all 32 games and averaged 10.9 points, 8.3 rebounds and 1.2 blocks per game, shooting a school-record 65.3 percent from the field.

== Professional career ==
Izundu joined the Golden State Warriors for 2019 NBA Summer League and recorded 14 points and 11 rebounds in his finale, an 88–87 loss to the Los Angeles Lakers.

=== Real Betis ===
On 10 August 2019, Izundu signed a two-year contract with Real Betis of the Liga ACB. On 27 October, he scored a season-high 11 points in an 86–81 victory over Andorra. Izundu parted ways with Real Betis on 26 April 2020 and finished the season averaging 4.2 points and 3.1 rebounds in 13.1 minutes per game.

=== SIG Strasbourg ===
On July 17, 2020, he has signed with SIG Strasbourg of the LNB Pro A.

=== FMP ===
In January 2021, Izundu signed for Serbian team FMP. On July 14, 2021, he signed a two-year contract extension with FMP.

=== Baskets Oldenburg ===
On June 19, 2023, he signed with Baskets Oldenburg of the Basketball Bundesliga.

=== Galatasaray ===
On June 11, 2024, he signed with Galatasaray Ekmas of the Basketbol Süper Ligi (BSL).

On June 20, 2025, Galatasaray thanked the player and announced that they had parted ways.

=== Crvena zezda ===
In June 2025, he signed with Crvena zvezda Meridianbet of the Basketball League of Serbia (KLS). On January 22, 2026, Izundu received a Hoops Agents Player of the Week after having a double-double of 22 points and 12 rebounds.

On April 11, 2026, Izundu had his contract extended until the end of 2028.
