= Ozan Yılmaz =

Turkish-German footballer (born 1988)

Personal information
- Full name: Ozan Yılmaz
- Date of birth: 1 February 1988 (age 38)
- Place of birth: Germany
- Height: 1.80 m (5 ft 11 in)
- Position: Midfielder

Team information
- Current team: TSV Marl-Hüls

Youth career
- TSV Marl-Hüls
- VfB Hüls
- Borussia Dortmund
- –2007: SG Wattenscheid

Senior career*
Years	Team	Apps	(Gls)
2006–2009	SG Wattenscheid	33	(2)
2009–2011	Schwarz-Weiß Essen	59	(5)
2011–2016	Fortuna Köln	85	(10)
2015	Fortuna Köln II	3	(0)
2016–2017	SG Wattenscheid	10	(0)
2017	SpVgg Erkenschwick	14	(0)
2018–	TSV Marl-Hüls	0	(0)

International career
2008	Turkey U20	1	(0)
- * Club domestic league appearances and goals as of 04:43, 14 September 2018 (UTC)

Ozan Yılmaz (born 1 February 1988) is a Turkish-German footballer who plays as a midfielder for TSV Marl-Hüls, where he also is the assistant manager.
