= Romani Hansen =

U.S. Virgin Islander basketball player

No. 3 – Diablos De Miranda
- Position: Forward
- League: Superliga Profesional de Baloncesto

Personal information
- Born: 4 February 1997 (age 29) Saint Croix, U.S. Virgin Islands
- Listed height: 2.03 m (6 ft 8 in)
- Listed weight: 200 lb (91 kg)

Career information
- High school: Mount Saint Michael
- College: Pensacola State (2016–2017); Independence CC (2017–2018); Savannah State (2018-2019); Albany (2019-2020)
- Playing career: 2020–present

Career history
- 2020-21: Maia
- 2021-22: Tampereen Pyrintö
- 2022-2022: Starwings Basel
- 2023-2024: Hoops Club
- 2024: Institución Atlética Larre Borges

Romani Hansen is a U.S. Virgin Islander basketball player.

== College career ==
In June 2016, he signed with Pensacola State College.

In 2018-19, Hansen also played one season at Savannah State (SSU) where he averaged 9.5 points, 5.5 rebounds and one assist during the 2018-19 season. He led the team with 27 blocks, tied for the team lead with 67 made free throws and shot 44 percent from the field. Hansen had a career-highs of 20 points against Morgan State and 11 rebounds against Delaware State.

== U.S. Virgin Islands national team ==
Hansen has represented the U.S. Virgin Islands national team on several occasions.
