= Buğrahan Tuncer =

Turkish basketball player

No. 19 – Galatasaray
- Position: Point guard / shooting guard
- League: Basketbol Süper Ligi

Personal information
- Born: March 23, 1993 (age 33) Istanbul, Turkey
- Listed height: 6 ft 4 in (1.93 m)
- Listed weight: 198 lb (90 kg)

Career information
- Playing career: 2009–present

Career history
- 2009–2011: Beşiktaş Cola Turka
- 2011–2013: Aliağa Petkim
- 2013–2014: Mersin BB
- 2014–2015: Eskişehir Basket
- 2015: Yeşilgiresun Belediye
- 2015–2016: Best Balıkesir
- 2016–2018: Eskişehir Basket
- 2018–2023: Anadolu Efes
- 2023–present: Galatasaray

Career highlights
- Turkish Super Cup winner (2022); Turkish Cup winner (2022); 2× EuroLeague champion (2021, 2022); 3× Turkish League champion (2019, 2021, 2023)

Ahmet Buğrahan Tuncer (born March 23, 1993) is a Turkish professional basketball player for Galatasaray of the Basketbol Süper Ligi (BSL). He can play at both the point guard and shooting guard positions.

== Professional career ==
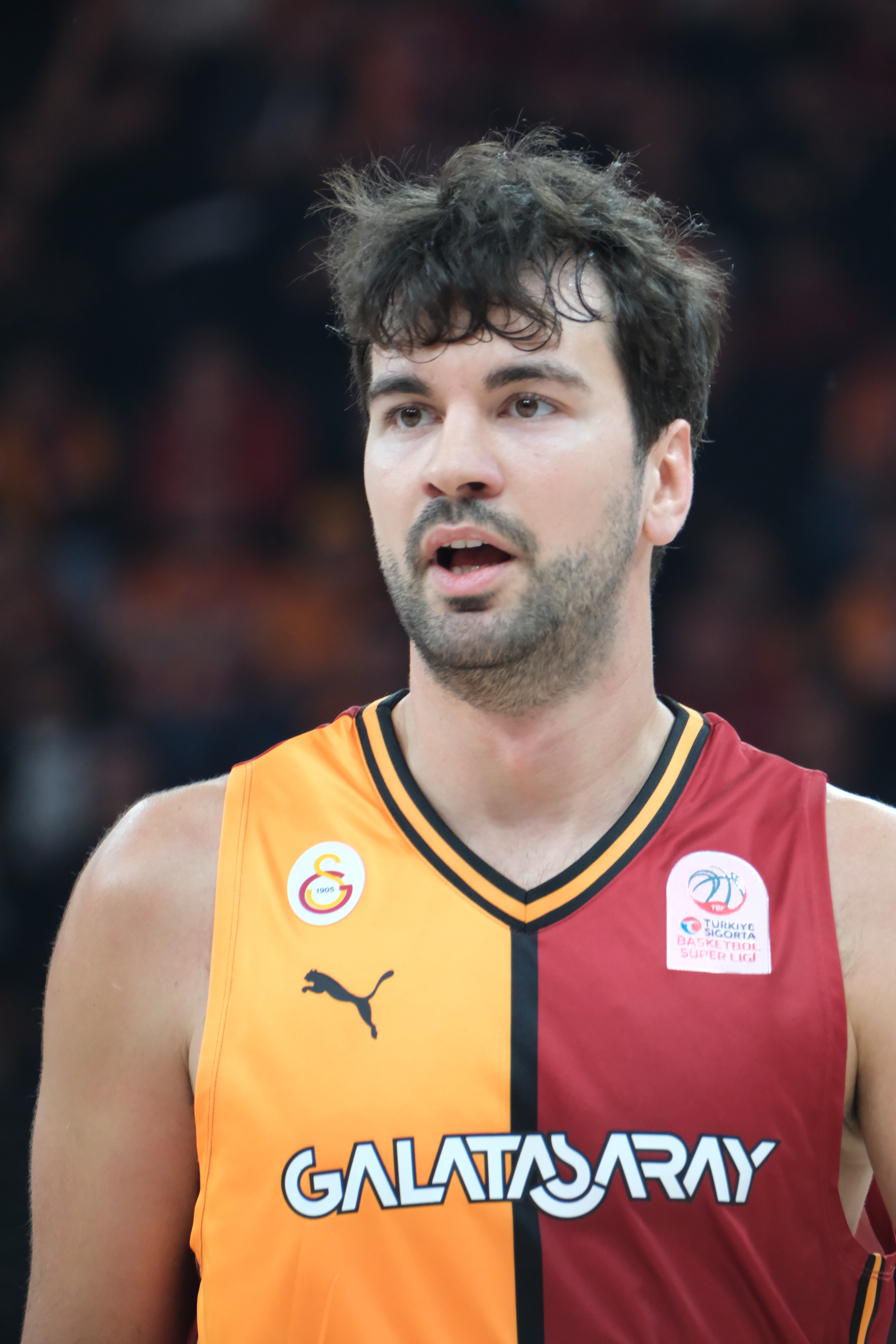
Tuncer in 2025

=== Anadolu Efes ===
Tuncer signed with Turkish powerhouse Anadolu Efes in 2018 and stayed there for five seasons. He averaged 8.2 points per game during the 2019–2020 campaign. He re-signed with Efes on July 10, 2020.

=== Galatasaray ===
On June 24, 2023, he signed with Galatasaray of the Turkish Basketbol Süper Ligi (BSL).

== Career statistics ==
Legend
GP	Games played	GS	Games started	MPG	Minutes per game
FG%	Field-goal percentage	3P%	3-point field-goal percentage	FT%	Free-throw percentage
RPG	Rebounds per game	APG	Assists per game	SPG	Steals per game
BPG	Blocks per game	PPG	Points per game	PIR	Performance index rating
**Bold**	Career high

=== EuroLeague ===
†	Denotes seasons in which Tuncer won the EuroLeague

Year	Team	GP	GS	MPG	FG%	3P%	FT%	RPG	APG	SPG	BPG	PPG	PIR
2018–19	Anadolu Efes	11	**1**	4.5	.211	.154	—	.6	.9	**.5**	—	0.9	0.6
2019–20	Anadolu Efes	9	0	6.7	**.450**	**.462**	**.667**	.4	1.6	.4	—	**2.9**	**3.0**
2020–21†	Anadolu Efes	**16**	0	5.7	.378	.348	—	**1.1**	1.1	.3	—	2.3	2.1
2021–22†	Anadolu Efes	10	0	5.6	.333	.200	.500	.6	.5	.4	—	1.3	1.0
2022–23	Anadolu Efes	7	**1**	**9.1**	.231	.250	—	.6	**1.9**	.4	—	1.1	1.6
Career		53	2	6.1	.337	.299	.600	.7	1.1	.4	—	1.8	1.7
