= Ángel Delgado =

Dominican basketball player (born 1994)

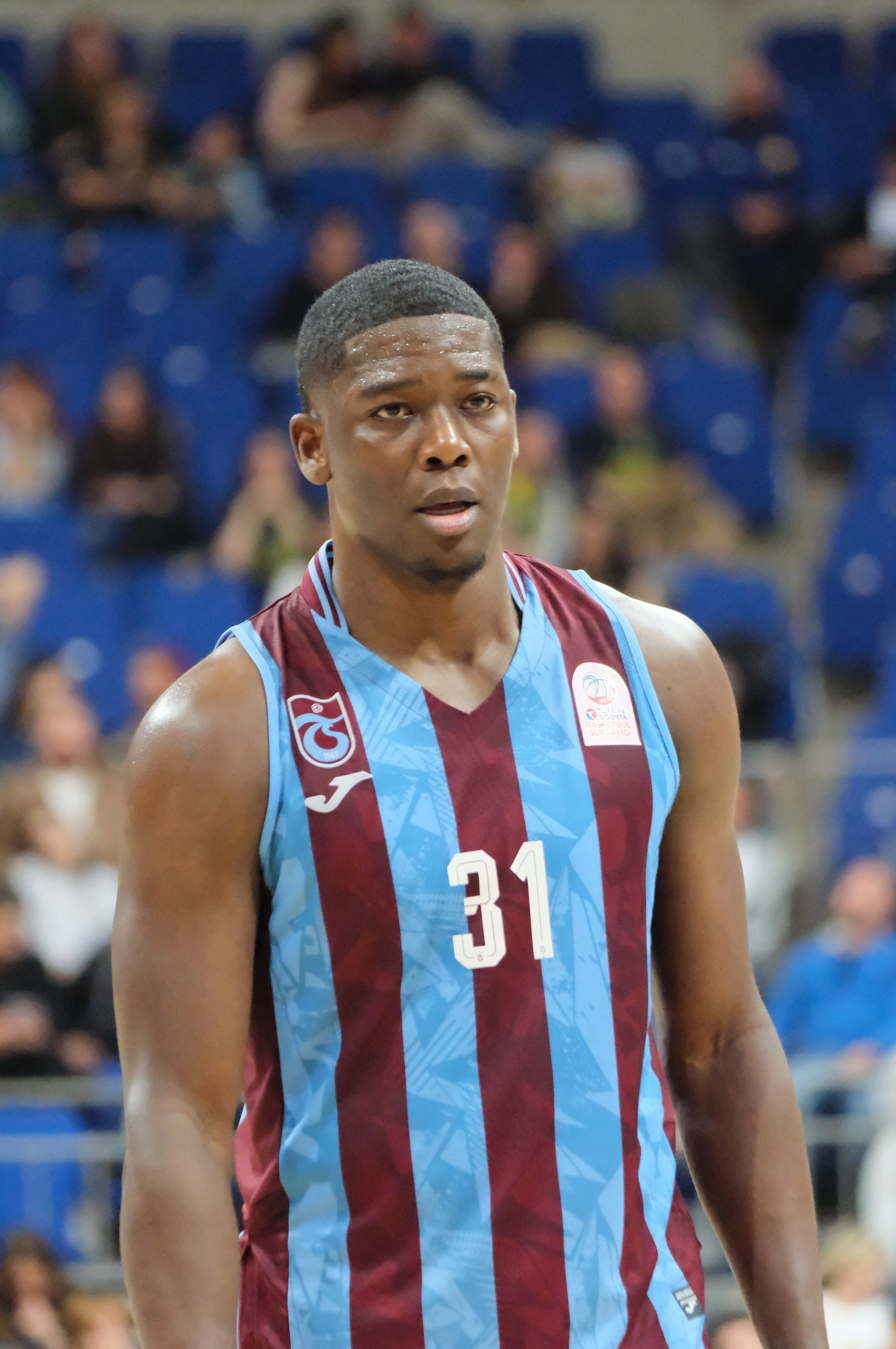
- Delgado with Trabzonspor in 2026

Free Agent
- Position: Center

Personal information
- Born: November 20, 1994 (age 31) Santo Domingo, Dominican Republic
- Listed height: 6 ft 9 in (2.06 m)
- Listed weight: 245 lb (111 kg)

Career information
- High school: The Patrick School (Elizabeth, New Jersey)
- College: Seton Hall (2014–2018)
- NBA draft: 2018: undrafted
- Playing career: 2018–present

Career history
- 2018–2019: Los Angeles Clippers
- 2018–2019: →Agua Caliente Clippers
- 2019–2020: Hapoel Holon
- 2020: Sioux Falls Skyforce
- 2020–2021: Estudiantes
- 2021–2022: Bilbao Basket
- 2022–2023: Pınar Karşıyaka
- 2023–2024: Beşiktaş
- 2024–2025: Galatasaray
- 2025–2026: Trabzonspor

Career highlights
- Liga ACB rebounding leader (2022); First-team All-NBA G League (2019); NBA G League Rookie of the Year (2019); 2× AP Honorable Mention All-American (2017, 2018); Kareem Abdul-Jabbar Award (2018); NCAA rebounding leader (2017); First-team All-Big East (2017); Second-team All-Big East (2018); Big East Rookie of the Year (2015); Big East All-Rookie Team (2015); Haggerty Award (2017); FIBA AmeriCup rebounding leader (2022)
- Stats at NBA.com
- Stats at Basketball Reference
Medals
Men's basketball
Representing Dominican Republic
Centrobasket
Bronze medal – third place	2016 Panama	National team

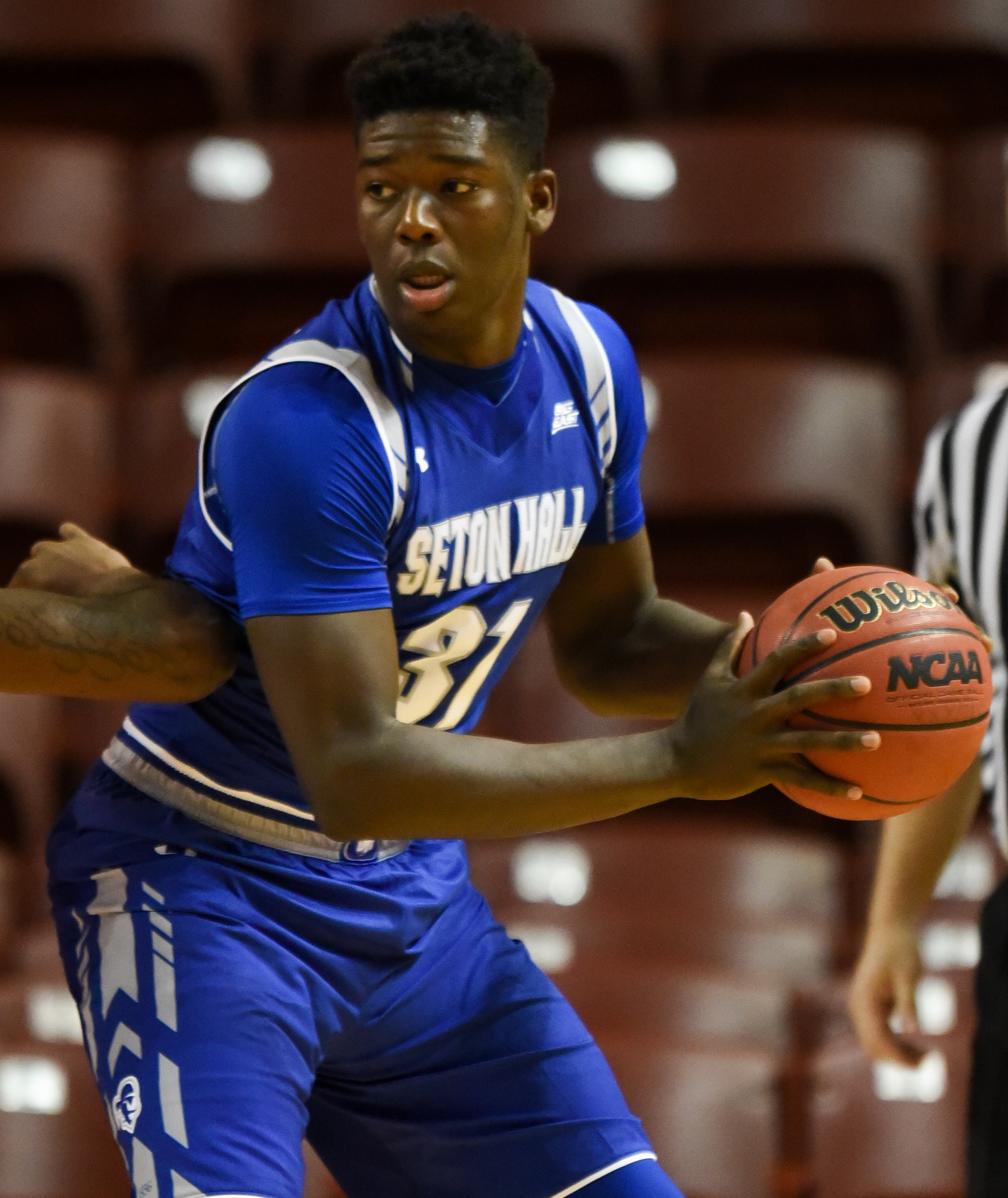
Delgado with the Seton Hall Pirates in 2015

Ángel Luis Delgado Astacio (born November 20, 1994) is a Dominican professional basketball player who last played for Trabzonspor of the Basketbol Süper Ligi (BSL). He played college basketball for the Seton Hall Pirates. Delgado has also played on the Dominican national team.

== College career ==
Delgado committed to play college basketball with the Pirates of Seton Hall University on August 16, 2013, after receiving offers from Florida State, Fordham, Virginia, among others. Delgado was elected Rookie of the Year of the Big East Conference in the 2014–15 season, after averaging 9.3 points and a conference-high 9.9 rebounds per game.

In his junior year at Seton Hall, Delgado lead the NCAA in rebounds with 13.1 rebounds per game that season to go along with 15.2 points per game. He was one assist shy of a triple double in the Big East Tournament matchup versus Marquette. He was named to the First Team All-Big East and led Seton Hall to a 21–12 overall mark and 10–8 record in the Big East. Delgado entered the 2017 NBA draft without an agent, although decided to return to Seton Hall for his senior year of college after not being invited to the NBA Combine.

Delgado broke Derrick Coleman's record for most rebounds in the Big East with a 19-rebound performance against DePaul on January 27, 2018. In his final game in college, an 83–79 loss to Kansas in the Round of 32 of the NCAA Tournament, he had 24 points and 23 rebounds. As a senior, Delgado averaged 13.6 points, 11.8 rebounds and 2.8 assists per game. He won the Kareem Abdul-Jabbar Award for top center and Haggerty Award for top New York-area player. In his career at Seton Hall he pulled down 1,432 rebounds. He participated in the 2018 Portsmouth Invitational Tournament.

== Professional career ==
=== Los Angeles Clippers (2018–2019) ===
After being undrafted in the 2018 NBA draft, Delgado signed a two-way contract with the Los Angeles Clippers on July 6, 2018. For the 2018–19 season, he split his playing time between the Clippers and their NBA G League affiliate, the Agua Caliente Clippers. On January 5, 2019, Delgado grabbed an NBA G League-record 31 rebounds for the Clippers in a 112–94 win over the Oklahoma City Blue. He broke a record previously set by Jack Cooley back in 2015 under the NBA D-League. Delgado made his NBA debut on February 7, recording 3 points, 4 rebounds, and 1 steal in 14 minutes of action in a blowout 116–92 loss to the Indiana Pacers.

On August 8, 2019, Delgado signed with the Beijing Royal Fighters of the Chinese Basketball Association. On October 16, 2019, he parted ways with the Royal Fighters before appearing in a game for them.

=== Hapoel Holon (2019–2020) ===
On December 2, 2019, Delgado signed with Hapoel Holon of the Israeli Premier League. He appeared in nine games for Holon in the Basketball Champions League and Israeli League, averaging 8.6 points and 5.7 rebounds in 17.3 minutes of action.

On January 14, 2020, Delgado parted ways with Holon for personal reasons.

=== Sioux Falls Skyforce (2020) ===
On March 6, 2020, the Sioux Falls Skyforce announced that they had acquired Delgado off waivers. In two games, he averaged 13.5 points, six rebounds, 1.5 assists and 1.5 steals per game.

=== Movistar Estudiantes (2020–2021) ===
On July 18, 2020, the Movistar Estudiantes announced that they had added Delgado.

=== Bilbao Basket (2021–2022) ===
On July 19, 2021, he has signed with Bilbao Basket of the Liga ACB.

=== Pınar Karşıyaka (2022–2023) ===
On June 23, 2022, he has signed with Pınar Karşıyaka of the Basketbol Süper Ligi.

=== Beşiktaş (2023–2024) ===
On July 6, 2023, he has signed with Beşiktaş of the Turkish Basketbol Süper Ligi.

=== Galatasaray (2024–2025) ===
On July 2, 2024, he signed with Galatasaray Ekmas of the Basketbol Süper Ligi (BSL).

On October 23, 2024, Delgado received Hoops Agents Player of the Week award for Round 3. He had a double-double of 14 points and 11 rebounds for his team to win.

On June 22, 2025, Galatasaray thanked the player and announced that they had parted ways.

=== Trabzonspor (2025–2026) ===
On July 8, 2025, he signed with Trabzonspor of the Basketbol Süper Ligi (BSL).

== National team career ==
Delgado represented the Dominican Republic at the 2016 Centrobasket, where he won a bronze medal. He averaged 12.5 points per game, 10th best in the tournament, and 7.5 rebounds per game, sixth best. Delgado later played in the 2017 FIBA AmeriCup, appearing in three games and, averaging 8.7 points and 8.3 rebounds in 23.5 minutes per game.

== Career statistics ==
Legend
GP	Games played	GS	Games started	MPG	Minutes per game
FG%	Field goal percentage	3P%	3-point field goal percentage	FT%	Free throw percentage
RPG	Rebounds per game	APG	Assists per game	SPG	Steals per game
BPG	Blocks per game	PPG	Points per game	**Bold**	Career high

=== Regular season ===
Year	Team	GP	GS	MPG	FG%	3P%	FT%	RPG	APG	SPG	BPG	PPG
2018–19	L.A. Clippers	2	0	7.5	.200	–	.500	2.0	.0	.5	.0	1.5
Career		2	0	7.5	.200	–	.500	2.0	.0	.5	.0	1.5

=== College ===
Year	Team	GP	GS	MPG	FG%	3P%	FT%	RPG	APG	SPG	BPG	PPG
2014–15	Seton Hall	31	29	28.2	.555	.000	.414	9.8	.9	.5	**1.3**	9.3
2015–16	Seton Hall	**34**	**34**	30.2	**.567**	.000	.536	9.3	1.0	.6	.8	9.9
2016–17	Seton Hall	33	33	**33.0**	.543	–	.556	**13.1**	2.2	.6	.3	**15.2**
2017–18	Seton Hall	**34**	**34**	30.9	.505	.000	**.612**	11.8	**2.8**	**.8**	.7	13.6
Career		132	130	30.6	.538	.000	.539	11.0	1.7	.6	.8	12.1
