= Jaime Echenique =

Colombian basketball player (born 1997)

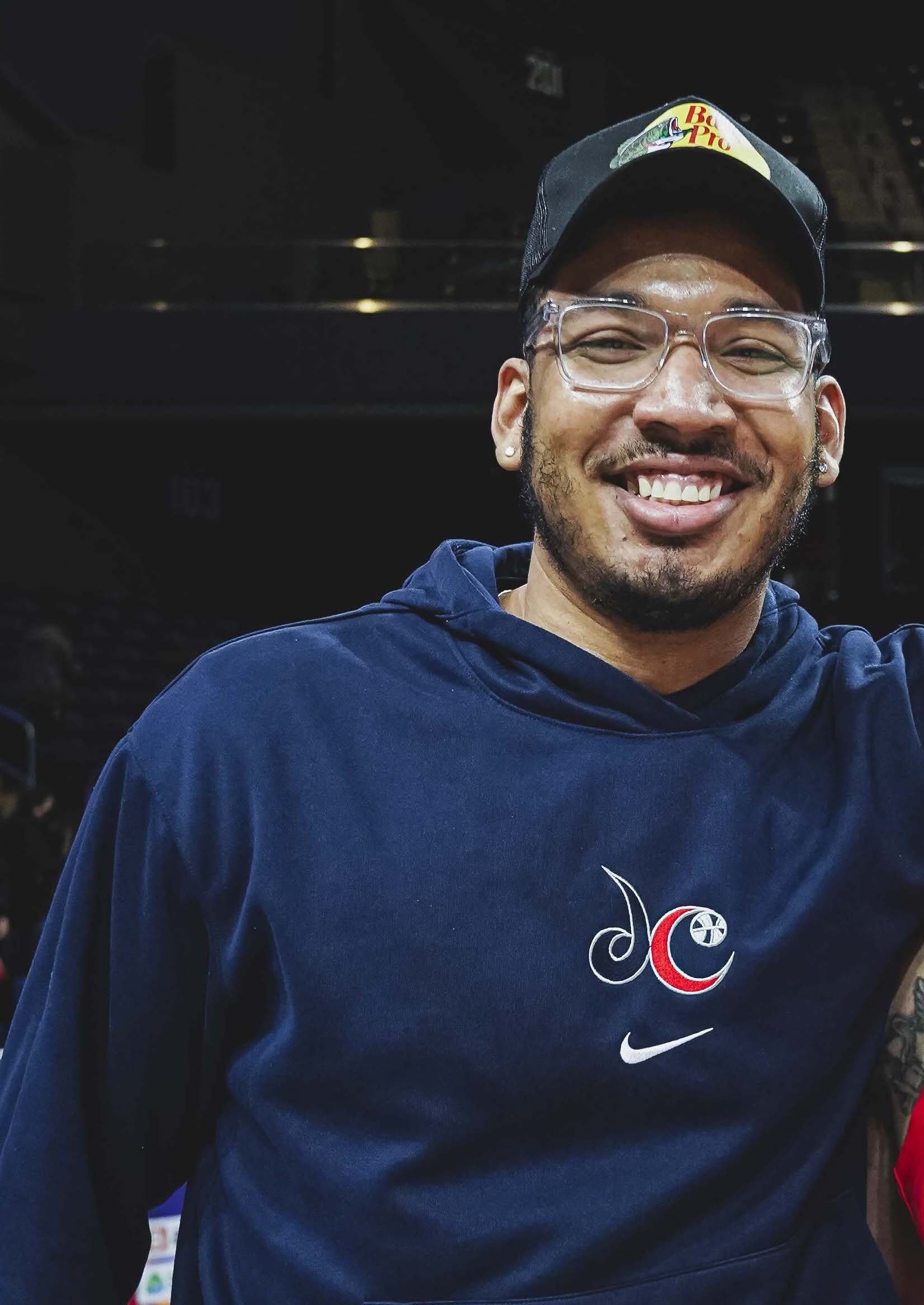
- Echenique at FIBA men's World Cup Qualifying game in 2022

No. 26 – Pallacanestro Reggiana
- Position: Center
- League: LBA

Personal information
- Born: April 27, 1997 (age 29) Barranquilla, Colombia
- Listed height: 6 ft 10 in (2.08 m)
- Listed weight: 258 lb (117 kg)

Career information
- High school: IED Pestalozzi (Barranquilla, Colombia)
- College: Trinity Valley CC (2016–2018); Wichita State (2018–2020)
- NBA draft: 2020: undrafted
- Playing career: 2020–present

Career history
- 2020–2021: Acunsa GBC
- 2021–2022: Capital City Go-Go
- 2021–2022: Washington Wizards
- 2022–2023: Motor City Cruise
- 2023: Rytas Vilnius
- 2023–2024: Promitheas Patras
- 2024–2025: Petkim Spor
- 2025–present: Reggio Emilia

Career highlights
- Second-team All-AAC (2020)
- Stats at NBA.com
- Stats at Basketball Reference

Jaime Jesús Echenique Salinas (born April 27, 1997) is a Colombian professional basketball player for Pallacanestro Reggiana of the Italian Lega Basket Serie A (LBA). He played college basketball for the Trinity Valley Community College Cardinals and the Wichita State Shockers.

== Early life ==
Echenique grew up in Barranquilla, Colombia and joined a street gang called the LBs which was headed by a cousin. Echenique gravitated towards basketball after playing baseball at a young age. He attended IED Pestalozzi and led its basketball team to four straight regional championships. As a junior and senior, Echenique was named region MVP. After graduating from high school in December 2015, he received several offers to play professionally in Europe, but his father forced him to turn them down to focus on academics. With the idea of playing college basketball in the United States, Echenique joined an amateur club in Medellín and, two months later, a club in Bogotá that had international connections and helped him acquire a visa for the United States. Guy Furr, the head coach of Trinity Valley Community College, was informed of Echenique's talent by two Colombians on the roster, and he invited Echenique to Texas to work out.

== College career ==
=== Trinity Valley CC ===
Echenique arrived in Dallas, Texas with no money and not speaking English fluently. He impressed coach Furr with his potential and received a scholarship from Trinity Valley Community College. During his freshman season, Echenique did not have much confidence and struggled with his conditioning, having never been pushed to exhaustion before. Nonetheless, he started 26 games as a freshman and averaged 9.2 points and 5.4 rebounds per game. As a sophomore, Echenique averaged 9.1 points and 6.1 rebounds per game. In his sophomore season, a friend invited him to visit Wichita State and he became fond of the city of Wichita, Kansas. Echenique committed to the Shockers over offers from Baylor, Cincinnati, Western Kentucky, Illinois, and New Mexico.

=== Wichita State ===
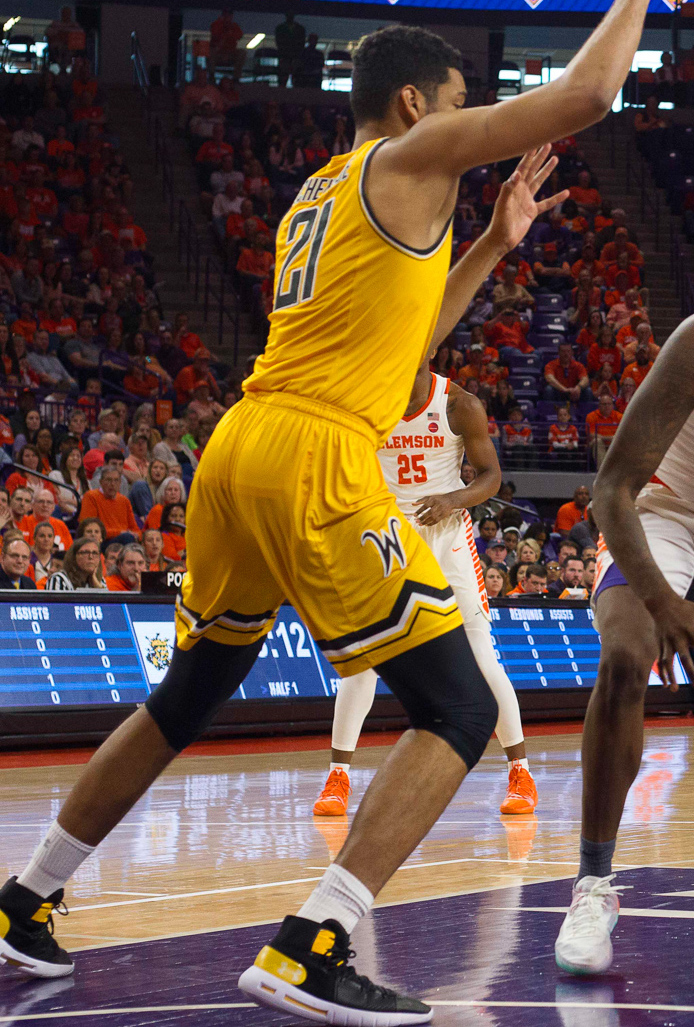
Echenique with Wichita State Shockers men's basketball in 2019

After Echenique arrived at Wichita State, he collapsed after a workout, prompting him so see a cardiologist to see if he had a heart condition. The examination proved that his heart was healthy, Echenique just needed to work through his conditioning. As a junior, he averaged 9.2 points, 6.0 rebounds, and 1.4 blocks per game. Echenique considered redshirting his senior season, an idea coach Gregg Marshall rejected. He missed several games in the beginning of the season with a fractured hand. He posted season highs of 20 points and 13 rebounds on January 15, 2020, in a 65–53 loss to Temple. On February 20, Echenique tied a career high of 20 points and had a career-best 12-of-14 shooting from the foul line, along with nine rebounds, four blocks and two steals in a 65–55 victory over South Florida. As a senior, Echenique averaged 11.3 points, 7.1 rebounds and 1.6 blocks per game. He earned Second Team All-AAC honors.

== Professional career ==
=== Acunsa GBC (2020–2021) ===
On August 11, 2020, Echenique signed his first professional contract with Acunsa GBC of the Spanish Liga ACB. He made his debut with the team on September 19, recording 10 points and four rebounds in an 86–70 loss to Real Madrid. He averaged 12 points and four rebounds per game.

=== Capital City Go-Go / Washington Wizards (2021–2022) ===
In August 2021, Echenique joined the Washington Wizards for the 2021 NBA Summer League and on September 21, he signed with the Wizards. Echenique was waived on October 16. In October 2021, he joined the Capital City Go-Go of the NBA G League as an affiliate player. Echenique averaged 12.6 points and 9.2 rebounds per game while shooting 55.4 percent from the floor. On December 30, 2021, he signed a 10-day contract with the Washington Wizards. On the same day, he made his NBA debut in a 110–93 win over the Cleveland Cavaliers, making him the first Colombian in NBA history. On January 9, 2022, Echenique was reacquired by the Capital City Go-Go.

=== Motor City Cruise (2022–2023) ===
On December 22, 2022, Echenique was traded from the Capital City Go-Go to the Motor City Cruise.

=== Rytas Vilnius (2023) ===
On April 14, 2023, Echenique signed with Rytas Vilnius of the Lithuanian Basketball League (LKL) for the remainder of the 2022–23 season.

=== Promitheas Patras (2023–2024) ===
On July 26, 2023, Echenique signed with Greek club Promitheas Patras.

=== Petkim Spor (2024–2025) ===
On July 16, 2024, Echenique signed with Petkim Spor of the Basketbol Süper Ligi.

=== Pallacanestro Reggiana (2025–present) ===
On August 16, 2025, Echenique signed with Pallacanestro Reggiana of the Italian Lega Basket Serie A (LBA).

== Career statistics ==
Legend
GP	Games played	GS	Games started	MPG	Minutes per game
FG%	Field goal percentage	3P%	3-point field goal percentage	FT%	Free throw percentage
RPG	Rebounds per game	APG	Assists per game	SPG	Steals per game
BPG	Blocks per game	PPG	Points per game	**Bold**	Career high

=== NBA ===
Year	Team	GP	GS	MPG	FG%	3P%	FT%	RPG	APG	SPG	BPG	PPG
2021–22	Washington	1	0	3.0	—	—	.500	.0	.0	.0	.0	.0
Career		1	0	3.0	—	—	.500	.0	.0	.0	.0	.0

=== College ===
==== NCAA Division I ====
Year	Team	GP	GS	MPG	FG%	3P%	FT%	RPG	APG	SPG	BPG	PPG
2018–19	Wichita State	**37**	**34**	17.9	**.543**	**.387**	.649	6.0	.4	.5	1.4	9.2
2019–20	Wichita State	27	24	23.4	.487	.190	**.784**	**7.1**	**.6**	**.7**	**1.6**	**11.3**
Career		64	58	20.2	.516	.308	.719	6.4	.4	.6	1.5	10.1

==== JUCO ====
Year	Team	GP	GS	MPG	FG%	3P%	FT%	RPG	APG	SPG	BPG	PPG
2016–17	Trinity Valley CC	31	**26**	—	**.613**	—	**.750**	5.4	**.2**	**.4**	1.2	**9.2**
2017–18	Trinity Valley CC	**33**	3	—	.575	**.500**	.697	**6.1**	**.2**	.2	**2.0**	9.1
Career		64	29	–	.593	.500	.721	5.8	.2	.3	1.6	9.1

== Personal life ==
Echenique is the son of Jaime Echenique Sr. and Lidis Salinas. His mother is a chef in an Arabian restaurant while his father is a bus driver.
