= 2025–26 Basketbol Süper Ligi =

Basketball league in Turkey

Basketbol Süper Ligi
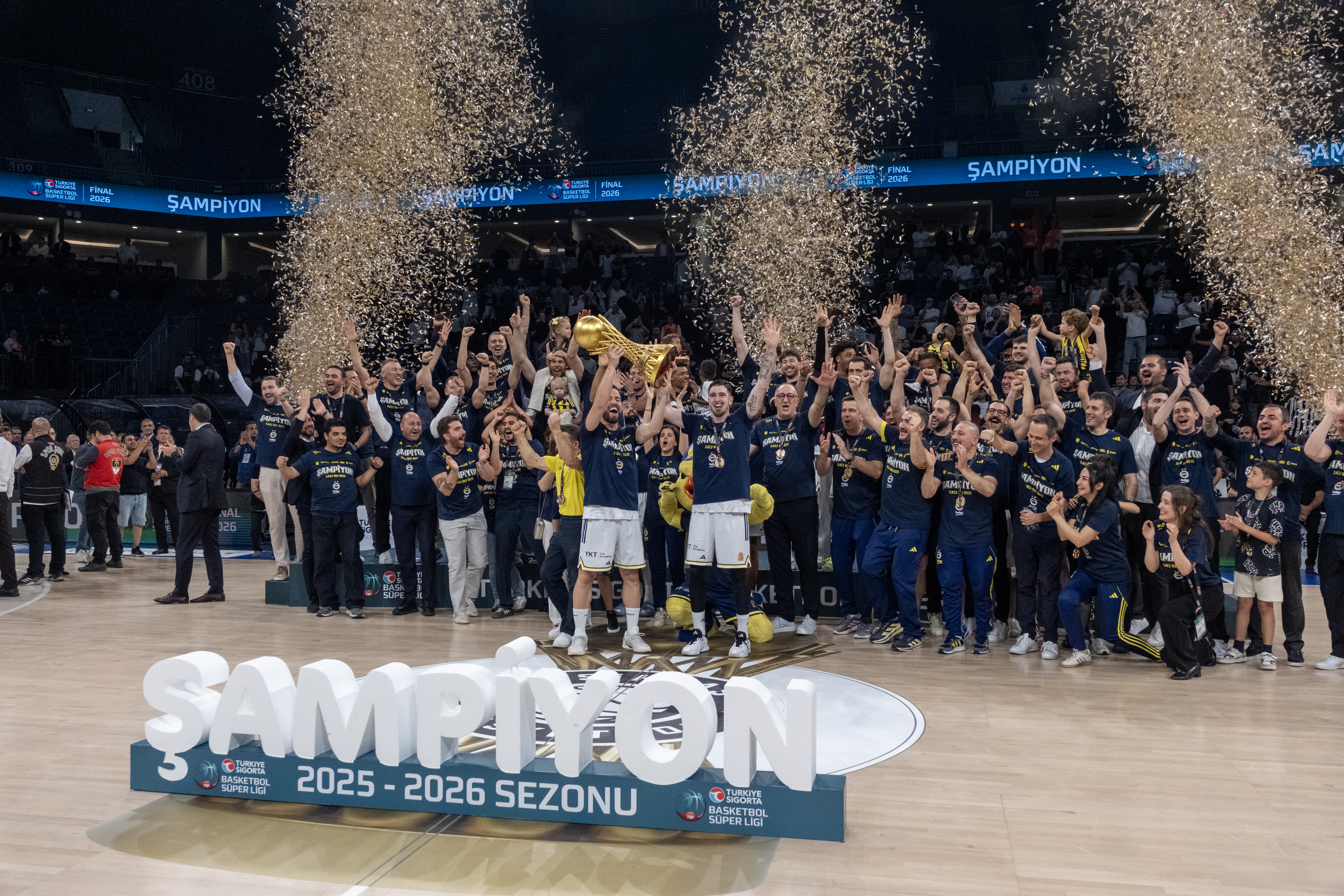
- Fenerbahçe Basketbol Süper Ligi championship ceremony
- Season: 2025–26
- Dates: 26 September 2025 – 19 June 2026
- Games played: 240 + Playoffs
- Teams: 16
- TV partner: beIN Sports

Regular season
- Season MVP: (United States) Marcquise Reed
- Relegated: ONVO Büyükçekmece; Mersin MSK

Finals
- Champions: Fenerbahçe (13th title)
- Runners-up: Beşiktaş Gain
- Finals MVP: (United States) Wade Baldwin IV

Statistical leaders
Points	(United States) Marcquise Reed	23.4
Rebounds	(United States) Trevion Williams	9.0
Assists	(Netherlands) Keye van der Vuurst	8.7
Index Rating	(United States) Marcquise Reed	23.9

Records
- Biggest home win: Türk Telekom 111–59 Karşıyaka Basket (8 November 2025)
- Biggest away win: Bursaspor Basketbol 77–105 Esenler Erokspor (3 January 2026)
- Highest scoring: Bursaspor Basketbol 113–115 Tofaş (15 March 2026)
- Winning streak: 13 games Beşiktaş Gain
- Losing streak: 9 games ONVO Büyükçekmece

The 2025–26 Basketbol Süper Ligi was the 60th season of the Basketball Super League (Turkish: Basketbol Süper Ligi), the top-level professional club men's basketball league in Turkey.

Two-times defending champions Fenerbahçe Beko retained their title again, to capture their 3rd consecutive and 13th overall title. Meanwhile, Beşiktaş Gain suffered their 2nd consecutive final defeat.

== Teams ==
On April 13, 2025, Trabzonspor was promoted to the BSL as the champion of the Turkish Basketball First League. They are back to top tier, after seven years break. Esenler Erokspor promoted to the BSL as winners of the TBL play-offs.

Darüşşafaka Lassa and Yalovaspor Basketbol were relegated after finishing in the last two spots for 2024–25 Basketbol Süper Ligi.

=== Venues ===
Locations of the 2025–26 Basketbol Süper Ligi clubs
Istanbul Basketbol Süper Ligi clubs

Team	Location	Stadium	Capacity
Anadolu Efes	Istanbul (Zeytinburnu)	Basketbol Gelişim Merkezi	10,000
Bahçeşehir Koleji	Istanbul (Bakırköy)	Sinan Erdem Spor Salonu	13,800
Beşiktaş Gain	Istanbul (Beşiktaş)	Akatlar Arena	3,200
Bursaspor Basketbol	Bursa	Tofaş Nilüfer Sports Hall	7,500
Esenler Erokspor	Istanbul (Esenler)	Sinan Erdem Spor Salonu	13,800
Fenerbahçe Beko	Istanbul (Ataşehir)	Ülker Sports Arena	13,800
Galatasaray MCT Technic	Istanbul (Zeytinburnu)	Basketbol Gelişim Merkezi	10,000
Glint Manisa Basket	Manisa	Muradiye Spor Salonu	3,500
Karşıyaka Basket	İzmir (Karşıyaka)	Karşıyaka Arena	5,000
Mersin MSK	Mersin	Servet Tazegül Spor Salonu	7,500
ONVO Büyükçekmece	Istanbul (Büyükçekmece)	Gazanfer Bilge Spor Salonu	3,000
Petkim Spor	İzmir (Aliağa)	Aliağa Belediyesi ENKA Spor Salonu	3,000
Tofaş	Bursa	Tofaş Nilüfer Sports Hall	7,500
Trabzonspor	Trabzon	Hayri Gür Arena	7,500
Türk Telekom	Ankara	Ankara Arena	10,400
Yukatel Merkezefendi Basket	Denizli	Pamukkale University Arena	3,490

=== Personnel and sponsorship ===
Team	Head coach	Captain	Kit manufacturer	Main shirt sponsor
Anadolu Efes	(Spain) Pablo Laso	(United States) Shane Larkin	GSA	Coca-Cola
Bahçeşehir Koleji	(Serbia) Marko Barać	(United States) Tyler Cavanaugh	Adidas	Bahçeşehir Koleji
Beşiktaş Gain	(Serbia) Dušan Alimpijević	(Turkey) Yiğit Arslan	Umbro	Gain
Bursaspor Basketbol	(Spain) Roger Grimau	(Turkey) Göksenin Köksal	Upon	Burtom Sağlık Grubu
Fenerbahçe Beko	(Lithuania) Šarūnas Jasikevičius	(Turkey) Melih Mahmutoğlu	Adidas	Beko
Galatasaray MCT Technic	(Italy) Gianmarco Pozzecco	(United States) Errick McCollum	Puma	MCT Technic
Glint Manisa Basket	(Turkey) Serhan Kavut	(United States) Scoochie Smith	Puma	N/A
Karşıyaka Basket	(Turkey) Ahmet Kandemir	(Turkey) Mert Celep	Hummel	Endo
Mersin MSK	(Spain) Carles Durán	(Mexico) Francisco Cruz	New Balance	N/A
ONVO Büyükçekmece	(Turkey) Halil Üner	(Turkey) Doğan Şenli	Jolt	Cob
Petkim Spor	(Turkey) Özhan Çıvgın	(Turkey) Yunus Emre Sonsırma	Playoff	N/A
Safiport Erokspor	(Turkey) Ufuk Sarıca	(United States) Jordon Crawford	Puma	N/A
Tofaş	(Turkey) Murat Hüseyin Yılmaz	(Turkey) Tolga Geçim	Head	Spoticar
Trabzonspor	(Turkey) Selçuk Ernak	(Turkey) İsmail Cem Ulusoy	Joma	N/A
Türk Telekom	(Turkey) Erdem Can	(Turkey) Doğuş Özdemiroğlu	Puma	Türk Telekom
Yukatel Merkezefendi Basket	(Turkey) Zafer Aktaş	(Germany) Mahir Agva	Geges	Yukatel

=== Head coaching changes ===
Team	Outgoing manager	Manner of departure	Date of vacancy	Position in table	Replaced with	Date of appointment
Petkim Spor	(Turkey) Burak Gören	Mutual consent	30 May 2025	Pre-season	(Turkey) Özhan Çıvgın	8 June 2025
Trabzonspor	(Turkey) Faruk Beşok	Mutual consent	3 June 2025	Pre-season	(Turkey) Selçuk Ernak	4 July 2025
ONVO Büyükçekmece	(Turkey) Özhan Çıvgın	Mutual consent	8 June 2025	Pre-season	(Turkey) Ozan Bulkaz	15 August 2025
Bahçeşehir Koleji	(Montenegro) Dejan Radonjić	Mutual consent	11 June 2025	Pre-season	(Serbia) Marko Barać	12 June 2025
Tofaş	(Turkey) Orhun Ene	Mutual consent	11 June 2025	Pre-season	(North Macedonia) Emil Rajković	26 June 2025
Esenler Erokspor	(Turkey) Ender Arslan	Mutual consent	12 June 2025	Pre-season	(Turkey) Ufuk Sarıca	9 July 2025
Anadolu Efes	(Italy) Luca Banchi	Mutual consent	15 June 2025	Pre-season	(Serbia) Igor Kokoškov	2 July 2025
Karşıyaka Basket	(Turkey) Ahmet Çakı	Mutual consent	8 July 2025	Pre-season	(Turkey) Faruk Beşok	31 July 2025
Manisa Basket	(Lithuania) Kazys Maksvytis	Mutual consent	10 July 2025	Pre-season	(Serbia) Oliver Kostić	4 August 2025
Bursaspor Basketbol	(Turkey) Serhan Kavut	Mutual consent	18 July 2025	Pre-season	(Bosnia and Herzegovina) Nenad Marković	18 July 2025
Karşıyaka Basket	(Turkey) Faruk Beşok	Mutual consent	8 November 2025	15th (1–6)	(Turkey) Candost Volkan	14 November 2025
Bursaspor Basketbol	(Bosnia and Herzegovina) Nenad Marković	Mutual consent	10 November 2025	12th (2–5)	(Turkey) Ahmet Çakı	11 November 2025
Anadolu Efes	(Serbia) Igor Kokoškov	Mutual consent	27 November 2025	4th (6–3)	(Spain) Pablo Laso	13 December 2025
Mersin MSK	(Turkey) Can Sevim	Mutual consent	19 December 2025	13th (3–8)	(Spain) Carles Durán	26 December 2025
Manisa Basket	(Serbia) Oliver Kostić	Mutual consent	26 December 2025	14th (3–9)	(Turkey) Serhan Kavut	26 December 2025
ONVO Büyükçekmece	(Turkey) Ozan Bulkaz	Mutual consent	26 December 2025	16th (1–11)	(Turkey) Faruk Beşok	26 December 2025
Galatasaray MCT Technic	(Turkey) Yakup Sekizkök	Mutual consent	30 December 2025	9th (7–6)	(Italy) Gianmarco Pozzecco	31 December 2025
Tofaş	(North Macedonia) Emil Rajković	Mutual consent	12 February 2026	10th (8–11)	(Turkey) Murat Hüseyin Yılmaz	24 February 2026
ONVO Büyükçekmece	(Turkey) Faruk Beşok	Mutual consent	22 February 2026	16th (2–18)	(Turkey) Halil Üner	4 March 2026
Bursaspor Basketbol	(Turkey) Ahmet Çakı	Mutual consent	12 March 2026	13th (6–15)	(Spain) Roger Grimau	26 March 2026
Karşıyaka Basket	(Turkey) Candost Volkan	Mutual consent	24 March 2026	15th (4–19)	(Turkey) Ahmet Kandemir	25 March 2026
Petkim Spor	(Turkey) Özhan Çıvgın	Mutual consent	30 March 2026	13th (7–17)	(Turkey) Orhun Ene	30 March 2026

== Regular season ==
=== League table ===
Pos	Team	Pld	W	L	PF	PA	PD	Pts	Qualification or relegation
1	Fenerbahçe Beko (C)	30	25	5	2644	2393	+251	55	Advance to playoffs
2	Beşiktaş Gain	30	25	5	2602	2304	+298	55	Advance to playoffs
3	Bahçeşehir Koleji	30	21	9	2495	2349	+146	51	Advance to playoffs
4	Anadolu Efes	30	20	10	2650	2446	+204	50	Advance to playoffs
5	Türk Telekom	30	20	10	2609	2436	+173	50	Advance to playoffs
6	Trabzonspor	30	19	11	2585	2459	+126	49	Advance to playoffs
7	Galatasaray MCT Technic	30	17	13	2577	2515	+62	47	Advance to playoffs
8	Safiport Erokspor	30	17	13	2439	2348	+91	47	Advance to playoffs
9	Yukatel Merkezefendi Basket	30	12	18	2449	2593	−144	42	
10	Tofaş	30	12	18	2518	2559	−41	42	
11	Glint Manisa Basket	30	11	19	2456	2579	−123	41	
12	Bursaspor Basketbol	30	10	20	2441	2651	−210	40	
13	Petkim Spor	30	9	21	2399	2614	−215	39	
14	Karşıyaka Basket	30	9	21	2408	2627	−219	39	
15	Mersin MSK (R)	30	9	21	2537	2650	−113	39	Relegation to TBL
16	ONVO Büyükçekmece (R)	30	4	26	2422	2708	−286	34	Relegation to TBL

Source: Basketbol Süper Ligi
(C) Champions; (R) Relegated

=== Positions by round ===
Team ╲ Round	1	2	3	4	5	6	7	8	9	10	11	12	13	14	15	16	17	18	19	20	21	22	23	24	25	26	27	28	29	30
Fenerbahçe Beko	9	5	4	4	3	3	3	2	2	2	2	2	2	2	1	1	1	1	1	1	1	1	1	1	1	1	1	1	2	1
Beşiktaş Gain	7	3	2	2	2	2	1	1	1	1	1	1	1	1	2	2	2	2	2	2	2	2	2	2	2	2	2	2	1	2
Bahçeşehir Koleji	6	4	3	3	4	4	4	3	3	3	3	3	3	3	3	3	3	3	3	3	3	3	3	3	3	3	3	3	3	3
Anadolu Efes	3	1	1	1	1	1	2	4	4	4	6	5	6	6	6	7	6	8	6	6	6	6	6	6	5	6	5	5	5	4
Türk Telekom	10	13	15	11	14	10	9	6	6	5	4	4	4	4	4	5	5	5	5	5	5	5	5	5	6	4	4	4	4	5
Trabzonspor	2	2	5	6	9	6	6	9	9	8	8	6	5	5	5	4	4	3	3	4	4	4	4	4	4	5	6	6	6	6
Galatasaray MCT Technic	11	10	7	9	6	7	8	5	5	6	5	7	9	9	9	8	8	6	8	7	7	8	8	7	7	7	7	7	7	7
Safiport Erokspor	14	14	9	12	7	5	5	7	8	9	9	8	8	7	7	6	7	7	7	8	8	7	7	8	8	8	8	8	8	8
Yukatel Merkezefendi Basket	5	7	11	8	10	13	13	12	10	12	11	12	13	10	11	10	10	9	9	11	11	11	11	9	9	9	9	9	9	9
Tofaş	8	9	6	5	5	8	7	8	7	7	7	9	7	8	8	9	9	10	10	9	9	9	9	10	10	10	10	10	10	10
Glint Manisa Basket	16	8	12	14	11	14	14	13	14	14	14	14	14	14	14	14	14	14	13	12	12	12	12	12	12	12	13	14	11	11
Bursaspor Basketbol	12	15	14	10	12	12	12	10	12	10	12	11	11	11	10	11	11	11	12	13	13	13	14	14	14	14	14	12	12	12
Petkim Spor	4	12	10	15	13	9	10	11	13	11	10	10	10	12	12	13	13	13	14	14	14	14	13	13	13	13	11	11	13	13
Karşıyaka Basket	13	11	13	13	15	15	15	15	15	16	15	15	16	15	15	15	15	15	15	15	15	15	15	15	15	15	15	15	15	14
Mersin MSK	1	6	8	7	8	11	11	14	11	13	13	13	12	13	13	12	12	12	11	10	10	10	10	11	11	11	12	13	14	15
ONVO Büyükçekmece	15	16	16	16	16	16	16	16	16	15	16	16	15	16	16	16	16	16	16	16	16	16	16	16	16	16	16	16	16	16

Leader
Advance to the playoffs
Relegated

Source: Basketbol Süper Ligi

=== Results ===
Home \ Away	AEF	BAH	BJK	BUR	FEN	GAL	MBB	KSK	MSK	BÇB	PET	ERO	TOF	TRA	TTA	MEB
Anadolu Efes	—	75–78	89–80	95–80	73–89	92–84	104–72	98–81	93–80	113–79	92–96	90–76	92–82	99–87	101–91	90–72
Bahçeşehir Koleji	85–76	—	88–95	100–61	86–96	93–86	112–105	74–88	72–69	81–58	100–60	65–83	78–76	91–77	82–73	85–67
Beşiktaş Gain	78–69	87–80	—	88–70	87–101	82–89	79–65	92–86	84–59	100–76	81–69	88–68	73–72	86–80	77–72	99–74
Bursaspor Basketbol	73–93	75–77	61–88	—	89–83	91–87	84–69	86–84	99–88	91–72	76–74	77–105	113–115	75–83	92–94	103–107
Fenerbahçe Beko	97–94	89–58	72–85	92–84	—	79–77	93–79	87–73	91–78	91–87	105–83	88–94	90–82	93–90	92–84	82–69
Galatasaray MCT Technic	80–87	82–72	89–73	92–70	76–85	—	87–91	103–83	85–79	98–94	90–61	88–76	93–91	89–101	90–93	98–89
Glint Manisa Basket	76–85	70–77	70–102	94–76	78–82	86–75	—	92–78	68–87	79–71	101–104	75–95	100–96	82–93	83–75	88–79
Karşıyaka Basket	87–101	71–74	73–86	84–82	55–91	72–82	69–80	—	92–87	96–87	103–91	68–67	107–101	69–85	75–85	76–69
Mersin MSK	86–88	87–80	86–99	84–86	78–87	114–76	81–77	92–87	—	87–94	104–103	83–88	84–80	79–82	82–96	110–92
ONVO Büyükçekmece	85–87	81–96	62–79	91–88	85–91	81–84	69–89	83–87	88–77	—	85–89	67–79	81–91	78–88	87–90	87–98
Petkim Spor	60–85	76–95	72–75	91–82	70–78	75–80	100–87	85–73	90–86	95–104	—	70–79	76–82	91–105	86–77	73–81
Safiport Erokspor	90–79	60–72	80–84	82–83	80–94	85–86	87–79	97–94	88–78	86–65	74–57	—	92–70	67–72	61–67	82–76
Tofaş	86–79	92–82	84–98	84–70	80–78	78–91	80–62	87–78	83–88	91–70	73–71	81–91	—	71–91	85–73	88–93
Trabzonspor	74–81	71–81	84–98	79–85	99–73	79–69	96–92	89–79	90–80	94–76	84–90	90–73	92–87	—	92–84	91–76
Türk Telekom	75–70	98–102	87–84	101–74	76–88	83–81	86–74	111–59	111–71	89–82	85–61	93–84	95–78	81–72	—	91–82
Yukatel Merkezefendi Basket	87–70	65–79	77–95	75–65	64–87	80–90	77–93	83–81	101–93	104–97	92–80	69–70	78–72	84–75	89–93	—

Source: Basketbol Süper Ligi
Legend: Blue = home team win; Red = away team win.
Matches with lighter background shading were decided after overtime.

== Playoffs ==
Quarterfinals was played best-of-three format (1–1–1), semifinals and finals will be played in a best-of-five format (2–2–1).

=== Bracket ===
Quarterfinals
1	Fenerbahçe Beko	2
8	Safiport Erokspor	0
4	Anadolu Efes	2
5	Türk Telekom	0
2	Beşiktaş Gain	2
7	Galatasaray MCT Technic	1
3	Bahçeşehir Koleji	2
6	Trabzonspor	0

Semifinals
1	Fenerbahçe Beko	3
4	Anadolu Efes	1
2	Beşiktaş Gain	3
3	Bahçeşehir Koleji	2

Finals
1	Fenerbahçe Beko	3
2	Beşiktaş Gain	1

=== Quarterfinals ===
Team 1	Series	Team 2	Game 1	Game 2	Game 3
Fenerbahçe Beko	2–0	Safiport Erokspor	94–72	96–73	—
Beşiktaş Gain	2–1	Galatasaray MCT Technic	108–83	75–78	71–68
Bahçeşehir Koleji	2–0	Trabzonspor	91–65	94–78	—
Anadolu Efes	2–0	Türk Telekom	86–75	77–70	—

=== Semifinals ===
Team 1	Series	Team 2	Game 1	Game 2	Game 3	Game 4	Game 5
Fenerbahçe Beko	3–1	Anadolu Efes	60–59	73–72	93–102	102–93 (OT)	—
Beşiktaş Gain	3–2	Bahçeşehir Koleji	82–79	79–101	95–98 (OT)	73–71	80–71

=== Finals ===
Team 1	Series	Team 2	Game 1	Game 2	Game 3	Game 4	Game 5
Fenerbahçe Beko	3–1	Beşiktaş Gain	80–88	93–68	82–71	77–75	—

== Statistical leaders ==
=== Efficiency ===
Pos	Player	Club	PIR
1	(United States) Marcquise Reed	Trabzonspor	23.93
2	(Lithuania) Marek Blaževič	Tofaş	18.64
3	(Belgium) Vrenz Bleijenbergh	Yukatel Merkezefendi	17.42
4	(United States) James Palmer	Galatasaray MCT Technic	16.90
5	(United States) Trevion Williams	Bahçeşehir Koleji	16.74

=== Points ===
Pos	Player	Club	PPG
1	(United States) Marcquise Reed	Trabzonspor	23.43
2	(United States) Cameron Young	Karşıyaka Basket	17.00
3	(United States) James Palmer	Galatasaray MCT Technic	16.72
4	(United States) Jalen Lecque	ONVO Büyükçekmece	15.71
5	(United States) Jordon Crawford	Safiport Erokspor	15.17

=== Rebounds ===
Pos	Player	Club	RPG
1	(United States) Trevion Williams	Bahçeşehir Koleji	9.00
2	(United Kingdom) Gabriel Olaseni	Mersin MSK	7.80
3	(United States) Jayce Johnson	Glint Manisa Basket	7.47
4	(Cameroon) Landry Nnoko	Bursaspor Basketbol	7.00
5	(Germany) Mahir Agva	Yukatel Merkezefendi	6.90

=== Assists ===
Pos	Player	Club	APG
1	(Netherlands) Keye van der Vuurst	ONVO Büyükçekmece	8.69
2	(United States) Brandon Childress	Bursaspor Basketbol	6.83
3	(United States) Anthony Cowan	Mersin MSK	6.79
4	(Mexico) Alex Pérez	Tofaş	6.43
5	(United States) Scoochie Smith	Glint Manisa Basket	6.13

Source: Basketbol Süper Ligi

== Awards ==
All official awards of the 2025–26 Basketbol Süper Ligi.

=== Season awards ===
Award	Player	Team	Ref.
Regular Season MVP	(United States) Marcquise Reed	Trabzonspor	
Finals MVP	(United States) Wade Baldwin IV	Fenerbahçe Beko	

=== MVP of the Month ===
Month	Player	Team	EFF	Ref.
2025
October	(Lithuania) Marek Blaževič	Tofaş	23.6	
November	(United States) Malachi Flynn	Bahçeşehir Koleji	22.6	
December	(United States) Marcquise Reed	Trabzonspor	35.2	
2026
January	(United States) Marcquise Reed	Trabzonspor	22.6	
February	(United States) Stanley Whittaker	Petkim Spor	29.0	
March	(The Bahamas) Kai Jones	Anadolu Efes	18.5	
April	(Croatia) Ante Žižić	Beşiktaş Gain	23.0	

=== MVP of the Round ===
Gameday	Player	Team	EFF	Ref.
1	(United States) Trevion Williams	Bahçeşehir Koleji	29	
2	(United States) Malachi Flynn	Bahçeşehir Koleji	36	
3	(Estonia) Artur Konontšuk	Bursaspor Basketbol	28	
4	(United States) Speedy Smith	Yukatel Merkezefendi Basket	26	
5	(Turkey) Şehmus Hazer	Anadolu Efes	28	
6	(United States) Malachi Flynn (x2)	Bahçeşehir Koleji	38	
7	(Canada) Kyle Alexander	Türk Telekom	27	
8	(Montenegro) Marko Simonović	Türk Telekom	28	
9	(United Kingdom) Gabriel Olaseni	Mersin MSK	31	
10	(United States) Marcquise Reed	Trabzonspor	39	
11	(United States) Marcquise Reed (x2)	Trabzonspor	37	
12	(United States) Marcquise Reed (x3)	Trabzonspor	34	
13	(Netherlands) Keye van der Vuurst	ONVO Büyükçekmece	32	
14	(Belgium) Vrenz Bleijenbergh	Yukatel Merkezefendi Basket	36	
15	(Lithuania) Marek Blaževič	Tofaş	30	
16	(United States) Marcquise Reed (x4)	Trabzonspor	28	
17	(Brazil) Mãozinha Pereira	Glint Manisa Basket	33	
18	(United Kingdom) Gabriel Olaseni (x2)	Mersin MSK	30	
19	(United States) Stanley Whittaker	Petkim Spor	33	
20	(Australia) Jack White	Mersin MSK	34	
21	(United States) Devon Dotson	Beşiktaş Gain	27	
22	(United States) Marcquise Reed (x5)	Trabzonspor	30	
23	(Turkey) Doğuş Özdemiroğlu	Türk Telekom	24	
24	(Belgium) Vrenz Bleijenbergh (x2)	Yukatel Merkezefendi Basket	27	
25	(Poland) Jordan Loyd	Anadolu Efes	27	
26	(Croatia) Ante Žižić	Beşiktaş Gain	29	
27	(United States) Charles Manning	Karşıyaka Basket	30	
28	(United States) Isaiah Miles	Yukatel Merkezefendi Basket	38	
29	(United States) Marcus Georges-Hunt	Bursaspor Basketbol	30	
30	(United States) Marcquise Reed (x6)	Trabzonspor	27	

=== Starting Five of the Round ===
Round	PG	SG	SF	PF	C	Ref.
1	(United States) David Efianayi (Petkim Spor)	(United States) Ronald March (Mersin MSK)	(France) Isaïa Cordinier (Anadolu Efes)	(Germany) Mahir Agva (Yukatel Merkezefendi Basket)	(United States) Trevion Williams (Bahçeşehir Koleji)	
2	(United States) Malachi Flynn (Bahçeşehir Koleji)	(United States) Talen Horton-Tucker (Fenerbahçe Beko)	(United States) James Palmer Jr. (Galatasaray MCT Technic)	(Turkey) Ercan Osmani (Anadolu Efes)	(France) Ismaël Kamagate (Beşiktaş Gain)	
3	(Turkey) Egehan Arna (Safiport Erokspor)	(France) Isaïa Cordinier (Anadolu Efes)	(Estonia) Artur Konontšuk (Bursaspor Basketbol)	(Turkey) Yiğitcan Saybir (Tofaş)	(Croatia) Ante Žižić (Beşiktaş Gain)	
4	(Turkey) Shane Larkin (Anadolu Efes)	(United States) Speedy Smith (Yukatel Merkezefendi Basket)	(Turkey) Doğuş Özdemiroğlu (Türk Telekom)	(Turkey) Tarik Biberović (Fenerbahçe Beko)	(Cameroon) Landry Nnoko (Bursaspor Basketbol)	
5	(United States) Jordon Crawford (Safiport Erokspor)	(Turkey) Şehmus Hazer (Anadolu Efes)	(United States) Scoochie Smith (Glint Manisa Basket)	(United States) James Palmer Jr. (Galatasaray MCT Technic)	(Lithuania) Marek Blaževič (Tofaş)	
6	(United States) Malachi Flynn (Bahçeşehir Koleji)	(Turkey) Şehmus Hazer (Anadolu Efes)	(United States) Jonah Mathews (Beşiktaş Gain)	(United Kingdom) Akwasi Yeboah (Trabzonspor)	(Lithuania) Martynas Sajus (Petkim Spor)	
7	(United States) Tony Taylor (Trabzonspor)	(United States) John Meeks (Galatasaray MCT Technic)	(United States) Wade Baldwin IV (Fenerbahçe Beko)	(United States) Trevion Williams (Bahçeşehir Koleji)	(Canada) Kyle Alexander (Türk Telekom)	
8	(United States) Judah Mintz (Glint Manisa Basket)	(United States) Malachi Flynn (Bahçeşehir Koleji)	(United States) Will Cummings (Galatasaray MCT Technic)	(Croatia) Ante Žižić (Beşiktaş Gain)	(Montenegro) Marko Simonović (Türk Telekom)	
9	(United States) Michael Devoe (Türk Telekom)	(Mexico) Alex Pérez (Tofaş)	(Turkey) Onuralp Bitim (Fenerbahçe Beko)	(United States) Trevion Williams (Bahçeşehir Koleji)	(United Kingdom) Gabriel Olaseni (Mersin MSK)	
10	(United States) Brandon Childress (Bursaspor Basketbol)	(United States) Marcquise Reed (Trabzonspor)	(Turkey) Doğuş Özdemiroğlu (Türk Telekom)	(United States) Jaron Johnson (ONVO Büyükçekmece)	(Croatia) Ante Žižić (Beşiktaş Gain)	
11	(United States) Marcquise Reed (Trabzonspor)	(United States) James Palmer Jr. (Galatasaray MCT Technic)	(Poland) Michał Sokołowski (Karşıyaka Basket)	(United States) Isaiah Whaley (Tofaş)	(France) Petr Cornelie (Safiport Erokspor)	
12	(United States) Jordon Crawford (Safiport Erokspor)	(United States) David Efianayi (Petkim Spor)	(United States) Marcquise Reed (Trabzonspor)	(Canada) Kyle Alexander (Türk Telekom)	(United States) Trevion Williams (Bahçeşehir Koleji)	
13	(Netherlands) Keye van der Vuurst (ONVO Büyükçekmece)	(United States) Marcquise Reed (Trabzonspor)	(Mexico) Alex Pérez (Tofaş)	(United States) Anthony Cowan Jr. (Mersin MSK)	(France) Petr Cornelie (Safiport Erokspor)	
14	(United States) Marcquise Reed (Trabzonspor)	(Turkey) Sarper David Mutaf (Anadolu Efes)	(United States) Talen Horton-Tucker (Fenerbahçe Beko)	(United States) Christian Bishop (Karşıyaka Basket)	(Belgium) Vrenz Bleijenbergh (Yukatel Merkezefendi Basket)	
15	(Poland) Jordan Loyd (Anadolu Efes)	(United States) Brandon Childress (Bursaspor Basketbol)	(United States) Tony Taylor (Trabzonspor)	(United States) Jerome Robinson (Galatasaray MCT Technic)	(Lithuania) Marek Blaževič (Tofaş)	
16	(United States) Marcquise Reed (Trabzonspor)	(United States) Charles Manning (Karşıyaka Basket)	(United States) James Palmer Jr. (Galatasaray MCT Technic)	(United States) Jeremy Simmons (Safiport Erokspor)	(Germany) Mahir Agva (Yukatel Merkezefendi Basket)	
17	(Turkey) Şehmus Hazer (Anadolu Efes)	(Croatia) Roko Badžim (Yukatel Merkezefendi Basket)	(Canada) Conor Morgan (Beşiktaş Gain)	(Brazil) Mãozinha Pereira (Glint Manisa Basket)	(United States) Freddie Gillespie (Galatasaray MCT Technic)	
18	(United States) Marcquise Reed (Trabzonspor)	(United States) Talen Horton-Tucker (Fenerbahçe Beko)	(United States) Jermaine Love (Safiport Erokspor)	(Canada) Kyle Alexander (Türk Telekom)	(United Kingdom) Gabriel Olaseni (Mersin MSK)	
19	(United States) Marcquise Reed (Trabzonspor)	(United States) Malachi Flynn (Bahçeşehir Koleji)	(Turkey) Şehmus Hazer (Anadolu Efes)	(United States) Stanley Whittaker (Petkim Spor)	(Brazil) Mãozinha Pereira (Glint Manisa Basket)	
20	(Mexico) Alex Pérez (Tofaş)	(United States) Brandon Boston Jr. (Fenerbahçe Beko)	(Australia) Jack White (Mersin MSK)	(Turkey) Yiğit Onan (Glint Manisa Basket)	(France) Ismaël Kamagate (Beşiktaş Gain)	
21	(United States) Devon Dotson (Beşiktaş Gain)	(United States) Marcquise Reed (Trabzonspor)	(United States) Langston Galloway (Safiport Erokspor)	(Turkey) Metecan Birsen (Fenerbahçe Beko)	(United States) Trevion Williams (Bahçeşehir Koleji)	
22	(Turkey) Kartal Özmızrak (Mersin MSK)	(United States) Marcquise Reed (Trabzonspor)	(Turkey) Egehan Arna (Safiport Erokspor)	(The Bahamas) Kai Jones (Anadolu Efes)	(Lithuania) Marek Blaževič (Tofaş)	
23	(Turkey) Doğuş Özdemiroğlu (Türk Telekom)	(United States) Jonah Mathews (Beşiktaş Gain)	(United States) Fabian White (Galatasaray MCT Technic)	(United States) Tyler Cavanaugh (Bahçeşehir Koleji)	(Slovenia) Alen Omić (Yukatel Merkezefendi Basket)	
24	(United States) Mike Smith (Bursaspor Basketbol)	(United States) Jordan Usher (Türk Telekom)	(United States) Caleb Homesley (Bahçeşehir Koleji)	(Belgium) Vrenz Bleijenbergh (Yukatel Merkezefendi Basket)	(Turkey) Mert Celep (Karşıyaka Basket)	
25	(Poland) Jordan Loyd (Anadolu Efes)	(United States) Talen Horton-Tucker (Fenerbahçe Beko)	(United States) Anthony Brown (Beşiktaş Gain)	(United States) Tyler Cavanaugh (Bahçeşehir Koleji)	(Dominican Republic) Ángel Delgado (Trabzonspor)	
26	(Turkey) Doğuş Özdemiroğlu (Türk Telekom)	(United States) David Efianayi (Petkim Spor)	(Poland) Michał Sokołowski (Karşıyaka Basket)	(United States) Jayce Johnson (Glint Manisa Basket)	(Croatia) Ante Žižić (Beşiktaş Gain)	
27	(Poland) Jordan Loyd (Anadolu Efes)	(United States) V. J. King (Bursaspor Basketbol)	(United States) Charles Manning (Karşıyaka Basket)	(United States) David Efianayi (Petkim Spor)	(Croatia) Ante Žižić (Beşiktaş Gain)	
28	(United States) Brandon Childress (Bursaspor Basketbol)	(United States) Marcquise Reed (Trabzonspor)	(United States) Isaiah Miles (Yukatel Merkezefendi Basket)	(Italy) Nicolò Melli (Fenerbahçe Beko)	(France) Vincent Poirier (Anadolu Efes)	
29	(United States) Scoochie Smith (Glint Manisa Basket)	(Croatia) Roko Badžim (Yukatel Merkezefendi Basket)	(France) Hugo Besson (Tofaş)	(United States) Marcus Georges-Hunt (Bursaspor Basketbol)	(France) Vincent Poirier (Anadolu Efes)	
30	(Mexico) Alex Pérez (Tofaş)	(United States) Marcquise Reed (Trabzonspor)	(United States) Charles Manning (Karşıyaka Basket)	(United States) James Palmer Jr. (Galatasaray MCT Technic)	(The Bahamas) Kai Jones (Anadolu Efes)	

== Turkish clubs in European competitions ==
Team	Competition	Progress
Anadolu Efes	EuroLeague	Regular Season
Fenerbahçe Beko	EuroLeague	Semifinals
Bahçeşehir Koleji	EuroCup	Semifinals
Beşiktaş Gain	EuroCup	Runners-up
Türk Telekom	EuroCup	Semifinals
Galatasaray MCT Technic	Champions League	Playoffs
Mersin MSK	Champions League	Play-ins
Tofaş	Champions League	Round of 16
Bursaspor Basketbol	Champions League	Regular Season
Petkim Spor	FIBA Europe Cup	Quarterfinals
