= 2020–21 Basketbol Süper Ligi =

Basketball league in Turkey

Basketbol Süper Ligi
- Season: 2020–21
- Dates: 26 September 2020 – 7 June 2021
- Games played: 259
- Teams: 16
- TV partner: Tivibu

Regular season
- Season MVP: (Turkey) Alperen Şengün
- Relegated: OGM Ormanspor; Lokman Hekim Fethiye Belediyespor

Finals
- Champions: Anadolu Efes (15th title)
- Runners-up: Fenerbahçe Beko
- Semifinalists: Beşiktaş Icrypex; Pınar Karşıyaka
- Finals MVP: (France) Rodrigue Beaubois

Statistical leaders
Points	(Mexico) Paco Cruz	19.6
Rebounds	(France) Mouhammadou Jaiteh	11.0
Assists	(United States) Chris Wright	8.3
Index Rating	(Turkey) Alperen Şengün	26.8

Records
- Biggest home win: Fenerbahçe Beko 117–59 Pınar Karşıyaka (4 April 2021)
- Biggest away win: OGM Ormanspor 61–101 Pınar Karşıyaka (30 April 2021)
- Highest scoring: Frutti Extra Bursaspor 107–108 Türk Telekom (7 November 2020)
- Winning streak: 22 games Anadolu Efes
- Losing streak: 8 games Frutti Extra Bursaspor

The 2020–21 Basketbol Süper Ligi was the 55th season of the Basketbol Süper Ligi, the top-tier level professional club basketball league in Turkey.

The season is the first to be played after the previous season was abandoned due to the COVID-19 pandemic. The previous season was cancelled in May 2020.

== Teams ==
On May 11, 2020, it was declared the previous season was cancelled by Turkish Basketball Federation. Since this season was cancelled, there was no promotion and relegation.

On July 29, 2020, it was announced Sigortam.Net İTÜ (Team has been renamed to Bakırköy Basket after end of last season) has been removed from league by TBF due to financial issues. Instead of them, Petkim Spor will play in the league. On August 21, 2020 Teksüt Bandırma announced that they withdrew from league due to financial issues. Later on the same day TBF has announced that 2020–21 season will be played with 15 teams. On September 4, 2020, Arbitration Board of Sports decided, application of Merkezefendi Belediyesi Denizli Basket is valid and they could be the 16th team of BSL.

On September 18, TBF announced Fethiye Belediyespor would be the 16th team.

=== Venues ===
Locations of the 2020–21 Basketbol Süper Ligi clubs
Istanbul Basketbol Süper Ligi clubs

Team	Home city	Stadium	Capacity
Anadolu Efes	Istanbul	Sinan Erdem Dome	16,000
Bahçeşehir Koleji	Istanbul	Akatlar Arena	3,200
Beşiktaş Icrypex	Istanbul	Akatlar Arena	3,200
Büyükçekmece Basketbol	Istanbul	Gazanfer Bilge Spor Salonu	3,000
Darüşşafaka Tekfen	Istanbul	Volkswagen Arena Istanbul	5,000
Empera Halı Gaziantep Basketbol	Gaziantep	Karataş Şahinbey Sport Hall	6,400
Fenerbahçe Beko	Istanbul	Ülker Sports Arena	13,800
Frutti Extra Bursaspor	Bursa	Tofaş Nilüfer Sports Hall	7,500
Galatasaray	Istanbul	Sinan Erdem Dome	16,000
HDI Sigorta Afyon Belediye	Afyonkarahisar	Prof. Dr. Veysel Eroğlu Spor Salonu	2,800
Lokman Hekim Fethiye Belediyespor	Fethiye, Muğla	Eldirek Spor Salonu	2,000
OGM Ormanspor	Ankara	Ankara Arena	10,400
Petkim Spor	İzmir	Aliağa Belediyesi ENKA Spor Salonu	3,000
Pınar Karşıyaka	İzmir	Karşıyaka Arena	5,000
Tofaş	Bursa	Tofaş Nilüfer Sports Hall	7,500
Türk Telekom	Ankara	Ankara Arena	10,400

=== Personnel and sponsorship ===
Team	Head coach	Captain	Kit manufacturer	Main shirt sponsor
Anadolu Efes	(Turkey) Ergin Ataman	(Turkey) Doğuş Balbay	Bilcee	Anadolu Efes
Bahçeşehir Koleji	(Turkey) Erhan Ernak	(Turkey) Deniz Kılıçlı	Playoff	Bahçeşehir Koleji
Beşiktaş Icrypex	(Turkey) Ahmet Kandemir	(Turkey) Mehmet Yağmur	Macron	Sompo Japan Sigorta
Büyükçekmece Basketbol	(Turkey) Özhan Çıvgın	(United States) Osiris Eldridge	Dafron	N/A
Darüşşafaka Tekfen	(Turkey) Selçuk Ernak	(Turkey) Erkan Veyseloğlu	Dafron	Tekfen
Empera Halı Gaziantep Basketbol	(Bosnia and Herzegovina) Nenad Marković	(Turkey) Can Uğur Öğüt	Dafron	Empera Halı
Fenerbahçe Beko	(Serbia) Igor Kokoškov	(Turkey) Melih Mahmutoğlu	Nike	Beko
Frutti Extra Bursaspor	(Serbia) Dušan Alimpijević	(Turkey) Ender Arslan	Kappa	Uludağ Frutti Extra
Galatasaray	(Turkey) Ekrem Memnun	(Turkey) Göksenin Köksal	Givova	Doğa Sigorta
HDI Sigorta Afyon Belediye	(Turkey) Can Sevim	(Turkey) Sinan Sağlam	Barex	HDI Sigorta
Lokman Hekim Fethiye Belediyespor	(Turkey) Alkım Ay	(Turkey) Barış Hersek	Barex	Esnaf Hastanesi
OGM Ormanspor	(Turkey) Korhan Aydanarığ	(Turkey) Cevher Özer	Wanisax	N/A
Petkim Spor	(Lithuania) Kęstutis Kemzūra	(Turkey) Yiğitcan Turna	Barex	Petkim
Pınar Karşıyaka	(Turkey) Ufuk Sarıca	(Turkey) Semih Erden	S by Sportive	Pınar
Tofaş	(Turkey) Hakan Demir	(United States) D. J. White	Dafron	Fiat
Türk Telekom	(Turkey) Burak Gören	(Turkey) Muhammed Baygül	Dafron	Türk Telekom

=== Head coaching changes ===
Team	Outgoing manager	Manner of departure	Date of vacancy	Position in table	Replaced with	Date of appointment
Frutti Extra Bursaspor	(Turkey) Serkan Erdoğan	Mutual consent	12 June 2020	Pre-season	(Turkey) Tutku Açık	9 August 2020
Fenerbahçe Beko	(Serbia) Željko Obradović	Mutual consent	23 June 2020	Pre-season	(Serbia) Igor Kokoškov	2 July 2020
Tofaş	(Turkey) Orhun Ene	Mutual consent	26 October 2020	8th (2–3)	(Turkey) Hakan Demir	29 October 2020
Beşiktaş Icrypex	(Turkey) Burak Bıyıktay	Mutual consent	8 November 2020	16th (0–6)	(Turkey) Ahmet Kandemir	8 November 2020
Galatasaray	(Turkey) Ertuğrul Erdoğan	Mutual consent	10 November 2020	15th (2–5)	(Turkey) Ömer Uğurata	3 December 2020
Frutti Extra Bursaspor	(Turkey) Tutku Açık	Mutual consent	23 November 2020	11th (3–5)	(Serbia) Dušan Alimpijević	24 November 2020
Bahçeşehir Koleji	(Turkey) Zafer Aktaş	Mutual consent	8 December 2020	9th (4–7)	(Turkey) Erhan Ernak	8 December 2020
Galatasaray	(Turkey) Ömer Uğurata	Mutual consent	12 January 2021	15th (5–11)	(Turkey) Ekrem Memnun	14 January 2021

== Regular season ==
=== League table ===
Pos	Team	Pld	W	L	PF	PA	PD	Pts	Qualification or relegation
1	Anadolu Efes	30	29	1	2664	2267	+397	59	Advance to playoffs
2	Fenerbahçe Beko	30	22	8	2627	2291	+336	52	Advance to playoffs
3	Pınar Karşıyaka (Note: Pınar Karşıyaka have been deducted 1 point.)	30	21	9	2527	2320	+207	50	Advance to playoffs
4	Tofaş	30	19	11	2597	2444	+153	49	Advance to playoffs
5	Beşiktaş Icrypex (Note: Beşiktaş have been deducted 1 point.)	30	19	11	2567	2435	+132	48	Advance to playoffs
6	Türk Telekom	30	17	13	2493	2458	+35	47	Advance to playoffs
7	Darüşşafaka Tekfen	30	16	14	2481	2392	+89	46	Advance to playoffs
8	Gaziantep Basketbol	30	15	15	2272	2266	+6	45	Advance to playoffs
9	Frutti Extra Bursaspor	30	13	17	2403	2525	−122	43	
10	HDI Sigorta Afyon Belediye	30	12	18	2455	2633	−178	42	
11	Petkim Spor	30	10	20	2383	2451	−68	40	
12	Bahçeşehir Koleji	30	10	20	2431	2471	−40	40	
13	Arel Üniversitesi Büyükçekmece	30	10	20	2408	2613	−205	40	
14	Galatasaray (Note: Galatasaray have been deducted 1 point.)	30	11	19	2505	2613	−108	40	
15	Lokman Hekim Fethiye Belediyespor	30	9	21	2305	2613	−308	39	Relegation to TBL
16	OGM Ormanspor	30	7	23	2350	2676	−326	37	Relegation to TBL

Source: Basketbol Süper Ligi

=== Positions by round ===
Team ╲ Round	1	2	3	4	5	6	7	8	9	10	11	12	13	14	15	16	17	18	19	20	21	22	23	24	25	26	27	28	29	30
Anadolu Efes	2	3	2	1	2	1	1	1	2	2	2	2	2	2	2	1	1	1	1	1	1	1	1	1	1	1	1	1	1	1
Fenerbahçe Beko	1	1	1	2	1	2	2	2	1	1	1	1	1	1	1	2	3	3	3	3	3	3	3	3	3	2	2	2	2	2
Pınar Karşıyaka	7	10	10	4	4	4	10	12	10	11	4	4	3	3	3	3	2	2	2	2	2	2	2	2	2	3	3	3	3	3
Tofaş	10	7	5	5	8	12	6	5	6	4	5	7	10	8	6	6	6	7	6	5	4	4	4	4	4	4	4	5	4	4
Beşiktaş Icrypex	15	16	16	16	16	16	16	16	15	13	11	9	8	6	7	9	7	6	7	9	9	6	6	7	6	6	7	9	7	5
Türk Telekom	13	6	4	3	3	3	3	3	3	3	3	3	4	4	4	4	4	4	4	4	5	5	5	5	5	5	6	4	5	6
Darüşşafaka Tekfen	14	12	12	11	12	11	12	8	5	7	6	5	6	9	11	11	9	8	9	7	7	8	8	6	7	7	5	6	6	7
Empera Halı Gaziantep Basketbol	9	8	6	6	6	7	8	11	14	15	13	14	7	7	8	7	10	9	8	8	8	9	9	9	8	8	8	7	8	8
Frutti Extra Bursaspor	3	2	3	8	7	6	7	9	11	12	14	16	16	16	16	16	14	12	10	12	12	13	12	11	10	10	10	8	9	9
HDI Sigorta Afyon Belediye	5	5	9	10	9	8	4	6	7	6	8	6	5	5	5	5	5	5	5	6	6	7	7	8	9	9	9	10	11	10
Petkim Spor	8	11	13	12	13	10	5	4	4	5	7	8	13	14	15	14	16	16	14	11	11	10	10	10	11	13	13	15	14	11
Bahçeşehir Koleji	4	4	7	9	5	5	11	7	8	8	9	10	9	10	9	10	11	11	13	10	10	11	11	12	12	11	14	12	13	12
Büyükçekmece Basketbol	6	9	8	7	10	13	13	13	16	16	15	12	11	11	10	8	8	10	11	13	13	12	13	13	13	12	11	13	10	13
Galatasaray	16	13	11	13	14	15	15	14	12	9	12	13	14	12	13	15	12	13	12	14	14	14	14	14	14	14	12	11	12	14
Lokman Hekim Fethiye Belediyespor	12	15	15	15	15	14	14	15	13	14	16	15	15	15	14	13	15	15	16	16	16	16	16	15	16	16	15	14	15	15
OGM Ormanspor	11	14	14	14	11	9	9	10	9	10	10	11	12	13	12	12	13	14	15	15	15	15	15	16	15	15	16	16	16	16

Leader
Advance to the playoffs
Relegated

Source: Basketbol Süper Ligi

=== Results ===
Home \ Away	AEF	BAH	BJK	BÇB	DSK	GAZ	FEN	BUR	GAL	AFY	FET	ORM	PET	KSK	TOF	TTA
Anadolu Efes	—	89–66	84–80	98–79	84–74	102–63	85–72	91–58	90–80	86–67	101–85	95–75	87–80	74–61	87–85	83–78
Bahçeşehir Koleji	76–100	—	76–86	83–74	76–85	76–83	61–78	101–71	78–95	70–76	99–71	92–65	85–91	83–96	84–73	88–97
Beşiktaş Icrypex	74–81	83–77	—	84–77	98–93	84–81	74–83	69–84	82–64	104–75	76–65	85–91	96–94	72–84	94–85	94–60
Büyükçekmece Basketbol	83–94	66–92	89–104	—	88–85	71–90	93–91	68–73	105–101	95–83	66–59	89–82	86–83	77–90	75–88	75–86
Darüşşafaka Tekfen	70–81	91–95	82–86	85–82	—	82–75	64–66	78–75	91–82	102–77	96–81	90–68	99–78	86–77	72–85	84–72
Empera Halı Gaziantep Basketbol	60–68	88–77	77–84	65–66	76–82	—	59–65	77–70	68–61	84–88	84–64	76–87	76–64	59–55	68–67	70–66
Fenerbahçe Beko	84–88	70–56	83–92	81–70	90–79	97–102	—	90–54	104–79	94–74	113–74	105–72	93–70	117–59	81–84	99–77
Frutti Extra Bursaspor	76–95	67–64	89–73	89–81	68–70	78–90	82–77	—	73–92	81–75	89–84	104–89	95–89	81–94	83–70	107–108
Galatasaray	56–80	101–90	97–89	87–91	87–98	86–90	73–87	106–93	—	110–70	71–68	89–87	65–89	74–86	79–91	94–89
HDI Sigorta Afyon Belediye	103–85	77–89	73–96	79–74	80–79	78–70	87–97	76–70	97–80	—	83–93	91–114	94–76	69–75	75–89	84–89
Lokman Hekim Fethiye Belediyespor	84–90	76–105	87–83	83–70	54–78	60–90	86–93	75–89	91–82	100–89	—	98–89	75–74	78–86	76–101	82–81
OGM Ormanspor	76–115	80–68	68–92	74–85	64–80	81–82	63–72	84–80	82–90	85–101	77–66	—	90–106	61–101	77–76	90–97
Petkim Spor	71–75	72–77	82–72	98–77	78–70	67–66	67–80	108–80	83–64	78–81	69–79	83–76	—	75–85	62–83	65–71
Pınar Karşıyaka	89–98	82–79	80–81	117–82	89–78	72–65	83–79	84–85	92–94	96–82	92–55	86–57	97–80	—	90–71	80–69
Tofaş	78–92	87–80	89–86	94–85	101–89	84–72	103–104	84–77	98–89	83–85	110–81	99–82	88–80	78–88	—	78–64
Türk Telekom	84–86	101–88	85–94	95–89	79–69	84–66	81–82	83–82	81–77	89–86	87–75	83–64	89–71	81–61	87–95	—

Source: bsl.org
Legend: Blue = home team win; Red = away team win.
Matches with lighter background shading were decided after overtime.

== Playoffs ==
In the quarter-finals a best-of-three was played, in the semi-finals a best-of-five and in the finals a best-of-seven playoff format was used.

Quarterfinals were played best-of-three format (1-1-1), semifinals and finals were played in a best-of-five format (2-2-1).

=== Bracket ===
Quarterfinals
1	Anadolu Efes	2
8	Gaziantep Basketbol	0
4	Tofaş	0
5	Beşiktaş Icrypex	2
2	Fenerbahçe Beko	2
7	Darüşşafaka Tekfen	0
3	Pınar Karşıyaka	2
6	Türk Telekom	1

Semifinals
1	Anadolu Efes	3
5	Beşiktaş Icrypex	0
2	Fenerbahçe Beko	3
3	Pınar Karşıyaka	1

Finals
1	Anadolu Efes	3
2	Fenerbahçe Beko	0

=== Quarterfinals ===
Team 1	Series	Team 2	Game 1	Game 2	Game 3
Anadolu Efes	2–0	Gaziantep Basketbol	96–73	83–67	–
Fenerbahçe Beko	2–0	Darüşşafaka Tekfen	103–91	98–79	–
Pınar Karşıyaka	2–1	Türk Telekom	82–79	70–76	96–71
Tofaş	0–2	Beşiktaş Icrypex	90–92	79–82	–

=== Semifinals ===
Team 1	Series	Team 2	Game 1	Game 2	Game 3	Game 4	Game 5
Anadolu Efes	3–0	Beşiktaş Icrypex	96–77	104–86	96–66	–	–
Fenerbahçe Beko	3–1	Pınar Karşıyaka	83–79	71–80	67–62	78–76	–

=== Finals ===
Team 1	Series	Team 2	Game 1	Game 2	Game 3	Game 4	Game 5
Anadolu Efes	3–0	Fenerbahçe Beko	111–71	95–73	93–66	–	–

== Statistical leaders ==
=== Efficiency ===
Pos	Player	Club	PIR
1	(Turkey) Alperen Şengün	Beşiktaş Icrypex	26.76
2	(France) Mouhammadou Jaiteh	Empera Halı Gaziantep Basketbol	21.71
3	(United Kingdom) Gabriel Olaseni	Büyükçekmece Basketbol	20.56
4	(France) Adrien Moerman	Anadolu Efes	19.43
5	(United States) Raymar Morgan	Pınar Karşıyaka	19.22

=== Points ===
Pos	Player	Club	PPG
1	(Mexico) Paco Cruz	HDI Sigorta Afyon Belediye	19.56
2	(Turkey) Alperen Şengün	Beşiktaş Icrypex	19.21
3	(Canada) Kyle Wiltjer	Türk Telekom	18.72
4	(United States) James Blackmon	Beşiktaş Icrypex	18.48
5	(United States) Erick Green	Bahçeşehir Koleji	17.88

=== Rebounds ===
Pos	Player	Club	RPG
1	(France) Mouhammadou Jaiteh	Empera Halı Gaziantep Basketbol	11.00
2	(Turkey) Alperen Şengün	Beşiktaş Icrypex	9.38
3	(United Kingdom) Gabriel Olaseni	Büyükçekmece Basketbol	9.07
4	(France) Adrien Moerman	Anadolu Efes	8.05
5	(United States) Rashard Kelly	Empera Halı Gaziantep Basketbol	7.83

=== Assists ===
Pos	Player	Club	APG
1	(United States) Chris Wright	HDI Sigorta Afyon Belediye	8.33
2	(Turkey) Can Uğur Öğüt	Empera Halı Gaziantep Basketbol	6.61
3	(United States) Lamar Peters	Frutti Extra Bursaspor	6.39
4	(United States) Nick Johnson	Türk Telekom	6.18
5	(United States) Tu Holloway	OGM Ormanspor	6.00

Source: BSL Stats

== Awards ==
All official awards of the 2020–21 Basketbol Süper Ligi.

=== Season awards ===
Award	Player	Team	Ref.
Regular Season MVP	(Turkey) Alperen Şengün	Beşiktaş Icrypex	
Finals MVP	(France) Rodrigue Beaubois	Anadolu Efes	

=== MVP of the Round ===
Gameday	Player	Team	EFF	Ref.
1	(United States) Karvel Anderson	Büyükçekmece Basketbol	26	
1	(France) Nando de Colo	Fenerbahçe Beko	26	
2	(Turkey) Oğuz Savaş	Frutti Extra Bursaspor	34	
3	(United States) Rashard Kelly	Empera Halı Gaziantep Basketbol	35	
4	(Turkey) Thomas Wimbush	Petkim Spor	36	
5	(France) Mouhammadou Jaiteh	Empera Halı Gaziantep Basketbol	30	
6	(United States) Erick Neal	Lokman Hekim Fethiye Belediyespor	40	
7	(Croatia) Krunoslav Simon	Anadolu Efes	48	
8	(United States) Grant Jerrett	Darüşşafaka Tekfen	35	
9	(Turkey) Alperen Şengün	Beşiktaş Icrypex	36	
10	(United States) Daryl Macon	Galatasaray	35	
11	(United Kingdom) Gabriel Olaseni	Büyükçekmece Basketbol	42	
12	(Turkey) Alperen Şengün (2)	Beşiktaş Icrypex	43	
13	(France) Mouhammadou Jaiteh (2)	Empera Halı Gaziantep Basketbol	33	
14	(Turkey) Alperen Şengün (3)	Beşiktaş Icrypex	39	
15	(United States) Tu Holloway	OGM Ormanspor	35	
16	(United States) Raymar Morgan	Pınar Karşıyaka	30	
17	(United States) James Blackmon	Beşiktaş Icrypex	32	
18	(United States) Nick Johnson	Türk Telekom	35	
19	(Turkey) Alperen Şengün (4)	Beşiktaş Icrypex	32	
20	(United States) Elgin Cook	Lokman Hekim Fethiye Belediyespor	41	
21	(France) Amath M'Baye	Pınar Karşıyaka	26	
22	(Turkey) Alperen Şengün (5)	Beşiktaş Icrypex	34	
23	(France) Amath M'Baye (2)	Pınar Karşıyaka	29	
24	(France) Nando de Colo (2)	Fenerbahçe Beko	26	
25	(United States) Kyle O'Quinn	Fenerbahçe Beko	38	
26	(Germany) İsmet Akpınar	Bahçeşehir Koleji	35	
27	(Turkey) Tarik Biberovic	Fenerbahçe Beko	37	
27	(United States) Jordan Crawford	Galatasaray	37	
27	(United States) Pierre Jackson	Galatasaray	37	
28	(France) Adrien Moerman	Anadolu Efes	27	
29	(United States) Rashard Kelly (2)	Empera Halı Gaziantep Basketbol	36	
30	(France) Mouhammadou Jaiteh (3)	Empera Halı Gaziantep Basketbol	34	

=== MVP of the Month ===
Month	Player	Team	EFF	Ref.
2020
October	(Turkey) Alperen Şengün	Beşiktaş Icrypex	27.1	
November	(Turkey) Alperen Şengün (2)	Beşiktaş Icrypex	31	
December	(Turkey) Alperen Şengün (3)	Beşiktaş Icrypex	24	
2021
January	(Turkey) Alperen Şengün (4)	Beşiktaş Icrypex	25.4	
February	(United Kingdom) Gabriel Olaseni	Büyükçekmece Basketbol	28.0	
March	(Turkey) Alperen Şengün (5)	Beşiktaş Icrypex	24.7	

== Turkish clubs in European competitions ==
Team	Competition	Progress
Anadolu Efes	EuroLeague	Champions
Fenerbahçe Beko	EuroLeague	Quarterfinals
Bahçeşehir Koleji	EuroCup	Regular season
Frutti Extra Bursaspor	EuroCup	Regular season
Darüşşafaka Tekfen	Champions League	Regular season
Galatasaray	Champions League	Regular season
Pınar Karşıyaka	Champions League	Runners-up
Tofaş	Champions League	Playoffs
Türk Telekom	Champions League	Playoffs
Beşiktaş Icrypex	FIBA Europe Cup	Regular season
