= Polat Kaya =

Turkish basketball player (born 1986)

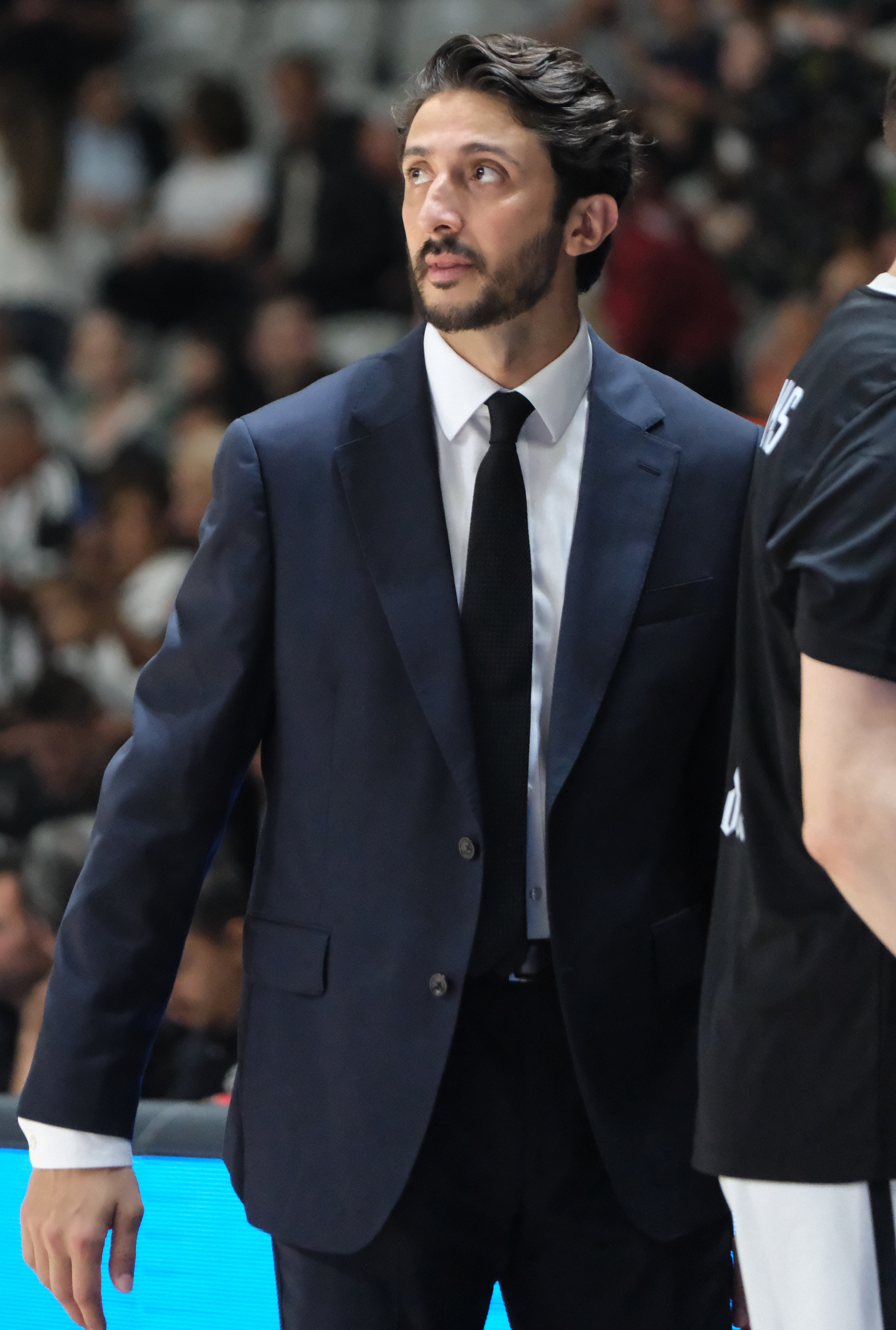

London Lions
- Title: Assistant coach
- League: BBL

Personal information
- Born: 6 January 1986 (age 40) Istanbul
- Listed height: 6 ft 6 in (1.98 m)
- Listed weight: 216 lb (98 kg)

Career information
- NBA draft: 2005: undrafted
- Playing career: 2003–2022
- Position: Small forward
- Number: 6, 15

Career history

Playing
- 2003–2005: Darüşşafaka
- 2005–2007: Bandırma B.İ.K.
- 2007–2008: Mersin BB
- 2008–2009: TED Ankara
- 2009–2010: Darüşşafaka
- 2010–2011: Aliağa Petkim
- 2011–2012: Trabzonspor
- 2012–2013: Hacettepe Üniversitesi
- 2013–2014: Türk Telekom
- 2014–2015: TED Ankara
- 2015–2016: Acıbadem Üniversitesi
- 2016–2017: Socar Petkimspor
- 2017–2020: Türk Telekom
- 2020–2021: Lokman Hekim Fethiye Belediyespor
- 2021: Balıkesir Büyükşehir Belediyespor
- 2021–2022: Mersin BB

Coaching
- 2022–present: London Lions

Polat Kaya (born 6 January 1986) is a Turkish professional basketball coach and former player who played at the small forward position. He is assistant coach for London Lions of the British Basketball League (BBL).

== Professional career ==
In 2003, he started his professional career at Darüşşafaka. He transferred to Bandırma B.İ.K. in the 2004-2005 season and then he played at Mersin BB and TED Ankara.

In the 2017–2018 season, he became a member of Türk Telekom. On 29 September 2020, Kaya signed with Lokman Hekim Fethiye Belediyespor.

== Coaching career ==
Following retirement, he has started his coaching career by becoming assistant coach for London Lions of the British Basketball League (BBL).
