= BSL Most Valuable Player Award =

Sports award

The Basketbol Süper Ligi Most Valuable Player Award is an annual award of the Basketbol Süper Ligi, the top-tier professional basketball league in Turkey. The BSL handed out the award first after the 2020–21 Basketbol Süper Ligi.

Only one Turkish player has won the award so far, with Alperen Şengün being the last winner in 2021.

== All-time award winners ==
| ^ | Denotes player who is still active in the Basketbol Süper Ligi |
| † | Denotes player whose team won championship that year |
| Player (X) | Denotes the number of times the player had been named MVP at that time |
| Team (X) | Denotes the number of times a player from this team had won at that time |

| Season | Player | Position | Nationality | Team | Ref. |
|---|---|---|---|---|---|
| 2020–21 | Alperen Şengün | C | Turkey | Beşiktaş Icrypex | |
| 2021–22 | Alpha Kaba | F/C | Guinea | Gaziantep Basketbol | |
| 2022–23 | Tyrique Jones | F/C | United States | Türk Telekom | |
| 2023–24 | Austin Wiley | C | United States | Tofaş | |
| 2024–25 | Marcquise Reed^ | SG | United States | Tofaş (2) | |
| 2025–26 | Marcquise Reed^ (2) | SG | United States | Trabzonspor | |

== Awards won by club ==
| Club | Total |
|---|---|
| Tofaş | 2 |
| Beşiktaş | 1 |
| Gaziantep Basketbol | 1 |
| Türk Telekom | 1 |
| Trabzonspor | 1 |

== Awards won by nationality ==
| Country | Total |
|---|---|
| United States | 4 |
| Guinea | 1 |
| Turkey | 1 |

== See also ==
- Basketbol Süper Ligi Finals MVP
