= Stanley Whittaker =

American basketball player

Stanley Whittaker Jr.
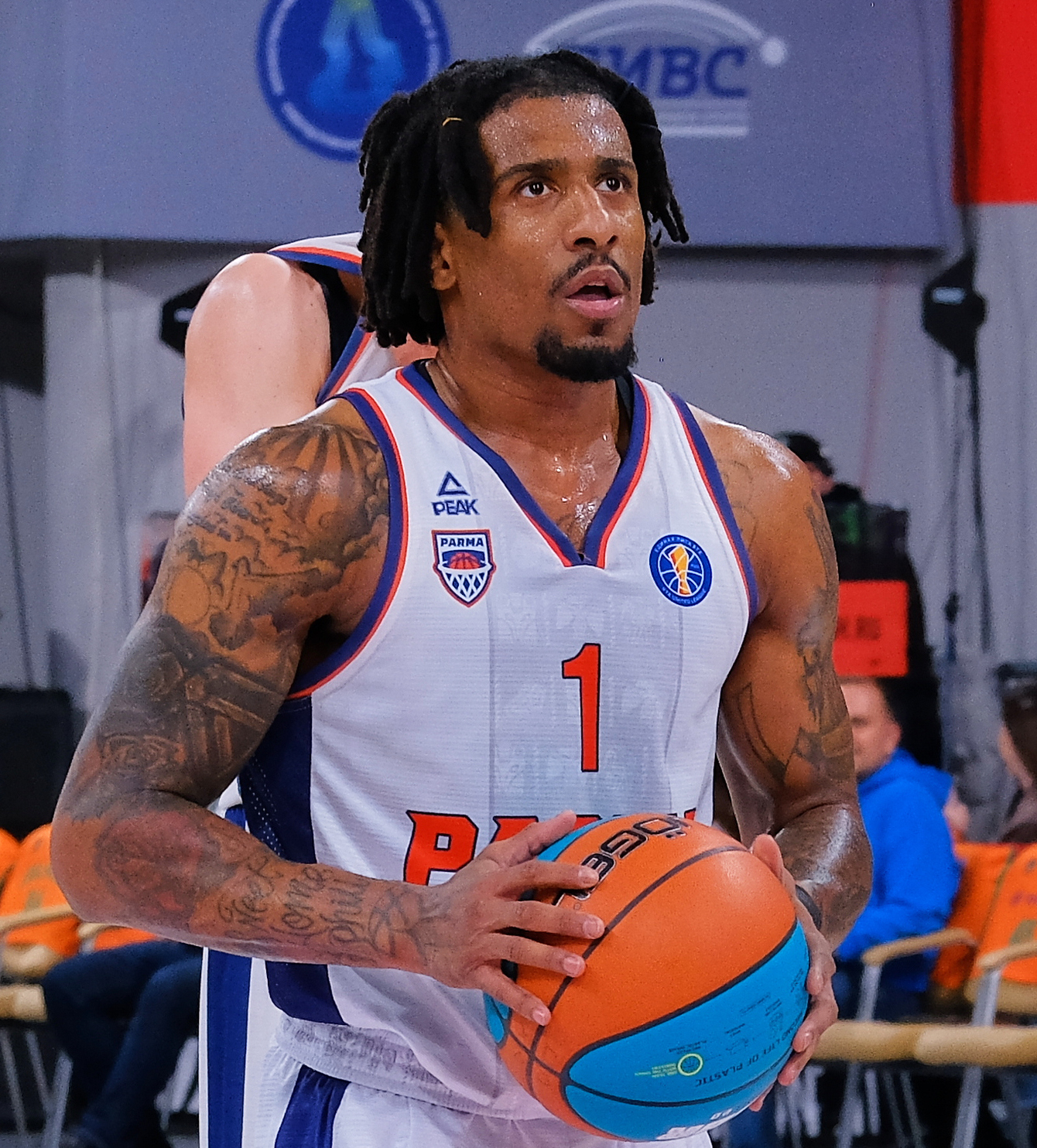
- Whittaker with BC Parma in 2025

No. 11 – Bàsquet Girona
- Position: Guard
- League: Liga ACB

Personal information
- Born: October 21, 1994 (age 32) Philadelphia, Pennsylvania, U.S.
- Listed height: 1.83 m (6 ft 0 in)
- Listed weight: 190 lb (86 kg)

Career information
- High school: Esperanza Academy Charter (Philadelphia, Pennsylvania)
- College: Frank Phillips (2013–2015); Keiser (2015–2017)
- Playing career: 2020–present

Career history
- 2020: BC Jonava
- 2020–2021: UBSC Graz
- 2021–2022: PS Karlsruhe Lions
- 2022–2023: s.Oliver Würzburg
- 2023: Dinamo Sassari
- 2024–2025: Uralmash Yekaterinburg
- 2025: Parma Basket
- 2025–2026: Petkim Spor
- 2026–present: Bàsquet Girona

Career highlights
- All-Bundesliga Second Team (2023); 2020–21 Austrian Basketball Superliga leading scorer; 2x NAIA All-American (2016, 2017)

Stanley Mace Whittaker Jr. (born October 21, 1994) is an American professional basketball player for Bàsquet Girona of the Liga ACB. He played college basketball for the Keiser University Seahawks, where he was coached by Rollie Massimino.

== College career ==
Stanley Whittaker attended Frank Phillips College from 2013 to 2015, before transferring to Keiser University in West Palm Beach, Florida. He graduated in 2017. At Keiser, he played under head coach Rollie Massimino who died in August 2017. Whittaker was a two-time NAIA All-American.

== Professional career ==
After his college education, Stanley Whittaker suffered several professional and personal setbacks. Whittaker couldn't find a job in basketball for two years. He kept in touch with his sport through training children.

In 2019, he had the first engagement with BC Jonava where he played a few games during the 2019–20 LKL season (Second Lithuanian league).

Fortunately for Whittaker, in January 2020, several players from UBSC Graz were involved in a betting scandal so Graz needed replacement players at short notice. Although Whittaker barely had time to settle in Austria, he scored over 18 points per game in his first season and averaged eight assists. He even improved this record in the 2020–21 Austrian Basketball Superliga with an average of over 21 points and eight assists. Besides being the league's best scorer, he also served as team captain for UBSC Graz.

In August 2021, he signed with PS Karlsruhe Lions of the German ProA. He scored over 22 points, got over 5 rebounds and made over 6 assists per game in 34 games for the PS Karlsruhe Lions.

In June 2022, he signed with s.Oliver Würzburg of the German Basketball Bundesliga. Whittaker wrapped-up the 2022–23 season as the team's leading scorer, averaging 18.0 points, while dishing out 5.1 assists per contest in Bundesliga play. On June 19, 2023, Dinamo Sassari of the Italian Lega Basket Serie A announced his signing.

On July 17, 2025, he signed with Petkim Spor of the Basketbol Süper Ligi (BSL). On February 9, 2026, he earned a Hoops Agents Player of the Week award after having the game-high 31 points, 5 rebounds and 6 assists in the team's win.

On July 18, 2026, he signed with Bàsquet Girona of the Liga ACB.
