= Fethiye Belediyespor =

Turkish professional basketball club

- Leagues: TBL
- Founded: 31 July 2000; 25 years ago
- Arena: Eldirek Spor Salonu
- Capacity: 2,000
- Location: Fethiye, Turkey
- Main sponsor: Lokman Hekim Esnaf Hastanesi
- President: İzzet Durak
- Head coach: Alkım Ay
- Team captain: Barış Hersek
- Website: www.fethiyebelediyespor.org

Fethiye Belediyespor is the professional basketball club that represents Fethiye in professional basketball leagues.

== History ==
The club was founded in 2000. After competing several season in lower divisions, the club promoted to TBL before 2019–20 season. Because of COVID-19 pandemic the season was cancelled, but before cancellation, they were in 2nd place after Petkim Spor.

At the start of 2020–21 season, after withdrawal of Teksüt Bandırma from Basketbol Süper Ligi, on September 18, 2020, TBF announced Fethiye Belediyespor will be the 16th team. This is the first season for the club at top-tier of Turkish basketball league system

== Players ==
=== Current roster ===
Note: Flags indicate national team eligibility at FIBA-sanctioned events. Players may hold other non-FIBA nationalities not displayed.

Fethiye Belediyespor roster
Players
Coaches

Pos.	No.	Nat.	Name	Ht.	Wt.	Age
G	4	(Turkey)	Töz, Fırat	1.88 m (6 ft 2 in)		34 – 21 February 1991
PG	5	(Turkey)	İlter, Erdem	2.03 m (6 ft 8 in)		34 – 15 October 1990
F/C	9	(Turkey)	Ercan, Caner	2.03 m (6 ft 8 in)		38 – 29 September 1986
SF	10	(Turkey)	Esen, Murat Can	1.94 m (6 ft 4 in)		35 – 2 January 1990
PF	11	(Turkey)	Hersek, Barış (C)	2.08 m (6 ft 10 in)	104 kg (229 lb)	37 – 26 March 1988
SF	12	(Turkey)	Baştürk, Mustafa	1.96 m (6 ft 5 in)	90 kg (198 lb)	29 – 17 January 1996
G/F	15	(Turkey)	Kaya, Polat	1.98 m (6 ft 6 in)	99 kg (218 lb)	39 – 6 January 1986
SF		(Turkey)	Sevinç, Ogün	1.98 m (6 ft 6 in)	100 kg (220 lb)	36 – 22 September 1988
C		(Turkey)	Kalkan, Engin	2.03 m (6 ft 8 in)		25 – 13 February 2000
G		(Turkey)	Erdoğan, Arda	1.88 m (6 ft 2 in)	83 kg (183 lb)	25 – 17 September 1999

Head coach

- (Turkey) Alkım Ay

Assistant coach(es)

- (Turkey) Barış Karayel
- (Turkey) Serhat Yapıcı

Legend

- (C) Team captain
- Injured

- Roster
Updated: August 3, 2021
