= Marcquise Reed =

American -Georgian basketball player (born 1995)

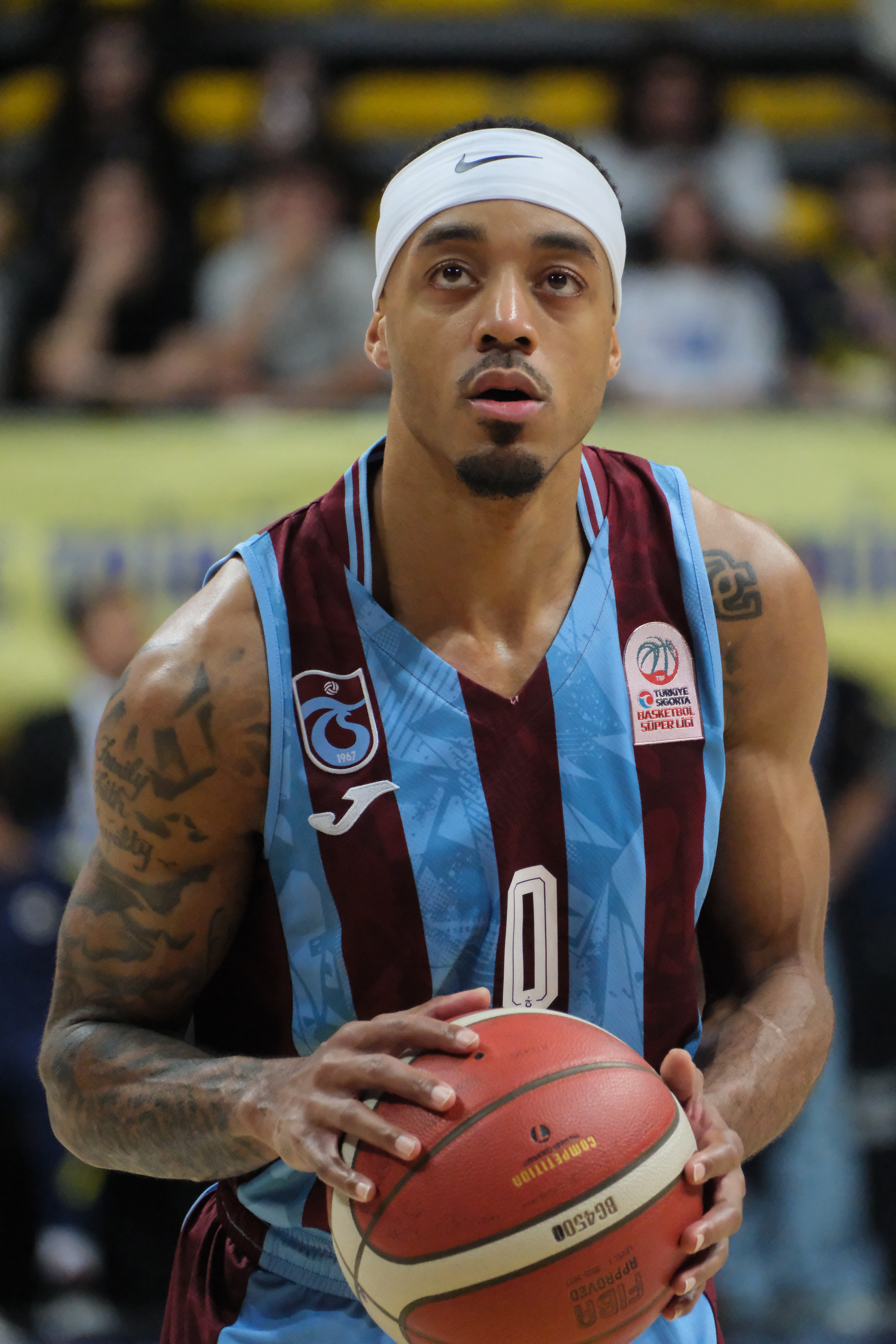
- Reed with Trabzonspor in 2026

No. 0 – Bahçeşehir Koleji
- Position: Shooting guard
- League: Basketbol Süper Ligi; EuroCup

Personal information
- Born: April 21, 1995 (age 31)
- Listed height: 6 ft 3 in (1.91 m)
- Listed weight: 193 lb (88 kg)

Career information
- High school: St. Vincent Pallotti (Laurel, Maryland); Capitol Christian Academy (Landover, Maryland)
- College: Robert Morris (2014–2015); Clemson (2016–2019)
- NBA draft: 2019: undrafted
- Playing career: 2019–present

Career history
- 2019–2020: Chorale Roanne
- 2020: Prometey
- 2020–2021: Nanterre 92
- 2021–2022: BCM Gravelines-Dunkerque
- 2022–2023: Brindisi
- 2023–2024: Büyükçekmece
- 2024–2025: Tofaş
- 2025–2026: Trabzonspor
- 2026–present: Bahçeşehir Koleji

Career highlights
- FIBA Europe Cup Top Scorer (2025); 2× Turkish League MVP (2025, 2026); 3× Turkish League scoring champion (2024, 2025, 2026); Second-team All-ACC (2018); Third-team All-ACC (2019)

Marcquise DeAndre Reed (born April 21, 1995) is an American-born naturalized Georgian professional basketball player for Bahçeşehir Koleji of the Turkish Basketbol Süper Ligi (BSL) and the EuroCup. He played college basketball for Clemson. Married in 2025 and has one son born in 2022.

== High school career ==
Reed attended St. Vincent Pallotti High School, where he was coached by Shae Johnson. His teammate, former St. John's and Texas Tech player Tariq Owens, received more attention from college coaches, who were often surprised by the play of Reed. As a senior, he transferred to Capitol Christian Academy and averaged 31.2 points per game, He received scholarship offers from the likes of Quinnipiac, Drexel, LIU-Brooklyn and UMBC and committed to Robert Morris. Reed cited the program's winning tradition as well as the relative proximity to his home in Maryland.

== College career ==
=== Robert Morris ===
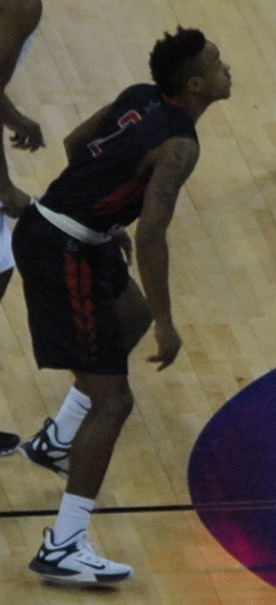
Reed playing for Robert Morris in 2015

In his second game as a freshman at Robert Morris, a loss to North Carolina, Reed scored 24 points. He was named Northeast Conference Rookie of the Week six times all season. At the conclusion of the regular season, Reed was named NEC Rookie of the Year as well as being an All-NEC Second Team selection. Robert Morris won the NEC Tournament to reach the NCAA Tournament, and Reed had 19 points in the First Four win over the North Florida Ospreys and 22 points in the loss to the No. 1 seed Duke Blue Devils. He finished second in scoring on the team behind Rodney Prior with 15.1 points per game.

=== Clemson ===
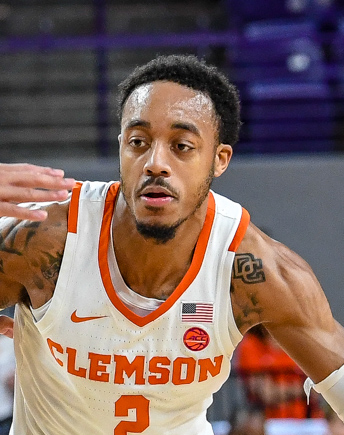
Reed with Clemson in 2018

Reed transferred to Clemson after the season because he wanted to play in the Atlantic Coast Conference. He sat out the 2015-16 season due to NCAA regulations. As a sophomore, Reed averaged 10 points per game in 21.5 minutes per game off the bench. Due to the graduation of star Jaron Blossomgame, coach Brad Brownell told Reed that he would need to play a bigger part on the team next year.

Reed led Clemson to a 12–1 start and their first AP Top 25 ranking in eight years on January 1, 2018. After the loss of senior power forward Donte Grantham on January 20, Reed had to shoulder more of the scoring load. Reed scored a career-high 28 points in a 65-58 loss to Virginia Tech on February 21. At the conclusion of the regular season, Reed was named to the All-ACC Second Team. As a junior, Reed led the Tigers in scoring with 15.8 points per game and added 4.6 rebounds per game on an NCAA Tournament team. After the season, he and teammate Shelton Mitchell declared for the 2018 NBA draft but did not hire agents to retain collegiate eligibility. Both Reed and Mitchell withdrew from the draft before the deadline and returned to Clemson.

Reed scored his 2,000th career point in his final college game, a second round NIT loss to Wichita State. As a senior, Reed averaged 19.4 points, 5.5 rebounds, and 2.1 steals per game.

== Professional career ==
After going undrafted in the 2019 NBA draft, Reed joined Chorale Roanne Basket of the LNB Pro A. He averaged 16.4 points per game in his rookie season. On July 17, 2020, Reed signed with Prometey Kamianske of the Ukrainian Basketball SuperLeague. However, he parted ways with the team on November 20.

On December 24, 2020, he has signed with Nanterre 92 of the LNB Pro A. Reed averaged 14.7 points, 4 rebounds and 2.3 assists per game. On July 22, 2021, he signed with BCM Gravelines-Dunkerque.

On July 16, 2022, he has signed with New Basket Brindisi of the Lega Basket Serie A.

On July 2, 2023, he signed with ONVO Büyükçekmece of the Basketbol Süper Ligi (BSL).

On June 12, 2024, he signed with Tofaş of Basketbol Süper Ligi (BSL).

On July 8, 2025, he signed with Trabzonspor of the Basketbol Süper Ligi (BSL). On December 30, 2025, Reed received a Hoops Agents Player of the Week award. He had the game high 31 points, 4 rebounds, and 4 assists in his team's win.
