= Alperen Şengün =

Turkish basketball player (born 2002)

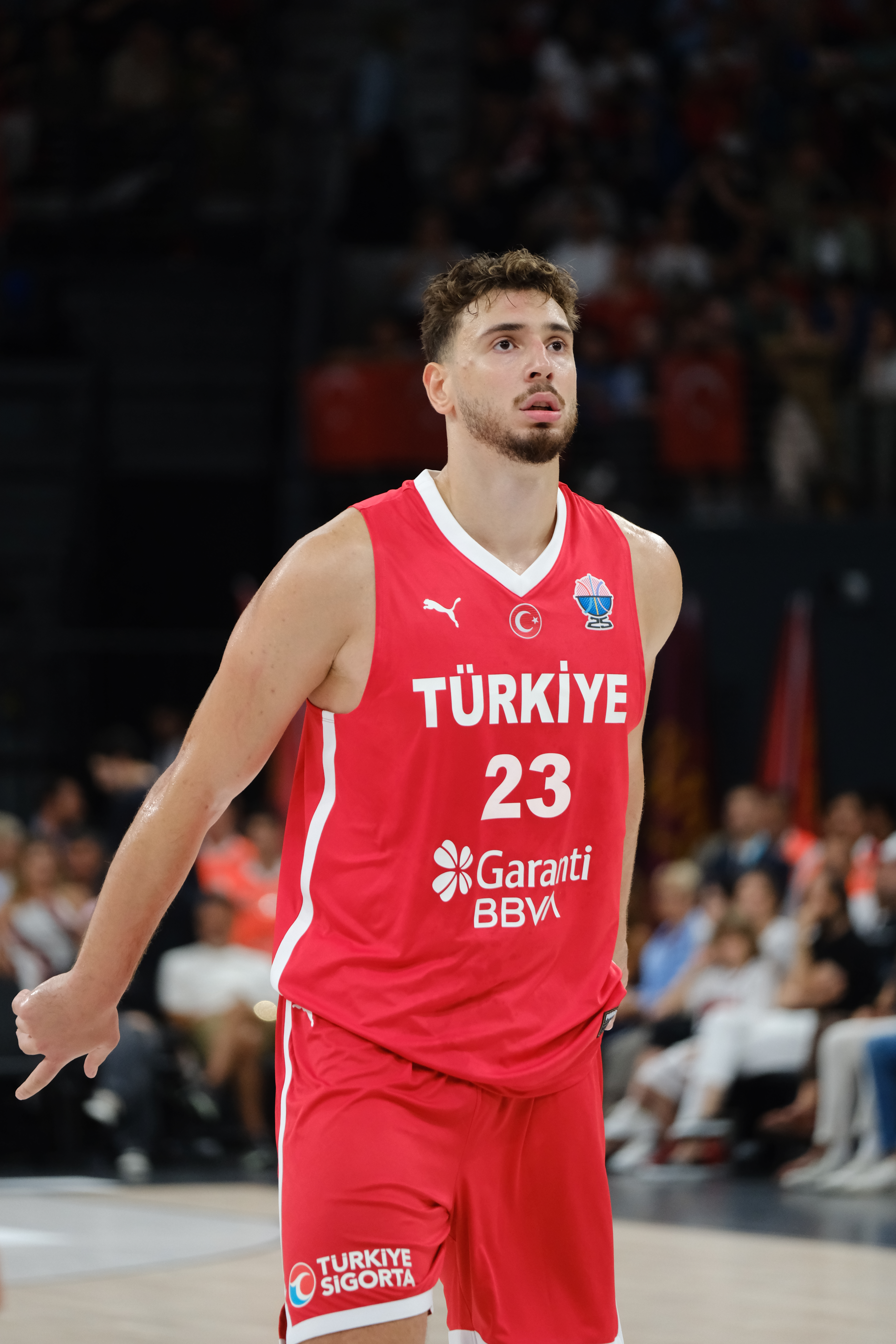
- Şengün with the Turkish national team in 2025

No. 28 – Houston Rockets
- Position: Center
- League: NBA

Personal information
- Born: 25 July 2002 (age 24) Giresun, Turkey
- Listed height: 6 ft 11 in (2.11 m)
- Listed weight: 271 lb (123 kg)

Career information
- NBA draft: 2021: 1st round, 16th overall pick
- Drafted by: Oklahoma City Thunder
- Playing career: 2018–present

Career history
- 2018–2019: Bandırma Kırmızı
- 2019–2020: Teksüt Bandırma
- 2020–2021: Beşiktaş
- 2021–present: Houston Rockets

Career highlights
- 2× NBA All-Star (2025, 2026); Turkish Super League MVP (2021)
- Stats at NBA.com
- Stats at Basketball Reference
Medals
Men's basketball
Representing Turkey
EuroBasket
Silver medal – second place	2025 Cyprus–Finland–Poland–Latvia
FIBA Europe U-18 Championship
Silver medal – second place	2019 Greece	Under-18
FIBA Europe U-16 Championship
Bronze medal – third place	2018 Serbia	Under-16

Alperen Şengün (Turkish pronunciation: [ˈaɫpeɾæn ˈʃæɲɟyn], born 25 July 2002) is a Turkish professional basketball player for the Houston Rockets of the National Basketball Association (NBA). He also represents the senior Turkish national team. Known for his post skills and creative playmaking abilities, he was taken by the Oklahoma City Thunder as the sixteen pick in the 2021 NBA draft and was immediately traded to the Houston Rockets. He is a two-time NBA All-Star, having been selected in 2025 and 2026.

== Early life and youth career ==
Şengün was born on 25 July 2002 in Giresun, a city in northeastern Turkey, to Kemal Şengün, a fisherman and former point guard who played in Turkey's first division in the late 1980s, and Ayşe Şengün. Although his parents wanted him to pursue swimming, he developed an appreciation for basketball after watching his older brother play. Şengün started to play basketball at the age of eight and trained in both basketball and swimming; however, due to the limited time available to train in both, he chose basketball.

=== Youth career: Giresun University and Banvit (2012–2019) ===
In 2012, Şengün began playing youth basketball with teams affiliated with the sports club of Giresun University, where he remained until 2014.

After being scouted by head coach Ahmet Gürgen during a youth sports festival, Şengün moved to Bandırma, in northwestern Turkey, where he signed a youth contract with Banvit on 19 August 2014. During the 2018–19 season, while playing for Banvit's under-19 team, Şengün won the Turkish Basketball Youth League championship, which had been established in 2017. He was also named the league's MVP.

== Professional career ==
=== Bandırma Kırmızı (2018–2019) ===
Şengün began his professional club career during the 2018–19 TBL season with Bandırma Kırmızı, a team competing in the second-tier Turkish First League (TBL). Over 29 games, he averaged 10.8 points, 6.8 rebounds and 1.2 assists in 21.9 minutes per game. He shot 47.6 percent from the field overall, including 53.6 percent on two-point attempts, 25.9 percent from three-point range, and 60.0 percent from the free-throw line.

=== Teksüt Bandırma (2019–2020) ===
For the 2019–20 BSL season, Şengün joined Turkish Super League (BSL) club Teksüt Bandırma, a club in the top-tier Turkish Super League. In 22 league games, he averaged 5.0 points and 3.9 rebounds in 13.5 minutes per game. He recorded a field goal percentage of 51.1 percent overall, including 57.5 percent on two-point attempts, 0-for-10 from three-point range, and 58.6 percent from the free-throw line.

He also competed in the FIBA Basketball Champions League, one of Europe's secondary-level club competitions. During the 2019–20 BCL season, he appeared in 15 games, averaging 6.6 points and 3.3 rebounds in 14.9 minutes per game. He shot 48.0 percent from the field overall, including 53.6 percent on two-point attempts, 31.6 percent from three-point range, and 63.6 percent from the free-throw line.

=== Beşiktaş (2020–2021) ===
In August 2020, Şengün signed a three-year contract with the Turkish club Beşiktaş. He had an outstanding regular season, averaging 19.2 points, 9.4 rebounds, 2.5 assists, 1.3 steals, and 1.7 blocks in 28.3 minutes per game across 29 appearances in the Basketball Super League. On 12 May 2021, he was named the BSL Most Valuable Player for the regular season. On the same day, he announced his decision to enter the 2021 NBA draft.

Over the course of the 2020–21 BSL season, Şengün averaged 18.6 points, 8.9 rebounds, 2.7 assists, 1.3 steals, and 1.5 blocks in 28.1 minutes per game across 34 appearances. He shot 62.6 percent from the field overall, including 66.7 percent on two-point attempts, 21.2 percent from three-point range, and 81.2 percent from the free-throw line. Şengün also competed with Beşiktaş in the FIBA Europe Cup, a fourth-tier European-wide competition. During the 2020–21 season, he appeared in three games, averaging 23.0 points, 7.3 rebounds, 2.7 assists, 1.7 steals, and 2.0 blocks in 29.7 minutes per game. He shot 71.0 percent from the field overall, including 75.9 percent on two-point attempts, 0–2 from three-point range, and 69.4 percent from the free-throw line.

=== Houston Rockets (2021–present) ===
==== 2021–22 season: Rookie season ====
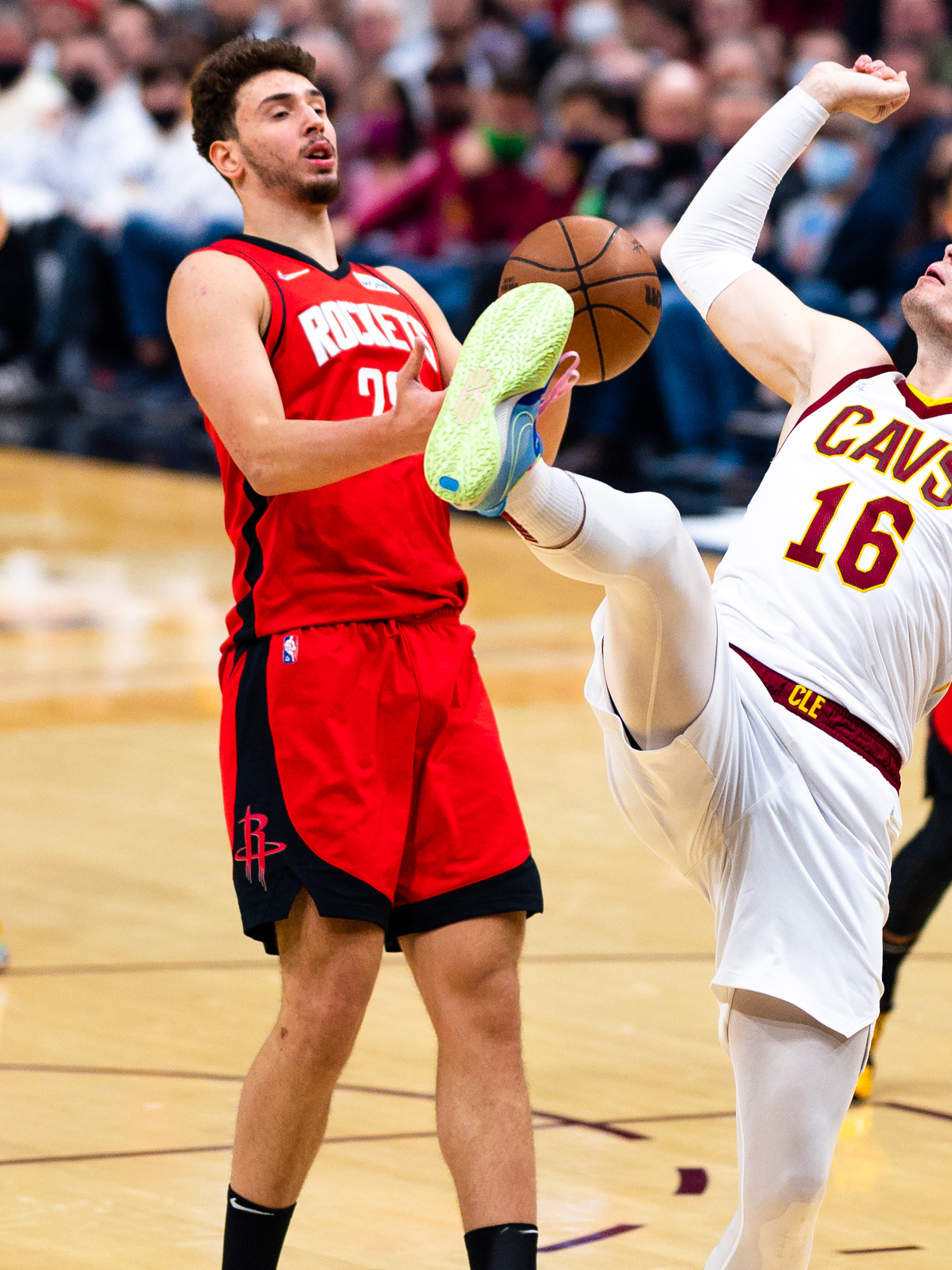
Şengün during his rookie season with the Rockets in December 2021

Prior to the 2021 NBA draft, Şengün was projected to be a potential lottery draft pick but was ultimately selected outside the lottery with the 16th overall pick by the Oklahoma City Thunder. The Thunder had acquired the 16th pick from the Boston Celtics as part of a trade that sent Kemba Walker to Oklahoma City in exchange for Al Horford, Moses Brown, and a 2023 second-round pick. Shortly after selecting Şengün, the Thunder traded his draft rights to the Houston Rockets in exchange for two future first-round picks. On 7 August 2021, he signed a contract with the Rockets.

Şengün made his NBA debut on 20 October 2021, playing approximately 18 minutes and recording 11 points, six rebounds, two assists, and three steals in a 106–124 loss to the Minnesota Timberwolves. During his rookie season, Şengün primarily served as a backup center behind Christian Wood and Daniel Theis. Midway through the season, he took on a more prominent role in the frontcourt rotation after Theis was traded away at the deadline. On 9 March 2022, Şengün posted 21 points and 14 rebounds in a 139–130 overtime win against the Los Angeles Lakers. Seventeen days later, he recorded a season-high 27 points along with seven rebounds in a 115–98 win over the Portland Trail Blazers. In his rookie season, Şengün appeared in 72 games, starting 13 and missing 10 of them, averaging 9.6 points, 5.5 rebounds, and 2.6 assists per game.

==== 2022–23 season: Improving as a sophomore ====
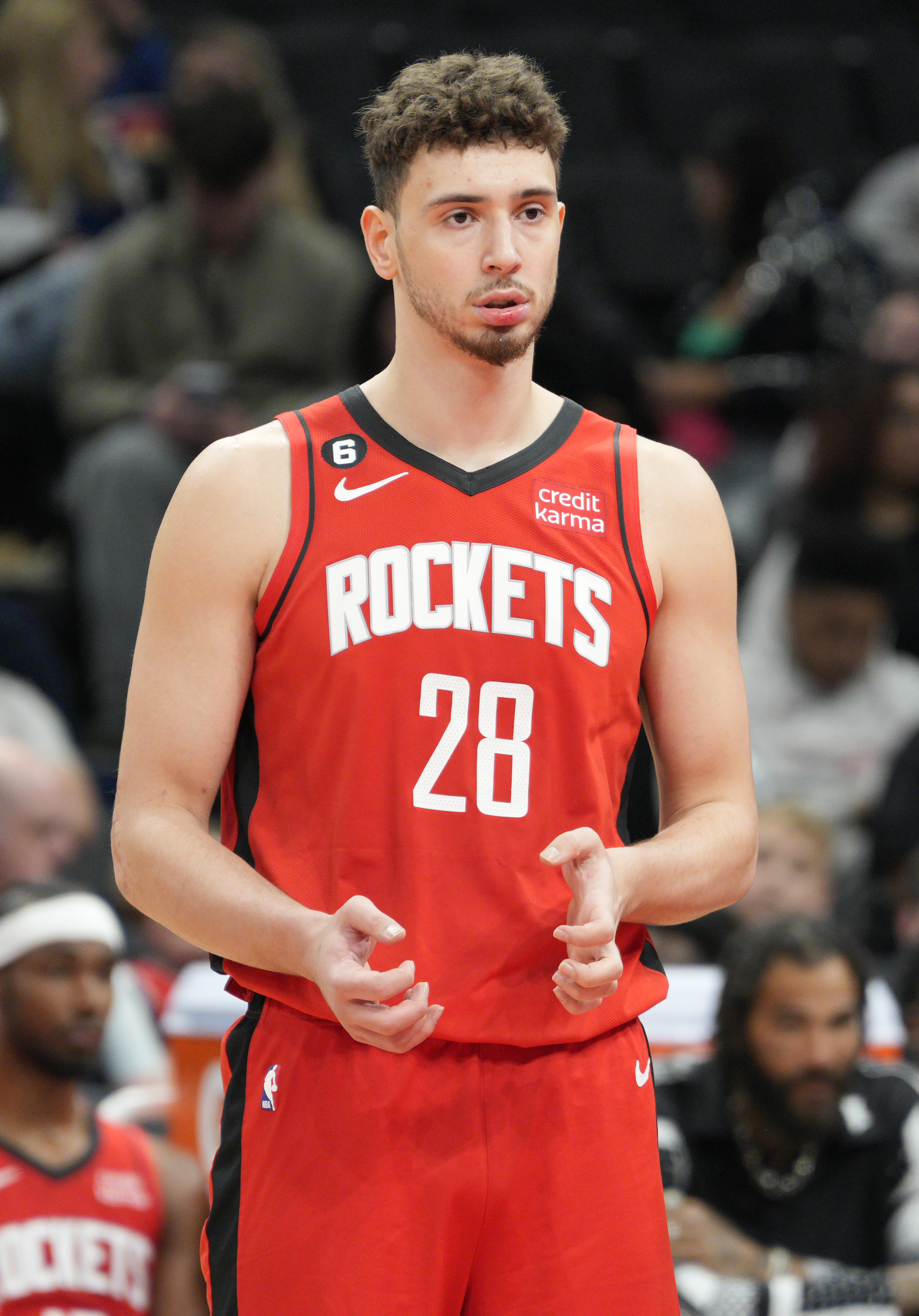
Şengün with the Houston Rockets in 2023

At the beginning of the offseason, the Houston Rockets traded Christian Wood to the Dallas Mavericks, creating an opportunity for Şengün to be a starter. However, head coach Stephen Silas selected Bruno Fernando as the starting center, with him as a rim protector. Fernando had a patellar tendinitis injury in his left knee early in the season, and in his absence, Şengün was promoted to the starting lineup. On 26 November 2022, he recorded 21 points, seven assists, and a then-career-high 19 rebounds in a 118–105 win over the Oklahoma City Thunder. On 6 December 2022, in a 132–123 win over the Philadelphia 76ers, Şengün became the youngest center in NBA history to record at least 1,000 points and 200 assists at 20 years and 133 days old, surpassing Brad Daugherty's previous record of 21 years and 153 days old.

I think he's very talented. It might sound weird, but I think they should play through him more. Because sometimes they seem too stagnant as a team. Especially when they focus on shooting a lot of threes. The man is talented. He can pass the ball, post up, has the touch, and is a good finisher around the rim. You can see different moves when he is playing.

— Nikola Jokić, on Alperen Şengün, 29 November 2022

On 11 January 2023, Şengün recorded his first career triple-double with 10 points, 10 rebounds, and 10 assists in a 135–115 loss to the Sacramento Kings, becoming the youngest player in Houston Rockets history to achieve a triple-double in a game. On 16 January 2023, he posted a season-high 33 points, along with 15 rebounds, six assists, and four blocks in a 140–132 loss to the Los Angeles Lakers. He became the youngest player in Houston Rockets history to record at least 30 points and 10 rebounds in a game, surpassing the previous record set by Hakeem Olajuwon in 1984. He also became the youngest center in NBA history to record at least 30 points, 15 rebounds, and five assists in a game, breaking Shaquille O'Neal's record set in 1993. On 25 January 2023, Şengün recorded his second career triple-double with 21 points, 11 rebounds, and 10 assists in a 108–103 loss to the Washington Wizards. He became the youngest center in NBA history to record multiple triple-doubles. On 7 April 2023, he recorded a season-high 21 rebounds, along with 14 points in a win against the Charlotte Hornets. He also led all centers aged 20 or younger in assists per game, surpassing his own mark from his rookie season.

Şengün started in 72 out of 75 games he played, with averages of 14.8 points, 9.0 rebounds, and 3.9 assists per game. He shot 55.3 percent from the field and averaged 28.9 minutes per game. His sophomore campaign drew praise from NBA stars: Kevin Durant liked his game; Paul George compared his passing and rebounding to Magic Johnson, Pau Gasol, and Nikola Jokić; and Anthony Edwards said the Rockets should build around Şengün.

==== 2023–24 season: Breakthrough ====
Following recorded back-to-back 60-loss seasons, the Houston Rockets dismissed Stephen Silas as head coach and hired coach Ime Udoka. Udoka planned to build the offense around Şengün, while also focusing on improving his defense. On 31 October 2023, the Rockets announced that they had exercised Şengün's fourth-year option. In a victory over the Charlotte Hornets, Şengün became the youngest center to reach 500 assists, surpassing Nikola Jokić's previous record. On 20 November 2023, Şengün became the youngest player in Rockets history to record at least 2,000 points, 1,000, rebounds, and 500 assists, surpassing the previous record held by Rodney McCray. On 23 December 2023, Şengün scored 37 points, along with 11 rebounds and six assists in a 106–104 win against the New Orleans Pelicans.

During the week of 1 to 7 January 2024, Şengün led the Rockets to a 3–1 record and was awarded his first career NBA Player of the Week honor. On 20 January, he recorded 37 points, 14 rebounds, and six assists in a 127–126 overtime win over the Utah Jazz. The following day, he posted his first triple-double of the season with 21 points, 12 rebounds, and 10 assists in a 116–107 loss against the Boston Celtics. On 24 January, Şengün and teammate Jalen Green became the first duo in NBA history to each record at least 30 points and 10 rebounds in the same game while both were 21 years old or younger, in a 135–119 win against the Los Angeles Lakers. On 5 March, Şengün scored a career-high 45 points and grabbed 16 rebounds in a 114–101 win over the San Antonio Spurs, while being guarded by rookie Victor Wembanyama. His 45 points surpassed Mehmet Okur, who had previously scored 43 in 2009, for the highest single-game point total by a Turkish player in NBA history. He became the fifth player since the 1973–74 season, when steals began being officially recorded, to tally at least 45 points, 15 rebounds, and five steals in a game, joining Anthony Davis, Joel Embiid, James Harden, and John Drew. At 21 years and 224 days old, Şengün became the youngest player to reach those statistical thresholds in a single game. On 6 March, Şengün recorded his second triple-double of the season with 23 points, 19 rebounds, and a career-high 14 assists in a 122–116 loss to the Los Angeles Clippers. He became the first center in NBA history to record those numbers in a single game.

On 11 March, Şengün sustained a grade 3 ankle sprain in his right ankle and a bone bruise in his right knee after colliding with Sacramento Kings center Domantas Sabonis. The injury occurred with 39.1 seconds remaining in the fourth quarter, as the Rockets led by eight points. Şengün was unable to walk and exited the game in a wheelchair while receiving an ovation from the crowd at Golden 1 Center. He finished the game with 14 points, six rebounds, two assists, and two steals in 29 minutes, as the Rockets secured a 112–104 victory. Two days later, it was announced that Şengün would likely miss the remainder of the regular season due to the injury. With no timeline for his return, Şengün sat out for the rest of the season.

==== 2024–25 season: First All-Star and playoff appearance ====
On 21 October 2024, Şengün and the Houston Rockets agreed to a five–year, $185 million contract extension. In the season opener, Şengün recorded 25 points and 18 rebounds, but the coaching staff expressed concern about his defense and overall efficiency. In a subsequent loss to the Golden State Warriors, he played only 20 minutes before head coach Ime Udoka benched him in favor of Jabari Smith Jr. and Tari Eason. Udoka commented that Şengün needed "to find a rhythm, for sure. Whether it's getting himself into shape to play, early season might be part of it... but sometimes he's had point-blank misses that he didn't have as much of last year." Şengün responded with 25 points and 14 rebounds on 11-12 shooting from inside the arc in a win over the New York Knicks, followed later in November by back-to-back triple-doubles in victories over the Los Angeles Clippers and Chicago Bulls.

On 20 January 2025, Şengün recorded his 1,000th career assist with five assists against the Detroit Pistons, becoming the youngest center in NBA history to reach the milestone. After a 100–96 win over the Atlanta Hawks, he became the 16th player in NBA history to record at least 4,000 points, 2,000 rebounds, and 1,000 assists in approximately 250 games. He also became the fifth player to reach those totals along with at least 250 steals and 200 blocks, joining Alvan Adams, Larry Bird, Lionel Simmons, and Chris Webber. On 30 January, Şengün was named a reserve for the 2025 NBA All-Star Game, marking his first selection. He became the second Turkish player to be selected for the NBA All-Star Game, following Mehmet Okur in 2007.

On 4 February, Şengün returned from a three-game absence due to a left calf contusion and recorded 24 points, 20 rebounds, and four assists in a 99–97 loss to the Brooklyn Nets. In March 2025, Şengün recorded eight double-double games, helping the Rockets achieve a 12–1 run and secure the second seed in the Western Conference playoffs.

On 20 April, Şengün made his playoff debut in the first round of the 2025 NBA playoffs, recording 26 points, nine rebounds, and three steals in a 95–85 loss to the Golden State Warriors. The Rockets were eliminated in seven games despite Şengün's 21-point, 14-rebound, and five-assist performance in a 103–89 loss in Game 7.

==== 2025–26 season: Second All-Star appearance ====
In the opening night game against the Oklahoma City Thunder, Şengün recorded a season-high 39 points, along with 11 rebounds, seven assists, two steals, and a career-high five made three-pointers. Over a four-game stretch, Şengün became the youngest center in NBA history to reach 50 career games with at least 20 points, five rebounds, and five assists, and recorded the longest streak of five or more assists to start a season by a center aged 23 or younger.

On 14 November 2025, Şengün recorded 25 points, 10 rebounds, nine assists, two steals, three blocks, and four three-pointers against the Portland Trail Blazers, becoming the youngest player to reach or exceed those statistical marks in a single game. Şengün also joined Nikola Jokić as the only two centers in NBA history to record at least five assists in each of the first 11 games of a season. On 16 November 2025, against the Orlando Magic, Şengün recorded 30 points, 12 rebounds, eight assists, and two blocks, while shooting 35.5 percent (11-of-31) from the field. Şengün and Kevin Durant combined for 65 points, each hitting tying shots in the final 25 seconds of regulation. After, Durant was asked whether he had ever played with a center with Şengün's level of offensive gravity and said, "No, not at all. I’ve played with a lot of specialists as big men... but nobody that can score quite like that... That's how good Alpi is."

On 20 November, against the Cleveland Cavaliers, Şengün tallied 28 points on 10-of-17 shooting from the field, along with 11 rebounds, and 7 assists, becoming the first Houston Rockets player to record at least 25 points, 10 rebounds, and 5 assists in three consecutive games. After the game, when asked about facing elite defenders on the Cavaliers, Şengün said, "I never back down from anybody. Doesn't matter, even if they're the best defender in the league. Clutch time, I'm just going to go to the rim and get my shot and finish the game." On 3 December, Şengün achieved his 5,000th career point in a home game win against the Sacramento Kings. On 15 December, Sengun recorded his first triple-double of the season, with 33 points, 10 rebounds, and 10 assists, in a 128–125 overtime loss to the Denver Nuggets.

On February 2, 2026, Şengün tied his season-high with 39 points and added 16 rebounds and five assists to lead the Rockets to a 118–114 victory over the Indiana Pacers. On February 7, Şengün recorded his 10th career triple-double with 17 points, 12 rebounds, 11 assists, three steals and three blocks in a 112–106 win over the Oklahoma City Thunder. On February 8, Şengün was selected to the All-Star Game as an injury reserve for Team World, replacing Shai Gilgeous-Alexander, becoming Turkey's first two-time All-Star. On March 23, Şengün put up his fourth triple-double of the season, finishing with 33 points, 13 rebounds, 10 assists, two steals, and two blocks while shooting 16-of-19 from the field in a 132–124 loss to the Chicago Bulls.

After the Los Angeles Lakers eliminated the Houston Rockets in the 2026 NBA Playoffs, The Athletic released its annual anonymous player survey, and Şengün was voted the “Most Overrated Player”, receiving 10 votes (12.3%) of the 81 total votes amongst his peer. Former NBA player Robert Horry explains why Şengün was voted the NBA most overrated player: “It boils down to this day and age, they love flash. There's just nothing flashy about him. He's just basic and boring, and I think that's why they call him overrated, to me.”

==== 2026–27 season ====
He recorded his first triple-double this season in a 117-107 loss against the Minnesota Timberwolves with 17 points, 12 rebounds, ten assists and three blocks while shooting roughly 5-15 (33.3%) from the field. On November 13, 2026, Şengün recorded 43 points, 12 rebounds, five assists, one steal and one block on 17-of-24 shooting in a 125–118 victory over the Utah Jazz. He became the third player in Rockets franchise history, after Hakeem Olajuwon and Yao Ming, to record at least 40 points, 10 rebounds and five assists while shooting at least 70% from the field in a game.

== National team career ==
=== Junior national team ===
Şengün competed with the Turkish under-16 national team at the 2018 FIBA Under-16 European Championship, which was held in Novi Sad, Serbia. In the competition, he won the bronze medal. Şengün was also selected to the competition's All-Tournament Team. In seven games played with an average of 24.9 minutes, he recorded 14.4 points, 9.4 rebounds, 2.0 assists, 1.6 steals, and 1.4 blocks per game. He shot 56.9 percent from the field overall, including 61.9 percent on two-point attempts, 22.2 percent from three-point range, and 48.6 percent from the free-throw line.

He played a role on the Turkish under-17 national team that competed at the 2018 FIBA Under-17 World Cup, which was held in Argentina. Turkey ultimately finished in fifth place. In seven games with an average of 28.6 minutes, he averaged 15.9 points, 12.3 rebounds, and 2.0 assists. He shot 58.3 percent from the field overall, including 64.1 percent on two-point attempts, 12.5 percent from three-point range, and 56.5 percent from the free-throw line.

Şengün also played at the 2019 FIBA Under-18 European Championship, with the Turkish under-18 national team, which won the tournament's silver medal. He was also selected to that competition's All-Tournament Team, being the only Turkish player that was chosen for that honor. In seven games played at that tournament, he averaged 11.9 points, 9.0 rebounds, 2.0 assists, 1.6 steals and 1.7 blocks in 23.0 minutes per game. He shot 54.5 percent from the field overall, 59.2 percent on two-point field goal attempts, 16.7 percent on three-point field goal attempts and 59.5 percent from the free-throw line.

=== Senior national team ===
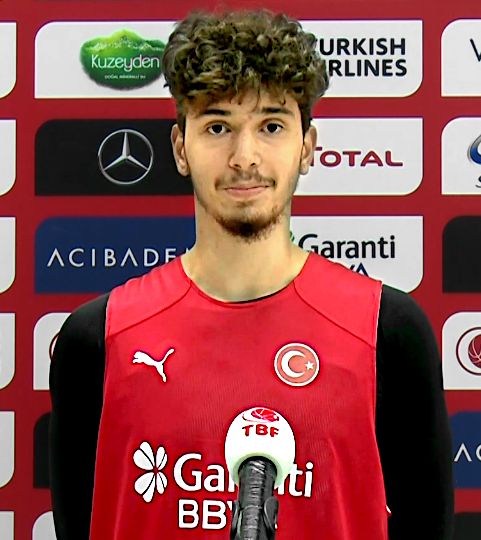
Şengün with the Turkey national team in 2020

In November 2020, Şengün joined the senior Turkish national team, as he played with Turkey at the 2022 EuroBasket Qualifiers. In four games played at the qualifiers, he averaged 12.0 points, 7.3 rebounds, 1.0 assists, 1.3 steals and 1.0 blocks in 23.1 minutes per game. He shot 53.3 percent from the field overall, 51.9 percent on two-point field goal attempts, 66.7 percent on three-point field goal attempts and 50 percent from the free-throw line.

In September 2022, Şengün played at EuroBasket 2022. He was the best player on the team, leading the team in points (16.8 per game) and rebounds (8.2 per game). Şengün and Turkey were eliminated in the round of 16 after losing to France in overtime.

On August 29, 2025, Şengün recorded 22 points, 11 rebounds, 9 assists, and 2 blocks in Turkey's 85–70 win over the Czech Republic in the second Group A match of EuroBasket 2025, narrowly missing a triple-double by one assist. On September 3, in the final Group A match, Şengün led Turkey to a 95–90 win over Serbia, finishing with 28 points, 13 rebounds, and 8 assists to secure first place in the group. On September 9, he finally recorded his triple double (19 points, 12 rebounds, 10 assists) and became the youngest player ever to record a triple-double in EuroBasket history, as Turkey defeated Poland in the quarterfinals. On September 12, 2025, Turkey overwhelmed Greece during the semifinals with a 68–94 win where he tallied 15 points, 12 rebounds, and 6 assists. On September 14, 2025, during the finals, Şengün recorded 28 points, 3 rebounds, 3 assists, and one block during an 83–88 loss against Germany, led by Franz Wagner and Dennis Schröder, securing the silver medal, his second since 2019. He was selected for the “all-star five” team for his distinguished performance in the tournament.

== Player profile ==
Şengün is 6 feet 11 inches (2.11 metres) tall and 243 pounds (110 kilograms) with a seven-foot (2.13 m) wingspan. Şengün plays at the power forward and center position. NBA commentators and scouts considered him a "skilled" and "productive" big man entering the 2021 NBA draft following his season in the Turkish League. With a solid frame and wide base, he is known for a versatile and highly efficient low-post game that utilizes drop steps, spin moves and fadeaways. Şengün is additionally equipped with a passing ability that is supplemented by what scouts view as an advanced feel for the court — that is, the ability to space the court, set screens, cut to the rim and make plays within the flow of the offense. As a defender, he is effective on on-ball matchups in isolation against other big men, though his defense in general has been criticized. His free-throw routine where he speaks to the basketball has also garnered attention by NBA commentators.

His skillset has been compared to such European big men as Domantas Sabonis and Nikola Vučević, and other big men such as Kevin Love, Kevin McHale and Tom Gugliotta. He has cited Nikola Jokić as an inspiration for his game.

== Career statistics ==
Legend
GP	Games played	GS	Games started	MPG	Minutes per game
FG%	Field goal percentage	3P%	3-point field goal percentage	FT%	Free throw percentage
RPG	Rebounds per game	APG	Assists per game	SPG	Steals per game
BPG	Blocks per game	PPG	Points per game	**Bold**	Career high

=== NBA ===
==== Regular season ====
Year	Team	GP	GS	MPG	FG%	3P%	FT%	RPG	APG	SPG	BPG	PPG
2021–22	Houston	72	13	20.7	.474	.248	.711	5.5	2.6	.8	.9	9.6
2022–23	Houston	75	72	28.9	**.553**	**.333**	**.715**	9.0	3.9	.9	.9	14.8
2023–24	Houston	63	63	32.5	.537	.297	.693	9.3	5.0	**1.2**	.7	**21.1**
2024–25	Houston	**76**	**76**	31.5	.496	.233	.692	**10.3**	4.9	1.1	.8	19.1
2025–26	Houston	72	72	**33.3**	.519	.305	.691	8.9	**6.2**	**1.2**	**1.1**	20.4
Career		358	296	29.3	.518	.281	.699	8.6	4.5	1.0	.9	16.9
All-Star		2	0	6.7	.500	.000	.500	3.0	2.0	.0	.0	2.5

==== Playoffs ====
Year	Team	GP	GS	MPG	FG%	3P%	FT%	RPG	APG	SPG	BPG	PPG
2025	Houston	**7**	**7**	36.6	.450	**.375**	.625	**11.9**	**5.3**	**1.9**	.4	**20.9**
2026	Houston	6	6	**38.7**	**.465**	.125	**.690**	10.2	4.7	1.8	**1.3**	20.3
Career		13	13	37.5	.457	.250	.659	11.1	5.0	1.8	.8	20.6

=== FIBA Champions League ===
Year	Team	GP	GS	MPG	FG%	3P%	FT%	RPG	APG	SPG	BPG	PPG	PIR
2019–20	Teksüt Bandırma	15	15	14.0	.480	.316	63.6	3.1	.6	.3	.7	6.6	5.3

=== FIBA Europe Cup ===
Year	Team	GP	GS	MPG	FG%	3P%	FT%	RPG	APG	SPG	BPG	PPG	PIR
2020–21	Beşiktaş	3	3	29.7	.710	.000	.694	7.3	2.7	1.7	2.0	23.0	24.3

=== Domestic leagues ===
Year	Team	League	GP	MPG	FG%	3P%	FT%	RPG	APG	SPG	BPG	PPG
2018–19	(Turkey) Bandirma Kirmizi	TBLS	29	22.3	.476	.259	.600	6.7	1.2	.8	.6	10.7
2019–20	(Turkey) Teksüt Bandırma	TBLS	22	13.5	.511	.000	.586	3.8	.6	.5	.3	4.9
2020–21	(Turkey) Beşiktaş	TBLS	34	28.0	.626	.212	.812	8.8	2.7	1.2	1.5	18.6
