= Charles Manning (basketball) =

American basketball player (born 1998)

No. 21 – Sabah BC
- Position: Shooting guard / small forward
- League: Azerbaijan Basketball League; Champions League

Personal information
- Born: October 22, 1998 (age 27) Riverhead, New York, U.S.
- Listed height: 6 ft 5 in (1.96 m)
- Listed weight: 194 lb (88 kg)

Career information
- High school: Bridgehampton (Bridgehampton, New York)
- College: Florida SouthWestern (2017–2019); LSU (2019–2021); South Alabama (2021–2022)
- NBA draft: 2022: undrafted
- Playing career: 2022–present

Career history
- 2022–2023: Metalac
- 2023: FMP
- 2023–2024: Oldenburg
- 2024: Napoli
- 2024–2025: Avtodor
- 2025–2026: Karşıyaka Basket
- 2026–present: Sabah BC

Career highlights
- Second-team All-Sun Belt (2022)

Charles Maurice Manning Jr. (born October 22, 1998) is an American professional basketball player for Sabah BC of the Azerbaijan Basketball League.

== College career ==
Manning began his college career at Florida SouthWestern and was a junior college All-American. After two seasons, he transferred to LSU. He was sidelined during his junior season with a broken foot. Manning averaged 7.9 points and 3.2 rebounds per game during the COVID-19 shortened 2019-20 season. He played six games in 2020-21 and averaged 4.2 points and 3.0 rebounds per game before entering the transfer portal. Manning ultimately chose to transfer to South Alabama. He was named to the Second Team all-Sun Belt and first-team National Association of Basketball Coaches all-district after leading the Jaguars in scoring with 15.4 points per game.

== Professional career ==
In 2022, Manning moved to Europe and began his professional career with Metalac Belgrade, where he averaged 12.4 points, 3.8 rebounds, and 3.8 assists.

In February 2023, Manning joined FMP Belgrade. In seven games, he averaged 15.6 points per game.

On June 14, 2023, Manning signed a contract with the German club Oldenburg from the Basketball Bundesliga. He averaged 16.5 points per game while shooting 47% from three-point range.

On July 25, 2024, Manning signed a contract with the Italian club Napoli.

In December 2024, Charles signed a contract with the Russian club Avtodor. He left the team in August 2025.

In August 2025, Charles signed a contract with the Turkish club Karşıyaka.

On August 15, 2026, he signed with Sabah BC of the Azerbaijan Basketball League.
