= Barış Hersek =

Turkish basketball player (born 1988)

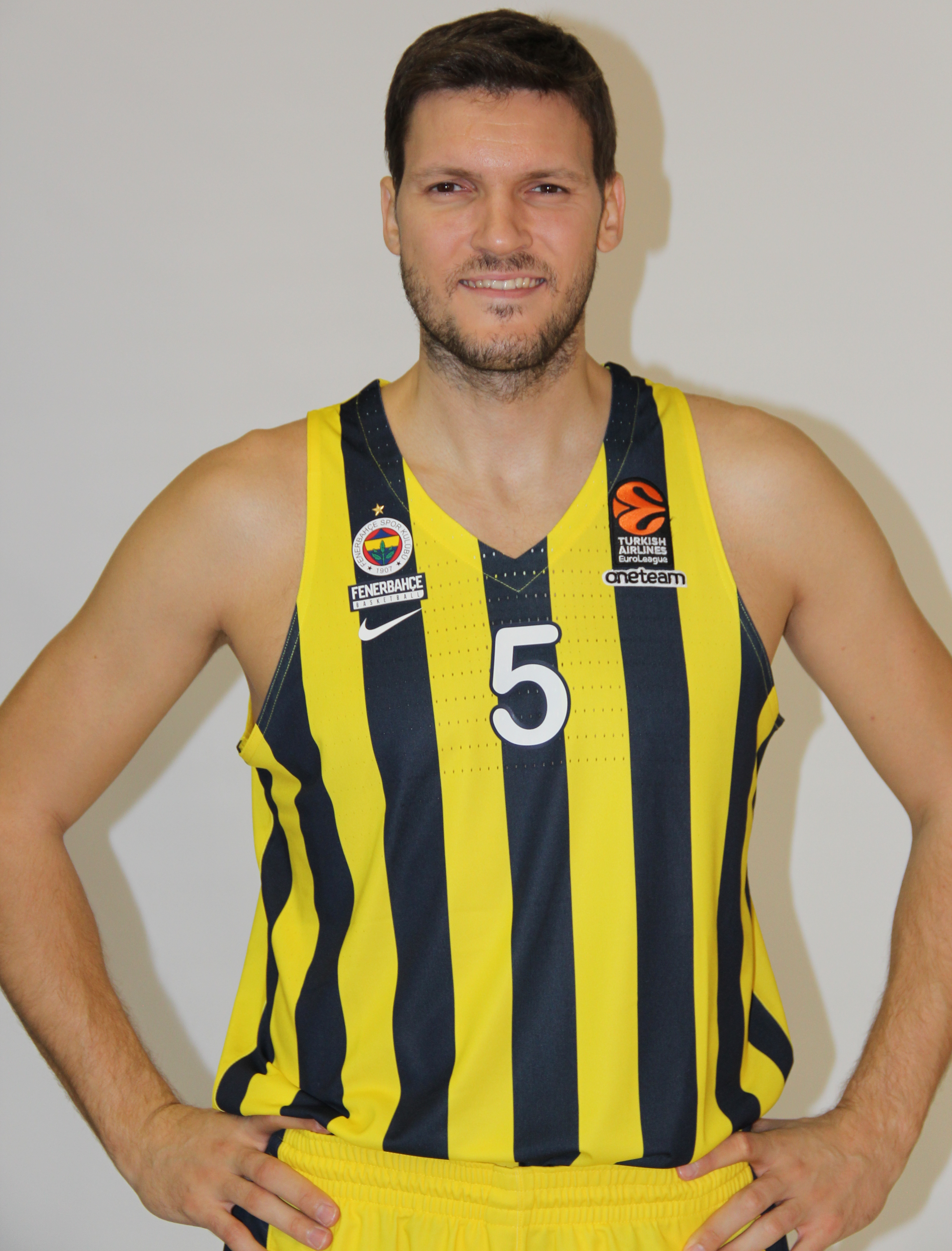
- Barış with Fenerbahçe in 2018

Personal information
- Born: 26 March 1988 (age 38) Kırklareli, Turkey
- Listed height: 6 ft 10 in (2.08 m)
- Listed weight: 229 lb (104 kg)

Career information
- NBA draft: 2010: undrafted
- Playing career: 2005–2021
- Position: Power forward

Career history
- 2005–2006: Pertevniyal
- 2006–2008: Efes Pilsen
- 2008–2009: Darüşşafaka
- 2009–2010: Banvit
- 2010–2011: Antalya BB
- 2011–2013: Beşiktaş
- 2013–2015: Karşıyaka
- 2015–2019: Fenerbahçe
- 2020–2021: Fethiye Belediyespor

Career highlights
- EuroLeague champion (2017); 5× Turkish League champion (2012, 2015, 2016, 2017, 2018); 5× Turkish Cup winner (2007, 2012, 2014, 2016, 2019); 4× Turkish President's Cup winner (2012, 2014, 2016, 2017); EuroChallenge champion (2012)
Medals
Men's basketball
Representing Turkey
Mediterranean Games
| Gold medal – first place | 2013 Turkey | Team |
| Bronze medal – third place | 2009 Italy | Team |

Barış Hersek (born 26 March 1988) is a Turkish former professional basketball player who played at the power forward position.

== Professional career ==
Hersek started his pro career with Perteniyal, in the Turkish 2nd Division in the 2005–06 season. In 2006, he moved to the Turkish club Anadolu Efes. In 2008, he joined the Turkish club Darüşşafaka, and in 2009, he moved to the Turkish club Banvit

He joined Antalya BB in 2010, and moved to Beşiktaş in 2011. He moved to Karşıyaka in 2013.

He signed with Fenerbahçe in 2015. He re-signed with the Turkish club for another two years on 23 June 2017. In 2017–18 EuroLeague, Fenerbahçe made it to the 2018 EuroLeague Final Four, its fourth consecutive Final Four appearance. Eventually, they lost to Real Madrid with 80–85 in the final game. On 10 July 2019 Hersek and Fenerbahçe officially parted ways.

On 6 October 2020 he signed with Lokman Hekim Fethiye Belediyespor of the Turkish Basketbol Süper Ligi.

== National team career ==
Hersek won the bronze medal with the Turkish national team at the 2009 Mediterranean Games in Pescara. Hersek also played in the Turkish national team which became the champion at the 2013 Mediterranean Games.

He also played with the senior Turkish national basketball team at the EuroBasket 2009, the 2014 FIBA Basketball World Cup, and the EuroBasket 2015.

== Career statistics ==
Legend
| GP | Games played | GS | Games started | MPG | Minutes per game |
| FG% | Field-goal percentage | 3P% | 3-point field-goal percentage | FT% | Free-throw percentage |
| RPG | Rebounds per game | APG | Assists per game | SPG | Steals per game |
| BPG | Blocks per game | PPG | Points per game | PIR | Performance index rating |
| **Bold** | Career high |

=== EuroLeague ===
| † | Denotes seasons in which Hersek won the EuroLeague |

| Year | Team | GP | GS | MPG | FG% | 3P% | FT% | RPG | APG | SPG | BPG | PPG | PIR |
|---|---|---|---|---|---|---|---|---|---|---|---|---|---|
| 2006–07 | Efes | 4 | 0 | **11.5** | **.500** | **.333** | .500 | **1.8** | **.5** | **.8** | **.3** | **3.8** | **3.0** |
| 2007–08 | Efes | 3 | 0 | 4.7 | .250 | .000 | — | 1.3 | — | — | — | 0.7 | 0.3 |
| 2012–13 | Beşiktaş | 10 | 0 | 6.5 | .280 | .200 | **1.000** | 1.0 | .4 | .3 | — | 1.8 | 0.2 |
| 2015–16 | Fenerbahçe | **18** | 0 | 6.8 | .294 | .143 | — | .6 | .1 | .2 | .1 | 0.6 | -0.8 |
| 2016–17† | Fenerbahçe | 3 | 0 | 4.0 | .400 | .000 | — | — | — | .3 | — | 1.3 | -0.3 |
| 2017–18 | Fenerbahçe | 1 | 0 | 2.0 | — | — | — | — | — | — | — | 0.0 | -1.0 |
| Career | | 39 | 0 | 6.7 | .328 | .185 | .625 | .8 | .2 | .3 | .1 | 1.3 | 0.0 |
