= Özhan Çıvgın =

Turkish basketball coach (born 1979)

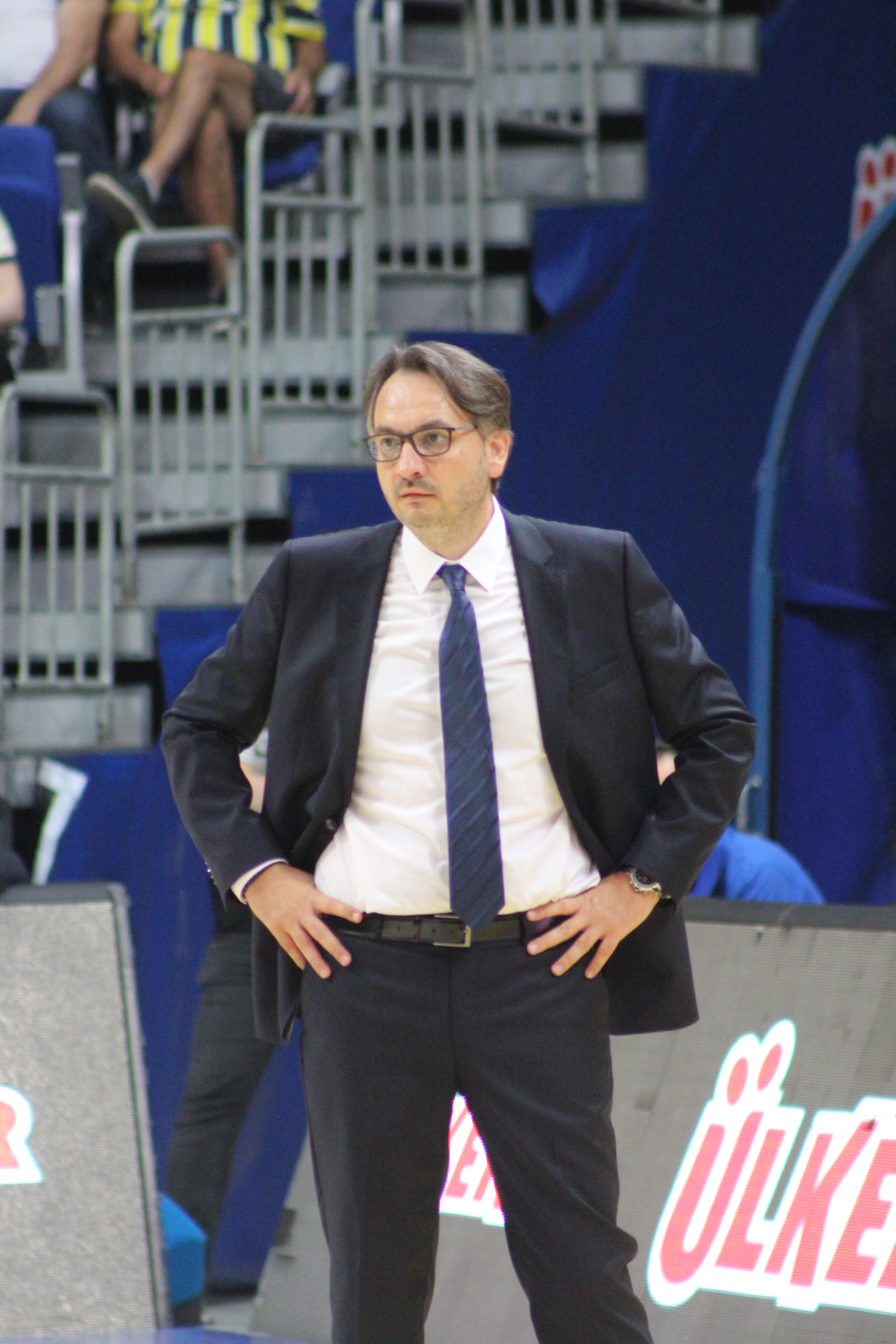

Personal information
- Born: 6 June 1979 (age 47) Istanbul, Turkey
- Position: Head coach
- Coaching career: 1999–present

Career history

Coaching
- 1999–2010: Darüşşafaka (assistant)
- 2010–2013: Erdemir (assistant)
- 2013: Erdemir
- 2013–2018: Tüyap Üniversitesi Büyükçekmece
- 2018–2019: Pınar Karşıyaka
- 2019–2020: Akhisar Belediyespor
- 2020–2025: Büyükçekmece Basketbol
- 2025–2026: Petkim Spor

Özhan Çıvgın (born 6 June 1979) is a Turkish professional basketball coach, who was most recently the head coach for Petkim Spor of the Turkish Basketball Super League.
