= Petkim Spor =

- Leagues: Basketbol Süper Ligi
- Founded: 2013; 13 years ago
- History: Socar Spor; 2013–present
- Arena: Aliağa Belediyesi ENKA Spor Salonu
- Capacity: 3,000
- Location: İzmir, Turkey
- Team colors: Red and White
- President: Cüneyt Aksu
- Head coach: Orhun Ene
- Team captain: Thomas Akyazılı
- Website: petkimspor.org
Home	Away

Petkim Spor Kulübü, more commonly known as Socar Spor is a Turkish professional basketball club based in İzmir which currently competes in the Turkish Basketball Super League (BSL). The team was founded by Petkim in 2013 and got promoted to the first division in 2020. Their home arena is Aliağa Belediyesi ENKA Spor Salonu with a capacity of 3,000 seats. The team is sponsored by SOCAR, an oil and gas company in Azerbaijan.

In the 2024–25 season, Petkim Spor will play in a European competition for the first time, when the team entered the Basketball Champions League, after beating Heroes Den Bosch, Cholet and PAOK in qualification rounds.

== History ==
On 29 July 2020 Sigortam.Net İTÜ was removed from the Basketbol Süper Ligi due to financial issues. Instead of them, Petkim Spor were granted a place in the Turkish top-tier league.

== Players ==
=== Current roster ===
Note: Flags indicate national team eligibility at FIBA-sanctioned events. Players may hold other non-FIBA nationalities not displayed.

Petkimspor roster
Players
Coaches

Pos.	No.	Nat.	Name	Ht.	Wt.	Age
SG	0	(United States)	Thomas, Khyri	1.90 m (6 ft 3 in)	95 kg (209 lb)	30 – 8 May 1996
SG	1	(United States)	Cook, Keandre	1.96 m (6 ft 5 in)	85 kg (187 lb)	29 – 1 May 1997
F/C	2	(United States)	Horton, Chris	2.03 m (6 ft 8 in)	102 kg (225 lb)	32 – 29 June 1994
PG	3	(United States)	Abmas, Max	1.80 m (5 ft 11 in)	73 kg (161 lb)	25 – 2 April 2001
PF	5	(Turkey)	Görener, Tibet	2.06 m (6 ft 9 in)	93 kg (205 lb)	24 – 27 July 2002
G	6	(Turkey)	Yılmaz, Ozan	1.93 m (6 ft 4 in)		23 – 17 January 2003
F	7	(Turkey)	Onan, Yiğit	2.08 m (6 ft 10 in)	98 kg (216 lb)	24 – 12 July 2002
SG	11	(Turkey) (Belgium)	Akyazılı, Thomas (C)	1.90 m (6 ft 3 in)		29 – 15 January 1997
F/C	18	(Latvia)	Pasečņiks, Anžejs	2.16 m (7 ft 1 in)	103 kg (227 lb)	30 – 20 December 1995
G	21	(Canada)	Hanlan, Olivier	1.93 m (6 ft 4 in)	86 kg (190 lb)	33 – 15 February 1993
C	55	(Turkey)	Gündüz, Yusuf	2.13 m (7 ft 0 in)	93 kg (205 lb)	22 – 4 June 2004

Head coach

- (Turkey) Orhun Ene

Assistant coach(es)

- (Turkey) Yalçın Küçüközkan
- (Turkey) Rüçhan Tamsöz
- (Turkey) Ibrahım Avci
- (Turkey) Melih Hıdır

Legend

- (C) Team captain
- Injured

- Roster
Updated: November 15, 2026

=== Notable former players ===
Note: Flags indicate national team eligibility at FIBA-sanctioned events. Players may hold other non-FIBA nationalities not displayed.

Criteria

To appear in this section a player must have either:

- Set a club record or won an individual award while at the club
- Played at least one official international match for their national team at any time
- Played at least one official NBA match at any time.

- (Turkey) Ege Arar
- (Turkey) İlkan Karaman
- (Turkey) Cemal Nalga
- (Turkey) Bora Hun Paçun
- (Turkey) Ümit Sonkol
- (Turkey) Okben Ulubay
- (Bosnia and Herzegovina) Kenan Bajramović
- (Bulgaria) Kaloyan Ivanov
- (Canada) Kenny Chery
- (Canada) Philip Scrubb
- (Colombia) Jaime Echenique
- (Croatia) Darko Planinić
- (Germany) Mahir Agva
- (Lithuania) Martynas Sajus
- (Lithuania) Šarūnas Vasiliauskas
- (Latvia) Kristers Zoriks
- (North Macedonia) Kristijan Nikolov
- (Netherlands) Yannick Franke
- (Nigeria) Daniel Utomi
- (New Zealand) Tai Webster
- (Puerto Rico) Gary Browne
- (United States) Damyean Dotson
- (United States) Daniel Hamilton
- (United States) Ian Hummer
- (United States) Josh Selby
- (United States) Khyri Thomas
- (United States) Malcolm Thomas
- (United States) Justin Wright-Foreman

== Head coaches ==
- (Turkey) Şahin Ateşdağlı: 2014–2016
- (Turkey) Burak Gören: 2016–2018
- (Turkey) Okan Çevik: 2018–2019
- (Turkey) Arda Vekiloğlu: 2019–2020
- (Lithuania) Kestutis Kemzura: 2020–2021
- (Turkey) Can Sevim: 2021
- (Turkey) Burak Gören: 2021–2025
- (Turkey) Özhan Çıvgın: 2025–2026
- (Turkey) Orhun Ene: 2026–present

== Season by season ==
Season	Tier	Division	Pos.	Pos.	W–L	Cup Competitions	European Competitions	
2014–15	2	TBL	10th	–	16–18			
2015–16	2	TBL	7th	–	18–19			
2016–17	2	TBL	5th	–	29–10			
2017–18	2	TBL	15th	–	11–23			
2018–19	2	TBL	19th	–	18–14			
2019–20	2	TBL	–^{1}	–	19–5^{1}			
2020–21	1	BSL	14th	–	10–20			
2021–22	1	BSL	13th	–	9–21			
2022–23	1	BSL	12th	–	12–18			
2023–24	1	BSL	7th	QF	15–15	Quarterfinalist		
2024–25	1	BSL	11th		12–18		Champions League	R16
2025–26	1	BSL	13th		9–21		FIBA Europe Cup	QF

^1 Cancelled due to the COVID-19 pandemic in Europe.
