= LNB Pro B MVP =

The LNB Pro B Most Valuable Player (MVP) Award is an annual professional basketball award that is given by the second tier division in France, the LNB Pro B. It is awarded to the best player in a given regular season. The unified award was introduced in the 2014–15 season, as before there were awards for a French MVP and a Foreign MVP.

== Separated awards (1992–2014) ==
LNB Pro B MVP Awards
Year	(France) French Player's MVP	Foreign Player's MVP
1992	(France) Patrick Cham (Levallois)	(United States) Terence Stansbury (Levallois)
1993	(France) Moustapha Sonko (Sceaux)	(United States) Winston Crite (Sceaux)
1994	(France) Bruno Hamm (Strasbourg)	(United States) James Banks (Nancy)
1995	(France) Frédéric Hufnagel (La Rochelle)	(United States) James Banks (Caen)
1996	(France) Karim Gharbi (Hyères Toulon)	(United States) David Booth (Toulouse)
1997	(France) David Condouant (Vichy)	(United States) Geoff Lear (Hyères Toulon)
1998	(France) Jimmy Vérove (Brest)	(United States) Larry Terry (Mulhouse)
1999	(France) Ahmadou Keita (Strasbourg)	(United States) Jarod Stevenson (Strasbourg)
2000	(France) Charles-Henri Grétouce (Bondy)	(United States) Elliot Hatcher (Vichy)
2001	(France) Laurent Cazalon (Roanne)	(Saint Vincent and the Grenadines) Floyd Miller (Hyères Toulon)
2002	(France) Jean-Philippe Tailleman (Golbey-Epinal)	(United States) Rahshon Turner (Vichy)
2003	(France) Cyril Akpomedah (Châlons-en-Champagne)	(United States) Mike Jones (Reims / Saint-Quentin)
2004	(France) David Melody (Clermont-Ferrand)	(Czech Republic) Ondřej Starosta (Saint-Quentin)
2005	(France) Stephen Brun (Brest)	(United States) Tyson Patterson (Brest)
2006	(France) Raphaël Desroses (Angers)	(United States) Cedrick Banks (Besançon)
2007	(France) Joachim Ekanga-Ehawa (Nanterre)	(United States) Jimmal Ball (Vichy)
2008	(France) Adrien Moerman (Nanterre)	(United States) Rashaun Freeman (Nantes)
2009	(France) Jimmal Ball (Paris-Levallois)	(United States) Errick Craven (Clermont)
2010	(France) Moussa Badiane (Aix-les-Bains)	(United States) Teddy Gipson (Pau-Lacq-Orthez)
2011	(France) Philippe da Silva (ALM Évreux)	(United States) Nate Carter (Nanterre)
2012	(France) Joseph Gomis (Limoges)	(United States) Chris Massie (Limoges)
2013	(France) Mam Jaiteh (Boulogne-sur-Mer)	(United States) Jeremiah Wood (Évreux)
2014	(France) Michel Morandais (Châlons-Reims)	(United States) Zachery Peacock (Boulogne-sur-Mer)

== Unified award (2014–present) ==
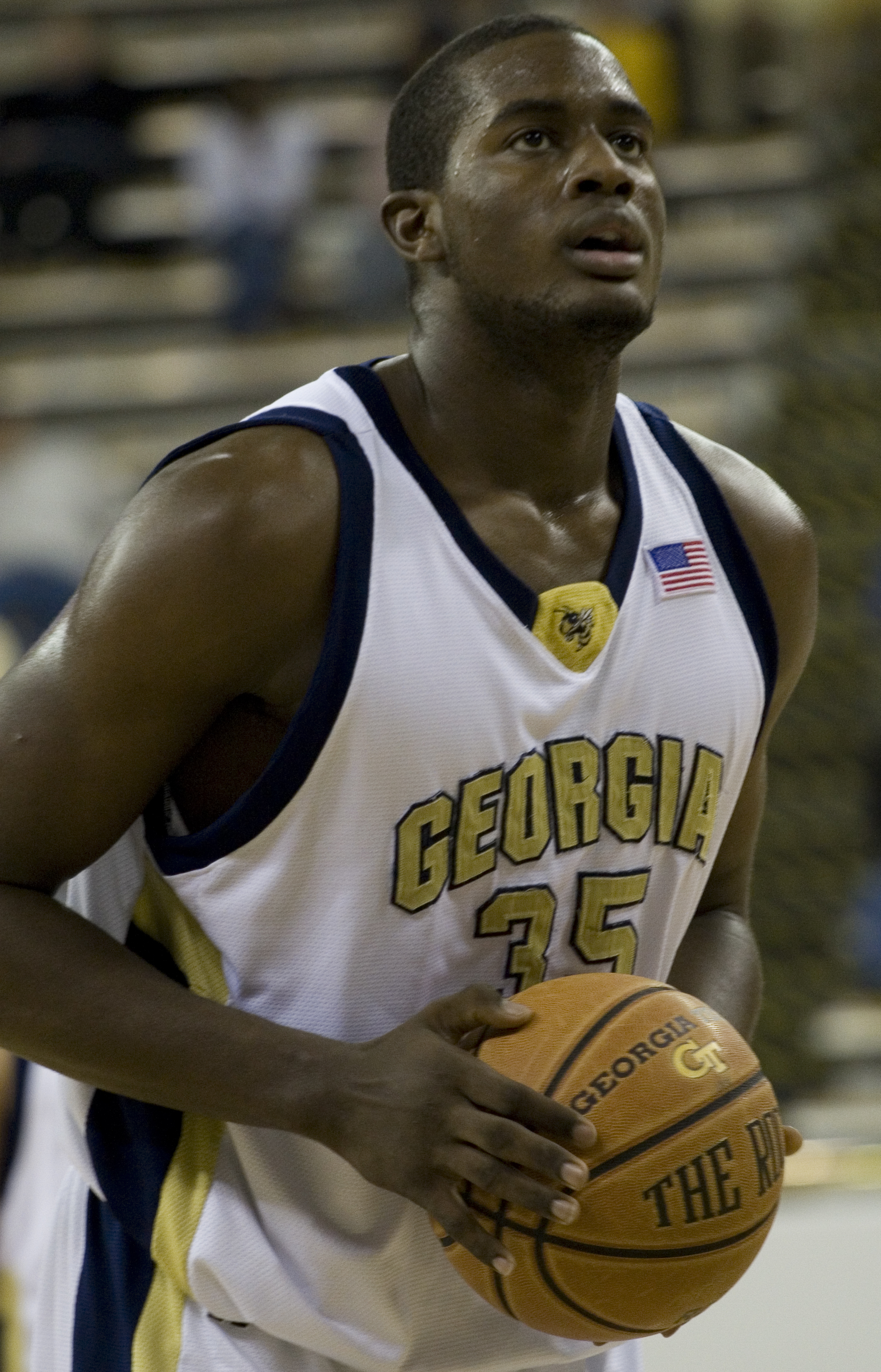
Zachery Peacock won the award in 2017, while leading his team to the Pro B championship.

^	Denotes player who is still active in the Pro B
*	Inducted into the FIBA Hall of Fame
†	Denotes player whose team won championship that year
Player (X)	Denotes the number of times the player has received the award

Season	Player	Position	Nationality	Team	Ref.
2014–15	Davante Gardner	PF	United States	HTV	
2015–16^	Joe Burton	PF/C	United States	ALM Évreux	
2016–17†	Zachery Peacock	PF/C	United States	JL Bourg	
2017–18†	Tyren Johnson	PF	United States	ADA Blois	
2018–19	Brandon Jefferson	PG	United States	Orléans Loiret	
2019–20	Not awarded ^{1}				
2020–21	Parker Jackson-Cartwright	PG	United States	Saint-Quentin	
2021–22	James Batemon III	G	United States	Tours	
2022–23	Mathis Dossou-Yovo	PF/C	France	Saint-Quentin	
2023–24†	Tray Buchanan	PG	USA	Stade Rochelais	
2024–25^	Chris Ledlum	F	USA	Pau-Lacq-Orthez	

^1 There was no awarding in the 2019–20, because the season was cancelled due to the coronavirus pandemic in Europe.
