= LNB Pro B Best Scorer =

The LNB Pro B Best Scorer are the season by season individual scoring leaders of the LNB Pro B (Pro B), the second-tier of the French men's basketball system. The criteria set is that the player must play in a certain number of games wherein he amassed the highest possible average to lead the league in the said statistic.

== LNB Pro B Best Scoring leaders ==
Season	Top Scorer	Team	PPG
1993–94	(United States) Bruce Bowen	Le Havre	28.2
1994–95	(United States) Bruce Bowen (2×)	Évreux	28.8
1995–96	(United States) David Booth	Toulouse Spacer's	31.3
2004–05	(United States) Mario Porter	FC Mulhouse Basket	21.2
2005–06	(United States) Cedrick Banks	Besançon BCD	20.6
2006–07	(United States) Dawan Robinson	Limoges CSP	20.4
2007–08	(United States) Rashaun Freeman	Nantes	19.8
2008–09	(Ivory Coast) (United States) Errick Craven	Stade Clermontois	19.9
2009–10	(United States) Chris Davis	Charleville-Mézières	18.2
2010–11	(Sierra Leone) Moses Sonko	Aix Maurienne	19.3
2011–12	(United States) Jason Siggers	Rouen Métropole	18.5
2012–13	(United States) Wilbert Brown	Aix Maurienne	21.3
2013–14	(United States) Zachery Peacock	Boulogne-sur-Mer	20.0
2014–15	(Cape Verde) Ivan Almeida	Lille Métropole	18.1
2015–16	(United States) Frank Hassell	Boulazac Dordogne	18.4
2016–17	(United States) Zachery Peacock (2×)	JL Bourg	17.8
2017–18	(United States) Amin Stevens	Rouen Métropole	17.9
2018–19	(United States) Lasan Kromah	Rouen Métropole	17.1
2019–20	(United States) Tyren Johnson	ADA Blois	18.4
2020–21	(France) Hugo Besson	Saint-Quentin BB	19.3
2021–22	(France) Stéphane Gombauld	SLUC Nancy	19.5
2022–23	(United States) Tray Boyd	JA Vichy-Clermont	22.5
2023–24	(United States) Robert Turner	Fos-sur-mer	18.4
2024–25	(United States) Chris Ledlum	Pau-Lacq-Orthez	19.6
