= Angelo Tsagarakis =

French basketball player

Personal information
- Born: June 3, 1984 (age 42) Mantes-la-Jolie, France
- Listed height: 6 ft 3 in (1.91 m)
- Listed weight: 200 lb (91 kg)

Career information
- High school: Casa Grande (Petaluma, California)
- College: Oregon State (2003–2007); Cal Poly Pomona (2007–2008)
- NBA draft: 2008: undrafted
- Playing career: 2008–2019
- Position: Shooting guard / point guard
- Number: 9

Career history
- 2008: JL Bourg
- 2008–2009: Paris-Levallois
- 2009–2010: SVBD
- 2010–2012: JL Bourg
- 2012–2013: Champagne Châlons-Reims
- 2013–2015: SOMB
- 2015–2016: Vichy-Clermont
- 2016–2017: Aries Trikala
- 2017–2018: Kymis
- 2018–2019: Ionikos Nikaias

Career highlights
- 2× French 2nd Division champion (2009, 2014); 3× French 2nd Division All-Star (2012–2014); 3× FIBA 3x3 French National Champion (2015, 2016, 2020); French 3x3 National Finals MVP (2020)
Medals
Men's basketball
Representing France
FIBA 3x3 World Cup
Bronze medal – third place	2017 France (Nantes)
Gold medal – first place	2017 France (Nantes)	3-Point shootout contest
FIBA 3x3 Europe Cup
Silver medal – second place	2017 Netherlands (Amsterdam)	3-Point shootout contest
Gold medal – first place	2018 Romania (Bucharest)	3-Point shootout contest

Angelo Constantin Tsagarakis (Greek: Άγγελος Τσαγκαράκης; born June 3, 1984) is a retired French-Greek professional basketball player who played both point guard and shooting guard. Tsagarakis played college basketball at Oregon State University, with the Oregon Beavers, and at Cal Poly Pomona, with the Cal Poly Pomona Broncos.
He is since August 2026 the director of high performance and player development for Maccabi Ironi Ramat Gan BC, one of Israel's top first division professional teams.
From April 2022 to September 2024 he was the head coach of all Greek 3x3 basketball national teams and won two gold medals at the Mediterranean Beach Games in September 2023, the first medals in the history of Greek 3x3 basketball.
Recognized as one of the premier 3x3 players on the international scene, he was a member and leader of the French National Team that competed and brought back the bronze medal at the 2017 FIBA 3x3 World Cup.
While representing France in international competitions between 2017 and 2018, Tsagarakis brought back two long-distance shooting gold medals at the 2017 World Cup in Nantes and the 2018 Europe Cup in Bucharest.
He was also the top FIBA ranked French 3x3 player for the year 2015 and he is still today the 4th all-time leading scorer in the history of the French 3x3 national team.

== French youth levels ==
Tsagarakis was named in 2004, by the French magazine Maxi-Basket, as one of the top three French players of his generation (players born in 1984). He competed at the French Nike Camp several times, and was the MVP in 1999, and an all-star in 1998, 1999, and 2000. He won the under-18 division II French national championship in 2000, with his club team Poissy, while averaging 13 points per game during the tournament's Final Four: He had an 18-point effort in the semifinal against Mulhouse (all in the second-half), to help Poissy overcome a 21-point half-time deficit.

Tsagarakis had one of the most memorable moments in the youth tournament's final four history, when he hit 4 three-point field goals in a span of a minute and thirty seconds, to cut his team's deficit to one point, with 3 minutes left in the game. He carried Poissy to the French National Under-18 Sweet 16 in 2001 and 2002, while averaging above 25 points per game in both seasons. He also helped Poissy to a 12–9 record at the 5th-tier level French National 3 in 2002, while averaging 18 points and 9 assists per game at the age of 17 (he led the team in both scoring and assists). Finally, he took Poissy to the French National Under-15 Elite 8 (Poissy finished 5th in the country) in 1999, while averaging just above 23 points per game.

== High school in the United States ==
Tsagarakis attended his senior year of high school at Casa Grande High School, in Petaluma, California, in 2002–03, after coming to the United States, from France. He led Casa Grande to a 24–5 record, the best mark in school history. He also led Casa to championship victory in both the Sonoma County League (11–1 record), and Conference tournament. He was named team captain by coach Jeremy Russotti, and he averaged 23 points, 4.4 rebounds, and 5.5 assists a game as a senior. He made 100 three-point field goals, shooting 42 percent from beyond the arc, becoming one of only six players in Sonoma county to ever hit the century mark on three-pointers made in a season.

He was a member of the Redwood Empire 600 points scored in a single season list, and was named Sonoma County League MVP. He shared the Santa Rosa Press-Democrat's Player of the Year honors with his Oregon State college teammate, Kyle Jeffers. The website NorCalPreps.com ranked him among the top five players overall, and the best shooter in Northern California. He was named to the San Francisco Chronicle's All-Metro third team. He was the MVP of the Northern California Super 100, and Ygnacio Valley tournaments, and was a McDonald's All-American nominee.

He made a school-record nine three-point field goals, in a 41-point performance against Windsor High School, in only 28 minutes played. He was an honor roll student at Casa Grande, after graduating school with a 3.40 GPA.

== College career ==
=== Oregon State (2003–2007) ===
==== 2003–04 season ====
Tsagarakis hit an Oregon State freshman record of 45 three-point field goals made, on 143 attempts, as a true freshman. He averaged 6.4 points per game off the bench, in 15.7 minutes played per game. He buried six threes (one shy of the school record), en route to 18 points scored versus Willamette University. He also had 18 points scored versus the Washington Huskies, going 5-for-10 on three-pointers, and playing a career-high 26 minutes. He scored 13 points, including eight in a 1:31 stretch in the second half, in an upset win versus the number 14 ranked Arizona Wildcats.

He scored in double-figures eight times during the season, and had 13 games where he made at least two threes. He also played 20-plus minutes five times during the season. He attempted just 27 two-point field goals, connecting on 13. He was named the 2004 French Hoops College Freshman of the Year.

==== 2004–05 season ====
After a promising freshman season, Tsagarakis was forced to remain sidelined the next season, as he red-shirted, due to a shoulder surgery. He suffered a rotator cuff tear, when he dislocated his right shoulder prior to the start of practice in a preseason workout. He had surgery on September 16, 2004, to repair the problem. Tsagarakis had hoped to return to game action by the start of Pac-10 Conference play, but it was decided that a red-shirt year would be the best for him.

==== 2005–06 season ====
Tsagarakis averaged 2.0 points, in 7.8 minutes per game, as a sophomore. He played in 26 games, starting one. He scored a season-high seven points in the opener at Tennessee Technological University. He also scored seven points in an away game against the University of Portland, which included a steal, and a made 30-foot three-pointer at the halftime buzzer. He scored five important points in Oregon State's Pac-10 Tournament first-round comeback win versus Arizona State University. He was a Pac-10 All Academic Honorable Mention. He made first career start against the Washington Huskies.

==== 2006–07 season ====
Tsagarakis averaged 2.8 points, in 9.8 minutes played per game, as a junior. He played in 28 games, starting one. He was named to the Pac-10 All Academic Second Team. He had a 2 to 1 assist-to-turnover ratio on the season, the best on Oregon State's team. He scored 11 points (all in the second half), in 16 minutes played against the number 20 ranked University of Nevada, and he finished the game as Oregon State's leading scorer for that night.

He scored 8 points in 13 minutes played against Mercer University. He also scored 10 points in 20 minutes played against the future Sweet 16 bid team of USC, and finished the game as Oregon State's leading game scorer for the second time on the season. He made at least two three-pointers in a single game five times during the season, with all of them occurring in a seven-game span. He made a three-pointer at the buzzer in an away game against Cal Berkeley, to send the game into overtime.

=== Cal Poly Pomona 2007–08 ===
Tsagarakis was a 2008 All CCAA Conference Second Team selection, a 2008 All CCAA tournament Team selection, and a 2008 CCAA tournament finalist. He averaged 16 points, 3 rebounds, and 3 assists per game during the CCAA tournament. He ranked 10th in all of NCAA Division II college basketball in free throw percentage, at 87.5% (84 made on 96 attempts). He tied the school record for 3-point field goals made in a single season, with 75. He was also named the team's captain by coach Greg Kamansky.

He played in all 28 games, starting 26, and averaged 15.1 points per game, along with 2.5 rebounds, and 2.5 assists per game. He led the team in total assists, with 70 for the season, free throw percentage at 87.5% (84 made on 96 attempts), and 3-point field goal percentage, at 37.5% (75 made on 201 attempts). He shot 42.5% overall from the field for the season (132 made on 311 attempts). He had the game-winning buzzer-beater 3 point made field goal versus Chico State University (1/11/2008, final score 64–61) in the CCAA conference game.

== Professional career ==
=== JL Bourg-en-Bresse (LNB Pro B) 2008 ===
Tsagarakis signed in early May 2008 his first professional contract with the French second-tier division LNB Pro B league regular season runner-up, JL Bourg-en-Bresse. He played a total of 7 games as a medical replacement of Raphaël Desroses, the team’s leading scorer on the season. Angelo helped Bourg-en-Bresse to the Pro B semi-finals as he averaged 10 points and 2 assists in 6 playoff games, while shooting 50% from the field, 44% from three-point land & 100% from the free-throw line (11/11) in only 19 minutes per game on average.

=== Paris Levallois (LNB Pro B) 2008–09 ===
For his first full season as a professional athlete, Tsagarakis helped Paris Levallois to win the 2009 French Pro B regular season championship (28–6 win–loss record), which provided the ball club with the automatic bid for promotion to the LNB Pro A league the next season. In his 4 playoff games, as Paris Levallois reached the Pro B semifinals, Angelo averaged 8.5 points and 1.5 assists, in 17 minutes played per contest. He had a key performance in game 2 of the opening round.: 14 points (4 of 8 shooting), 4 assists, 3 steals, 3 rebounds, and 4 turnovers, in 25 minutes played against Saint-Étienne. He also had some notable performances during the regular season, while helping Paris Levallois to rejoin the French elite professional division: 04/17/2009 @ Antibes: 12 points in 11 minutes -/- 03/17/2009 vs. Lyon-Villeurbanne (ASVEL) - ProA/French Cup's third round: 10 points in 13 minutes -/- 12/19/2008 @ Saint-Quentin: 6 points in 6 minutes -/- 11/25/2008 vs. Boulazac: 11 points in 12 minutes -/- 10/21/2008 @ Quimper: 12 points in 11 minutes. During the regular season, he saw the floor in 28 games, for an average of 3.1 points in 7 minutes.

Dime & Nike Basketball's "Ballers Network" specialized website selected him as the October 2008 player profile of the month. Shortly after the start of the regular season, he was a special guest on the second episode of the "Ballin" radio show, on October 27, 2008 (103.5 FM – Grenoble / www.jump-shot.net).

=== Saint Vallier Basket Drôme (LNB Pro B) 2009–10 ===
Looking for more responsibilities, for his second full season as a professional, Tsagarakis decided to sign for another Pro B, team, Saint Vallier Basket Drôme. He played in all 34 games of the regular season, starting 19. He averaged 8 points, 2.1 rebounds, and 1.4 assists per game, in 21 minutes spent on the court on average, while shooting 34% from 3 point range (58 made on 169 attempts), and 84% from the free-throw line (50 made on 59 attempts). He helped Saint Vallier Basket Drôme to an all-time best 17–17 win–loss record, as they finished one spot shy of earning a playoff seed.

In the early stages of the Pro B regular season, Tsagarakis was invited onto Frédéric Schweickert's "Carrément Basket" radio show on RTL - L'équipe (10/14/2009). He was also named the team's co-captain by head coach Laurent Pluvy.

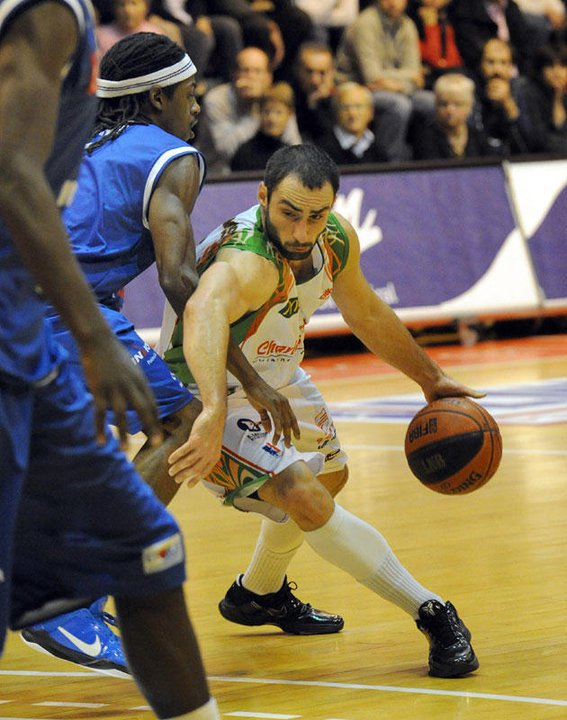
Angelo Tsagarakis - JL Bourg 2010

=== JL Bourg-en-Bresse (LNB Pro B) 2010–11 ===
After a solid season with Saint-Vallier, Tsagarakis decided to sign back with JL Bourg-en-Bresse, his first pro team following his return to France after college. The 2010–11 season, was a season during which he showed consistency within his performance level, particularly in the second half of the season. He started 8 of the last 11 games, averaging over 15 points per game, while shooting 47% from the field and 50% from behind the arc, along with averaging 2.2 rebounds and 2 assists (with an efficiency of 12), in 26 minutes per game. Between the 24th and 30th league games, he posted statistics that provided him with instant recognition as being one of the premier guards in the league; as during that stretch, he averaged 20 points per game, while shooting 50% from the field, with an impressive 54% from 3 point range, on 8 attempts per game, along with 2.7 rebounds and 2.2 assists (efficiency of 16.7) in 30 minutes per game on average. For the season overall, Tsagarakis played in all 34 games of the regular season, starting 11. He averaged 11.5 points, 2 rebounds, and 1.6 assists per game. He also finished second in the league in free-throw percentage, at 88%.

=== JL Bourg-en-Bresse (LNB Pro B) 2011–12 ===
For the second straight season in JL Bourg-en-Bresse, Tsagarakis distinguished himself as one of the best French players in the French 2nd-tier level LNB Pro B league. Considered a potential MVP candidate throughout the season, by specialized websites such as "catch-and-shoot.fr" and "basketactu.com", he suffered 2 broken ribs after a blind hit from Denain's power forward Juwann James in late November 2011.

Before that injury kept him off from the court for 8 weeks, Tsagarakis was averaging 15.3 points per game, making him the second leading scorer among all French players in the league. In the meantime, he was selected by the basketball media as a LNB Pro B All-Star at the season's mid-season.

He finished the year averaging 13.6 points per game, while shooting 45% from the field and 40% from 3 point land, with 2.4 assists, and 1.7 turnovers per game (with an 11 efficiency) in 26 minutes spent on the court per game, which secured his spot on the All-Pro B Team that was selected by "catch-and-shoot.fr" at the end of the season.

=== Champagne Châlons Reims Basket (LNB Pro B) 2012–13 ===
Following up the previous two seasons in the Ain county, Tsagarakis signed with Champagne Châlons Reims Basket, a proven candidate to win a league promotion to the French top-tier level Pro A. He helped the CCRB team make it all the way to the Pro B finals. (Live broadcast of the finals was on the French cable TV channel Sport+ of the Canal+ group). CCRB eventually lost the finals 2–0 against Olympique d'Antibes, but Tsagarakis put up averages of 13 points and 11.5 PIR per game in the series, while shooting at 48.5% from 3 point range.

He finished the regular season as the 9th best French nationality scorer in the league, with an average of 12.2 points per game, which earned him his second straight Pro B All-Star selection by the media. He was later selected at the end of the season to the All-Pro B First Team by the specialized site "Catch & Shoot". He also led the league in free-throw shooting percentage, at 91.5% on the season (65 of 71).

=== Stade Olympique Maritime Boulonnais (LNB Pro B) 2013–14 ===
It was during the 2013–14 season with Stade Olympique Maritime Boulonnais (SOMB) that Tsagarakis played some of the best basketball of his professional career. As the captain of a Boulogne team equipped with only the 9th biggest budget of the league, he finished as the second best French nationality scorer of the competition, with an average of 13.1 points per game, and he led SOMB to a historical 2nd-tier level French LNB Pro B national title. He was named by a consensus of specialized media such as Basket Hebdo, "Catch & Shoot" (now "BeBasket"), "Inside Basket Europe", and Eurobasket.com, as the league's best shooting guard. He was also nominated for the LNB Pro B Best French Player of the Year award, and finished as the runner-up to Michel Morandais.

He played in 44 games, with 36 in the starting lineup, and he averaged 13.1 points, 2 rebounds, and 3 assists, with an 11.1 rating in 30 minutes played per game, while shooting 38.4% from 3 point range (124 out of 324), and 89.3% from the foul line (134 out of 150). Between the 6th and 10th games of the season, Tsagarakis averaged 21 points on 50% shooting, with a 19.8 rating.

He received several accolades:

- He finished in second place in the "Catch & Shoot Trophy" for the best French nationality player of the season.
- He was named to the Best Five JFL (French nationality players) of the league by the specialized site "Inside Basket Europe".
- He was selected to the All-Pro B league team of the season, by the specialized site "Catch & Shoot".
- He was named an LNB Pro B All-Star by "Catch & Shoot", in December 2013.
- He was selected to the Best Five French nationality players of the league by the European specialized site Eurobasket.com.
- He also participated in the LNB All Star Game's 3-Point Contest on December 29, 2013.

=== Stade Olympique Maritime Boulonnais (LNB Pro A) 2014–15 ===
After being the best French nationality scorer and player of his club team's each season since 2010–11, Tsagarakis finally played in the French top-tier level LNB Pro A with SOMB, in the 2014–15 season. His first season in the French national elite level was poorly negotiated by his club, which was relegated back down to the 2nd-tier level LNB Pro B for the next season.

While his team struggled, Tsagarakis made the most of his opportunity, finishing with a season average of 8 points per game, in just 18 minutes per game spent on the floor. He also finished in the top 10 in the league with a 43.5% shooting percentage from 3 point distance, on more than four 3 point shot attempts per game.

He played in 31 games, starting 5. During the last 4 games of the season, Tsagarakis averaged 12.3 points on 46% field goal shooting, with 50% shooting from 3 point range, on more than 6 long range shot attempts per game. He also shot 88% on free throws, and averaged 1.2 rebounds and 2.2 assists in 22 minutes per game during the same stretch, helping SOMB finish the season with 4 straight wins. His per 36 minutes averages (16 points, 3.3 assists and 3 rebonds) placed him among the 10 best French players in the division statistically.

=== J.A Vichy-Clermont Métropole (LNB Pro B) 2015–16 ===
Tsagarakis entered the following 2015–16 season with the LNB Pro B club JA Vichy-Clermont Métropole Basket, a new club with big ambitions, resulting from the merger between the clubs of Jeanne d'Arc Vichy and Stade Clermontois. Being the key element of head coach Fabien Romeyer's system, Tsagarakis achieved an individual season in line with his previous standards of play in the Pro B, as he averaged more than 11 points per game. The team failed to clinch a playoffs spot, yet finished with an honorable .500 record, with 17 wins and 17 losses.

He played in 33 games, with 22 starts, and averaged 11.3 points, 1.8 rebounds, and 1.9 assists, in 26 minutes played per game, while shooting 37.5% from 3 point range (87 of 232), and 88.7% from the free throw line (47 of 53). In 6 Pro B Leaders Cup games played (4 of which he was in the starting 5), his averages rose to 13.3 points, 1 rebound, and 2.5 assists, in 25 minutes per game, while he shot 41.5% from 3 distance and 92.6% from the free throw line (25 of 27).

=== Aries Trikala (Greek Basket League) 2016–2017 ===
In September 2016, Tsagarakis decided to leave France and joined Aries Trikala of the high-profile Greek Basket League, Greece's top-tier level, after having previously gained a Greek passport and Greek citizenship, due to his Greek heritage. With Kelsey Barlow and Tsagarakis as top performers, Trikala, although the smallest budgeted team of the league, exceeded expectations, and flirted with making the league's playoffs throughout the second part of the season, surpassing for the first time in the club's history a total of 10 wins in a single season in the Greek's professional elite level. Tsagarakis made his mark by finishing as the fifth best Greek nationality scorer in the league, with 10 an average of points per game, and also finishing second in the Greek League in 3 point shots made and attempted on the season.

=== Kymis (Greek Basket League) 2017–2018 ===
In August 2017, Tsagarakis followed his head coach from Trikala Aries, Giannis Kastritis, and signed a one-year contract with Lymis He helped the ambitious Kymis club to the best record in its young history in the Greek Basket League, as they finished the regular season tied for 6th place, alongside Lavrio, with a 14 win and 12 loss record. The team henceforth reached the Greek League’s playoffs for the first time, and matched up with Greece’s powerhouse Olympiacos in the first round. They lost game 1 on the road by 3 points, and ended up losing the series 2–0. He finished the season averaging 7 points per game in 20 minutes.

=== Ionikos Nikaias (Greek A2 Basket League) 2018–2019 ===
After helping two of the more recent top-tier level Greek teams to their best historical seasons, Tsagarakis was offered a new challenge by Ionikos Nikaias, a previous team of the Greek League, that was looking to find its way back to the Greek top-tier level, for the first time since 1987. Known as a winner, Tsagarakis signed a two-year deal with the freshly crowned Greek Third Division national champions, with the dual goal of him helping the club to also win the Greek 2nd Division championship in the club’s attempt to earn a long-awaited for league promotion back to Greece's top-tier league. He decided to leave the club before the season ended because of unpaid salaries.

== National team career ==
=== French junior national team ===
Tsagarakis was a member of the Under-18 French National Team in 2001, and he played with the Under-20 French National Team in 2003, averaging 14.3 points per game in the 2004 FIBA Europe Under-20 Championship's qualifier tournament.

=== French 3x3 national team ===
Tsagarakis has been a member and leader of the 3x3 senior French National 3x3 Team since 2012. He competed at the FIBA 3x3 World Tour for the first time in the summer of 2015, and he quickly established himself as one of the premier 3x3 players on the international scene. He first won the 3x3 French Open in Clermont-Ferrand (July 25, 2015), then led his Paris team to a third-place finish in the European Prague Masters (8-9 August 2015), where he was named one of the three most spectacular players of the tournament. He finished the year as the number one ranked French national player in the FIBA 3x3 world individual rankings for the year 2015. Tsagarakis also won the FIBA 3x3 Open de France (held in Orléans on 30 July 2016), for the second time in a row, while preparing with the French national 3x3 team for the FIBA 3x3 Europe Cup, which confirmed once again his top position in the French 3x3 basketball landscape.

He led France to an undefeated campaign in the 2016 FIBA Europe 3x3 Championships Qualifier, which was held in Poitiers, France (July 1–2, 2016), with victories against Estonia, Poland, Israel, Romania, and Italy. He led all scorers with 43 points, which was also the best mark among all players throughout the qualification phase (3 qualifiers total held in Amsterdam, Andorra, and Poitiers), as he finished ahead of the number one ranked 3x3 player in the world, Dušan Bulut, and Spanish ACB League player Álex Llorca.

His greatest accomplishment representing his home country came in the summer of 2017. Tsagarakis finished in the top 3 scorers of the 4th FIBA 3x3 World Cup, in Nantes (France - June, 17th to 21st), with 46 points in 7 games (1 point behind the world's number one ranked Bulut), and led team France to the bronze medal, which was the second world medal in the history of French 3x3 basketball in the senior category. He also distinguished himself by winning the 3 point shootout contest over of Dutch national team player Joey Schelvis and Czech national team Michaela Uhrová, who was MVP of the 2016 World Cup.

In the week preceding the World Cup in Nantes, Tsagarakis was named the MVP of the Big 12 International Tournament that was held in Voiron (France), that was won by the French team. In early July, he also competed with the French team at the 2017 FIBA 3x3 Europe Cup in Amsterdam, finishing 5th, after losing in the quarterfinals against the surprising champion, Latvia. He once again led the team in scoring, with 19 points in 3 games. Tsagarakis also participated in the long distance shootout contest and finished second behind the Russian national team player Alexander Zakharov.

From September 14–16, 2018, Tsagarakis competed once more in the FIBA 3x3 Europe Cup, while representing France. France finished 7th, after losing in the quarterfinals against Russia. The competition was held in Bucharest. Although France failed again to win a medal at the competition, Tsagarakis dominated the 3-point shoot-out competition, and earned himself another gold medal in the competition, after the one he had earlier obtained at the World Cup in Nantes, in 2017. It was the third individual international medal for Tsagarakis in as many events in the contest.
Tsagarakis retired from international play in September 2018 and is still today the 4th all-time leading scorer in the history of the French 3x3 national team with 160 points in 26 caps.

== Streetball career/FIBA 3x3 ==
Over the summer of 2014, Tsagarakis and his streetball team, Hood Mix 2.0, claimed the Quai 54 crown, which is considered to be one of the best international street ball tournaments in the world.

He started competing on the professional FIBA 3x3 stage in 2015 and met immediate success as he finished the year the number 1 French player in the FIBA rankings.
After leading Team Paris to a third-place finish in their first ever FIBA 3x3 Masters in Prague (August 8–9, 2015), Tsagarakis was named one of the three most spectacular players of the tournament.

Tsagarakis also won back to back 3x3 Open de France (French National Championship) in 2015 and 2016 and came back in 2020 to win a third title in three participations while clinching tournament MVP honors in the process.

== Personal life ==
Angelo Tsagarakis is the son of Antonis and Maryse Tsagarakis. He speaks four languages fluently: French (which is his native tongue), English, Spanish, and Greek. He graduated from Oregon State University in 2007, with a Bachelor of Science in International Business, along with a minor in Spanish. He also studied E-Commerce at California State Polytechnic University, Pomona in 2008.

He was an NCAA Student-Athlete academic achievement recipient in 2005, 2006, and 2007. His sister, Catherine Tsagarakis-Ostrowski, is a Lyon, France veterinary school graduate. Tsagarakis is a former high school teammate, and close friend of, former college basketball standout and Olympian with the Nigerian national basketball team, Josh Akognon. His last name is pronounced Tsah-gah-rah-kiss, the initial "T" is not silent.

== Complete statistical table ==
S	T	G	MPM	PPG	3P	3PA	3P%	FT	FTA	FT%	RPG	APG
Under 15 French National Championship, 1998–99	Poissy-Chatou	18	-	23	-	-	--	-	-	--	-	-
Under 18 French National Championship, 1999–00	Poissy-Chatou	22	-	13	-	-	--	-	-	--	-	-
Under 18 French National Championship, 2000–01	Poissy-Chatou	20	-	21.5	-	-	--	-	-	--	-	-
Under 18 French National Championship, 2001–02	Poissy-Yvelines	20	-	25	-	-	--	-	-	--	-	-
French National 3, 2001–02	Poissy-Yvelines	20	31	18	76	168	45%	50	56	89%	3.2	9
High School, 2002–03	Casa Grande High School (CA)	29	27	23	100	238	42%	50	56	89%	4.4	5.5
NCAA Men’s Division I Basketball Championship, 2003–04	Oregon State University	28	15.6	6.4	45	143	31.5%	18	27	66.7%	1.2	0.8
NCAA Men’s Division I Basketball Championship, 2004–05	Oregon State University	DNP	DNP	DNP	DNP	DNP	DNP	DNP	DNP	DNP	DNP	DNP
NCAA Men’s Division I Basketball Championship, 2005–06	Oregon State University	26	7	2	9	46	20%	11	17	64.7%	0.69	0.35
NCAA Men’s Division I Basketball Championship, 2006–07	Oregon State University	28	9.8	2.8	18	65	28%	7	11	63.6%	0.74	0.56
NCAA Men's Division II Basketball Championship, 2007–08	Cal Poly Pomona	28	30	15.1	75	201	37.5%	84	96	87.5%	2.5	2.5
LNB Pro B, 2008	JL Bourg-en-Bresse	7	19	10	11	25	44%	11	11	100%	2	2
LNB Pro B, 2008–09	Paris-Levallois	28	7	3.1	22	68	32.4%	11	14	78.6%	0.5	0.4
LNB Pro B, 2009–10	Saint-Vallier Basket Drôme	34	21	8	58	169	34%	50	59	84%	2.1	1.4
LNB Pro B, 2010–11	JL Bourg-en-Bresse	34	22	11.3	71	174	41%	79	90	88%	1.9	1.6
LNB Pro B, 2011–12	JL Bourg-en-Bresse	22	26	13.6	55	139	39.6%	46	54	85.2%	1.6	2.4
LNB Pro B, 2012–13	Champagne Châlons Reims Basket	34	27	12.2	91	207	44%	65	71	91.5%	2	1.8
LNB Pro B, 2013–14	Stade Olympique Maritime Boulonnais	44	30	13.1	124	324	38.3%	134	150	89.3%	1.9	2.9
LNB Pro A, 2014–15	Stade Olympique Maritime Boulonnais	31	18	8	79	183	43.5%	30	38	79%	1.3	1.7
LNB Pro B, 2015–16	JA Vichy-Clermont	33	26	11.3	87	232	37.5%	47	53	88.7%	1.8	1.9
LNB Pro B, 2015–16	JA Vichy-Clermont (Pro B LC)	6	25	13.3	17	41	41.5%	25	27	92.6%	1	2.5
Greek Basket League, 2016–17	Trikala Aries	22	28	10	51	156	33%	31	34	91.2%	2.7	2.3
Greek Basket League, 2017–18	Kymis	27	20	7	42	120	35%	33	37	89.2%	1.3	1.3
