= Lamine Sambe =

Senegalese basketball player

No. 10 – Champagne Basket
- Position: Point guard
- League: LNB Pro B

Personal information
- Born: 15 December 1989 (age 36) Orléans, France
- Listed height: 1.88 m (6 ft 2 in)
- Listed weight: 84 kg (185 lb)

Career information
- Playing career: 2007–present

Career history
- 2007–2010: Élan Béarnais
- 2010–2011: Antibes Sharks
- 2011–2013: ALM Évreux
- 2013–2015: Cognac CBB
- 2015–2019: Rueil AC
- 2019–2021: Blois
- 2021–2022: Nantes
- 2022–present: Champagne Basket

Mamadou Lamine Sambe (born 15 December 1989) is a Senegalese basketball player. He currently plays for Champagne Basket of the LNB Pro B and Senegal.

== Professional career ==
Sambe played for French LNB Pro A league club Pau-Lacq-Orthez during the 2007–2009 seasons.

== National team career ==
Sambe played with the Senegal national basketball team at the 2019 FIBA Basketball World Cup.
