= Devin Booker (basketball, born 1991) =

American basketball player (born 1991)

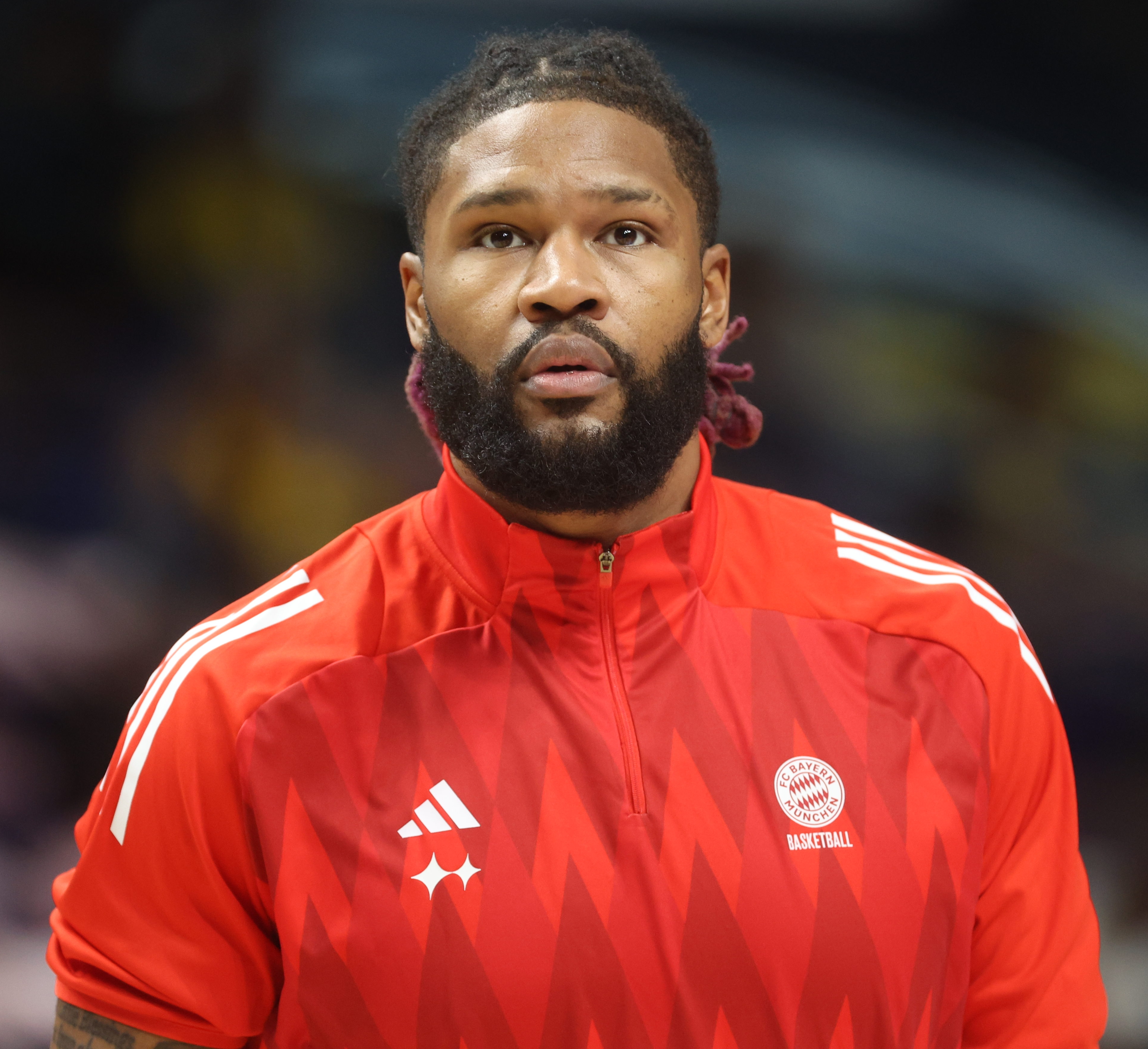
- Booker with Bayern Munich in 2025

No. 31 – Olimpia Milano
- Position: Center / power forward
- League: LBA; EuroLeague

Personal information
- Born: February 28, 1991 (age 35) Whitmire, South Carolina, U.S.
- Listed height: 6 ft 9 in (2.06 m)
- Listed weight: 250 lb (113 kg)

Career information
- High school: Union County (Union, South Carolina)
- College: Clemson (2009–2013)
- NBA draft: 2013: undrafted
- Playing career: 2013–present

Career history
- 2013: SLUC Nancy
- 2013–2015: JL Bourg
- 2015–2016: Élan Chalon
- 2016–2019: Bayern Munich
- 2019–2021: Khimki Moscow
- 2021–2023: Fenerbahçe
- 2023–2025: Bayern Munich
- 2025–present: Olimpia Milano

Career highlights
- All-EuroCup First Team (2018); Turkish Super League champion (2022); 3× German Bundesliga champion (2018, 2019, 2024); Italian Cup winner (2026); 2× German Cup winner (2018, 2024); Italian Supercup winner (2025); LNB Pro A MVP (2016); All-German Bundesliga Second Team (2018); LNB Pro B Finals MVP (2014); German All-Star (2018); Third-team All-ACC (2013)

Devin Rydale Booker (born February 28, 1991) is an American professional basketball player for Olimpia Milano of the Italian Lega Basket Serie A (LBA) and the EuroLeague.

Booker's brother, Trevor, also played college basketball at Clemson and played professionally in the National Basketball Association (NBA). Booker's cousin, Jordan Hill, is a former NBA player as well.

== High school career ==
Booker played high school basketball at Union County High School, in Union, South Carolina.

== College career ==
After high school, Booker played college basketball at Clemson University, with the Clemson Tigers, from 2009 to 2013.

== Professional career ==
Booker began his pro career in France, during the 2013–14 LNB Pro A season, with SLUC Nancy. Later that same year, he moved to the French 2nd Division club JL Bourg. He was named the Finals MVP of the 2013–14 LNB Pro B season.

In 2015, he joined the French 1st Division club Élan Chalon, where he also played in the FIBA Europe Cup, where Chalon finished in third place. In the 2015–16 LNB Pro A season, Booker was named the league's Most Valuable Player.

In 2016, Booker agreed to join the New York Knicks for the NBA Summer League. On July 17, 2016, he signed with Bayern Munich of the BBL in Germany. On July 12, 2017, Booker re-signed with Bayern for the 2017–18 season. He averaged 12.4 points and 5 rebounds per game during the season. Booker re-signed with the team on July 17, 2018.

On July 16, 2019, Russian club Khimki announced that they had signed Booker to a one-year deal. On July 5, 2020, Booker officially renewed his contract with the Russian club Khimki with an option for an additional year, which also competes in the EuroLeague.

On June 16, 2021, Booker signed a two-year deal with Fenerbahçe of the Turkish Basketball Super League.

On July 24, 2023, Booker returned to Bayern Munich, penning a two-year contract.

On July 15, 2025, Booker signed a multi-year contract with Olimpia Milano of the Italian Lega Basket Serie A and the EuroLeague.

== Personal life ==
Booker is the brother of former NBA player Trevor Booker.

== Career statistics ==
Legend
GP	Games played	GS	Games started	MPG	Minutes per game
FG%	Field-goal percentage	3P%	3-point field-goal percentage	FT%	Free-throw percentage
RPG	Rebounds per game	APG	Assists per game	SPG	Steals per game
BPG	Blocks per game	PPG	Points per game	PIR	Performance index rating
**Bold**	Career high

=== EuroLeague ===
*	Led the league

Year	Team	GP	GS	MPG	FG%	3P%	FT%	RPG	APG	SPG	BPG	PPG	PIR
2018–19	Bayern Munich	16	12	20.5	.553	.375	.611	3.4	1.5	.6	.1	8.9	9.8
2019–20	Khimki	28*	**28***	22.3	**.595**	**.459**	**.851**	4.8	1.2	**.8**	.1	11.6	13.9
2020–21	Khimki	15	14	**27.6**	.563	.375	.732	**5.7**	**2.1**	.3	.2	**13.1**	**15.3**
2021–22	Fenerbahçe	29	26	24.3	.568	.368	.762	4.4	1.6	.7	.1	9.1	10.9
2022–23	Fenerbahçe	**31**	12	21.1	.458	.321	.762	3.3	1.1	.4	**.6**	5.8	6.6
2023–24	Bayern Munich	28	28	26.5	.484	.302	.792	5.5	1.2	.4	.1	9.7	10.6
Career		119	92	22.9	.552	.375	.771	4.2	1.4	.6	.3	9.3	10.9

=== EuroCup ===
Year	Team	GP	GS	MPG	FG%	3P%	FT%	RPG	APG	SPG	BPG	PPG	PIR
2016–17	Bayern Munich	17	8	21.4	**.615**	.300	.766	**5.9**	**1.7**	**.9**	.1	12.1	14.6
2017–18	Bayern Munich	**21**	**18**	**21.6**	.598	**.400**	**.859**	5.3	1.5	.7	**.5**	**13.6**	**17.0**
Career		38	26	21.5	.605	.350	.826	5.6	1.6	.8	.3	12.9	15.9

=== FIBA Europe Cup ===
Year	Team	GP	GS	MPG	FG%	3P%	FT%	RPG	APG	SPG	BPG	PPG
2015–16	Élan Chalon	16	13	28.8	.570	.400	.808	7.3	1.6	.9	.7	14.6
Career		16	13	28.8	.570	.400	.808	7.3	1.6	.9	.7	14.6

=== Domestic leagues ===
Year	Team	League	GP	MPG	FG%	3P%	FT%	RPG	APG	SPG	BPG	PPG
2013–14	(France) SLUC Nancy	Pro A	5	5.0	.556	—	—	.8	.2	—	—	2.0
2013–14	(France) JL Bourg	Pro B	30	21.9	.618	—	.723	6.1	.9	.8	.9	12.0
2014–15	(France) JL Bourg	Pro A	33	25.9	.569	.000	.716	6.8	1.3	.7	.4	12.1
2015–16	(France) Élan Chalon	Pro A	34	29.2	.603	.321	.770	7.5	2.7	.7	.6	14.8
2016–17	(Germany) Bayern Munich	BBL	41	19.7	.574	.364	.729	4.7	1.9	.7	.1	9.9
2017–18	(Germany) Bayern Munich	BBL	48	22.3	.628	.375	.759	5.0	2.0	.7	.4	12.4
2018–19	(Germany) Bayern Munich	BBL	25	18.4	.618	.304	.803	4.3	1.7	.8	.1	10.2
2019–20	(Russia) Khimki	VTBUL	18	22.2	.674	.533	.800	4.1	1.8	.6	.2	13.4
2020–21	(Russia) Khimki	VTBUL	8	21.4	.647	.500	.839	5.9	1.2	.9	.1	14.5
2021–22	(Turkey) Fenerbahçe	TBSL	31	24.3	.540	.450	.860	4.0	2.1	.4	.2	9.9
2022–23	(Turkey) Fenerbahçe	TBSL	12	20.9	.492	.316	.667	4.8	1.5	.7	.6	5.8
2023–24	(Germany) Bayern Munich	BBL	33	22.6	.519	.377	.825	5.0	1.5	.4	.3	9.4

=== College ===
Year	Team	GP	GS	MPG	FG%	3P%	FT%	RPG	APG	SPG	BPG	PPG
2009–10	Clemson	32	1	27.3	**.566**	.0	.533	2.9	0.3	.4	.1	4.5
2010–11	Clemson	**34**	**33**	26.9	.475	**.333**	**.734**	5.5	.7	.6	.4	8.1
2011–12	Clemson	31	29	33.4	.482	.217	.698	7.0	**1.3**	**.9**	.9	10.5
2012–13	Clemson	31	31	33.2	.559	.182	.623	**7.5**	.8	.6	**1.1**	**13.1**
Career		128	94	24.1	.518	.275	.658	5.7	.8	.6	.6	9.0
