= 2013–14 LNB Pro B season =

LNB Pro B
- Season: 2013–14
- Duration: 13 September 2013 – 3 June 2014
- Teams: 18

Regular season
- Top seed: SOMB
- Promotion playoffs winner: JL Bourg
- Promoted: SOMB; JL Bourg; Champagne Châlons-Reims (Note: Due to the expansion of the Pro A from 16 to 18 teams, Reims Champagne Basket and SPO Rounen were offered wildcards.); SPO Rouen
- Relegated: Saint-Vallier BD; ~~Orchies~~

Finals
- Champions: SOMB (1st title)

Awards
- Domestic MVP: (France) Michel Morandais
- Foreign MVP: (United States) Zachery Peacock

Statistical leaders
Points	(United States) Zachery Peacock	19.8
Rebounds	(United States) Allen Durham	11.1
Assists	(France) Austen Rowland	6.2
Index Rating	(United States) Allen Durham	25.2

The 2013–14 LNB Pro B season was the 27th season of the Pro B, the France second basketball tier, organised by the LNB. SOMB Boulogne-sur-Mer won the league championship, after finishing first in the regular season with 32 wins. SOMB promoted to the Pro A along with Playoffs winner JL Bourg-en-Bresse and wild card receivers SPO Rouen Reims Champagne.

== Regular season ==
All teams played each other twice, once at home and once away. After this, all teams played all teams in their geographic poule at home and away.

Geographic poules
Poule 1	Poule 2	Poule 3
Aix Maurienne Savoie Basket	SOMB Boulogne-sur-Mer	LMBC Lille
JL Bourg-en-Bresse	ESSM Le Portel Côte d'Opale	ASC Denain Voltaire
Saint-Vallier BD	ALM Évreux Basket	Orchésien BC
Hyères Toulon Var Basket	SPO Rouen Basket	Saint-Quentin Basket-Ball
Fos Ouest Basket Provence	Hermine de Nantes Atlantique	Champagne Châlons-Reims Basket
Boulazac BD	Poitiers Basket 86	Souffelweyersheim BC

Standings

Promotion to Pro A Qualified for Promotion Playoffs Relegated to Nationale I

Pos.	Club	%	GP	W	L	PF	PA
1	SOMB	73%	44	32	12	3575	3287
2	JL Bourg	71%	44	31	13	3381	3136
3	Champagne Châlons-Reims^{WC}	69%	44	30	14	3612	3377
4	Poitiers 86	60%	44	26	18	3352	3280
5	Le Portel	57%	44	25	19	3541	3368
6	ALM Évreux	57%	44	25	19	3283	3156
7	Fos Provence	55%	44	24	20	3336	3311
8	AMSB	55%	44	24	20	3495	3534
9	Hyères-Toulon	50%	44	22	22	3335	3311
10	Saint-Quentin	50%	44	22	22	3487	3539
11	Denain Voltaire	48%	44	21	23	3503	3543
12	Boulazac Dordogne	44%	44	19	25	3403	3376
13	Souffelweyersheim	44%	44	19	25	3105	3209
14	Rouen^{WC}	37%	44	16	28	3216	3412
15	Hermine Nantes	37%	44	16	28	3290	3525
16	Lille Métropole	35%	44	15	29	3387	3520
17	Orchies	35%	44	15	29	3223	3456
18	Saint-Vallier BD	30%	44	13	31	3384	3568

== Promotion playoffs ==
The eight highest placed from the regular season with exception of the champions qualified for the promotion playoffs. In all rounds a best-of-three format was used. JL Bourg promoted to the 2014–15 Pro A season as the winner of the promotion playoffs.

Quarter-finals
2	JL Bourg-en-Bresse	2
9	Hyères-Toulon	0
5	Le Portel	1
6	ALM Évreux	2
3	Châlons-Reims	2
8	Aix-Maurienne Savoie	1
4	Poitiers 86	2
7	Fos-sur-Mer	0

Semi-finals
2	JL Bourg-en-Bresse	2
6	ALM Évreux	1
3	Châlons-Reims	0
3	Poitiers 86	2

Finals
1	JL Bourg-en-Bresse	2
2	Poitiers	0

== Individual awards ==
- Domestic MVP:

(France) Michel Morandais (Châlons-Reims)

- Domestic MVP runner up:

(France) Angelo Tsagarakis (SOMB Boulogne-sur-Mer)

- Foreign MVP:

(United States) Zachery Peacock (SOMB Boulogne-sur-Mer)

- Most Improved Player:

(France) Olivier Romain (Saint-Quentin)

- Coach of the Year:

(France) Germain Castano (SOMB Boulogne-sur-Mer)

- Best Young Player:

(France) Anthony Racine (Saint-Quentin)
