= Bruce Bowen =

American basketball player (born 1971)

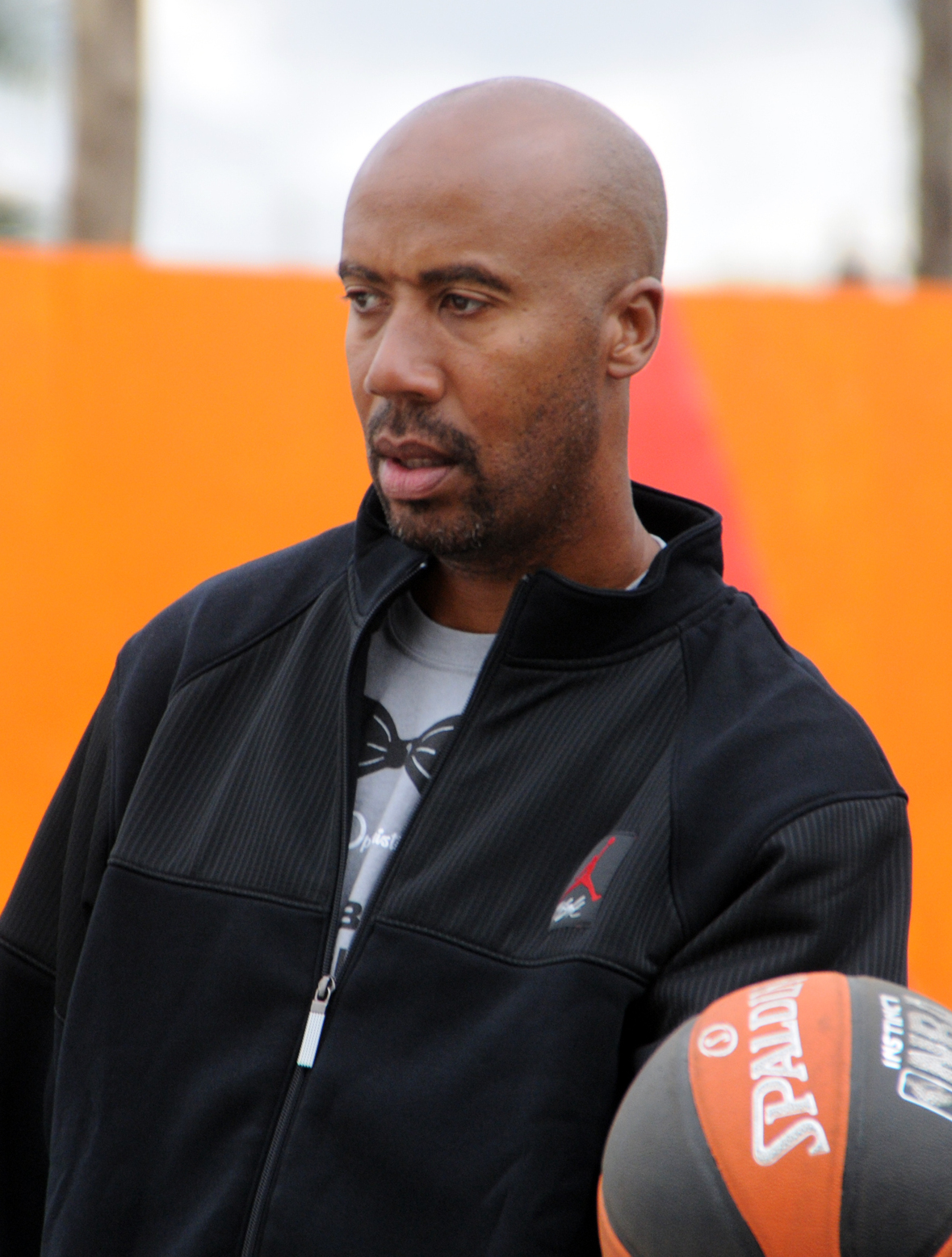
- Bowen in 2014

Personal information
- Born: June 14, 1971 (age 55) Merced, California, U.S.
- Listed height: 6 ft 7 in (2.01 m)
- Listed weight: 200 lb (91 kg)

Career information
- High school: Edison (Fresno, California)
- College: Cal State Fullerton (1989–1993)
- NBA draft: 1993: undrafted
- Playing career: 1993–2009
- Position: Small forward
- Number: 3, 12

Career history
- 1993–1994: Le Havre
- 1994–1995: Évreux
- 1995: Fort Wayne Fury
- 1995–1996: Rockford Lightning
- 1996–1997: Besançon
- 1997: Rockford Lightning
- 1997: Miami Heat
- 1997–1999: Boston Celtics
- 1999–2000: Philadelphia 76ers
- 2000–2001: Miami Heat
- 2001–2009: San Antonio Spurs

Career highlights
- 3× NBA champion (2003, 2005, 2007); 5× NBA All-Defensive First Team (2004–2008); 3× NBA All-Defensive Second Team (2001–2003); No. 12 retired by San Antonio Spurs (Note: In July 2015, Bowen gave permission to LaMarcus Aldridge to wear No. 12.); 2× LNB Pro B Best Scorer (1994, 1995); First team All-Big West (1993); Second team All-Big West (1992)

Career NBA statistics
- Points: 5,290 (6.1 ppg)
- Rebounds: 2,428 (2.8 rpg)
- Assists: 1,089 (1.2 apg)
- Stats at NBA.com
- Stats at Basketball Reference

Bruce Eric Bowen Jr. (born June 14, 1971) is an American former professional basketball player who played in the National Basketball Association (NBA) for 13 seasons, winning three NBA championships with the San Antonio Spurs. An eight-time member of the All-Defensive Team (including five First-Team selections), he is regarded as one of the most feared perimeter "lockdown" defenders of all time and one of the greatest undrafted players in NBA history.

Bowen graduated from Edison High School and Cal State Fullerton. Having gone undrafted in the 1993 NBA draft, he played abroad in France and for Continental Basketball Association's Rockford Lightning before making his NBA debut with the Miami Heat in the 1996–97 season. After stints with the Heat, Boston Celtics and Philadelphia 76ers, Bowen signed with the Spurs in 2001, moving up to the starting line-up and winning championships with the franchise in 2003, 2005, and 2007. At the same time, he was frequently accused of having a "dirty" playstyle and endangering other players.

Off the court, Bowen became an informal ambassador for child obesity awareness.

== Early years ==
Bruce Bowen Jr. was born in Merced, California. He is the son of Bruce Bowen Sr. and Dietra Campbell. Bowen had a problematic childhood growing up in Merced. According to Bowen, his earnings from selling newspapers were taken from him by his father so that his father could buy alcohol. Bowen has also stated that he only saw his father "from time to time". He has asserted that his mother took drugs, and that she once sold the family television to feed her crack cocaine habit. Bowen has an uncle named Darryl who looked out for him as a child; he regards Darryl and his sons as brothers.

Bruce Jr. spent his days playing basketball and eventually became a star at local West Fresno Edison High School. He then played four seasons at Cal State Fullerton, appearing in 101 games, and averaged 11.4 points and 5.8 rebounds per game. After averaging 16.3 points, 6.5 rebounds and 2.3 assists in 36.6 minutes in 27 games as a senior in 1992–93, he was named to the All-Big West Conference First Team. Bowen ranks 12th on the Titans' all-time list in career points (1,155) and is seventh all-time in rebounds (559).

== Professional career ==
=== Early career ===
After finishing his four-year college eligibility, Bowen was eligible for the 1993 NBA draft, but went undrafted. Between 1993 and 1997, Bowen played for five different teams, starting his professional career for the French team of Le Havre in 1993–94.

Bowen played for Évreux during the 1994–95 season.

In 1995–96, Bowen played in the CBA with the Rockford Lightning.

Bowen spent the next season back in France with Besançon.

Bowen returned to the Lightning in February 1997.

=== Miami Heat (1997) ===
Bowen made his NBA debut when he was signed to a ten-day contract by the Miami Heat in March 1997. His output consisted of 1 game, 1 minute and 1 block.

=== Boston Celtics (1997–1999) ===
In the 1997–98 NBA season, Bowen signed with the Boston Celtics. With the Celtics, Bowen slowly established himself in the NBA. In his first full year as an NBA player, he appeared in 61 games (nine of them as starter) with the Celtics, averaging 5.6 points, 2.9 rebounds and 1.43 steals in 21.4 minutes per game, shooting .409 from the field, .339 from three-point land and .623 from the free throw line. The next year was a disappointment for him, as Bowen appeared in only 30 Celtics games, averaging 2.3 points and 1.7 rebounds in 16.5 minutes per game.

=== Philadelphia 76ers (1999–2000) ===
In the 1999–2000 NBA season, Bowen signed with the Philadelphia 76ers.

=== Return to Miami (2000–2001) ===
Bowen was later traded to the Chicago Bulls and immediately waived, then picked up off waivers by the Miami Heat. In that season, he wore jersey #12 instead of #3 and appeared in 69 games, averaging 2.8 points and 1.4 rebounds in 12.7 minutes per game, and scored in double-figures six times. In the following year, Bowen was retained by the Heat. In that year, he had his breakout season. For the first time in his career, he played in all 82 regular-season games, averaged 7.6 points, 3.0 rebounds, 1.6 assists and 1.01 steals in 32.7 minutes per game and set new single-season career-highs in games, points, rebounds, assists, blocks, minutes, field goals made and attempted, three-point goals made and attempted and free throws made and attempted. Bowen logged more minutes (2,685 vs. 2,678), scored more points (623 vs. 606) and hit more threes (103 vs. 54) than he had in his first four seasons combined. Especially, Bowen earned himself a reputation as a defensive stopper. For his strong perimeter defense, he was voted into the All-Defensive Second Team.

=== San Antonio Spurs (2001–2009) ===
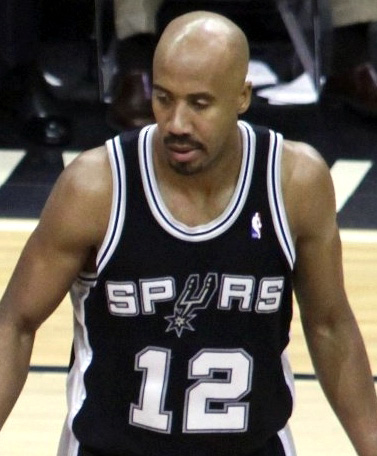
Bowen with the Spurs

==== 2001–03: First championship ====
In the 2001–02 NBA season, Bowen was signed by the San Antonio Spurs. He joined a championship-caliber team, led by veteran Hall-of-Fame center David Robinson and young power forward Tim Duncan, complemented by talented role players like Steve Smith, Malik Rose, Antonio Daniels and point guards Terry Porter and Tony Parker. Bowen established himself as a starter, beginning in each of his 59 regular-season games. In that season, Bowen received his first of several fines: he had to pay $7,500 for kicking Wally Szczerbiak in the face during a March 1, 2002 game. In the 2002 NBA playoffs, Bowen started in all 10 Spurs playoffs games, where the team eventually succumbed to the Los Angeles Lakers. For his feats, Bowen earned himself his second All-Defensive Second Team nomination, although some peers and sports analysts accused him of being a "dirty" defender.

In the next season, Bowen started in all 82 regular-season games for the second time in his career and averaged 7.1 points, 2.9 rebounds and 1.4 assists in 31.3 minutes per game. Again, he was voted into the All-Defensive Second Team and was a member of the Spurs team which won the 2003 NBA Finals. At age 31, the one-time journeyman Bowen had won his first championship ring as a starter. He achieved a rare instance of his 3-point percentage (44%) being higher than his free throw percentage (40%) on 2.8 attempts from three per game and 1.1 FTA, while meeting statistical minimum requirements. It is thought of as possible as a result of Bowen focusing his shot selection on corner threes and rarely straying to shoot anywhere else. In the following three seasons, Bowen established a reputation as one of the best perimeter defenders in the NBA, earning three straight All-Defensive First Team elections and ending as runner-up in the NBA Defensive Player of the Year Award votings twice, losing to post defender Ben Wallace.

==== 2003–04: Back-to-back chase ====
Having established himself as the premier defensive backcourt player, Bowen's effective, but hard-nosed style of play came under discussion. In particular, rival guards Vince Carter and Steve Francis accused him of encroaching into their landing space during their jumpshot. Inside Hoops columnist M.J. Darnell commented: "They're whining because Bruce Bowen has frustrated, upset, hurt or angered them in some way.... He just plays tough, physical defense, does not play with any intent to injure, but isn't afraid to get in someone's grill". Bowen's defensive style failed to help this Spurs squad repeat in the 2004 NBA playoffs, as the team was eventually defeated 4–2 by the Los Angeles Lakers in the Western Conference Semi-Finals.

==== 2005–07: Second and third championships ====
Bowen and the Spurs bounced back and won the NBA title in 2005, defeating the Detroit Pistons. The Spurs could not win back-to-back titles, however, and bowed out 4–3 in a seven-game series against the Dallas Mavericks in the 2006 NBA playoffs. As a testament to his controversial style of play, Bowen picked up a $10,000 NBA fine for kicking Ray Allen in the back during a March 2006 game.

In the 2007 NBA playoffs, the Spurs played against the Phoenix Suns, and Bowen became the center of controversy. His knee contacted Phoenix Suns guard Steve Nash's groin, knocking Nash to the floor. Also in that series, forward–center Amar'e Stoudemire accused Bowen of kicking him during a game, but the NBA reviewed and dismissed the claim. ESPN columnist Bill Simmons commented that Bowen was "a cheap player who's going to seriously hurt someone someday", but Simmons also acknowledged that Bowen "ultimately makes his team better." The Spurs went on to beat the Suns, and Bowen's defense contributed to the Spurs winning their fourth championship in the 2007 NBA Finals.

==== 2007–09: Final years in San Antonio ====
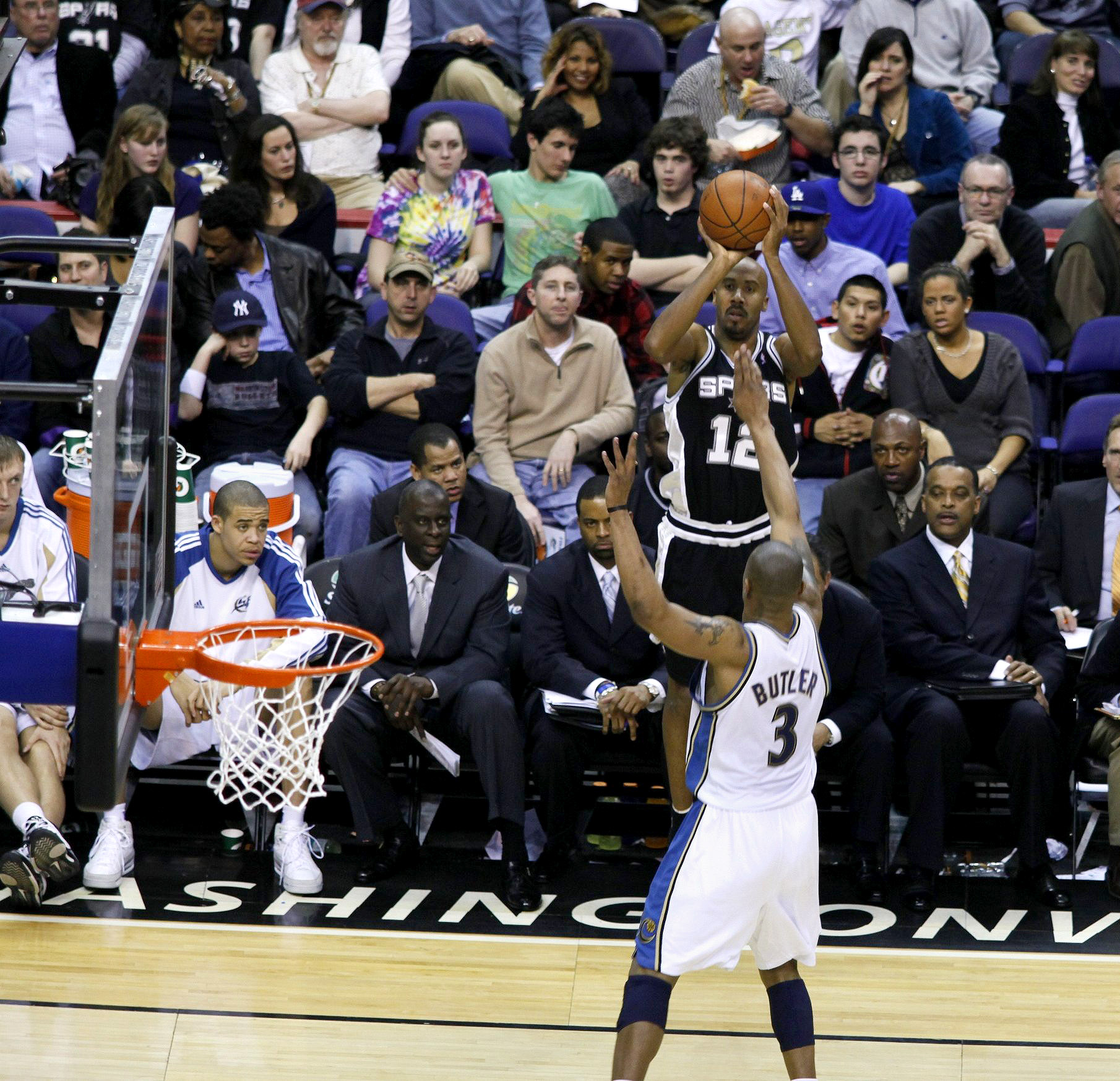
Bowen in 2009

In the 2007–08 NBA season, the now 36-year-old veteran Bowen played and started in 81 of 82 regular season games, earning his fifth straight nomination in the NBA All-Defensive First Team. Ever controversial, Bowen was fined $7,000 and suspended for one game for kicking Chris Paul after Paul had fallen to the floor during a March 12, 2008 game. Bowen finished as the runner-up behind Marcus Camby for the league's defensive player of the year award. In the 2008 NBA playoffs, Bowen was unable to stop Los Angeles Lakers guard Kobe Bryant, who averaged 28.3 points and helped L.A. beat the Spurs in five games. Bowen started in every Spurs regular season and playoff game from 2001 to 2008.

The 2008–09 NBA season was to be Bowen's last with the Spurs. Although he played in 80 regular-season games, he was no longer a starter as was the case in the previous seven San Antonio campaigns. His minutes were also greatly reduced (from 30+ to 18.9 per game), although his shooting numbers remained consistent. The Spurs went into the 2009 NBA playoffs with a 54–28 record and as the third seed. With influential shooting guard Manu Ginóbili out injured, the Spurs got off to a bad start to the series and eventually lost 4–1 against the Dallas Mavericks, bowing out of the playoffs in the first round for the first time since 2000.

On June 23, 2009, Bowen was traded along with Kurt Thomas and Fabricio Oberto to the Milwaukee Bucks for Richard Jefferson. He was released on July 31, 2009, and retired on September 3, 2009.

On March 21, 2012, the Spurs retired Bowen's #12 jersey. Bowen's jersey was the seventh retired by the Spurs. With Bowen's permission, the Spurs reissued the number 12 for free agent LaMarcus Aldridge in 2015.

== National team career ==
In 2006, U.S. coach Mike Krzyzewski invited Bowen to join the U.S. national team, which participated in the 2006 FIBA World Championships in Japan. At 35, he was the oldest player to participate; Krzyzewski said that the team needed a defensive player like Bowen. However, Bowen received little playing time, despite the injuries of fellow swingmen and guards Antawn Jamison, Carmelo Anthony, and Dwyane Wade. Although he participated in several training sessions and training camps, Bowen was eventually cut from the team. He expressed disappointment and said he hoped to make the 2008 Olympics squad, but was not named to the team in the end.

== Player profile ==
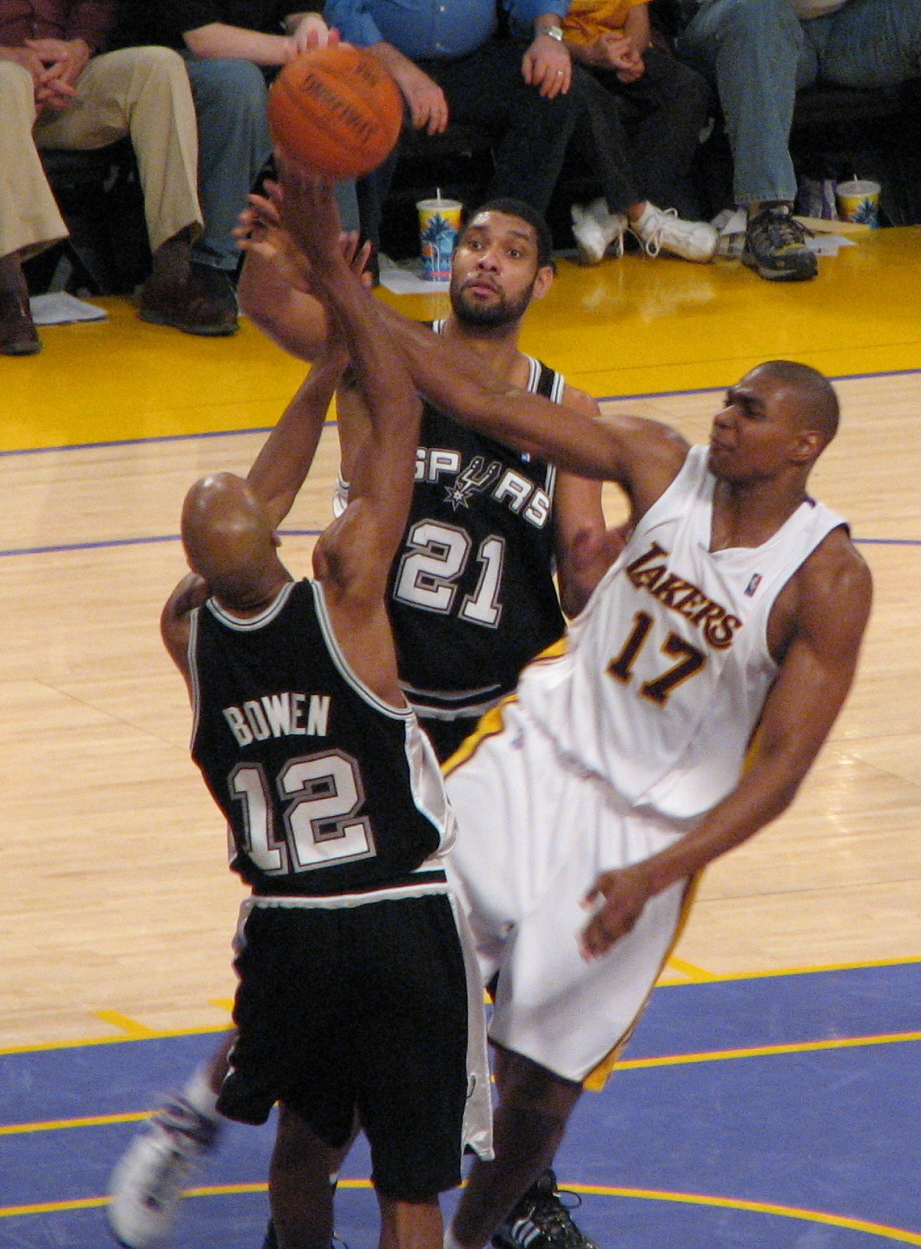
Bowen contesting a layup in a game against the Los Angeles Lakers in 2007

The 6 ft 7 in (2.01 m), 200 lb (91 kg) Bowen played the small forward and occasionally the shooting guard position. He had a reputation for being one of the best perimeter defenders in the NBA, earning himself eight consecutive nominations for the NBA All-Defensive First and Second Teams from 2001 to 2008. From 2005 to 2007, he was second in voting for the NBA Defensive Player of the Year Award, beaten only by centers Ben Wallace (2005 and 2006) and Marcus Camby (2007) who are both post defenders. His accolades for defense were accompanied by persistent allegations of dirty, dangerous play.

Bowen was not known for his offensive production. He was seldom sought on offense, having never attempted more than 600 field goals in an entire 82-game regular season, and his career averages of 6.1 points, 2.8 rebounds and 1.2 assists per game, and .575 free throw shooting were considered mediocre, never earning him nominations for NBA All-Star or All-NBA First or Second Teams. His free throw shooting, in fact, was poor enough that he was at times made the target of the Hack-a-Shaq defense. However, opposing teams could not leave Bowen wide open on offense, because he was also an accurate three-point shooter (.393 career average on 2,082 attempts), particularly from the corner. In addition, despite his age Bowen played 500 consecutive games between February 28, 2002, and March 12, 2008, leading Sports Illustrated to name him in 2007 the "Iron Man" of the NBA.

== Post-playing career ==
Bowen often speaks out against child obesity. In 2004, he started the "GET FIT with Bruce and Buddy" program for children's healthy nutrition and daily sports activities. He runs the Bruce Bowen Foundation, an organization set up to provide scholarships and bursaries. In 2006, he received a college degree in communications from Cal State Fullerton; he had also taken classes at the University of Texas at San Antonio. He has stated that he wants to become a teacher. In 2011, Bowen was inducted into the Fresno County Athletic Hall of Fame.

Bowen worked for ESPN as an NBA analyst after he retired. Bowen spent the 2017–18 season as a color analyst for Fox Sports West television broadcasts of the Los Angeles Clippers' games. He was relieved of his duties after making comments critical of Kawhi Leonard, a free agent and trade target of the Clippers.

In April 2019, Bowen was hired as boys' basketball coach at Cornerstone Christian School in San Antonio.

== Personal life ==
Bowen regards Robert and Sandra Thrash, a Los Angeles couple that he met in church during his college years, as his adoptive parents.

In 2004, Bowen married Yardley Barbon, a Miami native of Cuban descent, and the couple had two sons. The two divorced in 2012.

In 2006, he received a college degree in communications from Cal State Fullerton; he had also taken classes at the University of Texas at San Antonio.

== NBA career statistics ==
Legend
GP	Games played	GS	Games started	MPG	Minutes per game
FG%	Field goal percentage	3P%	3-point field goal percentage	FT%	Free throw percentage
RPG	Rebounds per game	APG	Assists per game	SPG	Steals per game
BPG	Blocks per game	PPG	Points per game	**Bold**	Career high
†	Won an NBA championship	*	Led the league

=== Regular season ===
Year	Team	GP	GS	MPG	FG%	3P%	FT%	RPG	APG	SPG	BPG	PPG
1996–97	Miami	1	0	1.0	.000	.000	.000	.0	.0	.0	**1.0**	.0
1997–98	Boston	61	9	21.4	.409	.339	.623	2.9	1.3	**1.4**	.5	5.6
1998–99	Boston	30	1	16.5	.280	.269	.458	1.7	.9	.7	.3	2.3
1999–00	Philadelphia	42	0	7.4	.356	**.500**	.500	.9	.4	.2	.1	1.4
1999–00	Miami	27	2	21.0	.380	.464	.613	2.2	.7	.5	.4	5.1
2000–01	Miami	**82**	72	32.7	.363	.336	.609	3.0	**1.6**	1.0	.6	7.6
2001–02	San Antonio	59	59	28.8	.389	.378	.479	2.7	1.5	1.0	.4	7.0
2002–03†	San Antonio	**82**	**82***	31.3	**.466**	.441*	.404	2.9	1.4	.8	.5	7.1
2003–04	San Antonio	**82**	**82**	32.0	.420	.363	.579	3.1	1.4	1.0	.4	6.9
2004–05†	San Antonio	**82**	**82***	32.0	.420	.403	.634	3.5	1.5	.7	.5	**8.2**
2005–06	San Antonio	**82***	**82***	**33.6**	.433	.424	.607	**3.9**	1.5	1.0	.4	7.5
2006–07†	San Antonio	**82***	**82***	30.0	.405	.384	.589	2.7	1.4	.8	.3	6.2
2007–08	San Antonio	81	81	30.2	.407	.419	**.652**	2.9	1.1	.7	.3	6.0
2008–09	San Antonio	80	10	18.9	.422	.429	.538	1.8	.5	.4	.2	2.7
Career		873	644	27.6	.409	.393	.575	2.8	1.2	.8	.3	6.1

=== Playoffs ===
Year	Team	GP	GS	MPG	FG%	3P%	FT%	RPG	APG	SPG	BPG	PPG
2000	Miami	10	0	15.7	.370	.227	.625	1.0	.8	.7	.4	3.5
2001	Miami	3	3	19.3	.313	.250	.000	.7	.7	.7	**.7**	4.0
2002	San Antonio	10	10	34.5	.410	.440	.500	3.3	1.4	1.1	**.7**	6.8
2003†	San Antonio	**24**	**24**	31.3	.372	.438	.548	2.9	**1.6**	.8	**.7**	**6.9**
2004	San Antonio	10	10	29.8	.365	.379	.231	2.9	1.0	.4	.3	6.0
2005†	San Antonio	23	23	**35.4**	.359	.433	.647	2.9	**1.6**	.5	.6	5.7
2006	San Antonio	13	13	34.0	.525	.500	.500	2.2	1.2	.9	.6	6.2
2007†	San Antonio	20	20	34.5	.395	.446	.500	**4.1**	1.3	**1.4**	.2	6.5
2008	San Antonio	17	17	29.9	.398	.407	.727	1.9	1.4	.6	.3	6.1
2009	San Antonio	5	2	26.0	**.538**	**.556**	**1.000**	3.0	.6	.6	.0	4.2
Career		135	122	31.0	.394	.422	.553	2.7	1.3	.8	.5	6.0

== See also ==
- List of National Basketball Association career playoff 3-point scoring leaders
