= Eddie Lucas =

American basketball player (born 1975)

Personal information
- Born: July 14, 1975 (age 51) Groton, Connecticut, U.S.
- Listed height: 6 ft 6 in (1.98 m)
- Listed weight: 200 lb (91 kg)

Career information
- High school: Redlands (Redlands, California)
- College: Navy (1995–1996); Virginia Tech (1997–1999)
- NBA draft: 1999: 2nd round, 58th overall pick
- Drafted by: Utah Jazz
- Playing career: 2000–2002
- Position: Shooting guard

Career history
- 2000: Libertad de Sunchales
- 2000: Hermine de Nantes Atlantique
- 2000: Spartak Saint Petersburg
- 2001–2002: Unia Tarnów
- 2001–2002: Bnei Herzliya/Bnei HaSharon
- Stats at Basketball Reference

Edward Howard Lucas (born July 14, 1975) is an American former professional basketball player and current production manager for Highland Construction in Fayetteville NC

Lucas was taken with the last pick of the 1999 NBA draft by the Utah Jazz. He was not offered a spot on the team, and spent three seasons playing for professional teams in Argentina, France, Russia, Israel, and Poland.

== Early life and college ==
In his senior year at Redlands High School in Redlands, California, he was named the team's Most Valuable Player and averaged 20.2 points and was named to the 1A All State team. Lucas started his college career at the United States Naval Academy where he earned All League Patriot Honors in his sophomore year. After transferring to Virginia Tech, Lucas lead the Hokies in scoring at 15.1 points per game in his senior season. At Virginia Tech, Lucas majored in civil engineering.

== Basketball career ==
In the 1999 NBA draft, Lucas was the 58th and final overall pick, selected by the Utah Jazz. However, Lucas never played in the NBA. In addition, the United States Basketball League team Pennsylvania ValleyDawgs drafted Lucas in the fifth round of the 1999 USBL Draft. The Sioux Falls Skyforce cut Lucas before the 1999–2000 Continental Basketball Association season.

In January 2000, Lucas signed with the Argentine team Libertad de Sunchales and signed with the French team Hermine de Nantes Atlantique the following month. With Nantes, Lucas averaged 18.7 points and 3.9 rebounds per game on 51% shooting. Later in 2000, Lucas joined Russian team BC Spartak Saint Petersburg, then the Israeli Bnei Herzliya (later Bnei HaSharon) in January 2001 and would leave the team in 2002.

== Post-basketball career ==
After retiring from basketball, Lucas and former American football player Chris James founded Interactive Drills, an athletic training company. Lucas also earned a master's degree in Civil and Environmental Engineering with a specialty in Construction Management from Virginia Tech. Since 2011, Lucas has lived in Fayetteville, North Carolina.
