= 2005 NBA Finals =

2005 basketball championship series

Team	Coach	Wins
San Antonio Spurs	Gregg Popovich	4
Detroit Pistons	Larry Brown	3
- Dates: June 9–23
- MVP: Tim Duncan (San Antonio Spurs)
- Hall of Famers: Spurs: Tim Duncan (2020); Manu Ginóbili (2022); Tony Parker (2023); Pistons: Chauncey Billups (2024); Ben Wallace (2021); Coaches: Larry Brown (2002); Gregg Popovich (2023); Officials: Dick Bavetta (2015); Danny Crawford (2025)
- Eastern finals: Pistons defeated Heat, 4–3
- Western finals: Spurs defeated Suns, 4–1

The 2005 NBA Finals was the championship series of the National Basketball Association's (NBA) 2004–05 season, and the culmination of the season's playoffs. The Western Conference champion San Antonio Spurs played the Eastern Conference champion Detroit Pistons for the title, with the Spurs holding home court advantage and the Pistons as defending champions. The series was played under a best-of-seven format (unlike the previous three rounds, the team with home court advantage hosted games one, two, six, and seven if all were necessary). It also marked the Pistons' first NBA Finals loss since 1988.

The Spurs won the series four games to three in the first NBA Finals to go to a Game 7 since 1994. The games were broadcast on ABC, with Al Michaels, and Hubie Brown commentating. National radio coverage was provided by ESPN Radio through announcers Jim Durham, and Dr. Jack Ramsay.

== Background ==
This series was not only the first matchup of the previous two NBA champions since the 1987 Finals (Lakers d. Celtics, 4–2), it was a match up of the two premier defensive teams of that era: from the 2002–03 season to the 2004–05 season, the Spurs and Pistons routinely finished in the top three in Points Allowed: in 2003, Detroit was #1, and San Antonio #3; in 2004, the teams finished in a tie for the #1 spot; in 2005, the Spurs were #1 and the Pistons were #2. The Spurs were considered capable of playing at a faster pace, as evidenced by their convincing win against the high-scoring Phoenix Suns during the Western Conference finals. However, both teams performed exceptionally well when scoring over 100 points (Detroit was 22–3, San Antonio was 28–2).

Going into the 2005 Finals, the Spurs had won two championships (1999 and 2003), while Detroit had three (1989, 1990, and 2004). The 2004 Championship was considered a major upset by some sportswriters because of the Lakers' big name talent. Others saw the result as fully legitimate, pointing out that Detroit's defense outplayed the Lakers' offense. Further, the balanced Detroit offense proved especially difficult to deal with when Karl Malone's injured knee left the Lakers without a reliable presence to slow down the Pistons' Rasheed Wallace. Many thought that a contributing factor to the Lakers' loss was the well-publicized tension between superstars Shaquille O'Neal and Kobe Bryant.

Both the Spurs and the Pistons were ranked number two in their respective conferences, with the Phoenix Suns ranked number one in the West and the Miami Heat ranked number one in the East.

Sportswriters all across the country generally considered this one of the few too-close-to-call series to occur. Most picked the series to go to six or seven games.

The Spurs breezed through the playoffs with relative ease, compared to the Pistons. They defeated the Nuggets 4–1 to open the playoffs, winning four straight after losing the home opener. They then defeated the SuperSonics within six games the following series. Phoenix was expected by many to put up a challenge, but the Spurs won the series easily, four games to one.

The Pistons had a slightly tougher road back to the Finals. The opening round was a fairly easy five-game victory over Philadelphia. Next, the Pistons faced the Indiana Pacers, one of the NBA's most resilient teams. Indiana was expected by most experts to falter and miss the playoffs after the Pacers–Pistons brawl; however, led by retiring Pacers legend Reggie Miller, the Pacers still made the playoffs and unexpectedly won their first-round series against the Atlantic Division champion Boston Celtics. The Pacers mounted a formidable challenge but after a Game Six loss, Reggie Miller's storied 18-year career was over. Detroit's next opponent was the East #1 seed Miami, led by Dwyane Wade and Shaquille O'Neal. After winning Game One, the Pistons fell 2–1 after three games and 3–2 after five games. By winning Game Six on their home court, the Pistons forced a Game Seven. In Game Seven, Detroit overcame the odds to beat the Heat at American Airlines Arena, and thus advanced to the NBA Finals for the second straight year.

=== Road to the Finals ===
San Antonio Spurs (Western Conference champion)		Detroit Pistons (Eastern Conference champion)
# / Western Conference; # / Team / W / L / PCT / GB; 1 / z-Phoenix Suns / 62 / 20 / .756 / —; 2 / y-San Antonio Spurs / 59 / 23 / .720 / 3; 3 / y-Seattle SuperSonics / 52 / 30 / .634 / 10; 4 / x-Dallas Mavericks / 58 / 24 / .707 / 4; 5 / x-Houston Rockets / 51 / 31 / .622 / 11; 6 / x-Sacramento Kings / 50 / 32 / .610 / 12; 7 / x-Denver Nuggets / 49 / 33 / .598 / 13; 8 / x-Memphis Grizzlies / 45 / 37 / .549 / 17; 9 / e-Minnesota Timberwolves / 44 / 38 / .537 / 18; 10 / e-Los Angeles Clippers / 37 / 45 / .451 / 25; 11 / e-Los Angeles Lakers / 34 / 48 / .415 / 28; 12 / e-Golden State Warriors / 34 / 48 / .415 / 28; 13 / e-Portland Trail Blazers / 27 / 55 / .329 / 35; 14 / e-Utah Jazz / 26 / 56 / .317 / 36; 15 / e-New Orleans Hornets / 18 / 64 / .220 / 44; 2nd seed in the West, 2nd best league record	Regular season	Eastern Conference: # / Team / W / L / PCT / GB; 1 / c-Miami Heat / 59 / 23 / .720 / –; 2 / y-Detroit Pistons / 54 / 28 / .659 / 5; 3 / y-Boston Celtics / 45 / 37 / .549 / 14; 4 / x-Chicago Bulls / 47 / 35 / .573 / 12; 5 / x-Washington Wizards / 45 / 37 / .549 / 14; 6 / x-Indiana Pacers / 44 / 38 / .537 / 15; 7 / x-Philadelphia 76ers / 43 / 39 / .524 / 16; 8 / x-New Jersey Nets / 42 / 40 / .512 / 17; 9 / e-Cleveland Cavaliers / 42 / 40 / .512 / 17; 10 / e-Orlando Magic / 36 / 46 / .439 / 23; 11 / e-New York Knicks / 33 / 49 / .402 / 26; 12 / e-Toronto Raptors / 33 / 49 / .402 / 26; 13 / e-Milwaukee Bucks / 30 / 52 / .366 / 29; 14 / e-Charlotte Bobcats / 18 / 64 / .220 / 41; 15 / e-Atlanta Hawks / 13 / 69 / .159 / 46; 2nd seed in the East, 5th best league record
Defeated the (7) Denver Nuggets, 4–1	First round	Defeated the (7) Philadelphia 76ers, 4–1
Defeated the (3) Seattle SuperSonics, 4–2	Conference semifinals	Defeated the (6) Indiana Pacers, 4–2
Defeated the (1) Phoenix Suns, 4–1	Conference finals	Defeated the (1) Miami Heat, 4–3

=== Regular season series ===
Both teams split the two meetings, each won by the home team:

December 3, 2004

Detroit Pistons 77, San Antonio Spurs 80

SBC Center, San Antonio, Texas

March 20, 2005

San Antonio Spurs 101, Detroit Pistons 110

The Palace of Auburn Hills, Auburn Hills, Michigan

== Rosters ==
=== San Antonio Spurs ===
2004–05 San Antonio Spurs roster
Players

Pos.	No.	Player	Height	Weight	DOB	From
SG	17	Brent Barry	6 ft 6 in (1.98 m)	185 lb (84 kg)	1971–12–31	Oregon State
SF	12	Bruce Bowen	6 ft 7 in (2.01 m)	185 lb (84 kg)	1971–06–14	Cal State Fullerton
SG	23	Devin Brown	6 ft 5 in (1.96 m)	220 lb (100 kg)	1978–12–30	Texas–San Antonio
PF	21	Tim Duncan	6 ft 11 in (2.11 m)	250 lb (113 kg)	1976–04–25	Wake Forest
SG	20	Manu Ginóbili	6 ft 6 in (1.98 m)	205 lb (93 kg)	1977–07–28	Argentina
PF	5	Robert Horry	6 ft 9 in (2.06 m)	220 lb (100 kg)	1970–08–25	Alabama
SF	43	Linton Johnson	6 ft 8 in (2.03 m)	205 lb (93 kg)	1980–06–13	Tulane
PF	4	Sean Marks	6 ft 10 in (2.08 m)	250 lb (113 kg)	1975–08–23	California
PF	34	Tony Massenburg	6 ft 9 in (2.06 m)	220 lb (100 kg)	1967–07–31	Maryland
C	2	Nazr Mohammed	6 ft 10 in (2.08 m)	221 lb (100 kg)	1977–09–05	Kentucky
C	8	Radoslav Nesterović	7 ft 0 in (2.13 m)	248 lb (112 kg)	1976–05–30	Slovenia
PG	9	Tony Parker	6 ft 2 in (1.88 m)	185 lb (84 kg)	1982–05–17	France
SF	3	Glenn Robinson	6 ft 7 in (2.01 m)	225 lb (102 kg)	1973–01–10	Purdue
PG	14	Beno Udrih	6 ft 3 in (1.91 m)	205 lb (93 kg)	1982–05–03	Slovenia
PG	11	Mike Wilks	5 ft 10 in (1.78 m)	185 lb (84 kg)	1979–05–07	Rice

Coaches
Head coach
- Gregg Popovich
Assistant(s)
- Brett Brown
- Mike Budenholzer
- P. J. Carlesimo
- Don Newman

Legend
- (DP) Unsigned draft pick
- (FA) Free agent
- (S) Suspended
- (DL) On assignment to D-League affiliate
- Injured

=== Detroit Pistons ===
2004–05 Detroit Pistons roster
Players

Pos.	No.	Player	Height	Weight	DOB	From
PG	30	Carlos Arroyo	6 ft 2 in (1.88 m)	202 lb (92 kg)	1979–07–30	FIU
PG	1	Chauncey Billups	6 ft 3 in (1.91 m)	202 lb (92 kg)	1976–09–25	Colorado
C	41	Elden Campbell	6 ft 11 in (2.11 m)	215 lb (98 kg)	1968–07–23	Clemson
SG	20	Carlos Delfino	6 ft 6 in (1.98 m)	230 lb (104 kg)	1982–08–29	Argentina
SF	12	Ronald Dupree	6 ft 7 in (2.01 m)	209 lb (95 kg)	1981–01–26	LSU
SF	8	Darvin Ham	6 ft 7 in (2.01 m)	220 lb (100 kg)	1973–07–23	Texas Tech
SG	32	Richard Hamilton	6 ft 6 in (1.98 m)	185 lb (84 kg)	1978–02–14	Connecticut
SG	10	Lindsey Hunter	6 ft 2 in (1.88 m)	170 lb (77 kg)	1970–12–03	Jackson State
PG	5	Horace Jenkins	6 ft 1 in (1.85 m)	180 lb (82 kg)	1974–10–14	William Paterson
PF	24	Antonio McDyess	6 ft 9 in (2.06 m)	220 lb (100 kg)	1974–09–07	Alabama
C	31	Darko Miličić	7 ft 0 in (2.13 m)	250 lb (113 kg)	1985–06–20	Serbia
SF	22	Tayshaun Prince	6 ft 9 in (2.06 m)	212 lb (96 kg)	1980–02–28	Kentucky
C	3	Ben Wallace	6 ft 9 in (2.06 m)	240 lb (109 kg)	1974–09–10	Virginia Union
PF	36	Rasheed Wallace	6 ft 10 in (2.08 m)	225 lb (102 kg)	1974–09–17	North Carolina

Coaches
Head coach
- Larry Brown
Assistant(s)
- Phil Ford
- Dave Hanners
- Gar Heard
- Igor Kokoškov
- Pat Sullivan

Legend
- (DP) Unsigned draft pick
- (FA) Free agent
- (S) Suspended
- (DL) On assignment to D-League affiliate
- Injured

== Series summary ==
Game	Date	Road team	Result	Home team
Game 1	June 9	Detroit Pistons	69–84 (0–1)	San Antonio Spurs
Game 2	June 12	Detroit Pistons	76–97 (0–2)	San Antonio Spurs
Game 3	June 14	San Antonio Spurs	79–96 (2–1)	Detroit Pistons
Game 4	June 16	San Antonio Spurs	71–102 (2–2)	Detroit Pistons
Game 5	June 19	San Antonio Spurs	96–95 (OT) (3–2)	Detroit Pistons
Game 6	June 21	Detroit Pistons	95–86 (3–3)	San Antonio Spurs
Game 7	June 23	Detroit Pistons	74–81 (4–3)	San Antonio Spurs

== Features ==
This was the first NBA Finals to have the sticker version of the Larry O'Brien Trophy adorn the center court (team logo still visible in the middle), with the NBA Finals wordmark logo on opposite ends of the court. This remained in effect until the 2009 NBA Finals; the position of the O'Brien trophy was modified for the 2007 NBA Finals.

== Game summaries ==
All times are in Eastern Daylight Time (UTC−4). If the venue is located in a different time zone, the local time is also given.

=== Game 1 ===
ABC

June 9
9:00 pm (8:00 pm CDT)

Recap at the Wayback Machine (archived March 16, 2009)

Detroit Pistons 69, San Antonio Spurs 84
Scoring by quarter: 20–17, 17–18, 14–20, 18–29
Pts: Chauncey Billups 25; Rebs: Ben Wallace 8 Asts: Chauncey Billups 6	Pts: Manu Ginóbili 26; Rebs: Tim Duncan 17; Asts: Horry, Parker 3 each
San Antonio leads series, 1–0

SBC Center, San Antonio, Texas
Attendance: 18,797
Referees:
- No. 29 Steve Javie
- No. 10 Ron Garretson
- No. 24 Mike Callahan

Manu Ginóbili was the star of Game 1, turning in a virtuoso performance in the fourth quarter to lead the Spurs to victory. Ginobili scored 15 of his 26 points in the fourth quarter to complement a huge game by Tim Duncan (24 points, 17 rebounds).

Ginobili, who in the previous summer led Argentina in points and assists en route to Olympic gold, took over in the final period. He scored eight points in a decisive 12–2 surge that gave the Spurs a 67–55 lead, then throttled a push by the Pistons with a swooping dunk, 3-pointer and running hook for an 81–67 advantage with less than two minutes to go.

Having been idle for a week, the Spurs opened the game in lackluster fashion – in the first eight minutes the Spurs trailed 19–7 – but were able to fight back and stabilize the game. It may have happened that Detroit's more recent play led to fourth quarter fatigue which enabled the Spurs' strong fourth quarter; in any case, the Spurs prevailed in the first contest.

=== Game 2 ===
ABC

June 12
9:00 pm (8:00 pm CDT)

Recap at the Wayback Machine (archived February 19, 2009)

Detroit Pistons 76, San Antonio Spurs 97
Scoring by quarter: 19–30, 23–28, 21–21, 13–18
Pts: Antonio McDyess 15; Rebs: Ben Wallace, Rasheed Wallace 8 each Asts: Rasheed Wallace 4	Pts: Manu Ginóbili 27; Rebs: Tim Duncan 11; Asts: Manu Ginóbili 7
San Antonio leads series, 2–0

SBC Center, San Antonio, Texas
Attendance: 18,797
Referees:
- No. 7 Bernie Fryer
- No. 43 Dan Crawford
- No. 35 Jack Nies

The resilient Detroit Pistons were expected to bounce back from their fourth-quarter letdown in Game 1. Exactly the opposite occurred. From the opening tip, Game 2 was all San Antonio as the Spurs got out to a quick lead and never looked back.

The Spurs took advantage of Detroit's uncharacteristic mistakes throughout the night, which included missing nine shots from inside four feet from the basket. While the Pistons went cold (0–6) from behind the three-point line, the Spurs made 11 3-pointers, including four each by Manu Ginóbili and Bruce Bowen, who did not score a point in Game 1. Ginobili again led the Spurs with a 27 points, while Tim Duncan finished with 18 points and 11 rebounds. Antonio McDyess was the high scorer for Detroit, scoring 15 points off the bench.

The 2–0 lead was a big advantage for San Antonio. In the history of the NBA, the team with home-court advantage started a series with a 2–0 lead 153 times. On just seven occasions, the trailing team rebounded to win the series.

=== Game 3 ===
ABC

June 14
9:00 pm

Recap at the Wayback Machine (archived March 16, 2009)

San Antonio Spurs 79, Detroit Pistons 96
Scoring by quarter: 27–21, 15–20, 23–29, 14–26
Pts: Tony Parker 21; Rebs: Tim Duncan 10; Asts: Duncan, Parker 4 each	Pts: Richard Hamilton 24; Rebs: Ben Wallace 11; Asts: Chauncey Billups 7
San Antonio leads series, 2–1

The Palace of Auburn Hills, Auburn Hills, Michigan
Attendance: 22,076
Referees:
- No. 15 Bennett Salvatore
- No. 26 Bob Delaney
- No. 17 Joe Crawford

In NBA history, only two teams had ever won a Finals series after facing a 2–0 deficit—the Boston Celtics in the 1969 NBA Finals and the Portland Trail Blazers in the 1977 NBA Finals—however, just one year later the Miami Heat would accomplish this feat against the Dallas Mavericks in the 2006 NBA Finals.

With that task looming ahead, the Pistons responded in tremendous fashion. Chauncey Billups and Richard Hamilton combined for 44 points, while Ben Wallace (15 pts, 11 reb, 5 blk, 3 stl) together with Rasheed Wallace and Antonio McDyess harassed Tim Duncan into a 5–15 shooting night. The Pistons dominated the second half, outscoring the Spurs 55–37.

The Pistons became the first team to score more than 90 points in a Finals game against the Spurs during this game.

=== Game 4 ===
ABC

June 16
9:00 pm

Recap at the Wayback Machine (archived March 16, 2009)

San Antonio Spurs 71, Detroit Pistons 102
Scoring by quarter: 17–23, 19–28, 21–23, 14–28
Pts: Tim Duncan 16; Rebs: Tim Duncan 16; Asts: Bowen, Parker 4 each	Pts: Billups, Hunter 17 each Rebs: Ben Wallace 13; Asts: Chauncey Billups 7
Series tied, 2–2

The Palace of Auburn Hills, Auburn Hills, Michigan
Attendance: 22,076
Referees:
- No. 27 Dick Bavetta
- No. 32 Eddie F. Rush
- No. 14 Joe DeRosa

The pattern of the first two games held up in games 3 and 4: home team wins big in the first one and even bigger in the second. And Game 4 was the most lopsided of all during the 2005 NBA Finals; the Pistons' 102 points were the only time either team reached triple digits in the series.

Seven Pistons scored in double figures, especially efficient bench performances by Lindsey Hunter and Antonio McDyess. In 22 minutes, Hunter scored 17 points and dished out 5 assists; McDyess scored 13 and grabbed 7 rebounds in just 19 minutes.

Conversely, only three Spurs scored in double figures (Ginobili, Duncan, Parker), and among all Spurs attempting five or more field goals, only Tony Parker (6–13, 46.2% shooting) managed to surpass the 45% mark. Collectively, the Spurs shot 37% and committed 17 turnovers to the Pistons' NBA Finals-record four.

Hunter's and Billups' 17 points were the fewest to lead an NBA Finals game since George Yardley of the Fort Wayne Pistons led all scorers with 16 points in the fifth game of the 1955 NBA Finals.

=== Game 5 ===
ABC

June 19
9:00 pm

Recap at the Wayback Machine (archived March 11, 2009)

San Antonio Spurs 96, Detroit Pistons 95 (OT)
Scoring by quarter: 21–23, 21–19, 22–21, 25–26, Overtime: 7–6
Pts: Tim Duncan 26; Rebs: Tim Duncan 19; Asts: Manu Ginóbili 9	Pts: Chauncey Billups 34; Rebs: Ben Wallace 12; Asts: Chauncey Billups 7
San Antonio leads series, 3–2

The Palace of Auburn Hills, Auburn Hills, Michigan
Attendance: 22,076
Referees:
- No. 24 Mike Callahan
- No. 10 Ron Garretson
- No. 29 Steve Javie

With the first four games of the 2005 Finals being blowouts by the home team, Game 5 was a widely anticipated close game, and became a memorable game in Finals history.

The game was closely contested by throughout the night as the lead changed 12 separate times, and the game was tied on 18 occasions. Regulation was not enough to settle this game, so the game went into overtime. The Pistons streaked out to a quick lead in the first few minutes of overtime, and seemed to have the game in hand. However, a missed layup by Chauncey Billups with Detroit ahead 95–93 with nine seconds remaining left San Antonio with a chance. On the Spurs' next possession, Robert Horry inbounded the ball to Ginobili, who headed for the left corner and dished it right back to Horry. Rasheed Wallace had left Horry to double-team Ginobili, and Horry was left alone to sink the game-winning basket with 5.8 seconds remaining in the OT. Horry was already famous for nailing last-second shots in the playoffs, including Game Four of the 2002 Western Conference finals between the Lakers and Sacramento Kings.

Horry went 5 for 6 from beyond the arc, including the game-winner, and scored 21 points coming off the bench. He hadn't scored a point until the final play of the 3rd quarter. He carried the team in the fourth quarter and overtime as his teammates struggled with the weight of a must-win game on the road against an accomplished adversary. In addition to the game-winning three-pointer, late in overtime Horry made a spectacular left-handed dunk while being fouled as the shot clock wound down.

Tim Duncan, despite struggling from the free-throw line, finished with 26 points and 19 rebounds for the Spurs. Chauncey Billups was the high scorer for the Pistons, finishing with a game-high 34 points in the losing effort.

To date, this is the most recent NBA Finals game played in Metro Detroit.

=== Game 6 ===
ABC

June 21
9:00 pm (8:00 pm CDT)

Recap at the Wayback Machine (archived March 16, 2009)

Detroit Pistons 95, San Antonio Spurs 86
Scoring by quarter: 23–23, 23–24, 25–20, 24–19
Pts: Richard Hamilton 23; Rebs: Ben Wallace 9 Asts: Chauncey Billups 6	Pts: Duncan, Ginóbili 21 each Rebs: Tim Duncan 15; Asts: Tony Parker 5
Series tied, 3–3

SBC Center, San Antonio, Texas
Attendance: 18,797
Referees:
- No. 15 Bennett Salvatore
- No. 7 Bernie Fryer
- No. 43 Dan Crawford

Game 6 was a close game all along, and the lead kept fluctuating between the two teams. Again, the leading stars on both teams played big games. Detroit pulled away early in the fourth for an 80–73 lead with five minutes to go, but the Spurs continued to threaten them. Soon, it was back to a one-point game.

Then, Rasheed Wallace planted a three-pointer to pull away, and even with a resilient game by the Spurs, the Pistons had clinched the victory.

Nevertheless, several Pistons free throws were necessary in the final moments of the game to put a win out of reach for the Spurs.

Rasheed Wallace had a big game to atone for the mistake he made for leaving Horry open in Game 5. Despite his mistake, Wallace was nonchalant about the play, even commenting incorrectly that he left Horry to guard Duncan.

Billups and Prince again led the Pistons with steady, unwavering defense, which is the key, as it is often said, to victory. Although Duncan and Ginobili finished with 21 points each, neither was able to seriously threaten the strong Pistons defense enough to win the game. Detroit thus won its fifth consecutive game facing elimination. The Pistons became the first road team to force a Game 7 in the NBA Finals.

=== Game 7 ===
ABC

June 23
9:00 pm (8:00 pm CDT)

Recap at the Wayback Machine (archived February 19, 2009)

Detroit Pistons 74, San Antonio Spurs 81
Scoring by quarter: 16–18, 23–20, 18–19, 17–24
Pts: Richard Hamilton 15; Rebs: Ben Wallace 11; Asts: Chauncey Billups 8	Pts: Tim Duncan 25; Rebs: Tim Duncan 11; Asts: Manu Ginóbili 4
San Antonio wins NBA Finals, 4–3

SBC Center, San Antonio, Texas
Attendance: 18,797
Referees:
- No. 27 Dick Bavetta
- No. 32 Eddie F. Rush
- No. 17 Joe Crawford

External videos
- Full game broadcast by ABC on YouTube

For the first time in eleven years, the NBA Finals came down to a decisive Game 7, the longest span between Game 7s in NBA history. Momentum was on Detroit's side, but the Spurs had home-court advantage. The Pistons were looking to become the first team to ever win the last two games on the road after being down 3–2. NBA history was heavily in favor of the Spurs, who were looking to celebrate a title at the SBC Center for the second time in three years. NBA teams are 74–17 all-time at home in Game 7, and 9-0 when leading 3–2 going home.

Entering this game, the Pistons tied the 1994 New York Knicks for most games played in a single postseason, with 25. The Boston Celtics broke this record during their 2008 championship season.

Like the previous two games of the series, Game 7 was closely contested throughout, but the Spurs fell into a nine-point deficit with 7:45 left in the third quarter. Though Tim Duncan was for much of the series unable to shoot for a high percentage against Detroit's front line, he led the Spurs out of that nine-point hole. In the final 7:45 of the third quarter, Duncan scored 10 of the teams' 18 final third quarter points and the game was tied to start the fourth. Behind clutch plays from Tim Duncan and Manu Ginóbili, the Spurs took control of the fourth quarter to earn an 81–74 victory, clinching the franchise's third Larry O'Brien Trophy. For the game, Tim Duncan finished with a game high 25 points and 11 rebounds, while teammate Manu Ginóbili pitched in with 23 points. Richard Hamilton, with 15 points, was the high scorer for the Pistons, who fell just short of winning back-to-back championships.

Tim Duncan won his third NBA Finals MVP Award. Manu Ginóbili, Tony Parker, and Bruce Bowen each received their second championship ring, while Robert Horry became only the second player in NBA history (John Salley being the first) to play on championship teams for three different franchises. Sean Marks became the first New Zealander to win a championship ring.

== Player statistics ==
Legend
GP	Games played	GS	Games started	MPG	Minutes per game
FG%	Field-goal percentage	3P%	3-point field-goal percentage	FT%	Free-throw percentage
RPG	Rebounds per game	APG	Assists per game	SPG	Steals per game
BPG	Blocks per game	PPG	Points per game

San Antonio Spurs

San Antonio Spurs statistics
Player	GP	GS	MPG	FG%	3P%	FT%	RPG	APG	SPG	BPG	PPG
Brent Barry	7	0	20.6	.407	.375	.800	2.1	1.6	0.6	0.3	4.6
Bruce Bowen	7	7	38.7	.380	.448	.667	2.7	2.0	0.6	0.7	7.9
Devin Brown	6	0	5.8	.273	.500	.571	1.0	0.5	0.0	0.0	1.8
Tim Duncan	7	7	40.7	.419	.000	.667	14.1	2.1	0.4	2.1	20.6
Manu Ginóbili	7	7	36.0	.494	.387	.854	5.9	4.0	1.3	0.1	18.7
Robert Horry	7	0	28.6	.444	.484	.733	4.9	2.1	1.0	0.7	10.6
Tony Massenburg	3	0	3.0	.000	.000	.000	1.0	0.0	0.0	0.0	0.0
Nazr Mohammed	7	7	22.6	.433	.000	.727	6.0	0.0	0.3	0.9	4.9
Radoslav Nesterović	4	0	6.5	.500	.000	.000	2.0	0.3	0.0	0.3	0.5
Tony Parker	7	7	38.1	.458	.143	.438	2.4	3.4	0.3	0.1	13.9
Glenn Robinson	3	0	4.7	.200	.000	.000	1.0	0.0	0.0	1.0	0.7
Beno Udrih	5	0	8.8	.364	.500	1.000	1.0	0.8	0.2	0.0	2.4

Detroit Pistons

Detroit Pistons statistics
Player	GP	GS	MPG	FG%	3P%	FT%	RPG	APG	SPG	BPG	PPG
Carlos Arroyo	5	0	6.0	.500	.000	.500	0.2	0.6	0.2	0.0	2.2
Chauncey Billups	7	7	40.1	.434	.297	.909	5.0	6.3	1.0	0.1	20.4
Elden Campbell	1	0	1.0	.000	.000	.000	0.0	1.0	0.0	0.0	0.0
Ronald Dupree	5	0	1.6	.000	.000	.000	0.0	0.0	0.0	0.0	0.0
Darvin Ham	5	0	2.2	.500	.000	.000	0.6	0.0	0.0	0.0	0.4
Richard Hamilton	7	7	42.0	.386	.167	.750	5.3	2.6	0.6	0.1	16.7
Lindsey Hunter	7	0	19.7	.381	.000	.875	1.9	2.7	1.3	0.1	5.6
Antonio McDyess	7	0	21.9	.508	.000	.556	7.3	1.0	0.9	1.1	10.1
Darko Miličić	3	0	2.0	.333	.000	.000	0.7	0.0	0.0	0.0	0.7
Tayshaun Prince	7	7	39.1	.382	.111	.857	4.9	2.6	1.4	0.6	10.1
Ben Wallace	7	7	40.0	.569	.000	.429	10.3	1.0	1.7	3.0	10.7
Rasheed Wallace	7	7	32.7	.438	.294	.250	5.6	1.9	2.0	2.4	10.9

== Broadcasting ==
The games were broadcast exclusively on ABC in the United States (Locally, the games aired on ABC stations KSAT-TV in San Antonio and WXYZ-TV in Detroit). The featured song, aired throughout the playoffs, was Rob Thomas' "This Is How A Heart Breaks." Game 3 had a Nielsen rating percentage of only 7.2% of households and cumulating to a 7.1 average for the first three games, 32% lower than the average of the first three 2004 NBA Finals games. While all seven games were the top-rated shows of their nights, the average viewership of the 2005 Finals (11.5 million viewers, 7.6 rating/14 share) decreased from the average of the 2004 Finals (17.9 million, 11.5/20). The 2003 Finals averaged 9.8 million viewers and 6.5/12.

The 2005 Finals would be Michaels' last major NBA assignment with ABC, though he remained with ABC until after Super Bowl XL in February 2006. Shortly after ABC's NFL television contract ended, Michaels moved to NBC Sports to become the lead voice of Sunday Night Football. ABC's lead position was eventually filled by Mike Breen.

== Aftermath ==
The Spurs won a franchise-record 63 victories to clinch the top seed in the West in the 2005–06 NBA season. However, for the third time they were unable to win consecutive championships, bowing to their Texas rivals, the Dallas Mavericks, in Game 7 of the Conference semifinals. The Mavs would go on to lose in the 2006 NBA Finals. The Spurs went on to win the 2007 NBA Finals the following year, their fourth as a franchise, and won again in 2014.

As of 2025, this is the Pistons’ last appearance in the NBA Finals. Head coach Larry Brown sought and succeeded in buying out his contract as head coach after the season. He eventually ended up coaching for his hometown New York Knicks, but would only win 23 games in one season. Brown eventually left after the season, and two years later Brown resurfaced, this time coaching the Charlotte Bobcats, where he would lead them to the playoffs in his second year.

The Pistons, guided by new coach Flip Saunders, won a franchise-record 64 games and seemed primed to regain the NBA title. However, Detroit fell in six games to the Miami Heat, who would go on and win the 2006 NBA title. Franchise centerpiece Ben Wallace abruptly left for the Chicago Bulls, yet the Pistons still made the conference finals the next two seasons, losing to the Cleveland Cavaliers and Boston Celtics, respectively. Finally, the remaining core of the team was dismantled at the start of the 2008–09 NBA season when Finals MVP Chauncey Billups, along with Antonio McDyess and Cheikh Samb, was traded for Allen Iverson in November of that season.

This Finals series saw each participating team use a special court containing a decal of the Larry O'Brien Championship Trophy at center court and the NBA Finals wordmark near the free-throw lanes. These were used until 2009, and were brought back starting in 2026 but with the trophy and wordmarks now painted for safety purposes.
