= David Frigout =

French basketball player

Personal information
- Born: 8 May 1973 (age 53) Lorient
- Listed height: 2.06 m (6 ft 9 in)
- Position: center

Career history
- 1990–1993: ALM Évreux Basket
- 1993–1995: Fullerton
- 1995–1998: ALM Évreux Basket
- 1998–2000: CSP Limoges
- 2000–2004: ASVEL Villeurbanne
- 2004–2005: Spirou Charleroi

David Frigout (born 8 May 1973 in Lorient (Morbihan)), is a former French basketball player.

== Biography ==
Currently living in Limoges, he now restores property, and runs two franchises of Subway in the same town.

== Clubs ==
- 1990–1993: ALM Évreux Basket (Pro B)
- 1993–1995: Fullerton (NCAA I)
- 1995–1998: ALM Évreux Basket (Pro A)
- 1998–2000: CSP Limoges (Pro A)
- 2000–2004: ASVEL Villeurbanne (Pro A)
- 2004–2005: Spirou Charleroi (BLB)

== Honours ==
- Winner of the Coupe Korac in 2000 with Limoges
- French Champions in 2000 with Limoges and in 2002 with ASVEL
- Runner-up in French Championship in 2001 with ASVEL
- Coupe de France: in 2000 with Limoges and in 2001 with ASVEL
- 5 caps for France.
