= Raphaël Desroses =

French basketball player

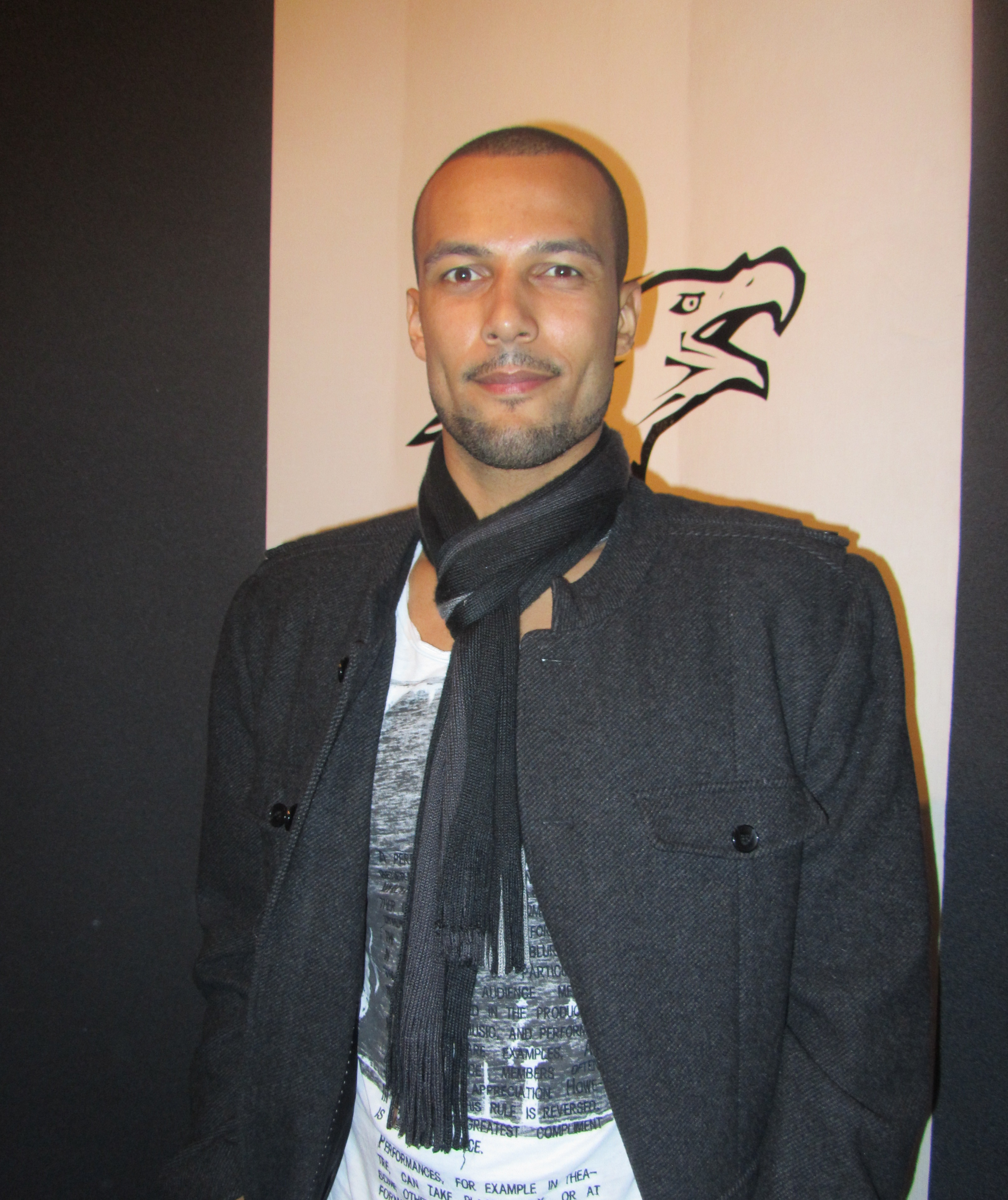
Raphaël Desroses

Raphaël Desroses (born 18 October 1980 in Melun, France) is a French former professional basketball player.

== Professional career ==
During his pro career, Desroses played with the French 1st Division and French 2nd Division clubs Cholet, Roanne, Besançon, and Limoges, from 2003 to 2011. He was the French 2nd Division French Player's MVP in 2006.

== Career timeline ==
His career timeline strating from young age to professional career-

- Early / Junior career: started at youth clubs including ES Dammarie-les-Lys and Avon.
- 1997-2000: Poissy-Chatou (Pro B)
- 2000-2001: Montpellier (Pro A)
- 2001-2003: College basketball in USA — Central Florida Community College, Garden City Community College (NJCAA)
- 2003-2004: Cholet Basket (Pro A)
- 2004-2005: Chorale de Roanne (Pro A)
- 2005-2007: Angers BC 49 (Pro B)
- 2007-2008: JL Bourg-en-Bresse (Pro B)
- 2008-2009: Besançon Basket Comté Doubs (Pro A)
- 2009-2012: Limoges CSP (alternating Pro B / Pro A)
- 2012-2014: Antibes (Pro B / Pro A)
- 2014-2015: Chorale Roanne (Pro B)
- 2015-2017: Fos-Provence (Pro B)
- 2017-2021: Stade de Vanves Basket (NM2 then NM1) — These were his final playing years

== Career after retirement ==
In 2021, Desroses decided to retire and shift his career as coach. He worked as assistant coach with Cergy-pontoise in NM1.

In July 2022, he was officially appointed as head coach of ParisBasketball Espoirs, making his official transition into his coaching career.
