= Champagne Basket =

- Leagues: Pro B
- Founded: 17 June 2010; 14 years ago
- History: Champagne Châlons-Reims Basket; 2010–2020; Champagne Basket; 2020–present
- Arena: Complexe René-Tys; Pierre de Coubertin
- Capacity: 3,000; 2,791
- Location: Châlons-Reims, France
- Team colors: Blue, Gold, White, Dark Blue
- President: Michel Gobillot
- Head coach: Cédric Heitz
- Website: champagne-basket.fr
Home	Away

Champagne Basket is a French professional basketball club that is based in both the cities of Reims and Châlons-en-Champagne. The club was established in 2010 as part of the union between the old clubs of Reims Champagne Basket club (RCB) and the ESPE Basket Pro club of Châlons-en-Champagne. Since 2022, the team plays in the LNB Pro B, the second tier division of French basketball.

== History ==
The historical regional rivals of Reims Champagne Basket club (RCB) and the ESPE Basket Pro club of Châlons-en-Champagne, combined forces to create a strong, financially stable, competitive ball club on the French elite professional stage. The club was founded as Champagne Châlons-Reims Basket (CCRB) on 17 June 2010. Two years following up the union, the Ligue Nationale de Basket (LNB) invited the CCRB to move up directly to the LNB Pro A through a wild-card.

In 2020, the club changed its name to "Champagne Basket".

== Arenas ==
The club's home arenas are the Complexe Sportif René Tys (Reims) and the Palais des Sports Pierre de Coubertin (Châlons). Each arena hosts half of their home games.

== Season by season ==
Season	Tier	Division	Pos.	French Cup
2010–11	2	Pro B	10th	1R
2011–12	2	Pro B	3rd	R32
2012–13	2	Pro B	3rd	1R
2013–14	2	Pro B	3rd (Note: Entered the Pro A after the team was offered a wild card due to the expansion of the league from 16 to 18 teams.)	1R
2014–15	1	Pro A	12th	R32
2015–16	1	Pro A	15th	R32
2016–17	1	Pro A	16th	R16
2017–18	1	Pro A	14th	R16
2018–19	1	Pro A	13th	3R
2019–20	1	Pro A	14th	QF
2020–21	1	Pro A	12th	R16
2021–22	1	Pro A	18th	3R
2022–23	2	Pro B		

== Players ==
=== Current roster ===
Note: Flags indicate national team eligibility at FIBA-sanctioned events. Players may hold other non-FIBA nationalities not displayed.

Champagne Basket roster
Players
Coaches

Pos.	No.	Nat.	Name	Ht.	Age
SF	0	(France)	Klein, Thomas	2.00 m (6 ft 7 in)	22 – 27 December 2002
PG	1	(France)	Crusol, Timothé	1.93 m (6 ft 4 in)	23 – 5 April 2001
PG	5	(United States)	Jackson, Marquis	1.83 m (6 ft 0 in)	30 – 16 September 1994
PG	7	(France)	Keita, Mathis	1.96 m (6 ft 5 in)	33 – 15 January 1992
PG	10	(Senegal)	Sambe, Lamine	1.88 m (6 ft 2 in)	35 – 15 December 1989
SF	13	(Serbia)	Milošević, Đorđe	1.99 m (6 ft 6 in)	31 – 20 June 1993
F/C	14	(Cuba)	Paumier, Grismay	2.05 m (6 ft 9 in)	26 – 12 July 1998
PG	22	(France)	Selebangue, Kameronn	1.90 m (6 ft 3 in)	20 – 18 November 2004
F	24	(Croatia)	Skara, David	2.03 m (6 ft 8 in)	30 – 26 February 1995
PF	27	(France)	Semelet, Maxime	1.99 m (6 ft 6 in)	22 – 9 August 2002
C	95	(France)	Vent, Vincent	2.06 m (6 ft 9 in)	27 – 11 November 1997

Head coach

- (France) Thomas Andrieux

Assistant coach(es)

- (France) Fréderic Jaudon

Legend

- (C) Team captain
- Injured

- Roster
Updated: January 8, 2023

=== Notable players ===
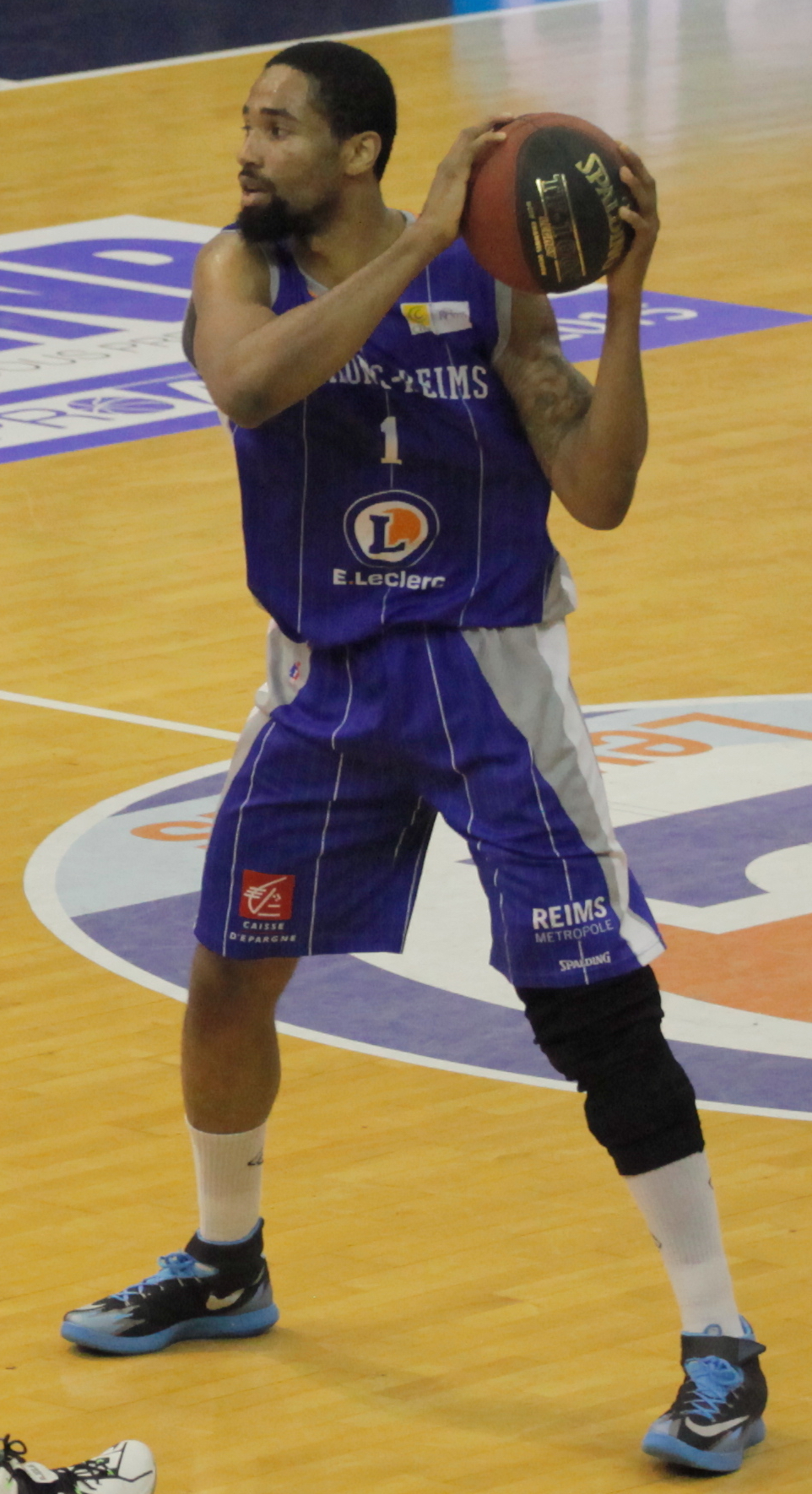
Da'Sean Butler

Note: Flags indicate national team eligibility at FIBA-sanctioned events. Players may hold other non-FIBA nationalities not displayed.

Criteria

To appear in this section a player must have either:

- Set a club record or won an individual award while at the club
- Played at least one official international match for their national team at any time
- Played at least one official NBA match at any time.

- (France) Johan Passave-Ducteil
- (France) Jean-Baptiste Maille
- (France) Yannis Morin
- (France) Angelo Tsagarakis
- (Ivory Coast) Guy Landry Edi
- (Czech Republic) Blake Schilb
- (Ghana) Ben Bentil
- (Iceland) Martin Hermannsson
- (Netherlands) Nicolas de Jong
- (Switzerland) David Ramseier
- (United States) Jimmy Baron
- (United States) Da'Sean Butler
- (United States) Devin Ebanks
- (United States) Drew Gordon
- (United States) Bryan Mullins
- (United States) Mark Payne
- (United States) LaMonte Ulmer
- (Lithuania) Arnas Velička
