= Zachery Peacock =

American basketball player (born 1987)

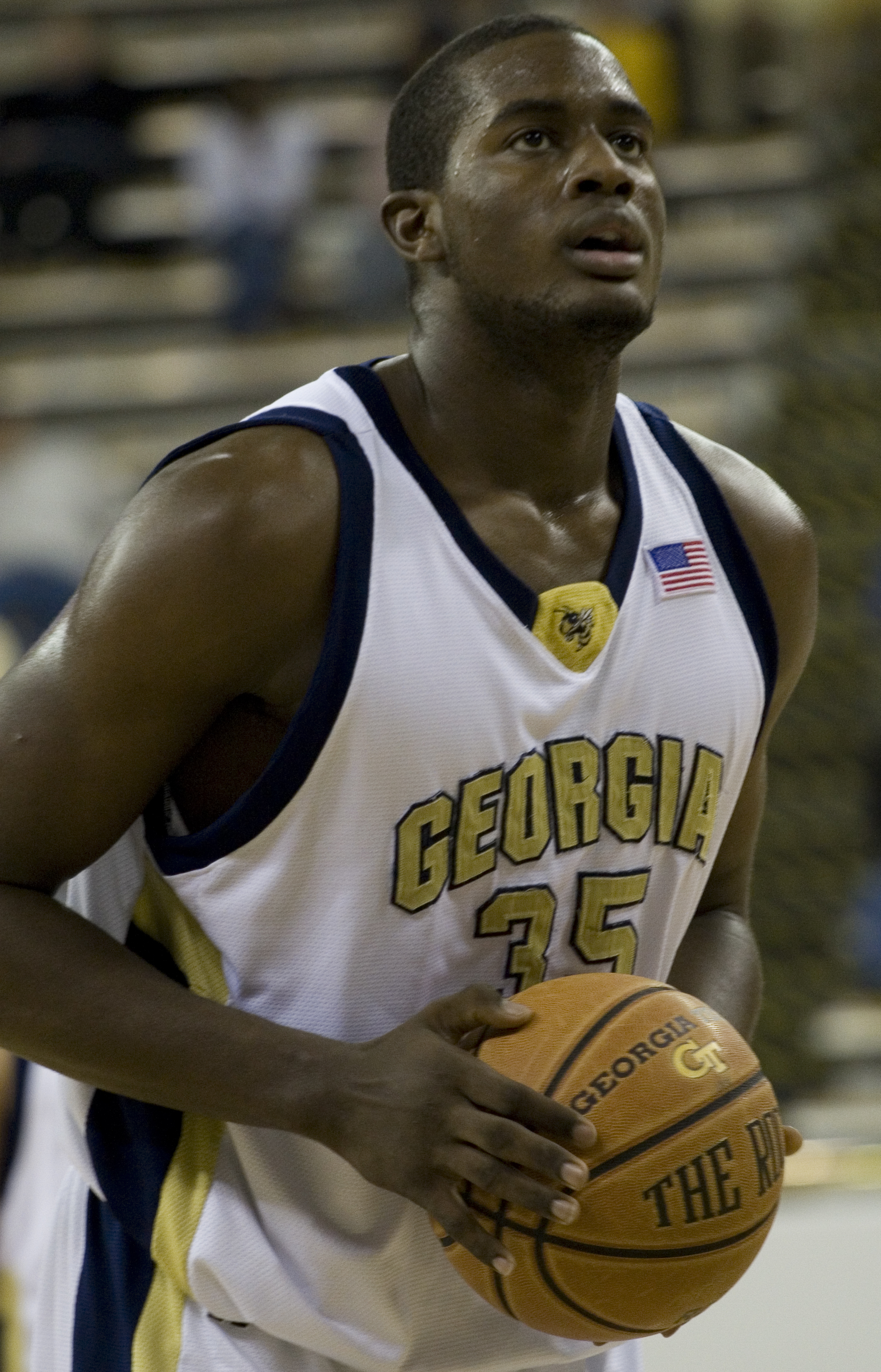
- Peacock with Georgia Tech in 2007

Personal information
- Born: October 13, 1987 (age 38) Miami, Florida, U.S.
- Listed height: 2.03 m (6 ft 8 in)
- Listed weight: 107 kg (236 lb)

Career information
- High school: Miami Norland (Miami, Florida)
- College: Georgia Tech (2006–2010)
- NBA draft: 2010: undrafted
- Playing career: 2010–2022
- Position: Center / power forward

Career history
- 2010–2011: Gießen 46ers
- 2011–2012: Eisbären Bremerhaven
- 2012–2013: Skyliners Frankfurt
- 2013–2014: SOMB
- 2014–2015: Cholet
- 2015–2016: Melikşah Üniversitesi
- 2016–2021: JL Bourg
- 2021–2022: Fos Provence Basket

Career highlights
- French Pro A League MVP (2018); French Pro A League scoring champion (2018); French 2nd Division MVP (2017); French 2nd Division Foreign MVP (2014); 2× LNB Pro B Best Scorer (2014, 2017)

Zachery Xavier Peacock II (born October 13, 1987) is an American former basketball player. He played college basketball for Georgia Tech, before starting a professional career in 2010. In his career he played for several teams in Germany and France.

== College career ==
He played four seasons with the Georgia Tech Yellow Jackets, where he averaged 8.3 points and 3.9 rebounds per game.

== Professional career ==
After going undrafted in the 2010 NBA draft, Peacock signed with the Gießen 46ers of the German Basketball Bundesliga (BBL) on August 2. In his rookie season, he averaged 13.7 points and 6.4 rebounds per game. For the following 2011–12 season, he transferred to other BBL team Eisbären Bremerhaven, where he averaged 11.8 points and 5.4 rebounds per game. In October 2012, Peacock signed with his third BBL club Fraport Skyliners, where averaged 15.4 points and 5.2 rebound per game.

In the 2013–14 season, Peacock played in the French second-tier Pro B, with SOMB. He averaged 20.0 points and 8.0 rebounds per game with SOMB. He won the Foreign MVP award in his debut season and helped the team advance to Pro A. In June 2014, he signed with Cholet Basket of the first tier Pro A. However, in February 2015 he was released from the team after being suspended following a discussion with his teammate. Peacock then signed with Turkish side Melikşah Üniversitesi S.K. of the Turkish second-tier TBL the following week. Peacock finished the season averaging 15.6 points and 8.9 rebounds per game.

In June 2015, Peacock returned to France by signing with JL Bourg Basket of the Pro B to a two-year deal. A year later, he achieved promotion to the Pro A with the club. In the 2016–17 season, Peacock was named the LNB Pro B MVP while leading his team to the championship and promotion. In May 2018, Peacock won the Pro A Most Valuable Player Award after leading the league in points, 19.3 per game, and evaluation rating, 20.3 per game.

On July 24, 2021, Peacock signed with Le Mans. On August 25, 2021, his club announced, after three successive postponements of his arrival in France, they could only note the absence of the player and terminated his contract.

On December 21, 2021, he has signed with Fos Provence Basket of the LNB Pro A.
