= JA Vichy Basket =

JA Vichy
- Nickname: "JAV"
- Leagues: Pro B
- Founded: 2015; 11 years ago
- History: JA Vichy-Clermont Métropole (2015–2023)
- Arena: Palais des Sports Pierre Coulon
- Capacity: 3,200
- Location: Vichy, France
- Team colors
- President: Yann Le Diouris
- Head coach: Dounia Issa
- Website: www.vcm-basket.com

Jeanne d'Arc de Vichy Basket, most commonly known as JA Vichy or JAV, is a French professional basketball club that is based in Vichy. The team plays in the Pro B, the second highest professional division in France. The club was formed in 2015 after a merger of JA Vichy and Stade Clermontois BA. In October 2023, the merger was set to end, whereupon the club was scheduled to return to its previous club name, JA Vichy, again.

== Season by season ==
Season	Tier	League	Pos.	French Cup	Other competitions
2015–16	2	Pro B	10th		
2016–17	2	Pro B	14th		

=== 2025 roster ===
Note: Flags indicate national team eligibility at FIBA-sanctioned events. Players may hold other non-FIBA nationalities not displayed.

JA Vichy Basket roster
Players
Coaches

Pos.	No.	Nat.	Name
SG	0	(Ivory Coast)	Assémian Moularé
G	8	(France)	Kylan Castaings-Otto
PF	10	(France)	Lucas Dufeal
C	16	(France)	Serge Mourtala
	88	(France)	Luka Salaneuve
F	93	(France)	Kenny Kasiama

Head coach

(France) Dounia Issa

Assistant coach(es)

(France) Anthony Boutillier

Legend

- (C) Team captain
- Injured

- Roster
Updated: 18 August 2025

== Head coaches ==
- (France) Guillaume Vizade (2017–2024)
- (France) Dounia Issa (2024–present)

== Notable players ==
- (France) Jordan Aboudou
- (France) Léopold Delaunay
- (France) Stephane Risacher
- (Ivory Coast) Cédric Bah
- (Ivory Coast) Assémian Moularé
- (Georgia (country)) Corey Fisher
- (Nigeria) Ime Udoka
- (United States) Dominez Burnett
- (United States) Kareem Reid
- (United States) Jamal Shuler
- (United States) Quinton Hooker

== Trophies and honors ==
=== Domestic competitions ===
- French League

Winners (3): 1972, 2002, 2007

- French Basketball Cup

Winners (2): 1969, 1970

- French Pro B Leaders Cup

Winners (1): 2024

- Semaine des As

Runners-up (1): 2008

- French NM1

Champions (2): 1963, 1964

=== European competitions ===
- Saporta Cup

Runners-up (1): 1970
