= Saint-Vallier Basket Drôme =

SVBD
- Leagues: Pro B
- Founded: 1993; 32 years ago
- History: Saint-Vallier Basket Drôme; 1993–present
- Arena: Rives Sports Complex
- Capacity: 2,132
- Location: Saint-Vallier, France
- Team colors: Yellow, Red
- President: Patrice Péricard
- Head coach: Jean-Sebastien Chardon
- Website: svbd.fr
Home	Away

Saint-Vallier Basket Drôme, commonly known as SVBD, is a professional basketball club based in Saint-Vallier, France. The club was founded in 1993 and currently plays in the Pro B, the second tier of French basketball. Home games of the club are played at the Rives Sports Complex, which has capacity for 2,132 people.

== Players ==
=== Notable players ===
Note: Flags indicate national team eligibility at FIBA-sanctioned events. Players may hold other non-FIBA nationalities not displayed.

Criteria

To appear in this section a player must have either:

- Set a club record or won an individual award while at the club
- Played at least one official international match for their national team at any time
- Played at least one official NBA match at any time.

- (Senegal) Malick Badiane
