= ALM Évreux Basket =

- Leagues: LNB Pro B
- Founded: 1962; 64 years ago
- Arena: Salle Jean Fourré
- Capacity: 3,399
- Location: Evreux, France
- President: Patrick Roussel
- Head coach: Nedeljko Ašćerić
- Website: www.alm-evreux-basket.com
| Home | Away |

ALM Évreux Basket is a French professional basketball club based in Evreux, France. The team plays in the LNB Pro B, the French second division.

== Season by season ==
| Season | Tier | League | Pos. | French Cup | European competitions |
|---|---|---|---|---|---|
| 2011–12 | 2 | Pro B | 8th | Eightfinalist | |
| 2012–13 | 2 | Pro B | 3rd | Quarterfinalist | |
| 2013–14 | 2 | Pro B | 6th | Quarterfinalist | |
| 2014–15 | 2 | Pro B | 10th | Round of 32 | |
| 2015–16 | 2 | Pro B | 3rd | | |
| 2016–17 | 2 | Pro B | 6th | | |
| 2017–18 | 2 | Pro B | | | |

== Honours ==
LNB Pro B Leaders Cup Champions 2021-2022

== Notable players ==
Note: Flags indicate national team eligibility at FIBA-sanctioned events. Players may hold other non-FIBA nationalities not displayed.

Criteria

To appear in this section a player must have either:

- Set a club record or won an individual award while at the club
- Played at least one official international match for their national team at any time
- Played at least one official NBA match at any time.

- (France) Isaia Cordinier
- (France) Joseph Gomis
- (France) Filipe da Silva
- (France) David Frigout
- (France) Jean-Marc Kraidy
- (Democratic Republic of the Congo) Ruphin Kayembe-Tshiabu
- (United States) Kenny Atkinson
- (United States) Bruce Bowen
- (United States) Joe Burton (basketball)
- (United States) Samme Givens
- (United States) Jeremiah Wood
- (Iceland) Frank Aron Booker
