= Stade Clermontois BA =

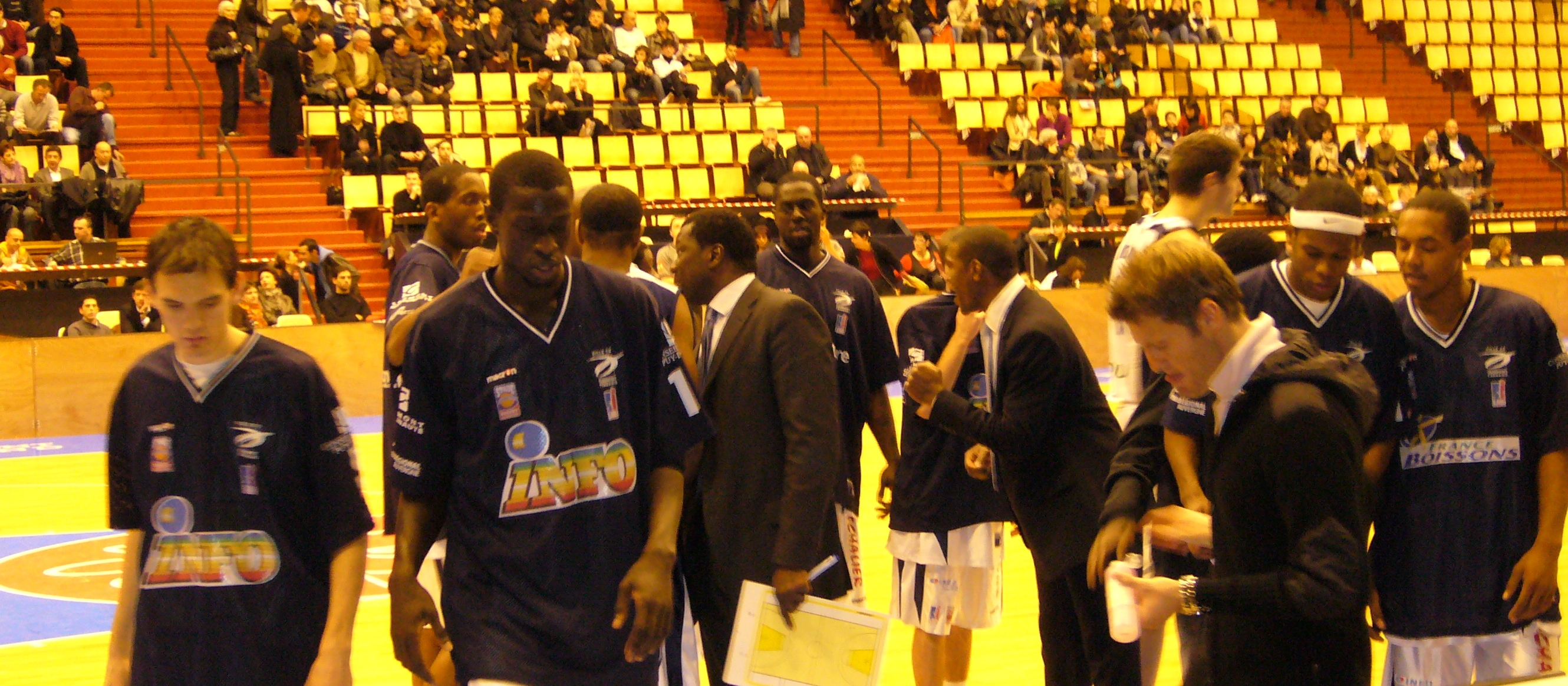
- Founded: 1938
- Dissolved: 2015
- History: Stade Clermontois BA (1938–2015)
- Arena: Honoré et Jean Fleury
- Capacity: 1,200
- Location: Clermont-Ferrand, France

Stade Clermontois Basket Auvergne was a French professional basketball club based in Clermont-Ferrand. The team was active in the second division LNB Pro B for several years, as well as some years in the first division LNB Pro A.

In 2015, the club merged with JA Vichy to create JA Vichy-Clermont Métropole.

== See also ==
- Category:Stade Clermontois BA players
