= Hermine Nantes Basket =

Hermine Nantes
- Leagues: Pro B
- Founded: 1932; 93 years ago
- Arena: Palais des Sports de Beaulieu
- Capacity: 4,700
- Location: Nantes, France
- President: Jean-Luc Cadio
- Head coach: Neno Ašćerić
- Championships: 1 Pro B Leaders Cup
- Website: nantes-basket.com
Home	Away

Hermine Nantes Basket, also known as simply Nantes, is a professional basketball team based in Nantes, France. The team currently plays in French LNB Pro B, the second national level. The Palais des Sports de Beaulieu is the home arena of the team.

== Honours ==
LNB Pro B Leaders Cup

- Winners (1): 2020

== Season by season ==
Season	Tier	League	Pos.	French Cup	Other competitions
2009–10	2	Pro B	15th		
2010–11	2	Pro B	9th		
2011–12	2	Pro B	13th		
2012–13	2	Pro B	16th		
2013–14	2	Pro B	15th		
2014–15	2	Pro B	5th		
2015–16	2	Pro B	7th		
2016–17	2	Pro B	3rd		

== Notable players ==
Note: Flags indicate national team eligibility at FIBA-sanctioned events. Players may hold other non-FIBA nationalities not displayed.

Criteria

To appear in this section a player must have either:

- Set a club record or won an individual award while at the club
- Played at least one official international match for their national team at any time
- Played at least one official NBA match at any time.

- (Democratic Republic of the Congo) Carl Ona-Embo
- (Poland) Aaron Cel
- (Senegal) Malick Badiane
- (Switzerland) David Ramseier
- (United States) George Reese
- (United States) Rashaun Freeman
- (United States) Brendan Winters
- (United States) Eddie Lucas
- (United States) Marcus Relphorde
