= Besançon BCD =

Basketball club

Besançon Basket Comté Doubs is a professional basketball club based in Besançon, France, that plays in the fourth tier (NM2) of Ligue Nationale de Basketball. Their home arena is the Palais des sports Ghani-Yalouz.

== History ==
On 1 September 2009, the club was placed into receivership and liquidated; it ceased to exist. Eight years later, in 2017, the club re-launched in France's fourth tier division (NM2) league.
