= 2016 FIBA Europe Cup Final Four =

- The official logo of the 2016 Final Four

Tournament details
- Arena: Le Colisée; Chalon-sur-Saône, France
- Dates: 29 April 2016 – 1 May 2016

Final positions
- Champions: (Germany) Fraport Skyliners; 1st title
- Runners-up: (Italy) Openjobmetis Varese
- Third place: (France) Élan Chalon
- Fourth place: (Russia) Enisey

Awards and statistics
- MVP: (United States) Quantez Robertson
- Top scorer(s): (United States) Maalik Wayns (32)

The 2016 FIBA Europe Cup Final Four was the inaugural Final Four tournament in FIBA Europe Cup history, and was the concluding stage of the 2015–16 FIBA Europe Cup season. The Final Four was held from 29 April until 1 May 2016.

On 6 April 2016, FIBA announced that the tournament was to be held at Le Colisée in Chalon-sur-Saône, France. German side Fraport Skyliners won the tournament.

== Venue ==
Chalon-sur-Saône	2016 FIBA Europe Cup Final Four (Europe)
Le Colisée	2016 FIBA Europe Cup Final Four (Europe)
Capacity: 5,000	2016 FIBA Europe Cup Final Four (Europe)

== Teams ==
=== Road to the Final Four ===
Team	Regular season	Round of 32	Round of 16	Quarter-finals
(Germany) Fraport Skyliners	Group G – Second place	Group U – First place	Beat (Cyprus) AEK Larnaca, 2–0	Beat (Israel) Maccabi Rishon LeZion, 2–1
(France) Élan Chalon	Group D – First place	Group R – First place	Beat (Belgium) Telenet Oostende, 2–1	Beat (Ukraine) Khimik, 2–0
(Italy) Openjobmetis Varese	Group C – Second place	Group V – First place	Beat (Turkey) Royal Hali Gaziantep, 2–1	Beat (Belgium) Antwerp Giants, 2–1
(Russia) Enisey	Group H – Second place	Group R – Second place	Beat (Turkey) Türk Telekom, 2–0	Beat (Croatia) Cibona, 2–1

== Bracket ==
Semifinals
29 April
(Italy) Openjobmetis Varese	91
(France) Élan Chalon	82
29 April
(Germany) Fraport Skyliners	59
(Russia) Enisey	56

Final
1 May
(Italy) Openjobmetis Varese	62
(Germany) Fraport Skyliners	66
Third place game
1 May
(France) Élan Chalon	103
(Russia) Enisey	72

== Semi-finals ==
=== Openjobmetis Varese vs Élan Chalon ===
29 April 2016	Openjobmetis Varese (Italy)	91–82	(France) Élan Chalon	Chalon-sur-Saône
18:30	Scoring by quarter: 31–25, 16–28, 23–11, 21–18
	Pts: Davies, Kuksiks 17; Rebs: Wayns 6 Asts: Wayns 4	Report	Pts: Hazell 19; Rebs: Booker 13; Asts: Roberson 5	Arena: Le Colisée; Attendance: 4,950; Referees: Emir Moğulkoç (TUR), Janusz Calik (POL), Andrei Sharapa (BLR)

Starters:			Pts	Reb	Ast
PG	2	(United States) Maalik Wayns	16	6	4
SG	11	(United States) Chris Wright	12	4	0
SF	14	(Estonia) Kristjan Kangur	3	2	2
PF	30	(Latvia) Rihards Kuksiks	17	3	2
C	0	(United States) Brandon Davies	17	5	3
Reserves:					
G	10	(Italy) Daniele Cavaliero	8	2	2
F/C	12	(Italy) Luca Campani	16	4	0
F	21	(Italy) Giancarlo Ferrero	2	0	0
F	23	(Italy) Umberto Pietrini	DNP		
G	15	(Italy) Manuel Rossi	DNP		
G	6	(Lithuania) Ovidijus Varanauskas	DNP		
G	7	(Italy) Filippo Testa	DNP		
Head coach:
(Italian Basketball Federation) Paolo Moretti

Varese	Chalon

Starters:			Pts	Reb	Ast
PG	21	(United States) John Roberson	12	3	5
SG	4	(United States) Tyler Kalinoski	11	5	0
SF	5	(United States) Jeremy Hazell	19	7	2
PF	12	(France) Ilian Evtimov	2	1	1
C	31	(United States) Devin Booker	16	13	2
Reserves:					
F	6	(France) David Michineau	7	3	3
F	9	(France) Axel Bouteille	0	1	0
C	11	(France) Mathias Lessort	7	4	0
PF	32	(United States) Justin Brownlee	8	4	1
SF	10	(France) William Gradit	DNP		
C	14	(Senegal) Abdoulaye Ndoye	DNP		
SG	28	(France) Assane Ndoye	DNP		
Head coach:
(French Federation of Basketball) Jean-Denys Choulet

=== Fraport Skyliners vs Enisey ===
29 April 2016	Fraport Skyliners (Germany)	59–56	(Russia) Enisey	Chalon-sur-Saône
21:00	Scoring by quarter: 10–12, 20–17, 9–16, 20–11
	Pts: Voigtmann 16; Rebs: Barthel 10; Asts: Theodore 10	Report	Pts: Sergeev 13; Rebs: James, Kennedy 10; Asts: Kennedy 5	Arena: Le Colisée; Attendance: 4,400; Referees: Ademir Zurapović (BIH), Paulo Marques (POR), Boris Krejić (SLO)

Starters:			Pts	Reb	Ast
PG	25	(United States) Jordan Theodore	12	4	7
SG	23	(United States) Quantez Robertson	0	5	2
SF	42	(Canada) Aaron Doornekamp	6	4	0
PF	21	(Germany) Danilo Barthel	6	10	1
C	17	(Germany) Johannes Voigtmann	16	7	1
Reserves:					
G	7	(Germany) Konstantin Klein	2	3	1
SG	9	(United States) John Little	2	1	0
C	24	(United States) Michael Morrison	7	3	0
G	30	(Canada) Philip Scrubb	8	5	3
PG	10	(Germany) Max Merz	DNP		
PF	22	(Germany) Johannes Richter	DNP		
Head coach:
(Canada Basketball) Gordon Herbert

Skyliners	Enisey

Starters:			Pts	Reb	Ast
PG	4	(Russia) Alexey Vzdykhalkin	5	3	1
SG	21	(United States) Tony Taylor	12	2	3
SF	9	(United States) D.J. Kennedy	12	10	5
PF	5	(Guyana) Delroy James	6	10	0
C	8	(Germany) Tim Ohlbrecht	3	3	1
Reserves:					
PG	13	(Russia) Denis Zakharov	0	1	0
G	7	(Russia) Andrei Komarovskiy	0	1	0
G	10	(Russia) Pavel Sergeev	13	0	0
F	17	(Russia) Artem Yakovenko	5	3	0
F	24	(Russia) Aleksandr Pavlov	0	0	0
G	30	(Russia) Vladimir Pichkurov	DNP		
G	2	(Russia) Artem Isakov	DNP		
Head coach:
(Russian Basketball Federation) Oleg Okulov

== Third place game ==
1 May 2016	Élan Chalon (France)	103–72	(Russia) Enisey	Chalon-sur-Saône
18:00	Scoring by quarter: 27–21, 32–15, 25–11, 19–25
	Pts: Evtimov 19; Rebs: Booker, Evtimov 8 Asts: three players 5	Report	Pts: Taylor 18; Rebs: Yakovenko 8 Asts: James 3	Arena: Le Colisée; Attendance: 4,950; Referees: Paulo Marques (POR), Andrei Sharapa (BLR), Boris Krejić (SLO)

Starters:			Pts	Reb	Ast
PG	21	(United States) John Roberson	6	1	5
SG	10	(France) William Gradit	8	3	0
SF	5	(United States) Jeremy Hazell	13	3	3
PF	12	(France) Ilian Evtimov	19	8	2
C	31	(United States) Devin Booker	14	8	2
Reserves:					
F	6	(France) David Michineau	2	1	0
F	9	(France) Axel Bouteille	10	4	3
C	11	(France) Mathias Lessort	12	5	5
PF	32	(United States) Justin Brownlee	6	1	1
SG	4	(United States) Tyler Kalinoski	11	2	5
C	14	(Senegal) Abdoulaye Ndoye	DNP		
SG	28	(France) Assane Ndoye	2	0	0
Head coach:
(French Federation of Basketball) Jean-Denys Choulet

Chalon	Enisey

Starters:			Pts	Reb	Ast
PG	13	(Russia) Denis Zakharov	8	0	0
SG	21	(United States) Tony Taylor	18	5	2
SF	9	(United States) D.J. Kennedy	8	4	2
PF	5	(Guyana) Delroy James	8	5	3
C	17	(Russia) Artem Yakovenko	10	8	1
Reserves:					
C	8	(Germany) Tim Ohlbrecht	DNP		
PG	4	(Russia) Alexey Vzdykhalkin	5	2	1
G	7	(Russia) Andrei Komarovskiy	0	3	0
G	10	(Russia) Pavel Sergeev	9	1	2
F	24	(Russia) Aleksandr Pavlov	0	2	0
G	30	(Russia) Vladimir Pichkurov	0	2	0
G	2	(Russia) Artem Isakov	4	0	1
Head coach:
(Russian Basketball Federation) Oleg Okulov

== Final ==
"We were in control for 35 minutes and that makes this pill harder to swallow" – Paolo Moretti, Varese head coach

This was Skyliners Frankfurt's first chance to win a European title ever in its club history. For Varese, this was already the 13th appearance in the Final of a European club competition; the Italians won the FIBA European Champions Cup (5 times) and FIBA Saporta Cup (2 times) before. However, Varese's last European victory was back in 1980.

Fraport Skyliners clawed their way back from a 12-point third-quarter deficit to edge out OpenjobMetis Varese 66–62 in a gripping FIBA Europe Cup final and lift the first European trophy in club history. Quantez Robertson of Fraport, who scored 15 points in the Final, was named Final Four MVP.

1 May 2016	Openjobmetis Varese (Italy)	62–66	(Germany) Fraport Skyliners	Chalon-sur-Saône
20:30	Scoring by quarter: 16–15, 15–10, 16–13, 15–28
	Pts: Wayns 16; Rebs: Davies 7 Asts: Cavaliero 4	Report	Pts: Robertson 15; Rebs: Barthel 10; Asts: Robertson 4	Arena: Le Colisée; Attendance: 4,950; Referees: Emin Moğulkoç (TUR), Janusz Calik (POL), Martin Horozov (BUL)

Starters:			Pts	Reb	Ast
PG	2	(United States) Maalik Wayns	16	5	0
SG	11	(United States) Christopher Wright	13	2	2
SF	14	(Estonia) Kristjan Kangur	7	5	2
PF	30	(Latvia) Rihards Kuksiks	6	6	1
C	0	(United States) Brandon Davies	3	7	3
Reserves:					
G	10	(Italy) Daniele Cavaliero	3	4	4
F/C	12	(Italy) Luca Campani	6	4	0
F	21	(Italy) Giancarlo Ferrero	2	0	0
F	23	(Italy) Umberto Pietrini	DNP		
G	15	(Italy) Manuel Rossi	DNP		
G	6	(Lithuania) Ovidijus Varanauskas	DNP		
G	7	(Italy) Filippo Testa	DNP		
Head coach:
(Italian Basketball Federation) Paolo Moretti

Varese	Skyliners

Starters:			Pts	Reb	Ast
PG	25	(United States) Jordan Theodore	13	2	2
SG	23	(United States) Quantez Robertson	15	5	4
SF	42	(Canada) Aaron Doornekamp	5	1	1
PF	21	(Germany) Danilo Barthel	6	10	1
C	17	(Germany) Johannes Voigtmann	9	6	2
Reserves:					
G	7	(Germany) Konstantin Klein	0	0	2
SG	9	(United States) John Little	6	8	0
C	24	(United States) Michael Morrison	7	3	0
G	30	(Canada) Philip Scrubb	6	3	2
PG	10	(Germany) Max Merz	DNP		
PF	22	(Germany) Johannes Richter	DNP		
Head coach:
(Canada Basketball) Gordon Herbert

- Team captains (C): (Italy) Daniele Cavaliero (Varese) and (United States) Quantez Robertson (Frankfurt Skyliners)

== Final Four MVP ==
Player	Team
(United States) Quantez Robertson	(Germany) Fraport Skyliners

== See also ==
- 2016 Euroleague Final Four
- 2016 Eurocup Finals
