= 2016 FIBA Intercontinental Cup =

Fraport Skyliners	Guaros de Lara
(Germany)	(Venezuela)
69	74
- Date: September 18, 2016
- Venue: Fraport Arena, Frankfurt
- MVP: (United States) Zach Graham
- Attendance: 5,002

The 2016 FIBA Intercontinental Cup was the 26th edition of the FIBA Intercontinental Cup. The game was contested by the 2016 FIBA Americas League champions (the top-tier level of Latin America champions), Guaros de Lara, and the 2015–16 FIBA Europe Cup champions, Fraport Skyliners, who at the time were the 3rd-tier level champions of Europe (FIBA Europe Cup is currently Europe's 4th-tier level league). The champions of the 2015–16 EuroLeague, who would normally represent Europe in the FIBA Intercontinental Cup (EuroLeague is the top-tier level European-wide-league), CSKA Moscow, did not participate in the tournament, as a result of the 2015–17 FIBA–Euroleague Basketball controversy.

The 2016 FIBA Intercontinental Cup was played with a single-game format, in Frankfurt, on 18 September 2016.

== Qualified teams ==
Team	Qualification	Qualified date	Participations (bold indicates winners)
(Germany) Fraport Skyliners	Winners of the 2015–16 FIBA Europe Cup	1 May 2016	Debut
(Venezuela) Guaros de Lara	Winners of 2016 FIBA Americas League	12 March 2016	Debut

== Venue ==
When the event was announced, it was also announced that the game would be played in the Fraport Arena, the home arena of the Skyliners. Fraport Arena is an arena in Frankfurt, Germany. It is primarily used for basketball, and it is the home arena of Fraport Skyliners. The arena opened in 1986, and it has a seating capacity of 5,002 people. It also hosts the annual indoor football tournament, with six teams from the region, such as Eintracht Frankfurt and Kickers Offenbach.

Frankfurt	2016 FIBA Intercontinental Cup (Europe)
Fraport Arena	2016 FIBA Intercontinental Cup (Europe)
Capacity: 5,002	2016 FIBA Intercontinental Cup (Europe)

== Match details ==
The game was close for the most part of it, but in the end, Guaros proved to be too much for the Skyliners. In the game's final minute, Zach Graham hit a lay-up, and that was followed by a Heissler Guillent three pointer, which sealed the victory for Guaros. Zach Graham, who scored 19 points in the game, was named the FIBA Intercontinental Cup Most Valuable Player.

18 September 2016	Fraport Skyliners (Germany)	69–**74**	**(Venezuela) Guaros de Lara**	Frankfurt, Germany
15:30	Scoring by quarter: 16–19, 23–13, 13–19, 17–23
	Pts: Shields 16; Rebs: Shields 7 Asts: Starks 5	Boxscore	Pts: Graham 19; Rebs: Colmenares 5 Asts: Guillent 4	Arena: Fraport Arena; Attendance: 5,002; Referees: Jorge Vázquez (PUR), Oļegs Latiševs (LAT), Piotr Pastusiak (POL)

Starters:			Pts	Reb	Ast
PG	5	(United States) Markel Starks	11	5	6
SG	23	(United States) Quantez Robertson	12	6	3
SF	12	(Germany) Stefan Ilzhöfer	3	2	0
PF	41	(Germany) Niklas Kiel	5	1	1
C	24	(United States) Mike Morrison	8	3	1
Reserves:					
F/C	6	(Germany) Mahir Agva	4	3	3
G/F	31	(Denmark) Shavon Shields	16	7	2
G	22	(United States) Antonio Graves	8	2	3
PG	10	(Germany) Max Merz	2	0	0
C	13	(Germany) Garai Zeeb	DNP		
G/F	17	(Germany) Isaac Bonga	DNP		
C	60	(Germany) Konstantin Schubert	DNP		
Head coach:
(Canada Basketball) Gordie Herbert

**Skyliners**	**Guaros de Lara**

2016 Intercontinental Cup champions

**Guaros de Lara**
(1st title)

Starters:			Pts	Reb	Ast
PG	19	(Venezuela) Heissler Guillent	10	2	4
G/F	32	(United States) Zach Graham	19	0	2
G/F	2	(United States) Damion James	17	4	2
PF	43	(Venezuela) Néstor Colmenares	2	5	2
C	0	(Venezuela) Gregory Echenique	8	3	1
Reserves:					
G/F	30	(Serbia) Branko Cvetković	6	3	4
SF	41	(United States) Davon Jefferson	4	1	1
G	25	(Mexico) Lucas Martínez	5	2	0
F/C	6	(Venezuela) Windi Graterol	3	2	2
F/C	11	(Venezuela) Luis Bethelmy	0	0	0
G	20	(Venezuela) Yohanner Sifontes	0	0	0
G	24	(Venezuela) José Ascanio	0	0	0
Head coach:
(Spanish Basketball Federation) Iván Déniz

== MVP ==
- (United States) Zach Graham - ( (Venezuela) Guaros de Lara)
