= 2015–16 FIBA Europe Cup =

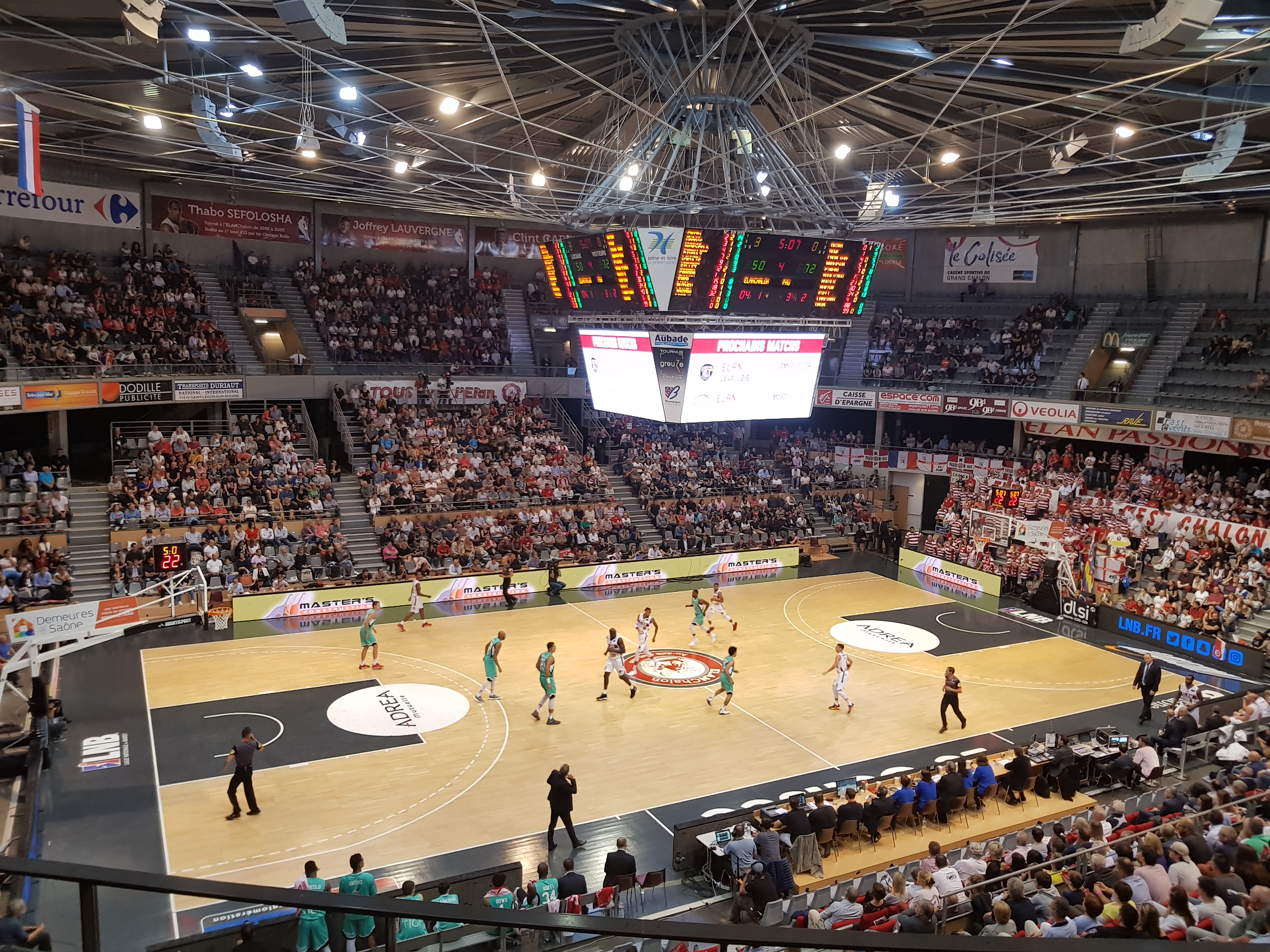
- The Final Four was hosted at Le Colisée
- Season: 2015–16
- Duration: 21 October 2015 – 1 May 2016
- Games played: 286
- Teams: 56

Finals
- Champions: (Germany) Fraport Skyliners (1st title)
- Runners-up: (Italy) Openjobmetis Varese
- Third place: (France) Élan Chalon
- Fourth place: (Russia) Enisey
- Final Four MVP: (United States) Quantez Robertson

Statistical leaders
Points	(Palestine) Omar Krayem	20.4
Rebounds	(Sweden) Christian Maråker	10.3
Assists	(Finland) Teemu Rannikko	10.1

Seasons
- ← 2014–15 EuroChallenge 2016–17 →

The 2015–16 FIBA Europe Cup was the inaugural season of the newly formed basketball competition organised by FIBA. The season started on 21 October 2015 and ended on 1 May 2016.

The competition replaced the FIBA EuroChallenge and had the aim to take the place of Eurocup (organised by Euroleague Basketball), as the second-tier competition in Europe.

== Format ==
In the Regular season, 56 teams are divided into 14 groups of four teams. In the Round of 32, the first and second best teams from the Regular season play in groups of four. Starting from the Round of 16, quarter-finals will be played. The tournament will conclude with a Final Four.

== Teams ==
The deadline to register in the competition was on July 30. The official list of teams was announced on August 3.

Regular season
Conference 1		Conference 2	
(France) ASVEL (6th)	(Czech Republic) ČEZ Nymburk (1st)	(Ukraine) Khimik (1st)	(Bulgaria) Lukoil Academic (1st)
(France) STB Le Havre (7th)	(Sweden) Södertälje Kings (1st)	(Kosovo) Sigal Prishtina (1st)	(Bulgaria) Rilski Sportist (4th)
(France) Élan Chalon (8th)	(Sweden) Borås (3rd)	(Kazakhstan) Astana (1st)	(Poland) PGE Turów (2nd)
(Italy) Cantù (7th)	(Denmark) Bakken Bears (2nd)	(Lithuania) Juventus (3rd)	(Poland) Rosa Radom (4th)
(Italy) Openjobmetis Varese (11th)	(Germany) Fraport Skyliners (6th)	(Lithuania) Pieno Žvaigždės (5th)	(Poland) Śląsk Wrocław (6th)
(Hungary) Sopron (4th)	(Netherlands) SPM Shoeters Den Bosch (1st)	(Lithuania) Šiauliai (7th)	(Romania) Energia Târgu Jiu (3rd)
(Hungary) Falco Szombathely (6th)	(Netherlands) Donar (2nd)	(Estonia) Tartu Ülikool/Rock (1st)	(Slovenia) Helios Suns (4th) ^{c}
(Hungary) Egis Körmend (10th)	(Netherlands) ZZ Leiden (3rd)	(Estonia) Kalev Cramo (2nd)	(Latvia) Ventspils (2nd)
(Portugal) Benfica (1st)	(Croatia) Cibona (2nd)	(Finland) Kataja (1st)	(Israel) Maccabi Rishon LeZion (4th)
(Portugal) Porto (1st) ^{a}	(Slovenia) Tajfun (1st)	(Finland) KTP (3rd)	(Belarus) Tsmoki-Minsk (1st)
(Belgium) Telenet Oostende (1st)	(Slovenia) Krka (3rd)	(Turkey) Türk Telekom (7th)	(Russia) Enisey (11th)
(Belgium) Belfius Mons-Hainaut (2nd)	(Slovenia) Zlatorog Laško (5th)	(Turkey) Royal Halı Gaziantep (10th)	(Slovakia) Rieker Komárno (1st)
(Belgium) Port of Antwerp Giants (6th)	(Austria) Magnofit Güssing Knights (1st)	(Cyprus) Petrolina AEK Larnaca (1st)	(Slovakia) Inter Bratislava (3rd)
(Republic of Ireland) Hibernia ^{b}	(Austria) ece Bulls Kapfenberg (3rd)	(Cyprus) ETHA Engomis (4th)	(North Macedonia) Kumanovo (2nd)

Numbers in bracket represent the place the team took in its 2014–15 domestic championship, representing rankings after eventual Playoffs.

Notes
^a Porto played last season in the Portuguese second tier, Proliga.
^b Hibernia was a newly created team, established by Basketball Ireland to compete in the competition.
^c FIBA Europe announced that the Romanian club BC Timișoara have withdrawn their participation in the competition. Helios Suns replaced the team.

== Draw ==
The draw was held on August 4, 2015 in Munich, Germany. The seeding was prepared on the basis of the clubs' participation and results in European Club Competition in recent years as well as the clubs' ranking in their respective domestic leagues last season. Teams from the same country could not be drawn against each other.

=== Conference 1 ===
Pot 1 Team (Belgium) Telenet Oostende (Croatia) Cibona (Czech Republic) ČEZ Nymburk (France) ASVEL (France) Élan Chalon (Germany) Fraport Skyliners (Italy) FoxTown Cantù	Pot 2 Team (Belgium) Belfius Mons-Hainaut (Belgium) Port of Antwerp Giants (Denmark) Bakken Bears (France) STB Le Havre (Netherlands) SPM Shoeters Den Bosch (Slovenia) Krka (Sweden) Södertälje Kings	Pot 3 Team (Austria) Magnofit Güssing Knights (Italy) Pallacanestro Varese (Netherlands) Donar (Netherlands) ZZ Leiden (Portugal) Benfica (Sweden) Borås (Slovenia) Tajfun	Pot 4 Team (Austria) ece Bulls Kapfenberg (Hungary) Sopron (Hungary) Falco KC Szombathely (Hungary) Egis Körmend (Republic of Ireland) Hibernia (Portugal) FC Porto (Slovenia) Zlatorog Laško

=== Conference 2 ===
Pot 1 Team (Belarus) Tsmoki-Minsk (Estonia) Tartu Ülikool/Rock (Estonia) Kalev Cramo (Poland) PGE Turów (Romania) Energia Târgu Jiu (Turkey) Türk Telekom (Turkey) Royal Halı Gaziantep	Pot 2 Team (Finland) Kataja (Finland) KTP (Kazakhstan) Astana (Latvia) Ventspils (Lithuania) Šiauliai (Russia) Enisey (Ukraine) Khimik	Pot 3 Team (Bulgaria) Lukoil Academic (Bulgaria) Rilski Sportist (Cyprus) Petrolina AEK Larnaca (Cyprus) ETHA Engomis (Poland) Rosa Radom (Poland) Śląsk Wrocław (Slovenia) Helios Suns	Pot 4 Team (Israel) Maccabi Rishon LeZion (Kosovo) Sigal Prishtina (Lithuania) Juventus (Lithuania) Pieno žvaigždės (North Macedonia) Kumanovo 2009 (Slovakia) Rieker Komárno (Slovakia) Inter Bratislava

== Regular season ==
Location of teams of the 2015–16 FIBA Europe Cup regular season.
Red: Group A; Yellow: Group B; Green: Group C; Dark Green: Group D;
Purple: Group E; Pink: Group F; Blue: Group G; Orange: Group H;
Brown: Group I; Deep pink: Group J. Cyan: Group K; Spring green: Group L.
Black: Group M. White: Group N.

The regular season was played between 21 October and 2 December 2015. The top two teams of each group and the four best third-placed teams of all groups (two teams from each Conference) advanced to the Round of 32.

If teams in the same group finished tied on points at the end of the Regular Season, tiebreakers were applied in the following order:

1. Head-to-head record.
2. Head-to-head point differential.
3. Point differential during the regular season.
4. Points scored during the regular season.
5. Sum of quotients of points scored and points allowed in each regular season match.

=== Group A ===
Pos	Team	Pld	W	L	PF	PA	PD	Pts	Qualification	ADE	MON	DON	KÖR
1	(France) ASVEL	6	5	1	514	416	+98	11	Advanced to Round of 32	—	87–66	81–45	83–64
2	(Belgium) Belfius Mons-Hainaut	6	3	3	489	468	+21	9	Advanced to Round of 32	89–81	—	90–76	103–70
3	(Netherlands) Donar	6	2	4	414	477	−63	8		66–85	77–75	—	78–71
4	(Hungary) Egis Körmend	6	2	4	443	499	−56	8		86–97	77–66	75–72	—

Source: FIBA Europe Cup
Legend: Blue = home team win; Red = away team win.

=== Group B ===
Pos	Team	Pld	W	L	PF	PA	PD	Pts	Qualification	ANT	CIB	LIS	SOP
1	(Belgium) Port of Antwerp Giants	6	6	0	499	428	+71	12	Advanced to Round of 32	—	82–69	84–76	81–73
2	(Croatia) Cibona	6	3	3	453	473	−20	9	Advanced to Round of 32	78–92	—	74–66	77–63
3	(Portugal) Benfica	6	2	4	467	447	+20	8		77–79	79–83	—	91–62
4	(Hungary) Sopron	6	1	5	409	480	−71	7		55–81	91–72	65–78	—

Source: FIBA Europe Cup
Legend: Blue = home team win; Red = away team win.

=== Group C ===
Pos	Team	Pld	W	L	PF	PA	PD	Pts	Qualification	TEL	VAR	KIN	FAL
1	(Belgium) Telenet Oostende	6	4	2	473	438	+35	10	Advanced to Round of 32	—	79–85	80–77	91–62
2	(Italy) Openjobmetis Varese	6	3	3	493	459	+34	9	Advanced to Round of 32	79–83	—	76–61	94–71
3	(Sweden) Södertälje Kings	6	3	3	438	439	−1	9	Advanced to Round of 32	71–54	90–86	—	54–62
4	(Hungary) Falco Szombathely	6	2	4	415	483	−68	8		64–86	75–73	81–85	—

Source: FIBA Europe Cup
Legend: Blue = home team win; Red = away team win.

=== Group D ===
Pos	Team	Pld	W	L	PF	PA	PD	Pts	Qualification	ÉLA	MAG	SPM	ZLA
1	(France) Élan Chalon	6	5	1	530	438	+92	11	Advanced to Round of 32	—	88–83	72–66	86–53
2	(Austria) Magnofit Güssing Knights	6	3	3	470	478	−8	9	Advanced to Round of 32	75–99	—	69–74	73–71
3	(Netherlands) SPM Shoeters Den Bosch	6	2	4	421	449	−28	8		73–98	66–72	—	81–73
4	(Slovenia) Zlatorog Laško	6	2	4	430	486	−56	8		88–87	80–98	65–61	—

Source: FIBA Europe Cup
Legend: Blue = home team win; Red = away team win.

=== Group E ===
Pos	Team	Pld	W	L	PF	PA	PD	Pts	Qualification	STB	CTU	BOR	KAP
1	(France) STB Le Havre	6	4	2	455	431	+24	10	Advanced to Round of 32	—	82–78	87–76	70–57
2	(Italy) FoxTown Cantù	6	3	3	502	484	+18	9	Advanced to Round of 32	73–64	—	94–72	85–70
3	(Sweden) Borås	6	3	3	492	504	−12	9	Advanced to Round of 32	74–80	101–81	—	84–82
4	(Austria) ece Bulls Kapfenberg	6	2	4	457	487	−30	8		73–72	95–91	80–85	—

Source: FIBA Europe Cup
Legend: Blue = home team win; Red = away team win.

=== Group F ===
Pos	Team	Pld	W	L	PF	PA	PD	Pts	Qualification	BAK	ČEZ	TAJ	HIB
1	(Denmark) Bakken Bears	6	6	0	485	398	+87	12	Advanced to Round of 32	—	82–79	72–68	96–60
2	(Czech Republic) ČEZ Nymburk	6	4	2	543	375	+168	10	Advanced to Round of 32	64–66	—	103–81	106–45
3	(Slovenia) Tajfun	6	2	4	440	452	−12	8		60–79	56–70	—	82–55
4	(Republic of Ireland) Hibernia	6	0	6	345	588	−243	6		67–90	45–121	73–93	—

Source: FIBA Europe Cup
Legend: Blue = home team win; Red = away team win.

=== Group G ===
Pos	Team	Pld	W	L	PF	PA	PD	Pts	Qualification	SKY	KRK	FCP	ZZL
1	(Germany) Fraport Skyliners	6	6	0	444	385	+59	12	Advanced to Round of 32	—	67–65	89–81	63–58
2	(Slovenia) Krka	6	4	2	459	423	+36	10	Advanced to Round of 32	72–82	—	70–62	79–51
3	(Portugal) FC Porto	6	2	4	431	426	+5	8		58–67	83–87	—	77–51
4	(Netherlands) ZZ Leiden	6	0	6	351	451	−100	6		51–76	78–86	62–70	—

Source: FIBA Europe Cup
Legend: Blue = home team win; Red = away team win.

=== Group H ===
Pos	Team	Pld	W	L	PF	PA	PD	Pts	Qualification	MRL	ENI	LUK	KAL
1	(Israel) Maccabi Rishon LeZion	6	4	2	457	433	+24	10	Advanced to Round of 32	—	68–72	72–77	67–66
2	(Russia) Enisey	6	4	2	463	452	+11	10	Advanced to Round of 32	67–74	—	76–68	77–70
3	(Bulgaria) Lukoil Academic	6	4	2	458	465	−7	10	Advanced to Round of 32	70–84	85–81	—	80–78
4	(Estonia) Kalev Cramo	6	0	6	457	485	−28	6		81–92	87–91	75–78	—

Source: FIBA Europe Cup
Legend: Blue = home team win; Red = away team win.

=== Group I ===
Pos	Team	Pld	W	L	PF	PA	PD	Pts	Qualification	VEN	PŽV	TUR	DOM
1	(Latvia) Ventspils	6	6	0	522	446	+76	12	Advanced to Round of 32	—	86–67	96–73	67–62
2	(Lithuania) Pieno žvaigždės	6	3	3	483	495	−12	9	Advanced to Round of 32	96–100	—	74–71	80–71
3	(Poland) PGE Turów	6	2	4	454	489	−35	8		76–92	90–80	—	86–97
4	(Slovenia) Helios Suns	6	1	5	429	458	−29	7		72–81	71–80	50–88	—

Source: FIBA Europe Cup
Legend: Blue = home team win; Red = away team win.

=== Group J ===
Pos	Team	Pld	W	L	PF	PA	PD	Pts	Qualification	TUR	ROS	KUM	KTP
1	(Turkey) Türk Telekom	6	6	0	555	424	+131	12	Advanced to Round of 32	—	89–72	93–71	108–66
2	(Poland) Rosa Radom	6	4	2	505	445	+60	10	Advanced to Round of 32	68–84	—	84–75	95–48
3	(North Macedonia) Kumanovo 2009	6	1	5	464	516	−52	7		75–84	73–89	—	88–78
4	(Finland) KTP	6	1	5	428	567	−139	7		72–97	76–97	88–82	—

Source: FIBA Europe Cup
Legend: Blue = home team win; Red = away team win.

=== Group K ===
Pos	Team	Pld	W	L	PF	PA	PD	Pts	Qualification	ENE	AEK	AST	PRI
1	(Romania) Energia Târgu Jiu	6	5	1	495	448	+47	11	Advanced to Round of 32	—	87–82	89–72	87–72
2	(Cyprus) Petrolina AEK Larnaca	6	3	3	498	462	+36	9	Advanced to Round of 32	71–75	—	87–68	101–84
3	(Kazakhstan) Astana	6	2	4	458	498	−40	8		85–95	78–74	—	82–78
4	(Kosovo) KB Prishtina	6	2	4	445	488	−43	8		66–62	70–83	75–73	—

Source: FIBA Europe Cup
Legend: Blue = home team win; Red = away team win.

=== Group L ===
Pos	Team	Pld	W	L	PF	PA	PD	Pts	Qualification	KHI	TÜR	JUV	ETH
1	(Ukraine) Khimik	6	6	0	482	396	+86	12	Advanced to Round of 32	—	81–56	80–72	88–52
2	(Estonia) Tartu Ülikool/Rock	6	3	3	417	412	+5	9	Advanced to Round of 32	61–63	—	81–72	92–75
3	(Lithuania) Juventus	6	3	3	484	437	+47	9	Advanced to Round of 32	86–90	66–60	—	94–67
4	(Cyprus) ETHA Engomis	6	0	6	377	515	−138	6		69–80	55–67	59–94	—

Source: FIBA Europe Cup
Legend: Blue = home team win; Red = away team win.

=== Group M ===
Pos	Team	Pld	W	L	PF	PA	PD	Pts	Qualification	GAZ	SLK	SIA	INT
1	(Turkey) Royal Halı Gaziantep	6	4	2	466	396	+70	10	Advanced to Round of 32	—	74–46	87–71	89–72
2	(Poland) Śląsk Wrocław	6	4	2	448	462	−14	10	Advanced to Round of 32	73–68	—	71–69	80–75
3	(Lithuania) Šiauliai	6	3	3	508	489	+19	9		72–69	80–97	—	116–80
4	(Slovakia) Inter Bratislava	6	1	5	470	545	−75	7		62–79	96–81	85–100	—

Source: FIBA Europe Cup
Legend: Blue = home team win; Red = away team win.

=== Group N ===
Pos	Team	Pld	W	L	PF	PA	PD	Pts	Qualification	TSM	KAT	RIL	RIE
1	(Belarus) Tsmoki-Minsk	6	5	1	548	486	+62	11	Advanced to Round of 32	—	82–88	95–91	98–67
2	(Finland) Kataja	6	4	2	519	486	+33	10	Advanced to Round of 32	84–86	—	92–76	87–83
3	(Bulgaria) Rilski Sportist	6	2	4	502	537	−35	8		88–97	87–83	—	83–82
4	(Slovakia) Rieker Komárno	6	1	5	460	520	−60	7		68–90	72–85	88–77	—

Source: FIBA Europe Cup
Legend: Blue = home team win; Red = away team win.

=== Ranking of third-placed teams ===
==== Conference 1 ====
Pos	Grp	Team	Pld	W	L	PF	PA	PD	Pts	Qualification
1	C	(Sweden) Södertälje Kings	6	3	3	438	439	−1	9	Advanced to Round of 32
2	E	(Sweden) Borås	6	3	3	492	504	−12	9	Advanced to Round of 32
3	B	(Portugal) Benfica	6	2	4	467	447	+20	8	
4	G	(Portugal) FC Porto	6	2	4	431	426	+5	8	
5	F	(Slovenia) Tajfun	6	2	4	440	452	−12	8	
6	D	(Netherlands) SPM Shoeters Den Bosch	6	2	4	421	449	−28	8	
7	A	(Netherlands) Donar	6	2	4	414	477	−63	8	

Source: Group results
Rules for classification: 1) Points; 2) Superior point difference; 3) Higher number of point scored

==== Conference 2 ====
Pos	Grp	Team	Pld	W	L	PF	PA	PD	Pts	Qualification
1	H	(Bulgaria) Lukoil Academic	6	4	2	458	465	−7	10	Advanced to Round of 32
2	L	(Lithuania) Juventus	6	3	3	484	437	+47	9	Advanced to Round of 32
3	M	(Lithuania) Šiauliai	6	3	3	508	489	+19	9	
4	N	(Bulgaria) Rilski Sportist	6	2	4	502	537	−35	8	
5	I	(Poland) PGE Turów	6	2	4	454	489	−35	8	
6	K	(Kazakhstan) Astana	6	2	4	458	498	−40	8	
7	J	(North Macedonia) Kumanovo 2009	6	1	5	464	516	−52	7	

Source: Group results
Rules for classification: 1) Points; 2) Superior point difference; 3) Higher number of point scored

== Round of 32 ==
The round of 32 were played between 16 December 2015 and 3 February 2016. The two top teams of each group advanced to the Round of 16.

If teams in the same group finished tied on points at the end of the Round of 32, tiebreakers were applied in the following order:

1. Head-to-head record.
2. Head-to-head point differential.
3. Point differential during the round of 32.
4. Points scored during the round of 32.
5. Sum of quotients of points scored and points allowed in each round of 32 match.

=== Group O ===
Pos	Team	Pld	W	L	PF	PA	PD	Pts	Qualification	ADE	MRL	KRK	KAT
1	(France) ASVEL	6	5	1	474	407	+67	11	Advance to Round of 16	—	81–71	88–60	95–79
2	(Israel) Maccabi Rishon LeZion	6	4	2	502	462	+40	10	Advance to Round of 16	82–71	—	79–61	96–85
3	(Slovenia) Krka	6	2	4	409	469	−60	8		51–67	79–76	—	76–70
4	(Finland) Kataja	6	1	5	472	519	−47	7		64–72	85–93	89–82	—

Source: FIBA Europe Cup
Legend: Blue = home team win; Red = away team win.

=== Group P ===
Pos	Team	Pld	W	L	PF	PA	PD	Pts	Qualification	VEN	ANT	ČEZ	LUK
1	(Latvia) Ventspils	6	4	2	388	386	+2	10	Advance to Round of 16	—	97–80	72–69	77–69
2	(Belgium) Port of Antwerp Giants	6	4	2	406	390	+16	10	Advance to Round of 16	80–78	—	81–79	94–73
3	(Czech Republic) ČEZ Nymburk	6	3	3	383	371	+12	9		88–64	84–57	—	85–78
4	(Bulgaria) Lukoil Academic	6	1	5	359	389	−30	7		62–69	63–71	76–62	—

Source: FIBA Europe Cup
Legend: Blue = home team win; Red = away team win.

=== Group Q ===
Pos	Team	Pld	W	L	PF	PA	PD	Pts	Qualification	TUR	TEL	BOR	SLK
1	(Turkey) Türk Telekom	6	5	1	525	419	+106	11	Advance to Round of 16	—	80–68	92–72	96–68
2	(Belgium) Telenet Oostende	6	5	1	489	435	+54	11	Advance to Round of 16	77–74	—	94–68	75–68
3	(Sweden) Borås	6	2	4	478	545	−67	8		86–114	86–89	—	80–75
4	(Poland) Śląsk Wrocław	6	0	6	399	492	−93	6		48–69	59–86	81–86	—

Source: FIBA Europe Cup
Legend: Blue = home team win; Red = away team win.

=== Group R ===
Pos	Team	Pld	W	L	PF	PA	PD	Pts	Qualification	ÉLA	ENI	CTU	TÜR
1	(France) Élan Chalon	6	5	1	540	493	+47	11	Advance to Round of 16	—	98–88	89–78	76–67
2	(Russia) Enisey	6	3	3	534	518	+16	9	Advance to Round of 16	77–96	—	94–91	87–68
3	(Italy) FoxTown Cantù	6	3	3	525	524	+1	9		103–90	95–92	—	71–76
4	(Estonia) Tartu Ülikool/Rock	6	1	5	444	508	−64	7		80–91	70–96	83–87	—

Source: FIBA Europe Cup
Legend: Blue = home team win; Red = away team win.

=== Group S ===
Pos	Team	Pld	W	L	PF	PA	PD	Pts	Qualification	ENE	CIB	PŽV	STB
1	(Romania) Energia Târgu Jiu	6	3	3	509	498	+11	9	Advance to Round of 16	—	85–81	86–101	78–68
2	(Croatia) Cibona	6	3	3	550	552	−2	9	Advance to Round of 16	93–88	—	82–84	106–113
3	(Lithuania) Pieno žvaigždės	6	3	3	536	539	−3	9		95–93	90–95	—	82–87
4	(France) STB Le Havre	6	3	3	516	522	−6	9		60–79	92–93	96–84	—

Source: FIBA Europe Cup
Legend: Blue = home team win; Red = away team win.

=== Group T ===
Pos	Team	Pld	W	L	PF	PA	PD	Pts	Qualification	JUV	KHI	MON	BAK
1	(Lithuania) Juventus	6	4	2	494	430	+64	10	Advance to Round of 16	—	74–63	103–65	91–67
2	(Ukraine) Khimik	6	4	2	449	424	+25	10	Advance to Round of 16	77–76	—	64–61	81–67
3	(Belgium) Belfius Mons-Hainaut	6	3	3	469	461	+8	9		77–57	95–89	—	90–66
4	(Denmark) Bakken Bears	6	1	5	414	511	−97	7		81–93	51–75	82–81	—

Source: FIBA Europe Cup
Legend: Blue = home team win; Red = away team win.

=== Group U ===
Pos	Team	Pld	W	L	PF	PA	PD	Pts	Qualification	SKY	GAZ	KIN	ROS
1	(Germany) Fraport Skyliners	6	6	0	518	409	+109	12	Advance to Round of 16	—	91–79	95–64	91–61
2	(Turkey) Royal Halı Gaziantep	6	3	3	440	427	+13	9	Advance to Round of 16	66–71	—	76–56	79–70
3	(Sweden) Södertälje Kings	6	2	4	442	496	−54	8		81–95	78–71	—	86–78
4	(Poland) Rosa Radom	6	1	5	409	477	−68	7		58–75	61–69	81–77	—

Source: FIBA Europe Cup
Legend: Blue = home team win; Red = away team win.

=== Group V ===
Pos	Team	Pld	W	L	PF	PA	PD	Pts	Qualification	VAR	AEK	TSM	MAG
1	(Italy) Openjobmetis Varese	6	5	1	480	436	+44	11	Advance to Round of 16	—	74–72	94–63	85–81
2	(Cyprus) Petrolina AEK Larnaca	6	3	3	422	416	+6	9	Advance to Round of 16	65–61	—	73–68	68–59
3	(Belarus) Tsmoki-Minsk	6	3	3	486	488	−2	9		84–89	86–84	—	96–60
4	(Austria) Magnofit Güssing Knights	6	1	5	427	475	−48	7		71–77	68–60	88–89	—

Source: FIBA Europe Cup
Legend: Blue = home team win; Red = away team win.

== Knockout stage ==
Round of 16; 17 February–2 March
(France) ASVEL	0
(Belgium) Port of Antwerp Giants	2
(Italy) Openjobmetis Varese	2
(Turkey) Royal Halı Gaziantep	1
(France) Élan Chalon	2
(Belgium) Telenet Oostende	1
(Romania) Energia Târgu Jiu	1
(Ukraine) Khimik	2
(Latvia) Ventspils	0
(Israel) Maccabi Rishon LeZion	2
(Germany) Fraport Skyliners	2
(Cyprus) Petrolina AEK Larnaca	0
(Turkey) Türk Telekom	0
(Russia) Enisey	2
(Lithuania) Juventus	0
(Croatia) Cibona	2

Quarter-finals; 16–30 March
(Belgium) Port of Antwerp Giants	1
(Italy) Openjobmetis Varese	2
(France) Élan Chalon	2
(Ukraine) Khimik	0
(Israel) Maccabi Rishon LeZion	1
(Germany) Fraport Skyliners	2
(Russia) Enisey	2
(Croatia) Cibona	1

Semifinals; 29 April
(Italy) Openjobmetis Varese	91
(France) Élan Chalon	82
(Germany) Fraport Skyliners	59
(Russia) Enisey	56

Final; 1 May
(Italy) Openjobmetis Varese	62
(Germany) Fraport Skyliners	66
Third place
(France) Élan Chalon	103
(Russia) Enisey	72

=== Round of 16 ===
Game 1 will be played on February 17. Game 2 will be played on February 24. Game 3, if necessary, will be played on March 2.

The eight winners of each series will qualify for the quarterfinals, while the other eight teams will be eliminated.

Team 1	Agg.	Team 2	Game 1	Game 2	Game 3
ASVEL (France)	0–2	(Belgium) Port of Antwerp Giants	67–74	78–88	
Openjobmetis Varese (Italy)	2–1	(Turkey) Royal Halı Gaziantep	82–81	60–76	74–71
Élan Chalon (France)	2–1	(Belgium) Telenet Oostende	84–71	80–91	104–91
Energia Târgu Jiu (Romania)	1–2	(Ukraine) Khimik	77–71	60–71	77–84
Ventspils (Latvia)	0–2	(Israel) Maccabi Rishon LeZion	73–75	85–93	
Fraport Skyliners (Germany)	2–0	(Cyprus) Petrolina AEK Larnaca	83–60	56–44	
Türk Telekom (Turkey)	0–2	(Russia) Enisey	95–96	68–75	
Juventus (Lithuania)	0–2	(Croatia) Cibona	78–83	84–87	

=== Quarter-finals ===
Game 1 will be played on March 16. Game 2 will be played on March 23. Game 3 will be played, if necessary, on March 30. Teams with better record in the Round of 32 had the home advantage.

The four winners of each series will qualify to the Final Four, while the other four teams will be eliminated.

Team 1	Agg.	Team 2	Game 1	Game 2	Game 3
Openjobmetis Varese (Italy)	2–1	(Belgium) Port of Antwerp Giants	92–81	82–93	105–93
Élan Chalon (France)	2–0	(Ukraine) Khimik	115–94	83–79	
Fraport Skyliners (Germany)	2–1	(Israel) Maccabi Rishon LeZion	92–57	84–88	91–75
Enisey (Russia)	2–1	(Croatia) Cibona	94–92	69–77	82–78

=== Final Four ===
On April 6, 2016, Le Colisée in Chalon-sur-Saône was announced as the venue for the Final Four.

Semifinals
29 April
(Italy) Openjobmetis Varese	91
(France) Élan Chalon	82
29 April
(Germany) Fraport Skyliners	59
(Russia) Enisey	56

Final
1 May
(Italy) Openjobmetis Varese	62
(Germany) Fraport Skyliners	66
Third place game
1 May
(France) Élan Chalon	103
(Russia) Enisey	72

== Honours ==
=== Final Four MVP ===
Pos.	Player	Team	Ref.
SG	(United States) Quantez Robertson	(Germany) Fraport Skyliners	

=== Starting Five ===
Pos.	Player	Team	Ref.
PG	(United States) Chris Wright	(Italy) Openjobmetis Varese	
SG	(United States) Kwame Vaughn	(Belgium) Port of Antwerp Giants	
SF	(United States) D.J. Kennedy	(Russia) Enisey	
PF	(United States) Darryl Monroe	(Israel) Maccabi Rishon LeZion	
C	(Croatia) Ante Žižić	(Croatia) Cibona	

== Statistics ==
=== Individual statistic leaders ===
To be considered a statistical leader, players had to have played a minimum of 10 games.

Category	Player	Team	Statistic
Points per game	(Palestine) Omar Krayem	(Sweden) Borås	20.4
Rebounds per game	(Sweden) Christian Maråker	(Sweden) Borås	10.3
Assists per game	(Finland) Teemu Rannikko	(Finland) Kataja	10.1
Steals per game	(Cuba) Howard Sant-Roos	(Czech Republic) ČEZ Nymburk	2.3
Blocks per game	(Nigeria) Callistus Eziukwu	(Romania) Energia Targû Jiu	1.8
Turnovers per game	(Palestine) Omar Krayem	(Sweden) Borås	4.2
Fouls per game	(Lithuania) Egidijus Dimša	(Lithuania) Juventus	3.9
Minutes per game	(United States) Lamayn Wilson	(Finland) Kataja	37.0
FG%	(Croatia) Ante Žižić	(Croatia) Cibona	63.4%
FT%	(Serbia) Dušan Đorđević	(Belgium) Telenet Oostende	94.6%
3FG%	(Lithuania) Steponas Babrauskas	(Lithuania) Pieno žvaigždės	54.2%
Double-doubles	(Sweden) Christian Maråker	(Sweden) Borås	6

Source: FIBA Europe Cup

=== Individual game highs ===
Category	Player	Team	Statistic
Points	(Croatia) Ivica Radić	(Portugal) Benfica	38
Rebounds	(United States) Maurice Sutton	(Poland) Śląsk Wrocław	19
Rebounds	(Canada) Ross Bekkering	(Netherlands) Donar	19
Assists	(Finland) Teemu Rannikko	(Finland) Joensuun Kataja	18
Steals	(United States) Kim Adams	(Poland) Rosa Radom	9
Blocks	(Serbia) Dejan Kravić	(Netherlands) SPM Shoeters Den Bosch	6
Blocks	(Estonia) Janar Talts	(Estonia) Tartu Ülikool/Rock	6
Three pointers	(United States) Devonte Newbill	(France) ASVEL	8
Three pointers	(Canada) Brady Heslip	(Italy) FoxTown Cantù	8
Three pointers	(United States) Thaddus McFadden	(Cyprus) Petrolina AEK Larnaca	8

Source: FIBA Europe Cup

== Finals rosters ==
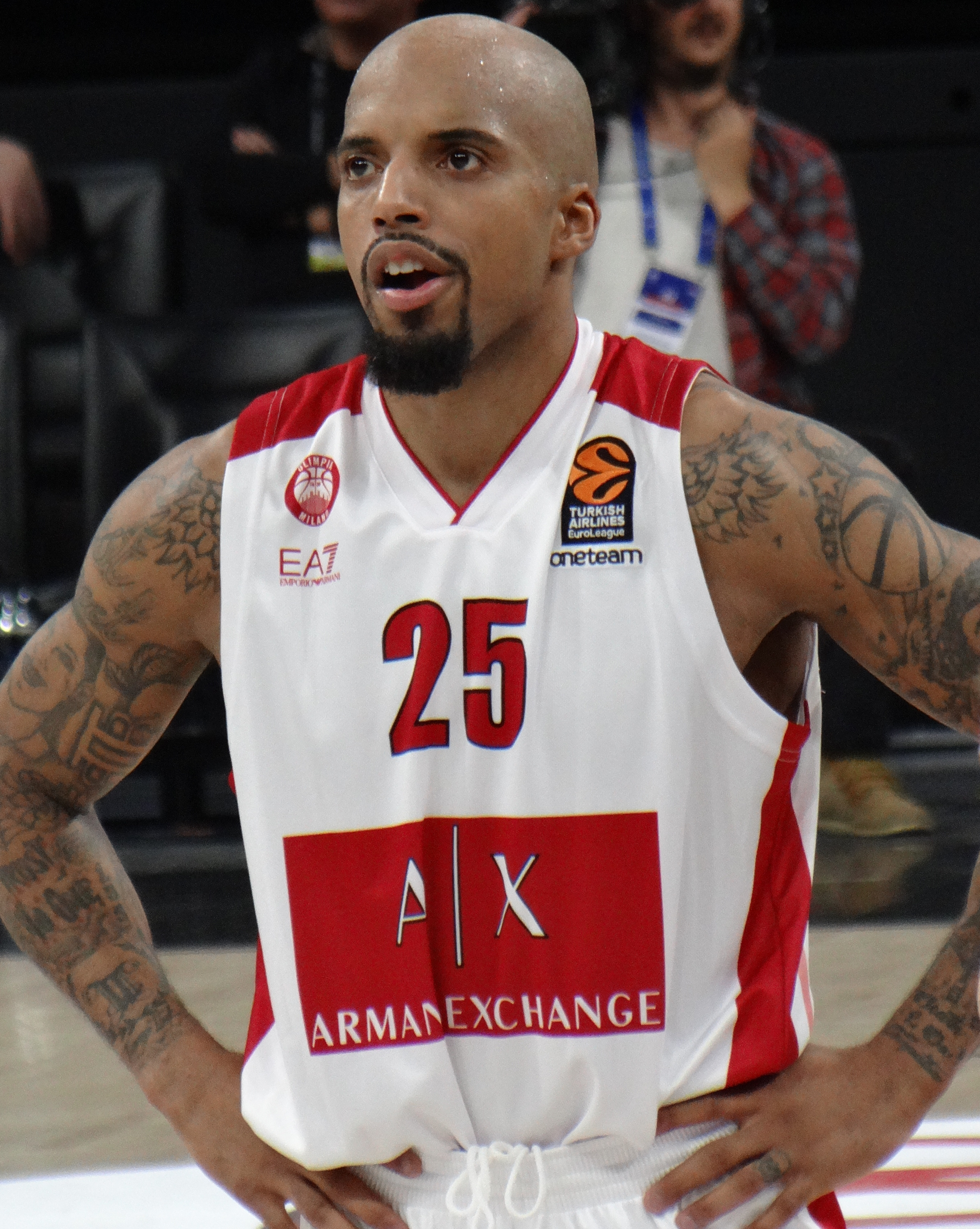
Jordan Theodore won the 2015-16 FIBA Europe Cup with Frankfurt.

(Germany) Fraport Skyliners Frankfurt Jordan Theodore, Quantez Robertson (C), Johannes Voigtmann, Philip Scrubb, Aaron Doornekamp, Danilo Barthel, Mike Morrison, John Little, Konstantin Klein, Johannes Richter, Max Merz, Stefan Ilzhöfer, Tomas Dimša, Tim Oldenburg, Garai Zeeb. Coach: Gordon Herbert
(Italy) Openjobmetis Varese Chris Wright, Brandon Davies, Maalik Wayns, Rihards Kuksiks, Kristjan Kangur, Luca Campani, Daniele Cavaliero (C), Giancarlo Ferrero, Mouhammad Faye, Ovidijus Varanauskas, Lorenzo Molinaro, Manuel Rossi, Umberto Pietrini, Filippo Testa, Jacopo Lepri, Ramon Galloway, Mychel Thompson, Jevohn Shepherd. Coach: Paolo Moretti

== See also ==
- 2015–16 Euroleague
- 2015–16 Eurocup Basketball
