= 2019 Italian Basketball Cup =

Tournament details
- Arena: Nelson Mandela Forum; Florence, Italy
- Dates: 14–17 February 2019

Final positions
- Champions: Vanoli Cremona (1st title)
- Runners-up: New Basket Brindisi

Awards and statistics
- MVP: (United States) Drew Crawford

The 2019 Italian Basketball Cup, known as the 2018 PosteMobile Final Eight for sponsorship reasons, was the 43rd edition of Italy's national cup tournament. The competition is managed by the Lega Basket for LBA clubs. The tournament was played from 14 to 17 February 2019 in Florence, at the end of the first half of the 2018–19 LBA season.

Fiat Torino were the defending champions.

Vanoli Cremona went to win its first Cup ever by beating New Basket Brindisi 83–74 in the Finals. Drew Crawford was named Panasonic MVP of the competition.

== Qualification ==
Qualified for the tournament were selected based on their position on the league table at the end of the first half of the 2018–19 LBA regular season.

Pos	Team	Pld	W	L	PF	PA	PD	Qualification
1	AX Armani Exchange Milano	15	14	1	1359	1196	+163	Qualified as seeded teams
2	Sidigas Avellino	15	11	4	1251	1225	+26	Qualified as seeded teams
3	Umana Reyer Venezia	15	10	5	1218	1061	+157	Qualified as seeded teams
4	Vanoli Cremona	15	10	5	1333	1254	+79	Qualified as seeded teams
5	Openjobmetis Varese	15	9	6	1167	1104	+63	Qualified as non-seeded teams
6	Banco di Sardegna Sassari	15	8	7	1345	1257	+88	Qualified as non-seeded teams
7	New Basket Brindisi	15	8	7	1175	1144	+31	Qualified as non-seeded teams
8	Segafredo Virtus Bologna	15	8	7	1222	1238	−16	Qualified as non-seeded teams

Source: LBA

== Bracket ==
Quarter-finals; 14–15 February
1	AX Armani Exchange Milano	84
8	Segafredo Virtus Bologna	86
4	Vanoli Cremona	82
5	Openjobmetis Varese	73
3	Umana Reyer Venezia	88
6	Banco di Sardegna Sassari	89
2	Sidigas Avellino	92
7	New Basket Brindisi	95

Semifinals; 16 February
8	Segafredo Virtus Bologna	91
4	Vanoli Cremona	102
6	Banco di Sardegna Sassari	86
7	New Basket Brindisi	87

Final; 17 February
4	Vanoli Cremona	83
7	New Basket Brindisi	74

== Quarterfinals ==
=== Vanoli Cremona vs. Openjobmetis Varese ===
14 February 2018 Quarterfinal A	Vanoli Cremona	82–73	Openjobmetis Varese	Florence
18:00 (CET)	Scoring by quarter: 19–15, 25–25, 16–12, 22–21
Eurosport; RAI	Pts: Crawford 22; Rebs: Mathiang 11; Asts: Diener 9 PIR: Saunders 28	Boxscore	Pts: Avramović, Scrubb 15; Rebs: Cain 12; Asts: Avramović, Tambone 3 PIR: Cain 22	Arena: Nelson Mandela Forum; Referees: Tolga Sahin, Maurizio Biggi, Valerio Grigioni

Starters:			Pts	Reb	Ast
PG	7	(Italy) Travis Diener	7	1	9
SG	1	(United States) Wesley Saunders	20	7	2
SF	22	(United States) Drew Crawford	22	5	3
PF	23	(United States) Peyton Aldridge	11	3	0
C	12	(Australia) Mangok Mathiang	5	11	0
Reserves:					
G	2	(Italy) Alessandro Feraboli	DNP		
PF	6	(Italy) Giulio Gazzotti	DNP		
F	8	(Italy) Giampaolo Ricci	2	5	3
PG	10	(Italy) Michele Ruzzier	7	4	3
SG	24	(Serbia) Vojislav Stojanović	8	3	2
Head coach:
(Italian Basketball Federation) Romeo Sacchetti

Vanoli Cremona	Openjobmetis Varese

Starters:			Pts	Reb	Ast
PG	25	(United States) Ronald Moore	3	4	1
SG	4	(Serbia) Aleksa Avramović	15	5	3
SF	11	(Canada) Thomas Scrubb	15	9	0
PF	2	(United States) Dominique Archie	2	3	0
C	16	(United States) Tyler Cain	8	12	0
Reserves:					
G	5	(Italy) Christian Gatto	DNP		
PF	7	(Italy) Antonio Iannuzzi	5	1	0
F	8	(Italy) Nicola Natali	2	0	0
SG	10	(Belgium) Jean Salumu	8	3	1
C	13	(Italy) Damiano Verri	DNP		
PG	15	(Italy) Matteo Tambone	4	2	3
F	21	(Italy) Giancarlo Ferrero	11	0	1
Head coach:
(Italian Basketball Federation) Attilio Caja

=== AX Armani Exchange Milano vs. Segafredo Virtus Bologna ===
14 February 2018 Quarterfinal B	AX Armani Exchange Milano	84–86	Segafredo Virtus Bologna	Florence
21:00 (CET)	Scoring by quarter: 22–17, 14–24, 18–22, 30–23
Eurosport; RAI	Pts: Nunnally 19; Rebs: Brooks 13; Asts: James 5 PIR: Brooks 28	Boxscore	Pts: Taylor 23; Rebs: Moreira 10; Asts: six players 1 PIR: Taylor, M'Baye 19	Arena: Nelson Mandela Forum; Referees: Manuel Mazzoni, Alessandro Martolini, Denny Borgioni

Starters:			Pts	Reb	Ast
PG	2	(United States) Mike James	13	10	5
SG	21	(United States) James Nunnally	19	3	0
SF	5	(Serbia) Vladimir Micov	17	2	2
PF	32	(Italy) Jeff Brooks	11	13	3
C	92	(Slovenia) Alen Omić	4	3	1
Reserves:					
G	6	(Italy) Federico Andrea Ferraris	DNP		
SF	13	(Italy) Simone Fontecchio	0	1	0
PF	19	(Lithuania) Mindaugas Kuzminskas	7	2	1
PG	20	(Italy) Andrea Cinciarini	0	1	0
C	23	(Italy) Christian Burns	4	2	0
PG	55	(United States) Curtis Jerrells	6	0	2
SG	100	(Italy) Amedeo Della Valle	3	3	0
Head coach:
(Italian Basketball Federation) Simone Pianigiani

AX Armani Exchange Milano	Segafredo Virtus Bologna

Starters:			Pts	Reb	Ast
PG	7	(United States) Tony Taylor	23	2	1
SG	0	(United States) Kevin Punter	4	2	0
SF	25	(Italy) David Cournooh	9	4	1
PF	24	(France) Amath M'Baye	14	6	0
C	2	(Angola) Yanick Moreira	14	10	1
Reserves:					
G	1	(United States) Kelvin Martin	2	3	1
PG	6	(Italy) Alessandro Pajola	0	0	1
F	8	(Italy) Filippo Baldi Rossi	0	1	0
PG	9	(Italy) Alessandro Cappelletti	DNP		
G	21	(Italy) Pietro Aradori	15	3	1
C	23	(Italy) Matteo Berti	DNP		
C	41	(United States) Brian Qvale	5	3	0
Head coach:
(Italian Basketball Federation) Stefano Sacripanti

=== Umana Reyer Venezia vs. Banco di Sardegna Sassari ===
15 February 2018 Quarterfinal C	Umana Reyer Venezia	88–89	Banco di Sardegna Sassari	Florence
18:00 (CET)	Scoring by quarter: 29–20, 28–21, 18–25, 13–23
Eurosport; RAI	Pts: Tonut 20; Rebs: Watt 6 Asts: Haynes 8 PIR: Watt 22	Boxscore	Pts: Pierre 24; Rebs: Pierre 9 Asts: Spissu, McGee 2 PIR: Pierre 30	Arena: Nelson Mandela Forum; Referees: Roberto Begnis, Beniamino Manuel Attard, Mark Bartoli

Starters:			Pts	Reb	Ast
PG	0	(Georgia (country)) MarQuez Haynes	11	0	8
SG	7	(Italy) Stefano Tonut	20	1	1
SF	6	(Greece) Michael Bramos	14	3	1
PF	22	(Italy) Valerio Mazzola	6	3	1
C	50	(United States) Mitchell Watt	16	6	4
Reserves:					
SG	5	(United States) Julyan Stone	5	3	1
PF	9	(United States) Austin Daye	9	2	2
PG	10	(Italy) Andrea De Nicolao	3	0	0
SF	17	(United States) Deron Washington	4	1	0
C	19	(Italy) Paul Biligha	0	2	0
G	21	(Italy) Marco Giuri	DNP		
SF	30	(Italy) Bruno Cerella	0	0	0
Head coach:
(Italian Basketball Federation) Walter De Raffaele

Umana Reyer Venezia	Banco di Sardegna Sassari

Starters:			Pts	Reb	Ast
PG	2	(United States) Jaime Smith	15	0	0
SG	21	(United States) Dyshawn Pierre	24	9	1
SF	6	(United States) Justin Carter	4	4	1
PF	33	(Italy) Achille Polonara	10	5	0
C	45	(United States) Jack Cooley	13	7	0
Reserves:					
PG	0	(Italy) Marco Spissu	3	1	2
SG	3	(United States) Tyrus McGee	2	1	2
SF	8	(Italy) Giacomo De Vecchi	2	0	0
C	15	(Italy) Daniele Magro	DNP		
PG	22	(Italy) Stefano Gentile	2	0	0
C	25	(United States) Rashawn Thomas	14	7	1
C	45	(Senegal) Ousmane Diop	0	0	0
Head coach:
(Italian Basketball Federation) Gianmarco Pozzecco

=== Sidigas Avellino vs. New Basket Brindisi ===
15 February 2018 Quarterfinal D	Sidigas Avellino	92–95	New Basket Brindisi	Florence
20:45 (CET)	Scoring by quarter: 12–28, 28–19, 40–22, 12–26
Eurosport; RAI	Pts: Sykes 23; Rebs: Green 11; Asts: Green 8 PIR: Green 36	Boxscore	Pts: Banks 26; Rebs: Brown, Moraschini 7 Asts: Banks 6 PIR: Banks 40	Arena: Nelson Mandela Forum; Referees: Massimiliano Filippini, Alessandro Vicino, Guido Giovannetti

Starters:			Pts	Reb	Ast
PG	12	(Italy) Ariel Filloy	19	3	1
SG	28	(United States) Keifer Sykes	23	6	1
SF	20	(Latvia) Ojārs Siliņš	5	5	2
PF	6	(United States) Caleb Green	19	11	8
C	5	(Senegal) Hamady N'Diaye	8	3	1
Reserves:					
SF	8	(United States) Demetris Nichols	DNP		
C	14	(Italy) Luca Campani	4	0	0
PG	18	(Italy) Antonio Sabatino	DNP		
G	21	(Italy) Luca Campogrande	0	0	0
PG	22	(United States) Demonte Harper	14	4	2
SG	24	(Italy) Lorenzo D'Ercole	0	0	0
PF	34	(Italy) Stefano Spizzichini	0	0	0
Head coach:
(Basketball Federation of Serbia) Nenad Vučinić

Sidigas Avellino	New Basket Brindisi

Starters:			Pts	Reb	Ast
PG	21	(United States) Jeremy Chappell	8	2	1
SG	0	(Israel) Adrian Banks	26	5	6
SF	9	(Italy) Riccardo Moraschini	9	7	5
PF	3	(United States) Tony Gaffney	7	3	2
C	100	(United States) John Brown	22	7	0
Reserves:					
G	1	(Sweden) Erik Rush	10	6	0
PG	6	(Italy) Alessandro Zanelli	0	0	1
G	7	(Italy) Gabriele Orlandino	DNP		
G	11	(United States) Devondrick Walker	11	0	0
G	15	(Italy) Nicolò Cazzolato	DNP		
C	18	(Poland) Jakub Wojciechowski	2	4	1
G	68	(Italy) Vincenzo Taddeo	DNP		
Head coach:
(Italian Basketball Federation) Francesco Vitucci

== Semifinals ==
=== Vanoli Cremona vs. Segafredo Virtus Bologna ===
16 February 2018 Semifinal A	Vanoli Cremona	102–91	Segafredo Virtus Bologna	Florence
18:00 (CET)	Scoring by quarter: 21–20, 38–24, 16–24, 27–23
Eurosport; RAI	Pts: Diener 26; Rebs: Mathiang 10; Asts: Saunders 5 PIR: Mathiang 31	Boxscore	Pts: Aradori 26; Rebs: M'Baye 7 Asts: Aradori 3 PIR: Aradori 27	Arena: Nelson Mandela Forum

Starters:			Pts	Reb	Ast
PG	7	(Italy) Travis Diener	26	1	3
SG	1	(United States) Wesley Saunders	15	5	5
SF	22	(United States) Drew Crawford	19	7	3
PF	23	(United States) Peyton Aldridge	9	3	3
C	12	(Australia) Mangok Mathiang	19	10	1
Reserves:					
G	2	(Italy) Alessandro Feraboli	DNP		
PF	6	(Italy) Giulio Gazzotti	0	0	0
F	8	(Italy) Giampaolo Ricci	6	2	2
PG	10	(Italy) Michele Ruzzier	6	0	1
SG	24	(Serbia) Vojislav Stojanović	2	2	0
Head coach:
(Italian Basketball Federation) Romeo Sacchetti

Vanoli Cremona	Segafredo Virtus Bologna

Starters:			Pts	Reb	Ast
PG	7	(United States) Tony Taylor	14	4	2
SG	0	(United States) Kevin Punter	19	3	0
SF	25	(Italy) David Cournooh	5	0	0
PF	24	(France) Amath M'Baye	9	7	1
C	2	(Angola) Yanick Moreira	4	5	1
Reserves:					
G	1	(United States) Kelvin Martin	4	3	0
PG	6	(Italy) Alessandro Pajola	0	0	2
F	8	(Italy) Filippo Baldi Rossi	0	0	1
PG	9	(Italy) Alessandro Cappelletti	DNP		
C	11	(Serbia) Dejan Kravić	10	5	0
G	21	(Italy) Pietro Aradori	26	6	3
C	23	(Italy) Matteo Berti	DNP		
Head coach:
(Italian Basketball Federation) Stefano Sacripanti

=== Banco di Sardegna Sassari vs. New Basket Brindisi ===
16 February 2018 Semifinal A	Banco di Sardegna Sassari	86–87	New Basket Brindisi	Florence
20:45 (CET)	Scoring by quarter: 28–32, 18–22, 14–20, 26–13
Eurosport; RAI	Pts: Carter 18; Rebs: Cooley 12; Asts: Polonara 3 PIR: Cooley 21	Boxscore	Pts: Brown 20; Rebs: Chappell 9 Asts: Banks 4 PIR: Gaffney 20	Arena: Nelson Mandela Forum; Referees: Saverio Lanzarini, Luca Weidmann, Christian Borgo

Starters:			Pts	Reb	Ast
PG	2	(United States) Jaime Smith	16	2	2
SG	21	(United States) Dyshawn Pierre	16	5	1
SF	6	(United States) Justin Carter	18	7	2
PF	33	(Italy) Achille Polonara	8	6	3
C	45	(United States) Jack Cooley	13	12	1
Reserves:					
PG	0	(Italy) Marco Spissu	0	4	1
SG	3	(United States) Tyrus McGee	8	2	0
SF	8	(Italy) Giacomo De Vecchi	DNP		
C	15	(Italy) Daniele Magro	DNP		
PG	22	(Italy) Stefano Gentile	0	0	0
C	25	(United States) Rashawn Thomas	7	7	1
C	45	(Senegal) Ousmane Diop	DNP		
Head coach:
(Italian Basketball Federation) Gianmarco Pozzecco

Banco di Sardegna Sassari	New Basket Brindisi

Starters:			Pts	Reb	Ast
PG	21	(United States) Jeremy Chappell	18	9	2
SG	0	(Israel) Adrian Banks	15	4	4
SF	9	(Italy) Riccardo Moraschini	28	2	2
PF	3	(United States) Tony Gaffney	9	6	2
C	100	(United States) John Brown	20	4	2
Reserves:					
G	1	(Sweden) Erik Rush	5	2	0
PG	6	(Italy) Alessandro Zanelli	0	1	0
G	8	(Italy) Mattia Calamo	DNP		
G	11	(United States) Devondrick Walker	2	1	0
G	15	(Italy) Nicolò Cazzolato	DNP		
C	18	(Poland) Jakub Wojciechowski	0	1	0
G	68	(Italy) Vincenzo Taddeo	DNP		
Head coach:
(Italian Basketball Federation) Francesco Vitucci

== Final ==
=== Vanoli Cremona vs. New Basket Brindisi ===
17 February 2019	Vanoli Cremona	83–74	New Basket Brindisi	Florence
18:00	Scoring by quarter: 23–18, 22–19, 17–14, 21–23
Eurosport; RAI	Pts: Crawford, Saunders 18; Rebs: Ricci, Saunders 9 Asts: Diener 6 PIR: Saunders 26	Boxscore	Pts: Brown 21; Rebs: Brown 8 Asts: Brown 3 PIR: Brown 25	Arena: Nelson Mandela Forum; Attendance: 6,278; Referees: Tolga Sahin, Michele Rossi, Maurizio Biggi

Starters:			Pts	Reb	Ast
PG	7	(Italy) Travis Diener	8	1	6
SG	1	(United States) Wesley Saunders	18	9	2
SF	22	(United States) Drew Crawford	18	6	0
PF	23	(United States) Peyton Aldridge	11	5	1
C	12	(Australia) Mangok Mathiang	8	8	0
Reserves:					
G	2	(Italy) Alessandro Ariazzi	DNP		
PF	6	(Italy) Giulio Gazzotti	DNP		
F	8	(Italy) Giampaolo Ricci	6	9	1
PG	10	(Italy) Michele Ruzzier	12	1	3
SG	24	(Serbia) Vojislav Stojanović	2	2	1
Head coach:
(Italian Basketball Federation) Romeo Sacchetti

Vanoli Cremona	New Basket Brindisi

Cremona	Statistics	Brindisi
19/42 (45.2%)	2 point field goals	19/41 (46.3%)
13/30 (43.3%)	3 point field goals	8/25 (32.0%)
6/9 (66.7%)	Free throws	12/18 (66.7%)
41	Rebounds	38
14	Assists	12
2	Steals	6
12	Turnovers	13
0	Blocks	3

Starters:			Pts	Reb	Ast
PG	21	(United States) Jeremy Chappell	3	5	2
SG	0	(Israel) Adrian Banks	13	4	2
SF	9	(Italy) Riccardo Moraschini	7	1	0
PF	3	(United States) Tony Gaffney	19	7	1
C	100	(United States) John Brown	21	8	3
Reserves:					
G	1	(Sweden) Erik Rush	0	3	1
PG	6	(Italy) Alessandro Zanelli	0	0	0
G	8	(Italy) Mattia Calamo	DNP		
G	11	(United States) Devondrick Walker	11	5	2
G	15	(Italy) Nicolò Cazzolato	DNP		
C	18	(Poland) Jakub Wojciechowski	0	2	1
G	68	(Italy) Vincenzo Taddeo	DNP		
Head coach:
(Italian Basketball Federation) Francesco Vitucci

2019 Italian Cup champions
Vanoli Cremona
1st title

== Sponsors ==
- PosteMobile (title sponsor)
- Panasonic (main sponsor)
- Fastweb (technology partner)
- Turkish Airlines (official airline)
- Molten (official ball)
- Zurich (top sponsor)
- MyGlass (official partner)
- Prozis (official nutrition partner)
- StarCasinò (Official Gaming Partner)
- Anthea (official broker)
- Erreà (technical sponsor)
- Contadi Castaldi (official wine)
- Eurosport (official broadcaster)
- Rai Sport (official broadcaster)
- Comune di Firenze
