= Tony Taylor (basketball) =

American basketball player (born 1990)

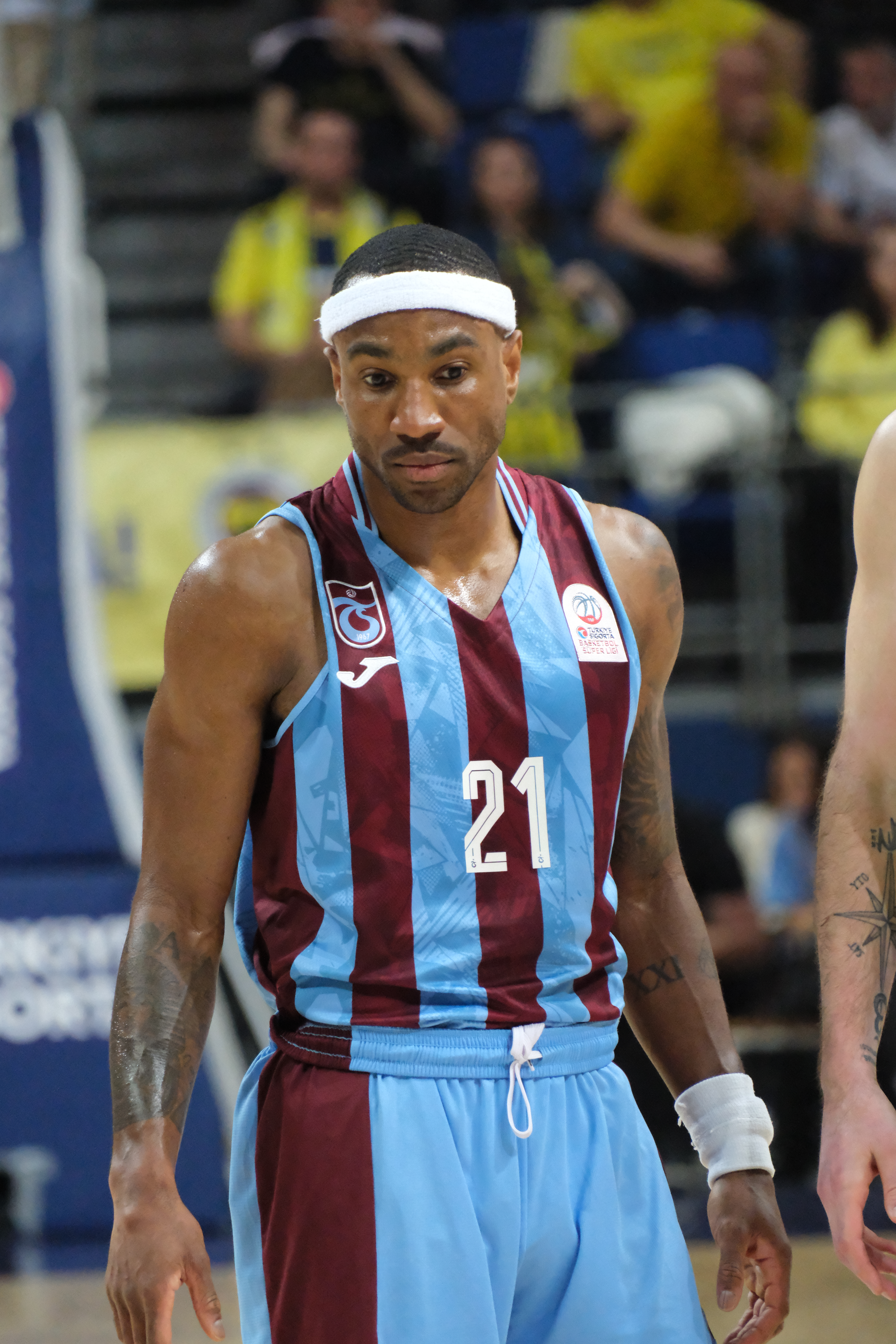
- Taylor with Trabzonspor in 2026

No. 21 – Türk Telekom
- Position: Point guard
- League: BSL; EuroCup

Personal information
- Born: August 9, 1990 (age 36) Sleepy Hollow, New York, U.S.
- Listed height: 6 ft 0 in (1.83 m)
- Listed weight: 191 lb (87 kg)

Career information
- High school: Archbishop Stepinac (White Plains, New York)
- College: George Washington (2008–2012)
- NBA draft: 2012: undrafted
- Playing career: 2012–present

Career history
- 2012–2013: Tulsa 66ers
- 2013–2015: Turów Zgorzelec
- 2015–2017: Enisey
- 2016: SIG Strasbourg
- 2017–2018: Banvit
- 2018–2019: Virtus Bologna
- 2019–2022: Pınar Karşıyaka
- 2022–2023: Türk Telekom
- 2023–2024: Bahçeşehir Koleji
- 2024–2025: UNICS Kazan
- 2025–2026: Trabzonspor
- 2026–present: Türk Telekom

Career highlights
- FIBA Champions League champion (2019); Polish League champion (2014); Polish Supercup champion (2014)
- Stats at Basketball Reference

Tony Christopher Taylor (born August 9, 1990) is an American professional basketball player for Türk Telekom of the Turkish Basketbol Süper Ligi (BSL) and the EuroCup.

== College career ==
Taylor played 4 seasons of college basketball at the George Washington University, with the George Washington Colonials.

== Professional Career ==
He went undrafted in the 2012 NBA draft. On November 2, 2012, he was selected by the Tulsa 66ers in the 2012 NBA D-League draft.

In the summer of 2013, Taylor signed with Turów Zgorzelec of Poland. With Turow, he won the Polish Championship in the 2013–14 season.

In August 2015, Taylor signed with the Russian club Enisey of the VTB United League. With Enisey, he played in the 2016 FIBA Europe Cup Final Four, where the team finished fourth. After the VTB United League season ended, Taylor signed with Strasbourg IG of France for the rest of the season. On September 11, 2016, he returned to Enisey for the 2016–17 season.

On July 4, 2017, Taylor signed with Turkish club Banvit for the 2017–18 season.

On July 18, 2018, Taylor signed a deal with Italian club Virtus Bologna for the 2018–19 LBA season and Champions League.

On July 26, 2019, he has signed a contract with Pınar Karşıyaka of the Turkish Basketbol Süper Ligi.

On July 5, 2022, he has signed with Türk Telekom of the Turkish Basketbol Süper Ligi (BSL).

On July 6, 2023, he signed with Bahçeşehir Koleji of the Basketbol Süper Ligi (BSL).

On August 12, 2024, he signed with UNICS Kazan of the VTB United League. On October 17, 2024, Taylor was awarded the Hoops Agents Player of the Week award for Round 7 as he had 19 points and 13 assists.

On July 8, 2025, he signed with Trabzonspor of the Basketbol Süper Ligi (BSL).

On July 2, 2026, he signed with Türk Telekom of the Turkish Basketbol Süper Ligi (BSL) and returned for a second stint.

== Honours ==
=== Club ===
Turów Zgorzelec

- Polish Basketball League: 2014–15
- Polish Supercup: 2015

Virtus Bologna

- Basketball Champions League: 2018–19
