= Maalik Wayns =

American-Belarusian basketball player (born 1991)

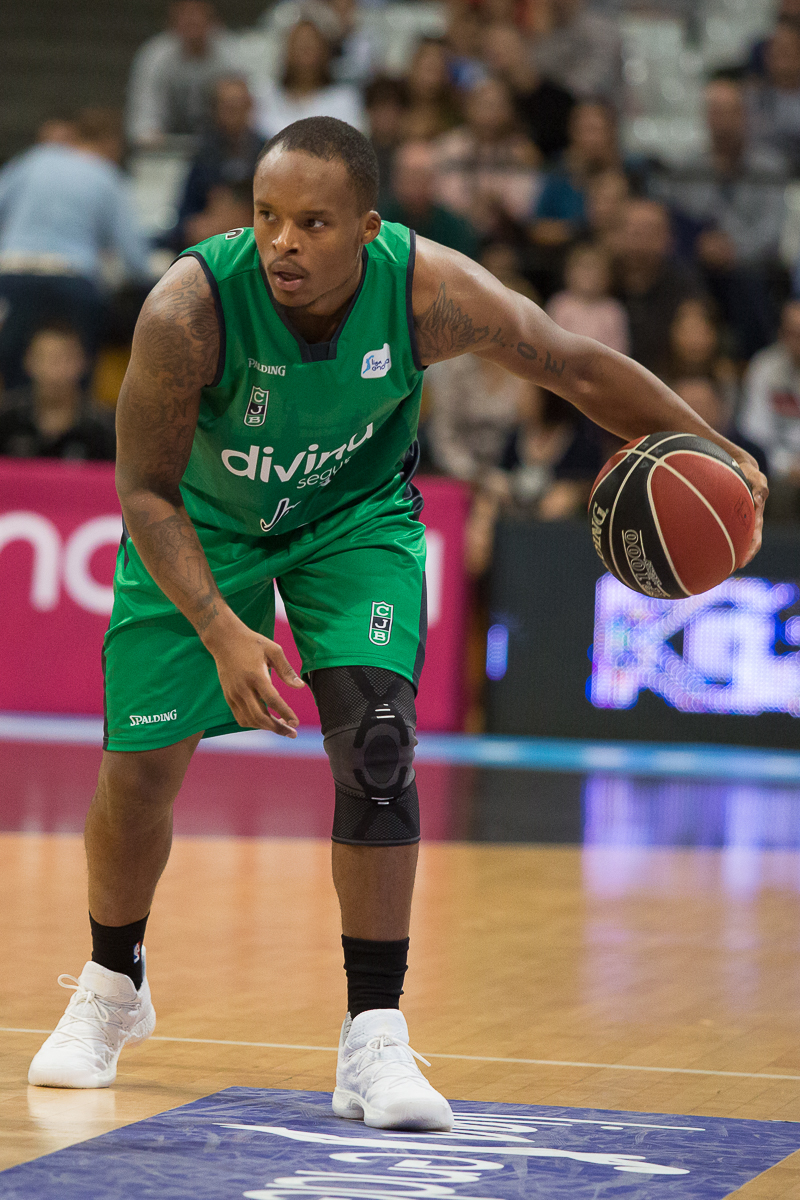
- Wayns with Joventut Badalona in 2017

Personal information
- Born: May 2, 1991 (age 35) Philadelphia, Pennsylvania, U.S.
- Listed height: 6 ft 1 in (1.85 m)
- Listed weight: 195 lb (88 kg)

Career information
- High school: Roman Catholic (Philadelphia, Pennsylvania)
- College: Villanova (2009–2012)
- NBA draft: 2012: undrafted
- Playing career: 2012–2021
- Position: Point guard
- Number: 18, 2, 5
- Coaching career: 2022–present

Career history

Playing
- 2012–2013: Philadelphia 76ers
- 2013: Rio Grande Valley Vipers
- 2013–2014: Los Angeles Clippers
- 2014: Rio Grande Valley Vipers
- 2015: Delaware 87ers
- 2015: Atenienses de Manatí
- 2015–2016: Varese
- 2016: Enisey
- 2016–2017: Maccabi Rishon LeZion
- 2017–2018: Joventut Badalona
- 2018–2019: Universo Treviso Basket
- 2019: Levallois Metropolitans
- 2019–2020: Tsmoki-Minsk
- 2020–2021: Mahram Tehran BC

Coaching
- 2022–2025: Camden HS
- 2025-present: Skyline Prep HS

Career highlights
- Second-team All-Big East (2012); Big East All-Rookie Team (2010); Third-team Parade All-American (2009); McDonald's All-American (2009)
- Stats at NBA.com
- Stats at Basketball Reference
Medals
Men's basketball
Representing United States
FIBA Americas U-18 Championship
Silver medal – second place	2008 Argentina	Team

Maalik Benjamin Wayns (born May 2, 1991) is an American-Belarusian basketball coach and former professional player. He played high school basketball for Roman Catholic High School in Philadelphia, where he was a Parade All-American as well as a McDonald's All-American before playing college basketball for Villanova University under coach Jay Wright. He is the current Program Director and head coach of boys' basketball at Skyline Prep High School in Phoenix, Arizona. Wayns was the head coach of the boys' basketball team at Camden High School in Camden, New Jersey from 2022 to 2025.

== Early life ==
Wayns was born on May 2, 1991, in Philadelphia, Pennsylvania to Verland and Deborah Wayns. Maalik has one sibling named V. J. Wayns.

== High school career ==
Wayns was a member of Roman Catholic High School's varsity basketball team. As a Junior, he averaged 22.4 points, 5.1 assists, 4.8 rebounds, and 2.1 steals. Wayns was also a two-time MVP in the Philadelphia Catholic League and also first team all-city and all-state in Pennsylvania. As a Senior, Wayns averaged 19.2 points, 5.1 rebounds and 5.5 assists. He was named a third-team Parade All-American and McDonald's All-American at the end of the year.

== College career ==
=== Freshman ===
Wayns chose to attend Villanova University to play under coach Jay Wright. On November 16, 2009, Wayns scored 16 points in 18 minutes to help Villanova defeat the University of Pennsylvania. He was named Big East All-Rookie Team and won the Big East Rookie of the Week three times. Wayns finished with 6.8 points and 1.3 assists.

=== Sophomore ===
Wayns scored 15 points and 6 assists against Bucknell University on November 12, 2010. He had a career night against the Marist Red Foxes on November 16, 2010, as he scored 17 points to go with 4 assists and 7 rebounds and 1 steal as 'Nova won 84–47. He recorded his first double-double against Boston University on November 17, 2010, scoring 12 points and dishing 12 assists. He had a career-high 19 points against UCLA on November 24, 2010, along with 6 rebounds as Villanova won 82–70.

=== Junior ===
As a junior in 2011–12, Wayns earned second-team All-Big East honors after averaging 17.6 points per game.

== Professional career ==
=== 2012–13 season ===
After going undrafted in the 2012 NBA draft, Wayns joined the Orlando Magic for the Orlando Summer League and the Golden State Warriors for the Las Vegas Summer League. On July 31, 2012, he signed with the Philadelphia 76ers. On January 6, 2013, he was waived by the 76ers but was re-signed to a 10-day contract two days later. He was not re-signed when that contract expired. On January 21, 2013, he was acquired by the Rio Grande Valley Vipers of the NBA Development League.

On March 9, 2013, Wayns signed a 10-day contract with the Los Angeles Clippers. On March 19, he signed a second 10-day contract with the Clippers, and on March 29, he signed with the Clippers for the remainder of the season.

=== 2013–14 season ===
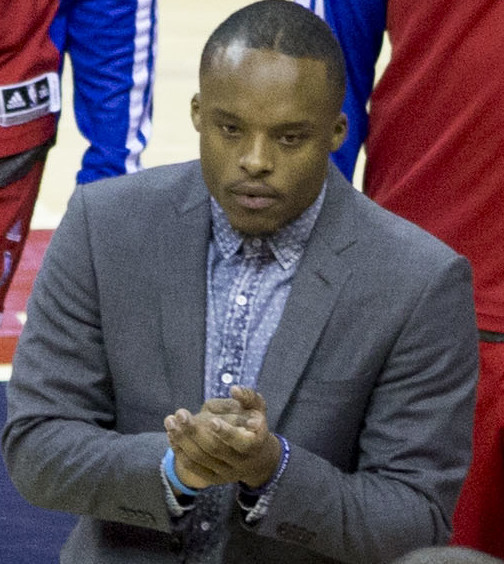
Wayns dons a suit while on the sidelines with the Los Angeles Clippers in 2013

In July 2013, Wayns joined the Clippers for the 2013 NBA Summer League and later joined the team for training camp, where he made the final roster on a non-guaranteed contract for the 2013–14 season. On January 5, 2014, he was waived by the Clippers, and three days later, he signed another 10-day contract with the Clippers. On January 16, he was waived by the Clippers. On February 17, 2014, he was reacquired by the Rio Grande Valley Vipers.

=== 2014–15 season ===
After playing three games for the Washington Wizards during the 2014 NBA Summer League, Wayns signed a one-year deal with Žalgiris Kaunas of the Lithuanian Basketball League on July 30, 2014. On October 13, 2014, he parted ways with Žalgiris due to injury before appearing in a game for them.

On January 12, 2015, Wayns' returning player rights were traded by Rio Grande Valley to the Delaware 87ers in exchange for the returning player rights to Hamady N'Diaye. On February 3, 2015, he officially joined the 87ers. On April 6, 2015, after the end of the 2014–15 D-League season, Wayns signed with Atenienses de Manatí of Puerto Rico for the rest of the 2015 BSN season.

=== 2015–16 season ===
On August 14, 2015, Wayns signed with Pallacanestro Varese of the Italian Serie A for the 2015–16 season.

=== 2016–17 season ===
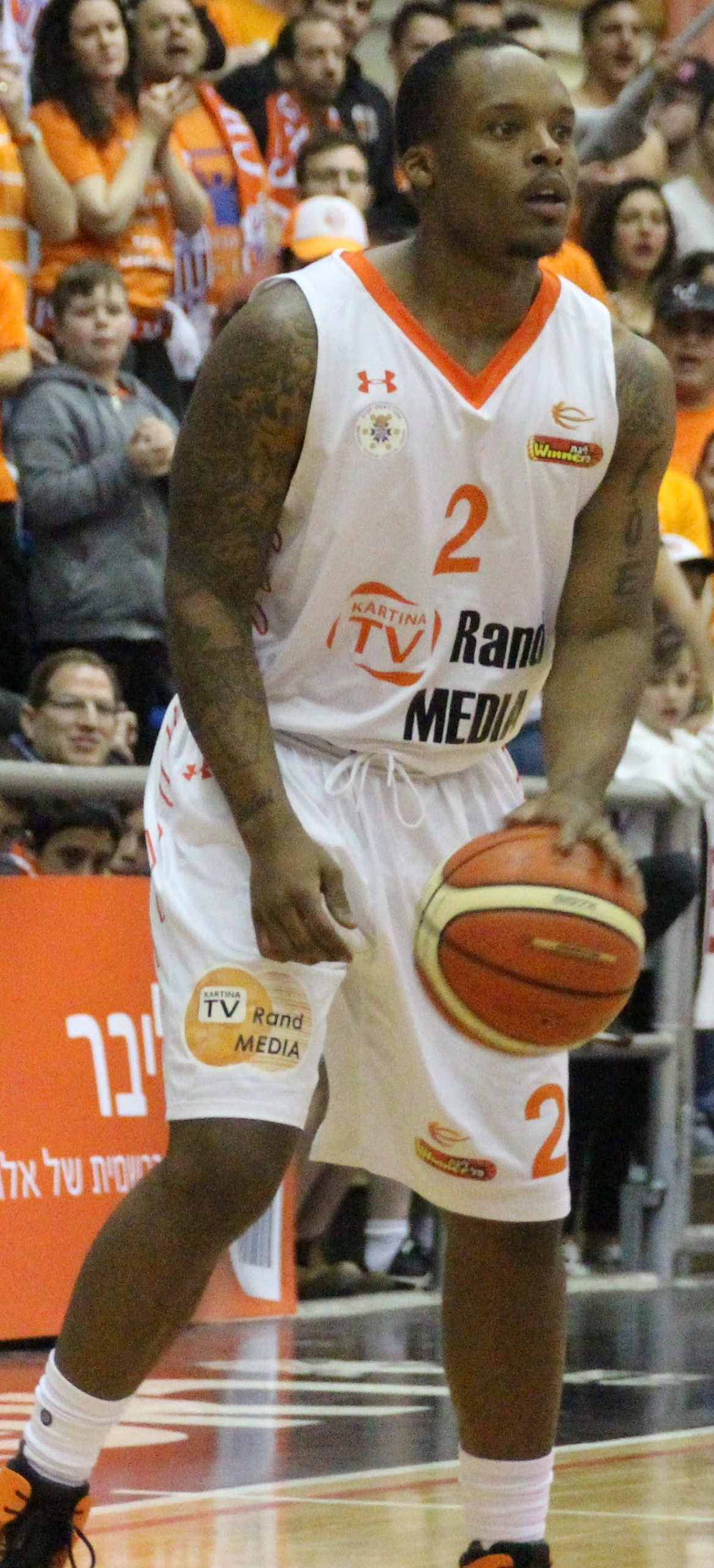
Wayns with Maccabi Rishon LeZion in 2017

On August 1, 2016, Wayns signed with Enisey Krasnoyarsk of Russia for the 2016–17 season.

On November 24, 2016, Wayns signed with the Israeli team Maccabi Rishon LeZion.

=== 2017–18 season ===
On August 28, 2017, Wayns signed with the Dallas Mavericks. On October 14, 2017, he was waived by the Mavericks. On October 25, 2017, he signed with Spanish club Joventut Badalona for the rest of the 2017–18 ACB season.

=== 2019–20 season ===
On August 27, 2019, he has signed with Tsmoki-Minsk of VTB United League. On February 2, 2020, Wayns signed with Mahram Tehran BC of the Iranian Basketball Super League.

== National team career ==
Wayns became a naturalized citizen of Belarus in 2016.

== The Basketball Tournament (TBT) ==
In the summer of 2017, Wayns competed in The Basketball Tournament on ESPN for Team FOE, a Philadelphia based team coached by NBA forwards Markieff and Marcus Morris. In two games, Wayns averaged 10.0 points, 2.5 rebounds and 1.5 assists as Team FOE advanced to the Super 16 Round in Brooklyn, New York. FOE ended up losing 72–67 in the Super 16 against Boeheim's Army, a team composed of Syracuse University basketball alum. Wayns also competed for FOE in 2016 as well. In three games that summer, he averaged 18.0 points, 4.7 rebounds and 3.3 assists per game.

== Coaching career ==
As of the 2021–22 season, Wayns serves on the Student Athlete Development staff for the Villanova Men's Basketball team. In his role, Wayns focuses on off-court development of student-athletes.

On November 17, 2022, Wayns was hired as the new head coach of Camden High School's boys basketball team, succeeding Rick Brunson, who departed to join the New York Knicks coaching staff.

On May 13, 2025, Wayns announced on social media he was leaving Camden High School, for new head coaching opportunity. On May 22, 2025, Maalik Wayns was announced as the next Program Director and Head Coach of the national basketball team at Skyline Prep High School in Arizona.

== Career statistics ==
Legend
GP	Games played	GS	Games started	MPG	Minutes per game
FG%	Field goal percentage	3P%	3-point field goal percentage	FT%	Free throw percentage
RPG	Rebounds per game	APG	Assists per game	SPG	Steals per game
BPG	Blocks per game	PPG	Points per game	**Bold**	Career high

=== NBA ===
==== Regular season ====
Year	Team	GP	GS	MPG	FG%	3P%	FT%	RPG	APG	SPG	BPG	PPG
2012–13	Philadelphia	**21**	**1**	**7.9**	.264	.200	.867	.2	1.0	.1	.0	2.7
2012–13	L.A. Clippers	6	0	6.2	.438	**.333**	**1.000**	.3	**1.2**	.5	.0	**3.3**
2013–14	L.A. Clippers	2	0	4.5	**.500**	–	–	**1.0**	1.0	**1.0**	.0	1.0
Career		29	1	7.3	.300	.226	.895	.3	1.0	.3	.0	2.7
