= William Gradit =

French basketball player

Saint-Vallier Basket Drôme
- Position: Shooting guard

Personal information
- Born: May 29, 1982 (age 44) Strasbourg, France
- Listed height: 6 ft 5.55 in (1.97 m)
- Listed weight: 211 lb (96 kg)

Career information
- High school: Laurinburg Institute (Laurinburg, North Carolina)
- College: Hill College (2001–2002)
- Playing career: 2002–present

Career history
- 2002–2004: Paris Racing
- 2004–2005: Rueil Pro
- 2004–2005: FC Mulhouse
- 2005–2006: Besançon BCD
- 2006–2009: JA Vichy
- 2009–2010: Stade Clermontois
- 2010: Boulazac Dordogne
- 2011–2012: Cholet
- 2012–2014: Chorale Roanne
- 2014–2016: Élan Chalon
- 2016–2017: Paris-Levallois
- 2017–present: SVBD

Career highlights
- Pro B champion (2007)

William Gradit (born May 29, 1982) is a French professional basketball player who currently plays for SVBD of the Nationale Masculine 1.

== Early career ==
Gradit had his basketball debuts with the youth centre of ALM Évreux Basket (Pro B) between 1997 and 1999 before going to United States and attending the Laurinburg Institute and then going to the Hill College between 2000 and 2002.

== Professional career ==
Gradit joined Paris Racing of the French Pro A as a junior player of the team roster between 2002 and 2004. He then joined different Pro B teams, Rueil PB, FC Mulhouse Basket and Besançon BCD, before joining Vichy in 2006. With Vichy, Gradit won the Pro B championship in 2007 and consequently after the club's promotion he made his debut in Pro A. In 2009, he left Vichy for Stade Clermontois of the Pro B. In 2010, he joined Boulazac of the Pro B. In January 2011, he signs for Cholet Basket of the Pro A as a replacement for Fabien Causeur, who was injured.
