= Konstantin Klein =

German basketball player (born 1991)

Konstantin Konga
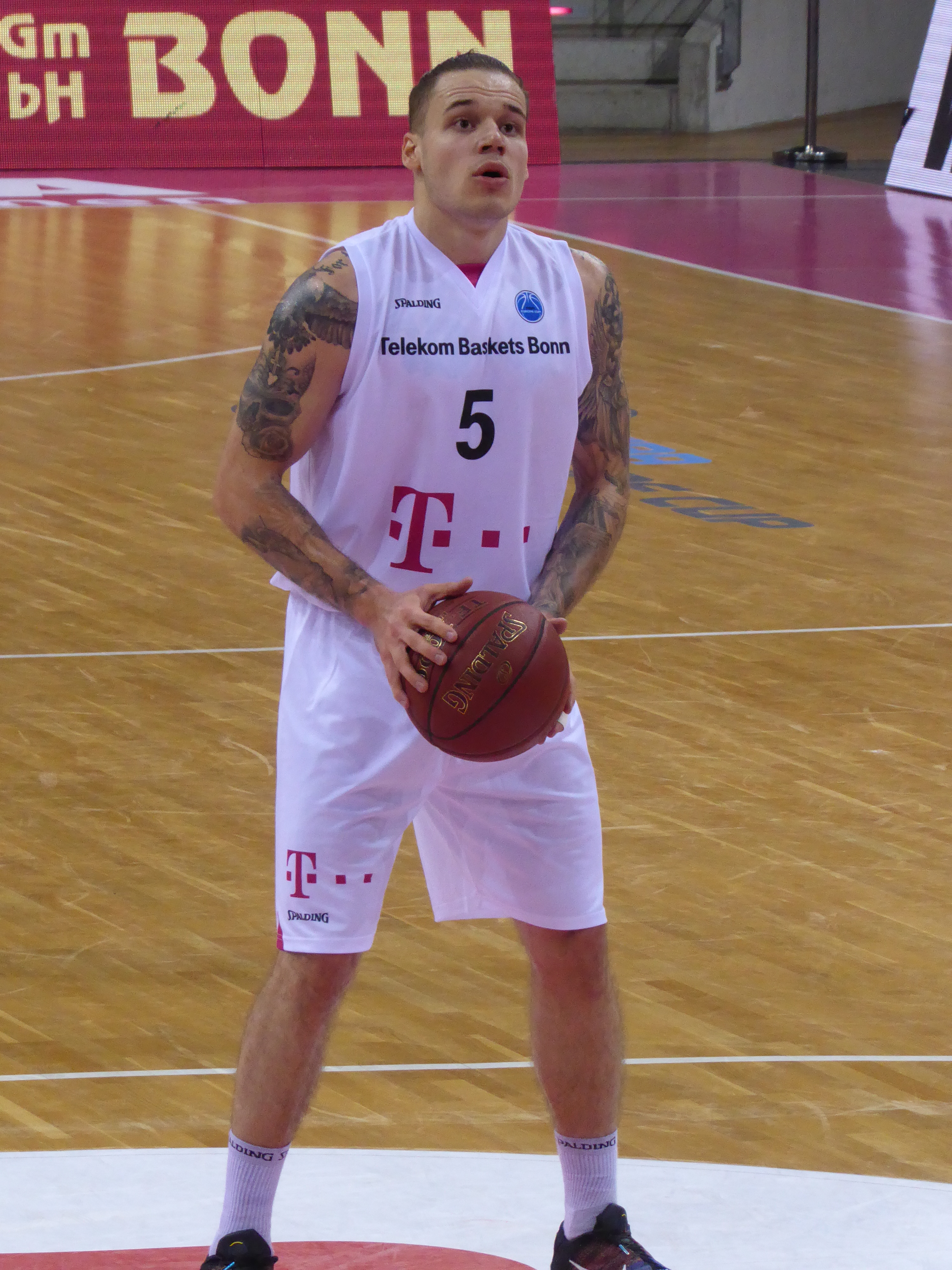
- Konga with Bonn in 2016

No. 7 – retired
- Position: Point guard

Personal information
- Born: 21 May 1991 (age 35) Berlin, Germany
- Listed height: 6 ft 1.5 in (1.87 m)
- Listed weight: 189 lb (86 kg)

Career information
- NBA draft: 2013: undrafted
- Playing career: 2007–2022

Career history
- 2010–2011: Alba Berlin II
- 2011–2012: Rockets Gotha
- 2012–2016: Skyliners Frankfurt
- 2016–2018: Telekom Baskets Bonn
- 2018–2020: Riesen Ludwigsburg
- 2020–2021: Skyliners Frankfurt
- 2021–2022: Eisbären Bremerhaven

Career highlights
- FIBA Europe Cup champion (2016); BBL All-Star (2016)
Medals
Men's basketball
Representing Germany
Universiade
Silver medal – second place	2015 Gwangju	Team

Konstantin Kasimir Sidney Klein (born 21 May 1991; formerly known as Konstantin Konga) is a German former professional basketball player who lastly played for Eisbären Bremerhaven of the German ProA. Standing at 1.87 m (6 ft 2 in) he plays at the point guard position.

After his divorce in January 2023, he changed his surname back from Konga to Klein.

== Professional career ==
In May 2012, he signed with Fraport Skyliners.

On 10 August 2016, Konga signed a three-year deal with Telekom Baskets Bonn. On 28 July 2020, Konga returned to Skyliners Frankfurt.

On July 22, 2021, he has signed with Eisbären Bremerhaven of the German ProA.

== National team ==
In 2015, Klein was selected for the German national basketball team. He didn't make the cut for the EuroBasket 2015 selection.
