= Giancarlo Ferrero =

Italian basketball player

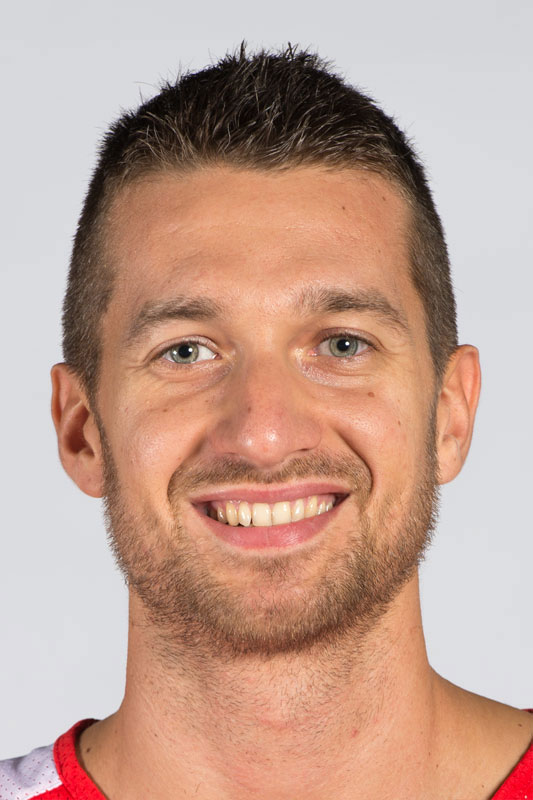

Free agent
- Position: Small forward

Personal information
- Born: 29 August 1988 (age 38) Bra, Italy
- Listed height: 1.98 m (6 ft 6 in)
- Listed weight: 97 kg (214 lb)

Career information
- Playing career: 2003–present

Career history
- 2003–2013: Junior Casale
- 2006–2007: →Valenza
- 2007–2008: →Virtus Siena
- 2008–2009: →Robur Osimo
- 2012: →Fortitudo Bologna
- 2013–2015: Pallacanestro Trapani
- 2015–2023: Pallacanestro Varese
- 2023–2024: Pallacanestro Trieste
- 2024–2026: Pallacanestro Brescia

Giancarlo Ferrero (born 29 August 1988) is an Italian professional basketball player who last played for Pallacanestro Brescia of the Lega Basket Serie A (LBA). He is a 6 ft 6 in (1.98 m) small forward.

== Professional career ==
=== Clubs ===
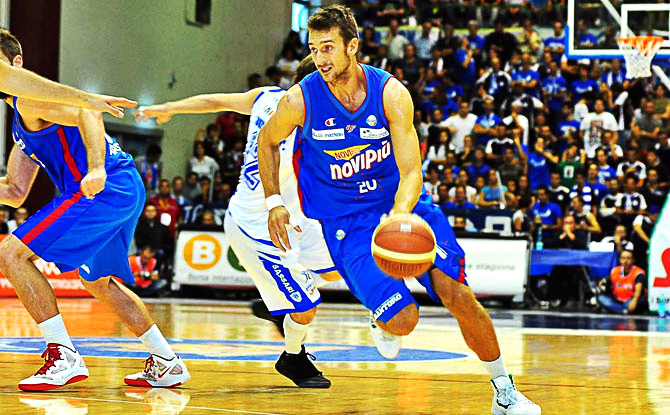
Giancarlo Ferrero on 9 October 2011 in Sassari, with Junior Casale in Serie A

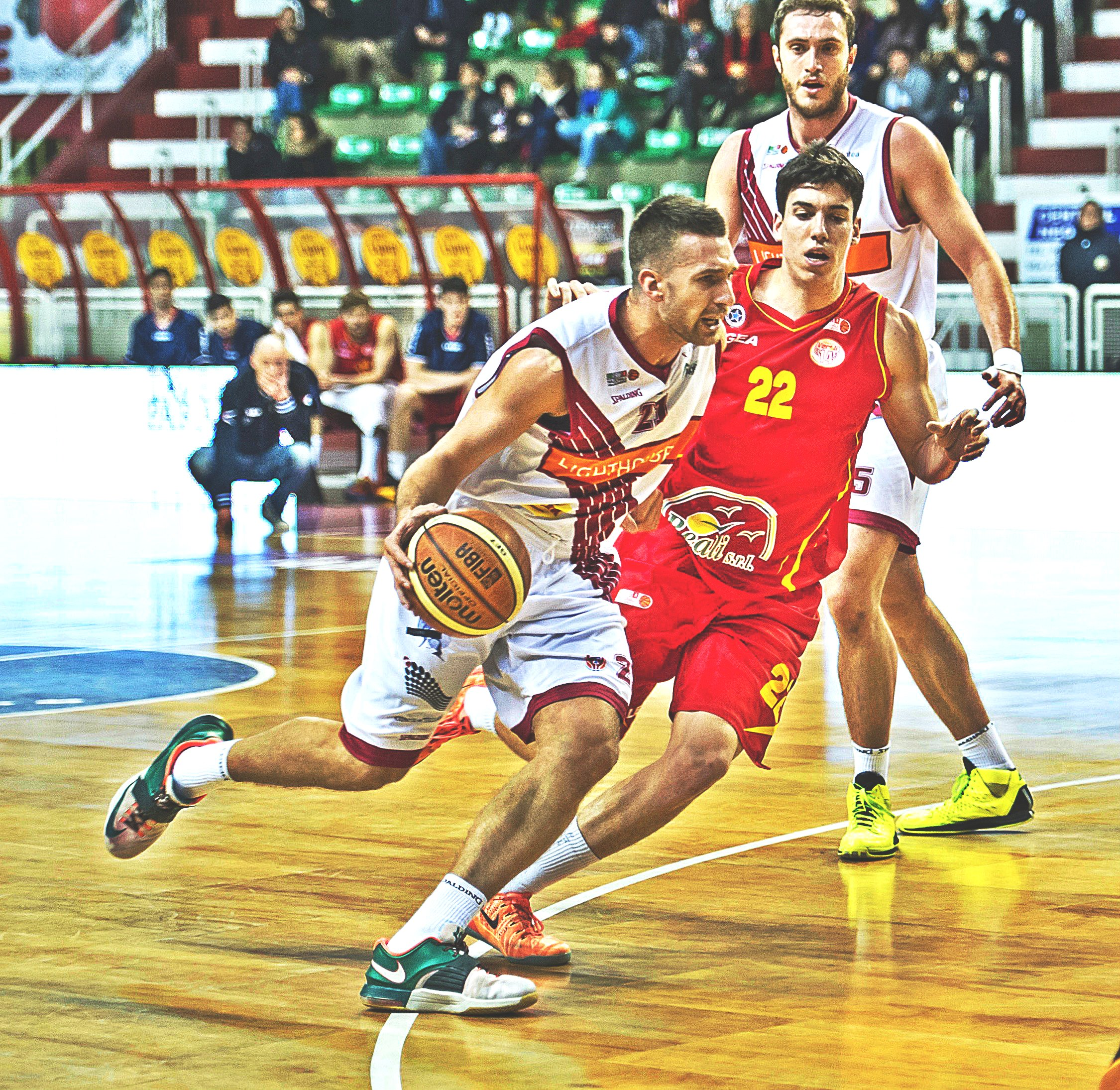
Giancarlo Ferrero with Trapani during the 2014-2015 Serie A2 season

Giancarlo Ferrero made his debut in 2003 with A.S. Junior Pallacanestro Casale in Casale Monferrato. At the end of the Serie B regular season, he achieved the promotion to Serie A2 Basket and won the Serie B Cup.

Between 2006 and 2009 he was sent on loan to Valenza, Virtus Siena and Robur Osimo. But in 2009 he returned to Casale.

During the 2010–11 Serie A2 season, Junior Casale won the regular season and went to the playoffs when they achieved the historical promotion to Lega Basket Serie A, the highest-tier level professional league in Italy.

On 9 October 2011, in Sassari, it was the first time for Ferrero in Serie A where he got 8 points. In March 2012 he was sent on loan again to Conad Bologna (Serie A2).

In 2012-13 Serie A season, he returned to Casale (Serie A2), where he reached the 3rd place in regular season and the playoffs' semi-finals.

In 2013 he went to Pallacanestro Trapani, again in Serie A2. He became the team captain of Trapani also in 2014–15 Serie A2 season.

In July 2015 signed a two-year-contract with Pallacanestro Varese (LBA). At the end of the 2015–16 LBA season they reached the 9th place of the regular season, and the 2016 Final Four of the 2015–16 FIBA Europe Cup where they lost in the Finals 62–66 with the German Skyliners Frankfurt.

On July 25, 2024, he signed with Pallacanestro Brescia of the Lega Basket Serie A (LBA).

=== Italy national basketball team ===
Giancarlo Ferrere made his debut in the Italy national basketball team in 2009, when he played 4 matches with 28 points. He went to the European Under-18 and Under-20 Championships in 2006 and 2008. In the youth national teams he played 37 matches with 228 points. In 2012 he was summoned to the Senior national team for the friendly matches against Greece and France in Folgaria and Rome.
