= Johannes Richter =

German basketball player (born 1993)

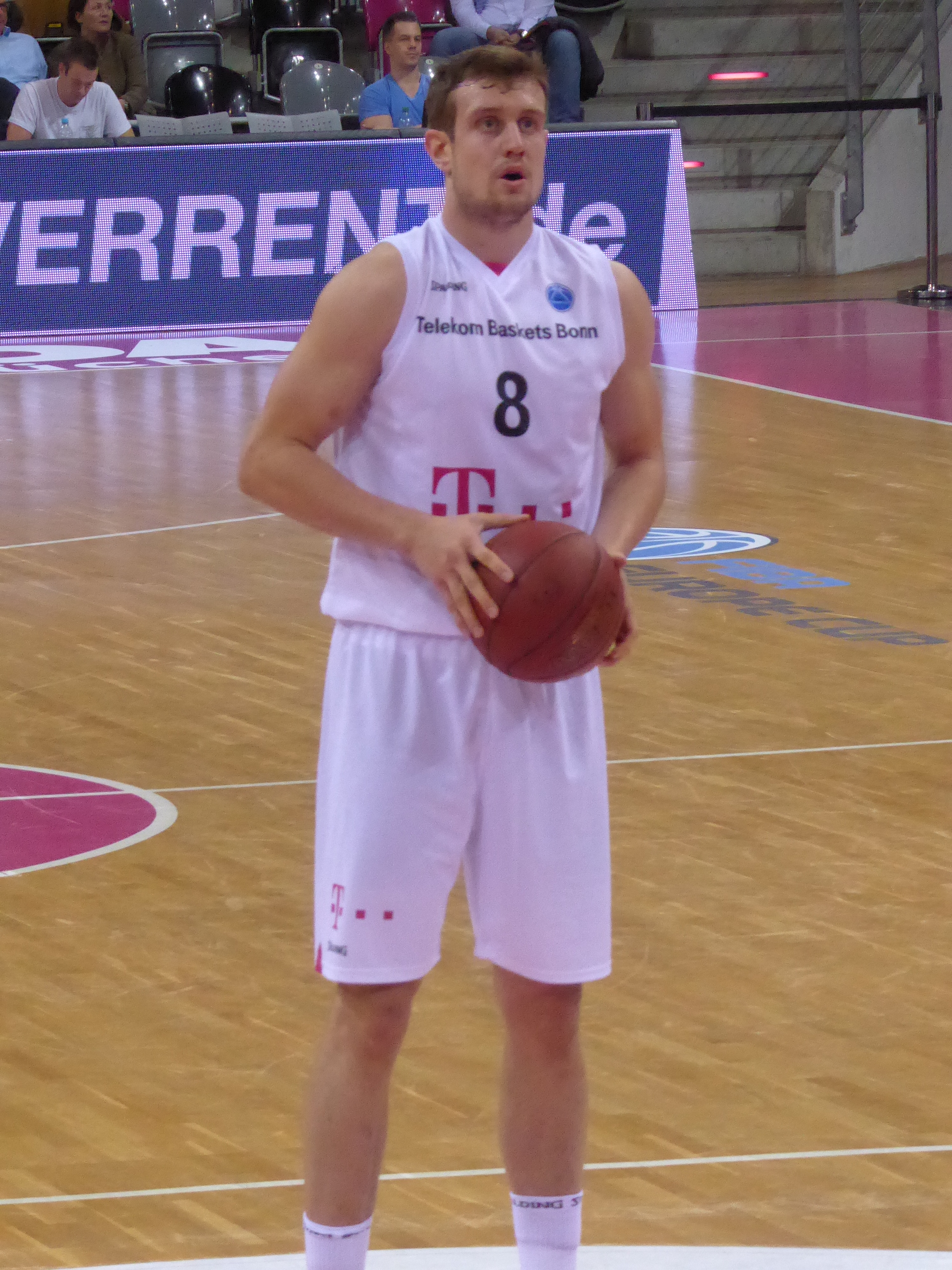
- Richter with Bonn in 2016

Free Agent
- Position: Power forward

Personal information
- Born: 6 December 1993 (age 32) Neustadt a.d.Aisch, Germany
- Listed height: 206 cm (6 ft 9 in)

Career information
- Playing career: 2009–2022

Career history
- 2009–2010: Franken Hexer
- 2010–2013: TSV Tröster Breitengüßbach
- 2011–2013: Brose Baskets
- 2013: Baunach
- 2013–2016: Skyliners Frankfurt
- 2016–2017: Telekom Bonn
- 2017–2018: Rockets Gotha
- 2018–2020: s.Oliver Würzburg
- 2020–2021: Gießen 46ers
- 2021: Hamburg Towers
- 2021–2022: Mitteldeutscher BC

Career highlights
- FIBA Europe Cup champion (2016)

Johannes Richter (born 6 December 1993) is a former German professional basketball player who last played for Mitteldeutscher BC of the Basketball Bundesliga.

== Professional career ==
On 6 June 2016, Richter signed a two-year deal with Telekom Baskets Bonn.

Richter signed with BBL newcomers Oettinger Rockets for the 2017–18 season.

On 14 August 2020, he signed with Gießen 46ers of the Basketball Bundesliga.

On 8 January 2021, he signed with Hamburg Towers of the Basketball Bundesliga.

On 11 June 2021, he signed with Mitteldeutscher BC of the Basketball Bundesliga.
