= Ovidijus Varanauskas =

Lithuanian basketball player (born 1991)

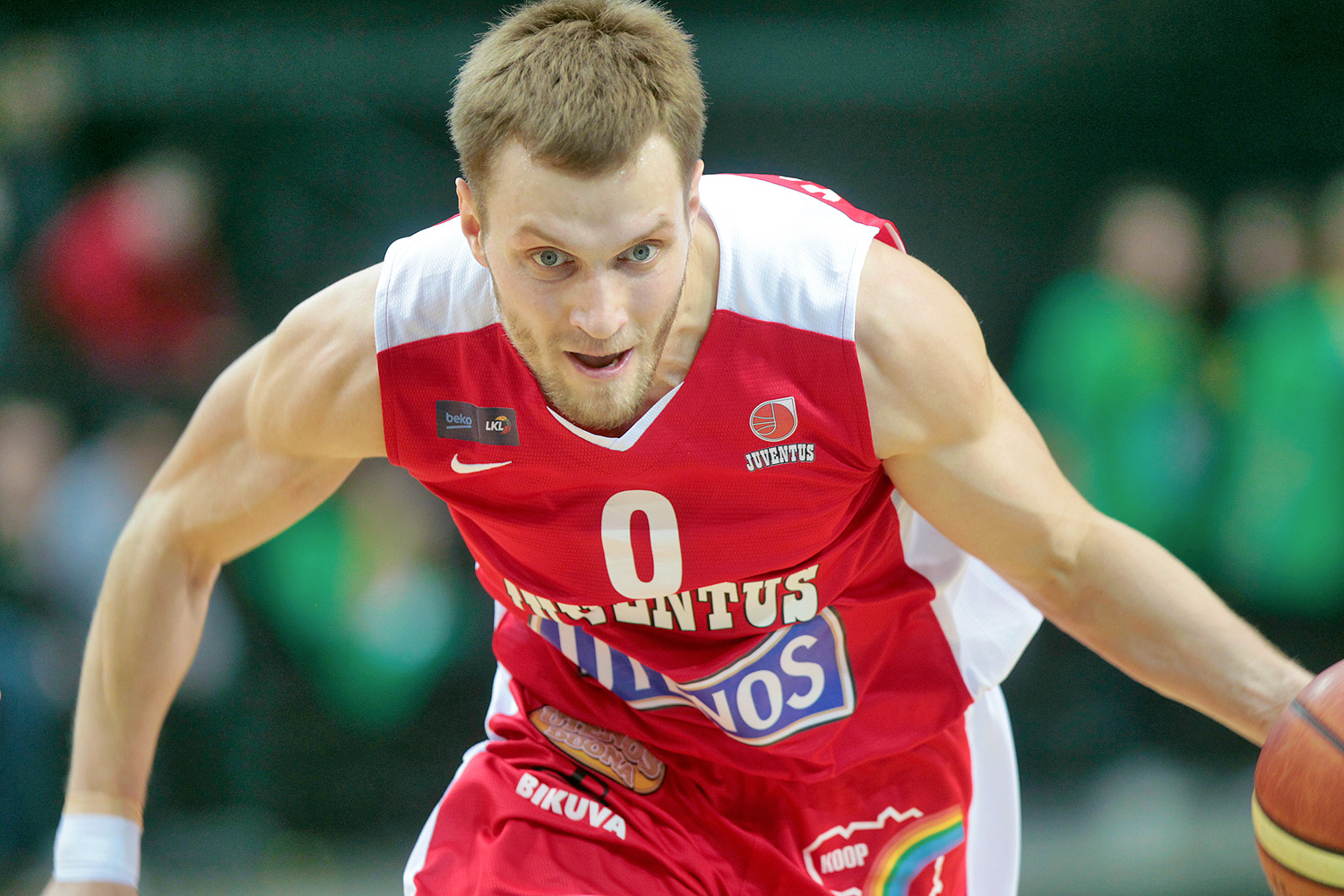
- Varanauskas with Juventus Utena in 2015

Personal information
- Born: February 23, 1991 (age 35) Vilnius, Lithuania
- Listed height: 187 cm (6.14 ft)
- Listed weight: 75 kg (165 lb)

Career information
- NBA draft: 2013: undrafted
- Playing career: 2008–2024
- Position: Point guard

Career history
- 2008–2009: KM-Magnus-Orem Vilnius
- 2010–2011: Sakalai Vilnius
- 2011–2013: Statyba Vilnius
- 2013–2014: Polpharma Starogard Gdański
- 2014–2015: Prienai
- 2015: Juventus Utena
- 2015–2016: Varese
- 2016: BK Valmiera
- 2016–2017: Gries-Oberhoffen Basket Club
- 2017–2018: Rouen Métropole Basket
- 2018–2019: Skycop Prienai
- 2019: Trefl Sopot
- 2019-2020: Limoges CSP
- 2019-2020: Yeni Mamak Spor
- 2020-2021: UJAP Quimper
- 2022: Saint-Vallier BD
- 2022-2023: Omega-Tauras-LSU
- 2023-2024: Milasta Birštonas
Medals
Men's basketball
Representing Lithuania
FIBA Europe Under-16 Championship
Bronze medal – third place	2007 Greece	Team
Men's 3x3 basketball
Representing Lithuania
FIBA Europe 3x3 Championships
Bronze medal – third place	2014 Bucharest	Team

Ovidijus Varanauskas (born February 23, 1991) is a former professional Lithuanian basketball player. He plays the point guard position.

== International career ==
Varanauskas previously represented the Lithuanian youth squads and won bronze medal with the Lithuanian U-16 Team in 2007 FIBA Europe Under-16 Championship.

== 3x3 ==
Varanauskas made his 3x3 debut in 2013 at the FIBA 3x3 World Tour Prague Masters, representing the city of Vilnius and finishing 6th.

One year later, Varanauskas was called up to represent Lithuania at the FIBA 3x3 World Championships in Moscow, Russia, and led the team to the semi-finals. He collected bronze three months later at the FIBA 3x3 European Championships in Bucharest, Romania.

In 2015, Varanauskas made another national team appearance at the first-ever European Games in Baku, Azerbaijan, and reached 6th place. In the 3x3 professional circuit, he had a masterful performance at the Lausanne Masters, leading Team Vilnius to the win and getting MVP honours. His squad finished 11th at the FIBA 3x3 World Tour Final in Abu Dhabi, UAE.
