= BC Enisey =

Professional basketball team in Krasnoyarsk, Russia

- League: VTB United League
- Founded: 1981
- History: Polytechnic (1981–1989); Krastyazhmash (1989–1991); Eskavo (1991–1993); BC Yenisey (1993–present)
- Arena: Arena Sever
- Capacity: 3,128
- Location: Krasnoyarsk, Russia
- Team colors: Blue, white
- Head coach: Jovica Arsić
- Championships: 1 Russian Super League 2
- Website: basket-enisey.ru
Home	Away

BC Yenisey (Russian: БК Енисей) is a Russian professional basketball team from the city of Krasnoyarsk, Siberia. Since the 2011–12 season, Enisey plays in the VTB United League. The team colors are blue and white. Its full name is Basketball Club Enisey Krasnoyarsk Krai.

== History ==
Yenisey Krasnoyarsk was founded as Polytechnic, and played its games at the Krasnoyarsk State Technical University. The team started off in the lower leagues of the Soviet Union, and its best achievement was winning the USSR Cup for teams in Siberia in 1988. In the 1997–98 season, the team played at the highest Russian level for the first time, when it played in the Russian Super League 1. However, the club was relegated immediately, and the next comeback of the club to Russian the highest level was in 2007, when the team was promoted again.

In the 2009–10 season, Enisey made its first appearance in a European-wide competition, when it competed in the FIBA EuroChallenge. In the 2015–16 season, Yenisey had a chance to win a European trophy, after it had reached the 2016 FIBA Europe Cup Final Four. After two losses, Enisey finished in fourth place.

== Arena ==
Enisey plays its home games in the Arena Sever, which has a capacity of 4,100 people.

== Trophies ==
- Russian Super League 2
  - Champions (1): 2007
    - Runners-up (1): 2006

== Season by season ==
Season	Tier	League	Pos.	Russian Cup	European competitions	
2011-12	1	PBL	10th		3 FIBA EuroChallenge	3rd
2012–13	1	PBL	10th	Fourth place		
2013–14	1	United League	9th	Eighthfinals		
2014–15	1	United League	11th	First round	3 EuroChallenge	QF
2015–16	1	United League	10th	Second round	3 FIBA Europe Cup	4th
2016–17	1	United League	6th	Round of 64	4 FIBA Europe Cup	QF
2017–18	1	United League	13th		3 Champions League	RS
2018–19	1	United League	9th			
2019–20	1	United League	11th		4 FIBA Europe Cup	Top16
2020–21	1	United League	11th			
2021–22	1	United League	7th		4 FIBA Europe Cup	QR

== Players (2025) ==
Enisey roster
Players
Coaches

Pos.	No.	Nat.	Name	Ht.	Wt.	Age
PG	2	(United States)	Coleman III, Matt	1.88 m (6 ft 2 in)	82 kg (181 lb)	28 – 22 January 1998
G	4	(Russia)	Vedishchev, Mikhail	1.89 m (6 ft 2 in)	83 kg (183 lb)	21 – 17 July 2004
G	7	(United States)	Artis, Dominic	1.91 m (6 ft 3 in)	86 kg (190 lb)	32 – 7 July 1993
G	8	(Russia)	Evdokimov, Nikita	1.96 m (6 ft 5 in)	92 kg (203 lb)	23 – 14 January 2003
C	10	(Russia)	Ryzhov, Egor	2.11 m (6 ft 11 in)	86 kg (190 lb)	21 – 28 August 2004
F	12	(Russia)	Perevalov, Vladislav	1.90 m (6 ft 3 in)	96 kg (212 lb)	24 – 21 October 2001
G	13	(Russia)	Sonko, Dmitriy	1.97 m (6 ft 6 in)	86 kg (190 lb)	24 – 8 May 2001
F	14	(Russia)	Shlegel, Artyom	2.03 m (6 ft 8 in)	89 kg (196 lb)	22 – 19 August 2003
C	15	(Serbia)	Tasić, Danilo	2.06 m (6 ft 9 in)	107 kg (236 lb)	32 – 15 June 1993
C	21	(Russia)	Vanin, Egor	2.16 m (7 ft 1 in)	120 kg (265 lb)	22 – 29 February 2004
F	23	(Russia)	Dolinin, Sergey	2.05 m (6 ft 9 in)	97 kg (214 lb)	26 – 16 February 2000
F	25	(Russia)	Antipov, Artem	2.01 m (6 ft 7 in)	90 kg (198 lb)	21 – 18 September 2004

Head coach

- (Serbia) Jovica Arsić

Assistant coach(es)

- (Russia) Pavel Dergachev
- (Russia) Sergei Vasiliev

Athletic trainer(s)

- (Croatia) Josip Milisha

Physiotherapist(s)

- (Russia) Igor Chernenko
- (Russia) Vadim Topolya

Legend

- (C) Team captain
- Injured

- Roster
Updated: December 20, 2025

=== Notable players ===
Note: Flags indicate national team eligibility at FIBA-sanctioned events. Players may hold other non-FIBA nationalities not displayed.

Criteria

To appear in this section a player must have either:

- Set a club record or won an individual award while at the club
- Played at least one official international match for their national team at any time
- Played at least one official NBA match at any time.

- (Israel) Afik Nissim
- (Serbia) Kosta Perovic
- (United States) Corey Fisher
- (United States) Curtis Millage
- (United States) Terrico White
- (Latvia) Kaspars Kambala
- (Germany) Tim Ohlbrecht
- (United States Virgin Islands) Frank Elegar
- (Nigeria) Suleiman Braimoh
- (Canada) Xavier Rathan-Mayes
