= Stefan Ilzhöfer =

German basketball player (born 1995)

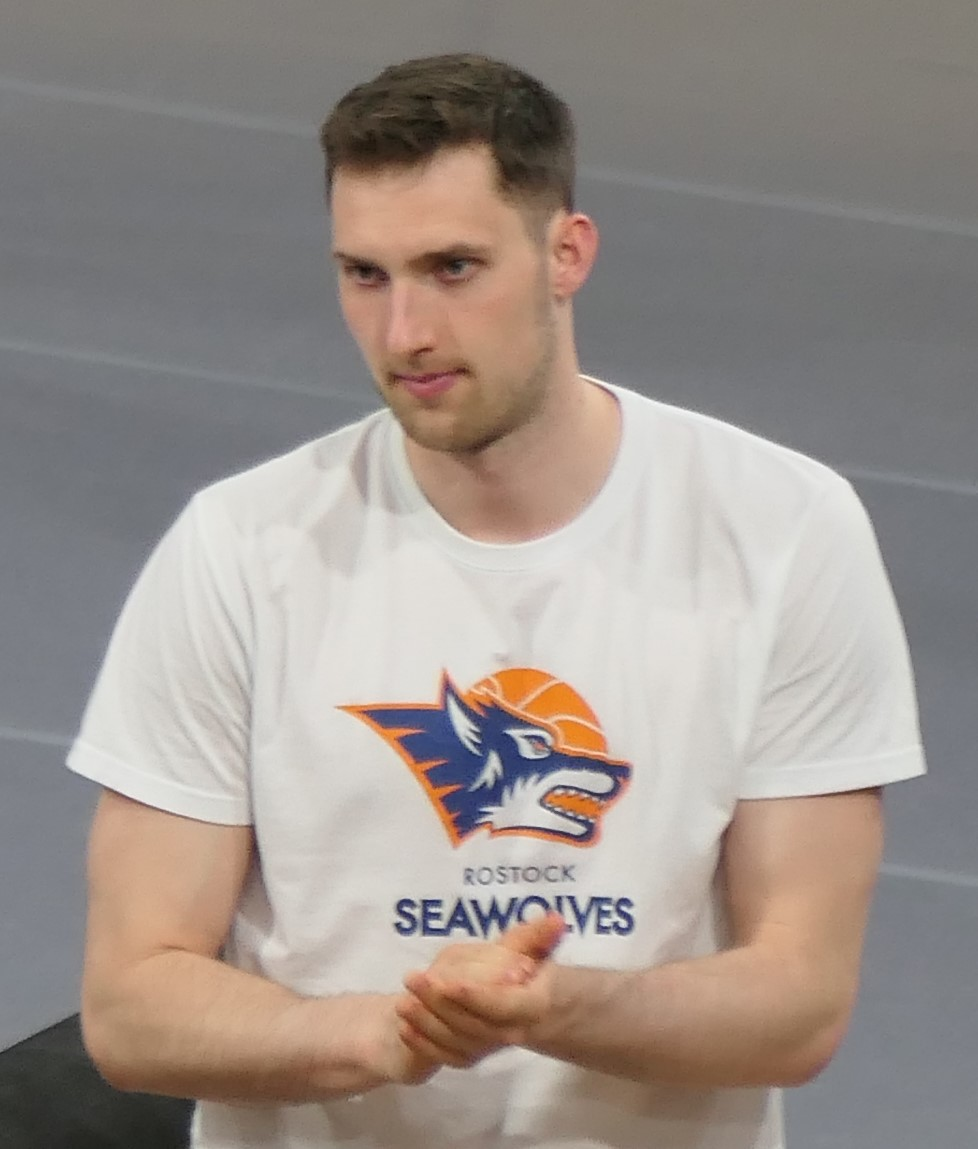
- Ilzhöfer in 2023

No. 12 – Rostock Seawolves
- Position: Small forward
- League: ProA

Personal information
- Born: 22 March 1995 (age 31) Kirchheim unter Teck, Germany
- Listed height: 6 ft 7 in (2.01 m)

Career information
- Playing career: 2011–present

Career history
- 2013–2017: Frankfurt Skyliners (Germany)
- 2020–present: Rostock Seawolves (Germany)

Stefan Ilzhöfer (born 22 March 1995) is a German professional basketball player who formerly played for the Frankfurt Skyliners of the European Basketball Champions League and the German League Basketball Bundesliga.

He currently plays for Rostock Seawolves. Before he joined the Seawolves, he played for Gladiators Trier.
