= Quantez Robertson =

American basketball shooting guard (born 1984)

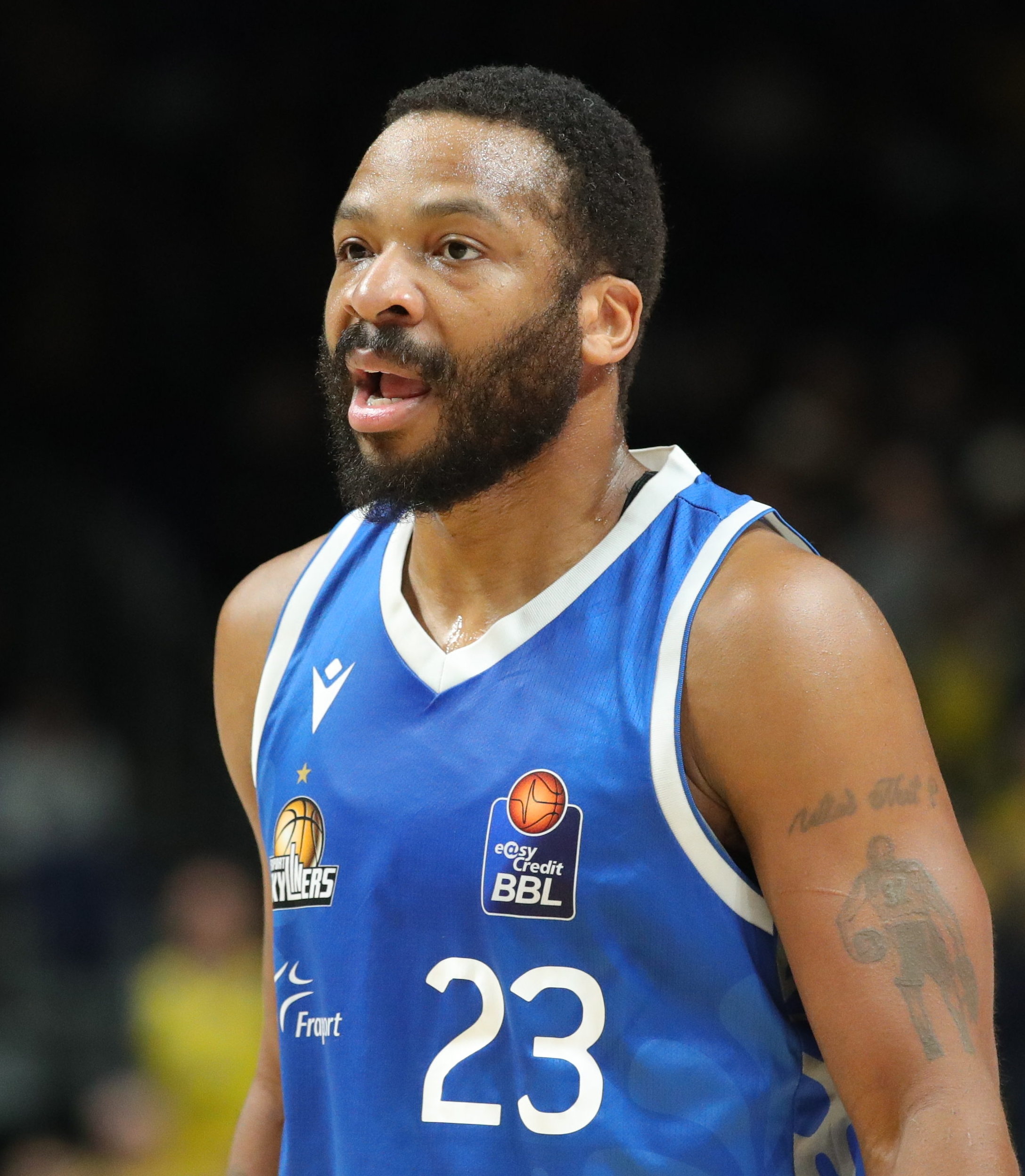
- Robertson with the Skyliners in 2023

Personal information
- Born: 16 December 1984 (age 41) Cincinnati, Ohio, U.S.
- Listed height: 6 ft 2 in (1.88 m)
- Listed weight: 205 lb (93 kg)

Career information
- High school: Laurinburg Institute (Laurinburg, North Carolina)
- College: Auburn (2005–2009)
- NBA draft: 2009: undrafted
- Playing career: 2009–2023
- Position: Shooting guard
- Number: 23

Career history
- 2009–2023: Fraport Skyliners

Career highlights
- FIBA Europe Cup Final Four MVP (2016); FIBA Europe Cup champion (2016); German Bundesliga Best Defender (2016); German BBL All-Star (2016)

Quantez Robertson (born 16 December 1984) is an American former basketball player. Robertson spent his entire professional career with German Bundesliga side Fraport Skyliners. He played college basketball for the Auburn Tigers from 2005 to 2009.

== College career ==
Robertson was named Outstanding Defensive Player of the Auburn Tigers three times. He is also the all-time leader in steals with 210 for the Tigers. In his junior year, he started all games for Auburn and averaged 7.8 points and 5.0 rebounds per game.

== Professional career ==
In 2009, Robertson signed a contract with the German BBL team Fraport Skyliners. In 2010, he reached the BBL Finals and the Cup Final with Skyliners; both were lost. The 2015–16 season was a successful one for Robertson and the Skyliners. The team won the FIBA Europe Cup Final against Pallacanestro Varese and Robertson was named Final Four MVP. In the Bundesliga, Robertson was named the BBL Best Defensive Player.

On May 1, 2023, Robertson announced his retirement, citing a persisting foot injury. He retired as the Bundesliga all-time leader in steals (742). His 1860 made three-pointers put him third on the all-time list. He had 4425 Bundesliga career points, which ranked him eleventh all-time when he left the league. The Skyliner organisation decided to retire Robertson's jersey number 23.

=== The Basketball Tournament ===
In 2017, Robertson played for the Matadors of The Basketball Tournament. He averaged 7.0 PPG to help the Matadors make it to the second round where they were bounced by eventual champion Overseas Elite.
