= Max Merz =

German basketball player (born 1994)

Personal information
- Born: February 1, 1994 (age 32) Regensburg, Germany
- Listed height: 1.83 m (6 ft 0 in)

Career information
- Playing career: 2009–2017
- Position: Point guard
- Number: 10

Career history
- 2009–2017: Skyliners Frankfurt

Career highlights
- FIBA Europe Cup champion (2016)

Max Christopher Merz (born February 1, 1994) is a German former professional basketball player. His last team was the Fraport Skyliners of the German Basketball Bundesliga. Merz played as point guard. Until 2009, Merz played in the youth department of MTV Kronberg. On April 28, 2017, it was announced that Merz would retire after the 2016–17 season.
