= Luca Campani =

Italian basketball player (born 1990)

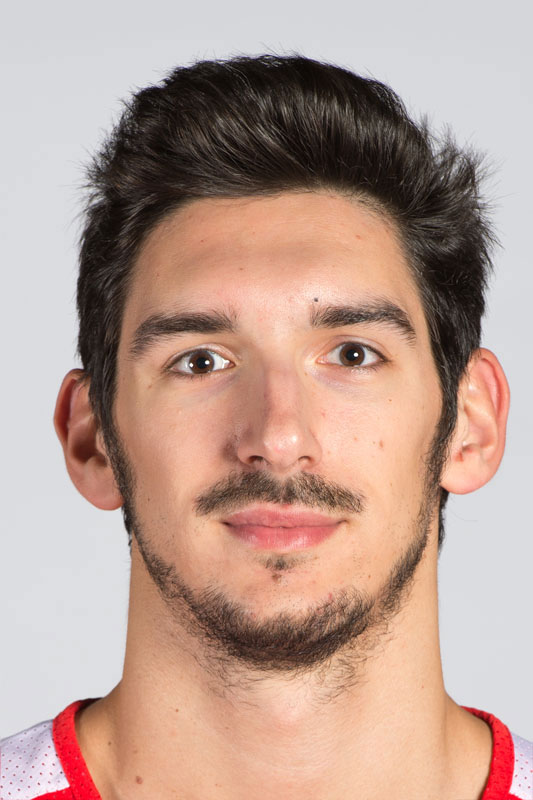

No. 14 – Pallacanestro Trieste
- Position: Power forward / center
- League: Lega Basket Serie A

Personal information
- Born: February 18, 1990 (age 36) Montecchio Emilia, Italy
- Listed height: 2.08 m (6 ft 10 in)
- Listed weight: 100 kg (220 lb)

Career information
- Playing career: 2008–present

Career history
- 2008–2010: Pallacanestro Reggiana
- 2010–2012: Fulgor Libertas Forlì
- 2012–2014: Sutor Montegranaro
- 2014–2015: Vanoli Cremona
- 2015–2017: Pallacanestro Varese
- 2018: Orlandina Basket
- 2018–2019: Sidigas Avellino
- 2019–2021: Basket Torino
- 2022–present: Trieste

Luca Campani (born February 18, 1990) is an Italian professional basketball player for Pallacanestro Trieste of the Italian Lega Basket Serie A (LBA).

== Career ==
On July 12, 2018, Campani signed with the Italian club Sidigas Avellino. He signed with Basket Torino in 2019.

Campani returned to the Serie A on January 16, 2022 signing with Pallacanestro Trieste to replace the injured Alessandro Lever.
