= 2025–26 Galatasaray S.K. (men's basketball) season =

Galatasaray MCT Technic
2025–26 season
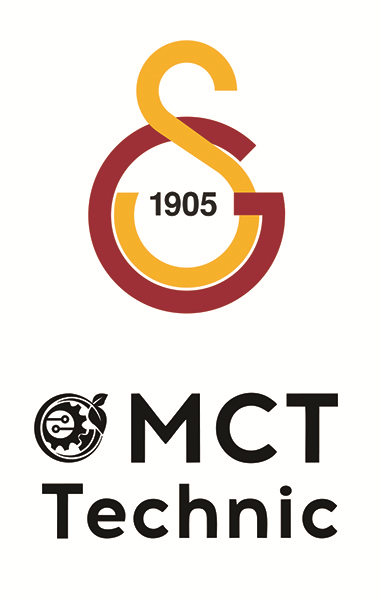
- President: Dursun Özbek
- Head coach: Yakup Sekizkök (until 30 December 2025); Gökhan Turan (caretaker) (from 31 December 2025 to 4 January 2026); Gianmarco Pozzecco (from 5 January 2026)
- Arena: Basketbol Gelişim Merkezi
- Basketbol Süper Ligi: 7th Seed
- Playoffs: Quarterfinals
- Basketball Champions League: Playoffs

The 2025–26 season is Galatasaray's 114th season in the existence of the club. The team plays in the Basketball Super League and in the Basketball Champions League.

== Season overview ==
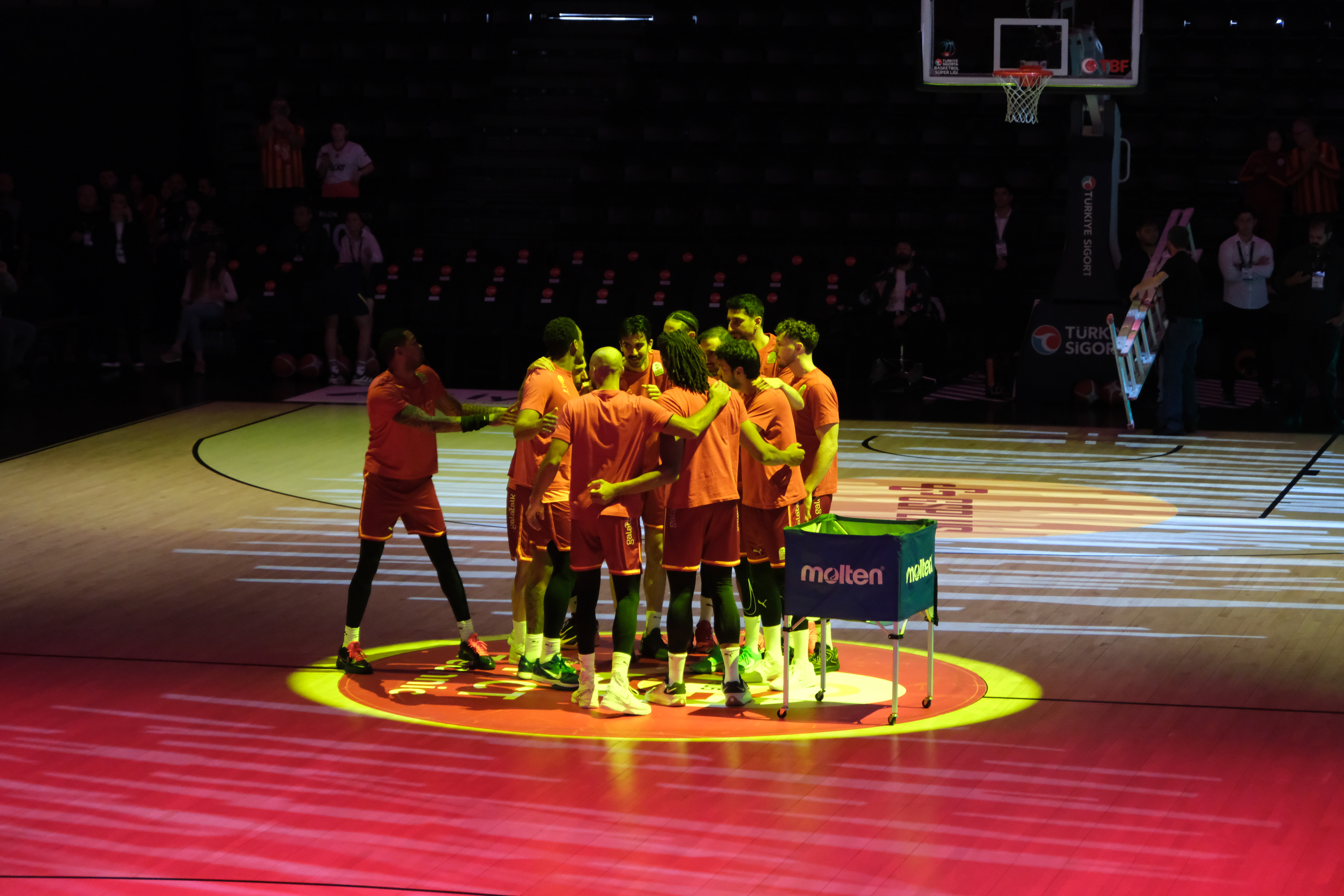
Galatasaray team (October 2025)

=== Pre-season ===
On 2 July, The Basketball Champions League draw was held in Lausanne, Switzerland. Galatasaray will compete in Group E.

On 3 July, It was announced that a new 1+1 year contract was signed with head coach Yakup Sekizkök.

On 15 August, Galatasaray MCT Technic's friendly match schedule has been announced.

On 20 August, Turkish Basketball Super League 2025–26 Season fixtures have been announced.

On 21 August, It was announced that Errick McCollum will be the team captain for the 2025–26 season.

== Players ==
=== Current roster ===
Note: Flags indicate national team eligibility at FIBA-sanctioned events. Players may hold other non-FIBA nationalities not displayed.

Galatasaray roster
Players
Coaches

Pos.	No.	Nat.	Name	Ht.	Wt.	Age
G	0	(United States)	Ellis, Boogie	1.88 m (6 ft 2 in)	86 kg (190 lb)	25 – 12 December 2000
SG	1	(United States)	Robinson, Jerome	1.93 m (6 ft 4 in)	86 kg (190 lb)	29 – 22 February 1997
G	3	(United States)	McCollum, Errick (C)	1.88 m (6 ft 2 in)	87 kg (192 lb)	38 – 22 January 1988
PG	4	(Turkey)	Tekin, Zekeriya Yiğit	1.88 m (6 ft 2 in)	75 kg (165 lb)	22 – 13 May 2004
PF	5	(Turkey)	Görener, Tibet	2.06 m (6 ft 9 in)	93 kg (205 lb)	23 – 27 July 2002
PG	8	(Turkey)	Korkmaz, Can	1.88 m (6 ft 2 in)	83 kg (183 lb)	33 – 21 October 1992
F	9	(United States)	Meeks, John	1.98 m (6 ft 6 in)	104 kg (229 lb)	27 – 16 March 1999
PG	10	(Turkey)	Öncel, Rıdvan	1.91 m (6 ft 3 in)	88 kg (194 lb)	29 – 21 February 1997
SG	12	(United States)	Palmer, James	1.96 m (6 ft 5 in)	94 kg (207 lb)	29 – 31 July 1996
PF	15	(Turkey)	Şekeroğlu, Efe	2.08 m (6 ft 10 in)		22 – 13 April 2004
C	16	(Turkey)	Dalgalı, Cihat	2.05 m (6 ft 9 in)		25 – 12 March 2001
G	17	(Turkey)	Erdem, Kerem	1.84 m (6 ft 0 in)		20 – 24 March 2006
G	19	(Turkey)	Tuncer, Buğrahan	1.93 m (6 ft 4 in)	90 kg (198 lb)	33 – 23 March 1993
G/F	22	(United States) (Italy)	Petrucelli, John	1.93 m (6 ft 4 in)	82 kg (181 lb)	33 – 27 October 1992
SG	24	(Turkey)	Alişan, Yaman	1.98 m (6 ft 6 in)		19 – 27 June 2006
C	33	(United States)	Gillespie, Freddie	2.08 m (6 ft 10 in)	111 kg (245 lb)	28 – 14 June 1997
PF	35	(United States)	White, Fabian	2.03 m (6 ft 8 in)	104 kg (229 lb)	27 – 29 November 1998
C	77	(Turkey)	Yaşar, Muhsin	2.08 m (6 ft 10 in)	96 kg (212 lb)	30 – 31 December 1995

Head coach

- (Italy) Gianmarco Pozzecco

Assistant coach(es)

- (Turkey) Cem Güven
- (Italy) Davide Bonora
- (Turkey) Gökhan Turan
- (Turkey) Batuhan Aybars Aksu

Athletic trainer(s)

- (Turkey) Ertan Bedir

Physiotherapist(s)

- (Turkey) Aşkın Dede
- (Turkey) Ali Can Kaşlı

Team manager

- (Turkey) İbrahim Tilki

Legend

- (C) Team captain
- Injured

- Roster
Updated: 28 April 2026

=== Depth chart ===
Pos.	Starting 5	Bench 1	Bench 2	Bench 3	Inactive
C	Freddie Gillespie	Muhsin Yaşar	Cihat Dalgalı
PF	Fabian White Jr.		Tibet Görener	Efe Şekeroğlu
SF	John Meeks	John Petrucelli
SG	James Palmer Jr.	Buğrahan Tuncer	Can Korkmaz	Yaman Alişan	Kerem Erdem
PG	Jerome Robinson	Errick McCollum	Rıdvan Öncel	Boogie Ellis	Zekeriya Yiğit Tekin

(colours: Turkish or homegrown players; foreign players)

=== Squad changes ===
==== In ====
No.	Pos.	Nat.	Name	Age	Moving from		Type	Ends	Transfer fee	Date	Source
3	CG	(United States)	Errick McCollum	37	Fenerbahçe Beko	(Turkey)	1+1 years	June 2026	Free	28 June 2025	
1	SG	(United States)	Jerome Robinson	28	Saint-Quentin	(France)	1+1 years	June 2026	Free	29 June 2025	
13	SF	(United States)	Christian Bishop	26	Basketball Nymburk	(Czech Republic)	1 year	June 2026	Free	1 July 2025	
77	C	(Turkey)	Muhsin Yaşar	29	Karşıyaka Basket	(Turkey)	1 year	June 2026	Free	4 July 2025	
35	C	(United States)	Fabian White	26	Manisa Basket	(Turkey)	1 year	June 2026	Free	6 July 2025	
10	PG	(Turkey)	Rıdvan Öncel	28	Anadolu Efes	(Turkey)	1 year	June 2026	Free	7 July 2025	
9	F	(United States)	John Meeks	26	Bnei Herzliya	(Israel)	1 year	June 2026	Free	28 July 2025	
5	PF	(Turkey)	Tibet Görener	23	SMU Mustangs	(United States)	Undisclosed	Undisclosed	Free	8 August 2025	
4	PG	(Turkey)	Zekeriya Yiğit Tekin	21	Siena Saints	(United States)	Undisclosed	Undisclosed	Free	8 August 2025	
15	PF	(Turkey)	Efe Şekeroğlu	21	Oklahoma Baptist University	(United States)	Undisclosed	Undisclosed	Free	8 August 2025	
16	C	(Turkey)	Cihat Dalgalı	24	Harem Spor Kulübü	(Turkey)	Undisclosed	Undisclosed	Free	8 August 2025	
33	C	(United States)	Freddie Gillespie	28	Olimpia Milano	(Italy)	1 year	June 2026	Free	22 September 2025	
11	C	(Nigeria)	Clifford Omoruyi	24	Maccabi Tel Aviv	(Israel)	1 year	June 2026	Free	12 December 2025	
22	G/F	(United States)	John Petrucelli	33	Trapani Shark	(Italy)	6 months	June 2026	Free	11 January 2026	
0	G	(United States)	Boogie Ellis	25	Dubai Basketball	(United Arab Emirates)	3 months	June 2026	Free	16 March 2026	

==== Out ====
No.	Pos.	Nat.	Name	Age	Moving to		Type	Transfer fee	Date	Source
61	G/F	(Turkey)	Göksenin Köksal	34	Bursaspor	(Turkey)	End of contract	Free	13 June 2025	
6	PF	(Turkey)	Sadık Emir Kabaca	24	Casademont Zaragoza	(Spain)	End of contract	Free	17 June 2025	
15	C	(Nigeria)	Ebuka Izundu	28	KK Crvena zvezda	(Serbia)	Mutual agreement	Free	20 June 2025	
3	G	(United States)	Tyrone Wallace	31	Xinjiang Flying Tigers	(China)	End of contract	Free	20 June 2025	
2	PF	(United States)	Michael Young	30	Bosna BH Telecom	(Bosnia and Herzegovina)	End of contract	Free	20 June 2025	
31	C	(Dominican Republic)	Ángel Delgado	30	Trabzonspor	(Turkey)	End of contract	Free	22 June 2025	
8	PF	(Latvia)	Roberts Blumbergs	27	Petkim Spor	(Turkey)	End of contract	Free	22 June 2025	
0	PG	(United States)	Otis Livingston II	28	Bàsquet Girona	(Spain)	End of contract	Free	26 June 2025	
9	PF	(Turkey)	Samet Geyik	32	Karşıyaka Basket	(Turkey)	End of contract	Free	26 June 2025	
32	G	(United States)	Rob Gray	31	Promitheas Patras	(Greece)	End of contract	Free	26 June 2025	
11	C	(Nigeria)	Clifford Omoruyi	24	PAOK	(Greece)	Mutual agreement	Free	30 January 2026	
7	PG	(United States)	Will Cummings	33	Free agent		Mutual agreement	Free	28 April 2026	

==== Out on loan ====
No.	Pos.	Nat.	Name	Age	Moving to		Type	Transfer fee	Date	Source
13	SF	(United States)	Christian Bishop	26	Karşıyaka Basket	(Turkey)	Undisclosed	Free	19 December 2025	

==== Contract extension ====
No.	Pos.	Nat.	Name	Age	Cont.	Date	Source
7	PG	(United States)	Will Cummings	32	1	2 July 2025	
12	SG	(United States)	James Palmer Jr.	28	1	5 July 2025	

== Club ==
=== Staff ===
As of 28 February 2026

Staff member	Position
Vladimir Micov	Sporting Director
İbrahim Tilki	Team Manager
Gianmarco Pozzecco	Head Coach
Cem Güven	Assistant Coach
Davide Bonora	Assistant Coach
Gökhan Turan	Assistant Coach
Batuhan Aybars Aksu	Assistant Coach
Ertan Bedir	Athletic Performance Coach
Emir Akmanlı	Communication and Media Specialist
Sinan Üstündağ	Doctor
Aşkın Dede	Physiotherapist
Ali Can Kaşlı	Physiotherapist
Burak Kozan	Masseur
Adnan Güney	Material Manager
Yunus Ün	Foreign Relations Officer
Lara Kratzer	Foreign Relations Officer
Vahit Yılmaz	Transportation Officer

=== Staff changes ===
Change	Date	Staff member	Staff position	Ref.
Out	28 November 2025	(Turkey) Ömer Yalçınkaya	General Manager	
In	25 December 2025	(Serbia) Vladimir Micov	Sporting Director	
Out	30 December 2025	(Turkey) Yakup Sekizkök	Head Coach	
In	31 December 2025	(Italy) Gianmarco Pozzecco	Head Coach	
In	5 January 2026	(Italy) Davide Bonora	Assistant Coach	

=== Uniform ===
Home	Away	Third

=== Sponsorship and kit manufacturers ===
- Supplier: Puma
- Name sponsor: MCT Technic
- Main sponsor: MCT Technic
- Back sponsor: —
- Sleeve sponsor: —
- Lateral sponsor: —
- Short sponsor: Galatalk
- Socks sponsor: —

== Pre-season and friendlies ==
28 August 2025 Friendly	Galatasaray MCT Technic (Turkish Basketball Federation)	86–83	(Turkish Basketball Federation) Petkim Spor	Zeytinburnu, Istanbul
15:00 TRT (UTC+3)	Scoring by quarter: 23–20, 25–26, 16–17, 22–20
	Pts: White 18; Rebs: three players 6 Asts: Korkmaz, Tuncer 4	Boxscore		Arena: Basketbol Gelişim Merkezi

4 September 2025 18. TÜBAD Mehmet Baturalp Turnuvası	Fenerbahçe Beko (Turkish Basketball Federation)	82–91	(Turkish Basketball Federation) Galatasaray MCT Technic
18:00 TRT (UTC+3)	Scoring by quarter: 21–22, 26–22, 13–32, 21–16
	Pts: Baldwin IV 14; Rebs: four players 5 Asts: Hall 5	Boxscore	Pts: Palmer 25; Rebs: Yaşar 10; Asts: Palmer 4

6 September 2025 18. TÜBAD Mehmet Baturalp Turnuvası	Galatasaray MCT Technic (Turkish Basketball Federation)	92–87	(United Arab Emirates Basketball Association) Dubai Basketball	Zeytinburnu, Istanbul
15:00 TRT (UTC+3)	Scoring by quarter: 25–18, 24–29, 20–22, 23–18
	Pts: Cummings 21; Rebs: White 4 Asts: Palmer 4	Boxscore		Arena: Basketbol Gelişim Merkezi

10 September 2025 Friendly	Galatasaray MCT Technic (Turkish Basketball Federation)	103–96	(Russian Basketball Federation) Lokomotiv Kuban	Belek, Antalya
14:00 TRT (UTC+3)
		Boxscore		Arena: Gloria Sports Arena

12 September 2025 Friendly	Galatasaray MCT Technic (Turkish Basketball Federation)	66–77	(Lithuanian Basketball Federation) Žalgiris Kaunas	Belek, Antalya
14:00 TRT (UTC+3)
		Boxscore		Arena: Gloria Sports Arena

14 September 2025 Friendly	Galatasaray MCT Technic (Turkish Basketball Federation)	91–91	(Turkish Basketball Federation) Tofaş	Belek, Antalya
14:00 TRT (UTC+3)
		Boxscore		Arena: Gloria Sports Arena

17 September 2025 ErokCUP	Galatasaray MCT Technic (Turkish Basketball Federation)	91–87	(Turkish Basketball Federation) Manisa Basket Divissa	Zeytinburnu, Istanbul
18:00 TRT (UTC+3)
		Boxscore		Arena: Basketbol Gelişim Merkezi

20 September 2025 ErokCUP	Esenler Erokspor (Turkish Basketball Federation)	90–87	(Turkish Basketball Federation) Galatasaray MCT Technic	Ataköy, Istanbul, Turkey
16:00 TRT (UTC+3)
		Boxscore		Arena: Sinan Erdem Dome

23 September 2025 Friendly	Galatasaray MCT Technic (Turkish Basketball Federation)	Cancelled	(Turkish Basketball Federation) Anadolu Efes
		Boxscore

== Competitions ==
=== Overall ===
Competition	Started round	Final position / round	First match	Last match
Basketbol Süper Ligi	Round 1	Quarterfinals	27 September 2025	30 May 2026
Basketball Champions League	Round 1	Playoffs	7 October 2025	15 April 2026

Source: Competitions

=== Overview ===
Competition	Record							
Competition	Pld	W	D	L	PF	PA	PD	Win %
Basketbol Süper Ligi	33	18	0	15	2,806	2,769	+37	54.55
Basketball Champions League	15	10	0	5	1,260	1,220	+40	66.67
Total	48	28	0	20	4,066	3,989	+77	58.33

Source: Competitions

=== Basketbol Süper Ligi ===
==== League table ====
Pos	Team	Pld	W	L	PF	PA	PD	Pts	Qualification or relegation
5	Türk Telekom	30	20	10	2609	2436	+173	50	Advance to playoffs
6	Trabzonspor	30	19	11	2585	2459	+126	49	Advance to playoffs
7	Galatasaray MCT Technic	30	17	13	2577	2515	+62	47	Advance to playoffs
8	Safiport Erokspor	30	17	13	2439	2348	+91	47	Advance to playoffs
9	Yukatel Merkezefendi Basket	30	12	18	2449	2593	−144	42	

Source: Basketbol Süper Ligi

==== Results summary ====
Overall						Home					Away				
Pld	W	L	PF	PA	PD	W	L	PF	PA	PD	W	L	PF	PA	PD
30	17	13	2577	2515	+62	10	5	1340	1245	+95	7	8	1237	1270	−33

Source: TBF.org.tr

==== Results by round ====
Round	1	2	3	4	5	6	7	8	9	10	11	12	13	14	15	16	17	18	19	20	21	22	23	24	25	26	27	28	29	30
Ground	A	H	A	H	H	A	H	A	H	A	H	A	H	A	H	H	A	H	A	A	H	A	H	A	H	A	H	A	H	A
Result	L	W	W	L	W	L	W	W	W	L	W	L	L	L	W	W	W	W	L	W	L	L	W	W	W	W	L	L	L	W
Position	11	10	7	9	6	7	8	5	5	6	5	7	9	9	9	8	8	6	8	7	7	8	8	7	7	7	7	7	7	7

Source: TBF.org.tr
A = Away; H = Home; W = Win; L = Loss

==== Matches ====
Win Loss

Note: All times are TRT (UTC+3) as listed by Turkish Basketball Federation.

27 September 2025 1	Bahçeşehir Koleji	93–86	Galatasaray MCT Technic	Ataköy, Istanbul, Turkey
15:30 TRT (UTC+3)	Scoring by quarter: 23–26, 19–21, 25–19, 26–20
	Pts: Flynn 23; Rebs: Williams 20; Asts: Homesley 6 PIR: Williams 29	Boxscore; Report	Pts: Palmer 27; Rebs: White 9 Asts: Cummings 7 PIR: White 24	Arena: Sinan Erdem Dome; Attendance: 2,150; Referees: Zafer Yılmaz, Özlem Yalman, Tolga Edis

3 October 2025 2	Galatasaray MCT Technic	93–91	Tofaş	Zeytinburnu, Istanbul
19:00 TRT (UTC+3)	Scoring by quarter: 20–24, 29–18, 23–21, 21–28
	Pts: Palmer 27; Rebs: Meeks 7 Asts: Öncel, Palmer 4 PIR: Palmer 21	Boxscore; Report	Pts: Blaževič 25; Rebs: Lewis 7 Asts: Pérez 5 PIR: Blaževič 29	Arena: Basketbol Gelişim Merkezi; Attendance: 1,571; Referees: Mehmet Karabilecen, Fatih Arslanoğlu, Duhan Köyiçi

12 October 2025 3	Petkim Spor	75–80	Galatasaray MCT Technic	Aliağa, İzmir
18:00 TRT (UTC+3)	Scoring by quarter: 21–20, 22–17, 22–24, 10–19
	Pts: Efianayi 16; Rebs: Sajus 8 Asts: Efianayi 7 PIR: Efianayi 18	Boxscore; Report	Pts: McCollum 21; Rebs: Bishop 8 Asts: Cummings, Palmer 6 PIR: Palmer 19	Arena: Enka Sport Hall; Attendance: 2,400; Referees: Mehmet Şahin, Mehmet Serdar Ünal, Murat Ciner

19 October 2025 4	Galatasaray MCT Technic	76–85	Fenerbahçe Beko	Zeytinburnu, Istanbul
15:30 TRT (UTC+3)	Scoring by quarter: 16–23, 26–21, 14–14, 20–27
	Pts: Palmer 20; Rebs: White 6 Asts: Palmer 7 PIR: White 19	Boxscore; Report	Pts: Biberović, Melli 18; Rebs: Melli 6 Asts: Baldwin IV 8 PIR: Biberović, Melli 21	Arena: Basketbol Gelişim Merkezi; Attendance: 7,558; Referees: Kerem Baki, Alper Özgök, Orhan Çağrı Hekimoğlu

26 October 2025 5	Galatasaray MCT Technic	103–83	Karşıyaka	Zeytinburnu, Istanbul
20:30 TRT (UTC+3)	Scoring by quarter: 26–21, 25–22, 28–17, 24–23
	Pts: Palmer 25; Rebs: White 5 Asts: Cummings 8 PIR: Cummings 24	Boxscore; Report	Pts: Moore 26; Rebs: Geyik 8 Asts: Chiozza 9 PIR: Moore 26	Arena: Basketbol Gelişim Merkezi; Attendance: 1,212; Referees: Ali Şakacı, Polat Parlak, Nazlı Çisil Güngör

1 November 2025 6	Türk Telekom	83–81	Galatasaray MCT Technic	Ulus, Ankara
15:30 TRT (UTC+3)	Scoring by quarter: 22–19, 24–21, 16–27, 21–14
	Pts: Allman 19; Rebs: Alexander 6 Asts: Smith 4 PIR: Allman 17	Boxscore; Report	Pts: Palmer 22; Rebs: White 11; Asts: Cummings 10; PIR: Palmer 25	Arena: Ankara Arena; Attendance: 4,759; Referees: Yener Yılmaz, Kaan Büyükçil, Alper Gökçebel

9 November 2025 7	Galatasaray MCT Technic	85–79	Mersin MSK	Zeytinburnu, Istanbul
18:00 TRT (UTC+3)	Scoring by quarter: 16–13, 25–20, 25–18, 19–28
	Pts: Meeks 25; Rebs: White 8 Asts: Öncel 6 PIR: Meeks 26	Boxscore; Report	Pts: Cobbs 25; Rebs: Olaseni 12; Asts: Cowan 5 PIR: Olaseni, White 21	Arena: Basketbol Gelişim Merkezi; Attendance: 1,160; Referees: Alper Altuğ Köselerli, Seher Ayşe Nur Yazıcıoğlu, Kerem Yılmaz

14 November 2025 8	Onvo Büyükçekmece	81–84	Galatasaray MCT Technic	Büyükçekmece, Istanbul
19:00 TRT (UTC+3)	Scoring by quarter: 24–23, 14–14, 21–27, 22–20
	Pts: van der Vuurst 17; Rebs: Bandaogo 7 Asts: van der Vuurst 12; PIR: van der Vuurst 28	Boxscore; Report	Pts: Palmer 22; Rebs: Gillespie 6 Asts: Palmer 5 PIR: Cummings 22	Arena: Gazanfer Bilge Sports Hall; Attendance: 1,288; Referees: Can Mavisu, Ziya Özorhon, Uğur Akyıldız

23 November 2025 9	Galatasaray MCT Technic	88–76	Esenler Erokspor	Zeytinburnu, Istanbul
15:30 TRT (UTC+3)	Scoring by quarter: 19–18, 24–13, 21–23, 24–22
	Pts: McCollum 22; Rebs: Bishop 7 Asts: Palmer 8 PIR: McCollum 22	Boxscore; Report	Pts: Galloway 19; Rebs: Cornelie 8 Asts: Crawford, Pangos 5 PIR: Galloway 16	Arena: Basketbol Gelişim Merkezi; Attendance: 1,000; Referees: Emin Moğulkoç, Ahmet Tatlıcı, Batuhan Söylemezoğlu

6 December 2025 10	Bursaspor Basketbol	91–87(OT)	Galatasaray MCT Technic	Nilüfer, Bursa
20:30 TRT (UTC+3)	Scoring by quarter: 29–23, 23–26, 14–13, 11–15, Overtime: 14–10
	Pts: Childress 24; Rebs: Childress 11; Asts: Childress 11; PIR: Childress 34	Boxscore; Report	Pts: Cummings 21; Rebs: McCollum 7 Asts: three players 3 PIR: McCollum 15	Arena: Tofaş Spor Salonu; Attendance: 6,954; Referees: Mehmet Şahin, Hüseyin Çelik, Musa Kazım Çetin

12 December 2025 11	Galatasaray MCT Technic	98–89	Yukatel Merkezefendi	Zeytinburnu, Istanbul
19:00 TRT (UTC+3)	Scoring by quarter: 25–22, 25–25, 20–23, 28–19
	Pts: Palmer 29; Rebs: White 7 Asts: Palmer 6 PIR: Palmer 34	Boxscore; Report	Pts: İlyasoğlu, Agva 17; Rebs: Bleijenbergh, Agva 6 Asts: İlyasoğlu 7 PIR: Agva 21	Arena: Basketbol Gelişim Merkezi; Attendance: 1,022; Referees: Fatih Arslanoğlu, Alper Altuğ Köselerli, Özge Şentürk Bayraktar

21 December 2025 12	Anadolu Efes	92–84	Galatasaray MCT Technic	Zeytinburnu, Istanbul
13:00 TRT (UTC+3)	Scoring by quarter: 25–20, 20–14, 25–28, 22–22
	Pts: Dessert 20; Rebs: Osmani 10; Asts: Weiler-Babb 8 PIR: Dessert 22	Boxscore; Report	Pts: McCollum 20; Rebs: McCollum 6 Asts: Palmer 6 PIR: McCollum 23	Arena: Basketbol Gelişim Merkezi; Attendance: 1,855; Referees: Can Mavisu, Mehmet Serdar Ünal, Ali Şakacı

27 December 2025 13	Galatasaray MCT Technic	89–101	Trabzonspor	Zeytinburnu, Istanbul
20:30 TRT (UTC+3)	Scoring by quarter: 23–27, 25–19, 15–27, 26–28
	Pts: Palmer 36; Rebs: White 9 Asts: Palmer 3 PIR: Palmer 32	Boxscore; Report	Pts: Reed 31; Rebs: four players 5 Asts: Taylor 7 PIR: Reed 31	Arena: Basketbol Gelişim Merkezi; Attendance: 2,103; Referees: Kerem Baki, Tolga Akkuşoğlu, Nazlı Çisil Güngör

4 January 2026 14	Manisa Basket	86–75	Galatasaray MCT Technic	Manisa
18:00 TRT (UTC+3)	Scoring by quarter: 18–24, 26–18, 24–15, 18–18
	Pts: Mintz 18; Rebs: Mãozinha 14; Asts: Smith 6 PIR: Mãozinha 25	Boxscore; Report	Pts: Palmer 18; Rebs: three players 5 Asts: Tuncer 5 PIR: three players 12	Arena: Muradiye Spor Salonu; Attendance: 3,100; Referees: Yener Yılmaz, Seher Ayşe Nur Yazıcıoğlu, Alper Gökçebel

10 January 2026 15	Galatasaray MCT Technic	89–73	Beşiktaş Gain	Zeytinburnu, Istanbul
13:00 TRT (UTC+3)	Scoring by quarter: 23–22, 24–22, 21–15, 21–14
	Pts: Gillespie, McCollum 13; Rebs: Gillespie, White 8 Asts: Palmer 7 PIR: Robinson 20	Boxscore; Report	Pts: Dotson 13; Rebs: Kamagate 8 Asts: Uğurlu 6 PIR: Kamagate 17	Arena: Basketbol Gelişim Merkezi; Attendance: 1,677; Referees: Mehmet Karabilecen, Fatih Arslanoğlu, Uğur Akyıldız

17 January 2026 16	Galatasaray MCT Technic	82–72	Bahçeşehir Koleji	Zeytinburnu, Istanbul
15:30 TRT (UTC+3)	Scoring by quarter: 20–18, 19–21, 35–12, 8–21
	Pts: Palmer 19; Rebs: White 8 Asts: Palmer 8 PIR: Palmer 24	Boxscore; Report	Pts: Flynn 13; Rebs: Cavanaugh 7 Asts: Flynn 6 PIR: three players 14	Arena: Basketbol Gelişim Merkezi; Attendance: 1,575; Referees: Kaan Büyükçil, Ziya Özorhon, Murat Ciner

24 January 2026 17	Tofaş	78–91	Galatasaray MCT Technic	Nilüfer, Bursa
20:30 TRT (UTC+3)	Scoring by quarter: 16–31, 14–20, 27–23, 21–17
	Pts: Pérez 12; Rebs: Blaževič 5 Asts: Floyd, Korkmaz 3 PIR: Pérez, Saybir 12	Boxscore; Report	Pts: Palmer 18; Rebs: Gillespie 13; Asts: Palmer 10; PIR: Gillespie 28	Arena: Tofaş Spor Salonu; Attendance: 4,063; Referees: Zafer Yılmaz, Hüseyin Çelik, Polat Parlak

1 February 2026 18	Galatasaray MCT Technic	90–61	Petkim Spor	Zeytinburnu, Istanbul
15:30 TRT (UTC+3)	Scoring by quarter: 20–12, 26–17, 20–15, 24–17
	Pts: Korkmaz 19; Rebs: Gillespie, Palmer 6 Asts: Palmer 6 PIR: Korkmaz 20	Boxscore; Report	Pts: Franke 17; Rebs: Franke 9 Asts: Efianayi 7 PIR: Franke 18	Arena: Basketbol Gelişim Merkezi; Attendance: 1,902; Referees: Emin Moğulkoç, Can Mavisu, Musa Kazım Çetin

8 February 2026 19	Fenerbahçe Beko	79–77	Galatasaray MCT Technic	Istanbul
15:30 TRT (UTC+3)	Scoring by quarter: 13–20, 19–13, 20–24, 27–20
	Pts: Biberović 21; Rebs: Melli 10; Asts: Baldwin IV 6 PIR: Biberović 18	Boxscore; Report	Pts: Palmer 16; Rebs: Gillespie 7 Asts: Palmer 7 PIR: Palmer 19	Arena: Ülker Sports and Event Hall; Attendance: 9,430; Referees: Özlem Yalman, Fatih Arslanoğlu, Batuhan Söylemezoğlu

15 February 2026 20	Karşıyaka	72–82	Galatasaray MCT Technic	İzmir
20:30 TRT (UTC+3)	Scoring by quarter: 11–22, 28–18, 9–22, 24–20
	Pts: Young 18; Rebs: Geyik 7 Asts: Moody 7 PIR: Young 19	Boxscore; Report	Pts: Petrucelli 16; Rebs: Gillespie 11; Asts: Tuncer 7 PIR: Petrucelli 18	Arena: Karşıyaka Arena; Attendance: 5,500; Referees: Mehmet Karabilecen, Orhan Çağrı Hekimoğlu, Nazlı Çisil Güngör

7 March 2026 21	Galatasaray MCT Technic	90–93	Türk Telekom	Zeytinburnu, Istanbul
13:00 TRT (UTC+3)	Scoring by quarter: 21–22, 21–27, 22–26, 26–18
	Pts: McCollum 27; Rebs: Gillespie, McCollum 6 Asts: Tuncer 8 PIR: McCollum 25	Boxscore; Report	Pts: Devoe 18; Rebs: Alexander 6 Asts: Allman 6 PIR: Devoe 21	Arena: Basketbol Gelişim Merkezi; Attendance: 1,844; Referees: Mehmet Şahin, Mehmet Serdar Ünal, Tolga Akkuşoğlu

15 March 2026 22	Mersin MSK	114–76	Galatasaray MCT Technic	Mersin
15:30 TRT (UTC+3)	Scoring by quarter: 31–16, 29–23, 30–24, 24–13
	Pts: Cruz 21; Rebs: Olaseni 14; Asts: Cowan 17; PIR: Özmızrak 23	Boxscore; Report	Pts: McCollum 18; Rebs: three players 7 Asts: White 5 PIR: McCollum 18	Arena: Servet Tazegül Spor Salonu; Attendance: 3,000; Referees: Mehmet Karabilecen, Hüseyin Çelik, Murat Ciner

21 March 2026 23	Galatasaray MCT Technic	98–94	Onvo Büyükçekmece	Zeytinburnu, Istanbul
15:30 TRT (UTC+3)	Scoring by quarter: 20–33, 27–25, 35–11, 16–25
	Pts: Palmer 23; Rebs: White 7 Asts: Korkmaz 6 PIR: White 23	Boxscore; Report	Pts: Lecque 21; Rebs: Bandaogo 9 Asts: van der Vuurst 8 PIR: Lecque 22	Arena: Basketbol Gelişim Merkezi; Attendance: 1,149; Referees: Ali Şakacı, Ahmet Tatlıcı, Halil Erkoç

28 March 2026 24	Esenler Erokspor	85–86	Galatasaray MCT Technic	Ataköy, Istanbul, Turkey
13:00 TRT (UTC+3)	Scoring by quarter: 22–17, 15–23, 23–22, 25–24
	Pts: Crawford 28; Rebs: Arna 6 Asts: Crawford 9 PIR: Crawford 26	Boxscore; Report	Pts: Robinson 18; Rebs: Yaşar 9 Asts: Palmer 7 PIR: Gillespie 16	Arena: Sinan Erdem Dome; Attendance: 376; Referees: Yener Yılmaz, Alper Altuğ Köselerli, Özge Şentürk Bayraktar

5 April 2026 25	Galatasaray MCT Technic	92–70	Bursaspor Basketbol	Zeytinburnu, Istanbul
15:30 TRT (UTC+3)	Scoring by quarter: 26–17, 21–22, 21–18, 24–13
	Pts: three players 15; Rebs: Gillespie 12; Asts: Palmer 8 PIR: Öncel 19	Boxscore; Report	Pts: Smith 19; Rebs: Nnoko 10; Asts: Smith 4 PIR: Smith 18	Arena: Basketbol Gelişim Merkezi; Attendance: 1,383; Referees: Kerem Baki, Kaan Büyükçil, Alper Gökçebel

23 April 2026 26	Yukatel Merkezefendi	80–90	Galatasaray MCT Technic	Denizli
19:00 TRT (UTC+3)	Scoring by quarter: 18–20, 14–27, 20–25, 28–18
	Pts: Badžim 25; Rebs: Bleijenbergh, Omić 5 Asts: Bleijenbergh 6 PIR: Badžim 28	Boxscore; Report	Pts: Meeks 17; Rebs: Öncel 5 Asts: Tuncer 9 PIR: Tuncer 27	Arena: Pamukkale University Arena; Attendance: 3,500; Referees: Mehmet Karabilecen, Ali Şakacı, Alper Özgök

20 April 2026 27	Galatasaray MCT Technic	80–87	Anadolu Efes	Zeytinburnu, Istanbul
19:00 TRT (UTC+3)	Scoring by quarter: 15–25, 26–18, 22–19, 17–25
	Pts: McCollum 21; Rebs: Meeks 6 Asts: Palmer 6 PIR: Gillespie 19	Boxscore; Report	Pts: Loyd 21; Rebs: three players 4 Asts: Dozier 7 PIR: Loyd 25	Arena: Basketbol Gelişim Merkezi; Attendance: 4,312; Referees: Emin Moğulkoç, Ziya Özorhon, Uğur Akyıldız

26 April 2026 28	Trabzonspor	79–69	Galatasaray MCT Technic	Trabzon
15:30 TRT (UTC+3)	Scoring by quarter: 23–19, 18–13, 20–14, 18–23
	Pts: Reed 17; Rebs: Reed 6 Asts: Reed 12; PIR: Reed 26	Boxscore; Report	Pts: Palmer 14; Rebs: White 8 Asts: Palmer 5 PIR: Yaşar 17	Arena: Hayri Gür Arena; Attendance: 6,700; Referees: Mehmet Şahin, Alper Altuğ Köselerli, Duhan Köyiçi

2 May 2026 29	Galatasaray MCT Technic	87–91	Manisa Basket	Zeytinburnu, Istanbul
13:00 TRT (UTC+3)	Scoring by quarter: 16–29, 26–17, 24–23, 21–22
	Pts: Korkmaz 19; Rebs: White 7 Asts: Palmer 5 PIR: Korkmaz 24	Boxscore; Report	Pts: Smith 25; Rebs: Johnson 10; Asts: Smith 13; PIR: Smith 28	Arena: Basketbol Gelişim Merkezi; Attendance: 1,215; Referees: Mehmet Serdar Ünal, Fatih Arslanoğlu, Orhan Çağrı Hekimoğlu

10 May 2026 30	Beşiktaş Gain	82–89	Galatasaray MCT Technic	Istanbul
18:00 TRT (UTC+3)	Scoring by quarter: 21–29, 14–16, 20–17, 27–27
	Pts: Dotson 15; Rebs: Žižić 7 Asts: Dotson 9 PIR: Dotson 24	Boxscore; Report	Pts: Palmer 22; Rebs: Gillespie 7 Asts: Korkmaz 4 PIR: Robinson, Palmer 21	Arena: BJK Akatlar Arena; Attendance: 1,728; Referees: Kerem Baki, Can Mavisu, Nazlı Çisil Güngör

==== Quarterfinals ====
Win Loss

26 May 2026 1	Beşiktaş Gain	108–83 (Series: 1–0)	Galatasaray MCT Technic	Istanbul
20:30 TRT (UTC+3)	Scoring by quarter: 29–18, 27–23, 32–21, 20–21
	Pts: Lemar 19; Rebs: Morgan, Žižić 5 Asts: Dotson 5 PIR: Morgan 23	Boxscore; Report	Pts: McCollum 23; Rebs: Gillespie, White 6 Asts: Tuncer 6 PIR: McCollum, Yaşar 23	Arena: BJK Akatlar Arena; Attendance: 3,000; Referees: Emin Moğulkoç, Seher Ayşe Nur Yazıcıoğlu, Uğur Akyıldız

28 May 2026 2	Galatasaray MCT Technic	78–75 (Series: 1–1)	Beşiktaş Gain	Zeytinburnu, Istanbul
20:30 TRT (UTC+3)	Scoring by quarter: 21–23, 19–16, 14–21, 24–15
	Pts: White 17; Rebs: White 8 Asts: Palmer, White 2 PIR: White 23	Boxscore; Report	Pts: Lemar 15; Rebs: Şanlı 6 Asts: Lemar 5 PIR: Dotson 16	Arena: Basketbol Gelişim Merkezi; Attendance: 4,113; Referees: Zafer Yılmaz, Mehmet Karabilecen, Polat Parlak

30 May 2026 3	Beşiktaş Gain	71–68 (Series: 2–1)	Galatasaray MCT Technic	Istanbul
20:30 TRT (UTC+3)	Scoring by quarter: 25–17, 14–15, 19–23, 13–13
	Pts: Lemar 14; Rebs: Žižić 10; Asts: Dotson 4 PIR: Žižić 17	Boxscore; Report	Pts: Palmer Jr. 19; Rebs: Gillespie 6 Asts: Robinson 4 PIR: White 15	Arena: BJK Akatlar Arena; Attendance: 2,310; Referees: Kerem Baki, Ziya Özorhon, Tolga Akkuşoğlu

=== Basketball Champions League ===
==== Regular season ====
===== Group E =====
Pos	Team	Pld	W	L	PF	PA	PD	Pts	Qualification	GSM	WUE	TS	IGO
1	(Turkish Basketball Federation) Galatasaray MCT Technic	6	5	1	534	474	+60	11	Advance to round of 16	—	89–83	79–80	94–82
2	(German Basketball Federation) Fitness First Würzburg Baskets	6	4	2	480	452	+28	10	Advance to play-ins	74–99	—	78–63	70–68
3	(Italian Basketball Federation) Pallacanestro Trieste	6	2	4	501	519	−18	8	Advance to play-ins	90–91	77–90	—	115–90
4	(Basketball Federation of Bosnia and Herzegovina) Igokea m:tel	6	1	5	452	522	−70	7		65–82	56–85	91–76	—

Source: FIBA
Legend: Blue = home team win; Red = away team win.

==== Regular Season Matches ====
Win Loss

7 October 2025 RS1	Galatasaray MCT Technic (Turkey)	94–82	(Bosnia and Herzegovina) Igokea m:tel	Zeytinburnu, Istanbul, Turkey
20:00 TRT (UTC+3)	Scoring by quarter: 21–18, 22–27, 29–10, 22–27
	Pts: White 26; Rebs: White 6 Asts: Cummings, Öncel 5 PIR: White 27	Boxscore; Report	Pts: Tyree 23; Rebs: three players 7 Asts: Tyree 8 PIR: Tyree 23	Arena: Basketbol Gelişim Merkezi; Attendance: 1,805; Referees: Antonio Conde (ESP), Andris Aunkrogers (LAT), Alberto Sánchez (ESP)

15 October 2025 RS2	Pallacanestro Trieste (Italy)	90–91	(Turkey) Galatasaray MCT Technic	Trieste, Italy
22:00 TRT (UTC+3)	Scoring by quarter: 17–21, 21–28, 29–21, 23–21
	Pts: Sissoko 18; Rebs: Sissoko 12; Asts: three players 4 PIR: Sissoko 28	Boxscore; Report	Pts: Cummings 25; Rebs: Gillespie 10; Asts: Palmer 7 PIR: White 28	Arena: PalaTrieste; Attendance: 5,018; Referees: Yohan Rosso (FRA), Fernando Calatrava (ESP), Blaž Zupančič (SLO)

21 October 2025 RS3	Galatasaray MCT Technic (Turkey)	89–83	(Germany) Fitness First Würzburg Baskets	Zeytinburnu, Istanbul, Turkey
20:00 TRT (UTC+3)	Scoring by quarter: 24–16, 20–24, 25–24, 20–19
	Pts: Palmer 24; Rebs: White 7 Asts: Cummings 6 PIR: Cummings, Palmer 22	Boxscore; Report	Pts: Carr 20; Rebs: Thompson 8 Asts: Carr, Ivey 3 PIR: Carr 18	Arena: Basketbol Gelişim Merkezi; Attendance: 1,579; Referees: Luis Castillo (ESP), Martin Vulić (CRO), Ventsislav Velikov (BUL)

4 November 2025 RS4	Fitness First Würzburg Baskets (Germany)	74–99	(Turkey) Galatasaray MCT Technic	Würzburg, Germany
20:30 TRT (UTC+3)	Scoring by quarter: 15–23, 25–26, 13–27, 21–23
	Pts: Muenkat 19; Rebs: Muenkat 8 Asts: Carr 7 PIR: Carr 18	Boxscore; Report	Pts: Cummings 19; Rebs: Palmer 8 Asts: Palmer 8 PIR: Palmer 29	Arena: Tectake Arena; Attendance: 3,140; Referees: Antonio Conde (ESP), Martin Horozov (BUL), Georgios Poursanidis (GRE)

18 November 2025 RS5	Galatasaray MCT Technic (Turkey)	79–80	(Italy) Pallacanestro Trieste	Zeytinburnu, Istanbul, Turkey
20:00 TRT (UTC+3)	Scoring by quarter: 18–18, 21–21, 22–18, 18–23
	Pts: McCollum 26; Rebs: Bishop, White 7 Asts: Robinson, Korkmaz 3 PIR: McCollum 18	Boxscore; Report	Pts: Sissoko 21; Rebs: Sissoko 10; Asts: Ruzzier, Brown 7 PIR: Sissoko 30	Arena: Basketbol Gelişim Merkezi; Attendance: 1,280; Referees: Boris Krejic (SLO), Luis Castillo (ESP), Mihkel Manniste (EST)

17 December 2025 RS6	Igokea m:tel (Bosnia and Herzegovina)	65–82	(Turkey) Galatasaray MCT Technic	Laktaši, Bosnia and Herzegovina
20:30 TRT (UTC+3)	Scoring by quarter: 11–22, 22–19, 14–20, 18–21
	Pts: Bess, Jeremić 17; Rebs: Antunović, Bess 7 Asts: Popović 6 PIR: Bess 17	Boxscore; Report	Pts: Tuncer 16; Rebs: Gillespie 9 Asts: Tuncer 5 PIR: Tuncer 19	Arena: Laktaši Sports Hall; Referees: Julio Anaya (PAN), Edgard Ceccarelli (FRA), Zdenko Tomasovic (SVK)

==== Round of 16 ====
===== Group I =====
Pos	Team	Pld	W	L	PF	PA	PD	Pts	Qualification	VIL	GSM	MSB	HOL
1	(Lithuanian Basketball Federation) Rytas	6	4	2	560	508	+52	10	Advance to quarter-finals	—	85–89	101–81	106–81
2	(Turkish Basketball Federation) Galatasaray MCT Technic	6	4	2	520	501	+19	10	Advance to quarter-finals	81–90	—	83–90	86–81
3	(French Federation of Basketball) Le Mans	6	4	2	538	527	+11	10		78–72	81–94	—	102–92
4	(Israeli Basketball Association) Hapoel Netanel Holon	6	0	6	511	593	−82	6		98–106	74–87	85–106	—

Source: Round of 16 Standings
Legend: Blue = home team win; Red = away team win.

==== Round of 16 Matches ====
Win Loss

21 January 2026 R16–1	Galatasaray MCT Technic (Turkey)	83–90	(France) Le Mans	Zeytinburnu, Istanbul, Turkey
20:00 TRT (UTC+3)	Scoring by quarter: 19–31, 24–26, 23–19, 17–14
	Pts: White 22; Rebs: McCollum 11; Asts: Korkmaz 7 PIR: McCollum 25	Boxscore; Report	Pts: Berhanemeskel 15; Rebs: Dufeal 6 Asts: Hudgins 6 PIR: Williams 19	Arena: Basketbol Gelişim Merkezi; Attendance: 685; Referees: Luis Castillo (ESP), Peter Praksch (HUN), Michal Proc (POL)

27 January 2026 R16–2	Rytas (Lithuania)	85–89(OT)	(Turkey) Galatasaray MCT Technic	Vilnius, Lithuania
20:30 TRT (UTC+3)	Scoring by quarter: 20–16, 13–23, 24–16, 19–21, Overtime: 9–13
	Pts: Harding 28; Rebs: four players 6 Asts: Smith 7 PIR: Harding, Smith 21	Boxscore; Report	Pts: McCollum 24; Rebs: White 14; Asts: Korkmaz 6 PIR: Meeks 22	Arena: Twinsbet Arena; Attendance: 5,500; Referees: Wojciech Liszka (POL), Lorenzo Baldini (ITA), Martin Vulić (CRO)

4 February 2026 R16–3	Galatasaray MCT Technic (Turkey)	86–81	(Israel) Hapoel Netanel Holon	Zeytinburnu, Istanbul, Turkey
20:00 TRT (UTC+3)	Scoring by quarter: 19–25, 21–18, 22–25, 24–13
	Pts: McCollum 18; Rebs: Gillespie 8 Asts: Robinson 5 PIR: McCollum 17	Boxscore; Report	Pts: Munford 21; Rebs: Sanogo 12; Asts: Munford 6 PIR: Munford 28	Arena: Basketbol Gelişim Merkezi; Referees: Antonio Conde (ESP), Martin Horozov (BUL), Paulo Marques (POR)

11 February 2026 R16–4	Le Mans (France)	81–94	(Turkey) Galatasaray MCT Technic	Le Mans, France
22:00 TRT (UTC+3)	Scoring by quarter: 22–18, 26–32, 21–18, 12–26
	Pts: DiLeo 18; Rebs: Williams 8 Asts: Hudgins 7 PIR: DiLeo 18	Boxscore; Report	Pts: Tuncer 22; Rebs: Palmer 6 Asts: Meeks, Palmer 3 PIR: Tuncer 22	Arena: Antarès; Attendance: 3,902; Referees: Peter Praksch (HUN), Andris Aunkrogers (LAT), Lorenzo Baldini (ITA)

10 March 2026 R16–5	Hapoel Netanel Holon (Israel)	74–87	(Turkey) Galatasaray MCT Technic	Samokov, Bulgaria
19:30 TRT (UTC+3)	Scoring by quarter: 14–22, 19–15, 20–27, 21–23
	Pts: McRae, Sanogo 18; Rebs: Sanogo 12; Asts: McRae, Munford 3 PIR: Sanogo 26	Boxscore; Report	Pts: Meeks 26; Rebs: Gillespie, McCollum 6 Asts: Palmer 7 PIR: Meeks 25	Arena: Arena SamElyon; Referees: Luis Castillo (ESP), Marius Ciulin (ROU), Josip Jurcevic (CRO)

18 March 2026 R16–6	Galatasaray MCT Technic (Turkey)	81–90	(Lithuania) Rytas	Zeytinburnu, Istanbul, Turkey
20:00 TRT (UTC+3)	Scoring by quarter: 22–23, 19–25, 21–16, 19–26
	Pts: McCollum 26; Rebs: White 6 Asts: Palmer 8 PIR: McCollum, Palmer 25	Boxscore; Report	Pts: Masiulis 25; Rebs: Lukošius 7 Asts: Sargiūnas, Smith 5 PIR: Lukošius 27	Arena: Basketbol Gelişim Merkezi; Referees: Mārtiņš Kozlovskis (LAT), Julio Anaya (PAN), Ariadna Chueca (ESP)

==== Quarterfinals ====
Win Loss

1 April 2025 1	La Laguna Tenerife (Spain)	84–83 (Series: 1–0)	(Turkey) Galatasaray MCT Technic	Tenerife, Spain
22:00 TRT (UTC+3)	Scoring by quarter: 23–15, 17–26, 24–15, 20–27
	Pts: Mills 20; Rebs: Scrubb 7 Asts: Huertas 5 PIR: Mills 20	Boxscore; Report	Pts: McCollum 17; Rebs: Palmer 8 Asts: Palmer 6 PIR: Palmer 19	Arena: Santiago Martín; Referees: Yohan Rosso (FRA), Gatis Salins (LAT), Paulo Marques (POR)

8 April 2025 2	Galatasaray MCT Technic (Turkey)	64–62 (Series: 1–1)	(Spain) La Laguna Tenerife	Bakırköy, Istanbul, Turkey
20:00 TRT (UTC+3)	Scoring by quarter: 14–13, 16–14, 17–13, 17–22
	Pts: Meeks 17; Rebs: White 7 Asts: Palmer 5 PIR: Meeks 23	Boxscore; Report	Pts: Shermadini 12; Rebs: Abromaitis 10; Asts: Huertas 10; PIR: Abromaitis 17	Arena: Sinan Erdem Dome; Attendance: 7,122; Referees: Ademir Zurapovic (BIH), Wojciech Liszka (POL), Boris Krejic (SLO)

15 April 2025 3	La Laguna Tenerife (Spain)	99–59 (Series: 2–1)	(Turkey) Galatasaray MCT Technic	Tenerife, Spain
22:00 TRT (UTC+3)	Scoring by quarter: 28–16, 18–12, 26–20, 27–11
	Pts: Shermadini 20; Rebs: Shermadini 14; Asts: Huertas 7 PIR: Shermadini 35	Boxscore; Report	Pts: Tuncer 14; Rebs: Öncel 7 Asts: Palmer 5 PIR: Yaşar 15	Arena: Santiago Martín; Attendance: 5,100; Referees: Ademir Zurapovic (BIH), Julio Anaya (PAN), Martins Kozlovskis (LAT)

== Statistics ==
Legend
GP	Games played	GS	Games started	MPG	Minutes per game
FG%	Field-goal percentage	3FG%	3-point field-goal percentage	FT%	Free-throw percentage
RPG	Rebounds per game	APG	Assists per game	SPG	Steals per game
BPG	Blocks per game	PPG	Points per game	PIR	PIR per game

Player	Left during season

=== Basketbol Süper Ligi ===
Player	GP	GS	MPG	2FG%	3FG%	FT%	RPG	APG	SPG	BPG	PPG	PIR
Will Cummings												
Cihat Dalgalı												
Boogie Ellis												
Kerem Erdem												
Freddie Gillespie												
Tibet Görener												
Can Korkmaz												
Errick McCollum												
John Meeks												
Rıdvan Öncel												
James Palmer Jr.												
John Petrucelli												
Jerome Robinson												
Efe Şekeroğlu												
Zekeriya Yiğit Tekin												
Buğrahan Tuncer												
Fabian White Jr.												
Alişan Yaman												
Muhsin Yaşar												
Christian Bishop	8		12:34	.700	—	.715	3.3	0.3	1.1	0.1	4.1	7.6
Clifford Omoruyi	5		11:08	.500	—	.600	1.4	0.2	0.2	0.6	3.4	4.0
TOTAL	—											

Source: Basketbol Süper Ligi

=== Basketball Champions League ===
Player	GP	GS	MPG	2FG%	3FG%	FT%	RPG	APG	SPG	BPG	PPG	PIR
Will Cummings	6	5	22:20	.474	.350	.905	2.5	4.0	0.7	—	12.7	13.0
Cihat Dalgalı	2	—	08:00	—	.333	.500	1.5	—	—	0.5	2.0	2.0
Boogie Ellis	2	—	14:45	.579	.417	.563	2.5	1.8	1.3	—	9.8	11.5
Freddie Gillespie	13	12	20:09	.544	—	.429	5.2	0.8	0.3	1.2	10.8	5.0
Tibet Görener	4	2	13:00	.667	—	.667	2.5	0.8	0.3	—	1.8	2.5
Can Korkmaz	13	5	16:37	.500	.389	.917	1.3	2.2	0.9	—	4.7	6.5
Errick McCollum	12	1	24:05	.488	.361	.843	3.5	1.8	1.0	0.2	16.1	13.8
John Meeks	15	—	21:24	.548	.490	.808	3.6	0.6	0.3	0.1	9.3	10.2
Rıdvan Öncel	11	4	15:16	.450	.364	.600	1.5	1.9	0.5	—	3.3	3.9
James Palmer Jr.	14	13	31:17	.417	.354	.500	4.9	5.0	1.6	0.2	13.4	14.0
John Petrucelli	8	6	12:30	.444	.222	.666	1.4	0.6	1.0	0.3	2.3	2.1
Jerome Robinson	9	6	19:00	.517	.304	.810	1.4	1.7	0.3	0.3	7.6	6.7
Zekeriya Yiğit Tekin	2	1	11:30	.667	—	.667	2.0	—	—	—	3.0	2.5
Buğrahan Tuncer	13	1	13:51	.462	.563	1.000	2.0	2.1	0.4	—	8.5	8.6
Fabian White Jr.	15	15	25:28	.517	.377	.639	6.1	0.7	0.4	0.6	11.5	12.0
Muhsin Yaşar	15	1	11:52	.510	—	.680	2.7	0.4	0.4	0.8	4.6	6.4
Christian Bishop	5	2	14:48	.750	—	.833	3.8	0.4	0.4	0.2	6.8	9.8
Clifford Omoruyi	1	1	5:00	1.000	—	—	3.0	—	—	—	4.0	4.0
TOTAL	—			.502	.370	.738	38.0	17.1	7.1	3.5	84.0	93.7

Source: Basketball Champions League

=== Head coaches records ===
Head Coach	Competition	G	W	D	L	PF	PA	PD	Win %
Yakup Sekizkök	Basketbol Süper Ligi	13	7	0	6	1134	1119	+15	.538
Yakup Sekizkök	Basketball Champions League	6	5	0	1	534	474	+60	.833
Yakup Sekizkök	Total	19	12	0	7	1668	1593	+75	.632
Gökhan Turan	Basketbol Süper Ligi	1	0	0	1	75	86	−11	.000
Gökhan Turan	Total	1	0	0	1	75	86	−11	.000
Gianmarco Pozzecco	Basketbol Süper Ligi	18	11	0	8	1597	1564	+33	.579
Gianmarco Pozzecco	Basketball Champions League	9	5	0	4	726	746	-20	.556
Gianmarco Pozzecco	Total	28	16	0	12	2323	2310	+13	.571

== See also ==
- Commons:Category:2025–26 Galatasaray Basketball season
