= 2026 BSL Playoffs =

BSL Playoffs
- Season: 2025–26
- Dates: 26 May – 19 June 2026
- Games played: 22
- Teams: 8

Finals
- Champions: Fenerbahçe Beko (13th title)
- Runners-up: Beşiktaş Gain
- Semi-finalists: Anadolu Efes, Bahçeşehir Koleji
- Finals MVP: (United States) Wade Baldwin IV

2026 Basketbol Süper Ligi (BSL) Playoffs was the final phase of the 2025–26 Basketbol Süper Ligi season. It began on 26 May 2026 and ended on 19 June 2026.

The eight highest placed teams of the regular season qualified for the playoffs. In the quarter-finals a best-of-three was played, in the semi-finals and finals a best-of-five playoff format was used.

== Qualified teams ==
Pos	Team	Pld	W	L	PF	PA	PD	Pts	Qualification or relegation
1	Fenerbahçe Beko (C)	30	25	5	2644	2393	+251	55	Advance to playoffs
2	Beşiktaş Gain	30	25	5	2602	2304	+298	55	Advance to playoffs
3	Bahçeşehir Koleji	30	21	9	2495	2349	+146	51	Advance to playoffs
4	Anadolu Efes	30	20	10	2650	2446	+204	50	Advance to playoffs
5	Türk Telekom	30	20	10	2609	2436	+173	50	Advance to playoffs
6	Trabzonspor	30	19	11	2585	2459	+126	49	Advance to playoffs
7	Galatasaray MCT Technic	30	17	13	2577	2515	+62	47	Advance to playoffs
8	Safiport Erokspor	30	17	13	2439	2348	+91	47	Advance to playoffs

Source: Basketbol Süper Ligi
(C) Champions

== Bracket ==
Quarterfinals
1	Fenerbahçe Beko	2
8	Safiport Erokspor	0
4	Anadolu Efes	2
5	Türk Telekom	0
2	Beşiktaş Gain	2
7	Galatasaray MCT Technic	1
3	Bahçeşehir Koleji	2
6	Trabzonspor	0

Semifinals
1	Fenerbahçe Beko	3
4	Anadolu Efes	1
2	Beşiktaş Gain	3
3	Bahçeşehir Koleji	2

Finals
1	Fenerbahçe Beko	3
2	Beşiktaş Gain	1

== Quarterfinals ==
=== (1) Fenerbahçe Beko vs. (8) Safiport Erokspor ===
27 May 2026	Fenerbahçe Beko	94–72 (Series: 1–0)	Safiport Erokspor	Istanbul
20:30 TRT (UTC+3)	Scoring by quarter: 28–19, 17–13, 21–17, 28–23
	Pts: Horton-Tucker 19; Rebs: Jantunen 8 Asts: Hall, Horton-Tucker 4 PIR: Horton-Tucker, Jantunen 19	Boxscore	Pts: Thurman 14; Rebs: three players 5 Asts: Arna, Pangos 4 PIR: Thurman 14	Arena: Ülker Sports Arena; Attendance: 2,192; Referees: Yener Yılmaz, Ahmet Tatlıcı, Tolga Akkuşoğlu

29 May 2026	Safiport Erokspor	73–96 (Series: 0−2)	Fenerbahçe Beko	Istanbul
20:30 TRT (UTC+3)	Scoring by quarter: 11−25, 26−39, 19−15, 17−17
	Pts: Cornelie 20; Rebs: Arna, Cornelie 5 Asts: Love 6 PIR: Cornelie 22	Boxscore	Pts: Mahmutoğlu 21; Rebs: Colson 7 Asts: Baldwin IV 8 PIR: Horton-Tucker 22	Arena: Sinan Erdem Dome; Attendance: 668; Referees: Alper Altuğ Köselerli, Kaan Büyükçil, Özge Şentürk Bayraktar

=== (2) Beşiktaş Gain vs. (7) Galatasaray MCT Technic ===
26 May 2026	Beşiktaş Gain	108–83 (Series: 1–0)	Galatasaray MCT Technic	Istanbul
20:30 TRT (UTC+3)	Scoring by quarter: 29–18, 27–23, 32–21, 20–21
	Pts: Lemar 19; Rebs: Morgan, Žižić 5 Asts: Dotson 5 PIR: Morgan 23	Boxscore	Pts: McCollum 23; Rebs: Gillespie, White 6 Asts: Tuncer 6 PIR: McCollum, Yaşar 23	Arena: Akatlar Arena; Attendance: 3,000; Referees: Emin Moğulkoç, Seher Ayşe Nur Yazıcıoğlu, Uğur Akyıldız

28 May 2026	Galatasaray MCT Technic	78–75 (Series: 1–1)	Beşiktaş Gain	Istanbul
20:30 TRT (UTC+3)	Scoring by quarter: 21–23, 19–16, 14–21, 24–15
	Pts: White 17; Rebs: White 8 Asts: Palmer, White 2 PIR: White 23	Boxscore	Pts: Lemar 15; Rebs: Şanlı 6 Asts: Lemar 5 PIR: Dotson 16	Arena: Basketball Development Center; Attendance: 4,113; Referees: Zafer Yılmaz, Mehmet Karabilecen, Polat Parlak

30 May 2026	Beşiktaş Gain	71–68 (Series: 2–1)	Galatasaray MCT Technic	Istanbul
20:30 TRT (UTC+3)	Scoring by quarter: 25–17, 14–15, 19–23, 13–13
	Pts: Lemar 14; Rebs: Žižić 10; Asts: Dotson 4 PIR: Žižić 17	Boxscore	Pts: Palmer Jr. 19; Rebs: Gillespie 6 Asts: Robinson 4 PIR: White 15	Arena: Akatlar Arena; Attendance: 2,310; Referees: Kerem Baki, Ziya Özorhon, Tolga Akkuşoğlu

=== (3) Bahçeşehir Koleji vs. (6) Trabzonspor ===
26 May 2026	Bahçeşehir Koleji	91–65 (Series: 1–0)	Trabzonspor	Istanbul
18:00 TRT (UTC+3)	Scoring by quarter: 26–19, 21–15, 20–9, 24–22
	Pts: Hale 22; Rebs: Williams 12; Asts: Flynn 6 PIR: Hale 20	Boxscore	Pts: Hamm Jr. 16; Rebs: Tinkle 7 Asts: Taylor, Tinkle 3 PIR: Tinkle 14	Arena: Sinan Erdem Dome; Attendance: 850; Referees: Özlem Yalman, Fatih Arslanoğlu, Can Mavisu

28 May 2026	Trabzonspor	78–94 (Series: 0–2)	Bahçeşehir Koleji	Trabzon
18:00 TRT (UTC+3)	Scoring by quarter: 22–29, 26–19, 16–26, 14–20
	Pts: Reed 28; Rebs: Taylor 8 Asts: Taylor 7 PIR: Taylor 20	Boxscore	Pts: Homesley 27; Rebs: Williams 12; Asts: Flynn 5 PIR: Homesley 30	Arena: Hayri Gür Arena; Attendance: 2,882; Referees: Mehmet Şahin, Mehmet Serdar Ünal, Duhan Köyiçi

=== (4) Anadolu Efes vs. (5) Türk Telekom ===
27 May 2026	Anadolu Efes	86–75 (Series: 1−0)	Türk Telekom	Istanbul
18:00 TRT (UTC+3)	Scoring by quarter: 20−21, 25−15, 23−25, 18−14
	Pts: Dozier 16; Rebs: Osmani 7 Asts: Larkin 11; PIR: Poirier 21	Boxscore	Pts: Usher 14; Rebs: Alexander 9 Asts: Devoe 6 PIR: Alexander 20	Arena: Basketball Development Center; Attendance: 1,165; Referees: Kerem Baki, Ziya Özorhon, Nazlı Çisil Güngör

29 May 2026	Türk Telekom	70–77 (Series: 0−2)	Anadolu Efes	Ankara
18:00 TRT (UTC+3)	Scoring by quarter: 17−16, 14−21, 23−24, 16−16
	Pts: Smith 18; Rebs: Usher 7 Asts: Devoe 8 PIR: Simonović, Usher 22	Boxscore	Pts: Larkin 20; Rebs: Weiler-Babb 10; Asts: Larkin 4 PIR: Poirier 26	Arena: Ankara Arena; Attendance: 6,422; Referees: Mehmet Şahin, Mehmet Serdar Ünal, Duhan Köyiçi

== Semifinals ==
=== (1) Fenerbahçe Beko vs. (4) Anadolu Efes ===
1 June 2026	Fenerbahçe Beko	60–59 (Series: 1–0)	Anadolu Efes	Istanbul
20:00 TRT (UTC+3)	Scoring by quarter: 6−21, 15−13, 15−17, 24−8
	Pts: Biberović, Melli 16; Rebs: Birch, Melli 4 Asts: Hall 8 PIR: Melli 15	Boxscore	Pts: Dozier 17; Rebs: Dozier, Poirier 5 Asts: Larkin 7 PIR: Poirier 17	Arena: Ülker Sports Arena; Attendance: 4,607; Referees: Emin Moğulkoç, Seher Ayşe Nur Yazıcıoğlu, Uğur Akyıldız

3 June 2026	Fenerbahçe Beko	73–72 (Series: 2–0)	Anadolu Efes	Istanbul
20:00 TRT (UTC+3)	Scoring by quarter: 16−18, 16−29, 24−11, 17−14
	Pts: Biberović 20; Rebs: Hall 7 Asts: Baldwin IV 4 PIR: Biberović 19	Boxscore	Pts: Loyd 19; Rebs: Lloyd 6 Asts: Lloyd 4 PIR: Lloyd 20	Arena: Ülker Sports Arena; Attendance: 11,466; Referees: Hüseyin Çelik, Fatih Arslanoğlu, Murat Ciner

5 June 2026	Anadolu Efes	102–93 (Series: 1–2)	Fenerbahçe Beko	Istanbul
20:00 TRT (UTC+3)	Scoring by quarter: 29−26, 20−24, 27−17, 26−26
	Pts: Larkin 31; Rebs: Yılmaz 6 Asts: Larkin 5 PIR: Larkin 31	Boxscore	Pts: Biberović 29; Rebs: Birch 5 Asts: Baldwin IV, Hall 6 PIR: Baldwin IV, Biberović 28	Arena: Basketball Development Center; Attendance: 4,976; Referees: Yener Yılmaz, Ahmet Tatlıcı, Tolga Edis

7 June 2026	Anadolu Efes	93–102(OT) (Series: 1–3)	Fenerbahçe Beko	Istanbul
20:00 TRT (UTC+3)	Scoring by quarter: 24−25, 25−19, 18−19, 20−24, Overtime: 6−15
	Pts: Loyd 16; Rebs: Osmani 6 Asts: Larkin 5 PIR: Lloyd 21	Boxscore	Pts: Baldwin IV 32; Rebs: Birch 9 Asts: Biberović 5 PIR: Baldwin IV 32	Arena: Basketball Development Center; Attendance: 4,400; Referees: Kerem Baki, Ziya Özorhon, Tolga Akkuşoğlu

=== (2) Beşiktaş Gain vs. (3) Bahçeşehir Koleji ===
2 June 2026	Beşiktaş Gain	82–79 (Series: 1–0)	Bahçeşehir Koleji	Istanbul
20:00 TRT (UTC+3)	Scoring by quarter: 21–20, 14–12, 18–21, 29–26
	Pts: Morgan 13; Rebs: Arslan 5 Asts: Dotson 7 PIR: Arslan, Dotson 16	Boxscore	Pts: Flynn 23; Rebs: Cavanaugh 9 Asts: Flynn, Hale 4 PIR: Flynn 18	Arena: Akatlar Arena; Attendance: 2,600; Referees: Alper Altuğ Köselerli, Kaan Büyükçil, Özge Şentürk Bayraktar

4 June 2026	Beşiktaş Gain	79–101 (Series: 1–1)	Bahçeşehir Koleji	Istanbul
20:00 TRT (UTC+3)	Scoring by quarter: 20–22, 28–21, 16–31, 15–27
	Pts: Lemar 14; Rebs: Žižić 8 Asts: Dotson, Uğurlu 3 PIR: Brown, Žižić 12	Boxscore	Pts: Flynn 20; Rebs: Mitchell 7 Asts: Williams 8 PIR: Williams 20	Arena: Akatlar Arena; Attendance: 1,950; Referees: Mehmet Şahin, Mehmet Serdar Ünal, Nazlı Çisil Güngör

6 June 2026	Bahçeşehir Koleji	98–95(OT) (Series: 2–1)	Beşiktaş Gain	Istanbul
20:00 TRT (UTC+3)	Scoring by quarter: 22–15, 18–31, 23–12, 15–20, Overtime: 20–17
	Pts: Flynn 27; Rebs: Williams 10; Asts: Flynn, Hale 5 PIR: Flynn 28	Boxscore	Pts: Lemar, Mathews 18; Rebs: Brown 7 Asts: Uğurlu 4 PIR: Uğurlu 20	Arena: Sinan Erdem Dome; Attendance: 2,182; Referees: Özlem Yalman, Ali Şakacı, Can Mavisu

8 June 2026	Bahçeşehir Koleji	71–73 (Series: 2–2)	Beşiktaş Gain	Istanbul
20:00 TRT (UTC+3)	Scoring by quarter: 16–20, 15–22, 20–17, 20–14
	Pts: Cavanaugh 14; Rebs: Williams 9 Asts: Flynn 6 PIR: Haltalı 22	Boxscore	Pts: Brown 16; Rebs: Brown, Morgan 5 Asts: Ugurlu 6 PIR: Brown 20	Arena: Sinan Erdem Dome; Attendance: 1,217; Referees: Emin Moğulkoç, Seher Ayşe Nur Yazıcıoğlu, Uğur Akyıldız

10 June 2026	Beşiktaş Gain	80–71 (Series: 3–2)	Bahçeşehir Koleji	Istanbul
20:00 TRT (UTC+3)	Scoring by quarter: 19−13, 16−26, 23−20, 22−12
	Pts: Dotson 26; Rebs: Arslan 7 Asts: Morgan 6 PIR: Dotson 26	Boxscore	Pts: Homesley 17; Rebs: Williams 12; Asts: Flynn 7 PIR: Williams 19	Arena: Akatlar Arena; Attendance: 2,600; Referees: Kerem Baki, Ziya Özorhon, Tolga Akkuşoğlu

== Finals ==
=== (1) Fenerbahçe Beko vs. (2) Beşiktaş Gain ===
13 June 2026	Fenerbahçe Beko	80–88 (Series: 0–1)	Beşiktaş Gain	Istanbul
20:00 TRT (UTC+3)	Scoring by quarter: 16–27, 26–16, 19–19, 19–26
	Pts: Biberović 16; Rebs: Melli 8 Asts: Baldwin IV 6 PIR: Biberović 16	Boxscore	Pts: Uğurlu 20; Rebs: Arslan 6 Asts: Dotson 8 PIR: Uğurlu 23	Arena: Ülker Sports Arena; Attendance: 10,054; Referees: Özlem Yalman, Altuğ Köselerli, Can Mavisu

15 June 2026	Fenerbahçe Beko	93–68 (Series: 1–1)	Beşiktaş Gain	Istanbul
20:00 TRT (UTC+3)	Scoring by quarter: 23–18, 27–19, 22–14, 21–17
	Pts: Baldwin IV 17; Rebs: Melli 10; Asts: Baldwin IV 5 PIR: Baldwin IV 25	Boxscore	Pts: Brown 17; Rebs: Brown 7 Asts: Uğurlu 6 PIR: Brown 21	Arena: Ülker Sports Arena; Attendance: 10,000; Referees: Emin Moğulkoç, Yener Yılmaz, Özge Şentürk Bayraktar

17 June 2026	Beşiktaş Gain	71–82 (Series: 1–2)	Fenerbahçe Beko	Istanbul
20:00 TRT (UTC+3)	Scoring by quarter: 23–19, 17–24, 18–21, 13–18
	Pts: Brown, Dotson 22; Rebs: Şanlı, Thomas 5 Asts: Brown 3 PIR: Brown 23	Boxscore	Pts: Melli 17; Rebs: Melli 13; Asts: Baldwin IV, Hall 4 PIR: Melli 24	Arena: Sinan Erdem Dome; Attendance: 17,000; Referees: Serdar Ünal, Mehmet Şahin, Ali Şakacı

19 June 2026	Beşiktaş Gain	75–77 (Series: 1–3)	Fenerbahçe Beko	Istanbul
20:00 TRT (UTC+3)	Scoring by quarter: 20–16, 25–24, 15–16, 15–21
	Pts: Arslan 19; Rebs: Brown 10; Asts: Dotson 4 PIR: Arslan, Şanlı 16	Boxscore	Pts: Baldwin IV 21; Rebs: Melli 11; Asts: Hall 6 PIR: Baldwin IV 25	Arena: Sinan Erdem Dome; Attendance: 12,017; Referees: Zafer Yılmaz, Ziya Özorhon, Hüseyin Çelik

2026 BSL Champions
Fenerbahçe Beko
13th Title
