= John Meeks (basketball) =

American basketball player (born 1999)

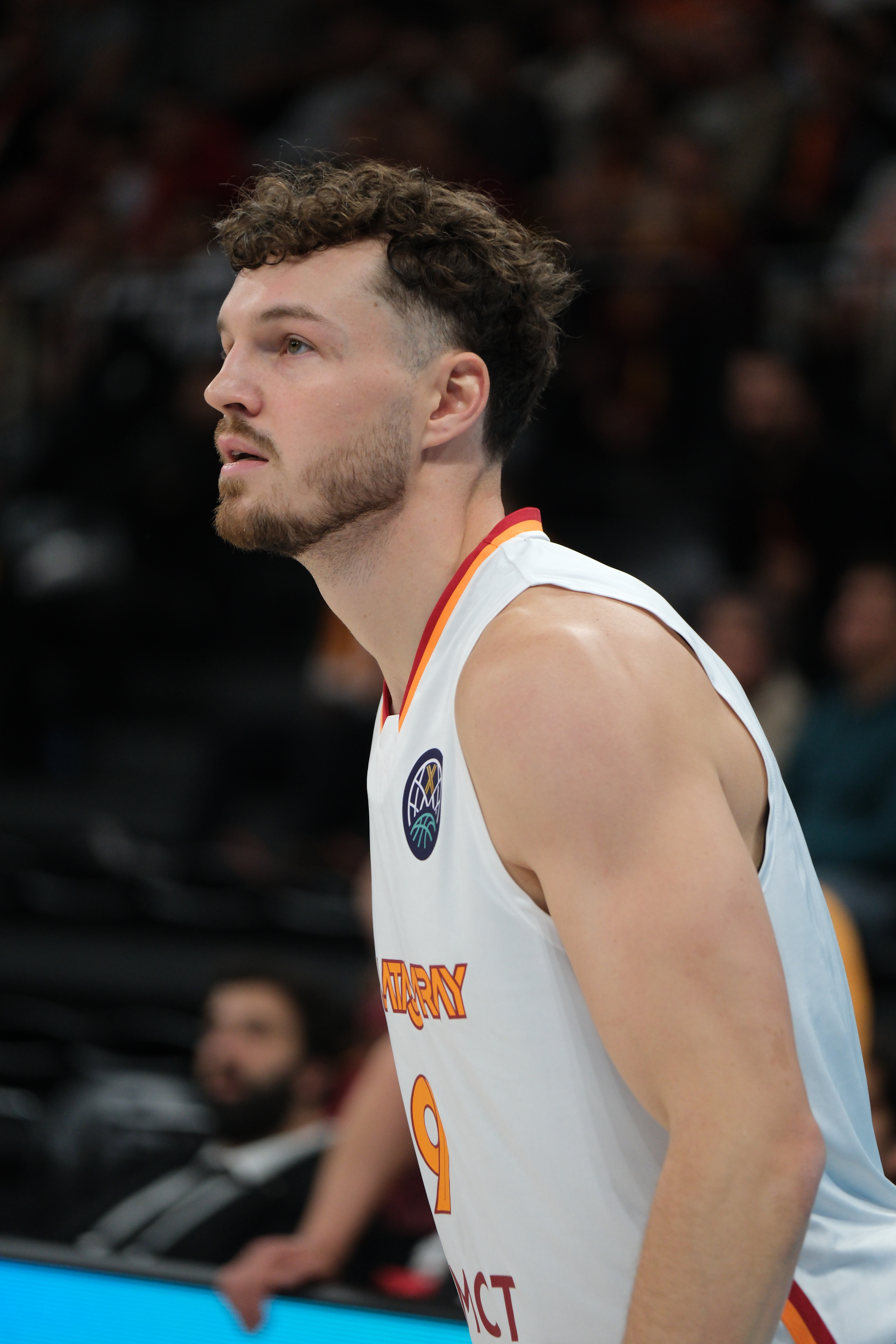
- Meeks with Galatasaray in 2025

No. 12 – Yukatel Denizli Basket
- Position: Forward
- League: Basketbol Süper Ligi

Personal information
- Born: March 16, 1999 (age 27) Winston-Salem, North Carolina, U.S.
- Listed height: 1.98 m (6 ft 6 in)
- Listed weight: 104 kg (229 lb)

Career information
- High school: The Burlington School (Burlington, North Carolina)
- College: Bucknell (2017–2021); College of Charleston (2021–2022)
- NBA draft: 2022: undrafted
- Playing career: 2022–present

Career history
- 2022–2023: Kouvot
- 2023–2024: Donar Groningen
- 2024: Santeros de Aguada
- 2024–2025: Bnei Herzliya
- 2025–2026: Galatasaray
- 2026–present: Denizli Basket

Career highlights
- Second-team All-CAA (2022)

John Robert Meeks (born March 16, 1999) is an American basketball player for Yukatel Denizli Basket of the Basketbol Süper Ligi (BSL). He played college basketball for the Bucknell Bison and the College of Charleston Cougars. A forward, Meeks then played for Kouvot in the Finnish Korisliiga, for Donar Groningen in the Netherlands, and for Santeros de Aguada in Puerto Rico.

== Early and personal life ==
Meeks is the son of Betsy and Cliff Meeks, and has two younger sisters. He was born in Winston-Salem, North Carolina, and lived in Burlington, North Carolina. He is 6 ft 6 in (198 cm), and weighs 224 pounds (102 kg).

== High school ==
Meeks played basketball for The Burlington School ('17) for four years at guard and forward, during which time the team had a 119–6 record and won two North Carolina Independent Schools Athletic Association Class 1-A state championships. He was twice named an all-state selection, and was a three-time all-conference selection, a two-time Times-News All-Region selection, and 2016-17 Player of the Year. As a junior, he averaged 16 points and seven rebounds per game. In his senior year, he averaged 18.2 points per game.

He also played baseball and competed in track & field for the school. Fifteen colleges made offers to Meeks out of high school.

== College ==
=== Bucknell ===
In 2017-18, Meeks played his freshman year at Bucknell University for the Bucknell Bison basketball team, and shot 52.2% from the field. Academically, he was a psychology major.

In 2018-19, he played his sophomore year at Bucknell, and shot 49.6% from the field, 48.5% from three-point range, and averaged 5.7 points per game.

In 2019-20, Meeks played his junior year at Bucknell, and shot 45.3% from the field and 34.9% from three point range, averaging 11.2 points and 5.3 rebounds per game (11th in the league). He was named Third Team All-Patriot League, and was named to the 2020 Patriot League Academic Honor Roll.

In 2020-21, he played his senior year at Bucknell, and shot 49.5% from the field, 38.5% from three point range, and 85.1% from the free throw line. Meeks led the NCAA in scoring with 25.3 points per game in his six games during the shortened COVID-19 season, and also averaged 6.8 rebounds per game. He was named Third Team All-Patriot League for the second straight year, and First Team All-Patriot Tournament, and National Association of Basketball Coaches (NABC) First Team All-Region.

=== College of Charleston ===
Meeks then attended the College of Charleston, studying for a masters in Communication. Playing for the Charleston Cougars basketball team in the Coastal Athletic Association (CAA), in 2021-22, he shot 46.8% from the field, and 79.3% from the free throw line. He averaged 14.1 points and 4.7 rebounds per game. He was named Second Team All-CAA, All-CAA Tournament, and NABC First Team All-Region.

== G-league ==
On Oct 22, 2022, the South Bay Lakers selected Meeks with Pick 17 of the second round in the 2022 NBA G League draft. On November 1, 2022, the team placed him on waivers.

== International leagues ==
=== Kouvot ===
In 2022–23, Meeks played for Kouvot in the Finnish Korisliiga. He shot 49.2% from the field, and 89.8% (10th in the league) from the free throw line. He averaged 18.3 points (6th in the league) and 6.0 rebounds per game.

=== Donar Groningen ===
In 2023-24 he played for Donar Groningen in the Netherlands. Meeks played primarily in the BNXT League, where he shot 54.4% from the floor and 43.0% from three point range (11th in the league), and averaged 18.1 points (2nd) and 6.3 rebounds per game.

=== Santeros de Aguada ===
That year Meeks also played for Santeros de Aguada of the Baloncesto Superior Nacional in Puerto Rico. He shot 55.5% from the floor and 46.6% from three point range, while averaging 22.5 points (2nd in the league) and 5.9 rebounds per game.

=== Bnei Herzliya ===
Beginning in 2024, Meeks has played for Bnei Herzliya Basket in the Israeli Basketball Premier League.

=== Galatasaray ===
On July 28, 2025, he signed with Galatasaray MCT Technic of the Turkish Basketbol Süper Ligi (BSL).

=== Denizli Basket ===
On August 28, 2026, he signed with Yukatel Denizli Basket of the Basketbol Süper Ligi (BSL).
