= Can Korkmaz =

Turkish basketball player (born 1992)

- Korkmaz with Galatasaray in 2026

No. 8 – Galatasaray
- Position: Point guard
- League: Basketbol Süper Ligi

Personal information
- Born: October 21, 1992 (age 34) Şişli, Istanbul, Turkey
- Listed height: 6 ft 2 in (1.88 m)
- Listed weight: 183 lb (83 kg)

Career information
- NBA draft: 2014: undrafted
- Playing career: 2010–present

Career history
- 2009–2011: Pertevniyal
- 2011–2012: Darüşşafaka Istanbul
- 2012–2013: Galatasaray
- 2013–2015: Trabzonspor
- 2015–2016: Uşak Sportif
- 2016–2017: Galatasaray
- 2017–2018: Sakarya BB
- 2018–2020: Galatasaray
- 2020–2021: Türk Telekom
- 2021–2022: Pınar Karşıyaka
- 2022–2024: Darüşşafaka
- 2024–present: Galatasaray

Career highlights
- Turkish Super League champion (2013)

Can Korkmaz (born October 21, 1992) is a Turkish professional basketball player for Galatasaray of the Basketbol Süper Ligi (BSL). He is a 1.88 m (6 ft 2 in) tall 83 kg (183 lb) point guard.

== Professional career ==
Korkmaz made his professional debut with Pertevniyal Istanbul, of the Turkish Second Division, during the 2009–10 season. He moved to the Turkish club Darussafaka Istanbul for the 2011–12 season. He then joined Galatasaray Istanbul. With Galatasaray, he won the Turkish Super League championship of the 2012–13 season. After that, he moved to Trabzonspor. He joined Uşak Sportif in 2015.

=== Galatasaray (2016–2017) ===
On July 25, 2016, Korkmaz returned to the Turkish Super League club Galatasaray for the 2016–17 season.

=== Sakarya BB (2017–2018) ===
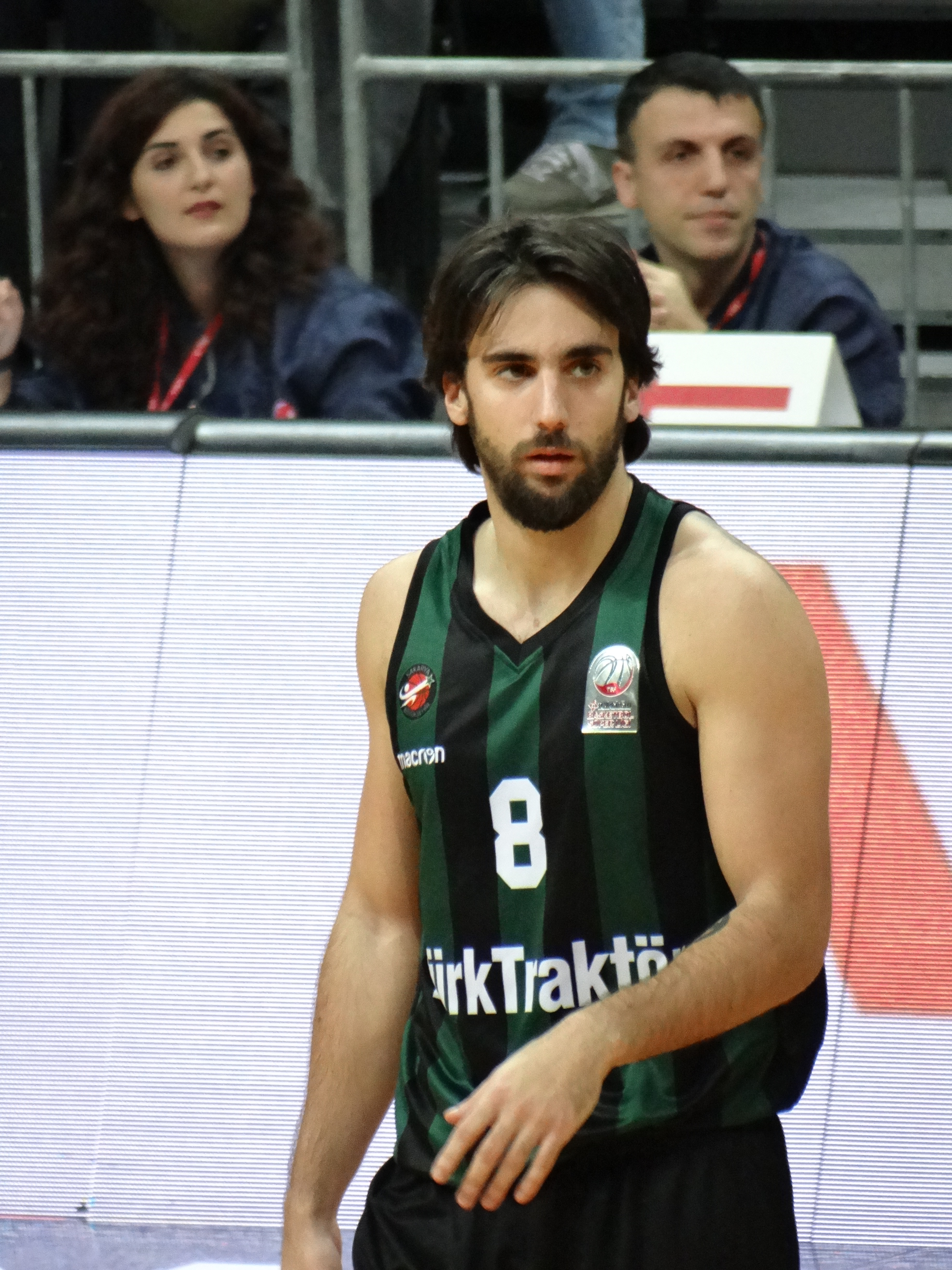
Korkmaz with Sakarya BB in 2018

On July 8, 2017, he signed with Sakarya BB.

=== Galatasaray (2018–2020) ===
On July 27 2018, he signed with Galatasaray

=== Türk Telekom (2020–2021) ===
On June 8, 2020, he signed with Türk Telekom of the Turkish Super League (BSL).

=== Pınar Karşıyaka (2021–2022) ===
On July 6, 2021, he signed with Pınar Karşıyaka of the Turkish Basketball League.

=== Darüşşafaka (2022–2024) ===
On June 7, 2022, he signed with Darüşşafaka of the Basketbol Süper Ligi (BSL).

=== Galatasaray (2024–) ===
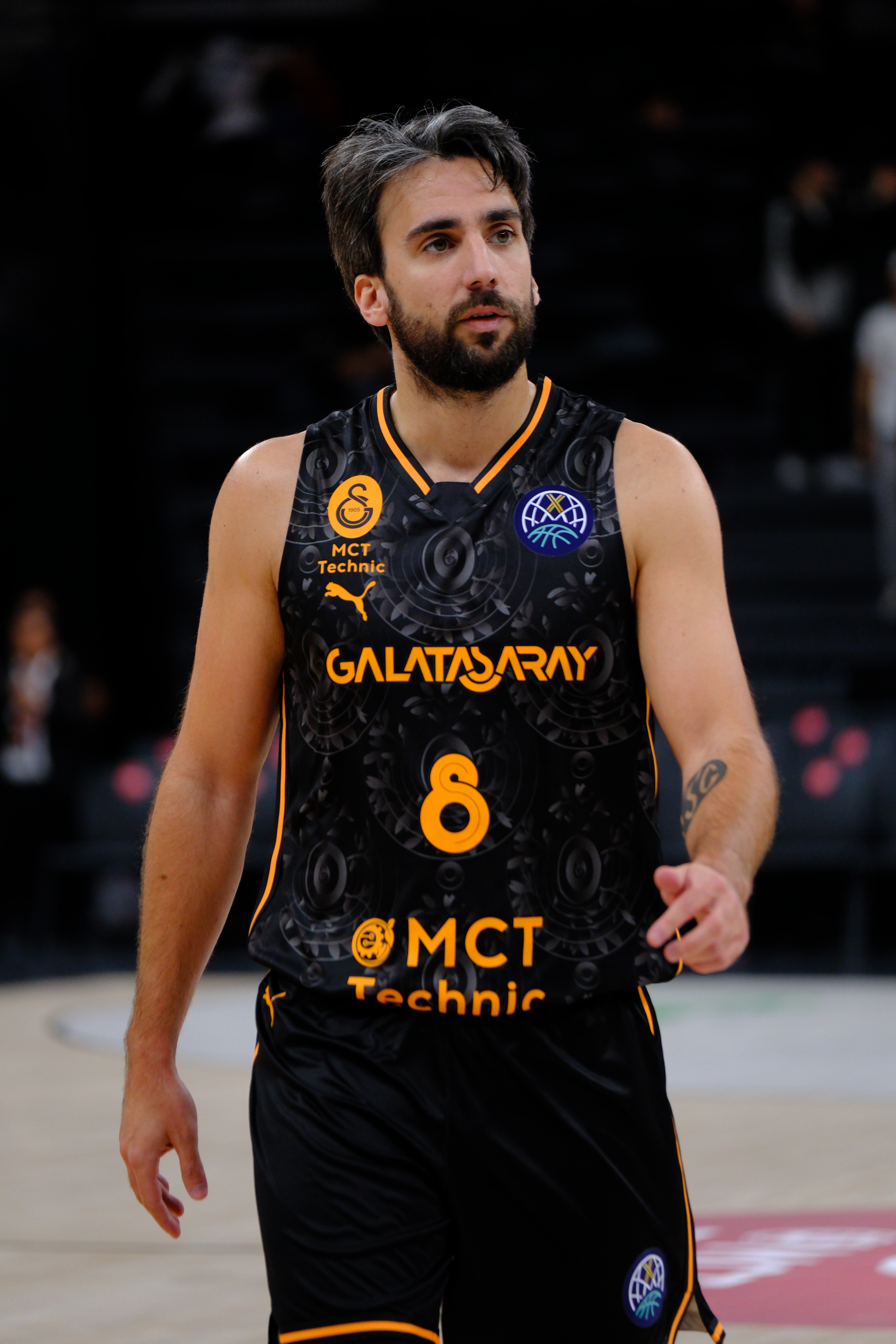
Korkmaz with Galatasaray in 2025

On September 27, 2024, he signed with Galatasaray of the Basketbol Süper Ligi (BSL).

== Turkish national team ==
Korkmaz was a member of the junior national teams of Turkey. With Turkey's junior national team, he played at the 2010 FIBA Europe Under-18 Championship.
