= Rıdvan Öncel =

Turkish basketball player (born 1997)

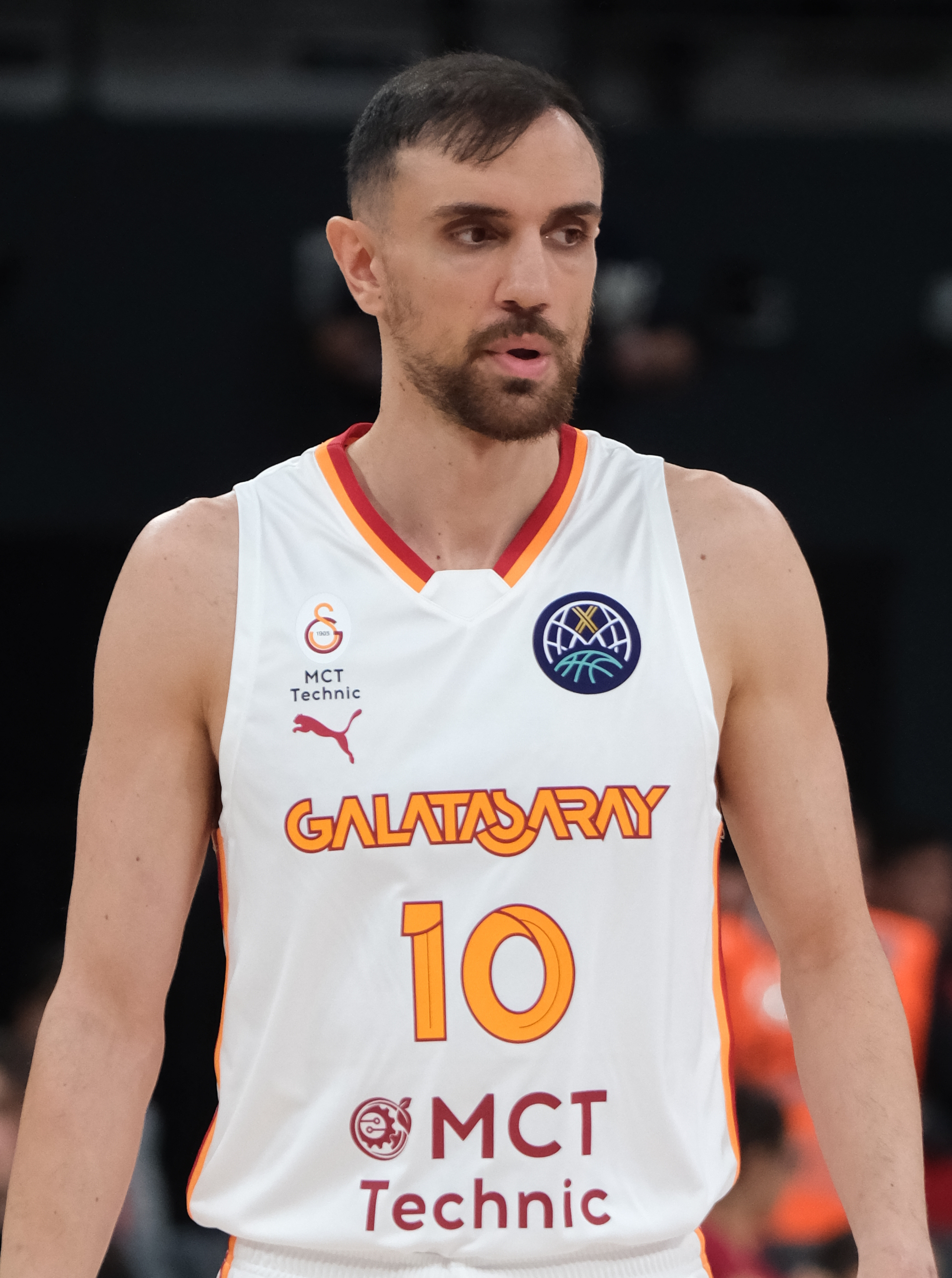
- Öncel with Galatasaray in 2025

No. 99 – Trabzonspor
- Position: Point guard
- League: Basketbol Süper Ligi; FIBA Champions League

Personal information
- Born: February 21, 1997 (age 29) Turkey
- Listed height: 6 ft 3 in (1.91 m)
- Listed weight: 194 lb (88 kg)

Career information
- Playing career: 2017–present

Career history
- 2017–2020: Bandırma
- 2020–2021: Bahçeşehir
- 2021–2022: Galatasaray
- 2022–2023: Türk Telekom
- 2023: Darüşşafaka
- 2023–2025: Anadolu Efes
- 2025–2026: Galatasaray
- 2026–present: Trabzonspor

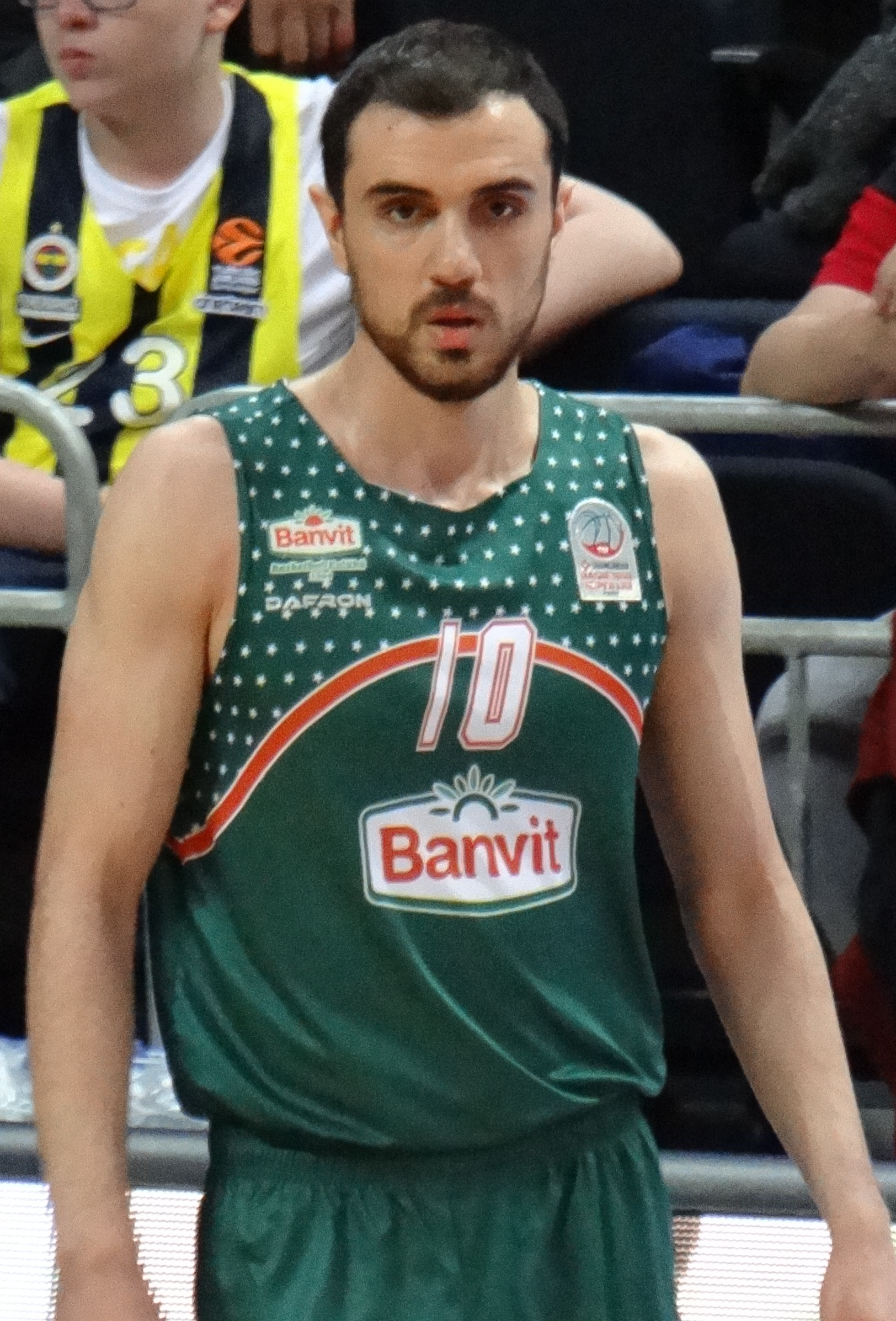

Rıdvan Öncel (born February 21, 1997) is a Turkish professional basketball player for Trabzonspor of the Turkish Basketbol Süper Ligi (BSL) and the FIBA Champions League. He plays at the point guard position.

== Career statistics ==
Legend
GP	Games played	GS	Games started	MPG	Minutes per game
FG%	Field-goal percentage	3P%	3-point field-goal percentage	FT%	Free-throw percentage
RPG	Rebounds per game	APG	Assists per game	SPG	Steals per game
BPG	Blocks per game	PPG	Points per game	PIR	Performance index rating
**Bold**	Career high

=== EuroLeague ===
Year	Team	GP	GS	MPG	FG%	3P%	FT%	RPG	APG	SPG	BPG	PPG	PIR
2023–24	Anadolu Efes	2	0	5.0	—	—	.500	—	.5	.5	—	1.0	0.0
Career		2	0	5.0	—	—	.500	—	.5	.5	—	1.0	0.0

=== EuroCup ===
Year	Team	GP	GS	MPG	FG%	3P%	FT%	RPG	APG	SPG	BPG	PPG	PIR
2020–21	Bahçeşehir Koleji	7	3	**12.9**	**.550**	.000	**1.000**	1.1	.6	**.4**	.**1**	**3.4**	**2.9**
2022–23	Türk Telekom	**21**	**19**	12.4	.500	**.333**	.750	**1.2**	**1.5**	.2	—	2.7	2.2
Career		28	22	12.5	.516	.273	.800	1.2	1.3	.3	.0	2.9	2.4

=== Basketball Champions League ===
Year	Team	GP	GS	MPG	FG%	3P%	FT%	RPG	APG	SPG	BPG	PPG
2017–18	Bandırma	11	**4**	15.9	.359	.273	.625	1.3	1.5	.4	—	3.7
2018–19	Bandırma	**15**	3	15.3	**.464**	.308	.808	**1.4**	1.3	.4	—	**5.9**
2019–20	Bandırma	**15**	3	15.8	.391	.357	.750	**1.4**	2.1	**.9**	**.1**	4.1
2021–22	Galatasaray	11	1	9.8	.333	**.429**	**1.000**	.7	.7	.3	—	1.9
2023–24	Darüşşafaka	5	**4**	**22.8**	.385	.250	.625	**1.4**	**3.4**	.4	—	5.4
Career		57	15	15.1	.404	.321	.758	1.2	1.6	.5	.0	4.2

=== Domestic leagues ===
Year	Team	League	GP	MPG	FG%	3P%	FT%	RPG	APG	SPG	BPG	PPG
2015–16	(Turkey) Bandırma Kırmızı	TBL	34	27.6	.462	.327	.726	2.7	2.8	1.2	.1	10.0
2016–17	(Turkey) Bandırma Kırmızı	TBL	33	24.7	.439	.180	.680	1.7	2.0	1.1	.1	8.9
2017–18	(Turkey) Banvit B.K.	TBSL	30	15.9	.583	.417	.574	1.4	1.8	.6	—	7.4
2018–19	(Turkey) Banvit B.K.	TBSL	29	20.1	.404	.327	.774	1.7	1.4	.6	.0	6.5
2019–20	(Turkey) Bandırma B.İ.K.	TBSL	20	21.5	.516	.326	.795	1.7	2.2	.9	.1	11.8
2020–21	(Turkey) Bahçeşehir Koleji	TBSL	15	10.3	.489	.278	.750	.9	1.2	.4	—	4.0
2021–22	(Turkey) Galatasaray	TBSL	32	10.2	.429	.333	.778	1.1	.9	.6	.0	2.9
2022–23	(Turkey) Türk Telekom	TBSL	37	16.4	.451	.286	.559	1.9	2.2	1.0	.1	5.6
2023–24	(Turkey) Darüşşafaka	TBSL	11	23.6	.376	.333	.703	3.4	2.7	.7	.2	9.0
2023–24	(Turkey) Anadolu Efes	TBSL	26	13.8	.419	.267	.813	1.9	1.9	.7	.1	4.7
