= James Palmer Jr. =

American basketball player (born 1996)

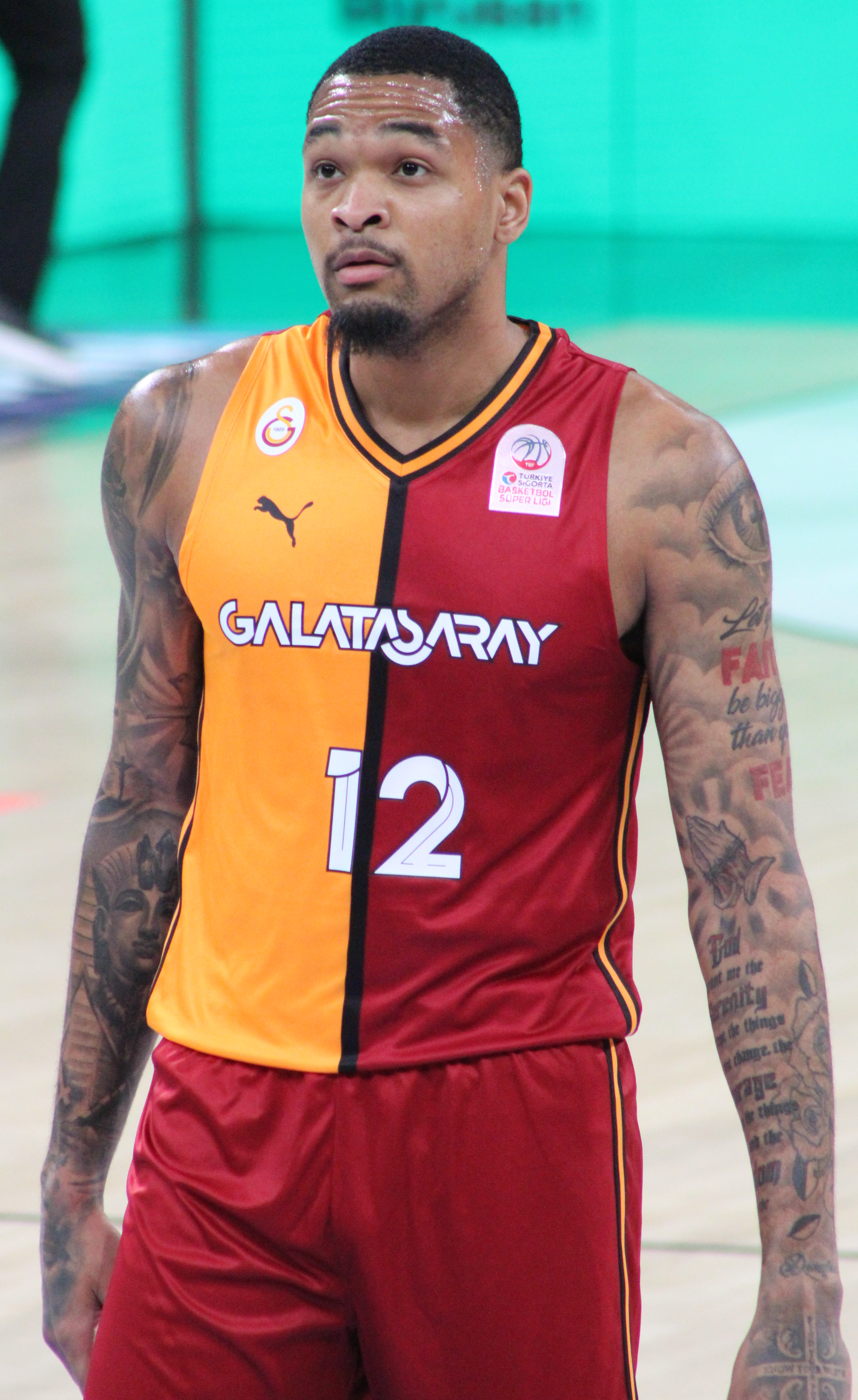
- Palmer with Galatasaray in 2024

No. 12 – Osaka Evessa
- Position: Shooting guard
- League: B.League

Personal information
- Born: July 31, 1996 (age 30) Washington, D.C., U.S.
- Listed height: 6 ft 5 in (1.96 m)
- Listed weight: 207 lb (94 kg)

Career information
- High school: Wise (Upper Marlboro, Maryland); St. John's College HS (Washington, D.C.)
- College: Miami (Florida) (2014–2016); Nebraska (2017–2019)
- NBA draft: 2019: undrafted
- Playing career: 2019–present

Career history
- 2019–2021: Agua Caliente Clippers
- 2021–2022: Stal Ostrów Wielkopolski
- 2022–2023: JL Bourg
- 2023–2024: Türk Telekom
- 2024–2026: Galatasaray
- 2026–present: Osaka Evessa

Career highlights
- All-FIBA Champions League First Team (2025); Polish Cup winner (2022); Third-team All-Big Ten (2019); First-team All-Big Ten – Coaches (2018)
- Stats at Basketball Reference

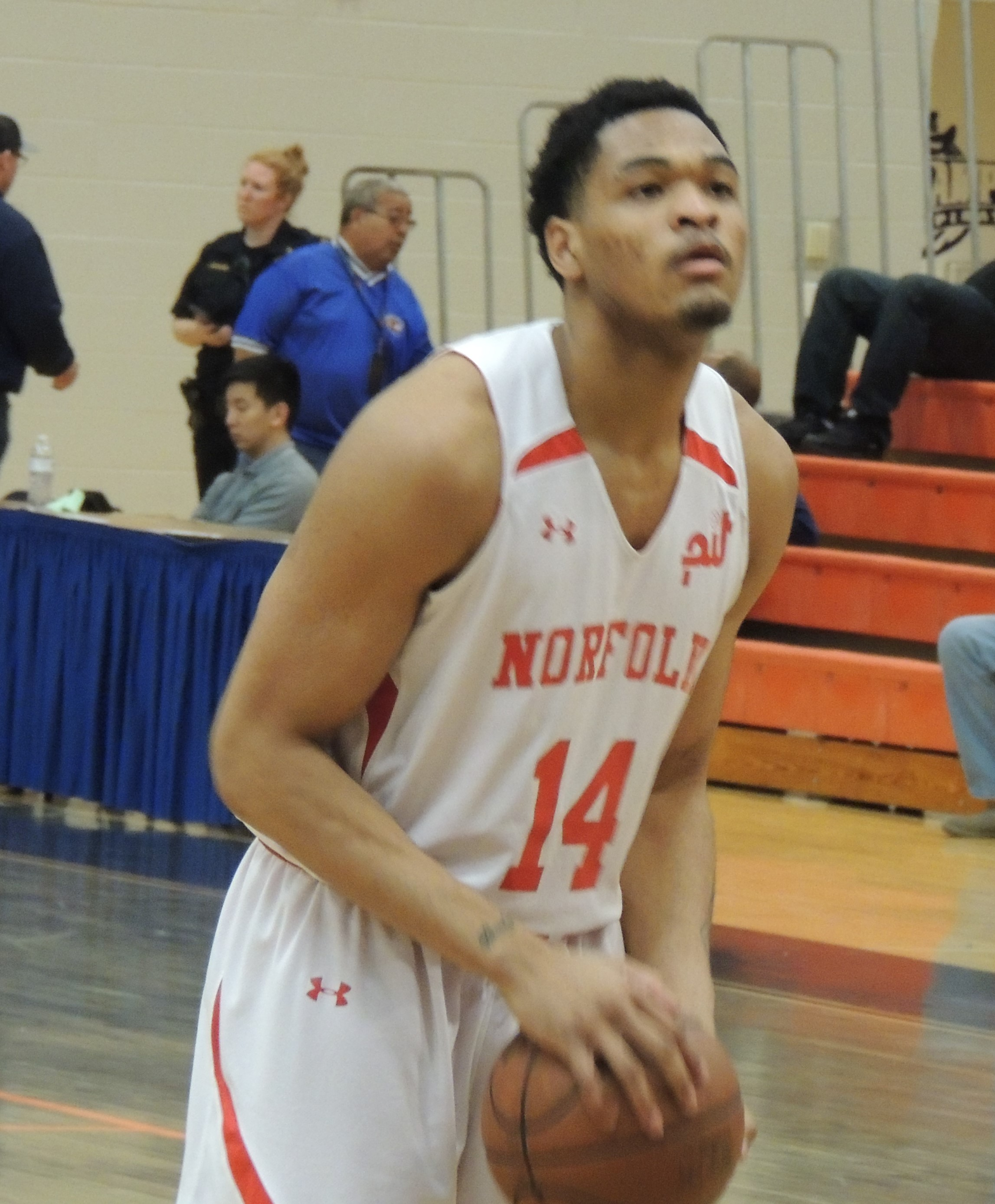
Palmer at the Portsmouth Invitational Tournament in April 2019

James Alfred Palmer Jr. (born July 31, 1996) is an American professional basketball player for Osaka Evessa of the B.League. He played college basketball for the Nebraska Cornhuskers.

== High school career ==
Palmer started his freshman year at St. John's College High School in Washington, D.C. After his freshman year, he transferred to Dr. Henry A. Wise High School in Upper Marlboro, Maryland. After attending his sophomore year at Wise HS he was recruited back to St. John's by new coach Sean McAloon, where he continued his junior and senior year. As a senior, he averaged 15.7 points, 3.0 rebounds, and 2.1 assists per game as he led his team to a 27–4 record and an appearance in D.C. State Athletic Association semifinal. For his efforts, he earned first-team all-conference in the highly-competitive Washington Catholic Athletic Conference. Palmer played summer ball for Team Takeover, one of the top AAU teams in the region.

=== Recruiting ===
Palmer was ranked in the top 100 players in the class of 2014 by both Scout and Rivals. He was ranked the number one player in the D.C. region by ESPN. Palmer committed to Miami on August 5, 2013.

College recruiting
Name	Hometown	School	Height	Weight	Commit date
James Palmer Jr. SG	Washington, D.C.	St. John's College High School	6 ft 5 in (1.96 m)	180 lb (82 kg)	Aug 5, 2013
James Palmer Jr. SG	Recruit ratings: Scout: Rivals: 247Sports: (79)				
Overall recruit ranking: Rivals: 99, 12 (SG) ESPN: (PG)
Note: In many cases, Scout, Rivals, 247Sports, On3, and ESPN may conflict in their listings of height and weight.; In these cases, the average was taken. ESPN grades are on a 100-point scale.; Sources: "2015 Nebraska Basketball Commitment List". Rivals.; "Men's Basketball Recruiting". Scout.; "ESPN - Miami Hurricanes Basketball Recruiting 2014". ESPN.; "Scout.com Team Recruiting Rankings". Scout.; "2015 Team Ranking". Rivals.

== College career ==
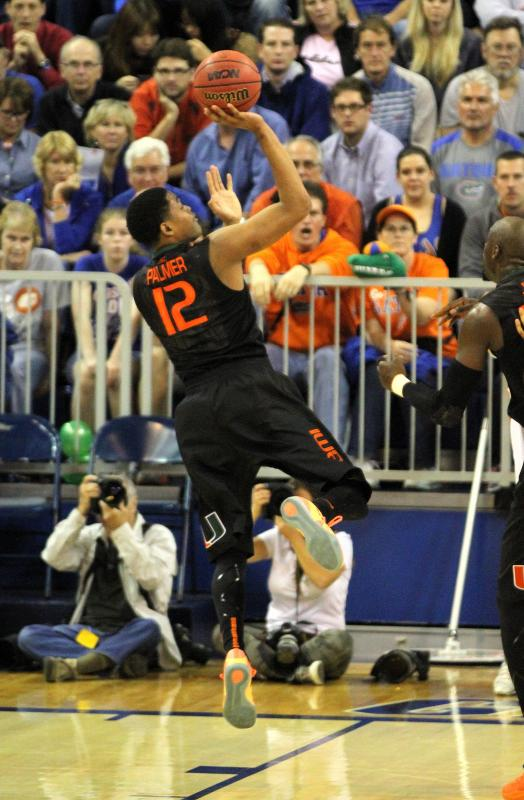
Palmer in 2014

=== Freshman ===
Palmer started five of 38 games played in the 2014–2015 season, averaging 3.7 points, 1.4 rebounds in 13.3 minutes per game.

=== Sophomore ===
Palmer played in 34 of 35 games in the 2015–2016 season, averaging 3.4 points, 1.1 rebounds, 0.7 assists and 0.4 steals in 11.6 minutes per game. In the Sweet Sixteen of the NCAA Tournament, he scored six points against eventual national champion Villanova.

On May 17, 2016, Palmer transferred to Nebraska.

=== Junior ===
After transferring from Miami, Palmer became the go-to scoring option at Nebraska and led the team to a 22-win season and NIT appearance. He averaged 17.2 points, 4.4 rebounds and 3.0 assists per game.

Following the season, Palmer declared for the 2018 NBA draft but did not hire an agent. On May 26, he announced he was returning to the Cornhuskers.

=== Senior ===
As a senior, Palmer averaged 19.7 points, 4.2 rebounds, 3.0 assists and 1.4 steals per game. He set school single-season records for points (708), free throws made (215) and minutes played (1,269). Palmer was named third-team All-Big Ten.

== Professional career ==
Palmer was not selected in the 2019 NBA draft but was signed by the Phoenix Suns for the 2019 NBA Summer League.

Palmer signed an Exhibit 10 training camp deal in August 2019 with the Los Angeles Clippers before being waived in October. This deal eventually resulted in him playing for the Agua Caliente Clippers for the 2019–20 NBA G League season. In his first game with the Clippers, Palmer scored 40 points on 15-of-19 shooting to go with five rebounds in a 121–120 win over the Northern Arizona Suns. He averaged 19.1 points, 2.7 assists, and 4.0 rebounds per game during the 2019–20 season. During the 2020–21 season, Palmer averaged 16.7 points, 4.8 rebounds and 2.8 assists per game.

On July 19, 2021, he signed with Stal Ostrów Wielkopolski of the Polish Basketball League for the entire season. On February 24, 2022, his NBA G League rights were traded from the Agua Caliente Clippers to the Cleveland Charge, in exchange for Trevon Scott.

=== JL Bourg ===
On June 29, 2022, he has signed with JL Bourg of the French LNB Pro A.

=== Türk Telekom ===
On June 26, 2023, he signed with Türk Telekom of the Turkish Basketbol Süper Ligi (BSL).

=== Galatasaray ===
On June 15, 2024, he signed with Galatasaray of the Basketbol Süper Ligi (BSL). He renewed his contract with the team on July 5, 2025, signing a new one-year deal.

== Career statistics ==
Legend
GP	Games played	GS	Games started	MPG	Minutes per game
FG%	Field goal percentage	3P%	3-point field goal percentage	FT%	Free throw percentage
RPG	Rebounds per game	APG	Assists per game	SPG	Steals per game
BPG	Blocks per game	PPG	Points per game	**Bold**	Career high

=== College ===
Year	Team	GP	GS	MPG	FG%	3P%	FT%	RPG	APG	SPG	BPG	PPG
2014–15	Miami	**38**	5	13.3	.413	**.365**	.652	1.4	.7	.1	.2	3.7
2015–16	Miami	34	0	11.6	.364	.277	.676	1.1	.7	.4	.1	3.4
2016–17	Nebraska	Redshirt										
2017–18	Nebraska	33	33	31.0	**.444**	.309	.738	**4.4**	**3.0**	1.0	**.5**	17.2
2018–19	Nebraska	36	**36**	**35.2**	.369	.313	**.762**	4.2	**3.0**	**1.4**	.4	**19.7**
Career		141	74	22.6	.398	.315	.742	2.7	1.8	.7	.3	10.9

== Personal life ==
Palmer was born in Washington, D.C., and is the son of Demetra McFadden and the late James Palmer Sr. His father died on May 29, 2009. Palmer has one sister, Tijisha, and one brother, Tijree.
