= Brynton Lemar =

American basketball player (born 1995)

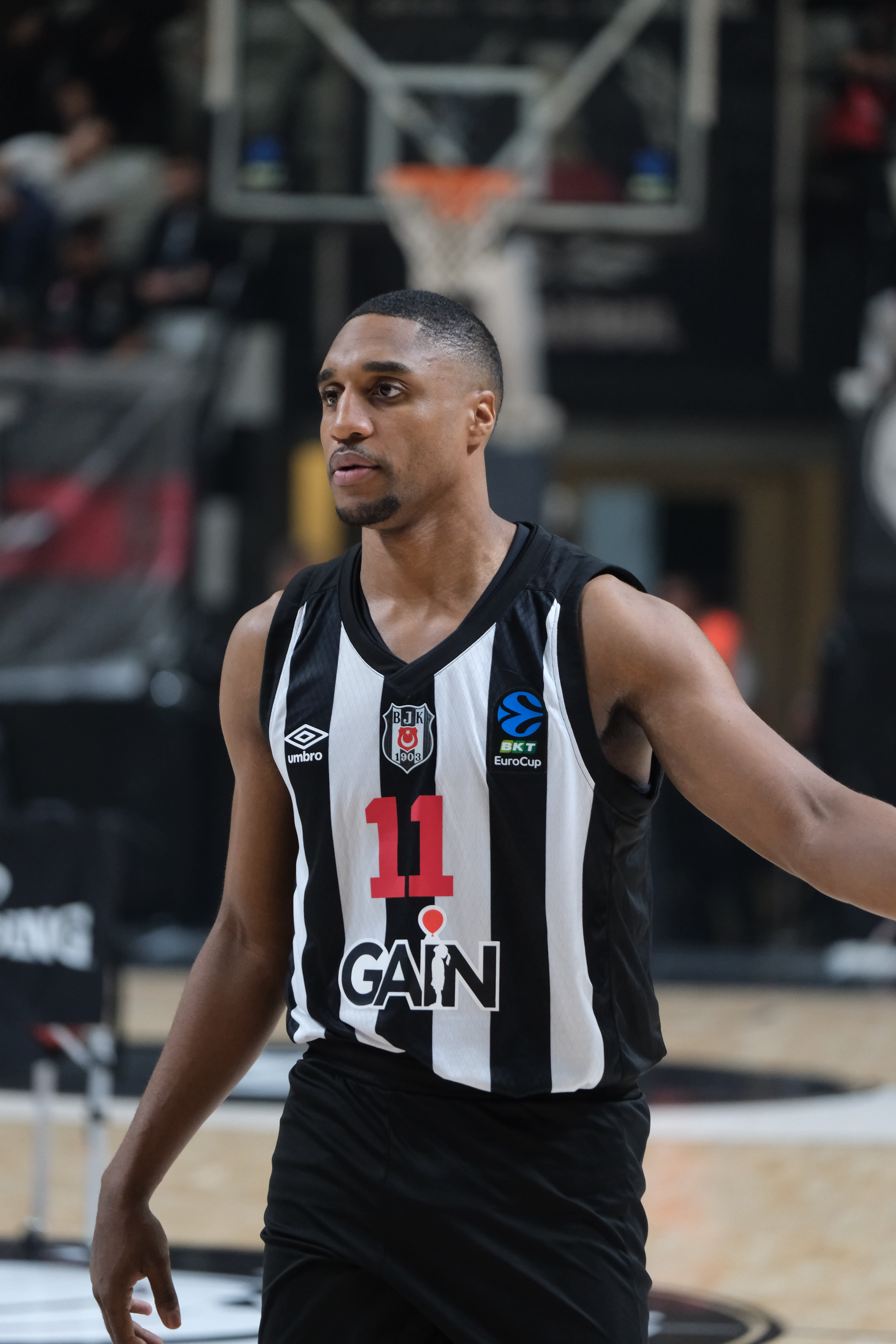
- Lemar with Beşiktaş in 2025

No. 11 – Maxima Roma
- Position: Shooting guard / point guard
- League: LBA; EuroCup

Personal information
- Born: January 23, 1995 (age 31) San Diego, California, U.S.
- Listed height: 1.93 m (6 ft 4 in)
- Listed weight: 88 kg (194 lb)

Career information
- High school: St. Augustine (San Diego, California)
- College: UC Davis (2013–2017)
- NBA draft: 2017: undrafted
- Playing career: 2017–present

Career history
- 2017–2018: SLUC Nancy
- 2018: Caen
- 2018–2019: Soproni
- 2019–2020: Start Lublin
- 2020–2021: Gaziantep
- 2021: Reggiana
- 2021–2022: Enisey
- 2022–2023: Le Mans
- 2023: AEK Athens
- 2023–2024: Hapoel Jerusalem
- 2024–2025: Cedevita Olimpija
- 2025–2026: Beşiktaş
- 2026–present: Maxima Roma

Career highlights
- Slovenian League champion (2025); Slovenian Cup winner (2025); First-team All-Big West (2017)

Brynton Jevon Lemar (born January 23, 1995) is an American-born Jamaican professional basketball player for Maxima Roma of the Italian Lega Basket Serie A (LBA) and the EuroCup. After playing four years of college basketball at UC Davis, Lemar entered the 2017 NBA draft, but was not selected in the draft's two rounds.

== High school career ==
Lemar attended St. Augustine High School, in San Diego, California. In his last season at Body of Christ, he averaged 21 points, 8.2 rebounds and 7.0 assists per game.

== College career ==
After high school, Lemar played college basketball at UC Davis, from 2013 to 2017. In his senior year at UC Davis, Lemar averaged 16.1 points and 3.3 rebounds per game. He was named to the Big West All-First Team.

== Professional career ==
After not being drafted in the 2017 NBA draft, Lemar signed with SLUC Nancy of the LNB Pro B. He finished the season with Caen.

On July 13, 2020, Lemar joined Gaziantep Basketbol. On February 14, 2021, he joined Reggiana of the LBA.

On August 2, 2021, he joined Enisey of the VTB United League. He left the team and joined Le Mans of the Pro A.

On February 23, 2023, Lemar joined AEK Athens, of the Greek Basket League, replacing Cameron McGriff on the team's squad.

On July 20, 2023, he signed with Hapoel Jerusalem of the Israeli Basketball Premier League.

On June 16, 2024, he signed with Cedevita Olimpija of the Slovenian Basketball League and ABA League.

On July 11, 2025, he signed with Beşiktaş of the Basketbol Süper Ligi.

On August 7, 2026, Lemar signed with Maxima Roma of the Italian Lega Basket Serie A (LBA).
