= Fabian White Jr. =

American basketball player (born 1998)

- White with Çayırova Belediyespor in 2026

No. 4 – Çayırova Belediyespor
- Position: Power forward
- League: Basketbol Süper Ligi

Personal information
- Born: November 29, 1998 (age 27) Houston, Texas, U.S.
- Listed height: 6 ft 8 in (2.03 m)
- Listed weight: 230 lb (104 kg)

Career information
- High school: Kingwood (Houston, Texas); Atascocita (Atascocita, Texas)
- College: Houston (2017–2022)
- NBA draft: 2022: undrafted
- Playing career: 2022–present

Career history
- 2022–2023: South Bay Lakers
- 2023–2024: Metropolitans 92
- 2024–2025: Manisa Basket
- 2025: Al Ahli Tripoli
- 2025–2026: Galatasaray
- 2026–present: Çayırova Belediyespor

Career highlights
- BAL champion (2025); First-team All-AAC (2022); AAC All-Rookie team (2018); AAC tournament MVP (2022)
- Stats at NBA.com
- Stats at Basketball Reference

Fabian Christopher White Jr. (born November 29, 1998) is an American professional basketball player for Çayırova Belediyespor of the Basketbol Süper Ligi (BSL). He played college basketball for the Houston Cougars.

== High school career ==
White began his high school career at Kingwood High School in Houston, Texas. He arrived as a promising basketball player and was moved to varsity games from the junior varsity team. White transferred to Atascocita High School in Atascocita, Texas, after his freshman year. He was regarded for his dunking and rebounding abilities. White was recruited by Houston Cougars head coach Kelvin Sampson who frequented his high school games.

== College career ==
White became a key player for the Cougars when he joined the team in the 2017–18 season. He was selected to the American Athletic Conference (AAC) All-Rookie team in 2018. White had increased his scoring and rebounding averages for each of his first three seasons.

On May 27, 2020, it was announced that White would miss the 2020–21 season after he tore his anterior cruciate ligament (ACL) during a solo workout. He returned to the lineup in February 2021 and provided a boost to the team as they made the Final Four of the 2021 NCAA Division I men's basketball tournament.

White scored 20 points as he led the Cougars to victory in the 2022 AAC basketball tournament and was named most outstanding player of the tournament. He averaged 12.5 points per game during his senior season and was selected to the All-AAC first team. White concluded his Cougars career with a program-record 122 wins.

== Professional career ==
=== South Bay Lakers (2022–2023) ===
White worked out for eight National Basketball Association (NBA) teams before the 2022 NBA draft but went undrafted. On July 24, 2022, he signed with the Los Angeles Lakers. On September 25, 2022, White was waived by the Lakers. On November 3, 2022, White was named to the opening night roster for the South Bay Lakers. On June 29, 2023, the Cleveland Cavaliers announced that White would play for them in the NBA Summer League.

=== Metropolitans 92 (2023–2024) ===
On August 14, 2023, White signed with Metropolitans 92 of the French LNB Pro A.

=== Manisa Basket (2024–2025) ===
On July 30, 2024, he signed with Manisa Basket of the Basketbol Süper Ligi (BSL).

=== Al Ahli Tripoli (2025) ===
In May 2025, White joined Libyan champions Al Ahli Tripoli for the playoffs of the 2025 BAL season, his first experience in Africa's premier competition. On June 8, White Jr. recorded 34 points and 13 rebounds to help Al Ahli defeat Kriol Star in the quarterfinals. On June 14, they won their first-ever BAL championship after winning the final against Petro de Luanda, in which White contributed 18 points and nine rebounds.

=== Galatasaray (2025–2026) ===
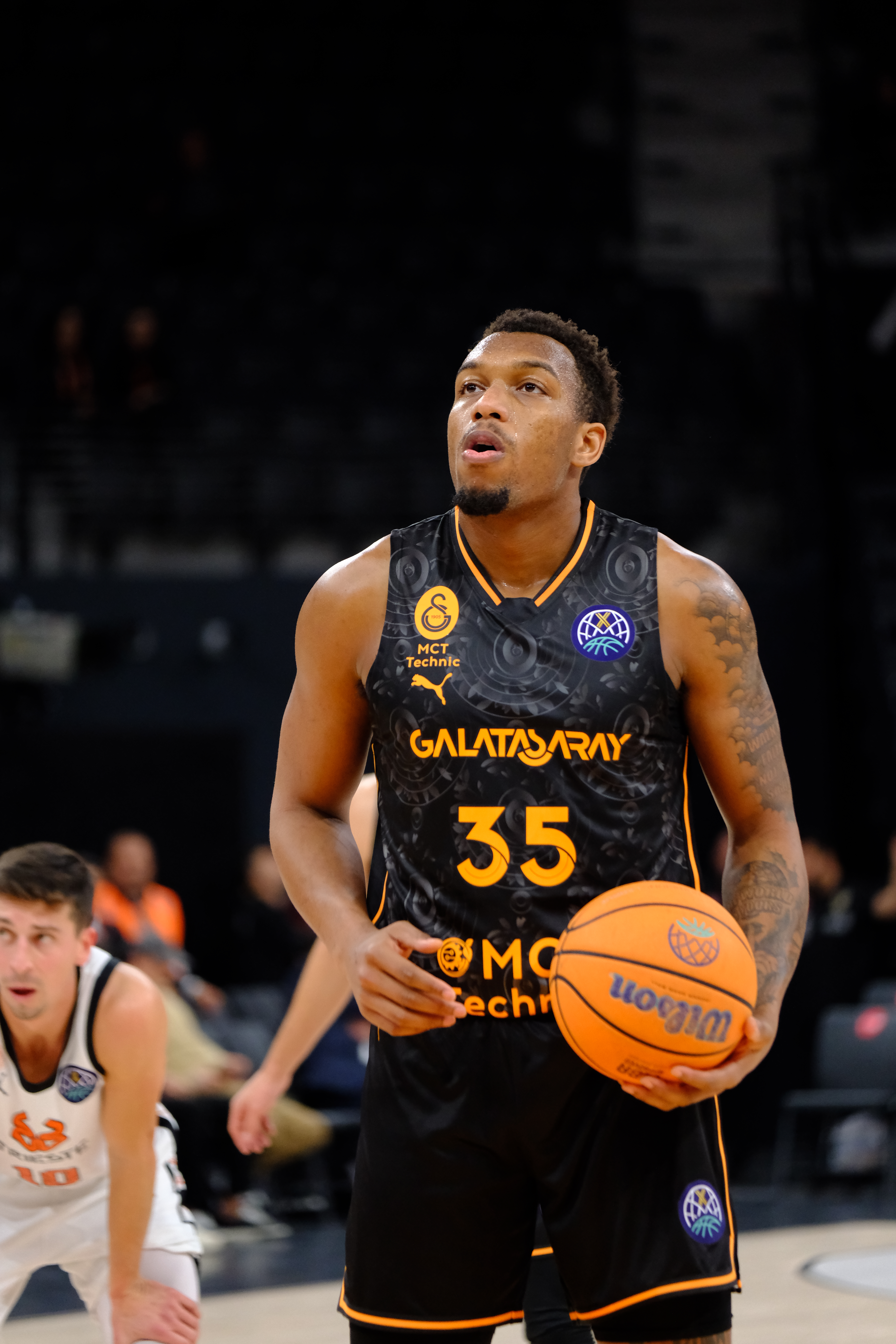
White prepares to shoot a free throw with Galatasaray MCT Technic in 2025

On July 6, 2025, he signed with Galatasaray MCT Technic of the Turkish Basketbol Süper Ligi (BSL).

=== Çayırova Belediyespor (2026–present) ===
On June 7, 2026, White signed with Çayırova Belediyespor of the Basketbol Süper Ligi.

== Career statistics ==
Legend
GP	Games played	GS	Games started	MPG	Minutes per game
FG%	Field goal percentage	3P%	3-point field goal percentage	FT%	Free throw percentage
RPG	Rebounds per game	APG	Assists per game	SPG	Steals per game
BPG	Blocks per game	PPG	Points per game	**Bold**	Career high

=== College ===
Year	Team	GP	GS	MPG	FG%	3P%	FT%	RPG	APG	SPG	BPG	PPG
2017–18	Houston	35	0	16.5	**.560**	–	.714	3.9	.7	.4	.9	5.4
2018–19	Houston	32	21	18.4	.457	.000	.672	4.0	.7	.4	.6	6.3
2019–20	Houston	31	31	23.7	.472	.000	**.797**	5.5	.8	.5	.5	9.3
2020–21	Houston	13	0	15.6	.508	**.400**	.700	4.1	.8	.4	.8	6.2
2021–22	Houston	**38**	**38**	**27.8**	.491	.371	.688	**5.7**	**1.2**	**1.0**	**1.4**	**12.5**
Career		149	90	21.2	.490	.364	.715	4.7	.9	.6	.9	8.3
