= Muhsin Yaşar =

Turkish basketball player

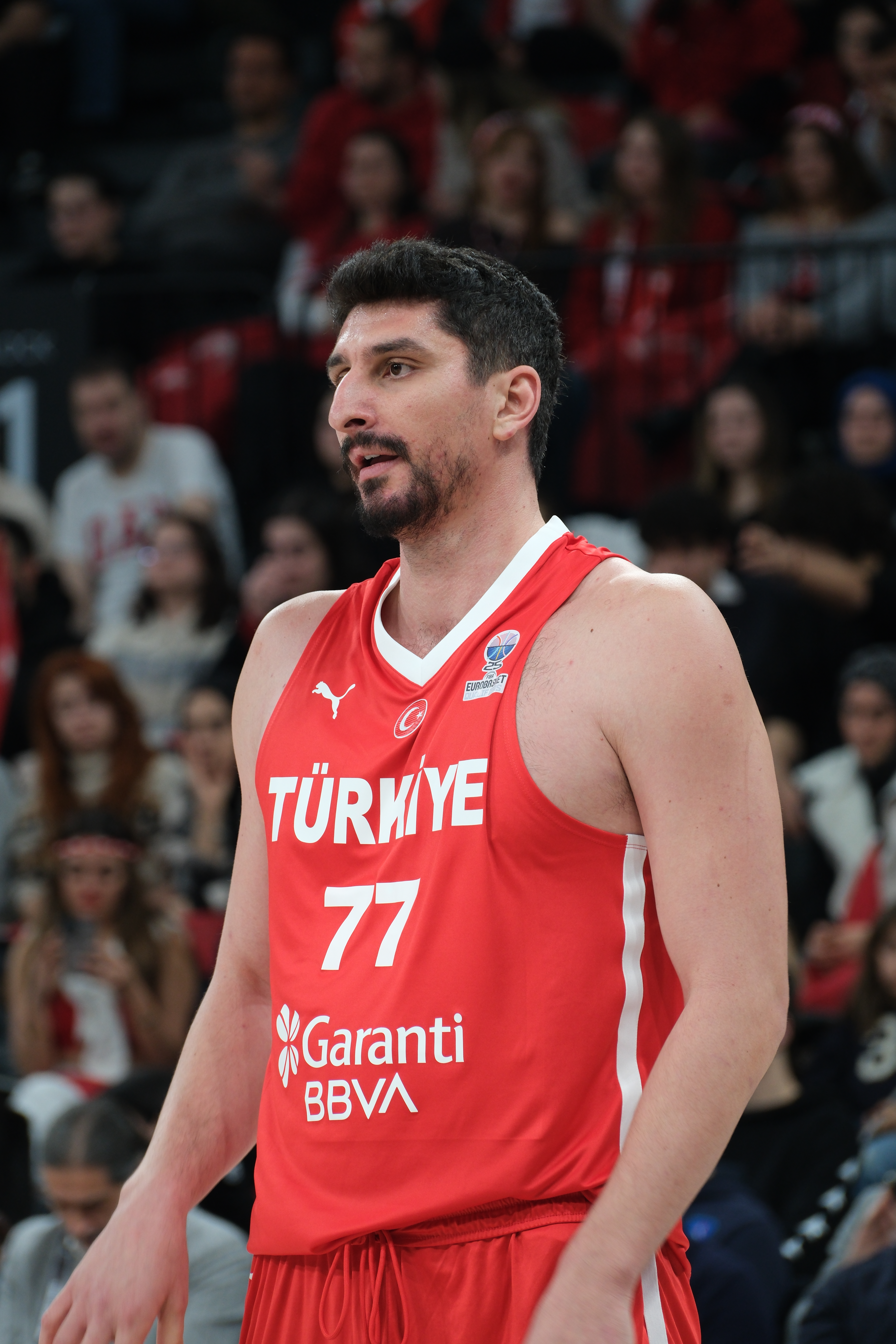
- Yaşar with the Turkish national team in 2025

No. 77 – Safiport Erokspor
- Position: Center
- League: Basketbol Süper Ligi

Personal information
- Born: December 31, 1995 (age 30) Yalova, Turkey
- Listed height: 6 ft 10 in (2.08 m)
- Listed weight: 212 lb (96 kg)

Career information
- Playing career: 2014–present

Career history
- 2014–2022: Tofaş
- 2022–2023: Gaziantep Basketbol
- 2023–2024: Darüşşafaka
- 2024–2025: Karşıyaka Basket
- 2025–2026: Galatasaray
- 2026–present: Esenler Erokspor

Muhsin Yaşar (born December 31, 1995) is a Turkish professional basketball player who plays as center for Esenler Erokspor of the Basketbol Süper Ligi (BSL). He represents Turkey in international tournaments.

== Professional career ==
=== Tofaş ===
Born in Yalova, Turkey, Yaşar started his career with Tofaş where he played until 2022. He averaged 9.4 points per game in 2019–20. On June 5, 2020, Tofas extended his contract for two seasons.

=== Gaziantep Basketbol ===
On July 21, 2022, he signed with Gaziantep Basketbol of the Basketbol Süper Ligi (BSL).

=== Darüşşafaka ===
On July 20, 2023, he signed with Darüşşafaka of the Basketbol Süper Ligi (BSL).

=== Karşıyaka Basket ===
On June 28, 2024, he signed with Karşıyaka Basket of the Basketbol Süper Ligi (BSL).

=== Galatasaray ===
On July 4, 2025, he signed with Galatasaray MCT Technic of the Turkish Basketbol Süper Ligi (BSL).

=== Esenler Erokspor ===
On June 17, 2026, he signed with Esenler Erokspor of the Basketbol Süper Ligi (BSL).
