= 2022–23 Galatasaray S.K. (men's basketball) season =

Galatasaray Nef
2022–23 season
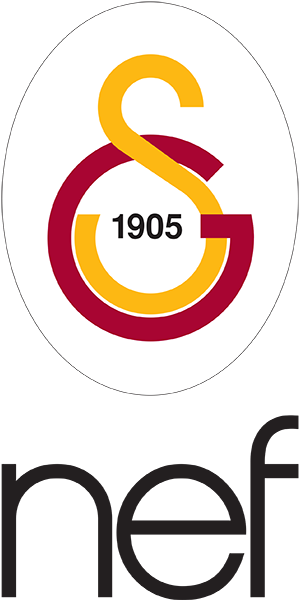
- President: Dursun Özbek
- Head coach: Andreas Pistiolis (until 9 May 2023); Zvezdan Mitrović (from 11 May 2023)
- Arena: Sinan Erdem Dome
- Basketbol Süper Ligi: 8th seed
- Playoffs: Quarterfinals
- Basketball Champions League: Round of 16
- Turkish Basketball Cup: Suspended

The 2022–23 season is Galatasaray's 111th season in the existence of the club. The team plays in the Basketball Super League and in the Basketball Champions League.

== Overview ==
=== July ===
- The regular season fixture of Galatasaray Nef, which will continue its European adventure in the FIBA Basketball Champions League this season, was announced on 13 July 2022.

=== August ===
- The fixture of the 2022–23 season of the Basketbol Süper Ligi was determined with the drawing of lots held on 30 August 2022 at Sinan Erdem Dome.

=== September ===
- In the statement made on 30 September 2022, as a result of the controls made by Jehyve Floyd, a fracture was detected in the metatarsal bone. The treatment process is expected to last between 4 and 6 weeks.

=== November ===
- On 26 November 2022, it was announced that the contract of Galatasaray Nef Head Coach Andreas Pistiolis was extended until the end of the 2024–25 basketball season.

=== January ===
- It was announced that Kerem Tunçeri, who assumed the post of General Director on 18 January 2023, resigned.

=== May ===
- On 9 May 2023, it was announced that the ways were parted with Andreas Pistiolis, who served as Head Coach.
- In the notification made on 11 May 2023, it was announced that an agreement was signed with Zvezdan Mitrović for the position of Head Coach of Galatasaray Nef, covering the years 2022–23 and 2023–24.

== Sponsorship and kit manufacturers ==
- Supplier: Umbro
- Name sponsor: Nef
- Main sponsor: Nef
- Back sponsor: —
- Short sponsor: Nef
- Socks sponsor: —

== Team ==
=== Squad information ===
Note: Flags indicate national team eligibility at FIBA-sanctioned events. Players may hold other non-FIBA nationalities not displayed.

Galatasaray roster
Players
Coaches

Pos.	No.	Nat.	Name	Ht.	Wt.	Age
SG	3	(United States)	McGee, Tyrus	1.88 m (6 ft 2 in)	93 kg (205 lb)	32 – 14 March 1991
PF	4	(Turkey)	İsmailçebi, Berke	2.04 m (6 ft 8 in)		18 – 7 June 2004
PG	5	(Turkey)	Karagülle, Sedat Ali	1.90 m (6 ft 3 in)		24 – 28 May 1999
PF	6	(Turkey)	Kabaca, Sadık Emir	2.08 m (6 ft 10 in)	95 kg (209 lb)	22 – 3 December 2000
C	8	(Turkey) (Germany)	Agva, Mahir	2.06 m (6 ft 9 in)	110 kg (243 lb)	26 – 26 June 1996
PF	12	(Turkey)	Vatan, Efe	2.07 m (6 ft 9 in)		19 – 13 April 2004
C	14	(Serbia)	Ristić, Dušan	2.13 m (7 ft 0 in)	112 kg (247 lb)	27 – 27 November 1995
F	22	(United States) (Italy)	Caloiaro, Angelo	2.03 m (6 ft 8 in)	102 kg (225 lb)	33 – 28 July 1989
PG	24	(United States)	Russell, Daron	1.80 m (5 ft 11 in)	75 kg (165 lb)	25 – 6 May 1998
PG	30	(Turkey)	Yıldızoğlu, Ege Tan	1.90 m (6 ft 3 in)	88 kg (194 lb)	19 – 1 January 2004
G	31	(Canada) (Jamaica)	Ennis, Dylan	1.88 m (6 ft 2 in)	102 kg (225 lb)	31 – 26 December 1991
G/F	44	(Turkey) (Sudan)	Mustafa, Muhaymin	2.01 m (6 ft 7 in)	91 kg (201 lb)	23 – 10 October 1999
G/F	61	(Turkey)	Köksal, Göksenin (C)	1.97 m (6 ft 6 in)	93 kg (205 lb)	32 – 8 January 1991

Head coach

- (Montenegro) Zvezdan Mitrović

Assistant coach(es)

- (Greece) Kostas Papadopoulos
- (Turkey) Gökhan Turan
- (Turkey) Cenk Alyüz

Athletic trainer(s)

- (Turkey) Bora Bölükbaşı

Physiotherapist(s)

- (Turkey) Ali Can Kaşlı
- (Turkey) Şahin Uğur Sezer

Team manager

- (Turkey) Turgay Zeytingöz
- (Turkey) İbrahim Tilki

Legend

- (C) Team captain
- Injured

- Roster
Updated: 15 April 2023

=== Depth chart ===
Pos.	Starting 5	Bench 1	Bench 2
C	Dušan Ristić	Mahir Agva	Efe Vatan
PF	Angelo Caloiaro	Sadık Kabaca	Berke İsmailçebi
SF	Muhaymin Mustafa	Göksenin Köksal
SG	Dylan Ennis	Tyrus McGee
PG	Daron Russell	Sedat Ali Karagülle	Ege Tan Yıldızoğlu

=== Transactions ===
==== In ====
No.	Pos.	Nat.	Name	Age	Moving from		Ends	Date	Source
25	C	(United States)	Jehyve Floyd	24	Fenerbahçe Beko	(Turkey)	June 2023	24 June 2022	
44	G/F	(Turkey)	Muhaymin Mustafa	22	Ionikos Nikaias	(Greece)	June 2023	25 June 2022	
8	C	(Germany)	Mahir Agva	26	Pınar Karşıyaka	(Turkey)	June 2024	26 June 2022	
9	PG	(Turkey)	Yunus Emre Sonsırma	29	Pınar Karşıyaka	(Turkey)	June 2024	27 June 2022	
2	F/C	(United States)	Raymar Morgan	33	ASVEL	(France)	June 2023	28 June 2022	
0	SF	(Turkey)	Sinan Sağlam	24	Petkim Spor	(Turkey)	June 2024	29 June 2022	
31	SG	(Canada)	Dylan Ennis	30	Gran Canaria	(Spain)	June 2023	13 July 2022	
22	PF	(United States)	Angelo Caloiaro	30	Maccabi Tel Aviv	(Israel)	June 2023	15 July 2022	
5	PG	(Turkey)	Sedat Ali Karagülle	23	OGM Ormanspor	(Turkey)	June 2023	20 July 2022	
11	SG	(Colombia)	Braian Angola	28	AEK Athens	(Greece)	June 2023	25 July 2022	
34	PF	(United States)	Ian Hummer	32	AEK Athens	(Greece)	June 2023	21 October 2022	
3	SG	(United States)	Tyrus McGee	31	Fujian Sturgeons	(China)	June 2023	8 November 2022	
14	C	(Serbia)	Dušan Ristić	27	Fuenlabrada	(Spain)	June 2023	28 December 2022	
24	PG	(United States)	Daron Russell	24	KK Mornar	(Morocco)	June 2023	21 January 2023	

==== Out ====
No.	Pos.	Nat.	Name	Age	Moving to		Date	Source
11	F/C	(Turkey)	Ege Arar	25	Petkim Spor	(Turkey)	11 June 2022	
9	PG	(Turkey)	Eray Erdoğan	22	Büyükçekmece Basketbol	(Turkey)	22 June 2022	
45	C	(United States)	David Kravish	29	Unicaja	(Spain)	23 June 2022	
12	SF	(Turkey)	Canberk Kuş	25	Darüşşafaka	(Turkey)	23 June 2022	
7	PG	(Turkey)	Rıdvan Öncel	25	Türk Telekom	(Turkey)	1 July 2022	
2	G	(United States)	Isaiah Canaan	31	Olympiacos	(Greece)	8 July 2022	
8	G	(Serbia)	Vasilije Pušica	26	FMP	(Serbia)	9 July 2022	
24	PF	(United States)	Kerry Blackshear	25	Hiroshima Dragonflies	(Japan)	12 July 2022	
3	PG	(United States)	Melo Trimble	27	Shanghai Sharks	(China)	18 July 2022	
13	SF	(Turkey)	Okben Ulubay	26	Beşiktaş Icrypex	(Turkey)	23 July 2022	
5	F/C	(Senegal)	Maurice Ndour	30	Nagoya Diamond Dolphins	(Japan)	25 July 2022	
44	SF	(United States)	DeVaughn Akoon-Purcell	29	Lokomotiv Kuban	(Russia)	28 August 2022	
2	C	(United States)	Raymar Morgan	34	Manisa Büyükşehir Belediyespor	(Turkey)	16 November 2022	
11	G/F	(Colombia)	Braian Angola	28	Pınar Karşıyaka	(Turkey)	16 November 2022	
0	SF	(Turkey)	Sinan Sağlam	24	AYOS Konyaspor	(Turkey)	23 December 2022	
1	PG	(Bulgaria)	Dee Bost	33	ASVEL	(France)	16 January 2023	
9	PG	(Turkey)	Yunus Emre Sonsırma	30	Bahçeşehir Koleji	(Turkey)	27 January 2023	
34	PF	(United States)	Ian Hummer	32	Peristeri	(Greece)	1 February 2023	
25	C	(United States)	Jehyve Floyd	25	Prometey	(Ukraine)	13 March 2023	

==== Out on loan ====
No.	Pos.	Nat.	Name	Age	Moving to		Date	Source
0	SG	(Turkey)	Acar Şen	19	Manisa BB	(Turkey)	29 August 2022	

== Club ==
=== Technical Staff ===
As of 20 May 2023

Name	Job
Zvezdan Mitrović	Head Coach
Kostas Papadopoulos	Assistant Coach
Gökhan Turan	Assistant Coach
Cenk Alyüz	Assistant Coach
Bora Bölükbaşı	Conditioning and Performance Coach
Sinan Üstündağ	Team Doctor
Ali Can Kaşlı	Physiotherapist
Şahin Uğur Sezer	Physiotherapist
Burak Kozan	Masseur
Adnan Güney	Material Manager

=== Administrative Staff ===
As of 14 March 2023

Name	Job
Turgay Zeytingöz	General Manager
İbrahim Tilki	Administrative Manager
Emir Akmanlı	Media and Communication Specialist
Beril Kefeli	Foreign Relations Officer
Vahit Yılmaz	Transportation

=== Staff changes ===
Change	Date	Staff member	Staff position	Ref.
Out	18 January 2023	(Turkey) Kerem Tunçeri	Managing Director	
Out	March 2023	(Turkey) Cenk Akyol	Assistant Coach	
Out	9 May 2023	(Greece) Andreas Pistiolis	Head Coach	
In	11 May 2023	(Montenegro) Zvezdan Mitrović	Head Coach	

== Pre-season and friendlies ==
=== Friendly match ===
28 August 2022 Friendly Match	Galatasaray Nef	72–63	Çağdaş Bodrumspor	Istanbul
18:00
	Pts: Ennis 18; Rebs: Agva 9 Asts: Ennis 4	Boxscore		Arena: Florya Metin Oktay Facilities

1 September 2022 Friendly Match	ONVO Büyükçekmece	87–80	Galatasaray Nef	Büyükçekmece, Istanbul
14:00
	Pts: Crawford 26; Rebs: three players 2 Asts: Mutaf 5	Boxscore	Pts: Ennis 20; Rebs: Morgan 8 Asts: four players 2	Arena: Gazanfer Bilge Sports Hall

5 September 2022 Friendly Match	Galatasaray Nef	90–52	Sigortam Net iLab	Ataköy, Istanbul
15:00
	Pts: Caloiaro 16; Rebs: Mustafa 6 Asts: Angola 8	Report 1 Report 2	Pts: Buckner 10; Rebs: Buckner 8 Asts: Hayes 4	Arena: Sinan Erdem Dome

7 September 2022 Friendly Match	Galatasaray Nef	77–80	Petkim Spor	Ataköy, Istanbul
18:00
	Pts: Angola 24; Rebs: Morgan 6 Asts: Ennis 7	Report 1 Report 2	Pts: Prewitt 31; Rebs: Prewitt, Yıldırım 5 Asts: Prewitt 5	Arena: Sinan Erdem Dome

11 September 2022 Friendly Match	Galatasaray Nef	60–56	Gaziantep Basketbol	Ataköy, Istanbul
13:00
	Pts: Ennis 17; Rebs: Caloiaro 9 Asts: Bost 3	Report 1 Report 2	Pts: Egbunu 11; Rebs: Egbunu 11; Asts: Batuk, Miller-McIntyre 2	Arena: Sinan Erdem Dome

15 September 2022 Cevat Soydaş Tournament 1	Tofaş	79–84	Galatasaray Nef	Nilüfer, Bursa
19:30
	Pts: Gray 20; Rebs: Büyüktuncel 8 Asts: Ennis 5	Report 1 Report 2	Pts: Ennis 20; Rebs: Ennis, Angola 7 Asts: Ennis 5	Arena: Tofaş Nilüfer Sports Hall

16 September 2022 Cevat Soydaş Tournament 2	Fenerbahçe Beko	72–75	Galatasaray Nef	Nilüfer, Bursa
19:30	Scoring by quarter: 6–17, 25–15, 23–16, 18–27
	Pts: Hayes 19; Rebs: Pierre 10; Asts: Edwards, Pierre 4	Report 1 Report 2	Pts: Morgan 24; Rebs: Angola 7 Asts: Ennis 5	Arena: Tofaş Nilüfer Sports Hall

21 September 2022 Frutti Extra Cup 1	Galatasaray Nef	78–76	Yukatel Merkezefendi Basket	Nilüfer, Bursa
15:15
		Report 1 Report 2		Arena: Barış Sports Hall

23 September 2022 Frutti Extra Cup 2	Galatasaray Nef	69–64	Petkim Spor	Nilüfer, Bursa
16:45
		Report 1 Report 2		Arena: Barış Sports Hall

24 September 2022 Frutti Extra Cup 3	Frutti Extra Bursaspor	74–64	Galatasaray Nef	Nilüfer, Bursa
20:00
		Boxscore		Arena: Barış Sports Hall

12 November 2022 Friendly Match	Galatasaray Nef	97–76	ONVO Büyükçekmece	Ataköy, Istanbul
19:00
		Report 1 Report 2		Arena: Sinan Erdem Dome

== Competitions ==
=== Overview ===
Competition	First match	Last match	Starting round	Final position	Record							
Competition	First match	Last match	Starting round	Final position	Pld	W	D	L	PF	PA	PD	Win %
Basketball Super League	2 October 2022	20 May 2023	Round 1	8th	30	14	0	16	2,422	2,441	−19	46.67
Basketball Super League Playoffs	26 May 2023	1 June 2023	Quarterfinals	Quarterfinals	3	1	0	2	248	256	−8	33.33
Basketball Champions League	5 October 2022	21 March 2023	Round 1	Round of 16	12	6	0	6	971	936	+35	50.00
Turkish Basketball Cup	15 February 2023		Quarterfinals		0	0	0	0	0	0	+0	—
Total					45	21	0	24	3,641	3,633	+8	46.67

Source: Competitions

=== Basketball Super League ===
==== League table ====
Pos	Team	Pld	W	L	PF	PA	PD	Pts	Qualification or relegation
6	Darüşşafaka Lassa	30	15	15	2487	2547	−60	45	Advance to playoffs
7	Tofaş	30	15	15	2487	2454	+33	45	Advance to playoffs
8	Galatasaray Nef	30	14	16	2422	2441	−19	44	Advance to playoffs
9	Bahçeşehir Koleji	30	13	17	2324	2384	−60	43	
10	ONVO Büyükçekmece	30	13	17	2394	2482	−88	43	

Source: Basketbol Süper Ligi

==== Results summary ====
Overall						Home					Away				
Pld	W	L	PF	PA	PD	W	L	PF	PA	PD	W	L	PF	PA	PD
30	14	16	2422	2441	−19	8	7	1250	1229	+21	6	9	1172	1212	−40

Last updated: May 20, 2022.
Source: bsl.org.tr

==== Results by round ====
Round	1	2	3	4	5	6	7	8	9	10	11	12	13	14	15	16	17	18	19	20	21	22	23	24	25	26	27	28	29	30
Ground	A	H	A	H	A	H	A	H	A	H	A	H	A	H	A	H	A	H	A	H	A	H	A	H	A	H	A	H	A	H
Result	L	L	W	L	L	W	W	L	W	W	W	W	L	L	L	L	L	L	L	W	W	W	L	W	L	L	L	W	W	W
Position	14	12	8	10	12	10	7	8	5	4	5	6	6	6	8	9	9	11	10	9	8	9	9	7	7	7	12	8	8	8

Updated to match(es) played on May 20, 2022. Source: TBF.org.tr
A = Away; H = Home; W = Win; L = Loss

==== Matches ====
Win Loss

Note: All times are TRT (UTC+3) as listed by the Turkish Basketball Federation.

2 October 2022 1	Anadolu Efes	77–68	Galatasaray Nef	Ataköy, Istanbul
13:00	Scoring by quarter: 15–9, 23–24, 13–19, 26–16
	Pts: Beaubois 21; Rebs: M'Baye 13; Asts: Bryant, Micić 5 PIR: Beaubois 25	Boxscore; Report	Pts: Kabaca 17; Rebs: Angola 9 Asts: Bost, Caloiaro 3 PIR: Angola 15	Arena: Sinan Erdem Dome; Referees: Ali Serkan Emlek, Ahmet Tatlıcı, Çağlar Özkan

8 October 2022 2	Galatasaray Nef	70–72	Pınar Karşıyaka	Ataköy, Istanbul
13:00	Scoring by quarter: 25–16, 17–24, 13–17, 15–15
	Pts: Ennis 18; Rebs: Ennis 9 Asts: Bost 5 PIR: Ennis 16	Boxscore; Report	Pts: McCollum, Kuzminskas 15; Rebs: Delgado 14; Asts: McCollum 9 PIR: Kuzminskas 19	Arena: Sinan Erdem Dome; Referees: Mehmet Şahin, Can Mavisu, Berk Kurtulmuş

17 October 2022 3	Petkim Spor	66–84	Galatasaray Nef	Aliağa, İzmir
19:00	Scoring by quarter: 22–16, 19–24, 13–23, 12–21
	Pts: Simmons 22; Rebs: Aldridge 9 Asts: Melson 6 PIR: Simmons 29	Boxscore; Report	Pts: Caloiaro 18; Rebs: Caloiaro 7 Asts: Bost 5 PIR: Caloiaro 22	Arena: Enka Sport Hall; Referees: Hüseyin Çelik, Ali Şakacı, İsmail Binbir

22 October 2022 4	Galatasaray Nef	67–74	Beşiktaş Emlakjet	Ataköy, Istanbul
18:00	Scoring by quarter: 16–21, 27–17, 3–13, 21–23
	Pts: Bost 16; Rebs: Caloiaro 10; Asts: Ennis 4 PIR: Caloiaro 14	Boxscore; Report	Pts: Usher 17; Rebs: McCormack 16; Asts: Orelik 6 PIR: McCormack 24	Arena: Sinan Erdem Dome; Referees: Erşan Kartal, Ziya Özorhon, Tolga Edis

30 October 2022 5	Darüşşafaka	68–66	Galatasaray Nef	Istanbul
15:30	Scoring by quarter: 16–13, 15–20, 15–23, 22–10
	Pts: McCullough 13; Rebs: Olaseni 12; Asts: Özdemiroğlu 6 PIR: Olaseni 24	Boxscore; Report	Pts: Caloiaro 12; Rebs: Caloiaro 5 Asts: Ennis 5 PIR: Caloiaro 20	Arena: Ayhan Şahenk Sports Hall; Referees: Yener Yılmaz, Sinem Tetik, Musa Kazım Çetin

4 November 2022 6	Galatasaray Nef	90–76	Tofaş	Ataköy, Istanbul
19:00	Scoring by quarter: 24–12, 18–20, 26–26, 22–18
	Pts: Ennis 23; Rebs: Caloiaro 9 Asts: Bost 8 PIR: Ennis 27	Boxscore; Report	Pts: Toure 21; Rebs: Toure 9 Asts: Gray 6 PIR: Toure 27	Arena: Sinan Erdem Dome; Referees: Emin Moğulkoç, Aytuğ Ekti, Alper Özgök

19 November 2022 7	Frutti Extra Bursaspor	88–93	Galatasaray Nef	Bursa
20:30	Scoring by quarter: 23–29, 22–21, 20–24, 23–19
	Pts: Bitim 18; Rebs: Dudzinski 9 Asts: Needham 7 PIR: Dudzinski 21	Boxscore; Report	Pts: McGee 18; Rebs: Köksal 7 Asts: Bost 5 PIR: Caloiaro 20	Arena: Tofaş Nilüfer Sports Hall; Referees: Zafer Yılmaz, Mehmet Serdar Ünal, Semih Vural

27 November 2022 8	Galatasaray Nef	91–97	Fenerbahçe Beko	Ataköy, Istanbul
20:30	Scoring by quarter: 23–31, 28–15, 19–26, 21–25
	Pts: Ennis 27; Rebs: Caloiaro 6 Asts: Bost 7 PIR: Bost 28	Boxscore; Report	Pts: Wilbekin 22; Rebs: Birsen 8 Asts: Calathes 11; PIR: Hayes 25	Arena: Sinan Erdem Dome; Referees: Ali Serkan Emlek, Mehmet Karabilecen, Burak Yılmaz

3 December 2022 9	Bahçeşehir Koleji	79–86	Galatasaray Nef	Istanbul
20:30	Scoring by quarter: 17–24, 23–18, 13–24, 26–20
	Pts: Shepherd 19; Rebs: Boutsiele 10; Asts: Arslan 4 PIR: Boutsiele 22	Boxscore; Report	Pts: Caloiaro 19; Rebs: Ennis 7 Asts: Bost 7 PIR: Caloiaro 27	Arena: Ülker Sports and Event Hall; Referees: Altuğ Köselerli, Serhat Büker, Polat Parlak

11 December 2022 10	Galatasaray Nef	77–54	Gaziantep Basketbol	Ataköy, Istanbul
13:00	Scoring by quarter: 9–14, 34–15, 19–14, 15–11
	Pts: Kabaca 17; Rebs: Caloiaro, Ennis 6 Asts: Bost 8 PIR: Kabaca 19	Boxscore; Report	Pts: Miller-McIntyre 12; Rebs: Hammonds 8 Asts: Dotson 3 PIR: Hammonds 13	Arena: Sinan Erdem Dome; Referees: Kerem Baki, Orhan Çağrı Hekimoğlu, Erhan Gürsel

17 December 2022 11	ONVO Büyükçekmece	63–67	Galatasaray Nef	Büyükçekmece, Istanbul
18:00	Scoring by quarter: 15–21, 16–13, 21–14, 11–19
	Pts: Crawford 17; Rebs: Weber 9 Asts: Weber 6 PIR: Weber 29	Boxscore; Report	Pts: Caloiaro 16; Rebs: Kabaca 13; Asts: Caloiaro 3 PIR: Kabaca 19	Arena: Gazanfer Bilge Sports Hall; Referees: Emin Moğulkoç, Ahmet Tatlıcı, Murat Ciner

24 December 2022 12	Galatasaray Nef	106–100(OT)	Türk Telekom	Ataköy, Istanbul
15:30	Scoring by quarter: 24–22, 27–15, 20–24, 16–26, Overtime: 19–13
	Pts: Ennis 25; Rebs: Ennis 10; Asts: Ennis 9 PIR: Ennis 38	Boxscore; Report	Pts: Taylor, Grant 23; Rebs: Jones 12; Asts: Grant 8 PIR: Grant 27	Arena: Sinan Erdem Dome; Referees: Fatih Arslanoğlu, Hüseyin Çelik, Tolga Edis

31 December 2022 13	AYOS Konyaspor	76–73	Galatasaray Nef	Konya
13:00	Scoring by quarter: 19–23, 17–19, 15–11, 25–20
	Pts: Morgan 26; Rebs: Eddie 9 Asts: Pérez 7 PIR: Morgan 26	Boxscore; Report	Pts: McGee 23; Rebs: Caloiaro 26; Asts: Bost 8 PIR: McGee 21	Arena: Selçuklu Municipality Sports Hall; Referees: Can Mavisu, Seher Ayşe Nur Yazıcıoğlu, Çağlar Özkan

9 January 2023 14	Galatasaray Nef	83–100	Yukatel Merkezefendi Basket	Ataköy, Istanbul
19:00	Scoring by quarter: 20–26, 22–22, 14–24, 27–28
	Pts: Caloiaro 20; Rebs: Caloiaro 7 Asts: Bost 7 PIR: Caloiaro 26	Boxscore; Report	Pts: Heidegger 27; Rebs: Hamilton 13; Asts: Heidegger 8 PIR: Heidegger 32	Arena: Sinan Erdem Dome; Referees: Ali Serkan Emlek, Orhan Çağrı Hekimoğlu, Umut Özgün Ergün

15 January 2023 15	Manisa Büyükşehir Belediyespor	85–72	Galatasaray Nef	Manisa
13:00	Scoring by quarter: 21–8, 26–22, 11–24, 27–18
	Pts: Tarrant 24; Rebs: Anosike 12; Asts: Tarrant 6 PIR: Tarrant 29	Boxscore; Report	Pts: Caloiaro 24; Rebs: Caloiaro 8 Asts: Sonsırma 7 PIR: Caloiaro 27	Arena: Muradiye Sports Hall; Referees: Yener Yılmaz, Mehmet Serdar Ünal, Musa Kazım Çetin

22 January 2023 16	Galatasaray Nef	70–80	Anadolu Efes	Ataköy, Istanbul
20:30	Scoring by quarter: 19–17, 21–22, 17–18, 13–23
	Pts: Ennis 22; Rebs: Caloiaro 9 Asts: McGee 6 PIR: Ennis 22	Boxscore; Report	Pts: Larkin 19; Rebs: Clyburn 10; Asts: Larkin 8 PIR: Larkin 31	Arena: Sinan Erdem Dome; Referees: Zafer Yılmaz, Ziya Özorhon, Yiğit Gönültaş

28 January 2023 17	Pınar Karşıyaka	103–91	Galatasaray Nef	İzmir
18:00	Scoring by quarter: 28–19, 27–24, 21–25, 27–23
	Pts: Angola, McCollum 21; Rebs: Delgado 7 Asts: J.Brown 8 PIR: Angola 32	Boxscore; Report	Pts: Russell 22; Rebs: Ristić 6 Asts: Russell 7 PIR: Russell 27	Arena: Karşıyaka Arena; Referees: Aytuğ Ekti, Fatih Arslanoğlu, Burak Yılmaz

4 February 2023 18	Galatasaray Nef	74–82	Petkim Spor	Ataköy, Istanbul
18:00	Scoring by quarter: 19–23, 18–17, 20–20, 17–22
	Pts: Caloiaro 16; Rebs: three player 5 Asts: Russell 8 PIR: Caloiaro 22	Boxscore; Report	Pts: Prewitt 26; Rebs: Prewitt 7 Asts: Chery 4 PIR: Prewitt 27	Arena: Sinan Erdem Dome; Referees: Özlem Yalman, Kaan Büyükçil, Batuhan Söylemezoğlu

4 March 2023 19	Beşiktaş Emlakjet	85–78	Galatasaray Nef	Istanbul
20:30	Scoring by quarter: 19–17, 15–20, 33–20, 18–21
	Pts: Freeman 18; Rebs: three player 6 Asts: Jackson-Cartwright 8 PIR: Jackson-Cartwright 19	Boxscore; Report	Pts: Ennis 21; Rebs: Caloiaro 11; Asts: Russell 4 PIR: Ennis 18	Arena: Akatlar Arena; Referees: Emin Moğulkoç, Seher Ayşe Nur Yazıcıoğlu, Göksun Öz
Note: Originally scheduled to be played on 11 February 2023. Postponed due to the 2023 Turkey–Syria earthquakes.

12 March 2023 20	Galatasaray Nef	71–65	Darüşşafaka	Ataköy, Istanbul
15:30	Scoring by quarter: 4–19, 23–13, 20–16, 24–17
	Pts: Ennis 21; Rebs: Ennis, Ristić 9 Asts: Ennis, Russell 3 PIR: Ristić 23	Boxscore; Report	Pts: Starks 19; Rebs: Özdemiroğlu 10; Asts: Özdemiroğlu 8 PIR: Starks 19	Arena: Sinan Erdem Dome; Referees: Mehmet Karabilecen, Mehmet Serdar Ünal, Polat Parlak

18 March 2023 21	Tofaş	81–83	Galatasaray Nef	Bursa
18:00	Scoring by quarter: 23–27, 22–11, 7–30, 29–15
	Pts: Ennis 18; Rebs: Toure 10; Asts: Ennis 7 PIR: Ennis 24	Boxscore; Report	Pts: McGee 26; Rebs: Ristić 9 Asts: Russell 9 PIR: McGee 22	Arena: Tofaş Nilüfer Sports Hall; Referees: Can Mavisu, Ali Şakacı, Çağlar Özkan

25 March 2023 22	Galatasaray Nef	91–80	Frutti Extra Bursaspor	Ataköy, Istanbul
20:30	Scoring by quarter: 18–20, 32–15, 19–17, 22–28
	Pts: Russell 26; Rebs: Agva 8 Asts: Ennis 6 PIR: Russell 24	Boxscore; Report	Pts: Bitim 23; Rebs: Auguste 13; Asts: Bitim 7 PIR: Bitim 31	Arena: Sinan Erdem Dome; Referees: Yener Yılmaz, Fatih Arslanoğlu, İsmail Binbir

3 April 2023 23	Fenerbahçe Beko	86–64	Galatasaray Nef	Istanbul
20:30	Scoring by quarter: 24–13, 23–12, 16–20, 23–19
	Pts: Pierre 15; Rebs: Hayes 9 Asts: Calathes 8 PIR: Pierre 22	Boxscore; Report	Pts: Kabaca 13; Rebs: Ristić 9 Asts: Russell 4 PIR: Ristić 18	Arena: Ülker Sports and Event Hall; Referees: Zafer Yılmaz, Mehmet Şahin, Murat Ciner

9 April 2023 24	Galatasaray Nef	94–90(OT)	Bahçeşehir Koleji	Ataköy, Istanbul
20:30	Scoring by quarter: 21–17, 23–22, 17–28, 22–16, Overtime: 11–7
	Pts: Kabaca 21; Rebs: Kabaca 6 Asts: Russell 7 PIR: Kabaca 23	Boxscore; Report	Pts: Smith 30; Rebs: Boutsiele 9 Asts: Hall 6 PIR: Smith 34	Arena: Sinan Erdem Dome; Referees: Emin Moğulkoç, Mehmet Karabilecen, Fatih Güler

15 April 2023 25	Gaziantep Basketbol	96–78	Galatasaray Nef	Ataköy, Istanbul
18:00	Scoring by quarter: 27–14, 21–17, 15–27, 33–30
	Pts: Egbunu 17; Rebs: Miller-McIntyre 6 Asts: Miller-McIntyre 11; PIR: Miller-McIntyre 24	Boxscore; Report	Pts: Caloiaro 23; Rebs: Caloiaro, McGee 5 Asts: Ennis 7 PIR: Caloiaro 29	Arena: Ahmet Cömert Sport Hall; Referees: Alper Altuğ Köselerli, Kaan Büyükçil, Ziya Özorhon

22 April 2023 26	Galatasaray Nef	82–92	ONVO Büyükçekmece	Ataköy, Istanbul
20:30	Scoring by quarter: 23–16, 13–33, 30–22, 16–21
	Pts: Caloiaro, Kabaca 20; Rebs: Caloiaro 9 Asts: Russell 5 PIR: Caloiaro 26	Boxscore; Report	Pts: Rivers 24; Rebs: Harris, Weber 6 Asts: Crawford 15; PIR: Rivers 30	Arena: Sinan Erdem Dome; Referees: Ali Serkan Emlek, Semih Vural, Göksun Öz

10 May 2023 27	Türk Telekom	106–91	Galatasaray Nef	Ankara
18:00	Scoring by quarter: 25–32, 29–15, 25–22, 27–22
	Pts: Taylor 28; Rebs: Öncel 6 Asts: Taylor 6 PIR: Taylor 32	Boxscore; Report	Pts: Ennis 25; Rebs: Agva 12; Asts: Russell 6 PIR: Ennis 24	Arena: Ankara Arena; Referees: Fatih Arslanoğlu, Alper Özgök, Murat Ciner
Note: Originally scheduled to be played on 30 April 2023. It was postponed due to the EuroCup match of Türk Telekom team.

6 May 2023 28	Galatasaray Nef	100–88	AYOS Konyaspor	Ataköy, Istanbul
13:00	Scoring by quarter: 25–16, 28–25, 25–23, 22–24
	Pts: Russell 29; Rebs: Caloiaro 8 Asts: Ennis 9 PIR: Russell 28	Boxscore; Report	Pts: Sulaimon 23; Rebs: Schilling 12; Asts: Pérez 13; PIR: Pérez 27	Arena: Sinan Erdem Dome; Referees: Mehmet Serdar Ünal, Ziya Özorhon, Özge Şentürk Bayraktar

13 May 2023 29	Yukatel Merkezefendi Basket	53–78	Galatasaray Nef	Denizli
13:00	Scoring by quarter: 18–14, 12–23, 9–21, 14–20
	Pts: Hamilton 18; Rebs: Hamilton, Rathan-Mayes 9 Asts: Tülüoğlu 6 PIR: Hamilton 22	Boxscore; Report	Pts: Ristić 17; Rebs: Kabaca, Köksal 8 Asts: Russell, Ennis 5 PIR: Ristić 23	Arena: Pamukkale University Arena; Referees: Mehmet Şahin, Hüseyin Çelik, Fatih Güler

20 May 2023 30	Galatasaray Nef	84–79	Manisa Büyükşehir Belediyespor	Ataköy, Istanbul
15:30	Scoring by quarter: 24–16, 12–23, 24–23, 24–17
	Pts: Ennis 23; Rebs: Ennis 11; Asts: Ennis 7 PIR: Ennis 35	Boxscore; Report	Pts: Cruz 22; Rebs: Anosike 16; Asts: Anosike 6 PIR: Anosike 22	Arena: Sinan Erdem Dome; Referees: Aytuğ Ekti, Erhan Gürsel, İsmail Bindir

==== Playoffs ====
===== Quarterfinals =====
Win Loss

26 May 2023 1	Türk Telekom	94–85 (Series: 1–0)	Galatasaray Nef	Ankara
18:00	Scoring by quarter: 22–16, 21–23, 26–24, 25–22
	Pts: Grant 28; Rebs: Jones 8 Asts: Taylor 5 PIR: Grant 32	Boxscore; Report	Pts: Ennis 21; Rebs: Caloiaro 8 Asts: Ennis, Köksal 5 PIR: Ennis 25	Arena: Ankara Arena; Referees: Mehmet Karabilecen, Alper Altuğ Köselerli, Özge Şentürk Bayraktar

30 May 2023 2	Galatasaray Nef	86–71 (Series: 1–1)	Türk Telekom	Ataköy, Istanbul
18:00	Scoring by quarter: 24–25, 15–21, 30–13, 17–12
	Pts: Ennis 19; Rebs: Ristić 7 Asts: Ennis 6 PIR: Ennis 25	Boxscore; Report	Pts: Grant 22; Rebs: Jones 10; Asts: Öncel 4 PIR: Jones 20	Arena: Sinan Erdem Dome; Referees: Can Mavisu, Kaan Büyükçil, Ali Şakacı

1 June 2023 3	Türk Telekom	91–77 (Series: 2–1)	Galatasaray Nef	Ankara
18:00	Scoring by quarter: 25–20, 23–20, 16–15, 27–22
	Pts: Grant 23; Rebs: Jones 8 Asts: Grant 7 PIR: Grant 31	Boxscore; Report	Pts: Ennis 23; Rebs: Kabaca 7 Asts: Russell 6 PIR: Ennis 21	Arena: Ankara Arena; Referees: Emin Moğulkoç, Yener Yılmaz, Murat Ciner

=== Basketball Champions League ===
==== Regular season ====
Pos	Team	Pld	W	L	PF	PA	PD	Pts	Qualification	GAL	HOL	OOS	LEG
1	(Turkey) Galatasaray Nef	6	4	2	514	473	+41	10	Advance to round of 16	—	88–75	85–91	86–71
2	(Israel) Hapoel Holon	6	4	2	516	499	+17	10	Advance to play-ins	82–73	—	88–83	101–79
3	(Belgium) Filou Oostende	6	3	3	481	481	0	9	Advance to play-ins	78–92	95–86	—	66–71
4	(Poland) Legia Warsaw	6	1	5	437	495	−58	7		76–90	81–84	59–68	—

Source: Groups Standings

==== Regular season matches ====
Win Loss

5 October 2022 RS1	Filou Oostende (Belgium)	78–92	(Turkey) Galatasaray Nef	Ostend, Belgium
20:00	Scoring by quarter: 19–29, 20–22, 20–23, 19–18
	Pts: Gillet 17; Rebs: Thurman 10; Asts: van der Vuurst de Vries 9 PIR: Gillet 24	Boxscore; Report	Pts: Bost 23; Rebs: Morgan 8 Asts: Angola 5 PIR: Bost 20	Arena: COREtec Dôme; Referees: Martin Horozov (BUL), Luis Castillo (SPA), Sergii Zashchuk (UKR)

11 October 2022 RS2	Galatasaray Nef (Turkey)	86–71	(Poland) Legia Warsaw	Ataköy, Istanbul
19:00	Scoring by quarter: 22–20, 17–26, 24–17, 23–8
	Pts: Caloiaro 22; Rebs: Kabaca 8 Asts: Bost 11; PIR: Bost 22	Boxscore; Report	Pts: Bērziņš 21; Rebs: Bērziņš, Kulka 8 Asts: Marble, McCallum 5 PIR: Bērziņš 27	Arena: Sinan Erdem Dome; Referees: Paulo Marques (POR), Lorenzo Baldini (ITA), Fernando Calatrava (SPA)

26 October 2022 RS3	Hapoel Holon (Israel)	82–73	(Turkey) Galatasaray Nef	Holon, Tel Aviv District, Israel
19:30	Scoring by quarter: 12–18, 29–17, 18–15, 23–23
	Pts: Green 22; Rebs: Jones 8 Asts: Ragland 5 PIR: Green 24	Boxscore; Report	Pts: Bost 17; Rebs: Angola 8 Asts: Bost 5 PIR: Bost 18	Arena: Holon Toto Hall; Referees: Boris Krejić (SLO), Gatis Saliņš (LVA), Martin Vulić (CRO)

23 November 2022 RS4	Galatasaray Nef (Turkey)	88–75	(Israel) Hapoel Holon	Ataköy, Istanbul
20:00	Scoring by quarter: 17–18, 28–21, 15–20, 28–16
	Pts: Ennis 24; Rebs: Caloiaro 10; Asts: Bost, Kabaca 5 PIR: Caloiaro 27	Boxscore; Report	Pts: Green 15; Rebs: Jones 7 Asts: Ragland 7 PIR: three player 5	Arena: Sinan Erdem Dome; Referees: Yohan Rosso (FRA), Paulo Marques (POR), Radomir Vojinovic (MNE)

6 December 2022 RS5	Galatasaray Nef (Turkey)	85–91	(Belgium) Filou Oostende	Ataköy, Istanbul
20:00	Scoring by quarter: 20–20, 19–13, 22–26, 24–32
	Pts: Ennis 21; Rebs: Ennis 9 Asts: Bost 6 PIR: Ennis 21	Boxscore; Report	Pts: Thurman 26; Rebs: Thurman 7 Asts: Van der Vuurst de Vries 11; PIR: Thurman 33	Arena: Sinan Erdem Dome; Referees: Antonio Conde (SPA), Georgios Poursanidis (GRE), Péter Praksch (HUN)

20 December 2022 RS6	Legia Warsaw (Poland)	76–90	(Turkey) Galatasaray Nef	Warsaw, Poland
22:00	Scoring by quarter: 12–20, 31–18, 16–29, 17–23
	Pts: McCallum 20; Rebs: Groselle 14; Asts: McCallum 5 PIR: Groselle 26	Boxscore; Report	Pts: McGee 20; Rebs: Caloiaro 6 Asts: Ennis 7 PIR: Caloiaro 20	Arena: Arena COS Torwar; Referees: Nicolas Maestre (FRA), Ivor Matejek (CZE), Ventsislav Velivov (BUL)

==== Round of 16 ====
Pos	Team	Pld	W	L	PF	PA	PD	Pts	Qualification	UNI	AEK	GAL	CSP
1	(Spain) Unicaja Málaga	6	5	1	494	434	+60	11	Advance to quarter-finals	—	88–66	81–76	99–88
2	(Greece) AEK	6	4	2	455	447	+8	10	Advance to quarter-finals	65–75	—	92–78	82–72
3	(Turkey) Galatasaray Nef	6	2	4	457	463	−6	8		72–67	71–81	—	100–73
4	(France) Limoges CSP	6	1	5	432	494	−62	7		67–84	63–69	69–60	—

Source: Round of 16 Standings

==== Round of 16 Matches ====
Win Loss

24 January 2023 R16-1	Galatasaray Nef (Turkey)	100–73	(France) Limoges CSP	Ataköy, Istanbul
20:00	Scoring by quarter: 20–20, 28–17, 25–18, 27–18
	Pts: Russell 20; Rebs: Ristić 11; Asts: Russell 6 PIR: Ristić 29	Boxscore; Report	Pts: Kyzlink 16; Rebs: Yeguete 4 Asts: Graves 6 PIR: Yeguete, Kyzlink 15	Arena: Sinan Erdem Dome; Referees: Ademir Zurapovic (BIH), Michal Proc (POL), Martin Vulic (CRO)

31 January 2023 R16-2	Galatasaray Nef (Turkey)	71–81	(Greece) AEK	Ataköy, Istanbul
18:00	Scoring by quarter: 19–18, 17–17, 21–26, 14–20
	Pts: Ennis 18; Rebs: Ristić 12; Asts: four players 3 PIR: Ristić 20	Boxscore; Report	Pts: Mitchell 19; Rebs: Mitchell 13; Asts: Flionis 9 PIR: Mitchell 25	Arena: Sinan Erdem Dome; Referees: Antonio Conde (SPA), Aleksandar Glisic (SRB), Nicolas Maestre (FRA)

7 March 2023 R16-3	Unicaja (Spain)	81–76	(Turkey) Galatasaray Nef	Málaga
20:30 (22:30 TRT)	Scoring by quarter: 26–21, 16–19, 20–21, 19–15
	Pts: Brizuela 20; Rebs: Kravish 11; Asts: Brizuela 4 PIR: Perry 20	Boxscore; Report	Pts: Caloiaro 19; Rebs: Ennis, Russell 7 Asts: Russell 5 PIR: Caloiaro 22	Arena: Jose Maria Martin Carpena Arena; Referees: Martin Horozov (BUL), Gatis Saliņš (LVA), Martin Vulić (CRO)
Note: Originally scheduled to be played on 8 February 2023. Postponed due to the 2023 Turkey–Syria earthquakes. Rescheduled to 7 March 2023.

9 March 2023 R16-4	Galatasaray Nef (Turkey)	72–67	(Spain) Unicaja	Ataköy, Istanbul
20:00	Scoring by quarter: 21–16, 20–21, 15–21, 16–9
	Pts: Caloiaro, Russell 15; Rebs: Caloiaro 9 Asts: Russell 4 PIR: Caloiaro 22	Boxscore; Report	Pts: Brizuela 12; Rebs: Díaz 8 Asts: Díaz 5 PIR: Díaz 18	Arena: Sinan Erdem Dome; Referees: Manuel Mazzoni (ITA), Lorenzo Baldini (ITA), Boris Krejić (SVN)

15 March 2023 R16-5	AEK (Greece)	92–78	(Turkey) Galatasaray Nef	Ano Liosia, Athens
19:30 (20:30 TRT)	Scoring by quarter: 29–31, 16–15, 18–15, 29–17
	Pts: Lemar 21; Rebs: Oriola, Janković 7 Asts: Flionis, Mitchell 4 PIR: Lemar 18	Boxscore; Report	Pts: Russell 28; Rebs: Ristić 8 Asts: three player 3 PIR: Russell 25	Arena: Ano Liosia Olympic Hall; Referees: Aleksandar Glisic (Serbia), Marius Ciulin (Romania), Gvidas Gedvilas (Lithuania)

21 March 2023 R16-6	Limoges CSP (France)	69–60(OT)	(Turkey) Galatasaray Nef	Limoges
20:30 (22:30 TRT)	Scoring by quarter: 17–9, 7–20, 17–15, 16–13, Overtime: 12–3
	Pts: Jones, Rodriguez 23; Rebs: Yeguete 13; Asts: Klassen 7 PIR: Yeguete 18	Boxscore; Report	Pts: Russell 13; Rebs: Ristić 9 Asts: Kabaca, Köksal 2 PIR: Ristić 15	Arena: Beaublanc; Referees: Lorenzo Baldini (ITA), Michal Proc (POL), Beniamino Attard (ITA)

=== Turkish Basketball Cup ===
==== Quarterfinals ====
Win Loss Postponed

15 February 2023 QF	Galatasaray Nef	Suspended	Türk Telekom	Istanbul
18:00
		Boxscore		Arena: Sinan Erdem Dome
Note: Originally scheduled to be played on 15 February 2023. Postponed due to the 2023 Turkey–Syria earthquakes.
