= Zabian Dowdell =

American basketball player (born 1984)

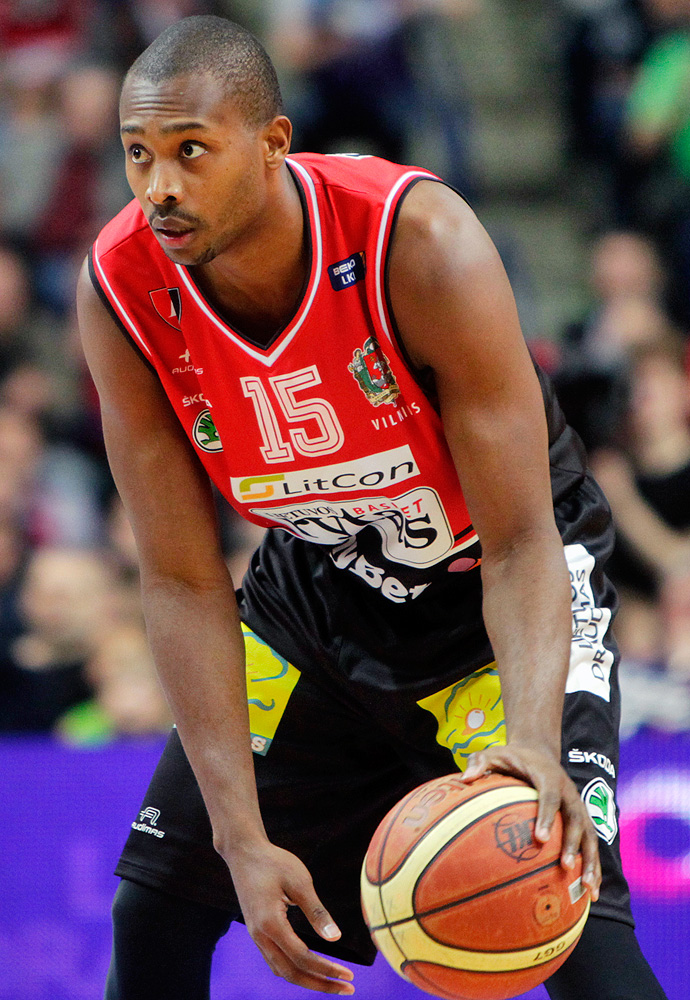
- Dowdell playing for Lietuvos rytas in 2014

Personal information
- Born: September 10, 1984 (age 42) Pahokee, Florida
- Listed height: 6 ft 2 in (1.88 m)
- Listed weight: 187 lb (85 kg)

Career information
- High school: Pahokee (Pahokee, Florida)
- College: Virginia Tech (2003–2007)
- NBA draft: 2007: undrafted
- Playing career: 2007–2020
- Position: Point guard

Career history
- 2007–2008: SLUC Nancy
- 2008–2009: Fastweb Casale Monferrato
- 2009–2010: Tulsa 66ers
- 2010: Unicaja Málaga
- 2010–2011: Tulsa 66ers
- 2011: Phoenix Suns
- 2012: Gran Canaria
- 2012–2013: Enisey Krasnoyarsk
- 2013–2014: Lietuvos rytas
- 2014–2015: Spirou Charleroi
- 2015–2016: Zenit Saint Petersburg
- 2016–2017: Cantù
- 2017–2018: Enisey
- 2018–2019: Champagne Châlons-Reims
- 2019–2020: Pistoia Basket 2000
- 2020: Rasta Vechta

Career highlights
- LNB Pro A champion (2008); LKL All-Star (2014); First-team All-ACC (2007); ACC All-Defensive Team (2007)
- Stats at NBA.com
- Stats at Basketball Reference

Zabian Dowdell (born September 10, 1984) is an American former professional basketball player. Born in Pahokee, Florida, he played basketball for his hometown's high school. He played college basketball for the Virginia Tech Hokies from 2003 to 2007. In his senior season he was named in the First-team All-ACC and the ACC All-Defensive team. Following his graduation from college, Dowdell played professionally mainly in Europe, also having brief stints in the NBA and the NBA D-League.

== Early life ==
Dowdell attended Pahokee High School, where he played high school basketball and was first team all-state as a junior and senior. In 2003, he was named The Palm Beach Post 6A-3A Player of the Year, Palm Beach Post Small School Player of the Year, and Florida Dairy Farmers 3A Player of the Year. As a senior, Dowdell averaged 23 points, eight assists and seven rebounds per game.

== College career ==
Dowdell attended and played college basketball at Virginia Tech from 2003 to 2007. A four-year starter, Dowdell and teammate Jamon Gordon were considered one of the best backcourt duos in the Atlantic Coast Conference. Dowdell is the seventh leading scorer (1,785) in Virginia Tech history, as well as fifth in assists (380), and third in steals (241). He was Seth Greenberg's first signee at Virginia Tech.

Dowdell scored in double figures in his first 41 ACC regular season games. He was named All-ACC honorable mention twice, All-ACC Defensive team twice, and All-American honorable mention in 2006–07. He was also named to the first team All-ACC during his senior season, becoming the first Hokie to do so. His accomplishments at the university led to his induction into the Virginia Tech Sports Hall of Fame in 2017.

=== Freshman season ===
Dowdell made his first collegiate start on November 22, 2003, in the win over the University of New Hampshire. During the game, he scored 15 points, with five assists and three steals. He scored a season-high 20 points during a win against West Virginia University. At the end of the regular season, Dowdell played in two games of the 2004 Big East tournament, during which he scored 21 points, and had eight assists and seven steals. Dowdell started 28 games and scored in double figures 15 times. He was second on the team in assists and scoring.

=== Sophomore season ===
On February 2, 2005, Dowdell tied a career-high with five three-pointers and scored a season-high 23 points in a win over the University of Miami in front of a large crowd from his hometown of Pahokee, Florida. On February 17, 2005, he hit the game-winning three-pointer and scored 11 points and two assists in the win over seventh-ranked Duke University in Cassell Coliseum, one of the most famous victories in Virginia Tech basketball history. After the regular season, Dowdell totaled 24 points, four rebounds and three assists in two games of the 2005 National Invitation Tournament, including 16 points in a first-round win over Temple University. The tournament was Virginia Tech's first postseason appearance in nine years and their first National Invitation Tournament appearance in a decade.

Dowdell started 29 games and scored in double figures 26 times. He averaged 14.4 points and had four games of 20 or more points. He was 16th in scoring in the ACC (tenth in league games), 11th in steals, and third in three-point field goal percentage. He was named an All-ACC honorable mention and first-team All-State by the Virginia Sports Information Directors (VaSID) and the Richmond Times-Dispatch.

=== Junior season ===
On December 7, 2005, Dowdell scored a then career-high 25 points against North Carolina A&T State University, as well as career highs in field goals made (nine), three-point field goals made (seven; tying a school record) and three-point field goals attempted (12). On January 21, 2006, he scored 21 points and had six assists against the University of Maryland. During the game, he hit eight of his final 12 shots and scored his 1,000th career point. After the regular season, he scored 15 points against the University of Virginia in the 2006 ACC tournament. He also had four assists and four steals.

Dowdell led the Hokies in scoring (15.3 ppg), steals (70) and minutes played. He started 28 of 30 games and scored in double figures 28 times. He was named an All-ACC Honorable mention for the second consecutive season and second-team All-State by the Richmond Times-Dispatch. Dowdell was also named to the ACC All-Defensive team.

=== Senior season ===
On January 6, 2007, Dowdell scored 20 points and had five steals in an overtime win against fifth-ranked Duke University in Cameron Indoor Stadium, the Hokies first win at that arena. On January 13, 2007, he scored 23 points and had four steals in a win over the first-ranked University of North Carolina in Cassell Coliseum, ending North Carolina's 12-game winning streak. On February 13, 2007, Dowdell scored a career-high 33 points in an 81–80 overtime win again against fourth-ranked North Carolina in the Dean Smith Center, completing the sweep. He scored six of those points in overtime, and made 17 of 19 free throws, including the game-winning points with a pair of foul shots with 1 minute 27 seconds remaining. After the regular season, he scored 28 points, had six assists, and had five steals in two games of the 2007 ACC tournament. Dowdell then scored 15 points in two games of the 2007 NCAA tournament. The first-round game, a win against the University of Illinois, was the Hokies' first NCAA Tournament victory since the 1996 NCAA tournament.

Dowdell started in 33 games, scored in double figures 29 times, led the Hokies in scoring (17.4 ppg), and finished second in steals (71) and assists (106). He was second in the ACC in steals per game (2.1) and fifth in free three percentage (80.6). Dowdell was named the ACC Player of the Week twice during the season. He also earned All-ACC first team honors (becoming the first Hokie to do so), and was named to the All-ACC Defensive team.

== Professional career ==
=== NBA draft ===
Before the NBA draft, Dowdell played with the Tidewater Sealants in the Portsmouth Invitational Tournament, which is the oldest amateur basketball tournament and is the only postseason camp conducted for the top NCAA seniors. Dowdell and the Sealants lost in the opening round against Holiday Inn Portsmouth, 110–71, and Dowdell led the Sealants in scoring with 22 points. Dowdell then went undrafted in the 2007 NBA draft. He was projected to go as high as #28 in the first round to the San Antonio Spurs, and many other mock drafts had him going in the second round.

=== SLUC Nancy ===
After going undrafted in the 2007 NBA draft, Dowdell played for the NBA's Seattle SuperSonics in the 2007 NBA Summer League at the Thomas & Mack Center and the Cox Pavilion in Las Vegas, Nevada from July 6 to the 15.

He then signed a contract with the French team SLUC Nancy of the French League. On June 15, 2008, Dowdell and SLUC Nancy won the LNB Championship game against defending champion Chorale Roanne Basket, 84–53. He played for 14 minutes and scored two points.

Dowdell and SLUC Nancy also played in the 2007–08 ULEB Cup (now known as the ULEB Eurocup), a competition that included 54 teams, initially divided in nine groups of six teams. SLUC Nancy, who played in Group D, was eliminated during the round-robin group stage (regular season) and did not participate in the knockout stage or the playoffs. Dowdell played in all ten regular season games and had 112 points, 32 assists, 28 rebounds and 12 steals.

=== Pallacanestro Casale ===
Dowdell signed with A.S. Junior Pallacanestro Casale (known as Fastweb Casale) in the LegADue, the second-highest division of professional basketball in Italy. He played in all 30 regular season games and averaged 20.7 points per game. On November 2, 2008, he scored a season-high 36 points in a win against Trenkwalder Reggio Emilia, 91–87. In the quarterfinals of the postseason, Fastweb Casale won three straight games against Coopsette Rimini to sweep the series and advance. In the three games, Dowdell had 39 points, 11 assists, 12 rebounds, and five steals. Fastweb Casale then lost the semi-final series, 3–2, against Vanoli Soresina and were eliminated. In that series, Dowdell had 91 points, 15 assists, 20 rebounds, and 12 steals.

=== NBA D-League and Spanish clubs ===
Dowdell played for the Phoenix Suns in the NBA Summer League in 2010. His play allowed him to sign up for their training camp with undrafted rookie ex-Northeastern Husky Matt Janning and veteran NBA point guard Chucky Atkins.

Following the NBA Summer League, he signed a deal with the Tulsa 66ers, one of the NBA Development League teams. After four months, he decided to move on, accepting an offer of the Spanish club Unicaja Málaga.

In 2012, he signed with Gran Canaria.

=== Phoenix Suns ===
On January 9, 2011, the Suns signed Dowdell to a ten-day contract. He signed a second ten-day contract on January 27, 2011. Dowdell was featured in the January 31, 2011 issue of Sports Illustrated in an article about NBA players with ten-day contracts. On February 7, 2011, the Suns signed Dowdell through the remainder of the season. On December 13, the Suns announced that they had waived Dowdell and replaced him with Ronnie Price. On January 18, 2012, Dowdell signed a contract with Anadolu Efes Pilsen. However, due to a failed physical, he was waived.

=== 2012–2020 ===
On March 1, 2012, after passing his physical exam, Dowdell signed with CB Gran Canaria in Spain.

In July 2012, Dowdell signed with Enisey Krasnoyarsk in Russia.

On December 3, 2013, he signed a contract with Lietuvos Rytas. Over three Euroleague games, he averaged 12 points, 3 assists and 2.7 rebounds per game.

On August 19, 2014, Dowdell signed a contract with the Belgian team Spirou Charleroi.

On July 16, 2015, he signed a one-year contract with the Russian club Zenit Saint Petersburg.

On August 28, 2016, Dowdell signed with Italian club Pallacanestro Cantù for the 2016–17 season.

On November 28, 2018, he signed with Champagne Châlons-Reims Basket of the LNB Pro A.

On July 25, 2019, he signed with Pistoia of the Italian Lega Basket Serie A (LBA). But, before the end of the season, the team decided to replace him with the new hire Randy Culpepper and, because the number of foreign players exceeded the limit, Dowdell transferred in Germany to Rasta Vechta.

== Career statistics ==
Legend
GP	Games played	GS	Games started	MPG	Minutes per game
FG%	Field-goal percentage	3P%	3-point field-goal percentage	FT%	Free-throw percentage
RPG	Rebounds per game	APG	Assists per game	SPG	Steals per game
BPG	Blocks per game	PPG	Points per game	PIR	Performance index rating
**Bold**	Career high

=== NBA ===
Year	Team	GP	GS	MPG	FG%	3P%	FT%	RPG	APG	SPG	BPG	PPG
2010–11	Phoenix	24	0	12.2	.408	.300	.941	.8	2.1	.8	.1	5.0
Career		24	0	12.2	.408	.300	.941	.8	2.1	.8	.1	5.0

=== EuroLeague ===
Year	Team	GP	GS	MPG	FG%	3P%	FT%	RPG	APG	SPG	BPG	PPG	PIR
2009–10	Unicaja	6	0	16.2	.364	.385	.714	.8	1.7	1.2	.0	7.0	4.2
2013–14	Lietuvos Rytas	3	2	22.9	.615	.000	1.000	2.7	3.0	1.3	.0	12.0	14.0
Career		9	2	18.4	.457	.313	.818	1.4	2.1	1.2	.0	8.7	7.4

=== College ===
Year	Team	GP	GS	MPG	FG%	3P%	FT%	RPG	APG	SPG	BPG	PPG
2003–04	Virginia Tech	28	28	33.8	.375	.305	.689	3.0	3.2	1.9	.1	10.8
2004–05	Virginia Tech	30	29	32.6	.449	.423	.713	3.1	2.7	1.6	.2	14.4
2005–06	Virginia Tech	30	28	36.0	.417	.358	.696	3.1	3.4	2.3	.2	15.3
2006–07	Virginia Tech	34	33	33.8	.462	.386	.806	3.6	3.1	2.1	.2	17.4
Career		122	118	34.1	.430	.367	.745	3.2	3.1	2.0	.2	14.5
