= ULEB Cup 2007–08 Regular Season Group C =

In basketball, these are Group C standings and results.

Key to colors
Top three places in each group, plus five highest-ranked four-places teams, advance to Top 32
Eliminated

== Standings ==
	Team	Pld	W	L	PF	PA	Diff
1.	(Spain) Akasvayu Girona	10	7	3	846	747	99
2.	(Turkey) Galatasaray Cafe Crown	10	7	3	805	725	80
3.	(Serbia) Hemofarm	10	6	4	822	813	9
4.	(Romania) CSU Asesoft	10	4	6	758	763	-5
5.	(Belgium) Spirou Charleroi	10	4	6	718	747	-29
6.	(Netherlands) Hanzevast Capitals	10	2	8	761	915	-154

== Results/Fixtures ==
All times given below are in Central European Time.

=== Game 1 ===
November 6, 2007

November 6
18:00

Hemofarm (Serbia)	73–71	(Belgium) Spirou Charleroi
Scoring by quarter: 17-23, 10-17, 24-12, 22-19

Vršac

November 6
19:00

CSU Asesoft (Romania)	80–73	(Netherlands) Hanzevast Capitals
Scoring by quarter: 13-21, 20-13, 15-22, 32-17

Ploieşti

November 6
19:00

Galatasaray Cafe (Turkey)	71–69	(Spain) Akasvayu Girona
Scoring by quarter: 22-22, 17-15, 22-15, 10-17

Galatasaray

=== Game 2 ===
November 13, 2007

November 13
19:30

Hanzevast Capitals (Netherlands)	60–93	(Turkey) Galatasaray Cafe
Scoring by quarter: 18-27, 15-18, 8-21, 19-27

Groningen

November 13
20:05

Spirou Charleroi (Belgium)	64–58	(Romania) CSU Asesoft
Scoring by quarter: 18-16, 13-12, 17-16, 16-14

Charleroi

November 13
20:45

Akasvayu Girona (Spain)	87–61	(Serbia) Hemofarm
Scoring by quarter: 27-14, 24-20, 17-12, 19-15

Girona

=== Game 3 ===
November 20, 2007

November 20
18:00

Hemofarm (Serbia)	95–85	(Romania) CSU Asesoft
Scoring by quarter: 28-22, 24-25, 26-14, 17-24

Vršac

November 20
19:00

Galatasaray Cafe (Turkey)	75–83	(Belgium) Spirou Charleroi
Scoring by quarter: 16-24, 20-18, 21-20, 18-21

Galatasaray

November 20
20:45

Akasvayu Girona (Spain)	96–63	(Netherlands) Hanzevast Capitals
Scoring by quarter: 32-13, 18-11, 24-18, 22-21

Girona

=== Game 4 ===
November 27-November 28, 2007

November 27
18:00

Hemofarm (Serbia)	102–77	(Netherlands) Hanzevast Capitals
Scoring by quarter: 26-23, 25-12, 28-23, 23-19

Vršac

November 27
20:05

Spirou Charleroi (Belgium)	71–74	(Spain) Akasvayu Girona
Scoring by quarter: 24-18, 20-22, 13-18, 14-16

Charleroi

November 28
18:00

CSU Asesoft (Romania)	81–83	(Turkey) Galatasaray Cafe
Scoring by quarter: 19-24, 20-16, 19-22, 23-21

Ploieşti

=== Game 5 ===
December 4, 2007

December 4
19:00

Galatasaray Cafe (Turkey)	86–71	(Serbia) Hemofarm
Scoring by quarter: 23-21, 25-18, 20-19, 18-13

Galatasaray

December 4
19:30

Hanzevast Capitals (Netherlands)	79–73	(Belgium) Spirou Charleroi
Scoring by quarter: 24-22, 17-18, 12-12, 26-21

Groningen

December 4
20:45

Akasvayu Girona (Spain)	73–65	(Romania) CSU Asesoft
Scoring by quarter: 18-9, 24-15, 20-17, 11-24

Girona

=== Game 6 ===
December 11, 2007

December 11
19:30

Hanzevast Capitals (Netherlands)	81–95	(Romania) CSU Asesoft
Scoring by quarter: 19-17, 19-23, 19-23, 24-32

Groningen

December 11
20:05

Spirou Charleroi (Belgium)	64–78	(Serbia) Hemofarm
Scoring by quarter: 11-21, 18-24, 15-18, 20-15

Charleroi

December 11
20:45

Akasvayu Girona (Spain)	89–78	(Turkey) Galatasaray Cafe
Scoring by quarter: 28-23, 12-21, 25-11, 24-23

Girona

=== Game 7 ===
December 18, 2007

December 18
19:00

CSU Asesoft (Romania)	80–71	(Belgium) Spirou Charleroi
Scoring by quarter: 18-18, 27-25, 15-8, 20-20

Ploieşti

December 18
19:30

Hemofarm (Serbia)	97–93	(Spain) Akasvayu Girona
Scoring by quarter: 22-17, 20-17, 29-22, 26-37

Vršac

December 18
20:45

Galatasaray Cafe (Turkey)	101–67	(Netherlands) Hanzevast Capitals
Scoring by quarter: 24-12, 23-16, 32-10, 22-29

Galatasaray

=== Game 8 ===
January 8, 2008

January 8
18:00

CSU Asesoft (Romania)	72–83	(Serbia) Hemofarm
Scoring by quarter: 26-17, 10-22, 16-19, 20-25

Ploieşti

January 8
19:30

Hanzevast Capitals (Netherlands)	91–105	(Spain) Akasvayu Girona
Scoring by quarter: 17-30, 21-23, 22-21, 31-31

Groningen

January 8
20:05

Spirou Charleroi (Belgium)	64–62	(Turkey) Galatasaray Cafe
Scoring by quarter: 19-13, 15-21, 13-16, 17-12

Charleroi

=== Game 9 ===
January 15, 2008

January 15
19:00

Galatasaray Cafe (Turkey)	72–64	(Romania) CSU Asesoft
Scoring by quarter: 15-13, 13-17, 20-17, 24-17

Galatasaray

January 15
19:30

Hanzevast Capitals (Netherlands)	94–85	(Serbia) Hemofarm
Scoring by quarter: 27-20, 16-26, 25-15, 26-24

Groningen

January 15
20:45

Akasvayu Girona (Spain)	92–72	(Belgium) Spirou Charleroi
Scoring by quarter: 19-17, 24-10, 22-22, 27-23

Girona

=== Game 10 ===
January 22, 2008

January 22
19:00

Hemofarm (Serbia)	77–84	(Turkey) Galatasaray Cafe
Scoring by quarter: 20-16, 17-18, 23-18, 17-32

Vršac

January 22
19:00

CSU Asesoft (Romania)	78–68	(Spain) Akasvayu Girona
Scoring by quarter: 15-17, 30-14, 13-17, 20-20

Ploieşti

January 22
19:00

Spirou Charleroi (Belgium)	85–76	(Netherlands) Hanzevast Capitals
Scoring by quarter: 25-19, 24-21, 20-12, 16-24

Charleroi
