= Tyrus McGee =

American basketball player (born 1991)

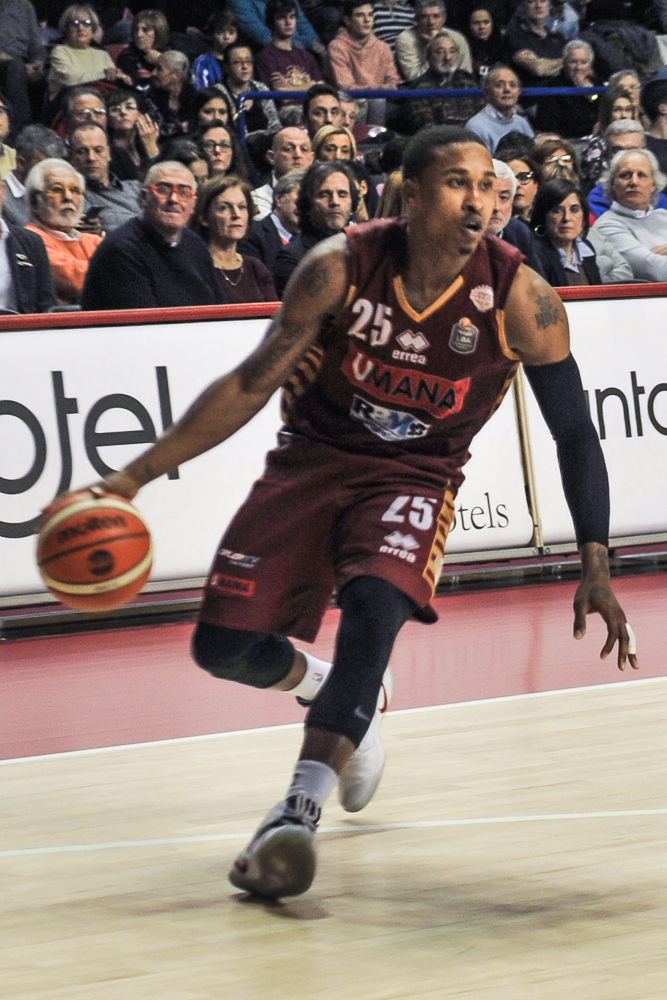
- McGee with Venezia in 2017

No. 25 – Taipei Taishin Mars
- Position: Shooting guard
- League: Taiwan Professional Basketball League

Personal information
- Born: March 14, 1991 (age 35) Stringtown, Oklahoma, U.S.
- Listed height: 188 cm (6 ft 2 in)
- Listed weight: 93 kg (205 lb)

Career information
- High school: Stringtown (Stringtown, Oklahoma)
- College: Cowley (2009–2011); Iowa State (2011–2013)
- NBA draft: 2013: undrafted
- Playing career: 2013–present

Career history
- 2013–2014: Breogán
- 2014–2015: Eisbären Bremerhaven
- 2015: Orlandina
- 2015–2016: Vanoli Cremona
- 2016–2017: Reyer Venezia
- 2017–2018: Pistoia 2000
- 2018: Afyon Belediye
- 2019: Dinamo Sassari
- 2019–2020: Élan Béarnais
- 2020–2021: Hapoel Holon
- 2021–2022: San Pablo Burgos
- 2022: Hapoel Holon
- 2022: Fujian Sturgeons
- 2022–2023: Galatasaray Nef
- 2023: Hapoel Eilat
- 2023–2024: SIG Strasbourg
- 2024–2025: Pallacanestro Cantù
- 2025–2026: Scaligera Basket Verona
- 2026–present: Taipei Taishin Mars

Career highlights
- FIBA Europe Cup champion (2019); Israeli League champion (2022); Italian League champion (2017)

Tyrus Bresdon McGee (born March 14, 1991) is an American professional basketball player for the Taipei Taishin Mars of the Taiwan Professional Basketball League (TPBL). He has previously played for Iowa State.

== College career ==
The Oklahoma native played collegiately for Arkansas City, Kansas, of the Kansas Jayhawk Community College Conference in the National Junior College Athletic Association from 2009.

He transferred to Iowa State of the Big 12 Conference in 2011. With Iowa State he got averaging 7.9 points, 3.3 rebounds and 0.6 assists in the 2011–12 season, and 13.1 points, 3.5 rebounds and 1.3 assists in the 2012–13 season.

=== College statistics ===
Year	Team	GP	GS	MPG	FG%	3P%	FT%	RPG	APG	SPG	BPG	PPG
2011–12	Iowa State	34	-	19.9	.426	.394	.839	3.3	.6	.5	.2	7.7
2012–13	Iowa State	35	2	24.0	.488	.464	.820	3.5	1.3	1.1	.3	13.1
Career		69	2	22.0	.465	.437	.829	3.4	1.0	.8	.3	10.5

== Professional career ==
In 2013 McGee began his European experience. He joined the second league of the Spanish basketball league system LEB Oro side Club Baloncesto Breogán.

In July 2014, McGee signed with Eisbären Bremerhaven in Basketball Bundesliga, Germany. The following year, he went to Orlandina Basket in highest league of the Italian basketball league system LBA, from March 2015 till the end of the 2014–15 season.

The American player signed with Vanoli Cremona on July 24, 2015. In the 2015-16 LBA season he placed 4th in the League Table and reached the playoffs.

On July 22, 2016, McGee signed with Reyer Venezia for the 2016–17 season. During this season with Reyer he won an Italian Championship.

On August 9, 2017, McGee signed with Pistoia Basket.

On July 28, 2018, McGee left Italy after three years and signed with the Turkish Afyon Belediye.

On August 7, 2019, he has signed a contract with Élan Béarnais of the French LNB Pro A. McGee averaged 13.8 points per game. On August 5, 2020, he signed with Hapoel Holon of the Israeli Basketball Premier League.

On July 16, 2021, he signed with San Pablo Burgos of the Spanish Liga ACB. San Pablo Burgos also plays in the Basketball Champions League. McGee averaged 10.5 points, 2.1 assists, and 1.7 rebounds per game but left the team in January 2022.

On January 28, 2022, he signed with Hapoel Holon of the Israeli Premier League, winning the Israeli league championship with the team at the end of that season, and qualifying for the BCL Final Four tournament. On November 8, he signed with Galatasaray Nef of the Turkish Basketbol Süper Ligi.

On August 3, 2023, he signed with Hapoel Eilat of the Israeli Basketball Premier League. On December 12, he signed with SIG Strasbourg of the French LNB Pro A.

On July 17, 2024, McGee signed with the Pallacanestro Cantù of the Serie A2.

On July 15, 2025, McGee signed with the Scaligera Basket Verona of the Serie A2.

On August 18, 2026, McGee signed with the Taipei Taishin Mars of the Taiwan Professional Basketball League (TPBL).

== Honours ==
Reyer Venezia

- LBA champion: 2016–17

Dinamo Sassari

- FIBA Europe Cup: 2018–19
