= Stringtown High School =

Location
- 304 Highland St, Stringtown; Stringtown, Oklahoma; United States
- Coordinates: 34°27′57″N 96°3′9″W

Information
- School type: Public Public
- School district: Stringtown School District 7
- Staff: 4.50 (FTE)
- Grades: 9–12
- Enrollment: 82 (2023-2024)
- Student to teacher ratio: 18.22
- Colors: Blue, gold
- Mascot: Tiger
- Website: stringtown.k12.ok.us

Stringtown High School is a public high school in Stringtown, Oklahoma, United States. Located in southeast Oklahoma in Atoka County, it is part of the Stringtown School District and a member of the Oklahoma Secondary School Activities Association (OSSAA).

== Activities and clubs ==
Activities and clubs include academic team, choir, National Honor Society, and the Future Farmers of America.

== Sports ==
Baseball

Stringtown High plays Fall Ball and Spring at Washington Dickson Field. In 1983, Stringtown won the OSSAA state championship over Taloga High with Coach Tony Potts.

Basketball

Stringtown High Boys Basketball has won four OSSAA State Championships with two repeat championships in 1983, 1984 and 2007, 2008. With head coach Dirk Walden, the team had 98 wins and 14 losses from 2006 to 2009.

== Notable alumni ==
- Tyrus McGee (born 1991), basketball player in the Israel Basketball Premier League
- U L Washington is a former Major League Baseball player from 1977 to 1987 for the Kansas City Royals, Montreal Expos, and Pittsburgh Pirates. Washington had 20 seasons of playing professional baseball. After his playing career he became a coach in professional baseball.
