= ULEB Cup 2007–08 Knockout Stage =

ULEB Cup 2007–08 Knockout Stage are the main rounds of ULEB Cup 2007-08, included Sixteenth Finals and Eighthfinals.

== Draw Seeds ==
RKG	Group Place	Team (Group)	Seed
1.	1	(Turkey) Beşiktaş Cola Turka (B)	1
2.	1	(Spain) DKV Joventut (A)	1
3.	1	(Russia) Triumph Lyubertsy (E)	1
4.	1	(Russia) Dynamo Moscow (F)	1
5.	1	(Spain) Pamesa Valencia (D)	1
6.	1	(Spain) CB Gran Canaria (G)	1
7.	1	(Poland) PGE Turów Zgorzelec (I)	1
8.	1	(Spain) Akasvayu Girona (C)	1
9.	1	(Italy) Benetton Treviso (H)	2
10.	2	(Turkey) Türk Telekom (A)	2
11.	2	(Russia) Khimki Moscow Region (D)	2
12.	2	(Turkey) Galatasaray Cafe Crown (C)	2
13.	2	(Montenegro) Budućnost Podgorica (E)	2
14.	2	(Ukraine) BC Kyiv (H)	2
15.	2	(Croatia) Zadar (I)	2
16.	2	(Latvia) BK Ventspils (B)	2

RKG	Group Place	Team (Group)	Seed
17.	2	(France) ASVEL Villeurbanne (G)	3
18.	2	(Belgium) Telindus BC Oostende (F)	3
19.	3	(Bulgaria) Lukoil Academic (H)	3
20.	3	(Serbia) Hemofarm (C)	3
21.	3	(Ukraine) Azovmash Mariupol (D)	3
22.	3	(Serbia) Red Star Belgrade (F)	3
23.	3	(Germany) Köln 99ers (B)	3
24.	3	(Russia) UNICS Kazan (I)	3
25.	3	(Greece) Panionios B.C. (G)	4
26.	3	(Austria) Allianz Swans Gmunden (E)	4
27.	3	(Bosnia and Herzegovina) KK Bosna (A)	4
28.	4	(Poland) Asco Śląsk Wrocław (G)	4
29.	4	(Czech Republic) CEZ Nymburk (F)	4
30.	4	(France) Elan Chalon (B)	4
31.	4	(Israel) Hapoel Jerusalem (I)	4
32.	4	(Germany) Artland Dragons (H)	4

== Elimination rounds ==
=== Sixteenth Finals ===
The draw to determine a bracket for the elimination rounds of the 2007-08 ULEB Cup was held on Monday, January 28, 2008, at 13:30 CET in the Museu Olimpic i de l'Esport in Barcelona.

Team #1	Agg.	Team #2	1st leg	2nd leg
Asco Śląsk Wrocław (Poland)	161 - 177	(Russia) Dynamo Moscow	78 - 85	83 - 92
Lukoil Academic (Bulgaria)	140 - 119	(Latvia) BK Ventspils	67 - 64	73 - 55
Telindus BC Oostende (Belgium)	121 - 133	(Ukraine) BC Kyiv	61 - 65	60 - 68
CEZ Nymburk (Czech Republic)	127 - 129	(Poland) Turów Zgorzelec	61 - 61	66 - 68
Elan Chalon (France)	150 - 163	(Spain) Akasvayu Girona	93 - 85	57 - 78
Hemofarm (Serbia)	155 - 134	(Montenegro) Budućnost Podgorica	82 - 56	73 - 78
UNICS Kazan (Russia)	184 - 161	(Turkey) Türk Telekom	91 - 65	93 - 96
Artland Dragons (Germany)	161 - 157	(Russia) Triumph Lyubertsy	81 - 75	80 - 82
Allianz Swans Gmunden (Austria)	115 - 166	(Spain) DKV Joventut	59 - 89	56 - 77
Köln 99ers (Germany)	141 - 187	(Russia) Khimki	72 - 91	69 - 96
Azovmash Mariupol (Ukraine)	142 - 157	(Croatia) Zadar	82 - 80	60 - 77
Panionios B.C. (Greece)	131 - 141	(Spain) Pamesa Valencia	70 - 59	61 - 82
Hapoel Jerusalem (Israel)	141 - 146	(Turkey) Beşiktaş Cola Turka	88 - 73	53 - 73
Red Star Belgrade (Serbia)	164 - 153	(Italy) Benetton Treviso	81 - 71	83 - 82
Adecco ASVEL Villeurbanne (France)	144 - 145	(Turkey) Galatasaray Cafe Crown	69 - 69	75 - 76
KK Bosna (Bosnia and Herzegovina)	158 - 171	(Spain) Gran Canaria	89 - 82	69 - 89

==== First leg ====
February 19, 2008

February 19
17:00

UNICS Kazan (Russia)	91–65	(Turkey) Türk Telekom
Scoring by quarter: 23-10, 14-28, 24-12, 30-15

Basket Hall Arena, Kazan
Attendance: 4,000

February 19
17:00

Azovmash Mariupol (Ukraine)	82–80	(Croatia) Zadar
Scoring by quarter: 17-13, 22-17, 28-25, 15-25

Azovmash Arena, Mariupol
Attendance: 3,100

February 19
18:00

CEZ Nymburk (Czech Republic)	61–61	(Poland) Turów Zgorzelec
Scoring by quarter: 19-12, 15-9, 12-20, 15-20

ČEZ Arena, Nymburk
Attendance: 10,460

February 19
18:00

Hapoel Jerusalem (Israel)	88–73	(Turkey) Beşiktaş Cola Turka
Scoring by quarter: 11-13, 30-16, 25-21, 22-23

Malha Arena, Jerusalem
Attendance: 5,000

February 19
18:00

Red Star Belgrade (Serbia)	81–71	(Italy) Benetton Treviso
Scoring by quarter: 30-19, 15-17, 15-13, 21-22

Pionir Hall, Belgrade
Attendance: 1,500

February 19
18:10

Panionios B.C. (Greece)	70–59	(Spain) Pamesa Valencia
Scoring by quarter: 24-8, 14-16, 12-19, 20-16

National Athletic Center Makis Liougas, Athens
Attendance: 500

February 19
18:30

Lukoil Academic (Bulgaria)	67–64	(Latvia) BK Ventspils
Scoring by quarter: 16-17, 18-16, 18-22, 15-9

Universiada Hall, Sofia
Attendance: 3,000

February 19
19:30

Artland Dragons (Germany)	81–75	(Russia) Triumph Lyubertsy
Scoring by quarter: 16-24, 15-12, 21-17, 29-22

Artland-Arena, Quakenbrück
Attendance: 3,000

February 19
19:30

Allianz Swans Gmunden (Austria)	59–89	(Spain) DKV Joventut
Scoring by quarter: 17-23, 11-28, 16-18, 15-20

Volksbank-Arena Gmunden, Gmunden
Attendance: 1,450

February 19
19:30

Köln 99ers (Germany)	72–91	(Russia) Khimki
Scoring by quarter: 26-30, 15-16, 22-20, 9-25

GEW Energy Dome, Köln
Attendance: 1,000

February 19
20:00

Asco Śląsk Wrocław (Poland)	78–85	(Russia) Dynamo Moscow
Scoring by quarter: 25-25, 14-17, 20-21, 19-22

Hala Orbita, Wrocław
Attendance: 4,000

February 19
20:00

Hemofarm (Serbia)	82–56	(Montenegro) Budućnost Podgorica
Scoring by quarter: 22-13, 20-15, 20-15, 20-13

Millennium Centar, Vršac
Attendance: 2,200

February 19
20:00

KK Bosna (Bosnia and Herzegovina)	89–82	(Spain) Gran Canaria
Scoring by quarter: 26-25, 24-26, 21-17, 18-14

Dvorana Mirza Delibašić, Bosna
Attendance: 5,300

February 19
20:30

Telindus BC Oostende (Belgium)	61–65	(Ukraine) BC Kyiv
Scoring by quarter: 19-25, 16-6, 16-11, 10-23

Sleuyter Arena, Ostend
Attendance: 4,238

February 19
20:30

Elan Chalon (France)	93–85	(Spain) Akasvayu Girona
Scoring by quarter: 32-26, 21-18, 25-21, 15-20

Le Colisée, Chalon-sur-Saône
Attendance: 4,000

February 19
20:30

Adecco ASVEL (France)	69–69	(Turkey) Galatasaray Cafe
Scoring by quarter: 26-22, 17-17, 16-17, 10-13

L'Astroballe, Villeurbanne
Attendance: 5,497

==== Second leg ====
February 26–27, 2008

February 26
17:00

Triumph Lyubertsy (Russia)	82–80	(Germany) Artland Dragons
Scoring by quarter: 21-24, 16-15, 22-18, 23-23

SH Triumph, Lyubertsy
Attendance: 4,000

February 26
17:00

Khimki (Russia)	96–69	(Germany) Köln 99ers
Scoring by quarter: 26-20, 24-13, 22-19, 24-17

Novator, Khimki
Attendance: 3,000

February 26
18:00

Turów Zgorzelec (Poland)	68–66	(Czech Republic) CEZ Nymburk
Scoring by quarter: 18-21, 23-13, 13-13, 14-19

Tipsport Arena, Liberec
Attendance: Not avivable

February 26
18:00

Türk Telekom (Turkey)	96–93	(Russia) UNICS Kazan
Scoring by quarter: 25-19, 24-18, 20-31, 27-25

Ankara Atatürk Sport Hall, Ankara
Attendance: 3,500

February 26
18:15

Dynamo Moscow (Russia)	92–83	(Poland) Asco Śląsk Wrocław
Scoring by quarter: 29-17, 21-20, 23-26, 19-20

Krylatskoe Sport Palace, Moscow
Attendance: 3,000

February 26
18:30

Beşiktaş Cola Turka (Turkey)	73–53	(Israel) Hapoel Jerusalem
Scoring by quarter: 16-16, 21-17, 17-12, 19-8

BJK Akatlar Arena, Istanbul
Attendance: 4,500

February 26
18:40

BK Ventspils (Latvia)	55–73	(Bulgaria) Lukoil Academic
Scoring by quarter: 21-22, 9-19, 17-15, 8-17

Ventspils Nafta Hall, Ventspils
Attendance: 2,500

February 26
19:00

BC Kyiv (Ukraine)	68–60	(Belgium) Telindus BC Oostende
Scoring by quarter: 13-18, 23-13, 11-15, 21-14

Palace of Sports, Kyiv
Attendance: 4,850

February 26
19:00

Budućnost Podgorica (Montenegro)	78–73	(Serbia) Hemofarm
Scoring by quarter: 22-20, 22-16, 20-16, 14-21

Morača Sports Center, Podgorica
Attendance: 1,250

February 26
19:00

Zadar (Croatia)	77–60	(Ukraine) Azovmash Mariupol
Scoring by quarter: 18-19, 17-11, 18-13, 24-17

Jazine Basketball Hall, Zadar
Attendance: 3,000

February 26
20:00

DKV Joventut (Spain)	77–56	(Austria) Allianz Swans Gmunden
Scoring by quarter: 20-20, 9-12, 35-14, 13-10

Pavelló Olímpic de Badalona, Joventut
Attendance: 3,243

February 26
20:15

Galatasaray Cafe (Turkey)	76–75	(France) Adecco ASVEL
Scoring by quarter: 22-18, 13-27, 22-15, 19-15

Ayhan Şahenk, Galatasaray
Attendance: 3,000

February 26
20:30

Benetton Treviso (Italy)	82–83	(Serbia) Red Star Belgrade
Scoring by quarter: 16-24, 26-24, 23-5, 17-30

Palaverde, Treviso
Attendance: Not avivable

February 26
20:45

Akasvayu Girona (Spain)	78–57	(France) Elan Chalon
Scoring by quarter: 22-12, 19-10, 16-15, 21-20

Palau Girona-Fontajau, Girona
Attendance: 3,575

February 26
21:30

Gran Canaria (Spain)	89–69	(Bosnia and Herzegovina) KK Bosna
Scoring by quarter: 20-10, 18-12, 31-22, 20-25

Centro Insular, Las Palmas
Attendance: 4,945

February 27
20:45

Pamesa Valencia (Spain)	82–61	(Greece) Panionios B.C.
Scoring by quarter: 16-12, 17-16, 18-12, 31-21

Fuente San Luis, Valencia
Attendance: 5,500

==== Points difference ====
Total

Dynamo Moscow (Russia)	177–161	(Poland) Asco Śląsk Wrocław

Total

BK Ventspils (Latvia)	119–140	(Bulgaria) Lukoil Academic

Total

BC Kyiv (Ukraine)	133–121	(Belgium) Telindus BC Oostende

Total

Turów Zgorzelec (Poland)	129–127	(Czech Republic) CEZ Nymburk

Total

Akasvayu Girona (Spain)	163–150	(France) Elan Chalon

Total

Budućnost Podgorica (Montenegro)	134–155	(Serbia) Hemofarm

Total

Türk Telekom (Turkey)	161–184	(Russia) UNICS Kazan

Total

Triumph Lyubertsy (Russia)	157–161	(Germany) Artland Dragons

Total

DKV Joventut (Spain)	166–115	(Austria) Allianz Swans Gmunden

Total

Khimki (Russia)	187–141	(Germany) Köln 99ers

Total

Zadar (Croatia)	157–142	(Ukraine) Azovmash Mariupol

Total

Pamesa Valencia (Spain)	141–131	(Greece) Panionios B.C.

Total

Beşiktaş Cola Turka (Turkey)	146–141	(Israel) Hapoel Jerusalem

Total

Benetton Treviso (Italy)	153–164	(Serbia) Red Star Belgrade

Total

Galatasaray Cafe (Turkey)	145–144	(France) Adecco ASVEL

Total

Gran Canaria (Spain)	171–158	(Bosnia and Herzegovina) KK Bosna

=== Eighthfinals ===
The winners from Sixteenth-finals advance to Eighthfinals.

Team #1	Agg.	Team #2	1st leg	2nd leg
Lukoil Academic (Bulgaria)	152 - 192	(Russia) Dynamo Moscow	75 - 89	77 - 103
BC Kyiv (Ukraine)	126 - 129	(Poland) PGE Turów Zgorzelec	59 - 71	67 - 58
Hemofarm (Serbia)	133 - 156	(Spain) Akasvayu Girona	71 - 80	62 - 76
Artland Dragons (Germany)	139 - 152	(Russia) UNICS Kazan	80 - 78	59 - 74
Khimki (Russia)	127 - 165	(Spain) DKV Joventut	73 - 96	54 - 69
Zadar (Croatia)	144 - 162	(Spain) Pamesa Valencia	74 - 69	70 - 93
Red Star Belgrade (Serbia)	149 - 161	(Turkey) Beşiktaş Cola Turka	80 - 80	69 - 81
Galatasaray Cafe Crown (Turkey)	178 - 162	(Spain) Gran Canaria	99 - 74	79 - 88

==== First leg ====
March 11, 2008

March 11
17:00

Lukoil Academic (Bulgaria)	75–89	(Russia) Dynamo Moscow
Scoring by quarter: 25-29, 19-24, 13-15, 18-21

Universiada Hall, Sofia
Attendance: 3,500

March 11
17:00

Khimki (Russia)	73–96	(Spain) DKV Joventut
Scoring by quarter: 20-21, 19-20, 20-26, 14-29

Novator, Khimki
Attendance: 3,500

March 11
18:00

Red Star Belgrade (Serbia)	80–80	(Turkey) Beşiktaş Cola Turka
Scoring by quarter: 20-17, 14-19, 25-22, 21-22

Pionir Hall, Belgrade
Attendance: 2,500

March 11
19:00

BC Kyiv (Ukraine)	59–71	(Poland) Turów Zgorzelec
Scoring by quarter: 16-24, 9-10, 11-15, 23-22

Palace of Sports, Kyiv
Attendance: 4,100

March 11
19:00

Zadar (Croatia)	74–69	(Spain) Pamesa Valencia
Scoring by quarter: 28-24, 18-16, 18-15, 10-14

Jazine Basketball Hall, Zadar
Attendance: 3,000

March 11
19:30

Artland Dragons (Germany)	80–78	(Russia) UNICS Kazan
Scoring by quarter: 12-22, 36-17, 21-18, 11-21

Artland-Arena, Quakenbrück
Attendance: 3,000

March 11
20:00

Hemofarm (Serbia)	71–80	(Spain) Akasvayu Girona
Scoring by quarter: 21-21, 22-22, 15-27, 13-10

Millennium Centar, Vršac
Attendance: 2,500

March 11
20:15

Galatasaray Cafe Crown (Turkey)	99–74	(Spain) Gran Canaria
Scoring by quarter: 30-15, 27-17, 17-24, 25-18

Ayhan Şahenk, Galatasaray
Attendance: 2,500

==== Second leg ====
March 18–19, 2008

March 18
17:00

UNICS Kazan (Russia)	74–59	(Germany) Artland Dragons
Scoring by quarter: 19-19, 21-13, 10-14, 24-13

Basket Hall Arena, Kazan
Attendance: 3,000

March 18
18:00

Turów Zgorzelec (Poland)	58–67	(Ukraine) BC Kyiv
Scoring by quarter: 18-21, 19-15, 8-16, 13-15

Tipsport Arena, Liberec
Attendance: 3,500

March 18
18:15

Dynamo Moscow (Russia)	103–77	(Bulgaria) Lukoil Academic
Scoring by quarter: 25-21, 30-20, 31-18, 17-18

Krylatskoe Sport Palace, Moscow
Attendance: 4,000

March 18
18:30

Beşiktaş Cola Turka (Turkey)	81–69	(Serbia) Red Star Belgrade
Scoring by quarter: 24-18, 17-16, 24-16, 16-19

BJK Akatlar Arena, Istanbul
Attendance: 5,500

March 18
20:45

Akasvayu Girona (Spain)	76–62	(Serbia) Hemofarm
Scoring by quarter: 19-14, 16-17, 18-14, 23-17

Palau Girona-Fontajau, Girona
Attendance: 3,769

March 18
20:45

DKV Joventut (Spain)	69–54	(Russia) Khimki
Scoring by quarter: 19-15, 17-8, 14-18, 19-13

Pavelló Olímpic de Badalona, Joventut
Attendance: 5,774

March 18
21:30

Gran Canaria (Spain)	88–79	(Turkey) Galatasaray Cafe Crown
Scoring by quarter: 25-20, 23-21, 11-20, 29-18

Centro Insular, Las Palmas
Attendance: 5,020

March 19
17:00

Pamesa Valencia (Spain)	93–70	(Croatia) Zadar
Scoring by quarter: 28-21, 19-22, 25-8, 21-19

Fuente San Luis, Valencia
Attendance: 6,000

==== Points difference ====
Total

Dynamo Moscow (Russia)	192–152	(Bulgaria) Lukoil Academic

Total

Turów Zgorzelec (Poland)	129–126	(Ukraine) BC Kyiv

Total

Akasvayu Girona (Spain)	156–133	(Serbia) Hemofarm

Total

UNICS Kazan (Russia)	152–139	(Germany) Artland Dragons

Total

DKV Joventut (Spain)	165–126	(Russia) Khimki

Total

Pamesa Valencia (Spain)	162–144	(Croatia) Zadar

Total

Beşiktaş Cola Turka (Turkey)	161–149	(Serbia) Red Star Belgrade

Total

Gran Canaria (Spain)	162–178	(Turkey) Galatasaray Cafe Crown

=== Final Eight ===
The Final Eight of ULEB Cup 2007-08 were played in Turin, Italy. The matches were played from April 10 to April 13. There were quarter-finals, semi-finals and final. The Torino Palavela hosted the Final Eight.

==== Bracket ====
Quarter-finals
April 11, Turin
(Russia) Dynamo Moscow	78
(Poland) Turów Zgorzelec	63
April 11, Turin
(Spain) Akasvayu Girona	75
(Russia) UNICS Kazan	66
April 10, Turin
(Spain) DKV Joventut	77
(Spain) Pamesa Valencia	67
April 10, Turin
(Turkey) Beşiktaş Cola Turka	60
(Turkey) Galatasaray CC	61

Semi-finals
April 12, Turin
(Russia) Dynamo Moscow	78
(Spain) Akasvayu Girona	81
April 12, Turin
(Spain) DKV Joventut	90
(Turkey) Galatasaray CC	83

Final
April 13, Turin
(Spain) Akasvayu Girona	54
(Spain) DKV Joventut	79
Third place
April 13, Turin
(Russia) Dynamo Moscow	84
(Turkey) Galatasaray CC	67
