= John Egbunu =

Nigerian basketball player (born 1994)

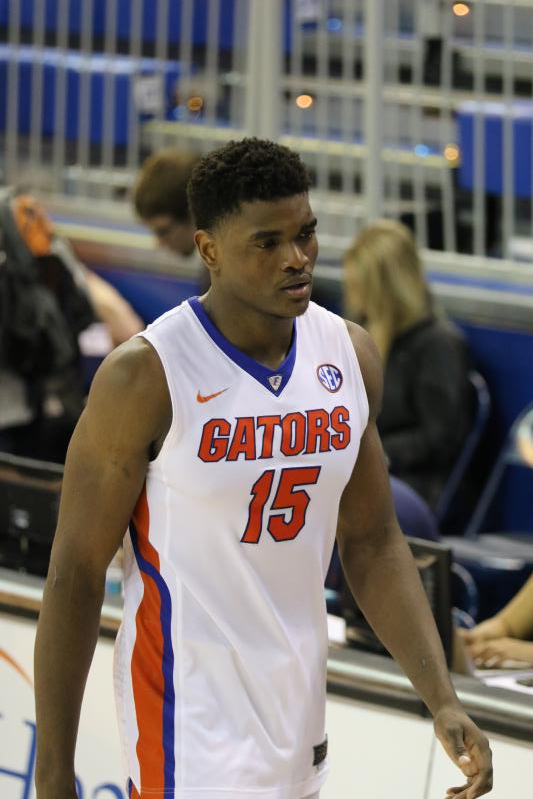
- Egbunu with Florida in 2015

No. 15 – Śląsk Wrocław
- Position: Center
- League: PLK

Personal information
- Born: October 31, 1994 (age 32) Bauchi, Nigeria
- Listed height: 2.11 m (6 ft 11 in)
- Listed weight: 114 kg (251 lb)

Career information
- High school: Ft. Walton Beach (Fort Walton Beach, Florida)
- College: South Florida (2013–2014); Florida (2015–2018)
- NBA draft: 2018: undrafted
- Playing career: 2019–present

Career history
- 2019–2020: Long Island Nets
- 2020: Busan KT Sonicboom
- 2021: Varese
- 2021–2022: Hapoel Jerusalem
- 2022–2023: Gaziantep
- 2023–2024: ASVEL
- 2024: Ningbo Rockets
- 2024: Shanghai Sharks
- 2024–2025: Breogán
- 2025: Napoli
- 2025: Meralco Bolts
- 2025–2026: Ulsan Hyundai Mobis Phoebus
- 2026–present: Śląsk Wrocław

Career highlights
- AAC All-Rookie Team (2014)
- Stats at Basketball Reference

John Onuche Egbunu (born October 31, 1994) is a Nigerian professional basketball player for Śląsk Wrocław of the Polish Basketball League (PLK). Standing 6 ft 11 in (2.11 m), he plays the center position. He played college basketball for the University of South Florida and the University of Florida.

== Early life ==
Egbunu was born in 1994 in Nigeria. He later moved to the United States, settling in Georgia. He attended high school at Georgia Elite in Atlanta, where he played his freshman and sophomore seasons of basketball. Egbunu later moved to Fort Walton Beach for his junior and senior seasons. As a high school athlete, Egbunu was recorded as having a 40-in vertical jump. He was also ranked 72nd by ESPN on its list of top high school recruits. He ranked 7th nationally as an overall high school recruit. At 6'10", Egbunu was recognized for his strong rim defense and ability to run the floor.

== College career ==
Egbunu played his freshman season in 2013–14 at the University of South Florida (USF). He started 31 of 32 games and enjoyed a successful freshman season. He set the record of most rebounds for a freshman with a total of 198. He scored season highs of 11 points and 11 rebounds against Santa Clara and 20 points and 20 rebounds against Memphis. Egbunu averaged 7.4 points and 6.2 rebounds as a freshman, earning American Athletic Conference All-Rookie Team honors. Following the season, he transferred to Florida, sitting out the 2014–15 season per NCAA regulations.

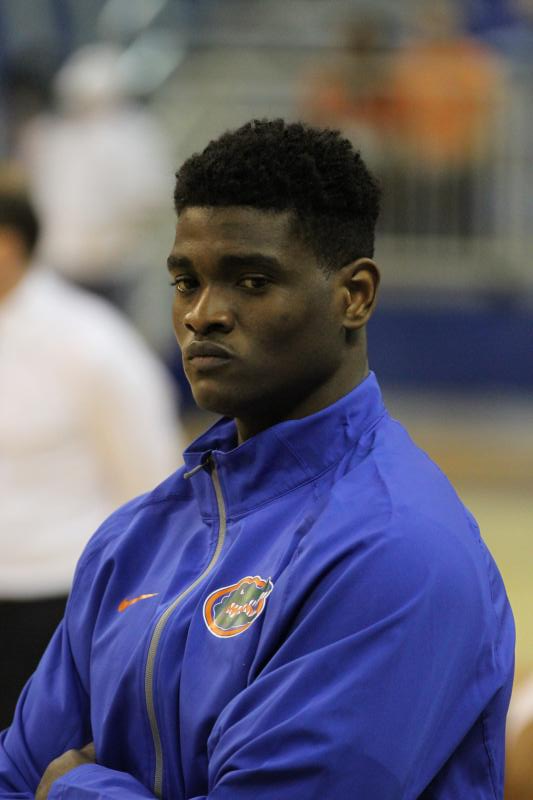
Egbunu playing for Florida

Appearing on the court for his first season of play, Egbunu's 2015–16 sophomore season featured tremendous success. He recorded his first double-double as a Gator (third total) with 17 points and 11 rebounds against Florida Gulf Coast. In the Gators' game against Richmond, both Egbunu and teammate Devin Robinson set record double-doubles (Egbunu with 17 points, 14 rebounds and Robinson with 12 points, 13 rebounds) in the same game, accomplishing a feat not seen since former Gators Vernon Macklin and Alex Tyus did so in a 2010 game against Jacksonville. During his sophomore season, Egbunu suffered a torn ligament in his right thumb prior to the SEC Tournament and appeared in only three games following the injury before undergoing season-ending surgery. He would miss the Gators' final two games. During his sophomore season, Egbunu led the Gators in most blocked shots (48), with a field goal percentage of .591 and ranked 2nd in rebounds with 6.5 on average.

During Egbunu's 2016–17 junior season, he started 19 of 24 total games played and averaged 7.8 points and 6.6 rebounds per game. His season was cut short by a torn ACL suffered on February 14, 2017. He would not return for his 2017–18 senior season as he continued to rehabilitate his ACL injury. While at UF, Egbunu played a total of 58 games and started 49 of those games. He posted a career total of 578 points and 378 rebounds.

== Professional career ==
Egbunu entered the NBA draft as early as 2017 before withdrawing. He entered the following year and was not selected.

=== Long Island Nets (2019–2020) ===
On September 25, 2019, Egbunu signed a contract with the Brooklyn Nets and briefly attended their training camp. On October 14, Egbunu's contract was waived.

Egbunu joined the Long Island Nets and started 5 of 26 games played during the 2019–2020 season. He missed several games with a sprained ankle. On December 27, 2019, Egbunu scored a career-high 26 points and grabbed 10 rebounds in a 107–91 loss to the Canton Charge. He averaged 10.3 points 7.4 rebounds, and 1.3 blocks per game.

=== Busan KT Sonicboom (2020) ===
On June 12, 2020, Egbunu signed with the Busan KT Sonicboom of the Korean Basketball League (KBL). On October 29, he was replaced by Brandon Brown.

=== Pallacanestro Varese (2021) ===
On January 29, 2021, he signed for Pallacanestro Varese of the Italian Lega Basket Serie A (LBA) until the end of the 2020–21 season. Egbunu averaged 8.4 points, 7.6 rebounds, and 1.5 blocks per game. He re-signed with the team on July 22. Egbunu averaged 11.0 points and 9.4 rebounds per game. His contract was terminated on December 24.

=== Hapoel Jerusalem (2021–2022) ===
The following day, Egbunu signed with Hapoel Jerusalem of the Israeli Premier League.

=== Gaziantep and ASVEL (2022–2024) ===
On June 29, 2022, he has signed with Gaziantep Basketbol of the Basketbol Süper Ligi (BSL). Egbunu averaged 11.5 points, 7.6 rebounds, and 1.3 blocks per game. On July 6, 2023, he signed with ASVEL. Egbunu was waived on January 16, 2024, after averaging 2.9 points and 2.5 rebounds per game.

=== Ningbo Rockets (2024) ===
On February 17, 2024, Egbunu signed with the Ningbo Rockets of the Chinese Basketball Association (CBA).

=== Shanghai Sharks (2024) ===
On October 5, 2024, Egbunu signed with the Shanghai Sharks of the Chinese Basketball Association.

=== CB Breogán (2024–2025) ===
On December 18, 2024, Egbunu signed with the CB Breogán of the Liga ACB.

=== Napoli Basket (2025) ===
On January 27, 2025, Egbunu signed with the Napoli Basket of the Lega Basket Serie A (LBA).

=== Śląsk Wrocław (2026–present) ===
On August 23, 2026, he signed with Śląsk Wrocław of the Polish Basketball League (PLK).

== Career statistics ==
Legend
GP	Games played	GS	Games started	MPG	Minutes per game
FG%	Field-goal percentage	3P%	3-point field-goal percentage	FT%	Free-throw percentage
RPG	Rebounds per game	APG	Assists per game	SPG	Steals per game
BPG	Blocks per game	PPG	Points per game	PIR	Performance index rating
**Bold**	Career high

=== EuroLeague ===
Year	Team	GP	GS	MPG	FG%	3P%	FT%	RPG	APG	SPG	BPG	PPG	PIR
2023–24	ASVEL	19	2	11.7	.571	—	.389	2.5	.5	.1	.2	2.9	3.4
Career		19	2	11.7	.571	—	.389	2.5	.5	.1	.2	2.9	3.4
