= Muhaymin Mustafa =

Turkish basketball player (born 1999)

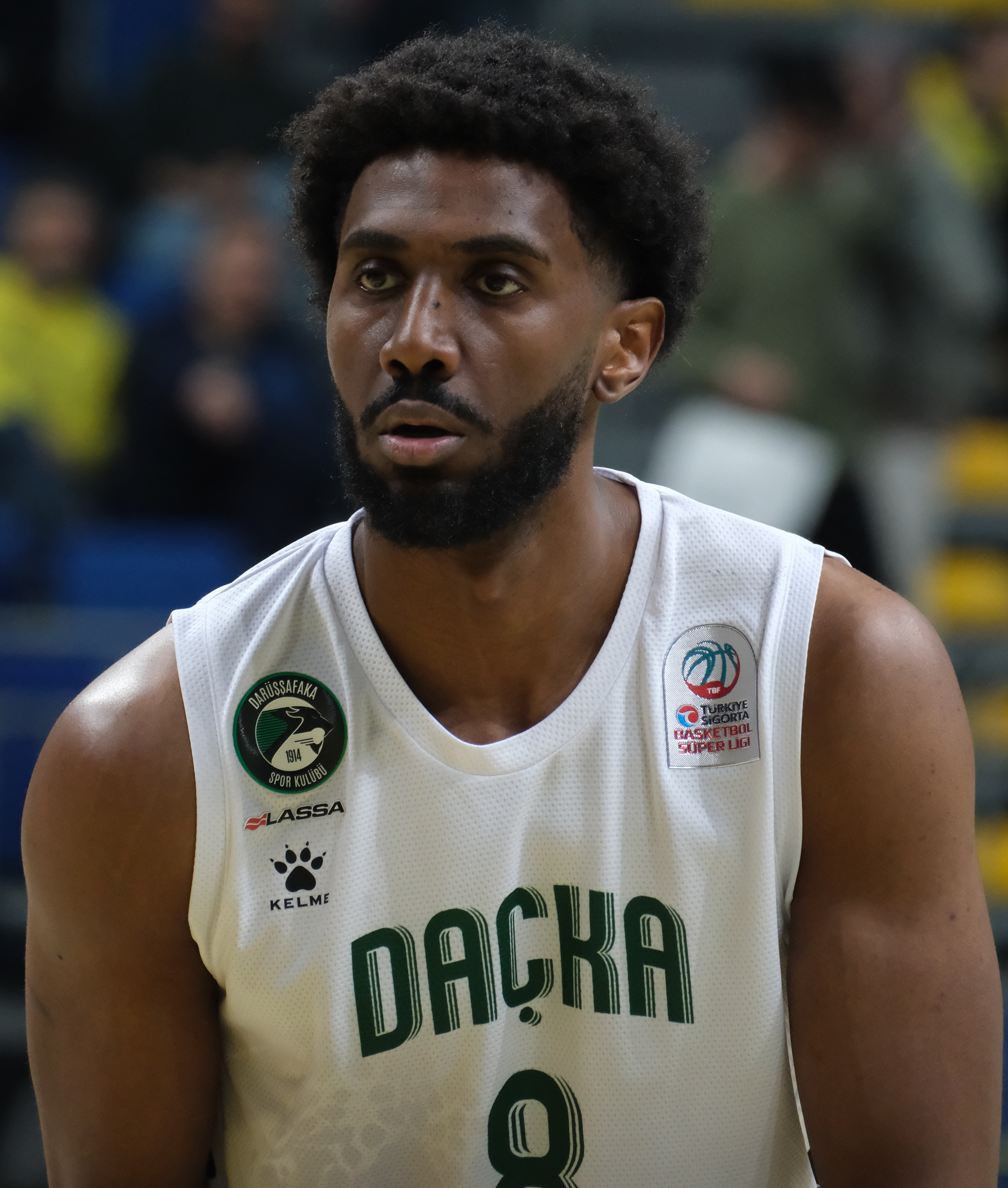
- Mustafa with Darüşşafaka

No. 1 – Karşıyaka Basket
- Position: Small forward / shooting guard
- League: Basketbol Süper Ligi

Personal information
- Born: 10 October 1999 (age 27) Nicosia, North Cyprus
- Listed height: 6 ft 7 in (2.01 m)
- Listed weight: 200 lb (91 kg)

Career information
- Playing career: 2015–present

Career history
- 2015–2020: Anadolu Efes
- 2015–2016: →Pertevniyal
- 2016–2017: →Anadolu Efes Gelişim
- 2018: →İstanbulspor Beylikdüzü
- 2018–2020: →Tofaş
- 2020–2022: Ionikos Nikaias
- 2022–2023: Galatasaray Ekmas
- 2023–2024: Merkezefendi Bld. Denizli Basket
- 2024–2025: Darüşşafaka
- 2026: Büyükçekmece Basketbol
- 2026–present: Karşıyaka Basket

Career highlights
- Turkish Cup winner (2018)

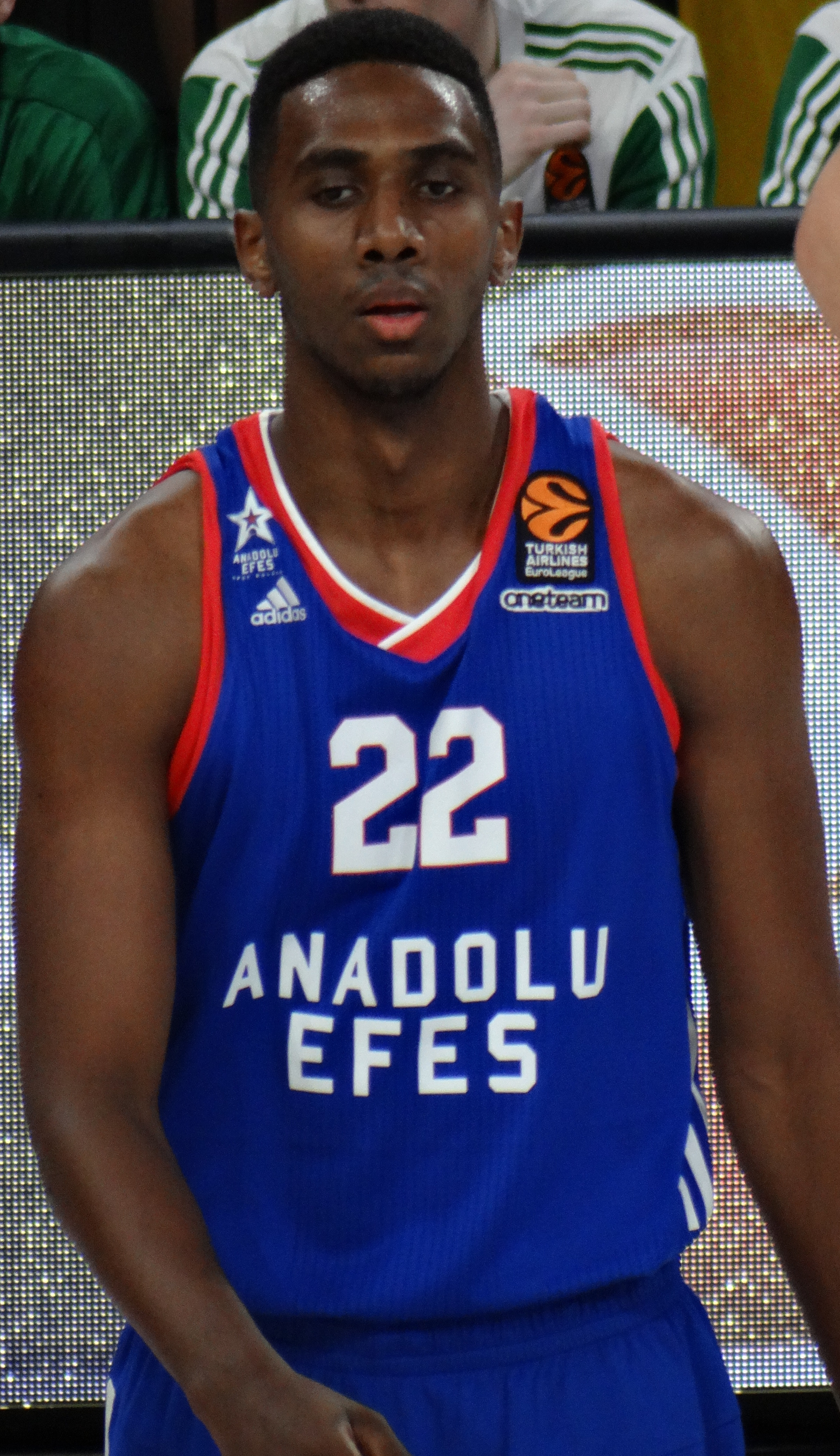
Mustafa with Anadolu Efes

Muhaymin Mustafa (born 10 October 1999) is a Sudanese-Turkish professional basketball player for Karşıyaka Basket of the Turkish Basketbol Süper Ligi (BSL).

== Early life ==
Muhaymin Mustafa was born in North Nicosia to Sudanese parents who moved to Cyprus for higher education. Muhaymin grew up in Kyrenia. He excelled in track and field as well as basketball where he won the national championship in both long jump and high jump events in primary school. He was scouted by Anadolu Efes along with his brother and both of them moved to Istanbul to join Anadolu Efes when Muhaymin was 10.

== Professional career ==
Mustafa made his professional debut with Pertevniyal in Turkish Basketball First League (TBL) during the 2015-2016 season. Pertevniyal's long term agreement as a feeder club to Efes was concluded after that season, resulting Anadolu Efes fielding a B team, Anadolu Efes Gelişim to the Regional League. He moved to this team while playing for the firsts in friendly games occasionally. Mustafa was also named to the training camp roster of Anadolu Efes which was held in Slovenia in 2016.

Mustafa made his Basketbol Süper Ligi (BSL) debut on 8 October 2017, two days before his 18th birthday against Pınar Karşıyaka. He recorded 8 points against Banvit on 25 December 2017 as his personal record in BSL. He made his EuroLeague debut on 29 December 2017 against Brose Bamberg.

On 9 January 2018, Mustafa signed a two-way contract with the TBL team İstanbulspor Beylikdüzü allowing him to play both İstanbulspor and Anadolu Efes in a move intended to maximise his playing time. On 23 February 2018, he received his first start in a EuroLeague game against Zalgiris Kaunas. He started as a small forward, finishing the game with four points and an assist.

=== Ionikos Nikaias (2020–2022) ===
Mustafa moved to the Greek Basket League for the 2020-2021 season, averaging 4.9 points, 2.9 rebounds, and 1.2 steals with Ionikos Nikaias. On 12 September 2021 he renewed his contract with the Greek club for another two years. During the 2021-22 campaign, in a total of 20 games, he averaged 8.4 points, 4.6 rebounds and 1.3 assists, playing around 24 minutes per contest.

=== Galatasaray Ekmas (2022–2023) ===
On June 25, 2022, Mustafa signed with Galatasaray Ekmas of the Basketbol Süper Ligi (BSL).

=== Merkezefendi Bld. Denizli Basket (2023–2024) ===
On December 6, 2023, he signed with Merkezefendi Bld. Denizli Basket of the Basketbol Süper Ligi (BSL).

=== Darüşşafaka (2024–2025) ===
On November 1, 2024, he signed with Darüşşafaka of the Basketbol Süper Ligi (BSL).

=== Büyükçekmece Basketbol (2026) ===
On January 16, 2026, he signed with ONVO Büyükçekmece of the Basketbol Süper Ligi (BSL).

=== Karşıyaka Basket (2026–present) ===
On August 6, 2026, he signed with Karşıyaka Basket of the Turkish Basketbol Süper Ligi (BSL).

== International career ==
Mustafa has chosen to represent Turkey on the international level. He played for the under 16, under 17 and the under 18 national teams. He received the bronze medal in 2015 FIBA Europe Under-16 Championship and the silver medal in 2016 FIBA Under-17 World Championship. He also represented Turkey in 2017 FIBA Europe Under-18 Championship, finishing in fourth-place. Mustafa was called up to the national B team for their training camp in August 2021.
