= ULEB Cup 2007–08 Regular Season Group D =

These are the Group D Standings and Results:

Key to colors
Top three places in each group, plus five highest-ranked four-places teams, advance to Top 32
Eliminated

== Standings ==
	Team	Pld	W	L	PF	PA	Diff
1.	(Spain) Pamesa Valencia	10	8	2	798	730	68
2.	(Russia) Khimki Moscow Region	10	8	2	849	790	59
3.	(Ukraine) Azovmash Mariupol	10	6	4	791	796	−5
4.	(France) Nancy	10	4	6	796	794	2
5.	(Poland) Anwil Włocławek	10	4	6	751	783	−32
6.	(Germany) Deutsche Bank Skyliners	10	0	10	700	792	−92

== Results/Fixtures ==
All times given below are in Central European Time.

=== Game 1 ===
6–7 November 2007

6 November
17:30

Khimki (Russia)	90–81	(France) Nancy
Scoring by quarter: 23–25, 18–18, 27–15, 22–23

Khimki

6 November
18:30

Anwil Włocławek (Poland)	66–70	(Ukraine) Azovmash Mariupol
Scoring by quarter: 22–16, 14–21, 16–17, 14–16

Włocławek

7 November
20:30

Pamesa Valencia (Spain)	85–63	(Germany) D. Bank Skyliners
Scoring by quarter: 17–20, 22–14, 24–14, 22–15

Valencia

=== Game 2 ===
13 November 2007

13 November
17:00

Azovmash Mariupol (Ukraine)	91–93	(Russia) Khimki
Scoring by quarter: 23–26, 31–22, 14–22, 23–23

Mariupol

13 November
19:30

D. Bank Skyliners (Germany)	65–67	(Poland) Anwil Włocławek
Scoring by quarter: 17–15, 15–17, 14–17, 19–18

Frankfurt

13 November
20:00

Nancy (France)	81–86	(Spain) Pamesa Valencia
Scoring by quarter: 26–25, 13–14, 22–22, 20–25

Nancy

=== Game 3 ===
20 November 2007

20 November
17:00

Khimki (Russia)	81–69	(Germany) D. Bank Skyliners
Scoring by quarter: 25–20, 17–15, 15–17, 24–17

Khimki

20 November
20:00

Nancy (France)	80–57	(Ukraine) Azovmash Mariupol
Scoring by quarter: 16–18, 25–7, 22–18, 17–14

Nancy

20 November
20:30

Pamesa Valencia (Spain)	78–58	(Poland) Anwil Włocławek
Scoring by quarter: 19–14, 22–17, 17–4, 20–23

Valencia

=== Game 4 ===
27 November 2007

27 November
18:00

Anwil Włocławek (Poland)	99–102 (OT)	(Russia) Khimki
Scoring by quarter: 23–22, 23–22, 22–19, 21–26, 10–13

Włocławek

27 November
19:30

D. Bank Skyliners (Germany)	83–84	(France) Nancy
Scoring by quarter: 25–29, 26–14, 16–25, 16–16

Frankfurt

27 November
20:30

Pamesa Valencia (Spain)	95–77	(Ukraine) Azovmash Mariupol
Scoring by quarter: 27–13, 20–13, 20–24, 28–27

Valencia

=== Game 5 ===
4 December 2007

4 December
17:00

Azovmash Mariupol (Ukraine)	84–80	(Germany) D. Bank Skyliners
Scoring by quarter: 21–20, 19–18, 19–21, 25–21

Mariupol

4 December
17:00

Khimki (Russia)	81–78	(Spain) Pamesa Valencia
Scoring by quarter: 16–27, 32–20, 21–17, 12–14

Khimki

4 December
20:00

Nancy (France)	92–66	(Poland) Anwil Włocławek
Scoring by quarter: 23–18, 20–11, 24–17, 25–20

Nancy

=== Game 6 ===
11 December 2007

11 December
17:00

Azovmash Mariupol (Ukraine)	89–83	(Poland) Anwil Włocławek
Scoring by quarter: 25–21, 22–19, 18–22, 24–21

Mariupol

11 December
19:30

D. Bank Skyliners (Germany)	68–76	(Spain) Pamesa Valencia
Scoring by quarter: 17–29, 17–12, 13–19, 21–16

Frankfurt

11 December
20:00

Nancy (France)	77–80	(Russia) Khimki
Scoring by quarter: 24–23, 14–24, 21–21, 18–12

Nancy

=== Game 7 ===
18 December 2007

18 December
17:00

Khimki (Russia)	100–102 (OT)	(Ukraine) Azovmash Mariupol
Scoring by quarter: 23–13, 26–29, 16–24, 18–17, 17–19

Khimki

18 December
18:00

Anwil Włocławek (Poland)	87–64	(Germany) D. Bank Skyliners
Scoring by quarter: 22–13, 13–17, 26–18, 26–16

Włocławek

18 December
20:30

Pamesa Valencia (Spain)	93–92	(France) Nancy
Scoring by quarter: 25–29, 24–14, 23–24, 21–25

Valencia

=== Game 8 ===
8 January 2008

8 January
17:00

Azovmash Mariupol (Ukraine)	76–62	(France) Nancy
Scoring by quarter: 16–17, 31–18, 14–15, 15–12

Mariupol

8 January
18:00

Anwil Włocławek (Poland)	77–70	(Spain) Pamesa Valencia
Scoring by quarter: 23–17, 22–19, 14–20, 18–14

Włocławek

8 January
19:30

D. Bank Skyliners (Germany)	67–72	(Russia) Khimki
Scoring by quarter: 21–15, 12–18, 17–20, 17–19

Frankfurt

=== Game 9 ===
15 January 2008

15 January
17:00

Azovmash Mariupol (Ukraine)	73–74	(Spain) Pamesa Valencia
Scoring by quarter: 16–20, 18–29, 12–10, 27–15

Mariupol

15 January
17:00

Khimki (Russia)	90–63	(Poland) Anwil Włocławek
Scoring by quarter: 22–26, 20–10, 26–12, 22–15

Khimki

15 January
20:00

Nancy (France)	84–78	(Germany) D. Bank Skyliners
Scoring by quarter: 30–19, 20–25, 21–16, 13–18

Nancy

=== Game 10 ===
22 January 2008

22 January
19:30

D. Bank Skyliners (Germany)	63–72	(Ukraine) Azovmash Mariupol
Scoring by quarter: 15–16, 20–15, 12–24, 16–17

Frankfurt

22 January
19:30

Pamesa Valencia (Spain)	63–60	(Russia) Khimki
Scoring by quarter: 10–22, 13–13, 25–6, 15–19

Valencia

22 January
19:30

Anwil Włocławek (Poland)	85–63	(France) Nancy
Scoring by quarter: 17–13, 14–13, 22–18, 32–19

Włocławek
