= Mahir Agva =

German basketball player (born 1996)

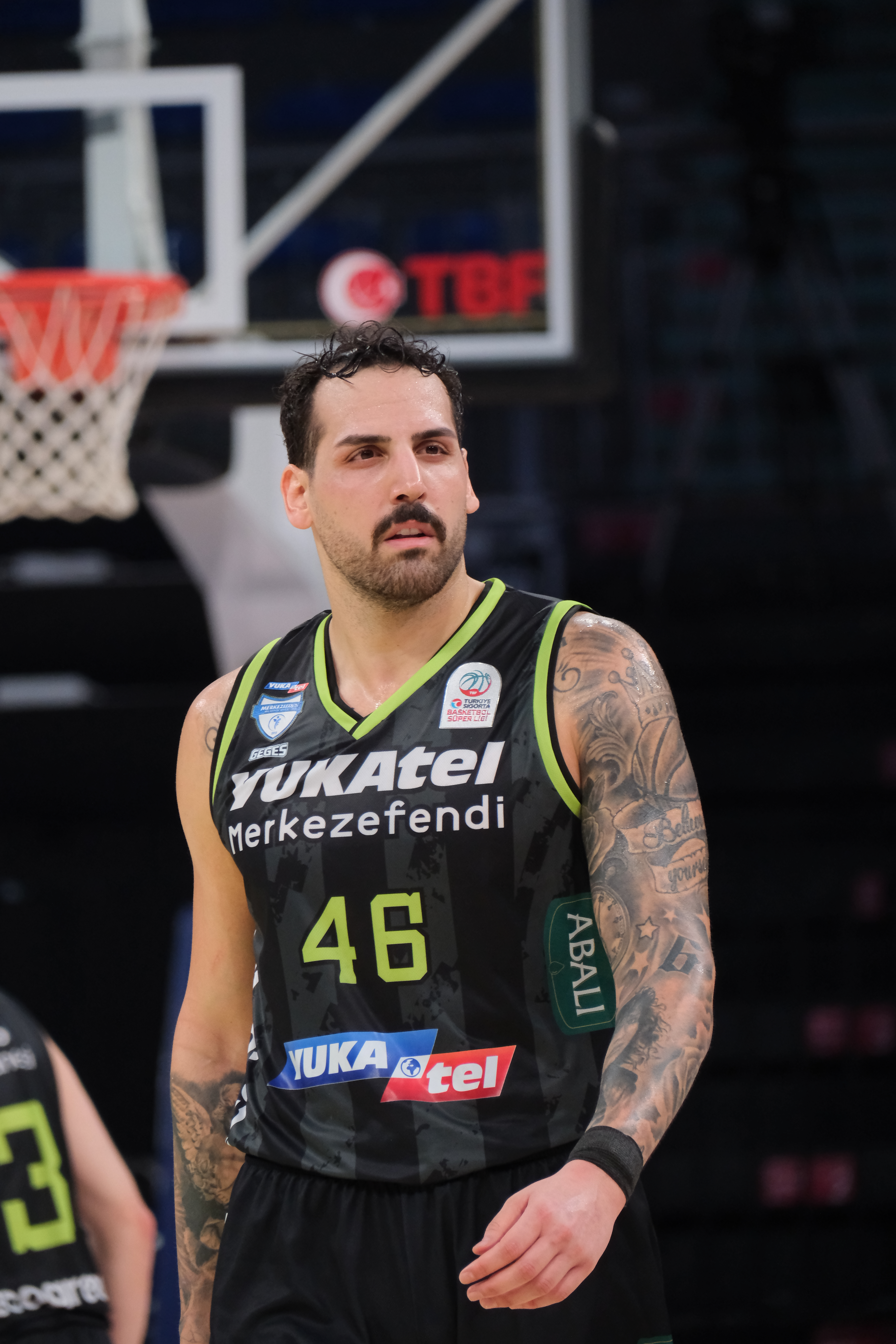
- Agva with Denizli Basket in 2026

No. 46 – Yukatel Denizli Basket
- Position: Center
- League: Basketbol Süper Ligi

Personal information
- Born: 26 June 1996 (age 30) Reutlingen, Germany
- Listed height: 6 ft 9 in (2.06 m)
- Listed weight: 242 lb (110 kg)

Career information
- Playing career: 2013–present

Career history
- 2013–2016: Tigers Tübingen
- 2014–2015: → Ehingen Urspring
- 2016–2017: Frankfurt Skyliners
- 2017–2019: Gießen 46ers
- 2019–2020: Darüşşafaka
- 2020–2022: Pınar Karşıyaka
- 2022–2023: Galatasaray Nef
- 2023–2024: Petkim Spor
- 2024–2025: Türk Telekom
- 2025–present: Denizli Basket

Mahir Agva (Turkish: Ağva; born 26 June 1996) is a Turkish-German professional basketball player for Yukatel Denizli Basket of the Basketbol Süper Ligi (BSL). Standing at 6 ft 9 in (2.06 m), he plays at the center position.

== Professional career ==
Mahir Agva played basketball professionally in Germany for seven seasons. After spending the first years of his career between the ProA and the Basketball Bundesliga, he consistently played in the Basketball Bundesliga for three seasons between 2016 and 2019. In these seven years he played for clubs such as Tigers Tübingen, Ehingen Urspring, the Frankfurt Skyliners and the Gießen 46ers.

=== Darüşşafaka ===
On 11 July 2019, Agva signed with Darüşşafaka of the Basketbol Süper Ligi (BSL).

=== Pınar Karşıyaka ===
On 20 August 2020, Agva signed a two-year deal with Pınar Karşıyaka of the Basketbol Süper Ligi (BSL).

=== Galatasaray Nef ===
On 26 June 2022, he has signed with Galatasaray Nef of the Turkish Basketbol Süper Ligi (BSL). On 11 July 2023, a message of thanks was published by Galatasaray Nef and it was announced that the roads were separated.

=== Petkim Spor ===
On 11 July 2023, he signed with Petkim Spor of the Basketbol Süper Ligi (BSL).

=== Türk Telekom ===
On 11 June 2024, he signed with Türk Telekom of the Turkish Basketbol Süper Ligi (BSL).

=== Denizli Basket ===
On 2 August 2025, he signed with Denizli Basket of the Basketbol Süper Ligi (BSL).
