= 2008–09 Galatasaray S.K. (wheelchair basketball) season =

Galatasaray SK
2008–09 season
- Chairman: (Turkey) Ünal Aysal
- Manager: (Turkey) Sedat İncesu
- Turkish Wheelchair Basketball Super League: 1st
- IWBF Champions Cup: Winner
- Kitakyushu Champions Cup: Winner

Galatasaray SK Wheelchair Basketball 2008–2009 season is the 2008–2009 basketball season for Turkish professional basketball club Galatasaray SK.

The club competes in:

- IWBF Champions Cup : Winner
- Kitakyushu Champions Cup : Winner
- Turkish Wheelchair Basketball Super League : Winner

== 2008–09 roster ==
Number	Player	Position
6	(United States) Matthew David Scott	Forward
7	(Turkey) Fikri Gündoğdu	Forward
10	(Turkey) İsmail Ar	Forward
20	(Turkey) Şuayip Kablan	Forward
21	(Turkey) Serdar Antaç	Center
1	(Czech Republic) Petr Tuček	Center
2	(Turkey) Selim Demirdağ	Center
3	(Turkey) Selim Sayak	Guard
4	(Iraq) (Sweden) Hussein Haidari	Forward
5	(Australia) Justin Eveson	Center
5	(Turkey) Ferit Gümüş	Center
5	(Australia) Troy Sachs	Center
5	(Turkey) Seyran Orman Kurt	Center

== Squad changes for the 2008–2009 season ==
In: Note: Flags indicate national team as defined under FIFA eligibility rules; some limited exceptions apply. Players may hold more than one non-FIFA nationality.

No.	Pos.	Nation	Player
-		USA	Matt Scott (from)
-		AUS	Troy Sachs (from)
-		TUR	Fikri Gündoğdu (from)
-		TUR	Şuayip Kablan (from)
-		TUR	Serdar Antaç (from)

Out: Note: Flags indicate national team as defined under FIFA eligibility rules; some limited exceptions apply. Players may hold more than one non-FIFA nationality.

No.	Pos.	Nation	Player
6		TUR	Abdülgazi Kahraman (to)
4		TUR	Özgür Gürbulak (to)
7		TUR	Ahmet Mencik (to)
20		TUR	Ali Asker Turan (to)
21		TUR	Eyüp Atırcıoğlu (to)

== Results, schedules and standings ==
=== Turkish Wheelchair Basketball Super League 2008–09 ===
==== Regular season ====
First Half

December 21, 2008
14:00

(Report)

Galatasaray	72–55	Engelli Yıldızlar
Scoring by quarter: 24–14, 10–10, 19–18, 19–13
Pts: Matthew David Scott 15, Ferit Gümüş 13, H.Haidari 13, Petr Tucek 21		Pts: -

Ahmet Cömert Spor Salonu, Istanbul
Attendance: unknown

December 27, 2008
15:30

(Report)

Beşiktaş	72–90	Galatasaray
Scoring by quarter: 10–24, 28–43, 55–63, 72–90
Pts: -		Pts: Ferit Gümüş 20, Matthew David Scott 30, Şuayip Kablan 20

Süleyman Seba Spor Salonu, Istanbul
Attendance: unknown

January 4, 2009
11:00

(Report)

Galatasaray	98–32	İskenderun Engelliler
Scoring by quarter: 29–6, 29–12, 20–4, 20–10
Pts: Matthew David Scott 15, Selim Sayak 13, Şuayip Kablan 15, İsmail Ar 13		Pts: -

Ahmet Cömert Spor Salonu, Istanbul
Attendance: unknown

January 11, 2009
12:00

(Report)

Galatasaray	69–57	Saran Anadolu
Scoring by quarter: 18–12, 12–14, 13–18, 16–25
Pts: Petr Tucek 22, Ferit Gümüş 20, Troy Sachs 15		Pts: -

Ahmet Cömert Spor Salonu, Istanbul
Attendance: unknown

January 18, 2009
12:00

(Report)

Galatasaray	86–44	İzmir BŞB
Scoring by quarter: 23–8, 18–16, 27–8, 18–12
Pts: Matthew David Scott 13, Petr Tucek 25, Ferit Gümüş 22, Şuayip Kablan 13		Pts: -

Bağcılar Spor Salonu, Istanbul
Attendance: unknown

January 25, 2009
13:00

(Report)

Lefkoşa Belediyesi	29–83	Galatasaray
Scoring by quarter: 4–24, 7–14, 6–23, 12–22
Pts: -		Pts: Matthew David Scott 37, Ferit Gümüş 25

N/A, KKTC
Attendance: unknown

Second Half

March 1, 2009
14:00

(Report)

Galatasaray	69–55	Saran Anadolu
Scoring by quarter: 16–16, 21–9, 12–17, 21–13
Pts: Petr Tucek 38, Ferit Gümüş 14, Matthew David Scott 12		Pts: -

Ahmet Cömert Spor Salonu, Istanbul
Attendance: unknown

March 8, 2009
13:00

(Report)

İzmir BŞB	54–82	Galatasaray
Scoring by quarter: 22–25, 7–17, 10–24, 15–16
Pts: -		Pts: Petr Tucek 26, Ferit Gümüş 22, Matthew David Scott 29

Evka-4 Spor Salonu, İzmir
Attendance: unknown

March 22, 2009
15:00

(Report)

Ordu Engelliler	37–93	Galatasaray
Scoring by quarter: 10–32, 8–20, 11–13, 8–28
Pts: -		Pts: Petr Tucek 19, Ferit Gümüş 12, Matthew David Scott 38

Bağcılar Spor Salonu, İzmir
Attendance: unknown

April 4, 2009
11:00

(Report)

Galatasaray	79–68	Kardemir Karabük
Scoring by quarter: 19–16, 24–13, 12–22, 24–17
Pts: Justin Eveson 15, Ferit Gümüş 35, Troy Sachs 10		Pts: -

Ahmet Cömert Spor Salonu, Istanbul
Attendance: unknown

April 5, 2009
11:00

(Report)

Galatasaray	78–55	Kardemir Karabük
Scoring by quarter: 28–14, 19–15, 7–14, 24–15
Pts: Justin Eveson 16, Ferit Gümüş 22, Troy Sachs 13		Pts: -

Ahmet Cömert Spor Salonu, Istanbul
Attendance: unknown

April 13, 2009
16:00

(Report)

Adana Engelliler	46–83	Galatasaray
Scoring by quarter: 9–17, 8–24, 14–18, 15–14
Pts: -		Pts: Justin Eveson 16, Ferit Gümüş 13, Selim Sayak 13

Yüreğir Spor Salonu, Adana
Attendance: unknown

April 15, 2009
16:00

(Report)

Adana Engelliler	51–81	Galatasaray
Scoring by quarter: 14–27, 15–15, 15–15, 7–24
Pts: -		Pts: Justin Eveson 22, Ferit Gümüş 21, Troy Sachs 24

Yüreğir Spor Salonu, Adana
Attendance: unknown

April 19, 2009
11:00

(Report)

Cadbury Kent İstanbul Engelli Yıldızlar	58–82	Galatasaray
Scoring by quarter: 5–29, 12–18, 17–16, 24–19
Pts: -		Pts: Justin Eveson 34, Ferit Gümüş 24, Troy Sachs 14

Bağcılar Spor Salonu, Istanbul
Attendance: unknown

April 24, 2009
11:00

(Report)

Galatasaray	91–46	Lefkoşa Belediyesi
Pts: Justin Eveson 12, Ferit Gümüş 12, Troy Sachs 28		Pts: -

Ahmet Cömert Spor Salonu, Istanbul
Attendance: unknown

April 26, 2009
11:00

(Report)

Galatasaray	82–68	Ordu Engelliler
Scoring by quarter: 28–10, 16–16, 20–24, 23–14
Pts: Matthew David Scott 28, Justin Eveson 21, Troy Sachs 16		Pts: -

Ahmet Cömert Spor Salonu, Istanbul
Attendance: unknown

June 24, 2009
19:00

(Report)

Galatasaray	80–66	Beşiktaş
Scoring by quarter: 29–17, 20–12, 13–21, 18–16

Ahmet Cömert Sapor Salonu, Istanbul
Attendance: unknown

=== IWBF Champions Cup ===
May 1, 2009
13:30

(Report)

Galatasaray	81–72	CD Once Andalucia
Scoring by quarter: 19–12, 23–22, 21–14, 18–24
Pts: Justin Eveson 20, Ferit Gümüş 11, Petr Tucek 38		Pts: -

Wetzler, Germany
Attendance: unknown

May 1, 2009
18:00

(Report)

Galatasaray	75–57	CS Meaux (WBC)
Scoring by quarter: 13–11, 19–17, 17–14, 26–15
Pts: Justin Eveson 23, Petr Tucek 29		Pts: -

Wetzler, Germany
Attendance: unknown

May 2, 2009
9:30

(Report)

Galatasaray	60–72	RSC Rollis Zwickau
Scoring by quarter: 12–21, 12–18, 18–18, 18–15
Pts: Justin Eveson 17, Petr Tucek 15, Troy Sachs 10		Pts: -

Wetzler, Germany
Attendance: unknown

Semi Final

May 2, 2009
18:00

(Report)

Galatasaray	87–54	Lottomatica Elecom Sports
Scoring by quarter: 25–13, 18–15, 19–14, 25–12
Pts: Justin Eveson 29, Petr Tucek 22, Selim Sayak 13		Pts: -

Wetzler, Germany
Attendance: unknown

FINAL

May 3, 2009
14:45

(Report)

Galatasaray	82–73	RSC Rollis Zwickau
Scoring by quarter: 21–19, 21–20, 7–16, 24–27
Pts: Justin Eveson 22, Petr Tucek 28		Pts: -

Wetzler, Germany
Attendance: unknown

=== Kitakyushu Champions Cup 2009 ===
October 23, 2009
13:00

(Report)

Galatasaray	90–31	Diablos WCB Team
Pts: Ferit Gümüş 12, Dothan Meishar 22, Petr Tucek 21		Pts: -

Kitakyushu, Japan
Attendance: unknown

October 24, 2009
11:00

(Report)

Galatasaray	85–55	Mungwungwa Electronics
Scoring by quarter: 19–13, 30–12, 24–10, 18–14
Pts: Ferit Gümüş 14, Petr Tucek 26		Pts: -

Kitakyushu, Japan
Attendance: unknown

October 25, 2009
9:30

(Report)

Galatasaray	83–58	Miyagi Max

Kitakyushu, Japan
Attendance: unknown

FINAL

October 25, 2009
18:00

(Report)

Galatasaray	68–43	Mungwungwa Electronics
Scoring by quarter: 14–10, 20–7, 22–10, 12–16
Pts: Ferit Gümüş 20, Petr Tucek 26		Pts: -

Kitakyushu, Japan
Attendance: unknown
