= Remzi Sedat İncesu =

Turkish basketball coach (born 1972)

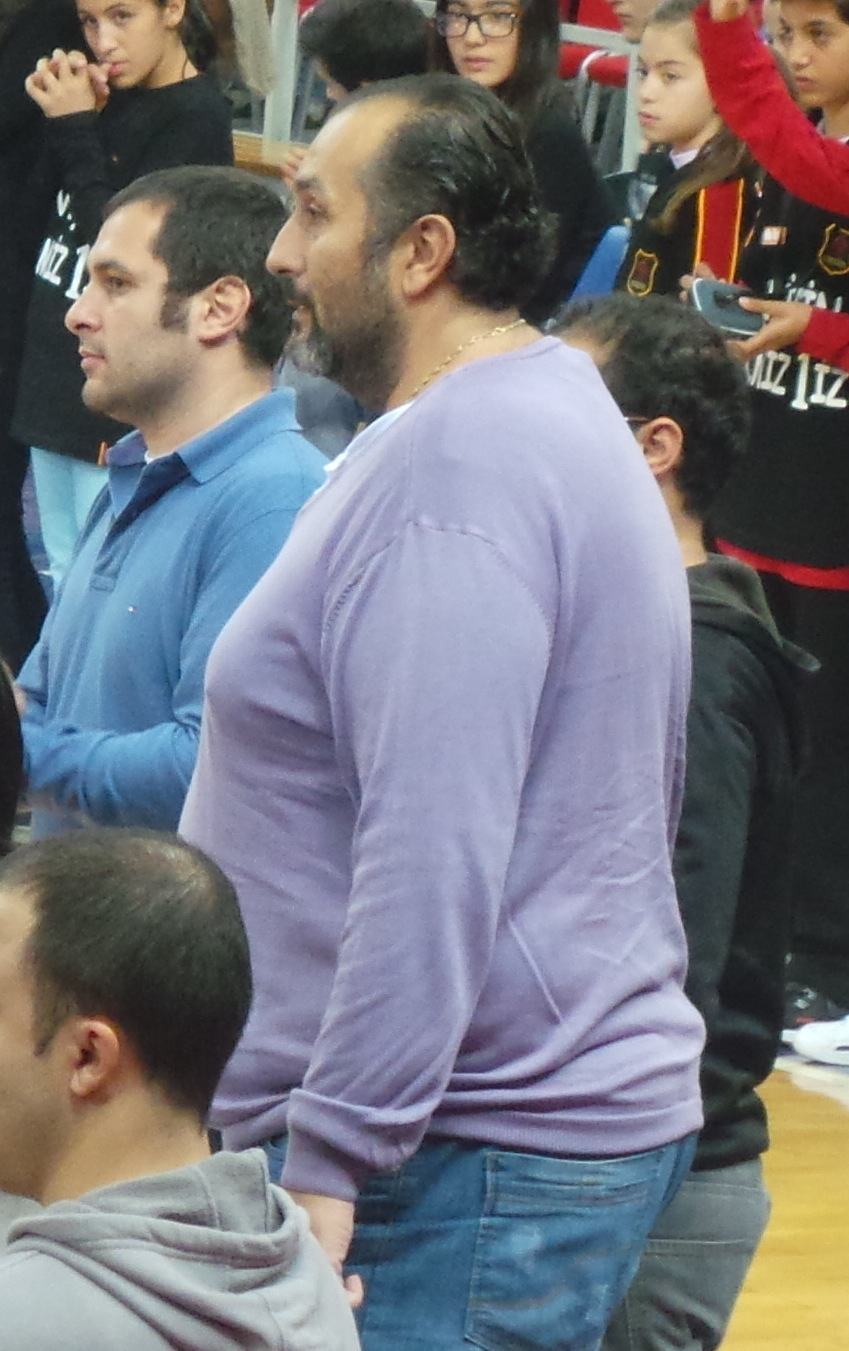

Personal information
- Full name: Remzi Sedat İncesu
- Nationality: Turkey
- Born: July 11, 1972 (age 53)

Sport
- Country: Kayseri, Turkey
- Sport: Basketball
- Club: Efes Pilsen (?-?); TED Kolejliler (?-?); Ankara Büyük Kolej (?-?)
- Turned pro: 1985
- Retired: 1994
- Now coaching: Turkey (2004-present); Galatasaray (2005-2025)

Remzi Sedat İncesu (born 11 July 1972 Kayseri, Turkey) is a Turkish professional basketball coach. He is currently coaching the Turkish pro side Galatasaray Wheelchair Basketball Team.

== Honours ==
=== Domestic competitions ===
- Turkish Wheelchair Basketball Super League:
  - Winners (9): (record) 2006–07, 2007–08, 2008–09, 2009–10, 2010-11, 2011-12, 2012-13, 2013-14, 2014-15
- Turkish Wheelchair Basketball First League:
  - Winners (1): 2005-06
- Sinan Erdem Wheelchair Basketball Cup:
  - Winners (2): 2006, 2008
- Antalya Kepez Tournament:
  - Winners (1): 2005

=== International competitions ===
- IWBF Champions Cup:
  - Winners (5): 2008, 2009, 2011, 2013, 2014
  - Finalist (1): 2012
- Kitakyushu Champions Cup:
  - Winners (4): 2008, 2009, 2011, 2012
- André Vergauwen Cup:
  - Semi-finalists(1): 2007
- Chieti Tournament:
  - Winners (1): 2007
- South Eastern Europe (SEE) Championship Cup:
  - Winners (1): 2006
