= 2022–23 Galatasaray S.K. (wheelchair basketball) season =

Turkish basketball season

Galatasaray Tunç Holding
2022–23 season
- President: Dursun Özbek
- Head coach: Remzi Sedat İncesu
- Arena: Bahçelievler Engelliler Spor Salonu
- Turkish Wheelchair Basketball Super League: 2th seed
- Playoffs: 3rd
- IWBF Champions Cup: Quarterfinals
- IWBF EuroCup 1: 5th

2022–23 Galatasaray SK Wheelchair Basketball Season is the 2022–2023 basketball season for Turkish professional basketball club Galatasaray.

== Overview ==
=== February ===
- Due to the earthquake disaster on 6 February 2023, it was announced that all national sports organizations in the Republic of Turkey were stopped until further notice.

=== April ===
- In the notification made on 4 April 2023, it was announced that the Turkish Wheelchair Basketball Super League will start on 13 April 2023.

== Sponsorship and kit manufacturers ==
- Supplier: Umbro
- Name sponsor: Tunç Holding
- Main sponsor: Tunç Holding
- Back sponsor: —
- Sleeve sponsor: —
- Short sponsor: —
- Socks sponsor: —

== Team ==
=== Players ===
As of 3 December 2022

No.	Nationality	Player	Date of birth and age	Class.	Pos.
1	Poland	Piotr Luszynski	January 1, 1973 (age 52)	4.5	Center
3	Turkey	Cem Gezinci	January 1, 1985 (age 40)	4.5	Forward
5	Turkey	Özgür Gürbulak	April 30, 1981 (age 44)	4.0	Guard
7	Turkey	Başar Koç		1.5	Forward
8	Turkey	Maşide Cesur	August 18, 1990 (age 35)	1.0	Forward
10	Turkey	Enes Bulut	February 7, 2001 (age 24)	4.0	Guard
11	Turkey	Fikri Gündoğdu	November 28, 1985 (age 40)	1.0	Forward
13	Turkey	Serhat Özbudak		2.0	Forward
14	Turkey	Mücahit Günaydın	March 25, 1999 (age 26)	4.0	Forward
28	Turkey	Hüseyin Avni Dalman	March 20, 1994 (age 31)	2.0	Forward
90	Turkey	Buğra Ergun	May 24, 2006 (age 19)	1.5	Forward

=== Squad changes ===
==== In ====
Date	Player	From	Source
8 September 2022	(Turkey) Serhat Özbudak	(Turkey) Yalova Ortopedikler Spor Kulübü	
21 September 2022	(Turkey) Özgür Gürbulak	(Turkey) Gazişehir Gaziantep	
30 September 2022	(Turkey) Cem Gezinci	(Turkey) Beşiktaş	
30 September 2022	(Turkey) Başar Koç	(Turkey) Pendik Belediyesi Engelliler Spor Kulübü	
3 December 2022	(Poland) Piotr Luszynski		

==== Out ====
Date	Player	From	Source
30 August 2022	(Turkey) Deniz Acar	(Turkey) Beşiktaş	
30 August 2022	(Turkey) Zafer Gültekin	(Turkey) Beşiktaş	
21 September 2022	(Turkey) Mustafa Muhittinoğlu	(Turkey) Gazişehir Gaziantep	
30 September 2022	(Turkey) Uğur Toprak	(Germany) Rhine River Rhinos	

=== Staff and management ===
As of 7 September 2022

Name	Job
Remzi Sedat İncesu	Head Coach
Barış Ova	Physiotherapist
Akın Göl	Mechanician

== Competitions ==
=== Overview ===
Competition	First match	Last match	Starting round	Final position	Record							
Competition	First match	Last match	Starting round	Final position	Pld	W	D	L	PF	PA	PD	Win %
2022–23 Turkish Wheelchair Basketball Super League	1 October 2022	8 May 2023	Round 1	2th	26	22	0	4	1,708	1,249	+459	84.62
2022–23 Turkish Wheelchair Basketball Super League Playoffs	9 May 2023	16 May 2023	Quarterfinals	3rd	6	4	0	2	403	371	+32	66.67
2023 IWBF Champions Cup	3 February 2023	12 March 2023	Group Stage	Quarterfinals	7	4	0	3	500	521	−21	57.14
2023 IWBF EuroCup 1	28 April 2023	29 April 2023	Finals	5th	4	2	0	2	287	277	+10	50.00
Total					43	32	0	11	2,898	2,418	+480	74.42

Last updated: 16 May 2023
Source: Competitions

=== Turkish Wheelchair Basketball Super League ===
==== League table ====
Pos	Team	Pld	W	L	PF	PA	PD	Pts	Qualification or relegation
1	Fenerbahçe Göksel Çelik	26	25	1	1839	1195	+644	51	Qualification to playoffs
2	Galatasaray Tunç Holding	26	22	4	1708	1249	+459	48	Qualification to playoffs
3	İzmir Büyükşehir Belediyesi Gençlik ve Spor Kulübü	26	22	4	1609	1282	+327	48	Qualification to playoffs
4	Beşiktaş	26	22	4	1649	1200	+449	48	Qualification to playoffs
5	Gazişehir Gaziantep	26	18	8	1547	1487	+60	44	Qualification to playoffs
6	Bağcılar Engelliler Gençlik ve Spor Kulübü	26	15	11	1598	1535	+63	41	Qualification to playoffs
7	Balıkesir Büyükşehir Belediyesi	26	12	14	1444	1403	+41	38	Qualification to playoffs
8	Pendik Belediyesi Engelliler Spor Kulübü	26	11	15	1401	1537	−136	37	Qualification to playoffs
9	Ordu Büyükşehir Belediyespor	26	9	17	1365	1706	−341	35	
10	Yalova Ortopedikler Spor Kulübü	26	7	19	1365	1706	−341	33	
11	TSK Rehabilitasyon Merkezi Engelliler Spor Kulübü	26	6	20	1215	1536	−321	32	
12	İskenderun Engelliler Spor Kulübü	25	8	17	953	1101	−148	33	Relegation to TSB League 1
13	Şanlıurfa Büyükşehir Belediyespor	25	3	22	841	1215	−374	28	Relegation to TSB League 1
14	Ceylanpınar Bedensel Engelliler Spor Kulübü	24	0	24	0	480	−480	24	Relegation to TSB League 1

Updated to match(es) played on 9 May 2023. Source: TBESF.org.tr

==== Results summary ====
Overall						Home					Away				
Pld	W	L	PF	PA	PD	W	L	PF	PA	PD	W	L	PF	PA	PD
26	22	4	1708	1249	+459	11	2	885	621	+264	11	2	823	628	+195

Last updated: 8 May 2023.
Source: TBESF.org.tr

==== Results by round ====
Round	1	2	3	4	5	6	7	8	9	10	11	12	13	14	15	16	17	18	19	20	21	22	23	24	25	26
Ground	H	A	H	A	H	A	H	A	H	A	H	A	H	A	H	A	H	A	H	A	H	A	H	A	H	A
Result	W	W	W	W	W	W	W	W	W	W	W	L	W	W	L	L	W	W	W	W	W	W	W	W	L	W
Position	5	3	2	2	2	2	2	2	2	2	2	2	2	2	3	3	3	3	3	3	2	2	2	2	2	2

Updated to match(es) played on 8 May 2023. Source: TBESF.org.tr
A = Away; H = Home; W = Win; L = Loss

==== Matches ====
Win Loss

Note: All times are TRT (UTC+3) as listed by the Turkish Physically Handicapped Sports Federation.

1 October 2022 1	Galatasaray Tunç Holding	88–76	Bağcılar Engelliler Gençlik ve Spor Kulübü	Bahçelievler, Istanbul
12:00 TRT
	Pts: Gürbulak 28	Boxscore; Report	Pts: Yılmaz 28	Arena: Bahçelievler Engelliler Spor Salonu

9 October 2022 2	Beşiktaş	48–71	Galatasaray Tunç Holding	Beşiktaş, Istanbul
17:00 TRT	Scoring by quarter: 14–16, 8–22, 7–16, 19–17
Galatasaray TV	Pts: Gültekin 12	Boxscore; Report	Pts: Gezinci 23	Arena: Süleyman Seba Spor Salonu

15 October 2022 3	Galatasaray Tunç Holding	72–53	İzmir Büyükşehir Belediyesi Gençlik ve Spor Kulübü	Bahçelievler, Istanbul
14:30 TRT	Scoring by quarter: 20–12, 22–15, 17–12, 13–14
Galatasaray TV	Pts: Bulut 32	Boxscore; Report		Arena: Bahçelievler Engelliler Spor Salonu

22 October 2022 4	Balıkesir Büyükşehir Belediyesi	52–69	Galatasaray Tunç Holding	Balıkesir
16:00 TRT
		Boxscore; Report		Arena: Alparslan Türkeş Spor Salonu

29 October 2022 5	Galatasaray Tunç Holding	84–40	Ordu Büyükşehir Belediyespor	Bahçelievler, Istanbul
12:00 TRT	Scoring by quarter: 23–14, 27–6, 20–6, 14–14
Galatasaray TV	Pts: Gürbulak 21	Boxscore; Report		Arena: Bahçelievler Engelliler Spor Salonu

5 November 2022 6	Pendik Belediyesi Engelliler Spor Kulübü	44–56	Galatasaray Tunç Holding	Pendik, Istanbul
13:00 TRT	Scoring by quarter: 11–18, 12–17, 9–12, 12–9
		Boxscore; Report	Pts: Günaydın 14	Arena: Kurtköy Kapalı Spor Salonu

12 November 2022 7	Galatasaray Tunç Holding	82–54	İskenderun Engelliler Spor Kulübü	Bahçelievler, Istanbul
12:00 TRT
	Pts: Bulut 28	Boxscore; Report		Arena: Bahçelievler Engelliler Spor Salonu

19 November 2022 8	Şanlıurfa Büyükşehir Belediyespor	61–72	Galatasaray Tunç Holding	Urfa
13:00 TRT
		Boxscore; Report	Pts: Gezinci 20	Arena: 11 Nisan Spor Salonu

25 November 2022 9	Galatasaray Tunç Holding	20–0	Ceylanpınar Bedensel Engelliler Spor Kulübü	Bahçelievler, Istanbul
14:30 TRT
		Boxscore		Arena: Bahçelievler Engelliler Spor Salonu

3 December 2022 10	TSK Rehabilitasyon Merkezi Engelliler Spor Kulübü	47–63	Galatasaray Tunç Holding	Ankara
14:00 TRT
		Boxscore; Report	Pts: Luszynski 23	Arena: TSK Rehabilitasyon Spor Salonu

13 December 2022 11	Galatasaray Tunç Holding	80–43	Yalova Ortopedikler Spor Kulübü	Bahçelievler, Istanbul
13:00 TRT	Scoring by quarter: 21–7, 12–18, 20–14, 27–18
Galatasaray TV		Boxscore; Report		Arena: Bahçelievler Engelliler Spor Salonu

17 December 2022 12	Fenerbahçe Göksel Çelik	71–64	Galatasaray Tunç Holding	Fatih, Istanbul
14:00 TRT	Scoring by quarter: 15–8, 17–18, 21–15, 18–23
Fenerbahçe TV	Pts: Yüksel 28	Boxscore; Report	Pts: Luszynski 27	Arena: Fatih Spor Kompleksi

24 December 2022 13	Galatasaray Tunç Holding	83–55	Gazişehir Gaziantep	Bahçelievler, Istanbul
12:00 TRT	Scoring by quarter: 20–22, 23–12, 20–10, 20–11
		Boxscore; Report		Arena: Bahçelievler Engelliler Spor Salonu

13 April 2023 14	Bağcılar Engelliler Gençlik ve Spor Kulübü	61–67	Galatasaray Tunç Holding	Yalova
13:00 TRT	Scoring by quarter: 17–19, 14–18, 14–10, 16–20
Galatasaray TV	Pts: Yılmaz 29	Boxscore; Report	Pts: Gürbulak 27	Arena: Yalova 90. Yıl Spor Salonu

14 April 2023 15	Galatasaray Tunç Holding	59–70	Beşiktaş	Yalova
13:00 TRT	Scoring by quarter: 17–12, 17–18, 16–22, 9–18
Galatasaray TV	Pts: Gürbulak 27	Boxscore; Report	Pts: Gültekin 26	Arena: Yalova 90. Yıl Spor Salonu

15 April 2023 16	İzmir Büyükşehir Belediyesi Gençlik ve Spor Kulübü	64–55	Galatasaray Tunç Holding	Yalova
18:30 TRT	Scoring by quarter: 17–23, 11–10, 16–7, 20–15
Galatasaray TV		Boxscore; Report		Arena: Yalova 90. Yıl Spor Salonu

16 April 2023 17	Galatasaray Tunç Holding	89–66	Balıkesir Büyükşehir Belediyesi	Osmangazi, Bursa
11:00 TRT	Scoring by quarter: 19–19, 25–20, 23–14, 22–13
Galatasaray TV		Boxscore; Report		Arena: Bursa Osmangazi Spor Salonu

17 April 2023 18	Ordu Büyükşehir Belediyespor	40–80	Galatasaray Tunç Holding	Yalova
17:00 TRT	Scoring by quarter: 12–18, 14–26, 6–18, 8–18
Galatasaray TV		Boxscore; Report		Arena: Yalova 90. Yıl Spor Salonu

18 April 2023 19	Galatasaray Tunç Holding	79–51	Pendik Belediyesi Engelliler Spor Kulübü	Yalova
12:00 TRT
		Boxscore; Report		Arena: Yalova 90. Yıl Spor Salonu

19 April 2023 20	İskenderun Engelliler Spor Kulübü	0–20	Galatasaray Tunç Holding
		Boxscore

20 April 2023 21	Galatasaray Tunç Holding	20–0	Şanlıurfa Büyükşehir Belediyespor
		Boxscore

4 May 2023 22	Ceylanpınar Bedensel Engelliler Spor Kulübü	0–20	Galatasaray Tunç Holding
		Boxscore

5 May 2023 23	Galatasaray Tunç Holding	63–38	TSK Rehabilitasyon Merkezi Engelliler Spor Kulübü	Yalova
15:30
		Boxscore; Report		Arena: Yalova 90. Yıl Spor Salonu

6 May 2023 24	Yalova Ortopedikler Spor Kulübü	64–105	Galatasaray Tunç Holding	Yalova
17:00
		Boxscore; Report		Arena: Yalova 90. Yıl Spor Salonu

7 May 2023 25	Galatasaray Tunç Holding	66–75	Fenerbahçe Göksel Çelik	Yalova
16:00	Scoring by quarter: 15–20, 15–23, 17–13, 19–19
		Boxscore; Report		Arena: Yalova 90. Yıl Spor Salonu

8 May 2023 26	Gazişehir Gaziantep	76–81	Galatasaray Tunç Holding	Yalova
16:00
		Boxscore; Report		Arena: Yalova 90. Yıl Spor Salonu

==== Playoffs ====
===== Quarterfinals =====
Win Loss

9 May 2023 1	Galatasaray Tunç Holding	79–58 (Series: 1–0)	Balıkesir Büyükşehir Belediyesi	Yalova
18:00
		Boxscore; Report		Arena: Yalova 90. Yıl Spor Salonu

10 May 2023 2	Balıkesir Büyükşehir Belediyesi	66–78 (Series: 0–2)	Galatasaray Tunç Holding	Orhangazi, Bursa
15:00
		Boxscore; Report		Arena: Orhangazi Spor Salonu

===== Semifinals =====
Win Loss

11 May 2023 1	Galatasaray Tunç Holding	62–73 (Series: 0–1)	İzmir Büyükşehir Belediyesi Gençlik ve Spor Kulübü	Orhangazi, Bursa
15:00
		Boxscore; Report		Arena: Orhangazi Spor Salonu

12 May 2023 2	İzmir Büyükşehir Belediyesi Gençlik ve Spor Kulübü	55–62 (Series: 1–1)	Galatasaray Tunç Holding	Yalova
18:00
		Boxscore; Report		Arena: Yalova 90. Yıl Spor Salonu

13 May 2023 3	Galatasaray Tunç Holding	45–61 (Series: 1–2)	İzmir Büyükşehir Belediyesi Gençlik ve Spor Kulübü	Yalova
15:00
		Boxscore; Report		Arena: Yalova 90. Yıl Spor Salonu

===== 3–4th place =====
Win Loss

16 May 2023 1	Galatasaray Tunç Holding	77–58	Beşiktaş	Beylikdüzü, Istanbul
14:00
		Boxscore; Report		Arena: Beylikdüzü Spor Kompleksi

=== IWBF Champions Cup ===
==== Group matches (Group A) ====
Key to colors
Top two places in each group advance to quarter-finals
Eliminated from contention

	Team	Pld	W	L	PF	PA	Diff	Pts
1.	(Spain) Bidaideak Bilbao BSR	4	4	0	322	270	52	8
2.	(Turkey) Galatasaray Tunç Holding	4	3	1	305	302	3	7
3.	(France) Hornets Le Cannet	4	2	2	297	251	46	6
4.	(Italy) DECO Metalferro Amicacci Abruzzo	4	1	3	250	289	−39	5
5.	(England) Manchester Revolution	4	0	4	264	326	−62	4

Last updated: 4 February 2023.
Source: IWBF

===== Matches =====
Win Loss

3 February 2023 1	Hornets Le Cannet (France)	62–75	(Turkey) Galatasaray Tunç Holding	Bilbao, Spain
13:30 (15:30 TRT)	Scoring by quarter: 18–14, 24–16, 8–19, 12–26
Galatasaray TV	Pts: Martinez-Toscano 17; Rebs: Carlier 6 Asts: Carlier 7	Boxscore; Report	Pts: Bulut 29; Rebs: Gezinci 15; Asts: Bulut, Luszynski 8	Arena: CCA court Attendance: 200; Referees: Carsten Rehling, Clara Baquero, Yaniv Hadad

3 February 2023 2	Galatasaray Tunç Holding (Turkey)	63–89	(Spain) Bidaideak Bilbao BSR	Bilbao, Spain
18:00 (20:00 TRT)	Scoring by quarter: 17–23, 15–24, 9–19, 22–23
Galatasaray TV	Pts: Luszynski 20; Rebs: Gezinci 8 Asts: Bulut 8	Boxscore; Report	Pts: Papi 46; Rebs: García, Avendaño 7 Asts: García 12	Arena: CCA court Referees: Yaniv Hadad, Kostas Athanasopoulos, Carsten Rehling

4 February 2023 3	Galatasaray Tunç Holding (Turkey)	83–71	(Italy) DECO Metalferro Amicacci Abruzzo	Bilbao, Spain
09:00 (11:00 TRT)	Scoring by quarter: 23–12, 19–20, 22–13, 19–26
Galatasaray TV	Pts: Luszynski 31; Rebs: Luszynski 8 Asts: Gürbulak 9	Boxscore; Report	Pts: Cavagnini 28; Rebs: Cavagnini 14; Asts: Vigoda 14	Arena: CCA court Referees: Clara Baquero, Kostas Athanasopoulos, Linas Radykas

4 February 2023 4	Manchester Revolution (England)	80–84(OT)	(Turkey) Galatasaray Tunç Holding	Bilbao, Spain
13:30 (15:30 TRT)	Scoring by quarter: 14–20, 17–17, 21–18, 18–15, Overtime: 10–14
	Pts: Edwards 30; Rebs: Edwards 6 Asts: Edwards 8	Boxscore; Report	Pts: Luszynski 25; Rebs: Luszynski 14; Asts: Gürbulak 9	Arena: CCA court Referees: Yaniv Hadad, Kostas Athanasopoulos, Clara Baquero

==== Quarter-finals (Group B) ====
Key to colors
Top two places in each group advance to semi-finals
Eliminated from contention

	Team	Pld	W	L	PF	PA	Diff	Pts
1.	(Spain) BSR Amiab Albacete	3	3	0	240	156	84	6
2.	(Germany) RSV Lahn-Dill	3	2	1	195	181	14	5
3.	(Turkey) Galatasaray Tunç Holding	3	1	2	195	219	−24	4
4.	(Spain) Econy Gran Canaria	3	0	3	155	229	−74	3

Last updated: 13 March 2023.
Source: IWBF

===== Matches =====
Win Loss

10 March 2023 1	RSV Lahn-Dill (Germany)	63–58	(Turkey) Galatasaray Tunç Holding	Albacete, Spain
16:30 (18:30 TRT)	Scoring by quarter: 12–8, 16–13, 15–22, 20–15
	Pts: Fujimoto 24; Rebs: Güntner, Böhme 9 Asts: Böhme 6	Boxscore; Report	Pts: Bulut 23; Rebs: Gezinci 9 Asts: Bulut, Gürbulak 7	Arena: B Court; Referees: Avi Kroparo, Kostas Athanasopoulos, Juan Uruñuela

11 March 2023 2	Galatasaray Tunç Holding (Turkey)	55–86	(Spain) BSR Amiab Albacete	Albacete, Spain
19:00 (21:00 TRT)	Scoring by quarter: 16–20, 12–19, 15–19, 12–28
	Pts: Bulut 24; Rebs: Günaydın 8 Asts: Bulut 7	Boxscore	Pts: Filipski 33; Rebs: Manning 7 Asts: Pratt 16	Arena: B Court; Referees: Drazen Strok, Kostas Athanasopoulos, Milutin Jelenic

12 March 2023 3	Galatasaray Tunç Holding (Turkey)	82–70	(Spain) Econy Gran Canaria	Albacete, Spain
10:00 (12:00 TRT)	Scoring by quarter: 21–26, 22–13, 21–10, 18–21
	Pts: Gürbulak 24; Rebs: Gezinci 13; Asts: Bulut 10	Boxscore; Report	Pts: Salazar 27; Rebs: Ramonet 8 Asts: Ramonet 7	Arena: B Court; Referees: Kostas Athanasopoulos, Milutin Jelenic, Avi Kroparo

=== IWBF EuroCup 1 ===
==== Group matches (Group A) ====
Key to colors
Top two places in each group advance to semi-finals
Eliminated from contention

	Team	Pld	W	L	PF	PA	Diff	Pts
1.	(Italy) ASD S. Stefano Sport	3	2	1	195	170	25	5
2.	(Italy) Self Group Millennium Basket	3	2	1	197	202	−5	5
3.	(Turkey) Galatasaray Tunç Holding	3	1	2	201	220	−19	4
4.	(France) Hornets Le Cannet	3	1	2	216	217	−1	4

Last updated: 29 April 2023.
Source: IWBF

===== Matches =====
Win Loss

28 April 2023 1	Hornets Le Cannet (France)	83–89	(Turkey) Galatasaray Tunç Holding	Cantù, Italy
13:30 (14:30 TRT)	Scoring by quarter: 20–14, 18–29, 15–15, 30–31
Galatasaray TV	Pts: Carlier 21; Rebs: Carlier 8 Asts: Belaïd 8	Boxscore; Report	Pts: Łuszyński 32; Rebs: Gezinci 9 Asts: Łuszyński, Gezinci 4	Arena: EuroCup 1 Final Court 1 Referees: Maurizio Zamponi, Patricia Diez Cabaleiro, Milan Stojančević

28 April 2023 2	Galatasaray Tunç Holding (Turkey)	53–63	(Italy) Self Group Millennium Basket	Cantù, Italy
18:00 (19:00 TRT)	Scoring by quarter: 12–18, 20–11, 13–17, 8–17
Galatasaray TV	Pts: Gezinci 13; Rebs: Gezinci 14; Asts: Bulut 8	Boxscore; Report	Pts: Boughania 19; Rebs: Casagrande 8 Asts: Boughania 8	Arena: EuroCup 1 Final Court 2 Referees: Milan Stojančević, Carsten Rehling, Dino Duraković

29 April 2023 3	ASD S. Stefano Sport (Italy)	74–59	(Turkey) Galatasaray Tunç Holding	Cantù, Italy
09:30 (10:30 TRT)	Scoring by quarter: 14–12, 20–19, 28–14, 12–14
Galatasaray TV	Pts: Giaretti 32; Rebs: Bedzeti 16; Asts: Bedzeti 10	Boxscore; Report	Pts: Bulut 13; Rebs: Gezinci 15; Asts: Gürbulak 6	Arena: EuroCup 1 Final Court 2

==== 5–6th place ====
29 April 2023	Galatasaray Tunç Holding (Turkey)	86–57	(France) CTH de Lannion	Cantù, Italy
15:15 (16:15 TRT)	Scoring by quarter: 20–17, 24–9, 20–17, 22–14
	Pts: Łuszyński 31; Rebs: Gürbulak 8 Asts: Gürbulak 5	Boxscore; Report	Pts: Etavard 23; Rebs: three player 5 Asts: Patterson 5	Arena: EuroCup 1 Final Court 1 Referees: Carsten Rehling, Patricia Diez Cabaleiro, Pandora Wesołowska
