= 2011–12 Galatasaray S.K. (wheelchair basketball) season =

Galatasaray SK
2011–12 season
- Chairman: (Turkey) Ünal Aysal
- Manager: (Turkey) Sedat İncesu
- Kitakyushu Champions Cup: Winner

Galatasaray SK Wheelchair Basketball 2011–2012 season is the 2011–2012 basketball season for Turkish professional basketball club Galatasaray SK.

The club competes in:

- IWBF Champions Cup
- Kitakyushu Champions Cup
- Turkish Wheelchair Basketball Super League

== Current roster ==
Number	Player	Position
9	(United States) Matthew David Scott	Forward
11	(Turkey) Fikri Gündoğdu	Forward
10	(Turkey) İsmail Ar	Forward
14	(Turkey) Murat Yazıcı	Forward
4	(Australia) Tristan Knowles	Center
5	(Turkey) Özgür Gürbulak	Forward
15	(Poland) Mateusz Filipski	Center
6	(Poland) Piotr Luszynski	Center
13	(Turkey) Ferit Gümüş	Forward
12	(Turkey) Umut Ünar	Forward
7	(Turkey) Ali Asker Turan	Guard

== Squad changes for the 2011–2012 season ==
In: Note: Flags indicate national team as defined under FIFA eligibility rules; some limited exceptions apply. Players may hold more than one non-FIFA nationality.

No.	Pos.	Nation	Player
-		AUS	Tristan Knowles (from Fundación Grupo Norte Valladolid)
-		POL	Piotr Luszynski (from SC Rollis Zwickau)
-		TUR	Ferit Gümüş (from Beşiktaş)
-		TUR	Umut Ünar (from Engelli Yıldızlar)
-		TUR	Ali Asker Turan (from KKTC Turkcell)

Out: Note: Flags indicate national team as defined under FIFA eligibility rules; some limited exceptions apply. Players may hold more than one non-FIFA nationality.

No.	Pos.	Nation	Player
8		AUS	Petr Tucek (to CD Fundosa Grupo)
7		USA	Jaime Luis Mazzi (to)
3		TUR	Volkan Aydeniz (to Bornova Barışgücü)
21		TUR	Ramazan Kahraman (to Bornova Barışgücü)
2		TUR	Ömer Gürkan (to CD Fundosa Grupo)

== Results, schedules and standings ==
=== Preseason games ===
October 13, 2011
19:00

(Report)

Galatasaray	101–29	Kinki

Kitakyushu, Japan
Attendance: unknown

=== Kitakyushu Champions Cup 2011 ===
Galatasaray won the Kitakyushu Champions Cup.

October 14, 2011
19:00

(Report)

Galatasaray	108–43	Perth Wheelcats
Scoring by quarter: 36–9, 25–11, 25–16, 22–11
Pts: Matt Scott 22, Luszynski 20, Özgür 14, Filipski 13, Ferit, Knowles 12		Pts: -

Kitakyushu, Japan
Attendance: unknown

October 15, 2011
10:00

(Report)

Galatasaray	85–58	Miyagi Max
Scoring by quarter: 21–12, 24–19, 14–13, 26–14
Pts: Özgür Gürbulak 20, Matt Scott 20, İsmail Ar 16, Knowles 13		Pts: -

Kitakyushu, Japan
Attendance: unknown

October 16, 2011
3:00

[ (Report)]

Galatasaray	95–49	Seul MG
Scoring by quarter: 0–0, 0–0, 0–0, 0–0
Pts: - Rebs: - Asts: -		Pts: - Rebs: - Asts: -

Kitakyushu, Japan
Attendance: unknown

FINAL

October 16, 2011
10:00

(Report)

Galatasaray	68–51	Miyagi Max
Scoring by quarter: 14–11, 15–17, 26–12, 13–11
Pts: Özgür Gürbulak 22, Piotr Luzynski 14, İsmail Ar 12; Rebs: - Asts: -		Pts: - Rebs: - Asts: -

Kitakyushu, Japan
Attendance: unknown

=== Turkish Wheelchair Basketball Super League 2011–12 ===
==== Regular season ====
1st Half

November 20, 2011
12:00

(Report)

Antalya BŞB	33–84	Galatasaray
Scoring by quarter: 7–25, 11–22, 5–25, 10–12
Pts: -		Pts: Tristan Knowles 13, Özgür Gürbulak 11, Piotr Luszynski 20, Ferit Gümüş 12, Mateusz Filipski 19

Dilek Sabancı Spor Salonu, Antalya
Attendance: unknown

November 27, 2011
12:00

(Report)

Galatasaray	74–68	Beşiktaş Wheelchair Basketball Team
Scoring by quarter: 12–16, 22–14, 22–18, 18–20
Pts: Ferit Gümüş 27, Özgür Gürbulak, Piotr Luszynski 12, Mateusz Filipski 10		Pts: -

Ahmet Cömert Spor Salonu, Istanbul
Attendance: unknown

December 4, 2011
13:30

(Report)

Galatasaray	111–26	Şanlıurfa Engelliler
Scoring by quarter: 23–8, 27–10, 31–4, 30–4
Pts: Tristan Knowles 16, Özgür Gürbulak 18, Ali Asker Turan 15, Matt Scott 16, İsmail Ar 10, Mateusz Filipski 26		Pts: -

Ahmet Cömert Spor Salonu, Istanbul
Attendance: unknown

December 11, 2011
12:00

(Report)

Engelli Yıldızlar	24–107	Galatasaray
Scoring by quarter: 5–28, 2–25, 10–32, 7–22
Pts: -		Pts: Tristan Knowles 34, Özgür Gürbulak 19, Piotr Luszynski 19, Ali Asker Turan 12, Ferit Gümüş 10

Ahmet Cömert Spor Salonu, Istanbul
Attendance: unknown

December 18, 2011
11:30

(Report)

Galatasaray	95–72	Kardemir Karabük
Scoring by quarter: 26–20, 27–17, 17–18, 25–17
Pts: Özgür Gürbulak 17, Piotr Luszynski 25, İsmail Ar 16, Mateusz Filipski 14		Pts: -

Ahmet Cömert Spor Salonu, Istanbul
Attendance: unknown
