= 2010–11 Galatasaray S.K. (wheelchair basketball) season =

Galatasaray SK
2010–11 season
- Chairman: (Turkey) Ünal Aysal
- Manager: (Turkey) Sedat İncesu
- Turkish Wheelchair Basketball Super League: 1st
- IWBF Champions Cup: Winner

Galatasaray SK Wheelchair Basketball 2010–2011 season is the 2010–2011 basketball season for Turkish professional basketball club Galatasaray SK.

The club competes in:

- IWBF Champions Cup :Winner
- Kitakyushu Champions Cup
- Turkish Wheelchair Basketball Super League :Winner

== 2010–11 roster ==
| Number | Player | Position |
|---|---|---|
| 6 | (United States) Matthew David Scott | Forward |
| 7 | (Turkey) Fikri Gündoğdu | Forward |
| 10 | (Turkey) İsmail Ar | Forward |
| 20 | (Turkey) Murat Yazıcı | Forward |
| 21 | (Turkey) Ramazan Kahraman | Center |
| 1 | (Czech Republic) Petr Tuček | Center |
| 2 | (Turkey) Ömer Gürkan | Center |
| 3 | (Turkey) Volkan Aydeniz | Guard |
| 4 | (Turkey) Özgür Gürbulak | Forward |
| 5 | (Poland) Mateusz Filipski | Center |
| 5 | (United States) Jaime Luis Mazzi | Center |

== Squad changes for the 2010–2011 season ==
In: Note: Flags indicate national team as defined under FIFA eligibility rules; some limited exceptions apply. Players may hold more than one non-FIFA nationality.

| No. | Pos. | Nation | Player |
|---|---|---|---|
| 5 | | TUR | Özgür Gürbulak (from Saran Anadolu) |
| 6 | | TUR | Volkan Aydeniz (from Saran Anadolu) |
| 15 | | POL | Mateusz Filipski (from SC Rollis Zwickau) |
| 7 | | USA | Jaime Luis Mazzi (from) |

Out: Note: Flags indicate national team as defined under FIFA eligibility rules; some limited exceptions apply. Players may hold more than one non-FIFA nationality.

| No. | Pos. | Nation | Player |
|---|---|---|---|
| - | | AUS | Justin Eveson (to) |
| - | | SWE | Hussein Haidari (to) |
| - | | TUR | Ferit Gümüş (to Beşiktaş) |
| - | | TUR | Selim Sayak (to) |
| - | | ISR | Dotan Meishar (to) |
| - | | TUR | Seyran Orman Kurt (to) |

== Results, schedules and standings ==
=== Turkish Wheelchair Basketball Super League 2010–11 ===
| Pos | Team | Total | | | | | |
|---|---|---|---|---|---|---|---|
| | | Pts | Pld | W | L | F | A |
| 1 | Galatasaray | 36 | 18 | 18 | 0 | 1615 | 854 |
| 2 | Beşiktaş | 34 | 18 | 16 | 2 | 1541 | 1043 |
| 3 | İzmir BŞB | 29 | 18 | 11 | 7 | 1246 | 1153 |
| 4 | KKTC Turkcell | 28 | 18 | 10 | 8 | 1168 | 1282 |
| 5 | Yalova Engelliler | 26 | 18 | 8 | 10 | 1047 | 1119 |
| 6 | Şanlıurfa Engelliler | 26 | 18 | 8 | 10 | 1202 | 1389 |
| 7 | Cadbury Kent Engelli Yıldızlar | 25 | 18 | 7 | 11 | 1101 | 1180 |
| 8 | Kardemir Karabük | 25 | 18 | 7 | 11 | 1156 | 1296 |
| 9 | Adana Engelliler | 23 | 18 | 5 | 13 | 1072 | 1284 |
| 10 | Saran Anadolu | 18 | 18 | 0 | 18 | 798 | 1346 |

Pts=Points, Pld=Matches played, W=Matches won, L=Matches lost, F=Points for, A=Points against

==== Regular season ====
1st Half

November 27, 2010
13:00

(Report)

| Şanlıurfa Engelliler | 50–104 | Galatasaray |
Scoring by quarter: 14–31, 9–24, 14–20, 13–29
| Pts: - | | Pts: Matthew David Scott 41, Mateusz Filipski 20, Özgür Gürbulak 18, Fikri Gündoğdu 15 |

N/A, Şanlıurfa
Attendance: unknown

December 5, 2010
13:00

(Report)

| Galatasaray | 98–49 | Yalova Engelliler |
Scoring by quarter: 22–20, 19–10, 28–7, 29–12
| Pts: Matthew David Scott 25, Özgür Gürbulak 21, Jaime Mazzi 21, Petr Tucek 15 | | Pts: - |

Ahmet Cömert Spor Salonu, Istanbul
Attendance: unknown

December 11, 2010
13:00

(Report)

| KKTC Turkcell | 32–94 | Galatasaray |
Scoring by quarter: 6–24, 9–21, 15–29, 2–20
| Pts: - | | Pts: Matthew David Scott 24, Mateusz Filipski 28, Özgür Gürbulak 20 |

N/A, KKTC
Attendance: unknown

December 19, 2010
13:00

(Report)

| Galatasaray | 98–49 | Kardemir Karabük |
Scoring by quarter: 9–9, 13–14, 33–9, 20–8
| Pts: Mateusz Filipski 19, Özgür Gürbulak 32 | | Pts: - |

Ahmet Cömert Spor Salonu, Istanbul
Attendance: unknown

December 25, 2010
13:00

(Report)

| Adana Engelliler | 37–98 | Galatasaray |
Scoring by quarter: 6–23, 10–27, 10–24, 11–24
| Pts: - | | Pts: İsmail Ar 18, Mateusz Filipski 21, Özgür Gürbulak 22, Petr Tucek 16 |

N/A, Adana
Attendance: unknown

January 9, 2011
13:00

(Report)

| Galatasaray | 99–42 | Cadbury Kent Engelli Yıldızlar |
Scoring by quarter: 19–13, 30–5, 18–20, 32–4
| Pts: Jaime Mazzi 20, Özgür Gürbulak 35, Fikri Gündoğdu 12 | | Pts: - |

Ahmet Cömert Spor Salonu, Istanbul
Attendance: unknown

January 16, 2011
13:00

(Report)

| Saran Anadolu | 48–90 | Galatasaray |
Scoring by quarter: 13–18, 20–30, 9–16, 6–26
| Pts: - | | Pts: Volkan Aydeniz 30, Petr Tucek 20, İsmail Ar 20 |

İTO Spor Salonu, Istanbul
Attendance: unknown

January 19, 2011
19:00

(Report)

| Galatasaray | 92–58 | Beşiktaş |
Scoring by quarter: 23–14, 23–17, 22–15, 24–12
| Pts: Mateusz Filipski 37, Matthew David Scott 28, Özgür Gürbulak 15 | | Pts: - |

Ahmet Cömert Spor Salonu, Istanbul
Attendance: unknown

January 23, 2011
13:00

(Report)

| Galatasaray | 94–53 | İzmir BŞB |
Scoring by quarter: 24–13, 25–11, 21–10, 24–19
| Pts: Mateusz Filipski 31, Matthew David Scott 15, Özgür Gürbulak 18, İsmail Ar 24 | | Pts: - |

Ahmet Cömert Spor Salonu, Istanbul
Attendance: unknown

2nd Half

February 12, 2011
15:30

(Report)

| Beşiktaş | 79–96 | Galatasaray |
Scoring by quarter: 21–20, 20–25, 19–21, 19–30
| Pts: - | | Pts: Mateusz Filipski 22, Matthew David Scott 20, İsmail Ar 16 |

Süleyman Seba Spor Salonu, Istanbul
Attendance: unknown

February 20, 2011
11:00

(Report)

| Galatasaray | 93–34 | Şanlıurfa Engelliler |
Scoring by quarter: 21–2, 28–9, 29–10, 15–13
| Pts: Petr Tucek 22, Fikri Gündoğdu 16, Özgür Gürbulak 11, Jaime Mazzi 14; Rebs: Özgür Gürbulak 11; Asts: Özgür Gürbulak 11 | | Pts: - Rebs: - |

Ahmet Cömert Spor Salonu, Istanbul
Attendance: unknown

February 27, 2011
16:00

(Report)

| Yalova Engelliler | 50–66 | Galatasaray |
Scoring by quarter: 7–13, 13–20, 20–16, 10–17
| Pts: - | | Pts: Petr Tucek 22, Özgür Gürbulak 12, İsmail Ar 21 |

Yalova Atatürk Spor Salonu, Yalova
Attendance: unknown

March 5, 2011
12:00

(Report)

| Galatasaray | 92–34 | KKTC Turkcell |
Scoring by quarter: 24–6, 27–11, 13–13, 28–4
| Pts: Mateusz Filipski 33, Özgür Gürbulak 28, İsmail Ar 14 | | Pts: - |

Ahmet Cömert Spor Salonu, Istanbul
Attendance: unknown

March 20, 2011
15:00

(Report)

| Kardemir Karabük | 54–95 | Galatasaray |
Scoring by quarter: 22–27, 15–18, 10–26, 7–24
| Pts: - | | Pts: Petr Tucek 17, Özgür Gürbulak 32, İsmail Ar 21, M. Filipski 17 |

Karabük Merkez Spor Salonu, Karabük
Attendance: unknown

April 9, 2011
12:00

(Report)

| Galatasaray | 84–45 | Adana Engelliler |
Scoring by quarter: 25–13, 20–9, 22–10, 17–13
| Pts: Mateusz Filipski 42, Özgür Gürbulak 27 | | Pts: - |

Ahmet Cömert Spor Salonu, Istanbul
Attendance: unknown

May 15, 2011
12:00

(Report)

| Galatasaray | 65–37 | Saran Anadolu |
Scoring by quarter: 22–11, 19–9, 8–5, 16–12
| Pts: Petr Tucek 24, Özgür Gürbulak 12 | | Pts: - |

Ahmet Cömert Spor Salonu, Istanbul
Attendance: unknown

May 21, 2011
19:00

(Report)

| İzmir BŞB | 63–100 | Galatasaray |
Scoring by quarter: 22–27, 15–18, 10–26, 7–24
| Pts: - | | Pts: Matthew David Scott 13, Özgür Gürbulak 34, İsmail Ar 13, M. Filipski 27 |

Celal Atik Spor Salonu, İzmir
Attendance: unknown

=== Play-offs ===
First Half

May 27, 2011
15:00

(Report)

| KKTC Turkcell | 49–100 | Galatasaray |
Scoring by quarter: 9–30, 8–35, 22–23, 10–12
| Pts: - | | Pts: Mateusz Filipski 17, Özgür Gürbulak 25 |

Lefkoşa, KKTC
Attendance: unknown

May 28, 2011
17:00

(Report)

| İzmir BŞB | 38–88 | Galatasaray |
Scoring by quarter: 22–27, 15–18, 10–26, 7–24
| Pts: - | | Pts: Matthew David Scott 13, Özgür Gürbulak 34, İsmail Ar 13, M. Filipski 27 |

Lefkoşa, KKTC
Attendance: unknown

May 29, 2011
18:00

(Report)

| Beşiktaş | 72–65 | Galatasaray |
Scoring by quarter: 16–15, 16–18, 22–16, 18–16
| Pts: - |

Lefkoşa, KKTC
Attendance: unknown

Second Half

June 3, 2011
14:00

(Report)

| Galatasaray | 106–52 | KKTC Turkcell |
Scoring by quarter: 27–16, 26–14, 26–9, 27–13
| Pts: Mateusz Filipski 33, Matthew David Scott 28, Petr Tucek 24 | | Pts: - |

Bahçelievler Belediyesi Muhsin Yazıcıoğlu Spor Kompleksi, Istanbul
Attendance: unknown

June 4, 2011
14:00

(Report)

| İzmir BŞB | 54–96 | Galatasaray |
Scoring by quarter: 16–21, 16–28, 19–27, 12–20
| Pts: - | | Pts: Matthew David Scott 17, Özgür Gürbulak 30, Petr Tucek 17, M. Filipski 20 |

Bahçelievler Belediyesi Muhsin Yazıcıoğlu Spor Kompleksi, Istanbul
Attendance: unknown

June 7, 2011
18:00

(Report)

| Galatasaray | 67–46 | Beşiktaş |
Scoring by quarter: 14–14, 17–10, 12–14, 24–8
| Pts: Mateusz Filipski 31, Özgür Gürbulak 22 | | Pts: - |

Sinan Erdem Dome, Istanbul
Attendance: unknown

=== IWBF Champions Cup 2011 ===
==== Qualifying round ====
Galatasaray was qualified and İsmail Ar and Matt Scott were selected to the best 5.

March 11, 2011
19:00

(Report)

| Köln 99ers | 54–72 | Galatasaray |
Scoring by quarter: 12–19, 13–14, 14–24, 15–15
| Pts: Patrick Anderson 15, Mark Broeze 10; Rebs: Patrick Anderson 16; Asts: Patrick Anderson 7, Matthew Rolson 6 | | Pts: Petr Tucek 12, Matthew David Scott 19, Mateusz Filipski 18; Rebs: Matthew David Scott 9, Mateusz Filipski 11, Özgür Gürbulak 8 Asts: Matthew David Scott 9, Özgür Gürbulak 6 |

Sporthalle Nippeser Tälchen, Köln
Attendance: unknown

March 12, 2011
19:00

(Report)

| Galatasaray | 68–59 | FGN Vallodolid |
Scoring by quarter: 20–16, 13–16, 12–11, 23–13
| Pts: Mateusz Filipski 24, Özgür Gürbulak 19; Rebs: Petr Tucek 10, Mateusz Filipski 7, Özgür Gürbulak 8 Asts: Özgür Gürbulak 9, Matthew David Scott 5 | | Pts: Alejandro Zarzuela 20, Tristan Knowles 20, Daniel Highcock 14; Rebs: Daniel Highcock 11, Alejandro Zarzuela 10; Asts: Daniel Highcock 8, Tristan Knowles 5 |

Sporthalle Nippeser Tälchen, Köln
Attendance: unknown

March 12, 2011
16:45

(Report)

| GSD Anmic Sassari | 67–103 | Galatasaray |
Scoring by quarter: 17–23, 15–29, 17–33, 18–18
| Pts: Claudio Spanu 24, Nelson Jaime Sanz Londono 16; Rebs: Nelson Jaime Sanz Londono 6, Claudio Spanu 5 Asts: Samir Bader 6, Maximiliano Ruggeri 5 | | Pts: Matthew David Scott 33, Mateusz Filipski 18; Rebs: Matthew David Scott 9, Özgür Gürbulak 8 Asts: Özgür Gürbulak 4, Mateusz Filipski 5 |

Sporthalle Nippeser Tälchen, Köln
Attendance: unknown

March 13, 2011
12:15

(Report)

| Galatasaray | 72–46 | Hyères Handiclub |
Scoring by quarter: 10–17, 29–6, 19–11, 14–12
| Pts: Mateusz Filipski 32; Rebs: Petr Tucek 6, Mateusz Filipski 9, Özgür Gürbulak 9 Asts: Matthew David Scott 7, Özgür Gürbulak 5 | | Pts: Philippe Nuttin 13, Ouhaid Boustilla 11; Rebs: Edward Mcgee 8, Kossi Amah 6 Asts: Edward Mcgee 6, Philippe Nuttin 5 |

Sporthalle Nippeser Tälchen, Köln
Attendance: unknown

==== Final Group ====
Final Groups

| Group A | Teams |
|---|---|
| 1 | (Turkey) Galatasaray |
| 2 | (Germany) RSC Rollis Zwickau |
| 3 | (Spain) CD Fundosa Grupo |
| 4 | (Italy) CMB Santa Lucia |

| Group B | Teams |
|---|---|
| 1 | (Germany) RSV Lahn-Dill |
| 2 | (Italy) Lottomatica Elecom Roma |
| 3 | (Sweden) Nörrkoping Dolphins |
| 4 | (Spain) FGN Valladolid |

May 6, 2011
14:30

(Report)

| RSC Rollis Zwickau | 73–75 | Galatasaray |
Scoring by quarter: 12–19, 21–24, 22–13, 18–19
| Pts: - Rebs: - Asts: - | | Pts: Mateusz Filipski 23, Özgür Gürbulak 24; Rebs: Mateusz Filipski 12, Petr Tucek 8 Asts: Özgür Gürbulak 14 |

Zwickau, Germany
Attendance: unknown

May 6, 2011
19:00

(Report)

| Galatasaray | 71–61 | CMB Santa Lucia |
Scoring by quarter: 16–16, 18–11, 25–17, 12–17
| Pts: İsmail Ar 19, Özgür Gürbulak 19, Matthew David Scott 11; Rebs: Matthew David Scott 11, Petr Tucek 11; Asts: Özgür Gürbulak 11, Matthew David Scott 11 | | Pts: - Rebs: - Asts: - |

Zwickau, Germany
Attendance: unknown

May 7, 2011
10:30

(Report)

| C.D. Fundosa Grupo | 74–90 | Galatasaray |
Scoring by quarter: 18–18, 16–25, 22–25, 18–22
| Pts: - Rebs: - Asts: - | | Pts: Özgür Gürbulak 29, Petr Tucek 27, Mateusz Filipski 16; Rebs: Petr Tucek 14; Asts: Petr Tucek 9 |

Zwickau, Germany
Attendance: unknown

Semi-Final

May 7, 2011
19:00

(Report)

| Galatasaray | 74–63 | FGN Vallodolid |
Scoring by quarter: 20–16, 16–19, 20–15, 18–13
| Pts: Matthew David Scott 22, Mateusz Filipski 7, Fikri Gündoğdu 15; Rebs: Petr Tucek 9 Asts: Özgür Gürbulak 5, Matthew David Scott 5 | | Pts: - Rebs: - Asts: - |

Zwickau, Germany
Attendance: unknown

FINAL

May 8, 2011
13:15

(Report)

| Galatasaray | 85–80 (OT) | RSV Lahn-Dill |
Scoring by quarter: 13–18, 17–15, 19–18, 20–18, Overtime: 16-11
| Pts: Matthew David Scott 14, Mateusz Filipski 35, Özgür Gürbulak 15, İsmail Ar 16; Rebs: İsmail Ar 9 Asts: Özgür Gürbulak 8, Matthew David Scott 8 | | Pts: - Rebs: - Asts: - |

Zwickau, Germany
Attendance: unknown
