= 2007–08 Galatasaray S.K. (wheelchair basketball) season =

Galatasaray SK
2007–08 season
- Chairman: (Turkey) Ünal Aysal
- Manager: (Turkey) Sedat İncesu
- Turkish Wheelchair Basketball Super League: 1st
- IWBF Champions Cup: Winner
- Kitakyushu Champions Cup: Winner
- Sinan Erdem Cup: Winner

Galatasaray SK Wheelchair Basketball 2007–2008 season is the 2007–2008 basketball season for Turkish professional basketball club Galatasaray SK.

The club competes in:

- IWBF Champions Cup
- Kitakyushu Champions Cup
- Turkish Wheelchair Basketball Super League
- Sinan Erdem Cup

== 2007–08 roster ==
Number	Player	Position
6	(Turkey) Abdülgazi Kahraman	Forward
7	(Turkey) Ahmet Mencik	Forward
10	(Turkey) İsmail Ar	Forward
20	(Turkey) Ali Asker Turan	Forward
21	(Turkey) Eyüp Atırcıoğlu	Center
1	(Turkey) Ferit Gümüş	Center
2	(Sweden) Hussein Haidari	Center
3	(Australia) Justin Eveson	Guard
4	(Turkey) Özgür Gürbulak	Forward
5	(Turkey) Selim Demirdağ	Center
5	(Turkey) Seyran Orman Kurt	Center
11	(Czech Republic) Petr Tuček	Center
11	(Turkey) Selim Sayak	Center

== Squad changes for the 2007–2008 season ==
In: Note: Flags indicate national team as defined under FIFA eligibility rules; some limited exceptions apply. Players may hold more than one non-FIFA nationality.

No.	Pos.	Nation	Player
-		AUS	Justin Eveson (from)
-		SWE	Hussein Haidari (from)

Out: Note: Flags indicate national team as defined under FIFA eligibility rules; some limited exceptions apply. Players may hold more than one non-FIFA nationality.

No.	Pos.	Nation	Player
-		TUR	Serdar Antaç (to)
-		TUR	Şuayip Kablan (to)
-		TUR	Uğur Savluk (to)
-		TUR	Volkan Aydeniz (to)

== Results, schedules and standings ==
=== Turkish Wheelchair Basketball Super League 2007–08 ===
	Team	Pld	W	L	F	A	Pts
1.	Galatasaray	18	18	0	2496	2235	54
2.	Beşiktaş	18	22	8	2471	2209	52
3.	Engelli Yıldızlar TSB	18	21	9	2447	2227	51
4.	İzmir BB TSB	18	20	10	2689	2435	50
5.	Kardemir Karabük TSB	18	19	11	2319	2174	49
6.	Lefkoşa Türk Belediye TSB	18	18	12	2353	2327	48
7.	İskenderun Belediye TSB	18	17	13	2608	2528	47
8.	Ordu Engelliler TSB	18	14	16	2440	2410	44
9.	KK gücü TSB	18	13	17	2285	2404	43
10.	İstanbul Dostluk TSB	18	13	17	2297	2378	43

Pts=Points, Pld=Matches played, W=Matches won, L=Matches lost, F=Points for, A=Points against

==== Regular season ====
First Half

January 13, 2008
14:00

(Report)

Galatasaray	74–41	Kardemir Karabükspor
Scoring by quarter: 13–11, 17–8, 24–10, 20–12
Pts: Justin Eveson 22, Petr Tucek 20		Pts: -

Ahmet Cömert Spor Salonu, Istanbul
Attendance: unknown

January 20, 2008
15:00

(Report)

Ordu Engelliler	37–93	Galatasaray
Scoring by quarter: 8–31, 2–28, 19–16, 3–21
Pts: -		Pts: Petr Tucek 26, Hussein Haidari 15

Atatürk Spor Salonu, İzmir
Attendance: unknown

January 29, 2008
15:00

(Report)

Galatasaray	65–51	İzmir BŞB
Scoring by quarter: 13–13, 8–10, 26–16, 18–12
Pts: Petr Tucek 29, Hussein Haidari 18		Pts: -

Ahmet Cömert Spor Salonu, Istanbul
Attendance: unknown

February 12, 2008
14:00

(Report)

Galatasaray	67–53	Engelli Yıldızlar

Ahmet Cömert Spor Salonu, Istanbul
Attendance: unknown

February 18, 2008
15:30

(Report)

Beşiktaş	59–83	Galatasaray
Scoring by quarter: 11–20, 28–42, 45–72, 59–83

Süleyman Seba Spor Salonu, Istanbul
Attendance: unknown

February 24, 2008
11:00

(Report)

Galatasaray	95–20	Karagücü
Scoring by quarter: 19–16, 24–13, 12–22, 24–17
Pts: Özgür Gürbulak 18, Justin Eveson 18, Ali Asker 13		Pts: -

Ahmet Cömert Spor Salonu, Istanbul
Attendance: unknown

March 3, 2008
14:00

(Report)

Galatasaray	88–25	İskenderun Bedensel

Ahmet Cömert Spor Salonu, Istanbul
Attendance: unknown

March 15, 2008
16:00

(Report)

Lefkoşa Belediyesi	47–76	Galatasaray
Scoring by quarter: 11–20, 28–42, 45–72, 59–83

Lefkoşa Atatürk Spor Salonu, KKTC
Attendance: unknown

March 22, 2008
12:00

(Report)

Dostlukspor	46–87	Galatasaray

Bahçelievler Spor Salonu, Istanbul
Attendance: unknown

Second Half

April 6, 2008
15:00

[postponed (Report)]

Kardemir Karabükspor	0–0	Galatasaray

Karabük Merkez Spor Salonu, Karabük
Attendance: unknown

April 13, 2008
12:00

(Report)

Galatasaray	96–31	Bağcılar Spor Salonu
Pts: Petr Tucek 19, Ferit Gümüş 18, Özgür Gürbulak 16, Justin Eveson 15		Pts: -

Ahmet Cömert Spor Salonu, Istanbul
Attendance: unknown

April 20, 2008
12:00

(Report)

İzmir BŞB	57–73	Galatasaray
Pts: -		Pts: Petr Tucek 18, Özgür Gürbulak 22, Justin Eveson 16

Celal Atik Spor Salonu, İzmir
Attendance: unknown

May 12, 2008
19:00

(Report)

Galatasaray	87–60	Beşiktaş
Scoring by quarter: 28–13, 43–32, 60–48, 87–60
Pts: Justin Eveson 35		Pts: -

Ahmet Cömert Sapor Salonu, Istanbul
Attendance: unknown

May 19, 2008
19:00

(Report)

Galatasaray	77–44	Karagücü
Scoring by quarter: 19–12, 36–21, 52–31, 77–44
Pts: Justin Eveson 25, Özgür Gürbulak 24, Petr Tucek 14		Pts: -

Ahmet Cömert Sapor Salonu, Istanbul
Attendance: unknown

May 31, 2008
12:00

(Report)

Lefkoşa Belediyesi	51–76	Galatasaray
Scoring by quarter: 11–23, 15–18, 10–18, 15–17
Pts: -		Pts: Petr Tucek 14, Özgür Gürbulak 22, Ferit Gümüş 26

Bağcılar Spor Salonu, Istanbul
Attendance: unknown

June 4, 2008
12:00

(Report)

İskenderun Bedensel Eng.	47–90	Galatasaray
Scoring by quarter: 12–17, 9–24, 17–30, 17–19
Pts: -		Pts: Özgür Gürbulak 12, Ferit Gümüş 30

İskenderun
Attendance: unknown

June 8, 2008
12:00

(Report)

Engelli Yıldızlar	74–78	Galatasaray
Scoring by quarter: 10–27, 21–19, 21–20, 22–12
Pts: -		Pts: Justin Eveson 22, Petr Tucek 18

Bağcılar Spor Salonu, Istanbul
Attendance: unknown

June 11, 2008
13:00

(Report)

Kardemir Karabük	67–92	Galatasaray
Scoring by quarter: 11–25, 17–27, 22–21, 17–19
Pts: -		Pts: Özgür Gürbulak 10, Ferit Gümüş 21, Petr Tucek 18, Justin Eveson 16

Merkez Spor Salonu, Karabük
Attendance: unknown

=== Play-offs ===
Quarter-Finals

June 18, 2008
12:00

(Report)

İzmir BŞB	47–67	Galatasaray
Scoring by quarter: 10–21, 13–17, 12–13, 11–16
Pts: -		Pts: Petr Tucek 17, Özgür Gürbulak 22, Ferit Gümüş 22,

Ahmet Cömert Sapor Salonu, Istanbul
Attendance: unknown

June 18, 2008
12:00

(Report)

İzmir BŞB	49–72	Galatasaray
Scoring by quarter: 10–23, 26–44, 36–56, 49–72
Pts: -		Pts: Ferit Gümüş 17, Özgür Gürbulak 23, Petr Tucek 14

Ahmet Cömert Sapor Salonu, Istanbul
Attendance: unknown

FINALS

June 20, 2008
12:00

(Report)

Galatasaray	89–54	Cadbury Kent İstanbul Engelli Yıldızlar
Scoring by quarter: 24–6, 22–24, 21–12, 22–12
Pts: Özgür Gürbulak 30, Petr Tucek 30, Abdülgazi Kahraman 15		Pts: -

Ahmet Cömert Sapor Salonu, Istanbul
Attendance: unknown

June 20, 2011
18:00

(Report)

Cadbury Kent İstanbul Engelli Yıldızlar	61–84	Galatasaray
Scoring by quarter: 18–15, 31–40, 41–66, 61–84

Ahmet Cömert Sapor Salonu, Istanbul
Attendance: unknown

=== IWBF Champions Cup ===
Qualifying round

Galatasaray was qualified.

March 7, 2008
13:30

(Report)

Galatasaray	83–46	CS Meaux (WBC)

CS Meaux (WBC), France
Attendance: unknown

March 8, 2008
9:30

(Report)

Galatasaray	93–64	Beit Halochem

CS Meaux (WBC), France
Attendance: unknown

March 8, 2008
13:30

(Report)

Galatasaray	95–62	ASV Bonn

CS Meaux (WBC), France
Attendance: unknown

March 9, 2008
12:30

(Report)

Galatasaray	75–47	Oldham Owls

CS Meaux (WBC), France
Attendance: unknown

==== Final Group ====
Final Groups

Group A	Teams
1	(Turkey) Galatasaray
2	(Italy) AS Dream Team Onlus Taranto
3	(Spain) CD Fundosa ONCE
4	(France) Hyeres Handiclup

Group B	Teams
1	(Italy) Santa Lucia Sport
2	(France) Toulouse IC
3	(France) CS Meaux (WBC)
4	(Germany) RSV Lahn-Dill

Group Matches

May 2, 2008
14:30

(Report)

Galatasaray	69–55	AS Dream Team Onlus Taranto
Scoring by quarter: 21–17, 44–25, 62–42, 69–55
Pts: Ferit Gümüş 15, Özgür Gürbulak 21, Justin Eveson 21		Pts: -

Madrid, Spain
Attendance: unknown

May 2, 2008
19:00

(Report)

Galatasaray	79–49	Hyeres Handiclup
Pts: Hussein Haidari 12, Justin Eveson 19		Pts: -

Madrid, Spain
Attendance: unknown

May 3, 2008
10:30

(Report)

Galatasaray	66–50	CD Fundeso Once Grupo
Scoring by quarter: 18–13, 34–26, 50–38, 66–50
Pts: Petr Tucek 26, Justin Eveson 26; Asts: Hussein Haidari 11		Pts: - Asts: -

Madrid, Spain
Attendance: unknown

Semi-Final

May 3, 2008
18:30

(Report)

Galatasaray	77–63	CS Meaux (WBC)
Scoring by quarter: 29–24, 42–37, 53–48, 77–63
Pts: Petr Tucek 22, Justin Eveson 35, Ferit Gümüş 14; Asts: Hussein Haidari 10		Pts: - Asts: -

CS Meaux (WBC), France
Attendance: unknown

FINAL

May 4, 2008
14:45

(Report)

Galatasaray	61–53	RSV Rahn-Dill
Scoring by quarter: 14–18, 19–13, 13–14, 15–8
Pts: Petr Tucek 18, Justin Eveson 19, Hussein Haidari 9 Asts: Hussein Haidari 14		Pts: - Asts: -

CS Meaux (WBC), France
Attendance: unknown

=== Kitakyushu Champions Cup 2008 ===
November 28, 2008
9:00

(Report)

Galatasaray	83–46	Miyagi MaX
Scoring by quarter: 27–13, 50–21, 63–35, 83–46
Pts: Matt Scott 26, Justin Eveson 20, Petr Tucek 13		Pts: -

Kitakyushu, Japan
Attendance: unknown

November 29, 2008
11:00

(Report)

Galatasaray	67–53	British Columbia
Scoring by quarter: 17–20, 29–26, 41–38, 67–53
Pts: Justin Eveson 26, Matt Scott 16		Pts: -

Kitakyushu, Japan
Attendance: unknown

November 30, 2008
9:00

(Report)

Galatasaray	74–48	TWP Perth Wheelcats

Kitakyushu, Japan
Attendance: unknown

FINAL

November 30, 2008
18:00

(Report)

Galatasaray	77–62	British Columbia
Scoring by quarter: 12–11, 31–32, 49–55, 62–77
Pts: Justin Eveson 14, Petr Tucek 32		Pts: -

Kitakyushu, Japan
Attendance: unknown

=== Friendly Games ===
March 2008
15:00

(Report)

RSC Rollis Zwickau	56–58	Galatasaray

Zwickau, Germany
Attendance: unknown

March 2008
15:00

(Report)

RSC Rollis Zwickau	46–66	Galatasaray

Zwickau, Germany
Attendance: unknown

April 24, 2008
9:00

(Report)

Santa Lucia Sport	61–78	Galatasaray

Italy
Attendance: unknown

April 24, 2008
18:00

(Report)

Santa Lucia Sport	51–64	Galatasaray

Italy
Attendance: unknown

November 27, 2008
18:00

(Report)

Kitakyushu	22–88	Galatasaray

Japan
Attendance: unknown

=== Sinan Erdem Cup ===
Galatasaray won the cup.

Pos.	Teams
1	(Turkey) Galatasaray
2	(Turkey) Engelli Yıldızlar
3	(Turkey) Beşiktaş
4	(Turkey) İzmir BŞB

May 22, 2008
11:00

(Report)

Beşiktaş	49–72	Galatasaray
Scoring by quarter: 8–21, 8–25, 19–14, 14–12
Pts: -		Pts: Petr Tucek 18, Justin Eveson 16

Ahmet Cömert Sapor Salonu, Istanbul
Attendance: unknown

May 23, 2008
15:00

(Report)

Engelli Yıldızlar	38–94	Galatasaray
Scoring by quarter: 7–27, 16–22, 9–25, 6–20
Pts: -		Pts: Ferit Gümüş 25, Justin Eveson 20, Özgür Gürbulak 22

Ahmet Cömert Sapor Salonu, Istanbul
Attendance: unknown

May 24, 2008
13:00

(Report)

İzmir BŞB	36–76	Galatasaray
Scoring by quarter: 12–28, 13–10, 7–20, 4–18
Pts: -		Pts: Ferit Gümüş 22, Justin Eveson 19

Ahmet Cömert Sapor Salonu, Istanbul
Attendance: unknown

FINAL

May 25, 2008
13:00

(Report)

Engelli Yıldızlar	47–76	Galatasaray

Ahmet Cömert Sapor Salonu, Istanbul
Attendance: unknown
