= 2009–10 Galatasaray S.K. (wheelchair basketball) season =

Galatasaray SK
2009–10 season
- Chairman: (Turkey) Adnan Polat
- Manager: (Turkey) Sedat İncesu
- Turkish Wheelchair Basketball Super League: 1st
- IWBF Champions Cup: 5th

Galatasaray SK Wheelchair Basketball 2009–2010 season is the 2010–2010 basketball season for Turkish professional basketball club Galatasaray SK.

The club competes in:

- IWBF Champions Cup :5th place
- Turkish Wheelchair Basketball Super League :Winner

== 2009–10 roster ==
| Number | Player | Position |
|---|---|---|
| 6 | (United States) Matthew David Scott | Forward |
| 7 | (Turkey) Fikri Gündoğdu | Forward |
| 10 | (Turkey) İsmail Ar | Forward |
| 20 | (Turkey) Murat Yazıcı | Forward |
| 21 | (Turkey) Ramazan Kahraman | Center |
| 1 | (Czech Republic) Petr Tuček | Center |
| 2 | (Turkey) Ömer Gürkan | Center |
| 3 | (Turkey) Selim Sayak | Guard |
| 4 | (Iraq) (Sweden) Hussein Haidari | Forward |
| 5 | (Australia) Justin Eveson | Center |
| 5 | (Turkey) Ferit Gümüş | Center |

== Squad changes for the 2009–2010 season ==
In: Note: Flags indicate national team as defined under FIFA eligibility rules; some limited exceptions apply. Players may hold more than one non-FIFA nationality.

| No. | Pos. | Nation | Player |
|---|---|---|---|
| - | | ISR | Dotan Meishar (from) |
| - | | TUR | Murat Yazıcı (from) |
| - | | TUR | Ramazan Kahraman (from) |

Out: Note: Flags indicate national team as defined under FIFA eligibility rules; some limited exceptions apply. Players may hold more than one non-FIFA nationality.

| No. | Pos. | Nation | Player |
|---|---|---|---|
| - | | AUS | Troy Sachs (to) |
| - | | TUR | Şuayip Kablan (to) |
| - | | TUR | Serdar Antaç (to) |
| - | | TUR | Selim Demirdağ (to) |

== Results, schedules and standings ==
=== Turkish Wheelchair Basketball Super League 2009–10 ===
==== Regular season ====
Galatasaray won the superleague.
1st Half

November 14, 2009
13:00

(Report)

| Lefkoşa Belediyesi | 42–95 | Galatasaray |
Scoring by quarter: 8–28, 12–25, 10–21, 12–21
| Pts: - | | Pts: Ferit Gümüş 25, Justin Eveson 20 |

N/A, KKTC
Attendance: unknown

November 22, 2009
13:00

(Report)

| Galatasaray | 95–10 | Antalya Büyükşehir Belediyesi SK |
Scoring by quarter: 23–2, 21–4, 23–4, 28–0
| Pts: Matthew David Scott 24, Dothan Meishar 24, S. Sayak 14, Petr Tucek 18 | | Pts: - |

Ahmet Cömert Spor Salonu, Istanbul
Attendance: unknown

December 6, 2009
13:00

(Report)

| Adana Engelliler | 39–101 | Galatasaray |
Scoring by quarter: 14–28, 9–31, 10–26, 6–16
| Pts: - | | Pts: Matthew David Scott 30, Ferit Gümüş 38, Dothan Meishar 14 |

Adana
Attendance: unknown

December 13, 2009
13:00

(Report)

| İzmir BŞB | 42–77 | Galatasaray |
Scoring by quarter: 11–18, 13–26, 12–14, 6–19
| Pts: - | | Pts: Petr Tucek 31, Ferit Gümüş 20, Matthew David Scott 19 |

İzmir Salonu, İzmir
Attendance: unknown

December 20, 2009
13:00

(Report)

| Galatasaray | 81–47 | Kardemir Karabük |
Scoring by quarter: 23–10, 17–12, 21–14, 20–11
| Pts: Petr Tucek 32, Ferit Gümüş 16, Selim Sayak 15 | | Pts: - |

Ahmet Cömert Spor Salonu, Istanbul
Attendance: unknown

January 3, 2010
13:00

(Report)

| Saran Anadolu | 74–70 | Galatasaray |
Scoring by quarter: 10–19, 30–23, 11–12, 23–16
| Pts: - | | Pts: Justin Eveson 25, Petr Tucek 17, Matthew David Scott 12 |

İTO Spor Salonu, Istanbul
Attendance: unknown

January 11, 2010
19:00

(Report)

| Galatasaray | 82–62 | Cadbury Kent Engelli Yıldızlar |
Scoring by quarter: 24–15, 22–15, 20–12, 16–20
| Pts: Justin Eveson 23, Petr Tucek 22, Ferit Gümüş 20 | | Pts: - |

Ahmet Cömert Spor Salonu, Istanbul
Attendance: unknown

January 16, 2010
13:00

(Report)

| Beşiktaş | 62–86 | Galatasaray |
Scoring by quarter: 22–24, 14–24, 12–19, 14–19
| Pts: - | | Pts: Ferit Gümüş 24, Matthew David Scott 41, Justin Eveson 23 |

Süleyman Seba Spor Salonu, Istanbul
Attendance: unknown

January 24, 2010
11:00

(Report)

| Galatasaray | 86–39 | Karagücü |
Scoring by quarter: 20–11, 19–23, 27–4, 20–4
| Pts: Dothan Meishar 24, Ferit Gümüş 22, Selim Sayak 16, Matthew David Scott 14 | | Pts: - |

Ahmet Cömert Spor Salonu, Istanbul
Attendance: unknown

2nd Half

February 21, 2010
16:00

(Report)

| KKTC Turkcell | 48–101 | Galatasaray |
| Pts: - | | Pts: Matthew David Scott 30, Ferit Gümüş 32, Petr Tucek 12 |

Istanbul
Attendance: unknown

March 7, 2010
12:00

(Report)

| Antalya Büyükşehir Belediyesi SK | 47–78 | Galatasaray |
Scoring by quarter: 8–21, 14–22, 14–21, 11–14
| Pts: - | | Pts: Matthew David Scott 12, Selim Sayak 16, Fikri Gündoğdu 12 |

Antalya
Attendance: unknown

March 21, 2010
15:00

(Report)

| Adana Engelliler | 48–88 | Galatasaray |
Scoring by quarter: 9–25, 14–24, 10–22, 15–20
| Pts: - | | Pts: Petr Tucek 20, Dothan Meishar 20, Ferit Gümüş 17, Selim Sayak 14 |

Adana Spor Salonu, Adana
Attendance: unknown

March 28, 2010
12:00

(Report)

| Galatasaray | 77–56 | İzmir BŞB |
Scoring by quarter: 25–15, 13–16, 25–11, 14–16
| Pts: Matthew David Scott 25, Justin Eveson 22, Ferit Gümüş 22 | | Pts: - |

Ahmet Cömert Spor Salonu, Istanbul
Attendance: unknown

April 11, 2010
19:00

(Report)

| Kardemir Karabük | 46–81 | Galatasaray |
Scoring by quarter: 19–15, 8–26, 13–13, 6–26
| Pts: - | | Pts: Justin Eveson 27, Ferit Gümüş 21, Selim Sayak 14 |

Kardemir Karabük Salonu, Karabük
Attendance: unknown

April 18, 2010
13:00

(Report)

| Galatasaray | 101–57 | Saran Anadolu |
Scoring by quarter: 26–7, 20–17, 25–16, 30–17
| Pts: Justin Eveson 34, Ferit Gümüş 31, Matthew David Scott 16 | | Pts: - |

Ahmet Cömert Spor Salonu, Istanbul
Attendance: unknown

April 21, 2010
19:00

(Report)

| Karagücü | 46–85 | Galatasaray |
Scoring by quarter: 12–18, 13–28, 6–23, 15–16
| Pts: - | | Pts: Dothan Meishar 26, Ferit Gümüş 16, Justin Eveson 12 |

Ankara
Attendance: unknown

May 10, 2010
19:00

(Report)

| Cadbury Kent Engelli Yıldızlar | 65–95 | Galatasaray |
Scoring by quarter: 21–22, 15–27, 23–19, 6–27
| Pts: - | | Pts: Matthew David Scott 46, Ferit Gümüş 16, Petr Tucek 28 |

Ahmet Cömert Spor Salonu
Attendance: unknown

May 12, 2010
19:00

(Report)

| Galatasaray | 76–71 | Beşiktaş |
Scoring by quarter: 23–16, 16–20, 17–18, 19–17
| Pts: Matthew David Scott 21, Ferit Gümüş 21, Petr Tucek 24 | | Pts: - |

Ahmet Cömert Sapor Salonu, Istanbul
Attendance: unknown

=== Friendly Game ===
April 28, 2010
19:00

(Report)

| CMB Santa Lucia | 58–76 | Galatasaray |

Rome, Italy
Attendance: unknown

=== IWBF Champions Cup ===
Galatasaray got the 5th place in this tournament.

April 30, 2010
16:45

(Report)

| Lottomatica Elecom Sport Roma | 85–81 | Galatasaray |
Scoring by quarter: 20–25, 28–22, 22–12, 15–22
| Pts: Bradley Ness 29, Audrey Cayol 20, Sandro Cherubini 14, Amine Moukhariq 14; Rebs: Bradley Ness 8 Asts: Bradley Ness 7 | | Pts: Justin Eveson 33, Petr Tucek 27, Ferit Gümüş 17; Rebs: Justin Eveson 8, Petr Tucek 7 Asts: Justin Eveson 9, Petr Tucek 6, Hussein Haidari 13 |

Rome, Italy
Attendance: unknown

April 30, 2010
21:15

(Report)

| Galatasaray | 76–77 | CD Fundosa ONCE |
Scoring by quarter: 21–14, 19–30, 16–20, 20–13
| Pts: Justin Eveson 32, Petr Tucek 21; Rebs: Justin Eveson 11, Petr Tucek 7 Asts: Justin Eveson 8, Petr Tucek 3, Matthew David Scott 14 | | Pts: Terry Bywater 27; Rebs: - Asts: Terry Bywater 7 |

Rome, Italy
Attendance: unknown

May 1, 2010
12:45

(Report)

| RSC Rollis Zwickau | 75–72 | Galatasaray |
| Pts: Mateusz Filipski 27, Piotr Luszynski 14; Rebs: Mateusz Filipski 7 Asts: Piotr Luszynski 15 | | Pts: Justin Eveson 35, Matthew David Scott 12, Ferit Gümüş 17; Rebs: Justin Eveson 11, Matthew David Scott 6 Asts: Justin Eveson 5, Matthew David Scott 5 |

Rome, Italy
Attendance: unknown

May 1, 2010
16:15

(Report)

| C.D. Once Andalucia | 53–80 | Galatasaray |
Scoring by quarter: 14–20, 6–22, 21–18, 12–20
| Pts: - Rebs: - Asts: - | | Pts: Justin Eveson 30; Rebs: Justin Eveson 14; Asts: Justin Eveson 16 |

Rome, Italy
Attendance: unknown

May 2, 2010
11:00

(Report)

| Galatasaray | 83–53 | Asec WBC |
Scoring by quarter: 25–18, 16–10, 28–16, 14–9
| Pts: Matthew David Scott 26; Rebs: - Asts: Matthew David Scott 11 | | Pts: - Rebs: - Asts: - |

Rome, Italy
Attendance: unknown
