= 2006–07 Galatasaray S.K. (wheelchair basketball) season =

Galatasaray SK
2006–07 season
- Chairman: (Turkey) Ünal Aysal
- Manager: (Turkey) Sedat İncesu
- Turkish Wheelchair Basketball Super League: 1st
- André Vergauwen Cup: 4th
- Chieti Cup: 1st

Galatasaray SK Wheelchair Basketball 2006–2007 season is the 2006–2007 basketball season for Turkish professional basketball club Galatasaray SK.

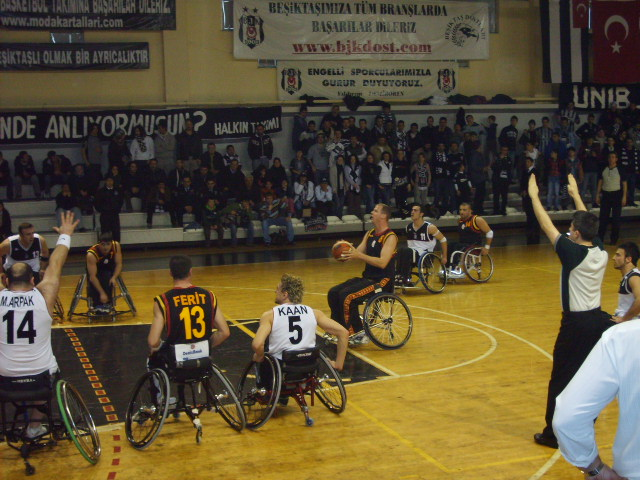
Galatasaray vs Beşiktaş - Feb 17, 2007

The club competes in:

- André Vergauwen Cup
- Turkish Wheelchair Basketball Super League

== 2006–07 roster ==
| Number | Player | Position |
|---|---|---|
| 10 | (Turkey) Özgür Gürbulak | Forward |
| 9 | (Turkey) Ahmet Mencik | Forward |
| 12 | (Turkey) Şuayip Kablan | Center |
| 7 | (Turkey) Ali Asker Turan | Guard |
| 4 | (Turkey) Eyüp Atırcıoğlu | Forward |
| 8 | (Czech Republic) Petr Tuček | Center |
| 13 | (Turkey) Ferit Gümüş | Center |
| 11 | (Turkey) Uğur Savluk | Guard |
| 5 | (Turkey) Selim Demirdağ | Forward |
| 6 | (Turkey) Volkan Aydeniz | Forward |
| 14 | (Turkey) Serdar Antaç | Forward |
| 15 | (Turkey) Selim Sayak | Guard |

== Squad changes for the 2006–07 season ==
In: Note: Flags indicate national team as defined under FIFA eligibility rules; some limited exceptions apply. Players may hold more than one non-FIFA nationality.

| No. | Pos. | Nation | Player |
|---|---|---|---|
| 10 | | TUR | Özgür Gürbulak (from İzmir BŞB) |
| 11 | | TUR | Uğur Savluk (from German Team) |
| 14 | | TUR | Serdar Antaç (from) |
| 8 | | CZE | Petr Tuček (from Rollis Zwickau) |

Out: Note: Flags indicate national team as defined under FIFA eligibility rules; some limited exceptions apply. Players may hold more than one non-FIFA nationality.

| No. | Pos. | Nation | Player |
|---|---|---|---|
| - | | TUR | Abdülgazi Kahraman (to) |
| - | | TUR | Aytaç Ercan (to Beşiktaş) |
| - | | TUR | Umut Akbay (to) |
| - | | TUR | Umut Ünar (to Beşiktaş) |
| - | | TUR | Can Polat Çolak (to Engelli Yıldızlar) |

== Results, schedules and standings ==
=== Turkish Wheelchair Basketball Super League 2006–07 ===
==== Regular season ====
First Half

December 24, 2006
121:00

[ (Report)]

| Cadbury Kent Engelli Yıldızlar | 57–73 | Galatasaray |
Scoring by quarter: 15–17, 13–19, 12–18, 17–19
| Pts: - | | Pts: Petr Tucek 40 |

Bahçelievler Spor Salonu, Istanbul
Attendance: 100

January 14, 2007
14:00

[ (Report)]

| Galatasaray | 113–25 | Antalya BŞB SK |
Scoring by quarter: 27–7, 53–12, 85–20, 113–25
| Pts: Petr Tucek 26; Rebs: Petr Tucek 10; Asts: Petr Tucek 5 | | Pts: - Rebs: - Asts: - |

Ahmet Cömert Spor Salonu, Istanbul
Attendance: unknown

January 21, 2007
12:00

[ (Report)]

| İzmir BŞB | 32–69 | Galatasaray |
Scoring by quarter: 13–23, 16–42, 22–56, 32–69
| Pts: - | | Pts: - |

Celal Atik Spor Salonu, İzmir
Attendance: 250

January 28, 2007
14:00

[ (Report)]

| Galatasaray | 89–41 | Kardemir Karabük SK |
Scoring by quarter: 24–5, 53–12, 58–28, 89–41
| Pts: Özgür Gürbulak 29, Volkan Aydeniz 21 | | Pts: - |

Ahmet Cömert Spor Salonu, Istanbul
Attendance: unknown

February 3, 2007
12:00

[ (Report)]

| Lefkoşa Belediyesi SK | 45–79 | Galatasaray |
Scoring by quarter: 14-22, 12–25, 12–12, 7–20

Lefkoşa Atatürk Spor Salonu, KKTC
Attendance: unknown

February 18, 2007
15:30

[ (Report)]

| Beşiktaş | 54–71 | Galatasaray |
Scoring by quarter: 18-12, 10–25, 12–14, 14–30

Süleyman Seba Spor Salonu, Istanbul
Attendance: unknown

February 25, 2007
12:00

[ (Report)]

| TSK Karagücü | 52–69 | Galatasaray |
| Pts: - | | Pts: Ferit Gümüş 29 |

Bilkent TSK Rehabilitasyon Tesisleri, Ankara
Attendance: unknown

March 4, 2007
14:00

[ (Report)]

| Galatasaray | 93–56 | Adana Engelliler S.K. |
Scoring by quarter: 27–17, 19–11, 24–14, 23–14
| Pts: Petr Tucek 25, Ferit Gümüş 13, Özgür Gürbulak 17 | | Pts: - |

Ahmet Cömert Spor Salonu, Istanbul
Attendance: 15

March 5, 2007
15:00

[ (Report)]

| Galatasaray | 70–43 | Ordu B.E.S.K. |
Scoring by quarter: 16–11, 16–12, 16–12, 22–9
| Pts: Petr Tucek 26, Ferit Gümüş 19 | | Pts: - |

Ahmet Cömert Spor Salonu, Istanbul
Attendance: 8

Second Half

March 24, 2007
12:00

[ (Report)]

| Galatasaray | 73–43 | Cadbury Kent Engelli Yıldızlar |
Scoring by quarter: 17–11, 17–9, 22–9, 17–14
| Pts: Ferit Gümüş 16, Petr Tucek 30, Özgür Gürbulak 16 | | Pts: - |

Ahmet Cömert Spor Salonu, Istanbul
Attendance: unknown

April 1, 2007
14:00

[ (Report)]

| Antalya BŞB | 31–85 | Galatasaray |

Antalya Atatürk S.S., Antalya
Attendance: unknown

April 9, 2007
14:00

[ (Report)]

| Galatasaray | 70–34 | İzmir BŞB |
Scoring by quarter: 19–8, 15–12, 17–6, 19–6
| Pts: Ali Asker 13, Ferit Gümüş 23 | | Pts: - |

Ahmet Cömert Spor Salonu, Istanbul
Attendance: unknown

April 15, 2007
13:30

[ (Report)]

| Kardemir Karabük SK | 73–91 | Galatasaray |
Scoring by quarter: 19-23, 11–24, 24–22, 19–22
| Pts: - | | Pts: Petr Tucek 18, Şuayip Kablan15 |

Karabük Merkez Spor Salonu, Istanbul
Attendance: unknown

April 17, 2007
12:00

[ (Report)]

| Galatasaray | 81–29 | Lefkoşa Belediyesi SK |
Scoring by quarter: 19–15, 17–10, 20–4, 25–0

Bahçelievler Spor Salonu, Istanbul
Attendance: unknown

May 21, 2007
12:00

[ (Report)]

| Adana Engelliler SK | 60–83 | Galatasaray |

Adana Spor Salonu, Adana
Attendance: unknown

June 9, 2007
12:00

[ (Report)]

| Ordu Engelliler SK | 30–91 | Galatasaray |

Ordu Atatürk Spor Salonu, Ordu
Attendance: unknown

June 11, 2007
12:00

[ (Report)]

| Galatasaray | 67–24 | TSK Karagücü |

Bahçelievler Spor Salonu, Istanbul
Attendance: unknown

June 20, 2007
19:30

[ (Report)]

| Galatasaray | 77–49 | Beşiktaş |
Scoring by quarter: 14–10, 18–8, 29–18, 16–13
| Pts: Ferit Gümüş 19, Petr Tucek 19, Özgür Gürbulak 19 | | Pts: - |

Ahmet Cömert Spor Salonu, Istanbul
Attendance: unknown

==== Play-offs ====
June 23, 2007
12:00

[ (Report)]

| Galatasaray | 61–37 | İzmir BŞB |

Ahmet Cömert Spor Salonu, Istanbul
Attendance: unknown

June 24, 2007
12:00

[ (Report)]

| Galatasaray | 68–39 | İzmir BŞB |

Ahmet Cömert Spor Salonu, Istanbul
Attendance: unknown

FINAL

June 30, 2007
19:00

[ (Report)]

| Galatasaray | 57–48 | Beşiktaş |

Ahmet Cömert Spor Salonu, Istanbul
Attendance: unknown

July 1, 2007
19:00

[ (Report)]

| Galatasaray | 75–66 | Beşiktaş |

Ahmet Cömert Spor Salonu, Istanbul
Attendance: unknown

=== André Vergauwen Cup ===
==== Qualification Tour ====
| Group C | Participated Teams |
|---|---|
| 1 | (Turkey) Galatasaray |
| 2 | (Belgium) Roller Bulls St Vith |
| 3 | (France) Toulouse I.C. |
| 4 | (Greece) Paska Athens |
| 5 | (Netherlands) SC Antilope |

March 9, 2007
20:45

[ (Report)]

| Galatasaray | 95–45 | Paska Athens |

Saint-Vith, Belgium
Attendance: unknown

March 10, 2007
12:15

[ (Report)]

| Galatasaray | 88–64 | Roller Bulls St Vith |
Scoring by quarter: 16–11, 16–12, 16–12, 22–9

Saint-Vith, Belgium
Attendance: unknown

March 10, 2007
16:45

[ (Report)]

| Galatasaray | 99–79 | Toulouse I.C. |
Scoring by quarter: 24–25, 21–18, 28–20, 26–16

Saint-Vith, Belgium
Attendance: unknown

March 11, 2007
10:00

[ (Report)]

| Galatasaray | 91–69 | SC Antilope |
Scoring by quarter: 29–16, 27–19, 16–16, 19–11

Saint-Vith, Belgium
Attendance: unknown

==== FINALS ====
| Group A | Teams | Pld | Win | Lose | F | A | Pts |
|---|---|---|---|---|---|---|---|
| 1 | (Turkey) Galatasaray | 3 | 3 | 0 | 222 | 198 | 6 |
| 2 | (Italy) A.S. Stefano | 3 | 2 | 1 | 200 | 184 | 5 |
| 3 | (France) CAPSAA | 3 | 1 | 2 | 199 | 194 | 4 |
| 4 | (Spain) Vital Vigo Amfiv | 3 | 0 | 3 | 175 | 220 | 3 |

April 27, 2007
11:30

[ (Report)]

| Galatasaray | 78–74 | A.S. Stefano |

Fabriano, Italy
Attendance: unknown

April 27, 2007
16:00

[ (Report)]

| Galatasaray | 73–64 | Vital Vigo Amfiv |

Fabriano, Italy
Attendance: unknown

April 28, 2007
9:30

[ (Report)]

| Galatasaray | 71–60 | CAPSAA |

Fabriano, Italy
Attendance: unknown

===== Semi-final =====
April 28, 2007
17:30

[ (Report)]

| Galatasaray | 77–82 | ASV Bonn |

Fabriano, Italy
Attendance: unknown

===== 3rd-4th-place match =====
April 29, 2007
11:30

[ (Report)]

| Galatasaray | 62–86 | A.S. Stefano |

Fabriano, Italy
Attendance: unknown

=== Friendly Games ===
October 24, 2007
10:30

[ (Report)]

| Galatasaray | 95–85 | Gullianova |

Chieti, Italia
Attendance: unknown

=== Chieti Cup ===
- Galatasaray won the cup

| Group C | Participated Teams |
|---|---|
| 1 | (Turkey) Galatasaray |
| 2 | (Italy) ANMIC Sassari |
| 3 | (Italy) S. Stefano Banca Marche |
| 4 | (Italy) ELECOM |

October 24, 2007
16:30

[ (Report)]

| Galatasaray | 62–67 | ANMIC Sassari |

Chieti, Italia
Attendance: unknown

October 25, 2007
18:30

[ (Report)]

| Galatasaray | 80–71 | ELECOM |
| Pts: Ferit Gümüş 23, Petr Tucek 34 | | Pts: - |

Chieti, Italia
Attendance: unknown

October 26, 2007
18:30

[ (Report)]

| Galatasaray | ?–? | S. Stefano Banca Marche |

Chieti, Italia
Attendance: unknown

FINAL

October 27, 2007
18:00

[ (Report)]

| Galatasaray | 96–79 | ELECOM |
| Pts: Ferit Gümüş 16, Petr Tucek 42 | | Pts: - |

Chieti, Italia, Belgium
Attendance: unknown
