= Aytaç Ercan =

Turkish wheelchair basketball player

No. 13 – Beşiktaş Wheelchair Basketball Team
- Position: Center
- League: Turkish Wheelchair Basketball Super League

Personal information
- Born: 21 December 1976 (age 49) Istanbul, Turkey

Career information
- Playing career: 1998–present

Career history
- 2003-2005: Beşiktaş
- 2005-2007: Galatasaray
- 2007-present: Beşiktaş

Aytaç Ercan (born 21 December 1976) is a Turkish wheelchair basketball player and Paralympian. He is a 4 point player competing for Beşiktaş Wheelchair Basketball Team, and is part of Turkey men's national wheelchair basketball team.

He became a polio survivor due to not having been vaccinated as an infant.

Aytaç Ercan played in the national team, which qualified to the 2012 Summer Olympics.

== Sporting career ==
He began playing wheelchair basketball in 1998 at the Istanbul Youth Disabled Sport Club. Following two champion titles earned in 1999 and 2000, he transferred to Istanbul Fatih Disabled Sport Club. In the beginning of 2003, he became a member of Beşiktaş Wheelchair Basketball Team, and was admitted to the national team. With the foundation of the Galatasaray Wheelchair Basketball Team, Ercan signed with this team, and his team became already in its first season champion in the Second Wheelchair Basketball League. In 2006, Ercan transferred back to Beşiktaş.

Aytaç Ercan was named MVP at the 2002 Malmö Open in Sweden. He became top scorer at an international tournament, and was selected to All Star Team at the 2006 Balkan Cup. Ercan played in the national team, which won the 2011 André Vergauwen Cup.

At the 2012 Summer Paralympics, the national team, he was part of, ranked 7th.

== Achievements ==
Year	Competition	Venue	Position	Notes
Representing Turkey
2009	IWBF Champions Cup		2nd place, silver medalist(s)	Beşiktaş
2010	WB World Championship	Birmingham, United Kingdom	8th	national team
2011	IWBF Champions Cup		5th	Beşiktaş
2012	Summer Paralympics	London, United Kingdom	7th	national team
