= Cem Gezinci =

Turkish wheelchair basketball player

No. 1 – Galatasaray
- Position: Forward
- League: Turkish Wheelchair Basketball Super League

Personal information
- Born: 1 September 1985 (age 41) Istanbul, Turkey

Career history
- ?: Galatasaray

Cem Gezinci (born 1 September 1985 in Istanbul, Turkey) is a Turkish wheelchair basketball player and Paralympian. He is a 4.5 point player competing for Beşiktaş, and is part of Turkey men's national wheelchair basketball team.

Cem plays in the national team, which qualified to the 2016 Summer Paralympics in Rio de Janeiro, Brazil.

== Career history ==
He played in the national team, which ranked eight at the 2010 Wheelchair Basketball World Championship held in Birmingham, United Kingdom .

At the 2012 Summer Paralympics, the national team he was part of, ranked 7th.

At the 2014 World Championships in Incheon, South Korea the national team he was part of, scored the bronze medal.

== Achievements ==
Year	Competition	Venue	Position	Notes
Representing Turkey
2010	WB World Championship	Birmingham, United Kingdom	8th	national team
2012	Summer Paralympics	London, United Kingdom	7th	national team
2013	IWBF European Championship	Frankfurt, Germany	2nd place, silver medalist(s)	national team
2014	WB World Championship	Incheon, South Korea	3rd place, bronze medalist(s)	national team
2015	IWBF European Championship	Worcester, United Kingdom	2nd place, silver medalist(s)	national team
2016	Summer Paralympics	Rio de Janeiro, Brazil	4th	national team
2017	IWBF European Championship	Tenerife, Spain	1st place, gold medalist(s)	national team
