= Jontee Brown =

Australian wheelchair basketball player (born 1997)

Personal information
- Born: 24 December 1997 (age 28) Canberra, ACT, Australia

Sport
- Position: Center / power forward
- Disability class: 4.5
Medal record
Representing Australia
Men's wheelchair basketball
Asia Oceania Championships
Gold medal – first place	2025 Bangkok	Team
World Championship
Gold medal – first place	2026 Ottawa	Team

Jontee Brown (born 24 December 1997) is a wheelchair basketball player from Australia.

== Early life ==
Jontee Brown was born in Canberra, ACT on 24 December 1997 and rased in Bendigo, Victoria. After falling into a sinkhole in 2015, he was diagnosed with reactive arthritis in his left knee as well as ankylosing spondylitis in his lower spine.

== Career ==
Brown started playing wheelchair basketball in May 2016. In 2016, he began playing with the Bendigo Braves on the local level and the Kilsyth Cobras of the NWBL the following year. He also played for the German team Köln 99ers and the French team CS Meaux. In 2025, he was signed by the Wollongong Roller Hawks of the NWBL and later Beşiktaş of the Turkish Wheelchair Basketball Super League.

At the 2025 Asia Oceania Championships, Brown was a member of the Rollers that won the championship after defeating Japan 62–57. In September 2026, he was part of the national squad that won the 2026 Wheelchair Basketball World Championships.

Brown is a Victorian Institute of Sport scholarship athlete.
