= Kaan Dalay =

Turkish wheelchair basketball player

No. 11 – Beşiktaş RMK wheelchair basketball team
- Position: Guard
- League: Turkish Wheelchair Basketball Super League

Personal information
- Born: 26 July 1981 (age 45)

Kaan Dalay (born 26 July 1981) is a Turkish wheelchair basketball player and Paralympian. He competes in the Turkish Wheelchair Basketball Super League for Beşiktaş RMK wheelchair basketball team, and is part of Turkey men's national wheelchair basketball team.

He played at the 2012 Summer Paralympics in London, United Kingdom and 2016 Summer Paralympics in Rio de Janeiro, Brazil.
