= Troy Sachs =

Australian wheelchair basketballer

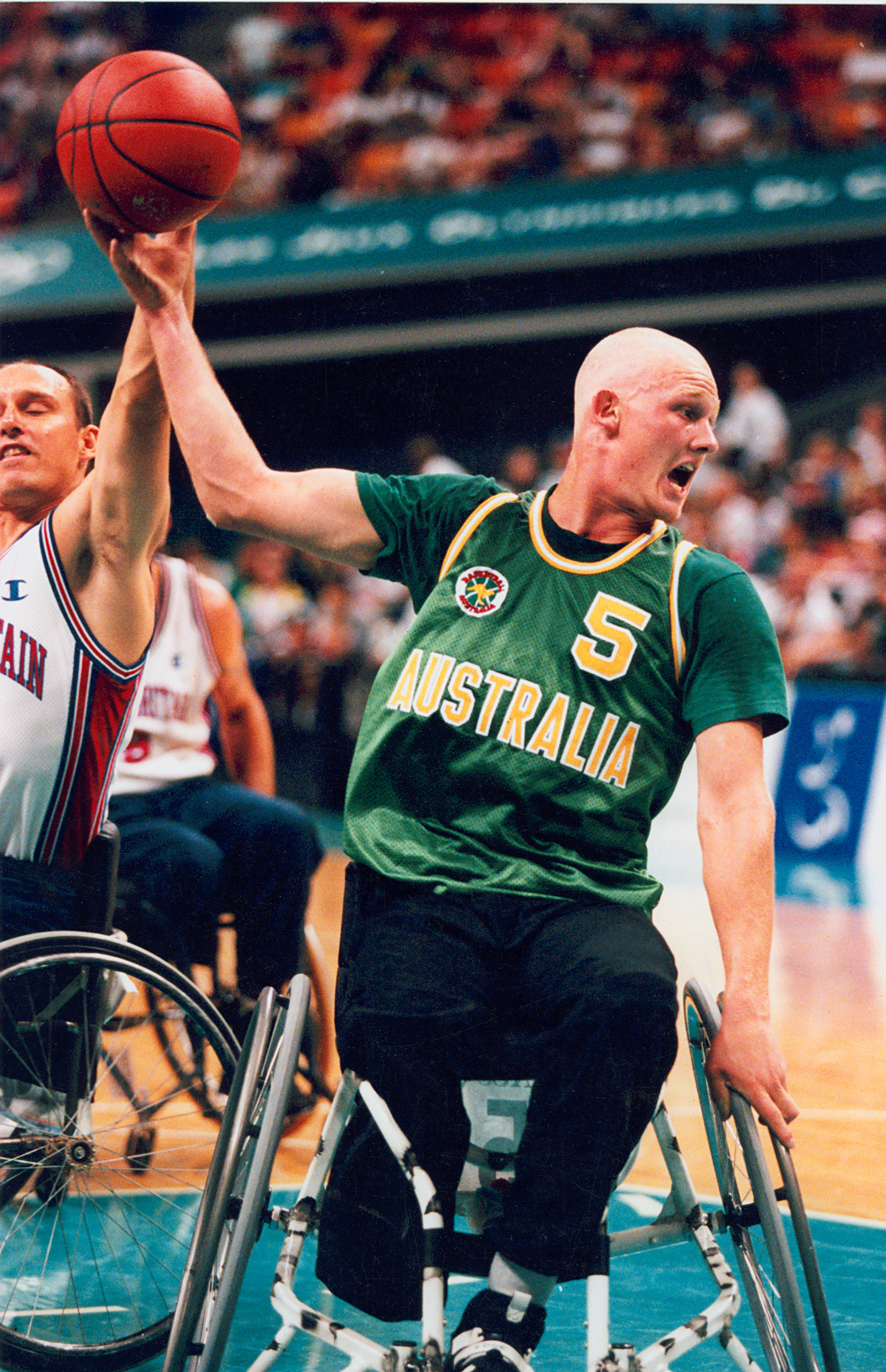

Personal information
- Full name: Troy Sachs
- Nationality: Australia
- Born: 3 December 1975 (age 50) Bulli, New South Wales

Sport
- Club: West Sydney Razorbacks (NWBL)
Medal record
Men's wheelchair basketball
Representing Australia
Paralympic Games
Gold medal – first place	1996 Atlanta	Men's team
Silver medal – second place	2004 Athens	Men's team
Gold medal – first place	2008 Beijing	Men's team

Troy Sachs, OAM (born 3 December 1975) is an Australian wheelchair basketball player. He competed at five Paralympic Games from 1992 to 2008, where he won three medals. Sachs won two national league championships in Australia, three national league championships in the United States, one national league championship in Germany, and an André Vergauwen Cup championship with Italian club Tabu Cantu.

== Personal ==
Sachs was born in the suburb of Bulli on 3 December 1975. He was born without a tibia and with a deformed foot, and the affected leg was amputated below the knee when he was two and a half years old; he has worn a prosthetic leg since then.

In 2006, Sachs had shoulder surgery and required extensive rehabilitation that threatened to derail his ability to compete in the 2008 Paralympics.

On 11 August 2010, Sachs competed in the 14-kilometre (9 mi) Sydney City2Surf competitions, where he raised nearly $2,000 in support of Wheelchair Sport New South Wales's Junior Sports Program.

He is the founder and director of Team Sachs, a fitness business, which he established in 1997, and has been on the board of directors of the Australian Paralympic Committee since 2008. He has been married to Philippa Margan since 2014; he was previously married to wheelchair basketballer Jane Sachs. He has a daughter and a son.

In 2017, he coached the Sydney Metro Blues to a gold medal in the Women's National Wheelchair Basketball League.

== Competitive basketball ==
Sachs' wheelchair basketball classification is 4.5 and his position is centre. He started playing wheelchair basketball in 1991, at the age of 15, after having been introduced to the sport at high school by a visiting lecturer on spine safety.

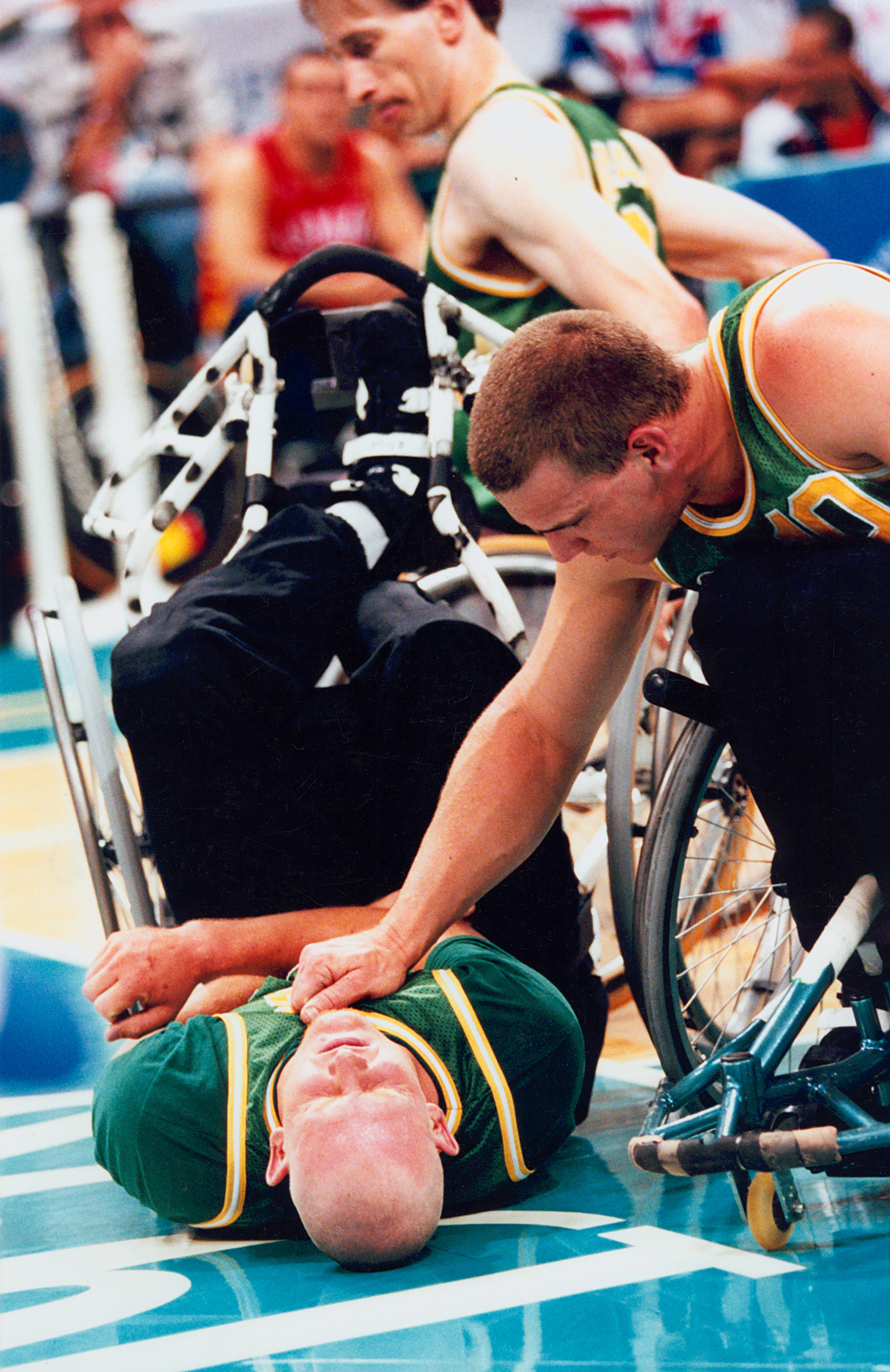
Sachs in the gold medal game against Great Britain at the 1996 Atlanta Paralympics

=== National team ===
Sachs made his first team appearance for the Australia men's national wheelchair basketball team in 1992. In 1998, he competed at the World Championships, where the Rollers finished fourth. In 2002, he was part of the Australian national side that finished fourth at the World Championships. In 2004, he was part of the Australian team that finished first at the Roosevelt Cup.

Sachs was part of the gold medal-winning team at the Kiakyushu Cup held in Japan in 2005. He did not compete for the national team at the 2005 Paralympic World Cup due to European club commitments and did not compete in the 2006 World Championships due to injury.

=== Paralympic Games ===
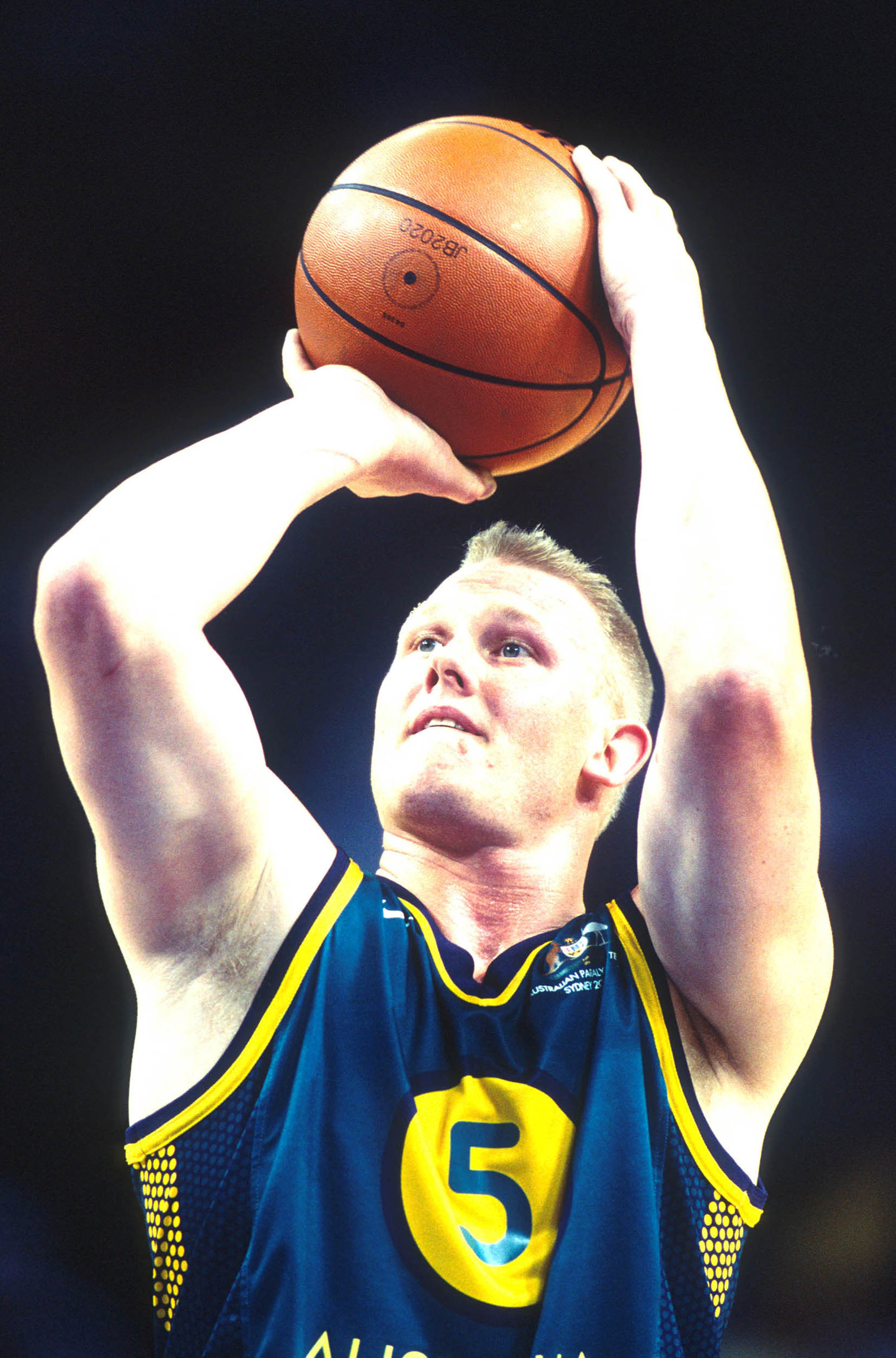
Sachs takes a free throw as part of the Australian men's wheelchair basketball team at the 2000 Summer Paralympics

Sachs was part of the Australian men's wheelchair basketball team at the 1992 Barcelona, 1996 Atlanta, 2000 Sydney, 2004 Athens, and 2008 Beijing Paralympics; he won gold medals with his team in 1996 and 2008, a silver medal in 2004, and his team finished 8th and 5th in 1992 and 2000, respectively.

At the 1996 Games, in the gold medal match, Sachs scored 42 points, a world record for the number of points scored. At the 2000 and 2004 games, Sachs captained the Australian national team. At the 2008 Paralympics in Beijing, he led his team in total scoring across the whole of the competition, with a score of 72–60 when the team defeated Canada. In the tournament, he averaged 5.4 points a game, but scored 19 total points in the final. Sachs was the only 2008 team member who had also been on the 1996 gold medal-winning team.

=== Club basketball ===
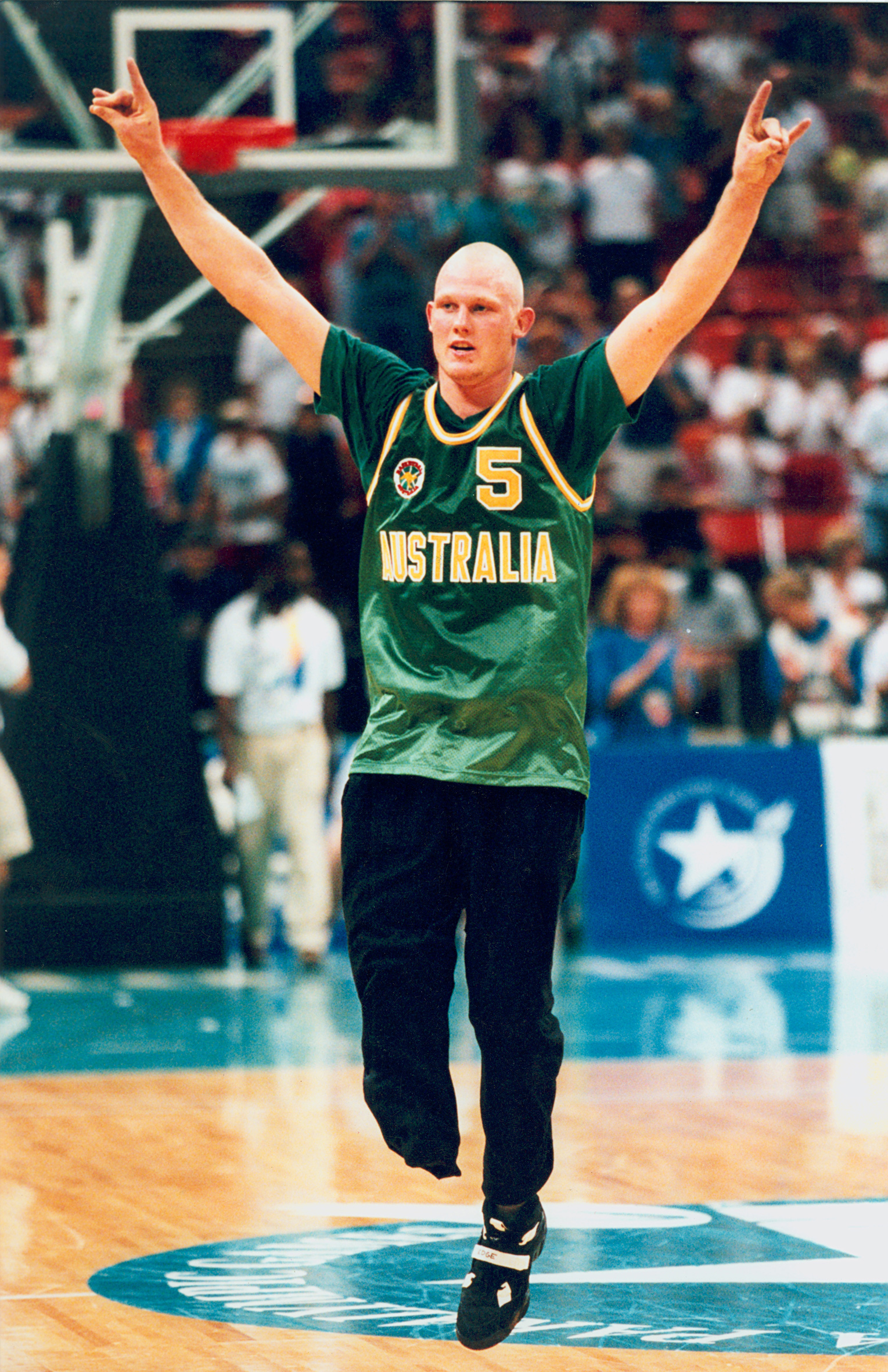
Sachs celebrating Australia's gold medal win at the 1996 Atlanta Paralympics

==== Australia ====
In 1998, Sachs competed for the West Sydney Slicks, where he helped guide the team to a league championship. From 1998 to 2001, he was the Australian National Wheelchair Basketball League's MVP, part of the All Star Five, and highest scorer. In 2001 he helped the West Sydney Razorbacks win the championship. In 2002, he was once again named to the NWBL All-Star Five. In 2008, Sachs played for the West Sydney Razorbacks.

==== Germany ====
In 2003, Sachs helped the RSC Rollis Zwickau become the German Cup Champions.

==== Italy ====
Sachs played with the Italian club side Tabu Cantu in 2001 and 2002. In 2001, he helped guide to team to a first-place finish in the European League and the following year, to a third-place finish.

==== Spain ====
In 2008, Sachs played for Fundacion Polaris World BSR.

==== Turkey ====
Sachs joined the Turkish team, Galatasaray Wheelchair Basketball Team for the 2009–10 season.

==== United States ====
Sachs played club wheelchair basketball for the Dallas Wheelchair Mavericks from 1998 to 2000. In all three years, the team won the league championships. In 1998 and 1999, he was named as part of the All Star Five in the US National Wheelchair Basketball Association.

== Recognition ==
In 1996, Sachs was awarded for the Most Outstanding Individual Performance at the Games by the Australian Paralympic Committee. In 1997 he received a Medal of the Order of Australia for his gold medal in Atlanta. He was a finalist for the Young Australian of the Year Award in 1997 and 1999. In 1999, he was named as one of Cosmopolitan's 30 most successful people under the age of thirty. He received an Australian Sports Medal in 2000. Sachs was inducted into the New South Wales Hall of Champions in November 2014. In September 2017, Basketball Australia announced that Sachs would be inducted into its Hall of Fame in 2018. In October 2017, Sachs was inducted into the Sport Australia Hall of Fame as an athlete member.
