= Wetzler =

Wetzler is a surname. Notable people with the name include:

- Alfréd Wetzler (1918–1988), Austro-Hungarian writer
- Ben Wetzler (born 1991), American baseball pitcher
- Gwen Wetzler, American producer, director and animator

== See also ==
- Wetzler Symphony Orchestra, American orchestra
- Vrba–Wetzler report, is a 40-page document about the Auschwitz concentration camp in German-occupied Poland during the Holocaust
