= Özgür Gürbulak =

Turkish wheelchair basketball player

No. 5 – Galatasaray
- Position: Forward
- League: Turkish Wheelchair Basketball Super League

Personal information
- Born: 30 April 1981 (age 45) İzmir, Turkey

Özgür Gürbulak (born 30 April 1981) is a Turkish wheelchair basketball player and Paralympian. He is a 4 point player competing for Galatasaray Wheelchair Basketball, and is part of Turkey men's national wheelchair basketball team.

Özgür played in the national team, which qualified to the 2012 Summer Olympics.

== Career history ==
In the beginning of the 2008 season, Özgür Gürbulak transferred from Saran Anadolu team to Galatasaray, which became European champion.

Gürbulak won the silver medal with the national team at the 2009 IWBF European Championship held in Adana, Turkey, and became "Top Scorer" of the tournament. He was awarded also "All-Star Team" member.

He played in the national team, which ranked eight at the 2010 Wheelchair Basketball World Championship held in Birmingham, United Kingdom . He was the second top scorer of the championship with 23.13 average PPG following Reo Fujimoto (4.5) from Japan.

At the 2012 Summer Paralympics, the national team, he was part of, ranked 7th.

He won the silver medal again at the 2013 IWBF Men's European Championship held on 26 June – 8 July in Frankfurt, Germany. He was also named to the "All-Star Team Men".

== Achievements ==
Year	Competition	Venue	Position	Notes
Representing Turkey
2009	IWBF Champions Cup		2nd place, silver medalist(s)	Galatasaray
2009	IWBF European Championship	Adana, Turkey	2nd place, silver medalist(s)	national team
2010	WB World Championship	Birmingham, United Kingdom	8th	national team
2011	IWBF Champions Cup		2nd place, silver medalist(s)	Galatasaray
2012	Summer Paralympics	London, United Kingdom	7th	national team
2013	IWBF European Championship	Frankfurt, Germany	2nd place, silver medalist(s)	national team
2014	WB World Championship	Incheon, South Korea	3rd place, bronze medalist(s)	national team
2015	IWBF European Championship	Worcester, United Kingdom	2nd place, silver medalist(s)	national team
2016	Summer Paralympics	Rio de Janeiro, Brazil	4th	national team
2017	IWBF European Championship	Tenerife, Spain	1st place, gold medalist(s)	national team

== Awards ==
Individual

- 2009 IWBF European Championship -"Top Scorer"
- 2009 IWBF European Championship -"All-Star Team"
- 2013 IWBF Men's European Championship -"All-Star Team"
- 2015 IWBF Men's European Championship -"All-Star Team"
- 2017 IWBF Men's European Championship -"All-Star Team"
