= Ferit Gümüş =

Turkish wheelchair basketball player

No. 13 – Galatasaray Wheelchair Basketball Team
- Position: Forward
- League: Turkish Wheelchair Basketball Super League

Personal information
- Born: 1 January 1981 (age 45) Kızıltepe, Mardin Province, Turkey

Ferit Gümüş (born 1 January 1981) is a Turkish wheelchair basketball player and Paralympian. He is a 3 point player competing for Galatasaray Wheelchair Basketball Team, and is part of Turkey men's national wheelchair basketball team.

Ferit played in the national team, which qualified to the 2012 Summer Paralympics.

== Career history ==
He played in the national team, which ranked eight at the 2010 Wheelchair Basketball World Championship held in Birmingham, United Kingdom .

At the 2012 Summer Paralympics, the national team, he was part of, ranked 7th.

== Achievements ==
| Year | Competition | Venue | Position | Notes |
Representing Turkey
| 2010 | WB World Championship | Birmingham, United Kingdom | 8th | national team |
| 2012 | Summer Paralympics | London, United Kingdom | 7th | national team |
| 2014 | WB World Championship | Incheon, South Korea | 3rd place, bronze medalist(s) | national team |
| 2015 | IWBF European Championship | Worcester, United Kingdom | 2nd place, silver medalist(s) | national team |
| 2016 | Summer Paralympics | Rio de Janeiro, Brazil | 4th | national team |
| 2017 | IWBF European Championship | Tenerife, Spain | 1st place, gold medalist(s) | national team |
