= Galatasaray S.K. (wheelchair basketball) =

Galatasaray Wheelchair Basketball Team
- Nickname: Engelsiz Aslanlar
- Leagues: Turkish Wheelchair Basketball Super League
- Founded: October 20, 2005
- History: 2005 - present
- Arena: Bahçelievler Engelliler Spor Salonu
- Capacity: 450
- Location: Istanbul, Turkey
- Team colors: Yellow and Red
- President: (Turkey) Dursun Özbek
- Head coach: (Turkey) Fikri Gündoğdu
- Championships: Turkish Super League (11); Turkish Second League (1); Champions Cup (5); Kitakyushu Cup (4); EuroCup 1 (3)
- Website: www.galatasaray.org
Home	Away

Galatasaray Wheelchair Basketball Team is the wheelchair basketball section of Galatasaray SK, a major sports club in Istanbul, Turkey. Galatasaray play matches in 450-seat arena, called the Bahçelievler Engelliler Spor Salonu.

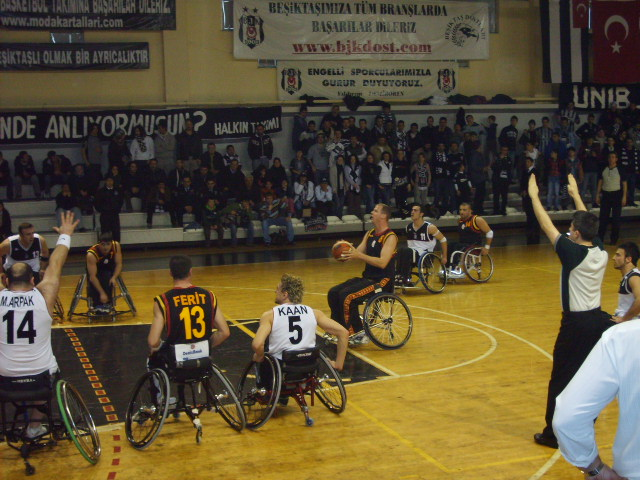
Galatasaray vs Beşiktaş - Feb 17, 2007

== History ==
Galatasaray Wheelchair Basketball Team hold the Turkish title and currently play in European Champions Cup organised by IWBF Europe. Having only been founded in 2005, the basketball team has already won the IWBF Champions League twice in a row, in years 2007-08 and 2008–09, making them one of the finest wheelchair teams in Europe. Galatasaray Wheelchair Basketball Team also won the Kitakyushu Champions Cup and became world champions in 2008, 2009, 2011 and 2013.

== Previous names ==
Period	Previous names
2005–2021	Galatasaray
2021–2024	Galatasaray Tunç Holding
2024–present	Galatasaray Fuzul

== Home arenas ==
- Ahmet Cömert Sport Hall (2005–2021)
- Beylikdüzü Spor Kompleksi (2021–2022)
- Bahçelievler Engelliler Spor Salonu (2022–present)

== Technical staff ==
As of 26 October 2025

Name	Job
Fikri Gündoğdu	Head Coach
Barış Ova	Physiotherapist
Akın Göl	Mechanician

== Current roster ==
As of 2 January 2026

No.	Nationality	Player	Date of birth and age	Class.	Pos.
0	Turkey	İsmail Ar	November 28, 1985 (age 40)	–	Guard
1	Turkey	Kemal Kaan Şafak	May 1, 1993 (age 33)	–	Shooting guard
4	Turkey	Havva Selvihan Gür	August 6, 1994 (age 32)	–	Forward
9	Turkey	Deniz Acar	January 9, 1976 (age 50)	–	Power forward
10	Turkey	Enes Bulut	February 7, 2001 (age 25)	4.0	Shooting guard
11	Turkey	Arda Albayrak	September 18, 2003 (age 23)	–	Guard
13	Turkey	Burak Ayğan	October 7, 2007 (age 18)	–	Forward
14	United Kingdom	Lee Shane Manning	January 11, 1990 (age 36)	–	Center
19	Poland / Turkey	Mateusz Filipski (Mete Sarı)	March 16, 1988 (age 38)	–	Shooting guard
21	Turkey	Ebru Akıcı	March 15, 1984 (age 42)	–	Forward
35	Turkey	Ferit Gümüş	January 10, 1981 (age 45)	–	Guard
69	Iran	Mahdi Abbasishotoryeh	October 23, 2002 (age 23)	–	Center
90	Turkey	Buğra Ergun	May 24, 2006 (age 20)	2.0	Forward

== Honours ==
=== Domestic competitions ===
- Turkish Wheelchair Basketball Super League:
  - Winners (11): (record) 2006–07, 2007–08, 2008–09, 2009–10, 2010–11, 2011–12, 2012–13, 2013–14, 2014–15, 2017–18, 2024–25
- Turkish Wheelchair Basketball First League:
  - Winners (1): 2005–06
- Sinan Erdem Wheelchair Basketball Cup:
  - Winners (2): 2006, 2008
- Antalya Kepez Tournament:
  - Winners (1): 2005

=== International competitions ===
- IWBF Champions Cup / IWBF Champions League:
  - Winners (5): 2008, 2009, 2011, 2013, 2014
  - Finalist (1): 2012
- Kitakyushu Champions Cup:
  - Winners (4): 2008, 2009, 2011, 2012
- André Vergauwen Cup / EuroCup 1:
  - Winner (3): 2016–17, 2017–18, 2024–25
  - Runners-up (1): 2025–26
  - Semi-finalist (1): 2006–07
- Chieti Tournament:
  - Winners (1): 2007
- South Eastern Europe (SEE) Championship Cup:
  - Winners (1): 2006

Galatasaray S.K.
Medal record

Wheelchair Basketball

Representing Galatasaray SK

South Eastern Europe (SEE) Championship Cup
Gold medal – first place	South Eastern Europe (SEE) Championship Cup	2006

Kitakyushu Champions Cup
Gold medal – first place	Kitakyushu Champions Cup	2008
Gold medal – first place	Kitakyushu Champions Cup	2009
Gold medal – first place	Kitakyushu Champions Cup	2011
Gold medal – first place	Kitakyushu Champions Cup	2012

IWBF Champions Cup
Gold medal – first place	IWBF Champions Cup	2008
Gold medal – first place	IWBF Champions Cup	2009
Gold medal – first place	IWBF Champions Cup	2011
Silver medal – second place	IWBF Champions Cup	2012
Gold medal – first place	IWBF Champions Cup	2013
Gold medal – first place	IWBF Champions Cup	2014

Turkish Wheelchair Basketball Super League
Gold medal – first place	TWB Super League	2007
Gold medal – first place	TWB Super League	2008
Gold medal – first place	TWB Super League	2009
Gold medal – first place	TWB Super League	2010
Gold medal – first place	TWB Super League	2011
Gold medal – first place	TWB Super League	2012
Gold medal – first place	TWB Super League	2013
Gold medal – first place	TWB Super League	2014

== Head coaches ==
Dates	Name
2005–2025	(Turkey) Remzi Sedat İncesu
2025–2026	(Turkey) Fikri Gündoğdu
2026–	(Turkey) Erdinç Kılıç

== See also ==
- See also Galatasaray S.K. (men's basketball)
- See also Galatasaray S.K. (women's basketball)
