= Matt Scott (basketball) =

American wheelchair basketball player (born 1985)

Personal information
- Born: March 27, 1985 (age 41) Detroit, Michigan, U.S.
- Listed height: 5 ft 8 in (1.73 m)
Medals
Men's wheelchair basketball
Representing United States
Paralympic Games
Gold medal – first place	2016 Rio de Janeiro	Team
Gold medal – first place	2020 Tokyo	Team
Bronze medal – third place	2012 London	Team
Parapan American Games
Gold medal – first place	2007 Rio de Janeiro	Team
Gold medal – first place	2011 Guadalajara	Team
Wheelchair Basketball World Championship
Silver medal – second place	2006 Amsterdam	Team
Bronze medal – third place	2010 Birmingham	Team

Matt Scott (born March 27, 1985) is an American wheelchair basketball player.

== Biography ==
Matt Scott was born in Detroit, Michigan, where he began playing wheelchair basketball with the Sterling Heights Challengers in the NWBA Junior Division. As a high schooler, he was on the gold medal-winning US team at the 2007 Parapan American Games in Brazil, where he was coached by Tracy Chynoweth, head coach of University of Wisconsin-Whitewater's college wheelchair basketball team. Scott played five years for the UW-Whitewater Warhawks in the NWBA College Division, winning championships three out of five years in 2004, 2005, and 2007. During his time at Whitewater, he competed in the 2004 Summer Paralympics and 2008 Summer Paralympics. He also won a silver medal at IWBF World Championship in 2006 in Amsterdam. He was nominated for the Best Male Athlete with a Disability ESPY Award in 2008. After college, Scott played professionally for Galatasaray S.K. in Istanbul, Turkey for six seasons from 2008 to 2014. In 2012, Matt Scott helped Team USA to a bronze medal in their 61–46 victory over Great Britain.

Scott continued his professional career with Comune Di Porto Torres in Italy for two seasons from 2014 to 2016, during which time Scott's game film of him making multiple three-point shots in front of a crowded arena went viral, prompting the sports blog The Undefeated to publish a write-up titled "Meet the Steph Curry of Wheelchair Basketball." Whistle Sports also shared the game film, which has garnered over 2.5M views on Facebook. Scott left Italy to play three seasons with the RSB Thuringia Bulls in Exleben, Germany. He competed in the 2016 Summer Paralympics, where Team USA defeated Spain 68–52 to win Team USA's first gold medal since 1988. Scott then returned to RSB Thuringia where he and Team USA teammate Jake Williams helped the Bulls win the IWBF Champions Cup in 2018 and 2019. In November 2018, Scott fell ill and contracted sepsis, leading to months-long hospitalization during which time he went into a coma for two weeks. He later recovered and returned to playing, but credits the episode for putting his life and basketball career in perspective.

During the COVID-19 pandemic, when it was uncertain whether the German RBBL would execute a season, Scott signed with CP Mideba in Badajoz, Spain. In 2021, he competed in the Tokyo Paralympic Games and helped secure a repeat gold medal for the United States in a 64–60 victory over Japan. Matt now resides in the Bay Area.

Scott is one of the most sought-after wheelchair basketball players by well-known brands. He was the first US Paralympian to star in a Nike, Inc. advertisement, "No Excuses", where the viewer is made unaware of his disability until the camera zooms out to show his basketball wheelchair at the end. Scott has also been a spokesperson for Travel Wisconsin, participated in a digital marketing campaign for the Apple Watch, and has been an athlete ambassador for Ralph Lauren.
