= Ahmet Cömert Sport Hall =

Indoor sporting arena located in Turkey

Ahmet Cömert Sport Hall Ahmet Cömert Spor Salonu
- Interactive map of Ahmet Cömert Sport Hall; Ahmet Cömert Spor Salonu
- Location: Ataköy, Bakırköy, Istanbul, Turkey
- Coordinates: 40.98714°N 28.85548°E
- Owner: Istanbul Youth and Sports Directorate
- Capacity: 3,500
- Surface: Parquet

Construction
- Opened: 1998; 28 years ago

Tenants
- Galatasaray Wheelchair Basketball; Dizdar Women's Basketball

Ahmet Cömert Sport Hall (Istanbul)

Ahmet Cömert Sport Hall (Turkish: Ahmet Cömert Spor Salonu) is a multi-purpose indoor sport venue located in Ataköy neighborhood of Bakırköy district in Istanbul, Turkey. The hall, with a capacity for 3,500 people, was built in 1998 within the Olympic complex. The venue has a parking lot capable of 150 cars. It is owned by the Youth and Sports Directorate of Istanbul Province (İstanbul GSM).

== Operation ==
Named in honor of the Turkish amateur boxer and sports official Ahmet Cömert (1926-1990), the sport hall hosts matches of the Turkish Basketball League and Turkish Wheelchair Basketball Super League. Since 2005, it is home to the Galatasaray Wheelchair Basketball Team. Other sports, which take place at Ahmet Cömert Sport Hall, include boxing, gymnastics, fencing, chess and as well as some individual sports.

The venue hosts amateur boxing competitions in memoriam of Ahmet Cömert, which are held annually at international level.

In October 2012, Dizdar Sport Club's women's basketball team, which entered the Turkish Women's Basketball 2nd League (TKB2L), play their home matches at the Ahmet Cömert Sport Hall.

It is set to host matches for the 2024 FIBA Under-17 Basketball World Cup.
