= Kitakyushu Champions Cup =

Wheelchair Basketball Championship in 2002

Kitakyushu Champions' Cup
- Sport: Wheelchair Basketball
- Founded: 2003
- Website: IWBF

The Kitakyushu Champions Cup commemorates the 2002 Gold Cup World Wheelchair Basketball Championships in Kitakyushu, which was the first to be held in Asia. 2011 tournament is the ninth to be held, demonstrating the vitality of our citizens and the united efforts of volunteers, and also promoting Kitakyushu City as a model barrier-free city. This tournament is being held as the first-ever world club team championships.

== Results ==
Years	Winner
2003	Australia (1)
2004	Japan (1)
2005	Australia (2)
2006	Team Ontario (1)
2007	Perth Wheelcats (1)
2008	Galatasaray SK (1)
2009	Galatasaray SK (2)
2010	RSV Lahn-Dill (1)
2011	Galatasaray SK (3)
2012	Galatasaray SK (4)
2013	Australia (3)
2014	日本
2015	イギリス
2016	日本
2017	日本
2018	オランダ
2019	日本
2020	中止
2021	中止

== See also ==
- Wheelchair basketball
- IWBF Champions Cup
- André Vergauwen Cup
- Willi Brinkmann Cup
- IWBF Challenge Cup
