= Beşiktaş JK (wheelchair basketball) =

Beşiktaş Wheelchair Basketball Team
- Nickname: Kara Kartallar (The Black Eagles)
- Leagues: TSB Süper Ligi; EuroCup 3
- Founded: Athletic Association: 1903; Basketball Club: 1933
- Arena: Süleyman Seba Sport Complex
- Capacity: 1,500
- Location: Istanbul, Turkey
- Team colors: White and Black
- President: Serdal Adalı
- Head coach: Kaan Dalay
- Website: besiktasjk.com.tr
Home	Away

Beşiktaş Wheelchair Basketball Team is the professional wheelchair basketball team of Beşiktaş J.K., which is a Turkish sports club from İstanbul. The club plays their home matches at Süleyman Seba Sport Complex.

== Current roster ==
As of 29 April 2026

Number	Player	Position
0	(Australia) Jaylen Brown	?
1	(Australia) Jontee Brown	?
2	(Ivory Coast) Said Camara	Forward
3	(Turkey) Kaan Dalay	Guard/Forward
4	(Turkey) Maşide Çakır	Forward
7	(Turkey) Bülent Yılmaz	Guard/Forward
8	(Turkey) Onur Ayhan Eroğlu	Guard
10	(Turkey) Zafer Gültekin	Guard
17	(Turkey) Semih Görkem Kıyar	Forward
28	(Turkey) Hüseyin Avni Dalman	Forward
33	(Turkey) Bulut Atabey	Center
47	(Turkey) İbrahim Halil Doğantekin	?
76	(Turkey) İlhan Tuncay	Center

== Achievements ==
=== Domestic ===
- Turkish Wheelchair Basketball Super League:
  - Winners (4): 2004–05, 2005–06, 2015–16, 2016–17

=== International ===
- André Vergauwen Cup:
  - Winner (1): 2011
  - Finalist (2): 2010, 2014, 2019
  - Third Place (2): 2009, 2018
- Willi Brinkmann Cup:
  - Winner (1): 2012
- EuroCup 3:
  - Winner (1): 2026
