= Turkish Wheelchair Basketball Super League =

Turkish Wheelchair Basketball Super League Türkiye Tekerlekli Sandalye Basketbol Süper Ligi
- Sport: Wheelchair Basketball
- Founded: 1997
- No. of teams: 14
- Country: Turkey
- Most recent champion: Fenerbahçe
- Website: TBESF

The Turkish Wheelchair Basketball Super League (Turkish: Türkiye Tekerlekli Sandalye Basketbol Süper Ligi, TTSB Süper Ligi) is the top-flight professional league for wheelchair basketball teams in Turkey with men and women players. Established in 1997, it is governed by the Turkey Disabled Sports Federation (Turkish: Türkiye Bedensel Engelliler Spor Federasyonu, TBESF).

Ten teams compete annually in the league. The last placed two teams are relegated to a lower league, the Turkish Wheelchair Basketball First League (Turkish: Türkiye Tekerlekli Sandalye Basketbol Birinci Ligi, TTSB 1. Ligi) while the two top ranked teams of the lower league are promoted to the Super League. Galatasaray Wheelchair is with seven consecutive times the most successful team.

== Winners ==
Season	Winner
1996–97	İskenderun Belediyespor
1997–98	İskenderun Belediyespor
1998–99	Engelli Yıldızlar SK
1999–2000	Engelli Yıldızlar SK
2000–01	İzmir Büyükşehir Belediyesi
2001–02	İzmir Büyükşehir Belediyesi
2002–03	İzmir Büyükşehir Belediyesi
2003–04	İzmir Büyükşehir Belediyesi
2004–05	Beşiktaş
2005–06	Beşiktaş
2006–07	Galatasaray
2007–08	Galatasaray
2008–09	Galatasaray
2009–10	Galatasaray
2010–11	Galatasaray
2011–12	Galatasaray
2012–13	Galatasaray
2013–14	Galatasaray
2014–15	Galatasaray
2015–16	Beşiktaş
2016–17	Beşiktaş
2017–18	Galatasaray
2018–19	1907 Fenerbahçe Engelli Yıldızlar SK
2019–20	Canceled due to the COVID-19 pandemic in Turkey
2020–21	İzmir Büyükşehir Belediyesi
2021–22	Fenerbahçe
2022–23	Fenerbahçe
2023–24	Fenerbahçe
2024–25	Galatasaray
2025–26	Fenerbahçe

== Performance by team ==
Team	# of Wins	Winning years
Galatasaray	11	2007, 2008, 2009, 2010, 2011, 2012, 2013, 2014, 2015, 2018, 2025
Fenerbahçe	7	1999, 2000, 2019, 2022, 2023, 2024, 2026
İzmir Büyükşehir Belediyesi	5	2001, 2002, 2003, 2004, 2021
Beşiktaş	4	2005, 2006, 2016, 2017
İskenderun Belediyespor	2	1997, 1998

== Teams by season ==
2025–26 season

- Antalya Büyükşehir Belediye Spor Kulübü
- Bağcılar Belediyesi Engelliler Spor Kulübü
- Balıkesir Büyükşehir Belediyespor
- Beşiktaş
- Fenerbahçe
- Galatasaray
- Gazişehir Gaziantep
- İskenderun Belediyesi Engelliler Spor Kulübü
- İzmir Büyükşehir Belediyesi Gençlik ve Spor Kulübü
- Karabük Demir Kartal Spor Kulübü
- Ordu Büyükşehir Belediyesi Engelliler Spor Kulübü
- Şanlıurfa Bedensel Engelliler Spor Kulübü
- Şanlıurfa Büyükşehir Belediye Engelliler Spor Kulübü
- TSK Rehabilitasyon Merkezi Engelliler Spor Kulübü

== See also ==
- Wheelchair basketball
- IWBF Champions Cup
- André Vergauwen Cup
- Willi Brinkmann Cup
- IWBF Challenge Cup
- Kitakyushu Champions Cup
