= CP Mideba =

Mideba Extremadura
- Leagues: División de Honor
- Founded: 1982
- Location: Badajoz, Extremadura, Spain
- Team colors: White and green
- Championships: 1 Willi Brinkmann Cup; 1 Challenge Cup
- Website: midebaextremadura.es
Home	Away

Club Polideportivo Minusválidos Deportistas de Badajoz, more commonly known as Mideba Extremadura, is a wheelchair basketball team based in Badajoz, Extremadura, Spain.

== History ==
Mideba was founded in 1982 as a way to motivate people with physical disabilities. The club made its debut in División de Honor in 1995 and played continuously since that year.

Few years later, Mideba started to play in European competitions, where it achieved the Willi Brinkmann Cup in 2000 and the Challenge Cup in 2013.

== Season by season ==
Season	League	Pos	Copa del Rey	European competitions	
1996–97	Div. Honor			3 Willi Brinkmann Cup	RU
1997–98	Div. Honor			3 Willi Brinkmann Cup	RU
1998–99	Div. Honor			3 Willi Brinkmann Cup	3rd
1999–00	Div. Honor	3rd	Quarterfinalist	3 Willi Brinkmann Cup	C
2000–01	Div. Honor	4th	—	2 André Vergauwen Cup	QR
2001–02	Div. Honor	5th	Quarterfinalist	3 Willi Brinkmann Cup	3rd
2002–03	Div. Honor	5th	—	2 André Vergauwen Cup	4th
2003–04	Div. Honor	4th	3rd position	—	
2004–05	Div. Honor	2nd	4th position	2 André Vergauwen Cup	3rd
2005–06	Div. Honor	2nd	Quarterfinalist	—	
2006–07	Div. Honor	5th	Quarterfinalist	1 Champions Cup	7th
2007–08	Div. Honor	6th	4th position	3 Willi Brinkmann Cup	5th
2008–09	Div. Honor	5th	Quarterfinalist	3 Willi Brinkmann Cup	RU
2009–10	Div. Honor	5th	Quarterfinalist	2 André Vergauwen Cup	3rd
2010–11	Div. Honor	8th	Quarterfinalist	3 Willi Brinkmann Cup	5th
2011–12	Div. Honor	3rd	Quarterfinalist	—	
2012–13	Div. Honor	4th	Runner-up	4 Challenge Cup	C
2013–14	Div. Honor	3rd	—	4 Challenge Cup	3rd
2014–15	Div. Honor	3rd	4th position	—	
2015–16	Div. Honor	7th	Quarterfinalist	3 Willi Brinkmann Cup	4th
2016–17	Div. Honor	6th	Quarterfinalist	—	
2017–18	Div. Honor	8th	3rd position	4 Challenge Cup	4th
