= Spanish Wheelchair Basketball League =

Top-flight professional league for wheelchair basketball teams in Spain

División de Honor de Baloncesto en Silla de Ruedas
- Sport: Wheelchair Basketball
- Founded: 1971
- No. of teams: 12
- Country: Spain
- Most recent champion: CD Ilunion
- Most titles: CD Ilunion (19 titles)
- Relegation to: Primera División
- Domestic cup: Copa del Rey
- Website: bsr.feddf.es

The Spanish Wheelchair Basketball League, in Spanish called División de Honor de Baloncesto en Silla de Ruedas is the top-flight professional league for wheelchair basketball teams in Spain with men and women players. It is governed by the Spanish Sports Federation for People with Physical Disabilities (Spanish: Federación Española de Deportes de Personas con Discapacidad Físicos, FEDDF).

Founded in 1971 as Primera División it changed its name to División de Honor in 1992.

== Competition format ==
Ten teams compete annually in the league, played with a double round-robin format. The Spanish league the only one of the major leagues in Europe without playoffs.

The last two teams are relegated to a lower league, the Spanish Wheelchair Basketball First División while the two top ranked teams of the lower league are promoted to the División de Honor. CD Ilunion, formerly called CD Fundosa ONCE is the most successful team.

== 2024-25 teams ==
Team	Location
Amiab Puertollano BSR	Puertollano
Amivel Reyes Gutiérrez	Vélez-Málaga
Bidaideak Bilbao BSR	Bilbao
BSR Amiab Albacete	Albacete
CD Ilunion	Madrid
Econy Gran Canaria	Las Palmas
Fundación Aliados	Valladolid
Iberconsa Amfiv	Vigo
Menarini Joventut	Badalona
Mideba Extremadura	Badajoz
Rehatrans Getafe BSR	Getafe
UCAM Murcia BSR	Murcia

== Latest winners ==
Despite the league was created in 1971, there are only reliable sources of results and league tables since 1989, when it started to be sponsored by ONCE.

Season	Winner	Runner-up
1989–90	Ademi Málaga	
1990–91	Ademi Málaga	
1991–92	CD ONCE Andalucía	
1992–93	CD ONCE Andalucía	
1993–94	CD ONCE Andalucía	
1994–95	CD Fundosa ONCE	
1995–96	CD Fundosa ONCE	
1996–97	CD Fundosa ONCE	BSR Melilla
1997–98	CD Fundosa ONCE	
1998–99	CD Fundosa ONCE	
1999–00	CD Fundosa ONCE	ADM Econy Gran Canaria
2000–01	CD Fundosa ONCE	CD ONCE Andalucía
2001–02	CD Fundosa ONCE	CD ONCE Andalucía
2002–03	CD ONCE Andalucía	CD Fundosa ONCE
2003–04	CD ONCE Andalucía	ADM Econy Gran Canaria
2004–05	CD ONCE Andalucía	CP Mideba
2005–06	CD ONCE Andalucía	CP Mideba
2006–07	CD Fundosa ONCE	Fundación Polaris World BSR
2007–08	CD ONCE Andalucía	CD Fundosa ONCE
2008–09	CD Fundosa ONCE	CD ONCE Andalucía
2009–10	CD ONCE Andalucía	CD Fundosa ONCE
2010–11	BSR Valladolid	CD Fundosa ONCE
2011–12	CD Fundosa ONCE	CID Casa Murcia Getafe
2012–13	CD Fundosa ONCE	BSR Valladolid
2013–14	CD Fundosa ONCE	Bilbao BSR
2014–15	CD Ilunion	Amiab Albacete
2015–16	CD Ilunion	Amiab Albacete
2016–17	CD Ilunion	Amiab Albacete
2017–18	Amiab Albacete	Bidaideak Bilbao
2018–19	CD Ilunion	Amiab Albacete
2019–20	League cancelled due to coronavirus pandemic	
2020–21	Bidaideak Bilbao	Amiab Albacete
2021–22	Amiab Albacete	CP Mideba
2022–23	Amiab Albacete	CD Ilunion
2023–24	Amiab Albacete	CD Ilunion
2024–25	CD Ilunion	Amiab Albacete
2025–26	CD Ilunion	Amivel Reyes Gutiérrez

== See also ==
- Wheelchair basketball
- IWBF Champions Cup
- André Vergauwen Cup
- Willi Brinkmann Cup
- IWBF Challenge Cup
