= EuroLeague =

Highest-tier professional men's club basketball competition in Europe

- Organising body: Euroleague Basketball
- Founded: FIBA era 14 December 1957; 68 years ago Euroleague Basketball era 10 October 2000; 26 years ago
- First season: FIBA European Champions Cup; 1958; FIBA European League; 1991–92; FIBA EuroLeague; 1996–97; FIBA SuproLeague; 2000–01; Euroleague; 2000–01; EuroLeague; 2016–17
- Region: Europe
- Number of teams: 20
- Level on pyramid: 1
- Supercup: EuroLeague SuperCup
- Related competitions: EuroCup (2nd tier)
- Current champions: (Greece) Olympiacos (4th title) (2025–26)
- Most championships: (Spain) Real Madrid (11 titles)
- CEO: Chus Bueno
- President: Dejan Bodiroga
- TV partners: euroleague.tv
- Website: euroleaguebasketball.net
- 2026–27 EuroLeague

The EuroLeague is a Europe's professional basketball club competition. The league is widely recognised as the top-tier and the most prestigious men's basketball league in Europe. The league consists of 20 teams, of which 16 are given long-term licences and wild cards, making the league a semi-closed league. The league was first organized by FIBA in 1958, subsequently by ULEB in 2000 and then solely by Euroleague Basketball.

The competition was introduced in 1958 as the FIBA European Champions Cup (renamed the FIBA EuroLeague in 1996), which operated under FIBA's umbrella until Euroleague Basketball was created for the 2000–01 season. The FIBA European Champions Cup and the EuroLeague are considered to be the same competition, with the change of name being simply a re-branding. From 2010 to 2025, it was sponsored by Turkish Airlines.

The EuroLeague is one of the most popular indoor sports leagues in the world, with an average attendance of 10,383 for league matches in the 2023–24 season. This was the fifth-highest of any professional indoor sports league in the world (the highest outside the United States), and the second-highest of any professional basketball league in the world, only behind the National Basketball Association (NBA).

The EuroLeague title has been won by 22 clubs, 15 of which have won it more than once. The most successful club in the competition is Real Madrid, with 11 titles while CSKA Moscow follow with 8 and Panathinaikos with 7. The latter is also the competition's most successful club during its modern era since 2001 with 5 trophies, while Virtus Bologna was the first ever winner in 2000–01.

FIBA had organised 44 editions with Real Madrid being the most decorated club during the FIBA era (1958–2001) with 8 titles. Maccabi Tel Aviv was the competition's last ever champion during the FIBA era (1958-2001).

== History ==
=== FIBA era and the 2000 split ===
The FIBA European Champions Cup was originally established by FIBA and it operated from 1958 until the summer of 2001. Since the 1987–88 FIBA European Champions Cup and until 2001, the winner was decided by a final four.

The 1999–00 season was the last before the split of 2000 between FIBA and various top clubs backed by ULEB who launched its own top-tier competition. In the summer of 2000 the Euroleague Basketball was found.

FIBA had previously used the EuroLeague name for the competition since 1996, but it had never trademarked the name. As FIBA had no legal recourse on the usage of the name, ULEB grasped the opportunity and started a new league under the name of Euroleague', while FIBA renamed its top-tier competition the FIBA SuproLeague. Thus, the 2000–2001 season started with two top European professional club basketball competitions: FIBA SuproLeague (renamed from FIBA EuroLeague) and EuroLeague by ULEB.

Top clubs were split between the two leagues: Panathinaikos, Maccabi Elite Tel Aviv, CSKA Moscow and Efes Pilsen stayed with FIBA, while Olympiacos, Kinder Bologna, Real Madrid Teka, FC Barcelona, Paf Wennington Bologna, PAOK, Žalgiris, Benetton Treviso, AEK and Tau Cerámica joined ULEB. The first Euroleague champion of the new era in 2000-01 was decided by a best of five series.

=== ULEB era (2001–2009) ===
In May 2001, Europe had two continental champions, Maccabi of the FIBA SuproLeague and Kinder Bologna of the ULEB Euroleague. Both organizations realized the need to come up with a unified competition and Euroleague Basketball negotiated terms and dictated proceedings which FIBA agreed to their terms. As a result, European club competition was fully integrated under Euroleague Basketball's umbrella and teams that competed in the FIBA SuproLeague during the 2000–01 season joined it as well.

The authority in European professional basketball was divided over club-country lines. FIBA stayed in charge of national team competitions (like the FIBA EuroBasket, the FIBA World Cup, and the Summer Olympics), while ULEB and Euroleague Basketball took over the major European club competition, establishing 3-year licences with top clubs - not based on sporting merit.

From that point on, FIBA's Korać Cup and Saporta Cup competitions lasted one more season and then Euroleague Basketball launched the ULEB Cup, now known as the EuroCup, following another major disagreement with FIBA who launched its own two competitions as an answer.

=== Euroleague Basketball (2009) ===
In 2009, Euroleague Properties S.A. (EP) was created and the competition's company Euroleague Basketball under Jordi Bertomeu took full control, limiting ULEB's role. During all this period many top European clubs had permanent presence in the competition via licences and regardless of their domestic performances.

In October 2015, FIBA tried to take control back, tempting 8 top European clubs (Panathinaikos, Olympiakos, Real Madrid, Barcelona, Maccabi Tel Aviv, CSKA Moscow, Fenerbahce and Efes Pilsen) to sign long-term licenses with the Federation in a 16-team brand new European league called the FIBA Basketball Champions League in a round-robin format (the other 8 spots would be decided on domestic performances). The clubs rejected the proposal, but they came up with an almost identical plan a few weeks later.

=== League era (2016–present) ===
In November 2015, Euroleague Basketball and IMG agreed on a 10-year joint venture. Both Euroleague Basketball and IMG will manage the commercial operation, and the management of all global rights covering both media and marketing. The deal was worth €630 million guaranteed over 10 years, with projected revenues reaching €900 million. Along with the deal the league changed into a true league format, with 16 teams playing each other team in the regular season followed by the playoffs. The A-licensed clubs were assured of participation for the following ten years in the new format.

After the new format of the EuroLeague and FIBA implementing national team windows, a conflict between the two organizations emerged. EuroLeague has been criticised by FIBA as well as several national federations for creating a 'closed league' and ignoring the principle of meritocracy. In July 2019, EuroLeague announced that from the 2019–20 season there will be no direct access to the league through domestic leagues anymore, effectively making it a closed league. In the same season, the league was expanded to include 18 teams in total.

The EuroLeague saw increasing influence from the Middle East during the 2020s. The league had another milestone event in 2025, when it hosted the Final Four in Abu Dhabi. The league further expanded to 20 teams in the 2025–26 season. As part of the expansion, Dubai Basketball was given a 5-year license, thus becoming the first team from outside of Europe (after Israeli teams Maccabi Tel Aviv and Hapoel Jerusalem, and alongside Hapoel Tel Aviv) to play in the competition.

=== Title sponsorship ===
From 2010 to 2025, the EuroLeague was sponsored by Turkish Airlines. Under a five-year €15 million agreement beginning with the 2010–11 season, the competition was renamed the Turkish Airlines EuroLeague. The agreement included an option to extend the partnership for another five years, which was activated in October 2013, extending the deal until 2020.

On July 1, 2025, the Turkish Airlines naming partnership ended. EuroLeague Basketball subsequently reverted to the name EuroLeague, without a title sponsor.

On September 24, 2025, EuroLeague Basketball announced a four-year partnership with the Abu Dhabi Department of Culture and Tourism and Etihad Airways, who became main partners of EuroLeague Basketball. The partnership includes Experience Abu Dhabi and Etihad Airways branding across EuroLeague and EuroCup games, including arena visibility, live broadcasts and team jerseys, while Etihad Airways and the Abu Dhabi Department of Culture and Tourism are also the Final Four presenting partners.

=== Names of the competition ===
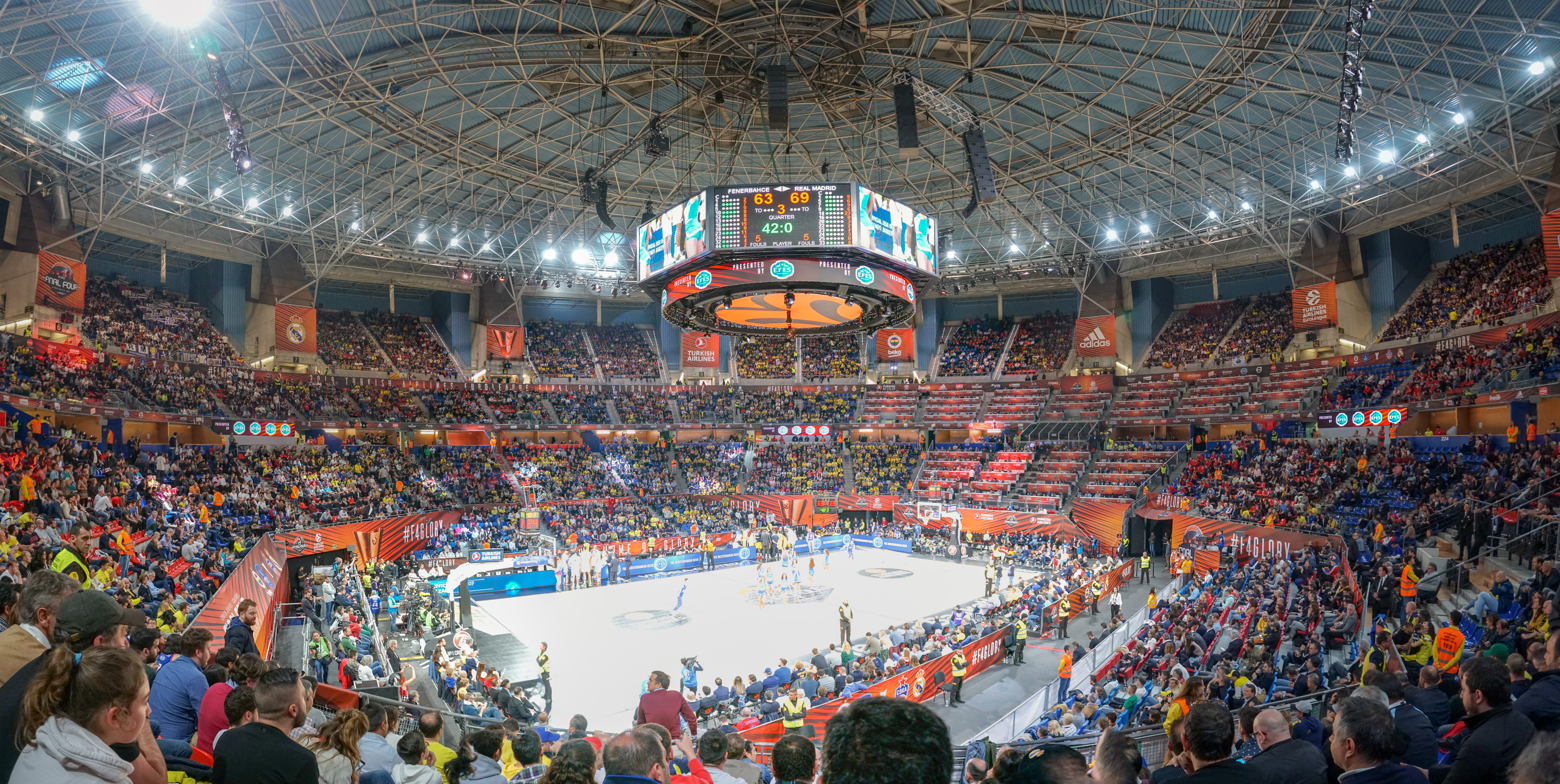
A EuroLeague game in 2019.

- FIBA era: (1958–2001)
  - FIBA European Champions Cup: (1958–1991)
  - FIBA European League: (1991–1996)
  - FIBA EuroLeague: (1996–2000)
  - FIBA SuproLeague: (2000–2001)
- Euroleague Basketball era: (2000–present)
  - ULEB Euroleague: (2000–2001)
  - Euroleague: (2001–2016)
  - EuroLeague: (2016–present)

*There were two competitions during the 2000–01 season. The SuproLeague, which was organized by FIBA, and the Euroleague, which was organized by ULEB and Euroleague Basketball.

=== Licences ===
The main difference between the competition run by FIBA Europe and the modern one since 2000 has been the licenses that guaranteed a club's participation in the Euroleague regardless of their performance in their national championship. The 3-year guaranteed participation was granted by an A-license. In 2009 the A-Licenses granted were 13, while in 2012 they became 14.

Until 2015, many major clubs would compete with a 3-year licence, while others would get a wild card or a B-License for one year. In 2015, 11 clubs signed long-term licenses with the Euroleague Basketball (until 2026) and they also became the company's shareholders leaving only 5 spots to other teams to participate. In 2021–22 season, ASVEL and Bayern Munich were added to the shareholders' group taking the number to 13. As of the 2025–26 season, the Euroleague Basketball offers 3-year licenses to clubs other than the 13 shareholders with the fee being 5 million euros in total (about 1.7 million euros per year). The EuroLeague Board of Directors, composed of the 13 shareholders, is responsible to evaluate each individual request of a club for a 3-year license. In 2025, Euroleague Basketball granted 3-year licenses (until 2028) to the following clubs:

- KK Crvena zvezda
- KK Partizan
- Virtus Bologna
- Valencia Basket
- Dubai Basketball (5-year license, until 2030)

A-Licenses history

Club	First License	Second License	Third License	Fourth License	Fifth License	Shareholder
Olympiacos B.C.	2000–2003	2003–2006	2006–2009	2009–2012	2012–2015	2015–2026
Panathinaikos B.C.	2001–2003	-	2006–2009	2009–2012	2012–2015	2015–2026
Anadolu Efes S.K.	2001–2003	2003–2006	2006–2009	2009–2012	2012–2015	2015–2026
Maccabi Tel Aviv B.C.	2001–2003		2006–2009	2009–2012	2012–2015	2015–2026
Real Madrid Baloncesto	2000-2003	-	2006–2009	2009–2012	2012–2015	2015–2026
Saski Baskonia	-	2003–2006	2006–2009	2009–2012	2012–2015	2015–2026
FC Barcelona Bàsquet	2000–2003	2003–2006	2006–2009	2009–2012	2012–2015	2015–2026
Fenerbahçe S.K.	-	-	2006–2009	2009–2012	2012–2015	2015–2026
BC Žalgiris	2001–2003	2003–2006		2009–2012	2012–2015	2015–2026
PBC CSKA Moscow	2001–2003	2003–2006		2009–2012	2012–2015	2015–2026
KK Olimpija	2000–2003	2003–2006	2006–2009	2009–2012	-	-
Virtus Roma	-	-	-	2009-2011	2012–2015	-
ASVEL Basket	2001–2003	2003–2006	-	-	-	2021–2026
Mens Sana Siena	-	2003–2006	2006–2009	2009–2012	2012-2014	-
Unicaja Malaga	-		2006–2009	2009–2012	2012–2015	-
Prokom Trefl Sopot	-	-	-	2009–2012	2012-2015	-
EA7 Milano	-	-	-	-	2012-2015	2015–2026
Ülker G.S.K.	2001–2003	2003–2006	-	-	-	-
KK Cibona	2000–2003	2003–2006	2006–2009	-	-	-
AEK B.C.	-	2003–2006	-	-	-	-
Élan Béarnais Pau-Orthez	2001–2003	2003–2006	-	-	-	-
Le Mans Sarthe Basket	-	-	2006–2009	-	-	-
KK Zadar	2000–2002	-	-	-	-	-
KK Budućnost	2000–2003	-	-	-	-	-
Virtus Bologna	2000–2002	-	-	-	-	-
Fortitudo Bologna	2000–2003	2003–2006	-	-	-	-
Benetton Treviso	2000–2003	2003–2006	-	-	-	-
Opel Skyliners	2000–2002	-	-	-	-	-
London Towers	2000–2002	-	-	-	-	-
Alba Berlin	2001–2003	-	-	-	-	-
FC Bayern Munich	-	-	-	-	-	2021–2026

1. Real Madrid: The Spanish club lost its A-licence in 2003 due to poor results.
2. A-licence revoked: Euroleague Basketball suspended the A-license of Virtus Roma after Roma finished in 9th position in the 2010–11 Lega Basket Serie A, awarding a wild card entry to EA7 Milano instead.
3. EA7 Milano : EA7 Milano had a two-year A license, awarded in June 2012. Then the A-licence of EA7 Milano expired in June 2014, but Euroleague confirmed it as an A-licensed team.
4. Asseco Prokom : Asseco Prokom lost its A license in 2013, as it was the last qualified in the A licensed team tanking. The license was converted into a wildcard.
5. Siena: Montepaschi Siena did not play in the 2014-15 Euroleague, due to financial troubles.

Wild cards history

Club	Period
Saint Petersburg Lions	2000–2001
Śląsk Wrocław	2003–2004
Mens Sana Siena	2002–2003
Darüşşafaka Basketbol	2015–2017
FC Bayern Munich	2015–2016, 2019-2020
SIG Strasbourg	2015–2016
Lokomotiv Kuban	2015–2016
Alba Berlin	2021–2023, 2023–2025
BC Zenit Saint Petersburg	2019–2020, 2021-2022
KK Crvena zvezda	2021–2022, 2023–2024, 2025–2028
KK Partizan	2022–2023, 2024–2025, 2025–2028
Valencia Basket	2022–2023
Virtus Bologna	2023–2025, 2025–2028
ASVEL Basket	2020–2021
AS Monaco	2024–2026
Dubai Basketball	2025–2030

== Competition systems ==
=== Tournament systems ===
The EuroLeague operated under a tournament system, from its inaugural 1958 season, through the 2015–16 season.

- FIBA European Champions Cup (1958 to 1986–87): The champions of European national domestic leagues, and the then current European Champions Cup title holders (except for the 1986–87 season), competing against each other, played in a tournament system. The league culminated with either a single game final, or a 2-game aggregate score finals (3 games if needed to break a tie).
- FIBA European Champions Cup (1987–88 to 1990–91): The champions of European national domestic leagues, competing against each other, played in a tournament system. The league culminated with a Final Four.
- FIBA European League (1991–92 to 1995–96): The champions of the European national domestic leagues, the then current European League title holders, along with some of the other biggest teams from the most important national domestic leagues, played in a tournament system. The league culminated with a Final Four.
- FIBA EuroLeague (1996–97 to 1999–00): The champions of the best European national domestic leagues, along with some of the other biggest teams from the most important national domestic leagues, played in a tournament system. The league culminated with a Final Four.
- *Euroleague (2000–01): Some of the European national domestic league champions, and some of the runners-up from various national domestic leagues, played in a tournament system. The league culminated with a best of 5 playoff finals.
- *FIBA SuproLeague (2000–01): Some of the European national domestic league champions, and some of the runners-up from various national domestic leagues, played in a tournament system. The league culminated with a Final Four.
- Euroleague (2001–02 to 2015–16): The champions of the best European national domestic leagues, along with some of the other biggest teams from the most important national domestic leagues, played in a tournament system. The league culminated with a Final Four.

*There were two competitions during the 2000–01 season. The SuproLeague, which was organized by FIBA, and the Euroleague, which was organized by Euroleague Basketball.

=== League system ===
Starting with the 2016–17 season, the EuroLeague operates under a league format.

- EuroLeague (2016–17 to present): The champions of the best European national domestic leagues, along with some of the other biggest teams from the most important national domestic leagues, playing in a true European-wide league system format. The league culminates with a Final Four.

== Format ==
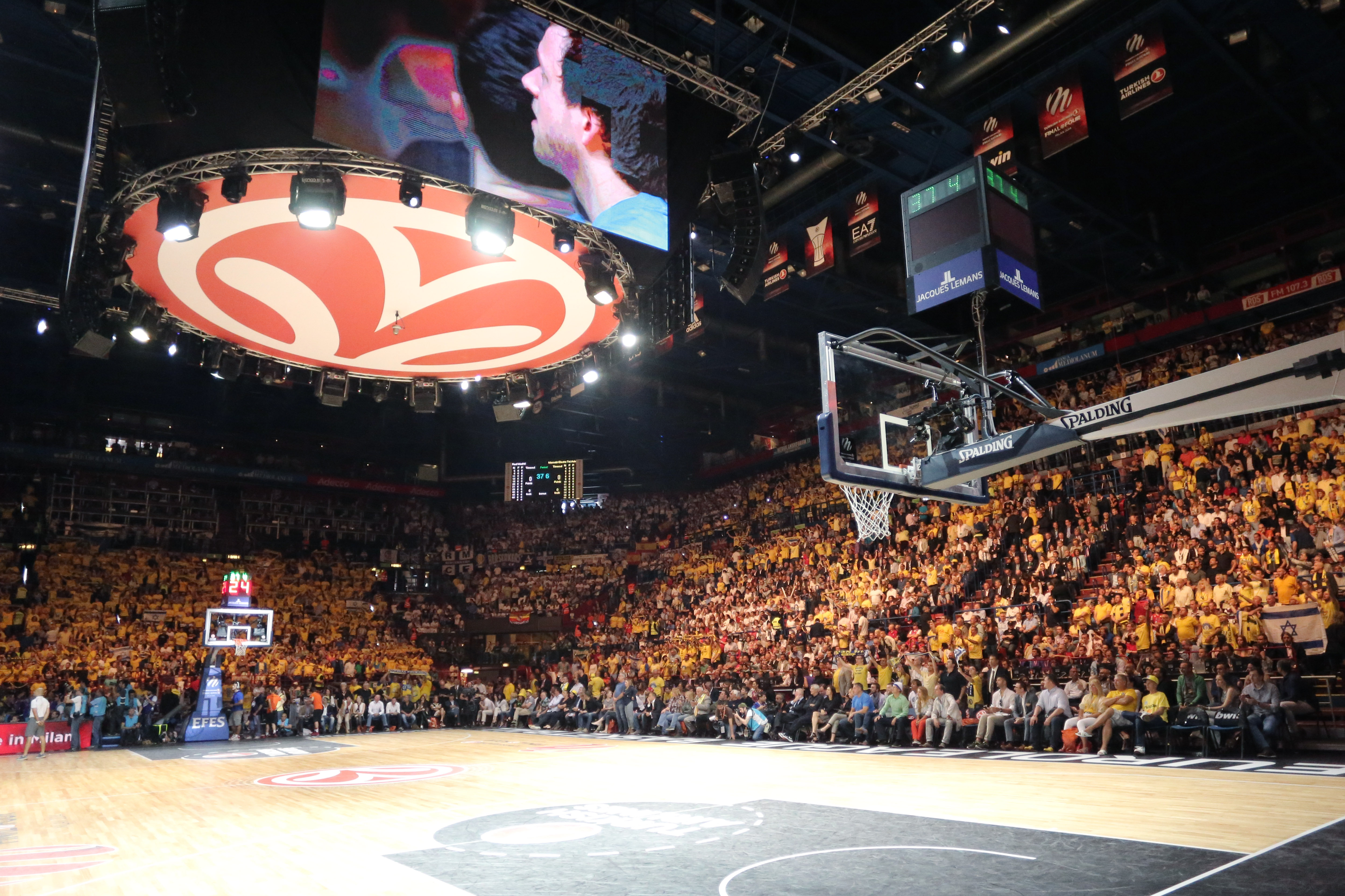
The setting of the 2014 EuroLeague Final Four in Milan

Starting with the 2016–17 season, the EuroLeague is made up of a fixed number of teams, with each playing every other team twice (once at home and once away) in a double round robin league regular season. A total of 16 teams competed in the regular season for the first three iterations of this new format (2016-17, 2017–18 and 2018–19 season). The league was expanded to accommodate 18 teams for the next six seasons (from 2019-20 to 2024-25). Following the second expansion during the 2025-26 season, 20 teams are currently competing in the league.

The top eight placed teams at the end of the regular season advance to playoffs, each playing a five-game playoff series against a single opponent. The regular season standings are used to determine which teams play each other, and in each pairing the higher placed team has home-court advantage in the series, playing three of the five games at home. The winners of each of the four playoff series advance to the Final Four, held at a predetermined site. The Final Four features two semi-finals, a third place game, and the championship game, all on the same weekend.

Each team plays a maximum 45 games per season: 38 in the regular season, a maximum of 5 during the playoffs, and 2 in the Final Four.

=== Qualification ===
Currently (and since the suspension of Russian teams because of the Russian invasion of Ukraine), 12 out of the 18 EuroLeague places are held by licensed clubs that have long-term licenses with Euroleague Basketball, and are members of the Shareholders Executive Board. These twelve licensed clubs are:

- (Turkey) Anadolu Efes
- (France) ASVEL
- (Spain) Baskonia
- (Germany) Bayern Munich
- (Spain) FC Barcelona
- (Turkey) Fenerbahçe
- (Israel) Maccabi Tel Aviv
- (Italy) Olimpia Milano
- (Greece) Olympiacos
- (Greece) Panathinaikos
- (Spain) Real Madrid
- (Lithuania) Žalgiris

The remaining six EuroLeague places are held by associated clubs that have annual licences, of which one has a two-year wild card, three have one-year wild-cards and two are the finalists of the previous season's 2nd-tier European competition, the EuroCup. From the 2020–21 season, however, if the better of the two teams from the EuroCup makes it to the playoffs, it keeps the place for the following year.

== Current clubs ==
These are the teams that participate in the 2026–27 EuroLeague season:

Location of teams in 2026–27 EuroLeague
Location of teams from the Middle East in 2026–27 EuroLeague

Team	Home city	Arena	Capacity	Kit manufacturer	Last season
(Turkish Basketball Federation) Anadolu Efes	Istanbul	Basketball Development Center	10,000	GSA	19th
(Italian Basketball Federation) Armani Olimpia Milan	Milan	Unipol Forum	12,700	EA7	14th
(Spanish Basketball Federation) Barcelona	Barcelona	Palau Blaugrana	7,585	Nike	9th
(German Basketball Federation) Bayern Munich	Munich	SAP Garden	11,500	Adidas	13th
(Turkish Basketball Federation) Beşiktaş	Istanbul	Basketball Development Center	10,000	Umbro	—
(Basketball Federation of Serbia) Crvena zvezda Meridianbet	Belgrade	Belgrade Arena	18,386	Adidas	10th
(United Arab Emirates Basketball Association) Dubai Basketball	Dubai	Coca-Cola Arena	17,000	Adidas	11th
(Turkish Basketball Federation) Fenerbahçe Tarfin	Istanbul	Ülker Sports and Event Hall	13,000	Adidas	4th
(Israeli Basketball Association) Hapoel IBI Tel Aviv	Tel Aviv			Adidas	6th
(Spanish Basketball Federation) Kosner Baskonia	Vitoria-Gasteiz	Buesa Arena	15,431	Macron	18th
(French Federation of Basketball) LDLC ASVEL	Décines-Charpieu	LDLC Arena	12,523	Adidas	20th
(French Federation of Basketball) LDLC ASVEL	Villeurbanne	Astroballe	5,556	Adidas	20th
(Israeli Basketball Association) Maccabi Rapyd Tel Aviv	Tel Aviv			Adidas	12th
(Hellenic Basketball Federation) Olympiacos	Piraeus	Peace and Friendship Stadium	12,300	Nike	1st place, gold medalist(s)
(Hellenic Basketball Federation) Panathinaikos AKTOR	Athens	Telekom Center Athens	19,250	Adidas	7th
(French Federation of Basketball) Paris Basketball	Paris	Adidas Arena	8,000	Adidas	16th
(French Federation of Basketball) Paris Basketball	Paris	Accor Arena	15,705	Adidas	16th
(Basketball Federation of Serbia) Partizan Mozzart Bet	Belgrade	Belgrade Arena	18,386	Nike	15th
(Spanish Basketball Federation) Real Madrid	Madrid	Movistar Arena	15,000	Adidas	2nd place, silver medalist(s)
(Spain) Valencia Basket	Valencia	Roig Arena	15,600	Luanvi	3rd place, bronze medalist(s)
(Italian Basketball Federation) Virtus Bologna	Bologna	Unipol Hall	11,000	Adidas	17th
(Italian Basketball Federation) Virtus Bologna	Bologna	PalaDozza	5,570	Adidas	17th
(Lithuanian Basketball Federation) Žalgiris	Kaunas	Žalgirio Arena	15,415	Puma	5th

== Results ==
1. 1958–2001: FIBA European Champions Cup, FIBA European League, FIBA Euroleague, FIBA Suproleague
2. 2001–present: ULEB Euroleague, EuroLeague

=== FIBA era (1958–2001) ===
#	Year	Finalists			Semi-finalists	
#	Year	Champion	Score	Runner-up	Third place	Fourth place
1	1958; Details	(Soviet Union); Rīgas ASK	170–152 (86–81 / 71–84)	(Bulgaria); Academic	(Spain) Real Madrid and (Hungary) Budapesti Honvéd	
2	1958–59; Details	(Soviet Union); Rīgas ASK	148–125 (79–58 / 67–69)	(Bulgaria); Academic	(Poland) Lech Poznań (Socialist Federal Republic of Yugoslavia) OKK Beograd	
3	1959–60; Details	(Soviet Union); Rīgas ASK	130–113 (61–51 / 69–62)	(Soviet Union); Dinamo Tbilisi	(Czechoslovakia) Slovan Orbis Praha and (Poland) Polonia Warszawa	
4	1960–61; Details	(Soviet Union); CSKA Moscow	148–128 (87–62 / 66–61)	(Soviet Union); Rīgas ASK	(Romania) CCA București and (Spain) Real Madrid	
5	1961–62; Details	(Soviet Union); Dinamo Tbilisi	90–83	(Spain); Real Madrid	(Soviet Union) CSKA Moscow and (Socialist Federal Republic of Yugoslavia) AŠK Olimpija	
6	1962–63; Details	(Soviet Union); CSKA Moscow	259–240 (86–69 / 91–74 / 99–80)	(Spain); Real Madrid	(Soviet Union) Dinamo Tbilisi and (Czechoslovakia) Spartak ZJŠ Brno	
7	1963–64; Details	(Spain); Real Madrid	183–174 (110–99 / 84–64)	(Czechoslovakia); Spartak ZJŠ Brno	(Italy) Simmenthal Milano and (Socialist Federal Republic of Yugoslavia) OKK Beograd	
8	1964–65; Details	(Spain); Real Madrid	157–150 (88–81 / 76–62)	(Soviet Union); CSKA Moscow	(Socialist Federal Republic of Yugoslavia) OKK Beograd and (Italy) Ignis Varese	
9	1965–66; Details	(Italy); Simmenthal Milano	77–72	(Czechoslovakia); Slavia VŠ Praha	(Soviet Union); CSKA Moscow	(Greece); AEK
10	1966–67; Details	(Spain); Real Madrid	91–83	(Italy); Simmenthal Milano	(Czechoslovakia); Slavia VŠ Praha	(Socialist Federal Republic of Yugoslavia); AŠK Olimpija
11	1967–68; Details	(Spain); Real Madrid	98–95	(Czechoslovakia); Spartak ZJŠ Brno	(Socialist Federal Republic of Yugoslavia) Zadar and (Italy) Simmenthal Milano	
12	1968–69; Details	(Soviet Union); CSKA Moscow	103–99 (2 OT's)	(Spain); Real Madrid	(Czechoslovakia) Spartak ZJŠ Brno and (Belgium) Standard Liège	
13	1969–70; Details	(Italy); Ignis Varese	79–74	(Soviet Union); CSKA Moscow	(Spain) Real Madrid and (Czechoslovakia) Slavia VŠ Praha	
14	1970–71; Details	(Soviet Union); CSKA Moscow	67–53	(Italy); Ignis Varese	(Czechoslovakia) Slavia VŠ Praha and (Spain) Real Madrid	
15	1971–72; Details	(Italy); Ignis Varese	70–69	(Socialist Federal Republic of Yugoslavia); Jugoplastika	(Greece) Panathinaikos and (Spain) Real Madrid	
16	1972–73; Details	(Italy); Ignis Varese	71–66	(Soviet Union); CSKA Moscow	(Italy) Simmenthal Milano and (Socialist Federal Republic of Yugoslavia) Crvena zvezda	
17	1973–74; Details	(Spain); Real Madrid	84–82	(Italy); Ignis Varese	(France) Berck and (Socialist Federal Republic of Yugoslavia) Radnički Belgrade	
18	1974–75; Details	(Italy); Ignis Varese	79–66	(Spain); Real Madrid	(France) Berck and (Socialist Federal Republic of Yugoslavia) Zadar	
19	1975–76; Details	(Italy); Mobilgirgi Varese	81–74	(Spain); Real Madrid	(Italy) Birra Forst Cantù and (France) ASVEL	
20	1976–77; Details	(Israel); Maccabi Elite Tel Aviv	78–77	(Italy); Mobilgirgi Varese	(Soviet Union); CSKA Moscow	(Spain); Real Madrid
21	1977–78; Details	(Spain); Real Madrid	75–67	(Italy); Mobilgirgi Varese	(France); ASVEL	(Israel); Maccabi Elite Tel Aviv
22	1978–79; Details	(Socialist Federal Republic of Yugoslavia); Bosna	96–93	(Italy); Emerson Varese	(Israel); Maccabi Elite Tel Aviv	(Spain); Real Madrid
23	1979–80; Details	(Spain); Real Madrid	89–85	(Israel); Maccabi Elite Tel Aviv	(Socialist Federal Republic of Yugoslavia); Bosna	(Italy); Sinudyne Bologna
24	1980–81; Details	(Israel); Maccabi Elite Tel Aviv	80–79	(Italy); Sinudyne Bologna	(Netherlands); Nashua EBBC	(Socialist Federal Republic of Yugoslavia); Bosna
25	1981–82; Details	(Italy); Squibb Cantù	86–80	(Israel); Maccabi Elite Tel Aviv	(Socialist Federal Republic of Yugoslavia); Partizan	(Spain); FC Barcelona
26	1982–83; Details	(Italy); Ford Cantù	69–68	(Italy); Billy Milano	(Spain); Real Madrid	(Soviet Union); CSKA Moscow
27	1983–84; Details	(Italy); Banco di Roma	79–73	(Spain); FC Barcelona	(Italy); Jollycolombani Cantù	(Socialist Federal Republic of Yugoslavia); Bosna
28	1984–85; Details	(Socialist Federal Republic of Yugoslavia); Cibona	87–78	(Spain); Real Madrid	(Israel); Maccabi Elite Tel Aviv	(Soviet Union); CSKA Moscow
29	1985–86; Details	(Socialist Federal Republic of Yugoslavia); Cibona	94–82	(Soviet Union); Žalgiris	(Italy); Simac Milano	(Spain); Real Madrid
30	1986–87; Details	(Italy); Tracer Milano	71–69	(Israel); Maccabi Elite Tel Aviv	(France); Orthez	(Socialist Federal Republic of Yugoslavia); Zadar
31	1987–88; Details	(Italy); Tracer Milano	90–84	(Israel); Maccabi Elite Tel Aviv	(Socialist Federal Republic of Yugoslavia); Partizan	(Greece); Aris
32	1988–89; Details	(Socialist Federal Republic of Yugoslavia); Jugoplastika	75–69	(Israel); Maccabi Elite Tel Aviv	(Greece); Aris	(Spain); FC Barcelona
33	1989–90; Details	(Socialist Federal Republic of Yugoslavia); Jugoplastika	72–67	(Spain); FC Barcelona Banca Catalana	(France); Limoges CSP	(Greece); Aris
34	1990–91; Details	(Socialist Federal Republic of Yugoslavia); POP 84	70–65	(Spain); FC Barcelona Banca Catalana	(Israel); Maccabi Elite Tel Aviv	(Italy); Scavolini Pesaro
35	1991–92; Details	(Socialist Federal Republic of Yugoslavia); Partizan	71–70	(Spain); Montigalà Joventut	(Italy); Philips Milano	(Spain); Estudiantes Argentaria
36	1992–93; Details	(France); Limoges CSP	59–55	(Italy); Benetton Treviso	(Greece); PAOK	(Spain); Real Madrid Teka
37	1993–94; Details	(Spain); 7up Joventut	59–57	(Greece); Olympiacos	(Greece); Panathinaikos	(Spain); FC Barcelona Banca Catalana
38	1994–95; Details	(Spain); Real Madrid Teka	73–61	(Greece); Olympiacos	(Greece); Panathinaikos	(France); Limoges CSP
39	1995–96; Details	(Greece); Panathinaikos	67–66	(Spain); FC Barcelona Banca Catalana	(Russia); CSKA Moscow	(Spain); Real Madrid Teka
40	1996–97; Details	(Greece); Olympiacos	73–58	(Spain); FC Barcelona Banca Catalana	(Slovenia); Smelt Olimpija	(France); ASVEL
41	1997–98; Details	(Italy); Kinder Bologna	58–44	(Greece); AEK	(Italy); Benetton Treviso	(Federal Republic of Yugoslavia); Partizan Zepter
42	1998–99; Details	(Lithuania); Žalgiris	82–74	(Italy); Kinder Bologna	(Greece); Olympiacos	(Italy); Teamsystem Bologna
43	1999–00; Details	(Greece); Panathinaikos	73–67	(Israel); Maccabi Elite Tel Aviv	(Turkey); Efes Pilsen	(Spain); FC Barcelona
44	2000–01; Details	(Israel); Maccabi Elite Tel Aviv	81–67	(Greece); Panathinaikos	(Turkey); Efes Pilsen	(Russia); CSKA Moscow

=== ULEB and ECA era (2000–present) ===
#	Year	Finalists			Semi-finalists	
#	Year	Champion	Score	Runner-up	Third place	Fourth place
45	2000–01; Details	(Italy); Kinder Bologna	3–2 play-off	(Spain); Tau Cerámica	(Italy) Paf Wennington Bologna and (Greece) AEK	
46	2001–02; Details	(Greece); Panathinaikos	89–83	(Italy); Kinder Bologna	(Israel) Maccabi Elite Tel Aviv and (Italy) Benetton Treviso	
47	2002–03; Details	(Spain); FC Barcelona	76–65	(Italy); Benetton Treviso	(Italy); Montepaschi Siena	(Russia); CSKA Moscow
48	2003–04; Details	(Israel); Maccabi Elite Tel Aviv	118–74	(Italy); Skipper Bologna	(Russia); CSKA Moscow	(Italy); Montepaschi Siena
49	2004–05; Details	(Israel); Maccabi Elite Tel Aviv	90–78	(Spain); Tau Cerámica	(Greece); Panathinaikos	(Russia); CSKA Moscow
50	2005–06; Details	(Russia); CSKA Moscow	73–69	(Israel); Maccabi Elite Tel Aviv	(Spain); Tau Cerámica	(Spain); Winterthur FC Barcelona
51	2006–07; Details	(Greece); Panathinaikos	93–91	(Russia); CSKA Moscow	(Spain); Unicaja	(Spain); Tau Cerámica
52	2007–08; Details	(Russia); CSKA Moscow	91–77	(Israel); Maccabi Elite Tel Aviv	(Italy); Montepaschi Siena	(Spain); Tau Cerámica
53	2008–09; Details	(Greece); Panathinaikos	73–71	(Russia); CSKA Moscow	(Spain); Regal FC Barcelona	(Greece); Olympiacos
54	2009–10; Details	(Spain); Regal FC Barcelona	86–68	(Greece); Olympiacos	(Russia); CSKA Moscow	(Serbia); Partizan
55	2010–11; Details	(Greece); Panathinaikos	78–70	(Israel); Maccabi Electra Tel Aviv	(Italy); Montepaschi Siena	(Spain); Real Madrid
56	2011–12; Details	(Greece); Olympiacos	62–61	(Russia); CSKA Moscow	(Spain); FC Barcelona Regal	(Greece); Panathinaikos
57	2012–13; Details	(Greece); Olympiacos	100–88	(Spain); Real Madrid	(Russia); CSKA Moscow	(Spain); FC Barcelona Regal
58	2013–14; Details	(Israel); Maccabi Electra Tel Aviv	98–86 (OT)	(Spain); Real Madrid	(Spain); FC Barcelona	(Russia); CSKA Moscow
59	2014–15; Details	(Spain); Real Madrid	78–59	(Greece); Olympiacos	(Russia); CSKA Moscow	(Turkey); Fenerbahçe Ülker
60	2015–16; Details	(Russia); CSKA Moscow	101–96 (OT)	(Turkey); Fenerbahçe	(Russia); Lokomotiv Kuban	(Spain); Laboral Kutxa
61	2016–17; Details	(Turkey); Fenerbahçe	80–64	(Greece); Olympiacos	(Russia); CSKA Moscow	(Spain); Real Madrid
62	2017–18; Details	(Spain); Real Madrid	85–80	(Turkey); Fenerbahçe Doğuş	(Lithuania); Žalgiris	(Russia); CSKA Moscow
63	2018–19; Details	(Russia); CSKA Moscow	91–83	(Turkey); Anadolu Efes	(Spain); Real Madrid	(Turkey); Fenerbahçe Beko
64	2019–20; Details	Cancelled due to the COVID-19 pandemic				
65	2020–21; Details	(Turkey); Anadolu Efes	86–81	(Spain); FC Barcelona	(Italy); AX Armani Exchange Milan	(Russia); CSKA Moscow
66	2021–22; Details	(Turkey); Anadolu Efes	58–57	(Spain); Real Madrid	(Spain); FC Barcelona	(Greece); Olympiacos
67	2022–23; Details	(Spain); Real Madrid	79–78	(Greece); Olympiacos	(France); Monaco	(Spain); FC Barcelona
68	2023–24; Details	(Greece); Panathinaikos AKTOR	95–80	(Spain); Real Madrid	(Greece); Olympiacos	(Turkey); Fenerbahçe Beko
69	2024–25; Details	(Turkey); Fenerbahçe Beko	81–70	(France); Monaco	(Greece); Olympiacos	(Greece); Panathinaikos AKTOR
70	2025–26; Details	(Greece); Olympiacos	92–85	(Spain); Real Madrid	(Spain) Valencia Basket and (Turkey) Fenerbahçe Beko	

== Team statistics ==
=== Titles by club ===
Club	Title(s)	Runners-up	Champion years
(Spain) Real Madrid	11	11	1964, 1965, 1967, 1968, 1974, 1978, 1980, 1995, 2015, 2018, 2023
(Soviet Union) (Russia) CSKA Moscow	8	6	1961, 1963, 1969, 1971, 2006, 2008, 2016, 2019
(Greece) Panathinaikos	7	1	1996, 2000, 2002, 2007, 2009, 2011, 2024
(Israel) Maccabi Tel Aviv	6	9	1977, 1981, 2001, 2004, 2005, 2014
(Italy) Varese	5	5	1970, 1972, 1973, 1975, 1976
(Greece) Olympiacos	4	6	1997, 2012, 2013, 2026
(Italy) Olimpia Milano	3	2	1966, 1987, 1988
(Soviet Union) Rīgas ASK	3	1	1958, 1959, 1960
(Socialist Federal Republic of Yugoslavia) Split	3	1	1989, 1990, 1991
(Spain) FC Barcelona	2	6	2003, 2010
(Italy) Virtus Bologna	2	3	1998, 2001
(Turkey) Fenerbahçe	2	2	2017, 2025
(Turkey) Anadolu Efes	2	1	2021, 2022
(Italy) Cantù	2	0	1982, 1983
(Socialist Federal Republic of Yugoslavia) Cibona	2	0	1985, 1986
(Soviet Union) Dinamo Tbilisi	1	1	1962
(Spain) Joventut Badalona	1	1	1994
(Soviet Union) (Lithuania) Žalgiris	1	1	1999
(Socialist Federal Republic of Yugoslavia) Bosna	1	0	1979
(Italy) Virtus Roma	1	0	1984
(Socialist Federal Republic of Yugoslavia) Partizan	1	0	1992
(France) Limoges CSP	1	0	1993
(Bulgaria) Academic	0	2	—
(Czechoslovakia) Brno	0	2	—
(Italy) Treviso	0	2	—
(Spain) Baskonia	0	2	—
(Czechoslovakia) USK Praha	0	1	—
(Greece) AEK	0	1	—
(Italy) Fortitudo Bologna	0	1	—
(France) Monaco	0	1	—

=== Titles by nation ===
Country	Club	Title(s)	Runners-up
Spain	Real Madrid	11	11
Spain	FC Barcelona	2	6
Spain	Joventut Badalona	1	1
Spain	Baskonia	0	2
Spain	4 clubs	14	20
Italy
Italy	Varese	5	5
Italy	Olimpia Milano	3	2
Italy	Virtus Bologna	2	3
Italy	Cantù	2	0
Italy	Virtus Roma	1	0
Italy	Treviso	0	2
Italy	Fortitudo Bologna	0	1
Italy	7 clubs	13	13
Greece	Panathinaikos	7	1
Greece	Olympiacos	4	6
Greece	AEK	0	1
Greece	3 clubs	11	8
Soviet Union*	CSKA Moscow	4	3
Soviet Union*	Rīgas ASK	3	1
Soviet Union*	Dinamo Tbilisi	1	1
Soviet Union*	Žalgiris	0	1
Soviet Union*	4 clubs	8	6
(Socialist Federal Republic of Yugoslavia) Yugoslavia*	Split	3	1
(Socialist Federal Republic of Yugoslavia) Yugoslavia*	Cibona	2	0
(Socialist Federal Republic of Yugoslavia) Yugoslavia*	Bosna	1	0
(Socialist Federal Republic of Yugoslavia) Yugoslavia*	Partizan	1	0
(Socialist Federal Republic of Yugoslavia) Yugoslavia*	4 clubs	7	1
Israel	Maccabi Tel Aviv	6	9
Russia	CSKA Moscow	4	3
Turkey	Fenerbahçe	2	2
Turkey	Anadolu Efes	2	1
Turkey	2 clubs	4	3
France	Limoges CSP	1	0
France	Monaco	0	1
France	2 clubs	1	1
Lithuania	Žalgiris	1	0
Czechoslovakia*	Brno	0	2
Czechoslovakia*	USK Praha	0	1
Czechoslovakia*	2 clubs	0	3
Bulgaria	Academic	0	2

- Countries marked with an asterisk no longer exist.

=== Finishing positions of clubs in the EuroLeague ===
Club	Best result	S	99–00	00–01 S	00–01 E	01–02	02–03	03–04	04–05	05–06	06–07	07–08	08–09	09–10	10–11	11–12	12–13	13–14	14–15	15–16	16–17	17–18	18–19	19–20	20–21	21–22	22–23	23–24	24–25	25–26	26–27
(Spain) Barcelona								T16	T16	FF	PO	PO	3	1	PO	3	FF	3	PO	PO	11	13	PO	3	2	3	FF	PO	PO	PI	
(Spain) Baskonia								T16	2	3	FF	FF	PO	PO	PO	RS	PO	T16	T16	FF	PO	PO	PO	13	10	9	9	PO	14	18	
(Spain) Valencia Basket								T16							PO				RS			11		10	9		13	13		FF	
(Spain) Real Madrid									T16	PO		T16	PO	PO	FF	T16	2	2	1	PO	FF	1	3	2	PO	2	1	2	PO	2	
(Greece) Olympiacos								T16	RS	PO	PO	PO	FF	2	PO	1	1	PO	2	T16	2	PO	9	11	12	FF	2	3	3	1	
(Greece) Panathinaikos								T16	3	PO	1	T16	1	T16	1	FF	PO	PO	PO	PO	PO	PO	PO	6	16	13	17	1	FF	PO	
(Turkey) Fenerbahçe											RS	PO	T16	RS	T16	T16	T16	T16	FF	2	1	2	FF	8	PO	12	PO	FF	1	FF	
(Turkey) Anadolu Efes								T16	PO	PO	T16	T16	RS	T16	T16	T16	PO	T16	PO	T16	PO	16	2	1	1	1	11	PI	PO	19	
(Israel) Maccabi Tel Aviv								1	1	2	PO	2	T16	PO	2	PO	PO	1	PO	RS	14	10	10	5	13	PO	PO	PO	16	12	
(Israel) Hapoel IBI Tel Aviv																														PO	
(France) ASVEL								RS	RS					RS										15	14	14	18	17	15	20	
(France) Paris Basketball																													PO	16	
(France) AS Monaco																										PO	3	PO	2	PO	
(Italy) Olimpia Milano										RS		RS	T16	RS	RS	T16	RS	PO	T16	RS	16	15	12	12	3	PO	12	12	11	14	
(Italy) Virtus Bologna								2	T16	T16	RS	RS															14	PI	17	17	
(Germany) Bayern Munich																		T16	RS	RS			11	17	PO	PO	15	15	PI	13	
(Germany) Alba Berlin								RS					T16				T16		T16					16	15	10	16	18	18		
(Lithuania) Žalgiris								T16	T16	T16	RS	T16	RS	T16	T16	T16	T16	T16	T16	T16	10	3	PO	9	11	15	PO	14	13	PO	
(Serbia) Crvena zvezda																		RS	T16	PO	9	14		14	17	11	10	16	PI	PI	
(Serbia) Partizan								RS	RS	RS	T16	PO	PO	FF	T16	RS	RS	T16									PO	11	12	15	
(United Arab Emirates) Dubai Basketball																														11	
(Russia) Zenit Saint Petersburg																								18	PO						
(Russia) CSKA Moscow								3	FF	1	2	1	2	3	RS	2	3	FF	3	1	3	FF	1	4	FF						
(Russia) Khimki														T16	RS		T16			T16		PO	13	7	18						
(Spain) Gran Canaria																							14								
(Montenegro) Budućnost																							15								
(Turkey) Darüşşafaka																				T16	PO		16								
(Spain) Unicaja								RS	RS	T16	3	T16	T16	T16	T16	T16	T16	T16	T16	T16		9									
(Germany) Bamberg										T16		RS			RS	RS	T16	RS		T16	13	12									
(Turkey) Galatasaray																T16		PO	T16		12										
(Russia) UNICS																PO			RS		15										
(Russia) Lokomotiv Kuban																		T16		3											
(Croatia) Cedevita																	RS		RS	T16											
(France) Strasbourg										RS								RS		RS											
(France) Limoges																			RS	RS											
(Italy) Dinamo Sassari																			RS	RS											
(Turkey) Karşıyaka																				RS											
(Poland) Zielona Góra																		RS		RS											
(Russia) Nizhny Novgorod																			T16												
(Poland) Turów																			RS												
(Lithuania) Neptūnas																			RS												
(France) Nanterre																		RS													
(Ukraine) Budivelnyk																		RS													
(Italy) Siena								FF	T16	RS		3	PO	T16	3	PO	T16	RS													
(Lithuania) Rytas										T16		T16		RS	T16		RS	RS													
(Turkey) Beşiktaş																	T16														
(Poland) Gdynia									T16	RS	T16	RS	T16	PO	RS	RS	RS														
(France) Élan Chalon																	RS														
(Slovenia) Olimpija								T16	RS	RS	RS	RS	RS	RS	T16	RS	RS														
(Italy) Cantù																T16	RS														
(Spain) Bilbao																PO															
(France) SLUC Nancy													RS			RS															
(Croatia) Zagreb																RS															
(Belgium) Spirou															RS	RS															
(Italy) Roma								RS			T16	T16	T16	RS	T16																
(France) Cholet															RS																
(Croatia) Cibona								T16	T16	T16	RS	RS	T16	T16	RS																
(Greece) Maroussi														T16																	
(France) Orléans Loiret														RS																	
(Germany) Oldenburg														RS																	
(Italy) Scandone													RS																		
(France) Le Mans											RS	RS	RS																		
(Spain) Joventut Badalona											T16		RS																		
(Greece) Panionios													RS																		
(Greece) Aris											T16	T16																			
(France) Chorale Roanne												RS																			
(Russia) Dynamo Moscow											PO																				
(France) Pau-Orthez								T16	RS	RS	T16																				
(Italy) Benetton Treviso								T16	PO	T16	T16																				
(Italy) Napoli											RS																				
(Germany) RheinStars Köln											RS																				
(Turkey) Ülker								T16	PO	T16																					
(Greece) AEK								RS	T16	RS																					
(Italy) Scavolini Pesaro									PO																						
(Spain) Estudiantes									RS																						
(Germany) Skyliners Frankfurt									RS																						
(Slovenia) Krka								RS																							
(Poland) Śląsk Wrocław								RS																							
[[ ]]																															

== Records ==
=== FIBA era ===
- Real Madrid has been the most successful team, having won the competition a record eleven times (three since 2000–01).
- Split (1988–89, 1989–90, 1990–91), is the only team to have won the competition three times in a row in the modern EuroLeague Final Four era (1987–88 season to present).
- Rīgas ASK, as a Soviet League club in the late 1950s and early 1960s (1958, 1958–59, 1959–60), is the only team to have won the competition three times in a row in the pre-EuroLeague Final Four era.
- Real Madrid (1963–64, 1964–65) & (1966–67, 1967–68), along with Varese (1971–72, 1972–73) & (1974–75, 1975–76), are the only teams to have won the European Championship twice in a row on two occasions in the pre-modern EuroLeague Final Four era.
- Cantù (1981–82, 1982–83), Cibona (1984–85, 1985–86), and Olimpia Milano (1986–87, 1987–88), are the other three teams to have won the European Championship twice in a row (only for one time) in the pre-modern EuroLeague Final Four era.
- The most points ever scored in a single game by an individual in the league's overall history (since 1958), is 99 points, by Radivoj Korać of OKK Beograd, on 14 January 1965, during the 1964–65 season, in a game against Alvik.
- The most points ever scored in a single EuroLeague Finals game by an individual is 47 points, in the 1978–79 season, by Žarko Varajić of Bosna, in a game against Emerson Varese on 5 April 1979.
- In a small area of less than 40 km^{2} (15 sq mi) (25 mi^{2}), north of Milan, there are 3 clubs that have won a total of 10 FIBA European Champions' Cups, and played in a total of 16 finals: Pallacanestro Varese (5), Olimpia Milano (3) and Cantù (2)

=== Modern era (2000–present) ===
- Maccabi Tel Aviv (2003–04, 2004–05), Olympiacos (2011–12, 2012–13), and Anadolu Efes (2020–21, 2021–22) are the only teams to have won the EuroLeague twice in a row, becoming back-to-back EuroLeague champions in the Euroleague Basketball era (2000–01 season to present).
- Fenerbahçe are the only team which stayed undefeated at home after a 30-game regular season and secured the best record after a regular season (25–5) under the new format (2016–17 season to present). They are also the earliest EuroLeague Playoffs qualifiers ever in the modern EuroLeague era.
- Istanbul is the only city from which nine clubs have played in the competition: Beşiktaş, Darüşşafaka, Eczacıbaşı, Efes, Fenerbahçe, Galatasaray, Istanbul Technical University, Modaspor, and Ülker have participated in the EuroLeague.
- Although Israel is located in the Middle East, its teams play in the EuroLeague, as its national federation is a member of FIBA Europe and its top professional league is a member of ULEB. Similarly, the Israel Football Association is a member of UEFA, enabling its national team and clubs to play in UEFA competitions.
- The record score differential for a EuroLeague Finals game was achieved at the 2004 Finals, in Tel Aviv, where the home club, Maccabi Tel Aviv, defeated Skipper Bologna, by a score of 118–74 (a 44-point difference).
- A crowd of 22,567, which filled Belgrade Arena on 5 March 2009, for a 2008–09 season Top 16 game between Partizan and Panathinaikos is the league's official all seated attendance record. Before that, a crowd of 18,500 all seated fans occurred at a Panathinaikos home game at the Olympic Indoor Hall, in Athens, against Tau Cerámica, on 12 April 2006, during the 2005–06 third quarterfinal playoff game.
- The most points ever scored in a single game by an individual in the league since Euroleague Basketball has owned the competition (2000), is 50 points, by Nigel Hayes of Fenerbahçe, on 29 March 2024, during the 2023–24 season, in a game against Alba Berlin.

=== All-time leaders ===
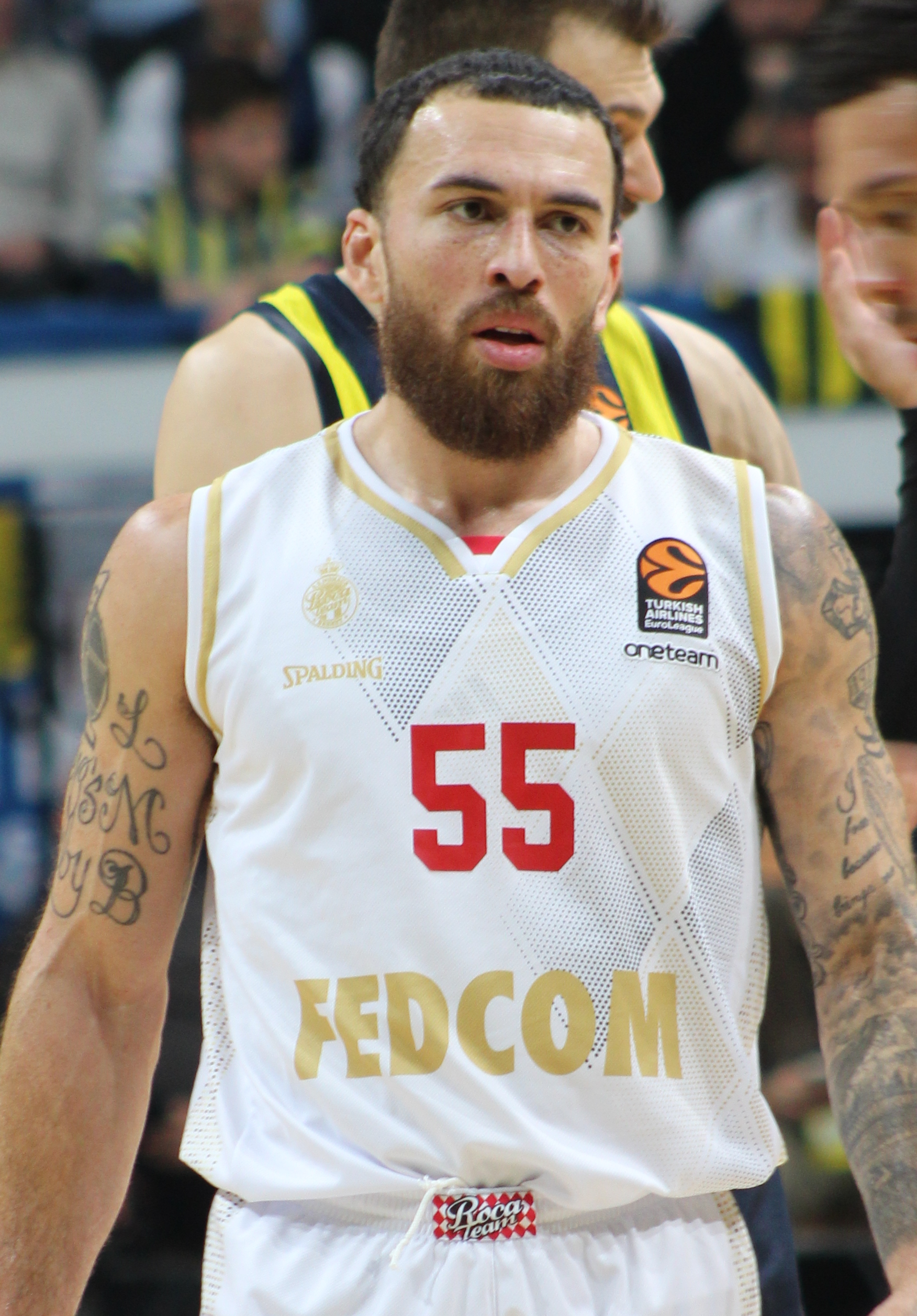
Mike James is the competition's all-time scorer since 2000–01.

Since the beginning of the 2000–01 season (Euroleague Basketball era):

	Average		Accumulated	
Games Played	-		(Spain) Sergio Llull	487
Games Started	-		(Greece) Kostas Papanikolaou	360
Minutes Played	(United States) Anthony Parker	35:00	(Greece) Kostas Sloukas	10614:02
Points	(United States) Alphonso Ford	22.22	(United States) Mike James	5961
Rebounds	(United States) Joseph Blair	10.05	(Cape Verde) Edy Tavares	2178
Assists	(Bulgaria) Codi Miller-McIntyre	6.5	(Greece) Nick Calathes	2266
Steals	(Argentina) Manu Ginóbili	2.73	(Greece) Nick Calathes	487
Blocks	(Ukraine) Grigorij Khizhnyak	3.19	(Cape Verde) Edy Tavares	552
Index Rating	(United States) Anthony Parker	21.41	(United States) Mike James	6222
Assist-Turnover ratio	(United States) Jerian Grant	3.2	-	
Free Τhrows	(Greece) Panagiotis Liadelis	6.74	(United States) Mike James	1358
Free Τhrows %	(France) Nando de Colo	93.5%	-	
Free Τhrows Attempted	(Greece) Panagiotis Liadelis	7.71	(United States) Mike James	1680
2-Pointers	(Latvia) Kaspars Kambala	6.55	(Czech Republic) Jan Veselý	1701
2-Pointers %	(United States) (Azerbaijan) Donta Hall	74.7%	-	
2-Pointers Attempted	(United States) Alphonso Ford	12.02	(Czech Republic) Jan Veselý	2767
3-Pointers	(United States) Markus Howard	2.9	(Spain) Sergio Llull	712
3-Pointers %	(Croatia) Fran Pilepić	50.45%	-	
3-Pointers Attempted	(United States) Markus Howard	7.8	(Spain) Sergio Llull	2173
Field Goals	(United States) Alphonso Ford	8.11	(United States) Mike James	1968
Field Goals %	(Cape Verde) Edy Tavares	72.98%	-	
Field Goals Attempted	(United States) Alphonso Ford	16.09	(United States) Mike James	4691
True Shooting %	(United States) (Azerbaijan) Donta Hall	75.2%	-	
Double doubles	-		(Turkey) Mirsad Türkcan	50
Triple doubles	-		(Croatia) Nikola Vujčić	2
Fouls Drawn	(Serbia) Dragan Lukovski	6.04	(United States) Mike James	1598
Fouls Committed	(United States) (Italy) Shaun Stonerook	3.73	(Czech Republic) Jan Veselý	1170
Blocks Against	(Latvia) Kaspars Kambala	0.81	(Greece) Vassilis Spanoulis	231
Turnovers	(United States) Will Solomon	3.13	(Greece) Vassilis Spanoulis	1087

== Attendances ==
=== Season averages ===
All averages include playoffs and Final Four games.

Season	Total gate	Games	Average	Change	High avg.	Team	Low avg.	Team
2008–09	1,263,578	188	6,721		11,770	(Greece) Panathinaikos	2,460	(Greece) Panionios On Telecoms
2009–10	1,182,046	186	6,355	–5.4%	11,188	(Israel) Maccabi Tel Aviv	1,440	(Turkey) Fenerbahçe Ülker
2010–11	1,383,449	185	7,478	+17.7%	13,926	(Turkey) Fenerbahçe Ülker	3,180	(Russia) Khimki
2011–12	1,305,215	178	7,333	–1.9%	13,107	(Lithuania) Žalgiris	3,283	(Poland) Asseco Prokom
2012–13	1,867,145	253	7,366	+0.5%	13,425	(Lithuania) Žalgiris	3,110	(Poland) Asseco Prokom
2013–14	2,063,600	248	8,130	+10.4%	12,578	(Serbia) Partizan NIS	3,960	(Ukraine) Budivelnyk
2014–15	2,013,305	251	8,184	+0.1%	14,483	(Serbia) Crvena Zvezda Telekom	1,949	(Poland) PGE Turów
2015–16	1,832,920	250	7,332	–10.4%	11,060	(Israel) Maccabi Playtika Tel Aviv	2,809	(Russia) Khimki
2016–17	2,194,238	259	8,472	+5.4%	11,633	(Spain) Baskonia	3,734	(Russia) UNICS
2017–18	2,282,297	260	8,780	+3.6%	13,560	(Lithuania) Žalgiris	3,900	(Turkey) Anadolu Efes
2018–19	2,153,445	260	8,282	–6.0%	14,808	(Lithuania) Žalgiris	2,691	(Turkey) Darüşşafaka Tekfen
2019–20	2,138,504	222 (Note: Season was curtailed due to the COVID-19 pandemic. Four games, for different reasons, were played under closed doors and are not included in this table.)	8,588	+3.7%	14,221	(Lithuania) Žalgiris	4,299	(Russia) Zenit

=== Historic average attendances ===
This list shows the averages attendances of each team since the double round robin regular season was established in 2016. All averages include playoffs games.

Team / Season	2016-17	2017-18	2018-19	2019-20	2020-21	2021-22	2022-23	2023-24	2024-25	2025-26
Alba Berlin	–	–	–	9,930	–	3,825	8,820	9,406	9,180	–
Anadolu Efes	5,320	3,900	8,247	13,113	–	11,876	13,126	12,471	9,564	6,668
ASVEL Basket	–	–	–	5,326	–	4,237	5,301	7,565	7,368	7,537
Bamberg Baskets	6,415	6,188	–	–	–	–	–	–	–	–
Barcelona	4,931	5,679	5,793	5,977	–	5,174	6,353	6,444	6,242	5,514
Baskonia	11,633	11,351	11,138	10,661	–	6,885	8,898	9,970	9,482	8,737
Bayern Munich	–	–	4,349	4,688	–	2,673	5,549	6,218	10,898	10,862
Budućnost	–	–	4,792	–	–	–	–	–	–	–
Crvena Zvezda	9,818	6,277	–	11,744	–	6,042	7,085	17,842	18,239	17,901
CSKA Moscow	8,293	8,211	7,198	7,050	–	–	–	–	–	–
Darüşşafaka	4,677	–	2,691	–	–	–	–	–	–	–
Dubai Basketball	–	–	–	–	–	–	–	–	–	5,858
Fenerbahçe	11,219	11,566	10,737	9,862	–	5,545	10,465	10,065	10,931	10,113
Galatasaray	4,806	–	–	–	–	–	–	–	–	–
Gran Canaria	–	–	4,823	–	–	–	–	–	–	–
Hapoel Tel Aviv	–	–	–	–	–	–	–	–	–	4,981
BC Khimki	–	6,022	5,502	5,189	–	–	–	–	–	–
Maccabi Tel Aviv	10,888	10,731	10,522	10,038	–	8,429	10,400	648	178	3,330
Málaga	–	7,272	–	–	–	–	–	–	–	–
Monaco	–	–	–	–	–	3,536	4,392	4,052	4,071	4,464
Olimpia Milano	9,483	7,472	8,493	8,491	–	4,893	9,270	10,051	9,158	5,986
Olympiacos	9,360	8,913	8,203	7,287	–	7,037	10,449	11,535	11,631	12,255
Panathinaikos	11,172	13,005	12,530	9,858	–	3,883	6,173	15,299	17,464	18,570
Paris Basketball	–	–	–	–	–	–	–	–	7,621	7,046
Partizan	–	–	–	–	–	–	17,938	19,916	18,551	15,280
Real Madrid	10,312	10,030	9,792	9,649	–	5,943	8,128	8,914	9,236	8,986
BC UNICS	3,734	–	–	–	–	–	–	–	–	–
Valencia Basket	–	6,753	–	7,433	–	–	6,064	6,369		12,660
Virtus Bologna	–	–	–	–	–	–	6,169	8,033	7,799	–
Žalgiris	11,418	13,560	14,808	14,221	–	7,630	14,839	14,773	14,872	14,880
Zenit	–	–	–	4,299	–	–	–	–	–	–

=== Individual game highest attendance ===
Rank	Home team	Score	Away team	Attendance	Arena	Date	Ref
1	(Serbia) Partizan	63–56	(Greece) Panathinaikos	22,567	Belgrade Arena	5 March 2009	
2	(Serbia) Partizan	79–76	(Serbia) Crvena zvezda Meridianbet	21,854	Belgrade Arena	12 December 2025	
3	(Serbia) Partizan	64–80	(Spain) Real Madrid	21,374	Belgrade Arena	2 January 2014	
4	(Serbia) Partizan	76–67	(Israel) Maccabi Tel Aviv	21,367	Belgrade Arena	1 April 2010	
5	(Serbia) Partizan	56–67	(Russia) CSKA Moscow	21,352	Belgrade Arena	31 March 2009	
6	(Serbia) Crvena zvezda Meridianbet	80–86	(Lithuanian Basketball Federation) Žalgiris	20,999	Belgrade Arena	27 February 2025	
7	(Serbia) Crvena zvezda Meridianbet	72–78	(Spain) Real Madrid	20,997	Belgrade Arena	28 March 2025	
8	(Serbia) Crvena zvezda Meridianbet	94–98	(Spanish Basketball Federation) Barcelona	20,991	Belgrade Arena	18 October 2024	
9	(Serbia) Crvena zvezda Meridianbet	85–69	(French Federation of Basketball) Paris Basketball	20,990	Belgrade Arena	10 January 2025	
10	(Serbia) Crvena zvezda Meridianbet	91–96	(Turkish Basketball Federation) Fenerbahçe Beko	20,989	Belgrade Arena	15 January 2025	

== Media coverage ==
The EuroLeague season is broadcast on television, and can be seen in up to 201 countries and territories. It can be seen by up to 245 million (800 million via satellite) households weekly in China.

EuroLeague basketball has been televised in the United States through the ESPN family of networks since 2023, starting with the playoffs of the 2022–2023 season. It was also televised in the United States and Canada on NBA TV and available online through ESPN3 (in English) and ESPN Deportes (in Spanish) until the 2017–2018 season. Starting with the 2017-2018 Final Four playoffs, and continuing into the 2018-2019 and 2019–2020 seasons, the coverage moved to FloSports, before returning later to the ESPN networks.

The EuroLeague Final Four is broadcast on television in up to 213 countries and territories. The EuroLeague also has its own internet pay TV service, called EuroLeague TV.

=== Broadcasters ===
This is a partial list of television broadcasters that provide coverage of the EuroLeague.

Country/Region	Broadcaster	Language	Free/Pay TV
International	EuroLeague TV (online internet broadcast)	English	Pay/Free
Africa	Sporty TV	English	Free
Africa	New World TV	French	Pay
Albania	RTSH	Albanian	Free
Armenia	Fast Sports	Armenian	Pay
Azerbaijan	İdman TV	Azeri	Free
Balkans South: Bosnia and Herzegovina; Montenegro; North Macedonia; Serbia	Arena Sport	Bosnian; Montenegrin; Macedonian; Serbian	Pay
Baltic states: Estonia; Latvia; Lithuania	Go3 Sport	Estonian; Latvian; Lithuanian	Pay
Belgium	Sport 10	Dutch	Free
Belgium	BeTV	French	Pay
Brazil	XSports	Portuguese	Free
Bulgaria	Max Sport	Bulgarian	Pay
China	CMG	Chinese	Free
CIS: Azerbaijan; Georgia; Kazakhstan; Kyrgyzstan; Moldova; Tajikistan; Turkmenistan; Ukraine; Uzbekistan	Setanta Sports	Russian/Ukrainian	Pay
Croatia	Sport Klub	Croatian	Pay
Slovenia	Sport Klub	Slovenian	Pay
Slovenia	Šport TV	Slovenian	Pay
Cyprus	Nova Sports	Greek	Pay
Greece	Nova Sports	Greek	Pay
Czech Republic	Oneplay	Czech	Pay
France	beIN Sports	French	Pay
Monaco	beIN Sports	French	Pay
Georgia	Silknet	Georgian	Pay
Germany	Magenta Sport	German	Pay
Italy	Sky Sport	Italian	Pay
Israel	Sport 5	Hebrew	Pay
Kosovo	Kujtesa	Albanian	Pay
Latin America: Argentina; Bolivia; Brazil; Chile; Colombia; Costa Rica; Dominican Republic; Ecuador; El Salvador; Guatemala; Honduras; Mexico; Nicaragua; Panama; Paraguay; Peru; Uruguay; Venezuela	Basquet Pass	Spanish (exc. Brazil) and Portuguese (Brazil only)	Pay
MENA	Dubai Sports	English and Arabic	Free
Mexico	TV Azteca	Spanish	Free
Poland	Polsat Sport	Polish	Pay
Portugal	Sport TV	Portuguese	Pay
Romania	Voyo	Romanian	Pay
Russia	Okko	Russian	Pay
Spain	Movistar Plus+	Spanish	Pay
Taiwan	Sportcast	Taiwanese	Pay
Turkey	S Sport	Turkish	Pay

== Sponsors ==
Premium partners

- BKT
- Motorola Mobility
- Experience Abu Dhabi
- Adidas

Official Partners

- VISA
- Spalding
- AX Armani Exchange
- DenizBank
- Castrol
- Enerjisa Commodities
- Vatanmed
- McDavid
- Uludağ Gazoz

Licensing Partners

- Amazon
- Panini

== See also ==
- EuroLeague versus NBA games
- European professional club basketball system
- All-EuroLeague Team
- EuroLeague Final Four
- EuroLeague SuperCup

=== Men's competitions ===
- EuroCup Basketball
- FIBA Champions League
- FIBA Europe Cup
- EuroLeague SuperCup

=== Women's competitions ===
- EuroLeague Women
- EuroCup Women
- FIBA Europe SuperCup Women

=== IWBF Basketball ===
- IWBF Champions League
- EuroCup 1
- EuroCup 2
- EuroCup 3
