= BSR Valladolid =

Fundación Grupo Norte
- Leagues: División de Honor
- Founded: 1994
- History: CD Aspaym CyL (1994–2001); BSR Valladolid (2001–present)
- Arena: Pabellón Pilar Fernández Valderrama
- Capacity: 1,545
- Location: Valladolid, Castile and León, Spain
- Team colors: Purple and white
- Championships: 1 Willi Brinkmann Cup; 1 Spanish League
- Website: bsrvalladolid.com
Home	Away

BSR Valladolid, more commonly known by its sponsorship naming Fundación Aliados, is a wheelchair basketball team based in Valladolid, Castile and Léon, Spain.

== History ==
BSR Valladolid was founded in 1994 as Club Deportivo Aspaym Castilla y León. In 1998 the team made its debut in the División de Honor, the Spanish top league, where it competes until now. Since 2002, the club is sponsored by Fundación Grupo Norte.

In 2010 Valladolid won the Willi Brinkmann Cup, the third tier in European wheelchair basketball, and in 2011 it won the Spanish League for the first time in its history.

== Season by season ==
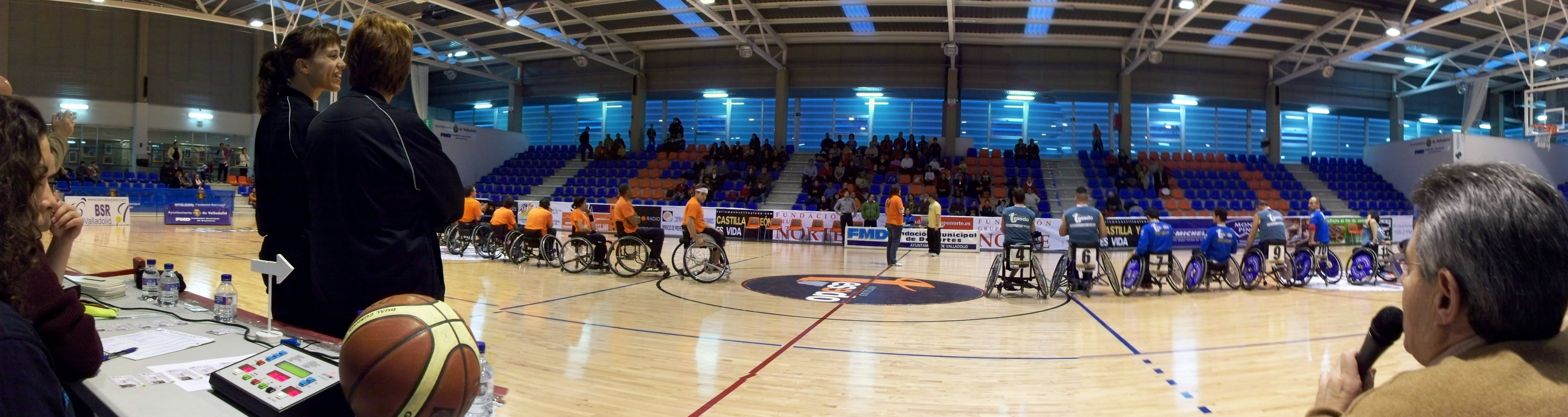
A game of BSR Valladolid

Season	League	Pos	Copa del Rey	European competitions	
1995–96	2ª División	3rd	—	—	
1996–97	2ª División	1st	—	—	
1997–98	1ª División	1st	—	—	
1998–99	Div. Honor	3rd	4th position	—	
1999–00	Div. Honor	4th	Runner-up	2 André Vergauwen Cup	4th
2000–01	Div. Honor	7th	Quarterfinalist	2 André Vergauwen Cup	4th
2001–02	Div. Honor	8th	—	—	
2002–03	Div. Honor	8th	—	—	
2003–04	Div. Honor	8th	—	—	
2004–05	Div. Honor	6th	Quarterfinalist	—	
2005–06	Div. Honor	7th	4th position	3 Willi Brinkmann Cup	4th
2006–07	Div. Honor	8th	Quarterfinalist	—	
2007–08	Div. Honor	10th	—	3 Willi Brinkmann Cup	4th
2008–09	Div. Honor	7th	4th position	3 Willi Brinkmann Cup	4th
2009–10	Div. Honor	4th	3rd position	3 Willi Brinkmann Cup	C
2010–11	Div. Honor	1st	Runner-up	1 Champions Cup	4th
2011–12	Div. Honor	4th	3rd position	2 André Vergauwen Cup	8th
2012–13	Div. Honor	2nd	4th position	1 Champions Cup	8th
2013–14	Div. Honor	7th	Quarterfinalist	—	
2014–15	Div. Honor	4th	3rd position	3 Willi Brinkmann Cup	RU
2015–16	Div. Honor	4th	Quarterfinalist	2 André Vergauwen Cup	4th
2016–17	Div. Honor	5th	4th position	3 Willi Brinkmann Cup	RU
2017–18	Div. Honor	6th	Quarterfinalist	—	

== Notable players ==
- (Spain) Antonio Henares
- (Spain) Diego de Paz
- (Spain) Alejandro Zarzuela
- (Australia) Tristan Knowles
- (United Kingdom) Dan Highcock
- (Mexico) Salvador Zavala
