= CD ONCE Andalucía =

ONCE Andalucía
- Leagues: División de Honor
- Founded: 1988
- Dissolved: 2011
- Arena: Pabellón Luis Braille
- Location: Seville, Spain
- Team colors: Yellow and green
- Championships: 1 André Vergauwen Cup; 9 Spanish Leagues; 7 Spanish Cups
Home	Away

Club Deportivo ONCE Andalucía was a wheelchair basketball team based in Seville, Spain.

== History ==
ONCE Andalucía was founded in 1988 as part of the Spanish association ONCE. Since 1991, it competed in the top Spanish Wheelchair Basketball League, except in the 1994–95 season, when its berth was sold to the new creation club CD Fundosa ONCE.

After winning several Spanish competitions, in 2008 it won the André Vergauwen Cup, its only European achievement.

In 2011 the club was dissolved due to its financial trouble.

== Season by season ==
Season	League	Pos	Copa del Rey	European competitions	
1988–89	3rdª División	1st	—	—	
1989–90	2ª División	1st	4th position	—	
1990–91	1ª División	1st	—	—	
1991–92	Div. Honor	1st	Champion	—	
1992–93	Div. Honor	1st	Runner-up	2 André Vergauwen Cup	QR
1993–94	Div. Honor	1st	Champion	2 André Vergauwen Cup	QR
1994–95	1ª División	1st	4th position	—	
1995–96	Div. Honor	3rd	3rd position	—	
1996–97	Div. Honor	4th	3rd position	—	
1997–98	Div. Honor	7th	—	—	
1998–99	Div. Honor	9th	Champion	—	
1999–00	Div. Honor	8th	—	—	
2000–01	Div. Honor	2nd	3rd position	—	
2001–02	Div. Honor	2nd	Champion	1 Champions Cup	7th
2002–03	Div. Honor	1st	Runner-up	1 Champions Cup	QR
2003–04	Div. Honor	1st	Champion	—	
2004–05	Div. Honor	1st	Champion	—	
2005–06	Div. Honor	1st	Champion	1 Champions Cup	QR
2006–07	Div. Honor	3rd	Quarterfinalist	1 Champions Cup	QR
2007–08	Div. Honor	1st	Runner-up	2 André Vergauwen Cup	C
2008–09	Div. Honor	2nd	3rd position	1 Champions Cup	6th
2009–10	Div. Honor	1st	Champion	1 Champions Cup	8th
2010–11	Div. Honor	5th	Quarterfinalist	—	

== Notable players ==
- (Spain) Diego de Paz
