= Palau Blaugrana =

Sporting arena in Barcelona

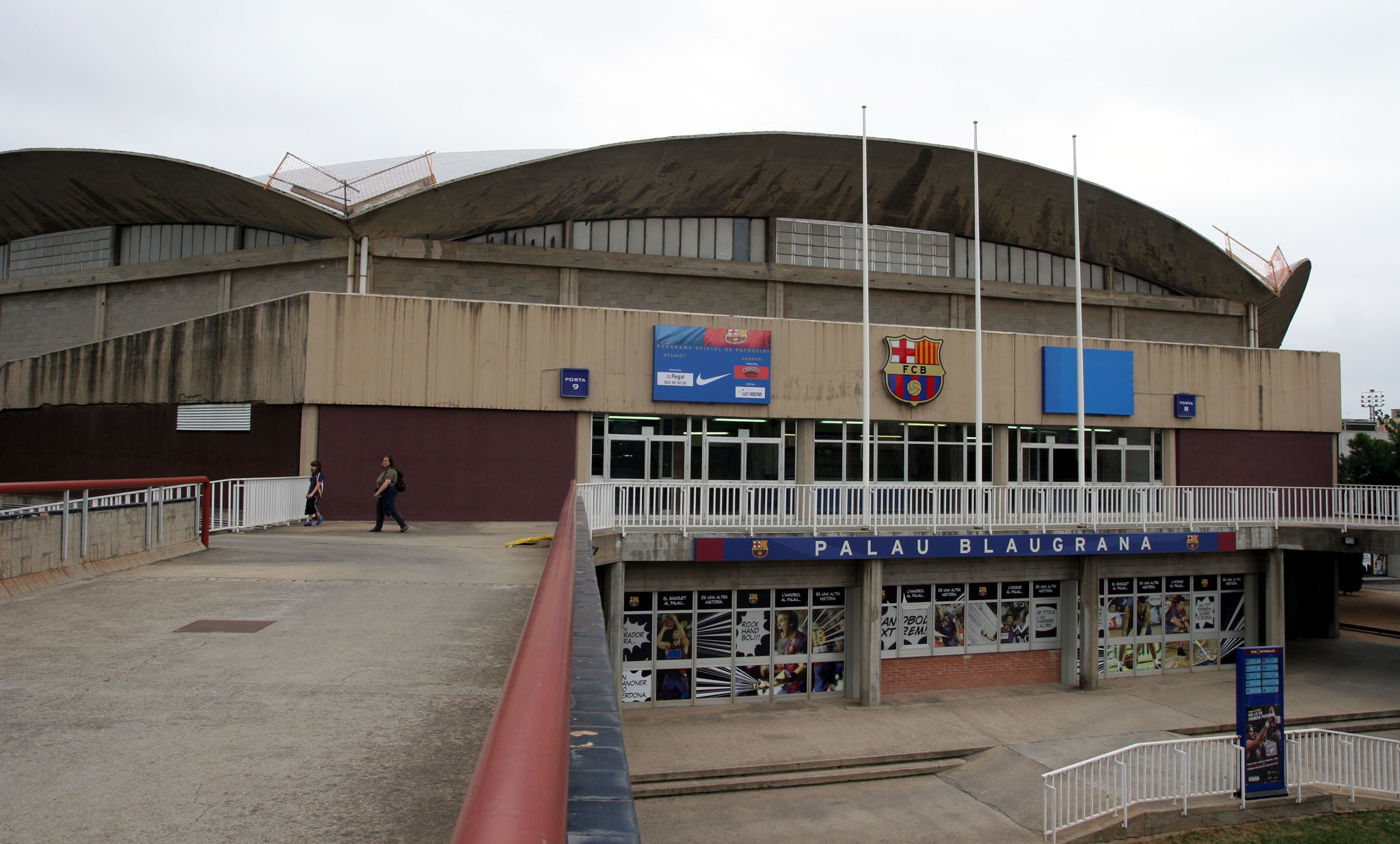
- Interactive map of Palau Blaugrana
- Location: Barcelona, Spain
- Coordinates: 41°22′48″N 2°07′12″E
- Owner: Futbol Club Barcelona
- Capacity: 7,585

Construction
- Opened: 23 October 1971
- Renovated: 1994, 2016
- Expanded: 1994
- Architect: Francesc Cavaller

Tenants
- FC Barcelona Bàsquet (ACB); FC Barcelona Handbol (ASOBAL); FC Barcelona Hoquei (OK Liga); FC Barcelona Futsal (Primera División)

Palau Blaugrana (Catalan pronunciation: [pəˈlaw ˌβlawˈɣɾanə], meaning in English "Blue and Garnet Palace") is an arena in Barcelona, Catalonia, Spain, belonging to FC Barcelona. The 7,585 seating capacity arena is home to the basketball, handball, roller hockey, and futsal divisions of FC Barcelona. Palau Blaugrana is located in the same complex that houses the Camp Nou stadium.

== History ==
Built in 1971, the stadium originally held 5,696 spectators, but the facility was remodeled in 1994, to fit the current capacity of 7,585. During the 1992 Summer Olympics, the arena hosted several events, including roller hockey, taekwondo and judo. The arena's main court area was renovated in 2016.

=== Retired numbers ===
Several basketball, handball, roller hockey and futsal players have had their jerseys retired:

- 4 Andrés Jiménez, 7 Nacho Solozábal, 11 Juan Carlos Navarro, 12 Roberto Dueñas and 15 Epi for Basketball
- 2 Òscar Grau, 4 Xavier O'Callaghan, 5 Enric Masip, 7 Iñaki Urdangarin, 8 Víctor Tomás, 14 Joan Sagalés and 16 David Barrufet for Handball
- 1 Aitor Egurrola, 21 Alberto Borregán for Roller Hockey
- 28 Paco Sedano for Futsal

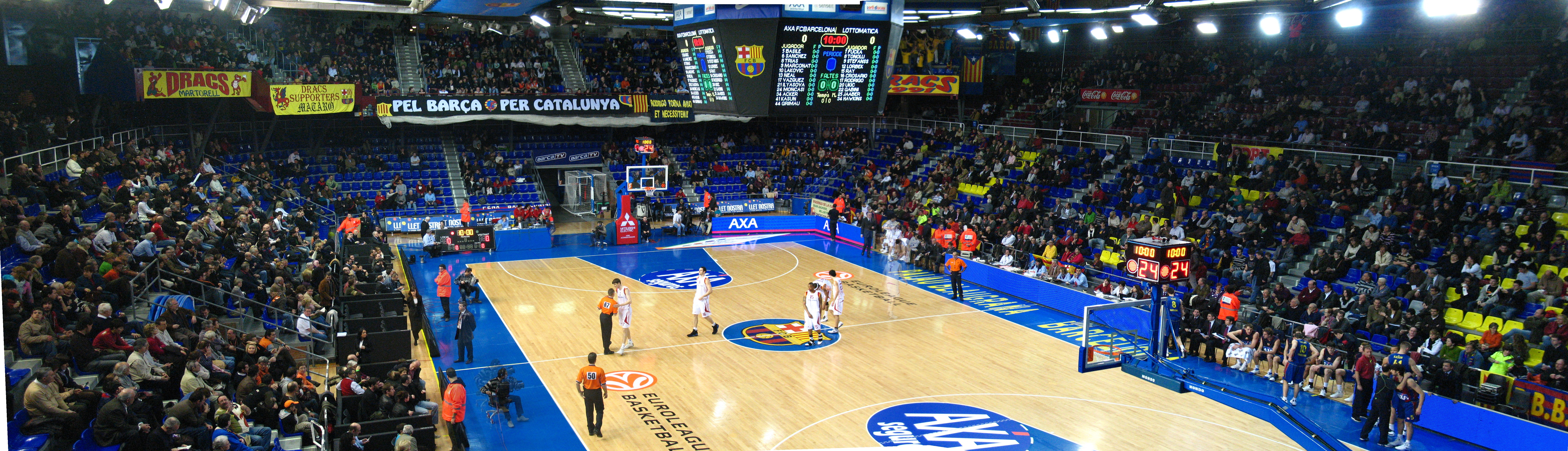
Panoramic view during a EuroLeague basketball game in February 2008.

== Nou Palau Blaugrana ==
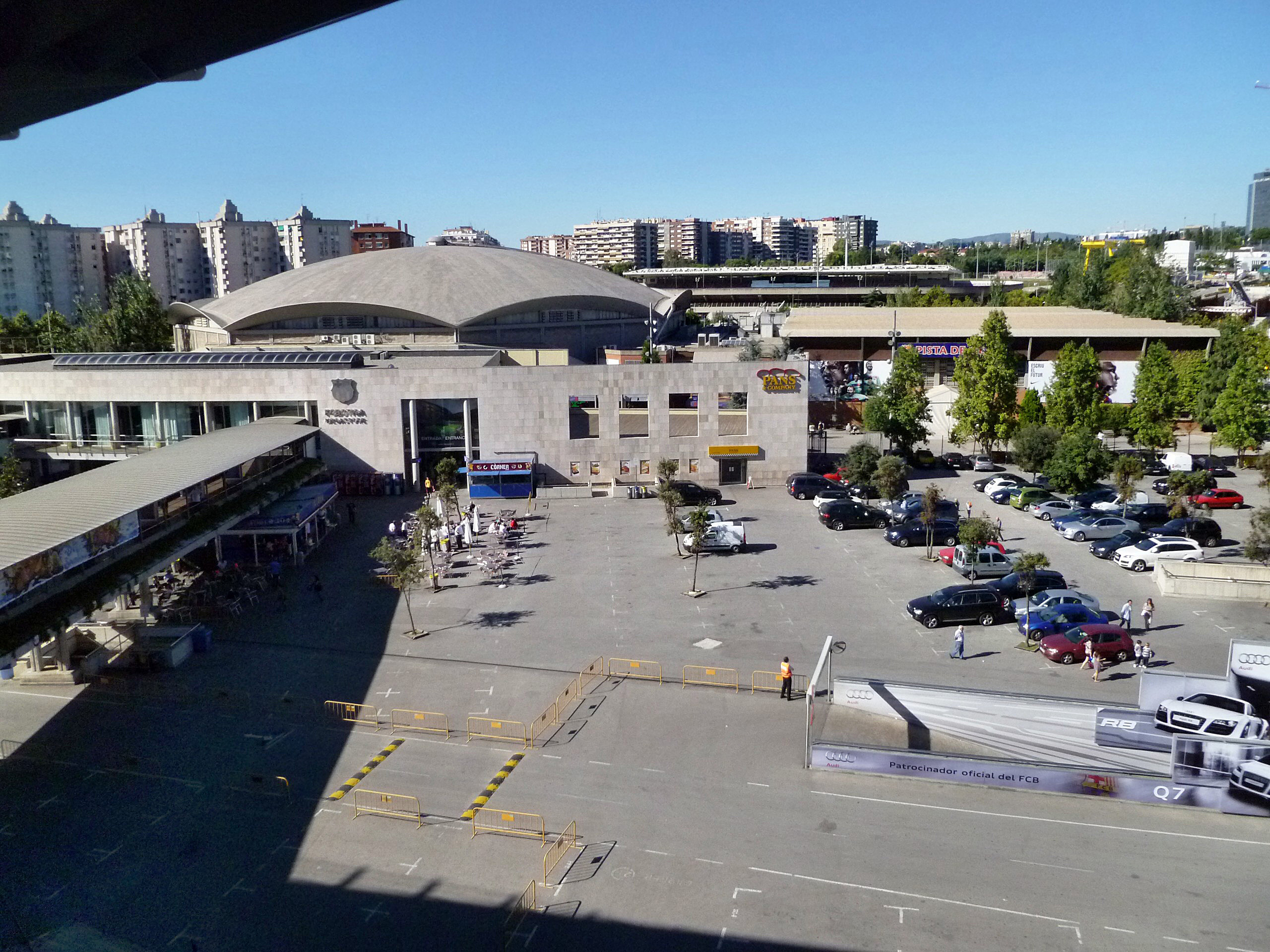

Under Sandro Rosell's presidency, FC Barcelona announced that by 2013, it planned to build a new Palau Blaugrana for its handball and basketball teams, with a capacity of 12,000 seats. Also included in the plan, was a smaller campus with a capacity of 3,000 seats, plus [a special conditions] for hotel partners (operated by a specialist company located on the corner of Aristides Maillol with John XXIII), new parking spaces and an auditorium, with a 2,000 capacity, for the foundation, including the offices of the club. These plans, however, were later dropped in favour of the Espai Barça project.

Under the Espai Barça project, the current Palau Blaugrana will be demolished, and a new arena is expected to be built on the site previously occupied by the Mini Estadi, which was demolished to make way for the new arena. Work is expected to start by the 2017–18 basketball season. The Nou Palau Blaugrana will have a capacity of about 12,500 people with an adjacent, smaller court that will seat approximately 2,000. Additionally, the New Palau will have 24 VIP boxes and 4 sky bars with court views.

== See also ==
- FC Barcelona (Main body and football club)
- FC Barcelona Bàsquet (basketball)
- FC Barcelona Handbol (handball)
- FC Barcelona Hoquei (roller hockey)
- FC Barcelona Futsal (futsal)
- FC Barcelona-Institut Guttman (wheelchair basketball)
- UB-Barça (Women's basketball)

Preceded by Stade Pierre de Coubertin; Paris	Masters Cup; Venue; 1972	Succeeded by Boston Garden; Boston
Preceded by Ginásio do Ibirapuera; São Paulo	FIBA Intercontinental Cup; Final Venue; 1985	Succeeded by Estadio Obras Sanitarias; Buenos Aires
