= CD Ilunion =

Wheelchair basketball team based in Madrid, Spain

- Leagues: División de Honor
- Founded: 1994
- History: CD Fundosa ONCE (1994–2014); CD Ilunion (2014–present)
- Location: Madrid, Spain
- Team colors: Yellow and blue
- Championships: 3 IWBF Champions Cup; 16 Spanish Leagues; 18 Spanish Cups
- Website: cdfundosaonce.com
Home	Away

Club Deportivo Ilunion, formerly known as Club Deportivo Fundosa ONCE, is a wheelchair basketball team based in Madrid, Spain.

== History ==
Fundosa ONCE was founded in 1994 as the sports club of the ONCE. Since its first season, the club played in División de Honor thanks to achieving the league berth of CD ONCE Andalucía.

Fundosa ONCE is the most prolific team in the Spanish wheelchair basketball. In 1997, the club won the IWBF Champions Cup, its biggest achievement until repeating the feat in 2015 and 2016 respectively.

In 2014, Fundosa ONCE changed its name to CD Ilunion. Two years later, Ilunion won its second IWBF Champions Cup after beating in the final RSV Lahn-Dill by 71–45.

== Season by season ==
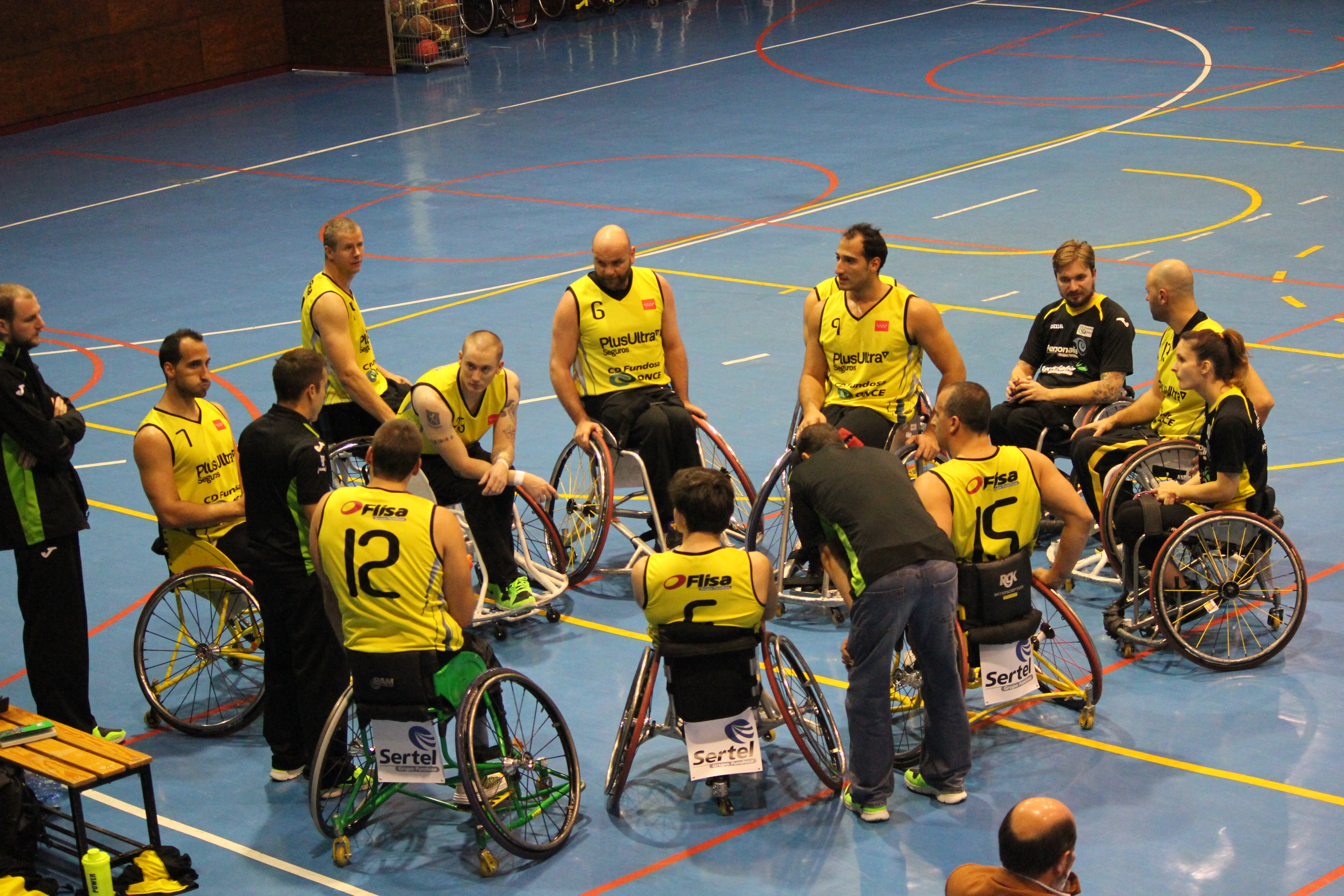
Fundosa ONCE, in a timeout during a game in 2013

Season	League	Pos	Copa del Rey	European competitions	
1994–95	Div. Honor	1st	Champion	1 Champions Cup	3rd
1995–96	Div. Honor	1st	Champion	1 Champions Cup	RU
1996–97	Div. Honor	1st	Champion	1 Champions Cup	C
1997–98	Div. Honor	1st	Champion	1 Champions Cup	RU
1998–99	Div. Honor	1st	Champion	1 Champions Cup	3rd
1999–00	Div. Honor	1st	Champion	1 Champions Cup	QR
2000–01	Div. Honor	1st	Champion	1 Champions Cup	4th
2001–02	Div. Honor	1st	Runner-up	1 Champions Cup	4th
2002–03	Div. Honor	2nd	3rd position	1 Champions Cup	RU
2003–04	Div. Honor	3rd	Runner-up	1 Champions Cup	3rd
2004–05	Div. Honor	3rd	Runner-up	1 Champions Cup	6th
2005–06	Div. Honor	3rd	3rd position	1 Champions Cup	4th
2006–07	Div. Honor	1st	Champion	1 Champions Cup	5th
2007–08	Div. Honor	2nd	Champion	1 Champions Cup	5th
2008–09	Div. Honor	1st	Champion	1 Champions Cup	5th
2009–10	Div. Honor	2nd	Quarterfinalist	1 Champions Cup	7th
2010–11	Div. Honor	2nd	Champion	1 Champions Cup	6th
2011–12	Div. Honor	1st	Champion	1 Champions Cup	4th
2012–13	Div. Honor	1st	Champion	1 Champions Cup	3rd
2013–14	Div. Honor	1st	Champion	1 Champions Cup	RU
2014–15	Div. Honor	1st	Champion	1 Champions Cup	RU
2015–16	Div. Honor	1st	Champion	1 Champions Cup	C
2016–17	Div. Honor	1st	Champion	1 Champions Cup	C
2017–18	Div. Honor	3rd	Champion	1 Champions Cup	RU
2018–19	Div. Honor	1st	Champion	1 Champions Cup	RU

== Notable players ==
- (Spain) Alejandro Zarzuela
- (United Kingdom) Terry Bywater
