= CS Meaux (WBC) =

Club Sportif Meaux Handibasket
- Nickname: csMbf
- Leagues: French Wheelchair Basketball Nationale A
- Founded: September 1, 1970
- History: MTI Meaux (1970–1981); CS Meaux (1981–present)
- Arena: Complexe Sportif Tauziet
- Location: Meaux, France
- Team colors: blue and white (historical) violet and orange (actual)
- President: (France) Robert Blandeau
- Head coach: (France) Mario Fahrasmane
- Championships: French Nationale 1A (14); French Cup (13); IWBF Champions Cup (3); André Vergauwen Cup (1); Willi Brinkmann Cup (1)
- Website: club.sportsregions.fr/csmeaux/
Home	Away

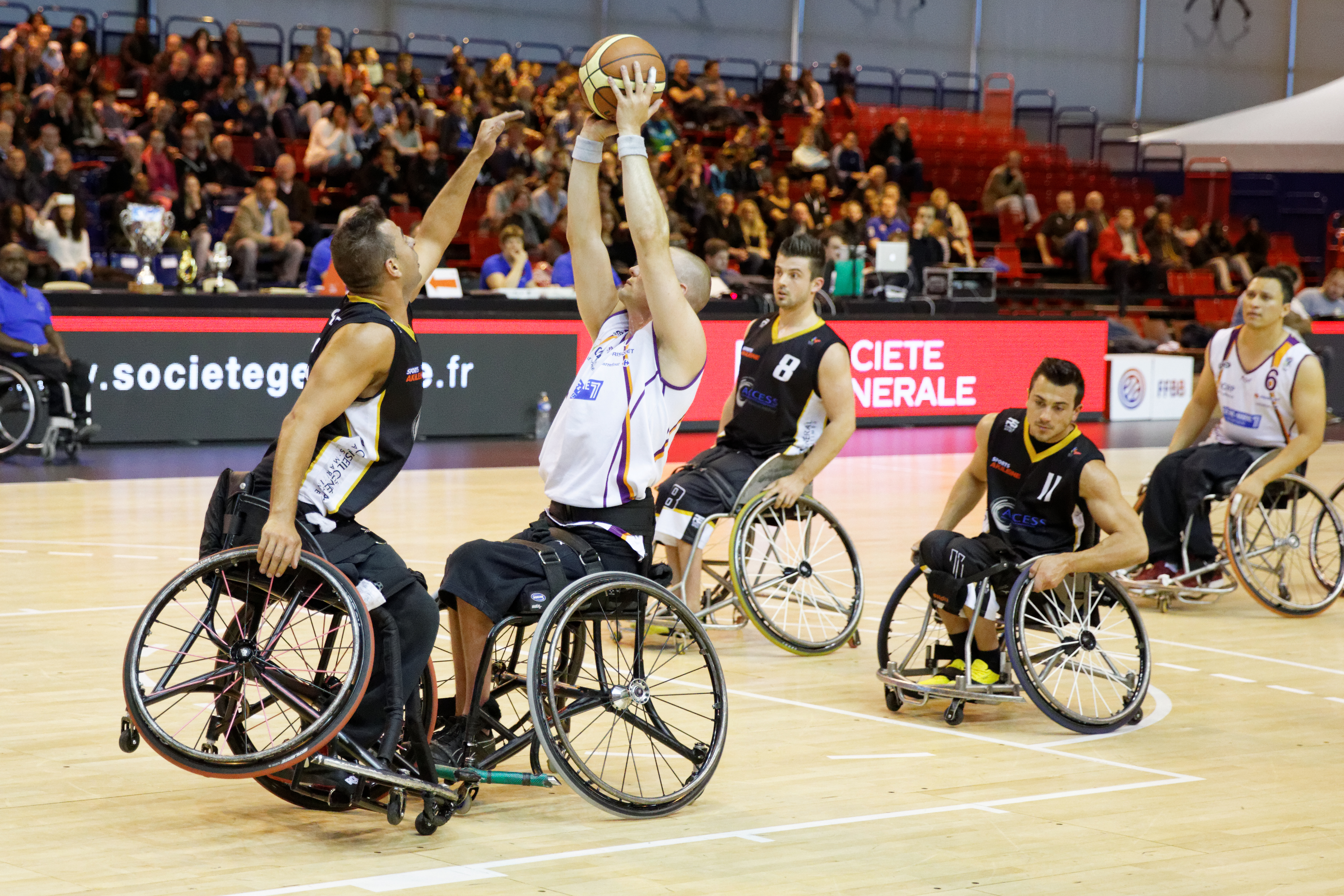
Meaux vs Le Cannet, final of the French Cup in 2015

CS Meaux Handibasket is the wheelchair basketball major sports club in France, with five European titles and eighteen domestic titles.

== Home arenas ==
- Gymnase Fontaine
- Complexe Sportif Tauziet (Halle des Sports Christian Rousel)

== Honors ==
=== Domestic competitions ===
Titles won in French championships:

- French Wheelchair Basketball Nationale 1A:
  - Winners (18): 1980–81, 1992–93, 1993–94, 1994–95, 1995–96, 1996–97, 1997–98, 1998–99, 1999–2000, 2000–01, 2004–05, 2007–08, 2009–10, 2010–11, 2011–12, 2012–13, 2014–15, 2016–17
  - Finalists (7): 2001–02, 2002–03, 2003–04; 2005–06; 2008–09; 2013–14; 2015–16
- French Wheelchair Basketball Nationale 1B (second division):
  - Winners: 1986–87
- French Wheelchair Basketball Nationale 1C (third division):
  - Winners: 2013–14 (by the second team)
- French Wheelchair Basketball Cup:
  - Winners (13): 1992–93, 1993–94, 1994–95, 1995–96, 1996–97, 1997–98, 1998–99, 1999–2000, 2000–01, 2008–09, 2009–10, 2010–11, 2011–12
  - Finalists: 2002–03, 2004–05, 2007–08, 2012–13, 2014–15

=== International competitions ===
Titles won in European championships:

- IWBF Champions Cup:
  - Winners (3): 1998–99, 1999–2000, 2000–01
  - Finalists (2): 1993–94, 1994–95
  - Third place (3): 1995–96, 1996–97, 1997–98
- André Vergauwen Cup:
  - Winners (1): 2009–10
  - Finalists (2): 1980–81 (named MTI Meaux), 1992–93
  - Third place (3): 1990–91, 2014–15, 2015–16
- Willi Brinkmann Cup:
  - Winners (1): 2010–11

== Head coaches ==
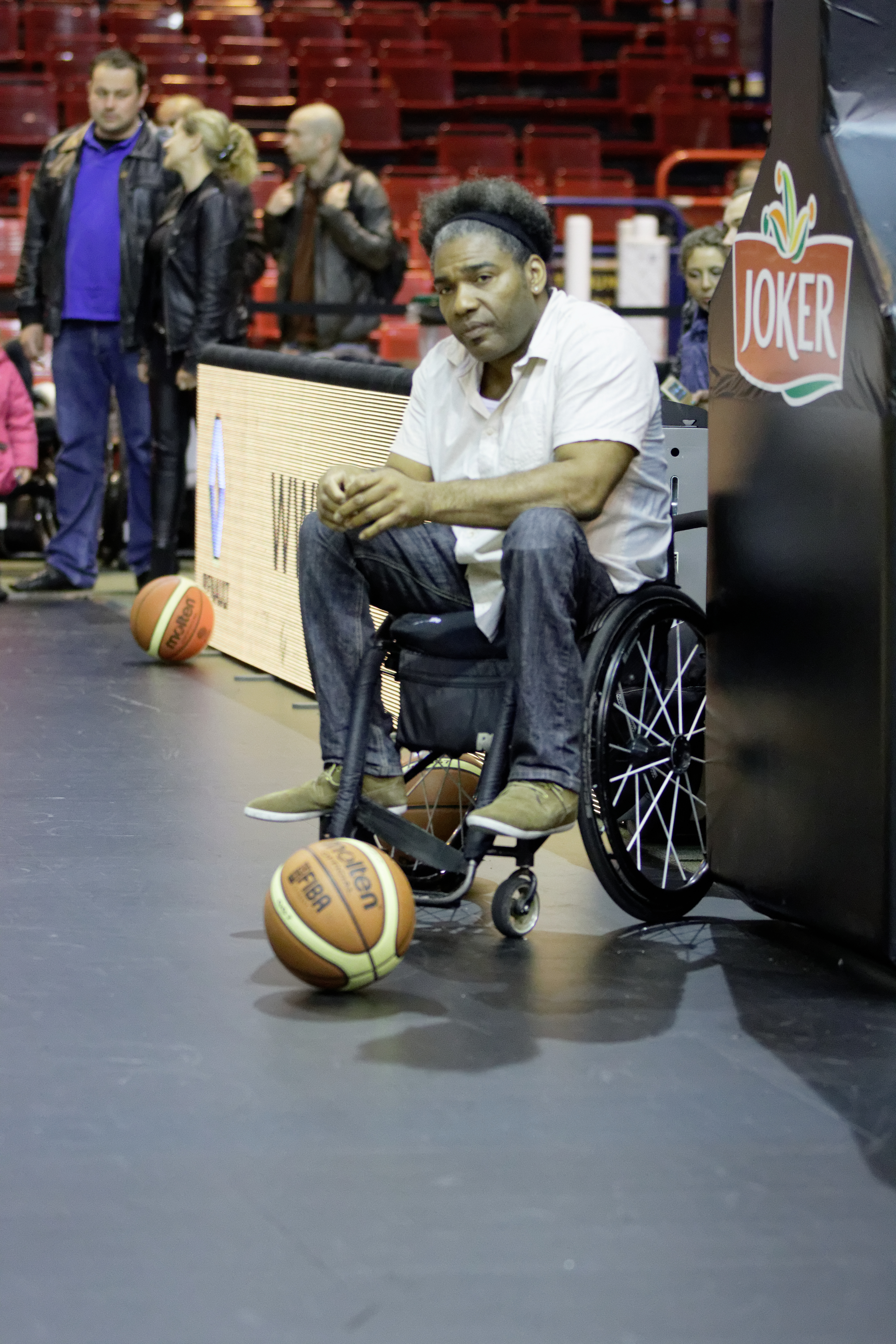
Mario Fahrasmane during the final of the French Cup in 2015

Dates	Name
–2006	(France)
2006–2011	(France) Robert Blandeau
2011–	(France) Mario Fahrasmane
