= UNES FC Barcelona =

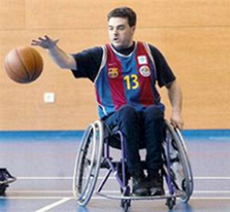
- Leagues: 1ª División
- Founded: 1967
- History: CE Institut Guttmann (1967–2001); FC Barcelona-Institut Guttmann (2001–2007); FC Barcelona (2007–2009); UNES FC Barcelona (2009–present)
- Arena: Pavelló Municipal Juan Carlos Navarro
- Location: Sant Feliu de Llobregat, Catalonia, Spain
- Team colors: Blue, Maroon, Yellow
- Website: unes.cat
Home	Away

UNES FC Barcelona is a Spanish wheelchair basketball team. It is part of both the FC Barcelona family and the UNES Unió Esportiva.

== History ==
From 2001 until 2009, the team agreed collaboration terms with Fundació Institut Guttmann. The latter is a hospital in Catalonia that provides treatment and rehabilitation for people with spinal injury, brain damage, and other neurological disabilities. It is named after Dr. Sir Ludwig Guttmann, founder of the Paralympics and a pioneer of wheelchair sports. Club Esportiu Institut Guttmann was founded in 1967 and is the oldest disabled sports club in Spain. As well as a basketball team it also has boccia, hockey, and wheelchair tennis teams, and promotes athletics, weightlifting, archery, and table tennis.

In 2009, UNES Unió Esportiva collaborates with FC Barcelona which manages the main wheelchair basketball squad.

In 2011, the club resigned to its berth in División de Honor, where it competed since 2000.

In 2012 UNES FC Barcelona won the 2011-12 Primera División.

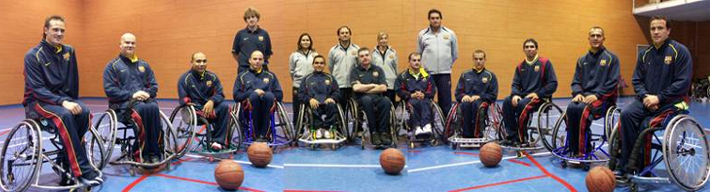
FC Barcelona-Institut Guttman 2006–07 roster

== Honours ==
- Primera División: 2011-12
- Catalan Wheelchair Basketball Cup: 2017, 2021, 2022, 2023
- Catalan Wheelchair Basketball Super Cup: 2017, 2021, 2023

== Season by season ==
Season	Tier	League	Pos	Copa del Rey
2000–01	1	Div. Honor	10th	
2001–02	1	Div. Honor	6th	Quarterfinalist
2002–03	1	Div. Honor	7th	Quarterfinalist
2003–04	1	Div. Honor	7th	Quarterfinalist
2004–05	1	Div. Honor	4th	Quarterfinalist
2005–06	1	Div. Honor	6th	Quarterfinalist
2006–07	1	Div. Honor	6th	4th position
2007–08	1	Div. Honor	4th	4th position
2008–09	1	Div. Honor	3rd	4th position
2009–10	1	Div. Honor	9th	
2010–11	1	Div. Honor	9th	
2011–12	3	1ª División	1st	
2012–13	2	Div. Honor B	5th	
2013–14	2	1ª División	2nd	
2014–15	2	1ª División	4th	
2015–16	2	1ª División	3rd	
2016–17	2	1ª División	3rd	
2017–18	3	2ª División	4th	
2018–19	3	2ª División		
