= Antonio Henares =

Spanish wheelchair basketball player

Personal information
- Full name: Antonio Henares Sierra
- Nationality: Spanish
- Born: 21 November 1956 (age 68); Málaga, Spain

Sport
- Country: Spain
- Sport: Wheelchair basketball

Antonio Henares Sierra (born 21 November 1956) is a wheelchair basketball athlete from Spain. He has a physical disability: he is 4 point wheelchair basketball player. He played wheelchair basketball at the 1996 Summer Paralympics. His team was fourth after being defeated by the United States 66–60 in the bronze medal game.
