= RSV Lahn-Dill =

VMT charge

The RSV Lahn-Dill (shortened: Wheelchair sport association Lahn-Dill, in German: Rollstuhl Sport Verein Lahn-Dill) is an association for wheelchair basketball in Wetzlar. The Association was founded in 1983.

The Association counts to the most successful clubs in Germany, with fourteen German titles championships. It won its first national championship in 1988. In the last years it was one of the most successful clubs worldwide. Lahn-Dill participated in all three European competitions and won the Willi-Brinkmann-Cup finals 2002 in Łódź. The club won the IWBF Champions Cup three consecutive seasons between 2004 and 2006, earning the distinction of being the first German team to win the Champions Cup.
