= EuroCup 2 =

- Sport: Wheelchair basketball
- Founded: 1997
- Organizing body: IWBF
- Region: Europe
- Most recent champion: (Italy) Reggio Calabria BIC (1st title)
- Most titles: (France) Handi-Basket Le Cannet (3 titles)
- Website: www.iwbf-europe.org

The EuroCup 2, formerly called the Willi Brinkmann Cup, is the third level European wheelchair basketball competition for clubs held by the International Wheelchair Basketball Federation.

== Results ==
Year	Winners	Runners-up
1997	(France) Aillant sur Tholon (1)	(Spain) CP Mideba
1998	(France) ASCO Mulhouse (1)	(Spain) CP Mideba
1999	(Italy) Briantea 84 Cantù (1)	(Bosnia and Herzegovina) SKI Zmaj od Bosne
2000	(Spain) CP Mideba (1)	(Spain) CAI Zaragoza
2001	(Germany) SG Heidelberg-Kirchheim (1)	(Israel) Beit Halochem
2002	(Germany) RSV Lahn-Dill (1)	(Italy) CISS AIAS di Afragola
2003	(Italy) CISS AIAS di Afragola (1)	(Israel) Beit Halochem
2004	(Italy) AS Stefano (1)	(Bosnia and Herzegovina) KIK Veterani
2005	(Switzerland) Pilatus Dragons (1)	(Spain) CAI Zaragoza
2006	(Italy) AS Stefano (2)	(Spain) Vital Vigo Amfiv
2007	(Spain) Sandra Gran Canaria (1)	(Turkey) İstanbul Engelli Yıldızlar
2008	(Italy) Padova Millennium Basket (1)	(Spain) Vital Vigo Amfiv
2009	(Germany) ASV Bonn (1)	(Spain) CP Mideba
2010	(Spain) BSR Valladolid (1)	(Spain) Vital Vigo Amfiv
2011	(France) CS Meaux (1)	(Italy) GSD Porto Torres
2012	(Turkey) Beşiktaş JK (1)	(United Kingdom) Oldham Owls
2013	(Italy) GSD Porto Torres (1)	(Italy) Padova Millennium Basket
2014	(France) Handi-Basket Le Cannet (1)	(Italy) GSD Porto Torres
2015	(France) Handi-Basket Le Cannet (2)	(Spain) BSR Valladolid
2016	(Spain) Getafe BSR (1)	(Italy) Las BLS Amicacci Giulianova
2017	(France) Handi-Basket Le Cannet (3)	(Spain) BSR Valladolid
2018	(United Kingdom) Sheffield Steelers WBC (1)	(Spain) BSR ACE Gran Canaria
2019	(Spain) CP Mideba Extremadura (2)	(Italy) SSD Santa Lucia
2022	(France) Red Dragon's Metz (1)	(France) Les Aigles du Puy-en-Velay
2023	(Turkey) Fenerbahçe SK (1)	(Italy) Deco Metalferro Amicacci Abruzzo
2024	(Germany) Hannover United (1)	(Italy) Briantea 84 Cantù
2025	(Germany) Rhine River Rhinos (1)	(France) Hornets Le Cannet
2026	(Italy) Reggio Calabria BIC (1)	(Germany) Hannover United

== Performances ==
=== Titles by club ===
Club	Winners	Runners-up	Years won	Years runner-up
(France) Handi-Basket Le Cannet	3	–	2014, 2015, 2017	
(Spain) CP Mideba	2	3	2000, 2019	1997, 1998, 2009
(Italy) AS Stefano	2	–	2004, 2006	
(Italy) GSD Porto Torres	1	2	2013	2011, 2014
(Spain) BSR Valladolid	1	2	2010	2015, 2017
(Germany) Hannover United	1	1	2024	2026
(Turkey) Fenerbahçe SK / İstanbul Engelli Yıldızlar	1	1	2023	2007
(Italy) Padova Millennium Basket	1	1	2008	2013
(Italy) CISS AIAS di Afragola	1	1	2003	2002
(Italy) Briantea 84 Cantù	1	1	1999	2024
(Italy) Reggio Calabria BIC	1	-	2026	
(Germany) Rhine River Rhinos	1	–	2025	
(France) Red Dragon's Metz	1	–	2022	
(United Kingdom) Sheffield Steelers WBC	1	–	2018	
(Spain) Getafe BSR	1	–	2016	
(Turkey) Beşiktaş JK	1	–	2012	
(France) CS Meaux	1	–	2011	
(Germany) ASV Bonn	1	–	2009	
(Spain) Sandra Gran Canaria	1	–	2007	
(Switzerland) Pilatus Dragons	1	–	2005	
(Germany) RSV Lahn-Dill	1	–	2002	
(Germany) SG Heidelberg-Kirchheim	1	–	2001	
(France) ASCO Mulhouse	1	–	1998	
(France) Aillant sur Tholon	1	–	1997	
(Spain) Vital Vigo Amfiv	–	3		2006, 2008, 2010
(Spain) CAI Zaragoza	–	2		2000, 2005
(Israel) Beit Halochem	–	2		2001, 2003
(France) Hornets Le Cannet	–	1		2025
(Italy) Deco Metalfrro Amicacci Abruzzo	–	1		2023
(France) Les Aigles du Puy-en-Velay	–	1		2022
(Italy) SSD Santa Lucia	–	1		2019
(Spain) BSR ACE Gran Canaria	–	1		2018
(Italy) Las BLS Amicacci Giulianova	–	1		2016
(United Kingdom) Oldham Owls	–	1		2012
(Bosnia and Herzegovina) KIK Veterani	–	1		2004
(Bosnia and Herzegovina) SKI Zmaj od Bosne	–	1		1999

=== Titles by country ===
Country	Won	Runner-up
Italy	7	8
France	7	2
Spain	5	11
Germany	5	1
Turkey	2	1
(United Kingdom) Great Britain	1	1
Switzerland	1	–
(Bosnia and Herzegovina) Bosnia Herzegovina	–	2
Israel	–	2

=== Medals (1997–2026) ===
Rank	Nation	Gold	Silver	Bronze	Total
1	Italy	7	8	4	19
2	France	7	2	3	12
3	Spain	5	11	11	27
4	Germany	5	1	2	8
5	Turkey	2	1	1	4
6	Great Britain	1	1	1	3
7	Switzerland	1	0	0	1
8	Israel	0	2	2	4
9	Bosnia and Herzegovina	0	2	1	3
10	Belgium	0	0	2	2
11	Russia	0	0	1	1
Totals (11 entries)		28	28	28	84

== See also ==
- IWBF Champions League
- EuroCup 1
- EuroCup 3
- Kitakyushu Champions Cup
