= EuroCup 3 =

European wheelchair basketball competition

- Sport: Wheelchair Basketball
- Founded: 2009
- Most recent champion: (Turkey) Beşiktaş (1st title)
- Website: www.iwbf-europe.org

The EuroCup 3, formerly called the IWBF Challenge Cup, is the fourth level European wheelchair basketball competition of the International Wheelchair Basketball Federation.

== Winners ==
| Year | Winners | Runners-up |
| 2009 | (Italy) ASD BADS Quartu Sant'Elena (1) | (Israel) Beit Halochem Tel Aviv |
| 2010 | (Sweden) Norrköping Dolphins (1) | (United Kingdom) Wolverhampton Rhinos |
| 2011 | (Italy) Las BLS Amicacci Giulianova (1) | (Spain) Getafe BSR |
| 2012 | (United Kingdom) Sheffield Steelers WBC (1) | (Italy) GSD Porto Torres |
| 2013 | (Spain) CP Mideba (1) | (Germany) Goldmann Dolphins Trier |
| 2014 | (Germany) BG Basket Hamburg (1) | (Germany) Mainhatten Skywheelers |
| 2015 | (Spain) Amiab Albacete (1) | (Italy) ASD Handicap Sport Varese |
| 2016 | (Spain) Amiab Albacete (2) | (Spain) Bidaideak Bilbao BSR |
| 2017 | (Spain) Vital Vigo Amfiv (1) | (Germany) Rhinos Wiesbaden |
| 2018 | (Italy) CMB Santa Lucia Sport (1) | (Italy) AS Stefano |
| 2019 | (Turkey) 1907 Fenerbahçe Disabled Stars (1) | (Turkey) Gazişehir Gaziantep |
| 2020 | Cancelled due to the COVID-19 pandemic | |
| 2021 | Not held due to the COVID-19 pandemic | |
| 2022 | Not held due to the COVID-19 pandemic | |
| 2023 | (Germany) Hannover United (1) | (Italy) Dinamo Lab Banco di Sardegna Sassari |
| 2024 | (Spain) CD Murcia BSR (1) | (Turkey) İzmir BŞB |
| 2025 | (Spain) Club Amivel (1) | (Italy) Reggio Calabria BIC |
| 2026 | (Turkey) Beşiktaş (1) | (Spain) Club Amivel |

=== Titles by club ===
| Club | Winners | Runners-up | Years won | Years runner-up |
|---|---|---|---|---|
| (Spain) Amiab Albacete | 2 | – | 2015, 2016 | |
| (Turkey) Beşiktaş | 1 | – | 2026 | |
| (Spain) Club Amivel | 1 | 1 | 2025 | 2026 |
| (Spain) CD Murcia BSR | 1 | – | 2024 | |
| (Germany) Hannover United | 1 | – | 2023 | |
| (Turkey) Fenerbahçe SK | 1 | – | 2019 | |
| (Italy) CMB Santa Lucia Sport | 1 | – | 2018 | |
| (Spain) Vital Vigo Amfiv | 1 | – | 2017 | |
| (Germany) BG Basket Hamburg | 1 | – | 2014 | |
| (Spain) CP Mideba | 1 | – | 2013 | |
| (United Kingdom) Sheffield Steelers WBC | 1 | – | 2012 | |
| (Italy) Las BLS Amicacci Giulianova | 1 | – | 2011 | |
| (Sweden) Norrköping Dolphins | 1 | – | 2010 | |
| (Italy) ASD BADS Quartu Sant'Elena | 1 | – | 2009 | |
| (Italy) Reggio Calabria BIC | – | 1 | | 2025 |
| (Turkey) İzmir BŞB | – | 1 | | 2024 |
| (Italy) Dinamo Lab Banco di Sardegna Sassari | – | 1 | | 2023 |
| (Turkey) Gazişehir Gaziantep | – | 1 | | 2019 |
| (Italy) AS Stefano | – | 1 | | 2018 |
| (Germany) Rhinos Wiesbaden | – | 1 | | 2017 |
| (Spain) Bidaideak Bilbao BSR | – | 1 | | 2016 |
| (Italy) ASD Handicap Sport Varese | – | 1 | | 2015 |
| (Germany) Mainhatten Skywheelers | – | 1 | | 2014 |
| (Germany) Goldmann Dolphins Trier | – | 1 | | 2013 |
| (Italy) GSD Porto Torres | – | 1 | | 2012 |
| (Spain) Getafe BSR | – | 1 | | 2011 |
| (United Kingdom) Wolverhampton Rhinos | – | 1 | | 2010 |
| (Israel) Beit Halochem Tel Aviv | – | 1 | | 2009 |

== Medals (2009–2026) ==
| Rank | Nation | Gold | Silver | Bronze | Total |
|---|---|---|---|---|---|
| 1 | Spain | 6 | 3 | 2 | 11 |
| 2 | Italy | 3 | 5 | 2 | 10 |
| 3 | Germany | 2 | 3 | 0 | 5 |
| 4 | Turkey | 2 | 2 | 7 | 11 |
| 5 | Great Britain | 1 | 1 | 0 | 2 |
| 6 | Sweden | 1 | 0 | 1 | 2 |
| 7 | Israel | 0 | 1 | 1 | 2 |
| 8 | France | 0 | 0 | 1 | 1 |
| 8 | Switzerland | 0 | 0 | 1 | 1 |
| Totals (9 entries) | | 15 | 15 | 15 | 45 |

== See also ==
- IWBF Champions League
- EuroCup 1
- EuroCup 2
- Kitakyushu Champions Cup
