= IWBF Champions League =

Wheelchair basketball competition

- Sport: Wheelchair Basketball
- Founded: 1976
- No. of teams: 8
- Country: IWBF Europe members
- Continent: Europe
- Most recent champions: (Spain) CD Ilunion (4th title)
- Most titles: (Germany) RSV Lahn-Dill (7 titles)
- Website: www.iwbf-europe.org

The IWBF Champions League, formerly IWBF Champions Cup, is the top European competition in wheelchair basketball clubs in mens.

== Events ==
Since 2009, the European club competitions work as this:

- Tier 1: IWBF Champions League
- Tier 2: EuroCup 1
- Tier 3: EuroCup 2
- Tier 4: EuroCup 3
- Tier 5: EuroCup 4

== Results ==
| Year | Winners | Runners-up |
|---|---|---|
| 1975 | (Netherlands) ISA Amsterdam (1) | (Netherlands) SC Antilope |
| 1977 | (Netherlands) SC Antilope (1) | (Netherlands) ISA Amsterdam |
| 1978 | (Netherlands) SC Antilope (2) | (Netherlands) ISA Amsterdam |
| 1979 | (Netherlands) R Dordrecht (1) | (Netherlands) SC Antilope |
| 1980 | (Netherlands) SC Antilope (3) | (Netherlands) R Dordrecht |
| 1981 | (Sweden) Norrbacka HIF (1) | (Belgium) GIDOS/Gits |
| 1982 | (Netherlands) AMVJ Amsterdam (1) | (France) AS Berck |
| 1983 | (Netherlands) RBV Aalsmeer (1) | (Netherlands) SC Antilope |
| 1984 | (Netherlands) RBV Aalsmeer (2) | (France) AS Berck |
| 1985 | (France) AS Berck (1) | (Netherlands) RBV Aalsmeer |
| 1986 | (France) AS Berck (2) | (Netherlands) RBV Aalsmeer |
| 1987 | (Netherlands) R Dordrecht (2) | (France) AS Berck |
| 1988 | (Netherlands) R Dordrecht (3) | (France) AS Berck |
| 1989 | (France) AS Berck (3) | (Netherlands) R Dordrecht |
| 1990 | (Netherlands) R Dordrecht (4) | (France) AS Berck |
| 1991 | (Netherlands) BC Verkerk (1) | (France) AS Berck |
| 1992 | (Netherlands) BC Verkerk (2) | (France) AS Berck |
| 1993 | (Netherlands) BC Verkerk (3) | (Italy) Briantea 84 Cantù |
| 1994 | (United Kingdom) Sheffield Steelers WBC (1) | (France) CS Meaux |
| 1995 | (Netherlands) BC Verkerk (4) | (France) CS Meaux |
| 1996 | (Netherlands) BC Verkerk (5) | (Spain) CD Ilunion |
| 1997 | (Spain) CD Ilunion (1) | (France) CS Meaux |
| 1998 | (Italy) CMB Santa Lucia Sport (1) | (Spain) CD Ilunion |
| 1999 | (France) CS Meaux (1) | (United Kingdom) Oldham Owls |
| 2000 | (France) CS Meaux (2) | (United Kingdom) Sheffield Steelers WBC |
| 2001 | (France) CS Meaux (3) | (Italy) GSD Anmic Sassari |
| 2002 | (Italy) GSD Anmic Sassari (1) | (United Kingdom) Sheffield Steelers WBC |
| 2003 | (Italy) CMB Santa Lucia Sport (2) | (Spain) CD Ilunion |
| 2004 | (Germany) RSV Lahn-Dill (1) | (Italy) GSD Anmic Sassari |
| 2005 | (Germany) RSV Lahn-Dill (2) | (Italy) CMB Santa Lucia Sport |
| 2006 | (Germany) RSV Lahn-Dill (3) | (Italy) GSD Anmic Sassari |
| 2007 | (Italy) CMB Santa Lucia Sport (3) | (Germany) RSV Lahn-Dill |
| 2008 | (Turkey) Galatasaray SK (1) | (Germany) RSV Lahn-Dill |
| 2009 | (Turkey) Galatasaray SK (2) | (Germany) RSC Rollis Zwickau |
| 2010 | (Germany) RSV Lahn-Dill (4) | (Italy) CMB Santa Lucia Sport |
| 2011 | (Turkey) Galatasaray SK (3) | (Germany) RSV Lahn-Dill |
| 2012 | (Germany) RSV Lahn-Dill (5) | (Turkey) Galatasaray SK |
| 2013 | (Turkey) Galatasaray SK (4) | (Italy) CMB Santa Lucia Sport |
| 2014 | (Turkey) Galatasaray SK (5) | (Spain) CD Ilunion |
| 2015 | (Germany) RSV Lahn-Dill (6) | (Spain) CD Ilunion |
| 2016 | (Spain) CD Ilunion (2) | (Germany) RSV Lahn-Dill |
| 2017 | (Spain) CD Ilunion (3) | (Italy) Briantea 84 Cantù |
| 2018 | (Germany) RSB Thuringia Bulls (1) | (Spain) CD Ilunion |
| 2019 | (Germany) RSB Thuringia Bulls (2) | (Spain) CD Ilunion |
| 2020 | Cancelled due to the COVID-19 pandemic | |
| 2021 | (Germany) RSV Lahn-Dill (7) | (Germany) RSB Thuringia Bulls |
| 2022 | (Spain) BSR Amiab Albacete (1) | (Spain) CD Ilunion |
| 2023 | (Spain) BSR Amiab Albacete (2) | (Germany) RSB Thuringia Bulls |
| 2024 | (Spain) BSR Amiab Albacete (3) | (Germany) RSB Thuringia Bulls |
| 2025 | (Spain) BSR Amiab Albacete (4) | (Italy) Amicacci Abruzzo Giulianova |
| 2026 | (Spain) CD Ilunion (4) | (Germany) RSB Thuringia Bulls |

== Titles by club ==
| Club | Titles | Runners-up | Years won | Years runner-up |
|---|---|---|---|---|
| (Germany) RSV Lahn-Dill | 7 | 4 | 2004, 2005, 2006, 2010, 2012, 2015, 2021 | 2007, 2008, 2011, 2016 |
| (Turkey) Galatasaray SK | 5 | 1 | 2008, 2009, 2011, 2013, 2014 | 2012 |
| (Netherlands) BC Verkerk | 5 | - | 1991, 1992, 1993, 1995, 1996 | |
| (Spain) CD Fundosa Once / CD Ilunion | 4 | 8 | 1997, 2016, 2017, 2026 | 1996, 1998, 2003, 2014, 2015, 2018, 2019, 2022 |
| (Netherlands) R Dordrecht | 4 | 2 | 1979, 1987, 1988, 1990 | 1980, 1989 |
| (Spain) BSR Amiab Albacete | 4 | - | 2022, 2023, 2024, 2025 | |
| (France) AS Berck | 3 | 7 | 1985, 1986, 1989 | 1982, 1984, 1987, 1988, 1990, 1991, 1992 |
| (Italy) CMB Santa Lucia Sport | 3 | 3 | 1998, 2003, 2007 | 2005, 2010, 2013 |
| (France) CS Meaux | 3 | 3 | 1999, 2000, 2001 | 1994, 1995, 1997 |
| (Netherlands) SC Antilope | 3 | 3 | 1977, 1978, 1980 | 1976, 1979, 1983 |
| (Germany) RSB Thuringia Bulls | 2 | 4 | 2018, 2019 | 2021, 2023, 2024, 2026 |
| (Netherlands) BV Aalsmeer | 2 | 2 | 1983, 1984 | 1985, 1986 |
| (Italy) GSD Anmic Sassari | 1 | 3 | 2002 | 2001, 2004, 2006 |
| (United Kingdom) Sheffield Steelers WBC | 1 | 2 | 1994 | 2000, 2002 |
| (Netherlands) ISA Amsterdam | 1 | 2 | 1976 | 1977, 1978 |
| (Netherlands) AMVJ Amsterdam | 1 | - | 1982 | |
| (Sweden) Norrbacka HIF | 1 | - | 1981 | |
| (Italy) Briantea84 Cantù | - | 2 | | 1993, 2017 |
| (Italy) Amicacci Abruzzo Giulianova | - | 1 | | 2025 |
| (Germany) RSC Rollis Zwickau | - | 1 | | 2009 |
| (United Kingdom) Oldham Owls | - | 1 | | 1999 |
| (Belgium) GIDOS/Gits | - | 1 | | 1981 |

== Titles by country ==
| Country | Titles | Runners-up |
|---|---|---|
| Netherlands | 16 | 9 |
| Germany | 9 | 9 |
| Spain | 8 | 8 |
| France | 6 | 10 |
| Turkey | 5 | 1 |
| Italy | 4 | 9 |
| (United Kingdom) Great Britain | 1 | 3 |
| Sweden | 1 | |
| Belgium | | 1 |

== Medals (1975–2026) ==
| Rank | Nation | Gold | Silver | Bronze | Total |
|---|---|---|---|---|---|
| 1 | Netherlands | 16 | 9 | 2 | 27 |
| 2 | Germany | 9 | 9 | 15 | 33 |
| 3 | Spain | 8 | 8 | 7 | 23 |
| 4 | France | 6 | 10 | 5 | 21 |
| 5 | Turkey | 5 | 1 | 0 | 6 |
| 6 | Italy | 4 | 9 | 9 | 22 |
| 7 | Great Britain | 1 | 3 | 7 | 11 |
| 8 | Sweden | 1 | 0 | 2 | 3 |
| 9 | Belgium | 0 | 1 | 3 | 4 |
| Totals (9 entries) | | 50 | 50 | 50 | 150 |

== See also ==
- European Wheelchair Basketball Championship
- EuroCup 1
- EuroCup 2
- EuroCup 3
- Kitakyushu Champions Cup
- EuroLeague
- EuroLeague Women
- EuroBasket
- EuroBasket Women
