= EuroCup 1 =

Wheelchair basketball competition

- Sport: Wheelchair basketball
- Founded: 1977
- Most recent champion: (Turkey) Fenerbahçe SK (2nd)
- Website: www.iwbf-europe.org

The EuroCup 1, formerly called the André Vergauwen Cup, is the second level European wheelchair basketball competition for clubs held by the International Wheelchair Basketball Federation.

== Results ==
Year	Winners	Runners-up
1977	(Germany) RSG Frankfurt (1)	(Germany) RSG Koblenz
1978	(France) ASHPA Strasbourg (1)	(Netherlands) SC Antilope B
1979	(Belgium) SV St. Jan Brugge (1)	(Belgium) Feniks Wetteren
1980	(Belgium) MEC Charleroi (1)	(Belgium) Feniks Wetteren
1981	(Belgium) Feniks Lokeren (1)	(France) MTI Meaux
1988	(Italy) CMB Santa Lucia Sport (1)	(United Kingdom) LSG Jets
1989	(France) ASPHA Douai (1)	(Netherlands) SC Antilope
1990	(United Kingdom) Sheffield Steelers WBC (1)	(Netherlands) SC Antilope
1991	(Germany) BSG Duisburg-Buchholz (1)	(Germany) UBC Münster
1992	(Germany) UBC Münster (1)	(Netherlands) RBV Aalsmeer
1993	(Netherlands) ISA Amsterdam (1)	(France) CS Meaux
1994	(Italy) US HA Corvino Sport (1)	(United Kingdom) Oldham Owls
1995	(United Kingdom) Oldham Owls (1)	(Germany) UBC Münster
1996	(Italy) AS Stefano (1)	(Germany) UBC Münster
1997	(United Kingdom) MK Aces WBC (1)	(Belgium) Brussels WBB
1998	(United Kingdom) Sheffield Steelers WBC (2)	(Spain) CP Mideba
1999	(Germany) ASV Bonn (1)	(Italy) GSD Anmic Sassari
2000	(United Kingdom) MK Aces WBC (2)	(Germany) RSC Rollis Zwickau
2001	(Italy) Briantea 84 Cantù (1)	(Netherlands) Arrows'81
2002	(Italy) CMB Santa Lucia Sport (2)	(United Kingdom) MK Aces WBC
2003	(Italy) GSD Porto Torres (1)	(Turkey) İzmir BŞB
2004	(Germany) RSC Rollis Zwickau (1)	(Spain) Sandra Gran Canaria
2005	(Italy) Briantea 84 Cantù (2)	(United Kingdom) Sheffield Steelers WBC
2006	(Germany) RSC Rollis Zwickau (2)	(Belgium) SV St. Jan Brugge
2007	(Italy) AS Dream Team (1)	(Germany) ASV Bonn
2008	(Spain) CD ONCE Andalucía (1)	(Italy) GSD Anmic Sassari
2009	(Italy) CMB Santa Lucia Sport (3)	(United Kingdom) MK Aces WBC
2010	(France) CS Meaux (1)	(Turkey) Beşiktaş JK
2011	(Turkey) Beşiktaş JK (1)	(Germany) Köln 99ers
2012	(Italy) Las BLS Amicacci Giulianova (1)	(Netherlands) BC Verkerk
2013	(Italy) Briantea 84 Cantù (3)	(Italy) GSD Anmic Sassari
2014	(Germany) RSB Team Thüringen (1)	(Turkey) Beşiktaş JK
2015	(Germany) GOLDMANN Dolphins Trier (1)	(France) Hyeres Handi Basket
2016	(Germany) RSB Team Thüringen (2)	(Germany) BG Baskets Hamburg
2017	(Turkey) Galatasaray SK (1)	(Spain) Amiab Albacete
2018	(Turkey) Galatasaray SK (2)	(Spain) Bidaideak Bilbao BSR
2019	(Spain) Bidaideak Bilbao BSR (1)	(Turkey) Beşiktaş JK
2020	Not held due to COVID-19 pandemic	
2021	Not held due to COVID-19 pandemic	
2022	(Spain) BSR ACE Gran Canaria (1)	(Israel) Ilan Ramat Gan
2023	(Italy) A. S. D. Santo Stefano Sport KOS Group (2)	(Spain) Bidaideak Bilbao BSR
2024	(Turkey) Fenerbahçe SK (1)	(Spain) Bidaideak Bilbao BSR
2025	(Turkey) Galatasaray SK (3)	(France) Les Aigles du Velay
2026	(Turkey) Fenerbahçe SK (2)	(Turkey) Galatasaray SK

== Performances ==
=== Titles by club ===
Club	Winners	Runners-up	Years won	Years runner-up
(Turkey) Galatasaray SK	3	1	2017, 2018, 2025	2026
(Italy) Briantea 84 Cantù	3	—	2001, 2005, 2013	
(Italy) CMB Santa Lucia Sport	3	—	1988, 2002, 2009	
(United Kingdom) MK Aces WBC	2	2	1997, 2000	2002, 2009
(Germany) RSC Rollis Zwickau	2	1	2004, 2006	2000
(United Kingdom) Sheffield Steelers WBC	2	1	1990, 1998	2005
(Turkey) Fenerbahçe SK	2	—	2024, 2026	
(Italy) A. S. D. Santo Stefano Sport KOS Group/ AS Stefano	2	—	1996, 2023	
(Germany) RSB Team Thüringen	2	—	2014, 2016	
(Spain) Bidaideak Bilbao BSR	1	3	2019	2018, 2023, 2024
(Turkey) Beşiktaş JK	1	3	2011	2010, 2014, 2019
(Germany) UBC Münster	1	3	1992	1991, 1995, 1996
(France) MTI Meaux/CS Meaux	1	2	2010	1981, 1993
(Spain) BSR ACE Gran Canaria/ Sandra Gran Canaria	1	1	2022	2004
(Germany) ASV Bonn	1	1	1999	2007
(United Kingdom) Oldham Owls	1	1	1995	1994
(Belgium) SV St. Jan Brugge	1	1	1979	2006
(Germany) Goldmann Dolphins Trier	1	—	2015	
(Italy) Las BLS Amicacci Giulianova	1	—	2012	
(Spain) CD ONCE Andalucía	1	—	2008	
(Italy) AS Dream Team	1	—	2007	
(Italy) GSD Porto Torres	1	—	2003	
(Italy) US HA Corvino Sport	1	—	1994	
(Netherlands) ISA Amsterdam	1	—	1993	
(Germany) BSG Duisburg-Buchholz	1	—	1991	
(France) ASPHA Douai	1	—	1989	
(Belgium) Feniks Lokeren	1	—	1981	
(Belgium) MEC Charleroi	1	—	1980	
(France) ASPHA Strasbourg	1	—	1978	
(Germany) RSG Frankfurt	1	—	1977	
(Italy) GSD Anmic Sassari	—	3		1999, 2008, 2013
(Netherlands) SC Antilope	—	2		1989, 1990
(Belgium) Feniks Wetteren	—	2		1979, 1980
(France) Les Aigles du Velay	—	1		2025
(Israel) Ilan Ramat Gan	—	1		2022
(Spain) Amiab Albacete	—	1		2017
(Germany) BG Baskets Hamburg	—	1		2016
(France) Hyeres Handi Basket	—	1		2015
(Netherlands) BC Verkerk	—	1		2012
(Germany) Köln 99ers	—	1		2011
(Turkey) İzmir BŞB	—	1		2003
(Netherlands) Arrows'81	—	1		2001
(Spain) CP Mideba	—	1		1998
(Belgium) Brussels WBB	—	1		1997
(Netherlands) RBV Aalsmeer	—	1		1992
(United Kingdom) LSG Jets	—	1		1988
(Netherlands) SC Antilope B	—	1		1978
(Germany) RSG Koblenz	—	1		1977

=== Titles by country ===
Country	Won	Runner-up
Italy	12	3
Germany	9	8
Turkey	6	5
(United Kingdom) Great Britain	5	5
Spain	3	6
Belgium	3	4
France	3	4
Netherlands	1	6
Israel	-	1

=== Medals (1977–2026) ===
Rank	Nation	Gold	Silver	Bronze	Total
1	Italy	12	3	6	21
2	Germany	9	8	4	21
3	Turkey	6	5	2	13
4	Great Britain	5	5	1	11
5	Spain	3	6	8	17
6	France	3	4	12	19
7	Belgium	3	4	2	9
8	Netherlands	1	6	4	11
9	Israel	0	1	2	3
10	Austria	0	0	1	1
Totals (10 entries)		42	42	42	126

== See also ==
- IWBF Champions League
- EuroCup 2
- EuroCup 3
- Kitakyushu Champions Cup
