= 2022 in basketball =

The following are the basketball events of the year 2022 throughout the world.

The following are basketball events that took place in 2022 throughout the world. Tournaments include international (FIBA), professional (club), and amateur and collegiate levels.

== International tournaments ==
=== National senior team tournaments ===
Tournament	Host city	Duration	(gold) Champion	(silver) Second place	(bronze) Third place
2022 FIBA Women's Basketball World Cup	(Australia) Sydney	September 22 – October 1	United States	China	Australia

=== 3X3 championships ===
==== Men ====
Tournament	Host city	Duration	(gold) Champion	(silver) Second place	(bronze) Third place
2022 FIBA 3x3 AmeriCup	(United States) Miami	November 4–6	United States	Puerto Rico	Brazil

==== Women ====
Tournament	Host city	Duration	(gold) Champion	(silver) Second place	(bronze) Third place
2022 FIBA Women's 3x3 AmeriCup	(United States) Miami	November 4–6	Canada	Brazil	United States

== Professional club seasons ==
=== FIBA Intercontinental Cup ===
Champion	Runner-up	Result	Playoff format
(Brazil) Flamengo	(Spain) San Pablo Burgos	75–62	Single-game final

=== Continental seasons ===
==== Men ====
Organizer	Tournament	Champion	Runner-up	Result	Playoff format
Euroleague Basketball	2021–22 EuroLeague	(Turkey) Anadolu Efes	(Spain) Real Madrid	58–57	Single-game final
Euroleague Basketball	2021–22 EuroCup Basketball	(Italy) Virtus Bologna	(Turkey) Bursaspor	80–67	Single-game final
FIBA	2022 FIBA Asia Champions Cup				Cancelled
FIBA	2021–22 Basketball Champions League	(Spain) Lenovo Tenerife	(Spain) Baxi Manresa	98–87	Single-game final
FIBA	2021–22 BCL Americas	(Brazil) São Paulo	(Uruguay) Biguá	98–84	Single-game final
FIBA	2021–22 FIBA Europe Cup	(Turkey) Bahçeşehir Koleji	(Italy) Reggiana	162–143	Best on aggregate
NBA/FIBA	2022 BAL season	(Tunisia) US Monastir	(Angola) Petro de Luanda	83–72	Single-game final

==== Women ====
Organizer	Tournament	Champion	Runner-up	Result	Playoff format
FIBA	2021–22 EuroLeague Women	(Hungary) Sopron Basket	(Turkey) Fenerbahçe	60–55	Single-game final
FIBA	2021–22 EuroCup Women	(France) Tango Bourges	(Italy) Reyer Venezia	74–38	Single-game final

=== Regional seasons ===
==== Men ====
Region	League	Champion	Runner-up	Result	Playoff format
Former Yugoslavia	2021–22 ABA League	(Serbia) Crvena zvezda mts	(Serbia) Partizan NIS	3–2	Best-of-5 series
Former Yugoslavia	2021–22 ABA 2nd League	(Serbia) Zlatibor	(North Macedonia) MZT Skopje Aerodrom	78–73	Single-game final
Alpe-Adria	2021–22 Alpe Adria Cup	(Slovakia) Levickí Patrioti	(Czech Republic) JIP Pardubice	82–63	Single-game final
Estonia and Latvia	2021–22 Latvian–Estonian Basketball League	(Latvia) VEF Riga	(Estonia) Viimsi/Sportland	95–64	Single-game final
Balkans	2021–22 BIBL	(Israel) Hapoel Galil Elyon	(Israel) Maccabi Haifa	86–70	Single-game final
Belgium and Netherlands	2021–22 BNXT League	(Netherlands) ZZ Leiden	(Netherlands) Donar Groningen	146–142	Best-on aggregate
Belgium and Netherlands	2022 BNXT Supercup	(Belgium) Filou Oostende	(Netherlands) Heroes Den Bosch	90–82	Single-game final

==== Women ====
Region	League	Champion	Runner-up	Result	Playoff format
Southeast Europe	2021–22 WABA League	(Slovenia) Cinkarna Celje	(Montenegro) Budućnost Bemax	58–51	Single-game final

== Domestic league seasons ==
=== Men ===
==== Europe ====
Nation	Tournament	Champion	Runner-up	Result	Playoff format
Albania	2021–22 Albanian Basketball League	Teuta	Vllaznia	3–1	Best-of-5 series
Albania	2021–22 Albanian Basketball Cup				
Albania	2022 Albanian Basketball Supercup				
Armenia	2021–22 Armenia Basketball League A				
Austria	2021–22 Österreichische Basketball Bundesliga season	GGMT Vienna	Swans Gmunden	3–1	Best-of-5 series
Austria	2021–22 Austrian Basketball Cup	GGMT Vienna	Oberwart	92–70	Single-game final
Austria	2022 Austrian Basketball Supercup				
Azerbaijan	2022 Azerbaijan Basketball League	Cancelled			
Belarus	2021–22 Belarusian Premier League	Tsmoki Minsk	Borisfen	3–0	Best-of-5 series
Belgium	2022 BNXT League Belgian Playoffs	Oostende	Kangoeroes Mechelen	3–1	Best-of-5 series
Belgium	2021–22 Belgian Basketball Cup	Limburg United	Oostende	79–73	Single-game final
Belgium	2022 Belgian Basketball Supercup				
Bosnia and Herzegovina	2021–22 Basketball Championship of Bosnia and Herzegovina	Igokea	HKK Široki	League standings	
Bosnia and Herzegovina	2021–22 Basketball Cup of Bosnia and Herzegovina				
Bulgaria	2021–22 National Basketball League	Balkan	Rilski Sportist	3–1	Best-of-5 series
Bulgaria	2022 Bulgarian Basketball Cup	Rilski Sportist	Leviski Sofia	92–86	Single-game final
Croatia	2021–22 Hrvatski telekom Premijer liga	KK Cibona	KK Zadar	3–2	Best-of-5 series
Croatia	2021–22 Krešimir Ćosić Cup				
Cyprus	2021–22 Cyprus Basketball Division A	Keravnos	AEK Laranca	3–2	Best-of-5 series
Cyprus	2021–22 Cypriot Basketball Cup				
Czech Republic	2021–22 NBL (Czech Republic)	ERA Nymburk	BK Opava	3–1	Best-of-5 series
Czech Republic	2021–22 Czech Republic Basketball Cup	BK Opava	ERA Nymburk	97–93	Single-game final
Denmark	2021–22 Basketligaen	Bakken Bears	Svendborg	4–0	Best-of-7 series
Denmark	2021–22 Danish Basketball Cup	Svendborg Rabbits	Bakken Bears	87–85	Single-game final
England	2021–22 National Basketball League Division 1	Solent Kestrels	Hemel Storm	71–69	Single-game final
England	2021–22 National Basketball League Division 2	Manchester Magic	Solent Kestrels II	88–87	Single-game final
England	2021–22 National Basketball League Division 3	Teesside Lions	Worcester Wolves	65–56	Single-game final
Estonia	2021–22 Estonian Championship	Pärnu Sadam	BC Tartu	3–0	Best-of-5 series
Estonia	2022 Estonian Basketball Cup	BC Kalev/Cramo	Viimsi/Sportland	77–64	Single-game final
Finland	2021–22 Korisliiga season				
Finland	2021–22 Finnish Basketball Cup				
France (Note: Includes one team from Monaco.)	2021–22 Pro A season	LDLC ASVEL	Monaco	3–2	Best-of-5 series
France	2021–22 French Basketball Cup				
France	2022 Leaders Cup				
Georgia	2021–22 Georgian Superliga				
Germany	2021–22 Basketball Bundesliga	Alba Berlin	Bayern Munich	3–1	Best-of-5 series
Germany	2021–22 BBL-Pokal	Alba Berlin	Crailsheim Merlins	86–76	Single-game final
Great Britain	2021–22 BBL	Leicester Riders	London Lions	78–75	Single-game final
Great Britain	2021–22 BBL Cup	Leicester Riders	Manchester Giants	83–69	Single-game final
Great Britain	2021–22 BBL Trophy	Cheshire Phoenix	London Lions	82–68	Single-game final
Greece	2021–22 Greek Basket League				
Greece	2021–22 Greek Basketball Cup				
Greece	2022 Greek Basketball Super Cup				
Hungary	2021–22 Nemzeti Bajnokság I/A				
Hungary	2022 Magyar Kupa				
Iceland	2021–22 Úrvalsdeild karla				
Iceland	2021–22 Icelandic Basketball Cup				
Ireland	2021–22 Super League				
Israel	2021–22 Israeli Basketball Premier League				
Israel	2021–22 Israeli Basketball State Cup				
Israel	2022 Israeli Basketball League Cup				
Italy	2021–22 LBA	AX Armani Exchange Milano	Virtus Segafredo Bologna	4–3	Best-of-7 series
Italy	2022 Italian Basketball Cup				
Italy	2022 Italian Basketball Supercup				
Kosovo	2021–22 Kosovo Basketball Superleague				
Kosovo	2021–22 Kosovo Basketball Cup				
Latvia	2021–22 Latvian Basketball League				
Lithuania	2021–22 LKL season				
Lithuania	2022 King Mindaugas Cup				
Luxembourg	2021–22 Total League season				
Malta	2021–22 Division 1				
Moldova	2021–22 Moldovan National Division				
Montenegro	2021–22 Prva A liga				
Montenegro	2021–22 Montenegrin Basketball Cup				
Netherlands	2022 BNXT League Dutch Playoffs	Heroes Den Bosch	ZZ Leiden	3–2	Best-of-5 series
Netherlands	2021–22 NBB Cup	Donar	Heroes Den Bosch	76–71	Single-game final
Netherlands	2022 Dutch Basketball Supercup				
North Macedonia	2021–22 Macedonian First League				
North Macedonia	2021–22 Macedonian Basketball Cup				
Norway	2021–22 BLNO season				
Poland	2021–22 PLK season				
Poland	2022 Polish Basketball Cup				
Poland	2022 Polish Basketball Supercup				
Portugal	2021–22 LPB season				
Portugal	2021–22 Portuguese Basketball Cup	Sporting CP	Benfica	79–75	Single-game final
Portugal	2021–22 Portuguese Basketball League Cup	Sporting CP	Benfica	66–64	Single-game final
Portugal	2021–22 Portuguese Basketball Super Cup	Sporting CP	Benfica	89–84	Single-game final
Romania	2020–21 Liga Națională				
Romania	2022 Romanian Basketball Cup				
Russia	2021–22 VTB United League (Note: Includes one team each from Belarus and Kazakhstan. The highest-ranked team from Russia is also named as Russian Champions.)				
Russia	2021–22 Russian Basketball Cup				
Scotland	2021–22 Scottish Basketball Championship	St Mirren	Falkirk Fury	154–142	Best on aggregate
Scotland	2021–22 Scottish Cup	Falkirk Fury	Dunfermline Reign	68–63	Single-game final
Serbia	2021–22 Basketball League of Serbia				
Serbia	2021–22 Second Basketball League of Serbia	Spartak Office Shoes	Čačak 94	League standings	
Serbia	2021–22 Radivoj Korać Cup	Crvena zvezda mts	Partizan NIS	85–68	Single-game final
Slovakia	2021–22 Slovak Basketball League				
Slovakia	2021–22 Slovak Basketball Cup				
Slovenia	2021–22 Slovenian Basketball League				
Slovenia	2021–22 Slovenian Basketball Cup				
Slovenia	2022 Slovenian Basketball Supercup				
Spain (Note: Includes one team from Andorra.)	2021–22 ACB season	Real Madrid	Barça	3–1	Best-of-5 series
Spain	2022 Copa del Rey de Baloncesto	Barça	Real Madrid	64–59	Single-game final
Spain	2022 Supercopa de España de Baloncesto				
Sweden	2021–22 Basketligan season	Norrköping Dolphins	Jämtland	4–2	Best-of-7 final
Switzerland	2021–22 SBL				
Switzerland	2021–22 SBL Cup				
Turkey	2021–22 Basketbol Süper Ligi	Fenerbahçe	Anadolu Efes	3–1	Best-of-5 final
Turkey	2022 Turkish Basketball Cup	Anadolu Efes	Fenerbahçe	86–72	Single-game final
Turkey	2022 Turkish Basketball Presidential Cup	Anadolu Efes	Fenerbahçe	71–62	Single-game final
Ukraine	2021–22 SuperLeague	Abandoned due to the 2022 Russian invasion of Ukraine			
Ukraine	2021–22 Ukrainian Basketball Cup	Abandoned due to the 2022 Russian invasion of Ukraine			

==== Asia ====
Nation	Tournament	Champion	Runner-up	Result	Playoff format
Bahrain	2021–22 Bahraini Premier League	Manama Club	Al-Muharraq	2–1	Best-of-3 series
China	2021–22 Chinese Basketball Association season	Liaoning Flying Leopards	Zhejiang Lions	4–0	Best-of-7 series
China	2022 National Basketball League	Guangxi Rhino	Shaanxi Wolves	2–0	Best-of-3 series
Hong Kong	2022 Hong Kong A1 Division Championship				
India	2022 UBA Pro Basketball League				
Indonesia	2022 IBL Indonesia	Satria Muda Pertamina	Pelita Jaya Bakrie	2–0	Best-of-3 series
Iran	2021–22 Iranian Basketball Super League	Shahrdari Gorgan	Zob Ahan Isfahan	3–1	Best-of-5 series
Iraq	2021–22 Iraqi Basketball Premier League	Al-Naft	Al-Shorta	4–1	Best-of-7 series
Japan	2021–22 B.League season (B1 League)				
Japan	2021–22 B.League season (B2 League)				
Japan	2021–22 B.League season (B3 League)				
Jordan	2021–22 Jordanian Premier Basketball League	Al-Wehdat	Orthodox	3–0	Best-of-3 series
Kazakhstan	2021–22 Kazakhstan Basketball Championship	Astana	Barsy Atyrau	3–0	Best-of-5 series
Kuwait	2021–22 Kuwaiti Division 1 Basketball League	Kuwait SC	Kazma	3–0	Best-of-5 series
Lebanon	2021–22 Lebanese Basketball League	Beirut Club	Al Riyadi Beirut	4–3	Best-of-7 series
Lebanon	2022 Lebanese Basketball Cup				
Palestine	2021–22 Palestine Premier League	Orthodoxi Ramallah	Orthodoxi Beit Sahour	76–68	Single-game final
Philippines	2021 PBA Governors' Cup	Barangay Ginebra San Miguel	Meralco Bolts	4–2	Best-of-7 series
Philippines	2022 PBA Philippine Cup	San Miguel Beermen	TNT Tropang Giga	4–3	Best-of-7 series
Qatar	2021–22 Qatari Basketball League	Al Sadd	Al-Gharafa	2–1	Best-of-3 series
Saudi Arabia	2021–22 Saudi Premier League (basketball)	Al Nasr Riyadh	Al Hilal	78–70	Single-game final
Saudi Arabia	2021–22 Saudi Basketball First Division	Al-Adalah	Al Taawoun	League standings	
South Korea	2021–22 KBL season	Seoul SK Knights	Anyang KGC	4–1	Best-of-7 series
Syria	2021–22 Syrian Basketball League season	Al-Ittihad Aleppo	Al-Karamah	3–0	Best-of-5 series
Taiwan	2021–22 T1 League season	Kaohsiung Steelers	Taichung Wagor Suns	3–0	Best-of-5 series
Taiwan	2021–22 P League+	Taipei Fubon Braves	Hsinchu JKO Lioneers	3–2	Best-of-5 series
Thailand	2022 Thailand Basketball League				
United Arab Emirates	2021–22 UAE National Basketball League	Shabab Al Ahli	Sharjah	2–1	Best-of-5 series
Vietnam	2022 VBA season				

==== Americas ====
Nation	Tournament	Champion	Runner-up	Result	Playoff format
Argentina	2021–22 Liga Nacional de Básquet Season	Instituto	Quimsa	3–2	Best-of-5 series
Argentina	2021–22 La Liga Argentina de Básquet season	Independiente de Oliva	Zarate Basket Independiente	3–0	Best-of-5 series
Brazil	2021–22 NBB season	Franca	Flamengo	3–1	Best-of-5 series
Brazil	2021–22 Liga Ouro de Basquete season				
Bolivia	2022 Libobasquet season	Pichincha de Potosí	Atomico Calero	3–2	Best-of-5 season
Canada	2021–22 NBL Canada season	London Lightning	KW Titans		
Canada	2022 CEBL season	Hamilton Honey Badgers	Scarborough Shooting Stars	90–88	Single-game final
Chile	2022 Liga Nacional de Básquetbol de Chile	Universidad de Concepción	Colegio Los Leones de Quilpué	4–2	Best-of-7 series
Colombia	2022 Baloncesto Profesional Colombiano season (Apertura)	Titanes de Barranquilla	Cafeteros de Armenia	3–0	Best-of-5 series
Cuba	2022 Liga Superior de Baloncesto season	Ciego de Ávila	Gallos de Sancti Spíritus	3–0	Best-of-5 series
Mexico	2021–22 CIBACOPA Season				
United States (Note: The NBA and the G League each include one team from Canada.)	2021–22 NBA season	Golden State Warriors	Boston Celtics	4–2	Best-of-7 series
United States	2021–22 NBA G League season	Rio Grande Valley Vipers	Delaware Blue Coats	2–0	Best-of-3 series
United States	2022 NBA Summer League	Portland Trail Blazers	New York Knicks	85–77	Single-game final
Uruguay	2021–22 LUB season	Biguá	Peñarol	4–1	Best-of-7 series
Venezuela	2021–22 Venezuelan SuperLiga				

==== African ====
Nation	Tournament	Champion	Runner-up	Result	Playoff format
Algeria	2021–22 Algerian Basketball Championship	NB Staoueli	WA Boufarik	64–59	Single-game final
Algeria	2021–22 Algerian Basketball Cup	WA Boufarik	TRA Draria	74–60	Single-game final
Angola	2021–22 Angolan Basketball League	Petro de Luanda	Interclube	3–0	Best-of-5 series
Angola	2021–22 Angolan Cup	Petro de Luanda	Interclube	107–88	Single-game final
Angola	2022 Angolan Supercup				
Benin	2021–22 Benin Professional Basketball League	Elan Coton	ASPAL	64–59	Single-game final
Botswana	2022 BBA season				
Cape Verde	2022 CBVL season	Mindelo Monstro	Txada Panthers	2–0	Best-of-3 series
Cameroon	2021–22 Elite Messieurs	FAP	Ecole de Basket	Final Four standings	
Cameroon	2022 Cup of Cameroon	FAP	Ecole de Basket	103–59	Single-game final
Egypt	2021–22 Egyptian Basketball Super League	Al Ahly	Al Ittihad Alexandria	3–2	Best-of-5 series
Egypt	2021–22 Egypt Basketball Cup	Al Ahly	Al Ittihad Alexandria	69–65	Single-game final
Egypt	2021–22 Egyptian Super Cup				
Ivory Coast	2022 Ivory Coast National Basketball Championship	ABC Fighters	Azur	2–0	Best-of-3 series
Kenya	2021–22 KBF Premier League	KPA	Ulinzi Warriors	3–2	Best-of-5 series
Libya	2021–22 Libyan Division I Basketball League	Al Ahli Tripoli	Al-Ahly Benghazi	League standings	
Libya	2022 Libyan Basketball Cup				
Madagascar	2022 N1A season				
Mali	2021–22 Ligue 1				
Mali	2022 Malian Cup				
Morocco	2021–22 Division Excellence	AS Salé	FUS Rabat	2–0	Best-of-3 series
Morocco	2021–22 Moroccan Throne Cup	Ittihad Tanger	FUS Rabat	75–63	Single-game final
Mozambique	2022 Liga Moçambicana de Basquetebol	Ferroviário da Beira	Ferroviário de Maputo	3–0	Best-of-5 series
Nigeria	2022 NBBF President Cup				
Rwanda	2021–22 RBL season				
Rwanda	2021–22 RBL Division 2 season	Kigali Titans	Orion BBC	70–61	Single-game final
Senegal	2022 Nationale 1 season				
Senegal	2022 Coupe Saint Michel	Jeanne d'Arc	AS Douanes	65–63	Single-game final
Senegal	2022 Senegalese Basketball Cup				
Senegal	2022 Senegalese Mayor's Cup				
Tunisia	2021–22 Championnat National A	US Monastir	Ezzahra Sports	3–1	Best-of-5 series
Tunisia	2022 Tunisian Basketball Cup	US Monastir	Club Africain	96–84	Single-game final
Uganda	2022 NBL Uganda season				

==== Oceania ====
Nation	Tournament	Champion	Runner-up	Result	Playoff format
Australia	2021–22 NBL season	Sydney Kings	Tasmania JackJumpers	3–0	Best-of-5 series
New Zealand	2022 New Zealand NBL season				

==== Other Country ====
Nation	Tournament	Champion	Runner-up	Result	Playoff format
North Cyprus	2021–22 Erkekler Basketbol Süper Ligi				

=== Women ===
==== Europe ====
Nation	Tournament	Champion	Runner-up	Result	Playoff format
Albania	2021–22 Albanian A-1 League				
Albania	2022 Albanian Basketball Cup				
Albania	2022 Albanian Basketball Supercup				
Austria	2021–22 Austrian Women's Basketball Bundesliga				
Belarus	2021–22 Belarus Women's premier League				
Belgium	2021–22 Belgian Women's Basketball League				
Bosnia and Herzegovina	2021–22 Basketball Championship of Bosnia and Herzegovina League				
Bosnia and Herzegovina	2021–22 Basketball Cup of Bosnia and Herzegovina				
Bulgaria	2022 Bulgarian Women's Basketball Championship				
Bulgaria	2022 Bulgarian Women's Basketball Cup				
Croatia	2021–22 Croatian First Women's Basketball League				
Croatia	2021–22 Ružica Meglaj-Rimac Cup				
Cyprus	2021–22 Cyprus Women's Basketball Division A				
Czech Republic	2021–22 Czech Women's Basketball League				
Denmark	2022 Dameligaen				
Denmark	2021–22 Danish Women's Basketball Cup				
Estonia	2021–22 Women's Korvpalli Meistriliiga				
Finland	2021–22 Naisten Korisliiga				
France	2021–22 Ligue Féminine de Basketball				
Germany	2021–22 Damen-Basketball-Bundesliga				
Germany	2021–22 German Women's Basketball Cup				
United Kingdom	2021–22 WBBL				
United Kingdom	2021–22 WBBL Cup				
Greece	2021–22 Greek Women's Basketball League				
Greece	2021–22 Greek Women's Basketball Cup				
Greece	2021–22 A2 National Women's Basketball				
Hungary	2021–22 Nemzeti Bajnokság I/A	Sopron Basket	Atomerőmű KSC Szekszárd	3–0	Best-of-5 series
Iceland	2021–22 Úrvalsdeild kvenna	Njarðvík	Haukar	3–2	Best-of-5 series
Iceland	2021–22 Icelandic Women's Basketball Cup	Haukar	Breiðablik	88–81	Single-game final
Iceland	2022 Icelandic Women's Basketball Supercup	Njarðvík	Haukar	94–87	Single-game final
Ireland	2021–22 Women's Super League				
Israel	2021–22 Israeli Female Basketball Premier League				
Italy	2021–22 Lega Basket Femminile				
Kosovo	2021–22 ETC Women's Superleague				
Latvia	2022 LSBL Championships				
Lithuania	2021–22 Lithuanian Women's Basketball League				
Luxembourg	2021–22 Nationale 1 Dames				
North Macedonia	2021–22 First Women's Basketball League of Macedonia				
North Macedonia	2021–22 Macedonian Women's Basketball Cup				
Montenegro	2021–22 First A Women's Basketball League of Montenegro				
Montenegro	2021–22 Montenegrin Women's Basketball Cup				
Netherlands	2021–22 Women's Basketball League				
Norway	2021–22 Women's BLNO				
Poland	2021–22 Basket Liga Kobiet				
Portugal	2021–22 Liga Feminina de Basquetebol				
Portugal	2021–22 Portuguese Women's Basketball Cup				
Romania	2021–22 Liga Națională				
Romania	2022 Cupa României				
Russia	2021–22 Russian Women's Basketball Premier League				
Serbia	2021–22 First Women's Basketball League of Serbia	ŽKK Crvena zvezda	ŽKK Art Basket	3–0	Best-of-5 series
Serbia	2021–22 Milan Ciga Vasojević Cup	ŽKK Crvena zvezda	ŽKK Art Basket	90–71	Single-game final
Slovakia	2021–22 Slovak Women's Basketball Extraliga				
Slovenia	2021–22 Slovenian Women's Basketball League				
Slovenia	2021–22 Slovenian Women's Basketball Cup				
Spain	2021–22 Liga Femenina de Baloncesto				
Spain	2022 Copa de la Reina de Baloncesto				
Spain	2022 Supercopa de España de Baloncesto Femenino				
Spain	2021–22 Liga Femenina 2 de Baloncesto				
Sweden	2021–22 Basketligan dam				
Switzerland	2021–22 Swiss Women's Basketball Championship				
Turkey	2021–22 Women's Basketball Super League				
Turkey	2021–22 Turkish Women's Basketball Cup				
Turkey	2022 Turkish Women's Basketball Presidential Cup				
Ukraine	2021–22 Ukrainian Women's Basketball SuperLeague	Abandoned due to the 2022 Russian invasion of Ukraine			

==== Asia ====
Nation	Tournament	Champion	Runner-up	Result	Playoff format
China	2022 WCBA season				
Japan	2021–22 Women's Japan Basketball League				
South Korea	2021–22 Women's Korean Basketball League				
Taiwan	2022 Women's Super Basketball League				

==== Americas ====
Nation	Tournament	Champion	Runner-up	Result	Playoff format
United States	2022 WNBA season	Las Vegas Aces	Connecticut Sun	3–1	Best-of-5 series
United States	2022 WNBA Commissioner's Cup	Las Vegas Aces	Chicago Sky	93–83	Single-game final

==== Oceania ====
Nation	Tournament	Champion	Runner-up	Result	Playoff format
Australia	2021–22 WNBL season	Melbourne Boomers	Perth Lynx	2–1	Best-of-3 series

== College seasons ==
=== Men's ===
Nation	League / Tournament	Champions	Runners-up	Result	Playoff format
Canada	2022 U Sports Men's Basketball Championship	Carleton Ravens	Saskatchewan Huskies	85–72	Single-game final
Philippines	UAAP Season 84	UP Fighting Maroons	Ateneo Blue Eagles	2–1	Best-of-3 series
Philippines	NCAA Season 98	Letran Knights	Benilde Blazers	2–1	Best-of-3 series
Philippines	PCCL National Collegiate Championship	Not held due to COVID-19			
United States	NCAA Division I	Kansas Jayhawks	North Carolina Tar Heels	72–69	Single-game final
United States	National Invitation Tournament	Xavier Musketeers	Texas A&M Aggies	73–72	Single-game final
United States	NCAA Division II	Northwest Missouri State Bearcats	Augusta Jaguars	67–58	Single-game final
United States	NCAA Division III	Randolph–Macon Yellow Jackets	Elmhurst Blue Jays	75–45	Single-game final
United States	NAIA	Loyola Wolf Pack	Talladega Tornadoes	71–56	Single-game final

=== Women's ===
Nation	League / Tournament	Champions	Runners-up	Result	Playoff format
Canada	2022 U Sports Women's Basketball Championship	Ryerson Rams	Winnipeg Wesmen	70–48	Single-game final
Philippines	UAAP Season 84	Not held due to COVID-19			
United States	NCAA Division I	South Carolina Gamecocks	UConn Huskies	64–49	Single-game final
United States	Women's National Invitation Tournament	South Dakota State Jackrabbits	Seton Hall Pirates	82–50	Single-game final
United States	NCAA Division II	Glenville State Pioneers	Western Washington Vikings	85–72	Single-game final
United States	NCAA Division III	Hope Flying Dutch	Wisconsin–Whitewater Warhawks	71–58	Single-game final
United States	NAIA	Thomas More Saints	Dordt Defenders	77–65	Single-game final

== Deaths ==
- January 15 — Joe B. Hall, 93, American college coach (Kentucky, Regis, Central Missouri). National championship in 1978.
- January 18 — Lorenzo Alocén, 84, Spanish Olympic player (1968).
- January 18 — Lusia Harris, 66, American Hall of Fame college (Delta State) and professional (Houston Angels) player, Olympic silver medalist (1976).
- January 19 — Leland Byrd, 94, All-American player (West Virginia) and college coach (Glenville State).
- January 21 — James Forbes, 69, American Olympic silver medalist (1972).
- January 21 — Axel Nikulásson, 59, Icelandic player (Keflavík, Grindavík, KR) and coach.
- January 26 — Juan Báez, 86, Puerto Rican Olympic player (1960, 1964).
- February 1 — Stanisław Olejniczak, 83, Polish Olympic player (1964).
- February 2 — Bill Fitch, 89, American Hall of Fame NBA (Cleveland Cavaliers, Boston Celtics, Houston Rockets, New Jersey Nets, Los Angeles Clippers) and college (North Dakota, Bowling Green, Minnesota) coach.
- February 8 — Bill Lienhard, 92, American college player (Kansas) and Olympic gold medalist (1952). NCAA champion (1952).
- February 8 — Jackie Robinson, 94, American Olympic gold medalist (1948).
- February 14 — Kenny Ejim, 27, Canadian player (Zornotza, Saskatchewan Rattlers, Hamilton Honey Badgers).
- February 16 — Andrey Lopatov, 64, Russian Olympic bronze medalist (1980).
- February 25 — Dick Versace, 81, American college (Bradley) and NBA (Indiana Pacers) coach, executive (Memphis Grizzlies).
- March 3 — Rich Yonakor, 63, American NBA player (San Antonio Spurs).
- March 16 — Dick Knostman, 90, American NBA player (Syracuse Nationals) and college All-American (Kansas State).
- March 16 — Kendall Rhine, 79, American ABA player (Kentucky Colonels, Houston Mavericks).
- March 18 — Tom Barrise, 68, American NBA coach (New Jersey Nets).
- March 18 — Bob Daniels, 86, American college coach (Kentucky Wesleyan).
- March 20 — Tom Young, 89, American college coach (Rutgers, Catholic University, Old Dominion).
- March 22 — Elnardo Webster, 74, American ABA player (New York Nets, Memphis Pros).
- March 24 — Kenny McFadden, 61, New Zealand player and coach (Wellington Saints).
- March 26 — Joe Williams, 88, American college coach (Florida State, Furman, Jacksonville).
- March 30 — Urbano Zea, 80, Mexican Olympic player (1960).
- April 3 — Gene Shue, 90, American NBA player (Philadelphia Warriors, New York Knicks, Detroit Pistons, Baltimore Bullets) and coach (Washington Bullets, Philadelphia 76ers, San Diego Clippers).
- April 4 — Petar Skansi, 78, Croatian player (Jugoplastika, Yugoslavia national team) and coach (Benetton Treviso), Olympic silver medalist (1968).
- April 5 — Lee Rose, 85, American college coach (UNC Charlotte, Purdue, South Florida).
- April 6 — Abraham Sie, 22, Ivorian player (ABC Fighters, DUC Dakar, national team).
- April 9 — Inga Freidenfelds, 86, Australian Olympic player (1956).
- April 10 — John Drew, 67, American NBA player (Atlanta Hawks, Utah Jazz).
- April 11 — Wayne Cooper, 65, American NBA player (Golden State Warriors, Utah Jazz, Dallas Mavericks, Portland Trail Blazers, Denver Nuggets).
- April 16 — Mariano Ortiz, 77, Puerto Rican Olympic player (1968, 1972, 1976).
- April 19 — Freeman Williams, 65, American NBA player (San Diego Clippers, Atlanta Hawks, Utah Jazz, Washington Bullets).
- April 25 — Mike Preaseau, 86, American college player and NCAA champion (San Francisco).
- April 28 — Zoran Sretenović, 57, Serbian player (Crvena zvezda, Jugoplastika) and coach (Železničar Inđija), European champion (1991, 1995).
- May 2 — Nield Gordon, 91, American college coach (Winthrop).
- May 6 — Ralph Polson, 92, American NBA player (New York Knicks, Philadelphia Warriors).
- May 9 — Tadeusz Grygiel, 68, Polish player (Śląsk Wrocław).
- May 9 — Adreian Payne, 31, American NBA player (Atlanta Hawks, Minnesota Timberwolves, Orlando Magic).
- May 10 — Walter Hirsch, 92, American college player (Kentucky).
- May 10 — Bob Lanier, 73, American Hall of Fame NBA player (Detroit Pistons, Milwaukee Bucks) and coach (Golden State Warriors).
- May 11 — Claude Peter, 74, French player (Le Mans Sarthe Basket, national team).
- May 12 — Larry Holley, 76, American college coach (William Jewell, Central Methodist, Northwest Missouri State).
- May 16 — Algis Ignatavicius, 89, Australian Olympic player (1956).
- May 17 — Ademola Okulaja, 46, Nigerian-German player (Alba Berlin, FC Barcelona, Brose Baskets).
- May 18 — Sam Smith, 79, American ABA player (Minnesota Muskies, Kentucky Colonels, Utah Stars).
- May 21 — Jiří Zídek Sr., 78, Czech Olympic player (1972) and coach.
- May 27 — Don Goldstein, 84, American college player (Louisville).
- June 4 — Nate Miller, 34, American player (Ironi Nahariya, Ironi Ramat Gan, Incheon ET Land Elephants).
- June 6 — Yves-Marie Vérove, 72, French player (AS Berck, Caen, Étendard de Brest) and coach.
- June 8 — George Thompson, 74, American ABA (Pittsburgh Pipers, Memphis Tams) and NBA (Milwaukee Bucks) player.
- June 16 — Mike Pratt, 73, American ABA player (Kentucky Colonels), college coach (UNC Charlotte) and announcer (Kentucky).
- June 17 — Paul Ruffner, 73, American NBA (Chicago Bulls, Buffalo Braves) and ABA (Pittsburgh Condors, Spirits of St. Louis) player.
- June 18 — Lennie Rosenbluth, 89, American NBA player (Philadelphia Warriors) and college All-American (North Carolina). NCAA champion (1957).
- June 20 — Caleb Swanigan, 25, American NBA player (Portland Trail Blazers, Sacramento Kings) and college All-American (Purdue).
- June 28 — Mike Schuler, 81, American NBA coach (Portland Trail Blazers, Los Angeles Clippers).
- July 1 — Joe Hatton, 74, Puerto Rican Olympic player (1968, 1972).
- July 4 — Miguel González, 83, Spanish Olympic player (1960).
- July 7 — Pedro Ferrándiz, 93, Spanish Hall of Fame coach (Real Madrid, national team).
- July 8 — Hugh Evans, 81, American Hall of Fame NBA referee.
- July 9 — Bernard Toone, 65, American NBA player (Philadelphia 76ers).
- July 10 — Juan Roca Brunet, 71, Cuban Olympic bronze medalist (1972).
- July 21 — Johnny Egan, 83, American NBA player (Detroit Pistons, New York Knicks, Baltimore Bullets, Los Angeles Lakers, Cleveland Cavaliers, San Diego Rockets) and coach (Houston Rockets).
- July 28 — Franco Casalini, 70, Italian coach (Olimpia Milano).
- July 31 — Bill Russell, 88, American Hall of Fame NBA player (Boston Celtics) and coach (Boston Celtics, Seattle SuperSonics, Sacramento Kings), Olympic gold medalist (1956). 11-time NBA champion.
- August 1 — Carlos Blixen, 85, Uruguayan Olympic bronze medallist (1956).
- August 6 — Steve Courtin, 79, American NBA player (Philadelphia 76ers).
- August 6 — Gene Visscher, 81, American college coach (Weber State, Northern Arizona).
- August 12 — Togo Palazzi, 90, American NBA player (Boston Celtics, Syracuse Nationals) and college coach (Holy Cross).
- August 15 — Pete Carril, 92, American Hall of Fame college coach (Reading HS, Lehigh, Princeton).
- August 16 — Wayne Yates, 84, American NBA player (Los Angeles Lakers) and college coach (Memphis State).
- August 18 — István Liptay, 87, Hungarian Olympic player (1960).
- August 25 — Radovan Radović, 86, Serbian player (BSK, Kartizan) and coach, Olympian (1960).
- August 26 — Charlie Brown, 86, American college player (Seattle University).
- August 29 — Pat McGeer, 95, Canadian Olympic player (1948).
- August 31 — Ed Gregory, 91, American college (Fresno State) and NBA (Golden State Warriors) coach.
- September 4 — Saint-Ange Vebobe, 69, French player (JA Vichy, Antibes, national team).
- September 12 — Harry Booth, 81, American college coach (St Joseph's).
- September 22 — Greg Lee, 70, American ABA (San Diego Conquistadors) and NBA (Portland Trail Blazers) player.
- September 23 — Celso Scarpini, 77, Brazilian Olympic player (1968).
- September 28 — Julio Osorio, 82, Panamanian Olympic player (1968).
- October 2 — Chris Harris, 89, British-American NBA player (St. Louis Hawks, Rochester Royals).
- October 3 — Ron Franz, 76, American ABA player (Oakland Oaks, New Orleans Buccaneers, The Floridians, Memphis Tams, Dallas Chaparrals).
- October 3 — Tiffany Jackson, 37, American WNBA player (New York Liberty, Tulsa Shock, Los Angeles Sparks) and coach.
- October 8 — Julian Hammond, 79, American ABA player (Denver Rockets).
- October 10 — Joe Roberts, 86, American NBA (Syracuse Nationals) and ABA (Kentucky Colonels) player and coach.
- October 12 — Lucious Jackson, 80, American NBA player (Philadelphia 76ers) and Olympic gold medalist (1964).
- October 13 — Rollie Seltz, 98, American NBA player (Anderson Packers).
- October 14 — Stanislav Kropilák, 67, Slovak FIBA Hall of Fame player (Inter Bratislava, BK Pardubice, CEP Fleurus).
- October 21 — Jim Bolla, 70, American college coach (UNLV, Hawaii).
- October 24 — Anatoly Zourpenko, 46, Greek-Russian player (Olympiacos, Papagou, Panellinios).
- November 2 — Ron Watts, 79, American NBA player (Boston Celtics).
- November 6 — Pilar Valero, 52, Spanish player (Ros Casares Godella, national team).
- November 9 — Fred Hickman, 66, American NBA broadcaster and studio host.
- November 15 — Gulam Abbas Moontasir, 80, Indian player (Bombay University, national team).
- November 16 — Mike Macaluso, 71, American NBA player (Buffalo Braves).
- November 16 — Les Wothke, 83, American college coach (Winona State, Western Michigan, Army)
- November 22 — John Y. Brown Jr., 88, American ABA (Kentucky Colonels) and NBA (Buffalo Braves, Boston Celtics) owner.
- November 23 — John Beasley, 78, American ABA player (Dallas Chaparrals, Utah Stars).
- November 26 — Charles Wolf, 96, American NBA coach (Cincinnati Royals, Detroit Pistons).
- November 27 — Murray Waxman, 97, Canadian Olympic player (1948).
- November 29 — Jeff Moore, 56, American college player (Auburn).
- December 3 — Alzhan Zharmukhamedov, 78, Kazakh player (CSKA Moscow, Soviet Union national team) and coach, Olympic gold medalist (1972).
- December 6 — Worthy Patterson, 91, American NBA player (St. Louis Hawks).
- December 10 — Paul Silas, 79, American NBA player (St. Louis Hawks, Phoenix Suns, Boston Celtics, Denver Nuggets, Seattle SuperSonics) and coach (San Diego Clippers, Charlotte Hornets, New Orleans Hornets, Cleveland Cavaliers).
- December 11 — Ed Goorjian, 96, American college coach (Loyola Marymount).
- December 14 — Billie Moore, 79, American Hall of Fame college basketball coach (Cal State Fullerton, UCLA), Olympic silver medalist (1976).
- December 15 — Louis Orr, 64, American NBA player (Indiana Pacers, New York Knicks) and college coach (Siena, Seton Hall, Bowling Green).
- December 19 — Encarna Hernández, 105, Spanish player and coach.
- December 19 — Al Smith, 75, American ABA player (Denver Rockets, Utah Stars).
- December 23 — Willie Sims, 64, American-Israeli player (Hapoel Tel Aviv, Elitzur Netanya, Maccabi Tel Aviv).
- December 23 — Mark Warkentien, 69, American college coach and NBA executive (Denver Nuggets).
- December 24 — Kenton Edelin, 60, American NBA player (Indiana Pacers).
- December 24 — Andrzej Pstrokoński, 86, Polish Olympic player (1960, 1964).
- December 25 — Ken Sidwell, 86, American college coach (Tennessee Tech).
- December 27 — Arnie Ferrin, 97, American BAA and NBA player (Minneapolis Lakers) and college All-American (Utah).
