= Urbano Zea =

- Urbano Zea (basketball)
- Urbano Zea (swimmer)
