= Scarpini =

Scarpini is a surname. Notable people with the surname include:

- Celso Scarpini (1944–2022), Brazilian basketball player
- Pietro Scarpini (1911–1997), Italian pianist
