= Filip Petrušev =

Serbian basketball player (born 2000)

Filip Petrušev Филип Петрушев
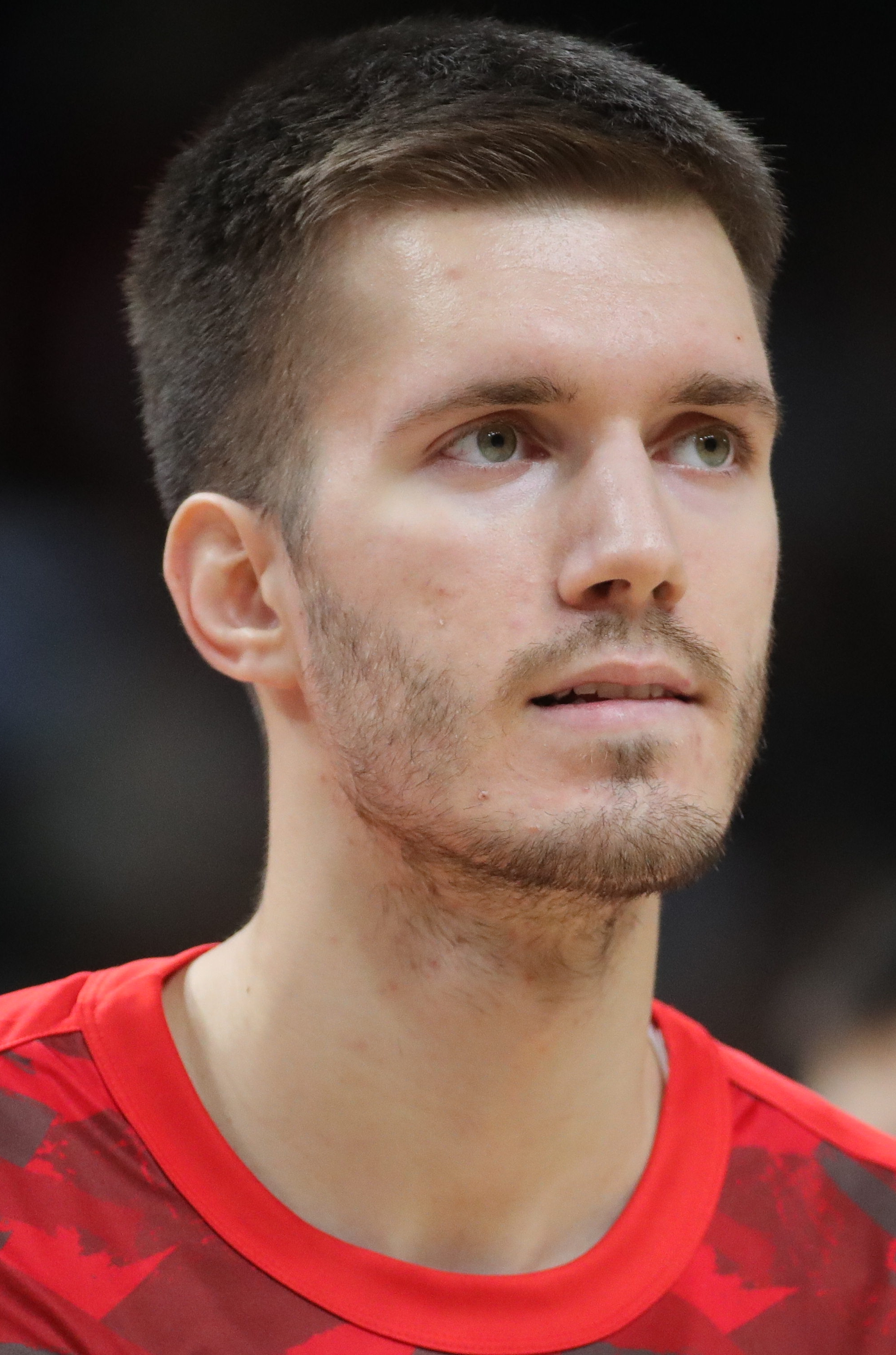
- Petrušev with Crvena zvezda in 2022

No. 30 – Dubai Basketball
- Position: Power forward / center
- League: ABA League; EuroLeague

Personal information
- Born: April 15, 2000 (age 26) Belgrade, Serbia, FR Yugoslavia
- Listed height: 6 ft 11 in (2.11 m)
- Listed weight: 234 lb (106 kg)

Career information
- High school: Avon Old Farms (Avon, Connecticut); Montverde Academy (Montverde, Florida)
- College: Gonzaga (2018–2020)
- NBA draft: 2021: 2nd round, 50th overall pick
- Drafted by: Philadelphia 76ers
- Playing career: 2020–present

Career history
- 2020–2021: Mega Basket
- 2021–2022: Anadolu Efes
- 2022–2023: Crvena zvezda
- 2023: Philadelphia 76ers
- 2023: Sacramento Kings
- 2023: →Stockton Kings
- 2023–2025: Olympiacos
- 2024–2025: →Crvena zvezda
- 2025–present: Dubai Basketball

Career highlights
- EuroLeague champion (2022); ABA League champion (2026); Serbian league champion (2023); Greek Cup winner (2024); 2× Serbian Cup winner (2023, 2025); Greek Supercup winner (2024); ABA League MVP (2021); 2× All-ABA League Team (2021, 2025); All-Serbian League Team (2021); ABA League Top Scorer (2021); ABA League Top Prospect (2021); Serbian Cup MVP (2025); Second-team All-American – NABC (2020); Third-team All-American – AP, SN, USBWA (2020); WCC Player of the Year (2020); First-team All-WCC (2020); WCC All-Freshman Team (2019)
- Stats at NBA.com
- Stats at Basketball Reference
Medals
Men's basketball
Representing Serbia
Olympic Games
Bronze medal – third place	2024 Paris	Team
FIBA World Cup
Silver medal – second place	2023 Philippines–Japan–Indonesia	Team
FIBA U18 EuroBasket
Gold medal – first place	2017 Slovakia	Team
Gold medal – first place	2018 Latvia	Team

Filip Petrušev (Serbian Cyrillic: Филип Петрушев, born April 15, 2000) is a Serbian professional basketball player for Dubai Basketball of the ABA League and the EuroLeague. He played college basketball for the Gonzaga Bulldogs.

== Early career ==
Petrušev was born in Belgrade, Serbia, FR Yugoslavia.

=== Youth basketball in Serbia ===
He started to play basketball for youth systems of Serbian powerhouses Crvena zvezda and Partizan.

=== Saski Baskonia youth system ===
In 2014, Petrušev, already over 2.00 meters in height, who had just completed the seventh grade of primary school in Serbia, signed for the youth system of Spanish club Saski Baskonia (Laboral Kutxa). Moving away from home to Vitoria-Gasteiz in the Basque Country, the fourteen-year-old began living a structured life within the club's youth system: residing with other youth team foreign players in a club-provided house with a cook, attending school classes in the morning, and participating in basketball training sessions in the afternoon. In accordance with the club's training methods, in addition to team practices, he spent a lot of time on daily individual work—honing footwork in the post and practicing the hook shot—with coach Iñaki Iriarte.

In summer 2015, the youngster was picked by coach Vladimir Đokić for the Serbia under-16 national team ahead of the 2015 FIBA Europe Under-16 Championship in Kaunas.

As per the advice and wishes of his family, he decided to leave Saski Baskonia during summer 2016 at age sixteen once the club wanted him to turn professional, which was to entail stopping his formal education, devoting his time fully to basketball, and likely being sent out on loans to smaller Spanish clubs in pursuit of making the full squad at Baskonia. Summarizing his two-year stay in Spain, Petrušev described it as "essentially becoming a semi-professional at fourteen" while crediting it for "significant personal growth".

Not keen on stopping his secondary education as part of turning professional, Petrušev began looking for a way to continue his schooling while simultaneously pursuing basketball.

=== U.S. high schools ===
After making the Serbia under-16 national team for the 2016 U16 European Championship where he appeared alongside youth prospects Alen Smailagić, Dalibor Ilić, and Marko Pecarski, sixteen-year-old Petrušev began playing high school basketball in the United States with Avon Old Farms, an all-boys boarding school in Avon, Connecticut. Arriving in Connecticut with a foot injury he had picked up at the European under-16 Championship, Petrušev missed the majority of the season, watching the games from the bench and reportedly being disappointed with the style of basketball played at Avon, specifically its run-and-gun nature and disorganized structure. Once he finally got on the court, though, he quickly adapted to the different style of play, eventually growing to appreciate its faster pace, focus on athleticism as well as being able to stretch the floor, shoot the three, and have the ball in his hands more, none of which he had been exposed to at Baskonia or Serbia under-16 national team.

In July 2017, ahead of his senior season, Petrušev transferred to Montverde Academy in Montverde, Florida, an elite professional sports private prep school that a number of NBA players had come through.

In August 2017, he attended the Basketball Without Borders Europe Camp 16 in Netanya, Israel. Playing on a roster led by the number 1 prospect in the country RJ Barrett as well as top recruits Andrew Nembhard and Michael Devoe, Petrušev immediately gained the trust of the team's head coach Kevin Boyle who envisioned the 6-foot-11-inch (2.11 m) Serbian as a modern big (power forward or center) who could shoot threes and set himself apart as an inside-outside player. Adjudged to be too thin, the player was simultaneously put through a physical regiment to bulk up. Petrušev attended Basketball Without Borders Global Camp in El Segundo, California in February 2018.

=== U.S. college recruiting ===
Petrušev was a consensus four-star recruit, according to major recruiting services. He originally committed to the University of Hartford on October 24, 2016, but later de-committed on July 26, 2017. On October 22, 2017, he announced his commitment to Gonzaga. On November 8, 2017, Petrušev signed a letter of intent with the Gonzaga Bulldogs.

College recruiting (2018)
Name	Hometown	School	Height	Weight	Commit date
Filip Petrušev; PF	Belgrade, Serbia	Montverde Academy (FL)	6 ft 11 in (2.11 m)	225 lb (102 kg)	Oct 22, 2017
Filip Petrušev; PF	Recruit ratings: Rivals: 247Sports: ESPN: (86)				
Overall recruit ranking: Rivals: 95 247Sports: 73 ESPN: 56
Note: In many cases, Scout, Rivals, 247Sports, On3, and ESPN may conflict in their listings of height and weight.; In these cases, the average was taken. ESPN grades are on a 100-point scale.; Sources: "Gonzaga 2018 Basketball Commitments". Rivals.; "2018 Gonzaga Bulldogs Recruiting Class". ESPN.; "2018 Team Ranking". Rivals.

== College career ==
As a freshman, Petrušev averaged 6.5 points and 2.7 rebounds per game and was named to the West Coast Conference (WCC) All-Freshman Team. He scored a career-high 25 points in a 110–60 win over Arkansas–Pine Bluff on November 9, 2019. On December 21, Petrušev had 24 points and nine rebounds in a 112–77 win over Eastern Washington. He was named to the midseason watchlist for the Wooden Award. Petrušev went down with an ankle injury in the second half of a game against BYU on January 18, 2020. At the conclusion of the regular season, Petrušev was named WCC player of the year. He averaged 17.5 points and eight rebounds per game. Following the season Petrušev declared for the 2020 NBA draft. Later, he withdrew his name from consideration for the 2020 NBA draft.

== Professional career ==
=== Mega Basket (2020–2021) ===
On July 20, 2020, Petrušev signed his first professional contract with Mega Soccerbet of the Basketball League of Serbia. "There's a lot of uncertainty with the NCAA season," he said. "Here I should be able to showcase some skills I wasn't able to at Gonzaga and improve my draft stock." He was named the ABA League October MVP. On November 8, Petrušev withdrew from the 2020 NBA draft. He won the ABA League MVP, ABA League Top Prospect, and ABA League Top Scorer awards for the 2020–21 season.

=== Anadolu Efes (2021–2022) ===
In August 2021, having been drafted by the team earlier in the summer, Petrušev joined the Philadelphia 76ers for the NBA Summer League. On August 9, 2021, he made his debut in the Summer League in a 95–73 win against the Dallas Mavericks in which he posted 5 points, 4 rebounds, and 3 blocks in 19 minutes.

On August 17, 2021, Petrušev signed a one-year contract with reigning EuroLeague champions Anadolu Efes of the Turkish Super League.

Joining the accomplished squad led by a duo of guards Shane Larkin and Petrušev's Serbian compatriot Vasilije Micić, Petrušev started out well in the EuroLeague opening game loss away at Real Madrid, his EuroLeague debut, with 17 points in 16 minutes of action on 6 of 8 field goal shooting. He had a few more solid outings during the first half of the season that saw the defending champions Efes struggle with a 0–4 start before finally recording a win in week 5 at home to the Russian club UNICS. The team's struggles continued the rest of fall 2021 with a disappointing 9–9 record at the end of December 2021 just past the halfway point of the regular season.

Petrušev's role diminished in the second half of the EuroLeague regular season as Efes' veteran centers Tibor Pleiß and Bryant Dunston rolled into form and head coach Ergin Ataman generally began relying more on the veterans that carried Efes the season before. After not getting a single minute of action in the playoffs quarterfinal best-of-five series versus Olimpia Milano, Petrušev also had no playing time at the Final Four in Belgrade as Efes successfully defended their EuroLeague title.

=== Crvena zvezda (2022–2023) ===
After answering the Serbian national team call-up for two qualification games as part of the team's World Cup third qualification window in late June and early July 2022 (and appearing only in the first game away at Latvia with no points and 10 rebounds), Petrušev joined the Philadelphia 76ers in its Summer League participation in Las Vegas for the second year running later that month. Expressing desire to join the Sixers right away, he appeared in 4 Summer League games for the team, averaging 5.5 points and 2.3 rebounds. He was not signed by the Sixers as he was deemed to still not be physically ready for the NBA.

On July 19, 2022, Petrušev signed a contract with his hometown club Crvena zvezda. The move meant a return to Crvena zvezda for Petrušev as he had played within the club's youth system prior to 2014. In 34 EuroLeague games, he averaged 10.7 points and 5.2 rebounds in 23 minutes per contest.

=== Philadelphia 76ers (2023) ===
On May 3, 2021, Petrušev declared for the 2021 NBA draft. Petrušev was selected with the 50th overall pick by the Philadelphia 76ers in the 2021 NBA Draft. Following the draft, Petrušev remained in Europe.

On July 17, 2023, Petrušev signed with the Philadelphia 76ers.

Petrušev made not only his NBA debut, but also played in what became his only game with the 76ers on October 29, 2023, grabbing only one rebound in two minutes and 41 seconds of action that resulted in a 126–98 blowout win over the Portland Trail Blazers.

=== Sacramento Kings (2023) ===
On 1 November 2023, the Los Angeles Clippers acquired Petrušev, James Harden, and P.J. Tucker from the 76ers in exchange for Marcus Morris, Nicolas Batum, Kenyon Martin Jr. and Robert Covington. The Clippers then traded him to the Sacramento Kings on 3 November for the draft rights of his fellow Serbian and 2022–23 season teammate Luka Mitrović. On 24 November, Petrušev was waived by the Kings.

=== Olympiacos (2023–2025) ===
On 28 November 2023, Petrušev signed a three-year deal with Olympiacos of the Greek Basketball League and the EuroLeague.

==== Loan to Crvena zvezda (2024–2025) ====
On 23 October 2024, Petrušev was loaned back to Crvena zvezda for the rest of the season after the injured Moustapha Fall and Nikola Milutinov returned to the Olympiacos roster.

=== Dubai Basketball (2025–present) ===
On 25 July 2025, Petrušev signed a three-year contract with Dubai Basketball of the ABA League and the EuroLeague.

== National team career ==
=== Youth ===
Petrušev was a member of the Serbian U-16 national team that participated at the 2015 FIBA Europe Under-16 Championship and 2016 FIBA Europe Under-16 Championship.

Petrušev was a member of the Serbian national under-18 basketball teams that won the gold medals at the 2017 Championship and the 2018 FIBA Europe Under-18 Championship. Over seven tournament games in 2017, he averaged 5.3 points and 3.4 rebounds per game. In 2018, he averaged 21.0 points, 8.7 rebounds and 3.1 assists per game over seven tournament games. Petrušev had 29 points, 8 rebounds and 3 assists in the Final. At the tournament's end, he finished third in scoring and rebounds and got selected to the All-Tournament Team.

Petrušev was a member of the Serbian under-19 team that finished 7th at the 2019 FIBA Under-19 Basketball World Cup in Heraklion, Greece. Over seven tournament games, he averaged 19.3 points, 10.1 rebounds, 2.6 assists, 1.6 steals and 2.0 blocks per game.

=== Senior ===
Petrušev was a member of the Serbia national team put together by head coach Igor Kokoškov for the 2020 FIBA Men's Olympic Qualifying Tournament, played in Belgrade, Serbia in late June and early July 2021. His team lost to Italy in the final thus missing the 2020 Summer Olympics. Over four tournament games, he averaged team-high 15.5 points, five rebounds, 0.8 assists, and team-high one block per game.

Petrušev represented the Serbia men's national basketball team at the 2023 FIBA Basketball World Cup, under manager Svetislav Pešić. Serbia went on to win the silver medal, losing to Germany in the final game. Over 6 games played, he averaged 8.2 points and 3.5 rebounds per game. Petrušev won the bronze medal at the 2024 Summer Olympics with Serbia. Over 6 tournament games, he averaged 9.7 points and 4.5 rebounds.

== Career statistics ==
Legend
GP	Games played	GS	Games started	MPG	Minutes per game
FG%	Field-goal percentage	3P%	3-point field-goal percentage	FT%	Free-throw percentage
RPG	Rebounds per game	APG	Assists per game	SPG	Steals per game
BPG	Blocks per game	PPG	Points per game	PIR	Performance index rating
**Bold**	Career high

=== NBA ===
Year	Team	GP	GS	MPG	FG%	3P%	FT%	RPG	APG	SPG	BPG	PPG
2023–24	Philadelphia	1	0	3.0	—	—	—	**1.0**	.0	.0	.0	.0
2023–24	Sacramento	**2**	0	**3.5**	**.500**	—	**.500**	.0	.0	.0	.0	**1.5**
Career		3	0	3.3	.500	—	.500	.3	.0	.0	.0	1.0

=== EuroLeague ===
†	Denotes seasons in which Petrušev won the EuroLeague

Year	Team	GP	GS	MPG	FG%	3P%	FT%	RPG	APG	SPG	BPG	PPG	PIR
2021–22†	Anadolu Efes	22	4	9.3	**.597**	**.400**	.750	1.6	.3	.1	.2	5.2	5.2
2022–23	Crvena zvezda	**34**	11	**22.6**	.542	.351	.695	**5.2**	.7	.5	**.7**	10.7	12.6
2023–24	Olympiacos	22	1	15.6	.476	.286	**.783**	3.3	.6	.3	.5	6.3	7.8
2024–25	Crvena zvezda	28	**12**	21.4	.566	.283	.671	4.9	**1.7**	**.8**	.6	**14.1**	**15.3**
Career		110	28	17.5	.542	.313	.709	4.0	.9	.4	.5	9.5	11.0

=== Domestic leagues ===
Year	Team	League	GP	MPG	FG%	3P%	FT%	RPG	APG	SPG	BPG	PPG
2020–21	(Serbia) Mega	KLS	8	25.9	.483	.542	.617	6.9	1.5	.4	.7	15.7
2020–21	(Serbia) Mega	ABA	21	32.0	.579	.419	.739	7.6	1.6	.5	1.1	23.6
2021–22	(Turkey) Anadolu Efes	TBSL	13	22.7	.678	.167	.842	6.1	1.0	.2	1.2	15.1
2022–23	(Serbia) Crvena zvezda	KLS	2	16.5	.750	1.000	.500	3.0	2.0	.5	1.0	7.0
2022–23	(Serbia) Crvena zvezda	ABA	33	22.4	.597	.519	.725	4.8	1.6	.4	.7	11.4
2023–24	(United States) Stockton Kings	G League	1	9.0	—	—	—	1.0	1.0	—	1.0	0.0
2023–24	(Greece) Olympiacos	HEBA A1	19	16.3	.611	.200	.707	3.7	1.5	.2	.3	7.8
2024–25	(Serbia) Crvena zvezda	KLS	2	27.5	.450	—	.667	6.0	1.5	2.0	.2	12.0
2024–25	(Serbia) Crvena zvezda	ABA	28	21.7	.568	.348	.778	5.0	1.8	.6	.6	13.6

=== College ===
Year	Team	GP	GS	MPG	FG%	3P%	FT%	RPG	APG	SPG	BPG	PPG
2018–19	Gonzaga	32	0	11.4	.554	**.300**	**.853**	2.7	.3	.2	.5	6.5
2019–20	Gonzaga	**33**	**33**	**25.9**	**.562**	.182	.655	**7.9**	**1.5**	**.6**	**.8**	**17.5**
Career		65	33	18.8	.560	.268	.703	5.4	.9	.4	.6	12.0

== Personal life ==
Filips daughter Stasia was born this year. They are of Macedonian descent. He has credited his grandfather, Gute Petrušev, who emigrated from Macedonia to Serbia, as a very important person in his success. It was his grandfather who consistently brought young Filip to basketball training and supported him throughout his entire career. He also stated that his grandfather originally bore the surname Petruševski when he moved to Belgrade, but it was later changed to Petrušev.

== See also ==
- List of Serbian NBA players
- List of NBA drafted players from Serbia
- Philadelphia 76ers draft history
