= 2021–22 Fenerbahçe S.K. (basketball) season =

Turkish professional basketball team season

Fenerbahçe Beko
2021–22 season
- President: Ali Koç
- Head coach: Aleksandar Đorđević
- Arena: Ülker Sports and Event Hall
- Basketbol Süper Ligi: 1st seed
- Playoffs: Champions
- EuroLeague: 12th seed
- Turkish Basketball Cup: Runners-up
- PIR leader: (Czech Republic) Veselý 17.1
- Scoring leader: (France) de Colo 15.1
- Rebounding leader: (Czech Republic) Veselý 6.2
- Assists leader: (Senegal) Henry 5.9
Home	Away

The 2021–22 season was Fenerbahçe's 108th season in the existence of the club. The team played in the Basketball Super League and in the EuroLeague.

== Players ==
=== Squad information ===
Note: Flags indicate national team eligibility at FIBA-sanctioned events. Players may hold other non-FIBA nationalities not displayed.

Fenerbahçe Beko roster
Players
Coaches

Pos.	No.	Nat.	Name	Ht.	Wt.	Age
F	1	(Turkey)	Birsen, Metecan	2.08 m (6 ft 10 in)	101 kg (223 lb)	27 – 6 April 1995
G	2	(Turkey)	Hazer, Şehmus	1.90 m (6 ft 3 in)	90 kg (198 lb)	23 – 15 February 1999
PG	5	(Germany) (Turkey)	Akpınar, İsmet	1.91 m (6 ft 3 in)	77 kg (170 lb)	27 – 22 May 1995
SG	10	(Turkey)	Mahmutoğlu, Melih (C)	1.91 m (6 ft 3 in)	85 kg (187 lb)	32 – 12 May 1990
PG	11	(United States)	Starks, Markel	1.86 m (6 ft 1 in)	79 kg (174 lb)	31 – 21 February 1991
F	13	(Turkey) (Bosnia and Herzegovina)	Biberovic, Tarık	2.01 m (6 ft 7 in)	100 kg (220 lb)	21 – 28 January 2001
SG	19	(France)	de Colo, Nando	1.96 m (6 ft 5 in)	91 kg (201 lb)	34 – 23 June 1987
G	20	(United States) (Senegal)	Henry, Pierriá	1.96 m (6 ft 5 in)	89 kg (196 lb)	29 – 20 January 1993
F	21	(Canada)	Pierre, Dyshawn	1.98 m (6 ft 6 in)	104 kg (229 lb)	28 – 17 November 1993
F	22	(Germany)	Barthel, Danilo	2.08 m (6 ft 10 in)	100 kg (220 lb)	30 – 24 October 1991
SG	23	(Serbia)	Gudurić, Marko	1.98 m (6 ft 6 in)	91 kg (201 lb)	27 – 8 March 1995
F/C	24	(Czech Republic)	Veselý, Jan	2.13 m (7 ft 0 in)	110 kg (243 lb)	32 – 24 April 1990
F	25	(United States)	Floyd, Jehyve	2.03 m (6 ft 8 in)	103 kg (227 lb)	24 – 27 June 1997
F/C	31	(United States)	Booker, Devin	2.06 m (6 ft 9 in)	113 kg (249 lb)	31 – 28 February 1991
SF	33	(Italy)	Polonara, Achille	2.05 m (6 ft 9 in)	90 kg (198 lb)	30 – 23 November 1991
C	44	(Jordan) (Turkey)	Düverioğlu, Ahmet	2.10 m (6 ft 11 in)	121 kg (267 lb)	29 – 4 March 1993

Head coach

- (Serbia) Aleksandar Đorđević

Assistant coach(es)

- (Croatia) Goran Bjedov
- (Slovenia) Rado Trifunović
- (Turkey) Serhan Aydanarığ
- (Turkey) Berkay Oğuz
- (Turkey) Alp Timuçin Yeter

Athletic trainer(s)

- (Turkey) İlker Belgutay
- (Serbia) Mladen Mihajlović

Physiotherapist(s)

- (Turkey) Rıza Özdemir
- (Turkey) Berkay Güzel

Team manager

- (Turkey) Cenk Renda

Legend

- (C) Team captain
- (DC) Dual citizenship
- Injured

- Roster
Updated: April 15, 2022

=== Depth chart ===
Pos.	Starting 5	Bench 1	Bench 2	Bench 3
C	Jan Veselý	Jehyve Floyd	Ahmet Düverioğlu
PF	Devin Booker	Achille Polonara	Danilo Barthel
SF	Dyshawn Pierre	Tarik Biberovic	Metecan Birsen
SG	Marko Gudurić	Şehmus Hazer	Melih Mahmutoğlu
PG	Nando de Colo	Pierriá Henry	İsmet Akpınar	Markel Starks

=== Transactions ===
==== In ====
No.	Pos.	Nat.	Name	Age	Moving from		Ends	Date	Source
31	F/C	(United States)	Devin Booker	30	Khimki	(Russia)	June 2023	16 June 2021	
5	PG	(Germany)	İsmet Akpınar	26	Bahçeşehir	(Turkey)	June 2023	18 June 2021	
3	SG	(Canada)	Marial Shayok	25	Bursaspor	(Turkey)	June 2023	21 June 2021	
20	PG	(Senegal)	Pierriá Henry	28	Saski Baskonia	(Spain)	June 2023	24 June 2021	
33	F	(Italy)	Achille Polonara	29	Saski Baskonia	(Spain)	June 2023	29 June 2021	
1	F	(Turkey)	Metecan Birsen	26	Pınar Karşıyaka	(Turkey)	June 2023	29 June 2021	
2	SG	(Turkey)	Şehmus Hazer	22	Beşiktaş Icrypex	(Turkey)	June 2024	12 September 2021	
25	C	(United States)	Jehyve Floyd	24	Panathinaikos	(Greece)	June 2022	21 December 2021	
11	PG	(United States)	Markel Starks	30	Igokea	(Bosnia and Herzegovina)	June 2022	23 January 2022	

==== Out ====
No.	Pos.	Nat.	Name	Age	Moving to		Date	Source
92	SF	(Lithuania)	Edgaras Ulanovas	29	Žalgiris Kaunas	(Lithuania)	15 June 2021	
2	C	(Trinidad and Tobago)	Johnny Hamilton	27	Atlanta Hawks	(United States)	17 June 2021	
4	G	(United States)	Lorenzo Brown	30	UNICS Kazan	(Russia)	17 June 2021	
5	PG	(Mexico)	Alex Pérez	28	Türk Telekom	(Turkey)	4 July 2021	
11	F/C	(United States)	Kyle O'Quinn	31	Paris Basketball	(France)	2 September 2021	
25	PG	(Turkey)	Kenan Sipahi	26	Casademont Zaragoza	(Spain)	15 September 2021	
32	PF	(Turkey)	Berkay Candan	28	Bahçeşehir Koleji	(Turkey)	7 September 2021	
31	SF	(United States)	Jarell Eddie	29	SIG Strasbourg	(France)	30 June 2021	
17	F	(Turkey)	Yiğit Onan	19	KK Dynamic	(Serbia)	17 August 2021	
35	G	(Turkey)	Bobby Dixon	38	Retired		14 September 2021	
3	G/F	(Canada)	Marial Shayok	26	Free agent		15 April 2022	

==== Out on loan ====
No.	Pos.	Nat.	Name	Age	Moving to	Date	Source

== Pre-season and friendlies ==
=== Friendly match ===
11 September 2021 Istanball Cup 1	Fenerbahçe Beko (Turkey)	81–79	(Russia) UNICS	Istanbul
20:15 (UTC+3)	Scoring by quarter: 22–25, 17–16, 20–20, 22–18
	Pts: de Colo 23; Rebs: Booker, de Colo 6 Asts: Henry 6 PIR: de Colo 24	Boxscore	Pts: Brown 21; Rebs: Jekiri 5 Asts: Brown 5 PIR: Spissu 19	Arena: Ülker Sports and Event Hall; Attendance: 5,000 (Tentative); Referees: Ilija Belošević (SRB), Vasiliki Tsaroucha (GRE), Gentian Cici (ALB)

12 September 2021 Istanball Cup 2	Fenerbahçe Beko (Turkey)	89–62	(Serbia) Partizan	Istanbul
20:00 (UTC+3)	Scoring by quarter: 22–10, 25–23, 29–15, 13–14
	Pts: Akpınar 16; Rebs: Düverioğlu 10; Asts: Biberović, de Colo 4 PIR: Pierre 16	Boxscore	Pts: LeDay 15; Rebs: Miletić 6 Asts: Zagorac, Madar 4 PIR: LeDay 15	Arena: Ülker Sports and Event Hall; Attendance: 4,000 (Tentative); Referees: Damir Javor (SVN), Gentian Cici (ALB), Sebastian Bittner (GER)

16 September 2021 Cevat Soydaş Tournament 1	Fenerbahçe Beko	83–62	Türk Telekom	Bursa
16:00 (UTC+3)	Scoring by quarter: 16–8, 17–18, 21–24, 29–12
				Arena: Tofaş Nilüfer Sports Hall

17 September 2021 Cevat Soydaş Tournament 2	Fenerbahçe Beko	67–82	Bahçeşehir Koleji	Bursa
16:00 (UTC+3)	Scoring by quarter: 22–16, 13–21, 8–21, 24–24
		Boxscore		Arena: Tofaş Nilüfer Sports Hall

18 September 2021 Cevat Soydaş Tournament 3	Fenerbahçe Beko	75–91	Galatasaray Nef	Bursa
	Scoring by quarter: 19–22, 20–28, 15–19, 21–22
				Arena: Tofaş Nilüfer Sports Hall

== Competitions ==
=== Overview ===
Competition	First match	Last match	Starting round	Final position	Record							
Competition	First match	Last match	Starting round	Final position	Pld	W	D	L	PF	PA	PD	Win %
Basketball Super League	26 September 2021	13 June 2022	Regular season	Winners	40	32	0	8	3,406	2,987	+419	80.00
EuroLeague	1 October 2021	13 April 2022	Regular season	Regular season	28	10	0	18	2,051	2,099	−48	35.71
Turkish Basketball Cup	15 February 2022	20 February 2022	Quarterfinals	Runners-up	3	2	0	1	229	223	+6	66.67
Total					71	44	0	27	5,686	5,309	+377	61.97

Source: Competitions

=== Basketball Super League ===
==== League table ====
Pos	Team	Pld	W	L	PF	PA	PD	Pts	Qualification or relegation
1	Fenerbahçe Beko	30	24	6	2527	2209	+318	54	Advance to playoffs
2	Anadolu Efes	30	23	7	2699	2405	+294	53	Advance to playoffs
3	Galatasaray Nef	30	20	10	2608	2387	+221	50	Advance to playoffs
4	Gaziantep Basketbol	30	19	11	2414	2276	+138	49	Advance to playoffs
5	Darüşşafaka	30	19	11	2372	2218	+154	49	Advance to playoffs

Source: Basketbol Süper Ligi

==== Results summary ====
Overall						Home					Away				
Pld	W	L	PF	PA	PD	W	L	PF	PA	PD	W	L	PF	PA	PD
30	24	6	2527	2209	+318	13	2	1296	1076	+220	11	4	1231	1133	+98

Source: bsl.org.tr

==== Results by round ====
Round	1	2	3	4	5	6	7	8	9	10	11	12	13	14	15	16	17	18	19	20	21	22	23	24	25	26	27	28	29	30
Ground	A	H	A	H	A	H	A	H	A	H	H	A	H	A	H	H	A	H	A	H	A	H	A	H	A	A	H	A	H	A
Result	W	W	W	W	L	W	W	W	W	W	W	W	W	W	W	L	L	W	L	W	W	W	W	W	L	W	L	W	W	W
Position	2	3	2	1	2	2	1	1	1	1	1	1	1	1	1	2	2	1	1	1	1	1	1	1	1	1	1	1	1	1

Source: TBF.org.tr
A = Away; H = Home; W = Win; L = Loss

==== Matches ====
Note: All times are TRT (UTC+3) as listed by the Turkish Basketball Federation.

26 September 2021 1	Darüşşafaka	65–75	Fenerbahçe Beko	Istanbul
20:15	Scoring by quarter: 13–20, 13–20, 18–15, 21–20
	Pts: Caupain 15; Rebs: Olaseni 12; Asts: Caupain 4 PIR: Boothe 18	Boxscore	Pts: Pierre 15; Rebs: Booker 10; Asts: Veselý 6 PIR: Pierre 19	Arena: Ayhan Şahenk Sports Hall; Referees: Emin Moğulkoç, Özlem Yalman, Erhan Gürsel

3 October 2021 2	Fenerbahçe Beko	71–63	Petkim Spor	Istanbul
20:15	Scoring by quarter: 18–17, 14–18, 23–10, 16–18
	Pts: Henry, Polonara 12; Rebs: Polonara 9 Asts: Henry 13; PIR: Henry 23	Boxscore	Pts: three players 14; Rebs: Yıldırım 5 Asts: Browne 6 PIR: Browne 21	Arena: Ülker Sports and Event Hall; Referees: Osman Sinan İşgüder, Hüseyin Çelik, Orhan Çağrı Hekimoğlu

9 October 2021 3	Bahçeşehir Koleji	78–79	Fenerbahçe Beko	Istanbul
15:30	Scoring by quarter: 24–19, 12–19, 18–20, 24–21
	Pts: Smith 19; Rebs: Candan 6 Asts: Hall 7 PIR: Savaş 18	Boxscore	Pts: de Colo 15; Rebs: Veselý 8 Asts: de Colo 6 PIR: Veselý 20	Arena: Ülker Sports and Event Hall; Referees: Aytuğ Ekti, Alper Özgök, Yiğit Gönültaş

18 October 2021 4	Fenerbahçe Beko	90–68	Anadolu Efes	Istanbul
20:15	Scoring by quarter: 24–16, 23–15, 21–14, 22–23
	Pts: Booker 17; Rebs: Düverioğlu 5 Asts: de Colo 9 PIR: Booker, Hazer 16	Boxscore	Pts: Beaubois 17; Rebs: Dunston 11; Asts: Larkin, Tuncer 6 PIR: Beaubois 20	Arena: Ülker Sports and Event Hall; Referees: Mehmet Keseratar, Emin Moğulkoç, Tolga Edis

23 October 2021 5	Frutti Extra Bursaspor	84–73	Fenerbahçe Beko	Bursa
18:00	Scoring by quarter: 23–21, 21–15, 18–16, 22–21
	Pts: Andrews 20; Rebs: Güven 7 Asts: Needham 8 PIR: Andrews 24	Boxscore	Pts: de Colo 18; Rebs: Düverioğlu, Shayok 4 Asts: de Colo 6 PIR: de Colo 24	Arena: Tofaş Nilüfer Sports Hall; Referees: Mehmet Karabilecen, Can Mavisu, Özge Şentürk

31 October 2021 6	Fenerbahçe Beko	102–80	Gaziantep Basketbol	Istanbul
15:30	Scoring by quarter: 21–32, 25–15, 25–19, 31–14
	Pts: Mahmutoğlu 27; Rebs: Birsen 7 Asts: Shayok 5 PIR: Mahmutoğlu 27	Boxscore	Pts: Peterson 22; Rebs: Kaba 13; Asts: Ulusoy 8 PIR: Kaba 28	Arena: Ülker Sports and Event Hall; Referees: Osman Sinan İşgüder, Semih Vural, Musa Kazım Çetin

7 November 2021 7	Semt77 Yalovaspor	60–86	Fenerbahçe Beko	Yalova
18:00	Scoring by quarter: 20–23, 1324, 1618, 1121
	Pts: Conklin 13; Rebs: Karaman 6 Asts: Jones 6 PIR: Conklin 13	Boxscore	Pts: Düverioğlu 14; Rebs: Veselý 10; Asts: De Colo 6 PIR: Düverioğlu, Veselý 19	Arena: 9. Yıl Sports Hall; Referees: Kerem Baki, Mehmet Serdar Ünal, Ali Köseoğlu

14 November 2021 8	Fenerbahçe Beko	85–77	Yukatel Merkezefendi Basket	Istanbul
18:00	Scoring by quarter: 18–21, 24–23, 21–13, 22–20
	Pts: Shayok 18; Rebs: Booker 9 Asts: Booker, Polonara 6 PIR: Booker 22	Boxscore	Pts: Lomažs 21; Rebs: Upson 7 Asts: Lomažs 6 PIR: Lomažs 22	Arena: Ülker Sports and Event Hall; Referees: Erşan Kartal, Mehmet Şahin, Umut Özgün Ergün

21 November 2021 9	Beşiktaş Icrypex	74–82	Fenerbahçe Beko	Istanbul
21:00	Scoring by quarter: 27–21, 14–25, 13–13, 20–23
	Pts: Bone 21; Rebs: Bluiett, Lawson 5 Asts: Bone 5 PIR: Bone 21	Boxscore	Pts: Mahmutoğlu 18; Rebs: Polonara 8 Asts: Henry 4 PIR: Polonara 21	Arena: Akatlar Arena; Referees: Yener Yılmaz, Alper Özgök, Batuhan Söylemezoğlu

30 November 2021 10	Fenerbahçe Beko	91–69	Pınar Karşıyaka	Istanbul
20:00	Scoring by quarter: 29–15, 19–15, 23–19, 20–20
	Pts: Booker 17; Rebs: Polonara 8 Asts: Henry 8 PIR: Polonara 23	Boxscore	Pts: Colson 20; Rebs: Colson 9 Asts: Roll 7 PIR: Tyus 22	Arena: Ülker Sports and Event Hall; Referees: Emin Moğulkoç, Ali Şakacı, Ziya Özorhon

5 December 2021 11	Fenerbahçe Beko	100–51	HDI Sigorta Afyon Belediye	Istanbul
15:30	Scoring by quarter: 29–11, 25–16, 25–15, 21–9
	Pts: Düverioğlu 21; Rebs: Düverioğlu 11; Asts: de Colo 8 PIR: Düverioğlu 28	Boxscore	Pts: Shorter 13; Rebs: Tarolis 6 Asts: Campbell 5 PIR: Tarolis 13	Arena: Ülker Sports and Event Hall; Referees: Altuğ Köselerli, Ahmet Tatlıcı, Özge Şentürk

11 December 2021 12	Galatasaray Nef	76–86	Fenerbahçe Beko	Istanbul
20:15	Scoring by quarter: 20–24, 15–18, 19–13, 22–31
	Pts: Akoon-Purcell, Bost 19; Rebs: Akoon-Purcell 7 Asts: Trimble 4 PIR: Akoon-Purcell 17	Boxscore	Pts: Mahmutoğlu 22; Rebs: Veselý 12; Asts: Henry 6 PIR: Veselý 20	Arena: Sinan Erdem Dome; Referees: Zafer Yılmaz, Özlem Yalman, Kaan Büyükçil

19 December 2021 13	Fenerbahçe Beko	82–72	Tofaş	Istanbul
15:30	Scoring by quarter: 25–16, 19–19, 20–15, 18–23
	Pts: Veselý 15; Rebs: Veselý 10; Asts: Henry 6 PIR: Veselý 28	Boxscore	Pts: Paco Cruz 16; Rebs: Arslan, Tomislav ZubčićZubčić 6 Asts: Uğurlu 6 PIR: Uğurlu 17	Arena: Ülker Sports and Event Hall; Referees: Yener Yılmaz, Fatih Arslanoğlu, Polat Parlak

25 December 2021 14	Türk Telekom	63–72	Fenerbahçe Beko	Ankara
20:15	Scoring by quarter: 8–17, 15–24, 17–15, 23–16
	Pts: Dawkins 19; Rebs: Johnson 8 Asts: Pérez 6 PIR: Dawkins 19	Boxscore	Pts: Polonara 16; Rebs: Pierre 10; Asts: Henry 13; PIR: Pierre 16	Arena: Ankara Arena; Referees: Mehmet Keseratar, Ayşe Nur Yazıcıoğlu, Batuhan Söylemezoğlu

18 January 2022 15	Fenerbahçe Beko	90–65	Büyükçekmece Basketbol	Istanbul
20:00	Scoring by quarter: 30–15, 17–21, 24–17, 19–12
	Pts: Mahmutoğlu 17; Rebs: Düverioğlu 9 Asts: Hazer 7 PIR: Hazer 27	Boxscore	Pts: Kurtuldum 13; Rebs: Bruinsma, Crawford 5 Asts: Crawford 6 PIR: Kurtuldum 17	Arena: Ülker Sports and Event Hall; Referees: Fatih Arslanoğlu, Mehmet Ozan Çakır, Murat Ciner

8 January 2022 16	Fenerbahçe Beko	61–79	Darüşşafaka	Istanbul
20:15	Scoring by quarter: 12–21, 26–16, 10–25, 13–17
	Pts: Pierre 17; Rebs: Pierre 9 Asts: Henry 6 PIR: Pierre 21	Boxscore	Pts: Caupain 15; Rebs: Olaseni 6 Asts: Caupain 7 PIR: Caupain 20	Arena: Ülker Sports and Event Hall; Referees: Yener Yılmaz, Mehmet Serdar Ünal, Duhan Köyiçi

16 January 2022 17	Petkim Spor	95–90(OT)	Fenerbahçe Beko	Aliağa, İzmir
18:00	Scoring by quarter: 21–19, 26–17, 10–21, 25–25, Overtime: 13–8
	Pts: Browne 27; Rebs: Thomas 8 Asts: Armand, Browne 6 PIR: Thomas 30	Boxscore	Pts: Booker, Mahmutoğlu 16; Rebs: Polonara 10; Asts: Gudurić 8 PIR: Gudurić 18	Arena: Enka Sport Hall; Referees: Mehmet Şahin, Serhat Büker, Sinem Tetik

23 January 2022 18	Fenerbahçe Beko	84–73	Bahçeşehir Koleji	Istanbul
20:15	Scoring by quarter: 29–18, 16–15, 22–20, 17–20
	Pts: Booker 15; Rebs: Düverioğlu, Henry 6 Asts: Hazer 5 PIR: Booker 17	Boxscore	Pts: Dekker 18; Rebs: Savaş 6 Asts: Baygül, Smith 5 PIR: Dekker 20	Arena: Ülker Sports and Event Hall; Referees: Altuğ Alper Köselerli, Ayşe Nur Yazıcıoğlu, Umut Özgün Ergün

30 January 2022 19	Anadolu Efes	91–71	Fenerbahçe Beko	Istanbul
18:00	Scoring by quarter: 20–24, 27–17, 19–22, 25–8
	Pts: Micić 26; Rebs: Singleton 9 Asts: Micić 7 PIR: Micić 26	Boxscore	Pts: Henry 24; Rebs: Polonara 6 Asts: Hazer 4 PIR: Henry, Gudurić 20	Arena: Sinan Erdem Dome; Referees: Zafer Yılmaz, Erşan Kartal, Ali Şakacı

6 February 2022 20	Fenerbahçe Beko	99–96	Frutti Extra Bursaspor	Istanbul
15:30	Scoring by quarter: 27–20, 20–28, 26–22, 26–26
	Pts: Akpınar, Booker 19; Rebs: Düverioğlu, Pierre 4 Asts: Pierre 8 PIR: Akpınar 24	Boxscore	Pts: Andrews, Bitim 19; Rebs: Dudzinski 8 Asts: Needham 8 PIR: Needham 22	Arena: Ülker Sports and Event Hall; Referees: Aytuğ Ekti, Hüseyin Çelik, Erhan Gürsel

13 February 2022 21	Gaziantep Basketbol	70–86	Fenerbahçe Beko	Gaziantep
20:15	Scoring by quarter: 17–17, 22–19, 12–28, 19–22
	Pts: Gulley 34; Rebs: Kaba 9 Asts: Ulusoy 6 PIR: Gulley 32	Boxscore	Pts: Mahmutoğlu, Pierre 15; Rebs: Booker 11; Asts: Henry 11; PIR: Pierre 18	Arena: Karataş Şahinbey Sport Hall; Referees: Mehmet Karabilecen, Ahmet Tatlıcı, Burak Yılmaz

6 March 2022 22	Fenerbahçe Beko	89–63	Semt77 Yalovaspor	Istanbul
15:30	Scoring by quarter: 22–11, 24–6, 23–23, 20–23
	Pts: Mahmutoğlu 19; Rebs: Barthel 14; Asts: Starks 5 PIR: Mahmutoğlu 17	Boxscore	Pts: Gallinat 14; Rebs: Lee 6 Asts: Jones 5 PIR: Gallinat 13	Arena: Ülker Sports and Event Hall; Referees: Erşan Kartal, Özlem Yalman, Murat Ciner

11 March 2022 23	Yukatel Merkezefendi Basket	76–82	Fenerbahçe Beko	Denizli
20:00	Scoring by quarter: 19–23, 16–21, 16–28, 25–10
	Pts: German 31; Rebs: German 6 Asts: German 5 PIR: German 25	Boxscore	Pts: de Colo 19; Rebs: Polonara 7 Asts: Gudurić, Polonara 4 PIR: Booker, Mahmutoğlu 17	Arena: Pamukkale University Arena; Referees: Alper Altuğ Köselerli, Ziya Özorhon, Orhan Çağrı Hekimoğlu

19 March 2022 24	Fenerbahçe Beko	90–81	Beşiktaş Icrypex	Istanbul
15:30	Scoring by quarter: 19–19, 32–15, 18–23, 21–24
	Pts: de Colo 24; Rebs: Polonara 9 Asts: Floyd, Polonara 5 PIR: de Colo 22	Boxscore	Pts: Hollis-Jefferson, Sipahi 23; Rebs: Hollis-Jefferson 9 Asts: Sipahi 5 PIR: Haltalı, Sipahi 23	Arena: Ülker Sports and Event Hall; Referees: Mehmet Karabilecen, Can Mavisu, Musa Kazım Çetin

27 March 2022 25	Pınar Karşıyaka	74–72	Fenerbahçe Beko	İzmir
20:15	Scoring by quarter: 14–25, 20–13, 17–13, 23–21
	Pts: M'Baye 24; Rebs: M'Baye 7 Asts: Roll, Taylor 5 PIR: M'Baye 23	Boxscore	Pts: Mahmutoğlu 29; Rebs: Polonara 9 Asts: Henry 9 PIR: Mahmutoğlu 22	Arena: Karşıyaka Arena; Referees: Zafer Yılmaz, Kaan Büyükçil, Serhat Büker

1 April 2022 26	HDI Sigorta Afyon Belediye	61–99	Fenerbahçe Beko	Afyonkarahisar
20:00	Scoring by quarter: 12–22, 17–23, 17–21, 15–33
	Pts: Hamilton 17; Rebs: Hamilton 8 Asts: Hayes 5 PIR: Hayes 14	Boxscore	Pts: Starks 18; Rebs: Booker, Starks 5 Asts: Biberovic 5 PIR: Starks 23	Arena: Prof. Dr. Veysel Eroğlu Sports Hall; Referees: Hüseyin Çelik, Alper Özgök, Murat Ciner

11 April 2022 27	Fenerbahçe Beko	70–76	Galatasaray Nef	Istanbul
20:30	Scoring by quarter: 18–25, 18–13, 20–20, 14–18
	Pts: Akpınar 17; Rebs: Pierre 6 Asts: Henry, Veselý 7 PIR: Veselý 23	Boxscore	Pts: Bost 17; Rebs: Köksal 5 Asts: Bost 9 PIR: Bost 24	Arena: Ülker Sports and Event Hall; Referees: Ali Serkan Emlek, Alper Altuğ Köselerli, Ali Köseoğlu

16 April 2022 28	Tofaş	78–82	Fenerbahçe Beko	Bursa
20:30	Scoring by quarter: 26–21, 17–24, 20–11, 15–26
	Pts: Cruz 20; Rebs: Cook 6 Asts: Ennis 8 PIR: Cruz, Ennis 19	Boxscore	Pts: Gudurić 20; Rebs: Pierre 9 Asts: Veselý 5 PIR: Henry 23	Arena: Tofaş Nilüfer Sports Hall; Referees: Aytuğ Ekti, Ziya Özorhon, Özge Şentürk

23 April 2022 29	Fenerbahçe Beko	92–63	Türk Telekom	Istanbul
15:30	Scoring by quarter: 28–12, 22–19, 25–14, 17–18
	Pts: Birsen 14; Rebs: Biberovic 8 Asts: three players 5 PIR: Biberovic, Düverioğlu 17	Boxscore	Pts: Johnson 16; Rebs: Ellis 9 Asts: Pérez 5 PIR: Ellis, Johnson 14	Arena: Ülker Sports and Event Hall; Referees: Mehmet Karabilecen, Kaan Büyükçil, Duhan Köyiçi

7 May 2022 30	Büyükçekmece Basketbol	88–96	Fenerbahçe Beko	Istanbul
15:30	Scoring by quarter: 20–29, 23–19, 20–19, 25–29
	Pts: Bruinsma, Crawford 17; Rebs: Bruinsma 10; Asts: Crawford 12; PIR: Bruinsma 27	Boxscore	Pts: Düverioğlu 15; Rebs: Düverioğlu 11; Asts: Pierre, Starks 6 PIR: Düverioğlu 26	Arena: Gazanfer Bilge Sports Hall; Referees: Kerem Baki, Mehmet Serdar Ünal, Ziya Özorhon

==== Playoffs ====
===== Quarterfinals =====
Win Loss

15 May 2022 1	Fenerbahçe Beko	100–87	Frutti Extra Bursaspor	Istanbul
15:00	Scoring by quarter: 26–21, 24–26, 23–22, 27–18
	Pts: de Colo 27; Rebs: Pierre, Booker 6 Asts: Henry 8 PIR: de Colo 29	Boxscore	Pts: Bitim 18; Rebs: Bitim, Andrews 4 Asts: Needham 5 PIR: Needham, Bitim 17	Arena: Ülker Sports and Event Hall; Referees: Yener Yılmaz, Mehmet Karabilecen, Özge Şentürk Bayraktar

17 May 2022 2	Frutti Extra Bursaspor	97–77	Fenerbahçe Beko	Bursa
20:30	Scoring by quarter: 21–15, 19–17, 28–29, 29–16
	Pts: Andrews 23; Rebs: Bitim 9 Asts: Needham 7 PIR: Bitim 31	Boxscore	Pts: Booker 16; Rebs: three players 6 Asts: Veselý 5 PIR: Henry 19	Arena: Tofaş Nilüfer Sports Hall; Referees: Mehmet Keseratar, Zafer Yılmaz, Serhat Büker

19 May 2022 3	Fenerbahçe Beko	93–81	Frutti Extra Bursaspor	Istanbul
20:30	Scoring by quarter: 21–24, 29–22, 20–15, 23–20
	Pts: Veselý 16; Rebs: Veselý 8 Asts: Henry 9 PIR: Veselý 25	Boxscore	Pts: Bitim 20; Rebs: Bitim, Türen 6 Asts: Needham 7 PIR: Bitim 18	Arena: Ülker Sports and Event Hall; Referees: Emin Moğulkoç, Kerem Baki, Ziya Özorhon

===== Semifinals =====
Win Loss

24 May 2022 1	Fenerbahçe Beko	94–69	Darüşşafaka	Istanbul
21:00	Scoring by quarter: 24–21, 23–19, 25–16, 22–13
	Pts: Mahmutoğlu 14; Rebs: Birsen 7 Asts: Henry 8 PIR: Henry 23	Boxscore	Pts: Boothe 19; Rebs: Olaseni 6 Asts: Güler 6 PIR: Boothe 19	Arena: Ülker Sports and Event Hall; Referees: Aytuğ Ekti, Alper Altuğ Köselerli, Orhan Çağrı Hekimoğlu

26 May 2022 2	Fenerbahçe Beko	81–82	Darüşşafaka	Istanbul
20:30	Scoring by quarter: 27–15, 14–29, 19–20, 21–18
	Pts: de Colo 24; Rebs: Veselý 8 Asts: Veselý 6 PIR: Veselý 23	Boxscore	Pts: Özdemiroğlu 20; Rebs: Piñeiro 7 Asts: Özdemiroğlu 8 PIR: Özdemiroğlu 25	Arena: Ülker Sports and Event Hall; Referees: Serkan Emlek, Mehmet Karabilecen, Kaan Büyükçil

28 May 2022 3	Darüşşafaka	69–73	Fenerbahçe Beko	Istanbul
19:00	Scoring by quarter: 14–20, 21–20, 13–18, 21–15
	Pts: Olaseni 15; Rebs: Özdemiroğlu 10; Asts: Özdemiroğlu 8 PIR: Özdemiroğlu 18	Boxscore	Pts: Gudurić 12; Rebs: three players 5 Asts: de Colo 5 PIR: Birsen, Gudurić 15	Arena: Ayhan Şahenk Sports Hall; Referees: Emin Moğulkoç, Hüseyin Çelik, Ahmet Tatlıcı

30 May 2022 4	Darüşşafaka	65–91	Fenerbahçe Beko	Istanbul
20:30	Scoring by quarter: 10–16, 13–26, 22–26, 20–23
	Pts: Caupain 15; Rebs: Caupain 10; Asts: Caupain 5 PIR: Caupain 17	Boxscore	Pts: Akpınar 21; Rebs: Veselý, Booker 7 Asts: Düverioğlu 4 PIR: Akpınar 20	Arena: Ayhan Şahenk Sports Hall; Referees: Kerem Baki, Fatih Arslanoğlu, Ziya Özorhon

===== Finals =====
Win Loss

7 June 2022 1	Fenerbahçe Beko	85–76	Anadolu Efes	Istanbul
20:00	Scoring by quarter: 18–20, 19–17, 22–16, 26–23
	Pts: Veselý 17; Rebs: Veselý 7 Asts: de Colo 7 PIR: Veselý 20	Boxscore	Pts: Beaubois 20; Rebs: Singleton, Pleiß 4 Asts: Tuncer 8 PIR: Beaubois 18	Arena: Ülker Sports and Event Hall; Referees: Aytuğ Ekti, Mehmet Şahin, Can Mavisu

9 June 2022 2	Fenerbahçe Beko	93–78	Anadolu Efes	Istanbul
20:30	Scoring by quarter: 18–20, 36–12, 20–17, 19–29
	Pts: Veselý, Gudurić 18; Rebs: Veselý 8 Asts: Birsen 5 PIR: Veselý 26	Boxscore	Pts: Bryant 19; Rebs: Moerman 5 Asts: Larkin 5 PIR: Bryant 22	Arena: Ülker Sports and Event Hall; Referees: Mehmet Keseratar, Erşan Kartal, Kaan Büyükçil

11 June 2022 3	Anadolu Efes	103–92	Fenerbahçe Beko	Istanbul
19:00	Scoring by quarter: 31–25, 21–25, 24–19, 27–23
	Pts: Larkin 37; Rebs: Larkin 5 Asts: Micić 6 PIR: Larkin 36	Boxscore	Pts: Henry 21; Rebs: Veselý 4 Asts: de Colo 5 PIR: Henry 22	Arena: Sinan Erdem Dome; Referees: Emin Moğulkoç, Yener Yılmaz, Hüseyin Çelik

13 June 2022 4	Anadolu Efes	80–92	Fenerbahçe Beko	Istanbul
20:30	Scoring by quarter: 12–24, 23–17, 26–29, 19–22
	Pts: Singleton, Pleiß 17; Rebs: three players 4 Asts: Micić 7 PIR: Pleiß 17	Boxscore	Pts: Veselý 18; Rebs: Veselý 7 Asts: Henry 7 PIR: Veselý 29	Arena: Sinan Erdem Dome; Referees: Aytuğ Ekti, Kerem Baki, Alper Köselerli

=== EuroLeague ===
==== League table ====
Pos	Team	Pld	W	L	PF	PA	PD
10	(German Basketball Federation) ALBA Berlin	28	12	16	2121	2239	−118
11	(Basketball Federation of Serbia) Crvena zvezda mts	28	12	16	2041	2089	−48
12	(Turkish Basketball Federation) Fenerbahçe Beko	28	10	18	2051	2099	−48
13	(Hellenic Basketball Federation) Panathinaikos OPAP	28	9	19	2089	2235	−146
14	(French Federation of Basketball) LDLC ASVEL	28	8	20	2036	2239	−203

Source: EuroLeague
Rules for classification: All points scored in extra period(s) were not counted in the standings, nor for any tie-break situation.

==== Results summary ====
Overall						Home					Away				
Pld	W	L	PF	PA	PD	W	L	PF	PA	PD	W	L	PF	PA	PD
28	10	18	2051	2099	−48	9	5	1038	986	+52	1	13	1013	1113	−100

Source: EuroLeague

==== Results by round ====
Round	1	2	3	4	5	6	7	8	9	10	11	12	13	14	15	16	17	18	19	20	21	22	23	24	25	26	27	28	29	30	31	32	33	34
Ground	H	A	A	H	A	H	A	A	H	A	A	H	H	A	H	H	A	H	A	H	H	H	A	H	A	H	A	A	H	H	A	A	A	H
Result	W	L	L	AN	L	L	L	AN	L	L	L	L	W	AN	W	W	L	W	L	W	W	W	L	W	W	W	L	L	NP	NP	L	L	NP	L
Position	7	9	12	8	10	11	13	10	13	15	15	16	15	13	12	9	10	9	10	9	10	10	10	11	11	11	11	11	11	11	12	12	12	12

Source: EuroLeague.net
A = Away; H = Home; W = Win; L = Loss; AN = Annulated; NP = Not Played

==== Matches ====
Note: All times are CET (UTC+1) as listed by EuroLeague.

1 October 2021 1	Fenerbahçe Beko (Turkey)	61–57	(Serbia) Crvena zvezda mts	Istanbul
19:45	Scoring by quarter: 18–15, 10–11, 17–11, 16–20
	Pts: Pierre 13; Rebs: Booker 9 Asts: Henry 6 PIR: Pierre 19	Boxscore	Pts: Ivanović 16; Rebs: Kalinić 9 Asts: Ivanović 6 PIR: Ivanović 20	Arena: Ülker Sports and Event Hall; Attendance: 1,892; Referees: Fernando Rocha, Elias Koromilas, Joseph Bissang

7 October 2021 2	Panathinaikos OPAP (Greece)	91–87	(Turkey) Fenerbahçe Beko	Marousi, Athens
20:00	Scoring by quarter: 20–21, 25–25, 19–21, 27–20
	Pts: Nedović 20; Rebs: White; Asts: Macon, Papapetrou 4 PIR: Nedović 20	Boxscore	Pts: Veselý 18; Rebs: Veselý 10; Asts: Gudurić, Veselý 5 PIR: Veselý 24	Arena: O.A.K.A. Attendance: 5,800; Referees: Miguel Angel Pérez, Gytis Vilius, Milos Koljensic

12 October 2021 3	ALBA Berlin (Germany)	84–70	(Turkey) Fenerbahçe Beko	Berlin
20:00	Scoring by quarter: 18–19, 9–16, 30–18, 27–17
	Pts: Silva 22; Rebs: Sikma 9 Asts: Smith 7 PIR: Lô 27	Boxscore	Pts: de Colo 15; Rebs: Veselý 11; Asts: de Colo 8 PIR: de Colo 26	Arena: Mercedes-Benz Arena; Attendance: 6,176; Referees: Daniel Hierrezuelo, Jakub Zamojski, Ioannis Foufis

14 October 2021 4	Fenerbahçe Beko (Turkey)	80–41	(Russia) UNICS	Istanbul
19:45	Scoring by quarter: 21–8, 23–14, 17–5, 19–14
	Pts: Shayok 17; Rebs: Düverioğlu, Polonara 8 Asts: Shayok 5 PIR: Booker 22	Boxscore	Pts: Canaan 10; Rebs: J.Brown, Jekiri 6 Asts: L.Brown, Spissu; PIR: L.Brown, Jekiri 9	Arena: Ülker Sports and Event Hall; Attendance: 2,639; Referees: Saša Pukl, Benjamín Jiménez, Vassilis Pitsilkas
Note: On 28 February 2022, the Euroleague Basketball suspended participation of Russian teams following the Russian invasion of Ukraine.

21 October 2021 5	Real Madrid (Spain)	70–69	(Turkey) Fenerbahçe Beko	Madrid
21:00	Scoring by quarter: 10–15, 25–26, 15–11, 20–17
	Pts: Causeur 16; Rebs: Poirier 17; Asts: Fernández 3 PIR: Causeur, Poirier 15	Boxscore	Pts: De Colo 11; Rebs: Polonara 5 Asts: De Colo 6 PIR: De Colo 18	Arena: WiZink Center; Attendance: 6,595; Referees: Damir Javor, Anne Panther, Milan Nedović

26 October 2021 6	Fenerbahçe Beko (Turkey)	74–76	(Spain) Barcelona	Istanbul
19:45	Scoring by quarter: 20–15, 9–20, 19–14, 26–27
	Pts: Veselý 24; Rebs: Veselý 8 Asts: Henry 6 PIR: Veselý 29	Boxscore	Pts: Higgins 18; Rebs: Šmits 8 Asts: Calathes 7 PIR: Davies	Arena: Ülker Sports and Event Hall; Attendance: 5,132; Referees: Robert Lottermoser, Tomislav Hordov, Sašo Petek

28 October 2021 7	Olympiacos (Greece)	67–65	(Turkey) Fenerbahçe Beko	Piraeus
20:00	Scoring by quarter: 19–14, 26–20, 10–19, 12–12
	Pts: Sloukas 14; Rebs: M. Fall 9 Asts: Sloukas 5 PIR: M. Fall 21	Boxscore	Pts: Veselý 14; Rebs: Veselý 9 Asts: Gudurić 4 PIR: Veselý 16	Arena: Peace and Friendship Stadium; Attendance: 0 Referees: Oļegs Latiševs, Gytis Vilius, Rain Peerandi

4 November 2021 8	CSKA Moscow (Russia)	82–91	(Turkey) Fenerbahçe Beko	Moscow
18:00	Scoring by quarter: 21–25, 23–24, 18–20, 20–22
	Pts: Clyburn 26; Rebs: Clyburn 9 Asts: Hackett 5 PIR: Clyburn 34	Boxscore	Pts: De Colo 18; Rebs: Veselý 7 Asts: Booker 5 PIR: Veselý 23	Arena: Megasport Arena; Attendance: 3,031; Referees: Borys Ryzhyk, Saulius Račys, Uroš Nikolić
Note: On 28 February 2022, the Euroleague Basketball suspended participation of Russian teams following the Russian invasion of Ukraine.

12 November 2021 9	Fenerbahçe Beko (Turkey)	43–68	(Italy) Armani Exchange Milan	Istanbul
18:45	Scoring by quarter: 3–22, 17–15, 9–25, 14–6
	Pts: Henry 12; Rebs: Veselý 6 Asts: De Colo, Pierre 3 PIR: Veselý 21	Boxscore	Pts: Shields 13; Rebs: four players 6 Asts: Rodríguez 7 PIR: Melli, Shields 17	Arena: Ülker Sports and Event Hall; Attendance: 8,601; Referees: Saša Pukl, Fernando Rocha, Jakub Zamojski

16 November 2021 10	Bayern Munich (Germany)	71–63	(Turkey) Fenerbahçe Beko	Munich
20:30	Scoring by quarter: 22–12, 13–18, 14–16, 22–17
	Pts: Lučić 22; Rebs: Lučić 7 Asts: Lučić 3 PIR: Lučić 28	Boxscore	Pts: Gudurić 16; Rebs: Veselý 7 Asts: Veselý 3 PIR: Veselý 23	Arena: Audi Dome; Attendance: 4,000; Referees: Daniel Hierrezuelo, Mehdi Difallah, Tomislav Hordov

19 November 2021 11	Žalgiris (Lithuania)	86–75	(Turkey) Fenerbahçe Beko	Kaunas
19:00	Scoring by quarter: 16–18, 22–11, 26–30, 22–16
	Pts: Ulanovas 18; Rebs: Nebo 7 Asts: Kalnietis 11; PIR: Ulanovas 21	Boxscore	Pts: de Colo 17; Rebs: Henry 5 Asts: de Colo 5 PIR: de Colo 26	Arena: Žalgiris Arena; Attendance: 10,067; Referees: Luigi Lamonica, Piotr Pastusiak, Gentian Cici

25 November 2021 12	Fenerbahçe Beko (Turkey)	84–89	(Turkey) Anadolu Efes	Istanbul
18:45	Scoring by quarter: 18–20, 23–16, 26–20, 17–33
	Pts: Shayok 18; Rebs: Polonara 8 Asts: de Colo 5 PIR: de Colo 19	Boxscore	Pts: Larkin 25; Rebs: Beaubois 5 Asts: Larkin 7 PIR: Larkin 29	Arena: Ülker Sports and Event Hall; Attendance: 6,286; Referees: Miguel Ángel Pérez, Sreten Radović, Sašo Petek

2 December 2021 13	Fenerbahçe Beko (Turkey)	96–86	(France) Monaco	Istanbul
18:45	Scoring by quarter: 16–18, 24–24, 23–21, 33–23
	Pts: Veselý 20; Rebs: Veselý 10; Asts: Henry 6 PIR: Veselý 32	Boxscore	Pts: James 31; Rebs: Ouattara 6 Asts: Lee 5 PIR: James 33	Arena: Ülker Sports and Event Hall; Attendance: 3,307; Referees: Matej Boltauzer, Juan Carlos García, Saulius Račys

9 December 2021 14	Zenit Saint Petersburg (Russia)	80–86	(Turkey) Fenerbahçe Beko	Saint Petersburg
18:00	Scoring by quarter: 18–16, 23–24, 21–21, 18–25
	Pts: Loyd 19; Rebs: Gudaitis 7 Asts: Frankamp 4 PIR: Loyd 19	Boxscore	Pts: Veselý 32; Rebs: Veselý 5 Asts: de Colo 8 PIR: Veselý 35	Arena: Sibur Arena; Attendance: 2,283; Referees: Saša Pukl, Fernando Rocha, Gytis Vilius
Note: On 28 February 2022, the Euroleague Basketball suspended participation of Russian teams following the Russian invasion of Ukraine.

14 December 2021 15	Fenerbahçe Beko (Turkey)	90–79	(Israel) Maccabi Tel Aviv	Istanbul
18:45	Scoring by quarter: 23–18, 19–19, 28–14, 20–28
	Pts: Booker 22; Rebs: Veselý, Booker 6 Asts: de Colo 5 PIR: de Colo 25	Boxscore	Pts: Nunnally 18; Rebs: Žižić 11; Asts: Evans 7 PIR: Evans, Nunnally 17	Arena: Ülker Sports and Event Hall; Attendance: 5,130; Referees: Luigi Lamonica, Oļegs Latiševs, Uroš Nikolić

16 December 2021 16	Fenerbahçe Beko (Turkey)	75–53	(Spain) TD Systems Baskonia	Istanbul
18:45	Scoring by quarter: 19–14, 24–14, 12–15, 20–10
	Pts: de Colo 17; Rebs: three players 5 Asts: de Colo 7 PIR: de Colo 26	Boxscore	Pts: Enoch 14; Rebs: Costello, Enoch 8 Asts: L. Peters 4 PIR: Enoch 16	Arena: Ülker Sports and Event Hall; Attendance: 5,217; Referees: Robert Lottermoser, Piotr Pastusiak, Miloš Koljenšić

23 December 2021 17	LDLC ASVEL (France)	84–82	(Turkey) Fenerbahçe Beko	Villeurbanne, Lyon
20:00	Scoring by quarter: 21–20, 22–26, 21–14, 20–22
	Pts: Jones 27; Rebs: Howard 5 Asts: Okobo, Jones 3 PIR: Jones 30	Boxscore	Pts: Polonara 23; Rebs: Polonara 11; Asts: Veselý 5 PIR: Polonara 33	Arena: Astroballe; Attendance: 5,472; Referees: Juan Carlos García, Sašo Petek, Josip Radojković

11 January 2022 20	Fenerbahçe Beko (Turkey)	94–80	(Greece) Olympiacos	Istanbul
18:45	Scoring by quarter: 11–17, 25–22, 30–20, 28–21
	Pts: Mahmutoğlu 17; Rebs: Polonara 7 Asts: Henry 8 PIR: Henry 19	Boxscore	Pts: Dorsey, Sloukas 14; Rebs: Dorsey, Sloukas 5 Asts: Sloukas 7 PIR: Sloukas 23	Arena: Ülker Sports and Event Hall; Attendance: 3,412; Referees: Miguel Ángel Pérez, Robert Lottermoser, Michele Rossi

20 January 2022 22	Fenerbahçe Beko (Turkey)	73–67	(Lithuania) Žalgiris	Istanbul
18:45	Scoring by quarter: 7–13, 17–17, 20–21, 29–16
	Pts: Gudurić 19; Rebs: Polonara 8 Asts: Gudurić 5 PIR: Gudurić 27	Boxscore	Pts: Ulanovas 16; Rebs: Cavanaugh 13; Asts: Blaževič, Kalnietis 4 PIR: Blaževič 17	Arena: Ülker Sports and Event Hall; Attendance: 3,813; Referees: Juan Carlos García, Carmelo Paternicò, Luka Kardum

1 February 2022 24	Fenerbahçe Beko (Turkey)	85–76	(France) LDLC ASVEL	Istanbul
18:45	Scoring by quarter: 29–23, 18–18, 17–22, 21–13
	Pts: Booker, Pierre 16; Rebs: Pierre 8 Asts: Henry 7 PIR: Pierre 21	Boxscore	Pts: Okobo 23; Rebs: Kahudi 6 Asts: Jones 8 PIR: Kahudi 16	Arena: Ülker Sports and Event Hall; Referees: Damir Javor, Uroš Nikolić, Jakub Zamojski

3 February 2022 25	Armani Exchange Milan (Italy)	60–71	(Turkey) Fenerbahçe Beko	Milan
20:30	Scoring by quarter: 12–18, 22–25, 17–11, 9–17
	Pts: Bentil 12; Rebs: Hines, Ricci 4 Asts: Delaney 5 PIR: Delaney 16	Boxscore	Pts: Gudurić 17; Rebs: Booker 8 Asts: Gudurić 6 PIR: Gudurić 24	Arena: Mediolanum Forum; Referees: Saša Pukl, Joseph Bissang, Josip Radojković

8 February 2022 18	Fenerbahçe Beko (Turkey)	66–51	(Spain) Real Madrid	Istanbul
18:45	Scoring by quarter: 19–8, 8–9, 21–13, 12–21
	Pts: Gudurić 12; Rebs: Booker, Pierre 8 Asts: Henry 9 PIR: Henry 18	Boxscore	Pts: Tavares 14; Rebs: Tavares 9 Asts: Alocén 5 PIR: Tavares 27	Arena: Ülker Sports and Event Hall; Referees: Sreten Radović, Gytis Vilius, Robert Vyklický
Note: The game, originally scheduled for 29 December 2021, was postponed due to a COVID-19 outbreak within Real Madrid's squad.

25 February 2022 27	Monaco (France)	92–78	(Turkey) Fenerbahçe Beko	Fontvieille, Monaco
19:00	Scoring by quarter: 19–20, 36–13, 20–22, 17–23
	Pts: Diallo 24; Rebs: Motiejūnas 9 Asts: Westermann 6 PIR: Diallo 26	Boxscore	Pts: De Colo 19; Rebs: Pierre 6 Asts: Pierre 3 PIR: De Colo 19	Arena: Salle Gaston Médecin; Referees: Luigi Lamonica, Benjamín Jiménez, Marcin Kowalski

27 February 2022 19	Crvena zvezda mts (Serbia)	74–69	(Turkey) Fenerbahçe Beko	Belgrade
19:00	Scoring by quarter: 20–18, 21–19, 18–23, 15–9
	Pts: Kalinić 11; Rebs: Davidovac, Mitrović 6 Asts: Ivanović 4 PIR: Davidovac 16	Boxscore	Pts: Barthel 15; Rebs: Booker 7 Asts: de Colo 6 PIR: Pierre 17	Arena: Aleksandar Nikolić Hall; Referees: Miguel Angel Pérez, Michele Rossi, Jakub Zamojski
Note: The game, originally scheduled for 6 January 2022, was postponed due to a COVID-19 outbreak within Zvezda's squad.

3 March 2022 28	Anadolu Efes (Turkey)	84–79	(Turkey) Fenerbahçe Beko	Istanbul
20:30	Scoring by quarter: 23–14, 18–11, 18–23, 25–31
	Pts: Micić 24; Rebs: Pleiß 9 Asts: Larkin 9 PIR: Micić 23	Boxscore	Pts: Pierre 19; Rebs: Pierre, Polonara 7 Asts: Hazer 5 PIR: Pierre 23	Arena: Sinan Erdem Dome; Referees: Juan Carlos García, Fernando Rocha, Saulius Račys

29	Fenerbahçe Beko (Turkey)	Not played	(Russia) CSKA Moscow	Istanbul
		Boxscore		Arena: Ülker Sports and Event Hall
Note: On 28 February 2022, the Euroleague Basketball suspended participation of Russian teams following the Russian invasion of Ukraine.

30	Fenerbahçe Beko (Turkey)	Not played	(Russia) Zenit Saint Petersburg	Istanbul
		Boxscore		Arena: Ülker Sports and Event Hall
Note: On 28 February 2022, the Euroleague Basketball suspended participation of Russian teams following the Russian invasion of Ukraine.

23 March 2022 31	TD Systems Baskonia (Spain)	77–62	(Turkey) Fenerbahçe Beko	Vitoria-Gasteiz
20:30	Scoring by quarter: 20–19, 12–21, 22–13, 23–9
	Pts: Baldwin IV 24; Rebs: Enoch 9 Asts: Baldwin IV 6 PIR: Baldwin IV 25	Boxscore	Pts: Veselý 15; Rebs: Veselý 9 Asts: Gudurić 6 PIR: Veselý 23	Arena: Buesa Arena; Referees: Olegs Latisevs, Mehdi Difallah, Sergio Silva

25 March 2022 32	Barcelona (Spain)	88–67	(Turkey) Fenerbahçe Beko	Barcelona
21:00	Scoring by quarter: 25–21, 17–13, 28–15, 18–18
	Pts: Abrines, Mirotić 18; Rebs: Calathes, Hayes 5 Asts: Calathes 10; PIR: Mirotić 20	Boxscore	Pts: Gudurić 15; Rebs: Gudurić 5 Asts: Veselý 3 PIR: Akpınar, Gudurić 11	Arena: Palau Blaugrana; Referees: Matej Boltauzer, Fernando Rocha, Rain Peerandi

33	UNICS (Russia)	Not played	(Turkey) Fenerbahçe Beko	Kazan
		Boxscore		Arena: Basket-Hall Kazan
Note: On 28 February 2022, the Euroleague Basketball suspended participation of Russian teams following the Russian invasion of Ukraine.

29 March 2022 21	Fenerbahçe Beko (Turkey)	57–66	(Germany) ALBA Berlin	Istanbul
19:00	Scoring by quarter: 19–16, 8–21, 11–11, 19–18
	Pts: Mahmutoğlu 16; Rebs: Pierre 7 Asts: four players 3 PIR: Pierre 15	Boxscore	Pts: Zoosman 20; Rebs: da Silva 9 Asts: Smith 6 PIR: Zoosman 18	Arena: Ülker Sports and Event Hall; Attendance: 6,079; Referees: Borys Ryzhyk, Emilio Pérez, Tomasz Trawicki

4 April 2022 26	Fenerbahçe Beko (Turkey)	81–76	(Germany) Bayern Munich	Istanbul
19:45	Scoring by quarter: 27−16, 18−15, 9−31, 27−14
	Pts: Henry 22; Rebs: Vesely 10; Asts: Henry 8 PIR: Henry 31	Boxscore	Pts: Rubit 17; Rebs: Rubit 5 Asts: Šiško; PIR: Rubit 22	Arena: Ülker Sports and Event Hall; Attendance: 8,288; Referees: Milivoje Jovčić, Elias Koromilas, Luka Kardum

8 April 2022 34	Fenerbahçe Beko (Turkey)	59–62	(Greece) Panathinaikos OPAP	Istanbul
19:45	Scoring by quarter: 20–22, 12–16, 17–6, 10–18
	Pts: Veselý 20; Rebs: Veselý 7 Asts: Henry, Starks 4 PIR: Veselý 29	Boxscore	Pts: Papapetrou 21; Rebs: Papagiannis 12; Asts: Papapetrou 6 PIR: Papagiannis 31	Arena: Ülker Sports and Event Hall; Attendance: 2,577; Referees: Juan Carlos García, Carmelo Paternico, Uroš Nikolić

13 April 2022 23	Maccabi Tel Aviv (Israel)	85–76	(Turkey) Fenerbahçe Beko	Tel Aviv
19:30	Scoring by quarter: 21–21, 24–22, 21–19, 19–14
	Pts: Nunnally 19; Rebs: Nunnally, Žižić 7 Asts: Wilbekin 6 PIR: Nunnally 25	Boxscore	Pts: Booker 14; Rebs: Düverioğlu 5 Asts: Henry 8 PIR: Booker 14	Arena: Menora Mivtachim Arena; Referees: Sreten Radović, Sašo Petek, Jordi Aliaga

=== Turkish Basketball Cup ===
==== Quarterfinals ====
15 February 2022	Tofaş	88–93(OT)	Fenerbahçe Beko	Bursa
20:30 TRT (UTC +3)	Scoring by quarter: 25 –16, 23 –21, 16 –15, 12– 24, Overtime: 12– 17
Tivibuspor	Pts: Cook 20; Rebs: Cook, Ennis 7 Asts: Uğurlu 6 PIR: Cook 22	Report	Pts: Mahmutoğlu 27; Rebs: Polonara 9 Asts: Henry 6 PIR: Mahmutoğlu 21	Arena: Tofaş Nilüfer Sports Hall; Referees: Mehmet Şahin, Altuğ Köselerli, Kaan Büyükçil

==== Semifinals ====
18 February 2022	Fenerbahçe Beko	64–49	Galatasaray Nef	Bursa
18:00	Scoring by quarter: 20–18, 16–13, 12–8, 16–10
Tivibuspor	Pts: Gudurić 20; Rebs: Pierre 9 Asts: Henry 4 PIR: Gudurić 21	Report	Pts: Trimble 16; Rebs: Akoon-Purcell 6 Asts: Bost 7 PIR: Blackshear 13	Arena: Tofaş Nilüfer Spor Salonu; Referees: Emin Moğulkoç, Kerem Baki, Can Mavisu

==== Final ====
20 February 2022	Fenerbahçe Beko	72–86	Anadolu Efes	Bursa
17:00	Scoring by quarter: 14–16, 13–25, 22–21, 23–24
Tivibuspor	Pts: Booker 17; Rebs: Booker 5 Asts: Starks 5 PIR: Booker 20	Report	Pts: Micić 23; Rebs: Moerman 16; Asts: Larkin 7 PIR: Pleiß 25	Arena: Tofaş Nilüfer Spor Salonu; Referees: Aytuğ Ekti, Can Mavisu, Hüseyin Çelik

== Statistics ==
Legend
GP	Games played	GS	Games started	MPG	Minutes per game
FG%	Field-goal percentage	3FG%	3-point field-goal percentage	FT%	Free-throw percentage
RPG	Rebounds per game	APG	Assists per game	SPG	Steals per game
BPG	Blocks per game	PPG	Points per game	PIR	PIR per game

Player	Left during season

=== Basketbol Süper Ligi ===
Player	GP	GS	MPG	2FG%	3FG%	FT%	RPG	APG	SPG	BPG	PPG	PIR
İsmet Akpınar	34		12:44	.542	.458	.796	0.9	1.5	0.2	0.1	6.0	5.5
Danilo Barthel	3		23:51	.455	.000	.714	5.7	1.0	0.3	0.3	5.0	7.3
Tarık Biberovic	36		11:33	.500	.430	.839	1.5	0.9	0.5	0.1	5.4	5.5
Metecan Birsen	41		16:14	.623	.300	.780	2.9	1.0	0.5	0.1	5.3	6.7
Devin Booker	31		24:16	.574	.450	.860	4.0	2.1	0.4	0.2	9.9	11.9
Nando de Colo	21		23:33	.571	.446	.948	2.3	4.7	1.1	0.1	15.1	15.9
Ahmet Düverioğlu	36		14:45	.664	.000	.603	4.0	1.2	0.5	0.5	6.2	9.3
Jehyve Floyd	12		15:49	.632	.000	.589	3.3	1.3	0.4	0.8	4.8	8.2
Marko Gudurić	28		20:26	.494	.388	.884	2.5	3.0	0.7	0.1	10.5	10.6
Şehmus Hazer	35		15:14	.547	.387	.632	1.6	2.2	0.8	0.1	6.0	6.4
Pierriá Henry	30		27:48	.500	.444	.821	2.7	5.9	1.7	0.1	8.5	12.8
Melih Mahmutoğlu	41		17:41	.612	.440	.905	0.9	0.9	0.4	0	10.4	8.3
Dyshawn Pierre	23		24:08	.632	.314	.726	5.2	2.5	0.7	0.3	8.5	12.0
Achille Polonara	20		25:52	.632	.275	.757	5.7	2.0	0.8	0.4	10.0	12.7
Markel Starks	4		22:10	.667	.727	1.000	3.0	4.0	0	0	11.0	14.5
Jan Veselý	24		25:17	.694	.125	.686	6.2	2.9	1.5	0.8	10.7	17.1
Marial Shayok	9		21:58	.619	.250	1.000	3.7	2.3	0.3	0.1	7.3	9.2

Source: Basketbol Süper Ligi

=== EuroLeague ===
Player	GP	GS	MPG	2FG%	3FG%	FT%	RPG	APG	SPG	BPG	PPG	PIR
İsmet Akpınar	14	3	11:40	.400	.423	.875	0.7	0.9	0.1	0.1	4.8	2.8
Danilo Barthel	8	1	11:08	.524	.250	.938	1.5	0.6	0.2	0	4.5	5.6
Tarık Biberovic	7	2	10:20	.375	.091	1.000	0.7	0.6	0.4	0.1	2.4	0.6
Metecan Birsen	14	0	7:54	.200	.167	.250	1.2	0.3	0.1	0	0.9	0.6
Devin Booker	29	26	24:19	.623	.385	.786	4.4	1.6	0.7	0.2	9.1	10.9
Nando de Colo	21	5	22:06	.617	.316	.867	2.2	3.8	1.3	0.2	11.9	14.1
Ahmet Düverioğlu	18	6	8:21	.737	.000	.500	2.4	0.1	0.2	0.2	3.6	4.6
Jehyve Floyd	14	5	12:51	.667	.000	.538	2.0	0.6	0.5	0.4	3.4	4.4
Marko Gudurić	28	10	20:31	.563	.356	.857	2.2	2.8	0.8	0.1	10.2	9.8
Şehmus Hazer	25	5	12:25	.600	.313	.636	1.1	1.1	0.8	0	4.8	3.4
Pierriá Henry	28	27	28:42	.436	.324	.733	3.4	4.2	1.8	0.1	7.9	9.6
Melih Mahmutoğlu	26	6	10:46	.571	.286	.600	0.3	0.3	0.3	0	4.4	1.7
Dyshawn Pierre	28	26	27:46	.556	.304	.800	4.4	2.0	1.0	0.4	8.3	11.4
Achille Polonara	30	4	22:21	.630	.314	.615	4.3	1.1	0.7	0.5	7.3	9.0
Markel Starks	4	0	9:00	.000	.133	.000	0.5	1.5	0	0	0.8	-0.5
Jan Veselý	22	20	28:30	.635	.250	.735	6.1	2.5	1.1	0.4	13.6	18.2
Marial Shayok	15	9	14:29	.465	.348	1.000	1.3	1.3	0.3	0.1	4.6	2.7

Source: EuroLeague
