= 2021–22 Anadolu Efes S.K. season =

Anadolu Efes
2021–22 season
- President: Tuncay Özilhan
- Head coach: Ergin Ataman
- Arena: Sinan Erdem Dome
- Basketbol Süper Ligi: 2nd seed
- Playoffs: Runners-up
- EuroLeague: 6th seed
- Playoffs: Champions
- Turkish Basketball Cup: Champions
Home	Away

The 2021–22 season is Anadolu Efes's 42nd season in the existence of the club. The team plays in the Basketball Super League and in the EuroLeague.

== Players ==
=== Squad information ===
Note: Flags indicate national team eligibility at FIBA-sanctioned events. Players may hold other non-FIBA nationalities not displayed.

Anadolu Efes roster
Players
Coaches

Pos.	No.	Nat.	Name	Ht.	Wt.	Age
G	0	(United States) (Turkey)	Larkin, Shane (DC)	1.80 m (5 ft 11 in)	79 kg (174 lb)	29 – 2 October 1992
SG	1	(France)	Beaubois, Rodrigue	1.88 m (6 ft 2 in)	84 kg (185 lb)	34 – 24 February 1988
PF	2	(United States)	Singleton, Chris	2.06 m (6 ft 9 in)	108 kg (238 lb)	32 – 21 November 1989
F	3	(Turkey)	Saybir, Yiğitcan	2.02 m (6 ft 8 in)	88 kg (194 lb)	23 – 27 February 1999
SG	4	(Turkey)	Balbay, Doğuş (C)	1.85 m (6 ft 1 in)	82 kg (181 lb)	33 – 21 January 1989
SG	6	(United States)	Bryant, Elijah	1.96 m (6 ft 5 in)	95 kg (209 lb)	27 – 19 April 1995
F	8	(Turkey)	Geçim, Tolga	2.06 m (6 ft 9 in)	91 kg (201 lb)	26 – 27 March 1996
PG	10	(Turkey)	İlyasoğlu, Ömercan	1.95 m (6 ft 5 in)	85 kg (187 lb)	21 – 1 January 2001
SG	11	(Turkey)	Gazi, Erten	1.91 m (6 ft 3 in)	93 kg (205 lb)	24 – 15 June 1997
PF	18	(France)	Moerman, Adrien	2.03 m (6 ft 8 in)	102 kg (225 lb)	33 – 7 August 1988
G	19	(Turkey)	Tuncer, Buğrahan	1.93 m (6 ft 4 in)	90 kg (198 lb)	29 – 23 March 1993
C	21	(Germany)	Pleiß, Tibor	2.21 m (7 ft 3 in)	116 kg (256 lb)	32 – 2 November 1989
PG	22	(Serbia)	Micić, Vasilije	1.96 m (6 ft 5 in)	92 kg (203 lb)	28 – 13 January 1994
SF	23	(United States)	Anderson, James	1.98 m (6 ft 6 in)	98 kg (216 lb)	33 – 25 March 1989
C	33	(Serbia)	Petrušev, Filip	2.11 m (6 ft 11 in)	107 kg (236 lb)	22 – 15 April 2000
C	42	(United States) (Armenia)	Dunston, Bryant (DC)	2.03 m (6 ft 8 in)	114 kg (251 lb)	36 – 28 May 1986
SF	44	(Croatia)	Simon, Krunoslav	1.97 m (6 ft 6 in)	100 kg (220 lb)	36 – 24 June 1985

Head coach

- (Turkey) Ergin Ataman

Assistant coach(es)

- (Croatia) Tomislav Mijatović
- (Turkey) Yakup Sekizkök
- (Turkey) Cenk Yıldırım

Team manager

- (Turkey) Alper Yılmaz

Legend

- (C) Team captain
- Injured

- Roster

=== Depth chart ===
Pos.	Starting 5	Bench 1	Bench 2	Bench 3
C	Tibor Pleiß	Bryant Dunston	Filip Petrušev
PF	Adrien Moerman	Chris Singleton	Yiğitcan Saybir
SF	Krunoslav Simon	James Anderson	Tolga Geçim
SG	Shane Larkin	Elijah Bryant	Doğuş Balbay	Erten Gazi
PG	Vasilije Micić	Rodrigue Beaubois	Buğrahan Tuncer	Ömercan İlyasoğlu

(colours: Turkish or homegrown players; foreign players)

=== Squad changes for the 2021–2022 season ===
==== In ====
No.	Pos.	Nat.	Name	Age	Moving from		Ends	Date	Source
33	F/C	(Serbia)	Filip Petrušev	21	KK Mega Basket	(Serbia)	June 2022	August 17, 2021	
6	G	(United States)	Elijah Bryant	26	Milwaukee Bucks	(United States)	June 2023	October 18, 2021	

==== Out ====
No.	Pos.	Nat.	Name	Age	Moving to		Date	Source
15	C	(Turkey)	Sertaç Şanlı	29	FC Barcelona Bàsquet	(Spain)	July 1, 2021	
–	C	(Turkey)	Tarık Sezgün	20	Frutti Extra Bursaspor	(Turkey)	July 7, 2021	
–	SG	(Turkey)	Mustafa Kurtuldum	20	Büyükçekmece Basketbol	(Turkey)	July 10, 2021	
13	SF	(Bosnia and Herzegovina)	Džanan Musa	22	CB Breogán	(Spain)	July 21, 2021	

== Competitions ==
=== Results ===
Competition	Progress
EuroLeague	Champions
Basketball Super League	Runners-up
Turkish Basketball Cup	Champions

=== Basketball Super League ===
==== League table ====
Pos	Team	Pld	W	L	PF	PA	PD	Pts	Qualification or relegation
1	Fenerbahçe Beko	30	24	6	2527	2209	+318	54	Advance to playoffs
2	Anadolu Efes	30	23	7	2699	2405	+294	53	Advance to playoffs
3	Galatasaray Nef	30	20	10	2608	2387	+221	50	Advance to playoffs
4	Gaziantep Basketbol	30	19	11	2414	2276	+138	49	Advance to playoffs
5	Darüşşafaka	30	19	11	2372	2218	+154	49	Advance to playoffs

Source: Basketbol Süper Ligi

=== EuroLeague ===
==== League table ====
Pos	Team	Pld	W	L	PF	PA	PD	Qualification
4	(Spanish Basketball Federation) Real Madrid	28	18	10	2181	2079	+102	Qualification to playoffs
5	(Israeli Basketball Association) Maccabi Tel Aviv	28	17	11	2272	2209	+63	Qualification to playoffs
6	(Turkish Basketball Federation) Anadolu Efes	28	16	12	2322	2221	+101	Qualification to playoffs
7	(French Federation of Basketball) AS Monaco	28	15	13	2311	2225	+86	Qualification to playoffs
8	(German Basketball Federation) Bayern Munich	28	14	14	2123	2105	+18	Qualification to playoffs

Source: EuroLeague
Rules for classification: All points scored in extra period(s) were not counted in the standings, nor for any tie-break situation.
