= Markel Starks =

American basketball player

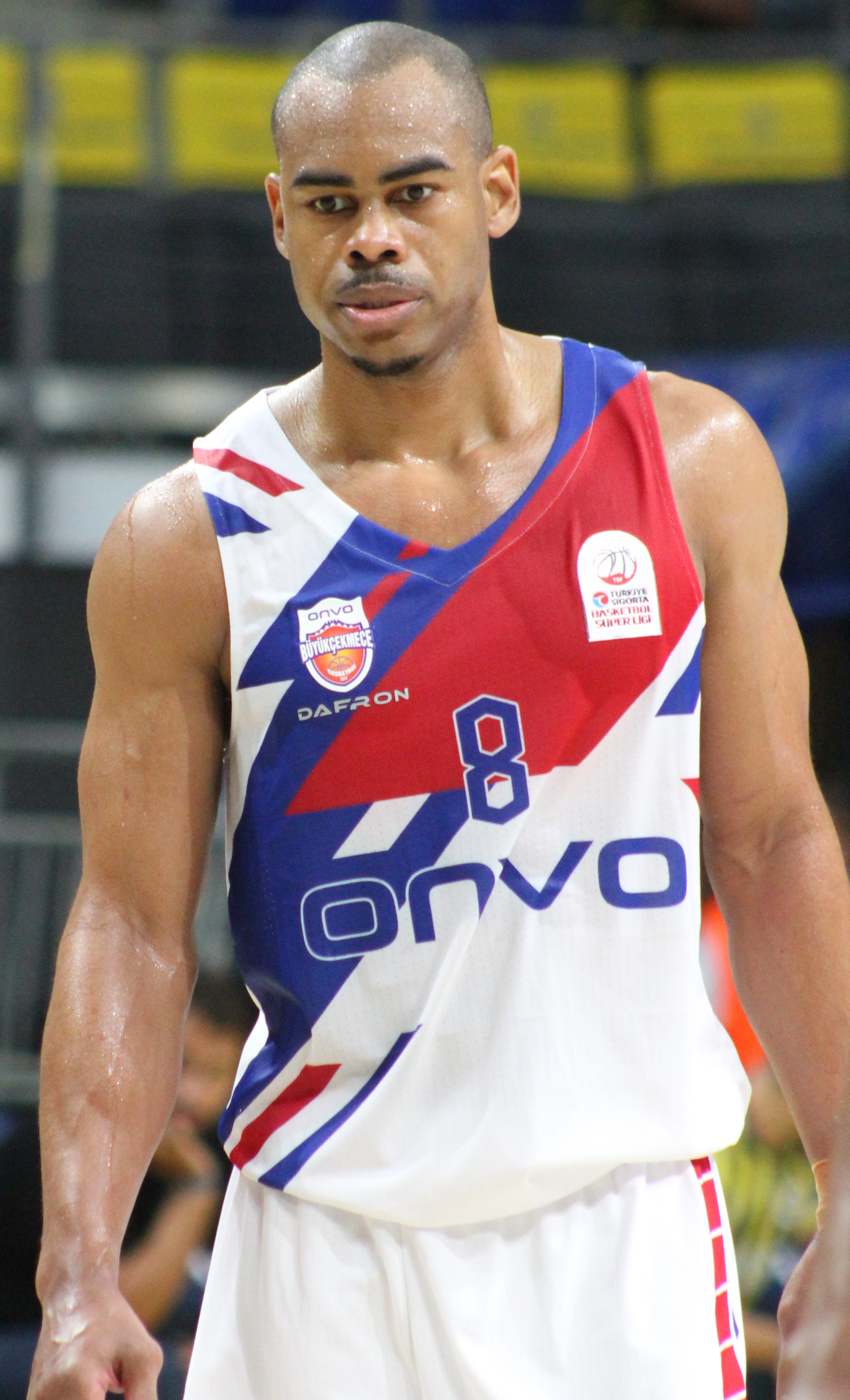
- Starks playing for Büyükçekmece in 2024

No. 4 – Karşıyaka Basket
- Position: Point guard
- League: Basketbol Süper Ligi

Personal information
- Born: February 21, 1991 (age 35) Accokeek, Maryland, U.S.
- Listed height: 6 ft 2 in (1.88 m)
- Listed weight: 175 lb (79 kg)

Career information
- High school: Georgetown Prep (North Bethesda, Maryland)
- College: Georgetown (2010–2014)
- NBA draft: 2014: undrafted
- Playing career: 2014–present

Career history
- 2014–2015: FMC Ferentino
- 2015–2016: Cairns Taipans
- 2016: Vanoli Cremona
- 2016: Skyliners Frankfurt
- 2016–2017: Koroivos Amaliadas
- 2017–2018: Yalova Belediyesi
- 2018: Piratas de Quebradillas
- 2018–2019: Stelmet Zielona Góra
- 2019–2021: Avtodor Saratov
- 2021–2022: Igokea
- 2022: Fenerbahçe Beko
- 2022–2023: Darüşşafaka
- 2023: Andorra
- 2023–2024: Petkim Spor
- 2024–2025: Büyükçekmece
- 2025–2026: Panionios
- 2026: Manisa
- 2026–present: Karşıyaka Basket

Career highlights
- Turkish League champion (2022); VTB United League Free Throw Percentage leader (2020); Turkish First League assists leader (2018); First-team All-Big East (2014); Third-team All-Big East (2013)

Anthony Markel Starks II (born February 21, 1991) is an American professional basketball player for Karşıyaka Basket of the Turkish Basketbol Süper Ligi (BSL). Born in Accokeek, Maryland, he played high school basketball for Georgetown Prep and college basketball for Georgetown University.

== High school career ==
Starks attended Georgetown Preparatory School in North Bethesda, Maryland where he played for coach Dwayne Bryant and was teammates with future PGA golfer Denny McCarthy. As a freshman in 2006–07, he averaged 10 points, 5 assists and 3 rebounds per game as he led Prep to a 15-10 record, the IAC Tournament Championship and he was named the conference Freshman of the Year. As a sophomore in 2007–08, he averaged 15 points, 10 assists and 5 rebounds per game as he led Prep to an 18-7 record and the IAC Tournament Championship for the second straight year. He subsequently earned All-IAC and first-team All-Montgomery County honors.

On September 25, 2008, Starks committed to nearby Georgetown University. As a junior in 2008–09, he averaged 22 points, 8 assists and 5 rebounds per game as he earned first-team All-Met, All-Montgomery County and All-IAC honors. As a senior in 2009–10, he averaged 25 points, 8 assists and 5 rebounds per game as he led Prep to an 18-7 record. He subsequently earned first-team All-Met honors, was named to the All-Decade Team in Montgomery County (Md.), was named the county Player of the Year and the IAC Player of the Year.

Starks was a top one-hundred recruit out of Georgetown Prep as he was ranked 76th by ESPN 100 and 80th by Rivals.com. He officially signed with Georgetown University on March 29, 2010.

== College career ==
After an outstanding high school career, Starks joined the Georgetown Hoyas for his freshman season in 2010–11. He appeared in 30 games while averaging 1.5 points, 0.7 assists and 0.6 rebounds in 9.7 minutes per game.

As a sophomore in 2011–12, Starks appeared in 31 games with 25 starting assignments. He was fifth on the team in scoring with 7.1 points per game while he connected on 45.5 percent of his field goals (80-of-176) and 36.7 percent of his three-point field goals (36-of-98). He also averaged 1.6 rebounds and 1.6 assists in 24.4 minutes per game.

As a junior in 2012–13, Starks stepped up his game as he averaged 12.8 points per game which earned him third-team All-Big East honors. In 32 games (all starts), he also averaged 1.8 rebounds, 3.0 assists and 1.3 steals in 34.1 minutes per game.

During Starks′ senior season in 2013–14, head coach John Thompson III gave him 37.0 minutes per game. To Starks' credit, he improved once again, increasing his scoring average to 17.3 points per game despite his field goal percentage dropping from 45.7% as a junior to 41.2% as a senior. He subsequently earned first-team All-Big East and second-team NABC Division I All-District 5 honors. In 33 games (all starts), he also averaged 2.3 rebounds and 4.1 assists per game.

== Professional career ==
After going undrafted in the 2014 NBA draft, Starks joined the Detroit Pistons for the Orlando Summer League and the Minnesota Timberwolves for the Las Vegas Summer League. On July 30, 2014, he signed with FMC Ferentino of Italy for the 2014–15 season. In 34 games for Ferentino, he averaged 14.7 points, 2.4 rebounds and 4.0 assists per game.

On August 12, 2015, Starks signed with the Cairns Taipans for the 2015–16 NBL season. On September 28, he was named the joint MVP winner of the 2015 Pre-season Blitz tournament alongside Stephen Holt of Melbourne United. Both players were awarded the Ray Borner MVP Medal for leading their clubs to clean sweeps in the NBL's annual pre-season tournament. Starks helped the Taipans finish the five-day tournament with a 3–0 win–loss record, and over those three games, Starks averaged 13.7 points per game. On October 31, Starks had a season-best game with 27 points and a buzzer beating game-winning three-pointer to lift the Taipans over the line against the Adelaide 36ers, winning the contest 104–101. He bested that performance on December 11, scoring a season-high 33 points in a 103–101 double overtime win over the Illawarra Hawks. Starks appeared in all 16 games to begin the season before a hamstring injury suffered on December 17 ruled him out for two straight games. He returned to action on January 6, 2016, but limped through the rest of the season. Having averaged a serviceable 14.5 points over his first 15 games, his points per game average dropped to 9.7 over his final 11 contests. The Taipans finished the season outside the top four, thus missing the playoffs with a 12–16 win–loss record. Starks appeared in 26 games for the Taipans, averaging 12.5 points, 2.2 rebounds and 2.3 assists per game.

On February 25, 2016, Starks signed with Vanoli Cremona for the rest of the 2015–16 Lega Basket Serie A season, returning to Italy for a second stint.

On August 17, 2019, Starks signed with Avtodor Saratov of the VTB United League. He averaged 14.4 points, 5.9 assists, and 1.2 steals per game. Starks re-signed with the team on June 23, 2020.

On June 20, 2021, he has signed with Igokea of the Adriatic League. Starks averaged 12.6 points, 6.8 assists and 1.8 steals per game.

On January 22, 2022, he signed with Fenerbahçe of the Turkish Basketball Super League (BSL).

On June 18, 2022, he has signed with Darüşşafaka of the Turkish Basketbol Süper Ligi (BSL).

On December 26, 2023, he signed with Petkim Spor of the Basketbol Süper Ligi (BSL).

On August 9, 2024, he signed with ONVO Büyükçekmece of the Basketbol Süper Ligi (BSL).

On June 24, 2025, Starks signed a deal with Panionios of the Greek Basket League.

On January 22, 2026, he signed with Körfez Basket of the Basketbol Süper Ligi (BSL).

On September 4, 2026, he signed with Karşıyaka Basket of the Turkish Basketbol Süper Ligi (BSL).

== Personal ==
Starks is the son of Anthony and Rae Starks, and has a brother, Renard, who attended Virginia Military Institute.

== Career statistics ==
Legend
GP	Games played	GS	Games started	MPG	Minutes per game
FG%	Field goal percentage	3P%	3-point field goal percentage	FT%	Free throw percentage
RPG	Rebounds per game	APG	Assists per game	SPG	Steals per game
BPG	Blocks per game	PPG	Points per game	**Bold**	Career high

=== College ===
Year	Team	GP	GS	MPG	FG%	3P%	FT%	RPG	APG	SPG	BPG	PPG
2010–11	Georgetown	30	0	9.7	.283	.257	.600	.6	.7	.3	.0	1.5
2011–12	Georgetown	31	25	24.4	.455	.367	.697	1.6	1.6	.6	**.1**	7.1
2012–13	Georgetown	32	31	34.1	**.457**	**.417**	.731	1.8	3.0	**1.3**	**.1**	12.8
2013–14	Georgetown	**33**	**33**	**37.0**	.412	.326	**.870**	**2.3**	**4.1**	.9	**.1**	**17.3**
Career		126	89	26.7	.427	.359	.813	1.6	2.4	.8	.1	9.9
