= Saint-Ange Vebobe =

French basketball player (1953–2022)

Personal information
- Born: 6 July 1953
- Died: 4 September 2022 (aged 69)
- Listed height: 6 ft 6 in (1.98 m)

Career information
- Playing career: 1970–1990
- Position: Small forward

Career history
- 1970–1975: JA Vichy
- 1975–1977: Clermont
- 1977–1982: Antibes
- 1982–1985: ASVEL Villeurbaunne
- 1985–1986: Caen
- 1986–1988: JA Vichy
- 1988–1990: ES Avignon

Saint-Ange Vebobe (6 July 1953 – 4 September 2022) was a French basketball player who played as a small forward.

== Biography ==
Vebobe played for the France national team from 1973 to 1985, playing in 76 games. He was the father of Luc-Arthur Vebobe.
