= Gulam Abbas Moontasir =

Indian basketball player (1942–2022)

Personal information
- Born: 7 January 1942 Bombay, Bombay Province, British India
- Died: 15 November 2022 (aged 80) Mumbai, Maharashtra, India

Career information
- College: Bombay University

Career highlights
- Arjuna Award (1970)

Gulam Abbas Moontasir (7 January 1942 – 15 November 2022) was an Indian professional basketball player.

== Early life ==
Born in Mumbai, he was introduced to basketball by an American missionary at the age of nine at the courts at Nagpada in central Mumbai. He studied at Mumbai's Antonio D'Souza School and D.G. Ruparel College.

== Career ==
Moontasir played for his school, college, Bombay University and the Maharashtra State, in turn. He made his international debut in an exhibition match against Australia in Mumbai in 1960. He represented India in the quadrangular in Colombo in 1964 and captained the Indian side in the Asian Basketball Championship held in Bangkok in 1969 and 1975. Moontasir was also member of the Indian team that participated in the 1970 Asian Games in Bangkok and took part in the 10th Anniversary confederation Tournament in Manila. He was chosen for the Asian All-Star team in 1970.

By the age of 22, Moontasir had become the top player in the country's history. On international tours, he learned of different styles of play and recognized how the game needed to be played in order for India to compete internationally. He identified three main problems: a stilted, outdated method of play, "ridiculous" refereeing, in which the referees officiated from their seats on the sidelines, and constant bickering by the governing authorities of the BFI. His attempts to bring the game forward were not well received by the authorities, who suspended him for three years.

In 1970, he became the first Indian basketball player to receive the Arjuna Award in 1970 for his achievement in national sport. He played his last national level match at the age of 44 when he represented the Railways in the Federation Cup in 1986.

Moontasir also authored the book Principles of Basketball.

== Films ==
Moontasir also played a role in several movies, including the 1981 film Khoon Ki Takkar and in the 1986 film Aashiana.
