= Claude Peter =

French basketball player (1947–2022)

Personal information
- Born: 19 December 1947 France
- Died: 11 May 2022 (aged 74) France
- Listed height: 6 ft 3 in (1.91 m)

Career information
- Playing career: 1965–1980
- Position: Point guard

Career history
- 1965–1966: FC Mulhouse Basket
- 1966–1980: Le Mans Sarthe Basket

Claude Peter (19 December 1947 – 11 May 2022) was a French basketball player who played as a point guard. He played one season for FC Mulhouse Basket before finishing fourteen seasons with Le Mans Sarthe Basket. He played in 50 games for the French national team.
