= Algis Ignatavicius =

Australian basketball player (1932–2022)

Personal information
- Nationality: Australian
- Born: Algimantas Ignatavičius; 11 October 1932 Kaunas, Lithuania
- Died: 16 May 2022 (aged 89)

Sport
- Sport: Basketball

Algimantas "Algis" Ignatavicius (11 October 1932 – 16 May 2022) was an Australian basketball player of Lithuanian origin. He competed in the men's tournament at the 1956 Summer Olympics.
