= Urbano Zea (basketball) =

Mexican basketball player (1941–2022)

Personal information
- Birth name: Urbano Zea Salcido
- Born: 6 August 1941; Ciudad Juárez, Mexico
- Died: 30 March 2022 (aged 80); El Paso, Texas, U.S.

Sport
- Sport: Basketball

Urbano Zea Salcido (6 August 1941 – 30 March 2022) was a Mexican basketball player. He competed in the men's tournament at the 1960 Summer Olympics.
