= Celso Scarpini =

Brazilian basketball player (1944–2022)

Personal information
- Born: 27 November 1944; Porto Alegre, Brazil
- Died: 23 September 2022 (aged 77); Porto Alegre, Brazil

Sport
- Sport: Basketball

Celso Luiz Scarpini (27 November 1944 – 23 September 2022) was a Brazilian basketball player. He competed in the men's tournament at the 1968 Summer Olympics.
