= Galatasaray (disambiguation) =

Galatasaray may refer to:

- Galatasaray S.K., a Turkish sports club based in Istanbul
  - Galatasaray S.K. (football)
  - Galatasaray S.K. (men's basketball)
  - Galatasaray S.K. (wheelchair basketball)
  - Galatasaray S.K. (women's basketball)
  - Galatasaray S.K. (Superleague Formula team)
  - Galatasaray S.K. (men's volleyball)
  - Galatasaray S.K. (women's volleyball)
- Galatasaray High School, a high school in Istanbul which gave its name to the sports club
- Galatasaray University, a university in Istanbul
- Galatasaray Islet, a small island on the Bosphorus
- Galatasaray Museum, the museum of Galatasaray Community
- Galatasaray (district), a district and a square in Istanbul

== See also ==
- Galatasaray TV, official sports channel of Galatasaray S.K.
- Galatasaray Magazine, official sports magazine of Galatasaray S.K.
- Galatasaray Store, official store of Galatasaray S.K.
- Galata, a district in Istanbul
- Galata Tower, a medieval tower located in that district
- Galata Bridge, a medieval stone tower in the Galata
