= 2021–22 Galatasaray S.K. (wheelchair basketball) season =

Turkish basketball season

Galatasaray Tunç Holding
2021–22 season
- President: Burak Elmas (until 11 June 2022); Dursun Özbek (from 11 June 2022)
- Head coach: Remzi Sedat İncesu
- Arena: Beylikdüzü Spor Kompleksi
- Turkish Wheelchair Basketball Super League: 4th seed
- Playoffs: 4th

2021–22 Galatasaray SK Wheelchair Basketball Season is the 2021–2022 basketball season for Turkish professional basketball club Galatasaray.

== Sponsorship and kit manufacturers ==
- Supplier: Galatasaray Store
- Main sponsor: Tunç Holding
- Back sponsor: —
- Sleeve sponsor: —
- Short sponsor: —
- Socks sponsor: —

== Team ==
=== Players ===
As of 23 January 2022

No.	Nationality	Player	Date of birth and age	Class.	Pos.
2	Turkey	Hüseyin Avni Dalman	March 20, 1994 (age 31)	2.0	Forward
7	Turkey	Bülent Yılmaz	March 2, 1979 (age 46)	3.5	Forward
8	Turkey	Maşide Cesur	August 18, 1990 (age 35)	1.0	Forward
9	Turkey	Uğur Toprak	July 19, 1992 (age 33)	3.0	Forward
10	Turkey	Enes Bulut	February 7, 2001 (age 24)	4.0	Guard
11	Turkey	Fikri Gündoğdu	November 28, 1985 (age 40)	1.0	Forward
14	Turkey	Mücahit Günaydın	March 25, 1999 (age 26)	4.0	Forward
24	Turkey	Deniz Acar	January 9, 1976 (age 49)	2.5	Forward
30	Turkey	Mustafa Muhittinoğlu	January 15, 1993 (age 32)	4.0	Forward
90	Turkey	Buğra Ergun	May 24, 2006 (age 19)	2.0	Forward

=== Squad changes ===
==== Out ====
No.	Pos.	Nat.	Name	Age	Moving to		Type	Transfer fee	Date	Source
10	G	(Turkey)	İsmail Ar	35	Fenerbahçe	(Turkey)	End of contract	Free	4 August 2021	
5	F	(Turkey)	Özgür Gürbulak	40	Gazişehir Gaziantep	(Turkey)	End of contract	Free	24 September 2021	

=== Staff and management ===
As of 19 January 2022

Name	Job
Remzi Sedat İncesu	Head Coach
Barış Ova	Physiotherapist
Akın Göl	Mechanician

== Competitions ==
=== Overview ===
Competition	First match	Last match	Starting round	Final position	Record							
Competition	First match	Last match	Starting round	Final position	Pld	W	D	L	PF	PA	PD	Win %
Turkish Wheelchair Basketball Super League	30 October 2021	28 June 2022	Regular season	4th	36	27	0	9	2,561	1,965	+596	75.00
Total					36	27	0	9	2,561	1,965	+596	75.00

Last updated: 28 June 2022
Source: Competitions

=== Turkish Wheelchair Basketball Super League ===
==== League table ====
Pos	Team	Pld	W	L	PF	PA	PD	Pts	Qualification or relegation
1	Fenerbahçe	30	30	0	2615	1614	+1001	60	Qualification to playoffs
2	Beşiktaş	30	25	5	2198	1634	+564	55	Qualification to playoffs
3	Gazişehir Gaziantep	30	24	6	2349	1672	+677	54	Qualification to playoffs
4	Galatasaray Tunç Holding	30	24	6	2187	1604	+583	54	Qualification to playoffs
5	İzmir Büyükşehir Belediyesi Gençlik ve Spor Kulübü	30	24	6	2087	1578	+509	54	Qualification to playoffs
6	Balıkesir Büyükşehir Belediyesi	30	20	10	2004	1693	+311	50	Qualification to playoffs
7	Şanlıurfa Büyükşehir Belediyespor	30	16	14	2001	2102	−101	46	Qualification to playoffs
8	Bağcılar Engelliler Gençlik ve Spor Kulübü	30	16	14	1941	1902	+39	46	Qualification to playoffs
9	Pendik Belediyesi Engelliler Spor Kulübü	30	15	15	2050	1971	+79	45	
10	TSK Rehabilitasyon Merkezi Engelliler Spor Kulübü	30	12	18	1797	1967	−170	42	
11	Ceylanpınar Bedensel Engelliler Spor Kulübü	30	11	19	1891	2038	−147	41	
12	Yalova Ortopedikler Spor Kulübü	30	9	21	1723	2072	−349	39	
13	Bursa Bedensel Engelliler Spor Kulübü	30	7	23	1753	2280	−527	37	Relegation to TSB League 1
14	KKTC Tekerlekli Sandalye Basketbol Takımı	30	4	26	1642	2305	−663	34	Relegation to TSB League 1
15	FuzulEv 1453 Engelliler Spor Kulübü	30	3	27	1419	2227	−808	33	Relegation to TSB League 1
16	Antalya Büyükşehir Belediyesi ASAT Gençlik ve Spor Kulübü	30	0	30	1441	2439	−998	30	Relegation to TSB League 1

Updated to match(es) played on 1 June 2022. Source: TBESF.org.tr

==== Results summary ====
Overall						Home					Away				
Pld	W	L	PF	PA	PD	W	L	PF	PA	PD	W	L	PF	PA	PD
30	24	6	2187	1604	+583	13	2	1058	725	+333	11	4	1129	879	+250

Last updated: 1 June 2022.
Source: TBESF.org.tr

==== Results by round ====
Round	1	2	3	4	5	6	7	8	9	10	11	12	13	14	15	16	17	18	19	20	21	22	23	24	25	26	27	28	29	30
Ground	H	A	H	A	A	H	A	H	A	H	A	H	A	H	A	A	H	A	H	H	A	H	A	H	A	H	A	H	A	H
Result	W	L	W	W	W	W	W	W	W	W	L	W	L	W	L	W	L	W	L	W	W	W	W	W	W	W	W	W	W	W
Position	7	9	9	5	4	4	4	3	3	3	3	3	3	5	4	4	4	4	4	5	5	5	5	5	5	4	4	4	4	4

Updated to match(es) played on 1 June 2022. Source: TBESF.org.tr
A = Away; H = Home; W = Win; L = Loss

==== Matches ====
Win Loss

Note: All times are TRT (UTC+3) as listed by the Turkish Physically Handicapped Sports Federation.

30 October 2021 1	Galatasaray Tunç Holding	57–48	KKTC Tekerlekli Sandalye Basketbol Takımı	Beylikdüzü, Istanbul
14:30	Scoring by quarter: 19–4, 18–4, 8–20, 12–20
	Pts: Muhittinoğlu 14	Boxscore	Pts: Ekşi 28	Arena: Beylikdüzü Spor Kompleksi

8 November 2021 2	Fenerbahçe	79–73(OT)	Galatasaray Tunç Holding	Fatih, Istanbul
13:15	Scoring by quarter: 19–17, 16–20, 21–14, 15–20, Overtime: 8–2
		Boxscore	Pts: Bulut 22	Arena: İBB Fatih Spor Kompleksi

13 November 2021 3	Galatasaray Tunç Holding	75–46	TSK Rehabilitasyon Merkezi Engelliler Spor Kulübü	Bahçelievler, Istanbul
13:00	Scoring by quarter: 13–9, 22–8, 23–16, 17–13
	Pts: Yılmaz 23	Boxscore		Arena: Bahçelievler Engelliler Spor Salonu

20 November 2021 4	Beşiktaş	61–77	Galatasaray Tunç Holding	Beşiktaş, Istanbul
20:00	Scoring by quarter: 17–16, 12–19, 16–24, 16–18
	Pts: Gezinci 19	Boxscore	Pts: Toprak 38	Arena: Süleyman Seba Spor Salonu

21 December 2021 5	Pendik Belediyesi Engelliler Spor Kulübü	64–67	Galatasaray Tunç Holding	Pendik, Istanbul
14:00	Scoring by quarter: 19–20, 14–18, 15–19, 16–10
	Pts: Bigdeli 17	Boxscore	Pts: Yılmaz 24	Arena: Pendik Kurtköy Spor Kompleksi

18 December 2021 6	Galatasaray Tunç Holding	85–33	Antalya Büyükşehir Belediyesi ASAT Gençlik ve Spor Kulübü	Beylikdüzü, Istanbul
14:30	Scoring by quarter: 26–8, 33–11, 12–8, 14–6
		Boxscore		Arena: Beylikdüzü Spor Kompleksi

25 December 2021 7	Balıkesir Büyükşehir Belediyesi	53–73	Galatasaray Tunç Holding	Balıkesir
16:00	Scoring by quarter: 14–15, 18–22, 7–13, 14–23
	Pts: Abbasishotoryeh 16	Boxscore	Pts: Bulut 36	Arena: Alparslan Türkeş Spor Kompleksi

30 December 2021 8	Galatasaray Tunç Holding	94–40	FuzulEv 1453 Engelliler Spor Kulübü	Beylikdüzü, Istanbul
14:30	Scoring by quarter: 23–9, 27–7, 23–9, 21–15
	Pts: Bulut 23	Boxscore	Pts: Ekinci 20	Arena: Beylikdüzü Spor Kompleksi

5 January 2022 9	Bursa Bedensel Engelliler Spor Kulübü	59–94	Galatasaray Tunç Holding	Bursa
14:00	Scoring by quarter: 16–27, 14–24, 21–20, 8–23
	Pts: Çokadar 30	Boxscore	Pts: Bulut 26	Arena: Vakıf Bera Spor Salonu

8 January 2022 10	Galatasaray Tunç Holding	98–44	Şanlıurfa Büyükşehir Belediyespor	Beylikdüzü, Istanbul
15:00	Scoring by quarter: 22–14, 27–8, 32–12, 17–10
	Pts: Toprak 27	Boxscore	Pts: Salmi 19	Arena: Beylikdüzü Spor Kompleksi

15 January 2022 11	İzmir Büyükşehir Belediyesi Gençlik ve Spor Kulübü	65–63	Galatasaray Tunç Holding	İzmir
14:00
	Pts: İpekişen 24	Boxscore		Arena: İzmir Celal Atik Spor Salonu

22 January 2022 12	Galatasaray Tunç Holding	74–48	Yalova Ortopedikler Spor Kulübü	Beylikdüzü, Istanbul
14:30	Scoring by quarter: 20–15, 20–13, 12–17, 22–3
	Pts: Bulut 33	Boxscore		Arena: Beylikdüzü Spor Kompleksi

23 February 2022 13	Bağcılar Engelliler Gençlik ve Spor Kulübü	65–60	Galatasaray Tunç Holding	Bağcılar, Istanbul
14:00	Scoring by quarter: 18–16, 18–8, 14–15, 15–21
Galatasaray TV	Pts: Öksüz 22	Boxscore	Pts: Bulut 28	Arena: Bağcılar Göztepe Spor Kompleksi

12 February 2022 14	Galatasaray Tunç Holding	64–41	Ceylanpınar Bedensel Engelliler Spor Kulübü	Beylikdüzü, Istanbul
14:30	Scoring by quarter: 25–10, 10–11, 14–6, 15–14
		Boxscore		Arena: Beylikdüzü Spor Kompleksi

17 February 2022 15	Gazişehir Gaziantep	78–55	Galatasaray Tunç Holding	Şahinbey, Gaziantep
13:00	Scoring by quarter: 20–14, 19–16, 21–16, 18–10
	Pts: Toptaş 32	Boxscore	Pts: Bulut 29	Arena: Talat Özkarslı Spor Salonu

5 March 2022 16	KKTC Tekerlekli Sandalye Basketbol Takımı	63–98	Galatasaray Tunç Holding
12:00
		Boxscore

20 March 2022 17	Galatasaray Tunç Holding	63–75	Fenerbahçe	Beylikdüzü, Istanbul
20:30	Scoring by quarter: 19–19, 12–19, 17–19, 15–18
		Boxscore		Arena: Beylikdüzü Spor Kompleksi

23 March 2022 18	TSK Rehabilitasyon Merkezi Engelliler Spor Kulübü	48–78	Galatasaray Tunç Holding	Ankara
14:00
		Boxscore		Arena: Gaziler Fizik Tedavi ve Rehabilitasyon

26 March 2022 19	Galatasaray Tunç Holding	49–54	Beşiktaş	Beylikdüzü, Istanbul
14:30	Scoring by quarter: 14–16, 12–13, 14–10, 9–15
		Boxscore		Arena: Beylikdüzü Spor Kompleksi

2 April 2022 20	Galatasaray Tunç Holding	66–53	Pendik Belediyesi Engelliler Spor Kulübü	Beylikdüzü, Istanbul
14:30	Scoring by quarter: 14–9, 21–17, 15–14, 16–13
		Boxscore		Arena: Beylikdüzü Spor Kompleksi

10 April 2022 21	Antalya Büyükşehir Belediyesi ASAT Gençlik ve Spor Kulübü	35–80	Galatasaray Tunç Holding	Kepez, Antalya
16:30
		Boxscore		Arena: Turgut Özal Spor Salonu

13 April 2022 22	Galatasaray Tunç Holding	55–48	Balıkesir Büyükşehir Belediyesi	Beylikdüzü, Istanbul
14:30	Scoring by quarter: 22–15, 4–12, 12–8, 17–13
Galatasaray TV	Pts: Muhittinoğlu 18	Boxscore		Arena: Beylikdüzü Spor Kompleksi

17 April 2022 23	FuzulEv 1453 Engelliler Spor Kulübü	43–67	Galatasaray Tunç Holding	Bahçelievler, Istanbul
14:00	Scoring by quarter: 8–10, 6–16, 11–18, 18–23
		Boxscore	Pts: Gültekin 14	Arena: Bahçelievler Engelliler Spor Salonu

26 April 2022 24	Galatasaray Tunç Holding	85–35	Bursa Bedensel Engelliler Spor Kulübü	Beylikdüzü, Istanbul
15:00	Scoring by quarter: 28–7, 18–16, 15–4, 24–8
Galatasaray TV	Pts: Bulut 18	Boxscore		Arena: Beylikdüzü Spor Kompleksi

5 May 2022 25	Şanlıurfa Büyükşehir Belediyespor	64–79	Galatasaray Tunç Holding	Urfa
13:00
		Boxscore		Arena: 11 Nisan Spor Salonu

10 May 2022 26	Galatasaray Tunç Holding	62–49	İzmir Büyükşehir Belediyesi Gençlik ve Spor Kulübü	Beylikdüzü, Istanbul
15:00	Scoring by quarter: 18–15, 11–11, 11–4, 22–19
	Pts: Günaydın 21	Boxscore		Arena: Beylikdüzü Spor Kompleksi

13 May 2022 27	Yalova Ortopedikler Spor Kulübü	51–74	Galatasaray Tunç Holding	Yalova
15:00
		Boxscore	Pts: Toprak 24	Arena: Yalova 90.Yıl Spor Salonu

20 May 2022 28	Galatasaray Tunç Holding	71–57	Bağcılar Engelliler Gençlik ve Spor Kulübü	Istanbul
13:00	Scoring by quarter: 18–10, 15–19, 17–16, 21–12
Galatasaray TV	Pts: Bulut 30	Boxscore		Arena: Feyziye Mektepleri Vakfı Işık Okulları Ayazağa Kampüsü Dr. Özge Sezerman Spor Salonu

25 May 2022 29	Ceylanpınar Bedensel Engelliler Spor Kulübü	51–91	Galatasaray Tunç Holding	Urfa
13:00
		Boxscore	Pts: Gültekin 22

1 June 2022 30	Galatasaray Tunç Holding	60–54	Gazişehir Gaziantep	Beylikdüzü, Istanbul
14:00	Scoring by quarter: 19–13, 12–14, 18–16, 11–11
	Pts: Bulut 38	Boxscore		Arena: Beylikdüzü Spor Kompleksi

==== Playoffs ====
===== Quarterfinals =====
Win Loss

3 June 2022 1	Galatasaray Tunç Holding	69–50	İzmir Büyükşehir Belediyesi Gençlik ve Spor Kulübü	Yalova
18:00
	Pts: Bulut 33	Boxscore	Pts: Efetürk 20	Arena: Yalova 90. Yıl Spor Salonu

4 June 2022 2	İzmir Büyükşehir Belediyesi Gençlik ve Spor Kulübü	55–72	Galatasaray Tunç Holding	Yalova
15:00
	Pts: Şahin 21	Boxscore	Pts: Bulut 28	Arena: Yalova 90. Yıl Spor Salonu

===== Semifinals =====
Win Loss

25 June 2022 1	Fenerbahçe	60–66	Galatasaray Tunç Holding	Yalova
14:00	Scoring by quarter: 14–14, 18–23, 18–12, 10–17
		Boxscore	Pts: Bulut 35	Arena: Yalova 90. Yıl Spor Salonu

26 June 2022 2	Galatasaray Tunç Holding	50–64	Fenerbahçe	Yalova
16:00	Scoring by quarter: 7–16, 17–19, 12–16, 14–13
Galatasaray TV	Pts: Toprak 16	Boxscore		Arena: Yalova 90. Yıl Spor Salonu

27 June 2022 3	Fenerbahçe	63–55	Galatasaray Tunç Holding	Yalova
14:00	Scoring by quarter: 19–11, 12–21, 15–12, 17–11
Galatasaray TV		Boxscore	Pts: Toprak 22	Arena: Yalova 90. Yıl Spor Salonu

===== 3–4th place =====
Win Loss

28 June 2022 1	Beşiktaş	69–62	Galatasaray Tunç Holding	Yalova
15:30	Scoring by quarter: 16–10, 15–15, 16–20, 22–17
		Boxscore	Pts: Bulut 30	Arena: Yalova 90. Yıl Spor Salonu
