= Ecem Güzel =

Turkish sailor (born 1995)

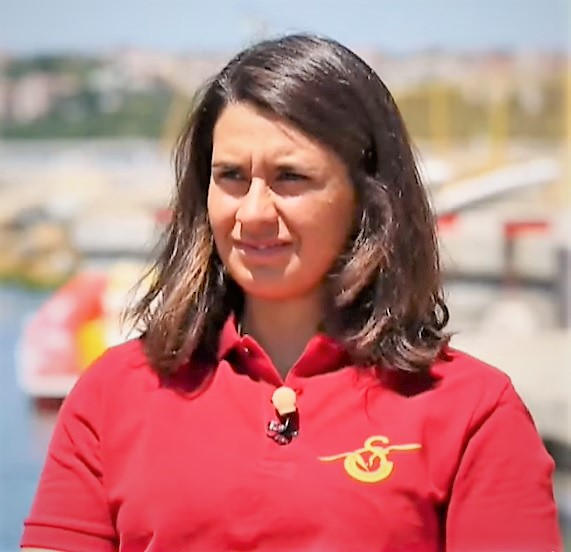
- Güzel interviewed in 2019 on beIN Sports

Personal information
- Nationality: Turkish
- Born: 23 February 1995 (age 31) Pendik, Istanbul, Turkey

Sailing career
- Sport: Sailing
- Class: Laser Radial
Medal record
Sailing
Representing Turkey
Mediterranean Games
Bronze medal – third place	2022 Oran	Laser Radial

Ecem Güzel (born 23 February 1995) is a Turkish sailor who specializes in the Laser Radial class. She is a member of the Galatasaray Sailing team. Güzel competed at the 2020 Summer Olympic Games for Turkey.

== Sports career ==
Güzel became interested in sailing at age 10 during a summer vacation in Bodrum, on the Turkish Riviera. She attended a sailing course; her mother had to obtain a loan to cover Güzel's training expenses. She learned that the Optimist dinghy is designed for young people and started sailing in that class because of her young age. She gained experience at the Era Yachting Bodrum club.

=== Turgutreis Belediyespor ===
Güzel joined Turgutreis Belediyespor, a local club in Bodrum, and began to compete there in 2009. She chose the Laser Radial as it is an Olympics sailing class. Güzel debuted internationally at the 2009 Laser Europa Cup held in Scarlino, Italy, in her second or third regatta.

=== Galatasaray Sailing ===
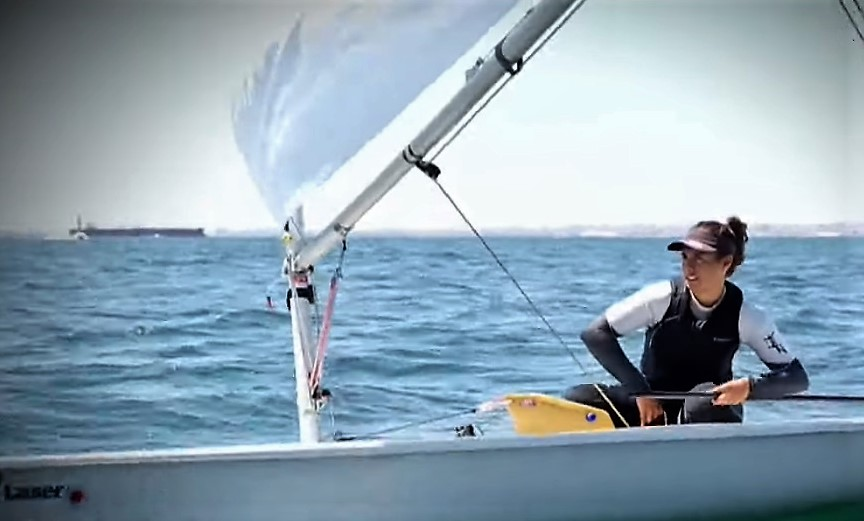
Güzel sailing in 2019, beIN Sports image

Taking notice of Güzel's passion at international competitions, the Istanbul-based club Galatasaray Sailing transferred her from Bodrum in 2013.

In 2013, Güzel was silver medalist at the 46th Balkan Sailing Championship held in Ohrid, North Macedonia. She placed second at the Athens Eurolymp Week in March 2014. In July, Güzel ranked ninth at the Laser Standard & Radial – European Youth Championship in Nago–Torbole, Italy and in August ranked sixth at the Laser Radial & Standard – U21 World Championship in Douarnenez, France. Güzel won a gold medal in the Laser Radial class at the 47th Balkan Sailing Championship in Constanța, Romania, in September 2014 and in December placed seventh at the ISAF Sailing World Cup Melbourne in Australia. In September 2016, Güzel won a gold medal at the 49th Balkan and Open Sailing Championship in Greece. At the 2017 Laser Radial World Championships, she placed 37th. Güzel ranked eighth at the 2018 Mediterranean Games in Tarragona, Spain.

Despite being unsuccessful at the 2018 Sailing World Championships, Güzel finished in 10th place at the 2019 Women's Laser Radial World Championship held in Sakaiminato, Japan, qualifying her to compete at the 2020 Summer Olympics. She took the bronze medal in the Laser Radial class at the Coaches-Pre-WM-Regatta competition held in Melbourne, Australia. At the 2020 Women's Laser Radial World Championship in Melbourne, Güzel placed 29th.

The Turk-Nippon Insurance Company announced that it will sponsor Güzel for the 2020 Summer Olympics.

At the 2024 Women's ILCA 6 World Championship in Mar del Plata, Argentina, she competed in the Golden Group, and ranked 39th collecting 289 points. That result was sufficient to secure the first spot for Turkey in the sailing sport at the 2024 Summer Olympics.

== Personal life ==
Güzel was born on 23 February 1995 in Pendik, Istanbul, and grew up in Bodrum. She is a student of sports administration at Marmara University. Her mother, Alev Özdinçer, is a financial adviser and sailing referee.
