= Sedef Çakmak =

Turkish politician and LGBT rights activist

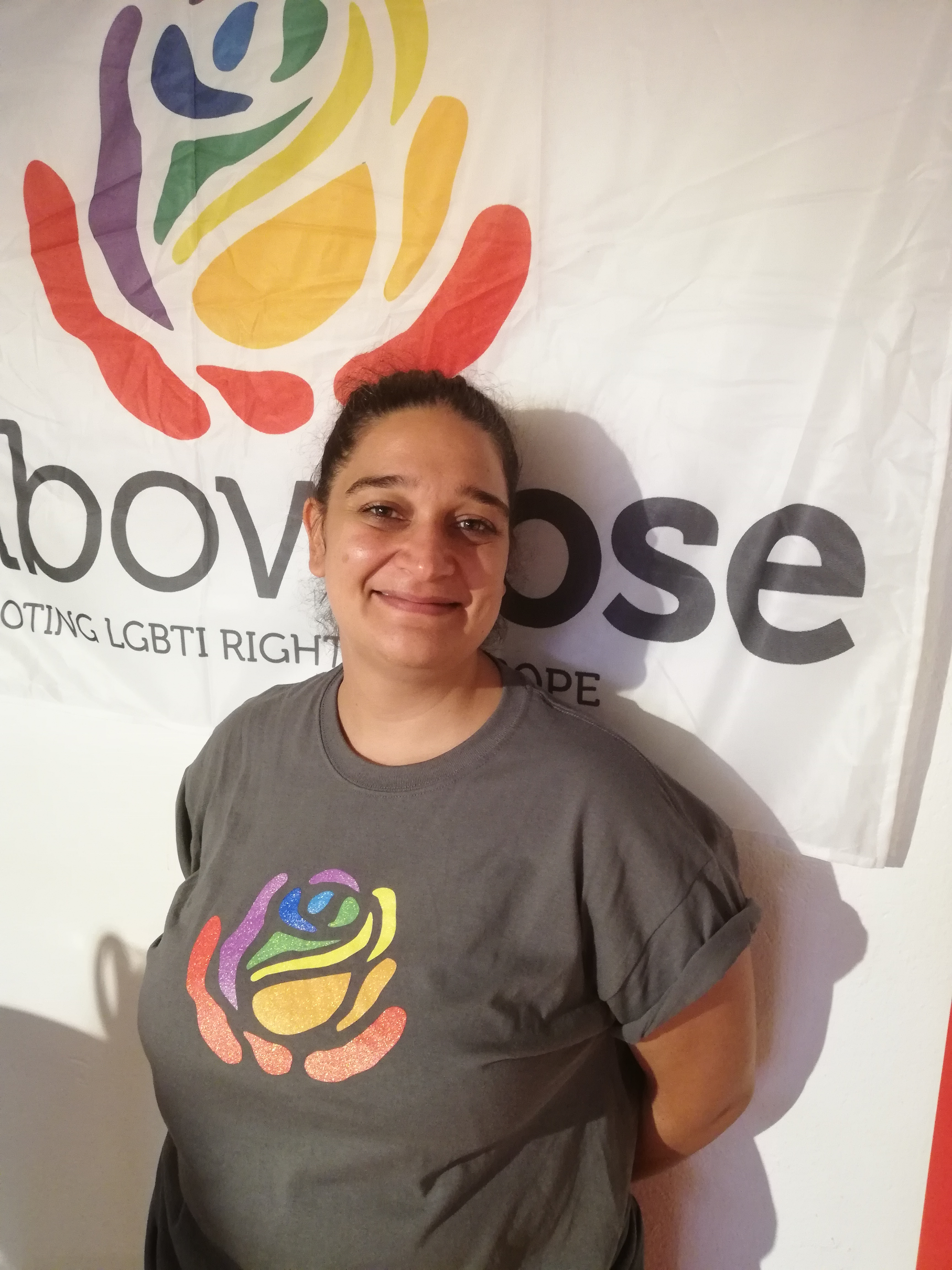

City Council Member of Beşiktaş, Istanbul
- Incumbent
- Assumed office 2 March 2015

Personal details
- Born: 9 June 1982 (age 44)
- Party: Republican People's Party
- Education: Galatasaray University

Sedef Çakmak (born 9 June 1982) is a Turkish politician and LGBT rights activist. She was the first openly homosexual person to be elected into office in Turkey.

== Career ==
She grew up in Ankara. Çakmak graduated from Galatasaray University with a Bachelor's degree in Sociology.

She has been active in the Turkish LGBT movement since the 2000s. In 2004, she contacted Lambda Istanbul to write a paper for university about LGBT issues in Turkey and through being in contact with other LGBT people, she became aware of her own lesbian identity. Afterwards, she became active in Lambda Istanbul and was a member of their International Relations Commission and their Academical Research Commission. From 2011 to 2013, she co-founded and was the chair of the organisation SPoD LGBTI.

In the 2014 local elections for the city council of Beşiktaş, she ran for office for the Republican People's Party, not disclosing her lesbian sexual orientation and was elected. She accepted her mandate on 2 March 2015. Before that, she had been an advisor to the mayor of Beşiktaş in LGBT issues.

In October 2017, she became the chairwoman of the board of Rainbow Rose, a network of LGBT platforms within the Party of European Socialists.
