= Galatasaray Bridge Team =

Bridge section of Galatasaray S.K.

Galatasaray
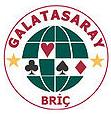
- Founded: 1997
- League: Turkey Contract Bridge Championship
- Based in: İstanbul, Turkey
- Arena: Galatasaray Beyoğlu Hasnun Galip Club Administrative Center
- Colors: Yellow & Red
- President: Dursun Özbek
- Head coach: Ö.Cavit Turan
- Championships: 2
- Mascot: Lion
- Website: http://www.galatasaray.org/amator/bric/

Galatasaray Bridge Team is the bridge section of Galatasaray S.K., a major sports club in Istanbul, Turkey.

== Honours ==
=== Turkish Championship ===
- Winner (3): 1999, 2000, 2009 as a team
- Runners-Up (1): 2009
- Third: 2006
- Third: 2007
- Third: 2008
- Winner: 2009 Nevzat Aydoğdu and Fikret Aydoğdu as a couple
- Winner: 2010 Dilek Yavaş and Serap Kuranoğlu as a couple

=== İstanbul Championship ===
- Winner (2): 2007 as a couple M. Ali İnce and Namık Kökten, 2011 as a team

Women's

- Winner (3): 2011, 2012, 2013

=== European Championship ===
- Winner (2): 2008, 2011 as a team
