= Galatasaray SK Marşı =

1980 song

Galatasaray Marşı ("Galatasaray March") is the official hymn of the Turkish multisport club Galatasaray SK. It was commissioned in 1980 to celebrate the club's 75th anniversary. The words were written by Turkish songwriter Mehmet Faruk Gürtunca and Selmi Andak is the composer. The re re re, ra ra ra, Galatasaray Galatasaray cimbom bom part is a famous fan chant and was sung for the first time by Galatasaray fans at Taksim Stadium in 1922. The first march was written by Ahmet Malik, who was a student at Galatasaray High School in 1912. This was the first club march of Turkey, written in both Arabic and French and published in Egypt.

== Lyrics ==
Galatasaray ruhumuz tek burcumuz. (Galatasaray, our soul, our only bastion)
Ali Sami Yen ölümsüz kurucumuz. (Ali Sami Yen, our eternal founder)
Kültür simgesi Galatasaray, (The embodiment of culture, Galatasaray)
Sporun beşiği Galatasaray. (The cradle of sports, Galatasaray)

Sarı kırmızı gönlümüzde ideal. (Yellow and red, the ideal in our hearts)
Spor kollarında tükenmeyen bir moral. (A morale that doesn't come to an end, in all branches)
Kalplerde yıldız göklerde bir ay, (The star in hearts, a moon in the skies)
sporun beşiği Galatasaray. (The cradle of sports, Galatasaray)

re re re, ra ra ra, Galatasaray Galatasaray cimbom bom(x2)

Her dalda nice kupalar. (Heaps of trophies, in all branches)
Son hedef şampiyonluklar. (And always the final target, to become champions)
Her kolda yarışmamız var. (We tussle, in all branches)
Zaferlere kavuşmamız var. (And all the victories, there to be reached)

re re re, ra ra ra, Galatasaray Galatasaray cimbom bom(x2)

Galatasaray ruhumuz tek burcumuz.
Ali Sami Yen ölümsüz kurucumuz.
Kültür simgesi Galatasaray,
Sporun beşiği Galatasaray.

re re re, ra ra ra, Galatasaray Galatasaray cimbom bom(x2)

Her dalda nice kupalar.
Son hedef şampiyonluklar.
Her kolda yarışmamız var.
Zaferlere kavuşmamız var.

re re re, ra ra ra, Galatasaray Galatasaray cimbom bom(x2)
