= Galatasaray Islet =

Island in Turkey

- Private
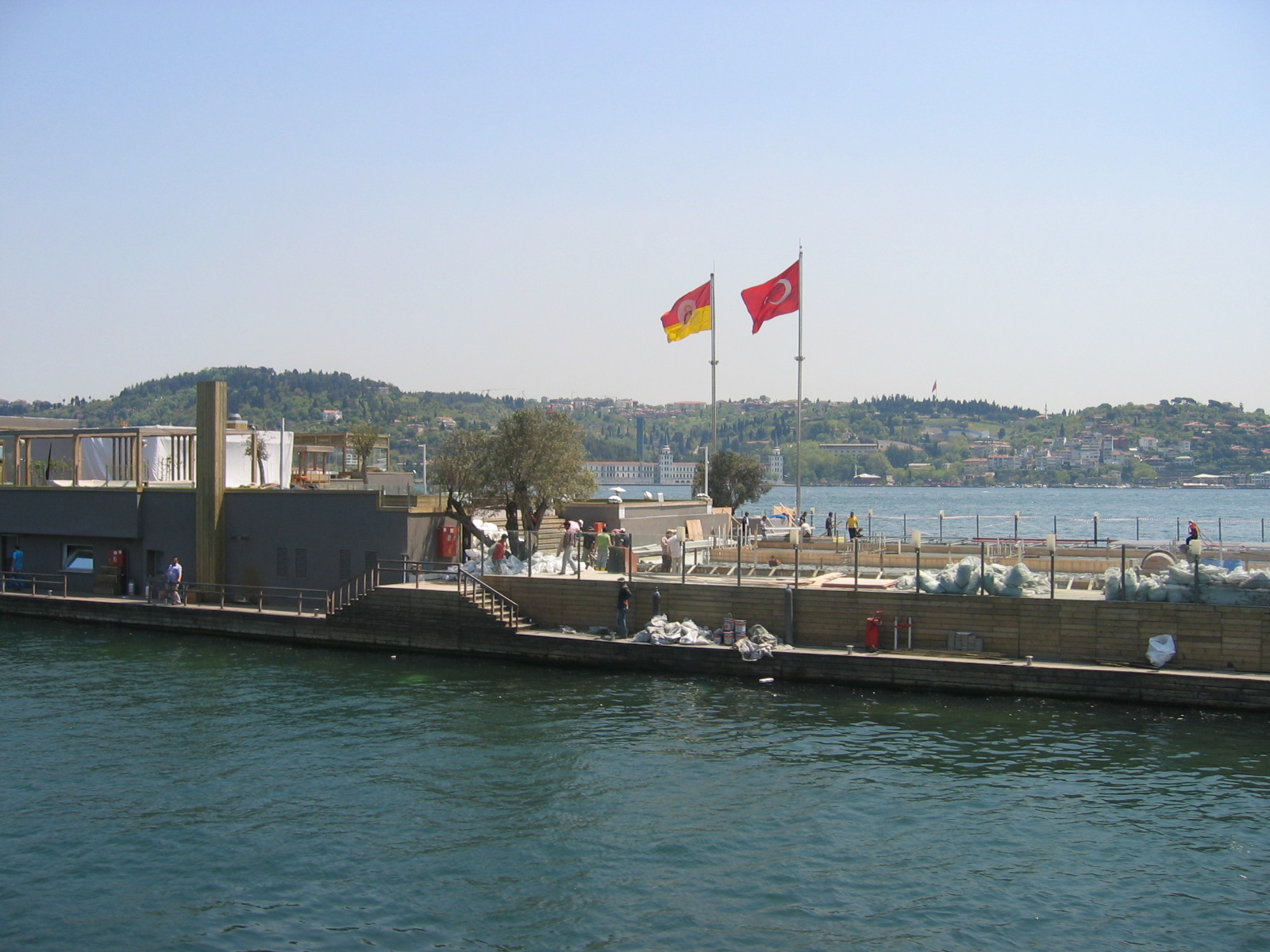
- Galatasaray Islet

- Location within Turkey
- Coordinates: 41°03′35.06″N 29°2′22.48″E
- Country: Turkey
- Province: Istanbul

Population
  - Total: None
- Time zone: UTC+3 (TRT)
- Website: www.galatasaray.org

The Galatasaray Islet (Turkish: Galatasaray Adası) is a small island on the Bosphorus strait off Kuruçeşme neighbourhood in Istanbul, Turkey, partially owned by Galatasaray Sports Club.

Being situated just north of the Bosphorus Bridge, it's only accessible to Galatasaray members and their guests. Only 165 m (541 ft) from the European coast, the islet is reachable by free ferry service.

From Autumn 2002 to July 2007 Galatasaray Islet has undergone massive construction works, resulting in its transformation into the entertainment and recreation centre that is now serving the Galatasaray community and Istanbul. That same year the constructions had been finished, on 4 October 2007, a fire broke out in a kitchen chimney and burnt down two restaurants and damaged four other premises on the islet.

== History ==
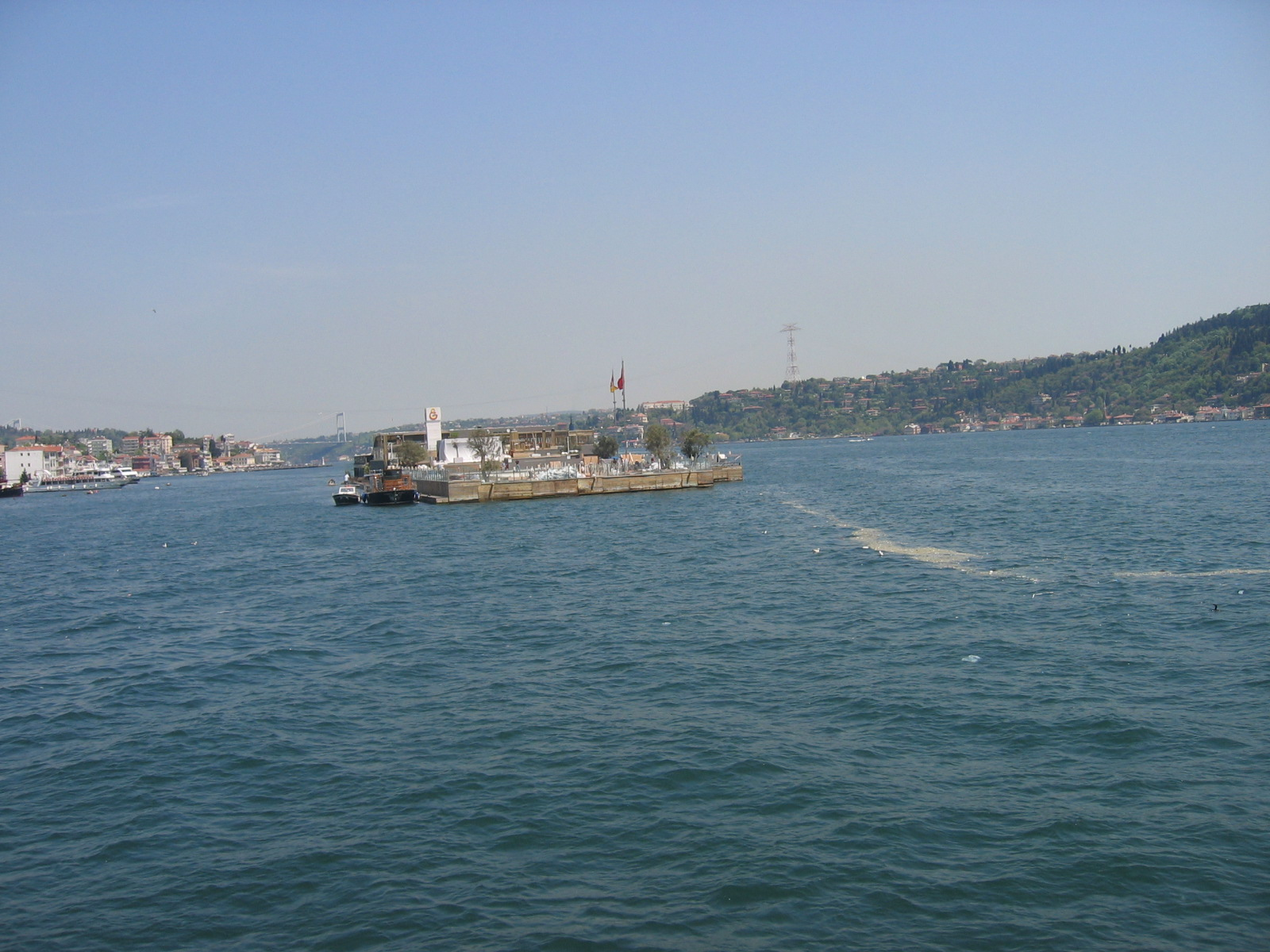
General view

In 1872, Ottoman sultan Abdülaziz (reigned 1861–1876) granted the islet to the Ottoman-Armenian court architect Sarkis Balyan (1835–1899), who erected a three-story house on it as his own residence. In 1874, during one of his several visits to Istanbul, Russian-Armenian painter Ivan Aivazovsky stayed in the mansion of Sarkis on the islet, and made here a number of paintings commissioned by the sultan for the Dolmabahçe Palace.

Called as the "Sarkis Bey Islet" during his lifetime, it was rented out by his legal heirs after the World War I to "Şirket-i Hayriye", the company operating passenger ferries in Istanbul, and was used for a long time as a coal depot.

In 1957, Galatasaray S.K. purchased the islet and constructed premises and sports facilities on it. The swimming pool on the islet served home to the water polo team from 1957 to 1968.
