= Fenerbahçe S.K. (wheelchair basketball) =

Fenerbahçe Wheelchair Basketball Team
- Leagues: Turkish Wheelchair Basketball Super League
- Founded: 1990 / 26 October 2021
- Arena: Metro Enerji Sports Hall
- Capacity: 2,500
- Location: Istanbul, Turkey
- Team colors: Yellow, navy blue
- President: Aziz Yıldırım
- Head coach: Can Aksu
- Championships: Turkish Super League (7); EuroCup 1 (2; EuroCup 2 (1); EuroCup 3 (1)
- Website: fenerbahce.org
Home

Fenerbahçe Wheelchair Basketball Team, also known as Fenerbahçe İstanbul Jet for sponsorship reasons, is the wheelchair basketball section of Fenerbahçe S.K., a major sports club in Istanbul, Turkey. Fenerbahçe play matches in 2,500-seat arena, called the Metro Enerji Sports Hall.

== History ==
Fenerbahçe Wheelchair Basketball Team, formerly known as 1907 Fenerbahçe Engelli Yıldızlar SK and earlier as İstanbul Engelli Yıldızlar Sports Club, is Turkey's first wheelchair basketball team. The club was founded in 1990 under the name İstanbul Sakatlar Sports Club in Istanbul. The team later changed its name to İstanbul Engelli Yıldızlar Sports Club and, due to various naming sponsorship agreements over the years, competed under the names Cadbury Kent Engelli Yıldızlar and subsequently Elig Avukatlık Bürosu Engelli Yıldızlar. After competing under the name İstanbul Engelli Yıldızlar Sports Club until the 2018–19 season, the team entered the following season in the Turkish Wheelchair Basketball Super League under the name 1907 Fenerbahçe Engelli Yıldızlar SK.

On 26 October 2021, following the transfer of 1907 Fenerbahçe Engelli Yıldızlar SK to Fenerbahçe Sports Club, the team adopted its current name, Fenerbahçe Wheelchair Basketball Team. The team currently competes in the Turkish Wheelchair Basketball Super League.

Under the name İstanbul Engelli Yıldızlar Sports Club, the team won the Turkish Wheelchair Basketball Super League championships in the 1998–99 and 1999–2000 seasons. Competing as 1907 Fenerbahçe Engelli Yıldızlar SK, it won the league title again in the 2018–19 season. In European competitions, the team finished as runners-up in the Willi Brinkmann Cup during the 2005–06 season and in the Andre Vergauwen Cup in the 2006–07 season, both under the İstanbul Engelli Yıldızlar Sports Club name. In the 2018–19 season, competing as 1907 Fenerbahçe Engelli Yıldızlar SK, the team won the EuroLeague 3 title. Later, in the 2022–23 season, the team then named Fenerbahçe Göksel Çelik Wheelchair Basketball Team, won the EuroCup 2 championship.

Prior to the 2021–22 season, following the transfer of 1907 Fenerbahçe Engelli Yıldızlar SK to Fenerbahçe Sports Club, the team continued its competitions under the name Fenerbahçe Wheelchair Basketball Team. Due to the COVID-19 pandemic, Turkish teams did not participate in European competitions that season. Fenerbahçe completed the regular season of the Turkish Wheelchair Basketball Super League undefeated as league leaders. In the playoff stage held in Yalova, the team defeated Bağcılar Engelliler GSK 2–0 in the quarterfinal series to advance to the semifinals. In the semifinals, Fenerbahçe overcame its long-time rival Galatasaray 2–1, and in the final series defeated Gazişehir Gaziantep 2–1 to secure the championship title.

Ahead of the 2022–23 season, a naming sponsorship agreement with Göksel Paslanmaz Çelik resulted in the team being renamed Fenerbahçe Göksel Çelik Wheelchair Basketball Team.

Before the 2024–25 season, a new naming sponsorship agreement with İstanbul Jet Havacılık led to the team adopting the name Fenerbahçe İstanbul Jet Wheelchair Basketball Team.

== Previous names ==
Period	Previous names
1990	İstanbul Sakatlar SK
2018	İstanbul Engelli Yıldızlar SK
2018–2021	1907 Fenerbahçe Engelli Yıldızlar SK
2021–2022	Fenerbahçe
2022–2024	Fenerbahçe Göksel Çelik
2024–present	Fenerbahçe İstanbul Jet

== Technical staff ==
As of 17 December 2025

Name	Position
(Turkey) Can Aksu	Head Coach
(Turkey) Ogün Karataş	Administrative Manager
(Turkey) Murat Bozoğlu	Finance Director
(Turkey) Mehmet Tosun	Physiotherapist
(Turkey) Mehmet Kara	Equipment Technician

== Current roster ==
As of 17 December 2025

Pos.	No.	Nat.	Player
C	3	(Turkey)	Baran Oğuz
F	7	(Turkey)	Ahmet Efetürk
F	8	(Turkey)	Ümit Bebe
G	9	(Turkey)	Uğur Toprak
G	11	(Turkey)	İbrahim Yavuz
F	12	(Turkey)	Mücahit Günaydın
C	13	(Iran)	Morteza Abedi
C	14	(Turkey)	Yamaç Yüksel
G	24	(Iran)	Mohammad Hassan Sayari
F	44	(Turkey)	Kinem Kulbay
F	55	(Turkey)	Murat Yazıcı
F	99	(Turkey)	Ahmet Sarıdağ

== Honours ==
=== Domestic competitions ===
- Turkish Wheelchair Basketball Super League:
  - Winners (7): 1998–99, 1999–00, 2018–19, 2021–22, 2022–23, 2023–24, 2025-26
  - Runners-up (1): 2024–25
  - Third place (1): 2020–21

=== International competitions ===
- EuroCup 1:
  - Winners (2): 2023–24, 2025–26
- EuroCup 2:
  - Winners (1): 2022–23
  - Runners-up (1): 2005–06
  - Third place (1): 2003–04
- EuroCup 3:
  - Winners (1): 2018–19
