= Galatasaray Küçükçekmece Rowing Center =

- Galatasaray Küçükçekmece Kürek Tesisleri
- Location in Istanbul
- Location: Küçükçekmece Lake, Istanbul, Turkey
- Coordinates: 41.0085°N 28.7200°E
- Owner: Galatasaray Sports Club
- Operator: Galatasaray Sports Club
- Type: Rowing facility

Galatasaray Küçükçekmece Rowing Center is a rowing training and competition complex located on the shores of Küçükçekmece Lake in Istanbul, Turkey. The facility serves as the base for Galatasaray Sports Club’s rowing branch, supporting both national competitions and training programs.

== Rowing ==
The facility is used for regular training sessions for the club’s rowing teams and hosts regattas and training camps for youth and senior athletes. Galatasaray rowing teams have participated in Turkish Rowing Federation events, with competitions and results documented in official league reports.

In 2025, Galatasaray teams competed in the Turkish Rowing League and Istanbul Regatta Series, using the Küçükçekmece facility as the primary base for on-water practice.

The complex includes boat storage, launching docks, and an on-shore training area, providing infrastructure for both competitive and recreational rowing.

== Youth Programs ==
The facility hosts youth rowing programs to develop athletes for national competitions. Training sessions include technique, endurance, and race preparation guided by certified coaches affiliated with Galatasaray Sports Club.
