= Galatasaray TV =

- Country: Turkey
- Broadcast area: Turkey
- Headquarters: Istanbul, Turkey

Programming
- Picture format: 576i (16:9 SDTV)

Ownership
- Owner: Galatasaray SK

History
- Launched: 2006

Links
- Website: http://www.galatasaray.com

Availability

Streaming media
- Mail2web: Galatasaray TV Online

Galatasaray TV (GSTV) is a channel of Turkish company Galatasaray S.K. The daily programs of this TV include live games (basketball, volleyball, water polo, equestrian, youth football teams, rowing and sailing) and learning cultural roots of Galatasaray (Galatasaray Lycée—Galatasaray Lisesi, Galatasaray Université—Galatasaray Üniversitesi, history of Galatasaray).

The channel first launched in January 2006 over satellite, now digital cable services are activated.

== Live transmissions ==
Galatasaray TV has a studio at Galatasaray's Türk Telekom Arena. Live transmissions happen on a weekly basis in the form of Matchnight Live and Live From Türk Telekom Arena. On 17 August 2010, GSTV announced that 3G Live Programs started. Fans are welcome to telephone into these shows for phone-in discussions. Also, most of the games played by clubs basketball and volleyball teams broadcast live.

== Content ==
The channel features:

- Replays of every Galatasaray SK match in all competitions, including post match coverage & analysis
- Exclusive interviews with staff and players
- Live news program
- Pre-match coverage of all Galatasaray games
- Live coverage of Galatasaray Reserves and first-team friendly matches
- Highlights of Galatasaray Football Academy and Galatasaray Basketball and Volleyball matches
- Galatasaray-related news
- Highlights of classic matches
- Documentaries based on the club's history

== Programs in Turkish ==
- Başkan’ın Ajandası - President's speech(weekly)
- Big Chief Tomas - Tomas Ujfalusi
- Gerçekleri Tarih Yazar - Documentary
- Aslan Yolu - Documentary
- Sarı mı Kırmızı mı - Contest
- Galatasaray’da Store Saati - GS Store, Veteran Players
- 5. Periyot - Basketball
- 24 Saniye - Basketball
- Filenin Yıldızları - Volleyball
- Avrupa’dan Futbol - European Football
- Fotoğrafların Dünyası
- Ünlüler Geçidi - Magazine
- Onların Dünyası - Magazine
- Yorum Farkı - Cross Talk
- Muhabir Kulisi - Press & Journalist
- Mekteb-i Sultani - Lycee de Galatasaray time
- Günaydın Cimbom - Morning program
- Ana Haber - News
- İyi Geceler Cimbom - Haber & Aktüalite - News & current events
- Parçalı Sevda - Supporters
- Serem’in Günlüğü
- On Numara
- Aslan Yuvası - Youth Teams
- Merak Edilenler
- Spor Kafe - Magazine

== Commentators/presenters ==
- Burcu Baber
- Melisa Çizmeci
- Kaan Karacan
- Cansu Şimşek
- Abdullah Şanlı
- Tuna Bayık
- Elif Kartal
- Murat Borlu
- Sertaç Karakuş

== Other Galatasaray media ==
As with other sports clubs, Galatasaray have their own media outlets to communicate official news and information to their supporters. These include:

- Club magazine, Galatasaray Magazine
- The Official Galatasaray Website
- Digital TV Channel, Galatasaray TV
- Cellular service provider, Galatasaray Mobile
- Galatasaray TV Online Website GSTV Online
