= Galatasaray Sailing =

Galatasaray
- Founded: 1910
- League: Turkey Sailing
- Based in: İstanbul, Turkey
- Arena: Galatasaray Kalamış Facilities
- Colors: Yellow & Red
- President: Dursun Özbek
- Head coach: Faik Camat
- Mascot: Lion
- Website: http://www.galatasaray.org/susporlari/yelken/

Galatasaray Sailing Team is the men's and women's sailing section of Galatasaray S.K., a major sports club in Istanbul, Turkey. There are optimist, finn, Laser Radial, Laser Standard, Mistral, Laser M and windsurf teams. In 2011, Galatasaray Windsurf Team won Turkish Windsurfing Championship Cup.

== Technical staff ==
Name	Nat.	Job
Melih Dilikoğlu	(Turkey)	Manager
İsmail Uzunlar	(Turkey)	Baş antrenör
Tugkan Kandemir	(Turkey)	Optimist Coach
Ferit Ercan	(Turkey)	Wind surf Trainer
Tora Kutoğlu	(Turkey)	Trainer
Ufuk Karadalga	(Turkey)	Trainer
Abdullah Baglıca	(Turkey)	Trainer
Caner Özkan	(Turkey)	Yacht Trainer
Ateş yiğin	(Turkey)	Trainer

== Honours ==
=== Optimist Class ===
- 2000 International GAP Cup Winner
- 2011 Naval Cup Runners-up, Haluk Çalın
- 2011 44.Balkan Championship (2.)Haluk Çalın
- 2012 Turkish Championship,(2.) Haluk Çalın

=== Finn Class ===
- 1969 Turkish Championship Winner-İstanbul Championship Winner
- 1970 Turkish Championship Winner-İstanbul Championship Winner
- 1971 Turkish Championship Winner-İstanbul Championship Winner
- 1972 Turkish Championship Winner-İstanbul Championship Winner
- 1973 Turkish Championship Winner-İstanbul Championship Winner
- 1974 Turkish Championship Winner-İstanbul Championship Winner
- 1975 Turkish Championship Winner-İstanbul Championship Winner
- 1998 Turkish Championship Winner
- 1999 İstanbul Championship Runners-Up
- 2001 İstanbul Championship Winner
- 2001 Turkish Championship (3.)
- 2001 İstanbul Championship (3.)
- 2002 İstanbul Championship (3.

=== 420 Class ===
- 2014 Turkish Championship (2.) Haluk Çalın & Alp Güçer
- 2015 Turkish Championship (2.) Haluk Çalın & Alp Güçer

=== Laser Radial Class ===
- 1998 İstanbul Championship Runners-Up
- 1998 Marmara Group Championship Winner
- 1998 Turkish Championship Winner
- 1998 Balkan Championship Runners-Up
- 1998 Balkan Championship Runners-Up
- 1998 European Cup 1. Elimination Winner
- 1998 European Cup 3. Elimination Winner
- 1998 European Cup 4. Elimination Winner
- 1998 European Cup 5. Elimination Winner
- 1998 European Championship Total Winner
- 1998 Naval Academy Cup Winner
- 1999 İstanbul Championship Winner
- 1999 Marmara Group Championship Winner
- 1999 Turkish Championship Winner
- 1999 Avrupa Şampiyonası Birincisi
- 2000 İstanbul Championship Winner
- 2000 European Championship Winner
- 2001 İstanbul Championship (3.)
- 2001 Turkish Championship Winner
- 2001 WorldCup Championship (4.)
- 2011 Naval Cup Runners-up, Mustafa Onur Durak

=== Laser Standard Class ===
- 1999 İstanbul Championship Winner
- 1999 Marmara Group Championship Winner
- 1999 Turkish Championship Winner
- 2001 Turkish Championship Runners-Up
- 2001 Federation Cup Winner

=== Mistral Olympic Class ===
- 1998 Marmara Group Championship Winner
- 1998 Balkan Championship Runners-Up
- 1998 Turkish Championship Winner
- 1998 Turkish Championship (3.)
- 1998 İstanbul Championship Runners-Up
- 1998 Balkan Championship (Youth) (3.)
- 1999 Balkan Championship Winner
- 1999 Turkish Championship Winner
- 2000 İstanbul Championship Winner
- 2000 Turkish Championship Winner
- 2000 2000 Olympics (31.)
- 2000 Turkish Youth Championship Winner
- 2000 Turkish Youth Championship Runners-Up
- 2000 İstanbul Youth Championship Winner
- 2000 İstanbul Youth Championship Runners-Up
- 2001 İstanbul Championship Winner
- 2001 Turkish Championship Winner
- 2001 Mediterranean Cup (4.)
- 2001 İstanbul Championship (3.)
- 2001 Turkish Championship (3.)
- 2001 İstanbul Youth Championship Winner
- 2001 Turkish Youth Championship Winner
- 2002 Turkish Championship Runners-Up
- 2002 Turkish Championship Winner

=== 1 M Class ===
- 2000 İstanbul Championship Runners-Up
- 2000 Turkish Championship Runners-Up
- 2001 İstanbul Championship Runners-Up
- 2001 Turkish Championship Runners-Up
- 2001 İstanbul Championship (3.)
- 2001 Turkish Championship Winner

=== Windsurf ===
- 2003 Turkish Championship Winner
- 2011 Turkish Championship Winner

==== Windsurf RSX ====
- 2011 Naval Cup Winner, Simla Çilingiroğlu
- 2011 Naval Cup Runners-up, Pamir Saçkan

==== Windsurf Techno293 U17 ====
- 2011 Naval Cup Winner, Seben Göle
- 2011 Naval Cup Runners-up, Simay Bengü

==== Windsurf Techno293 U15 ====
- 2011 Naval Cup Winner, Cavit Onur Biriz

=== Pirat Class ===
- 2011 Turkish Championship Winner, Çağlan Kuruner & Caner Erdem
- 2012 Turkish Championship Winner, Çağlan Kuruner & Caner Erdem
