= Galatasaray Community =

Turkish high school organization

- Galatasaray Community Cooperation Committee
- Formation: October 11, 1988; 38 years ago
- Type: Merged Organizations
- Legal status: Committee
- Headquarters: Istanbul, Turkey
- Location(s): Turkey; France; United Kingdom; United States; Germany; Monaco; Belgium; Switzerland; Austria
- Region served: Worldwide
- Services: Education; Foundation; Donation; Sports
- Members: 24 organizations
- Official language: Turkish; French; English
- Main organ: Galatasaray High School
- Website: www.gsisbirligi.org

Galatasaray Community Official Logo

Galatasaray Community (Turkish: Galatasaray Topluluğu) is the organization of Galatasaray institutions which were derived from Galatasaray High School, which cooperate under the one umbrella. It was established on 11 October 1988, when the organization was created under the protocol purposes and internal regulations were published on this date. Board meetings are held every two months.

Domestic and international alumni associations, and Galatasaray High School, Galatasaray University, Galatasaray Sports Club, Galatasaray Educational Foundation, Galatasaray Mutual Assistance Foundation, and Galatasaray Primary School form the Galatasaray Community Cooperation Committee, which consists of 24 organizations.

== Organizations ==
| Name | Country | Founded |
|---|---|---|
| Galatasaray High School | Turkey | 1481 |
| Galatasaray Sports Club | Turkey | 1905 |
| Galatasaray Alumni Association | Turkey | 1908 |
| Galatasaray Alumni Union | Turkey | 1937 |
| İzmir Galatasaray Alumni Association | Turkey | 1965 |
| Bursa Galatasaray Alumni Association | Turkey | 1975 |
| Galatasaray Mutual Assistance Foundation | Turkey | 1977 |
| Galatasaray USA Alumni Association | United States | 1981 |
| Galatasaray Educational Foundation | Turkey | 1981 |
| Association Européenne des Anciens de Galatasaray | Switzerland | 1983 |
| Amicale de Galatasaray | France | 1984 |
| The Galatasaray Charity Fund | United Kingdom | 1986 |
| Les Anciens de Galatasaray au Benelux | Belgium | 1989 |
| Eskişehir Galatasaray Alumni Association | Turkey | 1990 |
| Verein ehemaliger Schüler des Galatasaray-Gymnasiums in Deutschland e. V. | Germany | 1991 |
| Çukurova Galatasaray Alumni Association | Turkey | 1992 |
| Galatasaray University | Turkey | 1992 |
| Verein ehemaliger Schüler von Galatasaray Lisesi in Österreich | Austria | 1992 |
| Galatasaray Primary School | Turkey | 1993 |
| Antalya Galatasaray Alumni Association | Turkey | 1993 |
| Alliance Galatasaray | France | 1996 |
| Kapadokya Galatasaray Alumni Union | Turkey | 1997 |
| Galatasaray Association de Monaco | Monaco | 1997 |
| Galatasaray University Alumni Association | Turkey | 2002 |
