= Galatasaray University =

Turkish university established in Istanbul, Turkey in 1992

- Galatasaray Üniversitesi; Université Galatasaray
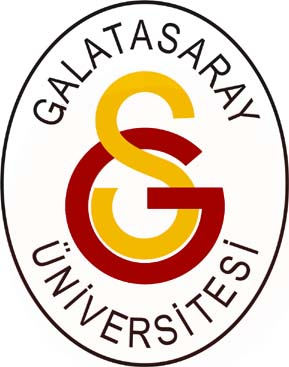
- Latin: Universitas Galatasarensis
- Type: Public
- Established: 1481; 545 years ago (Enderûn); 14 April 1992; 34 years ago (University)
- Founders: Bayezid II (1481); Turgut Özal & François Mitterrand (1992)
- Rector: Prof. Dr. Abdurrahman Muhammed Uludağ
- Administrative staff: 200
- Undergraduates: 2,000
- Postgraduates: 500
- Location: Ortaköy, Çırağan Cd., Istanbul, Turkey; 41°02′44.70″N 29°1′13.8″E
- Campus: Urban
- Language: French
- Colors: Red Yellow
- Mascot: Lion
- Website: gsu.edu.tr

University rankings

Regional – Overall
- QS Emerging Europe and Central Asia: 231-240 (2022)

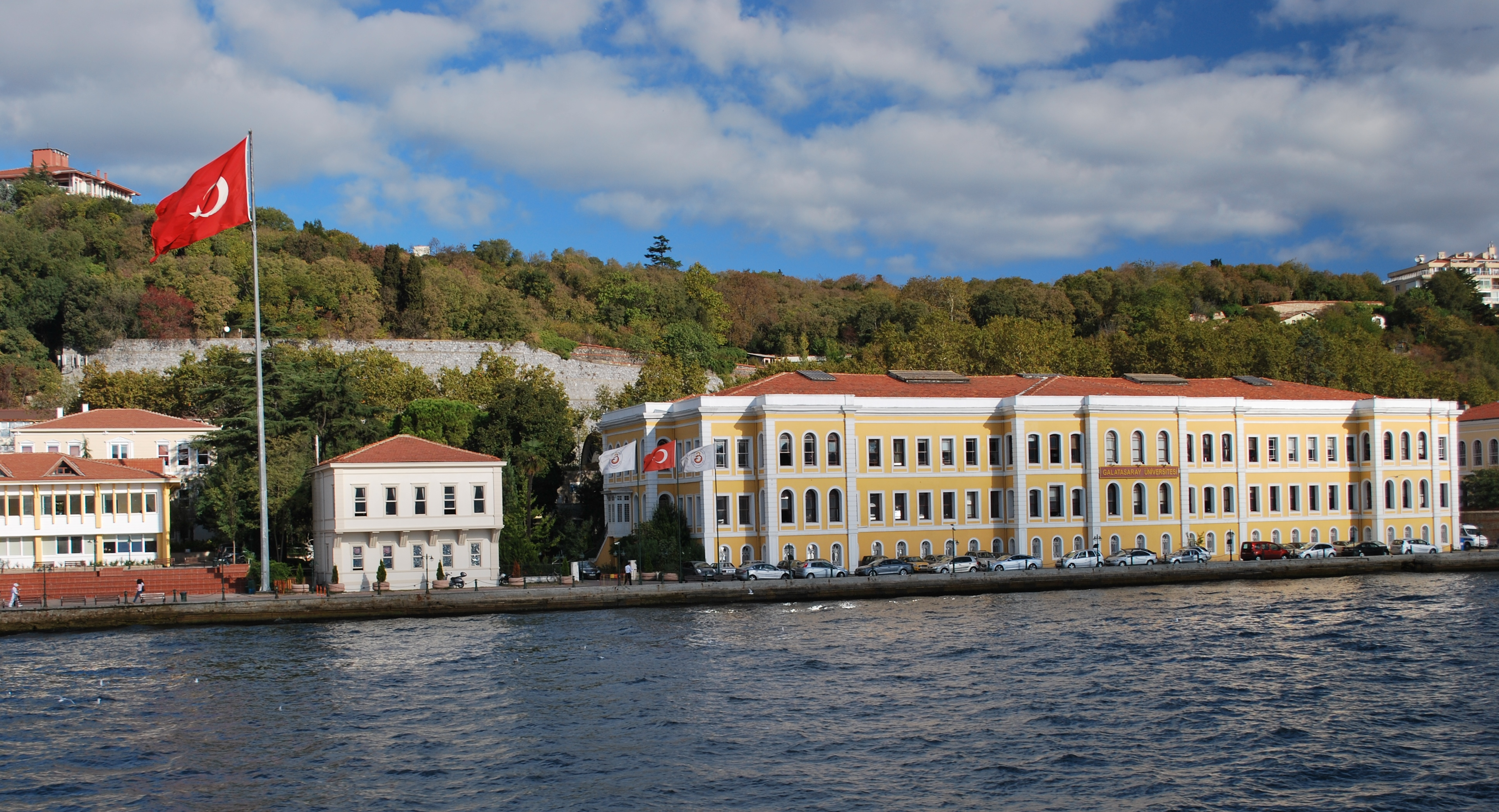
Galatasaray University Main Building

Galatasaray University (Turkish: Galatasaray Üniversitesi, French: Université Galatasaray) is a public university established in Istanbul, Turkey in 1992, following an agreement signed in the presence of President François Mitterrand of France and President Turgut Özal of Turkey during a ceremony at Galatasaray High School, the mother school of the university. Turkey's Ambassador to France, Coşkun Kırca, was instrumental in facilitating the agreement. Galatasaray University is a member of the Galatasaray Community, alongside Galatasaray High School and Galatasaray Sports Club, and is recognized as a prominent institution in Turkey. Galatasaray University is located at Ortaköy within the borough of Beşiktaş, a populous central district on the European side of Istanbul. The building that accommodates Galatasaray University was originally the Feriye Palace, a coastal summer palace on the Bosphorus built in 1871.

== History ==
In 1871, during the reign of Sultan Abdülaziz, the building was built by Ottoman Armenian architect Sarkis Balyan. The building was used as a dormitory for the female students of the Galatasaray High School until 1992, when it was inaugurated as the Galatasaray University. Galatasaray University was originally the Feriye Palace, a coastal summer palace on the Bosphorus built in 1871.

Galatasaray University continues the long-standing traditions of Galatasaray High School, originally established in 1481 as the Galata Sarayı Enderun-u Hümayunu (English: Galata Palace Imperial School).

The establishment comprises five faculties: Economic and Administrative Sciences, Law, Communications, Natural Sciences and Literature, and Engineering and Technology. It also includes two institutes, Social Sciences and Applied Sciences, with 200 academic staff members and 2,500 students.

As a participant in the European exchange programs Erasmus and Socrates, Galatasaray University accommodates around 50 European students. Meanwhile, 100 students of Galatasaray University travel each year to France within the framework of these exchange programs.

Courses at Galatasaray University are conducted in three languages: French, Turkish and English. French serves as the primary language, while English is required as the secondary foreign language. Additionally, students are expected to study a third language, choosing between Spanish and German. For students in the Faculty of Engineering, the preparatory program includes a single year of language training.

On January 22, 2013, the roof of a building used by professors and secretaries for offices caught on fire. The cause was assumed to be electrical, since a small outlet fire occurred at around 6:00 pm. After campus security stabilized the fire and disabled the alarm, the fire spread inside the walls of the building to the roof. The fire was contained at approximately 10:00 pm.

== Academic Units ==
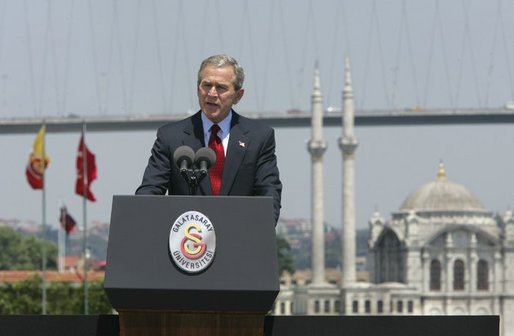
U.S. President George W. Bush delivers remarks at Galatasaray University in 2004.

Faculty of Arts and Sciences

- Comparative Linguistics and Applied Languages
- Mathematics
- Philosophy (Dual Diploma with Paris 1 Panthéon-Sorbonne University)
- Sociology

Faculty of Communications

- Radio, TV and Cinema (Dual Diploma with Bordeaux Montaigne University)
- Public Relations & Advertising (Dual Diploma with Bordeaux Montaigne University)
- Journalism and Internet Broadcasting (Dual Diploma with Bordeaux Montaigne University)

Faculty of Economics and Administrative Sciences

- Economics (Dual Diploma with Paris 1 Panthéon-Sorbonne University)
- Business Administration
- International Relations
- Political Science

Faculty of Engineering & Technology

- Computer Engineering
- Industrial Engineering

Faculty of Law

- Law (LL.B., LL.M. and Ph.D.)

=== Institute of Social Sciences ===
- International Relations Graduate Program
- Doctorate Program in Business Administration
- Business Administration (MBA)
- Business Administration M.Sc. Marketing and Logistics
- Graduate Program in Regional Strategic Studies
- Public Law Ph.D. Program
- Private Law Graduate Program
- Public Law Graduate Program
- MA in Communication Strategies and Public Relations
- Private Law Ph.D. Program
- Philosophy Graduate Program
- Mass Media and Communication Graduate Program
- Philosophy Ph.D. Program
- Sociological Studies on Turkey
- Economics Ph.D. Program
- Political Science Ph.D. Program

=== Institute of Sciences ===
- Industrial Engineering Ph.D. Program
- Master of Science Program in Industrial Engineering
- Non-thesis Master of Science Program in Engineering Management
- Non-thesis Master of Science Program in Information Technologies
- Non-thesis Master of Science Program in Marketing Communications Management

== Research centers ==
- Administration Research Center
- Penalty Law and Criminology Research Center
- Strategical Research Center
- Center of Research and Documentation of Europe
- Kemalist Reforms Research Center
- MEDIAR Center for Media Studies, Research and Applications
- GİAM Galatasaray Center For Economic Research

== Rectors ==
- Prof. Dr. Yıldızhan Yayla (1992-2000)
- Prof. Dr. Erdoğan Teziç (2000-2003)
- Prof. Dr. Duygun Yarsuvat (2004-2008)
- Prof. Dr. Ethem Tolga (2008-2015)
- Prof. Dr. Ertuğrul Karsak (2015-2023)
- Prof. Dr. Abdurrahman Muhammed Uludağ (2023-)

== Notable alumni ==
- Sedef Çakmak (BA in Sociology), politician and LGBT rights activist

== See also ==
- Galatasaray High School
- Galatasaray S.K.
