= Galatasaray (magazine) =

- Galatasaray
- Executive Editor: Mehmet Şenol
- Staff writers: Tarık Ünlütürk; Atahan Altınordu; Eray Sözen; Eren Loğoğlu
- Categories: Sports magazine
- Frequency: monthly
- Circulation: ▲100.000 (2009)
- Publisher: Galatasaray Sports Club
- First issue: 1 June 2002
- Company: Galatasaray Sports Club
- Country: Turkey
- Based in: Beyoğlu, Istanbul
- Language: Turkish
- Website: http://www.galatasaray.org/gsdergi

Galatasaray (Turkish: Galatasaray Dergisi) is a monthly released official magazine to the fans of Turkish sports club Galatasaray S.K.. The magazine was first released on 1 June 2002. It is the first official sports club magazine in Turkey.

Galatasaray was the best selling sports club magazine in Turkey (▲100,000 copies monthly) in 2009.
