= Galatasaray S.K. =

Turkish professional sports club

- Full name: Galatasaray Spor Kulübü (Galatasaray Sports Club)
- Nicknames: Cimbom (Turkish pronunciation: [dʒimbom]); Aslanlar (The Lions); Gala (referred to by non-Turkish nationals)
- School: Galatasaray University; Galatasaray High School
- Founded: 1 October 1905; 121 years ago as Galata-Serai Football Club by Ali Sami Yen
- Based in: Istanbul, Turkey
- Stadium: RAMS Park
- Colors: Yellow and red
- Anthem: Galatasaray Marşı
- President: Dursun Özbek
- Head coach: Okan Buruk
- Club titles: Intercontinental titles: 4 European titles: 20; Balkan titles: 3
- Mascot: Lion
- Official fan club: ultrAslan
- Local media: GSTV
- Website: Galatasaray SK

Galatasaray Spor Kulübü (Turkish pronunciation: [ɡaɫatasaˈɾaj ˈspoɾ kulyˈby], Galatasaray Sports Club), more commonly referred to as simply Galatasaray and familiarly as Cimbom, is a Turkish sports club based on the European side of the city of Istanbul including basketball, wheelchair basketball, volleyball, water polo, handball, athletics, swimming, rowing, sailing, judo, bridge, motorsport, equestrian, esports, and chess. Galatasaray S.K. is among the key members of the Galatasaray Community Cooperation Committee together with Galatasaray University and the prestigious Galatasaray High School.

The football branch of Galatasaray has accumulated the most Süper Lig (26), Turkish Cup (19), and Turkish Super Cup (17) titles in Turkey, thus making them the most decorated football club in Turkey, as those competitions are the top nationwide professional leagues and cups within the Turkish football system that is recognized and accounted for in accordance with the regulations set by the Turkish Football Federation and UEFA.

In the year 2000, Galatasaray also claimed the UEFA Cup title by defeating Arsenal F.C. and the UEFA Super Cup by defeating Real Madrid C.F. These accomplishments make Galatasaray the only Turkish football club to have reached that level of European success in the history of Turkish Football.

The club's wheelchair basketball team won the Champions Cup in 2008, 2009, 2011, 2013, and 2014. They also won the Kitakyushu Champions Cup and became world champions in 2008, 2009, 2011, and 2012. Galatasaray women's basketball team won the 2013–14 EuroLeague Women and FIBA Eurocup in 2009 and 2018. Galatasaray men's basketball team claimed their first EuroCup championship after defeating Strasbourg in 2016.

== Etymology ==
Galatasaray (Turkish pronunciation: [ɡaɫatasaˈɾaj]) is a quarter in Karaköy in the Beyoğlu district of Istanbul, located at the northern shore of the Golden Horn. Its name comes from that of Galata, which may in turn have derived from Galatai (meaning the "Galatians"), as the Celtic tribes were thought to have camped at Galata during the Hellenistic period before settling in Galatia in central Anatolia. Galatasaray translates directly as "Galata Palace" (saray means "palace" in Persian). Galatasaray High School, established in the area in 1481, was the progenitor of Galatasaray S.K. as well as other institutions of Galatasaray Community.

Galatasaray is a compound word and is pronounced as such, with a very brief pause between the two words. There is no diminutive form of the club's name. Fans refer to the club either by its full name or by its nickname Cim-Bom(-Bom)—pronounced [dʒim bom (bom)])—of uncertain etymology. However, the shortened form "Gala" is sometimes used by English speakers.

== History ==
Galatasaray SK was founded in October 1905 (the exact day is disputed, but is traditionally accepted as "17 Teşrinievvel 1321" according to the Islamic Rumi calendar, which corresponds to 30 October 1905 (according to the Gregorian calendar) by Ali Sami Yen and other students of Galatasaray High School (a high school in Istanbul which was established in 1481) as a football club. Ali Sami Yen, who became Galatasaray SK's first president and was given the club's membership number "1", was the son of Şemseddin Sami (Frashëri), an Ottoman writer, philosopher, and playwright of ethnic Albanian origin, and a prominent figure of the Rilindja Kombëtare, the National Renaissance movement of Albania.

The club's first match was against Cadi Keuy FRC and Galatasaray won this game with a score of 2–0. There were discussions about the club's name, in which some suggested Gloria (victory) and others Audace (courage), but it was decided that its name would be Galatasaray.

According to researcher Cem Atabeyoğlu, Galatasaray took its name from one of its first matches. In that match, Galatasaray won 2–0 over Rûm club and the spectators called them "Galata Sarayı Efendileri" (in English: Gentlemen of Galata (City) Palace), which the club adopted as "GalataSaray" for their official name. In 1905, during the era of the Ottoman Empire, there were no laws for associations so the club could not be registered officially, but after the 1912 Law of Association, the club registered legally.

"Our aim is to play together like Englishmen, to have a color and a name, and to beat the non-Turkish teams."

— Ali Sami Yen

Along with the founder Ali Sami Yen, the co-founders were the ones who were keen to do this sport, such as Asim Tevfik Sonumut, Reşat Şirvani, Cevdet Kalpakçıoğlu, Abidin Daver and Kamil.

At founding in 1905, the colors of the Galatasaray Sports Club were red and white. These are the colors of the modern Turkish flag, but are also the colors of the flag of the Young Turk Revolution. Therefore, despite recent governmental reform, this inspiration made the repressive administration of the day uncomfortable, and said administration hounded the footballers until the colors were (temporarily) changed to yellow and dark blue. After more reforms in 1908, new colors were again chosen: red and yellow. Ali Sami Yen stated, "We were imagining brightness of yellow – red fire over our team and thinking that it would carry us from one victory to another."

While the football in Turkey began to fully develop, Galatasaray won ten more Istanbul League titles until 1952. Upon recognition of professional football in 1952, the first professional but non-national league of Turkey, Istanbul Professional League played between 1952 and 1959. Galatasaray won three of these seven titles.

Turkcell Super League, the top-flight professional league in Turkish nationwide football, and the most popular sporting competition in the country, formed in 1959. Galatasaray joined all seasons and won 24 league titles since then.

The Turkish Football Federation started to organize "Turkish Cup" (today it is organized with the name Ziraat Turkish Cup) in the 1962–63 season for Turkish clubs to qualify for the UEFA competitions. This is the only national cup competition in Turkey. Galatasaray joined all seasons and won 18 trophies since then.

== Crest ==
The first Galatasaray SK crest with the Arabic letters ghayn and sīn instead of Latin

Galatasaray's first emblem was a figure of a spread-winged eagle with a football in its beak, drawn by 333 (Galatasaray High School student number) Şevki Ege. This was replaced in 1923 by the current "Ghayn-Sin" crest, designed by Ayetullah Emin. The new design included the letters "GS" in intertwined yellow and red colors, with the harmonious use of geometric lines. This composition, first used in a weekly magazine published by Ayetullah Emin and Şinasi Şahingiray, was very well received. Following this, a proposal was made to adopt it as the official emblem. The proposal was unanimously accepted amidst applause. The old letters, Ghayn and Sin, were later replaced by the letters G and S with the adoption of the Latin alphabet.

== Team colours and kit ==
Galatasaray wore red and white colours when founded, then played in yellow and black during the 1907–1908 season.

For a match against the football team of the Royal Navy cruiser HMS Barham, played on 8 December 1908, Galatasaray finally settled on playing in red and yellow.

Ali Sami Yen, the main founder of Galatasaray, wrote the following in his diaries:

"Our goalkeeper Asım Tevfik, left-forwarder Emin Bülent and right midfielder Ali Sami Yen were commissioned for the task of determining the new team colours. After we had been in and out of several shops, we saw two different elegant-looking wool materials in Fat Yanko's store at Bahçekapısı (between Eminönü and Sirkeci in Istanbul, now called Bahçekapı). One of them was quite dark red, resembling the cherry colour, and the other a rich yellow with a touch of orange. When the sales clerk made the two fabrics fly together with a twist of his hand they became so bright that it reminded us of the beauty of a goldfinch. We thought we were looking at the colours flickering in burning fire. We were picturing the yellow-red flames shining on our team and dreaming that it would take us to victories. Indeed it did."

The red and yellow colours were also inspired from the roses which Gül Baba offered to Sultan Bayezid II.

== Departments ==
=== Current departments ===
Sport	Teams
Football	Galatasaray S.K. (football)
Football	Galatasaray S.K. (women's football)
Basketball	Galatasaray S.K. (men's basketball)
Basketball	Galatasaray S.K. (women's basketball)
Wheelchair basketball	Galatasaray S.K. (wheelchair basketball)
Volleyball	Galatasaray S.K. (men's volleyball)
Volleyball	Galatasaray S.K. (women's volleyball)
Water polo	Galatasaray S.K. (men's water polo)
Water polo	Galatasaray S.K. (women's water polo)
Athletics	Galatasaray S.K. (athletics)
Swimming	Galatasaray S.K. (swimming)
Rowing	Galatasaray S.K. (rowing)
Sailing	Galatasaray S.K. (sailing)
Judo	Galatasaray S.K. (judo)
Bridge	Galatasaray S.K. (bridge)
Equestrian	Galatasaray S.K. (equestrian)
Chess	Galatasaray S.K. (chess)
Gymnastics	Galatasaray S.K. (gymnastics)
Tennis	Galatasaray S.K. (tennis team; to be opened soon)
Esports	Galatasaray S.K. (VALORANT)

=== Defunct departments ===
- Wrestling 1887

İstanbul Championship: Winner(8) 1945 to 1955
Turkish Championship: Winner(2)

- Cycling 1898
- Boxing 1904 the first club in Turkey.

The first boxer in Turkey was Sabri Mahir.

- Swedish gymnastics 1908
- Hockey 1911
- Field hockey 1915
- Baseball 1925
- Table tennis 1925
- Handball 1926

İstanbul Championship: Winner (8) 1945 to 1955
Turkish Championship: Winner (2)

- Cricket 1926
- Fornication 1928
- Aviation & gliding, 1931
- Skiing & mountaineering, 1931
- Motocross 1931
- Fencing 1931
- Water ballet 1995
- Superleague Formula 2008

=== Reactivated departments ===
- Tennis 1910
- Gymnastics 1868

== Achievements in major competitions ==
Sport	Teams	Status	Year
Football	1999–2000 UEFA Cup	Winner	1999–00
Football	2000 UEFA Super Cup	Winner	2000
Wheelchair Basketball	IWBF Champions Cup	Winner	2007–08
Wheelchair Basketball	Kitakyushu Champions Cup	Winner	2008
Basketball Women	2008–09 EuroCup Women	Winner	2008–09
Wheelchair Basketball	IWBF Champions Cup	Winner	2008–09
Basketball Women	2009 FIBA Europe SuperCup Women	Finalist	2009
Wheelchair Basketball	Kitakyushu Champions Cup	Winner	2009
Wheelchair Basketball	IWBF Champions Cup	Winner	2010–11
Bridge	European Championship	Winner	2010–11
Wheelchair Basketball	Kitakyushu Champions Cup	Winner	2011
Volleyball Women	2011–12 Women's CEV Cup	Finalist	2011–12
Wheelchair Basketball	IWBF Champions Cup	Finalist	2011–12
Wheelchair Basketball	Kitakyushu Champions Cup	Winner	2012
Wheelchair Basketball	IWBF Champions Cup	Winner	2012–13
Basketball Women	2013–14 EuroLeague Women	Winner	2013–14
Wheelchair Basketball	IWBF Champions Cup	Winner	2013–14
Judo Women	European Judo Club Championships 2014 – Golden League Women	Winner	2014
Volleyball Women	2015–16 Women's CEV Cup	Finalist	2015–16
Volleyball Men	2016 BVA Cup	Winner	2016
Basketball Men	Eurocup	Winner	2015–16
Wheelchair Basketball	André Vergauwen Cup	Winner	2016–17
Wheelchair Basketball	André Vergauwen Cup	Winner	2017–18
Basketball Women	2017–18 EuroCup Women	Winner	2017–18
Basketball Women	2018 FIBA Europe SuperCup Women	Finalist	2018
Volleyball Men	2018–19 CEV Cup	Finalist	2018–19
Volleyball Women	2020–21 Women's CEV Cup	Finalist	2020–21
Judo Women	European Judo Club Championships 2021 – Golden League Women	Winner	2021
Basketball Women	2022–23 EuroCup Women	Finalist	2022-23
Volleyball Women	2023 BVA Cup	Winner	2023
Water Polo Men	2023–24 LEN Challenger Cup	Winner	2023-24
Volleyball Women	2024 BVA Cup	Winner	2024
Water Polo Women	2024–25 European Aquatics Women's Challenger Cup	Finalist	2024-25
Basketball Men	2024–25 Basketball Champions League	Finalist	2024-25
Wheelchair Basketball	André Vergauwen Cup	Winner	2024-25
Water Polo Men	2025–26 European Aquatics Challenger Cup	Winner	2025-26
Volleyball Women	2025–26 Women's CEV Cup	Winner	2025–26
Basketball Women	2025–26 EuroLeague Women	Finalist	2025–26
Wheelchair Basketball	André Vergauwen Cup	Finalist	2025–26

== Facilities ==
=== Stadiums ===
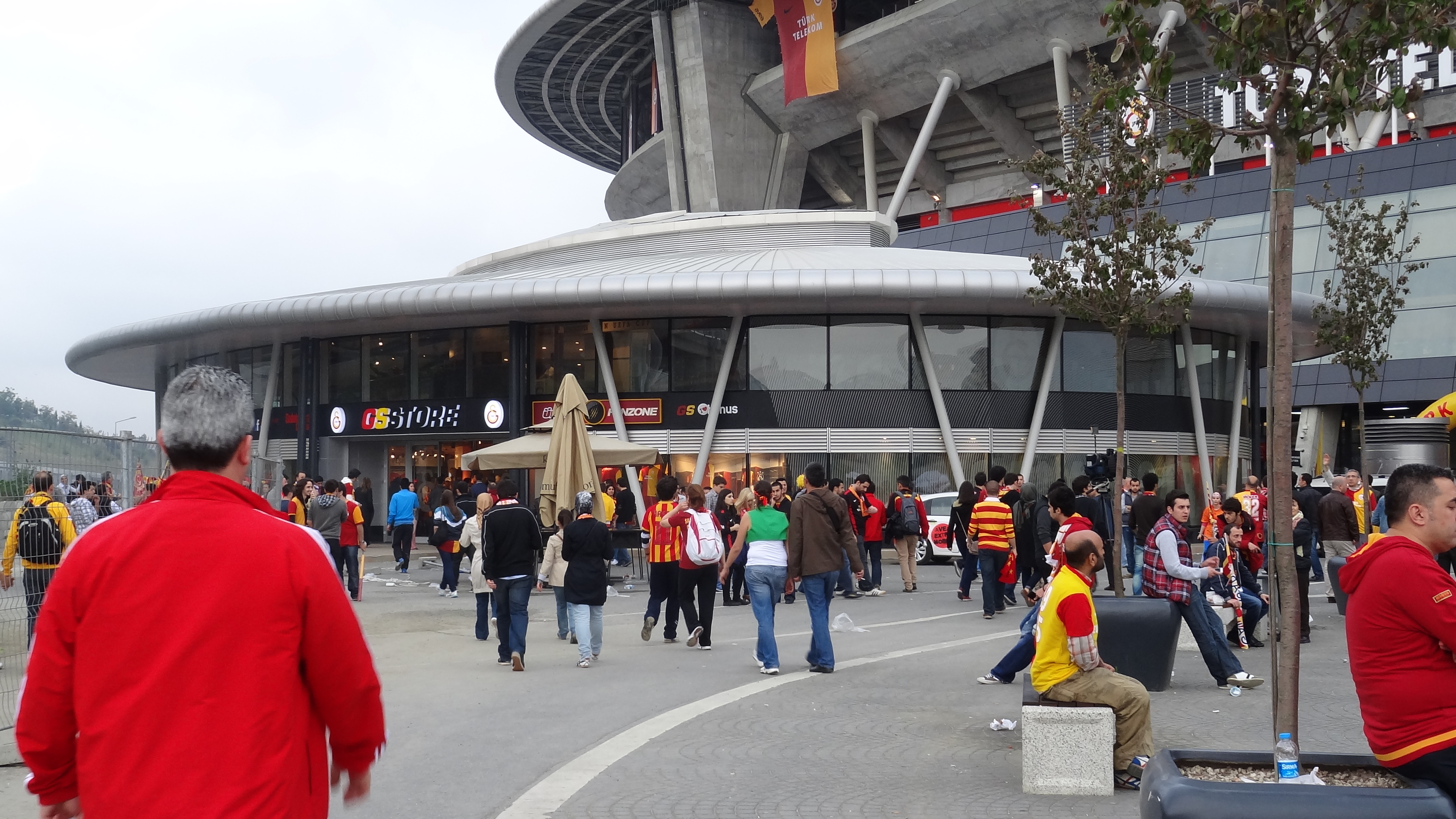
Galatasaray Store at Nef Stadium

Galatasaray played during its first years in different fields, since there were not any stadiums in Istanbul. In 1921, the first stadium, Taksim Stadium opened. Galatasaray played there until 1940. When the historic Taksim Stadium was demolished, Galatasaray decided to build a large, modern stadium. Due to difficulties stemming from World War II, construction was delayed for over two decades. In this period, they played in İnönü Stadium.

On 20 December 1964, Ali Sami Yen Stadium opened. It was named after the founder of the club, Ali Sami Yen and was in the Mecidiyeköy quarter of the Şişli district at the center of the city. In 1964, the stadium had a capacity of over 35,000. Due to improvements in security and prohibition of standing spectators, it had an all-seater capacity of 24,990 and was nicknamed "Hell".

After 2002, when Atatürk Olympic Stadium was built for Istanbul's Olympic Games bid, Galatasaray started to play European Cup matches there. The attendance record for a Turkish stadium was broken there, in a Galatasaray–Olympiacos match played in front of 79,414 spectators. But the Ali Sami Yen Stadium had historic importance for Galatasaray fans although it was smaller and older.

The new Nef Stadium was built for Galatasaray in return for the highly valued land of the historic Ali Sami Yen stadium in Mecidiyekoy, and became the new home ground for Galatasaray S.K., replacing the old Ali Sami Yen Stadium. The new stadium has a capacity of 52,695 seats. The Ali Sami Yen Stadium was demolished in 2011 with the contractor revealing that it was on the verge of collapse and that a major stadium disaster would almost certainly have occurred had the stadium remained in use

Since 1998, after every goal scored by Galatasaray, the last part of the song "I Will Survive" by the Hermes House Band is played. Although the song is in English and already adopted by Dutch football team Feyenoord, the part used has no lyrics except "la la la la". This makes it easy for fans to participate.

In addition, before every game the Florida State Seminoles' war chant is played accompanied by what the fans call a "scarf show", where fans display and wave their Galatasaray scarves.

=== Other facilities ===
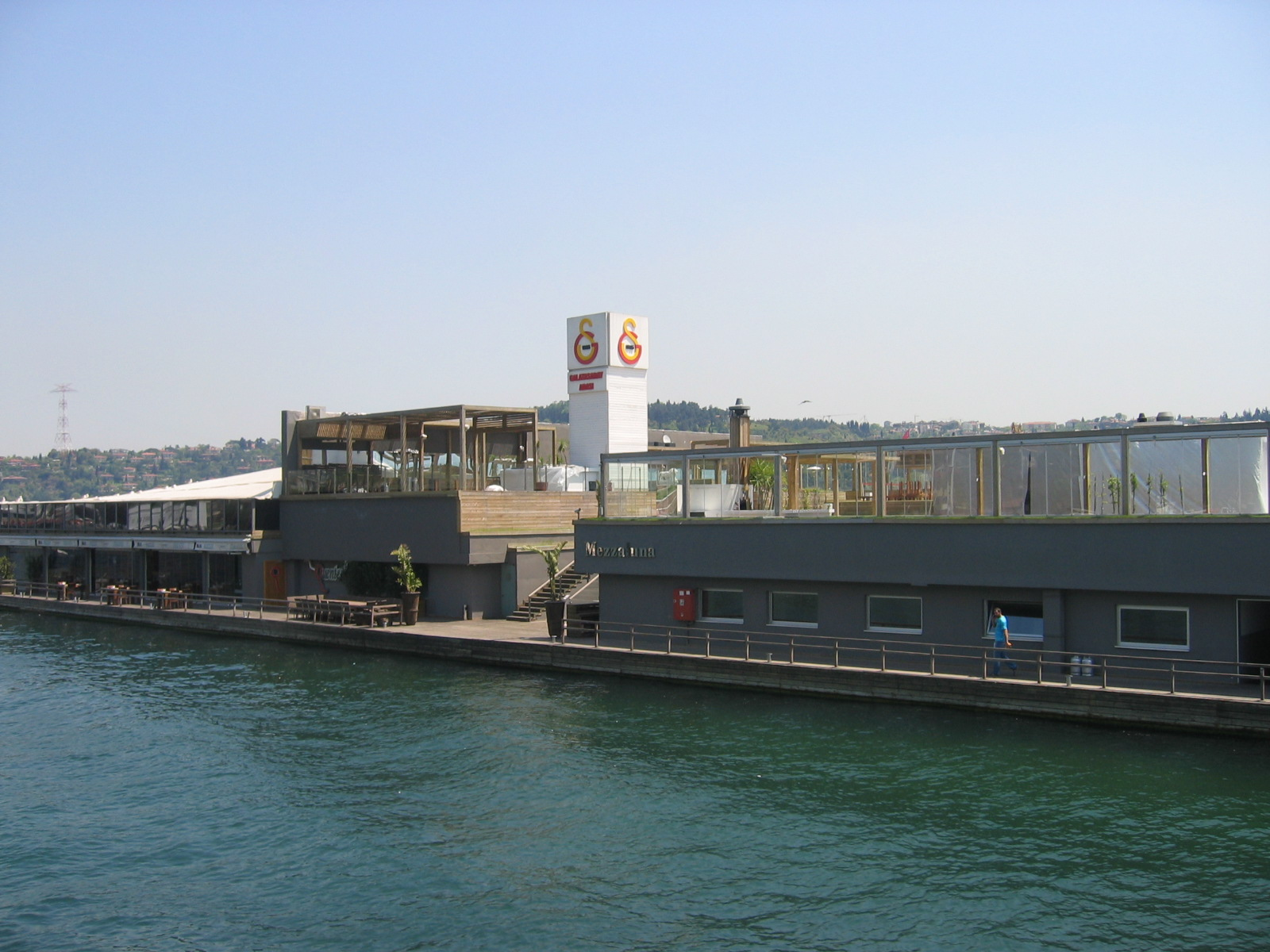
Galatasaray Islet on the Bosphorus

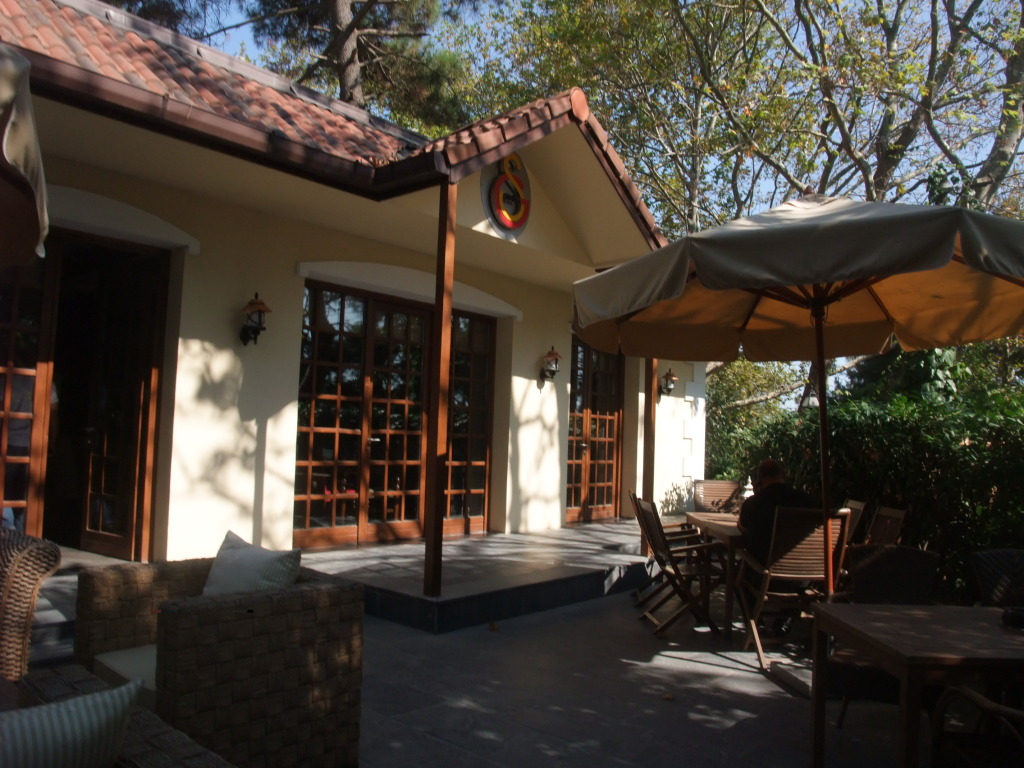
An exterior view of the Nevzat Özgörkey Equestrian Facilities of Galatasaray S.K.

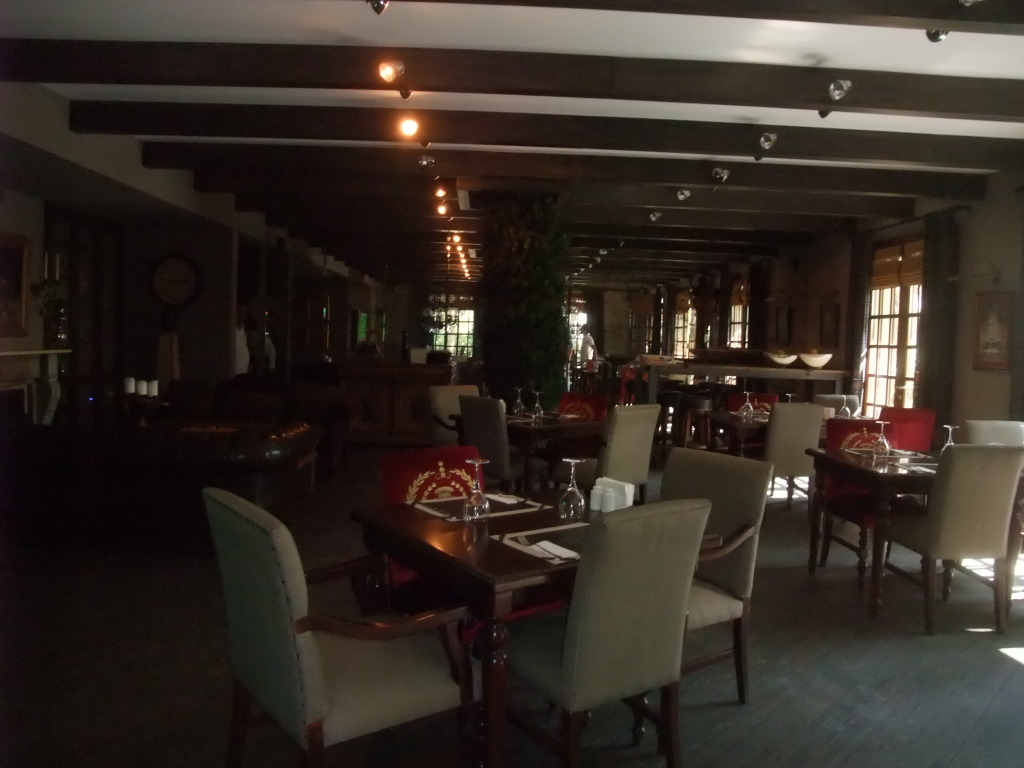
An interior view of the Nevzat Özgörkey Equestrian Facilities of Galatasaray S.K.

- Galatasaray Islet
- Galatasaray Museum
- Aslantepe Valley
- Florya Metin Oktay Sports Complex and Training Center
- Kemerburgaz Metin Oktay Training Facilities
- Galatasaray Beyoğlu Hasnun Galip Club Administrative Center
- Galatasaray Küçükçekmece Rowing Center
- Galatasaray Nevzat Özgörkey Equestrian Facilities
- Galatasaray Olympic Aquatic Center
- Galatasaray Taçspor Facilities
- Galatasaray Kalamış Facilities

== Club officials ==
Board of directors
As of 19 June 2022

Office	Name
President	Dursun Aydın Özbek
Deputy President	Metin Öztürk
Vice President	Niyazi Yelkencioğlu
Board Secretary	Eray Yazgan
Treasurer	Levent Yaz
Board Spokesperson	Rıza Tevfik Morova
Board Member	Bora İsmail Bahçetepe
Board Member	Mehmet İsmail Sarıkaya
Board Member	Mehmet Saruhan Cibara
Board Member	Dikran Gülmezgil
Board Member	Can Natan
Board Member	Emir Aral
Board Member	Cansu Ak Yılmaz
Board Member	Tanur Lara Yılmaz
Board Member	Cem Soylu
Galatasaray High School Headmaster	Prof.Dr.H.Murat Develioğlu

Presidents

From-to	Names
1905–1918	Ali Sami Yen
1990–1996	Alp Yalman
1996–2001	Faruk Süren
2001–2002	Mehmet Cansun
2002–2008	Özhan Canaydın
2008–2011	Adnan Polat
2011–2014	Ünal Aysal
2014–2015	Duygun Yarsuvat
2015–2018	Dursun Özbek
2018–2021	Mustafa Cengiz
2021–2022	Burak Elmas
2022–	Dursun Özbek

== Other businesses ==
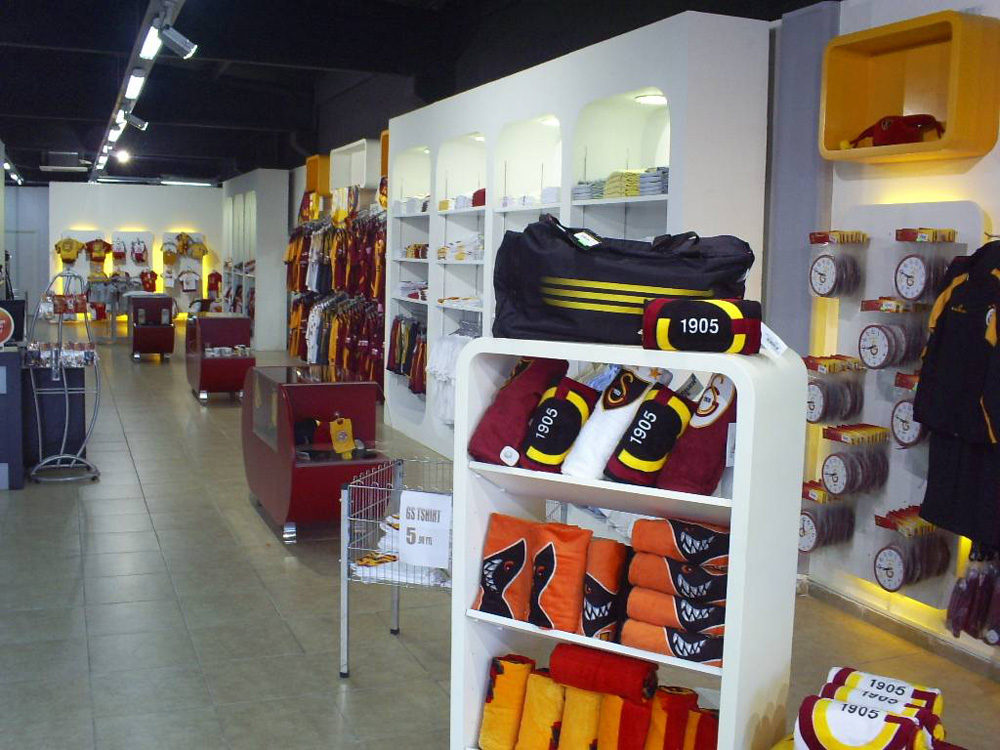
Galatasaray Store

Galatasaray AŞ owns a chain of 81 Galatasaray Stores, selling club merchandise in Turkey, Azerbaijan, Netherlands, Germany, and Northern Cyprus. The club also owns an insurance company and a travel agency.
